= 2004 Chicago White Sox season =

2004 Chicago White Sox
- League: American League
- Division: Central
- Ballpark: U.S. Cellular Field
- City: Chicago
- Record: 83–79 (.512)
- Divisional place: 2nd
- Owners: Jerry Reinsdorf
- General managers: Kenny Williams
- Managers: Ozzie Guillén
- Television: WGN-TV/WCIU-TV; FSN Chicago (Ken Harrelson, Darrin Jackson)
- Radio: WMVP (John Rooney, Ed Farmer)

The 2004 Chicago White Sox season was the White Sox's 105th season, and their 104th season in Major League Baseball. They finished with a record of 83–79, finishing second place in the American League Central, 9 games behind the champion Minnesota Twins.

== Offseason ==
- November 3, 2003: Named Ozzie Guillén manager.
- November 26, 2003: Sandy Alomar Jr. was signed as a free agent with the Chicago White Sox.
- December 2, 2003: Acquired shortstop Juan Uribe from the Colorado Rockies in exchange for Aaron Miles.
- January 7, 2004: Agreed to terms with relief pitcher Cliff Politte on a one-year contract with a club option for 2005.
- January 22, 2004: Signed relief pitcher Shingo Takatsu to a one-year contract, with a club option for 2005.

== Regular season ==
=== Season standings ===
AL Central
Team	W	L	Pct.	GB	Home	Road
Minnesota Twins	92	70	.568	—	49‍–‍32	43‍–‍38
Chicago White Sox	83	79	.512	9	46‍–‍35	37‍–‍44
Cleveland Indians	80	82	.494	12	44‍–‍37	36‍–‍45
Detroit Tigers	72	90	.444	20	38‍–‍43	34‍–‍47
Kansas City Royals	58	104	.358	34	33‍–‍47	25‍–‍57

=== Record vs. opponents ===
2004 American League record Source: MLB Standings Grid – 2004
Team	ANA	BAL	BOS	CWS	CLE	DET	KC	MIN	NYY	OAK	SEA	TB	TEX	TOR	NL
Anaheim	—	6–3	4–5	5–4	4–5	7–2	7–0	5–4	5–4	10–9	13–7	6–1	9–10	4–5	7–11
Baltimore	3–6	—	10–9	2–4	3–3	6–0	6–3	4–5	5–14	0–7	7–2	11–8	5–2	11–8	5–13
Boston	5–4	9–10	—	4–2	3–4	6–1	4–2	2–4	11–8	8–1	5–4	14–5	4–5	14–5	9–9
Chicago	4–5	4–2	2–4	—	10–9	8–11	13–6	9–10	3–4	2–7	7–2	4–2	6–3	3–4	8–10
Cleveland	5–4	3–3	4–3	9–10	—	9–10	11–8	7–12	2–4	6–3	5–4	3–3	1–8	5–2	10–8
Detroit	2–7	0–6	1–6	11–8	10–9	—	8–11	7–12	4–3	4–5	5–4	3–3	4–5	4–2	9–9
Kansas City	0–7	3–6	2–4	6–13	8–11	11–8	—	7–12	1–5	2–7	2–5	3–6	4–5	3–3	6–12
Minnesota	4–5	5–4	4–2	10–9	12–7	12–7	12–7	—	2–4	2–5	5–4	4–5	5–2	4–2	11–7
New York	4–5	14–5	8–11	4–3	4–2	3–4	5–1	4–2	—	7–2	6–3	15–4	5–4	12–7	10–8
Oakland	9–10	7–0	1–8	7–2	3–6	5–4	7–2	5–2	2–7	—	11–8	7–2	11–9	6–3	10–8
Seattle	7–13	2–7	4–5	2–7	4–5	4–5	5–2	4–5	3–6	8–11	—	2–5	7–12	2–7	9–9
Tampa Bay	1–6	8–11	5–14	2–4	3–3	3–3	6–3	5–4	4–15	2–7	5–2	—	2–7	9–9	15–3
Texas	10–9	2–5	5–4	3–6	8–1	5–4	5–4	2–5	4–5	9–11	12–7	7–2	—	7–2	10–8
Toronto	5–4	8–11	5–14	4–3	2–5	2–4	3–3	2–4	7–12	3–6	7–2	9–9	2–7	—	8–10

=== Opening Day starters ===
Starters
Position	Player
P	Mark Buehrle
C	Sandy Alomar Jr.
1B	Paul Konerko
2B	Willie Harris
3B	Joe Crede
SS	José Valentín
LF	Carlos Lee
CF	Aaron Rowand
RF	Magglio Ordóñez
DH	Frank Thomas

=== Notable transactions ===
- 6/17/04: Billy Koch was traded by the Chicago White Sox to the Florida Marlins for Wilson Valdez and cash.
- 6/27/04: Traded catcher Miguel Olivo, minor league outfielder Jeremy Reed and minor league infielder Mike Morse to the Seattle Mariners for starting pitcher Freddy García and Catcher Ben Davis.
- 7/31/04: Traded starting pitcher Esteban Loaiza to the New York Yankees for starting pitcher José Contreras.

=== Roster ===
2004 Chicago White Sox
Roster
Pitchers: 37 Jon Adkins; 57 Jeff Bajenaru; 56 Mark Buehrle; 52 José Contreras; 46 Neal Cotts; 57 Vic Darensbourg; 54 Félix Díaz; 34 Freddy García; 20 Jon Garland; 41 Jason Grilli; 38 Mike Jackson; 44 Billy Koch; 21 Esteban Loaiza; 43 Dámaso Marte; 49 Arnie Muñoz; 18 Cliff Politte; 51 Jon Rauch; 60 Scott Schoeneweis; 48 Josh Stewart; 10 Shingo Takatsu; 36 Dan Wright; 65 Kelly Wunsch	Catchers: 15 Sandy Alomar Jr.; 27 Jamie Burke; 12,31 Ben Davis; 8 Miguel Olivo; Infielders: 12 Roberto Alomar; 24 Joe Crede; 32 Kelly Dransfeldt; 26 Ross Gload; 1 Willie Harris; 14 Paul Konerko; 35 Frank Thomas; 5 Juan Uribe; 39 Wilson Valdéz; 22 José Valentín	Outfielders: 25 Joe Borchard; 45 Carlos Lee; 30 Magglio Ordóñez; 7 Timo Pérez; 33 Aaron Rowand	Manager: 13 Ozzie Guillén; Coaches: 34 Don Cooper (pitching); 28 Joey Cora (third base); 29 Greg Walker (hitting); 53 Art Kusnyer (bullpen); 17 Rafael Santana (first base)

=== Game log ===
2004 White Sox game log
April (13–8) – home (8–4) – road (5–4)

#	Date	Time	Opponent	Score	Win	Loss	Save	Attendance	Record	Box
1	April 5	@ Royals	7–9	Carrasco (1–0)	Marte (0–1)		2:46	41,575	0–1	box
2	April 7	@ Royals	4–3	Loaiza (1–0)	May (0–1)	Koch (1)	3:05	16,134	1–1	box
3	April 8	@ Yankees	1–3	Vázquez (1–0)	Schoeneweis (0–1)	Rivera (2)	2:28	55,290	1–2	box
4	April 9	@ Yankees	9–3	Garland (1–0)	Contreras (0–1)		2:58	45,965	2–2	box
5	April 10	@ Yankees	7–3	Buehrle (1–0)	DePaula (0–1)		2:34	47,911	3–2	box
6	April 11	@ Yankees	4–5	Mussina (1–2)	Wright (0–1)	Rivera (3)	2:42	37,484	3–3	box
7	April 13	Royals	12–5	Loaiza (2–0)	May (0–2)		2:48	37,706	4–3	box
8	April 14	Royals	10–9	Adkins (1–0)	Leskanic (0–1)		3:27	11,765	5–3	box
9	April 15	Royals	6 – 5 (10)	Marte (1–1)	Carrasco (1–1)		2:36	15,150	6–3	box
10	April 16	@ Devil Rays	0–3	Abbott (1–1)	Wright (0–2)	Báez (1)	2:14	12,108	6–4	box
11	April 17	@ Devil Rays	4–1	Schoeneweis (1–1)	Zambrano (3–1)	Marte (1)	2:39	14,302	7–4	box
12	April 18	@ Devil Rays	5–0	Loaiza (3–0)	González (0–3)		2:12	12,072	8–4	box
13	April 20	Yankees	8–11	Quantrill (2–0)	Buehrle (1–1)	Rivera (4)	3:01	32,034	8–5	box
14	April 21	Yankees	1–3	Vázquez (2–1)	Garland (1–1)	Rivera (5)	2:32	26,154	8–6	box
15	April 22	Yankees	4–3	Schoeneweis (2–1)	Mussina (1–4)	Marte (2)	2:27	34,030	9–6	box
16	April 23	Devil Rays	3 – 2 (10)	Koch (1–0)	Báez (1–1)		3:00	12,049	10–6	box
17	April 24	Devil Rays	1–4	Waechter (1–0)	Wright (0–3)	Báez (2)	2:44	17,062	10–7	box
18	April 25	Devil Rays	6–5	Adkins (2–0)	Miller (0–1)		2:43	17,497	11–7	box
19	April 27	Indians	7 – 11 (10)	Betancourt (2–2)	Adkins (2–1)		3:53	14,572	11–8	box
20	April 28	Indians	9–8	Jackson (1–0)	Betancourt (2–3)		2:55	12,189	12–8	box
21	April 29	Blue Jays	6–4	Loaiza (3–0)	Nakamura (0–1)	Koch (2)	2:47	11,210	13–8	box
–	April 30	Blue Jays	Postponed (rain), rescheduled for May 1							

May (16–12) – home (9–6) – road (7–6)

#	Date	Time	Opponent	Score	Win	Loss	Save	Attendance	Record	Box
22	May 1	Blue Jays	4 – 3 (10)	Takatsu (1–0)	Speier (1–3)		2:45	N/A	14–8	box
23	May 1	Blue Jays	6–10	Lilly (2–2)	Wright (0–4)		3:23	22,072	14–9	box
24	May 2	Blue Jays	3–2	Garland (2–1)	Batista (0–3)	Koch (3)	2:17	15,550	15–9	box
25	May 3	@ Orioles	5–4	Schoeneweis (3–1)	DeJean (0–3)	Koch (4)	3:10	18,849	16–9	box
26	May 4	@ Orioles	3–10	López (2–1)	Loaiza (4–1)		2:52	21,488	16–10	box
27	May 5	@ Orioles	6–5	Takatsu (2–0)	Ryan (1–1)	Koch (5)	3:01	20,978	17–10	box
28	May 7	@ Blue Jays	4–5	Adams (3–1)	Politte (0–1)		2:44	15,661	17–11	box
29	May 8	@ Blue Jays	2–4	Frasor (1–1)	Cotts (0–1)	Adams (1)	2:20	18,368	17–12	box
30	May 9	@ Blue Jays	2–5	Miller (1–0)	Loaiza (4–2)	Ligtenberg (1)	2:11	17,546	17–13	box
31	May 11	Orioles	15–0	Buehrle (2–1)	Ponson (2–3)		2:20	20,400	18–13	box
–	May 12	Orioles	Postponed (rain) Rescheduled for May 13							
32	May 13	Orioles	0–1	Cabrera (1–0)	Garland (2–2)	Julio (6)	2:27	N/A	18–14	box
33	May 13	Orioles	6–5	Jackson (2–0)	Bédard (0–1)	Koch (6)	2:30	18,324	19–14	box
34	May 14	Twins	2–3	Rincón (5–2)	Marte (1–2)	Nathan (11)	3:06	15,962	19–15	box
35	May 15	Twins	1–4	Greisinger (1–2)	Loaiza (4–3)	Nathan (12)	2:12	32,360	19–16	box
36	May 16	Twins	11–0	Buehrle (3–1)	Silva (5–1)		2:34	26,348	20–16	box
37	May 17	@ Indians	2–7	Lee (5–0)	Diaz (0–1)		2:46	15,617	20–17	box
38	May 18	@ Indians	4–2	Garland (3–2)	Durbin (3–4)	Koch (7)	2:18	15,298	21–17	box
39	May 19	@ Indians	15–3	Schoeneweis (4–1)	Davis (1–3)		3:04	17,205	22–17	box
40	May 20	@ Twins	10–3	Loaiza (5–3)	Greisinger (1–3)		2:32	17,640	23–17	box
41	May 21	@ Twins	8–2	Buehrle (4–1)	Silva (5–2)		2:20	30,116	24–17	box
42	May 22	@ Twins	1–9	Radke (4–2)	Cotts (0–2)		2:39	27,413	24–18	box
43	May 23	@ Twins	17–7	Garland (4–2)	Santana (2–2)		3:06	22,859	25–18	box
44	May 25	Rangers	4–7	Rogers (7–2)	Schoeneweis (4–2)	Cordero (15)	3:14	22,359	25–19	box
45	May 26	Rangers	4–0	Loaiza (6–3)	Benoit (2–2)		2:28	18,185	26–19	box
46	May 27	Rangers	9–0	Buehrle (5–1)	Drese (2–2)		2:14	14,428	27–19	box
47	May 28	Angels	4–3	Takatsu (3–0)	Ortiz (1–4)		3:11	21,163	28–19	box
48	May 29	Angels	1–5	Sele (4–0)	Rauch (0–1)		2:51	25,050	28–20	box
49	May 30	Angels	11–2	Schoeneweis (5–2)	Lackey (3–6)		2:30	14,344	29–20	box

June (12–13) – home (7–5) – road (5–8)

#	Date	Time	Opponent	Score	Win	Loss	Save	Attendance	Record	Box
50	June 1	@ Athletics	4 – 6 (12)	Duchscherer (3–1)	Cotts (0–3)		3:06	14,344	29–21	box
51	June 2	@ Athletics	2 – 3 (10)	Rhodes (2–3)	Adkins (2–2)		2:50	33,111	29–22	box
52	June 4	@ Mariners	4–2	Garland (5–2)	García (3–4)	Koch (8)	2:36	36,340	30–22	box
53	June 5	@ Mariners	2–4	Franklin (3–4)	Schoeneweis (5–3)	Guardado (10)	2:58	40,050	30–23	box
54	June 6	@ Mariners	4–5	Hasegawa (2–3)	Koch (1–1)		3:13	36,462	30–24	box
55	June 8	Phillies	14–11	Buehrle (6–1)	Telemaco (0–2)	Politte (1)	2:57	33,114	31–24	box
56	June 9	Phillies	10–13	Milton (8–1)	Garland (5–3)		3:24	17,570	31–25	box
–	June 10	Phillies	Postponed (rain), rescheduled for August 30							
57	June 11	Braves	4–6	Wright (5–5)	Schoeneweis (5–4)		2:33	23,217	31–26	box
58	June 12	Braves	10–8	Loaiza (7–3)	Thomson (5–4)	Takatsu (1)	2:52	34,719	32–26	box
59	June 13	Braves	10–3	Buehrle (7–1)	Smith (0–3)		2:18	32,589	33–26	box
60	June 15	@ Marlins	7 – 5 (10)	Marte (2–2)	Borland (1–1)	Takatsu (2)	3:10	15,345	34–26	box
61	June 16	@ Marlins	0–4	Pavano (7–2)	Schoeneweis (5–5)		2:10	14,310	34–27	box
62	June 17	@ Marlins	1 – 2 (11)	Benítez (2–0)	Politte (0–2)		3:11	17,857	34–28	box
63	June 18	@ Expos	11–7	Cotts (1–3)	Ayala (0–6)	Marte (3)	3:02	4,576	35–28	box
64	June 19	@ Expos	14–17	Fikac (1–2)	Muñoz (0–1)	Cordero (2)	3:28	18,414	35–29	box
65	June 20	@ Expos	2–4	Cordero (2–1)	Garland (5–4)		1:54	6,546	35–30	box
66	June 21	Indians	1–5	Sabathia (5–3)	Schoeneweis (5–6)		2:38	29,722	35–31	box
67	June 22	Indians	11 – 9 (10)	Takatsu (4–0)	Jimenez (1–5)		3:38	27,922	36–31	box
68	June 23	Indians	5–9	Lee (7–1)	Buehrle (7–2)		2:31	21,654	36–32	box
69	June 24	Indians	7–1	Rauch (1–1)	Westbrook (6–4)		2:36	20,744	37–32	box
70	June 25	Cubs	4–7	Prior (2–1)	Garland (5–5)	Hawkins (10)	2:58	39,596	37–33	box
71	June 26	Cubs	6–3	Diaz (1–1)	Zambrano (8–3)	Takatsu (3)	2:37	39,553	38–33	box
72	June 27	Cubs	9–4	Loaiza (8–3)	Maddux (6–6)		2:48	38,526	39–33	box
73	June 29	@ Twins	6–2	Buehrle (8–2)	Silva (8–5)		2:04	24,704	40–33	box
74	June 30	@ Twins	9–6	García (5–7)	Radke (4–4)		2:08	25,433	41–33	box

July (11–16) – home (6–6) – road (5–10)

#	Date	Time	Opponent	Score	Win	Loss	Save	Attendance	Record	Box
75	July 1	@ Twins	2–1	Garland (6–5)	Santana (6–5)	Marte (4)	2:20	21,127	42–33	box
76	July 2	@ Cubs	2–6	Zambrano (9–3)	Loaiza (8–4)		2:44	39,625	42–34	box
77	July 3	@ Cubs	2 – 4 (6)	Maddux (7–6)	Diaz (1–2)	Wuertz (1)	1:40	39,528	42–35	box
78	July 4	@ Cubs	1–2	Hawkins (2–1)	Takatsu (4–1)		2:18	38,596	42–36	box
79	July 6	Angels	2–6	Lackey (6–8)	García (5–8)		2:36	26,209	42–37	box
80	July 7	Angels	0–12	Washburn (9–4)	Schoeneweis (5–7)		2:27	21,378	42–38	box
81	July 8	Angels	9–8	Marte (3–2)	Donnelly (1–2)		3:12	27,845	43–38	box
82	July 9	Mariners	6–2	Garland (7–5)	Piñeiro (4–10)		2:17	21,713	44–38	box
83	July 10	Mariners	3–2	Buehrle (9–2)	Thornton (0–2)	Takatsu (4)	2:13	37,405	45–38	box
84	July 11	Mariners	4–3	García (6–8)	Moyer (6–6)	Takatsu (5)	2:19	31,305	46–38	box
All-Star Break: AL defeats NL 9–4 at Minute Maid Park
85	July 15	@ Athletics	2–4	Harden (4–5)	Garland (7–6)	Dotel (17)	2:02	15,414	46–39	box
86	July 16	@ Athletics	1–5	Zito (5–7)	Buehrle (9–3)	Dotel (18)	2:28	40,891	46–40	box
87	July 17	@ Athletics	5–2	García (7–8)	Redman (6–7)	Takatsu (6)	2:36	26,285	47–40	box
88	July 18	@ Athletics	3–5	Mulder (14–2)	Loaiza (8–5)	Dotel (19)	2:19	33,274	47–41	box
89	July 19	@ Rangers	12–6	Schoeneweis (6–7)	Benoit (3–5)		3:06	28,805	48–41	box
90	July 20	@ Rangers	4–6	Almanzar (7–1)	Marte (3–3)	Cordero (29)	2:56	27,308	48–42	box
91	July 21	@ Indians	14–0	Buehrle (10–3)	Lee (10–2)		2:31	21,922	49–42	box
92	July 22	@ Indians	3–0	García (8–8)	Sabathia (6–5)	Takatsu (7)	2:31	23,168	50–42	box
93	July 23	Tigers	6–4	Loaiza (9–5)	Robertson (9–5)	Takatsu (8)	2:16	32,930	51–42	box
94	July 24	Tigers	7–6	Marte (4–3)	Urbina (3–5)		2:47	38,055	52–42	box
95	July 25	Tigers	2–9	Ledezma (1–0)	Garland (7–7)		3:08	26,716	52–43	box
96	July 26	Twins	2–6	Radke (7–6)	Buehrle (10–4)		2:53	38,362	52–44	box
97	July 27	Twins	3–7	Santana (9–6)	García (8–9)		2:58	37,528	52–45	box
98	July 28	Twins	4 – 5 (10)	Mulholland (3–3)	Takatsu (4–2)	Nathan (28)	3:07	32,605	52–46	box
99	July 29	@ Tigers	2–3	Johnson (8–8)	Schoeneweis (6–8)	Urbina (16)	2:40	26,110	52–47	box
100	July 30	@ Tigers	4–5	Yan (1–2)	Marte (4–4)	Urbina (17)	2:26	34,732	52–48	box
101	July 31	@ Tigers	2 – 3 (10)	Urbina (4–5)	Politte (0–3)		2:28	40,471	52–49	box

August (12–17) – home (5–10) – road (7–7)

#	Date	Time	Opponent	Score	Win	Loss	Save	Attendance	Record	Box
102	August 1	@ Tigers	6–4	García (9–9)	Bonderman (6–8)	Takatsu (9)	2:33	34,279	53–49	box
103	August 3	@ Royals	12–4	Contreras (1–0)	Wood (1–4)		2:48	13,981	54–49	box
104	August 4	@ Royals	0–11	Anderson (2–9)	Schoeneweis (6–9)		2:18	16,194	54–50	box
105	August 5	@ Royals	4–6	Greinke (4–8)	Garland (7–8)	Field (3)	2:19	15,863	54–51	box
106	August 6	Indians	2–3	Sabathia (8–6)	Buehrle (10–5)	Wickman (3)	2:43	23,811	54–52	box
107	August 7	Indians	5–6	Miller (5–3)	Takatsu (4–3)	Wickman (4)	2:26	32,790	54–53	box
108	August 8	Indians	3–2	Takatsu (5–3)	Betancourt (5–6)		2:48	25,897	55–53	box
109	August 9	Indians	11 – 13 (10)	Westbrook (10–5)	Diaz (1–3)		3:07	31,116	55–54	box
110	August 10	Royals	9–3	Garland (8–8)	Greinke (4–9)		2:36	20,506	56–54	box
111	August 11	Royals	2–4	May (9–12)	Buehrle (10–6)	Cerda (2)	2:38	18,396	56–55	box
112	August 12	Royals	3–2	García (10–9)	Serrano (0–1)	Takatsu (10)	2:13	22,399	57–55	box
113	August 13	@ Red Sox	8–7	Contreras (10–5)	Wakefield (8–7)	Takatsu (11)	3:23	35,028	58–55	box
114	August 14	@ Red Sox	3–4	Schilling (14–6)	Adkins (2–3)	Foulke (19)	2:34	35,012	58–56	box
115	August 15	@ Red Sox	5–4	Buehrle (11–6)	Arroyo (5–9)	Takatsu (12)	2:53	34,405	59–56	box
116	August 17	Tigers	8–11	Maroth (10–7)	García (10–10)	Urbina (21)	3:00	19,856	59–57	box
117	August 18	Tigers	9–2	Contreras (11–5)	Bonderman (6–10)		2:39	21,381	60–57	box
118	August 19	Tigers	4–8	Ledezma (11–5)	Garland (8–9)	Knotts (1)	2:34	24,554	60–58	box
119	August 20	Red Sox	1 – 10 (10)	Schilling (15–6)	Buehrle (11–7)		2:17	38,720	60–59	box
120	August 21	Red Sox	7–10	Arroyo (6–9)	Stewart (0–1)	Foulke (21)	3:10	37,303	60–60	box
121	August 22	Red Sox	5–6	Leskanic (2–5)	Marte (4–5)	Foulke (22)	3:05	34,355	60–61	box
122	August 23	@ Tigers	0–7	Bonderman (7–10)	Contreras (11–6)		2:26	25,220	60–62	box
123	August 24	@ Tigers	9–5	Garland (9–9)	Ledezma (3–1)		2:36	24,584	61–62	box
124	August 25	@ Tigers	4–5	Robertson (11–7)	Buehrle (11–8)		2:29	23,254	61–63	box
125	August 26	@ Indians	14–9	Cotts (2–3)	Durbin (5–6)		3:20	30,049	62–63	box
126	August 27	@ Indians	3–6	Sabathia (10–8)	Grilli (0–1)	Wickman (7)	2:34	30,527	62–64	box
127	August 28	@ Indians	5–3	Contreras (12–6)	Lee (10–6)	Takatsu (13)	2:40	37,374	63–64	box
128	August 29	@ Indians	0–9	Elarton (3–9)	Garland (9–10)		1:56	32,834	63–65	box
129	August 30	Phillies	9–8	Buehrle (12–8)	Hernández (2–5)	Takatsu (14)	2:47	5,747	64–65	box
130	August 31	Athletics	2–7	Harden (9–5)	Diaz (1–4)		2:31	18,841	64–66	box

September/October (19–13) – home (11–4) – road (8–9)

#	Date	Time	Opponent	Score	Win	Loss	Save	Attendance	Record	Box
131	September 1	Athletics	5–4	Takatsu (6–3)	Duchscherer (5–5)		2:36	21,564	65–66	box
132	September 2	Athletics	2–4	Redman (10–10)	Contreras (12–7)	Dotel (31)	2:55	17,579	65–67	box
133	September 3	Mariners	7–5	Garland (10–10)	Madritsch (3–2)	Takatsu (15)	2:50	21,716	66–67	box
134	September 4	Mariners	8–7	Buehrle (13–8)	Franklin (3–14)	Takatsu (16)	2:44	24,191	67–67	box
135	September 5	Mariners	6–2	Diaz (2–4)	Moyer (6–10)	Marte (5)	2:30	30,409	68–67	box
136	September 6	@ Rangers	7 – 4 (10)	Grilli (1–1)	Park (3–5)		2:50	31,251	69–67	box
137	September 7	@ Rangers	3–10	Rogers (16–7)	Contreras (12–8)		2:37	20,004	69–68	box
138	September 8	@ Rangers	5–2	García (11–10)	Wasdin (2–4)	Takatsu (17)	2:48	21,836	70–68	box
139	September 9	@ Rangers	7–3	Buehrle (14–8)	Young (1–2)		2:24	19,384	71–68	box
140	September 10	@ Angels	5–7	Rodríguez (3–1)	Bajenaru (0–1)	Percival (28)	3:03	42,431	71–69	box
141	September 11	@ Angels	13–6	Grilli (2–1)	Sele (8–3)		2:57	42,568	72–69	box
142	September 12	@ Angels	0–11	Colón (15–11)	Contreras (12–9)		2:39	41,932	72–70	box
143	September 14	@ Twins	2–10	Santana (18–6)	García (11–11)		2:32	22,145	72–71	box
144	September 15	@ Twins	1–6	Silva (12–8)	Buehrle (14–9)		2:12	20,612	72–72	box
145	September 16	@ Twins	1–10	Lohse (8–11)	Garland (10–11)		2:21	20,052	72–73	box
146	September 17	@ Tigers	10 – 11 (10)	Yan (3–4)	Takatsu (6–4)	Ennis (1)	3:21	23,132	72–74	box
147	September 18	@ Tigers	9 – 8 (12)	Marte (5–5)	Levine (3–4)		4:05	23,533	73–74	box
148	September 19	@ Tigers	6–1	García (12–11)	Bonderman (10–12)		2:44	19,269	74–74	box
149	September 20	Twins	2–8	Silva (13–8)	Buehrle (14–10)		2:09	21,991	74–75	box
150	September 21	Twins	8–6	Cotts (3–3)	Romero (7–2)	Takatsu (18)	2:39	14,771	75–75	box
151	September 22	Twins	7–6	Cotts (4–3)	Roa (2–3)		2:51	22,396	76–75	box
152	September 23	Royals	7–6	Marte (6–5)	Affeldt (3–4)		2:41	16,015	77–75	box
153	September 24	Royals	6–8	Gobble (9–8)	Diaz (2–5)		3:09	14,270	77–76	box
154	September 25	Royals	5–1	Buehrle (15–10)	Bautista (0–4)		2:13	20,625	78–76	box
155	September 26	Royals	5–1	Garland (11–11)	Anderson (5–12)	Marte (6)	2:00	18,949	79–76	box
156	September 27	@ Tigers	2–4	Knotts (6–6)	Grilli (2–2)	Yan (6)	2:04	12,495	79–77	box
157	September 28	@ Tigers	4–6	Germán (1–0)	Cotts (4–4)	Yan (7)	2:44	13,860	79–78	box
158	September 29	@ Tigers	11–2	García (13–11)	Johnson (8–15)		2:21	8,944	80–78	box
159	September 30	@ Royals	9–2	Buehrle (16–10)	Camp (2–2)		2:21	11,507	81–78	box
160	October 1	@ Royals	4–2	Garland (12–11)	Cerda (1–4)	Takatsu (19)	2:40	14,766	82–78	box
161	October 2	@ Royals	2–10	Anderson (6–12)	Grilli (2–3)		2:26	16,028	82–79	box
162	October 3	@ Royals	5–0	Contreras (13–9)	Greinke (8–11)		2:20	14,586	83–79	box

== Player stats ==
=== Batting ===
Note: G = Games played; AB = At bats; R = Runs scored; H = Hits; 2B = Doubles; 3B = Triples; HR = Home runs; RBI = Runs batted in; BB = Base on balls; SO = Strikeouts; AVG = Batting average; SB = Stolen bases

Player	G	AB	R	H	2B	3B	HR	RBI	BB	SO	AVG	SB
Roberto Alomar, 2B, DH	18	61	4	11	1	0	1	8	2	13	.180	0
Sandy Alomar Jr., C	50	146	15	35	4	0	2	14	11	13	.240	0
Joe Borchard, RF	63	201	26	35	4	1	9	20	19	57	.174	1
Mark Buehrle, P	35	3	0	0	0	0	0	0	0	2	.000	0
Jamie Burke, C	57	120	22	40	9	0	0	15	10	13	.333	0
Neal Cotts, P	56	1	0	1	1	0	0	0	0	0	1.000	0
Joe Crede, 3B	144	490	67	117	25	0	21	69	34	81	.239	1
Ben Davis, C	54	160	21	37	9	0	6	16	9	40	.231	1
Kelly Dransfeldt, SS, 3B	15	30	5	10	0	0	0	4	0	6	.333	0
Carl Everett, DH, OF	43	154	21	41	7	1	5	21	8	26	.266	1
Jon Garland, P	34	4	0	1	0	0	0	0	0	0	.250	0
Ross Gload, OF, 1B	110	234	28	75	16	0	7	44	20	37	.321	0
Willie Harris, 2B, SS	129	409	68	107	15	2	2	27	51	79	.262	19
Paul Konerko, 1B	155	563	84	156	22	0	41	117	69	107	.277	1
Carlos Lee, LF	153	591	103	180	37	0	31	99	54	86	.305	11
Esteban Loaiza, P	21	5	0	0	0	0	0	0	0	2	.000	0
Arnie Muñoz, P	11	1	0	0	0	0	0	0	0	0	.000	0
Miguel Olivo, C	46	141	21	38	7	2	7	26	10	29	.270	5
Magglio Ordóñez, RF	52	202	32	59	8	2	9	37	16	22	.292	0
Timo Perez, OF	103	293	38	72	12	0	5	40	15	29	.246	3
Aaron Rowand, CF	140	487	94	151	38	2	24	69	30	91	.310	17
Scott Schoeneweis, P	20	2	0	1	1	0	0	0	0	0	.500	0
Frank Thomas, DH	74	240	53	65	16	0	18	49	64	57	.271	0
Juan Uribe, 2B, SS, 3B	134	502	82	142	31	6	23	74	32	96	.283	9
Wilson Valdez, SS, 2B	19	43	8	10	1	0	1	4	2	5	.233	1
José Valentín, SS	125	450	73	97	20	3	30	70	43	139	.216	8
Team totals	162	5534	865	1481	284	19	242	823	499	1030	.268	78

=== Pitching ===
Note: W = Wins; L = Losses; ERA = Earned run average; G = Games pitched; GS = Games started; SV = Saves; IP = Innings pitched; H = Hits allowed; R = Runs allowed; ER = Earned runs allowed; HR = Home runs allowed; BB = Walks allowed; K = Strikeouts

Player	W	L	ERA	G	GS	SV	IP	H	R	ER	HR	BB	K
Jon Adkins	2	3	4.65	50	0	0	62.0	75	35	32	13	23	44
Jeff Bajenaru	0	1	10.80	9	0	0	8.1	15	10	10	0	7	8
Mark Buehrle	16	10	3.89	35	35	0	245.1	257	119	106	33	53	165
José Contreras	5	4	5.30	13	13	0	74.2	73	48	44	9	42	68
Neal Cotts	4	4	5.65	56	1	0	65.1	61	45	41	13	32	58
Vic Darensbourg	0	0	0.00	2	0	0	1.1	1	0	0	0	1	0
Felix Diaz	2	5	6.75	18	7	0	49.1	62	38	37	13	17	33
Freddy García	9	4	4.46	16	16	0	103.0	96	53	51	14	34	102
Jon Garland	12	11	4.89	34	33	0	217.0	223	125	118	34	78	113
Jason Grilli	2	3	7.40	8	8	0	45.0	52	38	37	11	20	26
Mike Jackson	2	0	5.01	45	0	0	46.2	55	27	26	7	17	26
Billy Koch	1	1	5.40	24	0	8	23.1	24	15	14	3	20	25
Esteban Loaiza	9	5	4.86	21	21	0	140.2	156	81	76	23	48	83
Dámaso Marte	6	5	3.42	74	0	6	73.2	56	28	28	10	38	68
Arnie Muñoz	0	1	10.05	11	1	0	14.1	20	16	16	4	13	11
Cliff Politte	0	3	4.38	54	0	1	51.1	52	26	25	6	27	48
Jon Rauch	1	1	6.23	2	2	0	8.2	16	6	6	0	4	4
Scott Schoeneweis	6	9	5.59	20	19	0	112.2	129	74	70	17	49	69
Josh Stewart	0	1	15.26	3	2	0	7.2	16	13	13	3	3	5
Shingo Takatsu	6	4	2.31	59	0	19	62.1	40	17	16	6	24	50
Dan Wright	0	4	8.15	4	4	0	17.2	24	17	16	5	12	6
Kelly Wunsch	0	0	0.00	3	0	0	2.0	2	0	0	0	1	1
Team totals	83	79	4.91	162	162	34	1432.1	1505	831	782	224	563	1013

== Farm system ==
Level	Team	League	Manager
AAA	Charlotte Knights	International League	Nick Capra
AA	Birmingham Barons	Southern League	Razor Shines
A	Winston-Salem Warthogs	Carolina League	Ken Dominguez and Nick Leyva
A	Kannapolis Intimidators	South Atlantic League	Chris Cron
Rookie	Bristol White Sox	Appalachian League	Jerry Hairston, Sr.
Rookie	Great Falls White Sox	Pioneer League	John Orton
