= 2004 Detroit Tigers season =

Major League Baseball season

2004 Detroit Tigers
- League: American League
- Division: Central
- Ballpark: Comerica Park
- City: Detroit, Michigan
- Record: 72–90 (.444)
- Divisional place: 4th
- Owners: Mike Ilitch
- General managers: Dave Dombrowski
- Managers: Alan Trammell
- Television: FSN Detroit (Mario Impemba, Rod Allen)
- Radio: WXYT (AM) (Jim Price, Dan Dickerson)

The 2004 Detroit Tigers season was the team's 104th season and its fifth at Comerica Park. It involved the Detroit Tigers attempting to win the American League Central. The team set a major league record with 11 players on the team hitting at least 10 home runs. The Tigers' 104th season ended with the team finishing in fourth place at 72–90, 29 games better than their disastrous season of the previous year. However, they were still 20 games behind the AL Central Champion Minnesota Twins.

The Tigers tied their own major league record for most home runs by a losing team when they hit seven homers in an 11–9 defeat to the Boston Red Sox on August 8.

== Offseason ==
- December 18, 2003: Al Levine was signed as a free agent with the Detroit Tigers.
- December 19, 2003: Rondell White was signed as a free agent with the Detroit Tigers.
- January 8, 2004 Acquired Carlos Guillén for Ramon Santiago and minor leaguer Juan Gonazalez.
- January 14, 2004: Bobby Estalella was signed as a free agent with the Detroit Tigers.
- February 6, 2004: Iván Rodríguez signed as a free agent with the Detroit Tigers.
- February 9, 2004: Bobby Estalella was released by the Detroit Tigers.
- March 29, 2004: Ugueth Urbina was signed as a free agent with the Detroit Tigers.

== Regular season ==
=== Standings ===
AL Central
Team	W	L	Pct.	GB	Home	Road
Minnesota Twins	92	70	.568	—	49‍–‍32	43‍–‍38
Chicago White Sox	83	79	.512	9	46‍–‍35	37‍–‍44
Cleveland Indians	80	82	.494	12	44‍–‍37	36‍–‍45
Detroit Tigers	72	90	.444	20	38‍–‍43	34‍–‍47
Kansas City Royals	58	104	.358	34	33‍–‍47	25‍–‍57

=== Record vs. opponents ===
2004 American League record Source: MLB Standings Grid – 2004
Team	ANA	BAL	BOS	CWS	CLE	DET	KC	MIN	NYY	OAK	SEA	TB	TEX	TOR	NL
Anaheim	—	6–3	4–5	5–4	4–5	7–2	7–0	5–4	5–4	10–9	13–7	6–1	9–10	4–5	7–11
Baltimore	3–6	—	10–9	2–4	3–3	6–0	6–3	4–5	5–14	0–7	7–2	11–8	5–2	11–8	5–13
Boston	5–4	9–10	—	4–2	3–4	6–1	4–2	2–4	11–8	8–1	5–4	14–5	4–5	14–5	9–9
Chicago	4–5	4–2	2–4	—	10–9	8–11	13–6	9–10	3–4	2–7	7–2	4–2	6–3	3–4	8–10
Cleveland	5–4	3–3	4–3	9–10	—	9–10	11–8	7–12	2–4	6–3	5–4	3–3	1–8	5–2	10–8
Detroit	2–7	0–6	1–6	11–8	10–9	—	8–11	7–12	4–3	4–5	5–4	3–3	4–5	4–2	9–9
Kansas City	0–7	3–6	2–4	6–13	8–11	11–8	—	7–12	1–5	2–7	2–5	3–6	4–5	3–3	6–12
Minnesota	4–5	5–4	4–2	10–9	12–7	12–7	12–7	—	2–4	2–5	5–4	4–5	5–2	4–2	11–7
New York	4–5	14–5	8–11	4–3	4–2	3–4	5–1	4–2	—	7–2	6–3	15–4	5–4	12–7	10–8
Oakland	9–10	7–0	1–8	7–2	3–6	5–4	7–2	5–2	2–7	—	11–8	7–2	11–9	6–3	10–8
Seattle	7–13	2–7	4–5	2–7	4–5	4–5	5–2	4–5	3–6	8–11	—	2–5	7–12	2–7	9–9
Tampa Bay	1–6	8–11	5–14	2–4	3–3	3–3	6–3	5–4	4–15	2–7	5–2	—	2–7	9–9	15–3
Texas	10–9	2–5	5–4	3–6	8–1	5–4	5–4	2–5	4–5	9–11	12–7	7–2	—	7–2	10–8
Toronto	5–4	8–11	5–14	4–3	2–5	2–4	3–3	2–4	7–12	3–6	7–2	9–9	2–7	—	8–10

=== Notable transactions ===
- June 7, 2004: Justin Verlander was drafted by the Detroit Tigers in the 1st round (2nd pick) of the 2004 amateur draft. Player signed October 25, 2004.

== Game log ==
2004 Game Log: 72–90 (Home: 38–43; Away: 34–47)
April: 12–11 (Home: 6–7; Away: 6–4)

#	Date	Opponent	Score	Win	Loss	Save	Attendance	Record	Streak
1	April 5	@ Blue Jays	7–0	Johnson (1–0)	Halladay (0–1)	—	47,817	1–0	W1
2	April 6	@ Blue Jays	7–3	Maroth (1–0)	Batista (0–1)	Robertson (1)	21,003	2–0	W2
3	April 7	@ Blue Jays	6–3	Bonderman (1–0)	Hentgen (0–1)	—	13,100	3–0	W3
4	April 8	Twins	10–6	Cornejo (1–0)	Fultz (0–1)	—	42,121	4–0	W4
5	April 10	Twins	5–10	Radke (1–0)	Johnson (1–1)	—	23,409	4–1	L1
6	April 11	Twins	6–5 (10)	Colyer (1–0)	Roa (1–1)	—	12,138	5–1	W1
7	April 13	Blue Jays	5–7	Adams (1–0)	Patterson (0–1)	Speier (1)	8,804	5–2	L1
8	April 14	Blue Jays	5–3	Robertson (1–0)	Lilly (0–1)	Patterson (1)	15,129	6–2	W1
9	April 15	Blue Jays	0–11	Halladay (1–2)	Johnson (1–2)	—	17,572	6–3	L1
10	April 16	@ Indians	3–10	Sabathia (1–0)	Cornejo (1–1)	—	18,507	6–4	L2
11	April 17	@ Indians	6–1	Maroth (2–0)	Davis (0–1)	—	18,955	7–4	W1
12	April 18	@ Indians	7–9	Lee (2–0)	Bonderman (1–1)	Riske (1)	19,240	7–5	L1
13	April 19	@ Indians	10–4	Levine (1–0)	Betancourt (0–2)	—	13,650	8–5	W1
14	April 20	@ Twins	4–6	Silva (2–0)	Johnson (1–3)	Nathan (3)	15,079	8–6	L1
15	April 21	@ Twins	11–8	Levine (2–0)	Radke (2–1)	Urbina (1)	15,158	9–6	W1
16	April 22	@ Twins	3–4	Santana (1–0)	Maroth (2–1)	Nathan (4)	14,857	9–7	L1
17	April 23	Indians	17–3	Bonderman (2–1)	Davis (0–2)	Yan (1)	22,008	10–7	W1
18	April 24	Indians	5–2	Urbina (1–0)	Stewart (0–1)	—	20,913	11–7	W2
19	April 25	Indians	2–3	Westbrook (1–1)	Johnson (1–4)	—	17,253	11–8	L1
20	April 27	Angels	4–10	Lackey (1–3)	Cornejo (1–2)	Shields (1)	18,208	11–9	L2
21	April 28	Angels	10–2	Maroth (3–1)	Colon (3–2)	—	17,175	12–9	W1
22	April 29	Angels	3–12	Washburn (4–1)	Robertson (1–1)	—	20,678	12–10	L1
23	April 30	Mariners	1–3 (10)	Myers (1–1)	Levine (2–1)	Guardado (4)	19,989	12–11	L2

May: 11–16 (Home: 5–7; Away: 6–9)

#	Date	Opponent	Score	Win	Loss	Save	Attendance	Record	Streak
24	May 1	Mariners	4–2	Bonderman (3–1)	Franklin (1–2)	Urbina (2)	16,407	13–11	W1
25	May 2	Mariners	2–12	Meche (1–2)	Cornejo (1–3)	—	13,720	13–12	L1
26	May 3	@ Angels	9–11	Gregg (1–0)	Levine (2–2)	Percival (8)	33,683	13–13	L2
27	May 4	@ Angels	4–11	Washburn (5–1)	Robertson (1–2)	—	34,920	13–14	L3
28	May 5	@ Angels	3–6	Escobar (2–1)	Johnson (1–5)	Percival (9)	39,827	13–15	L4
29	May 7	@ Rangers	8–7	Levine (3–2)	Ramirez (1–2)	Urbina (3)	41,095	14–15	W1
30	May 8	@ Rangers	15–16 (10)	Cordero (1–0)	Urbina (1–1)	—	45,017	14–16	L1
31	May 9	@ Rangers	5–3	Robertson (2–2)	Rogers (4–2)	Urbina (4)	25,034	15–16	W1
32	May 11	Athletics	4–5 (15)	Duchscherer (1–1)	Patterson (0–2)	Mecir (2)	15,859	15–17	L1
33	May 12	Athletics	1–2	Harden (2–2)	Bonderman (3–2)	Rhodes (7)	16,693	15–18	L2
34	May 13	Athletics	3–1	Maroth (4–1)	Redman (2–2)	Urbina (5)	21,712	16–18	W1
35	May 14	Rangers	7–1	Knotts (1–0)	Benoit (1–1)	Yan (2)	22,449	17–18	W2
36	May 15	Rangers	1–6	Rogers (5–2)	Robertson (2–3)	—	26,120	17–19	L1
37	May 16	Rangers	3–1	Johnson (2–5)	Drese (2–1)	Urbina (6)	21,615	18–19	W1
38	May 18	@ Athletics	5–1	Bonderman (4–2)	Harden (2–3)	—	11,842	19–19	W2
39	May 19	@ Athletics	2–6	Redman (3–2)	Maroth (4–2)	—	20,477	19–20	L1
40	May 20	@ Athletics	2–3	Hudson (5–1)	Walker (0–1)	Rhodes (8)	20,808	19–21	L2
41	May 21	@ Mariners	5–0	Robertson (3–3)	Meche (1–4)	—	39,102	20–21	W1
42	May 22	@ Mariners	8–4	Johnson (3–5)	Putz (0–1)	—	42,565	21–21	W2
43	May 23	@ Mariners	1–3	Garcia (2–3)	Bonderman (4–3)	Guardado (6)	44,850	21–22	L1
44	May 25	@ Royals	3–4	Grimsley (2–1)	Maroth (4–3)	Affeldt (1)	14,297	21–23	L2
45	May 26	@ Royals	3–7	May (2–6)	Knotts (1–1)	Affeldt (2)	19,534	21–24	L3
46	May 27	@ Royals	17–7	Robertson (4–3)	Anderson (1–7)	—	15,475	22–24	W1
47	May 28	Orioles	5–7	DuBose (4–3)	Johnson (3–6)	Julio (8)	23,298	22–25	L1
48	May 29	Orioles	4–8	Cabrera (3–1)	Bonderman (4–4)	Parrish (1)	30,440	22–26	L2
49	May 30	Orioles	3–7	Groom (2–0)	Urbina (1–2)	—	25,337	22–27	L3
50	May 31	Royals	8–4	Knotts (2–1)	May (2–7)	—	12,982	23–27	W1

June: 14–12 (Home: 10–4; Away: 4–8)

#	Date	Opponent	Score	Win	Loss	Save	Attendance	Record	Streak
51	June 1	Royals	3–5	Grimsley (3–1)	Yan (0–1)	Affeldt (4)	12,685	23–28	L1
52	June 2	Royals	2–0	Johnson (4–6)	Greinke (0–1)	Urbina (7)	12,186	24–28	W1
53	June 3	Royals	6–9	Reyes (2–0)	Bonderman (4–5)	Affeldt (5)	16,711	24–29	L1
54	June 4	@ Twins	2–3	Nathan (1–0)	Walker (0–2)	—	15,391	24–30	L2
55	June 5	@ Twins	6–0	Knotts (3–1)	Greisinger (2–5)	—	17,573	25–30	W1
56	June 6	@ Twins	5–6	Romero (3–1)	Yan (0–2)	Nathan (15)	20,378	25–31	L1
57	June 8	Braves	3–4 (10)	Reitsma (2–1)	Patterson (0–3)	Smoltz (9)	19,062	25–32	L2
58	June 9	Braves	4–2	Dingman (1–0)	Thomson (5–3)	Urbina (8)	20,577	26–32	W1
59	June 10	Braves	7–4	Maroth (5–3)	Alfonseca (5–2)	Urbina (9)	21,166	27–32	W2
60	June 11	Marlins	8–4	Knotts (4–1)	Phelps (1–1)	—	27,184	28–32	W3
61	June 12	Marlins	6–2	Robertson (5–3)	Penny (6–4)	Urbina (10)	38,524	29–32	W4
62	June 13	Marlins	2–9	Willis (6–3)	Johnson (4–7)	—	27,334	29–33	L1
63	June 15	@ Phillies	10–3	Bonderman (5–5)	Powell (0–1)	—	39,555	30–33	W1
–	June 16	@ Phillies	Postponed (rain); rescheduled for June 17						
64	June 17 (1)	@ Phillies	2–6	Myers (5–3)	Maroth (5–4)	—	44,551	30–34	L1
65	June 17 (2)	@ Phillies	5–4 (11)	Urbina (2–2)	Madson (4–2)	Patterson (2)	39,674	31–34	W1
66	June 18	@ Mets	2–3	Looper (1–1)	Patterson (0–4)	—	36,141	31–35	L1
67	June 19	@ Mets	3–4 (10)	Looper (2–1)	Dingman (1–1)	—	36,925	31–36	L2
68	June 20	@ Mets	1–6	Trachsel (7–5)	Bonderman (5–6)	—	39,446	31–37	L3
69	June 22	@ Royals	1–8	Gobble (4–4)	Maroth (5–5)	Field (2)	16,276	31–38	L4
70	June 23	@ Royals	3–7	May (5–8)	Knotts (4–2)	—	18,493	31–39	L5
71	June 24	@ Royals	12–3	Robertson (6–3)	George (1–1)	—	18,172	32–39	W1
72	June 25	Diamondbacks	2–1	Johnson (5–7)	Webb (3–8)	Urbina (11)	32,573	33–39	W2
73	June 26	Diamondbacks	7–6	Urbina (3–2)	Villafuerte (0–1)	—	33,579	34–39	W3
74	June 27	Diamondbacks	9–5	Walker (1–2)	Villafuerte (0–2)	—	32,751	35–39	W4
75	June 29	Indians	9–7 (11)	Dingman (2–1)	Jiménez (1–7)	—	30,457	36–39	W5
76	June 30	Indians	12–5	Robertson (7–3)	Davis (2–6)	—	27,665	37–39	W6

July: 13–15 (Home: 6–6; Away: 7–9)

#	Date	Opponent	Score	Win	Loss	Save	Attendance	Record	Streak
77	July 1	Indians	6–7 (10)	Riske (4–2)	Urbina (3–3)	White (1)	25,159	37–40	L1
78	July 2	@ Rockies	8–9 (10)	Chacon (1–5)	Walker (1–3)	—	47,585	37–41	L2
79	July 3	@ Rockies	6–11	Jennings (7–7)	Maroth (5–6)	—	48,131	37–42	L3
80	July 4	@ Rockies	8–10	Bernero (1–0)	Knotts (4–3)	Chacon (17)	26,944	37–43	L4
81	July 5	@ Yankees	3–10	Lieber (6–5)	Robertson (7–4)	—	52,608	37–44	L5
82	July 6	@ Yankees	9–1	Johnson (6–7)	Mussina (9–6)	—	41,772	38–44	W1
83	July 7	@ Yankees	10–8	Bonderman (6–6)	Halsey (1–2)	Urbina (12)	50,338	39–44	W2
84	July 8	@ Twins	1–7	Balfour (3–0)	Maroth (5–7)	—	14,087	39–45	L1
85	July 9	@ Twins	5–3	Knotts (5–3)	Silva (8–7)	Urbina (13)	22,678	40–45	W1
86	July 10	@ Twins	4–2	Robertson (8–4)	Radke (5–5)	Urbina (14)	26,646	41–45	W2
87	July 11	@ Twins	2–0	Johnson (7–7)	Santana (7–6)	—	21,618	42–45	W3
75th All-Star Game in Houston, Texas
88	July 15	Yankees	1–5	Contreras (7–3)	Bonderman (6–7)	—	38,902	42–46	L1
89	July 16	Yankees	8–0	Maroth (6–7)	Vazquez (10–6)	—	40,918	43–46	W1
90	July 17	Yankees	3–5	Hernandez (2–0)	Knotts (5–4)	Rivera (33)	41,857	43–47	L1
91	July 18	Yankees	4–2	Robertson (9–4)	Lieber (7–6)	Urbina (15)	40,132	44–47	W1
92	July 19	Twins	1–3	Mulholland (2–3)	Johnson (7–8)	Nathan (25)	21,369	44–48	L1
93	July 20	Twins	4–5 (10)	Balfour (4–1)	Urbina (3–4)	Nathan (26)	23,227	44–49	L2
94	July 21	Royals	4–2	Maroth (7–7)	May (7–10)	Walker (1)	17,607	45–49	W1
95	July 22	Royals	7–13	Gobble (6–7)	Knotts (5–5)	—	24,746	45–50	L1
96	July 23	@ White Sox	4–6	Loaiza (9–5)	Robertson (9–5)	Takatsu (8)	32,930	45–51	L2
97	July 24	@ White Sox	6–7	Marte (4–3)	Urbina (3–5)	—	38,055	45–52	L3
98	July 25	@ White Sox	9–2	Ledezma (1–0)	Garland (7–7)	—	26,716	46–52	W1
99	July 26	@ Indians	13–4	Maroth (8–7)	Lee (10–3)	—	18,359	47–52	W2
100	July 27	@ Indians	6–10	Sabathia (7–5)	Knotts (5–6)	—	19,090	47–53	L1
101	July 28	@ Indians	4–5	Elarton (1–8)	Walker (1–4)	Wickman (1)	23,213	47–54	L2
102	July 29	White Sox	3–2	Johnson (8–8)	Schoeneweis (6–8)	Urbina (16)	26,110	48–54	W1
103	July 30	White Sox	5–4	Yan (1–2)	Marte (4–4)	Urbina (17)	34,732	49–54	W2
104	July 31	White Sox	3–2 (10)	Urbina (4–5)	Politte (0–3)	—	40,471	50–54	W3

August: 11–17 (Home: 5–8; Away: 6–9)

#	Date	Opponent	Score	Win	Loss	Save	Attendance	Record	Streak
105	August 1	White Sox	4–6	Garcia (9–9)	Bonderman (6–8)	Takatsu (9)	34,279	50–55	L1
106	August 3	Rangers	4–5	Francisco (3–1)	Robertson (9–6)	Cordero (32)	19,894	50–56	L2
107	August 4	Rangers	0–8	Bacsik (1–0)	Johnson (8–9)	—	18,857	50–57	L3
108	August 5	Rangers	1–2	Drese (8–6)	Yan (1–3)	Cordero (33)	25,710	50–58	L4
109	August 6	Red Sox	4–3	Novoa (1–0)	Lowe (9–10)	Urbina (18)	40,674	51–58	W1
110	August 7	Red Sox	4–7	Martínez (12–4)	Bonderman (6–9)	—	42,607	51–59	L1
111	August 8	Red Sox	9–11	Wakefield (8–6)	Robertson (9–7)	Foulke (18)	40,098	51–60	L2
112	August 10	@ Athletics	4–5	Zito (8–8)	Johnson (8–10)	Dotel (24)	20,315	51–61	L3
113	August 11	@ Athletics	11–3	Ledezma (2–0)	Redman (8–9)	—	25,781	52–61	W1
114	August 12	@ Athletics	5–3	Maroth (9–7)	Duchscherer (4–4)	Urbina (19)	17,963	53–61	W2
115	August 13	@ Angels	5–3	Yan (2–3)	Percival (2–3)	Urbina (20)	43,580	54–61	W3
116	August 14	@ Angels	8–11	Gregg (5–1)	Novoa (1–1)	Rodriguez (9)	43,545	54–62	L1
117	August 15	@ Angels	2–3	Shields (6–2)	Johnson (8–11)	Percival (23)	42,850	54–63	L2
118	August 17	@ White Sox	11–8	Maroth (10–7)	Garcia (10–10)	Urbina (21)	19,856	55–63	W1
119	August 18	@ White Sox	2–9	Contreras (11–5)	Bonderman (6–10)	—	21,381	55–64	L1
120	August 19	@ White Sox	8–4	Ledezma (3–0)	Garland (8–9)	Knotts (1)	24,554	56–64	W1
121	August 20	Mariners	8–3	Robertson (10–7)	Villone (4–4)	—	32,791	57–64	W2
122	August 21	Mariners	11–10 (11)	Walker (2–4)	Atchison (1–1)	—	36,817	58–64	W3
123	August 22	Mariners	3–5	Meche (4–5)	Maroth (10–8)	Putz (3)	33,652	58–65	L1
124	August 23	White Sox	7–0	Bonderman (7–10)	Contreras (11–6)	—	25,220	59–65	W1
125	August 24	White Sox	5–9	Garland (9–9)	Ledezma (3–1)	—	24,584	59–66	L1
126	August 25	White Sox	5–4	Robertson (11–7)	Buehrle (11–8)	—	23,254	60–66	W1
127	August 26	@ Red Sox	1–4	Arroyo (7–9)	Johnson (8–12)	Foulke (24)	35,153	60–67	L1
128	August 27	@ Red Sox	3–5	Lowe (12–10)	Maroth (10–9)	Leskanic (3)	35,018	60–68	L2
129	August 28	@ Red Sox	1–5	Martínez (14–5)	Bonderman (7–11)	—	35,032	60–69	L3
130	August 29	@ Red Sox	1–6	Wakefield (11–7)	Ledezma (3–2)	—	34,268	60–70	L4
131	August 30	@ Royals	9–1	Robertson (12–7)	Wood (2–7)	—	19,429	61–70	W1
132	August 31	@ Royals	8–9	Affeldt (3–3)	Urbina (4–6)	—	19,471	61–71	L1

September: 10–17 (Home: 5–9; Away: 5–8)

#	Date	Opponent	Score	Win	Loss	Save	Attendance	Record	Streak
133	September 1	@ Royals	0–1	Greinke (7–9)	Maroth (10–10)	Affeldt (9)	19,039	61–72	L2
134	September 3	@ Devil Rays	4–2	Bonderman (8–11)	Kazmir (1–1)	Yan (3)	11,631	62–72	W1
–	September 4	@ Devil Rays	Postponed (Hurricane Frances); rescheduled for September 30						
–	September 5	@ Devil Rays	Postponed (Hurricane Frances); rescheduled for September 30						
135	September 6	Royals	7–3	Ledezma (4–2)	Bautista (0–1)	Knotts (2)	21,516	63–72	W2
136	September 7	Royals	2–6	Serrano (1–1)	Robertson (12–8)	—	17,462	63–73	L1
–	September 8	Royals	Postponed (rain); rescheduled for September 9						
137	September 9 (1)	Royals	5–26	Greinke (8–9)	Johnson (8–13)	—	N/A	63–74	L2
138	September 9 (2)	Royals	8–0	Bonderman (9–11)	May (9–17)	—	20,442	64–74	W1
139	September 10	Twins	1–4	Silva (11–8)	Maroth (10–11)	Nathan (40)	27,391	64–75	L1
140	September 11	Twins	2–3	Crain (2–0)	Levine (3–3)	Nathan (41)	28,931	64–76	L2
141	September 12	Twins	5–8	Mulholland (5–8)	Robertson (12–9)	Nathan (42)	23,208	64–77	L3
142	September 13	Twins	3–5	Radke (11–7)	Johnson (8–14)	Nathan (43)	9,962	64–78	L4
143	September 14	@ Indians	11–3	Bonderman (10–11)	Denney (0–1)	—	16,489	65–78	W1
144	September 15	@ Indians	3–5	Howry (2–1)	Yan (2–4)	Wickman (9)	15,411	65–79	L1
145	September 16	@ Indians	6–4	Walker (3–4)	Sabathia (11–10)	Yan (4)	15,943	66–79	W1
146	September 17	@ White Sox	11–10 (10)	Yan (3–4)	Takatsu (6–4)	Ennis (1)	23,132	67–79	W2
147	September 18	@ White Sox	8–9 (12)	Marte (5–5)	Levine (3–4)	—	23,533	67–80	L1
148	September 19	@ White Sox	1–6	Garcia (12–11)	Bonderman (10–12)	—	19,269	67–81	L2
149	September 20	Indians	3–1	Maroth (11–11)	Elarton (3–11)	Yan (5)	13,820	68–81	W1
150	September 21	Indians	7–8	Howry (3–1)	Yan (3–5)	Wickman (10)	11,351	68–82	L1
151	September 22	Indians	6–7	Westbrook (13–9)	Ledezma (4–3)	—	16,360	68–83	L2
152	September 24	@ Orioles	5–7	Parrish (6–3)	Yan (3–6)	—	25,846	68–84	L3
153	September 25	@ Orioles	0–3	Riley (2–4)	Bonderman (10–13)	Ryan (2)	29,598	68–85	L4
154	September 26	@ Orioles	0–5	Lopez (14–8)	Maroth (11–12)	—	41,178	68–86	L5
155	September 27	White Sox	4–2	Knotts (6–6)	Grilli (2–2)	Yan (6)	12,495	69–86	W1
156	September 28	White Sox	6–4	German (1–0)	Cotts (4–4)	Yan (7)	13,860	70–86	W2
157	September 29	White Sox	2–11	Garcia (13–11)	Johnson (8–15)	—	8.944	70–87	L1
158	September 30 (1)	@ Devil Rays	8–0	Bonderman (11–13)	Brazelton (6–8)	—	N/A	71–87	W1
159	September 30 (2)	@ Devil Rays	4–6	Harper (6–2)	Dingman (2–2)	Baez (30)	10,309	71–88	L1

October: 1–2 (Home: 1–2; Away: 0–0)

#	Date	Opponent	Score	Win	Loss	Save	Attendance	Record	Streak
160	October 1	Devil Rays	1–4	Bell (8–8)	Maroth (11–13)	—	20,612	71–89	L2
161	October 2	Devil Rays	5–1	Knotts (7–6)	Kazmir (2–3)	—	20,029	72–89	W1
162	October 3	Devil Rays	4–7	Halama (7–6)	Robertson (12–10)	—	22,471	72–90	L1

== Roster ==
2004 Detroit Tigers
Roster
Pitchers: 38 Jeremy Bonderman; 51 Steve Colyer; 34 Nate Cornejo; 57 Craig Dingman; 49 John Ennis; 62 Franklyn Germán; 21 Jason Johnson; 35 Gary Knotts; 41 Wilfredo Ledezma; 43 Al Levine; 46 Mike Maroth; 51 Roberto Novoa; 17 Danny Patterson; 37 Nate Robertson; 74 Ugueth Urbina; 45 Lino Urdaneta; 32 Jamie Walker; 59 Esteban Yan	Catchers: 26 Mike DiFelice; 7 Iván Rodríguez; Infielders: 9 Carlos Guillén; 20 Omar Infante; 15 Brandon Inge; 31 Eric Munson; 28 Greg Norton; 12 Carlos Peña; 55 Ryan Raburn; 30 Chris Shelton; 44 Jason Smith; 10 Fernando Viña; 25 Dmitri Young	Outfielders: 26 Curtis Granderson; 4 Bobby Higginson; 40 Nook Logan; 27 Craig Monroe; 19 Alex Sánchez; 33 Marcus Thames; 44 Andrés Torres; 24 Rondell White	Manager: 3 Alan Trammell; Coaches: 54 Bob Cluck (pitching); 29 Bruce Fields (hitting); 22 Kirk Gibson (bench); 18 Mick Kelleher (first base); 13 Lance Parrish (bullpen); 8 Juan Samuel (third base)

== Player stats ==
=== Batting ===
Note: G = Games played; AB = At bats; H = Hits; Avg. = Batting average; HR = Home runs; RBI = Runs batted in

Player	G	AB	H	Avg.	HR	RBI
Iván Rodríguez	135	527	176	.334	19	86
Carlos Guillén	136	522	166	.318	20	97
Omar Infante	142	503	133	.264	16	55
Carlos Peña	142	481	116	.241	27	82
Rondell White	121	448	121	.270	19	67
Bobby Higginson	131	448	110	.246	12	64
Craig Monroe	128	447	131	.293	18	72
Brandon Inge	131	408	117	.287	13	64
Dmitri Young	104	389	106	.272	18	60
Alex Sánchez	79	332	107	.322	2	26
Eric Munson	109	321	68	.212	19	49
Marcus Thames	61	165	42	.255	10	33
Jason Smith	61	155	37	.239	5	19
Nook Logan	47	133	37	.278	0	10
Fernando Viña	29	115	26	.226	0	7
Greg Norton	41	86	15	.174	2	2
Chris Shelton	27	46	9	.196	1	3
Ryan Raburn	12	29	4	.138	0	1
Curtis Granderson	9	25	6	.240	0	0
Mike DiFelice	13	22	3	.136	0	2
Andrés Torres	3	0	0	----	0	0
Pitcher totals	162	21	1	.048	0	1
Team totals	162	5623	1531	.272	201	800

=== Starting pitchers ===
Note: G = Games pitched; IP = Innings pitched; W = Wins; L = Losses; ERA = Earned run average; SO = Strikeouts

Player	G	IP	W	L	ERA	SO
Mike Maroth	33	217.0	11	13	4.31	108
Nate Robertson	34	196.2	12	10	4.90	155
Jason Johnson	33	196.2	8	15	5.13	125
Jeremy Bonderman	33	184.0	11	13	4.89	168
Gary Knotts	36	135.1	7	6	5.25	81
Nate Cornejo	5	25.2	1	3	8.42	12

=== Other pitchers ===
Note: G = Games pitched; IP = Innings pitched; W = Wins; L = Losses; ERA = Earned run average; SO = Strikeouts

Player	G	IP	W	L	ERA	SO
Wilfredo Ledezma	15	53.1	4	3	4.39	29

=== Relief pitchers ===
Note: G = Games pitched; IP = Innings pitched; W = Wins; L = Losses; SV = Saves; ERA = Earned run average; SO = Strikeouts

Player	G	IP	W	L	SV	ERA	SO
Ugueth Urbina	54	54.0	4	6	21	4.50	56
Esteban Yan	69	87.0	3	6	7	3.83	69
Al Levine	65	70.2	3	4	0	4.58	32
Jamie Walker	70	64.2	3	4	1	3.20	53
Danny Patterson	37	41.2	0	4	2	4.75	24
Steve Colyer	41	32.0	1	0	0	6.47	31
Craig Dingman	24	29.1	2	2	0	6.75	16
Roberto Novoa	16	21.0	1	1	0	5.57	15
John Ennis	12	16.0	0	0	1	8.44	13
Franklyn Germán	16	14.2	1	0	0	7.36	8
Lino Urdaneta	1	0.0	0	0	0	inf	0
Team Pitching Totals	162	1439.2	72	90	35	'4.93	995

== Farm system ==
Level	Team	League	Manager
AAA	Toledo Mud Hens	International League	Larry Parrish
AA	Erie SeaWolves	Eastern League	Rick Sweet
A	Lakeland Tigers	Florida State League	Gary Green
A	West Michigan Whitecaps	Midwest League	Matt Walbeck
A-Short Season	Oneonta Tigers	New York–Penn League	Mike Rojas
Rookie	GCL Tigers	Gulf Coast League	Kevin Bradshaw

LEAGUE CHAMPIONS: West Michigan
