= 2004 Oakland Athletics season =

2004 Oakland Athletics
- League: American League
- Division: West
- Ballpark: McAfee Coliseum
- City: Oakland, California
- Record: 91–71 (.562)
- Divisional place: 2nd
- Owners: Stephen Schott & Kenneth Hofmann
- General managers: Billy Beane
- Managers: Ken Macha
- Television: KICU-TV; FSN Bay Area (Ray Fosse, Hank Greenwald, Glen Kuiper)
- Radio: KFRC (Bill King, Ken Korach, Ray Fosse)

The Oakland Athletics' 2004 season involved the Athletics finishing second in the American League West with a record of 91 wins and 71 losses. The Athletics missed the postseason for the first time since 1999.

== Offseason ==
- October 9, 2003: Marco Scutaro was selected off waivers by the Oakland Athletics from the New York Mets.
- November 18, 2003: Ted Lilly was traded by the Oakland Athletics to the Toronto Blue Jays for Bobby Kielty.
- November 26, 2003: Mark Kotsay was traded by the San Diego Padres to the Oakland Athletics for Terrence Long and Ramón Hernández.
- December 3, 2003: Wayne Gomes was signed as a free agent with the Oakland Athletics.
- February 6, 2004: Eric Karros was signed as a free agent with the Oakland Athletics.
- March 15, 2004: Mike Oquist was signed as a free agent with the Oakland Athletics.

== Regular season ==
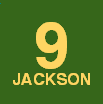
Reggie Jackson's number 9 was retired by the Oakland Athletics in 2004.

=== Season standings ===
AL West
Team	W	L	Pct.	GB	Home	Road
Anaheim Angels	92	70	.568	—	45‍–‍36	47‍–‍34
Oakland Athletics	91	71	.562	1	52‍–‍29	39‍–‍42
Texas Rangers	89	73	.549	3	51‍–‍30	38‍–‍43
Seattle Mariners	63	99	.389	29	38‍–‍44	25‍–‍55

=== Record vs. opponents ===
2004 American League record Source: MLB Standings Grid – 2004
Team	ANA	BAL	BOS	CWS	CLE	DET	KC	MIN	NYY	OAK	SEA	TB	TEX	TOR	NL
Anaheim	—	6–3	4–5	5–4	4–5	7–2	7–0	5–4	5–4	10–9	13–7	6–1	9–10	4–5	7–11
Baltimore	3–6	—	10–9	2–4	3–3	6–0	6–3	4–5	5–14	0–7	7–2	11–8	5–2	11–8	5–13
Boston	5–4	9–10	—	4–2	3–4	6–1	4–2	2–4	11–8	8–1	5–4	14–5	4–5	14–5	9–9
Chicago	4–5	4–2	2–4	—	10–9	8–11	13–6	9–10	3–4	2–7	7–2	4–2	6–3	3–4	8–10
Cleveland	5–4	3–3	4–3	9–10	—	9–10	11–8	7–12	2–4	6–3	5–4	3–3	1–8	5–2	10–8
Detroit	2–7	0–6	1–6	11–8	10–9	—	8–11	7–12	4–3	4–5	5–4	3–3	4–5	4–2	9–9
Kansas City	0–7	3–6	2–4	6–13	8–11	11–8	—	7–12	1–5	2–7	2–5	3–6	4–5	3–3	6–12
Minnesota	4–5	5–4	4–2	10–9	12–7	12–7	12–7	—	2–4	2–5	5–4	4–5	5–2	4–2	11–7
New York	4–5	14–5	8–11	4–3	4–2	3–4	5–1	4–2	—	7–2	6–3	15–4	5–4	12–7	10–8
Oakland	9–10	7–0	1–8	7–2	3–6	5–4	7–2	5–2	2–7	—	11–8	7–2	11–9	6–3	10–8
Seattle	7–13	2–7	4–5	2–7	4–5	4–5	5–2	4–5	3–6	8–11	—	2–5	7–12	2–7	9–9
Tampa Bay	1–6	8–11	5–14	2–4	3–3	3–3	6–3	5–4	4–15	2–7	5–2	—	2–7	9–9	15–3
Texas	10–9	2–5	5–4	3–6	8–1	5–4	5–4	2–5	4–5	9–11	12–7	7–2	—	7–2	10–8
Toronto	5–4	8–11	5–14	4–3	2–5	2–4	3–3	2–4	7–12	3–6	7–2	9–9	2–7	—	8–10

=== Transactions ===
- April 17, 2004: Kirk Saarloos was traded by the Houston Astros to the Oakland Athletics for Chad Harville.
- August 3, 2004: Eric Karros was released by the Oakland Athletics.

=== Roster ===
2004 Oakland Athletics
Roster
Pitchers: 64 Joe Blanton; 54 Chad Bradford; 46 Santiago Casilla; 28 Octavio Dotel; 58 Justin Duchscherer; 29 Chris Hammond; 40 Rich Harden; 31 Chad Harville; 15 Tim Hudson; 57 Justin Lehr; 45 Jim Mecir; 20 Mark Mulder; 55,18 Mark Redman; 53 Arthur Rhodes; 73 Ricardo Rincón; 31 Kirk Saarloos; 75 Barry Zito	Catchers: 17 Adam Melhuse; 26 Damian Miller; 6 Mike Rose; Infielders: 47 Ramon Castro; 3 Eric Chavez; 7 Bobby Crosby; 44 Erubiel Durazo; 12 Esteban Germán; 10 Scott Hatteberg; 32 Eric Karros; 2 Mark McLemore; 11 Frank Menechino; 49 Marco Scutaro	Outfielders: 22 Eric Byrnes; 24 Jermaine Dye; 23 Bobby Kielty; 21 Mark Kotsay; 13 Billy McMillon; 33 Nick Swisher	Manager: 39 Ken Macha; Coaches: 35 Brad Fischer (first base); 52 Bob Geren (bullpen); 48 Dave Hudgens (hitting); 46 Chris Speier (bench); 38 Ron Washington (third base); 41 Curt Young (pitching)

== Player stats ==
=== Batting ===
==== Starters by position ====
Note: Pos = Position; G = Games played; AB = At bats; H = Hits; Avg. = Batting average; HR = Home runs; RBI = Runs batted in

Pos	Player	G	AB	H	Avg.	HR	RBI
C	Damian Miller	110	397	108	.272	9	58
1B	Scott Hatteberg	152	550	156	.284	15	82
2B	Marco Scutaro	137	455	124	.273	7	43
SS	Bobby Crosby	151	545	130	.239	22	64
3B	Eric Chavez	125	475	131	.276	29	77
LF	Eric Byrnes	143	569	161	.283	20	73
CF	Mark Kotsay	148	606	190	.314	15	63
RF	Jermaine Dye	137	532	141	.265	23	80
DH	Erubiel Durazo	142	511	164	.321	22	88

==== Other batters ====
Note: G = Games played; AB = At bats; H = Hits; Avg. = Batting average; HR = Home runs; RBI = Runs batted in

Player	G	AB	H	Avg.	HR	RBI
Mark McLemore	77	250	62	.248	2	21
Bobby Kielty	83	238	51	.214	7	31
Adam Melhuse	69	214	55	.257	11	31
Eric Karros	40	103	20	.194	2	11
Billy McMillon	52	92	17	.185	3	11
Nick Swisher	20	60	15	.250	2	8
Esteban Germán	31	60	15	.250	0	7
Frank Menechino	13	33	3	.091	0	1
Ramón Castro	9	15	2	.133	0	3
Mike Rose	2	2	0	.000	0	0

=== Pitching ===
==== Starting pitchers ====
Note: G = Games pitched; IP = Innings pitched; W = Wins; L = Losses; ERA = Earned run average; SO = Strikeouts

Player	G	IP	W	L	ERA	SO
Mark Mulder	33	225.2	17	8	4.43	140
Barry Zito	34	213.0	11	11	4.48	163
Mark Redman	32	191.0	11	12	4.71	102
Rich Harden	31	189.2	11	7	3.99	167
Tim Hudson	27	188.2	12	6	3.53	103

==== Other pitchers ====
Note: G = Games pitched; IP = Innings pitched; W = Wins; L = Losses; ERA = Earned run average; SO = Strikeouts

Player	G	IP	W	L	ERA	SO
Kirk Saarloos	6	24.1	2	1	4.44	10

===== Relief pitchers =====
Note: G = Games pitched; IP = Innings pitched; W = Wins; L = Losses; SV = Saves; ERA = Earned runs average; SO = Strikeouts

Player	G	IP	W	L	SV	ERA	SO
Justin Duchscherer	53	96.1	7	6	0	3.27	59
Chad Bradford	68	59.0	5	7	1	4.42	34
Chris Hammond	41	53.2	4	1	1	2.68	34
Octavio Dotel	45	50.2	6	2	22	4.09	72
Jim Mecir	65	47.2	0	5	2	3.59	49
Ricardo Rincón	67	44.0	1	1	0	3.68	40
Arthur Rhodes	37	38.2	3	3	9	5.12	34
Justin Lehr	27	32.2	1	1	0	5.23	16
Joe Blanton	3	8.0	0	0	0	5.63	6
Santiago Casilla	4	5.2	0	0	0	12.71	5
Chad Harville	3	2.2	0	0	0	3.38	0

== Farm system ==
Level	Team	League	Manager
AAA	Sacramento River Cats	Pacific Coast League	Tony DeFrancesco
AA	Midland RockHounds	Texas League	Webster Garrison
A	Modesto A's	California League	Von Hayes
A	Kane County Cougars	Midwest League	Dave Joppie
A-Short Season	Vancouver Canadians	Northwest League	Dennis Rogers
Rookie	AZL Athletics	Arizona League	Ruben Escalera

LEAGUE CHAMPIONS: Sacramento, Modesto
