= 2004 Minnesota Twins season =

2004 Minnesota Twins
- American league Central champions
- League: American League
- Division: Central
- Ballpark: Hubert H. Humphrey Metrodome
- City: Minneapolis
- Record: 92–70 (.568)
- Divisional place: 1st
- Owners: Carl Pohlad
- General managers: Terry Ryan
- Managers: Ron Gardenhire
- Television: KSTC-TV/KSTP-TV; FSN North (Bert Blyleven, Dick Bremer)
- Radio: 830 WCCO AM (Herb Carneal, John Gordon, Dan Gladden, Jack Morris)

The 2004 Minnesota Twins season was the 104th season in the franchise's history and its 44th season in the Twin Cities. The Twins were managed by Ron Gardenhire and played in the Metrodome.

The Twins finished with a 92–70 record and won the American League Central. They advanced to the ALDS, but they lost the series to the New York Yankees in four games. It was the second year in a row in which the Yankees eliminated the Twins in the ALDS.

Twins pitcher Johan Santana won the 2004 Cy Young Award on a unanimous vote.

== Offseason ==
- November 14, 2003: Traded catcher A. J. Pierzynski and cash to the San Francisco Giants. Received pitchers Joe Nathan, Francisco Liriano, and Boof Bonser.
- November 20, 2003: Selected pitcher Matt Guerrier off waivers from the Pittsburgh Pirates.
- December 3, 2003: Traded pitcher Eric Milton to the Philadelphia Phillies. Received pitcher Carlos Silva, IF Nick Punto, and a player to be named later. The Philadelphia Phillies sent Bobby Korecky (minors) (December 17) to the Minnesota Twins to complete the trade.
- December 18, 2003: Signed Henry Blanco as a free agent.
- January 8, 2004: Signed Aaron Fultz as a free agent.
- February 6, 2004: Signed José Offerman as a free agent.

== Spring training ==
The Twins posted a 20–10 record in spring training, the best of any major league team in 2004. This includes split-squad games but not ties or exhibition games.

== Regular season ==
=== Offense ===
For a playoff team, the offense was not strong. This was partly due to injuries and starters absent from the lineup. Lew Ford surprised many by batting .299 in his first full year in the major leagues. Free agent acquisition José Offerman saw a majority of time in the designated hitter spot, but hit only .256 with two home runs. Shannon Stewart did hit .304, but injuries limited him to 378 at bats. In 107 at bats, Mauer was able to hit .307. In his absence, catcher Henry Blanco hit only .206. First baseman Doug Mientkiewicz's hitting continued to decline, as he hit .246 with five home runs before being dealt to the Boston Red Sox.

Nine players hit ten or more home runs. When the Twins hit their record 225 homers in 1963, only eight players reached double figures.

Team Leaders
Statistic	Player	Quantity
HR	Corey Koskie	25
RBI	Torii Hunter	81
BA	Lew Ford	.299
Runs	Lew Ford	89

=== Pitching ===
Brad Radke was the opening day starter, but he was soon overshadowed by Johan Santana's Cy Young year. Radke, Santana, and Carlos Silva anchored the starting rotation. Unfortunately, Kyle Lohse had a bad year that saw his ERA balloon to 5.34, while the fifth spot in the rotation was nebulous. (41-year-old Terry Mulholland made 15 starts, while Seth Greisinger made nine.)

The Twins set their club record of 32 consecutive scoreless innings in June, which included back-to-back-to-back shutouts by Radke, Santana and Lohse.

In the bullpen, Joe Nathan blew everyone away during his first year as a closer at any level, earning 44 saves with a 1.62 ERA. Juan Rincón and J. C. Romero continued playing as excellent set-up men, while the rest of the bullpen was weaker. Romero set a Twins record by going 36 innings over 32 appearances without allowing a run to score.

Santana finished the year with 13 straight wins without a loss, then went 1–0 with a no-decision in the American League Division Series. He set the Twins record with 265 strikeouts this season.

Team Leaders
Statistic	Player	Quantity
ERA	Johan Santana	2.61
Wins	Johan Santana	20
Saves	Joe Nathan	44
Strikeouts	Johan Santana	265

=== Defense ===
Blanco and Mauer (when he played) were solid catchers, both with .991 fielding percentages. Mientkiewicz was a one-time Gold Glove winner, but his successor Justin Morneau surprised people with his .995 fielding percentage. Luis Rivas was dependable at second base, while Cristian Guzmán could turn exceptional plays at shortstop. (It was the routine ones that fooled him.) Corey Koskie was defensively average, while the outfield quartet of Hunter, Jacque Jones, Shannon Stewart and Ford were solid – especially Hunter, who won a Gold Glove.

=== Season standings ===
AL Central
Team	W	L	Pct.	GB	Home	Road
Minnesota Twins	92	70	.568	—	49‍–‍32	43‍–‍38
Chicago White Sox	83	79	.512	9	46‍–‍35	37‍–‍44
Cleveland Indians	80	82	.494	12	44‍–‍37	36‍–‍45
Detroit Tigers	72	90	.444	20	38‍–‍43	34‍–‍47
Kansas City Royals	58	104	.358	34	33‍–‍47	25‍–‍57

=== Record vs. opponents ===
2004 American League record Source: MLB Standings Grid – 2004
Team	ANA	BAL	BOS	CWS	CLE	DET	KC	MIN	NYY	OAK	SEA	TB	TEX	TOR	NL
Anaheim	—	6–3	4–5	5–4	4–5	7–2	7–0	5–4	5–4	10–9	13–7	6–1	9–10	4–5	7–11
Baltimore	3–6	—	10–9	2–4	3–3	6–0	6–3	4–5	5–14	0–7	7–2	11–8	5–2	11–8	5–13
Boston	5–4	9–10	—	4–2	3–4	6–1	4–2	2–4	11–8	8–1	5–4	14–5	4–5	14–5	9–9
Chicago	4–5	4–2	2–4	—	10–9	8–11	13–6	9–10	3–4	2–7	7–2	4–2	6–3	3–4	8–10
Cleveland	5–4	3–3	4–3	9–10	—	9–10	11–8	7–12	2–4	6–3	5–4	3–3	1–8	5–2	10–8
Detroit	2–7	0–6	1–6	11–8	10–9	—	8–11	7–12	4–3	4–5	5–4	3–3	4–5	4–2	9–9
Kansas City	0–7	3–6	2–4	6–13	8–11	11–8	—	7–12	1–5	2–7	2–5	3–6	4–5	3–3	6–12
Minnesota	4–5	5–4	4–2	10–9	12–7	12–7	12–7	—	2–4	2–5	5–4	4–5	5–2	4–2	11–7
New York	4–5	14–5	8–11	4–3	4–2	3–4	5–1	4–2	—	7–2	6–3	15–4	5–4	12–7	10–8
Oakland	9–10	7–0	1–8	7–2	3–6	5–4	7–2	5–2	2–7	—	11–8	7–2	11–9	6–3	10–8
Seattle	7–13	2–7	4–5	2–7	4–5	4–5	5–2	4–5	3–6	8–11	—	2–5	7–12	2–7	9–9
Tampa Bay	1–6	8–11	5–14	2–4	3–3	3–3	6–3	5–4	4–15	2–7	5–2	—	2–7	9–9	15–3
Texas	10–9	2–5	5–4	3–6	8–1	5–4	5–4	2–5	4–5	9–11	12–7	7–2	—	7–2	10–8
Toronto	5–4	8–11	5–14	4–3	2–5	2–4	3–3	2–4	7–12	3–6	7–2	9–9	2–7	—	8–10

=== Notable transactions ===
- April 9: The Toronto Blue Jays selected Mike Nakamura off waivers.
- April 11: Signed Joe Beimel as a free agent.
- April 13: Signed Terry Mulholland as a free agent.
- July 31, 2004: As part of a 4-team trade, traded Doug Mientkiewicz to the Boston Red Sox. Received Justin Jones (minors) from the Chicago Cubs. In addition, the Boston Red Sox sent Nomar Garciaparra and Matt Murton to the Chicago Cubs; the Montreal Expos sent Orlando Cabrera to the Boston Red Sox; and the Chicago Cubs sent Brendan Harris, Alex Gonzalez, and Francis Beltrán to the Montreal Expos.
- November 23, 2004: Signed Juan Castro as a free agent.
- November 24, 2004: Signed Mike Redmond as a free agent.

=== Roster ===
2004 Minnesota Twins
Roster
Pitchers: 19 Grant Balfour; 50 Joe Beimel; 28 Jesse Crain; 31 J. D. Durbin; 38 Aaron Fultz; 58 Seth Greisinger; 54 Matt Guerrier; 49 Kyle Lohse; 46,45 Terry Mulholland; 36 Joe Nathan; 51 Carlos Pulido; 22 Brad Radke; 39 Juan Rincón; 71 Joe Roa; 33 J. C. Romero; 57 Johan Santana; 52 Carlos Silva; 56 Brad Thomas	Catchers: 21 Henry Blanco; 26 Pat Borders; 44 Rob Bowen; 24 Matthew LeCroy; 7 Joe Mauer; Infielders: 18 Jason Bartlett; 5 Michael Cuddyer; 15 Cristian Guzmán; 47 Corey Koskie; 16 Doug Mientkiewicz; 27 Justin Morneau; 30 José Offerman; 4 Augie Ojeda; 17 Alex Prieto; 8 Nick Punto; 2 Luis Rivas; 32 Terry Tiffee	Outfielders: 20 Lew Ford; 48 Torii Hunter; 11 Jacque Jones; 1 Jason Kubel; 41 Michael Restovich; 12 Michael Ryan; 23 Shannon Stewart	Manager: 35 Ron Gardenhire; Coaches: 40 Rick Anderson (pitching); 62 Al Newman (third base); 9 Steve Liddle (bench); 43 Rick Stelmaszek (bullpen); 45,46 Scott Ullger (hitting); 13 Jerry White (first base)

== Postseason ==
The Twins entered and exited the postseason nearly the same as the previous season, losing to the Yankees, 3 games to 1 in the Division Series. The Twins won the first game by a score of 2–0, with starting pitcher Johan Santana getting the win. However, the Twins lost the next three games, with the Yankees taking the series 3 games to 1. Game 1 of this series represented the last postseason victory for the Twins until 2023. Game 2 began a 18-game postseason losing streak for the team, tied with the 1975–79 Chicago Blackhawks for the longest such losing streak in North American sports history. The Yankees would go on to be upset by the Boston Red Sox on their way to breaking the curse.

See 2004 American League Division Series.

== Player stats ==
=== Batting ===
==== Starters by position ====
Note: Pos = Position; G = Games played; AB = At bats; H = Hits; Avg. = Batting average; HR = Home runs; RBI = Runs batted in

Pos	Player	G	AB	H	Avg.	HR	RBI
C	Henry Blanco	114	315	65	.206	10	37
1B	Doug Mientkiewicz	78	284	70	.246	5	25
2B	Luis Rivas	109	336	86	.256	10	34
SS	Cristian Guzmán	145	576	158	.274	8	46
3B	Corey Koskie	118	422	106	.251	25	71
LF	Lew Ford	154	569	170	.299	15	72
CF	Torii Hunter	138	520	141	.271	23	81
RF	Jacque Jones	151	555	141	.254	24	80
DH	José Offerman	77	172	44	.256	2	22

==== Other batters ====
Note: G = Games played; AB = At bats; H = Hits; Avg. = Batting average; HR = Home runs; RBI = Runs batted in

Player	G	AB	H	Avg.	HR	RBI
Shannon Stewart	92	378	115	.304	11	47
Michael Cuddyer	115	339	89	.263	12	45
Justin Morneau	74	280	76	.271	19	58
Matt LeCroy	88	264	71	.269	9	39
Joe Mauer	35	107	33	.308	6	17
Nick Punto	38	91	23	.253	2	12
Michael Ryan	36	71	17	.239	0	7
Jason Kubel	23	60	18	.300	2	7
Augie Ojeda	30	59	20	.339	2	7
Michael Restovich	29	47	12	.255	2	6
Terry Tiffee	17	44	12	.273	2	8
Pat Borders	19	42	12	.286	0	5
Alex Prieto	16	32	8	.250	1	4
Rob Bowen	17	27	3	.111	1	2
Jason Bartlett	8	12	1	.083	0	1

=== Pitching ===
==== Starting pitchers ====
Note: G = Games; IP = Innings pitched; W = Wins; L = Losses; ERA = Earned run average; SO = Strikeouts

Player	G	IP	W	L	ERA	SO
Johan Santana	34	228.0	20	6	2.61	265
Brad Radke	34	219.2	11	8	3.48	143
Carlos Silva	33	203.0	14	8	4.21	76
Kyle Lohse	35	194.0	9	13	5.34	111

==== Other pitchers ====
Note: G = Games pitched; IP = Innings pitched; W = Wins; L = Losses; ERA = Earned run average; SO = Strikeouts

Player	G	IP	W	L	ERA	SO
Terry Mulholland	39	123.1	5	9	5.18	60
Seth Greisinger	12	51.0	2	5	6.18	36
Matt Guerrier	9	19.0	0	1	5.68	11
J.D. Durbin	4	7.1	0	1	7.36	6

==== Relief pitchers ====
Note: G = Games; W = Wins; L = Losses; SV = Saves; ERA = Earned run average; SO = Strikeouts

Player	G	W	L	SV	ERA	SO
Joe Nathan	73	1	2	44	1.62	89
Juan Rincón	77	11	6	2	2.63	106
J.C. Romero	74	7	4	1	3.51	69
Aaron Fultz	55	3	3	1	5.04	37
Joe Roa	48	2	3	0	4.50	47
Grant Balfour	36	4	1	0	4.35	42
Jesse Crain	22	3	0	0	2.00	14
Carlos Pulido	6	0	0	0	8.74	9
Brad Thomas	3	0	0	0	16.88	0
Joe Beimel	3	0	0	0	43.20	2

== Miscellaneous ==
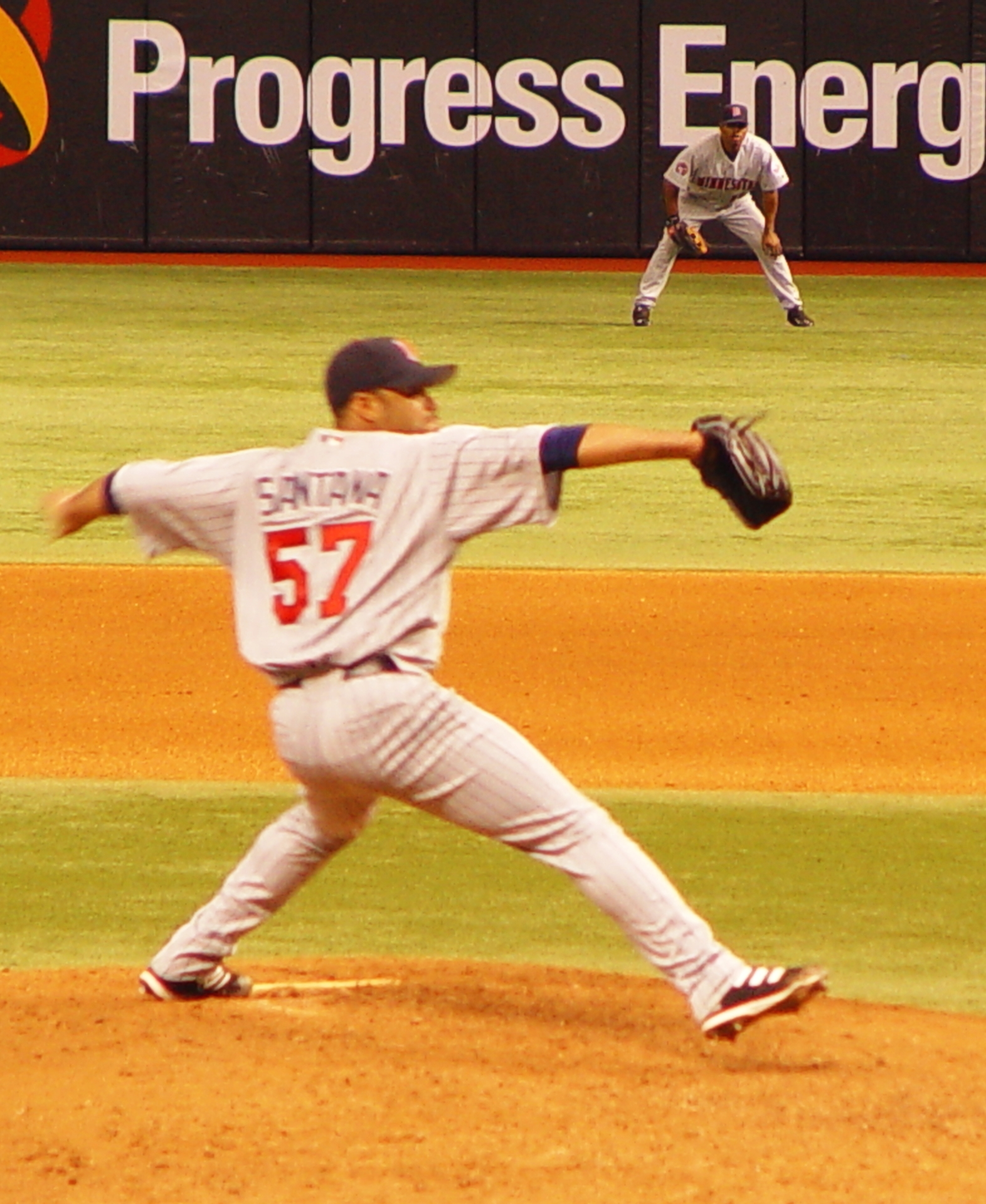
2004 AL Cy Young Award winner Johan Santana.

- Johan Santana won the Cy Young Award, becoming the third player in Minnesota Twins history to do so. The first two were Jim Perry in 1970 and Frank Viola in 1988.
- The lone representative of the Twins in the All-Star Game was closer Joe Nathan.
- On July 25, Paul Molitor was inducted into the Baseball Hall of Fame. He is the second St. Paul native to enter (following Dave Winfield) and, from 1996 on, has played with, coached for and managed the Twins.
- The highest paid Twin in 2004 was Brad Radke at $10,750,000; followed by Torii Hunter at $6,500,000.
- Earl Battey was inducted into the Twins Hall of Fame.

== Other post-season awards ==
- Calvin R. Griffith Award (Most Valuable Twin) – Johan Santana
- Joseph W. Haynes Award (Twins Pitcher of the Year) – Johan Santana
- Bill Boni Award (Twins Outstanding Rookie) – Joe Mauer
- Charles O. Johnson Award (Most Improved Twin) – Juan Rincón
- Dick Siebert Award (Upper Midwest Player of the Year) – Keith Foulke
  - The above awards are voted on by the Twin Cities chapter of the BBWAA
- Carl R. Pohlad Award (Outstanding Community Service) – Torii Hunter
- Sherry Robertson Award (Twins Outstanding Farm System Position Player) – Jason Kubel
- Jim Rantz Award (Twins Outstanding Farm System Pitcher) – Scott Baker

== Farm system ==
Level	Team	League	Manager
AAA	Rochester Red Wings	International League	Phil Roof
AA	New Britain Rock Cats	Eastern League	Stan Cliburn
A	Fort Myers Miracle	Florida State League	Jose Marzan
A	Quad Cities River Bandits	Midwest League	Kevin Boles
Rookie	Elizabethton Twins	Appalachian League	Ray Smith
Rookie	GCL Twins	Gulf Coast League	Riccardo Ingram
