= 2004 Seattle Mariners season =

2004 Seattle Mariners
- League: American League
- Division: West
- Ballpark: Safeco Field
- City: Seattle, Washington
- Record: 63–99 (.389)
- Divisional place: 4th
- Owners: Hiroshi Yamauchi (represented by Howard Lincoln)
- General manager: Bill Bavasi
- Manager: Bob Melvin
- Television: KSTW 11; FSN Northwest
- Radio: KOMO 1000 AM (Dave Niehaus, Rick Rizzs, Ron Fairly, Dave Valle, Dave Henderson)

The Seattle Mariners 2004 season was their 28th, and they finished last in the American League West at 63–99. This was their first losing season since 1999, and their first time finishing last in their division since 1992. Ichiro Suzuki set the major league record for hits in a season on October 1, breaking George Sisler's 84-year-old mark with a pair of early singles.

== Offseason ==
- December 15, 2003: Quinton McCracken traded by the Arizona Diamondbacks to the Mariners for Greg Colbrunn and cash.
- December 19: Scott Spiezio signed as a free agent.

== Regular season ==
=== Season standings ===
AL West
Team	W	L	Pct.	GB	Home	Road
Anaheim Angels	92	70	.568	—	45‍–‍36	47‍–‍34
Oakland Athletics	91	71	.562	1	52‍–‍29	39‍–‍42
Texas Rangers	89	73	.549	3	51‍–‍30	38‍–‍43
Seattle Mariners	63	99	.389	29	38‍–‍44	25‍–‍55

==== Record vs. opponents ====
2004 American League record Source: MLB Standings Grid – 2004
Team	ANA	BAL	BOS	CWS	CLE	DET	KC	MIN	NYY	OAK	SEA	TB	TEX	TOR	NL
Anaheim	—	6–3	4–5	5–4	4–5	7–2	7–0	5–4	5–4	10–9	13–7	6–1	9–10	4–5	7–11
Baltimore	3–6	—	10–9	2–4	3–3	6–0	6–3	4–5	5–14	0–7	7–2	11–8	5–2	11–8	5–13
Boston	5–4	9–10	—	4–2	3–4	6–1	4–2	2–4	11–8	8–1	5–4	14–5	4–5	14–5	9–9
Chicago	4–5	4–2	2–4	—	10–9	8–11	13–6	9–10	3–4	2–7	7–2	4–2	6–3	3–4	8–10
Cleveland	5–4	3–3	4–3	9–10	—	9–10	11–8	7–12	2–4	6–3	5–4	3–3	1–8	5–2	10–8
Detroit	2–7	0–6	1–6	11–8	10–9	—	8–11	7–12	4–3	4–5	5–4	3–3	4–5	4–2	9–9
Kansas City	0–7	3–6	2–4	6–13	8–11	11–8	—	7–12	1–5	2–7	2–5	3–6	4–5	3–3	6–12
Minnesota	4–5	5–4	4–2	10–9	12–7	12–7	12–7	—	2–4	2–5	5–4	4–5	5–2	4–2	11–7
New York	4–5	14–5	8–11	4–3	4–2	3–4	5–1	4–2	—	7–2	6–3	15–4	5–4	12–7	10–8
Oakland	9–10	7–0	1–8	7–2	3–6	5–4	7–2	5–2	2–7	—	11–8	7–2	11–9	6–3	10–8
Seattle	7–13	2–7	4–5	2–7	4–5	4–5	5–2	4–5	3–6	8–11	—	2–5	7–12	2–7	9–9
Tampa Bay	1–6	8–11	5–14	2–4	3–3	3–3	6–3	5–4	4–15	2–7	5–2	—	2–7	9–9	15–3
Texas	10–9	2–5	5–4	3–6	8–1	5–4	5–4	2–5	4–5	9–11	12–7	7–2	—	7–2	10–8
Toronto	5–4	8–11	5–14	4–3	2–5	2–4	3–3	2–4	7–12	3–6	7–2	9–9	2–7	—	8–10

Mariners vs. National League
Team	NL West	NL East	NL Central					
Team	SDP	MTL	CHC	CIN	HOU	MIL	PIT	STL
Seattle	1–2	3–0	–	–	1–2	1–2	3–0	0–3

=== Opening Day box score ===
Batting	AB	R	H	RBI	BB	SO	BA
Ichiro Suzuki (RF)	4	1	1	0	1	1	.250
Randy Winn (CF)	5	0	0	0	0	1	.000
Bret Boone (2B)	5	0	0	0	0	2	.000
Raúl Ibañez (LF)	3	1	1	0	1	1	.333
Edgar Martínez (DH)	3	0	1	1	1	2	.000
John Olerud (1B)	4	1	1	0	0	0	.000
Rich Aurilia (SS)	4	0	1	0	0	1	.250
Dan Wilson (C)	4	0	1	0	0	0	.250
Willie Bloomquist (3B)	2	0	1	1	0	1	.500

=== Season summary ===
At the All-Star Break, the Mariners had lost nine straight and were at 32–54 (.372), 17 games behind the division-leading Texas Rangers.

On October 1, Ichiro Suzuki set the major league record for hits, breaking George Sisler's 84-year-old mark with a pair of early singles. It was his 258th hit of the season. Later in the game, Suzuki got another hit, giving him 259 this season and a major league-leading .373 average. Fireworks exploded after Suzuki's big hit reached the outfield, creating a haze over Safeco Field, and his teammates mobbed him at first base. The crowd of 45,573 was the ninth sellout this season. After the record breaking hit, Suzuki ran to the first-base seats, bowed respectfully and then shook hands with Sisler's 81-year-old daughter, Frances Sisler Drochelman, and other members of the Hall of Famer's family. Fans in downtown Tokyo watched Suzuki in sports bars and on big-screen monitors. Sisler set the hits record in 1920 with the St. Louis Browns over a 154-game schedule. Suzuki broke it in the Mariners' 160th game. Suzuki's hit came off Ryan Drese, boosting Suzuki to 10-for-20 lifetime against him. Suzuki's sixth-inning infield single came off John Wasdin. After Suzuki's 258th hit, he scored his 100th run of the season when the Mariners batted around in the third, taking a 6–2 lead on six hits. Suzuki's first-inning single was his 919th hit in the majors, breaking the record for most hits over a four-year span. Bill Terry of the New York Giants set the previous record of 918 hits from 1929 to 1932. Suzuki had 924 hits in his four seasons.

Future Hall of Fame designated hitter Edgar Martínez played his final season with the Mariners.

==== Notable transactions ====
- June 9, 2004: Quinton McCracken was released.
- July 23: John Olerud was released.
- August 6: Bill Pulsipher's contract was purchased by the Mariners from the Long Island Ducks.
- September 13: Pulsipher was released.

=== Draft ===
In the 2004 MLB draft, the Mariners selected Matt Tuiasosopo in the third round with their first selection. Out of the 48 players selected by the Mariners, four who signed with the Mariners played in MLB: Tuiasosopo, Rob Johnson, Mark Lowe, and Michael Saunders.

== 2004 roster ==
2004 Seattle Mariners
Roster
Pitchers: 57 Scott Atchison; 32 Cha Seung Baek; 48 Travis Blackley; 45 Ryan Franklin; 34 Freddy García; 18 Eddie Guardado; 17 Shigetoshi Hasegawa; 32 Kevin Jarvis; 35 Masao Kida; 56 Bobby Madritsch; 40 Julio Mateo; 55 Gil Meche; 50 Jamie Moyer; 53 Mike Myers; 37 Clint Nageotte; 38 Joel Piñeiro; 20 J. J. Putz; 52 George Sherrill; 39 Rafael Soriano; 54 Aaron Taylor; 43 Matt Thornton; 47 Ron Villone; 41 Randy Williams	Catchers: 10 Pat Borders; 13 Ben Davis; 7,8 Miguel Olivo; 59 René Rivera; 6 Dan Wilson; Infielders: 35 Rich Aurilia; 16 Willie Bloomquist; 29 Bret Boone; 12 Jolbert Cabrera; 53 Greg Dobbs; 25 Dave Hansen; 33 Bucky Jacobsen; 26 Justin Leone; 22 José López; 30 Mickey Lopez; 11 Edgar Martínez; 5 John Olerud; 1 Ramón Santiago; 23 Scott Spiezio	Outfielders: 44 Hiram Bocachica; 28 Raúl Ibañez; 9 Quinton McCracken; 58 Jeremy Reed; 51 Ichiro Suzuki; 2 Randy Winn	Manager: 3 Bob Melvin; Coaches: 8 Mike Aldrete (first base); 49 Orlando Gómez (bullpen); 15 Rene Lachemann (bench); 31 Dave Myers (third base); 4 Paul Molitor (hitting); 27 Bryan Price (pitching)

=== Player stats ===
==== Batting ====
===== Starters by position =====
Note: Pos = Position; G = Games played; AB = At bats; H = Hits; Avg. = Batting average; HR = Home runs; RBI = Runs batted in

Pos	Player	G	AB	H	Avg.	HR	RBI
C	Dan Wilson	103	319	80	.251	2	33
1B	John Olerud	78	261	64	.245	5	22
2B	Bret Boone	148	593	149	.251	24	83
SS	Rich Aurilia	73	261	63	.241	4	28
3B	Scott Spiezio	112	367	79	.215	10	41
LF	Raúl Ibañez	123	481	146	.304	16	62
CF	Randy Winn	157	626	179	.286	14	81
RF	Ichiro Suzuki	161	704	262	.372	8	60
DH	Edgar Martínez	141	486	128	.263	12	63

===== Other batters =====
Note: G = Games played; AB = At bats; H = Hits; Avg. = Batting average; HR = Home runs; RBI = Runs batted in

Player	G	AB	H	Avg.	HR	RBI
Jolbert Cabrera	113	359	97	.270	6	47
José López	57	207	48	.232	5	22
Willie Bloomquist	93	188	46	.245	2	18
Bucky Jacobsen	42	160	44	.275	9	28
Miguel Olivo	50	160	32	.200	6	14
Justin Leone	31	102	22	.216	6	13
Hiram Bocachica	50	90	22	..244	3	6
Dave Hansen	57	78	22	.282	2	12
Jeremy Reed	18	58	23	.397	0	5
Greg Dobbs	18	53	12	.226	1	9
Pat Borders	19	53	10	.189	1	5
Ramón Santiago	19	39	7	.179	0	2
Ben Davis	14	33	3	.091	0	2
Quinton McCracken	19	20	3	.150	0	0
Mickey Lopez	6	4	1	.250	0	0
René Rivera	2	3	0	.000	0	0

==== Pitching ====
===== Starting pitchers =====
Note: G = Games pitched; IP = Innings pitched; W = Wins; L = Losses; ERA = Earned run average; SO = Strikeouts

Player	G	IP	W	L	ERA	SO
Jamie Moyer	34	202.0	7	13	5.21	125
Ryan Franklin	32	200.1	4	16	4.90	104
Joel Piñeiro	21	140.2	6	11	4.67	111
Gil Meche	23	127.2	7	7	5.01	99
Freddy García	15	107.0	4	7	3.20	82
Bobby Madritsch	15	88.0	6	3	3.27	60
Travis Blackley	6	26.0	1	3	10.04	16

===== Other pitchers =====
Note: G = Games pitched; IP = Innings pitched; W = Wins; L = Losses; ERA = Earned run average; SO = Strikeouts

Player	G	IP	W	L	ERA	SO
Ron Villone	56	117	8	6	4.08	86
Clint Nageotte	12	36.2	1	6	7.36	24
Cha-Seung Baek	7	31	2	4	5.52	20

===== Relief pitchers =====
Note: G = Games pitched; W = Wins; L = Losses; SV = Saves; ERA = Earned run average; SO = Strikeouts

Player	G	W	L	SV	ERA	SO
Eddie Guardado	41	2	2	18	2.78	45
Shigetoshi Hasegawa	68	4	6	0	5.16	46
J.J. Putz	54	0	3	9	4.71	47
Mike Myers	50	4	1	0	4.88	23
Julio Mateo	45	1	2	1	4.68	43
Scott Atchison	25	2	3	0	3.52	36
George Sherrill	21	2	1	0	3.80	16
Matt Thornton	19	1	2	0	4.13	30
Kevin Jarvis	8	1	0	0	8.31	7
Masao Kida	7	0	0	0	8.38	5
Randy Williams	6	0	0	0	5.79	4
Rafael Soriano	6	0	3	0	13.50	3
Aaron Taylor	5	0	0	0	9.82	4

== Awards and honors ==
Designated hitter Edgar Martínez won the Roberto Clemente Award.

Right fielder Ichiro Suzuki was the team's lone All-Star and set the MLB single-season hits record. He won the American League (AL) Player of the Month Award for August and won a Gold Glove Award and the AL batting crown, batting a career-high .372.

== Farm system ==
Level	Team	League	Manager
AAA	Tacoma Rainiers	Pacific Coast League	Dan Rohn
AA	San Antonio Missions	Texas League	Dave Brundage
A	Inland Empire 66ers	California League	Steve Roadcap
A	Wisconsin Timber Rattlers	Midwest League	Daren Brown
A-Short Season	Everett AquaSox	Northwest League	Pedro Grifol
Rookie	AZL Mariners	Arizona League	Scott Steinmann

== Major League Baseball draft ==
2004 Seattle Mariners draft picks
Information
Owner	Nintendo of America
General Manager(s)	Bill Bavasi
Manager(s)	Bob Melvin
First pick	Matt Tuiasosopo
Draft positions	N/A
Number of selections	48
Links
Results	Baseball-Reference
Official Site	The Official Site of the Seattle Mariners
Years	2003 • 2004 • 2005

The following is a list of 2004 Seattle Mariners draft picks. The Mariners took part in the June regular draft, also known as the Rule 4 draft. The Mariners made 48 selections in the 2004 draft, the first being shortstop Matt Tuiasosopo in the third round. In all, the Mariners selected 18 pitchers, 13 outfielders, 6 catchers, 6 shortstops, 3 first basemen, 1 third baseman, and 1 second baseman.

=== Draft ===
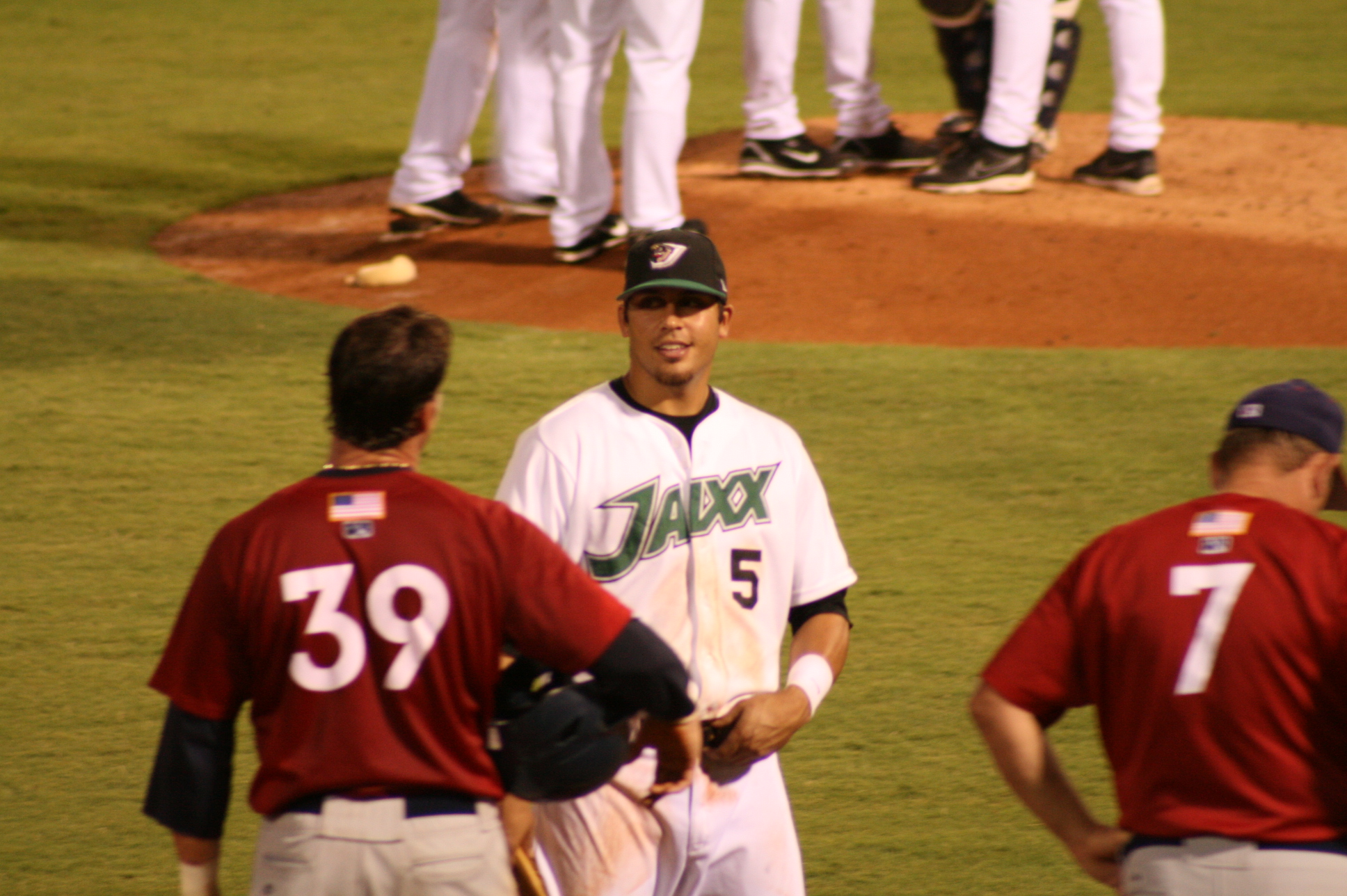
Matt Tuiasosopo (center) was the Mariners' first selection in the 2004 draft.

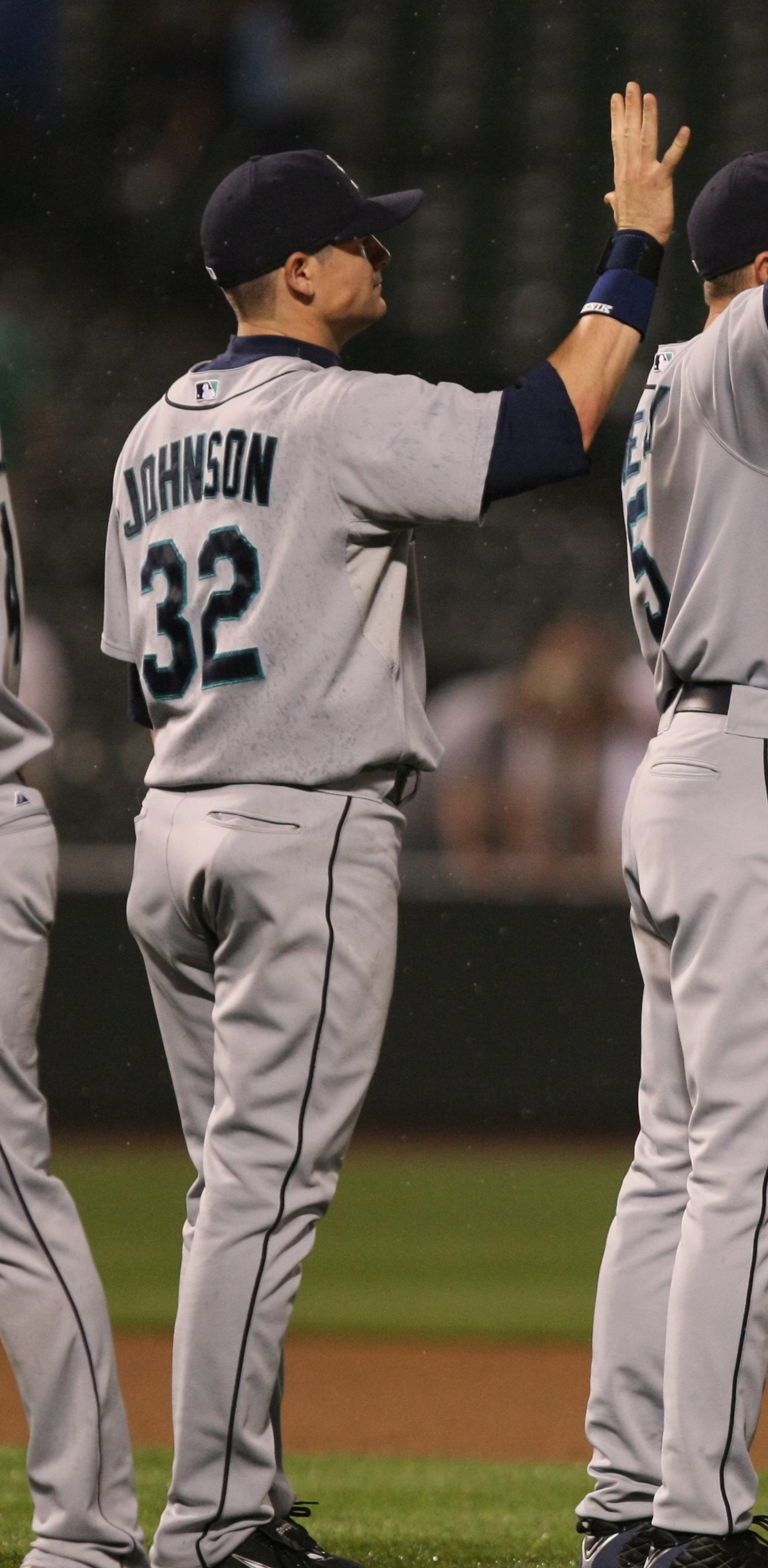
Rob Johnson was selected by the Mariners in the fourth round.

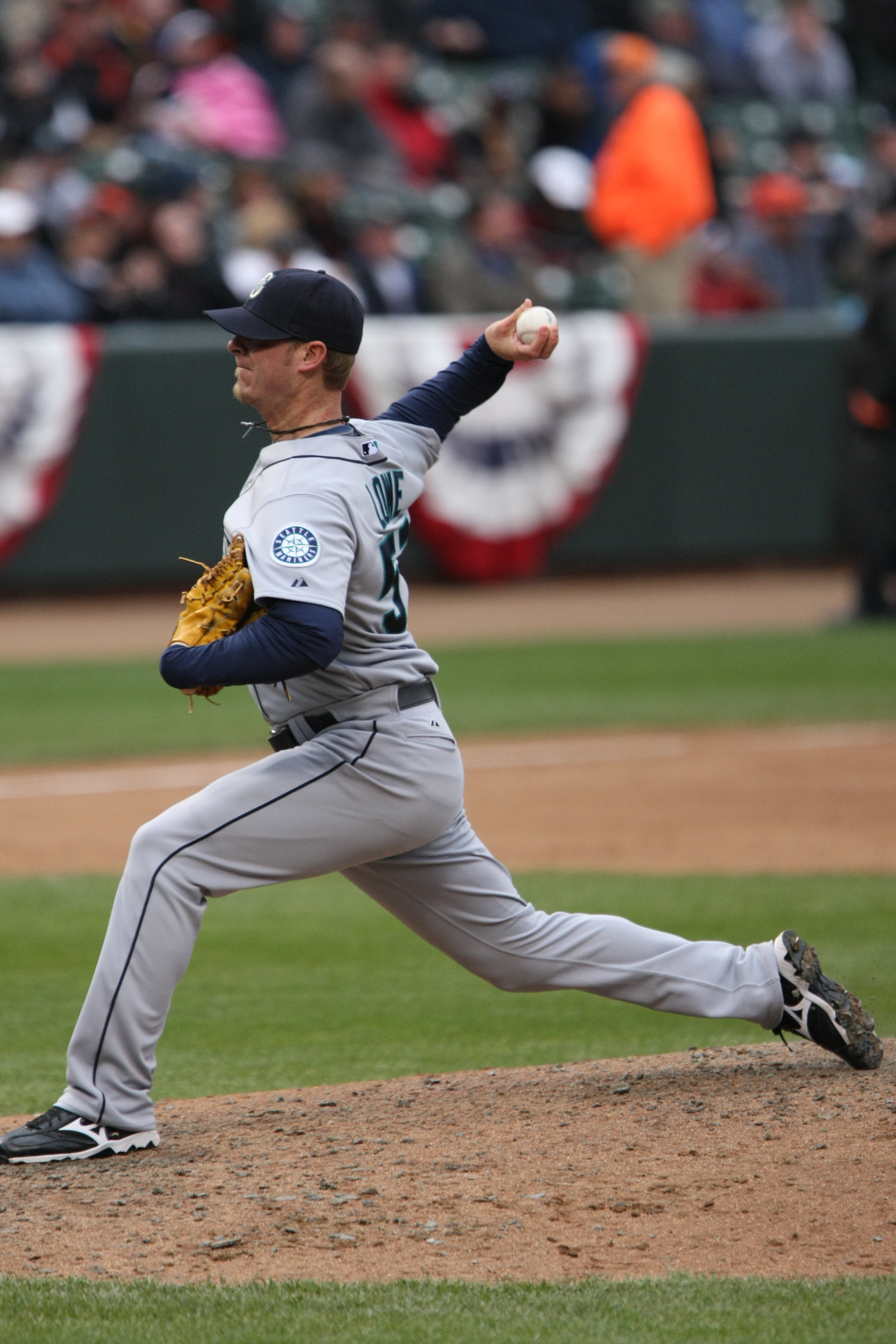
In the fifth round the Mariners selected Mark Lowe.

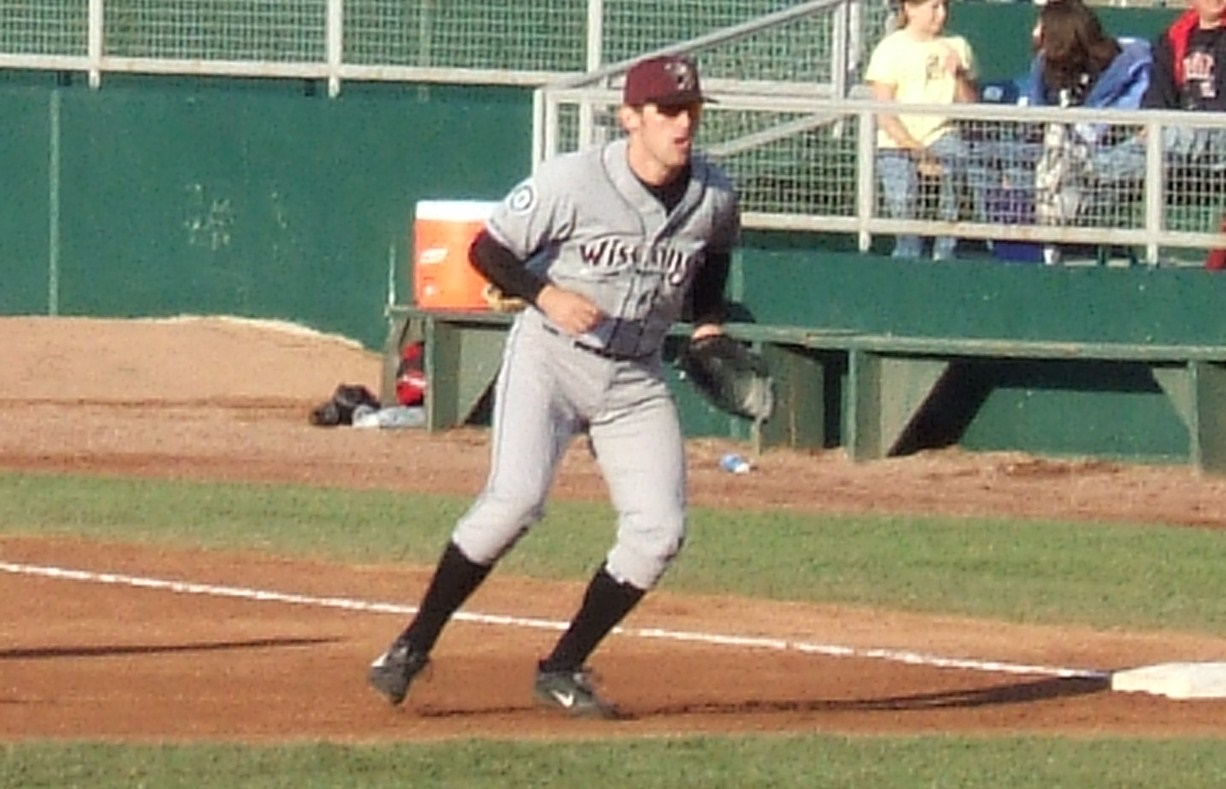
Marshall Hubbard was selected by the Mariners in the eight round.

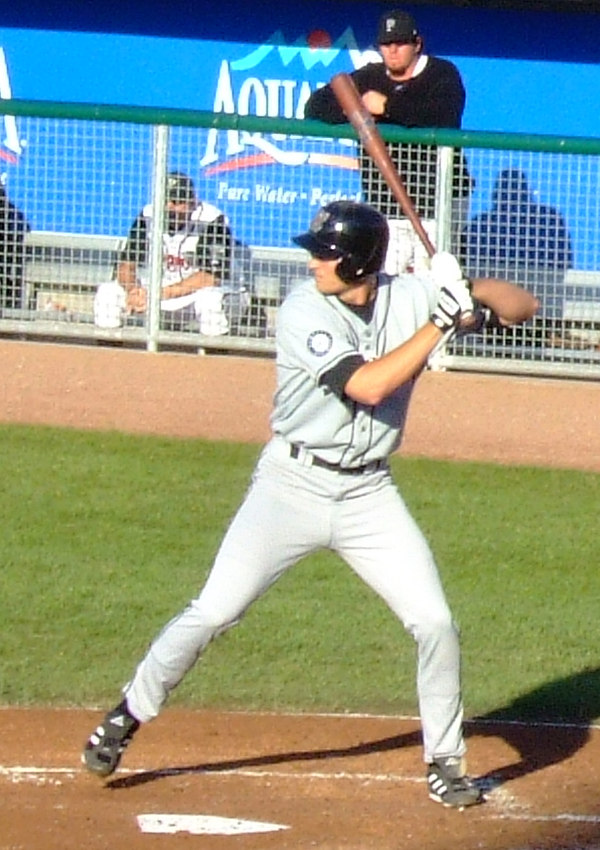
With the 333rd pick in the 2004 draft, the Mariners selected Michael Saunders.

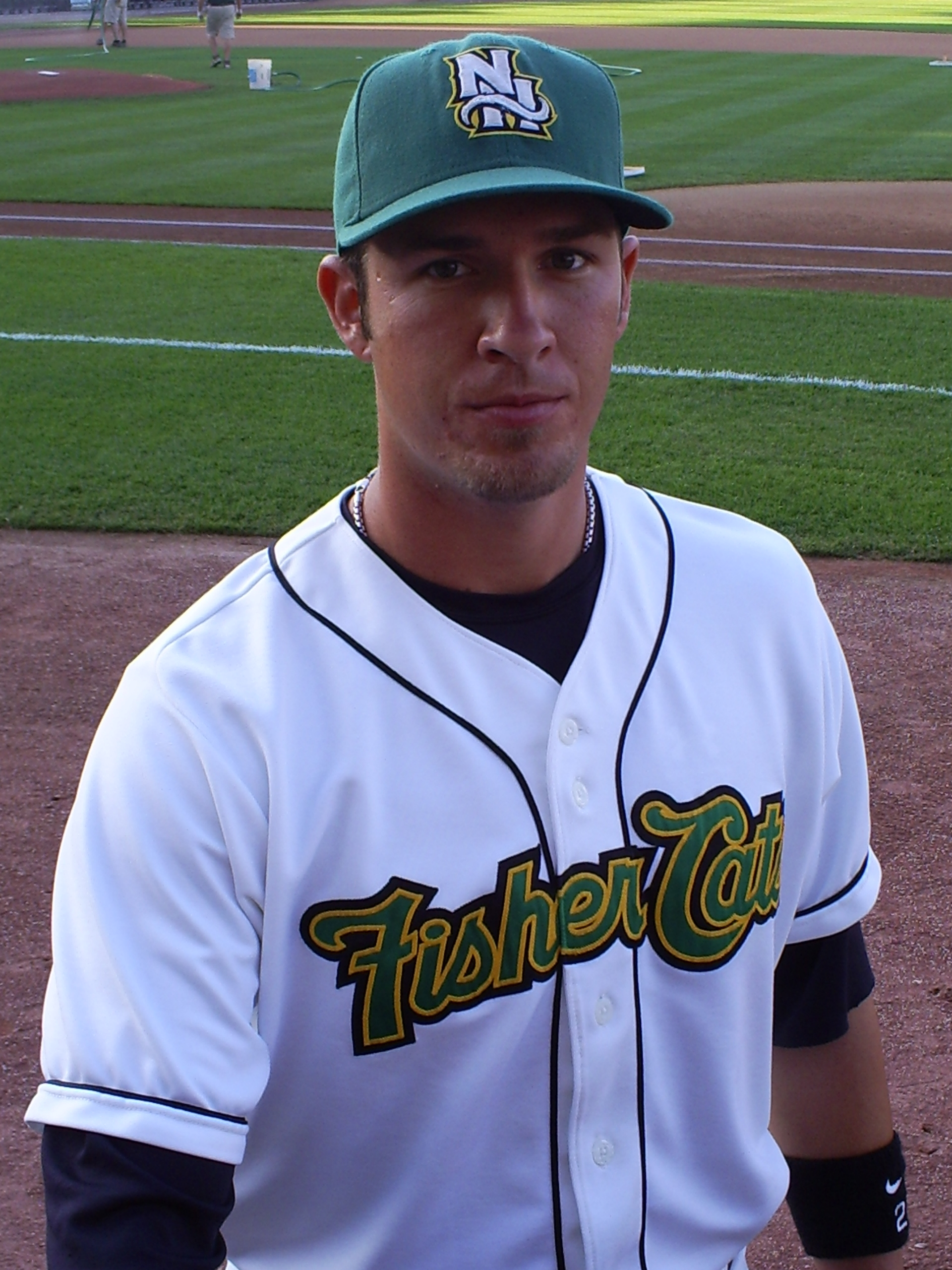
J. P. Arencibia was the 513th pick in the 2004 draft but did not sign with Seattle.

=== Key ===
Round (Pick)	Indicates the round and pick the player was drafted
Position	Indicates the secondary/collegiate position at which the player was drafted, rather than the professional position the player may have gone on to play
**Bold**	Indicates the player signed with the Mariners
Italics	Indicates the player did not sign with the Mariners
	Indicates the player made an appearance in Major League Baseball

=== Table ===
Round (Pick)	Name	Position	School	Ref.
3 (93)	**Matt Tuiasosopo**	Shortstop	Woodinville High School	
4 (123)	**Rob Johnson**	Catcher	University of Houston	
5 (153)	**Mark Lowe**	Right-handed pitcher	University of Texas at Arlington	
6 (183)	**Jermaine Brock**	Outfielder	Ottawa Hills High School	
7 (213)	**Sebastien Boucher**	Outfielder	Bethune–Cookman University	
8 (243)	**Marshall Hubbard**	First baseman	University of North Carolina at Asheville	
9 (273)	**Jeffrey Dominguez**	Shortstop	Puerto Rico Baseball Academy and High School	
10 (303)	**Eric Carter**	Right-handed pitcher	Delaware State University	
11 (333)	**Michael Saunders**	Outfielder	Lambrick Park Secondary School	
12 (363)	**Steven Uhlmansiek**	Left-handed pitcher	Wichita State University	
13 (393)	**Kristopher Kasarjian**	Outfielder	Los Angeles Pierce College	
14 (423)	**Brent Johnson**	Outfielder	University of Nevada, Las Vegas	
15 (453)	Brent Thomas	Outfielder	Bellevue Community College	
16 (483)	**Chad Fillinger**	Right-handed pitcher	Santa Clara University	
17 (513)	J. P. Arencibia	Catcher	Westminster Christian School	
18 (543)	**Jack Arroyo**	Second baseman	California State University, San Bernardino	
19 (573)	**Brandon Green**	Shortstop	Wichita State University	
20 (603)	Brian Chavez	Shortstop	Quartz Hill High School	
21 (633)	**Mumba Rivera**	Right-handed pitcher	Bethune–Cookman University	
22 (663)	**David Hall**	Outfielder	San Diego State University	
23 (693)	**John Summerhayes**	First baseman	Stanford University	
24 (723)	**Gregory Slee**	Catcher	Huntington College	
25 (753)	**Jonathan Jacobitz**	Catcher	University of San Francisco	
26 (783)	Zachary Ashwood	Left-handed pitcher	The Colony High School	
27 (813)	**Aaron Trolia**	Right-handed pitcher	Washington State University	
28 (843)	**Adam Brandt**	Left-handed pitcher	Otterbein College	
29 (873)	**Michael Ciccotelli**	Left-handed pitcher	Villanova University	
30 (903)	**Rollie Gibson**	Left-handed pitcher	Fresno City College	
31 (933)	Chad Rothford	First baseman	Fresno City College	
32 (963)	**Donald Clement**	Right-handed pitcher	Colorado State University–Pueblo	
33 (993)	**Marquise Liverpool**	Outfielder	Don Bosco Preparatory High School	
34 (1023)	Duke Welker	Right-handed pitcher	Woodinville High School	
35 (1053)	**Brandon Javis**	Shortstop	Cross Creek High School	
36 (1083)	Nick Hagadone	Left-handed pitcher	Sumner High School	
37 (1113)	James Russell	Left-handed pitcher	Colleyville Heritage High School	
38 (1143)	**Harold Williams**	Left-handed pitcher	Mt. San Jacinto College	
39 (1173)	Jacob Opitz	Shortstop	Heritage High School	
40 (1203)	**Michael Schilling**	Right-handed pitcher	Fresno City College	
41 (1233)	Garrett Parcell	Right-handed pitcher	Norco High School	
42 (1262)	**Erwin Jacobo**	Third baseman	Braddock High School	
43 (1291)	Luis Coste	Outfielder	Puerto Rico Baseball Academy and High School	
44 (1320)	**Felix Martinez**	Outfielder	Broward College	
45 (1349)	**Gordon Lynah**	Outfielder	Spartanburg Methodist College	
46 (1379)	**Daniel Martin**	Outfielder	Indian River Community College	
47 (1407)	**Andrew Mcdonald**	Catcher	Sahuaro High School	
48 (1435)	**Zachary Walden**	Catcher	Stockbridge High School	
49 (1463)	Andrew Reichard	Right-handed pitcher	Seminole Community College	
50 (1491)	**Leighton Autrey**	Outfielder	Navarro College	
