= Arnie Muñoz =

Dominican baseball player (born 1982)

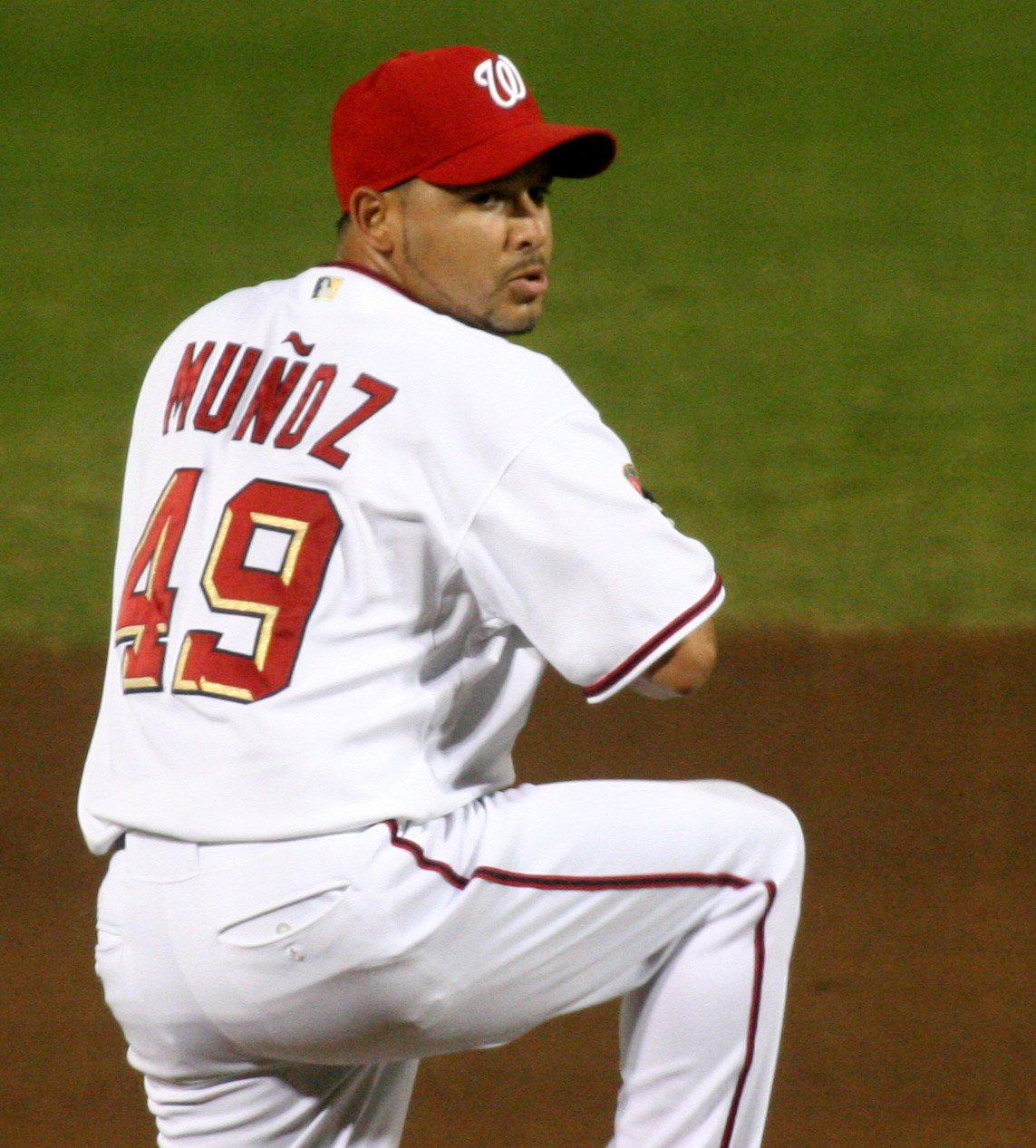
- Muñoz with the Washington Nationals in 2007
- Pitcher
- Born: June 21, 1982 (age 44); Mao, Dominican Republic
- Batted: Left Threw: Left

MLB debut
- June 19, 2004, for the Chicago White Sox

Last MLB appearance
- September 28, 2007, for the Washington Nationals

MLB statistics
- Win–loss record: 0–1
- Earned run average: 9.15
- Strikeouts: 14
- Stats at Baseball Reference

Teams
- Chicago White Sox (2004); Washington Nationals (2007)

Arnaldo Rafel "Arnie" Muñoz (born June 21, 1982) is a Dominican former professional baseball pitcher. Muñoz batted and threw left-handed.

== Career ==
Muñoz made his major league debut in 2004 for the Chicago White Sox in a start against the Montreal Expos. It was a disaster, as Muñoz allowed eleven runs in three innings (including nine in the second inning alone), tying for third all-time for most runs allowed in a major league debut. By game score, it was the worst debut start since earned runs became official in 1913. Muñoz went back to the minors, then returned in September, pitching fairly well in relief.

=== 2007 ===
Muñoz's contract was purchased by the Washington Nationals in September 2007. Muñoz became the Nationals' left-handed specialist after the team traded Ray King to the Milwaukee Brewers.

=== 2008–present ===
Before the start of the season, it was not certain whom the Nationals would use as their left-handed specialist. Although neither was on the 40-man roster, both Muñoz and Ray King were invited to spring training. However, Muñoz was assigned to the Double-A Harrisburg Senators of the Eastern League at the end of the preseason. He became a free agent at the end of the season; he did not play in 2009.

In 2010, Muñoz pitched for Petroleros de Minatitlan of the Mexican League, compiling a 1–2 record and a 2.77 ERA, in what was his last year as a professional ballplayer.
