= Félix Díaz (baseball) =

Dominican baseball player (born 1980)

- Pitcher
- Born: July 27, 1980 (age 46); Las Matas de Farfán, Dominican Republic
- Batted: Right Threw: Right

Professional debut
- MLB: May 13, 2004, for the Chicago White Sox
- NPB: March 28, 2006, for the Hokkaido Nippon Ham Fighters
- KBO: June 15, 2008, for the Kia Tigers

Last appearance
- MLB: September 24, 2004, for the Chicago White Sox
- NPB: July 17, 2006, for the Hokkaido Nippon Ham Fighters
- KBO: September 3, 2008, for the Kia Tigers

MLB statistics
- Win–loss record: 2–5
- Earned run average: 6.75
- Strikeouts: 33

NPB statistics
- Win–loss record: 3–5
- Earned run average: 4.91
- Strikeouts: 22

KBO statistics
- Win–loss record: 0–2
- Earned run average: 2.98
- Strikeouts: 23
- Stats at Baseball Reference

Teams
- Chicago White Sox (2004); Hokkaido Nippon Ham Fighters (2006); Kia Tigers (2008)

Félix Antonio Díaz (born July 27, 1980) is a Dominican former pitcher in Major League Baseball who played for the Chicago White Sox in the 2004 season. Díaz bats and throws right-handed.

== Career ==
In one major league season, Díaz posted a 2–5 record with 33 strikeouts and a 6.75 ERA in 18 games pitched (seven as a starter). Díaz also played in Japan with the Hokkaido Nippon Ham Fighters of the Pacific League in 2006, but he was dismissed after a dismal start.

In November 2006, Díaz signed with the Washington Nationals a minor league deal. In late July 2007, he was released and a few days later signed a minor league contract with the Boston Red Sox. He signed with the Kia Tigers in 2008. In 2010, Diaz played for the Tecolotes de Nuevo Laredo of the Mexican League.
