= Mike Rose (baseball) =

American baseball player (born 1976)

- Catcher
- Born: August 25, 1976 (age 50); Sacramento, California, U.S.
- Batted: Switch Threw: Right

MLB debut
- October 1, 2004, for the Oakland Athletics

Last MLB appearance
- October 1, 2006, for the St. Louis Cardinals

MLB statistics
- Batting average: .204
- Home runs: 1
- Runs batted in: 2
- Stats at Baseball Reference

Teams
- Oakland Athletics (2004); Los Angeles Dodgers (2005); St. Louis Cardinals (2006)

Michael John-Ferrero Rose (born August 25, 1976) is an American former Major League Baseball catcher.

Drafted by the Houston Astros in the 5th round of the 1995 baseball draft Mike went on to play 15 professional seasons including Major League call ups with the A's, Cardinals and Dodgers. Mike was part of 3 minor league All Star teams, and 4 minor league championships. Rose compiled 4,629 plate appearances 3,968 at bats over 1,000 career hits, 504 RBI and over 1,400 games played. Mike is now a full time father, coach and professional advisor.
