= Steve Colyer =

American baseball player (born 1979)

- Pitcher
- Born: February 22, 1979 (age 47); St. Louis, Missouri, U.S.
- Batted: Left Threw: Left

MLB debut
- April 3, 2003, for the Los Angeles Dodgers

Last MLB appearance
- May 5, 2007, for the Atlanta Braves

MLB statistics
- Win–loss record: 1–1
- Earned run average: 5.04
- Strikeouts: 51
- Stats at Baseball Reference

Former teams
- Los Angeles Dodgers (2003); Detroit Tigers (2004); Atlanta Braves (2007)

Steven Edward Colyer (born February 22, 1979) is an American former professional baseball relief pitcher. He played in Major League Baseball (MLB) for the Los Angeles Dodgers, Detroit Tigers, and Atlanta Braves. He attended Meramec Community College and was drafted in the 2nd round of the 1997 Major League Baseball draft by the Dodgers.
