= Jeff Bajenaru =

American baseball player (born 1978)

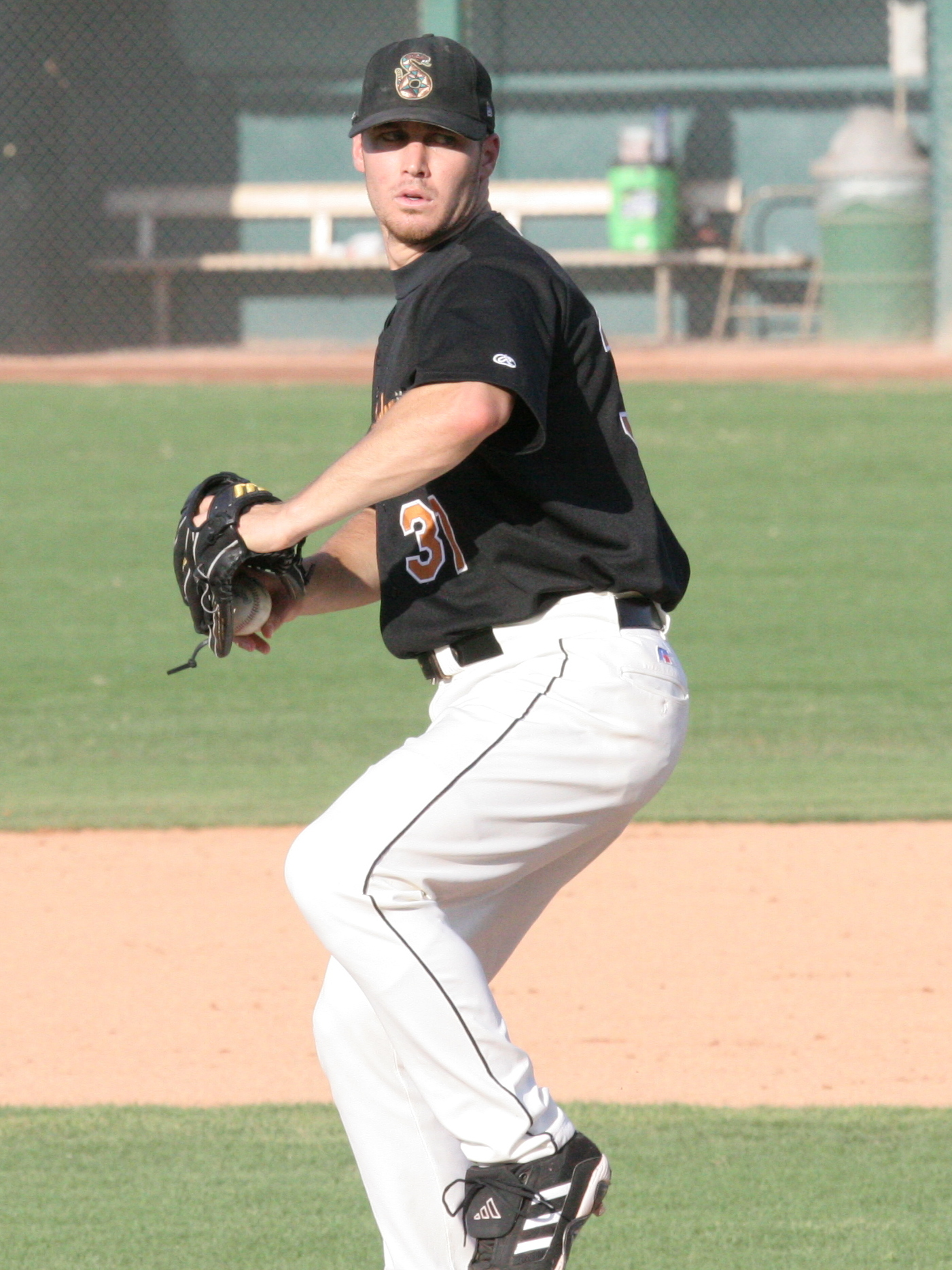
- Jeff Bajenaru with Tucson Sidewinders in 2006
- Pitcher
- Born: March 21, 1978 (age 48); Pomona, California, U.S.
- Batted: Right Threw: Right

MLB debut
- September 4, 2004, for the Chicago White Sox

Last MLB appearance
- August 7, 2006, for the Arizona Diamondbacks

MLB statistics
- Win–loss record: 0–2
- Earned run average: 11.20
- Strikeouts: 11
- Stats at Baseball Reference

Teams
- Chicago White Sox (2004–2005); Arizona Diamondbacks (2006)

Jeffrey Michael Bajenaru (Romanian: Băjenaru; born March 21, 1978) is an American former professional baseball pitcher and current pitching coach for the Hillsboro Hops, the Single-A affiliate of the Arizona Diamondbacks. He played in Major League Baseball (MLB) for the Chicago White Sox and the Arizona Diamondbacks.

== College career ==
Bajenaru was born in Pomona, California and graduated from Ruben S. Ayala High School in Chino Hills. He began his college career at U.C. Riverside and then transferred to Riverside Community College. The Oakland Athletics drafted him in the 13th round after his sophomore season, but he elected not to sign. He parlayed his community college performance into a scholarship at the University of Oklahoma. The Chicago White Sox chose him in the 36th round the next year, but he again returned to school. In 2000, he hit .342 with 11 HR's and 58 RBI. On the mound he was 1–2 with 20 saves (setting a conference and Oklahoma record for season and career and was 2nd in the nation in saves) and a 2.62 ERA. He was a 1st Team All-American as a utility player, and was a 1st Team Big 12 Conference selection as an outfielder and 2nd Team Big 12 Conference selection as a relief pitcher.

Bajenaru was inducted into the Riverside Community College Hall of Fame in 2015.

== Professional career ==
=== Chicago White Sox ===
Bajenaru was projected to be taken between the second and fifth rounds of the 2000 draft by Baseball America, but signed with the Chicago White Sox as a non-drafted free agent in May, before the draft was held.

Bajenaru generally worked as a closer during his minor league career, striking out more than 10 batters per nine innings, and collecting 24 wins and 91 saves in relief. He missed the entire 2002 season as a result of Tommy John surgery, but recovered well and was able to resume his baseball career in 2003.

Bajenaru made his major league debut with the White Sox on September 4, 2004. He enjoyed brief stints in their bullpen in 2004 and 2005.

Bajenaru appeared in four games for the Chicago White Sox team that went on to win the 2005 World Series championship.

=== Arizona Diamondbacks ===
On March 8, 2006, Bajenaru was traded to the Arizona Diamondbacks in exchange for Alex Cintrón. He was with the Triple-A and Pacific Coast League champion Tucson Sidewinders in 2006.

Bajenaru missed the entire 2007 season and ended up retiring from professional baseball in 2008 due to two separate shoulder surgeries. He finished his minor league career with 340 innings, 10.22 K/9, and only 6.9 H/9. In his five full Minor League seasons, he participated in three All-Star games at the Double-A and Triple-A levels.

== Coaching career ==
Since retiring from playing he has been a pitching coach within the Arizona Diamondbacks organization since the 2011 season and was named back-to-back California League Coach of the Year in the 2017 and 2018 seasons.

In February 2019, Bajenaru was named as the pitching coach for the Reno Aces, Arizona's Triple-A affiliate.
