= Jon Adkins =

American baseball player (born 1977)

- Pitcher
- Born: August 30, 1977 (age 48); Huntington, West Virginia, U.S.
- Batted: Left Threw: Right

Professional debut
- MLB: August 14, 2003, for the Chicago White Sox
- KBO: April 4, 2009, for the Lotte Giants

Last appearance
- MLB: September 27, 2008, for the Cincinnati Reds
- KBO: September 22, 2009, for the Lotte Giants

MLB statistics
- Win–loss record: 5–5
- Earned run average: 4.54
- Strikeouts: 81

KBO statistics
- Win–loss record: 3–5
- Earned run average: 3.83
- Strikeouts: 29
- Stats at Baseball Reference

Teams
- Chicago White Sox (2003–2005); San Diego Padres (2006); New York Mets (2007); Cincinnati Reds (2008); Lotte Giants (2009)

Jonathan Scott Adkins (born August 30, 1977) is an American former professional baseball pitcher. He played in Major League Baseball (MLB) for the Chicago White Sox, San Diego Padres, New York Mets, and Cincinnati Reds from 2003 to 2008, and an MLB scout for the Los Angeles Dodgers.

== Playing career ==
=== Amateur ===
Adkins graduated from Oklahoma State University. In 1996, he played collegiate summer baseball with the Orleans Cardinals of the Cape Cod Baseball League. He was drafted by the Oakland Athletics in the ninth round of the 1998 Major League Baseball draft.

=== Professional ===
In April 2006, he pitched in three games for the San Diego Padres, and was then optioned to the Padres' Triple-A affiliate, the Portland Beavers. On November 15, 2006, Adkins was traded to the New York Mets along with Ben Johnson for Heath Bell and Royce Ring. On July 28, 2007, he was called up from the minor leagues. On December 6, 2007, the Cincinnati Reds signed Adkins to a minor league contract.

With the Triple-A Louisville, Adkins served as their closer and saved 30 games (IL leader) with a 3.48 ERA. On September 9, Adkins was recalled, and pitched 1/3 of an inning and got the win. He was released in January to pitch for the Lotte Giants in the Korea Baseball Organization. He led the KBO in saves with 26 in 2009. On December 2, 2009, he signed a minor league deal with the Cincinnati Reds. On July 11, 2010, Cincinnati released Adkins. On July 29, 2010, Adkins signed with the Chicago White Sox and was assigned to Triple-A Charlotte.

== Scouting career ==
Adkins was released by the White Sox in September 2010 and named to the amateur scouting staff of the Boston Red Sox covering the Ohio River Valley in January 2011. After spending five years with Boston, he was named Northeast scouting cross-checker by the Dodgers for 2016.
