= John Ennis (baseball) =

American baseball player (born 1979)

- Pitcher
- Born: October 17, 1979 (age 45); Montrose, Colorado, U.S.
- Batted: Right Threw: Right

Professional debut
- MLB: April 10, 2002, for the Atlanta Braves
- KBO: August 28, 2008, for the Samsung Lions

Last appearance
- MLB: September 12, 2007, for the Philadelphia Phillies
- KBO: October 17, 2008, for the Samsung Lions

MLB statistics
- Win–loss record: 0–0
- Earned run average: 7.81
- Strikeouts: 22

KBO statistics
- Win–loss record: 1–3
- Earned run average: 3.03
- Strikeouts: 20
- Stats at Baseball Reference

Teams
- Atlanta Braves (2002); Detroit Tigers (2004); Philadelphia Phillies (2007); Samsung Lions (2008)

John Wayne Ennis (born October 17, 1979) is an American former professional baseball right-handed relief pitcher. Ennis made his Major League Baseball (MLB) debut on April 10, 2002, with the Atlanta Braves.

Ennis pitched 4 innings in his first MLB game; however, that one appearance was his only appearance for the Braves. He pitched 16 innings in 12 appearances for the Detroit Tigers in 2004, posting an 8.44 ERA. Ennis made his Philadelphia Phillies debut on August 26, 2007, pitching three innings and getting his first career save. He was designated for assignment by the Phillies on February 26, 2008. On August 6, 2008, Ennis' contract was sold to the Samsung Lions of the Korea Baseball Organization (KBO), where he pitched for the rest of the season.

On February 25, 2009, Ennis signed with the Lancaster Barnstormers of the independent Atlantic League, but on March 3, signed a minor league contract with the Philadelphia Phillies.

After pitching in the first game of the season, Ennis suffered an injury to his elbow and was told he needed Tommy John surgery which would end his season. The Phillies released him on November 10, 2009.
