= 2004 Boston Red Sox season =

Major League Baseball season

2004 Boston Red Sox
- World Series champions American League champions American League Wild Card winners
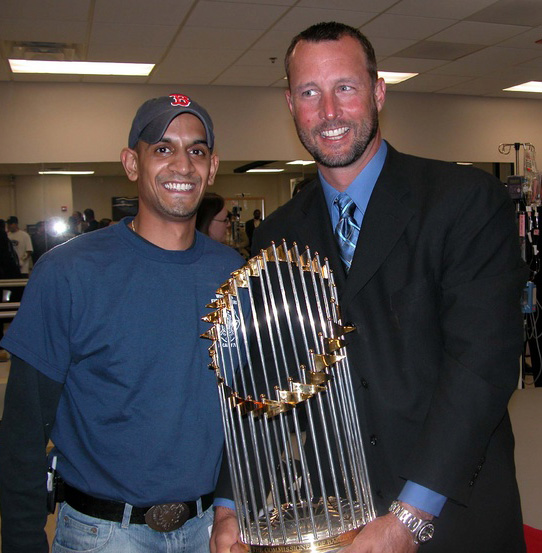
- Tim Wakefield (right) with the Commissioner's Trophy
- League: American League
- Division: East
- Ballpark: Fenway Park
- City: Boston
- Record: 98–64 (.605)
- Divisional place: 2nd
- Owners: John W. Henry (New England Sports Ventures)
- President: Larry Lucchino
- General manager: Theo Epstein
- Manager: Terry Francona
- Television: WSBK-TV; WBZ-TV (Sean McDonough, Jerry Remy); NESN (Don Orsillo, Jerry Remy)
- Radio: WEEI (Jerry Trupiano, Joe Castiglione); WROL (Bill Kulik, Uri Berenguer, Juan Pedro Villamán)
- Stats: ESPN.com; Baseball Reference

The 2004 Boston Red Sox season was the 104th season in the franchise's Major League Baseball history. Managed by Terry Francona, the Red Sox finished with a 98–64 record, three games behind the New York Yankees in the American League East. The Red Sox qualified for the postseason as the AL wild card, swept the Anaheim Angels in the ALDS, and faced the Yankees in the ALCS for the second straight year. After losing the first three games and trailing in the ninth inning of the fourth game, the Red Sox became the first team in major league history to come back from a 3–0 postseason deficit, defeating the Yankees in seven games. The Red Sox then swept the St. Louis Cardinals in the World Series, capturing their first championship since 1918.

The Red Sox had a strong offense in the regular season, leading the major leagues in runs scored (949), doubles (373), on-base percentage (.360), slugging percentage (.472), on-base plus slugging (.832), total bases (2,702), batting average on balls in play, and plate appearances. They led all postseason teams in batting average and on-base percentage.

== Offseason ==
- October 27, 2003: The Red Sox declared that they will not exercise the club option for manager Grady Little or offer him a multi-year deal; ending Little's run as manager of the Red Sox.
- November 7, 2003: The Red Sox exercised its 2004 option on Derek Lowe.
- November 20, 2003: The Red Sox purchased the contracts of Jerome Gamble from Portland, as well as Andy Dominique and Kevin Youkilis from Pawtucket; signed Tim Hamulack; claimed Edwin Almonte and Phil Siebel off waivers from the Mets; sent César Crespo outright to Pawtucket.
- November 28, 2003: The Red Sox traded Casey Fossum, Brandon Lyon, Jorge de la Rosa, and Michael Goss to the Arizona Diamondbacks for Curt Schilling; The Red Sox gave Schilling a two-year contract extension.
- December 8, 2003: The Red Sox signed David McCarty to a minor-league contract and claimed Mark Malaska off of waivers from the Rays.
- December 9, 2003: The Red Sox signed Luis Soto to a minor league contract.
- December 13, 2003: The Red Sox signed Keith Foulke to a three-year, $20.75 million contract with an option for a fourth year.
- December 15, 2003: The Red Sox assigned Michael Goss to the Diamondbacks to complete the trade for Curt Schilling.
- December 16, 2003: The Red Sox acquired Mark Bellhorn from Colorado for a player to be named later.
- December 20, 2003: The Red Sox signed Doug Mirabelli to a one-year contract. The Red Sox offered contracts to Trot Nixon, David Ortiz, Byung Hyun Kim, and Scott Williamson. The team did not offer contracts to Gabe Kapler, Lou Merloni, Damian Jackson, Scott Sauerbeck, Jason Shiell, and Edwin Almonte. The Red Sox also tendered contracts to Kevin Youkilis, Andy Dominique, Bronson Arroyo, Jamie Brown, Jerome Gamble, Colter Bean, Lenny DiNardo, Anastacio Martínez, Bryan Hebson, Mark Malaska, and Phil Seibel.
- December 22, 2003: Gabe Kapler signed a one-year, $750,000 contract with the Red Sox. The Red Sox also signed Jason Shiell and Edwin Almonte.
- December 23, 2003: The Red Sox signed free agent Pokey Reese to a base salary of $800,000 with a $200,000 signing bonus and a potential $600,000 performance bonus. The Red Sox also officially announced that they had signed Edwin Almonte to a minor-league contract and signed Jason Shiell to a split deal contract that would pay him $303,000.
- January 7, 2004: The Red Sox formally signed Brian Daubach to a minor league contract.

=== A new manager ===
Following the team's exit from the postseason by the New York Yankees in Game 7 of the American League Championship Series, Red Sox manager Grady Little was fired from his position on October 27, one business day after the 2003 World Series. Little, who had a 188–136 record managing the Red Sox, received a $250,000 parting gift as well as $60,000 in performance bonuses.

After a month of searching, the Red Sox hired former Philadelphia manager Terry Francona on December 4, 2003. Other candidates for consideration included Anaheim bench coach Joe Maddon, Texas first base coach DeMarlo Hale, and Los Angeles third base coach Glenn Hoffman. The Red Sox gave Francona a three-year deal with an option for a fourth.

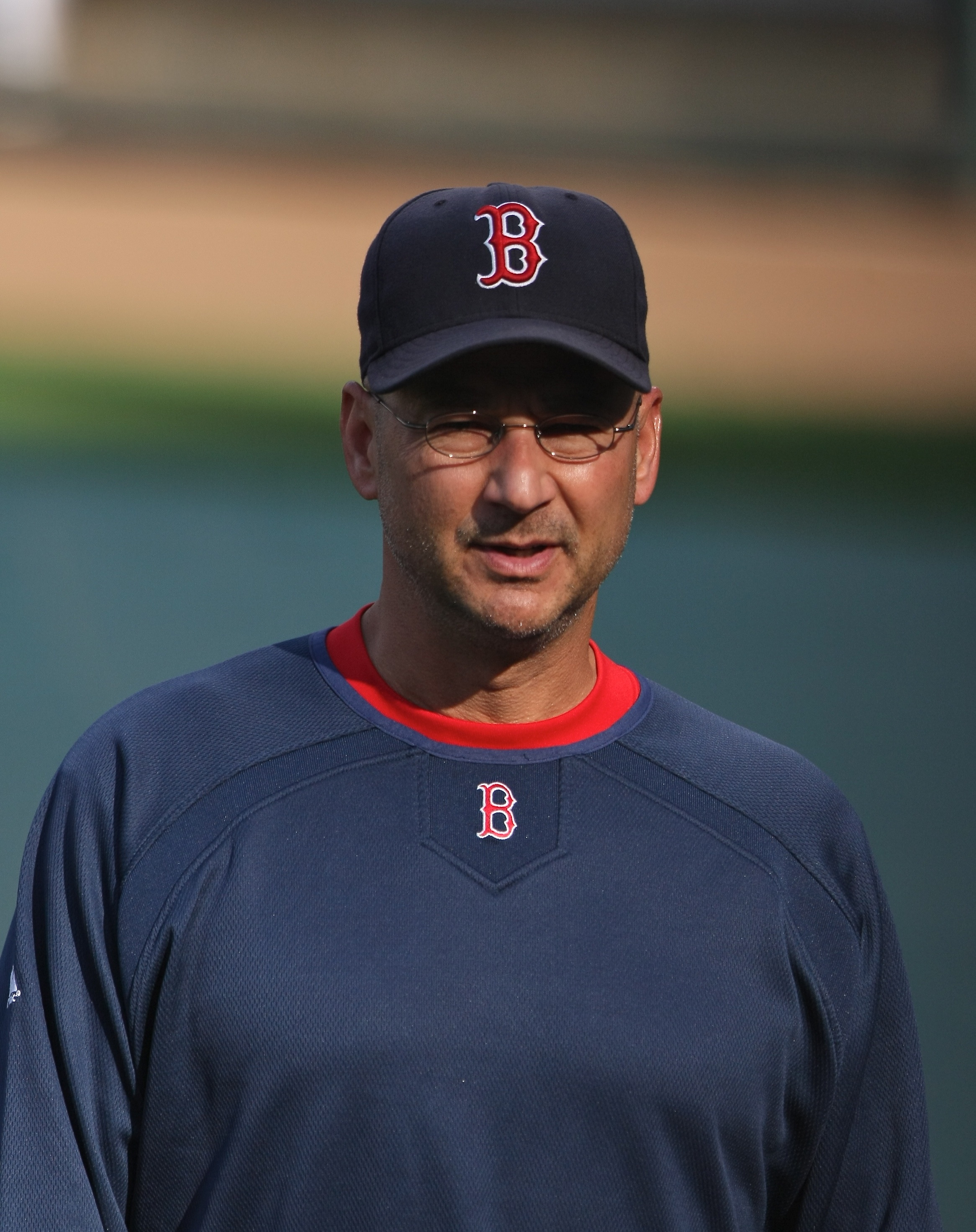
Terry Francona

=== Pre-season events ===
During the 2003–04 off season, the Red Sox acquired an ace starting pitcher, Curt Schilling, as well as a closer, Keith Foulke. Many visitors at their spring training at Fort Myers, Florida, were very enthusiastic about the 2004 Red Sox team. Expectations once again ran high that 2004 would finally be the year that the Red Sox ended their championship drought.

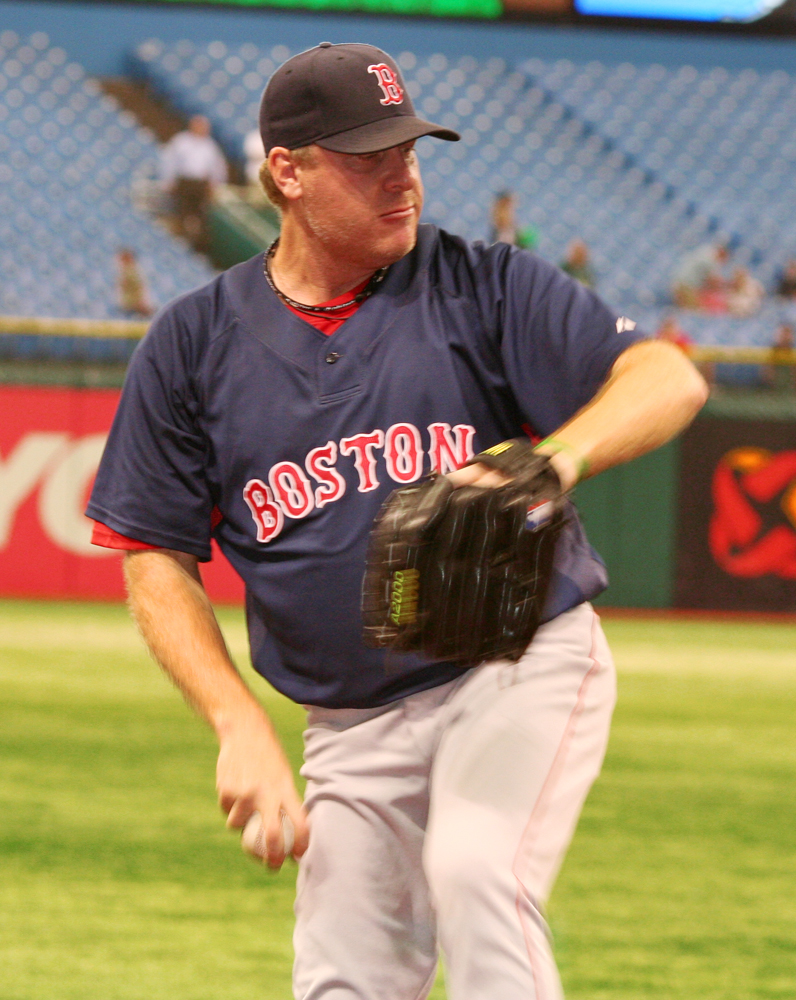
Curt Schilling

== Spring training ==
Red Sox Win	Red Sox Loss	Tie Game

2004 Boston Red Sox Spring Training Log
March

#	Date	Opponent	Score	Win	Loss	Save	Record	Source
1	March 4	Minnesota Twins	5─3	Colter Bean	Kevin Tolar	─	1─0	
2	March 6	Minnesota Twins	6─2	Pete Munro	Colter Bean	─	1─1	
3	March 7	New York Yankees	11─7	Mariano Rivera	Jason Shiell	─	1─2	
4	March 8	Minnesota Twins	9─4	Edwin Almonte	Kevin Tolar	─	2─2	
5	March 8	Philadelphia Phillies	5─3	Colter Bean	Bud Smith	─	3─2	
6	March 9	Cincinnati Reds	3─2	Ryan Wagner	Scott Williamson	Brian Reith	3─3	
7	March 10	St. Louis Cardinals	4─3	Jason Shiell	Josh Pearce	Anastacio Martinez	4─3	
8	March 11	Baltimore Orioles	10─8	Rodrigo Lopez	Bronson Arroyo	Aaron Rakers	4─4	
9	March 12	Los Angeles Dodgers	5─1	Tim Wakefield	Hideo Nomo	─	5─4	
10	March 13	Toronto Blue Jays	7─1	Derek Lowe	Josh Towers	─	6─4	
11	March 14	Baltimore Orioles	5─2	Mike Timlin	Sidney Ponson	Tim Hamulack	7─4	
12	March 16	Cincinnati Reds	5─4	Danny Graves	Anastacio Martinez	─	7─5	
13	March 17	Cleveland Indians	3─1	Curt Schilling	Giovanni Carrara	Jason Shiell	8─5	
14	March 18	Cleveland Indians	10─9	Rafael Betancourt	Anastacio Martinez	─	8─6	
15	March 19	Pittsburgh Pirates	11─8	Pedro Martinez	Oliver Perez	Bobby Jones	9─6	
16	March 20	Toronto Blue Jays	9─4	Tim Wakefield	Brandon League	─	10─6	
17	March 21	Baltimore Orioles	4─2	Frank Brooks	Rodrigo Lopez	Anastacio Martinez	11─6	
18	March 22	Los Angeles Dodgers	3─2	Odalis Perez	Curt Schilling	White	11─7	
19	March 23	Tampa Bay Rays	7─4	Derek Lowe	Doug Waechter	─	12─7	
20	March 24	New York Yankees	8─6	Donovan Osborne	Tim Wakefield	Scott Proctor	12─8	
21	March 25	Minnesota Twins	12─7	Seth Greisinger	Mike Timlin	─	12─9	
22	March 26	Pittsburgh Pirates	5─1	Bronson Arroyo	Mark Guthrie	─	13─9	
23	March 27	Philadelphia Phillies	7─2	Curt Schilling	Brett Myers	─	14─9	
24	March 28	Florida Marlins	4─0	Brad Penny	Derek Lowe	Armando Benitez	14─10	
25	March 29	Baltimore Orioles	8─3	Tim Wakefield	Rick Bauer	─	15─10	
26	March 30	Toronto Blue Jays	13─8	Justin Miller	Pedro Martinez	─	15─11	
27	March 31	Pittsburgh Pirates	8─8	─	─	─	15─11─1	

April

#	Date	Opponent	Score	Win	Loss	Save	Record	Source
28	April 1	Minnesota Twins	4─3	Joe Nelson	J. C. Romero	─	16─11─1	
29	April 2	Atlanta Braves	7─3	Derek Lowe	Mike Hampton	─	17─11─1	
30	April 3	Atlanta Braves	5─0	C. J. Nitkowski	Keith Foulke	─	17─12─1	

The Red Sox also played exhibition games against Boston College and Northeastern University. The games were played as a doubleheader on March 5. The Red Sox defeated Boston College 9–3 and then defeated Northeastern University 7–0.

== Regular season records ==
=== Season standings ===
AL East
Team	W	L	Pct.	GB	Home	Road
New York Yankees	101	61	.623	—	57‍–‍24	44‍–‍37
Boston Red Sox	98	64	.605	3	55‍–‍26	43‍–‍38
Baltimore Orioles	78	84	.481	23	38‍–‍43	40‍–‍41
Tampa Bay Devil Rays	70	91	.435	30½	41‍–‍39	29‍–‍52
Toronto Blue Jays	67	94	.416	33½	40‍–‍41	27‍–‍53

=== Record vs. opponents ===
2004 American League record Source: MLB Standings Grid – 2004
Team	ANA	BAL	BOS	CWS	CLE	DET	KC	MIN	NYY	OAK	SEA	TB	TEX	TOR	NL
Anaheim	—	6–3	4–5	5–4	4–5	7–2	7–0	5–4	5–4	10–9	13–7	6–1	9–10	4–5	7–11
Baltimore	3–6	—	10–9	2–4	3–3	6–0	6–3	4–5	5–14	0–7	7–2	11–8	5–2	11–8	5–13
Boston	5–4	9–10	—	4–2	3–4	6–1	4–2	2–4	11–8	8–1	5–4	14–5	4–5	14–5	9–9
Chicago	4–5	4–2	2–4	—	10–9	8–11	13–6	9–10	3–4	2–7	7–2	4–2	6–3	3–4	8–10
Cleveland	5–4	3–3	4–3	9–10	—	9–10	11–8	7–12	2–4	6–3	5–4	3–3	1–8	5–2	10–8
Detroit	2–7	0–6	1–6	11–8	10–9	—	8–11	7–12	4–3	4–5	5–4	3–3	4–5	4–2	9–9
Kansas City	0–7	3–6	2–4	6–13	8–11	11–8	—	7–12	1–5	2–7	2–5	3–6	4–5	3–3	6–12
Minnesota	4–5	5–4	4–2	10–9	12–7	12–7	12–7	—	2–4	2–5	5–4	4–5	5–2	4–2	11–7
New York	4–5	14–5	8–11	4–3	4–2	3–4	5–1	4–2	—	7–2	6–3	15–4	5–4	12–7	10–8
Oakland	9–10	7–0	1–8	7–2	3–6	5–4	7–2	5–2	2–7	—	11–8	7–2	11–9	6–3	10–8
Seattle	7–13	2–7	4–5	2–7	4–5	4–5	5–2	4–5	3–6	8–11	—	2–5	7–12	2–7	9–9
Tampa Bay	1–6	8–11	5–14	2–4	3–3	3–3	6–3	5–4	4–15	2–7	5–2	—	2–7	9–9	15–3
Texas	10–9	2–5	5–4	3–6	8–1	5–4	5–4	2–5	4–5	9–11	12–7	7–2	—	7–2	10–8
Toronto	5–4	8–11	5–14	4–3	2–5	2–4	3–3	2–4	7–12	3–6	7–2	9–9	2–7	—	8–10

Red Sox vs. National League
Team	NL West					NL East	
Team	ARI	COL	LAD	SDP	SFG	ATL	PHI
Boston	–	1–2	2–1	2–1	1–2	1–2	2–1

=== Transactions ===
April
- April 8: John Stephens claimed off of waivers by the Red Sox from the Baltimore Orioles.
- April 9: The Red Sox placed Ramiro Mendoza on the 15-day DL; called up Mark Malaska from Pawtucket.
- April 10: The Red Sox designated Brian Daubach for assignment; called up Frank Castillo from Pawtucket.
- April 14: The Red Sox optioned Bobby Jones and Brian Daubach to Pawtucket.
- April 15: The Red Sox recalled Phil Seibel from Pawtucket.
- April 17: The Red Sox assigned Bobby Jones to Pawtucket.
- April 18: The Red Sox obtained Scott Cassidy from the Toronto Blue Jays for a player to be named later; optioned him and Frank Castillo to Pawtucket.
- April 19: The Red Sox activated pitcher Lenny DiNardo.
- April 21: The Red Sox acquired pitcher Brad Thomas from the Minnesota Twins.
- April 26: The Red Sox placed Ellis Burks on the 15-day DL.
- April 27: Brian Daubach recalled from Pawtucket by the Red Sox.

May
- May 11: The Red Sox optioned pitcher Byung Hyun Kim to Pawtucket.
- May 12: The Red Sox recalled pitcher Jamie Brown from Pawtucket.
- May 15: The Red Sox acquired Henri Stanley from the San Diego padres in exchange for cash and a player to be named later. The Red Sox also recalled Kevin Youkilis from Pawtucket and optioned Mark Malaska to Pawtucket.
- May 21: David Ortiz signs a two-year contract extension with the Red Sox through 2007.
- May 25: The Red Sox placed Bill Mueller on the 15-day DL; recalled Andy Dominique from Pawtucket.

June
- June 9: The Red Sox activated shortstop Nomar Garciaparra from the 15-day DL; recalled pitcher Mark Malaska from Pawtucket; sent Brian Daubach to outright to Pawtucket; optioned pitcher Jamie Brown to Pawtucket.
- June 11: The Red Sox activated pitcher Scott Williamson; assigned Andy Dominique to Pawtucket.
- June 14: The Red Sox signed pitchers Andrew Dobies, Tommy Hottovy, Ryan Schroyer, Cla Meredity and catcher Patrick Perry.
- June 16: The Red Sox activated right fielder Trot Nixon and sent pitcher Anastacio Martínez to Pawtucket.
- June 22: The Red Sox signed pitcher Curtis Leskanic; optioned pitcher Mark Malaska to Pawtucket.
- June 30: The Red Sox signed pitcher Pedro Astacio to a minor league contract.

July
- July 2: The Red Sox acquired pitcher Brandon Puffer from the Padres for a player to be named later and sent him to the minor leagues; traded pitcher Andrew Shipman and a player to be named later to the Cubs in exchange for Jimmy Anderson; activated third baseman Bill Mueller from the 15-day DL; placed pitcher Scott WIlliamson on the 15-day DL; designated infielder César Crespo for assignment; recalled pitcher Anastacio Martínez from Pawtucket.
- July 3: The Red Sox purchased pitcher Jimmy Anderson from Pawtucket and optioned pitcher Anastacio Martínez to Pawtucket.
- July 9: The Red Sox placed pitcher Lenny DiNardo on the 15-day DL and called up pitcher Joe Nelson from Pawtucket.
- July 10: The Red Sox designated pitcher Tim Hamulack for assignment.
- July 13: The Red Sox signed shortstop Dustin Pedroia and assigned him to Augusta.
- July 15: The Red Sox activated pitcher Ramiro Mendoza and optioned third baseman Kevin Youkilis to Pawtucket.
- July 21: The Red Sox acquired Ricky Gutiérrez from the Cubs for cash considerations and a player to be named later; placed second baseman Pokey Reese on the 15-day DL; recalled third baseman Kevin Youkilis and pitcher Mark Malaska from Pawtucket; sent pitcher Joe Nelson to Pawtucket.
- July 22: The Red Sox purchased the contracts of infielder Ricky Gutiérrez from Pawtucket and pitcher Abe Alvarez from Portland; transferred outfielder Ellis Burks from the 15-day DL to the 60-day DL; designated pitcher Jimmy Anderson for assignment.
- July 24: The Red Sox traded Portland third baseman John Hattig to the Blue Jays in exchange for pitcher Terry Adams.
- July 25: The Red Sox placed outfielder Trot Nixon and pitcher Curtis Leskanic on the 15-day DL; recalled catcher/first baseman Andy Dominique from Pawtucket.
- July 29: MLB suspended several Red Sox players for their participation in the infamous brawl on July 24. Catcher Jason Varitek was suspended for four games whilst outfielders Gabe Kapler and Trot Nixon were suspended for three.
- July 31: The Red Sox acquired shortstop Alex Gonzalez, pitchers Francis Beltrán and Justin Jones, and infielder Brendan Harris from the Cubs in exchange for shortstop Nomar Garciaparra, Sarasota outfielder Matt Murton and cash. The Red Sox then traded Gonzalez, Beltrán and Harris to the Expos for shortstop Orlando Cabrera, and traded Jones to the Twins for first baseman Doug Mientkiewicz. In a separate trade, the Red Sox acquired outfielder Dave Roberts from the Dodgers in exchange for Pawtucket outfielder Henri Stanley.

August
- August 1: The Red Sox optioned infielder Andy Dominique to Pawtucket.
- August 2: The Red Sox placed second baseman Mark Bellhorn on the 15-day DL.
- August 3: The Red Sox traded Pawtucket pitcher Jimmy Anderson to the Cubs for a player to be named later.
- August 6: The Red Sox acquired pitcher Mike Myers from the Mariners for cash and a player to be named later; optioned pitcher Mark Malaska to Pawtucket.
- August 17: The Red Sox activated pitcher Curt Leskanic; purchased the contract of infielder Earl Snyder from Pawtucket; placed third baseman Kevin Youkilis on the 15-day DL, retroactive to August 16; transferred pitcher Scott Williamson to the 60-day DL.
- August 20: The Red Sox activated second baseman Mark Bellhorn and assigned third baseman Earl Snyder to Pawtucket.
- August 31: The Red Sox purchased catcher Sandy Martínez from the Indians and assigned him to Pawtucket.

September
- September 1: The Red Sox activated third baseman Kevin Youkilis and first baseman-outfielder David McCarty from the 15-day DL; called up catcher Sandy Martínez from Pawtucket.
- September 2: The Red Sox recalled pitcher Brandon Puffer from Pawtucket.
- September 3: The Red Sox purchased the contract of Adam Hyzdu from Pawtucket and claimed infielder Tim Hummel off waivers from the Reds; designated pitcher Brandon Puffer and infielder Andy Dominique for assignment.
- September 5: The Red Sox purchased pitcher Pedro Astacio from Pawtucket.
- September 7: The Red Sox activated outfielder Trot Nixon and infielder Pokey Reese.
- September 9: The Red Sox activated pitcher Scott Williamson from the 60-day DL and designated infielder Earl Snyder for assignment.
- September 21: The Red Sox recalled pitcher Byung Hyun Kim from Pawtucket.
- September 23: The Red Sox activated designated hitter Ellis Burks from the 60-day DL and released pitcher Phil Seibel.
- September 28: MLB suspended pitcher Pedro Astacio for three games and fined him for intentionally throwing at Yankee batters in a September 26 game.

=== Opening Day lineup ===
18	Johnny Damon	CF
11	Bill Mueller	3B
24	Manny Ramirez	LF
34	David Ortiz	DH
15	Kevin Millar	1B
19	Gabe Kapler	RF
33	Jason Varitek	C
12	Mark Bellhorn	2B
3	Pokey Reese	SS
45	Pedro Martínez	P

=== Roster ===
2004 Boston Red Sox roster
Roster
Pitchers: 53 Terry Adams; 59 Abe Alvarez; 56 Jimmy Anderson; 61 Bronson Arroyo; 39 Pedro Astacio; 52 Jamie Brown; 37 Frank Castillo; 55 Lenny DiNardo; 43 Alan Embree; 29 Keith Foulke; 36 Bobby Jones; 51 Byung-hyun Kim; 30 Curtis Leskanic; 32 Derek Lowe; 46 Mark Malaska; 67 Anastacio Martínez; 45 Pedro Martínez; 26 Ramiro Mendoza; 36 Mike Myers; 57 Joe Nelson; 38 Curt Schilling; 53 Phil Seibel; 50 Mike Timlin; 49 Tim Wakefield; 48 Scott Williamson	Catchers: 58 Sandy Martínez; 28 Doug Mirabelli; 33 Jason Varitek; Infielders: 12 Mark Bellhorn; 36,44 Orlando Cabrera; 31 César Crespo; 23 Brian Daubach; 39 Andy Dominique; 5 Nomar Garciaparra; 16 Ricky Gutiérrez; 15 Kevin Millar; 10 David McCarty; 13 Doug Mientkiewicz; 11 Bill Mueller; 3 Pokey Reese; 37 Earl Snyder; 20 Kevin Youkilis	Outfielders: 18 Johnny Damon; 37 Adam Hyzdu; 19 Gabe Kapler; 7 Trot Nixon; 24 Manny Ramirez; 31 Dave Roberts; Designated hitter: 34 David Ortiz; Pinch hitter: 25 Ellis Burks	Manager: 47 Terry Francona; Coaches: 44 Bill Haselman (Interim 1B); 22 Ron Jackson (Hitting); 35 Lynn Jones (First base); 60 Dana LeVangie (Bullpen catcher); 2 Brad Mills (Bench); 54 Euclides Rojas (Bullpen); 41 Dale Sveum (Third base); 17 Dave Wallace (Pitching)

=== Road to a championship ===
The regular season started well in April, but through midseason the team struggled due to injuries, inconsistency, and defensive woes, and fell more than eight games behind New York. A bright point came on July 24, when the Red Sox overcame a five-run deficit as Bill Mueller hit a game-winning home run to right-center off Yankees closer Mariano Rivera. The game also featured a now infamous brawl between Yankee superstar Alex Rodriguez and Red Sox catcher and captain Jason Varitek.

Red Sox general manager Theo Epstein shook up the team at the MLB trading deadline July 31, trading the team's wildly popular yet often hurt and disgruntled shortstop, Nomar Garciaparra, to the Chicago Cubs, receiving Orlando Cabrera from the Montreal Expos and Doug Mientkiewicz from the Minnesota Twins in return. In a separate transaction, the Red Sox also traded Triple-A outfielder Henri Stanley to the Los Angeles Dodgers for center fielder Dave Roberts. With valuable players like Cabrera, Mientkiewicz, and Roberts in the lineup, the club turned things around, winning 22 out of 25 games and finishing three games behind the Yankees in the AL East and qualifying for the playoffs as the AL Wild Card.

The team played its home games at Fenway Park, before a regular season total attendance of 2,837,304 fans.

=== Game log ===
2004 game log
April (15–6)

#	Date	Opponent	Score	Win	Loss	Save	Attendance	Record
1	April 4	@ Orioles	7–2	Ponson (1–0)	Martínez (0–1)	Ryan (1)	47,683	0–1
2	April 6	@ Orioles	4–1	Schilling (1–0)	DuBose (0–1)	Foulke (1)	35,355	1–1
3	April 7	@ Orioles	10–3	Lowe (1–0)	Ainsworth (0–1)	—	28,373	2–1
4	April 8	@ Orioles	3–2 (13)	López (1–0)	Jones	—	31,121	2–2
5	April 9	Blue Jays	10–5	Speier (1–0)	Timlin (0–1)	—	34,337	2–3
6	April 10	Blue Jays	4–1	Martínez (1–1)	Halladay (0–2)	Foulke (2)	35,305	3–3
7	April 11	Blue Jays	6–4 (12)	Malaska (1–0)	López (0–1)	—	34,286	4–3
–	April 13	Orioles	Postponed (rain) Rescheduled for May 31					
–	April 14	Orioles	Postponed (rain) Rescheduled for July 22					
8	April 15	Orioles	12–7 (11)	Groom (1–0)	Arroyo (0–1)	—	35,271	4–4
9	April 16	Yankees	6–2	Wakefield (1–0)	Vázquez (1–1)	—	35,163	5–4
10	April 17	Yankees	5–2	Schilling (2–0)	Mussina (1–3)	—	35,023	6–4
11	April 18	Yankees	7–3 (10)	Quantrill (1–0)	Lowe (1–1)	—	35,011	6–5
12	April 19	Yankees	5–4	Timlin (1–1)	Gordon (0–1)	Foulke (3)	35,027	7–5
13	April 20	@ Blue Jays	4–2	Martínez (2–1)	Halladay (1–3)	Foulke (4)	26,010	8–5
14	April 21	@ Blue Jays	4–2	Wakefield (2–0)	Lilly (0–2)	Foulke (5)	16,163	9–5
15	April 22	@ Blue Jays	7–3	Adams (2–0)	Schilling (2–1)	—	16,480	9–6
16	April 23	@ Yankees	11–2	Lowe (2–1)	Contreras (0–2)	—	55,001	10–6
17	April 24	@ Yankees	3–2 (12)	Foulke (1–0)	Quantrill (2–1)	Timlin (1)	55,195	11–6
18	April 25	@ Yankees	2–0	Martínez (3–1)	Vázquez (2–2)	Williamson (1)	55,338	12–6
–	April 27	Devil Rays	Postponed (rain) Rescheduled for April 29					
19	April 28	Devil Rays	6–0	Schilling (3–1)	Abbott (2–2)	—	35,120	13–6
20	April 29	Devil Rays	4–0	Kim (1–0)	Zambrano (3–2)	—	35,614	14–6
21	April 29	Devil Rays	7–3	Lowe (3–1)	Moss (0–1)	—	35,441	15–6
–	April 30	@ Rangers	Postponed (rain) Rescheduled for May 1					

May (16–14)

#	Date	Opponent	Score	Win	Loss	Save	Attendance	Record
22	May 1	@ Rangers	4–3	Ramirez (1–1)	Malaska (1–1)	Cordero (8)	44,598	15–7
23	May 1	@ Rangers	8–5	Benoit (1–0)	Martínez (3–2)	Cordero (9)	44,598	15–8
24	May 2	@ Rangers	4–1	Dickey (4–1)	Wakefield (2–1)	Cordero (10)	31,538	15–9
25	May 3	@ Indians	4–3	Westbrook (2–1)	Schilling (3–2)	Betancourt (1)	16,285	15–10
26	May 4	@ Indians	7–6	Davis (1–2)	Lowe (3–2)	Betancourt (2)	16,070	15–11
27	May 5	@ Indians	9–5	Arroyo (1–1)	D'Amico (1–2)	—	17,370	16–11
28	May 6	@ Indians	5–2	Martínez (4–2)	Sabathia (1–1)	Foulke (6)	26,825	17–11
29	May 7	Royals	7–6	Timlin (2–1)	MacDougal (0–1)	—	35,280	18–11
30	May 8	Royals	9–1	Schilling (4–2)	Gobble (1–1)	—	34,929	19–11
31	May 9	Royals	8–4	May (1–4)	Lowe (3–3)	—	34,589	19–12
32	May 10	Indians	10–6	Durbin (3–3)	Kim (1–1)	—	35,257	19–13
33	May 11	Indians	5–3	Embree (1–0)	Jiménez (0–2)	Foulke (7)	35,401	20–13
34	May 12	Indians	6–4	Lee (4–0)	Wakefield (2–2)	—	35,371	20–14
35	May 13	@ Blue Jays	12–6	Batista (1–3)	Schilling (4–3)	—	20,876	20–15
36	May 14	@ Blue Jays	9–3 (10)	Embree (2–0)	Ligtenberg (1–1)	—	20,948	21–15
37	May 15	@ Blue Jays	4–0	Arroyo (2–1)	Hentgen (2–3)	—	36,841	22–15
38	May 16	@ Blue Jays	3–1	Halladay (4–4)	Martínez (4–3)	Adams (2)	31,618	22–16
39	May 18	@ Devil Rays	7–3	Wakefield (3–2)	Hendrickson (2–4)	—	12,836	23–16
40	May 19	@ Devil Rays	4–1	Schilling (5–3)	Bell (0–1)	Foulke (8)	13,960	24–16
41	May 20	@ Devil Rays	9–6	Sosa (1–0)	Lowe (3–4)	Báez (5)	12,401	24–17
42	May 21	Blue Jays	11–5	Timlin (3–1)	Nakamura (0–3)	—	35,287	25–17
43	May 22	Blue Jays	5–2	Martínez (1–0)	Ligtenberg (1–2)	Foulke (9)	35,196	26–17
44	May 23	Blue Jays	7–2	Wakefield (4–2)	Batista (2–4)	—	35,239	27–17
45	May 25	Athletics	12–2	Schilling (6–3)	Hudson (5–2)	—	35,236	28–17
46	May 26	Athletics	9–6	Lowe (4–4)	Redman (3–3)	Foulke (10)	34,931	29–17
47	May 27	Athletics	15–2	Mulder (6–2)	Arroyo (2–2)	—	35,438	29–18
48	May 28	Mariners	8–4	Martínez (5–3)	Piñeiro (1–6)	—	35,134	30–18
49	May 29	Mariners	5–4	García (3–3)	Wakefield (4–3)	Guardado (9)	35,250	30–19
50	May 30	Mariners	9–7 (12)	Martínez (2–0)	Putz (0–2)	—	35,046	31–19
51	May 31	Orioles	13–4	López (4–2)	Lowe (4–5)	—	35,465	31–20

June (11–14)

#	Date	Opponent	Score	Win	Loss	Save	Attendance	Record
52	June 1	@ Angels	7–6	Gregg (2–0)	Arroyo (2–3)	Percival (13)	43,285	31–21
53	June 2	@ Angels	10–7	Ortiz (2–4)	Timlin (3–2)	Rodríguez (2)	43,205	31–22
54	June 4	@ Royals	5–2	Gobble (3–3)	Wakefield (4–4)	Affeldt (6)	28,182	31–23
55	June 5	@ Royals	8–4	Schilling (7–3)	May (2–8)	—	29,968	32–23
56	June 6	@ Royals	5–3	Lowe (5–5)	Grimsley (3–2)	Foulke (11)	22,964	33–23
57	June 8	Padres	1–0	Martínez (6–3)	Osuna (1–1)	Foulke (12)	35,205	34–23
58	June 9	Padres	8–1	Lawrence (8–3)	Arroyo (2–4)	—	35,064	34–24
59	June 10	Padres	9–3	Schilling (8–3)	Valdez (5–3)	—	35,068	35–24
60	June 11	Dodgers	2–1	Foulke (2–0)	Martin (0–1)	—	35,173	36–24
61	June 12	Dodgers	14–5	Weaver (4–7)	Wakefield (4–5)	—	34,671	36–25
62	June 13	Dodgers	4–1	Martínez (7–3)	Nomo (3–7)	Foulke (13)	35,068	37–25
63	June 15	@ Rockies	6–3	Kennedy (5–4)	Arroyo (2–5)	Chacón (11)	40,489	37–26
64	June 16	@ Rockies	7–6	Jennings (6–6)	Schilling (8–4)	Chacón (12)	39,319	37–27
65	June 17	@ Rockies	11–0	Lowe (6–5)	Cook (1–2)	—	40,088	38–27
66	June 18	@ Giants	14–9	Timlin (4–2)	Williams (6–5)	—	42,557	39–27
67	June 19	@ Giants	6–4	Herges (3–2)	Embree (2–1)	—	42,499	39–28
68	June 20	@ Giants	4–0	Schmidt (9–2)	Arroyo (2–6)	—	42,568	39–29
69	June 22	Twins	9–2	Schilling (9–4)	Lohse (2–5)	—	35,261	40–29
70	June 23	Twins	4–2	Silva (8–4)	Lowe (6–6)	Nathan (20)	35,233	40–30
71	June 24	Twins	4–3 (10)	Balfour (2–0)	Foulke (2–1)	Nathan (21)	34,827	40–31
72	June 25	Phillies	12–1	Martínez (8–3)	Abbott (0–2)	—	35,059	41–31
73	June 26	Phillies	9–2	Madson (5–2)	Arroyo (2–7)	—	34,712	41–32
74	June 27	Phillies	12–3	Schilling (10–4)	Myers (5–5)	—	34,739	42–32
75	June 29	@ Yankees	11–3	Vázquez (9–5)	Lowe (6–7)	—	55,231	42–33
76	June 30	@ Yankees	4–2	Gordon (2–2)	Timlin (4–3)	Rivera (29)	55,023	42–34

July (14–12)

#	Date	Opponent	Score	Win	Loss	Save	Attendance	Record
77	July 1	@ Yankees	5–4 (13)	Sturtze (3–0)	Leskanic (0–4)	—	55,265	42–35
78	July 2	@ Braves	6–3 (12)	Cruz (2–0)	Martínez (2–1)	—	42,231	42–36
79	July 3	@ Braves	6–1	Schilling (11–4)	Thomson (6–7)	—	51,831	43–36
80	July 4	@ Braves	10–4	Hampton (3–8)	Lowe (6–8)	—	41,414	43–37
81	July 6	Athletics	11–0	Wakefield (5–5)	Zito (4–6)	—	35,302	44–37
82	July 7	Athletics	11–3	Martínez (9–3)	Redman (6–6)	—	35,012	45–37
83	July 8	Athletics	8–7 (10)	Leskanic (1–4)	Lehr (0–1)	—	35,144	46–37
84	July 9	Rangers	7–0	Arroyo (3–7)	Benoit (3–4)	—	35,030	47–37
85	July 10	Rangers	14–6	Lowe (7–8)	Rogers (12–3)	—	35,024	48–37
86	July 11	Rangers	6–5	Shouse (2–0)	Foulke (2–2)	Cordero (27)	34,778	48–38
87	July 15	@ Angels	8–1	Washburn (10–4)	Lowe (7–9)	—	43,623	48–39
88	July 16	@ Angels	4–2	Martínez (10–3)	Escobar (5–6)	Foulke (14)	43,771	49–39
89	July 17	@ Angels	8–3	Colón (7–8)	Wakefield (5–6)	—	43,746	49–40
90	July 18	@ Angels	6–2	Schilling (12–4)	Lackey (7–9)	—	43,613	50–40
91	July 19	@ Mariners	8–4 (11)	Myers (4–1)	Leskanic (1–5)	—	42,898	50–41
92	July 20	@ Mariners	9–7	Lowe (8–9)	Piñeiro (5–11)	Foulke (15)	46,024	51–41
93	July 21	Orioles	10–5	Bédard (4–4)	Martínez (10–4)	—	35,023	51–42
94	July 22	Orioles	8–3	López (8–6)	Alvarez (0–1)	—	34,697	51–43
95	July 22	Orioles	4–0	Wakefield (6–6)	Borkowski (1–2)	—	35,370	52–43
96	July 23	Yankees	8–7	Gordon (3–3)	Foulke (2–3)	Rivera (35)	34,933	52–44
97	July 24	Yankees	11–10	Mendoza (1–0)	Rivera (1–1)	—	34,501	53–44
98	July 25	Yankees	9–6	Lowe (9–9)	Contreras (8–4)	Foulke (16)	35,006	54–44
99	July 26	@ Orioles	12–5	Martínez (11–4)	Bédard (4–5)	—	42,113	55–44
–	July 27	@ Orioles	Postponed (rain) Rescheduled for October 2					
100	July 28	@ Orioles	4–1	Borowski (2–2)	Schilling (12–5)	—	42,113	55–45
101	July 30	@ Twins	8–2	Arroyo (4–7)	Lohse (4–8)	—	34,263	56–45
102	July 31	@ Twins	5–4	Rincón (9–3)	Embree (2–2)	Nathan (29)	40,283	56–46

August (21–7)

#	Date	Opponent	Score	Win	Loss	Save	Attendance	Record
103	August 1	@ Twins	4–3	Santana (10–6)	Timlin (4–4)	Nathan (30)	38,751	56–47
104	August 2	@ Devil Rays	6–3 (10)	Wakefield (7–6)	Hendrickson (8–9)	Foulke (17)	21,835	57–47
105	August 3	@ Devil Rays	5–2	Schilling (13–5)	Bell (4–5)	—	20,882	58–47
106	August 4	@ Devil Rays	5–4	Harper (3–2)	Arroyo (4–8)	Báez (23)	18,133	58–48
107	August 6	@ Tigers	4–3	Novoa (1–0)	Lowe (9–10)	Urbina (18)	40,674	58–49
108	August 7	@ Tigers	7–4	Martínez (12–4)	Bonderman (6–9)	—	42,607	59–49
109	August 8	@ Tigers	11–9	Wakefield (8–6)	Robertson (9–7)	Foulke (18)	40,098	60–49
110	August 9	Devil Rays	8–3	Halama (6–5)	Schilling (13–6)	—	35,172	60–50
111	August 10	Devil Rays	8–4	Arroyo (5–8)	Sosa (3–1)	—	35,191	61–50
112	August 11	Devil Rays	14–4	Lowe (10–10)	Brazelton (4–4)	—	35,091	62–50
113	August 12	Devil Rays	6–0	Martínez (13–4)	Hendrickson (8–11)	—	34,804	63–50
114	August 13	White Sox	8–7	Contreras (10–5)	Wakefield (8–7)	Takatsu (11)	35,028	63–51
115	August 14	White Sox	4–3	Schilling (14–6)	Adkins (2–3)	Foulke (19)	35,012	64–51
116	August 15	White Sox	5–4	Buehrle (11–6)	Arroyo (5–9)	Takatsu (12)	34,405	64–52
117	August 16	Blue Jays	8–4	Lowe (11–10)	Miller (1–2)	Foulke (20)	35,271	65–52
118	August 17	Blue Jays	5–4 (10)	Foulke (3–3)	Frederick (0–2)	—	35,105	66–52
119	August 18	Blue Jays	6–4	Wakefield (9–7)	Batista (9–9)	—	34,867	67–52
120	August 20	@ White Sox	10–1	Schilling (15–6)	Buehrle (11–7)	—	38,720	68–52
121	August 21	@ White Sox	10–7	Arroyo (6–9)	Stewart (0–1)	Foulke (21)	37,303	69–52
122	August 22	@ White Sox	6–5	Leskanic (2–5)	Marte (4–5)	Foulke (22)	34,355	70–52
123	August 23	@ Blue Jays	3–0	Lilly (9–8)	Martínez (13–5)	—	27,145	70–53
124	August 24	@ Blue Jays	5–4	Wakefield (10–7)	Batista (9–10)	Foulke (23)	22,217	71–53
125	August 25	@ Blue Jays	11–5	Schilling (16–6)	Towers (9–5)	—	22,479	72–53
126	August 26	Tigers	4–1	Arroyo (7–9)	Johnson (8–12)	Foulke (24)	35,153	73–53
127	August 27	Tigers	5–3	Lowe (12–10)	Maroth (10–9)	Leskanic (3)	35,018	74–53
128	August 28	Tigers	5–1	Martínez (14–5)	Bonderman (7–11)	—	35,032	75–53
129	August 29	Tigers	6–1	Wakefield (11–7)	Ledezma (3–2)	—	34,268	76–53
130	August 31	Angels	10–7	Schilling (17–6)	Lackey (11–11)	Foulke (25)	35,040	77–53

September (18–10)

#	Date	Opponent	Score	Win	Loss	Save	Attendance	Record
131	September 1	Angels	12–7	Adams (5–4)	Sele (8–2)	—	35,076	78–53
132	September 2	Angels	4–3	Lowe (13–10)	Colón (13–11)	Foulke (26)	35,050	79–53
133	September 3	Rangers	2–0	Martínez (15–5)	Wasdin (2–3)	Foulke (27)	35,151	80–53
134	September 4	Rangers	8–6	Young (1–1)	Wakefield (11–8)	Cordero (42)	34,670	80–54
135	September 5	Rangers	6–5	Schilling (18–6)	Drese (11–8)	—	34,652	81–54
136	September 6	@ Athletics	8–3	Arroyo (8–9)	Zito (10–10)	—	37,839	82–54
137	September 7	@ Athletics	7–1	Lowe (14–10)	Redman (10–11)	—	29,659	83–54
138	September 8	@ Athletics	8–3	Martínez (16–5)	Hudson (11–5)	Foulke (28)	39,575	84–54
139	September 9	@ Mariners	7–1	Madritsch (4–2)	Wakefield (11–9)	—	29,656	84–55
140	September 10	@ Mariners	13–2	Schilling (19–6)	Franklin (3–15)	—	38,100	85–55
141	September 11	@ Mariners	9–0	Arroyo (9–9)	Moyer (6–11)	—	44,401	86–55
142	September 12	@ Mariners	2–0	Meche (5–6)	Lowe (14–11)	—	43,742	86–56
143	September 14	Devil Rays	5–2	Kazmir (2–1)	Martínez (16–6)	Báez (27)	35,118	86–57
144	September 15	Devil Rays	8–6	Myers (5–1)	Núñez (0–3)	Foulke (29)	35,105	87–57
145	September 16	Devil Rays	11–4	Schilling (20–6)	Hendrickson (8–15)	—	35,048	88–57
146	September 17	@ Yankees	3–2	Timlin (5–4)	Rivera (4–2)	Foulke (30)	55,128	89–57
147	September 18	@ Yankees	14–4	Lieber (12–8)	Lowe (14–12)	—	55,153	89–58
148	September 19	@ Yankees	11–1	Mussina (12–9)	Martínez (16–7)	—	55,142	89–59
149	September 20	Orioles	10–6	Grimsley (5–6)	Wakefield (11–10)	Julio (22)	34,758	89–60
150	September 21	Orioles	3–2	Foulke (4–3)	Ryan (3–6)	—	35,083	90–60
151	September 22	Orioles	7–6 (12)	Leskanic (3–5)	Bauer (1–1)	—	35,103	91–60
152	September 23	Orioles	9–7	Williams (2–0)	Mendoza (1–1)	—	35,026	91–61
153	September 24	Yankees	6–4	Gordon (8–4)	Martínez (16–8)	Rivera (51)	35,022	91–62
154	September 25	Yankees	12–5	Foulke (5–3)	Quantrill (6–3)	—	34,856	92–62
155	September 26	Yankees	11–4	Schilling (21–6)	Brown (10–5)	—	34,582	93–62
156	September 27	@ Devil Rays	7–3	Arroyo (10–9)	Sosa (4–7)	—	17,602	94–62
157	September 28	@ Devil Rays	10–8 (11)	Mendoza (2–1)	Báez (4–4)	Foulke (31)	20,116	95–62
158	September 29	@ Devil Rays	9–4	Waechter (5–7)	Martínez (16–9)	Miller (1)	21,274	95–63

October (3–1)

#	Date	Opponent	Score	Win	Loss	Save	Attendance	Record
159	October 1	@ Orioles	8–3	Wakefield (12–10)	López (14–9)	—	39,086	96–63
160	October 2	@ Orioles	7–5	Adams (6–4)	Cabrera (12–8)	Foulke (32)	48,540	97–63
161	October 2	@ Orioles	7–5	Kim (2–1)	Grimsley (5–7)	Leskanic (4)	47,320	98–63
162	October 3	@ Orioles	3–2	Chen (2–1)	Williamson (0–1)	Ryan (3)	42,104	98–64

=== Postseason game log ===
Boston Red Sox 2004 Postseason Game Log (11–3)
American League Division Series vs. Anaheim Angels (3–0)

#	Date	Opponent	Score	Win	Loss	Save	Stadium	Attendance	Series	Streak
1	October 5	@ Angels	9–3	Schilling (1–0)	Washburn (0–1)	—	Angel Stadium of Anaheim	44,608	1–0	W1
2	October 6	@ Angels	8–3	Martínez (1–0)	Rodríguez (0–1)	Foulke (1)	Angel Stadium of Anaheim	45,118	2–0	W2
3	October 8	Angels	8–6 (10)	Lowe (1–0)	Rodríguez (0–2)	—	Fenway Park	35,547	3–0	W3
Red Sox win Series 3–0

American League Championship Series vs. New York Yankees (4–3)

#	Date	Opponent	Score	Win	Loss	Save	Stadium	Attendance	Series	Streak
1	October 12	@ Yankees	7–10	Mussina (1–0)	Schilling (0–1)	Rivera (1)	Yankee Stadium (I)	56,135	0–1	L1
2	October 13	@ Yankees	1–3	Lieber (1–0)	Martínez (0–1)	Rivera (2)	Yankee Stadium (I)	56,136	0–2	L2
3	October 16	Yankees	8–19	Vázquez (1–0)	Mendoza (0–1)	—	Fenway Park	35,126	0–3	L3
4	October 17	Yankees	6–4 (12)	Leskanic (1–0)	Quantrill (0–1)	—	Fenway Park	34,826	1–3	W1
5	October 18	Yankees	5–4 (14)	Wakefield (1–0)	Loaiza (0–1)	—	Fenway Park	35,120	2–3	W2
6	October 19	@ Yankees	4–2	Schilling (1–1)	Lieber (1–1)	Foulke (1)	Yankee Stadium (I)	56,128	3–3	W3
7	October 20	@ Yankees	10–3	Lowe (1–0)	Brown (0–1)	—	Yankee Stadium (I)	56,129	4–3	W4
Red Sox win Series 4–3

World Series vs. St. Louis Cardinals (4–0)

#	Date	Opponent	Score	Win	Loss	Save	Stadium	Attendance	Series	Streak
1	October 23	Cardinals	11–9	Foulke (1–0)	Tavárez (0–1)	—	Fenway Park	35,035	1–0	W1
2	October 24	Cardinals	6–2	Schilling (1–0)	Morris (0–1)	—	Fenway Park	35,001	2–0	W2
3	October 26	@ Cardinals	4–1	Martínez (1–0)	Suppan (0–1)	—	Busch Stadium (II)	52,015	3–0	W3
4	October 27	@ Cardinals	3–0	Lowe (1–0)	Marquis (0–1)	Foulke (1)	Busch Stadium (II)	52,037	4–0	W4
Red Sox win World Series 4–0

== Player stats ==
= Indicates team leader

=== Batting ===
==== Starters by position ====
Note: Pos = Position; G = Games played; AB = At bats; H = Hits; 2B = Doubles; 3B = Triples; HR = Home Runs; RBI = Runs Batted In; BB = Walks; R = Runs; AVG = Batting average; OBP = On Base Percentage; SLG = Slugging Percentage

Pos	Player	G	AB	H	2B	3B	HR	RBI	BB	R	AVG	OBP	SLG	Ref
C	Jason Varitek	137	463	137	30	1	18	73	62	67	.296	.390	.482	
1B	Kevin Millar	150	508	151	36	0	18	74	57	74	.297	.383	.474	
2B	Mark Bellhorn	138	523	138	37	3	17	82	88	93	.264	.373	.444	
SS	Pokey Reese	96	244	54	7	2	3	29	17	32	.221	.271	.303	
3B	Bill Mueller	110	399	113	27	1	12	57	51	75	.283	.365	.446	
LF	Manny Ramirez	152	568	175	44	0	43	130	82	108	.308	.397	.613	
CF	Johnny Damon	150	621	189	35	6	20	94	76	123	.304	.380	.477	
RF	Gabe Kapler	136	290	79	14	1	6	33	15	51	.272	.311	.390	
DH	David Ortiz	150	582	175	47	3	41	139	75	94	.301	.380	.603	

==== Other batters ====
Note: G = Games played; AB = At bats; H = Hits; 2B = Doubles; 3B = Triples; HR = Home Runs; RBI = Runs Batted In; BB = Walks; R = Runs; AVG = Batting average; OBP = On Base Percentage; SLG = Slugging Percentage

Player	G	AB	H	2B	3B	HR	RBI	BB	R	AVG	OBP	SLG	Ref
Orlando Cabrera	58	228	67	19	1	6	31	11	33	.294	.320	.465	
Kevin Youkilis	72	208	54	11	0	7	35	33	38	.260	.367	.413	
Doug Mirabelli	59	160	45	12	0	9	32	19	27	.281	.368	.525	
Nomar Garciaparra	38	156	50	7	3	5	21	8	24	.321	.367	.500	
David McCarty	91	151	39	8	1	4	17	14	24	.258	.327	.404	
Trot Nixon	48	149	47	9	1	6	23	15	24	.315	.377	.510	
Doug Mientkiewicz	49	107	23	6	1	1	10	10	13	.215	.286	.318	
Dave Roberts	45	86	22	10	0	2	14	10	19	.256	.330	.442	
César Crespo	52	79	13	2	1	0	2	0	6	.165	.165	.215	
Brian Daubach	30	75	17	8	0	2	8	10	9	.227	.326	.413	
Ricky Gutiérrez	21	40	11	1	0	0	3	2	6	.275	.310	.300	
Ellis Burks	11	33	6	0	0	1	1	3	6	.182	.270	.273	
Andy Dominique	7	11	2	0	0	0	1	0	0	.182	.182	.182	
Adam Hyzdu	17	10	3	2	0	1	2	1	3	.300	.364	.800	
Sandy Martínez	3	4	0	0	0	0	0	0	0	.000	.000	.000	
Earl Snyder	1	4	1	0	0	0	0	0	0	.250	.250	.250	
Curt Schilling	32	7	1	0	0	0	0	0	0	.143	.143	.143	
Bronson Arroyo	32	6	0	0	0	0	0	0	0	.000	.000	.000	
Derek Lowe	33	4	1	1	0	0	1	0	0	.250	.250	.250	
Pedro Martinez	33	2	0	0	0	0	0	0	0	.000	.000	.000	
Tim Wakefield	32	2	0	0	0	0	0	0	0	.000	.000	.000	

=== Pitching ===
==== Starting pitchers ====
Note: G=Games Played; GS=Games Started; IP=Innings Pitched; H=Hits; BB=Walks; R=Runs; ER=Earned Runs; SO=Strikeouts; W=Wins; L=Losses; SV=Saves; ERA=Earned Run Average

Player	G	GS	IP	H	BB	R	ER	SO	W	L	SV	ERA	Ref
Curt Schilling	32	32	226 2/3	206	35	84	82	203	21	6	0	3.26	
Pedro Martínez	33	33	217	193	61	99	94	227	16	9	0	3.90	
Tim Wakefield	32	30	188 1/3	197	63	121	102	116	12	10	0	4.87	
Derek Lowe	33	33	182 2/3	224	71	138	110	105	14	12	0	5.42	
Bronson Arroyo	32	29	178 2/3	171	47	99	80	142	10	9	0	4.03	

==== Other pitchers ====
Note: G=Games Played; GS=Games Started; IP=Innings Pitched; H=Hits; BB=Walks; R=Runs; ER=Earned Runs; SO=Strikeouts; W=Wins; L=Losses; SV=Saves; ERA=Earned Run Average

Player	G	GS	IP	H	BB	R	ER	SO	W	L	SV	ERA	Ref
Byung-hyun Kim	7	3	17 1/3	17	7	15	12	6	2	1	0	6.23	
Pedro Astacio	5	1	8 2/3	13	5	10	10	6	0	0	0	10.38	
Abe Alvarez	1	1	5	8	5	5	5	2	0	1	0	9.00	

==== Relief pitchers ====
Note: G=Games Played; GS=Games Started; IP=Innings Pitched; H=Hits; BB=Walks; R=Runs; ER=Earned Runs; SO=Strikeouts; W=Wins; L=Losses; SV=Saves; ERA=Earned Run Average

Player	G	GS	IP	H	BB	R	ER	SO	W	L	SV	ERA	Ref
Keith Foulke	72	0	83	63	15	22	20	79	5	3	32	2.17	
Mike Timlin	76	0	76 1/3	75	19	35	35	56	5	4	1	4.13	
Alan Embree	71	0	52 1/3	49	11	28	24	37	2	2	0	4.13	
Curtis Leskanic	32	0	27 2/3	24	16	11	11	22	3	2	2	3.58	
Scott Williamson	28	0	28 2/3	11	18	6	4	28	0	1	1	1.26	
Ramiro Mendoza	27	0	30 2/3	25	7	12	12	13	2	1	0	3.52	
Mike Myers	25	0	15	16	6	7	7	9	1	0	0	4.20	
Lenny DiNardo	22	0	27 2/3	34	12	17	13	21	0	0	0	4.23	
Terry Adams	19	0	27	35	6	19	18	21	2	0	0	6.00	
Mark Malaska	19	0	20	21	12	11	10	12	1	1	0	4.50	
Anastacio Martínez	11	0	10 2/3	13	6	10	10	5	2	1	0	8.44	
Jimmy Anderson	5	0	6	10	3	4	4	3	0	0	0	6.00	
Jaime Brown	4	0	7 2/3	15	4	7	5	6	0	0	0	5.87	
Dave McCarty	3	0	3 2/3	2	1	1	1	4	0	0	0	2.45	
Bobby Jones	3	0	3 1/3	3	8	2	2	3	0	1	0	5.40	
Joe Nelson	3	0	2 2/3	4	3	5	5	5	0	0	0	16.88	
Phil Seibel	2	0	3 2/3	0	5	0	0	1	0	0	0	0.00	
Frank Castillo	2	0	1	1	1	0	0	0	0	0	0	0.00	

== Postseason ==
=== Division Series ===
Boston began the playoffs by sweeping the AL West champion Anaheim Angels. The Red Sox blew out the Angels 9–3 in Game 1, scoring 7 runs in the fourth inning. However, the Sox' 2003 offseason prize pickup Curt Schilling suffered a torn tendon when he was hit by a line drive. The injury was exacerbated when Schilling fielded a ball rolling down the first base line. The second game, pitched by Pedro Martínez, stayed close until Boston scored four in the ninth inning to win 8–3. In Game 3, what looked to be a blowout turned out to be a nail-biter, as Vladimir Guerrero hit a grand slam off Mike Timlin in the top of the seventh inning to tie it at six. However, David Ortiz, who was noted for his clutch hitting, delivered in the 10th inning with a game winning two-run homer, off Jarrod Washburn, sailing over the Green Monster. The Red Sox advanced to a rematch in the 2004 American League Championship Series against their bitter rivals, the New York Yankees.

=== League Championship Series ===
Despite high hopes that the Red Sox would finally vanquish their nemesis from the Bronx, the series started disastrously for them. Curt Schilling pitched with the torn tendon sheath in his right ankle he had suffered in Game 1 of the ALDS and was routed for six runs in three innings. Yankee starter Mike Mussina retired the first 19 Red Sox that came to the plate before Mark Bellhorn broke it up with a double with one out in the top of the seventh. Despite the Sox' best effort to come back (they scored seven runs to make it 8–7), they ended up losing 10–7. In Game 2, already with his Yankees leading 1–0 for most of the game, John Olerud hit a two-run home run to put the New York team up for good. The Sox were soon down three games to none after a 19–8 loss in Game 3 in Boston. In that game, the two clubs set the record for most runs scored in a League Championship Series game. At that point in the history of baseball, no team had come back to win from a 3–0 series deficit (only the 1998 Atlanta Braves and 1999 New York Mets had ever gotten as far as a Game 6).

In Game 4, the Red Sox found themselves facing elimination, trailing 4–3 in the ninth with Yankees closer Mariano Rivera on the mound. After Rivera issued a walk to Kevin Millar, Dave Roberts came on to pinch run and promptly stole second base, this being what many consider the turning point in the series. He then scored on a Bill Mueller RBI single that sent the game to extra innings. The Red Sox went on to win the game on a two-run home run by David Ortiz in the 12th inning. In Game 5, the Red Sox were again down late, this time by the score of 4–2, after a Derek Jeter bases-clearing triple. But the Sox struck back in the eighth, as Ortiz hit a homer over the Green Monster to bring the Sox within a run. Then Jason Varitek hit a sacrifice fly to bring home Roberts, scoring the tying run. The game would go for 14 innings, capped off by many squandered Yankee opportunities, who were 1 for 13 with runners in scoring position. In the top of the 12th inning, knuckeballer Tim Wakefield came in from the bullpen, without his personal catcher, Doug Mirabelli. Varitek, the starting catcher, had trouble with Wakefield's tricky knuckleballs in the 13th: he allowed three passed balls in the top of the 13th. The third and last of those gave the Yankees runners on second and third with two out. The Red Sox were spared, however, as Rubén Sierra struck out to end the inning. In the bottom of the 14th, Ortiz would again seal the win with a game-winning RBI single that brought home Johnny Damon. The game set the record for longest postseason game in terms of time (5 hours and 49 minutes) and for the longest ALCS game (14 innings), though the former has since been broken.

With the series returning to Yankee Stadium for Game 6, the improbable comeback continued, with Curt Schilling pitching on an ankle that had three sutures wrapped in a bloody white sock (red with a blood stain). He struck out four, walked none, and only allowed one run over seven innings to lead the team to victory. Mark Bellhorn hit a three-run home run in the fourth inning. Originally called a double, the umpires conferred and agreed that the ball had actually gone into the stands before falling back into the field of play. A key play came in the bottom of the eighth inning with Derek Jeter on first and Alex Rodriguez facing Bronson Arroyo. Rodriguez hit a ground ball down the first base line. Arroyo fielded it and reached out to tag him as he raced down the line. Rodríguez slapped at the ball and it came loose, rolling down the line. Jeter scored and Rodriguez ended up on second. After conferring, however, the umpires called Rodriguez out on interference and returned Jeter to first base, the second time in the game they reversed a call. Yankees fans, upset with the calls, littered the field with debris. The umpires called police clad in riot gear to line the field in the top of the 9th inning. In the bottom of the ninth, the Yankees staged a rally and brought former Red Sox player Tony Clark, who had played well against the Red Sox since leaving the team, to the plate as the potential winning run. Closer Keith Foulke however, struck out Clark to end the game and force a Game 7. In this game, the Red Sox completed their historic comeback on the strength of Derek Lowe's one-hit, one-run pitching and Johnny Damon's two home runs, including a grand slam in the second inning off the first pitch of reliever Javier Vázquez, and defeated the New York Yankees, 10–3. Ortiz, who had the game-winning RBIs in Games 4 and 5, was named the Most Valuable Player of the series.

Major League Baseball (MLB), the National Basketball Association (NBA), and the National Hockey League (NHL) are three major American sports leagues with best-of-seven games playoff series. Coming back to win a seven-game series when down by three games had until this point only been accomplished by four NHL teams in the history of all three leagues:

- The 1942 Toronto Maple Leafs (NHL) came back from being down by three games to the Detroit Red Wings to win the 1942 Stanley Cup.
- The 1975 New York Islanders (NHL) did the same when they came back to beat the Pittsburgh Penguins in the 1975 Stanley Cup Quarterfinals.
- The Philadelphia Flyers (NHL), during their Cinderella run to the 2010 Stanley Cup Final, came back from three games down to defeat the Boston Bruins to advance to the Eastern Conference Finals.
- The Los Angeles Kings defeated the San Jose Sharks in the first round of the 2013–14 NHL Playoffs on their way to winning the 2014 Stanley Cup.

The Red Sox became (and remain) the only team in MLB history to overcome a three-game deficit in the postseason.

=== 2004 World Series ===
The Red Sox faced the St. Louis Cardinals in the 2004 World Series. The Cardinals had posted the best record in the major leagues that season and had previously defeated the Red Sox in the 1946 and 1967 Series, with both series going seven games. The third time would be the charm, however, as the momentum and confidence Boston had built up in the ALCS would overwhelm St. Louis. The Red Sox began the Series with an 11–9 win, marked by Mark Bellhorn's game-winning home run off Pesky's Pole. He later on said that he "just did what he needed to do." It was the highest scoring World Series opening game ever, breaking the previous record set in 1932. The Red Sox would go on to win Game 2 in Boston, thanks to another sensational performance by the bloody-socked Schilling. The Red Sox won both these games despite making 4 errors in each game.

In Game 3, Pedro Martínez shut out the Cardinals for seven innings. The Cardinals only made one real threat, putting runners on second and third with no outs in the third inning. However, the Cardinals' rally was killed by pitcher Jeff Suppan's baserunning gaffe. With no outs, Suppan should have scored easily from third on a Larry Walker ground ball to second baseman Bellhorn, who was playing back, conceding the run. But as Bellhorn threw out Walker at first base, Suppan inexplicably froze after taking several steps toward home and was thrown out by Sox first baseman David Ortiz as he scrambled back to third. The double play was devastating for St. Louis. The Red Sox needed one more game to win their first championship since the 1918 World Series.

In Game Four, the Red Sox did not allow a run. The game ended as Édgar Rentería, who would become the 2005 Red Sox starting shortstop, hit the ball back to Keith Foulke. After Foulke lobbed the ball to Doug Mientkiewicz, the Sox had won their first World Championship in 86 years (this was the second time that Rentería had ended a Series, as he had won it for the Florida Marlins in the 1997 World Series). The Sox held the Cardinals' offense (the best in the NL in 2004) to only three runs in the last three games, never trailing in the Series. Manny Ramírez was named World Series MVP. The Red Sox won Game Four of the series on October 27, 18 years to the day from when they lost to the New York Mets in the 1986 World Series, which was also the team's most recent World Series game loss.

The Red Sox performed well in the 2004 postseason. From the tied eighth inning of Game 5 of the ALCS against the Yankees until the end of the World Series, the Sox played 60 innings, and never trailed at any point. This was only the fourth World Series ever played in which the losing team had never held a lead, with the others being in 1963, 1966, and 1989.

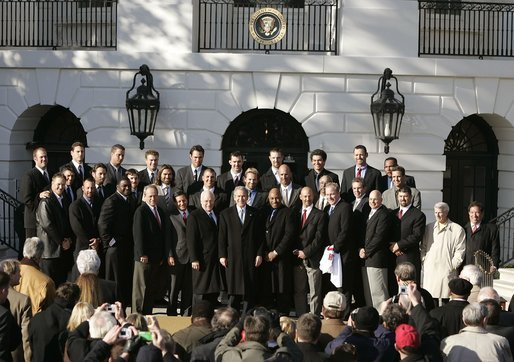
The Boston Red Sox are honored at the White House by President George W. Bush following the side's winning the 2004 World Series.

To add a final, surreal touch to the Red Sox championship title, on the night the Red Sox won, a total lunar eclipse colored the moon over Busch Stadium to a deep red hue. The Red Sox won the title about 11 minutes before totality ended. Many Red Sox fans who were turned away due to no tickets for the game were allowed to watch the final inning from inside Busch Stadium after being let in free of charge.

Fox commentator Joe Buck famously called the final out, saying:

"Back to Foulke. Red Sox fans have longed to hear it: the Boston Red Sox are World Champions!"

The Red Sox held a parade (or as Boston mayor Thomas Menino put it, a "rolling rally") on Saturday, October 30. A crowd of more than three million people filled the streets of Boston to cheer as the team rode on the city's Duck Boats. The parade followed the same route the New England Patriots took following their victories in Super Bowls Super Bowl XXXVI in 2002 and Super Bowl XXXVIII earlier in 2004.

Following their World Series win, the Red Sox replaced the dirt from the field as a "fresh start." They earned many accolades from sports media and throughout the nation for their season.

Pitcher Derek Lowe said that with the win, the chants of "1918!" would no longer echo at Yankee Stadium again.

The Patriots win in the Super Bowl meant the Red Sox World Series win made Boston the first city to have Super Bowl and World Series champions in the same year in 25 years, when the Pittsburgh Steelers won Super Bowl XIII, followed by the Pirates winning the 1979 World Series. The Patriots winning Super Bowl XXXIX in the ensuing offseason made Boston the first city to have two Super Bowls and one World Series championship over a span of 12 months since Pittsburgh in 1979–1980.

After the Bruins won the 2011 Stanley Cup Final, which made Boston the first city to win championships in all four sports leagues in the new millennium, Dan Shaughnessy of The Boston Globe ranked all seven championships by the Boston teams (the Patriots in the Super Bowls played in 2002, 2004 and 2005, the Red Sox in 2004 and 2007, the Celtics in 2008, and the Bruins in 2011) and picked the Red Sox win in 2004 as the greatest Boston sports championship during the ten-year span.

== Awards and honors ==
The entire team was awarded Sports Illustrated's 2004 Sportsman of the Year honors.

- David Ortiz – Silver Slugger Award (DH)
- Manny Ramirez – Silver Slugger Award (OF) Hank Aaron Award.
- Kevin Youkilis – AL Rookie of the Month (May)

All-Star Game

- David Ortiz ─ reserve 1B
- Manny Ramirez ─ starting LF
- Curt Schilling ─ reserve P

League Leaders

- Manny Ramirez led the league in slugging average (.613) and home runs (43)
- Curt Schilling led the league in wins (21) and winning percentage (.778)

== Farm system ==
Level	Team	League	Manager
AAA	Pawtucket Red Sox	International League	Buddy Bailey
AA	Portland Sea Dogs	Eastern League	Ron Johnson
A-Advanced	Sarasota Red Sox	Florida State League	Todd Claus
A	Augusta GreenJackets	South Atlantic League	Chad Epperson
A-Short Season	Lowell Spinners	New York–Penn League	Luis Alicea
Rookie	GCL Red Sox	Gulf Coast League	Ralph Treuel
Rookie	DSL Red Sox	Dominican Summer League	Nelson Paulino
Rookie	VSL Red Sox	Venezuelan Summer League	Josman Robles

The VSL team was also known as Ciudad Alianza.
