= 2000 Eastern League season =

The 2000 Eastern League season began on approximately April 1 and the regular season ended on approximately September 1.

The New Haven Ravens defeated the Reading Phillies 3 games to 1 to win the Eastern League Championship Series.

== Regular season ==
=== Standings ===
Eastern League - Northern Division
Team	Win	Loss	%	GB
Binghamton Mets	82	58	.586	–
**New Haven Ravens**	82	60	.577	1.0
Norwich Navigators	76	66	.535	7.0
Portland Sea Dogs	71	70	.504	11.5
Trenton Thunder	67	75	.472	16.0
New Britain Rock Cats	51	91	.359	32.0

Eastern League - Southern Division
Team	Win	Loss	%	GB
**Reading Phillies**	85	57	.599	–
Harrisburg Senators	76	67	.531	9.5
Akron Aeros	75	68	.524	10.5
Altoona Curve	74	68	.521	11.0
Bowie Baysox	65	77	.458	20.0
Erie SeaWolves	47	94	.333	37.5

Notes:

Green shade indicates that team advanced to the playoffs
Bold indicates that team advanced to ELCS
Italics indicates that team won ELCS

=== Statistical league leaders ===
==== Batting leaders ====
Stat	Player	Total
AVG	Mike Kinkade (Binghamton Mets and Bowie Baysox)	.358
HR	Adam Hyzdu (Altoona Curve)	31
RBI	Adam Hyzdu (Altoona Curve)	106
R	Adam Hyzdu (Altoona Curve); César Crespo (Portland Sea Dogs)	96; 96

==== Pitching leaders ====
Stat	Player	Total
W	Greg Wooten (New Haven Ravens)	17
ERA	Greg Wooten (New Haven Ravens)	2.31
SO	Brandon Duckworth (Reading Phillies)	178
SV	Jerrod Riggan (Binghamton Mets); Domingo Jean (Norwich Navigators)	28; 28

== Playoffs ==
=== Divisional Series ===
==== Northern Division ====
The New Haven Ravens defeated the Binghamton Mets in the Northern Division playoffs 3 games to 1.

==== Southern Division ====
The Reading Phillies defeated the Harrisburg Senators in the Southern Division playoffs 3 games to 0.

=== Championship Series ===
The New Haven Ravens defeated the Reading Phillies in the ELCS 3 games to 1.
