= 2005 Eastern League season =

The 2005 Eastern League season began on approximately April 1 and the regular season ended on approximately September 1.

The Akron Aeros defeated the Portland Sea Dogs 3 games to 1 to win the Eastern League Championship Series.

== Regular season ==
=== Standings ===
Eastern League - Northern Division
Team	Win	Loss	%	GB
**Portland Sea Dogs**	76	66	.535	–
Trenton Thunder	74	68	.521	2.0
Norwich Navigators	71	71	.500	9.0
New Britain Rock Cats	70	72	.493	6.0
New Hampshire Fisher Cats	68	74	.479	8.0
Binghamton Mets	63	79	.444	13.0

Eastern League - Southern Division
Team	Win	Loss	%	GB
**Akron Aeros**	84	58	.592	–
Altoona Curve	76	66	.535	8.0
Bowie Baysox	74	68	.521	10.0
Reading Phillies	69	73	.486	15.0
Harrisburg Senators	64	78	.451	20.0
Erie SeaWolves	63	79	.444	21.0

Notes:

Green shade indicates that team advanced to the playoffs
Bold indicates that team advanced to ELCS
Italics indicates that team won ELCS

=== Statistical league leaders ===
==== Batting leaders ====
Stat	Player	Total
AVG	Randy Ruiz (Reading Phillies)	.349
HR	Shelley Duncan (Trenton Thunder)	34
RBI	Mike Jacobs (Binghamton Mets)	93
R	Chris Roberson (Reading Phillies)	90

==== Pitching leaders ====
Stat	Player	Total
W	Allen Davis (Reading Phillies)	13
ERA	Jon Lester (Portland Sea Dogs)	2.61
SO	Jon Lester (Portland Sea Dogs)	163
SV	Edwin Almonte (Erie SeaWolves)	33

== Playoffs ==
=== Divisional Series ===
==== Northern Division ====
The Portland Sea Dogs defeated the Trenton Thunder in the Northern Division playoffs 3 games to 2.

==== Southern Division ====
The Akron Aeros defeated the Altoona Curve in the Southern Division playoffs 3 games to 2.

=== Championship Series ===
The Akron Aeros defeated the Portland Sea Dogs in the ELCS 3 games to 1.
