= Roberto Petagine =

Venezuelan baseball player (born 1971)

- First baseman
- Born: June 2, 1971 (age 55); Bronx, New York, U.S.
- Batted: Left Threw: Left

Professional debut
- MLB: April 4, 1994, for the Houston Astros
- KBO: May 17, 2008, for the LG Twins
- NPB: April 2, 1999, for the Yakult Swallows

Last appearance
- MLB: July 8, 2006, for the Seattle Mariners
- NPB: October 18, 2010, for the Fukuoka SoftBank Hawks
- KBO: September 18, 2009, for the LG Twins

MLB statistics
- Batting average: .227
- Home runs: 12
- Run batted in: 54

NPB statistics
- Batting average: .312
- Home runs: 233
- Runs batted in: 635

KBO statistics
- Batting average: .338
- Home runs: 33
- Runs batted in: 135
- Stats at Baseball Reference

Teams
- Houston Astros (1994); San Diego Padres (1995); New York Mets (1996–1997); Cincinnati Reds (1998); Yakult Swallows (1999–2002); Yomiuri Giants (2003–2004); Boston Red Sox (2005); Seattle Mariners (2006); LG Twins (2008–2009); Fukuoka SoftBank Hawks (2010)

Career highlights and awards
- 2001 Central League MVP

Roberto Antonio Petagine Guerra (/pɛtəˈɡɪneɪ/; born June 2, 1971) is a Venezuelan former professional baseball player of Italian descent. His Major League Baseball career includes brief stints with the Houston Astros (1994), San Diego Padres (1995), New York Mets (1996 and 1997), Cincinnati Reds (1998), Boston Red Sox (2005), and Seattle Mariners (2006); but he is best known for his success in the Japanese Central League between 1999 and 2004 where, as a member of the Yakult Swallows (1999–2002) and Yomiuri Giants (2003–2004), he was among Nippon Professional Baseball's premier offensive players.

== Career ==
=== Minor league career ===
Petagine entered professional baseball on February 13, 1990, at the age of 18, when Houston signed him as an undrafted amateur free agent after starting his career in Venezuela with the Leones del Caracas baseball team in which he contributed with his power for several campaigns becoming a star and a well-known baseball player in his country. Later that year, he played his first pro season with the rookie-level GCL Astros of the Gulf Coast League. His production there, and the following year with Single-A Burlington, was solid (if unspectacular). Petagine would go on to substantial minor league success in his early to mid 20s, but even his early stats hinted at the trends that would define—and perhaps curse—his career in American baseball: always having an above-average OBP, but relatively little home run power, by the standards historically applied to first basemen.

A solid contact hitter who used the whole field with occasional pull power, the young Petagine was indeed most noteworthy for his control of the strike zone, and more specifically for the exceptional rate at which he drew walks. His breakout years were in 1992 through 1994, as he moved through the minors to Triple-A, cumulatively averaging an OBP above .400 and a .500+ slugging percentage.

Baseball America twice ranked him among the Astros' top ten prospects (in 1992 and 1994 Houston Astros Baseball America Top Ten Prospects, 1992 - 2013); he was a three-time All-Star (1996–1998) in Triple-A; and he won the International League MVP Award in back-to-back years: 1997 as a member of the Mets' Triple-A affiliate in Norfolk and 1998 as a member of the Reds' Triple-A affiliate in Indianapolis. Despite his early successes, though, Petagine would never become a regular in the majors, nor receive much chance to play his way into the role; he was traded three times between December, 1994 and February, 1998, and in December 1998 the Reds sold his contract to the Yakult Swallows.

=== Nippon Professional Baseball ===
A new home helped revitalize Petagine's career. Let go by the Reds in 1998, he proved a welcome addition in the Japanese Central League, as he won three Gold Gloves, two home run titles and one Central League MVP award while playing for the Yakult Swallows (1999–2002) and Yomiuri Giants (2003–04). For Yakult and Yomiuri, Petagine hit .317 with 223 home runs and 594 RBI in 756 games.

In 2003–04, Petagine became the highest-paid baseball player in Japan. The Giants acquired him to take the place of Hideki Matsui, who had signed with the New York Yankees to play in Major League Baseball. However, Petagine was often forced to play as an outfielder because the Giants already had a first baseman in Kazuhiro Kiyohara. Still, he put up excellent numbers at the plate for those two seasons, producing a total of 73 home runs and 165 RBIs.

=== Return to North American baseball ===
Before the 2005 season, the Boston Red Sox agreed to a minor league contract with Petagine. He underwent knee surgery in spring training, preventing him from making the 25-man roster. In August, first baseman John Olerud was placed on the 15-day disabled list and his roster spot was filled by Petagine, who'd had a productive Triple-A season (including a .327 batting average with 20 home runs and 69 RBI in 74 games at Pawtucket). In 18 games with Boston, he hit .281 (9-for-34) with one home run and nine RBI.

The Red Sox declined to sign Petagine for the 2006 season. He signed a minor league contract with the Seattle Mariners, and was invited to spring training. After a productive spring, he made the major league team as a backup to Richie Sexson. On July 9, 2006, he was designated for assignment by the Mariners.

To start the 2008 season, Petagine played first base for the Diablos Rojos del Mexico of the Mexican League. In 37 games, he batted .372 with six home runs and 27 RBIs.

=== Korean baseball ===
On May 12, 2008, the LG Twins announced that he would join the team, replacing starting pitcher Jamie Brown on the roster. The contract was worth a prorated $250,000 for the remainder of 2008. In his first full season with the LG Twins in 2009, Petagine hit 26 home runs and had 100 RBIs.

=== Return to Japan ===
Petagine returned to NPB in 2010 to play one season for the Fukuoka SoftBank Hawks before retiring. He batted .261 with 10 home runs and 41 RBIs in 81 games.

== See also ==
- List of Major League Baseball players from Venezuela
