= Dicky Gonzalez =

Puerto Rican baseball player (born 1978)

- Starting pitcher
- Born: December 21, 1978 (age 46); Bayamón, Puerto Rico
- Batted: Right Threw: Right

Professional debut
- MLB: May 1, 2001, for the New York Mets
- NPB: July 3, 2004, for the Yakult Swallows

Last appearance
- MLB: May 12, 2004, for the Tampa Bay Devil Rays
- NPB: 2013, for the Chiba Lotte Marines

MLB statistics
- Win–loss record: 3-2
- Earned run average: 5.02
- Strikeouts: 38

NPB statistics
- Win–loss record: 45-41
- Earned run average: 3.55
- Strikeouts: 508
- Stats at Baseball Reference

Teams
- New York Mets (2001); Tampa Bay Devil Rays (2004); Yakult Swallows Tokyo Yakult Swallows (2004–2008); Yomiuri Giants (2009–2012); Chiba Lotte Marines (2013)

Career highlights and awards
- 1× Central League Best Nine Award (2009); 1× Central League Golden Glove Award (2009); 1× NPB All-Star (2009); 2× Japan Series champion (2009, 2012)

Dicky Angel Gonzalez Vallenilla (born December 21, 1978) is a Puerto Rican former professional baseball pitcher. He played in Major League Baseball (MLB) for the New York Mets and Tampa Bay Rays and in Nippon Professional Baseball for the Tokyo Yakult Swallows, Yomiuri Giants, and Chiba Lotte Marines.

== Career ==
Gonzalez was drafted by the New York Mets in the 16th round of the 1996 Major League Baseball draft. He played part of the 2001 season for the Mets. Prior to the 2002 season, he was traded with Bruce Chen, Luis Figueroa, and a player to be named later (Saúl Rivera) to the Montreal Expos for Phil Seibel, Scott Strickland and Matt Watson. Prior to the 2003 season, he was selected off waivers by the Boston Red Sox.

Gonzalez pitched for the Tampa Bay Devil Rays organization in 2004, pitching for the Devil Rays briefly. He was released on June 7, 2004. He joined the Tokyo Yakult Swallows and their farm team in 2004. He missed all of 2007 with an elbow injury.

He played in the 2006 World Baseball Classic for Puerto Rico.

After the 2008 season with the Swallows which saw him make only eight starts (1-5, 4.30), he was released. The Giants signed Gonzalez to a one-year, 30 million yen contract in the offseason. Gonzalez ended up having a career year in 2009, as he set career highs pretty much across the board. In 23 starts, he finished with 15 wins against two losses in 162 innings pitched, recorded a 2.11 ERA, and had two complete games. He started two games in the 2009 Japan Series against the Hokkaido Nippon Ham Fighters, winning one and receiving a no-decision in the other.

== See also ==
- List of Major League Baseball players from Puerto Rico
