= Anastacio Martínez =

Dominican baseball player (born 1978)

- Pitcher
- Born: November 3, 1978 (age 47); Villa Mella, Dominican Republic
- Batted: Right Threw: Right

MLB debut
- May 22, 2004, for the Boston Red Sox

Last MLB appearance
- July 2, 2004, for the Boston Red Sox

MLB statistics
- Win–loss record: 2–1
- Earned run average: 8.44
- Strikeouts: 5

CPBL statistics
- Win–loss record: 1–2
- Earned run average: 3.71
- Strikeouts: 24
- Stats at Baseball Reference

Teams
- Boston Red Sox (2004); Sinon Bulls (2009)

Anastacio Euclides Martínez (born November 3, 1978) is a Dominican former professional baseball pitcher. He played part of the 2004 season in Major League Baseball for the Boston Red Sox, and most recently played for the Calgary Vipers. He is listed with a height of 6'2" and a weight of 180 lbs., and he bats and throws right-handed. He graduated from Liceo Santa Cruz College in the Dominican Republic.

== Career ==
=== Boston Red Sox ===
Martínez was acquired by the Boston Red Sox as a non-drafted free agent in 1997. The Red Sox assigned Martínez to the Gulf Coast Red Sox, their Rookie-level minor league affiliate, where in 1998 he made ten starts, posting a 2–3 record with an ERA of 3.18. The club promoted him to the Single-A Lowell Spinners for the 1999 season, where he went 0–3 with a 3.68 ERA before being promoted to the Single-A Augusta GreenJackets. While Martínez initially struggled at Augusta; over the next two seasons (1999–2000) he went 11–10 with an ERA of 5.96. Martínez improved however, and at the end of the 2000 season narrowly missed pitching a no-hitter, giving up a one-out single in the 9th inning against the Asheville Tourists. Martínez's performance came just two days after teammate Eric Glaser threw a no-hitter against the Hagerstown Suns.

In 2001 the Red Sox promoted Martínez to the High-A Sarasota Red Sox where he went 9–12 with an ERA of 3.35. Following the 2001 season the Red Sox placed Martínez on their 40-man roster and promoted him to the Double-A Trenton Thunder. Following spring training Martínez spent the entirety of the 2002 season with Trenton, going 5–12 with a 5.31 ERA. One sportswriter, who considered Martínez a top prospect, said that Martínez showed "flashes of brilliance but also considerable inconsistency at Trenton."

Martínez began what would be prove to be an unusual 2003 season with the Triple-A Pawtucket Red Sox, but the Red Sox soon moved him down to the Double-A Portland Sea Dogs, intending to convert him into a closer. In 34 relief appearances with Portland Martínez posted a 3–1 record with 14 saves and a 2.25 ERA. On July 22, 2003, the Red Sox traded Martínez and Brandon Lyon to the Pittsburgh Pirates for Scott Sauerbeck and Mike González. The Pirates assigned Martínez to the Double-A Altoona Curve, where he made three relief appearances before, in a strange twist, the Pirates sent him and Lyon right back to Boston on August 1, along with Jeff Suppan, while Boston returned Gonzalez while adding Freddy Sanchez. The Pirates had raised concerns over the state of Lyon's elbow (Lyon would miss the entire 2004 season); the new trade effectively canceled the old one. Martínez finished out the season at Pawtucket.

Martínez was a strong candidate to make the major-league team in 2004 but was optioned to Pawtucket in late March. The Red Sox called him up on May 22 to replace the injured Scott Williamson, and Martínez made his major-league debut with Boston on May 22, 2004, in relief of another Martínez - Pedro. After a strong start, going 2–0 with a 1.12 appearances, Martínez was lit up in interleague play and the Red Sox optioned him back to Pawtucket in June when outfielder Trot Nixon came off the disabled list. Boston manager Terry Francona was optimistic about Martínez's future: "I think he'll go back to Triple A and be a better pitcher. He'll be back here." Indeed, the Red Sox recalled Martínez on July 2 as Williamson returned to the disabled list. His return was, however, short lived: entering the 12th inning of a 3–3 tie with the Atlanta Braves, Martínez surrendered a game-winning three-run home run to Nick Green; the next day the Red Sox sent him back to Pawtucket and called up Jimmy Anderson. During his two stints with Boston, he made 11 relief appearances, going 2–1 with an 8.44 ERA and a save. At Pawtucket, in 38 games, he had a 3.74 ERA.

Martínez spent the entire 2005 season in Pawtucket, working as both a starter and reliever. He posted a 3–4 record with a 5.98 ERA and one save. At the end of the year the Red Sox granted him free agency.

=== Washington Nationals ===
On February 6, 2006, Washington Nationals signed Martínez to a minor league contract. Following minor-league spring training the Nationals assigned Martínez to the Double-A Harrisburg Senators, but he made just two appearances before being promoted to the Triple-A New Orleans Zephyrs, where he went 5–11 on the year with a 4.48 ERA as a starter. The Nationals signed Martínez to a new contract for 2007 but initially sent him to Harrisburg. After six appearances the Nationals moved Martínez up to the Triple-A Columbus Clippers, where he made nine appearances, half of them starts, before being traded to the Detroit Tigers organization for a player to be named later. The Tigers assigned Martínez to the Triple-A Toledo Mud Hens.

=== Detroit Tigers ===
Martínez made six starts but also worked out of the bullpen at Toledo during the 2007 season, going 4–4 with a 4.24 ERA. The Tigers signed Martínez to a new contract in 2008 and he returned to Toledo. The Tigers moved Martínez to the Double-A Erie SeaWolves in June to make room for Aquilino López, but recalled Martínez to Toledo in July to replace Preston Larrison. He was released by the Tigers on August 30, 2008.

Martínez pitched for the Estrellas de Oriente in the Dominican Winter League but did not meet with success, going 0–1 with an ERA of 7.45 in seven appearances.

After spending 2009 out of baseball, Martínez played for the Calgary Vipers of the independent Golden Baseball League in 2010.
