= Luis Figueroa (baseball) =

Puerto Rican baseball player (born 1974)

Luis Figueroa Rodriguez
- Infielder
- Born: February 16, 1974 (age 52); Bayamón, Puerto Rico
- Batted: Switch Threw: Right

MLB debut
- June 27, 2001, for the Pittsburgh Pirates

Last MLB appearance
- June 25, 2007, for the San Francisco Giants

MLB statistics
- Batting average: .125
- Hits: 2
- Runs scored: 2
- Stats at Baseball Reference

Teams
- Pittsburgh Pirates (2001); Toronto Blue Jays (2006); San Francisco Giants (2007)
Medals
Men's baseball
Representing Puerto Rico
World Baseball Classic
Silver medal – second place	2013 San Francisco	Team

Luis R. Figueroa (born February 16, 1974) is a Puerto Rican former professional infielder. He is a cousin of former major leaguer José Hernández.

== Career ==
Figueroa was signed as an undrafted free agent by the Pittsburgh Pirates in 1997, and made his major league debut on July 27, 2001.

Claimed off waivers by the New York Mets that August 15, on April 5, 2002, Figueroa was part of a 7-player trade that sent him, Saúl Rivera, Bruce Chen, and Dicky Gonzalez to the Montreal Expos for Scott Strickland, Phil Seibel, and Matt Watson. From 2002–2005, Figueroa played in the Expos, Mets, Brewers, and Red Sox organizations.

In 2006, he signed a minor league contract with the Toronto Blue Jays, playing most of the season with their Syracuse SkyChiefs, but was called up to play in 8 games.

Figueroa signed a minor league contract with the San Francisco Giants for the 2007 season, appearing in 6 more major league games, then signed a minor league contract with the Chicago Cubs in 2008. In December 2008, he signed a minor league contract with the Los Angeles Angels of Anaheim.

In March 2010, he signed a minor league contract with the Blue Jays. He split the 2009 season between the Arizona League Angels, and the Salt Lake Bees.

The Milwaukee Brewers signed Figueroa to a minor league contract on April 17, 2011. He was released in early May.

On May 11, 2011, Figueroa was signed to a minor league deal by the New York Mets. He last played in 2012 for the independent Sugar Land Skeeters.
