= Brandon Puffer =

American baseball player (born 1975)

- Pitcher
- Born: October 5, 1975 (age 51); Downey, California, U.S.
- Batted: Right Threw: Right

MLB debut
- April 17, 2002, for the Houston Astros

Last MLB appearance
- June 26, 2005, for the San Francisco Giants

MLB statistics
- Win–loss record: 3–4
- Earned run average: 5.09
- Strikeouts: 71
- Stats at Baseball Reference

Teams
- Houston Astros (2002–2003); San Diego Padres (2004); San Francisco Giants (2005)

Brandon Duane Puffer (born October 5, 1975) is an American former professional baseball pitcher. A relief pitcher, Puffer played in Major League Baseball (MLB) with the Houston Astros (2002–2003), San Diego Padres (2004), and San Francisco Giants (2005) and received a World Series ring with the 2004 Boston Red Sox.

== Career ==
Puffer was drafted by the Minnesota Twins in the 27th round of the 1994 Major League Baseball draft and played two seasons for their Gulf Coast League affiliate before being released. On May 28, 1996, Puffer signed with the California Angels, playing two seasons for them before his release on December 15, 1997. He signed with the Cincinnati Reds on January 14, 1998, and played as high as Double-A before becoming a free agent after the 1999 season; he had an earned run average of 1.99 in 63 1/3 innings with Clinton in 1999. On November 18, 1999, he signed with the Colorado Rockies, but was released on May 18, 2000.

Puffer played with the Somerset Patriots of the Atlantic League before his contract was purchased by the Astros on July 17, 2000. He made his major league debut on April 17, 2002, for the Astros, pitching 69 innings with an earned run average of 4.43 for the season. He was released by the Astros on November 19, 2003. On January 14, 2004, Puffer signed with the Padres, but the Boston Red Sox purchased his contract on July 2.

Puffer was promoted to Boston on September 2, 2004, and was in the Red Sox bullpen that night but did not pitch. He was designated for assignment the next day by the Red Sox in order to clear a roster spot for outfielder Adam Hyzdu. Boston ultimately won the World Series championship that fall, and team owner John W. Henry decided championship rings would be given to any player that was on the Red Sox roster that year. Despite never having thrown a single pitch for the Red Sox, Puffer received a World Series ring. The 18-carat white gold ring was encrusted with diamonds and adorned with a ruby "B". It was featured on a 2013 episode of Pawn Stars, but was not sold because cast member Corey Harrison was concerned of Puffer's reputation.

Puffer became a free agent after the 2004 season and signed with the Giants. A free agent again at the end of the 2005 season, Puffer signed back with the Astros, but was released on July 25, 2006, without appearing in a major league game. Three days later, he signed with the Oakland Athletics and spent the rest of the season playing for their Triple-A affiliate, the Sacramento River Cats.

Before the 2007 season, Puffer signed with the Texas Rangers, playing for their Double-A affiliate, the Frisco RoughRiders. He started 2008 with the RoughRiders before being promoted to Triple-A Oklahoma. He then became a free agent at the end of the season.

== Arrest and imprisonment ==
On September 13, 2008, Puffer was arrested after the RoughRiders playoff game against the Arkansas Travelers for burglary of a habitation with the intent to commit a felony (sexual assault). The offense carried penalties of up to 99 years imprisonment and a $10,000 fine. Puffer was found guilty on July 2, 2009, in a Collin County courtroom, and sentenced to five years in prison. He became eligible for parole on January 26, 2010, and his sentence ran through June 30, 2014. He made parole by 2011.
