= Saúl Rivera =

Puerto Rican baseball player (born 1977)

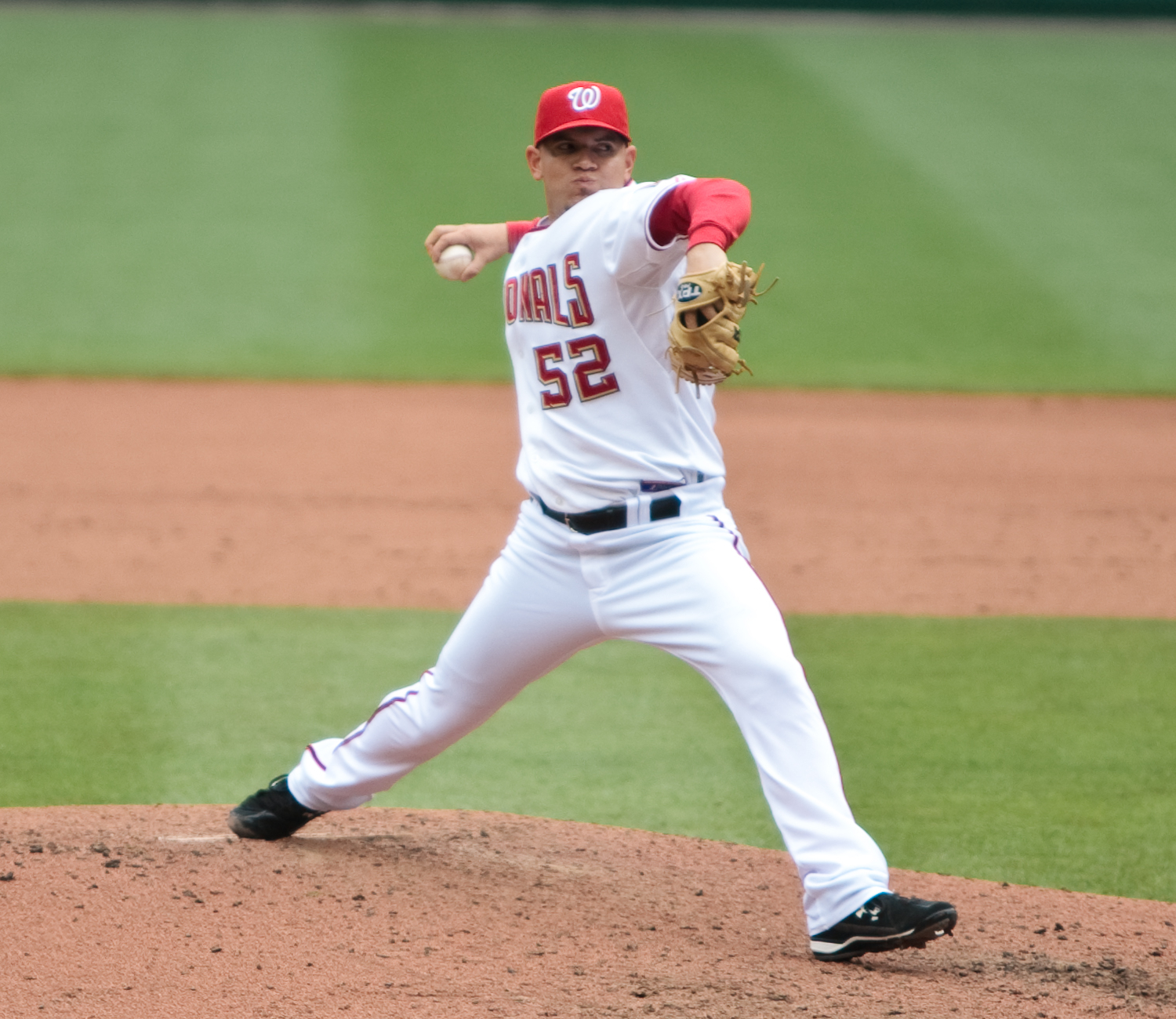
- Rivera with the Washington Nationals
- Relief pitcher
- Born: December 7, 1977 (age 48); San Juan, Puerto Rico
- Batted: Switch Threw: Right

MLB debut
- May 25, 2006, for the Washington Nationals

Last MLB appearance
- May 29, 2010, for the Arizona Diamondbacks

MLB statistics
- Win–loss record: 13–15
- Earned run average: 4.29
- Strikeouts: 192
- Stats at Baseball Reference

Teams
- Washington Nationals (2006–2009); Arizona Diamondbacks (2010)

Rabell Saúl Rivera (born December 7, 1977) is a Puerto Rican former professional baseball pitcher. He played in Major League Baseball (MLB) for the Washington Nationals and Arizona Diamondbacks.

== Career ==
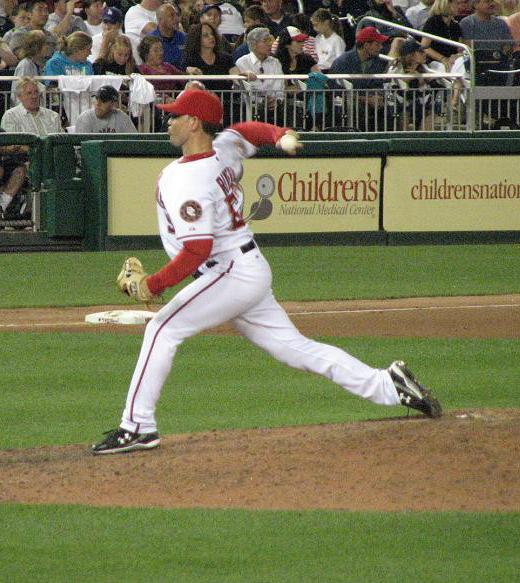
Rivera in 2008 with the Nationals

=== Minnesota Twins ===
Rivera attended the University of Mobile, and was drafted in the ninth round of the 1998 Major League Baseball draft by the Minnesota Twins. He was assigned to the Elizabethton Twins after signing. He was promoted to the Quad Cities River Bandits in 1999, where he would spend the season. In 2000, he began the season with the advanced Single-A Fort Myers Miracle before receiving a promotion to the Double-A New Britain Rock Cats. He would spend the 2001 season with New Britain, pitching in 33 games for the club. He was added to the Twins roster in the offseason.

=== New York Mets ===
On November 20, 2001, Rivera was selected off waivers by the New York Mets. He began the 2002 season with the Double-A Binghamton Mets.

=== Montreal Expos ===
On July 16, 2002, the Mets sent Rivera to the Montreal Expos as the player to be named later for the April trade of Bruce Chen, Dicky Gonzalez, and Luis Figueroa to Montreal in exchange for Scott Strickland, Phil Seibel, and Matt Watson. He was assigned to the AA Harrisburg Senators upon his acquisition. He began the 2004 season with Harrisburg.

=== Milwaukee Brewers ===
On June 7, 2004, the Expos traded Rivera to the Milwaukee Brewers with Peter Bergeron for Jason Childers and Jason Belcher. He was assigned to the Double-A Huntsville Stars. Rivera elected free agency on October 15, 2004.

=== Washington Nationals ===
On November 16, 2004, he signed with the Washington Nationals. He played for Harrisburg in 2005, playing in 40 total games for the team. Rivera made his MLB debut on May 25, 2006, for the Washington Nationals against the Houston Astros. In that game, he got his first hold, pitching 2/3 of an inning. He struck out one and walked one. He had been called up from Triple-A New Orleans on May 22, 2006. He finished his rookie season with a 3.43 ERA. He struck out 41 and walked 32. In 2007, he only allowed one home run in 93 innings pitched. Rivera spent 2007 between the major league club and the Triple-A Columbus Clippers, pitching in 85 games for Washington. In 2008, played the entirety of the season with Washington, pitching in 76 games. In 2009, Rivera played in 30 games for the Triple-A Syracuse Chiefs and 30 for the major league club. On December 7, 2009, Rivera was released by the Nationals to make room on the 40-man roster for Brian Bruney.

=== Cleveland Indians ===
On December 21, 2009, Rivera signed a minor league contract with an invite to Spring training with the Cleveland Indians. He began the season with the Triple-A Columbus Clippers.

=== Arizona Diamondbacks ===
On May 17, 2010, Rivera was traded to the Arizona Diamondbacks for cash considerations. He would play for the Triple-A Reno Aces, but also appear in 4 major league games for Arizona, pitching to a 22.09 ERA over 3.2 innings. He was designated for assignment on June 8, he cleared waivers and was sent outright to Triple-A Reno Aces on June 11. He was released on July 26, 2010.

=== Cleveland Indians (second stint) ===
On August 21, 2010, Rivera re-signed with the Cleveland Indians on a minor league contract, and was assigned to Triple-A Columbus the following day. He elected free agency on October 5.

=== Saraperos de Saltillo ===
On March 28, 2011, Rivera signed with the Saraperos de Saltillo of the Mexican League. He was released on June 29. In 12 games 13.1 innings of relief he struggled going 1-0 with a 6.08 ERA with 7 strikeouts and 1 save.

=== Road Warriors ===
On July 5, 2011, Rivera signed with the Road Warriors of the Atlantic League of Professional Baseball. He became a free agent after the season. In 28 games 42 innings of relief he went 2-4 with a 4.29 ERA and 29 strikeouts.

=== Sugar Land Skeeters ===
On July 31, 2012, Rivera signed with the Sugar Land Skeeters of the Atlantic League of Professional Baseball. He pitched to a 2.20 ERA over 18 games for Sugar Land, including 17 strikeouts. He became a free agent after the season.
