= Scott Williamson =

American baseball player (born 1976)

- Relief pitcher
- Born: February 17, 1976 (age 50); Fort Polk North, Louisiana, U.S.
- Batted: Right Threw: Right

MLB debut
- April 5, 1999, for the Cincinnati Reds

Last MLB appearance
- June 29, 2007, for the Baltimore Orioles

MLB statistics
- Win–loss record: 28–28
- Earned run average: 3.36
- Strikeouts: 510
- Saves: 55
- Stats at Baseball Reference

Teams
- Cincinnati Reds (1999–2003); Boston Red Sox (2003–2004); Chicago Cubs (2005–2006); San Diego Padres (2006); Baltimore Orioles (2007)

Career highlights and awards
- All-Star (1999); NL Rookie of the Year (1999)

Scott Ryan Williamson (born February 17, 1976) is an American former Major League Baseball (MLB) right-handed relief pitcher who played for the Cincinnati Reds (1999–2003), Boston Red Sox (2003–2004), Chicago Cubs (2005–2006), San Diego Padres (2006), and Baltimore Orioles (2007).

== Amateur career ==
Williamson attended Friendswood High School in Friendswood, Texas. In his senior year he posted a 0.68 ERA and was named district MVP. In college, Williamson played for first Tulane University and then Oklahoma State University. In 1996, he played collegiate summer baseball for the Chatham A's of the Cape Cod Baseball League. With Oklahoma State, he earned Big 12 first-team honors during the 1996-1997 school year. Williamson entered the draft after the season was over and was selected by the Cincinnati Reds in the 9th round, 276th pick overall.

== Professional career ==
=== Cincinnati Reds ===
Cincinnati assigned Williamson their rookie affiliate, the Billings Mustangs of the Pioneer League. Starting for Billings, Williamson went 8–2 with a 1.78 ERA, the best in the league that year. For 1998, Cincinnati promoted Williamson to the Double-A Chattanooga Lookouts of the Southern League, bypassing Single-A altogether. In his first start for the Lookouts, Williamson faced Atlanta Braves veteran John Smoltz, down with the Greenville Braves on a rehabilitation assignment. Williamson held his own, giving up two runs in six innings in a 6–5 loss. Mark Berry, Lookouts manager, praised Williamson's performance: "I was highly impressed...I expected him to be more erratic because of Smoltz, the big crowd and the whole situation. It's something he can build on." Williamson would start just eighteen games for the Lookouts that year after battling injuries, but at the end of the season Cincinnati promoted him to the Triple-A Indianapolis Indians. Cincinnati planned to call Williamson up in September, but he "stretched a tendon in the middle finger of his pitching hand" during a game for Indianapolis that ended his season.

Cincinnati invited Williamson to spring training in 1999, where the combination of an impressive performance and injuries to key members of the pitching staff, including Denny Neagle and Stan Belinda, led to Williamson making the major league club despite having made just five appearances at the Triple-A level and never being on the 40-man roster. Williamson made his major league debut in relief on April 5, 1999. In his rookie season with Cincinnati, Williamson went 12–7 with 107 strikeouts, a 2.41 earned run average and 19 saves; he made the All-Star team, and earned Rookie of the Year honors. Williamson was the first Reds player to be so honored since Chris Sabo in 1988.

During the 1999-2000 off-season, Williamson's name came up several times in trade talks with the Seattle Mariners, who were looking to deal Ken Griffey Jr., but in the end Williamson remained with Cincinnati. Williamson returned for the 2000 season but was bedeviled by injuries, including two broken toes in mid-September. He made fewer appearances than in 1999 but pitched more innings, due in part to joining the starting rotation after the All-Star break.

After a lackluster spring training, Cincinnati returned Williamson to the bullpen, who would make just two appearances before going on the disabled list with a torn ligament in his shoulder. After consultation with orthopedic surgeon James Andrews, Williamson underwent Tommy John surgery, ending his season. Cincinnati general manager Jim Bowden called it "Devastating, just devastating." Williamson returned to the bullpen for the 2002 season and went 3–4 with a 2.92 ERA. For 2003, Williamson took over as closer and saved 21 games in 43 appearances. On July 31, 2003, Cincinnati traded Williamson to the Boston Red Sox for Phil Dumatrait, Tyler Pelland and cash. The move was part of a fire sale instigated by Cincinnati management after Bowden and manager Bob Boone were fired.

=== Boston Red Sox ===
The New York Yankees had also been interested in Williamson; that Boston acquired him from Cincinnati was widely touted as a coup for Boston general manager Theo Epstein. USA Today sportswriter Hal Bodley placed the Williamson trade in the context of Red Sox-Yankees rivalry:

The Sauerbeck-Williamson deals give the Red Sox and Epstein a measure of revenge. They were stung last winter when the Yankees outbid them in a bitter battle for Cuban pitcher Jose Contreras.

The mid-season arrival of Williamson, along with Scott Sauerbeck, Jeff Suppan and Byung Hyun Kim was expected to boost an already strong Boston team to the 2003 World Series.

Williamson's tenure with Boston was a troubled one: his ERA with the team was 6.20 and he pitched just 20 innings in 24 appearances. In mid-September he underwent an MRI but the result was negative. As Boston entered the playoffs he shared closer duties with Mike Timlin. In the American League Championship series against New York, Williamson earned saves in Games 1, 4 and 6. Nevertheless, manager Grady Little left a tiring Pedro Martínez in the 8th inning of Game 7 with Boston up 5–2. Martinez gave up three runs and New York would eventually win in the 11th inning 6-5. Critics maintain that Little should have pulled Martinez in favor of Williamson or Timlin, but that their mixed record during the regular season led Little to stay with the veteran Martinez.

Williamson returned to Boston in 2004 as a middle reliever and got off to a strong start (1.69 ERA in 14 appearances) before elbow tendinitis placed him on the disabled list again in late May. Williamson returned in mid-June, but never felt completely healthy and went back on the DL at the beginning of July with a nerve impingement in his right forearm. The return to the DL was not without controversy: Williamson, feeling pain in a game against the Yankees (which the Red Sox would go on to lose), took himself out of the game. What happened next is a matter of dispute. Contemporary media accounts claim that Boston veteran starting pitcher Curt Schilling confronted Williamson and "questioned [Williamson's] manhood." Schilling would later downplay the incident, acknowledging that he and Williamson "had words" but that Schilling never doubted that Williamson was injured. Williamson indicated that he and Schilling never patched things up and said that "Unfortunately, it happened. He's got his opinion, but it wasn't right."

In August Boston placed Williamson on the 60-day disabled list as word spread that he might undergo a second Tommy John surgery, which would end the 2004 season and likely preclude any activity in 2005 as well. Defying predictions, Williamson returned in September and finished the season with a 1.26 ERA in 28 appearances. However, he was left off the post-season roster and underwent surgery as Boston won the 2004 World Series. Williamson filed for free agency at the end of the season, and departed the organization after Boston declined to offer arbitration.

=== Chicago Cubs ===
At the start of 2005 the Chicago Cubs signed Williamson to a minor league contract and added him to their 40-man roster, but he almost immediately went on the 60-day disabled list: in the end Williamson had undergone the second Tommy John surgery and was not yet recovered. Williamson returned to the team in August but struggled with his velocity. Sportswriters wondered at the wisdom of coming back in less than 12 months without the benefit of spring training. Williamson himself said that he was "trying to find my rhythm and it's hard to do that at the big-league level." Williamson eventually appeared in 17 games; his ERA, 8.68 in the beginning of September, dropped to 5.65 by the end of the season. Showing its confidence in Williamson, Chicago exercised its option to bring him back for another season.

Williamson made the 2006 team as a middle reliever, losing the closer's job to Ryan Dempster. Williamson had expressed a willingness to be traded if it meant taking over the closer's job for the new team. In early June, after making 23 appearances with an ERA over 4, Williamson went back on the disabled list with tendinitis. Williamson returned at the end of June and pitched in eight more games, but on July 22 Chicago traded him to the San Diego Padres for minor League pitchers Fabian Angulo and Joel Santo.

=== San Diego Padres ===
Williamson joined a San Diego team in first place in the National League West division, a prospect which cheered him: "Going from second-to-last to first place, that's always exciting." In an interview with the Galveston County Daily News, Williamson also expressed disappointment at the way Chicago manager Dusty Baker had used him and revealed that he had considered retiring altogether. Now with San Diego, Williamson said that he was "having a lot of fun here, and I'm back to being myself, laughing and joking." Just days after that interview was published, Williamson made his last appearance for San Diego: an MRI revealed a bone chip in his elbow. Williamson returned to the DL and sat out the rest of the season. San Diego released Williamson on October 12.

=== Baltimore Orioles ===
In late November 2006 the Baltimore Orioles signed Williamson to a one-year contract. After six appearances and an ERA of 1.60, Williamson went on the disabled list with tightness in his right triceps tendon. Williamson returned in June and appeared in ten more games, but lingering questions about his health and a desire on the part of Baltimore's management to promote younger players led to him being designated for assignment on July 4. In sixteen games Williamson was 1–0 with a 4.40 ERA. Williamson cleared waivers and was released.

=== Around the minors ===
The New York Yankees signed Williamson to a minor league contract on July 22. He was released on August 5 after going 0–1 with a 9.82 ERA in 4 games with the Triple-A Scranton Wilkes-Barre Yankees. In early February 2008, Williamson signed a one-year minor league contract with the San Francisco Giants. He would have made $700,000 if he had made the Giants major league roster. After posting a 13.50 ERA with the Giants in spring training, Williamson was released on March 5, 2008. Williamson was signed to a minor league contract by the Atlanta Braves in April. They released him in early June.

On June 15, 2008, the Seattle Mariners signed him to a minor league contract. After joining the Triple-A Tacoma Rainiers and his third organization that year, Williamson remarked that "This year has been kind of a crazy year for me...It's kind of frustrating, but it feels good to go out and compete." but he was released in late June after just three appearances.

On January 24, 2009, Williamson signed a minor league deal with the Detroit Tigers, who were looking for middle relievers after a disappointing 2008 season. In the end Williamson lost out to newcomer Ryan Perry and was sent down to the Triple-A Toledo Mud Hens. Detroit manager Jim Leyland praised Williamson's experience: "I think Scott Williamson has an excellent chance...You're talking about a pretty big-time Major League pitcher at one time." Once in Toledo, however, Williamson had difficulties making a consistent outing and his ERA climbed steadily. On April 26, 2009, Toledo released Williamson to make room for Eddie Bonine, ending Williamson's comeback attempt within the Detroit Tigers organization.

On August 2, 2010, Scott Williamson agreed to pitch for the Somerset Patriots.

== Coaching career ==
Scott Williamson currently is a private pitching instructor.
