= César Crespo =

Puerto Rican baseball player (born 1979)

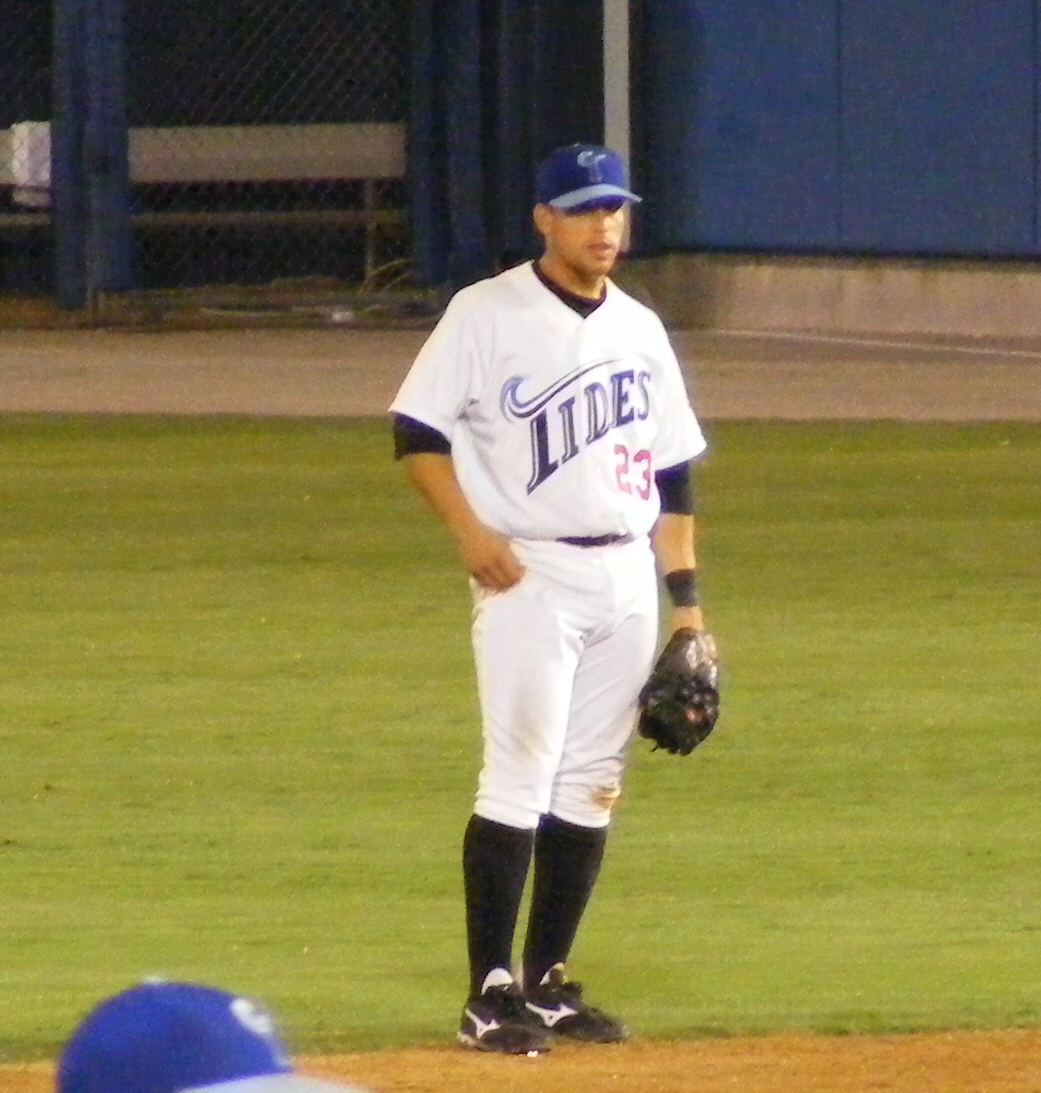
- César Crespo in a 2007 game as a member of the Norfolk Tides
- Utility player
- Born: May 23, 1979 (age 45); Río Piedras, Puerto Rico
- Batted: Switch Threw: Right

MLB debut
- May 29, 2001, for the San Diego Padres

Last MLB appearance
- July 1, 2004, for the Boston Red Sox

MLB statistics
- Batting average: .192
- Home runs: 4
- Runs batted in: 14
- Stats at Baseball Reference

Teams
- San Diego Padres (2001–2002); Boston Red Sox (2004)

César Antonio Crespo (born May 23, 1979) is a Puerto Rican former second baseman who last played in the Baltimore Orioles organization. Listed at 5'11, 170 lb., Crespo was a switch-hitter and throws right-handed. He is the younger brother of Felipe Crespo.

== Career ==
Crespo is a 10-year minor league veteran who had brief stints in Major League Baseball with the San Diego Padres (2001–02) and Boston Red Sox (2004). His most productive season came in 2001 with San Diego, when he hit .209 with four home runs (all coming from the left side of the plate) and 12 RBI in 55 games, all career-highs. On June 7 of that year, Crespo and his brother Felipe homered in the same game, joining a select club of major league brothers who have accomplished the same honor. He also won a World Series ring as a member of the 2004 Boston Red Sox (he did not play in the second half of the season, the 2004 playoffs, or the 2004 World Series).

In 132 major league games, Crespo hit .192 (50-for-261) with four home runs and 14 RBI, including 38 runs, 10 doubles, one triple, and 11 stolen bases.

Crespo spent 2007 with the Norfolk Tides of the International League. In 2008, Cesar played with the Puerto Rico Double A (AA) baseball league, for the "Mulos Del Valenciano" de Juncos.

== See also ==
- List of Major League Baseball players from Puerto Rico
