= Colter Bean =

American baseball player (born 1977)

- Pitcher
- Born: January 16, 1977 (age 49); Anniston, Alabama, U.S.
- Batted: Right Threw: Right

MLB debut
- April 26, 2005, for the New York Yankees

Last MLB appearance
- May 4, 2007, for the New York Yankees

MLB statistics
- Win–loss record: 0–1
- Earned run average: 9.00
- Strikeouts: 5
- Stats at Baseball Reference

Teams
- New York Yankees (2005–2007)

Randall Colter Bean (born January 16, 1977) is an American former professional relief pitcher. He played in Major League Baseball for the New York Yankees.

== Career ==
Bean attended Vestavia Hills High School in Birmingham before attending Auburn University. Bean played in the College World Series and was named All-SEC second team in 2000. Bean still holds the Auburn team record with 108 games pitched and 106 games relieved in his NCAA career.

Following his college graduation, the Yankees signed Bean as an undrafted free agent on May 31, 2000. The Boston Red Sox selected Bean in the Rule 5 draft on December 13, 2003, before returning his rights to the Yankees in the off-season on March 17, 2004. Bean made his major league debut with the Yankees April 26, 2005, his only appearance with the Yankees that season. In 2006, Bean started the season on the Columbus Clippers but was called up on May 20.

On August 15, 2006, Bean apparently tied the Clippers' team record for career games pitched, when he made his 212th career appearance for Columbus as the starter in a 2–1 win. The previous record had been credited to Bumpus Jones, a 19th-century player. However, modern research indicates that Jones's actual games pitched total may have been closer to 150, in which case Bean would have already held the record for some time. The next-highest total behind Bean and Jones is George McQuillan, currently credited with 204.

Bean elected to become a six-year minor league free agent after the 2007 season. He signed a minor league contract with the Atlanta Braves organization on February 8, 2008, but after being released by the Braves, signed with Olmecas de Tabasco. On May 8, he signed a minor league deal with the Tampa Bay Rays and became a free agent at the end of the season.

== See also ==
- Rule 5 draft results
