= Jason Shiell =

American baseball player (born 1976)

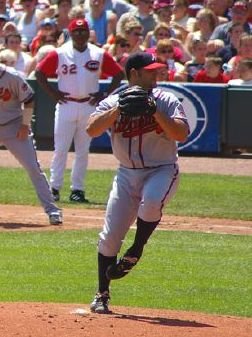
- Shiell with the Atlanta Braves in 2006
- Pitcher
- Born: October 19, 1976 (age 50); Savannah, Georgia, U.S.
- Batted: Right Threw: Right

MLB debut
- September 8, 2002, for the San Diego Padres

Last MLB appearance
- August 5, 2006, for the Atlanta Braves

MLB statistics
- Win–loss record: 2–2
- Earned run average: 6.92
- Strikeouts: 38
- Stats at Baseball Reference

Teams
- San Diego Padres (2002); Boston Red Sox (2003); Atlanta Braves (2006)

Jason Alexander Shiell (born October 19, 1976) is an American former professional baseball pitcher. He played in Major League Baseball (MLB) for the San Diego Padres, Boston Red Sox and Atlanta Braves. Listed at 6 feet 0 inches (1.83 m) and 180 pounds (82 kg), he threw and batted right-handed.

== Career ==
Shiell attended Windsor Forest High School in Savannah, Georgia. He was selected by the Atlanta Braves in the 48th round of the 1995 MLB draft. He pitched in the Braves' farm system from 1995 through 1999, reaching the Class A-Advanced level. In December 1999, he was part of a multi-player trade with the San Diego Padres. He pitched in the minor leagues for the Padres in 2000 and 2001, reaching the Double-A level. In 2002, pitched at the Triple-A level, and was a late-season call-up to the Padres, appearing in three MLB games while allowing four runs in 1 1/3 innings (27.00 ERA).

In October 2002, Shiell was claimed off of waivers by the Boston Red Sox. In 2003, he pitched for Boston at the Triple-A level, and made 17 MLB appearances (2–0 record with 4.63 ERA in 23 1/3 innings). One highlight of his MLB career came on April 27, 2003, when he picked up his only MLB save during an extra innings win over the Angels. He underwent Tommy John surgery in May 2004, and became a free agent in October 2004. As a result of the surgery, he did not pitch professionally in 2004 or 2005.

In 2006, he resumed pitching professionally with the Somerset Patriots of the Atlantic League of Professional Baseball, until his contract was purchased by the Atlanta Braves in June 2006. He pitched in Triple-A for Atlanta, and made four MLB appearances with the Braves (0–2 with 8.62 ERA in 15 2/3 innings). He again became a free agent in October 2006.

Shiell spent the 2007 season with the Kansas City Royals organization, at the Double-A and Triple-A levels. His final professional season was 2008, when he pitched in the Milwaukee Brewers organization, again at the Double-A and Triple-A levels. He was released by Milwaukee on August 14, 2008.

Overall, Shiell appeared in 24 MLB games, compiling a 2–2 record with 6.92 ERA in 40 1/3 innings pitched. He played in 294 minor league games, where he was 43–44 with 3.85 ERA in 786 1/3 innings.
