= Mark Malaska =

American baseball player (born 1978)

- Relief pitcher
- Born: January 17, 1978 (age 48); Youngstown, Ohio
- Batted: Left Threw: Left

MLB debut
- July 17, 2003, for the Tampa Bay Devil Rays

Last MLB appearance
- July 24, 2004, for the Boston Red Sox

MLB statistics
- Win–loss record: 3-2
- Earned run average: 3.75
- Strikeouts: 29
- Stats at Baseball Reference

Teams
- Tampa Bay Devil Rays (2003); Boston Red Sox (2004)

Dennis Mark Malaska (born January 17, 1978) is an American former professional baseball pitcher who played for the Tampa Bay Devil Rays in 2003 and the Boston Red Sox in 2004 in Major League Baseball. Malaska grew up on the south side of Youngstown, Ohio. He attended Cardinal Mooney High School where he earned three varsity letters in both baseball and basketball, earned All-Steel Valley honors in both sports, and was later inducted into the school's athletic Hall of Fame. Malaska was offered several athletic scholarships in both sports as well as several academic scholarships, but chose to continue his baseball career at The University of Akron.

Malaska attended the University of Akron (1997–2000), where he set and still holds Akron single-game records for runs (5), doubles (3), and RBIs (10). He also garnered back-to-back Best Pro Prospect honors in the New England Collegiate Baseball League (1998 and 1999) while playing center field for the Danbury Westerners (Danbury, Connecticut.) He would later be inducted into the New England Collegiate Baseball League Hall of Fame in 2010 as part of its inaugural class and have his number retired by the Westerners in 2014. In the spring of 2000, Malaska was developed into a relief pitcher at the University of Akron because of the team's need for a closer. He finished the 2000 NCAA season with a .326 batting average and a 1.13 ERA earning him All Mid-American Conference First Team honors. He was drafted in the 8th round of the 2000 MLB draft by the Tampa Bay Devil Rays. A year after being drafted, he tied for the organizational lead in strikeouts, and in 2002 led the organization in complete games. He made his Major League debut with the Tampa Bay Devil Rays in 2003 and posted a 2.81 ERA in 22 appearances out of the bullpen, becoming only the third player in University of Akron history to reach the major leagues. He was acquired off waivers by the Boston Red Sox after the 2003 season and received a World Series ring as a member of the 2004 Boston Red Sox after 19 appearances out of their bullpen.

Mark retired abruptly from baseball during spring training of 2006 and now resides in Youngstown, Ohio.

== Honors and awards ==
- 1998 New England Collegiate Baseball League All Star
- 1998 New England Collegiate Baseball League Best Pro Prospect
- 1999 New England Collegiate Baseball League All Star
- 1999 New England Collegiate Baseball League All Star Game MVP
- 1999 New England Collegiate Baseball League Best Pro Prospect
- 2000 All Mid-American Conference First Team
- 2002 Baseball America Tampa Bay Devil Rays #29 Rated Prospect
- 2002 California League All Star
- 2003 Baseball America Boston Red Sox #25 Rated Prospect
- World Series Champion (2004)
- 2010 New England Collegiate Baseball League Hall of Fame Inductee
