= Andy Dominique =

American baseball player (born 1975)

- Catcher / First baseman
- Born: October 30, 1975 (age 49); Tarzana, California, U.S.
- Batted: Right Threw: Right

MLB debut
- May 25, 2004, for the Boston Red Sox

Last MLB appearance
- May 22, 2005, for the Toronto Blue Jays

MLB statistics
- Batting average: .154
- Home runs: 0
- Runs batted in: 1
- Stats at Baseball Reference

Teams
- Boston Red Sox (2004); Toronto Blue Jays (2005)

Andrew John Dominique (born October 30, 1975) is an American former professional baseball first baseman and catcher. He played in Major League Baseball (MLB) in parts of the 2004 and 2005 seasons. Listed at 6 feet 0 inches (1.83 m) and 220 pounds (100 kg), he batted and threw right-handed. He attended Bishop Alemany High School.

== Career ==
Primarily a third baseman in college at the University of Nevada, Dominique made the Big West Conference All-Star baseball team in 1996 and 1997. He hit 30 home runs with 97 RBIs and a .788 slugging percentage in 1997 to set single-season records and gain Big West player of the year honors. In 1995, Dominique played collegiate summer baseball for the Kenosha Kroakers of the Northwoods League. Dominique was selected by the Philadelphia Phillies in the 1997 MLB draft.

Dominique began his professional career in 1997 and spent six seasons in the Philadelphia farm system as a corner infielder and catcher before being traded to the Boston Red Sox organization in June 2002.

Dominique played in MLB in 2004 with Boston, hitting .182 in seven games, and also made two appearances with the Toronto Blue Jays in 2005. He last play professionally in the 2005 season. On December 3, 2005, he signed with the Seattle Mariners, but did not play in their organization.

In parts of two seasons in the major leagues, Dominique was a .154 hitter (2-for-13) with one RBI in nine games. In 927 minor league games, he hit .270 (895-for-3318) with 122 home runs and 569 RBIs.

Dominique later became a hitting instructor in Reno, Nevada, and head baseball coach at Earl Wooster High School in Reno.
