= Edwin Almonte =

Dominican baseball player (born 1976)

- Pitcher
- Born: December 17, 1976 (age 48); Santiago, Dominican Republic
- Batted: Right Threw: Right

MLB debut
- July 7, 2003, for the New York Mets

Last MLB appearance
- September 10, 2003, for the New York Mets

MLB statistics
- Win–loss record: 0–0
- Earned run average: 11.12
- Strikeouts: 7
- Stats at Baseball Reference

Teams
- New York Mets (2003)

Edwin Almonte (born December 17, 1976) is a Dominican former pitcher, who last played for the independent Schaumburg Flyers in 2009. He is 6'3", weighs 220 lbs, and bats and throws right-handed. He attended Seward Park High School in New York and Saint Francis College in Brooklyn.

== Baseball career ==
Almonte was drafted in the 26th round of the 1998 draft by the Chicago White Sox. He spent the next five years in the White Sox organization, reaching as high as the Triple-A Charlotte Knights, before joining the New York Mets in 2003 as part of a trade that sent him to the Mets with Andrew Salvo and Royce Ring; in return, the White Sox got future Hall of Famer Roberto Alomar. In 12 games with the Mets in 2003, Almonte had an 11.12 ERA, 5 walks, and 7 strikeouts.

In December 2003, Almonte signed with the Boston Red Sox, and spent the year with the Triple-A Pawtucket Red Sox. While he was there, he had a record of 5–6, with a 5.50 ERA. He walked 22 and struck out 37. He left the Red Sox and became a free agent in March 2004. He signed a minor league contract with the Detroit Tigers on February 16, 2005, and became a free agent at the end of the season.

Almonte had a career resurgence in 2007, making 44 appearances for the Newark Bears of the independent Atlantic League. He would make 42 appearances for the Bears in 2008, and made 19 starts for the Schaumburg Flyers of the Northern League in 2009, going 6–10.
