= Phil Seibel =

American baseball player (born 1979)

- Pitcher
- Born: January 28, 1979 (age 47); Louisville, Kentucky, U.S.
- Batted: Left Threw: Left

MLB debut
- April 15, 2004, for the Boston Red Sox

Last MLB appearance
- April 18, 2004, for the Boston Red Sox

MLB statistics
- Win–loss record: 0–0
- Earned run average: 0.00
- Strikeouts: 1
- Stats at Baseball Reference

Teams
- Boston Red Sox (2004)

Philip Matthew Seibel (born January 28, 1979) is an American former Major League Baseball left-handed pitcher.

== Biography ==
Seibel attended the University of Texas, where he pitched for the Texas Longhorns baseball team from 1998 to 2000. He also pitched for Team USA in 1999.

His professional career began in 2000 when he was drafted in the 8th round by the Montreal Expos. In April 2002 he was traded along with two other players to the New York Mets for Bruce Chen, Dicky Gonzalez, Luis Figueroa, and a player to be named later (Saul Rivera). Following the 2003 season, Seibel was placed on waivers by the Mets and picked up by the Boston Red Sox.

Seibel made his major league debut on April 15, 2004, and faced just two batters. The first batter reached on an error, and the second batter walked. He also pitched on April 18, 2004, against the New York Yankees, where he pitched 3 2/3 scoreless, hitless innings, and received a no-decision in the Red Sox loss. He walked five and struck out one. Seibel received a World Series ring for his work in April.

Seibel sat out the entire 2005 season recovering from Tommy John surgery, then rejoined the Red Sox for their 2006 spring training in Florida as a non-roster invitee, he was shipped back to the minors on March 17. He spent the 2006 season in the minors with Greenville, Portland and Pawtucket, going 6–3 with a 1.24 ERA for the 3 teams. Seibel was traded to the Los Angeles Angels of Anaheim for pitcher Brendan Donnelly on December 15, 2006.

In 2008, he was an assistant in the scouting department for the Arizona Diamondbacks. In 2009, Phil and his wife Charity were married in a ceremony in Playa Del Carmen, Mexico. Since 2009, he left baseball and took a role with his father's insurance agency, becoming president of the company in 2021.
