= Scott Sauerbeck =

American baseball player (1971–2025)

- Pitcher
- Born: November 9, 1971; Cincinnati, Ohio, U.S.
- Died: February 18, 2025 (aged 53); Palmetto, Florida, U.S.
- Batted: Right Threw: Left

MLB debut
- April 5, 1999, for the Pittsburgh Pirates

Last MLB appearance
- September 23, 2006, for the Oakland Athletics

MLB statistics
- Win–loss record: 20–17
- Earned run average: 3.82
- Strikeouts: 389
- Stats at Baseball Reference

Teams
- Pittsburgh Pirates (1999–2003); Boston Red Sox (2003); Cleveland Indians (2005–2006); Oakland Athletics (2006)

Scott William Sauerbeck (November 9, 1971 – February 18, 2025) was an American professional baseball left-handed relief pitcher. He played in Major League Baseball (MLB) from 1999 to 2006 for the Pittsburgh Pirates, Boston Red Sox, Cleveland Indians, and Oakland Athletics.

== Early career ==
Sauerbeck attended Northwest High School in Cincinnati, and played baseball, basketball and soccer, graduating in 1990.

He called himself "the curveball flipping freak."

After attending Miami University in Oxford, Ohio, Sauerbeck was drafted by the New York Mets in the 23rd round of the 1994 amateur draft.

== Professional career ==
=== New York Mets ===
Sauerbeck was drafted by the New York Mets in the 23rd round, with the 624th overall selection, of the 1994 Major League Baseball draft. He made his professional debut with the Low-A Pittsfield Mets. Sauerbeck split the 1995 season between the Single-A Capital City Bombers and High-A St. Lucie Mets. In 39 appearances for the two affiliates, he compiled an aggregate 5–5 record and 2.72 ERA with 58 strikeouts across 59 2/3 innings pitched.

Sauerbeck split the 1996 campaign between St. Lucie and the Double-A Binghamton Mets, accumulating a 9–9 record and 2.65 ERA with 92 strikeouts in 146 innings pitched across 25 games (24 starts). He returned to Binghamton in 1997, also making one appearance for the Triple-A Norfolk Tides, and compiled an 8–9 record and 4.93 ERA with 88 strikeouts in 131 1/3 innings pitched across 27 games (20 starts). Sauerbeck spent the entirety of the 1998 season with Triple-A Norfolk. In 27 starts for the Tides, he registered a 7–13 record and 3.93 ERA with a career-high 119 strikeouts across 160 1/3 innings pitched.

=== Pittsburgh Pirates ===
On December 14, 1998, Sauerbeck was drafted by the Pittsburgh Pirates in the Rule 5 draft. Sauerbeck pitched in 65 games for the Pirates during his rookie campaign, compiling a 4–1 record and 2.00 ERA with 55 strikeouts over 67 2/3 innings of work. He made 75 appearances out of the bullpen for Pittsburgh in 2000, logging a 5–4 record and 4.04 ERA with 83 strikeouts across 75 2/3 innings pitched.

Sauerbeck pitched in 70 contests for Pittsburgh in 2001, compiling a 2–2 record and 5.60 ERA with 79 strikeouts and 2 saves across 62 2/3 innings pitched. In 2002, he made 78 appearances for the team, registering a 5–4 record and 2.30 ERA with 70 strikeouts across 62 2/3 innings pitched. Sauerbeck made 53 appearances for Pittsburgh during the 2003 campaign, posting a 3–4 record and 4.05 ERA with 32 strikeouts over 40 innings of work.

=== Boston Red Sox ===
On July 22, 2003, Sauerbeck and pitcher Mike González were traded to the Boston Red Sox in exchange for Brandon Lyon and Anastacio Martínez, but the Pirates backed out of the deal after discovering an injury to Lyon. However, the Pirates and Red Sox worked out another trade that sent Sauerbeck and Jeff Suppan to Boston in exchange for infielder Freddy Sanchez. With Boston, he pitched in 26 games and made one postseason appearance, struggling a 6.48 ERA with 18 strikeouts across 16 2/3 innings pitched.

=== Cleveland Indians ===
On April 12, 2004, Sauerbeck signed with the Cleveland Indians, but missed the 2004 season due to an injury. He returned to action in 2005, making 58 appearances and pitching to a 4.04 ERA with 35 strikeouts across 35 2/3 innings pitched.

Sauerbeck made 24 appearances for the Indians to begin the 2006 campaign, but struggled to a 6.23 ERA with 11 strikeouts over 13 innings pitched. On June 9, 2006, Sauerbeck was designated for assignment by the Indians due to poor performance on the field and a recent arrest. He was released on June 14.

=== Oakland Athletics ===
On June 19, 2006, Sauerbeck signed a one-year, major league contract with the Oakland Athletics. In 22 appearances for Oakland, he recorded a 3.65 ERA with 6 strikeouts across 12 1/3 innings pitched. Sauerbeck was released by the Athletics organization on October 10.

=== Houston Astros ===
On February 2, 2007, Sauerbeck signed a minor league contract with the Houston Astros. In 18 appearances for the Triple-A Round Rock Express, he posted a 3.93 ERA with 22 strikeouts across 18 1/3 innings pitched. Sauerbeck was released by the Astros organization on June 19.

=== Toronto Blue Jays ===
On June 25, 2007, Sauerbeck signed a minor league contract with the Toronto Blue Jays organization. He spent the remainder of the year with the High-A Dunedin Blue Jays and Triple-A Syracuse Chiefs, accumulating a 2–1 record and 5.66 ERA with 32 strikeouts across 30 2/3 innings pitched. Sauerbeck elected free agency on October 29.

=== Cincinnati Reds ===
On February 1, 2008, Sauerbeck signed a minor league contract with the Cincinnati Reds that included an invitation to spring training. In 4 appearances for the Triple-A Louisville Bats, he struggled to a 9.00 ERA with 5 strikeouts over 4 innings of work. Sauerbeck was released by the Reds organization on May 6.

=== Chicago White Sox ===
On May 28, 2008, Sauerbeck signed a minor league contract with the Chicago White Sox and was assigned to their Triple-A affiliate, the Charlotte Knights. Sauerbeck's final minor league game was August 29, pitching a scoreless inning with two strikeouts against the Durham Bulls. He announced his retirement following the game. With the Knights, Scott compiled a 1–2 record with a 4.37 ERA and 26 strikeouts in 37 games.

== Personal life ==
On May 30, 2006, Sauerbeck was arrested and charged with obstructing official business and permitting someone intoxicated to drive his vehicle.

== Death ==
Sauerbeck died from complications from the influenza A virus with hypertensive heart disease a contributing factor, on February 18, 2025, at the age of 53.
