= Jamie Brown (baseball) =

American baseball player (born 1977)

- Pitcher
- Born: March 31, 1977 (age 48); Meridian, Mississippi
- Batted: Right Threw: Right

Professional debut
- MLB: May 20, 2004, for the Boston Red Sox
- NPB: April 3, 2005, for the Hanshin Tigers
- KBO: April 12, 2006, for the Samsung Lions

Last appearance
- MLB: May 31, 2004, for the Boston Red Sox
- NPB: June 4, 2005, for the Hanshin Tigers
- KBO: May 9, 2008, for the LG Twins

MLB statistics
- Win–loss record: 0–0
- Earned run average: 5.87
- Strikeouts: 6

NPB statistics
- Win–loss record: 4–1
- Earned run average: 5.18
- Strikeouts: 24

KBO statistics
- Win–loss record: 24–22
- Earned run average: 3.52
- Strikeouts: 15
- Stats at Baseball Reference

Teams
- Boston Red Sox (2004); Hanshin Tigers (2005); Samsung Lions (2006–2007); LG Twins (2008)

Jamie Monroe Brown (born March 31, 1977) is a relief pitcher formerly in Major League Baseball. He bats and throws right-handed.

Brown played briefly for the Boston Red Sox in the 2004 season. In four games pitched, he posted a 5.87 ERA with six strikeouts and four walks in 7-1/3 innings without a decision.

Following his major league career, Brown has played for the Hanshin Tigers (2005), Samsung Lions (2006–2007), and LG Twins (2008).
