= Adam Hyzdu =

American baseball player (born 1971)

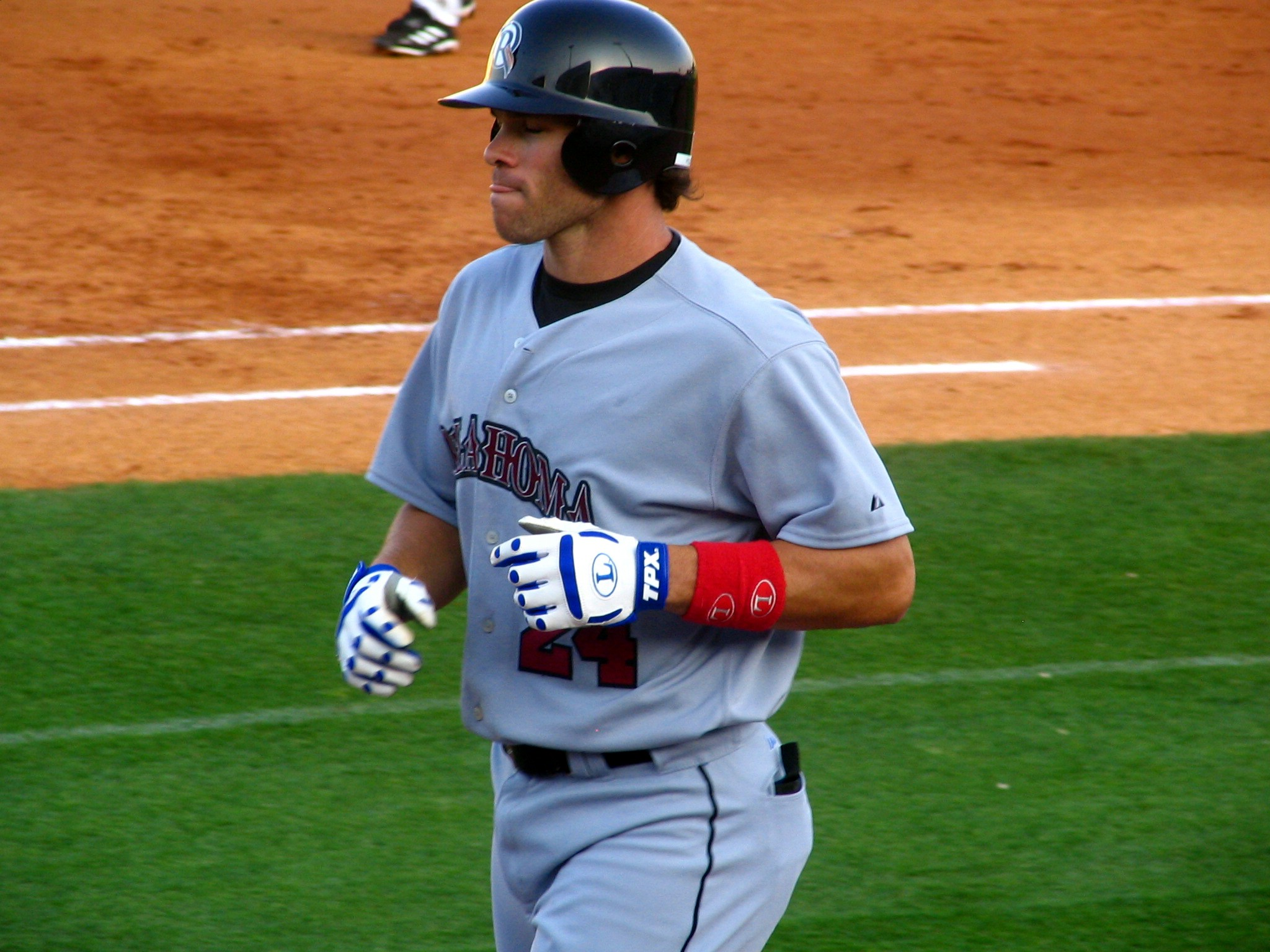
- Outfielder
- Born: December 6, 1971 (age 54); San Jose, California, U.S.
- Batted: Right Threw: Right

MLB debut
- September 8, 2000, for the Pittsburgh Pirates

Last MLB appearance
- April 26, 2006, for the Texas Rangers

MLB statistics
- Batting average: .229
- Home runs: 19
- Runs batted in: 61
- Stats at Baseball Reference

Teams
- Pittsburgh Pirates (2000–2003); Boston Red Sox (2004–2005); San Diego Padres (2005); Texas Rangers (2006); Fukuoka SoftBank Hawks (2007)

Adam Davis Hyzdu (/ˈhɪzduː/; born December 6, 1971) is an American former professional baseball outfielder who played in Major League Baseball (MLB) and Nippon Professional Baseball (NPB). He batted and threw right-handed.

In Major League Baseball, he played for the Pittsburgh Pirates (2000–2003), Boston Red Sox (2004 and 2005), San Diego Padres (2005), and Texas Rangers (2006).

== Biography ==
Hyzdu attended Moeller High School in Cincinnati, where he broke Ken Griffey Jr.'s home run record (22) and led his team to win the state championship in 1989.

Hyzdu was drafted by the San Francisco Giants in the first round of the 1990 Major League Baseball draft, but never reached the major leagues as a Giant. Hyzdu is well known for his accomplishments in the minor leagues. During his two seasons with the Altoona Curve, he broke many franchise records, many of which still stand today. He was an Eastern League All-Star both seasons and had his number 16 retired by the club.

Hyzdu was named "NL Player of the Week" the Week for July 15–21, 2002 while playing outfield for the Pittsburgh Pirates. He batted .588 with three homers and a league-leading 11 RBI. In fives games during the week, Hyzdu was 10-for-17, scored six runs, and compiled a slugging percentage of 1.118 and an on-base percentage of .611.

On July 19 versus St. Louis, he hit his first career grand slam. The following day, Hyzdu established career-highs with four hits, including a pair of three-run homers, and seven runs batted in.

In a seven-season major league career, Hyzdu was a .229 hitter with 19 home runs and 61 RBI in 221 games.

With the Red Sox in 2004, Hyzdu batted .300 (3 for 10) with a home run, two RBI, and 2 doubles in 17 games. In 129 games with Pawtucket, he batted .301 with 29 home runs, 79 RBI, and led the team in walks with 84.

After the 2006 season, he joined the Fukuoka SoftBank Hawks of the Japanese Pacific League with a one-year contract. He batted .272 with 7 home runs in 47 games. After one season in Japan, he failed to get a contract extension and left the Hawks to be a free agent.

== Personal life ==
Hyzdu is married with three children and an active member in his local Christian church, Red Mountain Community Church. His brother Mike Hyzdu played football for Miami University of Ohio from 1985 to 1989 and his brother Marshall Hyzdu played football for Dartmouth College from 1996 to 1999.
