= 2004 New York Yankees season =

Season for the Major League Baseball team the New York Yankees

2004 New York Yankees
- American League East champions
- League: American League
- Division: East
- Ballpark: Yankee Stadium
- City: New York
- Record: 101–61 (.623)
- Divisional place: 1st
- Owners: George Steinbrenner
- General managers: Brian Cashman
- Managers: Joe Torre
- Television: WCBS-TV; YES Network (Michael Kay, Jim Kaat, Ken Singleton, Bobby Murcer, Paul O'Neill, Joe Girardi)
- Radio: WCBS (AM) (John Sterling, Charley Steiner); WADO (Armando Tallavara)

The 2004 New York Yankees season was the 102nd season for the New York Yankees franchise. The Yankees opened the season by playing two games against the Tampa Bay Devil Rays in Japan on March 30, 2004. The team finished with a record of 101–61, finishing 3 games ahead of the Boston Red Sox in the AL East. The 2004 season was the Yankees third straight season of 100+ wins, the first such instance in franchise history. New York was managed by Joe Torre. In the playoffs, the Yankees defeated the Minnesota Twins, 3 games to 1, in the ALDS, before losing to the wild card Boston Red Sox, 4 games to 3, in the ALCS. The 2004 Yankees are notable as the only team in MLB history to lose a 7-game playoff series after taking a 3 games to none lead. This was the fourth straight year in which the Yankees lost to the eventual World Series champions in the postseason. Only the Los Angeles Dodgers (2016–19) have duplicated the same feat.

== Offseason ==
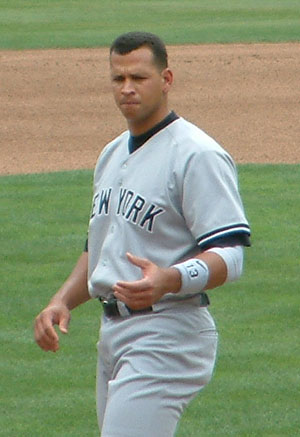
Alex Rodriguez was acquired in a trade with the Texas Rangers in exchange for Alfonso Soriano and Joaquín Árias.

- October 27, 2003: Luis Sojo was released by the New York Yankees.
- December 16, 2003: Nick Johnson was traded by the New York Yankees with Randy Choate and Juan Rivera to the Montreal Expos for Javier Vázquez.
- December 23, 2003: Buddy Carlyle was signed as a free agent with the New York Yankees.
- January 6, 2004: Kenny Lofton signed as a free agent with the New York Yankees.
- February 5, 2004: Mike Lamb was traded by the Texas Rangers to the New York Yankees for Jose Garcia (minors).
- February 16, 2004: The New York Yankees sent Alfonso Soriano and a player to be named later were sent to the Texas Rangers in exchange for Alex Rodriguez. The New York Yankees sent Joaquin Arias (April 23, 2004) to the Texas Rangers to complete the trade.
- March 25, 2004: Mike Lamb was traded by the New York Yankees to the Houston Astros for Juan DeLeon (minors).

Signed Gary Sheffield

== Regular season ==
=== Season summary ===
==== July ====
Derek Jeter dives into stands chasing and catching a pop up in the 12th inning of a 3 to 3 game against the Boston Red Sox, the play was later named the dive.

==== August ====
On August 31 the Yankees had their worst loss in history by run differential, losing 22–0 to the Cleveland Indians.

==== September ====
On September 30 the Yankees clinched their division.

=== Season standings ===
AL East
Team	W	L	Pct.	GB	Home	Road
New York Yankees	101	61	.623	—	57‍–‍24	44‍–‍37
Boston Red Sox	98	64	.605	3	55‍–‍26	43‍–‍38
Baltimore Orioles	78	84	.481	23	38‍–‍43	40‍–‍41
Tampa Bay Devil Rays	70	91	.435	30½	41‍–‍39	29‍–‍52
Toronto Blue Jays	67	94	.416	33½	40‍–‍41	27‍–‍53

=== Record vs. opponents ===
2004 American League record Source: MLB Standings Grid – 2004
Team	ANA	BAL	BOS	CWS	CLE	DET	KC	MIN	NYY	OAK	SEA	TB	TEX	TOR	NL
Anaheim	—	6–3	4–5	5–4	4–5	7–2	7–0	5–4	5–4	10–9	13–7	6–1	9–10	4–5	7–11
Baltimore	3–6	—	10–9	2–4	3–3	6–0	6–3	4–5	5–14	0–7	7–2	11–8	5–2	11–8	5–13
Boston	5–4	9–10	—	4–2	3–4	6–1	4–2	2–4	11–8	8–1	5–4	14–5	4–5	14–5	9–9
Chicago	4–5	4–2	2–4	—	10–9	8–11	13–6	9–10	3–4	2–7	7–2	4–2	6–3	3–4	8–10
Cleveland	5–4	3–3	4–3	9–10	—	9–10	11–8	7–12	2–4	6–3	5–4	3–3	1–8	5–2	10–8
Detroit	2–7	0–6	1–6	11–8	10–9	—	8–11	7–12	4–3	4–5	5–4	3–3	4–5	4–2	9–9
Kansas City	0–7	3–6	2–4	6–13	8–11	11–8	—	7–12	1–5	2–7	2–5	3–6	4–5	3–3	6–12
Minnesota	4–5	5–4	4–2	10–9	12–7	12–7	12–7	—	2–4	2–5	5–4	4–5	5–2	4–2	11–7
New York	4–5	14–5	8–11	4–3	4–2	3–4	5–1	4–2	—	7–2	6–3	15–4	5–4	12–7	10–8
Oakland	9–10	7–0	1–8	7–2	3–6	5–4	7–2	5–2	2–7	—	11–8	7–2	11–9	6–3	10–8
Seattle	7–13	2–7	4–5	2–7	4–5	4–5	5–2	4–5	3–6	8–11	—	2–5	7–12	2–7	9–9
Tampa Bay	1–6	8–11	5–14	2–4	3–3	3–3	6–3	5–4	4–15	2–7	5–2	—	2–7	9–9	15–3
Texas	10–9	2–5	5–4	3–6	8–1	5–4	5–4	2–5	4–5	9–11	12–7	7–2	—	7–2	10–8
Toronto	5–4	8–11	5–14	4–3	2–5	2–4	3–3	2–4	7–12	3–6	7–2	9–9	2–7	—	8–10

=== Notable transactions ===
- June 7, 2004: Phil Hughes was drafted by the New York Yankees in the 1st round (23rd pick) of the 2004 amateur draft. Player signed June 16, 2004.
- July 22, 2004: Donzell McDonald was signed as a free agent with the New York Yankees.
- July 31, 2004: Esteban Loaiza was traded by the Chicago White Sox to the New York Yankees for José Contreras and cash.
- August 3, 2004: John Olerud was signed as a free agent with the New York Yankees.
- August 17, 2004: Shane Spencer signed as a free agent with the New York Yankees.

=== Roster ===
2004 New York Yankees
Roster
Pitchers: 27 Kevin Brown; 52 José Contreras; 43 Jorge De Paula; 36 Tom Gordon; 57 Alex Graman; 57,61 Brad Halsey; 45 Félix Heredia; 26 Orlando Hernández; 31 Steve Karsay; 22 Jon Lieber; 28 Esteban Loaiza; 60 Sam Marsonek; 35 Mike Mussina; 40 C. J. Nitkowski; 46 Donovan Osborne; 61 Juan Padilla; 47 Bret Prinz; 56,57 Scott Proctor; 48 Paul Quantrill; 42 Mariano Rivera; 56 Tanyon Sturtze; 33 Javier Vázquez; 40 Gabe White	Catchers: 17 John Flaherty; 68 Dioner Navarro; 20 Jorge Posada; Infielders: 18 Homer Bush; 41 Miguel Cairo; 29 Tony Clark; 60 Félix Escalona; 25 Jason Giambi; 2 Derek Jeter; 38 Travis Lee; 18 John Olerud; 39 Andy Phillips; 13 Alex Rodriguez; 14 Enrique Wilson	Outfielders: 19 Bubba Crosby; 12 Kenny Lofton; 55 Hideki Matsui; 11 Gary Sheffield; 24 Rubén Sierra; 51 Bernie Williams	Manager: 6 Joe Torre; Coaches: 23 Don Mattingly (hitting); 52 Rich Monteleone (bullpen); 30 Willie Randolph (bench); 53 Luis Sojo (third base); 34 Mel Stottlemyre (pitching); 54 Roy White (first base)

=== Game log ===
Legend
Yankees Win	Yankees Loss	Game postponed

2004 Game Log (101–61) Home: 57–24 Away: 44–37
March (1–1) Home: 0–0 Away: 1–1

#	Date	Opponent	Score	Win	Loss	Save	Location	Attendance	Record
1	March 30	@ Devil Rays	3–8	Zambrano (1–0)	Mussina (0–1)	—	Tokyo Dome	55,000	0–1
2	March 31	@ Devil Rays	12–1	Brown (1–0)	González (0–1)	—	Tokyo Dome	55,000	1–1

April (11–10) Home: 7–5 Away: 4–5

#	Date	Opponent	Score	Win	Loss	Save	Location	Attendance	Record
3	April 6	@ Devil Rays	4–9	Zambrano (2–0)	Mussina (0–2)	—	Tropicana Field	41,755	1–2
4	April 7	@ Devil Rays	3–2	Brown (2–0)	Abbott (0–1)	Rivera (1)	Tropicana Field	31,669	2–2
5	April 8	White Sox	3–1	Vazquez (1–0)	Schoeneweis (0–1)	Rivera (2)	Yankee Stadium	55,290	3–2
6	April 9	White Sox	3–9	Garland (1–0)	Contreras (0–1)	—	Yankee Stadium	45,965	3–3
7	April 10	White Sox	3–7	Buehrle (1–0)	DePaula (0–1)	—	Yankee Stadium	47,911	3–4
8	April 11	White Sox	5–4	Mussina (1–2)	Wright (0–1)	Rivera (3)	Yankee Stadium	37,484	4–4
–	April 13	Devil Rays	Postponed (rain) Rescheduled for September 6						
9	April 14	Devil Rays	5–1	Brown (3–0)	Hendrickson (0–1)	—	Yankee Stadium	37,914	5–4
10	April 16	@ Red Sox	2–6	Wakefield (1–0)	Vazquez (1–1)	—	Fenway Park	35,163	5–5
11	April 17	@ Red Sox	2–5	Schilling (2–0)	Mussina (1–3)	—	Fenway Park	35,023	5–6
12	April 18	@ Red Sox	7–3	Quantrill (1–0)	Lowe (1–1)	—	Fenway Park	35,011	6–6
13	April 19	@ Red Sox	4–5	Timlin (1–1)	Gordon (0–1)	Foulke (3)	Fenway Park	35,027	6–7
14	April 20	@ White Sox	11–8	Quantrill (2–0)	Buehrle (1–1)	Rivera (4)	U.S. Cellular Field	32,034	7–7
15	April 21	@ White Sox	3–1	Vazquez (2–1)	Garland (1–1)	Rivera (5)	U.S. Cellular Field	26,154	8–7
16	April 22	@ White Sox	3–4	Schoeneweis (2–1)	Mussina (1–4)	Marte (2)	U.S. Cellular Field	34,030	8–8
17	April 23	Red Sox	2–11	Lowe (2–1)	Contreras (0–2)	—	Yankee Stadium	55,001	8–9
18	April 24	Red Sox	2–3 (12)	Foulke (1–0)	Quantrill (2–1)	Timlin (1)	Yankee Stadium	55,195	8–10
19	April 25	Red Sox	0–2	Martinez (3–1)	Vazquez (2–2)	Williamson (1)	Yankee Stadium	55,338	8–11
20	April 27	Athletics	10–8	Osborne (1–0)	Mecir (0–2)	Rivera (6)	Yankee Stadium	33,191	9–11
21	April 28	Athletics	5–1	Contreras (1–2)	Mulder (2–2)	Gordon (1)	Yankee Stadium	44,325	10–11
22	April 29	Athletics	7–5	Brown (4–0)	Zito (2–3)	Rivera (7)	Yankee Stadium	35,651	11–11
23	April 30	Royals	5–2	Vázques (3–2)	Anderson (1–2)	Rivera (8)	Yankee Stadium	43,237	12–11

May (18–8) Home: 6–2 Away: 12–6

#	Date	Opponent	Score	Win	Loss	Save	Location	Attendance	Record
24	May 1	Royals	12–4	Lieber (1–0)	Villacis (0–1)	—	Yankee Stadium	54,103	13–11
25	May 2	Royals	4–2	Mussina (2–4)	Affeldt (0–3)	Rivera (9)	Yankee Stadium	49,208	14–11
26	May 4	@ Athletics	10–8	Osborne (2–0)	Bradford (1–1)	Rivera (10)	Network Associates Coliseum	35,081	15–11
27	May 5	@ Athletics	4–3	Quantrill (3–1)	Rhodes (0–1)	Rivera (11)	Network Associates Coliseum	43,227	16–11
28	May 6	@ Athletics	4–7	Harden (1–2)	Vazquez (3–3)	Mecir (1)	Network Associates Coliseum	38,417	16–12
29	May 7	@ Mariners	2–6	Franklin (2–2)	Lieber (1–1)	—	Safeco Field	46,491	16–13
30	May 8	@ Mariners	6–0	Mussina (3–4)	Meche (1–3)	—	Safeco Field	46,454	17–13
31	May 9	@ Mariners	7–6	Quantrill (4–1)	Soriano (0–3)	Rivera (12)	Safeco Field	46,589	18–13
32	May 11	Angels	8–7 (10)	Gordon (1–1)	Weber (0–1)	—	Yankee Stadium	36,706	19–13
33	May 12	Angels	2–11	Sele (2–0)	Vázquez (3–4)	—	Yankee Stadium	49,954	19–14
34	May 13	Angels	7–4	Lieber (2–1)	Lackey (3–4)	Rivera (13)	Yankee Stadium	41,089	20–14
35	May 14	Mariners	9–5	Mussina (4–4)	Villone (3–2)	—	Yankee Stadium	49,653	21–14
36	May 15	Mariners	7–13 (13)	Guardado (1–0)	White (0–1)	—	Yankee Stadium	54,531	21–15
37	May 16	Mariners	2–1	Brown (5–0)	Piñeiro (1–5)	Rivera (14)	Yankee Stadium	54,732	22–15
38	May 18	@ Angels	0–1 (11)	Shields (3–0)	Quantrill (4–2)	—	Angel Stadium of Anaheim	43,660	22–16
39	May 19	@ Angels	4–2	Lieber (3–1)	Lackey (3–5)	Rivera (15)	Angel Stadium of Anaheim	43,742	23–16
40	May 20	@ Angels	6–2	Mussina (5–4)	Colon (4–3)	—	Angel Stadium of Anaheim	43,810	24–16
41	May 21	@ Rangers	7–9	Benoit (2–1)	Brown (5–1)	Cordero (14)	The Ballpark in Arlington	49,195	24–17
42	May 22	@ Rangers	3–4	Almanzar (4–0)	Gordon (1–2)	—	The Ballpark in Arlington	49,458	24–18
43	May 23	@ Rangers	8–3	Vazquez (4–4)	Dickey (4–4)	—	The Ballpark in Arlington	50,241	25–18
44	May 25	@ Orioles	11–3	Lieber (4–1)	Bedard (1–2)	—	Oriole Park at Camden Yards	42,846	26–18
45	May 26	@ Orioles	12–9	Sturtze (1–0)	Ryan (1–2)	Rivera (16)	Oriole Park at Camden Yards	37,610	27–18
46	May 27	@ Orioles	18–5	Contreras (2–2)	Ponson (3–5)	—	Oriole Park at Camden Yards	46,282	28–18
47	May 28	@ Devil Rays	7–5	Vázquez (5–4)	Waechter (2–5)	Rivera (17)	Tropicana Field	20,627	29–18
48	May 29	@ Devil Rays	5–3	Brown (6–1)	Hendrickson (2–5)	Rivera (18)	Tropicana Field	25,692	30–18
49	May 30	@ Devil Rays	6–7	Zambrano (5–4)	Lieber (4–2)	Baez (8)	Tropicana Field	26,098	30–19

June (19–7) Home: 14–3 Away: 5–4

#	Date	Opponent	Score	Win	Loss	Save	Location	Attendance	Record
50	June 1	Orioles	8–7	Mussina (6–4)	Ponson (3–6)	Rivera (19)	Yankee Stadium	38,012	31–19
51	June 2	Orioles	6–5	Prinz (1–0)	DuBose (4–4)	Rivera (20)	Yankee Stadium	50,502	32–19
52	June 3	Orioles	5–2	Vazquez (6–4)	Parrish (3–2)	Rivera (21)	Yankee Stadium	44,020	33–19
53	June 4	Rangers	7–6	Brown (7–1)	Powell (1–1)	Rivera (22)	Yankee Stadium	49,372	34–19
54	June 5	Rangers	1–8	Dominguez (1–1)	Lieber (4–3)	—	Yankee Stadium	51,910	34–20
55	June 6	Rangers	2–1	Mussina (7–4)	Drese (2–3)	Rivera (23)	Yankee Stadium	54,092	35–20
56	June 8	Rockies	2–1	Vázquez (7–4)	Fassero (0–6)	Rivera (24)	Yankee Stadium	51,852	36–20
57	June 9	Rockies	7–5	Quantrill (5–2)	Kennedy (4–4)	Rivera (25)	Yankee Stadium	38,013	37–20
58	June 10	Rockies	10–4	Contreras (3–2)	Jennings (5–6)	—	Yankee Stadium	41,586	38–20
59	June 11	Padres	2–10	Eaton (3–6)	Heredia (0–1)	Otsuka (2)	Yankee Stadium	49,855	38–21
60	June 12	Padres	3–2	Lieber (5–3)	Tankersley (0–3)	Rivera (26)	Yankee Stadium	54,280	39–21
61	June 13	Padres	6–5 (12)	Heredia (1–1)	Beck (0–1)	—	Yankee Stadium	52,754	40–21
62	June 15	@ Diamondbacks	4–2	Contreras (4–2)	Webb (3–6)	Rivera (27)	Bank One Ballpark	48,066	41–21
63	June 16	@ Diamondbacks	9–4	Sturtze (2–0)	Fossum (1–5)	—	Bank One Ballpark	48,274	42–21
64	June 17	@ Diamondbacks	1–6	Sparks (3–4)	Lieber (5–4)	Dessens (2)	Bank One Ballpark	48,252	42–22
65	June 18	@ Dodgers	3–6	Weaver (5–7)	Vazquez (7–5)	Gagne (17)	Dodger Stadium	55,207	42–23
66	June 19	@ Dodgers	6–2	Halsey (1–0)	Nomo (3–8)	—	Dodger Stadium	54,876	43–23
67	June 20	@ Dodgers	4–5	Lima (6–2)	Contreras (4–3)	Gagne (18)	Dodger Stadium	55,157	43–24
68	June 22	@ Orioles	10–4	Mussina (8–4)	Riley (1–3)	—	Oriole Park at Camden Yards	49,696	44–24
69	June 23	@ Orioles	2–13	Bedard (2–2)	Lieber (5–5)	—	Oriole Park at Camden Yards	41,678	44–25
70	June 24	@ Orioles	5–2	Vazquez (8–5)	Ponson (3–10)	Rivera (28)	Oriole Park at Camden Yards	48,442	45–25
–	June 25	Mets	Postponed (rain) Rescheduled for June 27						
71	June 26	Mets	3–9	Leiter (3–2)	Halsey (1–1)	—	Yankee Stadium	55,303	45–26
72	June 27 (1)	Mets	8–1	Contreras (5–3)	Trachsel (7–6)	Gordon (2)	Yankee Stadium	37,305	46–26
73	June 27 (2)	Mets	11–6	Mussina (9–4)	Ginter (1–2)	—	Yankee Stadium	55,387	47–26
74	June 29	Red Sox	11–3	Vazquez (9–5)	Lowe (6–7)	—	Yankee Stadium	55,231	48–26
75	June 30	Red Sox	4–2	Gordon (2–2)	Timlin (4–3)	Rivera (29)	Yankee Stadium	55,023	49–26

July (16–12) Home: 10–3 Away: 6–9

#	Date	Opponent	Score	Win	Loss	Save	Location	Attendance	Record
76	July 1	Red Sox	5–4 (13)	Sturtze (3–0)	Leskanic (0–4)	—	Yankee Stadium	55,265	50–26
77	July 2	@ Mets	2–11	Trachsel (8–6)	Mussina (9–5)	—	Shea Stadium	55,068	50–27
78	July 3	@ Mets	9–10	Franco (2–4)	Sturtze (3–1)	—	Shea Stadium	55,120	50–28
79	July 4	@ Mets	5–6	Moreno (2–1)	Gordon (2–3)	Looper (16)	Shea Stadium	55,437	50–29
80	July 5	Tigers	10–3	Lieber (6–5)	Robertson (7–4)	—	Yankee Stadium	52,608	51–29
81	July 6	Tigers	1–9	Johnson (6–7)	Mussina (9–6)	—	Yankee Stadium	41,772	51–30
82	July 7	Tigers	8–10	Bonderman (6–6)	Halsey (1–2)	Urbina (12)	Yankee Stadium	50,338	51–31
83	July 8	Devil Rays	7–1	Contreras (6–3)	Zambrano (9–5)	Rivera (30)	Yankee Stadium	40,378	52–31
84	July 9	Devil Rays	5–4	Vazquez (10–5)	Colome (2–2)	Rivera (31)	Yankee Stadium	47,700	53–31
85	July 10	Devil Rays	6–3	Lieber (7–5)	Brazelton (2–2)	Rivera (32)	Yankee Stadium	54,680	54–31
86	July 11	Devil Rays	10–3	Hernandez (1–0)	Hendrickson (6–7)	—	Yankee Stadium	53,383	55–31
75th All-Star Game in Houston, Texas
87	July 15	@ Tigers	5–1	Contreras (7–3)	Bonderman (6–7)	—	Comerica Park	38,902	56–31
88	July 16	@ Tigers	0–8	Maroth (6–7)	Vazquez (10–6)	—	Comerica Park	40,918	56–32
89	July 17	@ Tigers	5–3	Hernandez (2–0)	Knotts (5–4)	Rivera (33)	Comerica Park	41,857	57–32
90	July 18	@ Tigers	2–4	Robertson (9–4)	Lieber (7–6)	Urbina (15)	Comerica Park	40,132	57–33
91	July 19	@ Devil Rays	7–9	Carter (3–2)	Sturtze (3–2)	Baez (19)	Tropicana Field	41,755	57–34
92	July 20	@ Devil Rays	4–2	Contreras (8–3)	Zambrano (9–6)	Rivera (34)	Tropicana Field	27,613	58–34
93	July 21	Blue Jays	10–3	Vazquez (11–6)	Hentgen (2–9)	—	Yankee Stadium	53,031	59–34
94	July 22	Blue Jays	1–0	Rivera (1–0)	Chulk (0–2)	—	Yankee Stadium	53,657	60–34
95	July 23	@ Red Sox	8–7	Gordon (3–3)	Foulke (2–3)	Rivera (35)	Fenway Park	34,933	61–34
96	July 24	@ Red Sox	10–11	Mendoza (1–0)	Rivera (1–1)	—	Fenway Park	34,501	61–35
97	July 25	@ Red Sox	6–9	Lowe (9–9)	Contreras (8–4)	Foulke (16)	Fenway Park	35,006	61–36
98	July 26	@ Blue Jays	6–5 (10)	Rivera (2–1)	Frasor (3–3)	—	SkyDome	30,041	62–36
99	July 27	@ Blue Jays	7–4	Proctor (1–0)	Lightenberg (1–3)	Gordon (3)	SkyDome	30,087	63–36
100	July 28	@ Blue Jays	2–3 (10)	Frasor (4–3)	Proctor (1–1)	—	SkyDome	31,385	63–37
101	July 29	Orioles	1–9	Ponson (6–12)	Contreras (8–5)	—	Yankee Stadium	51,677	63–38
102	July 30	Orioles	2–1	Brown (8–1)	Cabrera (8–5)	Rivera (36)	Yankee Stadium	51,551	64–38
103	July 31	Orioles	6–4	Vazquez (12–6)	Bedard (4–6)	Rivera (37)	Yankee Stadium	51,845	65–38

August (16–12) Home: 6–6 Away: 10–6

#	Date	Opponent	Score	Win	Loss	Save	Location	Attendance	Record
104	August 1	Orioles	9–7	Hernandez (3–0)	Lopez (8–7)	Rivera (38)	Yankee Stadium	51,632	66–38
105	August 3	Athletics	4–13	Mulder (15–3)	Lieber (7–7)	—	Yankee Stadium	50,625	66–39
106	August 4	Athletics	8–6 (11)	Rivera (3–1)	Duchscherer (4–3)	—	Yankee Stadium	47,885	67–39
107	August 5	Athletics	5–1	Brown (9–1)	Zito (7–8)	—	Yankee Stadium	52,335	68–39
108	August 6	Blue Jays	11–4	Vazquez (13–6)	Douglass (0–2)	—	Yankee Stadium	48,900	69–39
109	August 7	Blue Jays	6–0	Hernandez (4–0)	Lilly (8–8)	—	Yankee Stadium	54,025	70–39
110	August 8	Blue Jays	8–2	Lieber (8–7)	Batista (9–7)	—	Yankee Stadium	52,616	71–39
111	August 9	Blue Jays	4–5	Towers (7–4)	Loaiza (9–6)	Frasor (15)	Yankee Stadium	49,853	71–40
112	August 10	@ Rangers	1–7	Drese (9–6)	Brown (9–2)	—	The Ballpark in Arlington	43,633	71–41
113	August 11	@ Rangers	4–2	Sturtze (4–2)	Regilio (0–4)	Rivera (39)	The Ballpark in Arlington	43,729	72–41
114	August 12	@ Rangers	5–1	Hernandez (5–0)	Erickson (0–3)	—	The Ballpark in Arlington	48,925	73–41
115	August 13	@ Mariners	11–3	Lieber (9–7)	Villone (4–3)	—	Safeco Field	46,359	74–41
116	August 14	@ Mariners	6–4	Quantrill (6–2)	Hasegawa (4–5)	Rivera (40)	Safeco Field	46,530	75–41
117	August 15	@ Mariners	3–7	Meche (3–5)	Nitkowski (1–1)	—	Safeco Field	46,335	75–42
118	August 17	@ Twins	2–8	Radke (8–6)	Vazquez (13–7)	—	Hubert H. Humphrey Metrodome	38,766	75–43
119	August 18	@ Twins	2–7	Santana (13–6)	Mussina (9–7)	—	Hubert H. Humphrey Metrodome	41,125	75–44
120	August 19	@ Twins	13–10	Gordon (4–3)	Nathan (1–1)	Rivera (41)	Hubert H. Humphrey Metrodome	37,959	76–44
121	August 20	Angels	0–5	Ortiz (4–7)	Lieber (9–8)	—	Yankee Stadium	53.530	76–45
122	August 21	Angels	1–6	Shields (7–2)	Loaiza (9–7)	—	Yankee Stadium	54,008	76–46
123	August 22	Angels	3–4	Escobar (8–9)	Brown (9–3)	Percival (24)	Yankee Stadium	53,885	76–47
124	August 23	@ Indians	6–4	Gordon (5–3)	Wickman (0–1)	Rivera (42)	Jacobs Field	33,172	77–47
125	August 24	@ Indians	5–4	Gordon (6–3)	Wickman (0–2)	Rivera (43)	Jacobs Field	31,729	78–47
126	August 25	@ Indians	3–4	Riske (7–2)	Gordon (6–4)	Betancourt (3)	Jacobs Field	30,605	78–48
127	August 26	@ Blue Jays	7–4	Nitkowski (2–1)	Frasor (4–4)	Rivera (44)	SkyDome	35,682	79–48
128	August 27	@ Blue Jays	8–7	Sturtze (5–2)	Miller (2–3)	Gordon (4)	SkyDome	35,436	80–48
129	August 28	@ Blue Jays	18–6	Brown (10–3)	Lilly (9–9)	Rivera (45)	SkyDome	43,541	81–48
130	August 29	@ Blue Jays	4–6	Batista (10–10)	Mussina (9–8)	Frasor (17)	SkyDome	44,072	81–49
131	August 31	Indians	0–22	Westbrook (12–6)	Vazquez (13–8)	—	Yankee Stadium	51,777	81–50

September (19–9) Home: 14–5 Away: 5–4

#	Date	Opponent	Score	Win	Loss	Save	Location	Attendance	Record
132	September 1	Indians	5–3	Hernandez (6–0)	Sabathia (10–9)	Rivera (46)	Yankee Stadium	41,448	82–50
133	September 2	Indians	9–1	Lieber (10–8)	Lee (10–7)	—	Yankee Stadium	37,963	83–50
134	September 3	Orioles	1–3	Lopez (11–8)	Brown (10–4)	Julio (20)	Yankee Stadium	44,148	83–51
135	September 4	Orioles	0–7	Ponson (10–13)	Mussina (9–9)	—	Yankee Stadium	48,963	83–52
136	September 5	Orioles	4–3	Rivera (4–1)	Julio (2–3)	—	Yankee Stadium	48,252	84–52
137	September 6 (1)	Devil Rays	7–4	Hernandez (7–0)	Waechter (3–7)	Quantrill (1)	Yankee Stadium	44,422	85–52
–	September 6 (2)	Devil Rays	Postponed Rescheduled for September 8						
138	September 7	Devil Rays	11–2	Lieber (11–8)	Sosa (3–4)	—	Yankee Stadium	33,518	86–52
–	September 8 (1)	Devil Rays	Postponed (rain) Rescheduled for September 23						
–	September 8 (2)	Devil Rays	Postponed (rain) Rescheduled for September 9						
139	September 9 (1)	Devil Rays	9–1	Mussina (10–9)	Brazelton (6–7)	—	Yankee Stadium	N/A	87–52
140	September 9 (2)	Devil Rays	10–5	Sturtze (6–2)	Bell (6–8)	—	Yankee Stadium	41,230	88–52
141	September 10	@ Orioles	8–14	Lopez (12–8)	Vazquez (13–9)	—	Oriole Park at Camden Yards	48,026	88–53
142	September 11	@ Orioles	5–2	Hernandez (8–0)	Ponson (10–14)	Rivera (47)	Oriole Park at Camden Yards	47,858	89–53
143	September 12	@ Orioles	9–7	Gordon (7–4)	Julio (2–5)	Rivera (48)	Oriole Park at Camden Yards	47,780	90–53
144	September 13	@ Royals	8–17	Anderson (4–11)	Halsey (1–3)	—	Kauffman Stadium	23,951	90–54
145	September 14	@ Royals	4–0	Mussina (11–9)	Greinke (8–10)	—	Kauffman Stadium	23,426	91–54
146	September 15	@ Royals	3–0	Vazquez (14–9)	May (9–18)	Rivera (49)	Kauffman Stadium	22,418	92–54
147	September 17	Red Sox	2–3	Timlin (5–4)	Rivera (4–2)	Foulke (30)	Yankee Stadium	55,128	92–55
148	September 18	Red Sox	14–4	Lieber (12–8)	Lowe (14–12)	—	Yankee Stadium	55,153	93–55
149	September 19	Red Sox	11–1	Mussina (12–9)	Martinez (16–7)	—	Yankee Stadium	55,142	94–55
150	September 20	Blue Jays (Note: Blue Jays-Yankees was originally scheduled for September 23, but has been moved up to accommodate a makeup against Tampa Bay caused by Hurricane Frances.)	3–6	Chacin (1–0)	Vazquez (14–10)	Batista (2)	Yankee Stadium	10,732	94–56
151	September 21	Blue Jays	5–3	Loaiza (10–7)	Halladay (7–8)	Rivera (50)	Yankee Stadium	36,675	95–56
152	September 22	Blue Jays	4–5	Lilly (12–10)	Hernandez (8–1)	Batista (3)	Yankee Stadium	49,560	95–57
153	September 23	Devil Rays	7–3	Lieber (13–8)	Ritchie (0–2)	—	Yankee Stadium	29,501	96–57
154	September 24	@ Red Sox	6–4	Gordon (8–4)	Martinez (16–8)	Rivera (51)	Fenway Park	35,022	97–57
155	September 25	@ Red Sox	5–12	Foulke (5–3)	Quantrill (6–3)	—	Fenway Park	34,856	97–58
156	September 26	@ Red Sox	4–11	Schilling (21–6)	Brown (10–5)	—	Fenway Park	34,582	97–59
–	September 28	Twins	Postponed (rain) Rescheduled for September 29						
157	September 29 (1)	Twins	5–3	Quantrill (7–3)	Romero (7–4)	Rivera (52)	Yankee Stadium	N/A	98–59
158	September 29 (2)	Twins	5–4	Lieber (14–8)	Lohse (8–12)	Rivera (53)	Yankee Stadium	45,072	99–59
159	September 30	Twins	6–4	Gordon (9–4)	Fultz (3–3)	—	Yankee Stadium	48,454	100–59

October (1–2) Home: 0–0 Away: 1–2

#	Date	Opponent	Score	Win	Loss	Save	Location	Attendance	Record
160	October 1	@ Blue Jays	0–7	Bush (5–4)	Hernandez (8–2)	—	SkyDome	48,914	100–60
161	October 2	@ Blue Jays	2–4	Halladay (8–8)	Brown (10–6)	Batista (5)	SkyDome	50,498	100–61
162	October 3	@ Blue Jays	3–2	Proctor (2–1)	Towers (9–9)	Sturtze (1)	SkyDome	49,948	101–61

== Player stats ==
=== Batting ===
Note: G = Games played; AB = At bats; H = Hits; Avg. = Batting average; HR = Home runs; RBI = Runs batted in

Player	G	AB	H	Avg.	HR	RBI
Jorge Posada, C	137	449	122	.272	21	81
Tony Clark, 1B	106	253	56	.221	16	49
Miguel Cairo, 2B	122	360	105	.292	6	42
Derek Jeter, SS	154	643	188	.292	23	78
Alex Rodriguez, 3B	155	601	172	.286	36	106
Hideki Matsui, LF	162	584	174	.298	31	108
Bernie Williams, CF	148	561	147	.262	22	70
Gary Sheffield, RF	154	573	166	.290	36	121
Rubén Sierra, DH	107	307	75	.244	17	65

=== Other batters ===
Note: G = Games played; AB = At bats; H = Hits; Avg. = Batting average; HR = Home runs; RBI = Runs batted in

Player	G	AB	H	Avg.	HR	RBI
Kenny Lofton	83	276	76	.275	3	18
Jason Giambi	80	264	55	.208	12	40
Enrique Wilson	93	240	51	.213	6	31
John Olerud	49	164	46	.280	4	26
John Flaherty	47	127	32	.252	6	16
Bubba Crosby	55	53	8	.151	2	7
Travis Lee	7	19	2	.105	0	2
Félix Escalona	5	8	0	.000	0	0
Andy Phillips	5	8	2	.250	1	2
Homer Bush	9	7	0	.000	0	0
Dioner Navarro	5	7	3	.429	0	1

=== Pitching ===
==== Starting pitchers ====
Note: G = Games pitched; IP = Innings pitched; W = Wins; L = Losses; ERA = Earned run average; SO = Strikeouts

Player	G	IP	W	L	ERA	SO
Javier Vázquez	32	198.0	14	10	4.91	150
Jon Lieber	27	176.2	14	8	4.33	102
Mike Mussina	27	164.2	12	9	4.59	132
Kevin Brown	22	132.0	10	6	4.09	83
José Contreras	18	95.2	8	5	5.64	82
Orlando Hernández	15	84.2	8	2	3.30	84
Brad Halsey	8	32.0	1	3	6.47	25

==== Other pitchers ====
Note: G = Games pitched; IP = Innings pitched; W = Wins; L = Losses; ERA = Earned run average; SO = Strikeouts

Player	G	IP	W	L	ERA	SO
Esteban Loaiza	10	42.1	1	2	8.50	34
Donovan Osborne	9	17.2	2	0	7.13	10
Jorge De Paula	3	9.0	0	1	5.00	2
Alex Graman	3	5.0	0	0	19.80	4

==== Relief pitchers ====
Note: G = Games pitched; W = Wins; L = Losses; SV = Saves; ERA = Earned run average; SO = Strikeouts

Player	G	W	L	SV	ERA	SO
Mariano Rivera	74	4	2	53	1.94	66
Paul Quantrill	86	7	3	1	4.72	37
Tom Gordon	80	9	4	4	2.21	96
Félix Heredia	47	1	1	0	6.28	25
Tanyon Sturtze	28	6	2	1	5.47	56
Bret Prinz	26	1	0	0	5.08	22
Scott Proctor	26	2	1	0	5.40	21
Gabe White	24	0	1	0	8.27	8
C.J. Nitkowski	19	1	1	0	7.62	10
Steve Karsay	7	0	0	0	2.70	4
Juan Padilla	6	0	0	0	3.97	5
Sam Marsonek	1	0	0	0	0.00	0

== Postseason ==
=== Game log ===
2004 Postseason Game Log (6–5)
ALDS vs Twins (3–1)

#	Date	Opponent	Score	Win	Loss	Save	Location	Attendance	Record
1	October 5	Twins	0–2	Santana (1–0)	Mussina (0–1)	Nathan (1)	Yankee Stadium	55,749	0–1
2	October 6	Twins	7–6 (12)	Quantrill (1–0)	Nathan (0–1)	—	Yankee Stadium	56,354	1–1
3	October 8	@ Twins	8–4	Brown (1–0)	Silva (0–1)	—	Hubert H. Humphrey Metrodome	54,803	2–1
4	October 9	@ Twins	6–5 (11)	Rivera (1–0)	Lohse (0–1)	—	Hubert H. Humphrey Metrodome	52,498	3–1

ALCS vs Red Sox (3–4)

#	Date	Opponent	Score	Win	Loss	Save	Location	Attendance	Record
1	October 12	Red Sox	10–7	Mussina (1–0)	Schilling (0–1)	Rivera (1)	Yankee Stadium	56,135	1–0
2	October 13	Red Sox	3–1	Lieber (1–0)	Martinez (0–1)	Rivera (2)	Yankee Stadium	56,136	2–0
–	October 15	@ Red Sox	Postponed (rain) Rescheduled for October 16						
3	October 16	@ Red Sox	19–8	Vazquez (1–0)	Mendoza (0–1)	—	Fenway Park	35,126	3–0
4	October 17	@ Red Sox	4–6 (12)	Leskanic (1–0)	Quantrill (0–1)	—	Fenway Park	34,826	3–1
5	October 18	@ Red Sox	4–5 (14)	Wakefield (1–0)	Loaiza (0–1)	—	Fenway Park	35,120	3–2
6	October 19	Red Sox	2–4	Schilling (1–1)	Lieber (1–1)	Foulke (1)	Yankee Stadium	56,128	3–3
7	October 20	Red Sox	3–10	Lowe (1–0)	Brown (0–1)	—	Yankee Stadium	56,129	3–4

== Awards and records ==
- Derek Jeter, Shortstop, Gold Glove
- Gary Sheffield, Outfield, Silver Slugger
- Mariano Rivera, Yankees Single Season Record, Most Saves in a Season (53)

2004 MLB All-Star Game

- Jason Giambi, first baseman, starter
- Alex Rodriguez, third baseman, starter
- Derek Jeter, shortstop, starter
- Mariano Rivera, relief pitcher, reserve
- Javier Vasquez, pitcher, reserve
- Hideki Matsui, outfield, reserve
- Gary Sheffield, outfield, reserve

== Farm system ==
Level	Team	League	Manager
AAA	Columbus Clippers	International League	Bucky Dent
AA	Trenton Thunder	Eastern League	Stump Merrill
A	Tampa Yankees	Florida State League	Bill Masse
A	Battle Creek Yankees	Midwest League	Mitch Seoane and Bill Mosiello
A-Short Season	Staten Island Yankees	New York–Penn League	Tommy John
Rookie	GCL Yankees	Gulf Coast League	Oscar Acosta

LEAGUE CHAMPIONS: GCL Yankees; LEAGUE CO-CHAMPIONS: Tampa
