= 2004 Baltimore Orioles season =

Major League Baseball season

2004 Baltimore Orioles
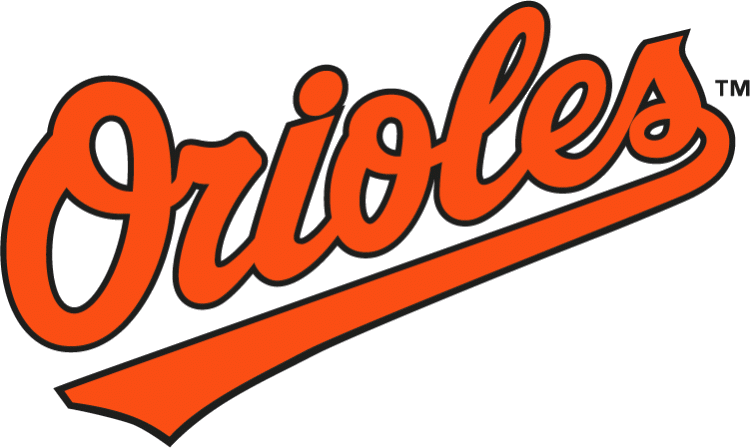
- League: American League
- Division: East
- Ballpark: Oriole Park at Camden Yards
- City: Baltimore
- Record: 78–84 (.481)
- Divisional place: 3rd
- Owners: Peter Angelos
- General managers: Jim Beattie/Mike Flanagan
- Managers: Lee Mazzilli
- Television: WJZ-TV; WNUV; WDCA; Comcast SportsNet (Jim Palmer, Michael Reghi, Buck Martinez, Fred Manfra)
- Radio: WBAL (AM) (Fred Manfra, Jim Hunter, Joe Angel)

The 2004 Baltimore Orioles season was the 104th season in Baltimore Orioles franchise history, the 51st in Baltimore, and the 13th at Oriole Park at Camden Yards. They improved on their 71–91–1 (.439) record from the previous year with a 78–84 record, but missed the postseason for the 7th straight season. The team led Major League Baseball in at bats (5,736) and hits (1,614).

== Offseason ==
- December 3, 2003: Bill Haselman was signed as a free agent with the Baltimore Orioles.
- February 5, 2004: Clay Bellinger was signed as a free agent with the Baltimore Orioles.
- March 15, 2004: B.J. Surhoff was signed as a free agent with the Baltimore Orioles.

== Regular season ==
=== Season standings ===
AL East
| Team | W | L | Pct. | GB | Home | Road |
|---|---|---|---|---|---|---|
| New York Yankees | 101 | 61 | .623 | — | 57‍–‍24 | 44‍–‍37 |
| Boston Red Sox | 98 | 64 | .605 | 3 | 55‍–‍26 | 43‍–‍38 |
| Baltimore Orioles | 78 | 84 | .481 | 23 | 38‍–‍43 | 40‍–‍41 |
| Tampa Bay Devil Rays | 70 | 91 | .435 | 30½ | 41‍–‍39 | 29‍–‍52 |
| Toronto Blue Jays | 67 | 94 | .416 | 33½ | 40‍–‍41 | 27‍–‍53 |

=== Record vs. opponents ===
2004 American League record Source: MLB Standings Grid – 2004
| Team | ANA | BAL | BOS | CWS | CLE | DET | KC | MIN | NYY | OAK | SEA | TB | TEX | TOR | NL |
|---|---|---|---|---|---|---|---|---|---|---|---|---|---|---|---|
| Anaheim | — | 6–3 | 4–5 | 5–4 | 4–5 | 7–2 | 7–0 | 5–4 | 5–4 | 10–9 | 13–7 | 6–1 | 9–10 | 4–5 | 7–11 |
| Baltimore | 3–6 | — | 10–9 | 2–4 | 3–3 | 6–0 | 6–3 | 4–5 | 5–14 | 0–7 | 7–2 | 11–8 | 5–2 | 11–8 | 5–13 |
| Boston | 5–4 | 9–10 | — | 4–2 | 3–4 | 6–1 | 4–2 | 2–4 | 11–8 | 8–1 | 5–4 | 14–5 | 4–5 | 14–5 | 9–9 |
| Chicago | 4–5 | 4–2 | 2–4 | — | 10–9 | 8–11 | 13–6 | 9–10 | 3–4 | 2–7 | 7–2 | 4–2 | 6–3 | 3–4 | 8–10 |
| Cleveland | 5–4 | 3–3 | 4–3 | 9–10 | — | 9–10 | 11–8 | 7–12 | 2–4 | 6–3 | 5–4 | 3–3 | 1–8 | 5–2 | 10–8 |
| Detroit | 2–7 | 0–6 | 1–6 | 11–8 | 10–9 | — | 8–11 | 7–12 | 4–3 | 4–5 | 5–4 | 3–3 | 4–5 | 4–2 | 9–9 |
| Kansas City | 0–7 | 3–6 | 2–4 | 6–13 | 8–11 | 11–8 | — | 7–12 | 1–5 | 2–7 | 2–5 | 3–6 | 4–5 | 3–3 | 6–12 |
| Minnesota | 4–5 | 5–4 | 4–2 | 10–9 | 12–7 | 12–7 | 12–7 | — | 2–4 | 2–5 | 5–4 | 4–5 | 5–2 | 4–2 | 11–7 |
| New York | 4–5 | 14–5 | 8–11 | 4–3 | 4–2 | 3–4 | 5–1 | 4–2 | — | 7–2 | 6–3 | 15–4 | 5–4 | 12–7 | 10–8 |
| Oakland | 9–10 | 7–0 | 1–8 | 7–2 | 3–6 | 5–4 | 7–2 | 5–2 | 2–7 | — | 11–8 | 7–2 | 11–9 | 6–3 | 10–8 |
| Seattle | 7–13 | 2–7 | 4–5 | 2–7 | 4–5 | 4–5 | 5–2 | 4–5 | 3–6 | 8–11 | — | 2–5 | 7–12 | 2–7 | 9–9 |
| Tampa Bay | 1–6 | 8–11 | 5–14 | 2–4 | 3–3 | 3–3 | 6–3 | 5–4 | 4–15 | 2–7 | 5–2 | — | 2–7 | 9–9 | 15–3 |
| Texas | 10–9 | 2–5 | 5–4 | 3–6 | 8–1 | 5–4 | 5–4 | 2–5 | 4–5 | 9–11 | 12–7 | 7–2 | — | 7–2 | 10–8 |
| Toronto | 5–4 | 8–11 | 5–14 | 4–3 | 2–5 | 2–4 | 3–3 | 2–4 | 7–12 | 3–6 | 7–2 | 9–9 | 2–7 | — | 8–10 |

=== Notable transactions ===
July 6, 2004: Ken Huckaby was selected off waivers by the Baltimore Orioles from the Texas Rangers.

=== Roster ===
2004 Baltimore Orioles
Roster
| Pitchers: 29 Kurt Ainsworth; 30 Rick Bauer; 16 Denny Bautista; 45 Érik Bédard; 61 Dave Borkowski; 35 Daniel Cabrera; 64 Bruce Chen; 49 Darwin Cubillán; 47 Mike DeJean; 59,38,28 Eric DuBose; 38 Jason Grimsley; 27 Buddy Groom; 50 Jorge Julio; 19 Rodrigo López; 49 John Maine; 36 John Parrish; 43 Sidney Ponson; 47 Aaron Rakers; 12 Matt Riley; 40 Eddy Rodríguez; 52 B. J. Ryan; 53 Todd Williams | Catchers: 9 Gerónimo Gil; 9 Ken Huckaby; 18 Javy López; 72 Robert Machado; 40 Keith Osik; Infielders: 14 José León; 26 Luis López; 6 Melvin Mora; 25 Rafael Palmeiro; 1 Brian Roberts; 23 David Segui; 10 Miguel Tejada | Outfielders: 14 José Bautista; 3 Larry Bigbie; 39 Jack Cust; 47 Karim García; 31 Jay Gibbons; 15 Jerry Hairston Jr.; 63 Val Majewski; 32 Luis Matos; 11,39 Darnell McDonald; 39 Chad Mottola; 11 David Newhan; 16 Tim Raines Jr.; 17 B. J. Surhoff | Manager: 13 Lee Mazzilli; Coaches: 48 Terry Crowley (hitting); 24 Rick Dempsey (first base); 44 Elrod Hendricks (bullpen catcher); 2 Sam Perlozzo (bench); 49 Tom Trebelhorn (third base); 34 Mark Wiley (pitching) |

== Player stats ==
=== Batting ===
==== Starters by position ====
Note: Pos = Position; G = Games played; AB = At bats; H = Hits; Avg. = Batting average; HR = Home runs; RBI = Runs batted in

| Pos | Player | G | AB | H | Avg. | HR | RBI |
|---|---|---|---|---|---|---|---|
| C | Javy López | 150 | 579 | 183 | .316 | 23 | 86 |
| 1B | Rafael Palmeiro | 154 | 550 | 142 | .258 | 23 | 88 |
| 2B | Brian Roberts | 159 | 641 | 175 | .273 | 4 | 53 |
| SS | Miguel Tejeda | 162 | 653 | 203 | .311 | 34 | 150 |
| 3B | Melvin Mora | 140 | 550 | 187 | .340 | 27 | 104 |
| LF | Larry Bigbie | 139 | 478 | 134 | .280 | 15 | 68 |
| CF | Luis Matos | 89 | 330 | 74 | .224 | 6 | 28 |
| RF | Jay Gibbons | 97 | 346 | 85 | .246 | 10 | 47 |
| DH | David Newhan | 95 | 373 | 116 | .311 | 8 | 54 |

==== Other batters ====
Note: G = Games played; AB = At bats; H = Hits; Avg. = Batting average; HR = Home runs; RBI = Runs batted in

| Player | G | AB | H | Avg. | HR | RBI |
|---|---|---|---|---|---|---|
| B.J. Surhoff | 100 | 343 | 106 | .309 | 8 | 50 |
| Jerry Hairston Jr. | 86 | 287 | 87 | .303 | 2 | 24 |
| Tim Raines Jr. | 48 | 94 | 24 | .255 | 0 | 5 |
| Luis López | 56 | 88 | 16 | .182 | 1 | 8 |
| Robert Machado | 37 | 73 | 11 | .151 | 1 | 3 |
| Karim García | 23 | 66 | 14 | .212 | 3 | 11 |
| José León | 31 | 66 | 12 | .182 | 2 | 8 |
| David Segui | 18 | 59 | 20 | .339 | 1 | 7 |
| Gerónimo Gil | 12 | 32 | 9 | .281 | 0 | 4 |
| Darnell McDonald | 17 | 32 | 5 | .156 | 0 | 1 |
| Keith Osik | 11 | 25 | 2 | .080 | 0 | 0 |
| Chad Mottola | 6 | 14 | 2 | .143 | 1 | 3 |
| Val Majewski | 9 | 13 | 2 | .154 | 0 | 1 |
| Ken Huckaby | 8 | 12 | 2 | .167 | 0 | 0 |
| José Bautista | 16 | 11 | 3 | .273 | 0 | 0 |
| Jack Cust | 1 | 1 | 0 | .000 | 0 | 0 |

=== Starting pitchers ===
Note: G = Games pitched; IP = Innings pitched; W = Wins; L = Losses; ERA = Earned run average; SO = Strikeouts

| Player | G | IP | W | L | ERA | SO |
|---|---|---|---|---|---|---|
| Sidney Ponson | 33 | 215.2 | 11 | 15 | 5.30 | 115 |
| Daniel Cabrera | 28 | 147.2 | 12 | 8 | 5.00 | 76 |
| Érik Bédard | 27 | 137.1 | 6 | 10 | 4.59 | 121 |
| Eric DuBose | 14 | 74.2 | 4 | 6 | 6.39 | 48 |
| Matt Riley | 14 | 64.0 | 3 | 4 | 5.63 | 60 |
| Bruce Chen | 8 | 47.2 | 2 | 1 | 3.02 | 32 |
| Kurt Ainsworth | 7 | 30.2 | 0 | 1 | 9.68 | 20 |
| John Maine | 1 | 3.2 | 0 | 1 | 9.82 | 1 |

==== Other pitchers ====
Note: G = Games pitched; IP = Innings pitched; W = Wins; L = Losses; ERA = Earned run average; SO = Strikeouts

| Player | G | IP | W | L | ERA | SO |
|---|---|---|---|---|---|---|
| Rodrigo López | 37 | 170.2 | 14 | 9 | 3.59 | 121 |
| Dave Borkowski | 17 | 56.0 | 3 | 4 | 5.14 | 45 |

===== Relief pitchers =====
Note: G = Games pitched; W = Wins; L = Losses; SV = Saves; ERA = Earned run average; SO = Strikeouts

| Player | G | W | L | SV | ERA | SO |
|---|---|---|---|---|---|---|
| Jorge Julio | 65 | 2 | 5 | 22 | 4.57 | 70 |
| B.J. Ryan | 76 | 4 | 6 | 3 | 2.28 | 122 |
| Buddy Groom | 60 | 4 | 1 | 0 | 4.78 | 32 |
| John Parrish | 56 | 6 | 3 | 1 | 3.46 | 71 |
| Jason Grimsley | 41 | 2 | 4 | 0 | 4.21 | 21 |
| Mike DeJean | 37 | 0 | 5 | 0 | 6.13 | 36 |
| Eddy Rodríguez | 29 | 1 | 0 | 0 | 4.78 | 37 |
| Todd Williams | 29 | 2 | 0 | 0 | 2.87 | 13 |
| Rick Bauer | 23 | 2 | 1 | 0 | 4.70 | 37 |
| Darwin Cubillán | 7 | 0 | 0 | 0 | 5.40 | 8 |
| Aaron Rakers | 3 | 0 | 0 | 0 | 4.15 | 3 |
| Denny Bautista | 2 | 0 | 0 | 0 | 36.00 | 1 |

== Farm system ==
| Level | Team | League | Manager |
|---|---|---|---|
| AAA | Ottawa Lynx | International League | Tim Leiper |
| AA | Bowie Baysox | Eastern League | Dave Trembley |
| A | Frederick Keys | Carolina League | Tom Lawless |
| A | Delmarva Shorebirds | South Atlantic League | Bien Figueroa |
| A-Short Season | Aberdeen IronBirds | New York–Penn League | Don Buford |
| Rookie | Bluefield Orioles | Appalachian League | Gary Kendall |
