= 2004 Anaheim Angels season =

Major League Baseball season

2004 Anaheim Angels
- American League West champions
- League: American League
- Division: West
- Ballpark: Angel Stadium
- City: Anaheim, California
- Record: 92–70 (.568)
- Divisional place: 1st
- Owner: Arte Moreno
- General manager: Bill Stoneman
- Manager: Mike Scioscia
- Television: Fox Sports Net West; KCAL-9; KDOC; KPXN (PAX TV) •Rex Hudler, Steve Physioc; KWHY-TV (Spanish) •José Mota, Adrián García
- Radio: KSPN (AM 710) •Terry Smith, Rory Markas; KTNQ (AM 1020—Spanish) •José Mota, Ivan Lara
- Stats: ESPN.com; Baseball Reference

The 2004 Anaheim Angels season was the 44th season of the Los Angeles Angels franchise in the American League, the 39th in Anaheim, and their 39th season playing their home games at Angel Stadium. The Angels won their fourth American League West title, their first since 1986. Their playoff run was short, as they were quickly swept by the eventual World Series champion Boston Red Sox in the American League Division Series.

The season was notable for being the eighth and last season the Angels played under the "Anaheim Angels" moniker; owner Arte Moreno changed the team name to the controversial "Los Angeles Angels of Anaheim" moniker the following season. It was also notable as the season in which newly signed outfielder Vladimir Guerrero won the AL Most Valuable Player award, the first time an Angels player had been so honored since Don Baylor in 1979.

== Offseason ==
- October 27, 2003: Adam Riggs was signed as a free agent with the Anaheim Angels.
- November 24, 2003: Kelvim Escobar was signed as a free agent with the Anaheim Angels.
- January 14, 2004: Vladimir Guerrero was signed as a free agent with the Anaheim Angels.

== Regular season ==
=== Season standings ===
AL West
Team	W	L	Pct.	GB	Home	Road
Anaheim Angels	92	70	.568	—	45‍–‍36	47‍–‍34
Oakland Athletics	91	71	.562	1	52‍–‍29	39‍–‍42
Texas Rangers	89	73	.549	3	51‍–‍30	38‍–‍43
Seattle Mariners	63	99	.389	29	38‍–‍44	25‍–‍55

=== Record vs. opponents ===
2004 American League record Source: MLB Standings Grid – 2004
Team	ANA	BAL	BOS	CWS	CLE	DET	KC	MIN	NYY	OAK	SEA	TB	TEX	TOR	NL
Anaheim	—	6–3	4–5	5–4	4–5	7–2	7–0	5–4	5–4	10–9	13–7	6–1	9–10	4–5	7–11
Baltimore	3–6	—	10–9	2–4	3–3	6–0	6–3	4–5	5–14	0–7	7–2	11–8	5–2	11–8	5–13
Boston	5–4	9–10	—	4–2	3–4	6–1	4–2	2–4	11–8	8–1	5–4	14–5	4–5	14–5	9–9
Chicago	4–5	4–2	2–4	—	10–9	8–11	13–6	9–10	3–4	2–7	7–2	4–2	6–3	3–4	8–10
Cleveland	5–4	3–3	4–3	9–10	—	9–10	11–8	7–12	2–4	6–3	5–4	3–3	1–8	5–2	10–8
Detroit	2–7	0–6	1–6	11–8	10–9	—	8–11	7–12	4–3	4–5	5–4	3–3	4–5	4–2	9–9
Kansas City	0–7	3–6	2–4	6–13	8–11	11–8	—	7–12	1–5	2–7	2–5	3–6	4–5	3–3	6–12
Minnesota	4–5	5–4	4–2	10–9	12–7	12–7	12–7	—	2–4	2–5	5–4	4–5	5–2	4–2	11–7
New York	4–5	14–5	8–11	4–3	4–2	3–4	5–1	4–2	—	7–2	6–3	15–4	5–4	12–7	10–8
Oakland	9–10	7–0	1–8	7–2	3–6	5–4	7–2	5–2	2–7	—	11–8	7–2	11–9	6–3	10–8
Seattle	7–13	2–7	4–5	2–7	4–5	4–5	5–2	4–5	3–6	8–11	—	2–5	7–12	2–7	9–9
Tampa Bay	1–6	8–11	5–14	2–4	3–3	3–3	6–3	5–4	4–15	2–7	5–2	—	2–7	9–9	15–3
Texas	10–9	2–5	5–4	3–6	8–1	5–4	5–4	2–5	4–5	9–11	12–7	7–2	—	7–2	10–8
Toronto	5–4	8–11	5–14	4–3	2–5	2–4	3–3	2–4	7–12	3–6	7–2	9–9	2–7	—	8–10

=== Notable transactions ===
- May 30, 2004: Raúl Mondesí signed as a free agent with the Anaheim Angels.
- August 4, 2004: Raúl Mondesí was released by the Anaheim Angels.

==== Draft picks ====
- June 7, 2004: Pat White was drafted in the 4th round, 113th overall in the 2004 Major League Baseball Draft. White opted to play quarterback at the University of West Virginia.
- June 7, 2004: Freddy Sandoval was drafted by the Anaheim Angels in the 8th round of the 2004 amateur draft. Player signed June 29, 2004.

=== Roster ===
2004 Anaheim Angels
Roster
Pitchers: 65 Dusty Bergman; 21 Bartolo Colón; 53 Brendan Donnelly; 60 Scott Dunn; 45 Kelvim Escobar; 63 Kevin Gregg; 52 Matt Hensley; 41 John Lackey; 36 Ramón Ortiz; 40 Troy Percival; 57 Francisco Rodríguez; 34 Aaron Sele; 62 Scot Shields; 54 Derrick Turnbow; 56 Jarrod Washburn; 77 Ben Weber	Catchers: 1 Bengie Molina; 28 José Molina; 8 Josh Paul; Infielders: 5 Alfredo Amezaga; 22 David Eckstein; 17 Darin Erstad; 9 Chone Figgins; 43,20 Andrés Galarraga; 25 Troy Glaus; 18 Shane Halter; 2 Adam Kennedy; 35 Casey Kotchman; 23 Dallas McPherson; 39 Robb Quinlan	Outfielders: 16 Garret Anderson; 55 Jeff DaVanon; 27 Vladimir Guerrero; 6 José Guillén; 43 Raúl Mondesí; 19 Curtis Pride; 10 Adam Riggs; 15 Tim Salmon	Manager: 14 Mike Scioscia; Coaches: 24 Bud Black (pitching); 4 Alfredo Griffin (first base); 7 Mickey Hatcher (hitting); 70 Joe Maddon (bench); 88 Orlando Mercado (bullpen catcher); 12 Ron Roenicke (third base); 61 Steve Soliz (bullpen catcher)

== Player stats ==
= Indicates team leader

=== Batting ===
==== Starters by position ====
Note: Pos = Position; G = Games played; AB = At bats; R = Runs; H = Hits; HR = Home runs; RBI = Runs batted in; Avg. = Batting average; SB = Stolen bases

Pos	Player	G	AB	R	H	HR	RBI	Avg.	SB
C	Bengie Molina	97	337	36	93	10	54	.276	0
1B	Darin Erstad	125	495	79	146	7	69	.295	16
2B	Adam Kennedy	144	468	70	130	10	48	.278	15
SS	David Eckstein	142	566	92	156	2	35	.276	16
3B	Chone Figgins	148	577	83	171	5	60	.296	34
LF	José Guillén	148	565	88	166	27	104	.294	5
CF	Garret Anderson	112	442	57	133	14	75	.301	2
RF	Vladimir Guerrero	156	612	124	206	39	126	.337	15
DH	Troy Glaus	58	207	47	52	18	42	.251	2

==== Other batters ====
Note: G = Games; AB = At bats; H = Hits; Avg. = Batting average; HR = Home runs; RBI = Runs batted in

Player	G	AB	H	Avg.	HR	RBI
Jeff DaVanon	108	285	79	.277	7	34
José Molina	73	203	53	.261	3	25
Tim Salmon	60	186	47	.253	2	23
Robb Quinlan	56	160	55	.344	5	23
Casey Kotchman	38	116	26	.224	0	15
Shane Halter	46	114	23	.202	4	13
Alfredo Amézaga	73	93	15	.161	2	11
Josh Paul	46	70	17	.243	2	10
Dallas McPherson	16	40	9	.225	3	6
Curtis Pride	35	40	10	.250	0	3
Adam Riggs	16	36	7	.194	0	3
Raúl Mondesí	8	34	4	.118	1	1
Andrés Galarraga	7	10	3	.300	1	2

=== Pitching ===
==== Starting pitchers ====
Note: G = Games pitched; IP = Innings pitched; W = Wins; L = Losses; ERA = Earned run average; SO = Strikeouts

Player	G	IP	W	L	ERA	SO
Bartolo Colón	34	208.1	18	12	5.01	158
Kelvim Escobar	33	208.1	11	12	3.93	191
John Lackey	33	198.1	14	13	4.67	144
Jarrod Washburn	25	149.1	11	8	4.64	86
Aaron Sele	28	132.0	9	4	5.05	51

==== Other pitchers ====
Note: G = Games pitched; IP = Innings pitched; W = Wins; L = Losses; ERA = Earned run average; SO = Strikeouts

Player	G	IP	W	L	ERA	SO
Ramón Ortiz	34	128.0	5	7	4.43	82

===== Relief pitchers =====
Note: G = Games pitched; W = Wins; L = Losses: SV = Saves; ERA = Earned run average; SO = Strikeouts

Player	G	W	L	SV	ERA	SO
Troy Percival	52	2	3	33	2.90	33
Francisco Rodríguez	69	4	1	12	1.82	123
Scot Shields	60	8	2	4	3.33	109
Kevin Gregg	55	5	2	1	4.21	84
Brendan Donnelly	40	5	2	0	3.00	56
Ben Weber	18	0	2	0	8.06	11
Matt Hensley	16	0	2	0	4.88	30
Derrick Turnbow	4	0	0	0	0.00	3
Scott Dunn	3	0	0	0	9.00	2
Dusty Bergman	1	0	0	0	13.50	1

== ALDS ==
Boston wins the series, 3-0

Game	Score	Date
1	Boston 9, Anaheim 3	October 5
2	Boston 8, Anaheim 3	October 6
3	Boston 8, Anaheim 6 (10 innings)	October 8

== Farm system ==
Level	Team	League	Manager
AAA	Salt Lake Stingers	Pacific Coast League	Mike Brumley
AA	Arkansas Travelers	Texas League	Tyrone Boykin
A	Rancho Cucamonga Quakes	California League	Bobby Meacham
A	Cedar Rapids Kernels	Midwest League	Bobby Magallanes
Rookie	AZL Angels	Arizona League	Brian Harper
Rookie	Provo Angels	Pioneer League	Tom Kotchman

LEAGUE CHAMPIONS: Provo

Records
Preceded by 2003	Anaheim Angels seasons 2004	Succeeded by 2005
