= 2004 Tampa Bay Devil Rays season =

2004 Tampa Bay Devil Rays
- League: American League
- Division: East
- Ballpark: Tropicana Field
- City: St. Petersburg, Florida
- Record: 70–91 (.435)
- Divisional place: 4th
- Owners: Vince Naimoli
- General managers: Chuck LaMar
- Managers: Lou Piniella
- Television: FSN Florida; WXPX (Joe Magrane, Dewayne Staats)
- Radio: WFLA (Paul Olden, Charlie Slowes)

The 2004 Tampa Bay Devil Rays season was their seventh since the franchise was created. This season, they finished fourth in the American League East, 3 games ahead of the Toronto Blue Jays, who finished in last place. They managed to finish the season with a record of 70–91, finishing out of last for the first time in their 7-year history. Their manager was Lou Piniella who entered his second season with the Devil Rays.

== Regular season ==
=== Season standings ===
AL East
Team	W	L	Pct.	GB	Home	Road
New York Yankees	101	61	.623	—	57‍–‍24	44‍–‍37
Boston Red Sox	98	64	.605	3	55‍–‍26	43‍–‍38
Baltimore Orioles	78	84	.481	23	38‍–‍43	40‍–‍41
Tampa Bay Devil Rays	70	91	.435	30½	41‍–‍39	29‍–‍52
Toronto Blue Jays	67	94	.416	33½	40‍–‍41	27‍–‍53

=== Record vs. opponents ===
2004 American League record Source: MLB Standings Grid – 2004
Team	ANA	BAL	BOS	CWS	CLE	DET	KC	MIN	NYY	OAK	SEA	TB	TEX	TOR	NL
Anaheim	—	6–3	4–5	5–4	4–5	7–2	7–0	5–4	5–4	10–9	13–7	6–1	9–10	4–5	7–11
Baltimore	3–6	—	10–9	2–4	3–3	6–0	6–3	4–5	5–14	0–7	7–2	11–8	5–2	11–8	5–13
Boston	5–4	9–10	—	4–2	3–4	6–1	4–2	2–4	11–8	8–1	5–4	14–5	4–5	14–5	9–9
Chicago	4–5	4–2	2–4	—	10–9	8–11	13–6	9–10	3–4	2–7	7–2	4–2	6–3	3–4	8–10
Cleveland	5–4	3–3	4–3	9–10	—	9–10	11–8	7–12	2–4	6–3	5–4	3–3	1–8	5–2	10–8
Detroit	2–7	0–6	1–6	11–8	10–9	—	8–11	7–12	4–3	4–5	5–4	3–3	4–5	4–2	9–9
Kansas City	0–7	3–6	2–4	6–13	8–11	11–8	—	7–12	1–5	2–7	2–5	3–6	4–5	3–3	6–12
Minnesota	4–5	5–4	4–2	10–9	12–7	12–7	12–7	—	2–4	2–5	5–4	4–5	5–2	4–2	11–7
New York	4–5	14–5	8–11	4–3	4–2	3–4	5–1	4–2	—	7–2	6–3	15–4	5–4	12–7	10–8
Oakland	9–10	7–0	1–8	7–2	3–6	5–4	7–2	5–2	2–7	—	11–8	7–2	11–9	6–3	10–8
Seattle	7–13	2–7	4–5	2–7	4–5	4–5	5–2	4–5	3–6	8–11	—	2–5	7–12	2–7	9–9
Tampa Bay	1–6	8–11	5–14	2–4	3–3	3–3	6–3	5–4	4–15	2–7	5–2	—	2–7	9–9	15–3
Texas	10–9	2–5	5–4	3–6	8–1	5–4	5–4	2–5	4–5	9–11	12–7	7–2	—	7–2	10–8
Toronto	5–4	8–11	5–14	4–3	2–5	2–4	3–3	2–4	7–12	3–6	7–2	9–9	2–7	—	8–10

=== Notable transactions ===
- February 10, 2004: Midre Cummings was signed as a free agent with the Tampa Bay Devil Rays.
- July 30, 2004: Scott Kazmir was traded by the New York Mets with Jose Diaz to the Tampa Bay Devil Rays for Bartolomé Fortunato and Víctor Zambrano.
- August 19, 2004: Randall Simon was signed as a free agent with the Tampa Bay Devil Rays.
- September 10, 2004: Randall Simon was released by the Tampa Bay Devil Rays.

=== Roster ===
2004 Tampa Bay Devil Rays
Roster
Pitchers: 34 Paul Abbott; 28 Danys Báez; 41 Rob Bell; 45 Dewon Brazelton; 38 Lance Carter; 49 Jesús Colomé; 57 Bartolomé Fortunato; 50 Chad Gaudin; 43 Dicky Gonzalez; 54 Geremi González; 52 John Halama; 58 Travis Harper; 30 Mark Hendrickson; 57 Scott Kazmir; 51 Trever Miller; 32 Damian Moss; 47 Franklin Núñez; 31 Todd Ritchie; 46 Bobby Seay; 36 Jorge Sosa; 53 Jason Standridge; 40 Doug Waechter; 53 John Webb; 47 Víctor Zambrano	Catchers: 26 Brook Fordyce; 44 Toby Hall; Infielders: 11,27 Geoff Blum; 59 Jorge Cantú; 19 Aubrey Huff; 23 Julio Lugo; 24 Tino Martinez; 33 Eduardo Pérez; 8 Jason Romano; 1 Rey Sánchez; 35,9 B. J. Upton	Outfielders: 5 Rocco Baldelli; 59 José Bautista; 13 Carl Crawford; 22 José Cruz Jr.; 25 Matt Diaz; 43 Joey Gathright; 17 Charles Gipson; 10 Damian Rolls; Other batters: 20 Midre Cummings; 9 Robert Fick; 60 Jonny Gomes; 29 Fred McGriff; 35 Randall Simon	Manager: 14 Lou Piniella; Coaches: 4 Lee Elia (hitting); 6 Tom Foley (third base); 2 Billy Hatcher (first base); 55 Chuck Hernandez (pitching); 7 John McLaren (bench); 15 Matt Sinatro (bullpen); 56 Don Zimmer (advisor)

== Player stats ==
=== Batting ===
==== Starters by position ====
Note: Pos = Position; G = Games played; AB = At bats; H = Hits; Avg. = Batting average; HR = Home runs; RBI = Runs batted in

Pos	Player	G	AB	H	Avg.	HR	RBI
C	Toby Hall	119	404	103	.255	8	60
1B	Tino Martinez	138	458	120	.262	23	76
2B	Rey Sánchez	91	285	70	.246	2	26
SS	Julio Lugo	157	581	160	.275	7	75
3B	Aubrey Huff	157	600	178	.297	29	104
LF	Carl Crawford	152	626	185	.296	11	55
CF	Rocco Baldelli	136	518	145	.280	16	74
RF	José Cruz Jr.	153	545	132	.242	21	78
DH	Robert Fick	76	214	43	.201	6	26

==== Other batters ====
Note: G = Games played; AB = At bats; H = Hits; Avg. = Batting average; HR = Home runs; RBI = Runs batted in

Player	G	AB	H	Avg.	HR	RBI
Geoff Blum	112	339	73	.215	8	35
Jorge Cantú	50	173	52	.301	2	17
B.J. Upton	45	159	41	.258	4	12
Brook Fordyce	54	151	31	.205	2	9
Damian Rolls	53	117	19	.162	0	9
Fred McGriff	27	72	13	.181	2	7
Midre Cummings	22	54	15	.278	2	7
Joey Gathright	19	52	13	.250	0	1
Eduardo Pérez	13	38	8	.211	1	7
Matt Diaz	10	21	4	.190	1	3
Randall Simon	8	17	2	.118	0	0
Jonny Gomes	5	14	1	.071	0	1
José Bautista	12	12	2	.167	0	1
Jason Romano	4	8	1	.125	0	1
Charles Gipson	5	4	2	.500	0	0

=== Pitching ===
==== Starting pitchers ====
Note: G = Games pitched; IP = Innings pitched; W = Wins; L = Losses; ERA = Earned run average; SO = Strikeouts

Player	G	IP	W	L	ERA	SO
Mark Hendrickson	32	183.1	10	15	4.81	87
Victor Zambrano	23	128.0	9	7	4.43	109
Rob Bell	24	123.0	8	8	4.46	57
Dewon Brazelton	22	120.2	6	8	4.77	64
Doug Waechter	14	70.1	5	7	6.01	36
Geremi González	11	50.1	0	5	6.97	22
Paul Abbott	10	47.0	2	5	6.70	25
Scott Kazmir	8	33.1	2	3	5.67	41

==== Other pitchers ====
Note: G = Games pitched; IP = Innings pitched; W = Wins; L = Losses; ERA = Earned run average; SO = Strikeouts

Player	G	IP	W	L	ERA	SO
John Halama	34	118.2	7	6	4.70	59
Jorge Sosa	43	99.1	4	7	5.53	94
Jason Standridge	3	10.0	0	0	9.00	7
Todd Ritchie	4	8.0	0	2	9.00	4
Damian Moss	5	8.0	0	1	16.88	6

==== Relief pitchers ====
Note: G = Games pitched; W = Wins; L = Losses; SV = Saves; ERA = Earned run average; SO = Strikeouts

Player	G	W	L	SV	ERA	SO
Danys Báez	62	4	4	30	3.57	52
Trever Miller	60	1	1	1	3.12	43
Lance Carter	56	3	3	0	3.47	36
Travis Harper	52	6	2	0	3.89	59
Jesús Colomé	33	2	2	3	3.27	40
Chad Gaudin	26	1	2	0	4.85	30
Bobby Seay	21	0	0	0	2.38	17
Franklin Núñez	8	0	3	0	5.91	14
John Webb	4	0	0	0	7.00	9
Dicky Gonzalez	4	0	0	0	6.14	7
Bartolomé Fortunato	3	0	0	0	3.68	5

== Farm system ==
Level	Team	League	Manager
AAA	Durham Bulls	International League	Bill Evers
AA	Montgomery Biscuits	Southern League	Charlie Montoyo
A	Bakersfield Blaze	California League	Mako Oliveras
A	Charleston RiverDogs	South Atlantic League	Steve Livesey
A-Short Season	Hudson Valley Renegades	New York–Penn League	Dave Howard
Rookie	Princeton Devil Rays	Appalachian League	Jamie Nelson
