= Sam Marsonek =

American baseball player & coach (born 1978)

- Pitcher
- Born: July 10, 1978 (age 48); Tampa, Florida, U.S.
- Batted: Right Threw: Right

MLB debut
- July 11, 2004, for the New York Yankees

Last MLB appearance
- July 11, 2004, for the New York Yankees

MLB statistics
- Win–loss record: 0–0
- Earned run average: 0.00
- Strikeouts: 0
- Stats at Baseball Reference

Teams
- New York Yankees (2004)

Samuel Ryan Marsonek (born July 10, 1978) is an American former professional baseball pitcher. He played one game in Major League Baseball (MLB) for the New York Yankees in 2004.

== Professional career ==
Sam Marsonek was a 6'6" right handed pitcher out of Tampa, Florida. Sam was a graduate from Jesuit High School (FL) and was drafted as the 24th overall pick in the annual MLB First Player Draft in 1996, by the Texas Rangers. At the conclusion of the '99 season with the Rangers, Marsonek and Brandon Knight were traded to the New York Yankees in exchange for outfielder Chad Curtis. On July 8, 2004, after his sixth year in the Yankees organization, Marsonek was called up to the majors. Marsonek's MLB debut was July 11, 2004 where he came in to pitch in relief against the Tampa Bay Devil Rays, his hometown team. In this outing, Marsonek pitched 1 1/3 innings, giving up no earned runs on two hits. In 2007, Marsonek pitched in the independent Atlantic League for the Somerset Patriots. In 35 games (14 starts), he was 6-8 with a 5.03 ERA and 59 strikeouts. Marsonek was released from the Washington Nationals in 2008, ending his 12-year professional baseball career.

== Coaching career ==
After being released from his professional baseball contract, Marsonek was now searching for the next calling for his life. Sam eventually became a high school baseball coach, starting his career in Tampa, Florida at Cambridge Christian School. Marsonek spent the next four years coaching the Lancers, leading the team to two district titles, a regional championship and a state final four appearance. He was replaced by Sam Blackmon in May of 2013 after stepping down to work full-time with SCORE International. For the next few years, Score International baseball was a nationally ranked travel baseball program by Perfect Game USA. Marsonek, as the Director of SCORE International Baseball, was searching for a stable place to facilitate these outstanding players from across the world. In May 2016, Marsonek and his wife had the opportunity they were searching for; SCORE International took over Baseball Country, (formerly owned by Kenny and Angela Burns). Prior to the new position, Marsonek and his SCORE team had been bringing in missionaries along with carpentry teams to help out the area, using Baseball Country as their hub for what was already 10 years. Although there may be a change in scenery, the impact of Marsonek's coaching and directing under SCORE International baseball marked a great foundation for Baseball Country. Associated to Marsonek's coaching career is rosters filled with players from Florida, Canada, Dominican Republic, Venezuela, and the Bahamas, assisting over 85 of these players to attain a college scholarship and 27 to sign professional contracts.
