= Craig Dingman =

American baseball player (born 1974)

- Pitcher
- Born: March 12, 1974 (age 51); Wichita, Kansas, U.S.
- Batted: Right Threw: Right

MLB debut
- June 30, 2000, for the New York Yankees

Last MLB appearance
- September 28, 2005, for the Detroit Tigers

MLB statistics
- Win–loss record: 4–5
- Earned run average: 6.10
- Strikeouts: 50
- Stats at Baseball Reference

Teams
- New York Yankees (2000); Colorado Rockies (2001); Detroit Tigers (2004–2005)

Craig Allen Dingman (born March 12, 1974) is a former relief pitcher in Major League Baseball. He batted and threw right-handed.

== College career ==
Dingman attended Hutchinson Community College in Kansas.

== Professional career ==
He was drafted by the New York Yankees in the 36th round of the 1993 Major League Baseball draft and made his debut on June 30, 2000. On March 30, 2001, he was traded to the Colorado Rockies for Jorge DePaula. From 2002-2003, Dingman played in the Reds, Yankees, and Cubs organizations, and in Mexico.

Dingman signed with the Detroit Tigers organization as a minor league free agent before the start of the 2004 season. He earned a place in their bullpen that year, then took a large step forward in 2005, finishing with a 2–3 record and a 3.66 Earned run average.

While playing catch with a teammate on February 4, 2006, however, his throwing hand spontaneously became pale and his arm lost all circulation from the elbow down. After being placed on blood-thinning medication, he was diagnosed with a torn artery in his right shoulder, which led to arterial bypass surgery later that month. The operation removed an artery from his right and transplanted it into the injured shoulder, re-routing blood around the damaged vessel. It was the first procedure of its kind in the history of Major League Baseball.

He returned to the Detroit Tigers in early 2007 for testing on his throwing arm but suffered a blood clot and fatigue in his shoulder. He was released by the Tigers resulting in his final game being prior to his injury on 28 September 2005.

== Private life ==
Dingman was born in Wichita. In the off season, he lived there with his wife Teresa and their five children.

== Career after baseball ==
Dingman had worked in the construction and roofing industry prior to his baseball career. He returned to the construction industry, and, in 2014, he joined with a partner in Wichita, Kansas, to start a roofing construction company called Dingers Roofing & Construction.
