= Juan Cruz (baseball) =

Dominican baseball player (born 1978)

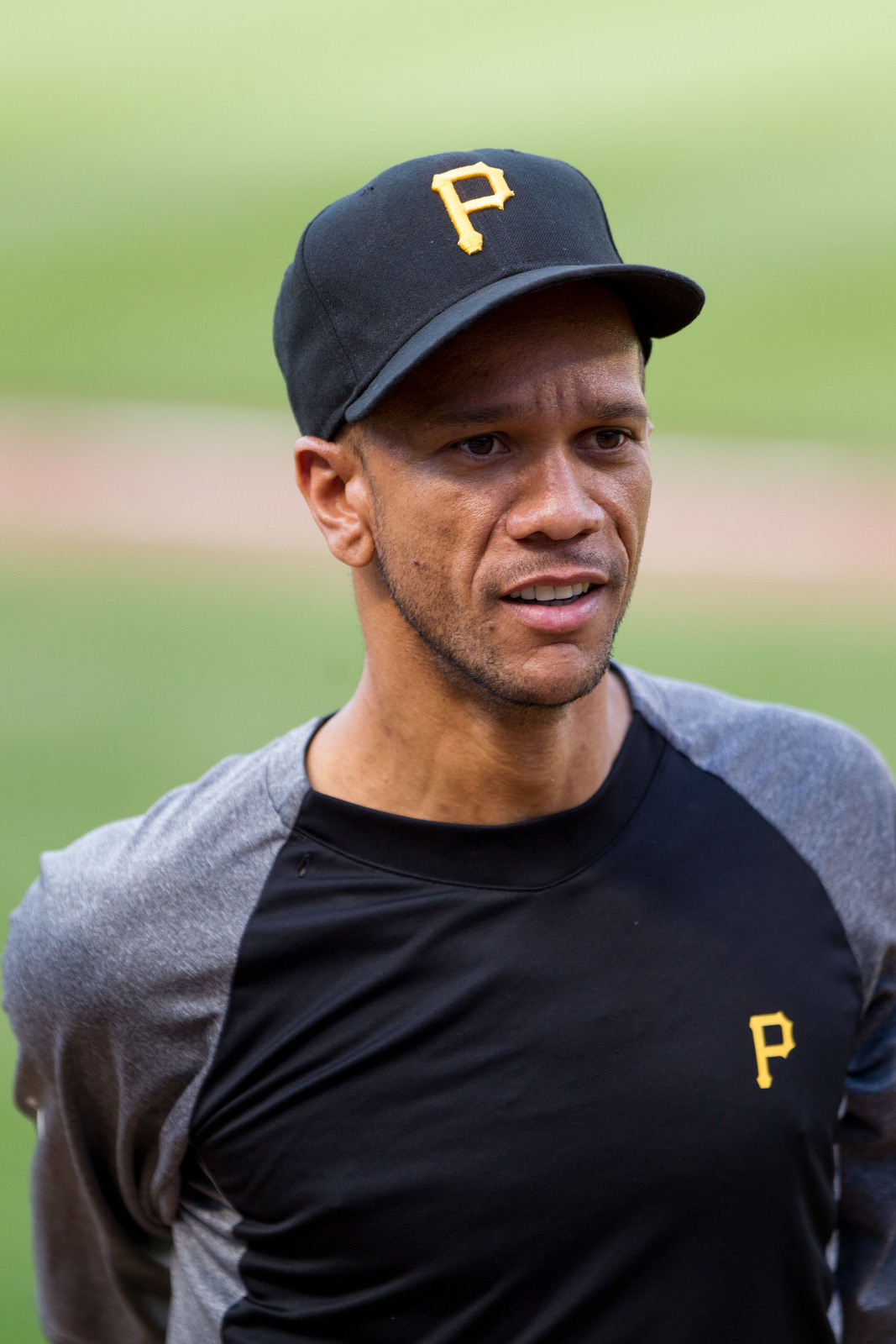
- Cruz with the Pittsburgh Pirates
- Pitcher
- Born: October 15, 1978 (age 47); Bonao, Dominican Republic
- Batted: Right Threw: Right

MLB debut
- August 21, 2001, for the Chicago Cubs

Last MLB appearance
- August 19, 2012, for the Pittsburgh Pirates

MLB statistics
- Win–loss record: 38–36
- Earned run average: 4.05
- Strikeouts: 659
- Stats at Baseball Reference

Teams
- Chicago Cubs (2001–2003); Atlanta Braves (2004); Oakland Athletics (2005); Arizona Diamondbacks (2006–2008); Kansas City Royals (2009–2010); Tampa Bay Rays (2011); Pittsburgh Pirates (2012)

Juan Carlos Cruz (born October 15, 1978) is a Dominican former professional baseball pitcher. He played in Major League Baseball for the Chicago Cubs, Atlanta Braves, Oakland Athletics, Arizona Diamondbacks, Kansas City Royals, Tampa Bay Rays, and Pittsburgh Pirates from 2001 to 2012.

== Early life ==
Cruz attended Janaco Bonao High School in Bonao.

== Career ==
=== Chicago Cubs ===
Cruz was signed for the Chicago Cubs by scout Jose Serra. He began his pro career with the Cubs' Rookie Level team, the Mesa Cubs, where he went 2–4 with a 6.10 earned run average and 36 strikeouts in only 41.1 innings pitched. Cruz went 5–6 with a 5.94 for Chicago's Single-A affiliate, the Eugene Emeralds, in 1999. Cruz split the 2000 season between the Single-A Lansing Lugnuts and Daytona Cubs. His combined stats for the year included an 8–5 record, a 3.27 ERA and 160 K's in 25 games and 140.1 innings. He also threw three complete games. Cruz made his big league debut for the Cubs on August 21, 2001, against the Milwaukee Brewers. He went 3–1 with a 3.22 ERA in his first 8 starts, and also recorded his first two major league hits on October 2. One of his highlights for the beginning of Cruz's season was that he was named to the All-Star Futures Team. Cruz went 3–11 with a 3.98 ERA in 45 games in 2002. He also picked up his first career save. He went 2–7 with a 6.05 ERA in 2003 in 6 starts with the Cubs. He started the year in the Cubs bullpen but was sent down to the Iowa Cubs on June 3. On Opening Day in 2003, Cruz struck out 6 consecutive batters, becoming only the second Cubs reliever to do so.

=== Atlanta Braves ===
On March 25, 2004, Cruz, along with Steve Smyth, were acquired by the Atlanta Braves, from the Chicago Cubs, for Andy Pratt and Richard Lewis. In 2004, with the Braves, Cruz went 6–2 with a 2.75 ERA in 50 relief appearances while setting a career high in wins and games pitched, and placed second in the Atlanta bullpen with 8.75 K's per 9 innings. Also, with runners in scoring position, opposing batters only hit .159 against him.

=== Oakland Athletics ===
On December 16, 2004, the Oakland Athletics acquired Cruz, along with Dan Meyer and Charles Thomas, from the Atlanta Braves, in exchange for Tim Hudson. In 2005, Cruz struggled in the beginning of the year and was sent down to Triple-A Sacramento in June. Cruz returned to the big-league team in September 2005 when rosters expanded, and he recorded a 4.82 ERA in his last 7 games of the season. His overall stats for the year were an 0–3 record and a 7.44 ERA with 34 strikeouts in 28 games in Oakland. After going 2–0 with 10.1 scoreless innings for Oakland in 2006 Spring Training, Cruz was dealt to the Arizona Diamondbacks for pitcher Brad Halsey.

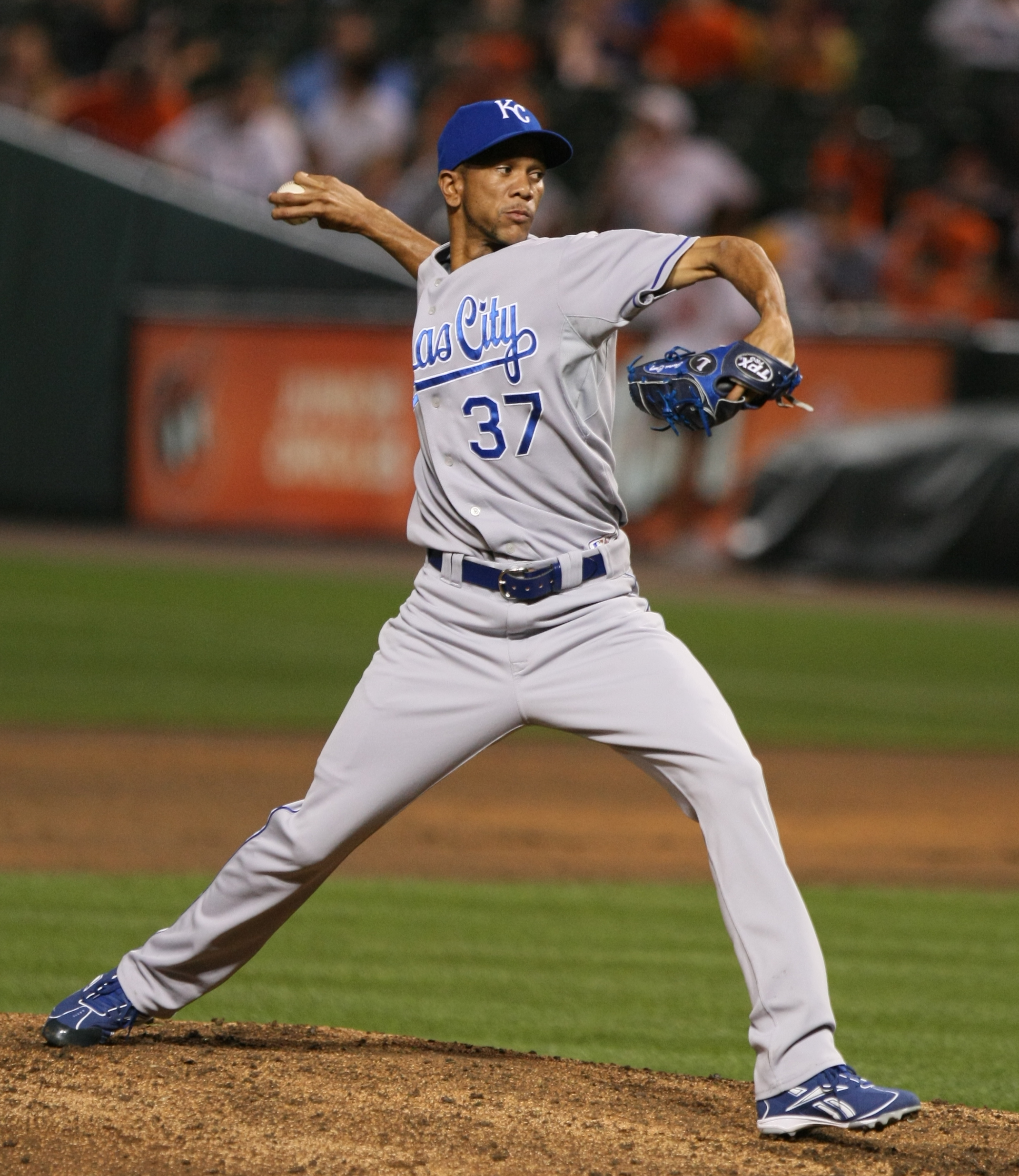
Cruz pitching for the Kansas City Royals in 2009.

=== Arizona Diamondbacks ===
In March 2006, the Oakland Athletics traded Cruz to the Arizona Diamondbacks for pitcher Brad Halsey. Cruz pitched in four scoreless outings for the D'backs in the spring after being traded. Cruz began the year in the starting rotation, and went 3–3 with a 4.05 ERA and 41 K's in 14 games, before being placed on the day-to-day disabled list with shoulder soreness on June 6. Two days later, he was moved to the 15-day DL. Cruz bounced between the bullpen and the rotation in 2006, but was used strictly out of the bullpen in 2007. He was on the disabled list for about three weeks from late-April to early-May 2007.

=== Kansas City Royals ===
On February 28, 2009, the Kansas City Royals signed Cruz to a two-year, $5.5 million contract with a club option for the 2011 season. On April 23, 2010, the Royals released Cruz.

=== Tampa Bay Rays ===
On February 3, 2011, the Tampa Bay Rays signed Cruz to a minor league contract.

=== Pittsburgh Pirates ===
Cruz signed a minor league contract with the Pittsburgh Pirates on February 1, 2012. He also received an invitation to spring training.

Cruz was called up prior to the season. On August 20, 2012, Cruz was designated for assignment. On August 23, 2012, Cruz refused his assignment to Triple-A and was released.

=== Philadelphia Phillies ===
On January 16, 2013, Cruz signed with the Philadelphia Phillies. But on February 13, 2013, before the first Spring Training workout began, the Phillies released Cruz after they mutually agreed to rescind their agreement.

== Pitching style ==
Cruz throws five pitches. His primary three pitches are a four-seam fastball (90–95), cut fastball (87–90), and slider (78–80). Though they are used less frequently, Cruz also has a changeup (82–85) and two-seam fastball (91–94).
