= Javier Vázquez (baseball) =

Puerto Rican baseball player (born 1976)

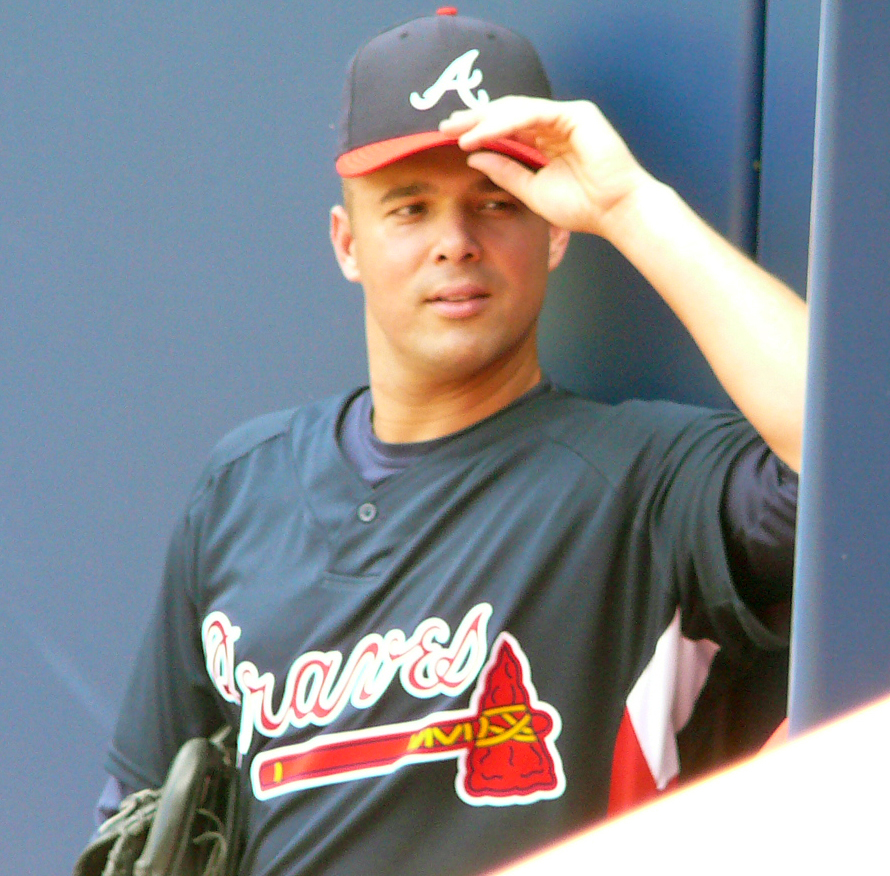
- Vázquez with the Braves in 2009
- Pitcher
- Born: July 25, 1976 (age 49); Ponce, Puerto Rico
- Batted: Right Threw: Right

MLB debut
- April 3, 1998, for the Montreal Expos

Last MLB appearance
- September 27, 2011, for the Florida Marlins

MLB statistics
- Win–loss record: 165–160
- Earned run average: 4.22
- Strikeouts: 2,536
- Stats at Baseball Reference

Teams
- Montreal Expos (1998–2003); New York Yankees (2004); Arizona Diamondbacks (2005); Chicago White Sox (2006–2008); Atlanta Braves (2009); New York Yankees (2010); Florida Marlins (2011)

Career highlights and awards
- All-Star (2004)

Javier Carlos Vázquez (born July 25, 1976) is a Puerto Rican former Major League Baseball starting pitcher. He played for the Montreal Expos (1998–2003), New York Yankees (2004, 2010), Arizona Diamondbacks (2005), Chicago White Sox (2006–2008), Atlanta Braves (2009), and Florida Marlins (2011).

== Personal life ==
Vázquez was born in Ponce, Puerto Rico. Vázquez is married to Kamille Vázquez. They have three children: Kamila, Javier Josué, and Kariana. Vázquez claims that he dislikes being the center of attention outside of the playing field and describes himself as a 'house man' spending his free time with his children. Vázquez is also interested in art pieces especially the ones that are produced by Puerto Rican artists and he possesses paintings by Wichie Torres and Iván Rosario. Vázquez has also expressed that he has always been interested in charity work, this interest was fueled by his parents as he states that a Christian upbringing and their support when he began practicing sports were part of this influence.

== Professional career ==
=== Minor Leagues ===
Vázquez was drafted by the Montreal Expos in the fifth round (140th overall) of the 1994 MLB draft. The same year, he began his professional career with the team's Rookie-level club in West Palm Beach, Florida, the GCL Expos. In 15 games (11 starts), Vázquez went 5–2 with a 2.53 ERA. He struck out 56 batters while walking 15 in a team-leading 67 2/3 innings pitched. In 1995, he was promoted to the Single-A Albany Polecats, where he finished 6–6 with a 5.08 ERA in 21 starts. In 102 2/3 innings pitched, he struck out 87 batters, but also walked 47. In 1996, while with the Single-A Delmarva Shorebirds, Vázquez went 14–3 with a 2.68 ERA in 27 starts. He pitched 164 1/3 innings with a team-leading 173 strikeouts and 57 walks. The following year, Vázquez started the season with the High-A West Palm Beach Expos, going 6–3 with a 2.16 ERA in 19 starts while striking out 100 and walking 28 in 112 2/3 innings. He was later promoted to the Double-A Harrisburg Senators, where he posted a perfect 4–0 record and a 1.07 ERA in six starts. In 42 innings pitched with Harrisburg, Vázquez struck out 47 batters and walked 12.

=== Montreal Expos (1998–2003) ===
Vázquez made his Major League debut for the Expos on April 3, 1998, against the Chicago Cubs, pitching five innings of three-run ball in the 6–2 loss. He picked up his first win on May 1 against the Arizona Diamondbacks, allowing three earned runs in 6 2/3 innings while striking out eight. He finished his rookie season appearing in 33 games (32 starts), compiling a 5–15 record and a 6.06 ERA. Vázquez pitched 172 1/3 innings, striking out 139 batters while walking 68.

In 1999, as part of a young Expos rotation of "twentysomething", "tall", "power" pitchers Vázquez started the season as the team's number three pitcher, but after recording a 6.63 ERA through June, he was sent to the Triple-A Ottawa Lynx. Upon his recall after the All-Star break, Vázquez turned things around, winning seven of his final 11 decisions and prompting ESPN to write that he had "turn[ed] the corner ... dramatically." On September 14 against the Los Angeles Dodgers, Vázquez tossed his first career shutout. He finished the year with 26 starts, going 9–8 with a 5.00 ERA while pitching 154 2/3 innings and recording 131 strikeouts. Vázquez was the losing pitcher when David Cone, of the New York Yankees, pitched a perfect game against the Expos on July 18, 1999.

In 2000, Vázquez again began the season as the Expos' number three starter. He was thought of as a promising young pitcher, and pitched the team's third game on April 5 against the Dodgers, striking out five batters while allowing two earned runs on eight hits across seven innings in a 6–5 Expos win. The Expos would win his following three starts and eight of his first eleven leaving the Expos at 27–23 on June 1. In the wake of injuries to pitchers Matt Blank, Mike Thurman and Hideki Irabu, Vázquez's 2.79 ERA, good for fourth-best in the NL, was noted as a key part to their success. After a sweep of the Baltimore Orioles and a win against the New York Yankees, the Expos were at 31–23, good for second place behind the Atlanta Braves in the NL East, and third in the entire National League. During his June 6 start, under pressure, Vázquez struck out seven batters in six innings, but he also walked four and gave up a home run to Bernie Williams in an 8–1 loss to the Yankees. The Expos would go on to lose seven of their next nine leaving them at 33–31, eighth in the National League. The Expos would finish 67–95, and Vázquez finished his season with an 11–9 record and a 4.05 ERA in 33 starts. He pitched 217 2/3 innings, striking out 196 while only walking 61. Vázquez was later invited to play in the 2000 Japanese All-Star Series.

By 2001, Vázquez had become the ace of the Expos pitching staff thought of as a "bright young star and an All-Star for years to come." On April 2, he opened the season in Chicago, pitching 5 2/3 innings while striking out five, but he also allowed four earned runs and walked three against the Cubs. The Expos won a close game, 5–4. He pitched better in his next start, the home opener at Olympic Stadium, striking out nine without issuing any walks across seven shutout innings in a 10–0 rout of the New York Mets. Vázquez would finish the season with 16–11 with a 3.42 ERA in 32 starts. In 223 2/3 innings pitched, he recorded 208 strikeouts while only walking 44 batters.

In 2002, Vázquez pitched 230 1/3 innings, striking out 179 batters while walking 49. He posted a 10–13 record with a 3.91 ERA in 34 starts. Despite this, he lost his arbitration case following the season and was awarded $6 million rather than his requested $7.15 million.

In 2003, Vázquez set career-highs with 230 2/3 innings pitched and 241 strikeouts. In 32 starts, he was 13–12 with a 3.24 ERA. Regarded as one of the league's top pitchers, he signaled to then GM Omar Minaya that he might not resign with the Expos, a team then threatened with contraction. Later, when asked by The New York Times about his experience in Montreal that year, he said it was tough "being over there having no owner. If you needed somebody the last couple years when we were in the hunt, especially last year, we couldn't get a player we needed." The article went on to note that for financial reasons the Expos not only couldn't "obtain players from other teams who might have helped the Expos stay in the wild-card race, but the Expos also weren't allowed to call up players from the minor leagues."

=== New York Yankees (2004) ===
On December 4, 2003, the New York Yankees agreed to acquire Vázquez from the Expos in exchange for Nick Johnson, Juan Rivera and Randy Choate. He later agreed to a four-year, $45 million deal through the 2007 season on January 5, 2004. Entering the season, The Hardball Times predicted him as their "consensus pick for the Cy Young".

After starting the season 9–5 with a 3.50 ERA, Vázquez was named a 2004 All-Star, replacing Oakland Athletics pitcher Tim Hudson. However, he struggled in the second half, and finished the season 14–10 with a 4.91 ERA in 32 starts. His struggles continued in the postseason, including a disappointing performance in Game 7 of the 2004 American League Championship Series, where Vázquez pitched two innings of relief, allowing three runs on two hits (both home runs to Johnny Damon) while walking five batters in a 10–3 loss.

=== Arizona Diamondbacks (2005) ===
On January 11, 2005, the Yankees traded Vázquez, Brad Halsey, and Dioner Navarro to the Arizona Diamondbacks in exchange for Randy Johnson. Johnson, then a 10-time All-Star, had won the National League Cy Young Award each year from 1999 to 2002 and had finished in second place in Cy Young voting that year (striking out a league high 290 batters with only 44 walks in 245 innings.)

As Arizona's Opening Day starter, Vázquez surrendered seven earned runs while striking out two without walking anyone in 1 2/3 innings, earning the loss in a 16–6 defeat to the Cubs. In 33 starts overall, he posted an 11–15 record and a 4.42 ERA while striking out 192 batters and walking 46 in 215 2/3 innings. In the month of May, he pitched 46 innings without walking a single batter. The stretch was broken at 54 innings in the fifth inning of a June 9 start against the Minnesota Twins.

After pitching the 2005 season with Arizona, Vázquez formally requested a trade from the team, asking for a location which was "easier for his family in Puerto Rico to visit."

=== Chicago White Sox (2006–2008) ===
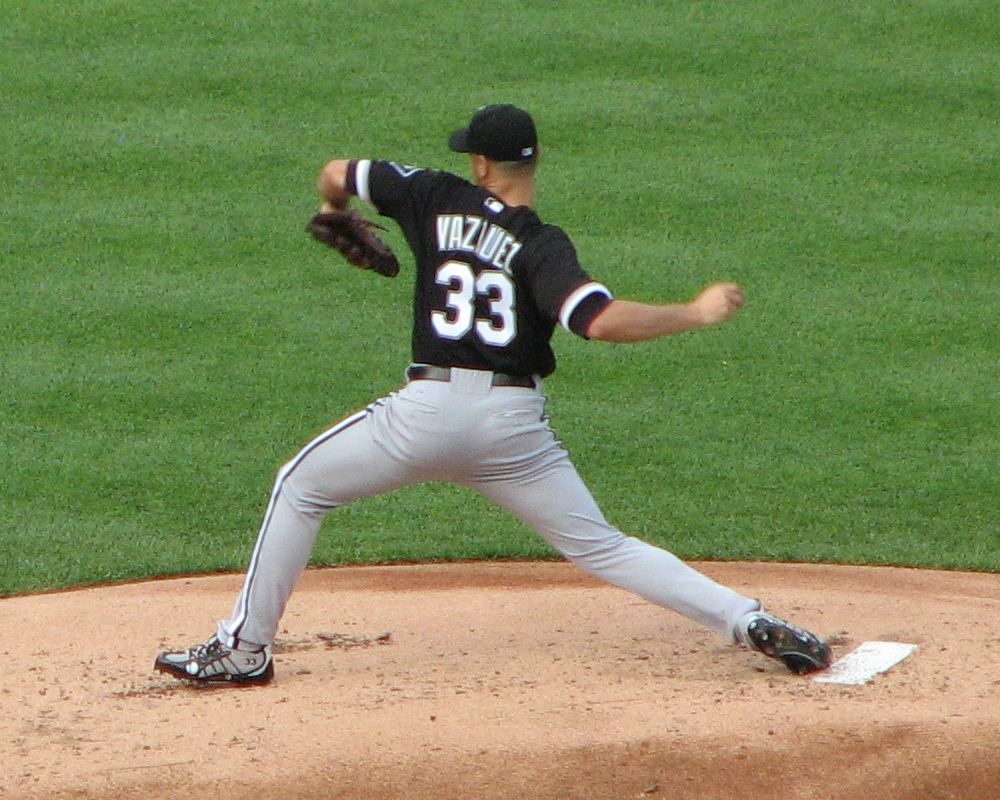
Vázquez with the White Sox in 2008

On December 20, 2005, Vázquez was traded to the Chicago White Sox for Orlando Hernández, Luis Vizcaíno, and Chris Young. In his first season with the White Sox, he was 11–12 with a 4.84 ERA in 33 games (32 starts).

Vázquez agreed to play for the Puerto Rico Team in the 2006 World Baseball Classic, joining fellow Puerto Rican players Carlos Delgado, Carlos Beltrán, Bernie Williams, amongst others representing the island in a team managed by St. Louis Cardinals third base coach Jose Oquendo.

For the 2007 season, Vázquez finished with a 15–8 with a 3.74 ERA in 32 starts. He struck out 213 and walked 50 in 216 2/3 innings pitched. He exceeded the 200-strikeout mark for the third time in his career, with the other two occasions being in 2001 and 2003. This season was the seventh season in his career where he had thrown at least 200 innings. The only season that he was not able to work this quantity of innings was in 2004 when Joe Torre, then manager of the New York Yankees decided to jump some turns in the team's rotation. Vázquez culminated that year with 198 innings. When asked about Javier's performance during the season in an interview, White Sox manager Ozzie Guillén noted that Vázquez had been throwing well for some time but the team had not been able to capitalize on this until it was too late in the season, specifically referring to the team's performance during the summer.

In 2008, Vázquez posted a 12–16 record and a 4.67 ERA in 33 starts. In the postseason, he started Game 1 of the 2008 American League Division Series against the Tampa Bay Rays, allowing six earned runs in 4 1/3 innings to earn the loss. The White Sox would later lose the series to the Rays in four games.

=== Atlanta Braves (2009) ===
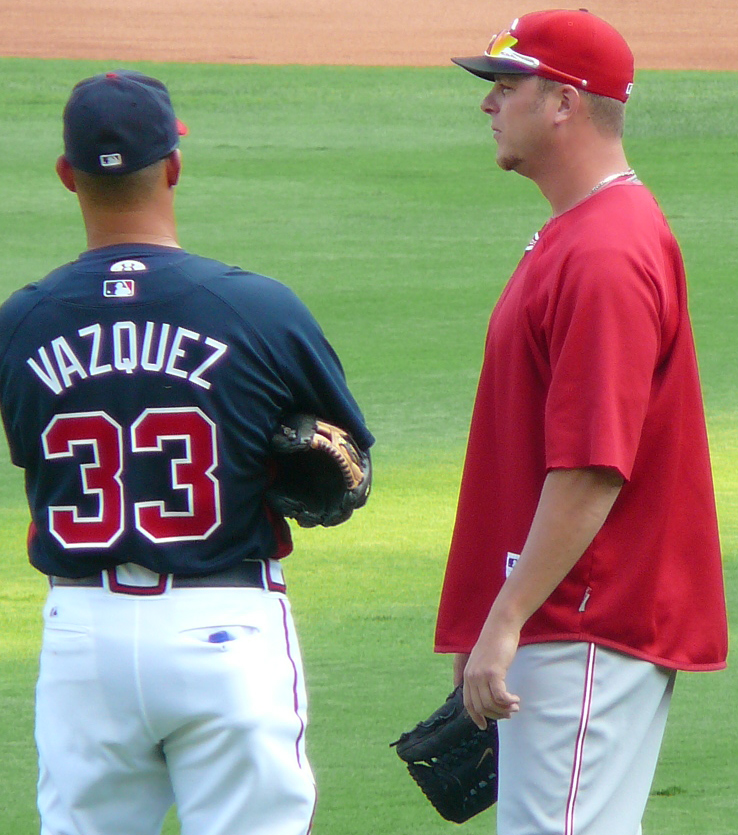
Vázquez (left) with former White Sox teammate Nick Masset in 2009

On December 4, 2008, Vázquez was traded along with Boone Logan to the Atlanta Braves for minor league catcher Tyler Flowers, shortstop Brent Lillibridge, third baseman Jon Gilmore and pitcher Santos Rodriguez. With the Braves in 2009, Vázquez had perhaps his most successful season, as he went 15–10 with a 2.87 ERA in 32 starts to go along with 238 strikeouts and 44 walks in 219 1/3 innings. He also led the majors in sacrifice hits, with 20.

Vázquez came in fourth place in the voting for the 2009 NL Cy Young Award after the season.

=== Second stint with the New York Yankees ===
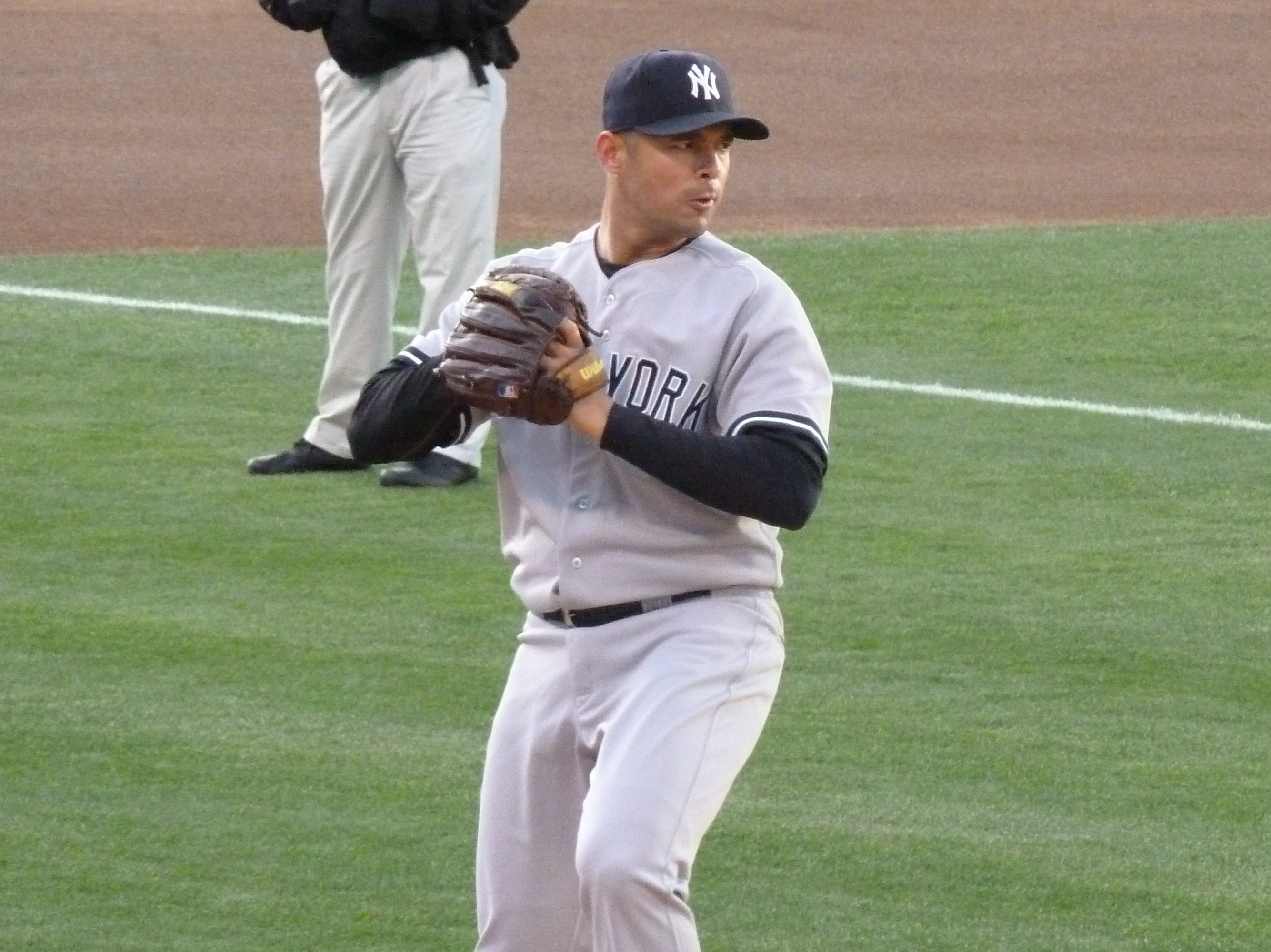
Vázquez with the Yankees in 2010

On December 22, 2009, the New York Yankees re-acquired Vázquez, this time from the Braves with LHP Boone Logan, in exchange for OF Melky Cabrera, LHP Mike Dunn and pitching prospect Arodys Vizcaíno. At this time, he was thought of as "one of the top starters in all of baseball" after what was thought of as being one of the best if not the best statistical seasons by a pitcher in 2009.

On July 21, 2010, Vázquez became the third active pitcher to beat all 30 MLB teams along with Barry Zito and Jamie Moyer. After struggling in August, the Yankees temporarily demoted Vázquez to the bullpen. In his second-to-last appearance of the season on September 23, 2010, he came into the game in relief against the Rays and proceeded to hit three batters in a row (tying a big-league record), while the Rays went on to score two runs on no hits. Vázquez finished the regular season with a 10–10 record and an ERA of 5.32 in 31 games (26 starts).

Due to his struggles in the regular season, the Yankees once again demoted Vázquez to the bullpen for him to be on the postseason roster. The Yankees won the 2010 ALDS against the Minnesota Twins in three games, but lost to the Texas Rangers in the 2010 ALCS in six games. Vázquez became a free agent after the season.

=== Florida Marlins (2011) ===
On November 28, 2010, Vázquez reached an agreement on a one-year, $7 million contract with the Florida Marlins. The deal was finalized on December 2. He began the season by going 3–6 with a 7.09 ERA through his first 13 games. After that, he went 10–5 with a 1.92 ERA the rest of the way.

He made his first start for the Marlins on April 3 against the Mets, allowing seven runs (four earned) on six hits while walking five in a shortened 2.1 inning start. In his first interleague start against the Rays, he struck out seven batters in seven innings while walking two in a 5–3 win in what was called his "best start of the year." Following this start, he continued to pitch well, striking out 20 and walking five (one intentional) in 19 2/3 innings in games at Los Angeles, Arizona and Florida. At the end of the season, Vázquez had a 29-inning scoreless streak, the longest in Marlins history, during which he struck out 28 batters while only walking four.

In his final game as a pitcher on September 27, Vázquez went the distance against the Washington Nationals. He allowed five hits and two runs while striking out nine batters on 97 pitches as the Marlins rallied in the ninth to win 3–2. In his final season, Vázquez posted a 13–11 record and a 3.69 ERA in 32 starts.

== Pitching style ==
Vázquez threw from a three-quarters arm slot with "good command of a running/sinking fastball" that, according to FanGraphs, overall averaged 91 mph. According to Josh Kalk of The Hardball Times. his fastball was "over 93 mph on average" in his peak. Kalk considered this particularly impressive considering his arm angle noting that "normally pitchers who have a very low release point sacrifice speed and vertical movement for horizontal movement." Kalk went on to note that Vázquez's fastball averaged nine inches of vertical movement "thanks to an exceptionally high spin rate on his fastball."

He also threw a "tight" slider which averaged 83 mph and "a big breaking curve-ball" which averaged 74 mph. His curveball was thought to be especially difficult to hit; in 2004, Sandy Alomar Jr. called it the "best breaking ball I've seen; Bert Blyleven doesn't throw it better [...] you don't know where it's going to land. He changes speeds with the breaking ball. He throws it hard. He throws it at you. He knows how to set you up." Kalk called it a "slurvy curve with huge horizontal movement and little vertical drop" noting that he "can add and subtract from a pitch that can like anything from one of his better sliders to a 65 mph beast with massive horizontal and vertical movement." Poet Carson Cistulli once wrote that "Javier Vázquez's curvepiece makes me a Better Man"

He featured two types of changeups: "one that darts like a cutter and one that resembles a screwball". Kalk noted an 11 mph difference between his fastball and changeup, FanGraphs a 10.5 mph average for his career (90.9 mph compared to 80.4 mph).

=== Fastball velocity ===
Baseball writer Dave Cameron writes in his piece "Javier Vázquez's Fastball Is Probably Not Coming Back" that beginning in 2010, Vazquez's fastball dropped from 91 mph to 89 mph and that "given his career workload, I wouldn’t bet on Vazquez's fastball ever coming back." In May, 2011, the Miami Herald noted that while Vázquez's velocity had been down, "now it is registering in the low 90s. When one fastball snapped his glove Friday, Buck said he glanced up at the reading on the Dodger Stadium scoreboard and saw 94." In June 2011, Joe Frisaro confirmed that his velocity had "increased" and that Vazquez's fastball was topping out "at a season-high 94 mph".

This was statistically confirmed in September by Eric Seidman: "from June 11 until now, Vazquez threw his fastball 53 percent of the time, and the pitch averaged 91.1 mph, right in line with his career".

== Post-baseball career ==
Vázquez was hired as an international special assistant to Major League Baseball Players Association executive director Tony Clark on April 30, 2014.

== See also ==
- List of Major League Baseball annual shutout leaders
- List of Major League Baseball career games started leaders
- List of Major League Baseball career strikeout leaders
- List of Major League Baseball players from Puerto Rico

Awards and achievements
Preceded by Greg Maddux; Cliff Lee	National League Pitcher of the Month; August 2001; September 2011	Succeeded by Woody Williams; Stephen Strasburg
