= Matt Hensley =

American baseball player (born 1978)

- Pitcher
- Born: August 18, 1978 (age 48); San Diego, California, U.S.
- Batted: Right Threw: Right

MLB debut
- May 4, 2004, for the Anaheim Angels

Last MLB appearance
- October 3, 2004, for the Anaheim Angels

MLB statistics
- Win–loss record: 0-2
- Earned run average: 4.88
- Strikeouts: 30
- Stats at Baseball Reference

Teams
- Anaheim Angels (2004)

Matthew Davis Hensley (born August 18, 1978) is an American former professional baseball pitcher. He played part of the 2004 season in Major League Baseball for the Anaheim Angels.

== Career ==
Hensley played college baseball at Grossmont College before being selected by the Anaheim Angels in the 10th round of the 2000 Major League Baseball draft.

In 2004, Hensley appeared in 16 games for the Angels, in which he went 0–2 with a 4.88 ERA and 30 strikeouts. In 2008, he played for the independent Southern Maryland Blue Crabs of the Atlantic League. On July 20, 2009, Hensley's contract was purchased by the Toronto Blue Jays organization, but he was released on August 19 after appearing in just eight games for the New Hampshire Fisher Cats.
