= Eddy Rodríguez (pitcher) =

Dominican baseball player (born 1981)

- Relief pitcher
- Born: August 8, 1981 (age 44); San Pedro de Macoris, Dominican Republic
- Batted: Right Threw: Right

MLB debut
- May 31, 2004, for the Baltimore Orioles

Last MLB appearance
- July 31, 2006, for the Baltimore Orioles

MLB statistics
- Win–loss record: 2–1
- Earned run average: 5.40
- Strikeouts: 48
- Stats at Baseball Reference

Teams
- Baltimore Orioles (2004, 2006)

Eddy Rodríguez (born August 8, 1981) is a Dominican former Major League Baseball (MLB) relief pitcher. From 2004 to 2006, Rodríguez pitched for the Baltimore Orioles organization in the Majors. He also pitched for the Florida Marlins.
