= Dusty Bergman =

American baseball player (born 1978)

- Relief pitcher
- Born: February 1, 1978 (age 48); Carson City, Nevada, U.S.
- Batted: Left Threw: Left

MLB debut
- June 9, 2004, for the Anaheim Angels

Last MLB appearance
- June 9, 2004, for the Anaheim Angels

MLB statistics
- Win–loss record: 0–0
- Earned run average: 13.50
- Strikeouts: 1
- Stats at Baseball Reference

Teams
- Anaheim Angels (2004)

Dustin Michael Bergman (born February 1, 1978) is an American former Major League Baseball left-handed pitcher who played for the Anaheim Angels in 2004.

Bergman attended the University of Hawaiʻi at Mānoa, and in 1998 he played collegiate summer baseball with the Cotuit Kettleers of the Cape Cod Baseball League.

Drafted by the Anaheim Angels in the 6th round of the 1999 Major League Baseball draft, Bergman would make his Major League Baseball debut with the Anaheim Angels on June 9, 2004. In 2006, Bergman pitched for the Columbus Clippers, the Triple-A affiliate of the New York Yankees, and the Fresno Grizzlies, the Triple-A affiliate of the San Francisco Giants.

Bergman signed with the independent Sioux City Explorers of the American Association on January 4, 2008. On July 16, he was claimed off waivers by the Lincoln Saltdogs.

From 2009 till 2011 he pitched in the German Bundesliga for the Heidenheim Heideköpfe. He now resides in Scottsdale, Arizona where he is a coach.
