= Aaron Rakers =

American baseball player (born 1977)

- Pitcher
- Born: January 22, 1977 (age 49); Highland, Illinois, U.S.
- Batted: Right Threw: Right

Professional debut
- MLB: September 8, 2004, for the Baltimore Orioles
- CPBL: March 31, 2009, for the LA New Bears

Last appearance
- MLB: April 19, 2007, for the San Diego Padres
- CPBL: August 12, 2010, for the LA New Bears

MLB statistics
- Win–loss record: 1-0
- Earned run average: 3.32
- Strikeouts: 14

CPBL statistics
- Win–loss record: 17–13
- Earned run average: 3.75
- Strikeouts: 176
- Stats at Baseball Reference

Teams
- Baltimore Orioles (2004–2005); San Diego Padres (2007); La New Bears (2009–2010)

Aaron James Rakers (/ˈrɒkərs/ ROK-ərs; born January 22, 1977) is an American former professional baseball pitcher. He attended Southern Illinois University Edwardsville and was drafted by the Baltimore Orioles in the 23rd round (697th overall) in 1999.

Rakers made his Major League Baseball (MLB) debut on September 8, 2004, pitching in three MLB games that season. In 2005, Rakers spent most of the year pitching for the Orioles Triple-A affiliate, the Ottawa Lynx, where he had 92 strikeouts and 21 walks in 77 innings with an ERA of 2.57. Rakers missed the entire 2006 season because of a torn labrum in his pitching shoulder and was non-tendered during the offseason. He was invited to spring training by the San Diego Padres in February 2007, but did not make the team and was optioned to the Padres Triple-A affiliate, the Portland Beavers. Rakers appeared in only one major league game and became a minor league free agent at the end of the season. Rakers signed with the Houston Astros for the 2008 season, but was released shortly after and signed with the York Revolution of the Atlantic League for the 2008 season.

In 2009, Rakers joined the La New Bears, one of the teams of Chinese Professional Baseball League (CPBL) in Taiwan. On March 31, Rakers won his first CPBL game, throwing 65 strikes and 36 balls over 6 innings. His career concluded in 2010 with the La New Bears.
