= Franklin Núñez =

Dominican baseball player (born 1977)

- Pitcher
- Born: January 18, 1977 (age 49); Nagua, Dominican Republic
- Batted: Right Threw: Right

MLB debut
- August 14, 2004, for the Tampa Bay Devil Rays

Last MLB appearance
- June 24, 2005, for the Tampa Bay Devil Rays

MLB statistics
- Win–loss record: 1-3
- Earned run average: 7.47
- Strikeouts: 16

CPBL statistics
- Win–loss record: 0–0
- Earned run average: 4.15
- Strikeouts: 1
- Stats at Baseball Reference

Teams
- Tampa Bay Devil Rays (2004–2005); Sinon Bulls (2009)

Franklin Núñez (born January 18, 1977) is a Dominican former Major League Baseball (MLB) pitcher.

== Career ==
He pitched in 2004 and 2005 for the Tampa Bay Devil Rays. He played for the Triple-A Richmond Braves in 2006 and the independent Atlantic League York Revolution in 2007, before being signed by the Milwaukee Brewers in August. He attended Brewers' minor league camp in 2008, but was released on March 23.

In February 2009, Núñez signed a minor league contract with the Colorado Rockies, where he spent the season before retiring.
