= Jorge DePaula =

Dominican baseball player (born 1978)

- Pitcher
- Born: November 10, 1978 (age 47); Sabana Grande de Boyá, Monte Plata, Dominican Republic
- Batted: Right Threw: Right

MLB debut
- September 5, 2003, for the New York Yankees

Last MLB appearance
- September 27, 2005, for the New York Yankees

MLB statistics
- Win–loss record: 0–1
- Earned run average: 4.00
- Strikeouts: 12
- Stats at Baseball Reference

Teams
- New York Yankees (2003–2005)

Jorge A. DePaula (born November 10, 1978) is a Dominican former right-handed pitcher who pitched 27 innings in Major League Baseball in 2003–05.

== 1997–2001 ==
On January 13, 1997, DePaula signed with the Colorado Rockies and pitched in their organization until April 20, 2001, when he was sent to the New York Yankees as the player to be named later for Craig Dingman.

== 2001–2006 ==
DePaula played in the Yankees minor leagues until 2003. After spending most of the year with the Triple-A Columbus Clippers. He pitched in Major League Baseball for the New York Yankees from 2003-2005. He first pitched for the team after September callups in the 2003 season, but his main presence was not known until the beginning of the 2004 season, when he was the team's fifth starter. However, after only one start and two relief appearances, it was clear that he needed Tommy John surgery, and did not pitch again at the major league level until September 2 of the next season.

== 2007–2012 ==
In 2007, DePaula pitched in the Rockies organization again, playing for the Double-A Tulsa Drillers and Triple-A Colorado Springs Sky Sox. On April 22, 2008, DePaula signed with the Edmonton Cracker-Cats of the Golden Baseball League. He played for Vaqueros Laguna of the Mexican League in 2012.
