= John Webb (baseball) =

American baseball player (born 1979)

- Pitcher
- Born: May 23, 1979 (age 46); Pensacola, Florida, U.S.
- Batted: Right Threw: Right

MLB debut
- August 2, 2004, for the Tampa Bay Devil Rays

Last MLB appearance
- April 20, 2005, for the Tampa Bay Devil Rays

MLB statistics
- Win–loss record: 0–1
- Earned run average: 10.38
- Strikeouts: 11

CPBL statistics
- Win–loss record: 0–1
- Earned run average: 5.52
- Strikeouts: 8
- Stats at Baseball Reference

Teams
- Tampa Bay Devil Rays (2004–2005); dmedia T-REX (2008)

John Floyd Webb (born May 23, 1979) is an American former Major League Baseball pitcher. He played in MLB from 2004-2005 for the Tampa Bay Devil Rays.

In 2007, Webb played for the Chicago Cubs Triple-A affiliate, the Iowa Cubs, and became a free agent after the season. In 2008, Webb pitched for the Pensacola Pelicans of the independent American Association.
