= Brad Halsey =

American baseball player (1981–2014)

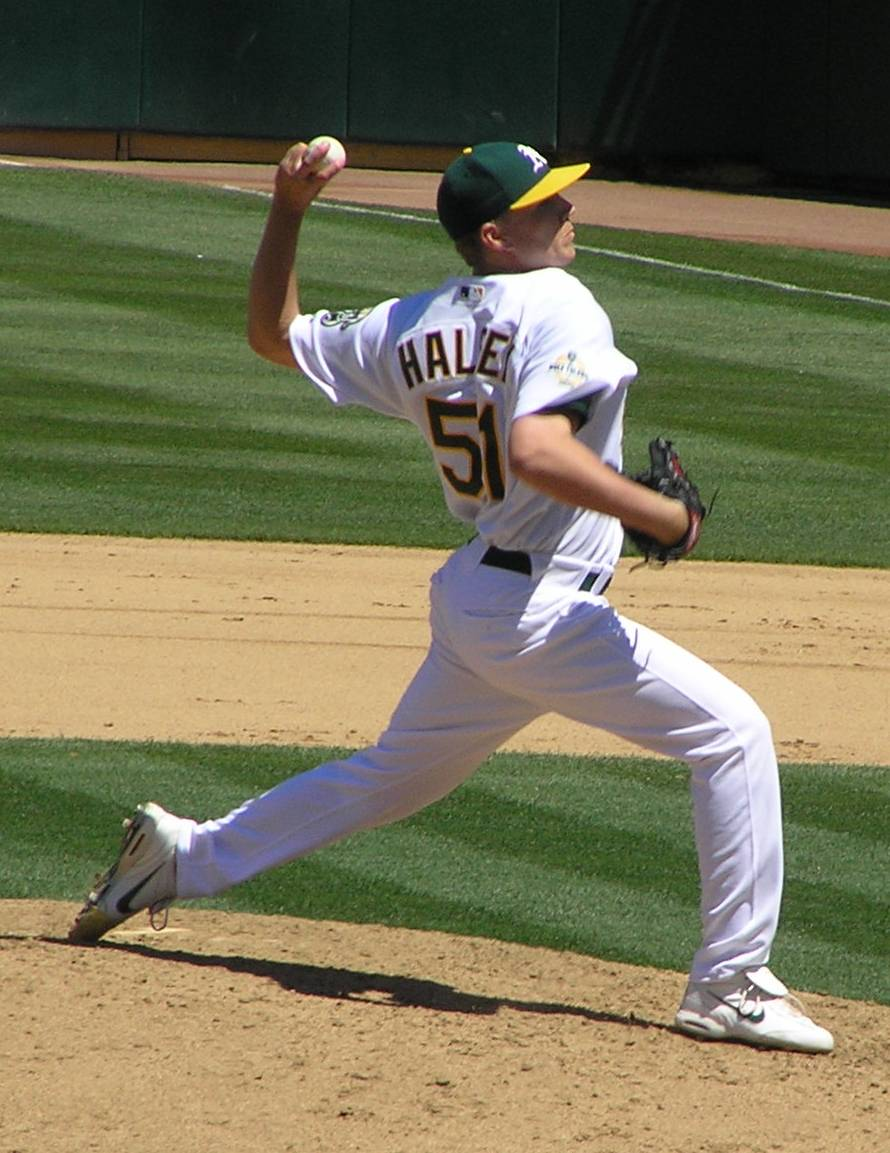
- Halsey in 2006
- Pitcher
- Born: February 14, 1981; Houston, Texas, U.S.
- Died: October 31, 2014 (aged 33); New Braunfels, Texas, U.S.
- Batted: Left Threw: Left

MLB debut
- June 19, 2004, for the New York Yankees

Last MLB appearance
- October 1, 2006, for the Oakland Athletics

MLB statistics
- Win–loss record: 14–19
- Earned run average: 4.84
- Strikeouts: 160
- Stats at Baseball Reference

Teams
- New York Yankees (2004); Arizona Diamondbacks (2005); Oakland Athletics (2006)

Bradford Alexander Halsey (February 14, 1981 – October 31, 2014) was an American professional baseball pitcher. He played in Major League Baseball for the New York Yankees in 2004, for the Arizona Diamondbacks in 2005, and for the Oakland Athletics in 2006.

== Amateur career ==
Halsey attended Westfield High School in Houston, Texas. He then attended Hill College where he dominated with 11 wins. Then enrolled at the University of Texas at Austin, where he was the ace starting pitcher for the Texas Longhorn baseball team. After the 2001 season, he played collegiate summer baseball with the Chatham A's of the Cape Cod Baseball League. With Halsey, the Longhorns won the 2002 College World Series.

== Professional career ==
=== New York Yankees (2002–2004) ===
The New York Yankees selected Halsey in the eighth round of the 2002 Major League Baseball draft. He signed with the Yankees, receiving a $130,000 signing bonus. Halsey spent most of the 2004 season with the Columbus Clippers of the Class AAA International League, pitching to an 11–4 win–loss record with a 2.63 earned run average (ERA) in 144 innings. He posted a 2.95 strikeout-to-walk ratio (109-to-37), while opponents batted .237 against him with eight home runs.

The Yankees gave him a spot in their pitching rotation on June 19, 2004. He won his first game against the Los Angeles Dodgers. In seven starts and a relief appearance, Halsey finished with a 1–3 record, 25 strikeouts, and a 6.47 ERA in 32 innings.

=== Arizona Diamondbacks (2005) ===
Before the 2005 season, the Arizona Diamondbacks traded pitcher Randy Johnson to the Yankees in a three-team deal which also included the Los Angeles Dodgers. Arizona received Halsey, pitcher Javier Vázquez, and catcher Dioner Navarro from New York, then sent Navarro and three minor league prospects to the Dodgers for outfielder Shawn Green. Halsey had an 8–10 record with the Diamondbacks in 2005.

=== Oakland Athletics (2006–2008) ===
On March 26, 2006, the Diamondbacks traded Halsey to the Oakland Athletics for Juan Cruz. Halsey made the Athletics' opening-day roster as a middle reliever, then was inserted into starting duty in May with space made available by injuries to starters Esteban Loaiza and Rich Harden. Halsey pitched in six starts, with a record of 1–2, an ERA of 5.63 and with opponents batting .305 against him.

On May 20, 2006, he threw the pitch that Barry Bonds hit out of the park for his 714th home run, tying Babe Ruth for second place on the all-time home run list. Halsey later joked about the specially marked balls for Bonds' at-bats. "They just have a B and a number on them, and a picture of Barry, too. If you look into his eye, he winks at you," Halsey said.

When Loaiza returned, Halsey returned to middle relief duty in mid-June. His statistics through mid-August were 3–3, 4.50 ERA. On August 10, Halsey was optioned to Oakland's Triple-A affiliate in Sacramento when the Athletics activated reliever Jay Witasick from the disabled list only to be recalled on August 22 with the A's needing a fifth starter in a string of consecutive games. He finished the year in middle relief. His statistics for the year were 5–4, 4.67 ERA. Halsey did not make the playoff roster for Oakland's division series against the Minnesota Twins. Oakland already had a left-hander in Joe Kennedy.

Halsey entered the 2007 season as a candidate for the fifth starter slot, but did not pitch well in spring training, going 0–3 with a 6.75 ERA, and lost out to Kennedy. On April 1, Halsey was again optioned, this time to Sacramento. On April 21, 2007, Halsey was held out of his start at Triple-A Sacramento, in case he was called to start for Rich Harden 3 days later. Harden could not go, but instead of Halsey, the A's went with left-hander Dallas Braden. Halsey made inflammatory comments that he was bypassed because the A's found out that Halsey was scheduled for an MRI exam. Halsey eventually did have surgery to repair a torn labrum in his shoulder on July 12, 2007, and was placed on the 60-day disabled list. The Athletics released Halsey in March 2008.

=== Later career ===
Halsey signed a minor league contract with the Los Angeles Dodgers in March 2009. Halsey was released by the Dodgers at the end of spring training. He signed a deal with the Long Island Ducks of the independent Atlantic League of Professional Baseball. Teammate Ron Flores later recalled that Halsey displayed anger and paranoia. In June 2009, Halsey disappeared for six days, and his mother filed a missing persons report. He reappeared the next day. With a 5.86 ERA in 11 starts, the Ducks released Halsey.

In 2010, he pitched for the Gary SouthShore RailCats of the independent Northern League. Halsey agreed on a minor league contract with the New York Yankees in 2011. They assigned him to the Trenton Thunder of the Class AA Eastern League. He pitched 31 1/3 innings for Trenton, and was released after the season.

== Scouting report ==
Halsey threw a fastball in the 87–90 miles per hour (140–145 km/h) range, but his best pitches were a fine slider and a deceptive changeup.

== Later life and death ==
In the summer of 2014, police responded to a call about a man throwing rocks at people. They found Halsey walking in chest-deep water in the Comal River, referring to himself as Lucifer and talking about fighting someone named "Mitch". Police restrained Halsey, and the police report made mention of mental health issues relating to drug abuse.

Halsey died on October 31, 2014, near his home in New Braunfels, Texas, at the age of 33. According to the local judge who ordered the autopsy, Halsey's fatal injuries were caused by either a jump or a fall from a 100-foot (30 m) cliff on private property. His body was discovered below, on a small road going up to the cliff. The autopsy showed that the cause of death was blunt force injuries from the fall. The Comal County Sheriff's Office believes that the fall was accidental, but kept the investigation open while awaiting the results of toxicology testing. Later toxicology reports showed that there were no traces of drugs or alcohol in his system at the time of his death.
