= Scott Dunn (baseball) =

American baseball player

- Pitcher
- Born: May 23, 1978 (age 48); San Antonio, Texas, U.S.
- Batted: Right Threw: Right

MLB debut
- September 11, 2004, for the Anaheim Angels

Last MLB appearance
- April 25, 2006, for the Tampa Bay Devil Rays

MLB statistics
- Win–loss record: 1–0
- Earned run average: 10.97
- Strikeouts: 6
- Stats at Baseball Reference

Teams
- Anaheim Angels (2004); Tampa Bay Devil Rays (2006)

Scott Allen Dunn (born May 23, 1978) is an American former Major League Baseball pitcher. After graduating from Winston Churchill High School in San Antonio, he attended the University of Texas at Austin. After college, he was drafted by the Cincinnati Reds.

Dunn played in the minors before appearing briefly with the Angels in 2004, and then reappearing in the majors with the Devil Rays in 2006.

He pitched in the Oakland Athletics minor league system in 2007, following the season, Dunn retired from professional baseball.

In August 2000, Dunn pitched a perfect game for the Clinton LumberKings, the fifth such achievement in Midwest League history.
