= Val Majewski =

American baseball player (born 1981)

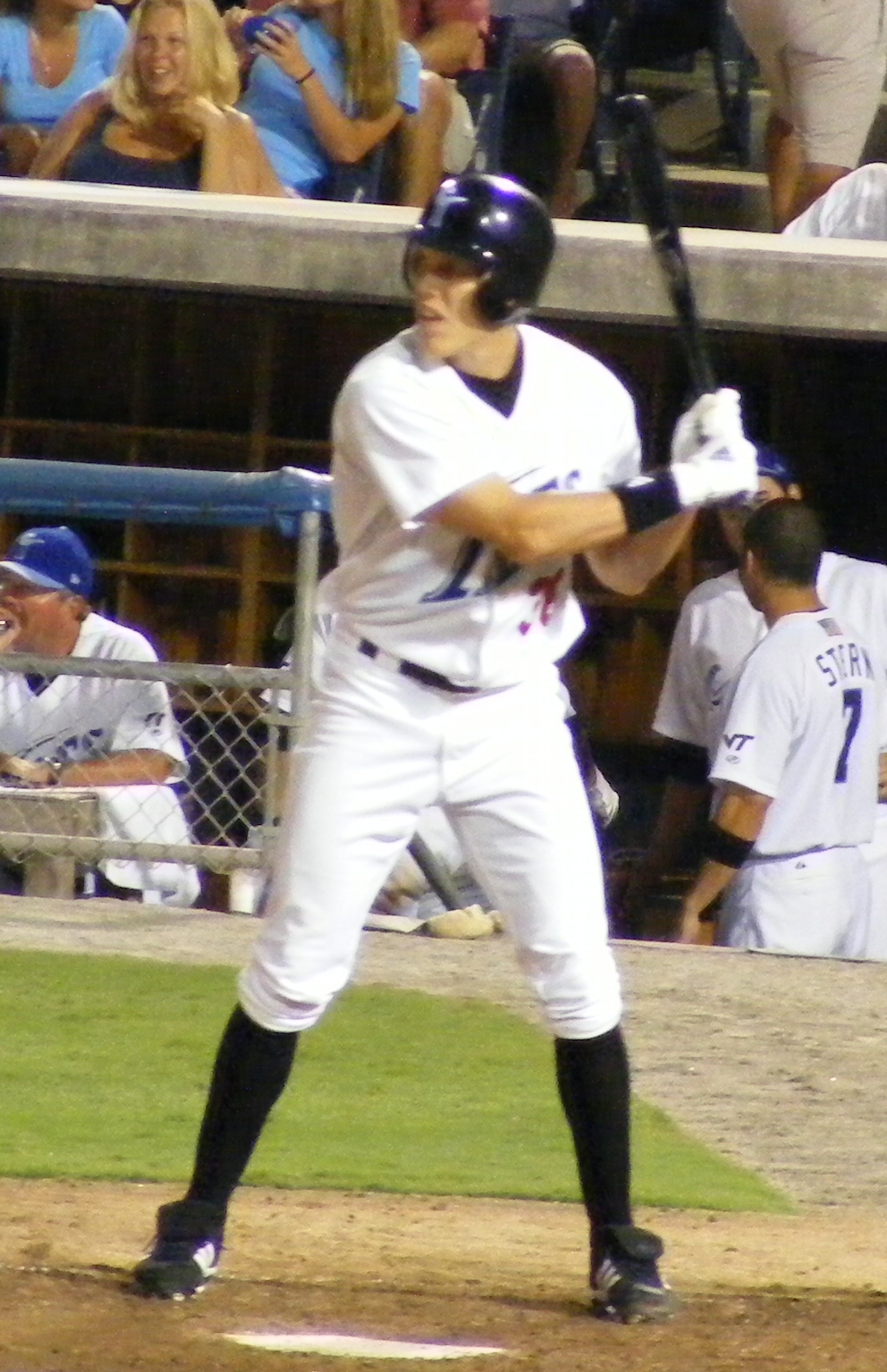
- Outfielder
- Born: June 19, 1981 (age 44); New Brunswick, New Jersey, U.S.
- Batted: Left Threw: Left

MLB debut
- August 20, 2004, for the Baltimore Orioles

Last MLB appearance
- September 8, 2004, for the Baltimore Orioles

MLB statistics
- Batting average: .154
- Home runs: 0
- Runs batted in: 1
- Stats at Baseball Reference

Teams
- Baltimore Orioles (2004)

Walter Val Majewski (pronounced my-EFF-skee) (born June 19, 1981) is an American former professional baseball outfielder. He played in Major League Baseball (MLB) for the Baltimore Orioles.

== Early life ==
Majewski grew up in Freehold Township, New Jersey, where he went to Freehold Township High School. He later attended Rutgers University. In 2001, he played collegiate summer baseball with the Falmouth Commodores of the Cape Cod Baseball League and was named a league all-star.

== Professional career ==
=== Baltimore Orioles ===
Majewski was the Orioles' third-round draft pick in 2002. He began his career with the Aberdeen IronBirds, but was soon promoted to the Delmarva Shorebirds. He played at four different minor league levels in 2003, finishing the year with the high-A Frederick Keys.

After a successful stint with the Double-A Bowie Baysox, he made his MLB debut for the Orioles on August 20, 2004, but suffered a torn labrum in his left shoulder and was limited to nine MLB games. Despite this, he was named the Orioles' Minor League Player of the Year for 2004. He spent the entire 2005 season on the disabled list.

The club originally thought that the shoulder would not require surgery, but after it failed to heal on its own, Majewski had surgery on it and was sidelined for the 2005 season. In 2006, played for the Ottawa Lynx. In 2007, Majewski split the season between Double-A Bowie and Triple-A Norfolk, but was released by the Orioles in March 2008.

=== Newark Bears ===
On April 23, 2008, Majewski signed with the Newark Bears of the Atlantic League.

=== Houston Astros ===
On June 22, 2008, Majewski signed a minor league contract with the Houston Astros and was assigned to Double-A Corpus Christi. In July, he was promoted to the Triple-A Round Rock Express. He became a free agent at the end of the season.

=== Camden Riversharks ===
Majewski began the 2009 season with the Camden Riversharks of the Atlantic League of Professional Baseball. In 28 appearances for the Riversharks, Majewski batted .310/.397/.460 with four home runs, 12 RBI, and six stolen bases.

=== Los Angeles Angels of Anaheim ===
On June 11, 2009, Majewski signed a minor league contract with the Los Angeles Angels of Anaheim organization, finishing the season with the Double-A Arkansas Travelers.

=== Oakland Athletics ===
In 2010, Majewski returned to the Atlantic League for the start of the season for the third straight season, this time with the York Revolution. Also for the third straight season, he hooked on with a major league organization partway through the season, signing a minor league contract with the Oakland Athletics on May 27. After finishing the season with the Double-A Midland RockHounds, he became a free agent.

=== York Revolution ===
Majewski signed with the York Revolution of the Atlantic League of Professional Baseball to begin the 2011 season. In 71 appearances for the Revolution, Majewski slashed .317/.398/.498 with 11 home runs, 48 RBI, and 10 stolen bases.

=== Texas Rangers ===
On July 25, 2011, Majewski signed a minor league contract with the Texas Rangers organization and was assigned to the Triple-A Round Rock Express. Following the completion of the Round Rock season, he requested and was given his release. He returned to the York Revolution which had made the Atlantic League playoffs.
