= List of Oakland Athletics Opening Day starting pitchers =

The Oakland Athletics were a Major League Baseball (MLB) team based in Oakland, California. They played in the American League West division. The club was founded in Philadelphia in 1901, moved to Kansas City, Missouri in 1955 and relocated to Oakland in 1968. The first game of the new baseball season for a team is played on Opening Day, and being named the Opening Day starter is an honor, which is often given to the player who is expected to lead the pitching staff that season, though there are various strategic reasons why a team's best pitcher might not start on Opening Day.

During their time in Oakland, the A's home field was the Oakland–Alameda County Coliseum, a multi-purpose stadium that has also been used for football, and soccer games. Commonly referred to as The Oakland Coliseum, or simply The Coliseum, it was formerly known as Oakland–Alameda County Coliseum (1966–1998, 2008–2011, 2016–2019, 2020, 2023–present), Network Associates Coliseum (1998–2004), McAfee Coliseum (2004–2008), Overstock.com Coliseum (2011), O.co Coliseum (2011–2016), and RingCentral Coliseum (2019–2020, 2020–2023) The A's played their 1996 Opening Day game at Cashman Field in Las Vegas, Nevada while repairs at the Oakland–Alameda County Coliseum were being completed, the first time in 39 years that a major league team played in a minor-league ballpark.

In Oakland, the A's used 36 different Opening Day starting pitchers in their 57 seasons. The 36 starters have a combined Opening Day record of 16 wins, 22 losses and 19 no decisions. No decisions are only awarded to the starting pitcher if the game is won or lost after the starting pitcher has left the game or if the starting pitcher pitches fewer than five innings. Of the 19 no decisions, the A's went on to win nine and lose ten of those games, for a team record on Opening Day of 25 wins and 32 losses.

The team played 41 of their Opening Day games at home: 37 at the Oakland–Alameda County Coliseum, 3 in Tokyo, and once in Las Vegas. Of the 37 games played in Oakland, the A's starting pitchers have a record of 12 wins, 11 losses and 14 no decisions (the team won nine and lost five of these no decisions). The 1996 game at Las Vegas' Cashman Field was a loss for starter Carlos Reyes. The 2008 game in the Tokyo Dome was a no decision for starter Joe Blanton that ended in an A's loss. The 2012 Tokyo Dome game resulted in a no decision for starter Brandon McCarthy and a loss for the team. Mike Fiers took the loss in the 2019 Tokyo Dome opener. Overall, the team's starting pitchers' record in home games is 12–13 (with 16 no decisions).

The A's advanced to the playoffs 21 times while in Oakland, winning the American League Championship Series six times and going on to win the World Series in 1972, 1973, 1974 and 1989. In the 21 seasons that the A's advanced to the playoffs, the team's Opening Day starting pitchers have had a record of eight wins, five losses and eight no decisions; the team ultimately won five and lost three of the no decisions. The team's starters won four and lost one Opening Day game in the six seasons they advanced to the World Series.

Catfish Hunter was the team's first Opening Day starter after the team moved to Oakland, taking a 3–1 loss to the Baltimore Orioles at Memorial Stadium in 1968.

The list will also include Opening Day starting pitchers for the Athletics in West Sacramento, California. The franchise played temporarily at Sutter Health Park between 2025 and 2027 before relocating to Las Vegas in 2028. During this period, the team was known simply as the Athletics.

== Key ==
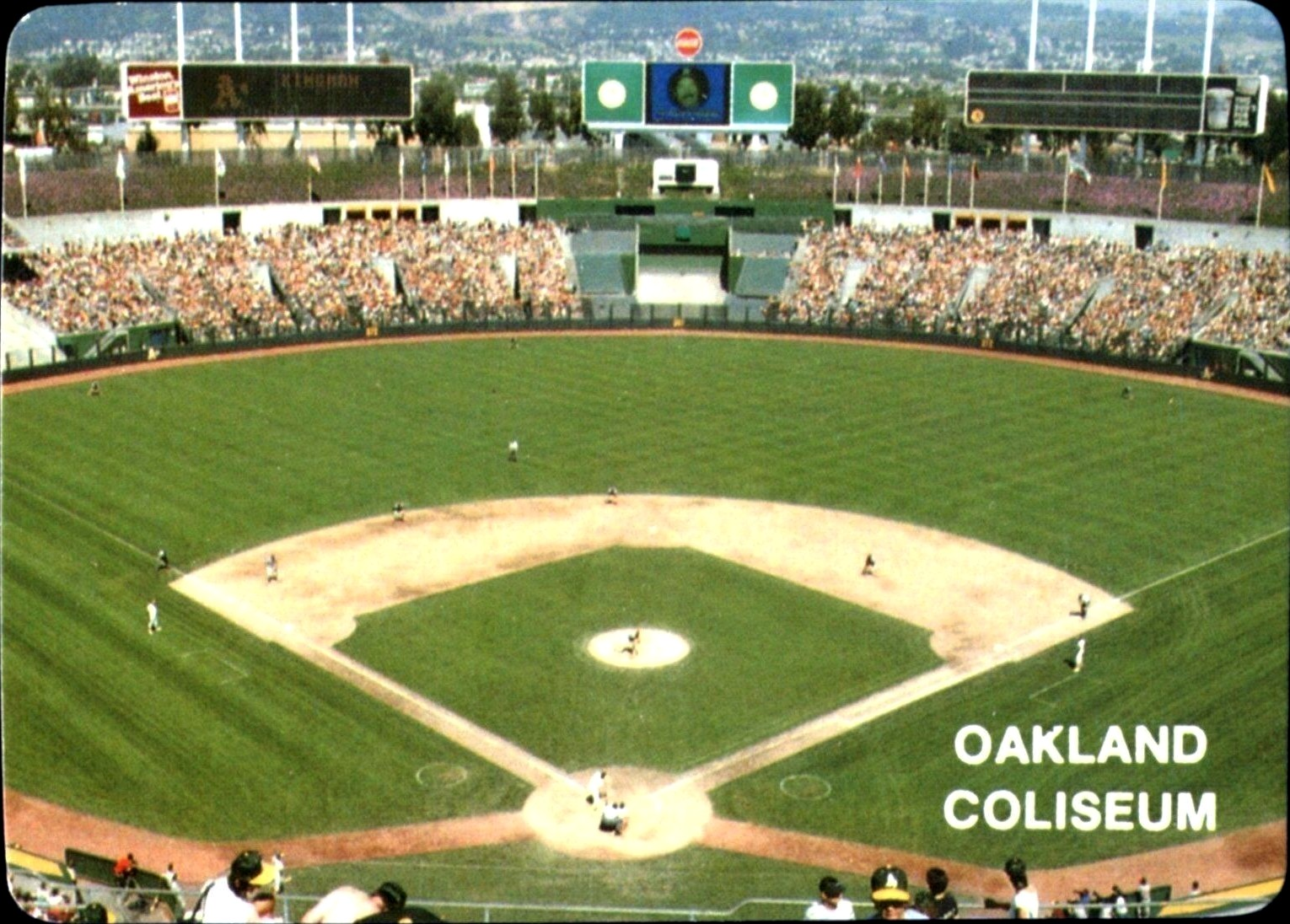
Oakland–Alameda County Coliseum, home of the Athletics from 1968 to 2024.

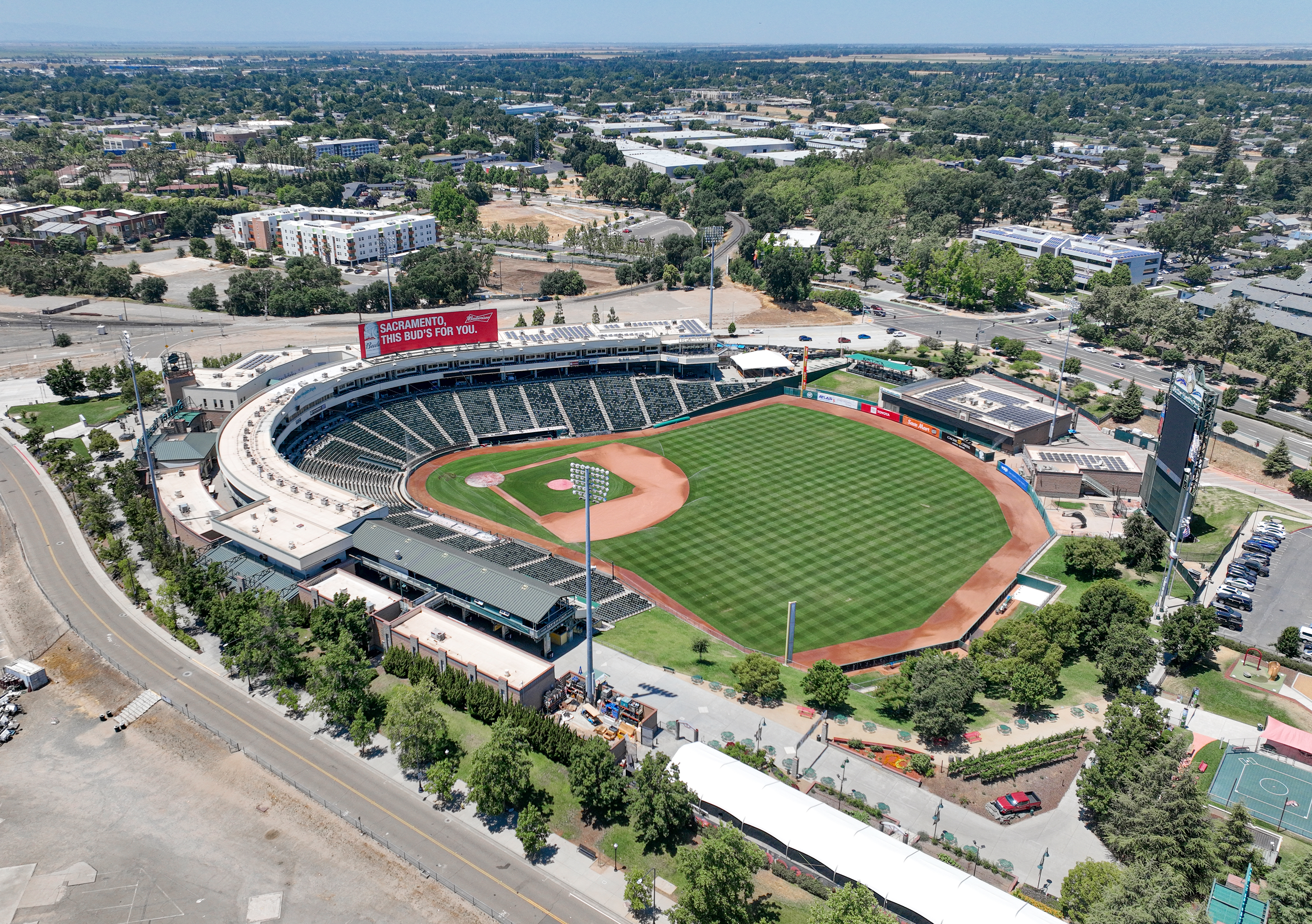
Sutter Health Park served as the temporary home of the Athletics from 2025 to 2027.

Season	Each year is linked to an article about that particular Athletics season.
W	Win
L	Loss
ND (W)	No decision by starting pitcher; Athletics won game
ND (L)	No decision by starting pitcher; Athletics lost game
Final Score (#)	Game score with Athletics runs listed first; in brackets are the number of innings over than 9
Location	**Stadium in bold** for home game
Pitcher (#)	Number of appearances as Opening Day starter with the Athletics
*	Advanced to the post-season
**	Won the American League Championship Series
***	World Series Champions

== Opening Day results ==
=== in Oakland ===
Season	Pitcher	Decision	Final score	Opponent	Location	Attendance	Ref.
1968	Catfish Hunter	L	1–3	Baltimore Orioles	Memorial Stadium	22,050	
1969	Blue Moon Odom	W	5–2	Chicago White Sox	**Oakland–Alameda County Coliseum**	23,610	
1970	Blue Moon Odom (2)	W	6–4	Kansas City Royals	Municipal Stadium	18,127	
1971*	Vida Blue	L	0–8	Washington Senators	Robert F. Kennedy Memorial Stadium	45,061	
1972***	Ken Holtzman	ND (W)	4–3	Minnesota Twins	**Oakland–Alameda County Coliseum**	9,912	
1973***	Catfish Hunter (2)	L	3–8	Minnesota Twins	**Oakland–Alameda County Coliseum**	38,207	
1974***	Catfish Hunter (3)	W	7–2	Oakland Athletics	Arlington Stadium	21,907	
1975	Vida Blue (2)	W	3–2	Chicago White Sox	**Oakland–Alameda County Coliseum**	17,477	
1976	Mike Torrez	W	5–2	California Angels	Angel Stadium	30,194	
1977	Mike Torrez (2)	W	7–2	Minnesota Twins	**Oakland–Alameda County Coliseum**	12,562	
1978	Rick Langford	L	0–1	California Angels	Angel Stadium	28,194	
1979	Rick Langford (2)	L	3–5	Minnesota Twins	**Oakland–Alameda County Coliseum**	10,387	
1980	Rick Langford (3)	ND (L)	7–9	Minnesota Twins	**Oakland–Alameda County Coliseum**	33,196	
1981	Mike Norris	W	5–1	Minnesota Twins	Metropolitan Stadium	42,658	
1982	Rick Langford (4)	ND (W)	3–2 (11)	California Angels	**Oakland–Alameda County Coliseum**	51,513	
1983	Rick Langford (5)	L	5–3	Cleveland Indians	**Oakland–Alameda County Coliseum**	34,831	
1984	Steve McCatty	ND (W)	6–5	Milwaukee Brewers	**Oakland–Alameda County Coliseum**	45,398	
1985	Chris Codiroli	L	3–6	Seattle Mariners	Kingdome	37,161	
1986	Chris Codiroli (2)	L	2–3	Cleveland Indians	**Oakland–Alameda County Coliseum**	44,726	
1987	Curt Young	ND (L)	4–5	Minnesota Twins	Hubert H. Humphrey Metrodome	43,548	
1988**	Dave Stewart	W	4–1	Seattle Mariners	**Oakland–Alameda County Coliseum**	45,333	
1989***	Dave Stewart (2)	W	3–2	Seattle Mariners	**Oakland–Alameda County Coliseum**	46,163	
1990**	Dave Stewart (3)	W	8–3	Minnesota Twins	**Oakland–Alameda County Coliseum**	48,219	
1991	Dave Stewart (4)	W	7–2	Minnesota Twins	**Oakland–Alameda County Coliseum**	44,373	
1992*	Dave Stewart (5)	ND (W)	5–3	Kansas City Royals	**Oakland–Alameda County Coliseum**	44,078	
1993	Bob Welch	W	9–4	Detroit Tigers	**Oakland–Alameda County Coliseum**	43,370	
1994	Bobby Witt	ND (L)	7–11	Milwaukee Brewers	Milwaukee County Stadium	52,012	
1995	Dave Stewart (6)	L	1–13	Toronto Blue Jays	SkyDome	50,426	
1996	Carlos Reyes	L	6–9	Toronto Blue Jays	**Cashman Field**	7,294	
1997	Ariel Prieto	ND (L)	7–9	Toronto Blue Jays	**Oakland–Alameda County Coliseum**	41,235	
1998	Tom Candiotti	L	0–2	Boston Red Sox	**Oakland–Alameda County Coliseum**	36,915	
1999	Gil Heredia	L	5–11	Detroit Tigers	**Oakland–Alameda County Coliseum**	46,650	
2000*	Kevin Appier	ND (W)	5–3	New York Yankees	**Oakland–Alameda County Coliseum**	46,380	
2001*	Tim Hudson	ND (L)	4–5	Seattle Mariners	Safeco Field	45,911	
2002*	Mark Mulder	W	8–3	Texas Rangers	**Oakland–Alameda County Coliseum**	43,908	
2003*	Tim Hudson (2)	W	5–0	Seattle Mariners	**Oakland–Alameda County Coliseum**	41,723	
2004	Tim Hudson (3)	ND (W)	5–4	Texas Rangers	**Oakland–Alameda County Coliseum**	45,122	
2005	Barry Zito	L	0–4	Baltimore Orioles	Oriole Park at Camden Yards	48,271	
2006*	Barry Zito (2)	L	2–15	New York Yankees	**Oakland–Alameda County Coliseum**	35,077	
2007	Dan Haren	L	0–4	Seattle Mariners	Safeco Field	46,003	
2008	Joe Blanton	ND (L)	5–6	Boston Red Sox	**Tokyo Dome**	44,628	
2009	Dallas Braden	L	0–3	Los Angeles Angels of Anaheim	Angel Stadium of Anaheim	43,220	
2010	Ben Sheets	ND (L)	3–5	Seattle Mariners	**Oakland–Alameda County Coliseum**	30,686	
2011	Trevor Cahill	ND (L)	2–6	Seattle Mariners	**Oakland–Alameda County Coliseum**	36,067	
2012*	Brandon McCarthy	ND (L)	1–3	Seattle Mariners	**Tokyo Dome**	44,227	
2013*	Brett Anderson	L	0–2	Seattle Mariners	**O.co Coliseum**	36,067	
2014*	Sonny Gray	ND (L)	0–2	Cleveland Indians	**O.co Coliseum**	36,067	
2015	Sonny Gray (2)	W	8–0	Texas Rangers	**O.co Coliseum**	36,067	
2016	Rich Hill	L	3–4	Chicago White Sox	**Oakland Coliseum**	35,067	
2017	Kendall Graveman	W	4–2	Los Angeles Angels	**Oakland Coliseum**	36,067	
2018*	Kendall Graveman (2)	ND (W)	6–5	Los Angeles Angels	**Oakland Coliseum**	27,764	
2019*	Mike Fiers	L	6–9	Seattle Mariners	**Tokyo Dome**	45,787	
2020*	Frankie Montas	ND (W)	6–3	Los Angeles Angels	**Oakland Coliseum**	N/A (Note: The 2020 season was played without fans in attendance due to the COVID-19 pandemic.)	
2021	Chris Bassitt	L	1–8	Houston Astros	**RingCentral Coliseum**	10,436	
2022	Frankie Montas (2)	L	5–9	Philadelphia Phillies	Citizens Bank Park	44,232	
2023	Kyle Muller	ND (W)	2–1	Los Angeles Angels	**RingCentral Coliseum**	26,805	
2024	Alex Wood	L	0–8	Cleveland Guardians	**Oakland Coliseum**	13,522	

=== in West Sacramento ===
Season	Pitcher	Decision	Final score	Opponent	Location	Attendance	Ref.
2025	Luis Severino	ND (L)	2–4	Seattle Mariners	T-Mobile Park	42,871	
2026	Luis Severino (2)	ND (L)	2–3	Toronto Blue Jays	Rogers Centre	42,728	

== Pitchers ==
Opening Day starting pitchers listed in descending order by the number of Opening Day starts for the A's in Oakland and Sacramento:

Pitcher	Starts	Wins	Losses	No Decisions	Winning %	Seasons
Dave Stewart	6	4	1	1	.800	1988, 1989, 1990, 1991, 1992, 1995
Rick Langford	5	0	3	2	.000	1978, 1979, 1980, 1982, 1983
Catfish Hunter^{[a]}	3	1	2	0	.333	1968, 1973, 1974
Tim Hudson	3	1	0	2	1.000	2001, 2003, 2004
Blue Moon Odom	2	2	0	0	1.000	1969, 1970
Vida Blue	2	1	1	0	.500	1971, 1975
Mike Torrez	2	2	0	0	1.000	1976, 1977
Chris Codiroli	2	0	2	0	.000	1985, 1986
Barry Zito	2	0	2	0	.000	2005, 2006
Sonny Gray	2	1	0	1	.500	2014, 2015
Kendall Graveman	2	1	0	1	.500	2017, 2018
Frankie Montas	2	0	1	1	.000	2020, 2022
Luis Severino	2	0	0	2	.000	2025, 2026
Ken Holtzman	1	0	0	1	.000	1972
Mike Norris	1	1	0	0	1.000	1981
Steve McCatty	1	0	0	1	.000	1984
Curt Young	1	0	0	1	.000	1987
Bob Welch	1	1	0	0	1.000	1993
Bobby Witt	1	0	0	1	.000	1994
Carlos Reyes	1	0	1	0	.000	1996
Ariel Prieto	1	0	0	1	.000	1997
Tom Candiotti	1	0	1	0	.000	1998
Gil Heredia	1	0	1	0	.000	1999
Kevin Appier	1	0	0	1	.000	2000
Mark Mulder	1	1	0	0	1.000	2002
Danny Haren	1	0	1	0	.000	2007
Joe Blanton	1	0	0	1	.000	2008
Dallas Braden	1	0	1	0	.000	2009
Ben Sheets	1	0	0	1	.000	2010
Trevor Cahill	1	0	0	1	.000	2011
Brandon McCarthy	1	0	0	1	.000	2012
Brett Anderson	1	0	1	0	.000	2013
Rich Hill	1	0	1	0	.000	2016
Mike Fiers	1	0	1	0	.000	2019
Chris Bassitt	1	0	1	0	.000	2021
Kyle Muller	1	0	0	1	.000	2023
Alex Wood	1	0	1	0	.000	2024

== Footnotes ==
- **^{a}** Catfish Hunter also had one Opening Day start for the Kansas City Athletics in 1966, giving him a total of four Opening Day starts with the franchise. Hunter got the loss in his Opening Day start in 1966.
