= Barry Zito =

American baseball player (born 1978)

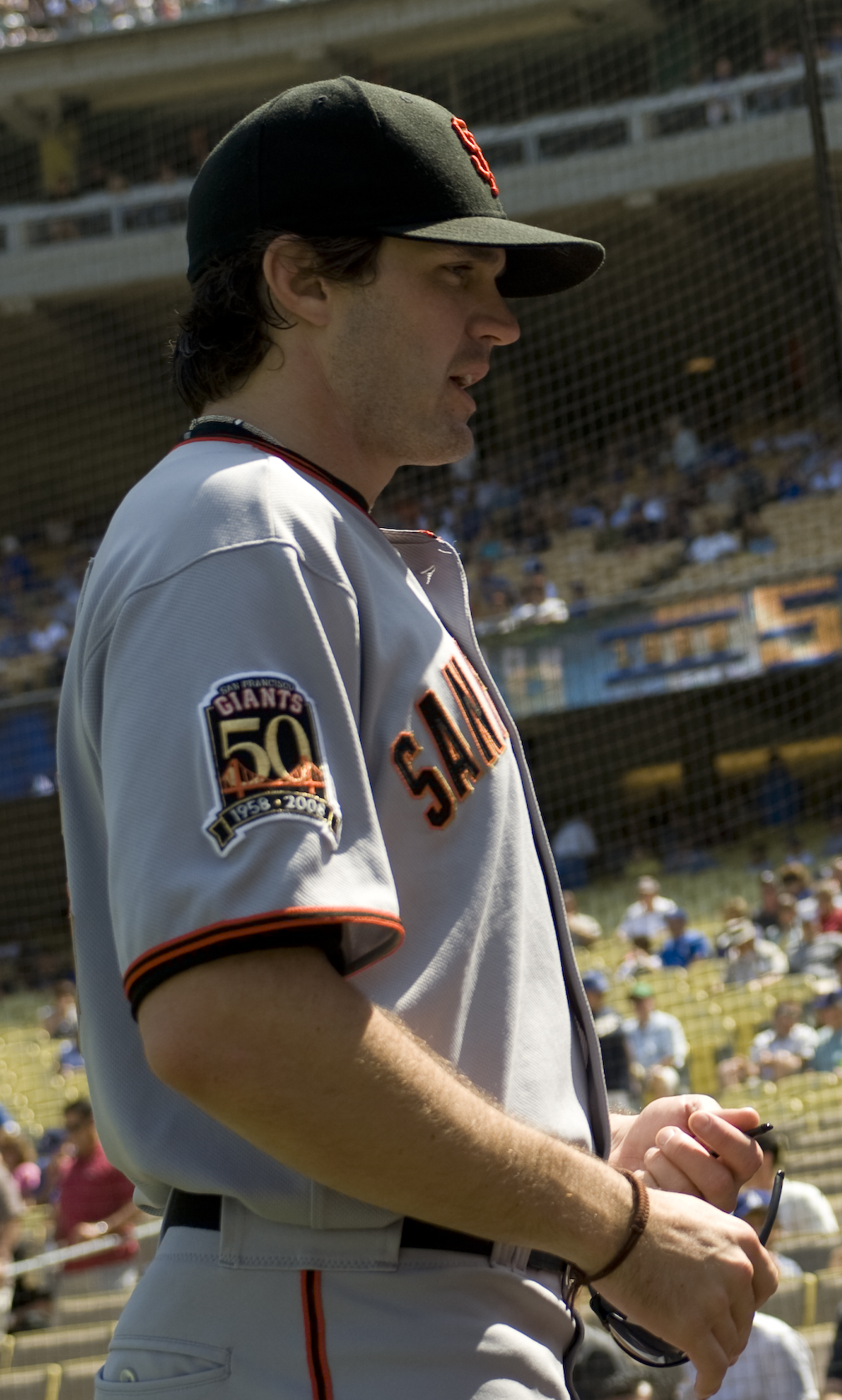
- Zito with the San Francisco Giants in 2008
- Pitcher
- Born: May 13, 1978 (age 48); Las Vegas, Nevada, U.S.
- Batted: Left Threw: Left

MLB debut
- July 22, 2000, for the Oakland Athletics

Last MLB appearance
- September 30, 2015, for the Oakland Athletics

MLB statistics
- Win–loss record: 165–143
- Earned run average: 4.04
- Strikeouts: 1,885
- Stats at Baseball Reference

Teams
- Oakland Athletics (2000–2006); San Francisco Giants (2007–2013); Oakland Athletics (2015)

Career highlights and awards
- 3× All-Star (2002, 2003, 2006); World Series champion (2012); AL Cy Young Award (2002); AL wins leader (2002); Athletics Hall of Fame

Barry William Zito (born May 13, 1978) is an American former professional baseball pitcher. A left-hander, Zito pitched for the Oakland Athletics and San Francisco Giants during a 15-year Major League Baseball (MLB) career. Zito led the American League in wins and won the AL Cy Young Award in 2002. A three-time All-Star known for his curveball, Zito won a World Series ring with the Giants in 2012.

Zito attended the University of California, Santa Barbara, Los Angeles Pierce College, and the University of Southern California. Drafted three times while in college, Zito signed with the Athletics when they chose him in the first round of the 1999 MLB draft. A year later, he was in the major leagues, finishing sixth in American League (AL) Rookie of the Year Award voting. He struggled to begin the 2001 season but improved greatly down the stretch, finishing the year with a 17-8 win–loss record. He went 23-5 with a 2.75 ERA in 2002, leading the AL in wins and winning the AL Cy Young Award. In the early 2000s, Zito and fellow Athletics starting pitchers Tim Hudson and Mark Mulder were known as the Big Three. Zito posted a 102-63 record and a 3.58 ERA during his tenure with the Athletics, and he made the AL All-Star team in 2002, 2003, and 2006.

Following his seventh season with the Athletics, Zito became a free agent. He signed a seven-year, $126 million contract with the Giants in December 2006. At that time, the contract was the largest contract ever signed by an MLB pitcher. Zito is known for having underperformed his contract; in seven seasons with the Giants, he accumulated a 63-80 record with an ERA of 4.62. He led the National League with 17 losses in 2008. In 2010, San Francisco won the World Series; however, Zito struggled during the last month of the season and was left off the postseason roster. Zito sat out much of the 2011 season with a foot and ankle injury. He finished the 2012 season with a 15–8 record, his best in a Giants uniform. That October, Zito helped lead the Giants to the 2012 World Series title. He won Game Five of the NLCS against the St. Louis Cardinals and defeated Detroit Tigers ace Justin Verlander in Game One of the World Series, setting the stage for San Francisco's Series sweep. Zito struggled in 2013 and became a free agent following the season. After sitting out the 2014 season, he returned to the Athletics for three games in 2015 before retiring.

A philanthropist, Zito founded Strikeouts for Troops, a national non-profit that provides the comforts of home and lifts the spirits and morale of injured troops as well as offering support to military families.

== Early life and education ==
Barry William Zito was born May 13, 1978, in Las Vegas, Nevada, to Roberta (née Rosser; 1943–2008) and Joe Zito (1928–2013). He is of Italian descent. He has two sisters who are nine and 13 years older than he is, respectively. His family moved to San Diego, California to help him concentrate on his baseball career after he showed signs of promise from a very young age. Not knowing much about baseball, his father began reading books about pitching strategy and even stopped working to help coach his son. At the age of 12, Randy Jones, a former Cy Young Award winner, was hired by his father to give him lessons at $50 an hour. He transferred from El Cajon's Grossmont High School, where he was the star pitcher, to University of San Diego High School, a Roman Catholic private school for his senior year. Zito received many league honors there, posting an 8–4 record with a 2.92 ERA while racking up 105 strikeouts in just 85 innings.

== College career ==
Zito then attended UC Santa Barbara where he earned Freshman All-America Honors with 125 strikeouts in 85 1/3 innings. In his sophomore season, Zito transferred to Los Angeles Pierce College so that he could be eligible for the Major League Baseball draft. At Pierce, he posted a 2.62 earned run average (ERA), went 9–2 with 135 strikeouts in 103 innings, and was named to the all-state and all-conference teams. He then transferred to the University of Southern California (USC), where he was a first-team All-America selected by USA Today Baseball Weekly, Collegiate Baseball, and Baseball America. With a 12–3 record, a 3.28 ERA, and 154 strikeouts in 113 2/3 innings, Zito was named Pac-10 Pitcher of the Year.

Zito also played in the Cape Cod Baseball League, a summer wooden bat league that showcases the nation's top amateur prospects. He led the Wareham Gatemen to the league championship in 1997 and was named a league all-star and led the team to a runner-up finish in 1998.

== Professional career ==
=== Drafts and minor leagues ===
Zito was taken by the Seattle Mariners in the 59th round (1,586th overall) of the 1996 Major League Baseball (MLB) draft, and in the third round (83rd overall) by the Texas Rangers in 1998, but did not sign with either team. In the 1999 draft, he was selected by the Oakland Athletics with the ninth pick of the first round, and signed for a $1.59 million bonus.

In 1999, Zito began his professional career with the Visalia Oaks, Oakland's A team. He went 3–0 with a 2.45 ERA in eight starts. He struck out 62 in 40 1/3 innings. Zito was promoted to the Midland RockHounds and went 2–1 with a 4.91 ERA to finish the AA schedule. He then got one start for the AAA Vancouver Canadians (PCL), allowing a lone run with six strikeouts in six innings.

Zito began the 2000 season in AAA with the Sacramento River Cats (the Canadians franchise had moved to Sacramento). He pitched 101 2/3 innings in 18 starts, going 8–5 with a 3.19 ERA, 91 strikeouts, and 41 walks.

=== Oakland Athletics (2000–2006) ===
==== 2000 ====
Zito made his major league debut on July 22, 2000, against the Anaheim Angels wearing #53. He allowed one run in five innings, and got the win. In his next start, Zito went seven innings while giving up three runs to the Boston Red Sox. Zito continued to have great success early in his rookie season. In his third career start, he went seven innings and gave up one run against the Toronto Blue Jays. On September 10, Zito pitched his first complete game shutout against the Tampa Bay Devil Rays. He threw 110 pitches, struck out eight, and allowed five hits. During September, he went 5–1 with a 1.73 ERA. Zito finished with a 7–4 record and a 2.72 earned run average in 14 starts. Despite his late start to the season, Zito still received a vote for the American League (AL) Rookie of the Year Award voting, finishing in a 4-way tie for sixth place with Steve Cox, Adam Kennedy and Mark Redman.

Zito made his postseason debut in Game 4 of the AL Division Series (ALDS) against the New York Yankees. He went 5 2/3 innings, struck out 5, walked 2, and allowed an earned run. Zito earned the win, outpitching Roger Clemens. However, the Yankees would win the series, 3–2, and would go on to win their third straight World Series.

==== 2001 ====
In 2001, Zito switched his uniform number to 75 (which he would wear throughout the rest of his career) and finished third in the American League (AL) in strikeouts per nine innings (8.61), fourth in strikeouts (205), sixth in wins (17), eighth in ERA (3.49), and tenth in winning percentage (.680). Zito became the sixth lefty aged 23 or younger since 1902 to strike out at least 200 batters in a season. After a great rookie season, Zito struggled through the early part of the 2001 season, posting a 6–7 record with a 5.01 ERA in his first 22 starts. However, he rebounded nicely and by August, he was putting up good pitching numbers. Zito was named Pitcher of the Month in August, going 5–1 with a 1.02 ERA. Zito won Pitcher of the Month again in September, going 6–0 with a 1.89 ERA. During those last two months of the season, Zito went a combined 11–1 with a 1.32 ERA, best in baseball. He finished the season with a 17-8 record and a 3.49 ERA.

The Athletics made the postseason and again played the Yankees in the ALDS. Zito pitched in Game 3 against Mike Mussina. He went eight innings, striking out six, walking one, and allowing an earned run. But Zito took the loss as the Yankees won the game, 1–0. The Yankees would end up taking the series, 3–2.

==== 2002 ====
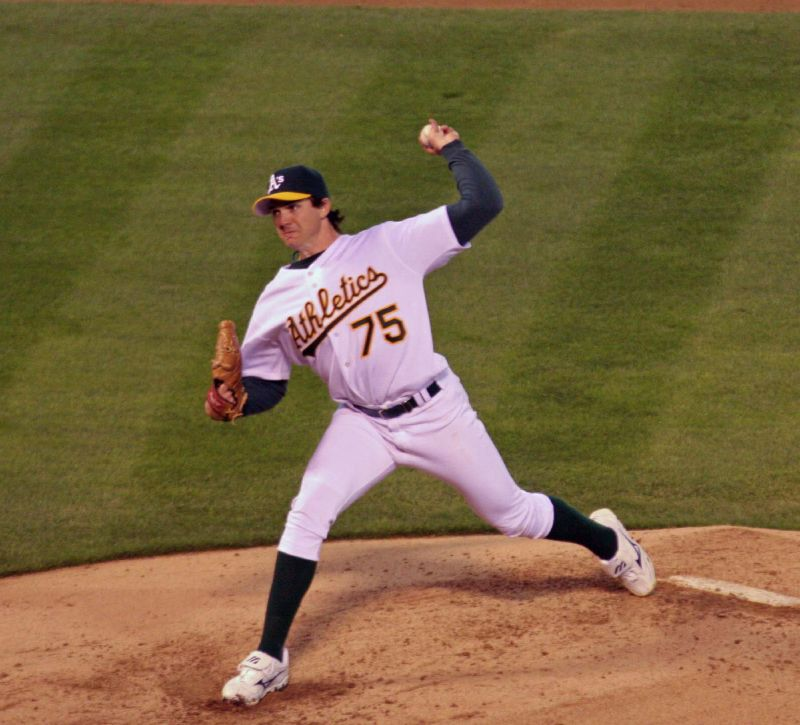
Zito pitching for the Athletics in 2002

In 2002, Zito became one of the best pitchers in baseball. On May 8, Zito signed a 4-year, $9.3 million contract extension, keeping him in Oakland through at least the 2005 season, with a club option for the 2006 season. On June 22, Zito won his 10th game of the season. It was the earliest that an A's pitcher had reached the 10-win mark since Bob Welch got there on June 15, 1990. Zito was named to the All-Star team for the first time in his career. On July 18, he went 7 1/3 innings while giving up no runs against the Angels. That win gave Zito a team-record 16th straight win at home. Zito again faced the Angels in his next start and produced similar results. He went 6 1/3 innings and gave up just one run. That win gave Zito the most wins by an AL pitcher (14). Zito would become the AL's first 15-game winner when he beat the Rangers. On August 23, Zito recorded his 18th win of the season, giving him one more than his previous career-high of 17, in a game against the Detroit Tigers.

On August 28, Zito earned his 19th win of the season against the Kansas City Royals. However, he lost his bid for a perfect game in the sixth inning when Neifi Pérez singled with one out. Zito gave credit to Pérez. "I wasn't pitching to maintain a no-hitter or something", Zito said. "I left the ball up over the middle to Pérez, and he hit it up the middle. It was a good piece of hitting."

On September 8, Zito became the first pitcher in the AL to win 20 games when he pitched seven innings and allowed no earned runs against the Minnesota Twins. "I'm not pitching for the Cy Young", Zito said. "I'm pitching to get the Oakland A's into the playoffs and to the World Series." In his next start, against the Seattle Mariners, Zito took a no-hitter into the eighth inning before John Olerud singled to leadoff the inning. Seattle manager Lou Piniella said if he could vote for the Cy Young Award winner, "It would go to that young man who pitched for the Oakland team. There are other deserving pitchers, but [Zito] has won 21 games and he competes well."

In his last start of the season, Zito went six innings and allowed just a run against the Texas Rangers. In his last 10 starts, Zito went 8–0, boosting his chances of winning the AL Cy Young Award. "Barry pitched another gem", said Oakland manager Art Howe. "He's certainly had a Cy Young-type season. He's just been steady all season long." Zito was a part of the A's 20 consecutive game winning streak in 2002.

In Game 3 of the ALDS, Zito went six innings and gave up three earned runs against the Twins, earning the win. However, the Twins defeated the Athletics in five games, making the Athletics the first team to lose the deciding game of a series three years in a row.

Zito won the AL Cy Young Award with a 23–5 record, narrowly defeating Pedro Martínez in the voting. He led the league with 23 wins, was second in winning percentage (.821), and third in both ERA (2.75) and strikeouts (182). Zito's 23 wins were the most by an AL left-hander since Frank Viola had 24 wins for Minnesota in 1988. Zito also allowed a .185 average to opposing hitters, the lowest in the AL. Martínez, who had led the AL in ERA (2.26), strikeouts (239), and winning percentage (.833), became the first pitcher since the introduction of the award to lead his league in each of the three categories and not win the award. Zito became the first A's pitcher to win the Cy Young Award since Dennis Eckersley did it in 1992. Zito was also named AL TSN Pitcher of the Year.

==== 2003 ====
In 2003, Zito became only the fifth A's pitcher--and the first since Bob Welch in 1990 to win 10 straight games On April 18, Zito went nine innings, allowing six hits and no runs in a start against the Rangers; he improved to 9–0 in his career against Texas. After the game, Texas manager Buck Showalter said, "I got the feeling he made it look pretty easy. When he has that kind of command, you can see what happens." Zito was again named to the All-Star team, the second time he has been named to the team. For the season, Zito was seventh in the AL in ERA (3.30). He had a 14–12 record and 146 strikeouts over a career-high 231 2/3 innings pitched.

In Game 2 of the ALDS against the Red Sox, Zito went seven innings, striking out nine, walking two, allowing one earned run, and earning the win in Oakland's 5–1 triumph. In Game 5, Zito went six innings and allowed four earned runs, taking the loss as the Red Sox won the game and the series.

==== 2004 ====
Zito went 2–3 with a 6.83 ERA in April 2004. He threw eight shutout innings of four-hit ball in a 5–0 victory over the Devil Rays on August 21. Oakland manager Ken Macha would have let him throw a complete game, but Zito said, "I was worrying about being fresh for the next game. I didn't want to end up [throwing] 115–120 [pitches], so I took advantage of the situation and shut it down." For the season, he went 11–11 with a 4.48 ERA; this was Zito's only year with the Athletics in which he posted an ERA higher than 4.00. He finished 10th in the league in strikeouts with 163.

==== 2005 ====
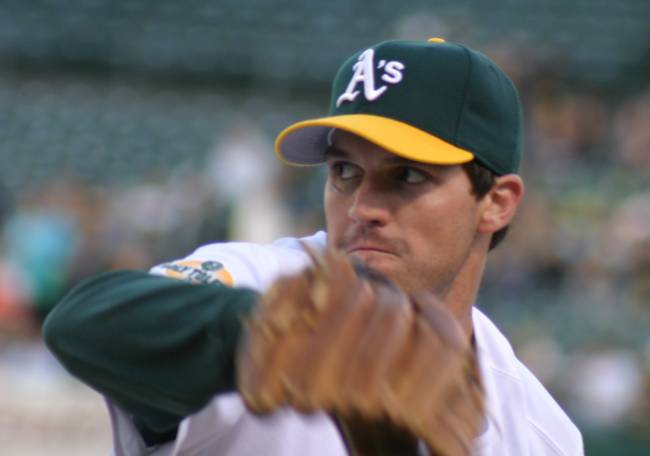
Zito throwing a pitch

Following the departure of Tim Hudson and Mark Mulder, Zito was given his first Opening Day assignment in 2005. He allowed four runs over six innings in a 4–0 loss to the Orioles on April 4. In 2005, Zito again struggled in April, going 0–4 with a 6.60 ERA. In his first 16 starts of the campaign, he was 3–8 with a 4.41 ERA. However, Zito pitched better the rest of the season. He had a streak of 14 consecutive starts from May 17 through July 25 (and 20 out of 21 through August 30) in which he gave up fewer hits than innings pitched. From June 28 through August 4, he earned the win in eight consecutive starts. On June 6, Zito allowed two runs in six innings in a 2–1 loss to the Washington Nationals. During the game, he collected his first major league hit, against Tony Armas Jr. Zito was named Pitcher of the Month in July, going 6–0 with a 2.51 ERA. In 35 starts, Zito went 14–13 with a 3.86 ERA. Zito's 35 starts were the most in Major League Baseball that season, demonstrating his durability as a pitcher. He also had 171 strikeouts, good for fifth in the league.

==== 2006 ====
In 2006, Zito went 1 1/3 innings and allowed seven earned runs on Opening Day (April 3) against the Yankees. It was the shortest outing of his career. However, Zito quickly rebounded from that bad start. On June 1, he allowed four hits over seven innings in a 4–0 victory over the Twins. During the game, he recorded his 1,000th career strikeout by punching out Lew Ford. On July 2, Zito and Brandon Webb both allowed one run through eight innings before Zito gave up two unearned runs while only getting two outs in the ninth; Webb threw a complete game as the Arizona Diamondbacks beat the Athletics 3–1. When the All-Star Break rolled around, Zito was 8–6 with a 3.29 earned run average. He was named to the 2006 All-Star Game. On August 25, Zito earned his 100th career win when he defeated the Rangers 9–3. He had a no-hitter going into the eighth inning, but Mark DeRosa singled to lead it off. In 35 starts (first in the league again), he had a 16–10 record, a 3.83 ERA, and 151 strikeouts. Zito was tied for eighth in the league in wins, he ranked tenth in ERA, and he was third in innings pitched (221). He had the eighth-lowest run support of AL pitchers (4.97) but had a 15–1 record if he received at least two runs of support.

Zito helped the Athletics reach the postseason. In Game 1 of the ALDS, he allowed one run and four hits over eight innings, outdueling Johan Santana and earning the win in a 3–2 victory over the Twins and setting the stage for an Oakland sweep. Zito did not fare as well in Game 1 of the AL Championship Series (ALCS) against the Tigers, allowing five runs over 3 2/3 innings in a 5–1 defeat. The Tigers went on to sweep the Athletics in four games.

Zito replaced his agent Arn Tellem with Scott Boras in July 2006. Zito was a focal point of the 2006 trade deadline, and was widely rumored to be headed to the Mets in a potential deal for prospect Lastings Milledge. Susan Slusser of the San Francisco Chronicle wrote that if the Mets were unwilling to trade Milledge, the Athletics might be interested in Aaron Heilman and John Maine. However, Athletics' general manager Billy Beane decided to keep Zito for the rest of the season.

=== San Francisco Giants (2007–2013) ===
Following his seventh season with the Athletics, Zito signed a seven-year deal with the San Francisco Giants worth $126 million, plus an $18 million option for 2014 with a $7 million buyout. Zito's contract was the highest for any pitcher in Major League history at the time.

Zito underperformed with the Giants and failed to meet the expectations generated by his huge contract. In 2026, ESPN described his Giants contract as one of the worst free agent signings in MLB history.

==== 2007 ====
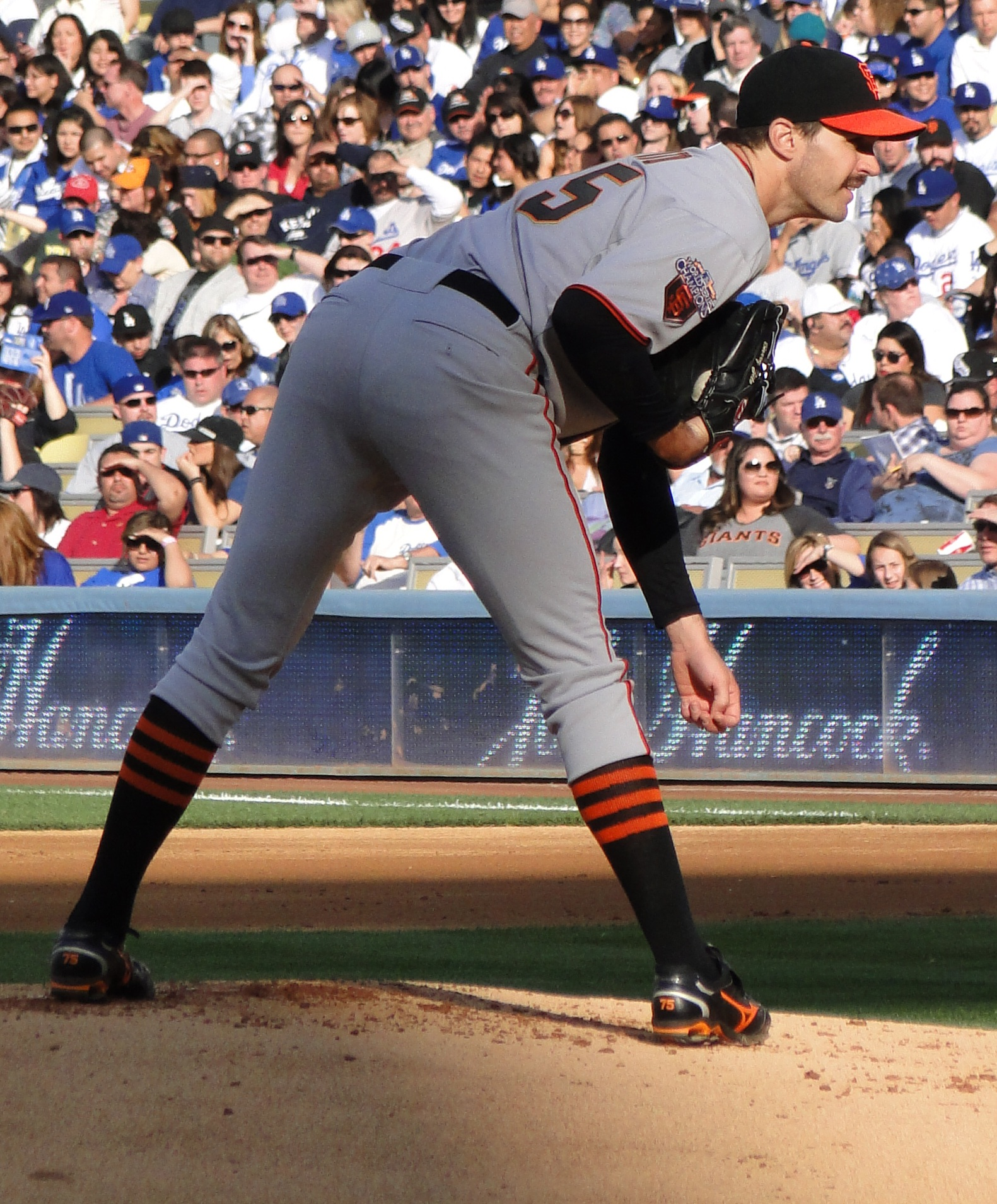
Zito with the Giants

During spring training in 2007, Zito and Barry Bonds made shirts that read "Don't ask me, ask Barry" with an arrow pointing to the other Barry. By all accounts, Zito and Bonds got along well during their short time as teammates, and Zito made a point of saying he would stand by Bonds through onslaughts from the media.

In his first start as a member of the Giants, Opening Day (April 3), Zito went five innings and allowed two earned runs against the San Diego Padres. He would take the loss. In his next start, Zito struggled. He went six innings but allowed eight earned runs against the Los Angeles Dodgers. Zito would earn his first win as a member of the Giants in his next start on April 16 when he went six innings, gave up three hits, and allowed no runs to the Colorado Rockies. "I've been trying to have a good game", Zito said. "You can't try to do anything. You either do or you don't. I tried to get too fine with my pitches. I wasn't aggressive."

On May 18, Zito made his return to Oakland as a Giant. He lasted only four innings and gave up seven runs while walking seven, including two bases-loaded walks. The A's beat the Giants, 15–3. He faced his old team again on June 9, this time in San Francisco. Zito pitched four innings while giving up three earned runs on nine hits in a 6–0 defeat.

Zito made his first Major League relief appearance on August 5 against the Padres due to an early exit by starter Noah Lowry and an overworked bullpen. He pitched a scoreless seventh inning. He recorded his first career run batted in (RBI) two days later against the Nationals' Mike Bacsik, in the same game that Barry Bonds hit his record-breaking 756th career home run.

After Zito's start on August 12, his ERA was 5.13. Over his final nine starts, he posted the fifth-best ERA in the NL, at 3.10. He also had a 3–2 record. He admitted that he had put pressure on himself to perform because of the large contract and was learning that he just needed to be himself. Zito also said that it had been difficult for him to adjust to a new league, team, and ballpark. On the final day of the season, in Los Angeles against the Dodgers, Zito allowed two runs on five hits and had four strikeouts in an 11–2 win. For the first time in his career, Zito had a losing record, as he finished the season at 11–13. He failed to reach 200 innings (196 2/3) for the first time since 2000 and posted a career-high 4.53 ERA.

==== 2008 ====
Zito began the 2008 season as the oldest starter and the veteran presence in the Giants' starting rotation. In April, Zito went 0–6 with a 7.53 ERA and 11 strikeouts. He was the third pitcher in the last 52 years to go 0–6 before May 1. On April 28, the Giants moved him to the bullpen. Zito did not make an appearance out of the bullpen and returned to the rotation on May 7 against the Pittsburgh Pirates. In that game, Zito allowed five hits and two earned runs over five innings and took the loss, his seventh of the season. On May 23, Zito collected his first win of the 2008 season against the Florida Marlins. On June 13, Zito became the first pitcher to record 10 losses in the Major Leagues following a 5–1 loss to Oakland. His 5.1 walks per nine innings pitched for the season, 51.5% first-pitch-strike percentage, and 14 sacrifice flies allowed, were all the worst in the majors. Beginning June 25, Zito saw some improvement, as he posted an 8–6 record for the rest of the season to go along with a 4.33 ERA. He finished the year 10–17 with a career-high 5.15 ERA and 120 strikeouts. His 17 losses led the National League and were the second-worst total in San Francisco history (Ray Sadecki lost 18 games in 1968).

==== 2009 ====
The 2009 season seemed to mark a rebound in Zito's pitching performance. Though starting the season 0–2 with an ERA of 10, Zito ended the season with an ERA of 4.03. His ERA would have been 3.74 had it not been for his first two starts. Though going only 10–13 in the season, Zito's record was much more the fault of his spotty run support (the second-lowest in the major leagues) than his performance on the mound. On June 21, Zito pitched a no-hitter through six innings against Texas before giving up a home run to Andruw Jones in the seventh inning. He won the game, his fourth win of the season. On July 7, Zito pitched what could be considered his best game of the season. He pitched 8 2/3 innings against the Florida Marlins, allowing one run on four hits, striking out six, and walking one. He won the game, his fifth win of the season.

==== 2010 ====
Zito started the 2010 season by pitching six shutout innings against the Houston Astros to earn a win; it was the first time he had won his season-opening start since 2003. On April 24, Zito stifled the St. Louis Cardinals, throwing eight shutout innings with ten strikeouts for his third victory of the season, en route to starting the season 5–0 for the first time in his career. It was the best start by a Giants' pitcher since 2004 when Lowry started 6–0. On June 12, 2010, Zito earned his first win against his former team, the Athletics, which gave him victories against every MLB team. Zito is one of eighteen pitchers to record a win against all 30 MLB teams, and the first pitcher to accomplish the feat while only with two clubs.

Through June 12, Zito was 7–2 with a 3.10 ERA. After a strong start to the season, Zito regressed down the stretch, going 2–12 with a 4.97 ERA the rest of the way. He finished the season 9–14 with a 4.15 ERA, snapping a streak of nine straight seasons in which he had 10 or more wins. In a rotation featuring Tim Lincecum, Matt Cain, Jonathan Sánchez, and Madison Bumgarner, Zito was the odd man out for the playoffs. He was left completely off the Giants' 25-man active roster for the postseason. Zito worked out throughout the playoffs so that he would be ready to join the roster in case of an injury, but he was never needed and remained on the secondary squad. The Giants won the 2010 World Series in five games over Texas, and he received his first World Series ring.

==== 2011 ====
Early in the 2011 season, Zito experienced his first trip to the disabled list after an injury to his right foot during a fielding play. His replacement, Ryan Vogelsong, excelled, but Zito was able to rejoin the rotation when he returned in June because Sánchez was placed on the disabled list with left biceps tendinitis. Zito pitched well in his first few starts back, pitching well against the Tigers, Chicago Cubs, and Padres en route to three Giants wins, but later resumed his struggle, going 0–3 with a 10.91 ERA over his next three starts. He returned to the disabled list after aggravating his right foot injury; ironically, his trip to the DL made room for Sánchez to return to the rotation. On August 13, Zito injured his right ankle on another fielding play in a Triple-A rehab start, sidelining him for another month. Zito returned from the DL on September 11 but was used out of the bullpen for the rest of the year; he posted a 9.00 ERA over his final four games. In a career-low 13 games (nine starts), he had a 3–4 record, a career-high 5.87 ERA, 32 strikeouts, and 24 walks in a career-low 53 2/3 innings.

==== 2012 ====
After struggling mightily during spring training in which he threw with a new crouched delivery, Zito began the 2012 season with a start against the Rockies on April 9. He threw arguably one of the best games of his career, throwing a complete-game shutout while giving up just 4 hits in the 7–0 Giants victory. It was his first shutout since 2003 when he was a member of the Oakland Athletics. In a June 3 home game matchup with the Cubs, Zito pitched four-hit shutout ball into the ninth inning for a 2–0 Giants win and brought his season ERA below 3.00. In earning the win, Zito earned his 150th career win, becoming the 246th pitcher to hit the mark. Zito had a hand in the Giants' second road shutout win of the season when he pitched seven innings, allowing three hits and recording four strikeouts, in a July 17 game versus the Atlanta Braves. The win pushed his season record to 8–6. Zito would go on to finish the season with a 15–8 record, his most wins in a season with the Giants, while sporting a 4.15 ERA.

Zito faced off against the Reds in Game 4 of the National League Division Series (NLDS) on October 10 and struggled, being pulled in the third inning after allowing two runs. However, the Giants went on to win 8–3. The Giants, after losing the first two games of the series, became the first team to rally from a 2–0 deficit with both losses at home in an NLDS, winning 3 straight road games to win the series in five games. On October 19, 2012, Zito rebounded and pitched arguably the best game of his career, tossing 7 2/3 shutout innings against the St. Louis Cardinals in Game 5 of the National League Championship Series (NLCS), earning the win. It was his first postseason win since 2006 and according to Zito himself, was the biggest win of his career. That same day, Zito inspired the Twitter hashtag #rallyzito, which, behind the efforts of Giants fans, was trending worldwide on the social networking site. The Giants, after trailing 3–1 in the series, prevailed in seven games.

On October 24, 2012, Zito pitched in the first World Series of his career. As the Game 1 starter, Zito earned the win, outpitching Detroit's Justin Verlander by tossing 5 2/3 innings of one-run ball. Zito added an RBI single en route to an 8–3 Giants win. The Giants went on to sweep the Tigers in the World Series, and Zito went 2–0 with a 1.69 earned run average in the postseason. Zito did not lose a single game after August 2 against the Mets, and San Francisco won his last 14 starts.

==== 2013 ====
On April 5, 2013, during the Giants' home opener, Zito held the Cardinals scoreless over seven shutout innings, earning the 1–0 win. He followed this performance with seven more shutout innings and some personal offensive contribution at the plate against the Rockies in a 10–0 win to complete a 3-game series sweep. It was the Giants' 16th straight victory in a row in games started by Zito (including the 2012 regular season and postseason), the longest such streak by a Giants pitcher since 1936 by Hall of Fame left-handed pitcher Carl Hubbell. However, Zito struggled for the rest of the season, going 2–10 with a 6.24 ERA after April 21 and losing his rotation spot a couple times late in the year.

On September 25, manager Bruce Bochy decided to give Zito one final start with the Giants as a tribute to his tenure with the team. Zito responded by allowing two runs (one earned) over five innings and earning the win in a 7–4 victory over the Dodgers. However, because Zito was removed between innings during the Dodger game, Bochy sent him in to pitch in relief in the final game of the year so that Giants' fans could give him a standing ovation. Zito entered with two outs in the eighth inning on September 29 and struck out Mark Kotsay (playing his final game) as the Giants beat the Padres 7–6. He finished the 2013 season at 5–11 with a 5.74 ERA in 30 games, 25 of which were starts. Following the season, Zito took out a full-page ad in the San Francisco Chronicle thanking Giants fans for their support. The Giants declined Zito's 2014 option, buying it out for $7 million.

=== Oakland Athletics (2015) ===
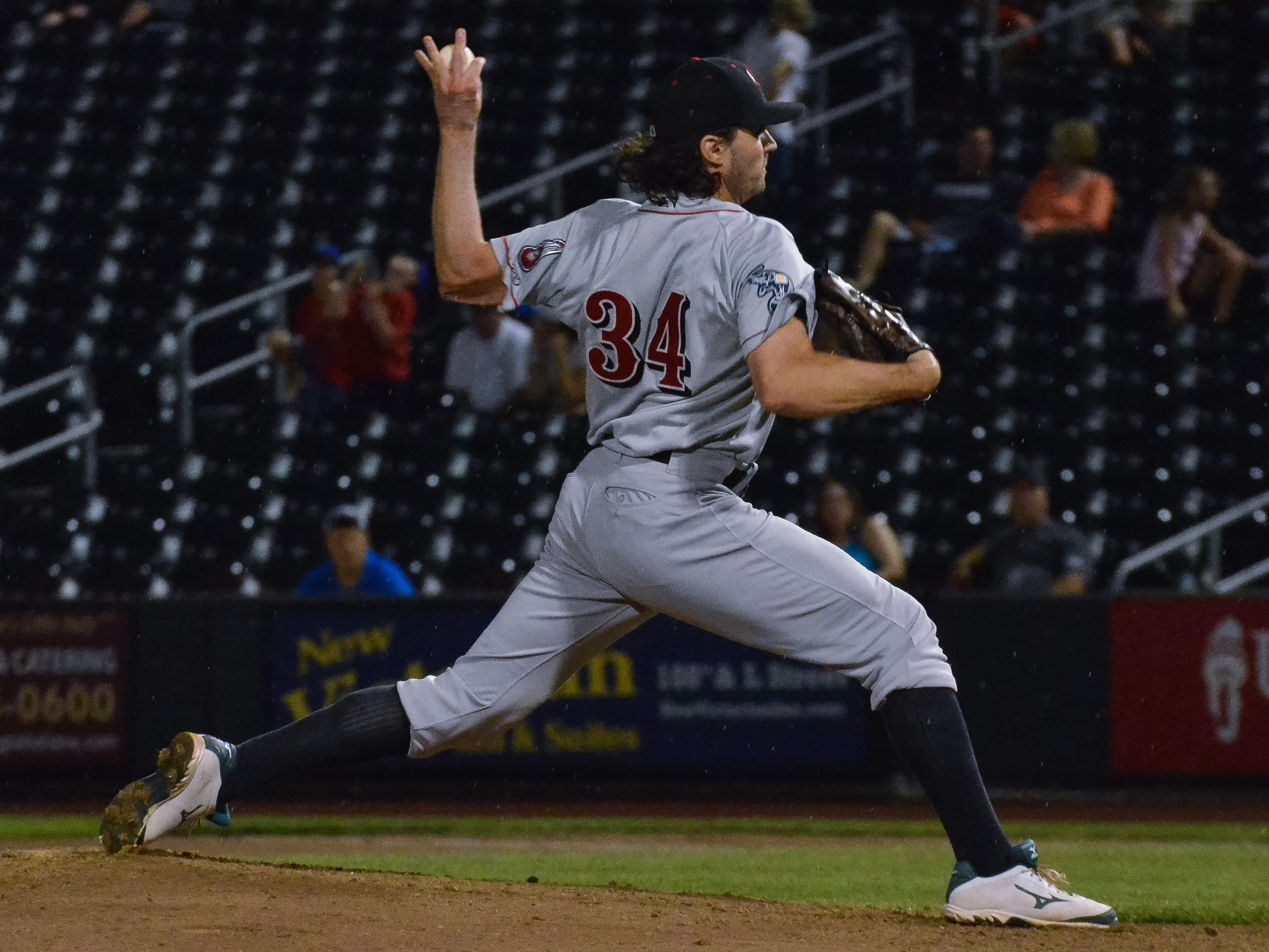
Zito in his final 2015 appearance with the Triple-A Nashville Sounds on September 6

After taking a year off from baseball, Zito signed a minor league contract to return to the Athletics on February 16, 2015. In spring training, Zito competed for a role on the Athletics' 25-man roster, possibly as a long reliever. On April 4, 2015, Zito accepted an assignment to the Triple-A Nashville Sounds. Zito's Nashville teammates lauded him for embracing the Triple-A lifestyle and for his commitment to the team: charting pitches between starts, coaching first base, and even buying dinner for the entire team on his birthday. Zito spent the entire season with Nashville, including about a month on the disabled list with left shoulder tendinitis. He was activated on the next-to-last day of the season on which he pitched one scoreless inning of relief. In 24 appearances (22 starts), he accrued an 8–7 record with a 3.46 ERA and 91 strikeouts in Nashville.

Zito revealed in an interview that he had learned the Athletics would not be bringing him up to the major league club in September. However, following a season-ending injury to Jesse Chavez, Oakland purchased Zito's contract from Triple-A on September 16 and placed him on the major league roster. He made a total of three MLB appearances with the Athletics. Zito made his first major league appearance of the season on September 20, pitching an inning in relief. On September 26, 2015, Zito started for the Athletics against Tim Hudson and the Giants in a matchup that was arranged as a tribute to the A's "Big Three" of the early 2000s. Both pitchers received lengthy standing ovations from the sold-out Coliseum crowd (which included the third Big Three member, Mulder) upon leaving the game.

On October 19, 2015, Zito announced his retirement from baseball in an article for The Players' Tribune.

== Pitching style ==
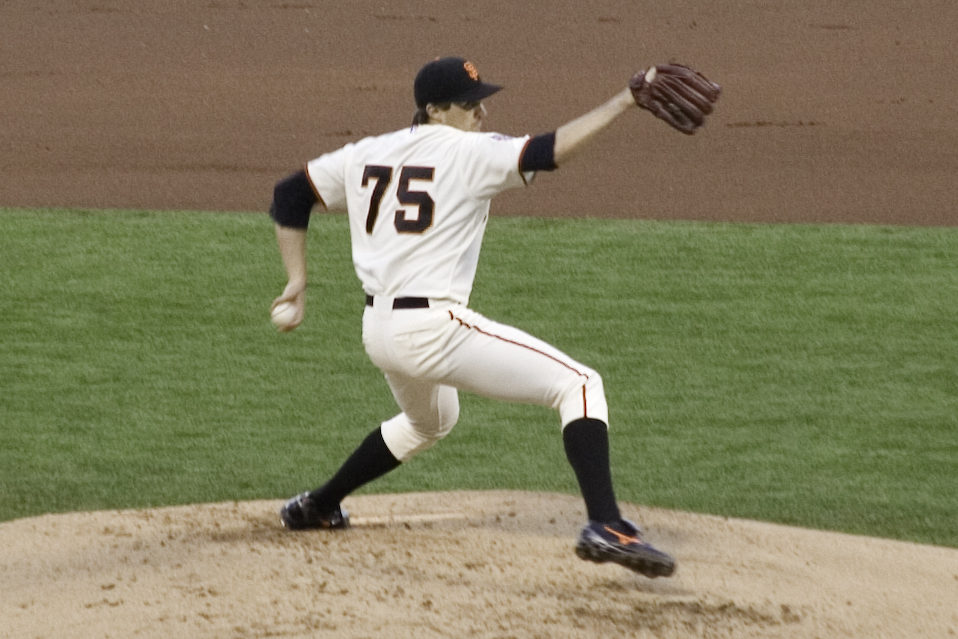
Zito's windup

Zito's fastball hovered between 84 miles per hour (135 km/h) and 88 miles per hour (142 km/h), although earlier in his career as an Oakland A, Zito was capable of throwing his four-seamer regularly between 88 miles per hour (142 km/h) and 92 miles per hour (148 km/h). He augmented it with a circle changeup and a curveball that he used as a strikeout pitch. Zito is known for his curveball. His curveball was voted the best in the Major Leagues in a player poll conducted by Sports Illustrated in 2005. Alex Rodriguez once stated that he had never seen anything like Zito's curveball, commenting: "It's such a high one, and it drops three to four feet. You might as well not even look for it because you're not going to hit it."

In mid-2004, Zito added a two-seam fastball and a cutter–slider hybrid to his arsenal. In the 2009 season, this cutter-slider became a prominent part of his repertoire, being used more frequently than his changeup. Zito's diminished velocity at the start of the 2007 season (his fastball velocity slowed to 83–85 miles per hour (134–137 km/h)) and loss of command were the key mechanical reasons for his struggles that year, as he more often got behind in the count and had to rely more on his fastball. During the 2009 season, Zito made changes to his delivery, lowering his arm slot from an over the top angle to a three-quarters delivery. This change helped his fastball velocity go back up to the 86–89 miles per hour (138–143 km/h) range as well as sharpening the break of his curveball. However, in 2011, he was once again in the 84–87 miles per hour (135–140 km/h) range with his fastball. In 2012, Zito relied mostly on his two-seam fastball and cutter and reduced his reliance on the four-seamer, which was the slowest four-seamer in MLB among starting pitchers that year, at 84.6 miles per hour (136.2 km/h).

Addressing his finesse pitching style, Zito said, "My fastball is set up by my offspeed, that's no secret. So if I can command my fastball to both sides of the plate and throw most of my offspeed for strikes, I'll get them to miss the barrel. That's what I'm going for."

== Legacy ==
From 2000 through 2004 with the Athletics, Zito, Hudson, and Mulder were known as the "Big Three." Of the three, Zito had the highest single-season win total and was the only one to win the Cy Young Award. Zito's .618 winning percentage is 10th all-time in Athletics history. His 6.896 strikeouts per 9 innings pitched ranks seventh, his 1,096 strikeouts rank eighth, and his 222 games started rank 10th. Zito also holds a couple more dubious positions on Oakland's list: his 148 home runs allowed rank fifth, and his 65 hit by pitches rank fourth (although he trails Eddie Plank, Chief Bender, and Rube Waddell in that category). Zito's .821 winning percentage in 2002 is tied with Bender's in 1910 for 10th among Athletics' single-season totals. His 8.608 strikeouts per 9 innings pitched in 2001 rank seventh, and his 205 strikeouts in 2001 are tied for 10th (with Dave Stewart's 1987 total and Todd Stottlemyre's 1995 total).

Zito is known for having underperformed with the Giants and for having failed to meet the expectations generated by his record-setting contract with the team. With the Giants, Zito pitched to a regular-season record of 63–80 with a 4.62 ERA. However, in the 2012 postseason, he saved the Giants' season by pitching them to a Game 5 victory in the NLCS against the Cardinals and then outdueling Tigers' ace Justin Verlander in Game 1 of the 2012 World Series. The Giants went on to win their second World Series in three years.

== Awards ==
- 1999 – Pac-10 Pitcher of the Year
- 1999 – First-Team College All-American
- 1999 – Pac-10 Conference All-Star
- 2000 – Triple-A All-Star
- 2002 – Baseball America First-Team Major League All-Star
- 2002 – Cy Young Award (AL)
- 2002 – Sporting News AL Pitcher of the Year
- 2002 – All-Star (AL)
- 2003 – All-Star (AL)
- 2006 – All-Star (AL)
- 2012 – ML Hutch Award
- 2012 – ML Lou Gehrig Memorial Award

== Music career ==
Zito started playing guitar in 1999 to pass the time on road trips. He had not considered music as a profession until his sister, Sally Zito, asked him to play guitar in her band which he played with during the offseason from 2000 to 2007. He began writing songs in preparation for a career after baseball. His 2015 comeback bid found him playing the majority of the season in Nashville, Tennessee, the home of country music. He used his time off to learn from the city's music industry professionals and to pursue songwriting. Zito released his first EP, titled No Secrets, on January 27, 2017. The collection contains six songs either written or co-written by Zito. He later co-wrote and sang vocals for a theme song for the Nashville Sounds, titled "That Sound".

In 2020, Zito competed in season three of The Masked Singer as "Rhino".

On September 26, 2024, Zito sang The Star Spangled Banner before the start of the Oakland Athletics final home game.

== Personal life ==
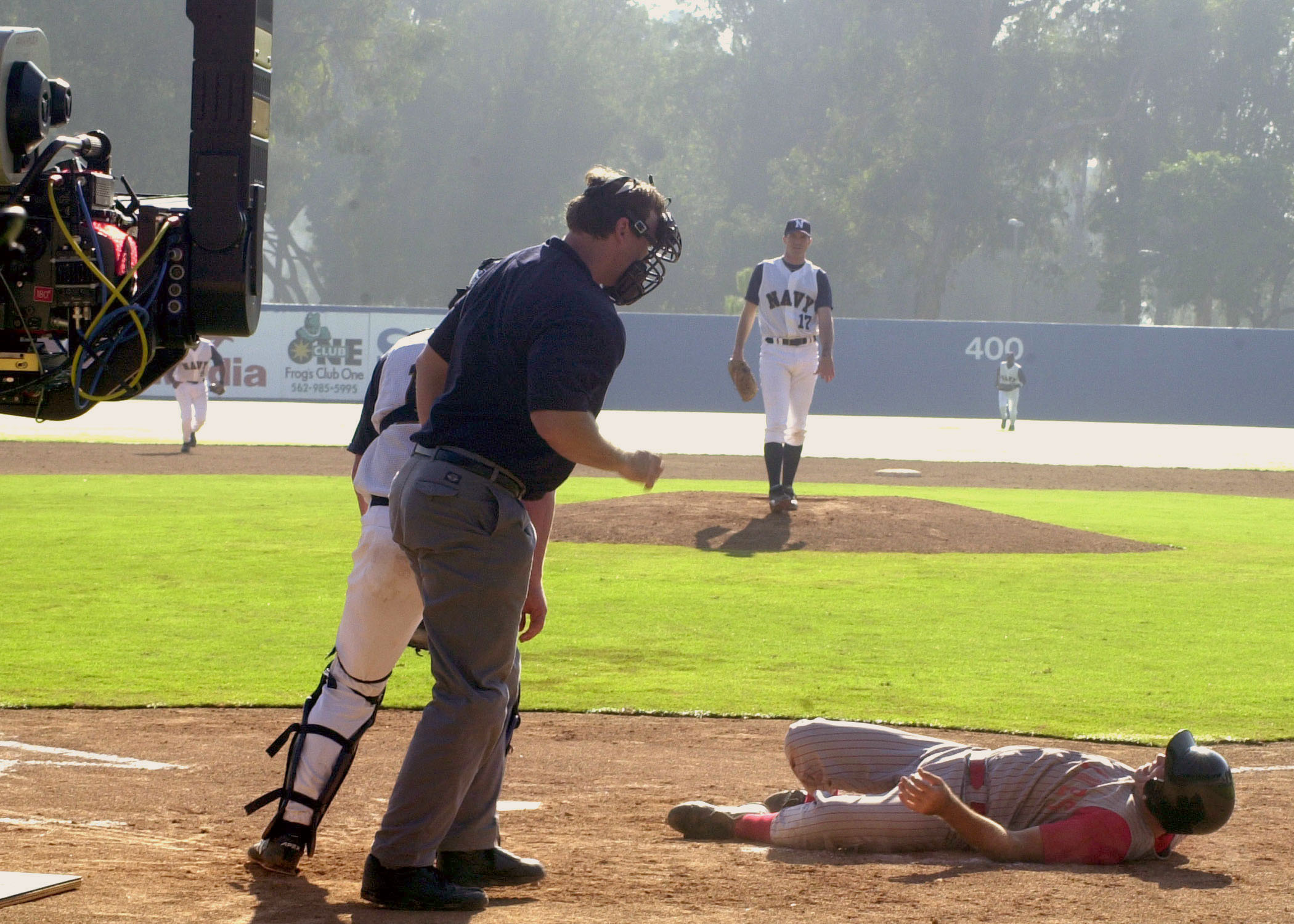
Zito in JAG

Zito became engaged to former Miss Missouri Teen USA and former Miss Missouri USA Amber Seyer in April 2011, and they were married on December 3, 2011. His father, Joe Zito, who died June 19, 2013, at the age of 84, composed and arranged music for Nat King Cole in the early 1960s (ca.1961–64) and arranged for the Buffalo Symphony Orchestra. Zito's mother Roberta was a musician who sang in a choral group known as The Merry Young Souls and with Nat King Cole and his band. Zito is also a musician. He plays guitar, and he co-wrote the song "Butterflies" that was used in the Eddie Murphy film A Thousand Words. Zito's maternal aunt was married to television actor Patrick Duffy.

Zito and wife Amber gave birth to their first child, a son named Mars, in July 2014. They adopted their second child, a son named Mercer Joseph Zito, in May 2017. A third child, a son named Rome, was born in February 2020. A fourth son, Rockwell, was born in September 2024.

Zito is known for his idiosyncrasies and his offbeat personality. Early in his career, Zito dyed his hair blue. He earned the nicknames "Planet Zito" and "Captain Quirk" when with Oakland. Zito says he likes the way his uniform number 75 looks because the 7 and the 5 are like a "shelf" to hold the name "Zito" up. He surfs and practices yoga. He has done yoga poses in the outfield, and meditated before games. Zito practices Transcendental Meditation and supports the David Lynch Foundation. Zito has said, however, that he believes terms such as "flaky" or "hippie" have been applied to him by people who do not know him well enough to know better.

Zito was raised in a "spiritual, metaphysical type church" that was founded by his grandmother and that his mother, Roberta, who died in 2008, formerly preached at. In 2001, Zito espoused a universal life force that he credited with his midseason turnaround. He said that he discovered this force by reading Creative Mind by Ernest Holmes.

However, in August 2011, Zito became a Christian, saying he "committed to Jesus Christ as his Lord and Savior." Zito explained that God got his attention through his being left off the 2010 Giants postseason roster and a car accident and freak foot injury in early 2011. He got a tattoo (his only one) of a golden calf on the inside of his right bicep as a reminder for him to "not worship false idols" and to remember that God comes first. Zito said that his wife is a Christian as well. In 2019, Zito wrote Curveball: How I Discovered True Fulfillment After Chasing Fortune and Fame, a memoir book about his life and his conversion to Christianity. Zito has said, “Having placed my full identity into my baseball career for most of my life, only to have it stripped away during the 2010 World Series run is what led me to discover my true identity. Not in a game, but in Jesus Christ.”

In 2003, Zito portrayed a United States Navy petty officer in an episode of JAG on CBS. Zito's character, a pitcher, faced assault charges after hitting a Marine with a ball during the annual Navy-Marine all-star baseball game.

== Activism ==
=== Philanthropy ===
Zito founded the charity Strikeouts For Troops. The charity provides the comforts of home and works to lift the spirits and morale of injured US troops and offers support to military families. In 2010, Zito announced that he would donate $1,500 for every strikeout in the Giants–Padres game on September 11. There were a total of 14 strikeouts in the game.

== Publications ==
- Zito, Barry; Noland, Robert (2019). Curveball: How I Discovered True Fulfillment After Chasing Fortune and Fame. Thomas Nelson. ISBN 9780785227663.

== See also ==
- List of Major League Baseball annual wins leaders
- 2021 Baseball Hall of Fame balloting

Awards and achievements
Preceded by Mark Mulder; Mark Buehrle	American League Pitcher of the Month; August 2001–September 2001; July 2005	Succeeded by Derek Lowe; Bartolo Colón
Preceded by Tim Hudson	Oakland Athletics Opening Day starting pitcher 2005–2006	Succeeded by Dan Haren
Preceded by Jason Schmidt	San Francisco Giants Opening Day starting pitcher 2007–2008	Succeeded by Tim Lincecum
