= Big Three (Oakland Athletics) =

Trio of baseball pitchers

"The Big Three"

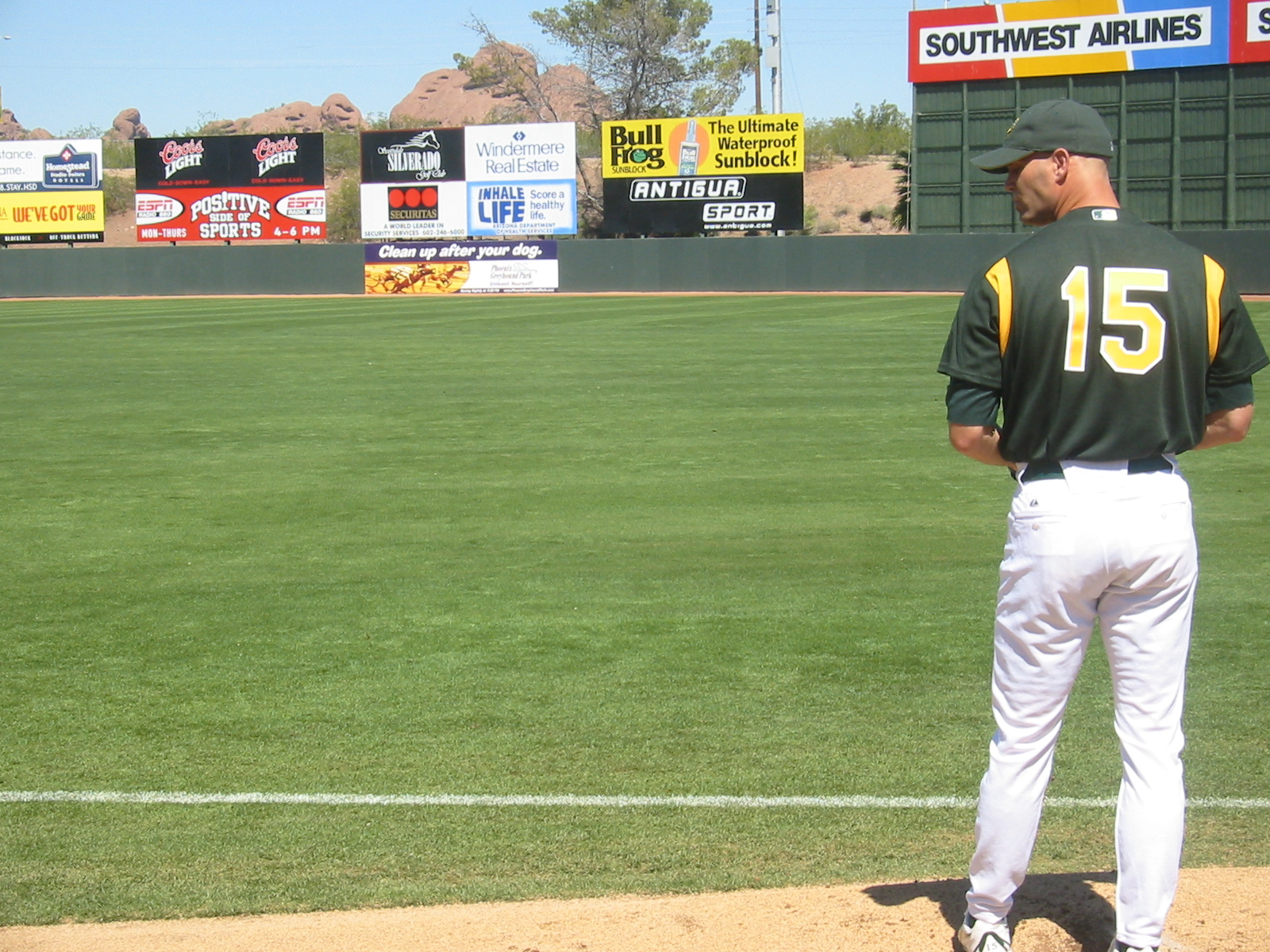
Tim Hudson

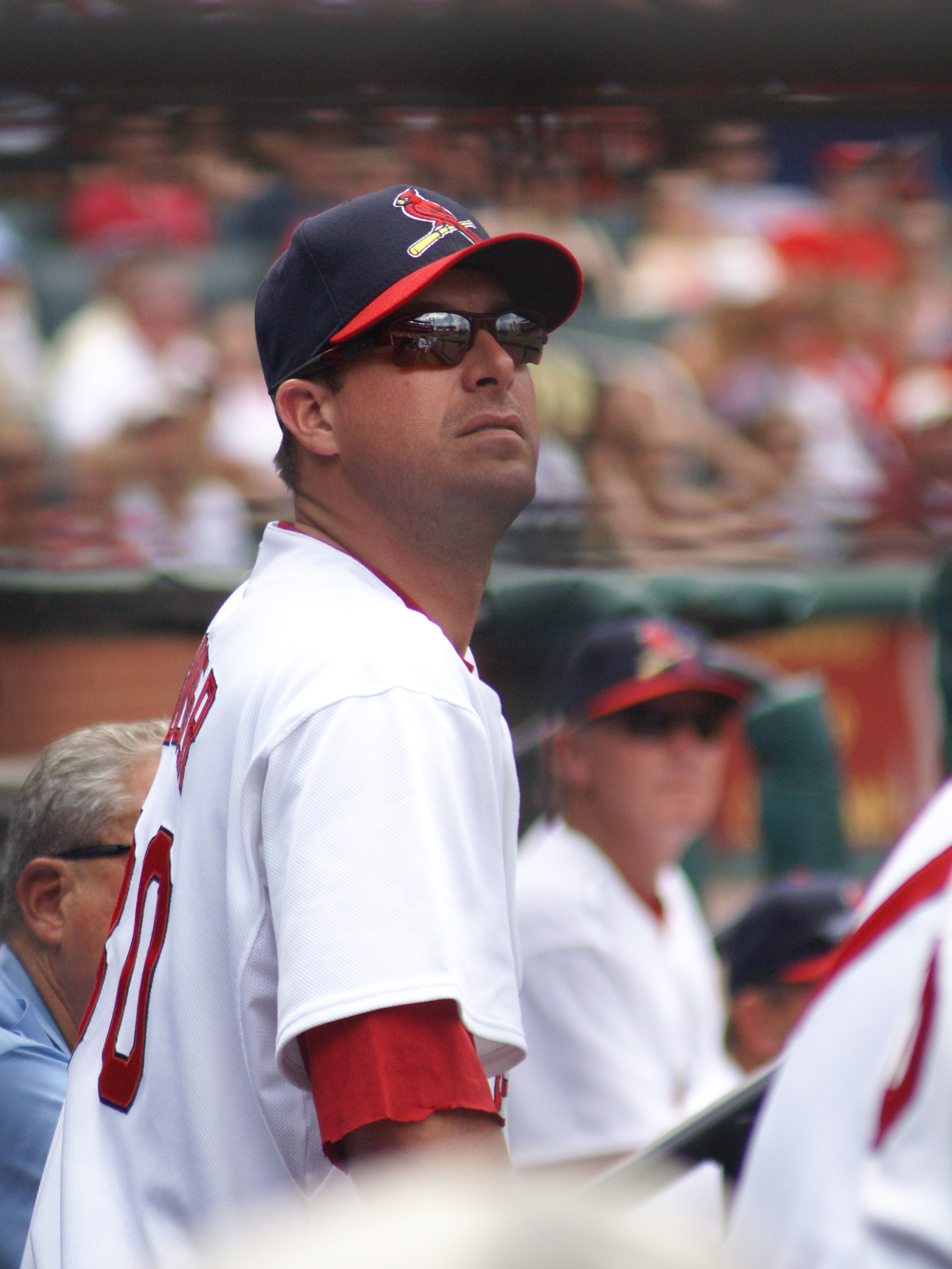
Mark Mulder

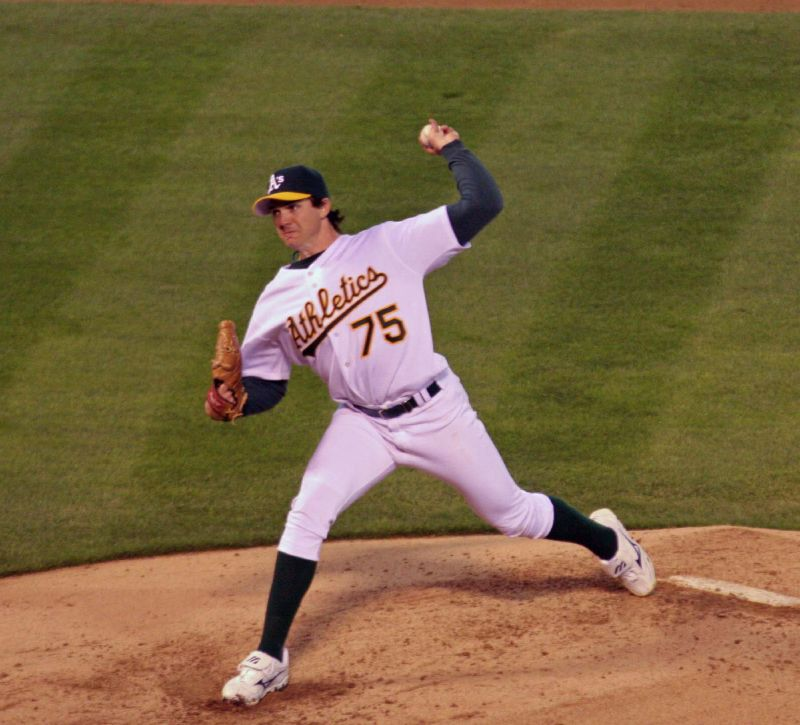
Barry Zito

The Big Three were a trio of Major League Baseball starting pitchers for the Oakland Athletics from 2000 to 2004. The Big Three consisted of Tim Hudson, Mark Mulder, and Barry Zito. Each pitcher in the Big Three was drafted by the A's and played their first few seasons together with the A's before splitting up. The Big Three helped the A's win three American League West Division titles during their five seasons together.

== Formation ==
Tim Hudson was drafted by the A's twice, first in the 35th round of the 1994 MLB draft and then in the sixth round of the 1997 MLB draft. Mark Mulder was selected by the A's with the second overall pick in the 1998 MLB draft. Barry Zito was drafted by the Seattle Mariners in the 59th round of the 1996 MLB draft and then again by the Texas Rangers in the 3rd round of the 1998 MLB Draft, but he did not sign with either team. Zito would sign with the A's after they drafted him with the ninth overall pick of the 1999 MLB draft.

Hudson made his MLB debut on June 8, 1999, in which he allowed three runs in five innings as the A's lost to the San Diego Padres 5–3. He recorded his first career win in his next start, which occurred on June 13, 1999, against the Los Angeles Dodgers. He finished with an 11–2 record in his rookie season and finished fifth in voting for the 1999 AL Rookie of the Year Award.

Mulder made his MLB debut on April 18, 2000, at 22 years of age and having played fewer than two years in the minors. Mulder had a rough rookie season, as he finished 9–10 with a 5.44 ERA.

Zito made his MLB debut on July 22, 2000, in which he allowed just one run in five innings in a victory over the Anaheim Angels, thus marking the beginning of the "Big Three" era. Zito had a successful rookie season as he finished with a 7–4 record and a 2.72 ERA in 14 starts and, like Hudson, finished fifth in voting for the 2000 AL Rookie of the Year Award.

== "Big Three" era ==
Led by an American League-high 20 wins from Tim Hudson, the Big Three led the A's to an American League West Division title in their first season together. The A's ended up splitting the first two games of the 2000 ALDS with the New York Yankees, followed by Hudson making his postseason debut in Game 3 of the ALDS. Hudson pitched a full eight innings in his postseason debut and allowed four runs as the A's fell to the Yankees 4–2. Zito made his postseason debut in Game 4 of the ALDS and allowed only one run in 5.2 innings leading the A's to an 11–1 win and forcing a deciding Game 5 back in Oakland. The A's lost Game 5 7-5 and were eliminated from the postseason.

The next season, Mark Mulder had an AL-leading 21 wins to lead the Big Three and the A's into the postseason as a wild card. He made his postseason debut in Game 1 of the ALDS against the Yankees, in which he had a strong postseason debut as he allowed only one run in 6.2 innings which led the A's to a 5–3 win over the Yankees. Hudson took the mound for Game 2 and pitched eight scoreless innings to lead the A's to a 2–0 win and to put the A's ahead 2-0 heading home while earning Hudson his first career postseason win. Zito took the mound in Game 3 and attempted to finish off a sweep against the Yankees. He gave up only one run in eight innings in his attempt to do so. However, the A's lost the game 1–0. The A's would lose Game 4 9–2, forcing a Game 5 to decide the series. Mulder took the mound for Game 5 to attempt to advance the A's to the ALCS, but his attempt did not go very well as he allowed four runs in 4.1 innings and the A's lost 5-3 eliminating them from postseason contention in favor of the Yankees for the second consecutive year.

Zito led the Big Three and the A's the following year with an AL-leading 23 wins, 2.75 ERA, and 182 strikeouts, as well as winning the 2002 AL Cy Young Award and leading the A's to an AL West Division title. Hudson took the mound for Game 1 of the 2002 ALDS against the Minnesota Twins. Despite the A's jumping out to a 5–1 lead after two innings, he gave up three more runs in the next 3.1 innings and was pulled out after 5.1 innings. The A's would end up losing the game 7–5. Mulder took the mound for Game 2 and had a strong outing, only giving up one run in six innings to lead the A's to a 9–1 win. Zito took the mound for Game 3 and went six innings, giving up three runs to lead the A's to a 6–3 win over the Twins. Hudson took the mound again in Game 4, in which he gave up seven runs in 3.1 innings en route to the A's being defeated 11-2 by the Twins. Mulder took the mound again for the A's in the fifth and deciding game of the ALDS and attempted to send the A's to the ALCS. This time, he gave up just two runs in seven innings, but the A's lost the Game 5-4 and were eliminated in the ALDS for the third consecutive year.

The Big Three were able to lift the A's to an AL West Division title in 2003, earning them their fourth consecutive postseason appearance. However, Mulder was unable to pitch in the postseason due to injury. Hudson began the postseason by going 6.2 innings and allowing three runs in Game 1 of the 2003 ALDS, as the A's defeated the Boston Red Sox 5–4. Zito had a strong outing for the A's in Game 2 of the ALDS giving up only one run in seven innings to lead the A's to a 5–1 win over the Red Sox and putting them ahead 2–0. The A's ended up losing Game 3 3–1 in 11 innings. Hudson exited Game 4 after just one inning due to a strained left oblique, and the A's lost Game 4 5–4. Zito took the mound for Game 5 and attempted to send the A's to the ALCS after three consecutive ALDS-Game 5 losses, but after pitching five scoreless innings, he would give up four runs in the sixth inning as the A's lost the Game 4-3 and were eliminated after losing Game 5 of the ALDS for the fourth consecutive year.

The following year, Hudson's season was cut short due to an injury that would prove to be costly for the A's as they finished second in the AL West and missed the playoffs for the first time since 1999.

== Aftermath and breakup ==
After the 2004 season, A's general manager Billy Beane traded Tim Hudson to the Atlanta Braves and Mark Mulder to the St. Louis Cardinals, breaking up the Big Three. Hudson spent nine seasons with the Braves, then his final two seasons for the San Francisco Giants, winning the 2014 World Series with the latter. Mulder spent four seasons with the Cardinals, after which he was released after suffering from rotator cuff and other shoulder problems during his tenure there. Those injuries prevented Mulder from appearing in the Cardinals' 2006 postseason run, culminating in the team's World Series championship. After remaining unsigned for a year and a half, he would announce his retirement on June 15, 2010, by saying "I guess I have retired."

Barry Zito spent two more seasons with the A's after they traded Hudson and Mulder. In the 2006 season, Zito finished with a 16–10 record, 3.83 ERA, and 151 strikeouts to help lead the A's to an AL West title. Zito had a strong outing for the A's in Game 1 of the ALDS as he only gave up one run in eight innings to lead the A's to a 3–2 win over the Minnesota Twins in Game 1. The A's ended up winning the next two games to sweep the Twins and advance to the 2006 ALCS for the first time since 1992, thereby winning a postseason series for the first time since they took the 1990 American League Championship Series. Zito took the mound for Game 1 of the ALCS against the Detroit Tigers but gave up five runs in 3.2 innings as the A's fell to the Tigers 5–1. The A's ended up losing the next three games, swept in four straight by the Tigers in the ALCS.

After the 2006 season, Zito signed with the San Francisco Giants, in what was at the time the largest contract for a pitcher, and played seven seasons with them. Zito won two World Series rings with the Giants in 2010 and 2012, but was not part of the Giants' 2010 postseason roster due to a poor second-half performance though he would have a larger role in the latter. After taking a year off from baseball in 2014, Zito spent one last season with the Oakland A's' Triple-A Affiliate, the Nashville Sounds. He was briefly called up to Oakland at the end of the 2015 season following an injury to one of their starters. This call-up, combined with a series against the Giants with a scheduled start by Hudson, set up an impromptu reunion of the Big Three. With Mulder in attendance, Zito started for the A's against Tim Hudson of the Giants in front of a sold-out crowd at Oakland Coliseum on September 26, 2015 - nearly 11 seasons after they last played together on the A's. The result was underwhelming, as both pitchers were knocked out early. Neither received a decision, as the Giants won by a score of 14-10.

After the 2015 season, both Hudson and Zito retired from baseball.
