= 2004 Major League Baseball All-Star Game =

2004 American baseball competition

	1	2	3	4	5	6	7	8	9	R	H	E
American League	6	0	0	1	0	2	0	0	0	9	14	0
National League	1	0	0	3	0	0	0	0	0	4	9	1
- Date: July 13, 2004
- Venue: Minute Maid Park
- City: Houston, Texas
- Managers: Joe Torre (NYY); Jack McKeon (FLA)
- MVP: Alfonso Soriano (TEX)
- Attendance: 41,886
- Ceremonial first pitch: Muhammad Ali
- Television: Fox (United States); MLB International (International)
- TV announcers: Joe Buck and Tim McCarver (Fox); Gary Thorne and Rick Sutcliffe (MLB International)
- Radio: ESPN
- Radio announcers: Dan Shulman and Dave Campbell

The 2004 Major League Baseball All-Star Game was the 75th edition of the midseason exhibition baseball game between the all-stars of the American League (AL) and National League (NL), the two leagues comprising Major League Baseball. The game was held on July 13, 2004, at Minute Maid Park in Houston, Texas, the home of the Houston Astros of the National League. The game resulted in the American League defeating the National League 9–4, thus awarding the AL home-field advantage in the 2004 World Series.

== Rosters ==
Players in italics have since been inducted into the National Baseball Hall of Fame.

=== American League ===
Elected starters
Position	Player	Team	All-Star Games
C	Iván Rodríguez	Tigers	11
1B	Jason Giambi	Yankees	5
2B	Alfonso Soriano	Rangers	3
3B	Alex Rodriguez	Yankees	8
SS	Derek Jeter	Yankees	6
OF	Vladimir Guerrero	Angels	5
OF	Manny Ramírez	Red Sox	8
OF	Ichiro Suzuki	Mariners	4

Pitchers
Position	Player	Team	All-Star Games
P	Francisco Cordero	Rangers	1
P	Tom Gordon	Yankees	2
P	Tim Hudson	Athletics	2
P	Ted Lilly	Blue Jays	1
P	Esteban Loaiza	White Sox	2
P	Mark Mulder	Athletics	2
P	Joe Nathan	Twins	1
P	Mariano Rivera	Yankees	6
P	Francisco Rodríguez	Angels	1
P	Kenny Rogers	Rangers	2
P	CC Sabathia	Indians	2
P	Curt Schilling	Red Sox	6
P	Javier Vázquez	Yankees	1
P	Jake Westbrook	Indians	1

Reserves
Position	Player	Team	All-Star Games
C	Víctor Martínez	Indians	1
1B	Ken Harvey	Royals	1
1B	David Ortiz	Red Sox	1
2B	Ronnie Belliard	Indians	1
3B	Hank Blalock	Rangers	2
SS	Carlos Guillén	Tigers	1
SS	Miguel Tejada	Orioles	2
SS	Michael Young	Rangers	1
OF	Carl Crawford	Devil Rays	1
OF	Matt Lawton	Indians	2
OF	Hideki Matsui ^{[FV]}	Yankees	2
OF	Gary Sheffield	Yankees	8

=== National League ===
Elected starters
Position	Player	Team	All-Star Games
C	Mike Piazza	Mets	11
1B	Albert Pujols	Cardinals	3
2B	Jeff Kent	Astros	4
3B	Scott Rolen	Cardinals	3
SS	Édgar Rentería	Cardinals	4
OF	Ken Griffey Jr.^{[a]}	Reds	12
OF	Barry Bonds	Giants	13
OF	Sammy Sosa	Cubs	7

Pitchers
Position	Player	Team	All-Star Games
P	Armando Benítez	Marlins	2
P	Roger Clemens	Astros	10
P	Éric Gagné	Dodgers	3
P	Tom Glavine	Mets	9
P	Danny Graves	Reds	2
P	Liván Hernández	Expos	1
P	Randy Johnson	Diamondbacks	10
P	Dan Kolb	Brewers	1
P	Carl Pavano	Marlins	1
P	Jason Schmidt	Giants	2
P	Ben Sheets	Brewers	2
P	Carlos Zambrano	Cubs	1

Reserves
Position	Player	Team	All-Star Games
C	Johnny Estrada	Braves	1
C	Paul Lo Duca	Dodgers	2
1B	Sean Casey	Reds	3
1B	Todd Helton	Rockies	5
1B	Jim Thome	Phillies	4
2B	Mark Loretta	Padres	1
3B	Mike Lowell	Marlins	3
SS	Barry Larkin	Reds	12
SS	Jack Wilson	Pirates	1
OF	Bobby Abreu^{[FV]}	Phillies	1
OF	Moisés Alou	Cubs	5
OF	Carlos Beltrán	Astros	1
OF	Miguel Cabrera	Marlins	1
OF	Lance Berkman^{[b]}	Astros	3

Notes

- ^{a} Player was selected to start, but did not play due to injury.
- ^{b} Player was selected as a reserve, but became a starting replacement.
- ^{FV} Player was selected by the fans through the All-Star Final Vote.

== Game ==
=== Umpires ===
Home Plate	Ed Montague
First Base	John Hirschbeck
Second Base	Doug Eddings
Third Base	Jim Reynolds
Left Field	Marvin Hudson
Right Field	Sam Holbrook

=== Starting lineups ===
American League				National League			
Order	Player	Team	Position	Order	Player	Team	Position
1	Ichiro Suzuki	Mariners	CF	1	Édgar Rentería	Cardinals	SS
2	Iván Rodríguez	Tigers	C	2	Albert Pujols	Cardinals	1B
3	Vladimir Guerrero	Angels	RF	3	Barry Bonds	Giants	LF
4	Manny Ramírez	Red Sox	LF	4	Scott Rolen	Cardinals	3B
5	Alex Rodriguez	Yankees	3B	5	Sammy Sosa	Cubs	RF
6	Jason Giambi	Yankees	1B	6	Mike Piazza	Mets	C
7	Derek Jeter	Yankees	SS	7	Lance Berkman	Astros	CF
8	Alfonso Soriano	Rangers	2B	8	Jeff Kent	Astros	2B
9	Mark Mulder	Athletics	P	9	Roger Clemens	Astros	P

=== Game recap ===
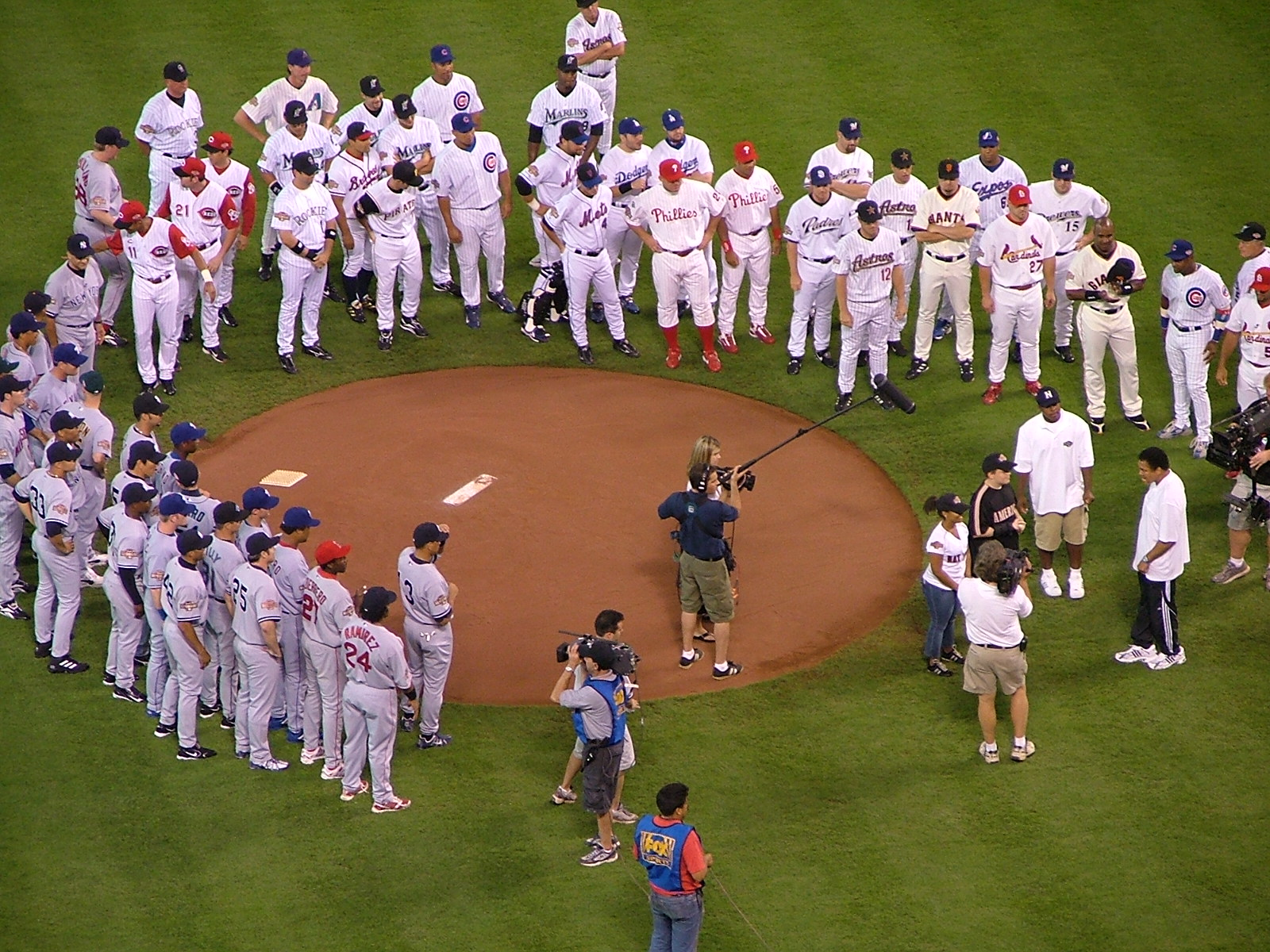
All-Star Game participants gather around the mound before the first pitch.

Tuesday, July 13, 2004 7:35 pm (CDT) at Minute Maid Park in Houston, Texas
Team	1	2	3	4	5	6	7	8	9	R	H	E
American League	6	0	0	1	0	2	0	0	0	9	14	0
National League	1	0	0	3	0	0	0	0	0	4	9	1
WP: Mark Mulder (1–0) LP: Roger Clemens (0–1); Home runs: AL: Manny Ramírez (1), Alfonso Soriano (1), David Ortiz (1); NL: None

== National Anthems ==
The Canadian national anthem was sung by The Tragically Hip lead vocalist Gord Downie. The American national anthem was sung by American Idol Season 3 winner Fantasia Barrino.

== Home Run Derby ==
Minute Maid Park, Houston—A.L. 47, N.L. 41
Player	Team	Round 1	Semis	Finals	Total
Miguel Tejada	Baltimore	7	15	5	27
Lance Berkman	Houston	7	10	4	21
Rafael Palmeiro	Baltimore	9	5	–	14
Barry Bonds	San Francisco	8	3	–	11
Sammy Sosa	Chicago (N)	5	–	–	5
Jim Thome	Philadelphia	4	–	–	4
Hank Blalock	Texas	3	–	–	3
David Ortiz	Boston	3	–	–	3

== Trivia ==
- Jack McKeon became the oldest manager to manage an All-Star game after becoming the oldest manager to manage a World Series in 2003 with the Florida Marlins.
- Roger Clemens gave up six runs in one inning for the first time in his major-league career.
- In the top of the first inning, the American League hit for the cycle for the first time in All-Star Game history.
- This was the first All-Star Game to be broadcast in high-definition.
- This was also the first All-Star Game in which Joe Buck, the play-by-play announcer for Fox, announced the coaches, reserves, managers and starters for both the American League and National League.
- Carlos Beltrán was originally selected to start in the outfield for the AL and represent the Kansas City Royals, but was traded to Houston a few weeks before this game, but still played in the game as a defensive substitution for Lance Berkman. Beltrán was on the roster because original starter Ken Griffey Jr. was hurt and Beltrán took his spot as a substitute.
- This was also the last All-Star Game for Hall of Fame shortstop Barry Larkin, as he would retire before the 2005 season.
- The day after hosting the game, the Astros fired manager Jimy Williams and replaced him with Phil Garner.
