= Mark Mulder =

American baseball player (born 1977)

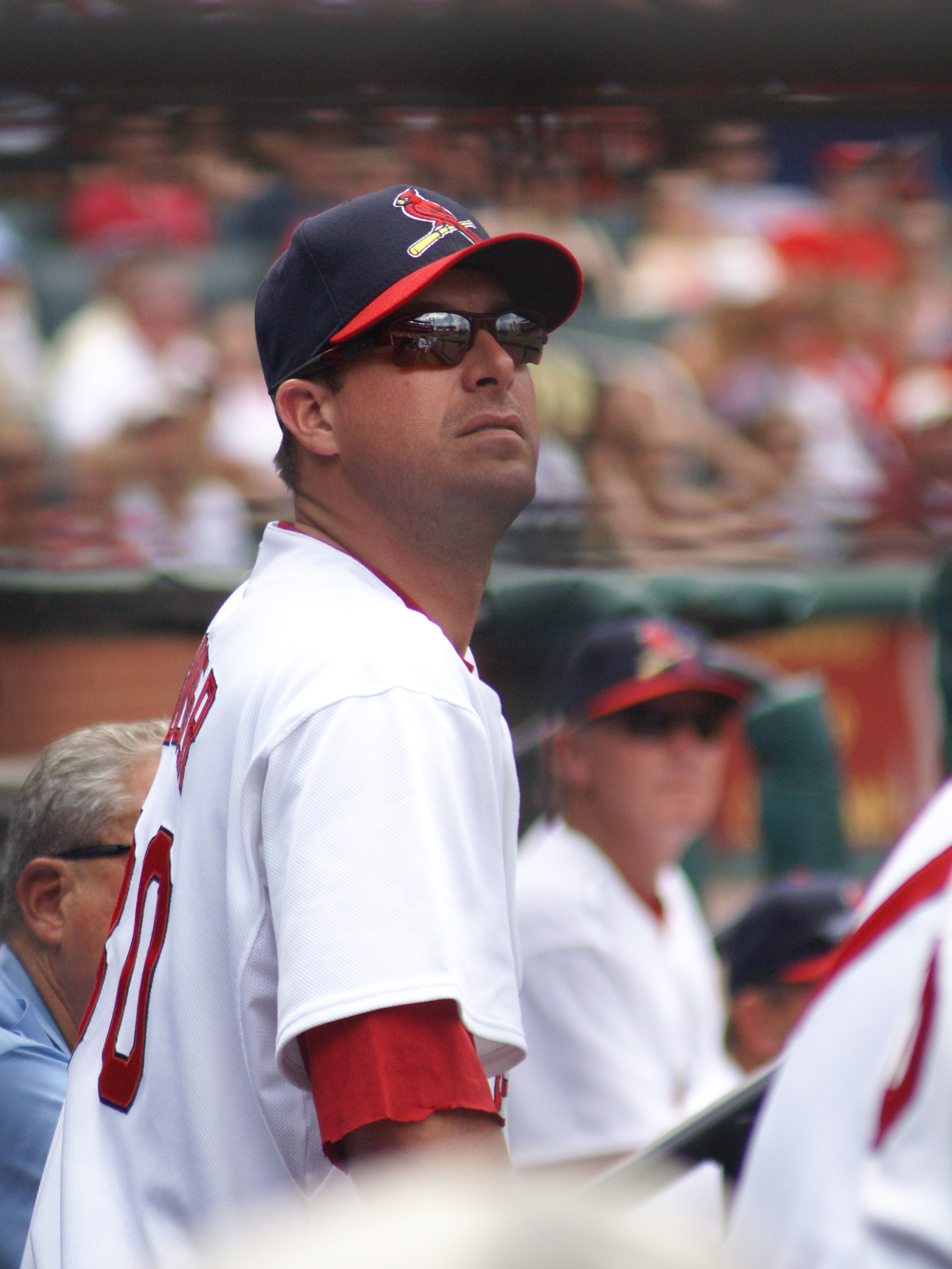
- Pitcher
- Born: August 5, 1977 (age 48); South Holland, Illinois, U.S.
- Batted: Left Threw: Left

MLB debut
- April 18, 2000, for the Oakland Athletics

Last MLB appearance
- July 9, 2008, for the St. Louis Cardinals

MLB statistics
- Win–loss record: 103–60
- Earned run average: 4.18
- Strikeouts: 834
- Stats at Baseball Reference

Teams
- Oakland Athletics (2000–2004); St. Louis Cardinals (2005–2008)

Career highlights and awards
- 2× All-Star (2003, 2004); AL wins leader (2001); Athletics Hall of Fame
Medals
Men's baseball
Representing United States
Pan American Games
Silver medal – second place	1999 Winnipeg	Team competition

Mark Alan Mulder (born August 5, 1977) is an American former professional baseball player. A left-handed starting pitcher, Mulder pitched in Major League Baseball (MLB) for the Oakland Athletics and St. Louis Cardinals. He is a two-time All-Star.

== Early life ==
Mark Alan Mulder was born on August 5, 1977, in South Holland, Illinois.

== College career ==
Mulder attended Michigan State University, where he played college baseball for the Michigan State Spartans. In 1997, he played collegiate summer baseball in the Cape Cod Baseball League for the Bourne Braves, and was named a league all-star.

== Professional career ==
=== Draft and minor leagues ===
Mulder was selected by the Oakland Athletics with the second overall pick in the 1998 MLB draft.

=== Oakland Athletics (2000–2004) ===
He was placed on the fast track to MLB and made his MLB debut on April 18, 2000; he was still only 22 years old and had less than two seasons of minor-league experience. He had a rocky start to his MLB career, going 9–10 with a 5.44 ERA.

In 2001, Mulder played his first full major-league season and quickly became a dominant pitcher. Leading the American League with 21 wins, he anchored a powerful Oakland rotation along with Barry Zito and Tim Hudson, called "The Big Three". Mulder finished second in AL Cy Young Award voting behind Roger Clemens. He continued to do well in 2002, winning 19 games and striking out a career-high 159 batters in 207.1 innings. Limited by injuries in 2003, he would only log 26 starts, he still won 15 games and had a career-best 3.13 ERA. 2004 was an inconsistent year for Mulder. He started the season strong, and was chosen to start that season's All-Star Game. However, he had a higher ERA and walked more batters in the second half of the season.

Mulder, Hudson, and Zito were able to carry their team to the postseason four seasons in a row (2000–2003). Mulder competed in the playoffs in 2001 and 2002, logging two starts each against the New York Yankees (2001) and the Minnesota Twins (2002). He carried over his strong regular-season performance by pitching 24 innings in the four playoff starts, with an ERA of 2.25 and 19 strikeouts.

=== St. Louis Cardinals (2005–2008) ===
After the 2004 season, the Athletics traded Mulder to the St. Louis Cardinals in exchange for Dan Haren, Kiko Calero, and Daric Barton. In the 2005 season, Mulder's first with the Cardinals, he pitched well, 16–8 with a 3.64 ERA. His efforts helped the Cardinals reach the NLCS, where they lost to the Houston Astros.

Mulder began the 2006 season strong, with a 5–1 record and 3.69 ERA through May 17. However, his next six starts were mediocre to awful, and his ERA ballooned to 6.09. He turned out to be suffering from rotator cuff and shoulder problems, and the Cardinals placed him on the disabled list on June 23. In August, he was taken off the disabled list and made several starts in the minors. On August 23, he made his first major-league start in two months and gave up nine runs, all of which were earned, in three innings.

After undergoing rotator cuff surgery, and with a return for the opening of the 2007 season unlikely, Mulder's future with the Cardinals looked somewhat uncertain in the 2007 offseason. However, despite being offered comparable deals with the Cleveland Indians and the Texas Rangers, Mulder re-signed with the St. Louis Cardinals on January 10, to a two-year $13 million contract, with performance-based incentives and a club option that could take the deal to three years at a possible $45 million.

After being re-activated on September 5, 2007, he continued to struggle with his command, losing all three of his starts with an ERA of 12.27. In that time, he pitched only 11 innings, and gave up 22 hits and seven walks. This prompted an MRI scan, which led the team to the conclusion that Mulder needed additional clean-up rotator cuff surgery. Although he was expected to recover from surgery in time for Spring training, Mark started the 2008 season on the disabled list. On June 30, 2008, Mulder made his return. He came in from the bullpen with a 7–1 lead over the New York Mets in the top of the ninth. Mulder finished the ballgame with no runs. On July 9, 2008, Mulder started his first game of the season against the Philadelphia Phillies. After striking out Jimmy Rollins to begin the game, Mulder threw eight consecutive pitches out of the strike zone, and left the game with a shoulder injury while attempting a pickoff throw.

After the 2008 season, the Cardinals chose not to exercise Mulder's $11 million option for the 2009 season, instead buying out his contract for $1.5 million. After remaining unsigned, Mulder announced his retirement on June 15, 2010, saying "I guess I have retired."

=== 2014 comeback attempt ===
While watching the 2013 MLB postseason, Mulder began to mimic the throwing motion of Paco Rodriguez, and felt the hand separation at the top of the delivery felt natural. Mulder began auditioning for teams in November 2013. On January 1, 2014, Mulder came to terms with the Los Angeles Angels of Anaheim on a minor league deal with an invitation to spring training.

Mulder expressed going into spring training that his shoulder felt strong, but wondered about the susceptibility of his lower back and legs to injury. On February 15, Mulder tore his achilles tendon. He suffered the injury in agility drills on the second day of spring training, before he was scheduled to throw his first bullpen session. The Angels released Mulder on March 11.

=== Accomplishments ===
- Led American League in wins in 2001 (21)
- Led American League pitchers in complete games in 2003 (9) and 2004 (5)
- Led American League in shutouts in 2001 (4) and 2003 (2)
- American League All-Star, 2003 and 2004

== Post-playing career ==
After first retiring from baseball, Mulder pursued golf. He won the 2015 American Century Championship, considered to be the ‘premier’ celebrity golf tournament. He won it again in 2016, successfully defending his title. On July 16, 2017, he won his third straight American Century Championship. In October 2018, he played in a PGA Tour event, the Safeway Open, via a sponsor's invitation.

Mulder is annually one of the contenders at what is now the Diamond Resorts Tournament of Champions. He won the celebrity division in 2017.

He also served as an analyst on ESPN's Baseball Tonight, and as part-time analyst for Athletics telecasts on NBC Sports California in 2016 and 2017.

== See also ==
- List of Major League Baseball annual wins leaders

Awards and achievements
Preceded by Esteban Loaiza	American League All-Star Game Starting Pitcher; 2004	Succeeded by Mark Buehrle
