= Tim Hudson =

American baseball player (born 1975)

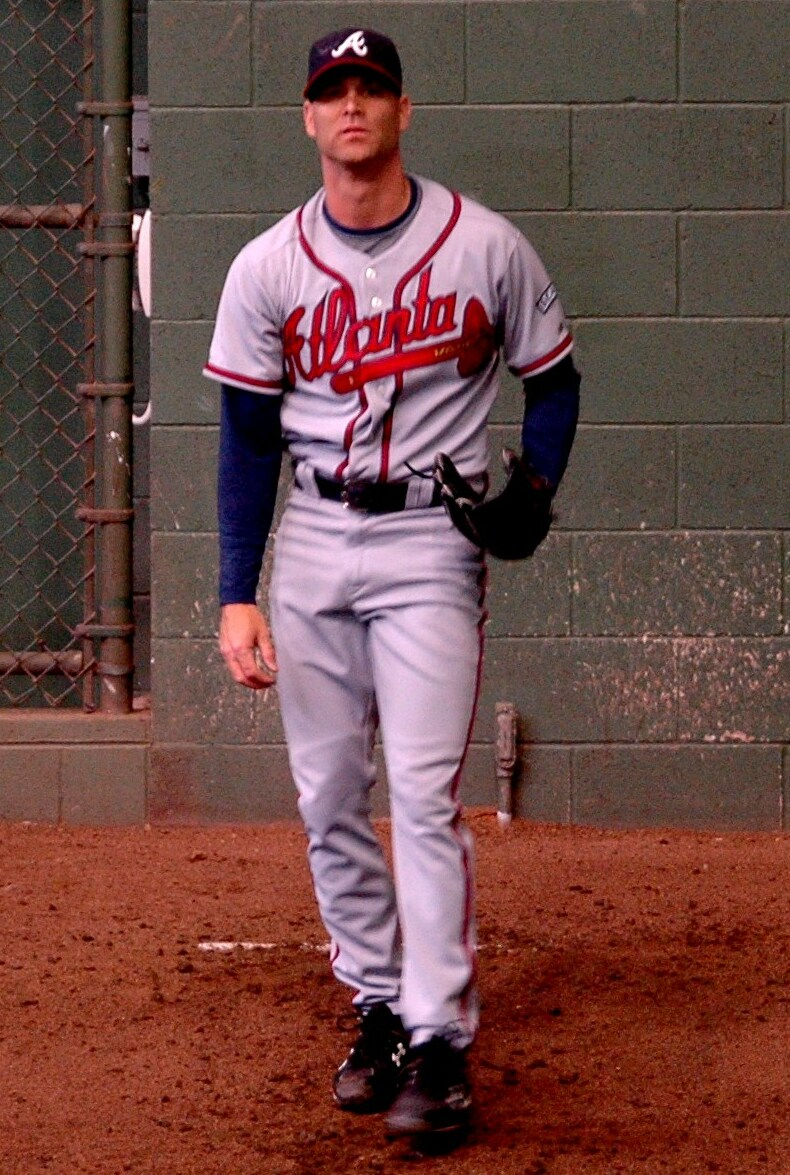
- Hudson with the Atlanta Braves in 2008
- Pitcher
- Born: July 14, 1975 (age 51); Columbus, Georgia, U.S.
- Batted: Right Threw: Right

MLB debut
- June 8, 1999, for the Oakland Athletics

Last MLB appearance
- October 1, 2015, for the San Francisco Giants

MLB statistics
- Win–loss record: 222–133
- Earned run average: 3.49
- Strikeouts: 2,080
- Stats at Baseball Reference

Teams
- Oakland Athletics (1999–2004); Atlanta Braves (2005–2013); San Francisco Giants (2014–2015)

Career highlights and awards
- 4× All-Star (2000, 2004, 2010, 2014); World Series champion (2014); NL Comeback Player of the Year (2010); AL wins leader (2000); Athletics Hall of Fame; Braves Hall of Fame

Timothy Adam Hudson (born July 14, 1975), nicknamed "Huddy", is an American former professional baseball pitcher of Major League Baseball (MLB). After playing in college for Chattahoochee Valley Community College and Auburn University, Hudson played in the major leagues for the Oakland Athletics (1999–2004), Atlanta Braves (2005–13), and San Francisco Giants (2014–15). With the Giants, he won the 2014 World Series over the Kansas City Royals.

During his 17-season career, Hudson established himself as one of baseball's most consistent pitchers and until 2014 had never had a season where he suffered more losses than wins. Hudson was also named an All-Star four times: twice with Oakland, once with Atlanta, and once with San Francisco.

Before retiring in 2015, Hudson led active major league pitchers in most wins and one of four active pitchers with at least 200 career wins. With a win against the Oakland A's on July 26, 2015, he has won a game against every team in the majors, the 15th pitcher to do so. Hudson is one of 21 pitchers in major league history to win at least 200 games, strike out at least 2,000 batters and have a winning percentage above .600. Of those 21, 14 are in the National Baseball Hall of Fame.

== Early life ==
Timothy Adam Hudson was born on July 14, 1975, in Columbus, Georgia. Hudson attended Glenwood School in Phenix City, Alabama where in his senior season he led the team to the 1993 AISA state championship. He finished his high school career with a 12–1 record and a 1.78 ERA. Despite his record, Hudson was considered undersized by scouts at 6'0" tall and 160 pounds and was not offered a scholarship to a major college. Hudson decided to attend a local two-year college, Chattahoochee Valley Community College (CVCC).

== College career ==
In 1994, his freshman year at CVCC, he earned First-team All American honors while leading his team to the AJCCC Division II championship. He also led CVCC team in batting average (.385), home runs (9), RBI (42), wins (10–2), strikeouts (76), and was second on the team with a 2.76 ERA. As a sophomore, he was named Second-team All American and set a school and conference record with 117 strikeouts which also led the nation. As a hitter, Hudson batted .345 with five home runs, and 29 RBI. His sophomore season ERA of 1.95 was the team and conference best.

Prior to his junior year, Hudson transferred to Auburn University where he would play two seasons. He is still at or near the top of many school records. In 1997, he played all 65 games for the Tigers while both pitching and playing outfield. That season, he hit .396 with 18 home runs and 95 RBI. As a pitcher, he finished 15–2 with a 2.97 ERA to earn SEC Player of the Year and consensus All-American honors. Hudson was the first player to be named First Team All-SEC at two positions (P, OF) in the same year. He was drafted by the Oakland Athletics in the sixth round of the 1997 amateur draft.

== Professional career ==
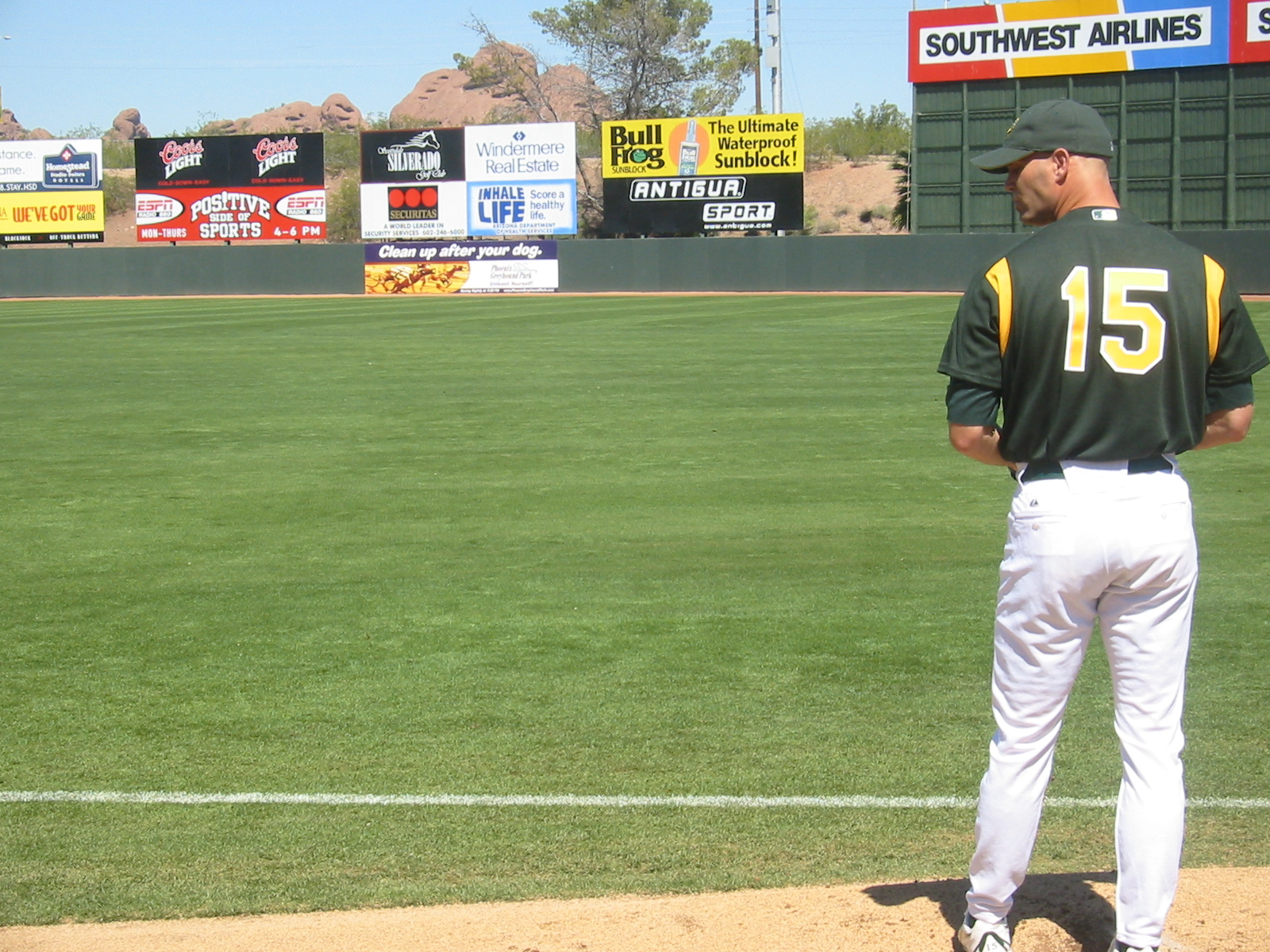
Hudson with the Oakland Athletics in 2004 spring training

=== Drafts and minor leagues ===
Hudson was drafted by the Oakland Athletics twice, in the 35th round of the 1994 MLB draft and again in the 6th round of the 1997 MLB draft, signing in 1997.

=== Oakland Athletics (1999–2004) ===
Hudson made his Major League debut with a five inning start on June 8, 1999, against the San Diego Padres, where he allowed three earned runs in a game the Athletics eventually lost 5–3. He recorded his first career win in his next start, on June 13 against the Los Angeles Dodgers. He allowed only one run in seven innings of the 9–3 victory.

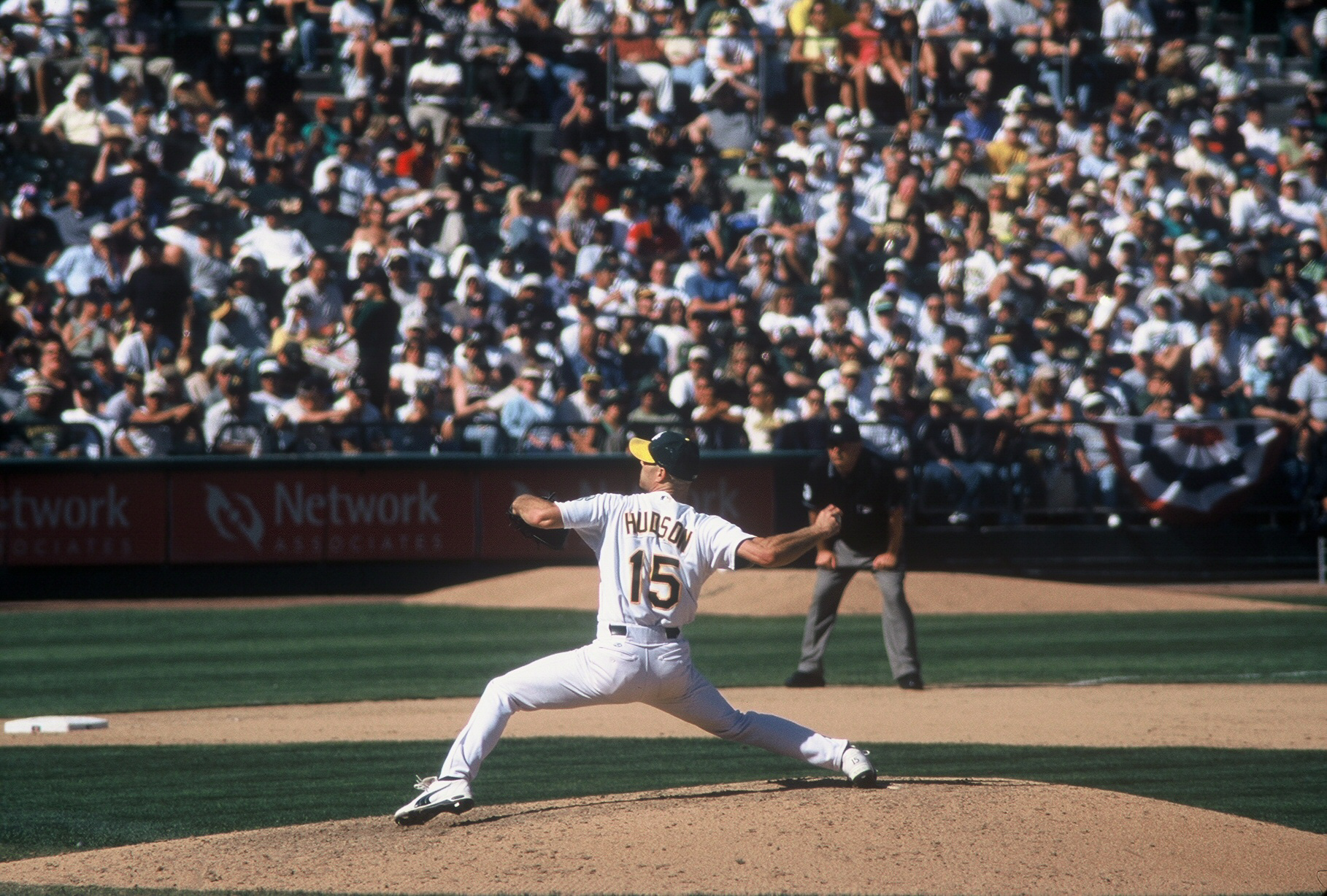
Hudson with Oakland

In his rookie season, Hudson had an 11–2 mark and finished 5th in the AL Rookie of the Year vote. He became a member of Oakland's so-called "Big Three", along with left-handed pitchers Mark Mulder and Barry Zito. In 2000, he posted a career-high 20 victories along with a 4.14 ERA for Oakland. He finished second in AL Cy Young Award voting behind Pedro Martínez. Over the course of the next three seasons, Hudson's records were 18-9 in 2001, 15–9 in 2002 and 16–7 in 2003 with a career low 2.70 ERA. In 2004, Hudson failed to pitch 30 games due to injury. He went 12–6 in 27 starts. Hudson's record while with the A's was 92–39, and an ERA of 3.30.

=== Atlanta Braves (2005–2013) ===
Before the 2005 season, Hudson was traded to the Atlanta Braves in exchange for Charles Thomas, Dan Meyer, and Juan Cruz. On August 6, 2005, Hudson won his 100th career game, defeating the St. Louis Cardinals 8–1.

In January 2006, Hudson was named to the Team USA roster for the 2006 World Baseball Classic.

His second season with the Braves was disappointing. He posted career-highs in losses (12) and ERA (4.86) in 2006. He returned to his earlier form in 2007 however, finishing with a 16–10 record and a 3.33 ERA. He was in the midst of a nine-game winning streak, the second of his career, at one point in the season. Hudson struck out a career-high 13 batters on April 25 against the Florida Marlins.

On April 29, 2007, both Hudson's grandmother and St. Louis Cardinals relief pitcher Josh Hancock, his college teammate at Auburn, died. He drew his grandmother's initials on the pitcher's mound before his next start, and wore them on his spikes. He also sewed Hancock's initials (JH) on his jersey. He pitched eight innings, giving up two earned runs against the Philadelphia Phillies. He did not get a decision, but the Braves ultimately won, 5–2.

Hudson is one of only seven ballplayers who pitched in the NL in 2007 who won at least 12 games in each year from 2004 to 2007, the others being Carlos Zambrano, Greg Maddux, Roy Oswalt, Jason Marquis, Derek Lowe, and Jeff Suppan.

On August 2, 2008, Hudson revealed that he would undergo Tommy John ligament transplant surgery on his pitching elbow, and missed the remainder of the 2008 season. He started the 2009 season on the 60-day DL, and did not play prior to the All Star break. On July 2, 2009, he threw a 90-pitch bullpen session and Atlanta Braves manager Bobby Cox said: "He's ready to go. ... He's really come along. He's got major-league stuff right now, his normal stuff." But Cox added that the Braves would not rush the timetable on Hudson's return, which was scheduled for mid- to late-August. Hudson's first minor-league rehab start was tentatively scheduled for July 19 at Class A Myrtle Beach. After completing several minor league rehab sessions, Hudson returned to the Atlanta Braves starting pitching rotation on September 1, 2009. He gave up only two runs and earned his first win of the 2009 season.

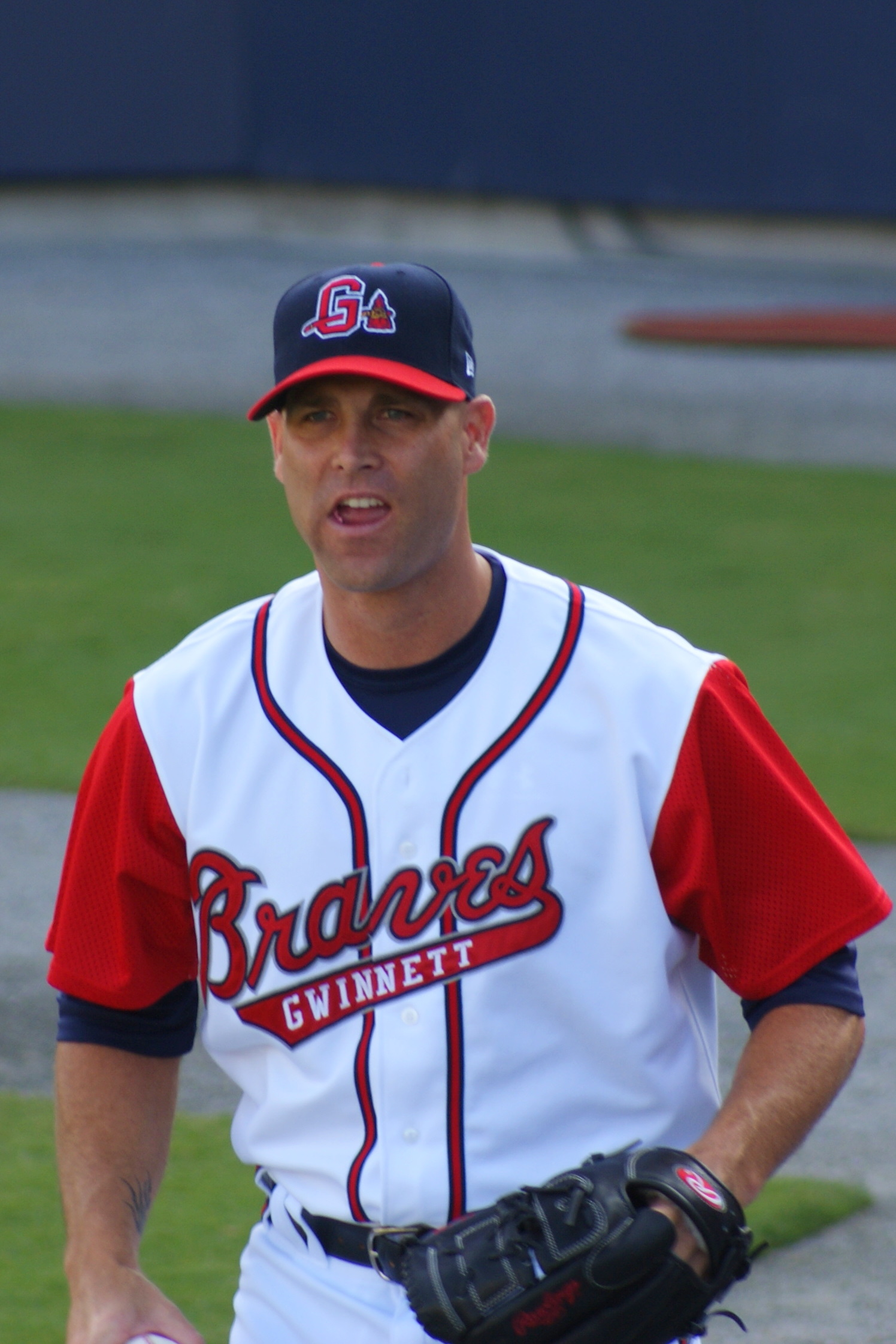
Hudson in 2009

On November 12, 2009, Hudson signed a $28 million, three-year extension with the Braves with a $9 million option for a fourth year. On August 28, 2010, against the Florida Marlins, Hudson set a career high in strikeouts with 13.

On October 5, 2010, Hudson was awarded the 2010 NL Comeback Player of the Year Award.

On June 20, 2011, in Atlanta, Hudson hit his second career home run, a two-run shot which accounted for the only scoring in a 2–0 victory over the Toronto Blue Jays. On the same day, he got his 1,600th strikeout in the top of the fifth inning against J. P. Arencibia. On July 15, 2011, Hudson was the winning pitcher in the Braves' 10,000th win in franchise history.

Hudson went 16–7 with a 3.62 ERA in 2012. On October 30, 2012, Hudson had his $9 million option exercised by the Braves.

On April 30, 2013, Hudson became the 113th major league pitcher to reach 200 wins, with an 8–1 victory over the Washington Nationals at Turner Field. Hudson went seven innings, giving up only three hits and one run while recording six strikeouts and two walks. Hudson also went 2-for-3 at the plate with a double and a home run. On July 24, 2013, Hudson was pitching a four-hit shutout against the New York Mets when Eric Young, Jr., who was trying to beat a throw to first base, accidentally stepped on Hudson's leg above the ankle. This resulted in an ankle fracture that ended Hudson's 2013 season. After the season, Hudson became a free agent. His record with the Braves was 113–72 with an ERA of 3.56.

=== San Francisco Giants (2014–2015) ===
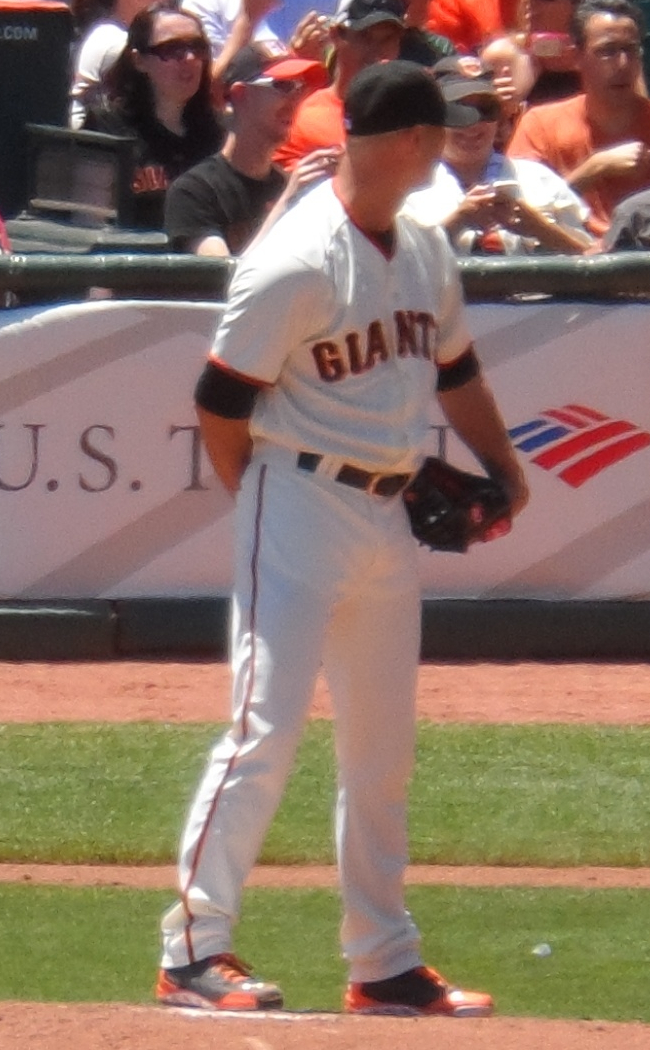
Hudson with the San Francisco Giants

On November 18, 2013, Hudson agreed to a two-year, $23 million contract with the San Francisco Giants. Hudson set a franchise record by pitching 30 2/3 innings in the season before issuing a walk. The streak was snapped on April 25 when he walked Carlos Santana. Hudson posted at the time a Major League-best and leading 1.81 ERA in his first 13 starts with the Giants, the lowest in 104 years in the 133-year history of the franchise. In his first year with the Giants, he was selected to participate in the All-Star Game. Accomplishing this feat, he has made the All-Star team at least once with every team he has pitched for. On August 27, in a 4–2 team win over the Colorado Rockies at AT&T Park, Hudson recorded his 2,000th career strikeout. He started Game 2 of the NLDS, a game that went 18 innings; Hudson also started the only other postseason game to go longer than 16 innings while on the Braves in 2005. On October 29, Hudson became the oldest pitcher to start Game 7 of the World Series. The Giants went on to win the game, 3–2, and the series, 4–3, over the Kansas City Royals, giving Hudson the first and only World Series ring of his 16-year career.

Prior to the 2015 season, Hudson stated it would likely be his last. Following a 4–3 win against the Oakland Athletics on July 26, 2015, Hudson became the 15th pitcher in MLB history to register at least one win against all 30 current teams. On September 26, 2015, Hudson started against Zito and the Athletics in a matchup that was arranged as a tribute to the A's "Big Three" of the early 2000s. Both pitchers received lengthy standing ovations from the sold-out Oakland Coliseum crowd (which included the third Big Three member, Mulder) upon leaving the game.

On October 1 at AT&T Park, Hudson started his final major league game. Giants manager Bruce Bochy made a pitching change, allowing Hudson to receive a standing ovation from his family, friends, and Giants announcers, executives, and fans as he walked off the mound. As he reached the dugout steps, he was greeted and embraced by all of his teammates and coaches outside and inside of it. On October 3 at AT&T Park, during Fan Appreciation Weekend, the Giants honored Hudson with a pregame ceremony surrounded by his family, friends, Giants teammates, coaches, and executives. The event was broadcast live on local television on Comcast SportsNet Bay Area, where Giants sportscaster Jon Miller served as MC. The ceremony included a taped video message from his Hall of Fame Braves manager Bobby Cox, speeches from president and chief executive officer Larry Baer, Bochy, and starting rotation mates Jake Peavy and Madison Bumgarner, before Hudson emotionally addressed the crowd.

== Scouting report ==
Hudson was a sinkerballer, using that pitch about half the time and at a speed of 87–91 mph. His next-most used pitch was a cutter at 84–87. He expanded his repertoire to left-handers with a curveball (75–77) and splitter (78–81). He also had a four-seam fastball (88–91 mph). His favored pitch with two strikes to right-handed hitters was his cutter, while he stayed with the sinker to lefties.

== Achievements ==
- Professional
  - 2010 Hutch Award winner
  - Nominated for the Roberto Clemente Award by his team in 2006 and 2007
  - Major League record for the longest streak of 10 or more wins and nine or fewer losses in a season (seven straight from 1999 to 2005)
  - 2010 NL Comeback Player of the Year Award
  - Four-time All-Star (2000, 2004, 2010, 2014)
  - 3-time Top 10 in American League Cy Young Award voting (2000–01, 2003)
  - Led MLB in winning percentage (2000)
  - Led AL in wins (20, 2000)
  - Led AL in games started (35, 2001)
  - Twice led AL in shutouts (2003–04)
  - Twice second in AL in shutouts (2000, 2002)
  - 5-time 15-game winner (2000–03, 2007)
  - 3-time Athletics' Opening Day starter (from 2001 to 2004)
  - Pitched three complete-game one-hitters: August 28, 2000, against the Chicago White Sox; May 1, 2006, against the Colorado Rockies; and May 4, 2011, against the Milwaukee Brewers.
  - 2014 World Series Champion
  - On July 26, 2015, became 15th pitcher to record a win against all 30 major league clubs.
- College
  - Won Rotary Smith Award (1997)
  - Consensus All-American (1997)
  - NCAA East Regional Tournament MVP (1997)
  - SEC Player of the Year (1997)
  - All-SEC, both pitcher and outfielder (1997)
  - ABCA All-South Region, both pitcher and outfielder (1997)
  - Led NCAA in winning games (15, 1997)

== Coaching career ==
In 2016, Hudson served as a guest instructor in spring training for both the Braves and Giants. In 2017, Hudson returned as a spring training instructor for the Giants. He served in the same role for the Braves in 2018. In January 2020, Hudson was named the pitching coach for the Auburn Tigers.

On July 27, 2022, it was announced Hudson would be stepping away from Auburn. Shortly thereafter, Hudson accepted the position as head coach of the Lee-Scott Academy baseball team. He stepped down from that position after one season, still coaching as a volunteer.

== Broadcasting career ==
In 2016, Hudson joined Fox Sports South and Fox Sports Southeast as a part-time broadcaster for select Braves games.

== Personal life ==
Hudson and his wife he met while he was a student at Auburn. They have two daughters and one son. They currently live in Auburn, Alabama. Hudson and his wife are active with their philanthropy for children, the Hudson Family Foundation.

Hudson is a Christian.

== See also ==
- Atlanta Braves award winners and league leaders
- Oakland Athletics award winners and league leaders
- List of Major League Baseball annual shutout leaders
- List of Major League Baseball career games started leaders
- List of Major League Baseball career putouts as a pitcher leaders
- List of Major League Baseball career strikeout leaders
- List of Major League Baseball career wins leaders
- List of World Series starting pitchers
