= Kansas City Royals all-time roster =

List of baseball players

This is the all-time roster for Major League Baseball's Kansas City Royals.

== All-time roster ==
Key: RHOF, Royals Hall of Fame inductee; MSHOF, Missouri Sports Hall of Fame inductee

Players in Bold are members of the National Baseball Hall of Fame.

Players in Italics have had their numbers retired by the team.

=== A ===
- Paul Abbott, SP, 2003
- Brent Abernathy, 2B, 2003
- Ted Abernathy, P, 1970–72
- Albert Abreu, P, 2022
- Tony Abreu, IF, 2012
- Jerry Adair, 2B, 1969–70
- Jason Adam, P, 2018
- Chance Adams, P, 2020
- Nathan Adcock, P, 2011–12
- Jeremy Affeldt, P, 2002–06
- Willie Aikens, 1B, 1980–83
- Hanser Alberto, 2B, 2021
- Al Alburquerque, P, 2017
- Luis Alcaraz, 2B, 1969–70
- CJ Alexander, IF, 2024
- Scott Alexander, P, 2015–17
- Luis Alicea, 2B/DH 2001–02
- Jermaine Allensworth, OF, 1998
- Abraham Almonte, OF, 2018
- Miguel Almonte, P, 2015, 2017
- Dan Altavilla, P, 2024
- Chip Ambres, OF, 2005
- Brian Anderson, P, 2003–05
- Josh Anderson, CF, 2009
- Nick Anderson, P, 2024
- Rick Anderson, P, 1987–88
- Scott Anderson, SP, 1995
- Steve Andrade, P, 2006
- Norm Angelini, P, 1972–73
- Rick Ankiel, OF, 2010
- Norichika Aoki, OF, 2014
- Kevin Appier, SP, 1989–99, 2003–04
- Luis Aquino, P, 1988–92
- Mike Armstrong, P, 1982–83
- Humberto Arteaga, SS, 2019
- Miguel Asencio, SP, 2002–03
- Tucker Ashford, 3B, 1984
- Jeff Austin, P, 2001–02
- Luinder Avila, P, 2025-present
- Mike Avilés, SS, 2008–11

=== B ===
- Cory Bailey, P, 2001–02
- Homer Bailey, P, 2019
- Paul Bako, C, 2006
- Steve Balboni, 1B, DH, 1984–88
- John Bale, P, 2007–09
- Jay Baller, P, 1990
- Scott Bankhead, SP, 1986
- Brian Bannister, SP, 2007–10
- Floyd Bannister, SP, 1988–89
- Brian Barber, SP, 1998–99
- Scott Barlow, P, 2018-23
- Jacob Barnes, P, 2019
- German Barranca, 2B, 3B, 1979–80
- Randy Bass, 1B, 1978
- Miguel Batista, SP, 2000
- Denny Bautista, SP, 2004–06
- José Bautista, 3B, OF, 2004
- Jonah Bayliss, P, 2005
- Matt Beaty, OF, IF, 2023
- Joe Beckwith, P, 1984–85
- Tim Belcher, SP, 1996–98
- Stan Belinda, P, 1993–94
- Jay Bell, SS, 1997
- Terry Bell, C, 1986
- **Carlos Beltrán**, OF, 1998–2004
- Juan Beníquez, OF, IF, DH, 1987
- Yamil Benítez, OF, 1997
- Andrew Benintendi, OF, 2021-22
- Todd Benzinger, 1B, 1991
- Juan Berenguer, P, 1981, 1992
- Brandon Berger, OF, 2001–04
- Ryan Bergert, P, 2025-present
- Adam Bernero, SP, 2006
- Ángel Berroa, SS, 2001–07
- Sean Berry, 3B, 1990–91
- Yuniesky Betancourt, SS, 2009–10, '12
- Wilson Betemit, 3B, 2010–11
- Kurt Bevacqua, IF/OF/DH, 1973–74
- Brian Bevil, P, 1996–98
- Buddy Biancalana, SS, 2B, 1982–87
- Cavan Biggio, 2B, 2025
- Doug Bird, P, 1973–78
- Bud Black, SP, 1982–88
- Andrés Blanco, SS, 2B, 2004–06
- Dairon Blanco, OF, 2022-present
- Gregor Blanco, OF, 2010
- Scott Blewett, P, 2020-21
- Willie Bloomquist, OF, SS, 2009–10
- Vida Blue, SP, 1982–83
- Jaime Bluma, P, 1996
- Doug Bochtler, P, 2000
- Mike Boddicker, SP, 1991–92
- Ronald Bolaños, P, 2020-22
- Ricky Bones, P, 1997–98
- Emilio Bonifacio, 2B, 2013
- Jorge Bonifacio, OF, 2017–19
- Chris Booker, P, 2006
- Bob Boone, C, 1989–90; Manager, 1995–97
- Pat Borders, C, 1995
- Thad Bosley, OF, DH, 1987–88
- Derek Botelho, P, 1982
- Ricky Bottalico, P, 2000
- Jason Bourgeois, OF, 2012
- Jonathan Bowlan, P, 2023-25
- Brad Boxberger, P, 2019
- Blaine Boyer, P, 2018
- Jackie Bradley Jr., OF, 2023
- Ryan Braun, P, 2006–07
- Steve Braun, OF, 3B, DH, 1978–80
- Craig Brazell, 1B, 2007
- #5 **George Brett**, 3B, 1B, DH, 1973–93, RHOF, MSHOF
- Ken Brett, P, 1980–81
- Jake Brentz, P, 2021-22
- Billy Brewer, P, 1993–95
- Mike Brewer, OF, 1986
- Nelson Briles, SP, 1974–75
- Juan Brito, C, 2002
- Hubie Brooks, OF, DH, 1B, 1993–94
- Adrian Brown, OF, 2004
- Dee Brown, OF, DH, 1998–2004
- Emil Brown, OF, 2005–07
- Tom Browning, SP, 1995
- Jonathan Broxton, P, 2012
- Tom Bruno, P, 1976
- Kris Bubic, P, 2020-present
- Bob Buchanan, P, 1989
- Ryan Buchter, P, 2017
- John Buck, C, 2004–09
- Bill Buckner, DH, 1B, 1988–89
- Billy Buckner, P, 2007
- Francisley Bueno, P, 2012–14
- Ryan Bukvich, P, 2002–04
- Bryan Bullington, P, 2010
- Melvin Bunch, P, 1995
- Wally Bunker, SP, 1969–71
- Tom Burgmeier, P, 1969–73
- Ambiorix Burgos, P, 2005–06
- Enrique Burgos, P, 1993
- Morgan Burkhart, 1B, DH, 2003
- Billy Burns (baseball), OF, 2016–17
- Steve Busby, SP, 1972–76, 1978–80, RHOF (1986)
- Drew Butera, C, 2015–18
- Bill Butler, SP, 1969–71
- Billy Butler, DH, 1B, 2007–14
- Paul Byrd, SP, 2001–02
- Tim Byrdak, P, 1998–00

=== C ===
- Melky Cabrera, OF, 2011, 2017
- Edgar Cáceres, 2B, IF, 1995
- Greg Cadaret, P, 1993
- Jac Caglianone, 1B/OF, 2025-Present
- Trevor Cahill, P, 2017
- Lorenzo Cain, OF, 2011–17
- Alberto Callaspo, 2B, 3B, 2008–10
- Noah Cameron, P, 2025-Present
- Shawn Camp, P, 2004–05
- Jim Campanis, C, 1969–70
- Jim Campbell, SP, 1990
- Mark Canha, 1B/OF, 2025
- Nick Capra, OF, 1988
- José Cardenal, OF, 1980
- D. J. Carrasco, P, 2003–05
- Héctor Carrasco, P, 1997
- Jamey Carroll, 2B, 2013
- Lance Carter, P, 1999
- Mike Caruso, SS, 2B, 3B, 2002
- Larry Casian, P, 1997
- Alberto Castillo, C, 2004–05
- Manny Castillo, 3B, 2B, DH, 1980
- Max Castillo, P, 2022-2023
- Bill Castro, P, 1982–83
- **Orlando Cepeda**, DH, 1974
- Eric Cerantola, P, 2026-Present
- Jaime Cerda, P, 2004–05
- Dave Chalk, 3B, 2B, 1980–81
- Craig Chamberlain, SP, 1979–80
- Aroldis Chapman, P, 2023
- Endy Chávez, OF, 2001
- Jesse Chavez, P, 2010–11
- Bruce Chen, P, 2009–14
- Gary Christenson, P, 1979–80
- Pedro Ciriaco, IF, 2013–14
- Galen Cisco, P, 1969
- Dave Clark, OF, DH, 1991
- Terry Clark, P, 1996
- Stan Clarke, SP, 1989
- Taylor Clarke, P, 2022-2023, 2025
- Lance Clemons, P, 1971
- Chris Codiroli, P, 1990
- Tony Cogan, P, 2001
- Jim Colborn, SP, 1977–78
- Stu Cole, 2B, SS, 1991
- Dylan Coleman, P, 2021-2023
- Louis Coleman, P, 2011–15
- Vince Coleman, OF, 1994–95
- Tim Collins, P, 2011–14
- Isaac Collins, OF, 2026-Present
- Christian Colón, IF, 2014–17
- Román Colón, P, 2009–10, '12
- Onix Concepción, SS, 2B, 1980–85
- David Cone, SP, 1986, 1993–94
- Jeff Conine, OF, 1B, 1990, 1992, 1998
- Jim Converse, P, 1995, 1997
- Brent Cookson, OF, 1995
- Scott Cooper, 3B, 1B, DH, 1997
- Archie Corbin, P, 1991
- Franchy Cordero, OF, 2020
- Fernando Cortez, 2B, 2007
- Shane Costa,* OF, 2005–07
- Al Cowens,†, OF, 1974–79
- Austin Cox, P, 2023
- Jerry Cram, P, 1969, 1976
- Steve Crawford, P, 1989–91
- Keith Creel, P, 1982–83
- Dave Cripe, 3B, 1978
- Coco Crisp, OF, 2009
- Warren Cromartie, 1B, OF, 1991
- Tyler Cropley, C, 2023
- Aaron Crow, P, 2011–14
- Jose Cuas, P, 2022-23
- Juan Cruz, P, 2009–10
- Steven Cruz, P, 2023-Present
- Todd Cruz, SS, 3B, 1979
- Tony Cruz, C, 2016
- Johnny Cueto, P, 2015
- Cheslor Cuthbert, 3B, 2015–19

=== D ===
- Jeff D'Amico, P, 2000
- Bruce Dal Canton, SP, 1971–1975
- Johnny Damon, OF, 1995–2000
- Tucker Davidson, P, 2023
- Kyle Davies, SP, 2007–2011
- Butch Davis, OF, 1983–1984
- Chili Davis, DH, 1997
- John Davis, P, 1987
- Mark Davis, P, 1990–1992
- Storm Davis, P, 1990–1991
- Tommy Davis, DH, 1976
- Wade Davis, P, 2013–16, 2021
- Travis Dawkins, 2B, 2003
- Roland de la Maza, P, 1997
- Jorge de la Rosa, P, 2006–2007
- Luis de los Santos, 1B, DH, 1988–1989
- Rick DeHart, P, 2003
- David DeJesus, OF, 2003–2010
- José DeJesús, P, 1988–1989, 1994
- Paul DeJong, IF, 2024
- Wilson Delgado, 2B, SS, 3B, 2000–2001
- Chris Demaria, P, 2005
- Bucky Dent, SS, 3B, 1984
- Elmer Dessens, P, 2006
- Bob Detherage, OF, 1980
- Joselo Díaz, P, 2006
- Matt Diaz, OF, DH, 2005
- Jake Diekman, P, 2019
- Mike DiFelice, C, 2003
- Lenny DiNardo, P, 2009
- Nick Dini, C, 2019
- Frank DiPino, P, 1993
- Scott Dohmann, P, 2006
- Octavio Dotel, P, 2007
- Richard Dotson, SP, 1990
- Hunter Dozier, 3B, 2016, 2018-23
- Moe Drabowsky, P, 1969–1970
- Dick Drago, P, 1969–1973
- Brandon Duckworth, P, 2006–2008
- Tyler Duffey, P, 2024
- Danny Duffy, SP, 2011–21
- Matt Duffy, 3B, 2023
- Lucas Duda, 1B/OF, 2018-19
- Todd Dunwoody, OF, DH, 2000
- Chad Durbin, SP, 1999–2002
- Chris Dwyer, P, 2013
- Jermaine Dye, OF, 1997–2001
- Jarrod Dyson, OF, 2010–16, 2021

=== E ===
- Rawly Eastwick, P, 1980
- Craig Eaton, P, 1979
- Nate Eaton, OF, 2022-23
- Brett Eibner, OF, 2016
- Jim Eisenreich, OF, DH, 1987–92
- Scott Elarton, SP, 2006–07
- Chris Ellis, P, 2019
- Luis Encarnación, P, 1990
- Lucas Erceg, P, 2024-Present
- Alcides Escobar, SS, 2011–18
- Carlos Estévez, P, 2025-present
- Seth Etherton, SP, 2006
- Bart Evans, P, 1998

=== F ===
- Jorge Fábregas, C, 2000
- Bailey Falter, P, 2025-present
- Irving Falu, IF, 2012–2013
- Kyle Farnsworth, P, 2009–10
- Steve Farr, P, 1985–90
- Sal Fasano, C, 1996–99, 2001
- Carlos Febles, 2B, 1998–2003
- Neftalí Feliz, P, 2017
- Freddy Fermin, C, 2022-25
- Tony Ferreira, P, 1985
- Nate Field, P, 2002–05
- Josh Fields, 3B, 2010
- Heath Fillmyer, P, 2018-19
- Pete Filson, SP, 1990
- Mike Fiore, 1B, OF, 1969–70
- Al Fitzmorris, SP, 1969–76
- Dave Fleming, P, 1995
- Bobby Floyd, SS, 2B, 3B, 1970–74
- Brian Flynn, P, 2016–19
- Steve Foucault, P, 1978
- Joe Foy, 3B, OF, IF, 1969
- Jeff Francis, SP, 2011
- Maikel Franco, 3B, 2020
- Jeff Francoeur, OF, 2011–13
- Adam Frazier, 2B, 2024, 2025
- Ryan Freel, OF, 2009
- Dave Frost, SP, 1982
- Jeff Fulchino, P, 2008
- Chris Fussell, P, 1999–2000

=== G ===
- Gary Gaetti, 3B, 1B, DH, 1993–95
- Greg Gagne, SS, 1993–95
- Rich Gale, SP, 1978–81
- Cam Gallagher, C, 2017-22
- Gene Garber, P, 1973–74, 1987–88
- Danny Garcia, OF, 1B, 1981
- Maikel Garcia, SS, 2022-present
- Mark Gardner, SP, 1993
- Wes Gardner, P, 1991
- Amir Garrett, P, 2022-2023
- Joey Gathright, OF, 2006–08
- Jim Gaudet, C, 1978–79
- Sam Gaviglio, P, 2017
- Dillon Gee, P, 2016
- Tyler Gentry, OF, 2024
- Chris George, SP, 2001–04
- Esteban Germán, 2B, 3B, OF, 2006–08
- César Gerónimo, OF, 1981–83
- Byron Gettis, OF, 2004
- Chris Getz, 2B, 2010–2013
- Jeremy Giambi, DH, 1B, OF, 1998–99
- Kirk Gibson, OF, DH, 1991
- Johnny Giavotella, 2B, 2011–13
- Jason Gilfillan, P, 2003
- Jerry Don Gleaton, P, 1987–89
- Ross Gload, 1B, 2007–08
- Jimmy Gobble, P, 2003–08
- Ryan Goins, 2B, 2018
- Alexis Gómez, OF, 2002, 2004
- Fernando González, 3B, 1974
- Juan González, OF, 2004
- Brian Goodwin, OF, 2018
- Tom Goodwin, OF, 1994–97
- Alex Gordon, 3B, OF, 2007–20
- Tom Gordon, SP, 1988–95
- Terrance Gore, OF, 2014–17, 2019
- Rubén Gotay, 2B, 2004–05
- Tony Graffanino, 2B, IF, 2004–05, 2006
- Jeff Granger, P, 1993–94, 1996
- Zack Greinke, SP, 2004–10, 2022-23
- Randal Grichuk, OF, 2025
- Foster Griffin, P, 2020, 2022
- Justin Grimm, P, 2018
- Jason Grimsley, P, 2001–04
- Robbie Grossman, OF, 2024
- Jerry Grote, C, 1981
- Jeff Grotewold, DH, 1B, 1995
- Mark Grudzielanek, 2B, 2006–08
- Mark Gubicza, SP, 1984–96, RHOF (2006)
- Wilton Guerrero, IF, OF, 2004
- Aaron Guiel, OF, 1B, 2002–06
- José Guillén, RF, 2008–10
- Dave Gumpert, P, 1987
- Larry Gura, SP, 1976–85, RHOF (1992)
- Yuli Gurriel, 1B, 2024
- Jeremy Guthrie, P, 2012–15
- Juan Gutiérrez, P, 2013
- Kelvin Gutiérrez, 3B, 2019-21
- Chris Gwynn, OF, DH, 1992–93

=== H ===
- John Habyan, P, 1993
- Jesse Hahn, P, 2019-21
- Tom Hall, P, 1976–77
- Shane Halter, IF, OF, 1997–98
- Bob Hamelin, DH, 1B, 1993–96
- Billy Hamilton, OF, 2019
- Atlee Hammaker, SP, 1981
- Jason Hammel, SP, 2017–18
- Steve Hammond, OF, 1982
- Garrett Hampson, OF/2B, 2024
- Chris Haney, SP, 1992–98
- Jed Hansen, 2B, IF, OF, 1997–99
- Ron Hansen, SS, 3B, 2B, 1972
- Alan Hargesheimer, P, 1986
- Billy Harris, 2B, 1969
- Chuck Harrison, 1B, 1969, 1971
- Hunter Harvey, P, 2024-25
- Ken Harvey, 1B, DH, 2001, 2003–05
- Matt Harvey, P, 2020
- Andy Hassler, SP, 1976–78
- Thomas Hatch, P, 2025
- Chris Hatcher, OF, 1998
- Brett Hayes, C, 2013–14
- Fran Healy, C, 1969, 1973–76
- Ed Hearn, C, 1987–88
- Taylor Hearn, P, 2023
- Jonathan Heasley, P, 2021-23
- Kelly Heath, 2B, 1982
- Nick Heath, OF, 2020
- Neal Heaton, P, 1992
- Mike Hedlund, SP, 1969–72
- Bob Hegman, 2B, 1985
- Bob Heise, IF, 1977
- Dave Henderson, OF, DH, 1994
- Doug Henry, P, 2001
- Carlos Hernández, P, 2020-24
- Jackie Hernández, SS, 1969–70
- Luis Hernández, SS, 2009
- Oscar Hernández, C, 2020
- Roberto Hernández, P, 2001–02
- Runelvys Hernández, SP, 2002–03, 2005–06
- Kelvin Herrera, P, 2011–18
- Rosell Herrera, OF, 2018
- Phil Hiatt, 3B, OF, DH, 1993, 1995
- Brewer Hicklen, OF, 2022
- Jeremy Hill, P, 2002–03
- Rich Hill, P, 2025
- Tim Hill, P, 2018-19
- A. J. Hinch, C, 2001–02
- Luke Hochevar, P, 2007–16
- Dennis Hocking, 2B, 3B, SS, 2005
- Joe Hoerner, P, 1973–74
- Andrew Hoffmann, P, 2025
- Ray Holbert, SS, 2B, 3B, 1999–2000
- Greg Holland, P, 2010–15, 2020-21
- Don Hood, P, 1982–83
- Gail Hopkins, 1B, DH, 1971–73
- Eric Hosmer, 1B, 2011–17
- Tommy Hottovy, P, 2012
- Steve Hovley, OF, 1972–73
- David Howard, SS, IF, OF, 1991–97
- J.P. Howell, SP, 2005
- #10 Dick Howser, Manager, 1981–86; also played SS for the Kansas City Athletics, 1961–63; RHOF
- Al Hrabosky, P, 1978–79
- Trenidad Hubbard, OF, 2001
- Justin Huber, 1B, DH, 2005–07
- Luke Hudson, SP, 2006–07
- Dusty Hughes, P, 2009–10
- Justin Huisman, P, 2004
- Rick Huisman, P, 1995–96
- Mark Huismann, P, 1983–86
- Tug Hulett, 2B, 2009
- Philip Humber, P, 2010
- Clint Hurdle, OF, 1B, 1977–81

=== I ===
- Raúl Ibañez, OF, 1B, DH, 2001–03, 2014
- Jonathan India, OF, 2025-Present
- Omar Infante, IF 2B, 2014–16
- Dane Iorg, OF, 1B, DH, 1984–85
- Tim Ireland, IF, OF, 1981–82
- Kyle Isbel, OF, 2021-Present

=== J ===
- Bo Jackson, OF, DH, 1986–90, MSHOF
- Damian Jackson, OF, 2B, DH, 2004
- Danny Jackson, SP, 1983–87
- Grant Jackson, P, 1982
- Mike Jackson, P, 1972–73
- Mike Jacobs, 1B, 2009
- Jason Jacome, P, 1995–97
- Chris James, DH, OF, 1995
- Jon Jay, OF, 2018
- Jeremy Jeffress, P, 2011–12
- Steve Jeltz, IF, OF, 1990
- Carter Jensen, C, 2025-present
- Ryan Jensen, P, 2005
- Bob Johnson, SP, 1970
- Brian Johnson, C, 2000
- Elliot Johnson, 2B, OF, 2013
- Ron Johnson, 1B, C, 1982–83
- Rondin Johnson, 2B, 1986
- Rontrez Johnson, OF, 2003
- Joel Johnston, P, 1991–92
- Lynn Jones, OF, 1984–86
- Mike Jones, P, 1980–81, 1984–85
- Ross Jones, SS, 2B, 1987
- Ruppert Jones, OF, 1976
- Steve Jones, P, 1969
- Félix José, OF, 1993–95
- Donnie Joseph, P, 2013–14
- Wally Joyner, 1B, 1992–95
- Jake Junis, P, 2017–21

=== K ===
- Kila Ka'aihue, 1B, 2008, 2010–11
- Nate Karns, P, 2017
- Greg Keatley, C, 1981
- Brad Keller, P, 2018-23
- Pat Kelly, OF, 1969–70
- Jason Kendall, C, 2010
- Ian Kennedy, P, 2016–20
- Joe Keough, OF, 1B, 1969–72
- Bobby Keppel, SP, 2006
- Jeff Keppinger, IF, OF, 2006
- **Harmon Killebrew**, DH, 1B, 1975
- Jeff King, 1B, DH, 1997–99
- Mike Kingery, OF, 1986
- Matt Kinney, P, 2004
- Ed Kirkpatrick, C, OF, 1B, 1969–73
- Will Klein, P, 2024
- Chuck Knoblauch, OF, 2002
- Bobby Knoop, 2B, 3B, 1971–72
- Stephen Kolek, P, 2025-present
- Kevin Koslofski, OF, 1992–94
- George Kottaras, C, 2013
- Jackson Kowar, P, 2021-23
- Chad Kreuter, C, 1999
- Brooks Kriske, P, 2023
- Art Kusnyer, C, 1978

=== L ===
- Pete LaCock, 1B, OF, DH, 1977–80
- Mike LaCoss, P, 1985
- Joe Lahoud, OF, DH, 1977–78
- Gary Lance, P, 1977
- Alex Lange, P, 2026-Present
- Andy Larkin, P, 2000
- Jason LaRue, C, 2007
- Rudy Law, OF, 1986
- Brett Laxton, P, 2000
- Terry Leach, P, 1989
- Mark Lee, P, 1988
- Dave Leeper, OF, 1984–85
- Charlie Leibrandt, SP, 1984–89
- Scott Leius, IF, DH, 1998–99
- Patrick Lennon, OF, 1996
- Dennis Leonard, SP, 1974–83, 1985–86, RHOF (1989), MSHOF
- Anthony Lerew, P, 2009–10
- Curt Leskanic, P, 2003–04
- Al Levine, P, 2003
- José Lima, SP, 2003, 2005
- José Lind, 2B, 1993–95
- Doug Linton, SP, 1995–96
- Nelson Liriano, 2B, 1991
- Mark Littell, P, 1973, 1975–77
- Ben Lively, P, 2018-19
- Graeme Lloyd, P, 2003
- Keith Lockhart, 2B, 3B, DH, 1995–96
- Nick Loftin, UT, 2023-Present
- Ryan Long, OF, 1997
- Sam Long, P, 2024-25
- Terrence Long, OF, 2005
- Albie Lopez, P, 2003
- Aurelio López, P, 1974
- Jorge López, P, 2018-20
- Mendy López, IF, OF, 1998–99, 2003–04
- Nicky Lopez, IF, 2019-23
- Michael Lorenzen, P, 2024-25
- David Lough, OF, 2012–2013
- Richard Lovelady, P, 2019-21
- Sean Lowe, P, 2003
- Devon Lowery, P, 2008
- Rick Luecken, P, 1989
- Seth Lugo, P, 2024-present
- Jordan Lyles, P, 2023-24
- Daniel Lynch IV, P, 2021-Present

=== M ===
- Mike MacDougal, P, 2001–06
- Mike Macfarlane, C, 1987–94, 1996–98
- Shane Mack, OF, DH, 1998
- Scotti Madison, C, 1B, OF, DH, 1987–88
- Mike Magnante, P, 1991–96
- Ron Mahay, P, 2008–09
- Mitch Maier, OF, 2006–12
- Luke Maile, C, 2025
- Carlos Maldonado, P, 1990–91
- Martín Maldonado, C, 2019
- Eli Marrero, OF, 1B, 2005
- Alec Marsh, P, 2023-24
- Keith Marshall, OF, 1973
- Víctor Marté, P, 2009–10
- Starling Marte, OF, 2026-Present
- Jerry Martin, OF, 1982–83
- Renie Martin, P, 1979–81
- Buck Martinez, C, 1969–71, 1973–77
- Carmelo Martínez, 1B, 1991
- Felix Martinez, SS, 2B, 1997–99
- Gary Martz, OF, 1975
- Michael Massey, 2B, 2022-Present
- Tom Matchick, SS, 2B, 1970
- Rubén Mateo, OF, 2004
- Terry Mathews, P, 1999
- Julius Matos, 3B, 2B, SS, 2003
- Brandon Maurer, P, 2017–18
- Justin Maxwell, OF, 2013–14
- Darrell May, SP, 2002–04
- Jerry May, C, 1971–73
- Lee May, 1B, DH, 1981–82
- Lucas May, C, 2010
- John Mayberry, 1B, DH, 1972–1977, RHOF (1996)
- Mike Mayers, P, 2023
- Brent Mayne, C, 1990–95, 2001–03
- Joe Mays, SP, 2006
- Vin Mazzaro, SP, 2011–12
- James McArthur, P, 2023-24
- Ryan McBroom, 1B, OF, 2019-21
- Kevin McCarthy, P, 2016–20
- David McCarty, 1B, OF, DH, 2000–02
- Bob McClure, P, 1975–76
- Mike McCormick, P, 1971
- Lindy McDaniel, P, 1974–75
- Allen McDill, P, 1997–98
- Donzell McDonald, OF, 2002
- Joe McEwing, IF, OF, DH, 2005
- Andy McGaffigan, P, 1990–91
- Randy McGilberry, P, 1977–78
- Russ McGinnis, 1B, 3B, OF, 1995
- John McMillon, P, 2023
- Brian McRae, OF, 1990–94
- Hal McRae, DH, OF, 1973–87; Manager, 1991–94; RHOF (1989), MSHOF
- Kevin McReynolds, OF, 1992–93
- Larry McWilliams, P, 1989–90
- Rusty Meacham, P, 1992–95
- Brian Meadows, SP, 2000–01
- Gil Meche, P, 2007–10
- Kris Medlen, P, 2015–16
- Erick Mejia, OF, 2019-20
- MJ Melendez, C, OF, 2022-25
- Bob Melvin, C, 1B, 1992
- Luis Mendoza, P, 2010–13
- Daniel Mengden, P, 2022
- Henry Mercedes, C, 1995–96
- Whit Merrifield, 2B, OF, 2016–22
- Doug Mientkiewicz, 1B, 2006
- José Mijares, P, 2012
- Bob Milacki, SP, 1994
- Jai Miller, OF, 2010
- Keith Miller, 2B, 3B, OF, 1992–95
- Alec Mills, P, 2016
- Wyatt Mills, P, 2022
- Steve Mingori, P, 1973–79
- Mike Minor, P, 2017, 2021
- Anthony Misiewicz, P, 2022
- Dennis Moeller, SP, 1992
- Raúl A. Mondesí, 2B, 2015–19
- Aurelio Monteagudo, P, 1970
- Jeff Montgomery, P, 1988–99 RHOF (2003)
- Mike Montgomery, P, 2019-20
- Monty Montgomery, SP, 1971–72
- Adam Moore, C, 2012–13
- Bobby Moore, OF, 1991
- Kendrys Morales, DH, 2015–16
- Dave Morehead, P, 1969–70
- Omar Moreno, OF, 1985
- Orber Moreno, P, 1999
- Alvin Morman, P, 1999
- Russ Morman, 1B, OF, DH, 1990–91
- Hal Morris, 1B, OF, DH, 1998
- Brandon Moss, 1B, OF, DH, 2017–
- José Mota, 2B, 1995
- Darryl Motley, OF, 1981, 1983–86
- Mike Moustakas, 3B, 2011–19
- Peter Moylan, P, 2016
- Scott Mullen, P, 2000–03
- Rance Mulliniks, SS, 2B, 3B, 1980–81
- Donnie Murphy, 2B, SS, 2004–05
- Tom Murphy, P, 1972
- Dan Murray, P, 1999–2000
- Neal Musser, P, 2007–08
- Rod Myers, OF, 1996–97

=== N ===
- Daniel Nava, OF, 2016
- Yamaico Navarro, 3B, 2011
- Dave Nelson, 2B, DH, 1976–77
- Joe Nelson, P, 2006
- Roger Nelson, SP, 1969–72
- Jim Nettles, OF, 1979
- Jake Newberry, P, 2018-21
- Josh Newman, P, 2008
- Hideo Nomo, P, 2008
- Les Norman, OF, DH, 1995–96
- Scott Northey, OF, 1969
- Abraham Núñez, OF, 2004
- Jon Nunnally, OF, 1995–97

=== O ===
- Ryan O'Hearn, 1B, OF, 2018-22
- Don O'Riley, P, 1969–70
- Sean O'Sullivan, SP, 2010–11
- Trevor Oaks, P, 2018
- Wes Obermueller, SP, 2002
- Jake Odorizzi, P, 2012
- José Offerman, 2B, 1B, SS, 1996–98
- Edward Olivares, OF, 2020-23
- Bob Oliver, 1B, 3B, OF 1969–72
- Miguel Olivo, C, 2008–09
- Gregg Olson, P, 1995
- Luis Ordaz, 2B, SS, 3B, 2000–02
- Paulo Orlando, OF, 2015–18
- Jorge Orta, DH, OF, 1984–87
- Frank Ortenzio, 1B, 1973
- Héctor Ortiz, C, 1998, 2000–01
- Amos Otis, CF, 1970–83, RHOF (1986)
- Juan Carlos Oviedo, P, 2005–08
- Dave Owen, SS, 1988
- Larry Owen, C, 1987–88
- Chris Owings, SS, 2019

=== P ===
- Dennis Paepke, C, OF, 1969, 1971–72, 1974
- Rey Palacios, C, 3B, 1B, 1988–90
- Dean Palmer, 3B, 1987–88
- Felipe Paulino, SP, 2011–12
- Craig Paquette, 3B, OF, 1B, SS, 1996–97
- John Parrish, P, 2010
- Bill Paschall, P, 1978–79, 1981
- Vinnie Pasquantino, IF, 2022-present
- Cliff Pastornicky, 3B, 1983
- Fred Patek, SS, 1971–79, RHOF (1992), MSHOF
- Jarrod Patterson, 3B, 1B, DH, 2003
- Marty Pattin, P, 1974–80
- Felipe Paulino, P, 2011-12
- Joel Payamps, P, 2021-22
- Bill Pecota, IF, OF, 1986–91
- Jorge Pedre, C, 1B, 1991
- Kit Pellow, 3B, 1B, DH, 2002
- Brayan Peña, C, 2009–12
- Carlos Peña, 1B, 2013
- Tony Peña Jr., SS, 2007–09
- Terry Pendleton, DH, 3B, 1998
- Walter Pennington, P, 2024
- Joel Peralta, P, 2006–08
- Wily Peralta, P, 2018-19
- Mélido Pérez, SP, 1987
- Mike Pérez, P, 1997
- Neifi Pérez, SS, 2001–02
- Odalis Pérez, SP, 2006–07
- Richard Perez, 2B, 1987
- Salvador Pérez, C, 2011–present
- Chan Perry, 1B, 2002
- **Gaylord Perry**, SP, 1983 (14 games, his last season), MSHOF
- Gerald Perry, DH, 1B, 1990
- Mark Persico, C, 3B, 1989
- Tommy Pham, IF, 2024
- Ken Phelps, DH, 1B, 1980–81
- Brett Phillips, OF, 2018-20
- Paul Phillips, C, 1B, 2004–06
- Hipólito Pichardo, P, 1992–98
- Calvin Pickering, DH, 1B, 2004–05
- Ed Pierce, P, 1992
- Manny Piña, C, 2011–12
- Lou Piniella, OF, 1969–73
- Vada Pinson, OF, 1974–75
- Marc Pisciotta, P, 1999
- Jim Pittsley, P, 1995, 1997–99
- Scott Podsednik, OF, 2010
- Sidney Ponson, P, 2009
- Tom Poquette, OF, 1973, 1976–79, 1982
- Darrell Porter, C, DH, 1977–80
- Logan Porter, C, 2023
- Scott Pose, OF, DH, 1999–2000
- Brooks Pounders, P, 2016-2017
- Ted Power, P, 1988
- Nick Pratto, 1B, 2022-24
- Tom Prince, C, 2003
- Greg Pryor, IF, 1982–86
- Tim Pugh, P, 1996
- Terry Puhl, OF, DH, 1991
- Luis Pujols, C, 1984
- Harvey Pulliam, OF, 1991–93

=== Q ===
- Mark Quinn, OF, DH, 1999–2002
- Humberto Quintero, C, 2012
- Jamie Quirk, C, IF, OF, 1975–76, 1978–82, 1985–88
- Dan Quisenberry, P, 1979–88, RHOF (1998), MSHOF

=== R ===
- Cole Ragans, P, 2023-present
- Jason Rakers, P, 2000
- Horacio Ramírez, P, 2008–09
- Ramón Ramírez, P, 2008
- Joe Randa, 3B, 1995–96, 1999–2004
- Pat Rapp, SP, 1998
- Dennis Rasmussen, P, 1992–93, 1995
- Eric Rasmussen, SP, 1983
- John Rave, OF, 2025-Present
- Ken Ray, P, 1999
- Barry Raziano, P, 1973
- Jeff Reboulet, 2B, 3B, SS, 2000
- Mark Redman, SP, 2006
- Rick Reed, SP, 1992–93
- Rick Reichardt, DH, OF, 1973–74
- Dan Reichert, P, 1999–2002
- Bryan Rekar, P, 2002
- Desi Relaford, IF, OF, 2003–04
- Hunter Renfroe, OF, 2024-25
- Steve Renko, SP, 1983
- Dennys Reyes, P, 2004
- Franmil Reyes, OF, 2023
- Matt Reynolds, SS, 2020
- Trevor Richards, P, 2025
- Fred Rico, OF, 1969
- Brad Rigby, P, 1999–2000
- Danny Rios, P, 1998
- Juan Ríos, 2B, SS, 1969
- David Riske, P, 2007
- Bombo Rivera, OF, 1982
- Emmanuel Rivera, 3B, 2021-22
- Luis Rivera, SS, 2B, 3B, 1998
- Sebastian Rivero, C, 2021-22
- Bip Roberts, OF, 2B, 3B, 1996–97
- Leon Roberts, OF, 1983–84
- Clint Robinson, PH, 2012
- Kenny Robinson,†, P, 1996
- Kerry Robinson, OF, 2006
- Eduardo Rodríguez, P, 1979
- Ellie Rodríguez, C, 1969–70
- Cookie Rojas, 2B, 1970–77; RHOF (1987)
- Enny Romero, P, 2018
- Brent Rooker, OF, 2022
- Jim Rooker, SP, 1969–72
- Carlos Rosa, RP, 2008–09
- José Rosado, SP, 1996–2000
- Randy Rosario, P, 2019-20
- Trevor Rosenthal, P, 2020
- Rico Rossy, SS, 2B, 3B, 1992–93
- Josh Rupe, P, 2010
- Glendon Rusch, SP, 1997–99
- Mark Ryal, OF, 1982

=== S ===
- Bret Saberhagen, SP, 1984–91, RHOF (2005)
- Ray Sadecki, P, 1975–76
- Donnie Sadler, IF, OF, 2001–02
- Ángel Salazar, SS, 1986–87
- Bill Sampen, P, 1992–93
- Juan Samuel, OF, 2B, 1992, 1995
- Ángel Sánchez, 2B, SS, 2006
- Jonathan Sánchez, P, 2012
- Israel Sánchez, P, 1988, 1990
- Orlando Sánchez, C, 1984
- Rey Sánchez, SS, 1999–2001
- Ken Sanders, P, 1976
- Reggie Sanders, OF, 2006–07
- Carlos Santana, 1B, DH, 2021-22
- Ervin Santana, P, 2013, 2021
- Benito Santiago, C, 2004
- José Santiago, P, 1997–2001
- Nelson Santovenia, C, 1993
- Matt Sauer, P, 2024
- Rich Sauveur, P, 1992
- Ted Savage, OF, 1971
- Bob Scanlan, P, 1996
- Steve Scarsone, IF, 1999
- Paul Schaal, 3B, 1969–74
- Jeff Schattinger, P, 1981
- Dan Schatzeder, P, 1991
- Richie Scheinblum, 1972, 1974
- John Schreiber, P, 2024-Present
- Jeff Schulz, OF, 1989–90
- Frank Schwindel, 1B, 2019
- George Scott, 1B, 1979
- Rodney Scott, 2B, SS, 1975
- Jim Scranton, SS, 3B, 1984–85
- Rudy Seánez, P, 2004
- Shawn Sedlacek, SP, 2002
- Kevin Seitzer, 3B, 1B, 1986–91
- Colin Selby, P, 2024
- Jimmy Serrano, P, 2004
- Scott Service, P, 1997–99
- Rich Severson, SS, 2B, 1970–71
- Ryan Shealy, 1B, 2006–08
- Pat Sheridan, OF, 1981, 1983–85
- James Shields, P, 2013–2014
- Steve Shields, P, 1986
- Steve Shifflett, P, 1992
- Bob Shirley, P, 1987
- Brian Shouse, P, 2002
- Terry Shumpert, 2B, 3B, 1990–94
- Luis Silverio, OF, 1978
- Joe Simpson, 1B, OF, 1983
- Wayne Simpson, P, 1973
- Brady Singer, P, 2020-24
- Andrew Sisco, P, 2005–06
- Evan Sisk, P, 2025
- Eric Skoglund, P, 2017–19
- Don Slaught, C, 1982–84
- Burch Smith, P, 2018
- Daryl Smith, P, 1990
- Jason Smith, IF, 2007–08
- Lonnie Smith, OF, 1985–87
- Will Smith, P, 2012–2013, 2024
- Collin Snider, P, 2022-23
- Kyle Snyder, P, 2003, 2005–06
- Tony Solaita,†, 1B, DH, 1974–76
- Jorge Soler, OF, 2017–21
- Joakim Soria, P, 2007–11, 2016
- Billy Sorrell, 3B, OF, 1B, 1970
- Glenn Sparkman, P, 2018-20
- Tim Spehr, C, 1991, 1997, 1998–99
- Gabe Speier, P, 2019-22
- Paul Splittorff, SP, 1970–84, MSHOF
- Paul Spoljaric, P, 2000
- Jerry Spradlin, P, 2000
- George Spriggs, OF, 1969–70
- Matt Stairs, 1B, DH, OF, 2004–06
- Jason Standridge, P, 2007
- Bubba Starling, OF, 2019-20
- Josh Staumont, P, 2019-23
- Blake Stein, P, 1999–2002
- Steve Stemle, P, 2005–06
- Andy Stewart, C, 1997
- Kurt Stillwell, SS, 1988–91
- Kelly Stinnett, C, 2004
- Bob Stinson, C, 1975–76
- Bob Stoddard, P, 1987
- Mel Stottlemyre Jr., P, 1990
- Eric Stout, P, 2018
- Matt Strahm, P, 2016–17
- Chris Stratton, P, 2024-25
- Chris Stynes, 2B, OF, 1995–96
- Scott Sullivan, P, 2004
- Jim Sundberg, C, 1985–86
- Jeff Suppan, SP, 1999–2002
- Larry Sutton, OF, 1B, 1997–98
- Mac Suzuki, P, 1999–2001, 2002
- Anthony Swarzak, P, 2021
- Mike Sweeney, 1B, DH, C, 1995–2007

=== T ===
- Pat Tabler, OF, 1B, DH, 1989–1990
- Danny Tartabull, OF, 1987–91
- Carl Taylor, C, OF, 1B, 1971–73
- Dwight Taylor, OF, 1986
- Hawk Taylor, OF, C, PH, 1969–70
- Josh Taylor, P, 2023
- Michael A. Taylor, OF, 2021-22
- Samad Taylor, 2B, 2023
- Everett Teaford, P, 2011–13
- Mark Teahen, 3B, OF, 1B 2005–09
- Miguel Tejada, 2B, 2013
- Robinson Tejeda, P, 2008–11
- Jerry Terrell, IF, OF, P, 1978–1980
- Kanekoa Texeira, P, 2010–11
- Lane Thomas, OF, 2026-Present
- Brad Thompson, P, 2010
- Rich Thompson, OF, 2004
- John Thomson, P, 2007
- George Throop, P, 1975, 1977–79
- Gary Thurman, OF, 1987–92
- Tyler Tolbert, IF/OF, 2025-Present
- Brett Tomko, P, 2008
- Mike Tonis, C, 2004
- Dilson Torres, P, 1995
- Ramón Torres, IF, 2017-18
- Rusty Torres, OF, 1980
- Matt Treanor, C, 2011
- Michael Tucker, OF, 1995–96, 2002–03
- Bob Tufts, P, 1982–83
- Matt Tupman, C, 2008
- Chris Turner, C, 1998
- Jeff Twitty, P, 1980

=== V ===
- Sandy Valdespino, OF, 1971
- Julio Valera, P, 1996
- Jason Vargas, P, 2014–2017
- Jorge Vásquez, P, 2004
- Jerry Vasto, P, 2018
- Nelson Velázquez, OF, 2023-24
- Anthony Veneziano, P, 2023-24
- Yordano Ventura, P, 2013–16
- Ryan Verdugo, P, 2012
- Randy Veres, P, 1997
- Eduardo Villacis, P, 2004
- Meibrys Viloria, C, 2018-20
- Joe Vitiello, 1B, OF, 1995–99
- Arodys Vizcaino, P, 2022
- Edinson Vólquez, P, 2015–16
- Brad Voyles, P, 2001–03

=== W ===
- Michael Wacha, P, 2024-present
- Doug Waechter, P, 2009
- Héctor Wagner, SP, 1990–91
- Jamie Walker, P, 1997–98
- Derek Wallace, P, 1999
- Les Walrond, P, 2003
- Chien-Ming Wang, P, 2016
- U.L. Washington, SS, 1977–84
- Drew Waters, OF, 2022-Present
- Dusty Wathan, C, 2002
- John Wathan, C, 1B, OF, 1976–85; Manager, 1987–1991
- Luke Weaver, P, 2022
- Jim Webb, P,1970–1971
- Todd Wellemeyer, P, 2006–07
- Brad Wellman, 2B, SS, 3B, 1988–89
- Kip Wells, P, 2008
- Don Wengert, P, 1999
- Dennis Werth, C, 1B, 1982
- Matt Whisenant, P, 1997–99
- #20 Frank White, 2B, 1973–90, RHOF, MSHOF
- Rondell White, OF, 2003
- Dave Wickersham, P, 1969
- Curtis Wilkerson, 2B, SS, 3B, 1992–93
- Mike Williams, P, 1997
- Mitch Williams, P, 1997
- Frank Wills, P, 1983–84
- Craig Wilson, 3B, 1993
- Kris Wilson, P, 2000–03
- Willie Wilson, CF, 1976–90, RHOF (2000), MSHOF
- Matt Winters, OF, 1989
- Jay Witasick, SP, 1999–2000
- Bobby Witt Jr., IF, 2022-Present
- Nick Wittgren, P, 2023
- Jim Wohlford, OF, 1972–76
- Blake Wood, P, 2010–11
- Mike Wood, P, 2004–06
- Travis Wood, P, 2017
- Jamey Wright, SP, 2003, 2009
- Jim Wright, P, 1981–82
- Ken Wright, P, 1970–73

=== Y ===
- Yasuhiko Yabuta, P, 2008–09
- Ryan Yarbrough, P, 2023
- Mike Yastrzemski, OF, 2025
- Jim York, P, 1970–71
- Chris Young, P, 2015–17
- Curt Young, P, 1992
- Ernie Young, OF, 1998
- Kevin Young, 1B, 3B, OF, 1996

=== Z ===
- Chris Zachary, P, 1969
- Gregg Zaun, C, 2000–01
- Joe Zdeb, OF, 1977–79
- Ángel Zerpa, P, 2021-25
- Kyle Zimmer, P, 2019-21
- Ben Zobrist, 2B, 2015
- Tyler Zuber, P, 2020-21
- Paul Zuvella, 3B, 1991

== See also ==
- Major League Baseball rosters
- Kansas City Royals
- Kansas City Royals award winners and league leaders
- Kansas City Royals records – statistical records and milestone achievements
