= 2004 Kansas City Royals season =

2004 Kansas City Royals
- League: American League
- Division: Central
- Ballpark: Kauffman Stadium
- City: Kansas City, Missouri
- Record: 58–104 (.358)
- Divisional place: 5th
- Owners: David Glass
- General managers: Allard Baird
- Managers: Tony Peña
- Television: KMCI; Royals Sports Television Network (Ryan Lefebvre, Paul Splittorff, Denny Matthews, Bob Davis)
- Radio: WHB; KLRX (Denny Matthews, Ryan Lefebvre, Fred White, Paul Splittorff, Bob Davis)

The 2004 Kansas City Royals season was the 36th season for the franchise, and their 32nd at Kauffman Stadium. It involved the Royals finishing fifth in the American League Central with a record of 58 wins and 104 losses. It was one of the most disappointing seasons in Royals' history. The team had been picked by many sporting magazines to win the AL Central following their third-place finish in 2003. However, injuries of veteran acquisitions did the Royals in. Catcher Benito Santiago and outfielder Juan González both played very few games for the boys in blue. Mike Sweeney was also injured during the campaign. As a result, the Royals set a new record for most losses in franchise history.

== Offseason ==
- January 6, 2004: Juan González signed as a free agent with the Kansas City Royals.
- January 16, 2004: Doug Linton was signed as a free agent with the Kansas City Royals.

== Regular season ==
=== Season standings ===
AL Central
Team	W	L	Pct.	GB	Home	Road
Minnesota Twins	92	70	.568	—	49‍–‍32	43‍–‍38
Chicago White Sox	83	79	.512	9	46‍–‍35	37‍–‍44
Cleveland Indians	80	82	.494	12	44‍–‍37	36‍–‍45
Detroit Tigers	72	90	.444	20	38‍–‍43	34‍–‍47
Kansas City Royals	58	104	.358	34	33‍–‍47	25‍–‍57

=== Record vs. opponents ===
2004 American League record Source: MLB Standings Grid – 2004
Team	ANA	BAL	BOS	CWS	CLE	DET	KC	MIN	NYY	OAK	SEA	TB	TEX	TOR	NL
Anaheim	—	6–3	4–5	5–4	4–5	7–2	7–0	5–4	5–4	10–9	13–7	6–1	9–10	4–5	7–11
Baltimore	3–6	—	10–9	2–4	3–3	6–0	6–3	4–5	5–14	0–7	7–2	11–8	5–2	11–8	5–13
Boston	5–4	9–10	—	4–2	3–4	6–1	4–2	2–4	11–8	8–1	5–4	14–5	4–5	14–5	9–9
Chicago	4–5	4–2	2–4	—	10–9	8–11	13–6	9–10	3–4	2–7	7–2	4–2	6–3	3–4	8–10
Cleveland	5–4	3–3	4–3	9–10	—	9–10	11–8	7–12	2–4	6–3	5–4	3–3	1–8	5–2	10–8
Detroit	2–7	0–6	1–6	11–8	10–9	—	8–11	7–12	4–3	4–5	5–4	3–3	4–5	4–2	9–9
Kansas City	0–7	3–6	2–4	6–13	8–11	11–8	—	7–12	1–5	2–7	2–5	3–6	4–5	3–3	6–12
Minnesota	4–5	5–4	4–2	10–9	12–7	12–7	12–7	—	2–4	2–5	5–4	4–5	5–2	4–2	11–7
New York	4–5	14–5	8–11	4–3	4–2	3–4	5–1	4–2	—	7–2	6–3	15–4	5–4	12–7	10–8
Oakland	9–10	7–0	1–8	7–2	3–6	5–4	7–2	5–2	2–7	—	11–8	7–2	11–9	6–3	10–8
Seattle	7–13	2–7	4–5	2–7	4–5	4–5	5–2	4–5	3–6	8–11	—	2–5	7–12	2–7	9–9
Tampa Bay	1–6	8–11	5–14	2–4	3–3	3–3	6–3	5–4	4–15	2–7	5–2	—	2–7	9–9	15–3
Texas	10–9	2–5	5–4	3–6	8–1	5–4	5–4	2–5	4–5	9–11	12–7	7–2	—	7–2	10–8
Toronto	5–4	8–11	5–14	4–3	2–5	2–4	3–3	2–4	7–12	3–6	7–2	9–9	2–7	—	8–10

=== Transactions ===
- July 30, 2004: Justin Huber was traded by the New York Mets to the Kansas City Royals for José Bautista.

=== Roster ===
2004 Kansas City Royals
Roster
Pitchers: 48 Jeremy Affeldt; 19 Brian Anderson; 55 Kevin Appier; 27 Denny Bautista; 35 Ryan Bukvich; 58 Shawn Camp; 21 D. J. Carrasco; 56 Jaime Cerda; 57 Nate Field; 32 Chris George; 41 Jimmy Gobble; 23 Zack Greinke; 38 Jason Grimsley; 37 Justin Huisman; 52 Matt Kinney; 54 Mike MacDougal; 34 Darrell May; 49 Dennys Reyes; 43 Rudy Seánez; 50 Jimmy Serrano; 47 Scott Sullivan; 59 Jorge Vásquez; 59 Eduardo Villacis; 46 Mike Wood	Catchers: 2 John Buck; 7 Alberto Castillo; 3 Paul Phillips; 30,33 Benito Santiago; 18 Kelly Stinnett; 3 Mike Tonis; Infielders: 27 José Bautista; 4 Ángel Berroa; 1,3 Andrés Blanco; 30 Rubén Gotay; 14 Tony Graffanino; 1 Wilton Guerrero; 28 Ken Harvey; 7 Mendy López; 31 Donnie Murphy; 36 Calvin Pickering; 16 Joe Randa; 12,11 Desi Relaford; 29 Mike Sweeney	Outfielders: 15 Carlos Beltrán; 24 Brandon Berger; 31 Adrian Brown; 8 Dee Brown; 9 David DeJesus; 31 Byron Gettis; 43 Alexis Gómez; 22 Juan González; 45 Aaron Guiel; 1 Damian Jackson; 24 Rubén Mateo; 38 Abraham Núñez; 11,12 Matt Stairs; 24 Rich Thompson	Manager: 6 Tony Peña; Coaches: 52 John Cumberland (pitching); 13 John Mizerock (third base); 26 Jeff Pentland (hitting); 25 Brian Poldberg (bullpen); 44 Bob Schaefer (bench); 17 Luis Silverio (first base)

== Player stats ==
=== Batting ===
==== Starters by position ====
Note: Pos = Position; G = Games played; AB = At bats; H = Hits; Avg. = Batting average; HR = Home runs; RBI = Runs batted in

Pos	Player	G	AB	H	Avg.	HR	RBI
C	John Buck	71	238	56	.235	12	30
1B	Ken Harvey	120	456	131	.287	13	55
2B	Tony Graffanino	75	278	73	.263	3	26
SS	Ángel Berroa	134	512	134	.262	8	43
3B	Joe Randa	128	485	139	.287	8	56
LF	Dee Brown	59	195	49	.251	4	24
CF	David DeJesus	96	363	104	.287	7	39
RF	Abraham Núñez	59	221	50	.226	5	29
DH	Mike Sweeney	106	411	118	.287	22	79

==== Other batters ====
Note: G = Games played; AB = At bats; H = Hits; Avg. = Batting average; HR = Home runs; RBI = Runs batted in

Player	G	AB	H	Avg.	HR	RBI
Matt Stairs	126	439	117	.267	18	66
Desi Relaford	114	380	84	.221	6	34
Carlos Beltrán	69	266	74	.278	15	51
Benito Santiago	49	175	48	.274	6	23
Ruben Gotay	44	152	41	.270	1	16
Aaron Guiel	42	135	21	.156	5	13
Juan González	33	127	35	.276	5	17
Calvin Pickering	35	122	30	.246	7	26
Ruben Mateo	32	93	18	.194	0	7
Alberto Castillo	29	89	24	.270	1	11
Andrés Blanco	19	60	19	.317	0	5
Kelly Stinnett	20	59	18	.305	3	7
Byron Gettis	21	39	7	.179	0	1
Mendy López	18	38	4	.105	1	4
Brandon Berger	11	35	7	.200	0	2
Wilton Guerrero	24	32	7	.219	0	1
Alexis Gómez	13	29	8	.276	0	4
Donnie Murphy	7	27	5	.185	0	3
José Bautista	13	25	5	.200	0	1
Damian Jackson	14	15	2	.133	0	2
Adrian Brown	5	11	3	.273	0	0
Mike Tonis	2	6	0	.000	0	0
Paul Phillips	4	5	1	.200	0	0
Rich Thompson	6	1	0	.000	0	0

=== Pitching ===
==== Starting pitchers ====
Note: G = Games pitched; IP = Innings pitched; W = Wins; L = Losses; ERA = Earned run average; SO = Strikeouts

Player	G	IP	W	L	ERA	SO
Darrell May	31	186.0	9	19	5.61	120
Brian Anderson	35	166.0	6	12	5.64	70
Jimmy Gobble	25	148.0	9	8	5.35	49
Zack Greinke	24	145.0	8	11	3.97	100
Mike Wood	17	100.0	3	8	5.94	54
Denny Bautista	5	27.2	0	4	6.51	18
Kevin Appier	2	4.0	0	1	13.50	2
Eduardo Villacis	1	3.1	0	1	13.50	0

==== Other pitchers ====
Note: G = Games pitched; IP = Innings pitched; W = Wins; L = Losses; ERA = Earned run average; SO = Strikeouts

Player	G	IP	W	L	ERA	SO
Dennys Reyes	40	108.0	4	8	4.75	91
Jeremy Affeldt	38	76.1	3	4	4.95	49
Chris George	10	42.1	1	2	7.23	15
Jimmy Serrano	10	32.2	1	2	4.68	25

==== Relief pitchers ====
Note: G = Games pitched; W = Wins; L = Losses; SV = Saves; ERA = Earned run average; SO = Strikeouts

Player	G	W	L	SV	ERA	SO
Jaime Cerda	53	1	4	2	3.15	33
Scott Sullivan	49	3	4	0	4.77	45
Nate Field	43	2	3	3	4.26	30
Shawn Camp	42	2	2	2	3.92	51
Jason Grimsley	32	3	3	0	3.38	18
D.J. Carrasco	30	2	2	0	4.84	22
Curt Leskanic	19	0	3	2	8.04	15
Rudy Seánez	16	0	1	0	3.91	21
Justin Huisman	14	0	0	1	6.84	13
Mike MacDougal	13	1	1	1	5.56	14
Matt Kinney	11	0	1	0	7.16	21
Ryan Bukvich	9	0	0	1	3.68	7
Jorge Vásquez	2	0	0	0	8.10	4

== Farm system ==
Level	Team	League	Manager
AAA	Omaha Royals	Pacific Coast League	Mike Jirschele
AA	Wichita Wranglers	Texas League	Frank White
A	Wilmington Blue Rocks	Carolina League	Billy Gardner Jr.
A	Burlington Bees	Midwest League	Jim Gabella
Rookie	AZL Royals	Arizona League	Lloyd Simmons
Rookie	Idaho Falls Chukars	Pioneer League	Brian Rupp
