= 2005 Kansas City Royals season =

2005 Kansas City Royals
- League: American League
- Division: Central
- Ballpark: Kauffman Stadium
- City: Kansas City, Missouri
- Record: 56–106 (.346)
- Divisional place: 5th
- Owners: David Glass
- General managers: Allard Baird
- Managers: Tony Peña, Bob Schaefer, Buddy Bell
- Television: KMCI; Royals Sports Television Network (Ryan Lefebvre, Paul Splittorff, Denny Matthews, Bob Davis)
- Radio: WHB; KLRX (Denny Matthews, Ryan Lefebvre, Fred White)

The 2005 Kansas City Royals season was the 37th season for the franchise, and their 33rd at Kauffman Stadium. The Royals competed in the American League Central, where they finished fifth with a record of 56 wins and 106 losses, 43 games behind the first-place Chicago White Sox, who won the 2005 World Series as well. With 106 losses, the Royals set a record for the most losses in a single season in franchise history, and their third 100-loss season in four years. The 2005 Kansas City Royals suffered from poor pitching and an anemic offense, and to date have one of the worst Major League Baseball season records of all time. On August 31, the Royals became the first team to be eliminated from playoff contention.

== Offseason ==
- January 21, 2005: Denny Hocking was signed as a free agent with the Kansas City Royals.

== Regular season ==
=== Season standings ===
AL Central
Team	W	L	Pct.	GB	Home	Road
Chicago White Sox	99	63	.611	—	47‍–‍34	52‍–‍29
Cleveland Indians	93	69	.574	6	43‍–‍38	50‍–‍31
Minnesota Twins	83	79	.512	16	45‍–‍36	38‍–‍43
Detroit Tigers	71	91	.438	28	39‍–‍42	32‍–‍49
Kansas City Royals	56	106	.346	43	34‍–‍47	22‍–‍59

=== Record vs. opponents ===
2005 American League record Source: MLB Standings Grid – 2005
Team	BAL	BOS	CWS	CLE	DET	KC	LAA	MIN	NYY	OAK	SEA	TB	TEX	TOR	NL
Baltimore	—	8–10	2–6	1–6	3–5	4–2	2–4	3–3	7–11	4–6	7–3	12–6	4–6	9–10	8–10
Boston	10–8	—	4–3	4–2	6–4	4–2	6–4	4–2	9–10	6–4	3–3	13–6	7–2	7–11	12–6
Chicago	6–2	3–4	—	14–5	14–5	13–5	4–6	11–7	3–3	2–7	6–3	4–2	3–6	4–2	12–6
Cleveland	6–1	2–4	5–14	—	12–6	13–6	3–5	10–9	3–4	6–3	7–3	4–6	3–3	4–2	15–3
Detroit	5–3	4–6	5–14	6–12	—	10–9	4–6	8–11	1–5	1–5	5–4	5–2	4–2	4–3	9–9
Kansas City	2–4	2–4	5–13	6–13	9–10	—	2–7	6–13	3–3	2–4	2–7	3–5	2–8	3–6	9–9
Los Angeles	4–2	4–6	6–4	5–3	6–4	7–2	—	6–4	6–4	10–9	9–9	4–5	15–4	1–5	12–6
Minnesota	3–3	2–4	7–11	9–10	11–8	13–6	4–6	—	3–3	4–6	6–4	6–0	3–6	4–2	8–10
New York	11–7	10–9	3–3	4–3	5–1	3–3	4–6	3–3	—	7–2	7–3	8–11	7–3	12–6	11–7
Oakland	6–4	4–6	7–2	3–6	5–1	4–2	9–10	6–4	2–7	—	12–6	4–5	11–8	5–5	10–8
Seattle	3–7	3–3	3–6	3–7	4–5	7–2	9–9	4–6	3–7	6–12	—	4–2	6–13	4–6	10–8
Tampa Bay	6–12	6–13	2–4	6–4	2–5	5–3	5–4	0–6	11–8	5–4	2–4	—	6–2	8–11	3–15
Texas	6–4	2–7	6–3	3–3	2–4	8–2	4–15	6–3	3–7	8–11	13–6	2–6	—	7–3	9–9
Toronto	10–9	11–7	2–4	2–4	3–4	6–3	5–1	2–4	6–12	5–5	6–4	11–8	3–7	—	8–10

=== Roster ===
2005 Kansas City Royals
Roster
Pitchers: 48 Jeremy Affeldt; 19 Brian Anderson; 27 Denny Bautista; 22 Jonah Bayliss; 50 Ambiorix Burgos; 58 Shawn Camp; 21 D. J. Carrasco; 56 Jaime Cerda; 52 Chris Demaria; 57 Nate Field; 41 Jimmy Gobble; 23 Zack Greinke; 40 Runelvys Hernández; 53 J. P. Howell; 38 Ryan Jensen; 33 José Lima; 54 Mike MacDougal; 43 Juan Carlos Oviedo; 51 Andrew Sisco; 39 Kyle Snyder; 37 Steve Stemle; 46 Mike Wood	Catchers: 2 John Buck; 7 Alberto Castillo; 11 Paul Phillips; Infielders: 4 Ángel Berroa; 7 Andrés Blanco; 30 Rubén Gotay; 14 Tony Graffanino; 28 Ken Harvey; 1 Denny Hocking; 16 Justin Huber; 11 Eli Marrero; 8 Joe McEwing; 31 Donnie Murphy; 12 Matt Stairs; 29 Mike Sweeney; 24 Mark Teahen	Outfielders: 18 Chip Ambres; 35 Emil Brown; 15 Shane Costa; 9 David DeJesus; 34 Matt Diaz; 45 Aaron Guiel; 3 Terrence Long; Other batters: 36 Calvin Pickering	Manager: 25 Buddy Bell; 6 Tony Peña; 44 Bob Schaefer; Coaches: 26 Andre David (hitting); 13 Bill Doran (first base); 37 Guy Hansen (pitching); 18 Joe Jones (first base); 22 Jeff Pentland (hitting); 25 Brian Poldberg (bullpen); 44 Bob Schaefer (bench); 17 Luis Silverio (third base)

== Player stats ==
=== Batting ===
==== Starters by position ====
Note: Pos = Position; G = Games played; AB = At bats; H = Hits; Avg. = Batting average; HR = Home runs; RBI = Runs batted in

Pos	Player	G	AB	H	Avg.	HR	RBI
C	John Buck	118	430	97	.242	12	47
1B	Matt Stairs	127	466	109	.275	13	66
2B	Rubén Gotay	86	317	64	.227	5	29
SS	Angel Berroa	159	652	164	.270	11	55
3B	Mark Teahen	130	447	110	.246	7	55
LF	Terrence Long	137	455	127	.279	6	53
CF	David DeJesus	122	461	135	.293	9	56
RF	Emil Brown	150	545	156	.286	17	86
DH	Mike Sweeney	122	470	141	.300	21	83

==== Other batters ====
Note: G = Games played; AB = At bats; H = Hits; Avg. = Batting average; HR = Home runs; RBI = Runs batted in

Player	G	AB	H	Avg.	HR	RBI
Tony Graffanino	59	191	57	.298	3	18
Joe McEwing	83	180	43	.239	1	6
Chip Ambres	53	145	35	.241	4	9
Aaron Guiel	33	109	32	.294	4	7
Alberto Castillo	34	100	21	.210	1	14
Matt Diaz	34	89	25	.281	1	9
Eli Marrero	32	88	14	.159	4	9
Shane Costa	27	81	19	.235	2	7
Andrés Blanco	26	79	17	.215	0	5
Justin Huber	25	78	17	.218	0	6
Donnie Murphy	32	77	12	.156	1	8
Paul Phillips	23	67	18	.269	1	9
Denny Hocking	23	60	16	.267	0	7
Ken Harvey	12	45	10	.222	1	5
Calvin Pickering	7	27	4	.148	1	3

=== Pitching ===
==== Starting pitchers ====
Note: G = Games pitched; IP = Innings pitched; W = Wins; L = Losses; ERA = Earned run average; SO = Strikeouts

Player	G	IP	W	L	ERA	SO
Zack Greinke	33	183.0	5	17	5.80	114
José Lima	32	168.2	5	16	6.99	80
Runelvys Hernández	29	159.2	8	14	5.52	88
D.J. Carrasco	21	114.2	6	8	4.79	49
J.P. Howell	15	72.2	3	5	6.19	54
Denny Bautista	7	35.2	2	2	5.80	23
Brian Anderson	6	30.2	1	2	6.75	17

==== Other pitchers ====
Note: G = Games pitched; IP = Innings pitched; W = Wins; L = Losses; ERA = Earned run average; SO = Strikeouts

Player	G	IP	W	L	ERA	SO
Mike Wood	47	115.0	5	8	4.46	60
Kyle Snyder	13	36.0	1	3	6.75	17
Ryan Jensen	9	25.1	3	2	7.11	18

==== Relief pitchers ====
Note: G = Games pitched; W = Wins; L = Losses; SV = Saves; ERA = Earned run average; SO = Strikeouts

Player	G	W	L	SV	ERA	SO
Mike MacDougal	68	5	6	21	3.33	72
Andy Sisco	67	2	5	0	3.11	76
Ambiorix Burgos	59	3	5	2	3.98	65
Jeremy Affeldt	49	0	2	0	5.26	39
Juan Carlos Oviedo	41	3	2	0	7.55	32
Shawn Camp	29	1	4	0	6.43	28
Jimmy Gobble	28	1	1	0	5.70	38
Jaime Cerda	20	1	4	0	6.63	18
Jonah Bayliss	11	0	0	0	4.63	10
Chris Demaria	8	1	0	0	9.00	11
Nate Field	7	0	0	0	9.45	4
Steve Stemle	6	0	0	0	5.06	9

== Farm system ==
Level	Team	League	Manager
AAA	Omaha Royals	Pacific Coast League	Mike Jirschele
AA	Wichita Wranglers	Texas League	Frank White
A	High Desert Mavericks	California League	Billy Gardner Jr.
A	Burlington Bees	Midwest League	Jim Gabella
Rookie	AZL Royals	Arizona League	Lloyd Simmons
Rookie	Idaho Falls Chukars	Pioneer League	Brian Rupp
