= Shawn Sedlacek =

American baseball player

- Pitcher
- Born: June 29, 1977 (age 48); Cedar Rapids, Iowa, U.S.
- Batted: Right Threw: Right

MLB debut
- June 18, 2002, for the Kansas City Royals

Last MLB appearance
- September 27, 2002, for the Kansas City Royals

MLB statistics
- Win–loss record: 3−5
- Earned run average: 6.72
- Strikeouts: 52
- Stats at Baseball Reference

Teams
- Kansas City Royals (2002)

Shawn Patrick Sedlacek [sed′–la–check] (born June 29, 1977) is an American former professional baseball pitcher. He played part of one season in Major League Baseball (MLB), primarily as a starting pitcher, for the Kansas City Royals in 2002. Sedlacek threw a four-seam fastball, a two-seam fastball, a changeup, a slider, and a curveball.

Born in Cedar Rapids, Iowa, Sedlacek attended Iowa State University, leading the team with 65 strikeouts and 77 innings pitched as a senior before getting selected by the Royals in the 1998 MLB draft. Initially expected to be a relief pitcher, he became a starting pitcher during his first season due to injuries to other starters, and he would finish among the leaders in the minor leagues he pitched in over the next few years. The Royals called him up in June 2002 following injuries to Jeremy Affeldt and Paul Byrd, and he debuted for them on June 18. Sedlacek posted a 3.05 earned run average (ERA) in his first six starts but had a 10.10 ERA in his next eight and was moved to the bullpen in September. After pitching for Kansas City's minor league affiliates in 2003, he left the Royals organization and played for two years in the minors for several other teams and also in the independent Northern League. Remaining in the Kansas City area following his retirement, he is part of Complete Game Baseball, an organization that provides baseball training and fields its own teams.

== Early life ==
Shawn Patrick Sedlacek was born on June 29, 1977, to Pat and Arlis Sedlacek in Cedar Rapids, Iowa. He was one of two children, the other being sister Sara. Shawn played Babe Ruth League baseball while growing up, getting instructed on pitching from local resident Gary Ray. Sedlacek continued to play baseball at Kennedy High School, graduating in 1994.

Sedlacek attended Indian Hills Community College for two years, then transferred to Iowa State University, which offered him a baseball scholarship. As a senior, he overcame an 0–4 start to post a 6–6 record for the Cyclones. His fastball velocity rose from 85 miles per hour (137 km/h) to the low-to-mid 90 miles per hour (145 km/h) range during the year, and he led Iowa State pitchers with 65 strikeouts and 77 innings pitched.

== Professional career ==
=== Minor league career, part 1 ===
After graduating from Iowa State in 1998, Sedlacek was drafted by the Kansas City Royals in the 14th round of the 1998 Major League Baseball (MLB) draft. He began his minor league career pitching for the Spokane Indians of the Single-A (short season) Northwest League. Manager Jeff Garber expected Sedlacek to pitch out of the bullpen, but injuries to two of Spokane's starting pitchers led to Sedlacek becoming the team's best starter. In 16 games (13 starts), he had a 9–2 record (tying for the league lead in wins with Chris Mears), a 3.45 earned run average (ERA) (fifth), 62 strikeouts, and 18 walks in 86 innings pitched (third behind Mears's 98 2/3 and Jeff Hundley's 92 2/3).

In 1999, Sedlacek pitched for the Wilmington Blue Rocks of the Single-A advanced Carolina League. He missed two months with a broken thumb suffered in May. In 17 starts, he had a 4–6 record, a 5.28 ERA, 69 strikeouts, and 26 walks in 92 innings pitched. He was promoted to the Wichita Wranglers of the Double-A Texas League in 2000. In 35 games, he had a 3.66 ERA, 81 strikeouts, and 43 walks in 140 1/3 innings pitched (10th in the league). Despite only making 16 starts, he led the league with 15 wins.

Despite his successful 2000 season, Sedlacek began 2001 with the Wranglers. "I'm approaching this as a whole new season," he said. In 14 starts with Wichita, he had a 6–7 record, a 3.63 ERA, 66 strikeouts, and 14 walks in 86 2/3 innings. During the season, he was promoted to the Omaha Golden Spikes of the Triple-A Pacific Coast League (PCL). In 14 games (13 starts) for Omaha, he had a 5–4 record, a 5.00 ERA, 44 strikeouts, and 22 walks in 81 innings.

"We're not exactly sure why Shawn Sedlacek is back with the Wranglers," wrote Adam Knapp of The Wichita Eagle, but Sedlacek opened the 2002 season in Double-A. He made only three starts for Wichita before getting promoted to Omaha (now known as the Royals) on April 20. In 11 games (all starts) for Omaha, he had a 6–5 record, a 3.70 ERA, and 66 strikeouts in 80 1/3 innings pitched.

=== Lone season in the majors ===
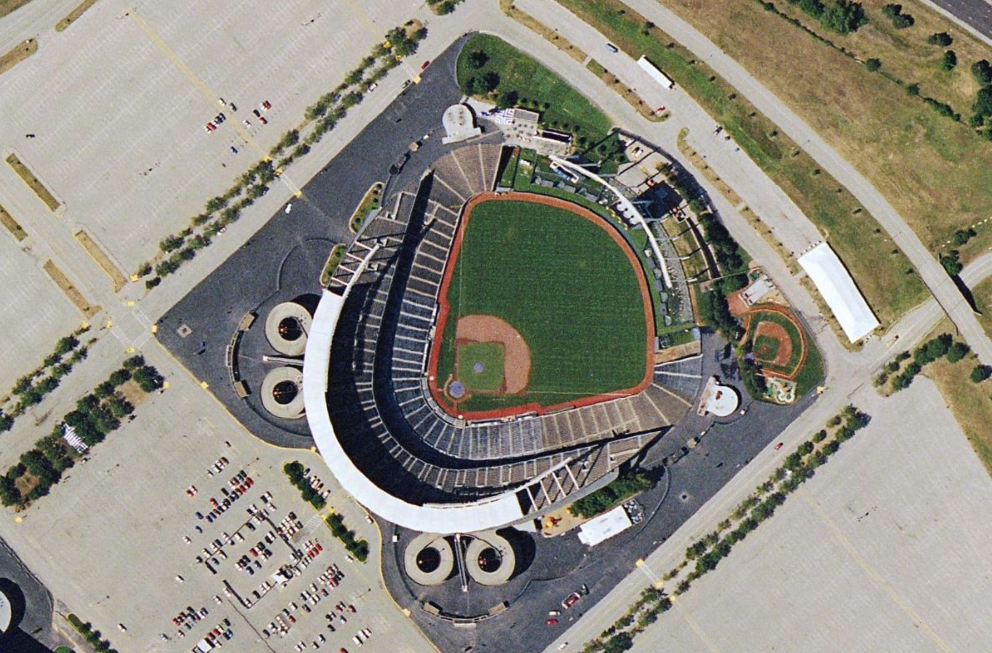
Kauffman Stadium was Sedlacek's home ballpark during his time in the major leagues.

In June 2002, Sedlacek was called up by the Royals following injuries to Jeremy Affeldt and Paul Byrd. He made his major league debut on June 18, getting a no-decision in a 5-4 loss to the Montreal Expos. "This kid was throwing real well...he did a great job," said Royals manager Tony Peña. Five days later, in his second start, he gave up one run in six innings but took a no-decision in a 5–4 loss to the New York Mets. On July 4, Sedlacek had one of the best starts of his career; he allowed one run in a career-high seven innings, receiving a no-decision in a 3–2 loss to the Oakland Athletics. His first career win came on July 15, in the first game of a doubleheader, when he gave up three runs in six innings as the Royals defeated the Texas Rangers 8–6. Five days later, he tied his career high with seven innings pitched and allowed just two runs, but he received a no decision in a 5–3 loss to the Cleveland Indians. Through six starts, he had a 1–0 record and a 3.05 ERA.

Over his next eight starts, from July 26 through September 6, Sedlacek had a 2–5 record and a 10.10 ERA. The Royals, who had initially expanded to a six-man starting rotation when Darrell May returned from the disabled list in September, decided to move Sedlacek to the bullpen after his last start on September 6. "He's all messed up right now," said Peña. Sedlacek attributed his struggles to fatigue, as he was in the process of setting a new career high in innings pitched (183). He only made two more appearances all year, relief outings on September 17 and 27, in which he gave up four runs (two in each). He played in 16 games (14 starts), going 3-5 with a 6.72 ERA and 52 strikeouts in what would be his only major league season.

=== Minor league career, part 2 ===
Sedlacek was reassigned to Omaha on March 17, 2003, during spring training. He got off to an 0–6 start, not winning a game until May 17, when he allowed three runs (one earned) over 6 1/3 innings in a 7–3 victory over the Iowa Cubs. In 27 games (13 starts) for Omaha, he had a 4–11 record, a 6.45 ERA, and 52 strikeouts in 96 1/3 innings pitched. He also made five starts for Wichita, posting a 1–2 record and a 5.60 ERA.

On January 26, 2004, Sedlacek was traded to the Mets for Jaime Cerda. He was assigned to the Binghamton Mets of the Double-A Eastern League. In eight games (one start), he had an 0–1 record, an 11.20 ERA, and 11 strikeouts in 13 2/3 innings. He was released on May 8.

Three days after being released by the Mets, Sedlacek signed with the Chicago Cubs and was assigned to Iowa. In 22 starts, he had a 10–7 record, a 4.32 ERA, and 95 strikeouts in 131 1/3 innings pitched. He became a free agent after the season.

On February 28, 2005, Sedlacek signed with the Colorado Rockies. He started one game for the PCL's Colorado Springs Sky Sox before getting traded to the St. Louis Cardinals on April 17. In five games (three starts) for the PCL's Memphis Redbirds, he had a 1–2 record, a 10.80 ERA, and 11 strikeouts in 15 innings before getting released on May 18.

Sedlacek signed with the Winnipeg Goldeyes of the independent Northern League on May 27. In 17 games (all starts), he had a 6–5 record, a 3.38 ERA, and 92 strikeouts in 127 2/3 innings pitched. His contract was sold to the Baltimore Orioles on August 26, and Sedlacek made two starts for the Triple-A Ottawa Lynx of the International League, losing both of them and posting an 11.00 ERA. After the season, he retired.

== Pitching style ==
A right-handed pitcher, Sedlacek threw two varieties of fastball: a four-seamer and a two-seamer. In addition, he threw a changeup, a slider, and a curveball. Not a hard thrower, Sedlacek said that to succeed, he had to "throw strikes, pitch inside, pitch ahead in the count." While with the Royals, he formed a friendship with Mike Boddicker, a former MLB pitcher who also was not a hard thrower in his career. Boddicker advised him to throw pitches high and inside of the strike zone, as well as low and away. He also advised Sedlacek to try to fool the hitters by making them expect a different pitch than the one he would actually throw. Peña noted that Sedlacek would challenge hitters and throw any of his pitches on any pitch count. "It's hard to sit on any of his pitches," Peña said.

== Personal life ==
Sedlacek's wife, Joy, once served as the Senior Director of Royals' charities. They live in Overland Park, Kansas, and have one child. Initially beginning a career in financial services in retirement, Sedlacek wanted to remain active in baseball. In 2006, he started Sed Sports, Inc. Originally, the organization offered pitching lessons to amateurs and professionals in the Kansas City metro area. Sed Sports began fielding its own teams in 2012. The next year, Sedlacek partnered with Todd Sears and Matt Williams. They changed the name of the organization to Complete Game Baseball, which has since grown to field 25 teams.
