= Jonathan Broxton =

American baseball player (born 1984)

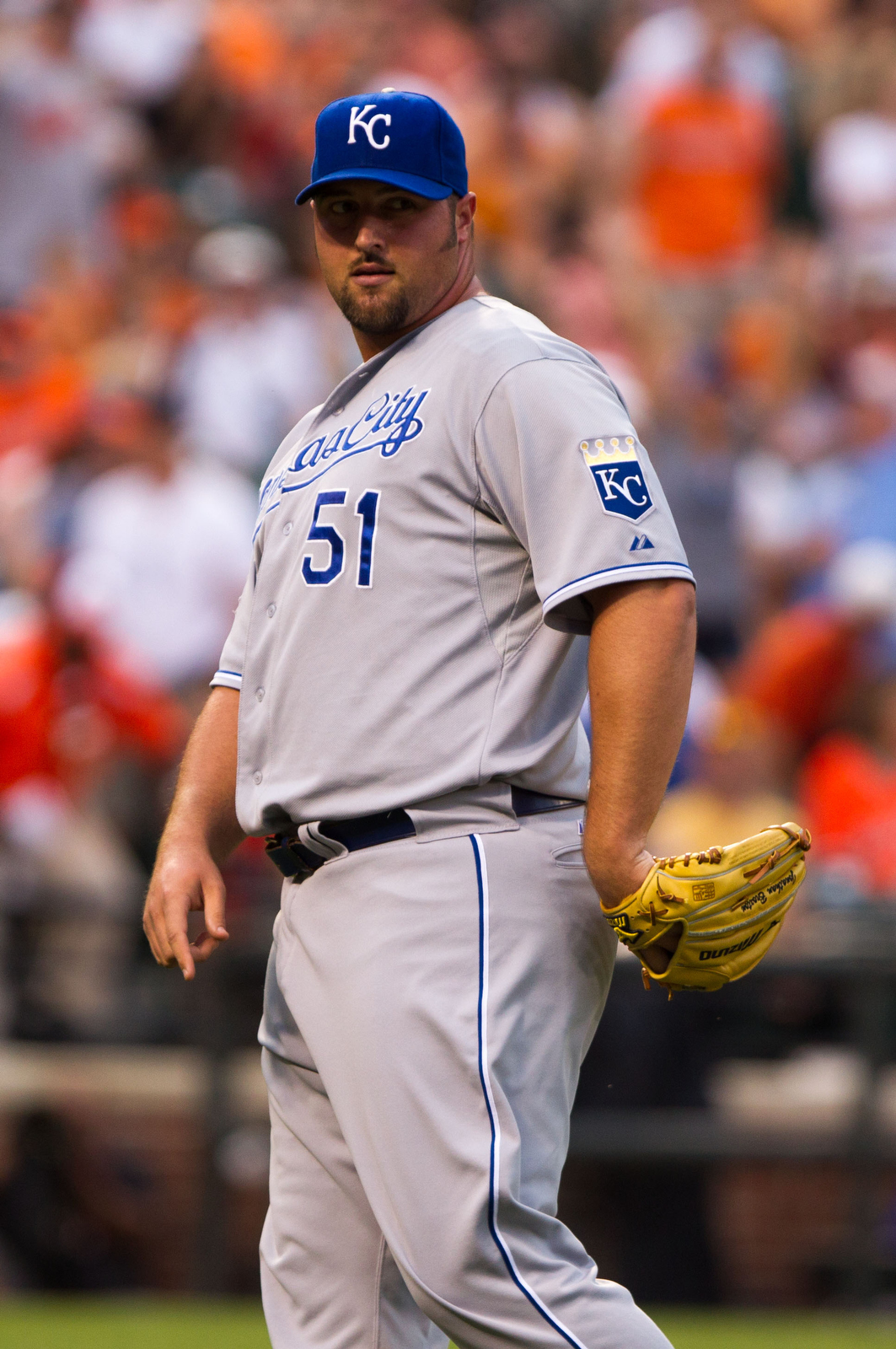
- Broxton with the Kansas City Royals
- Pitcher
- Born: June 16, 1984 (age 42); Augusta, Georgia, U.S.
- Batted: Right Threw: Right

MLB debut
- July 29, 2005, for the Los Angeles Dodgers

Last MLB appearance
- May 30, 2017, for the St. Louis Cardinals

MLB statistics
- Win–loss record: 43–38
- Earned run average: 3.41
- Strikeouts: 758
- Saves: 118
- Stats at Baseball Reference

Teams
- Los Angeles Dodgers (2005–2011); Kansas City Royals (2012); Cincinnati Reds (2012–2014); Milwaukee Brewers (2014–2015); St. Louis Cardinals (2015–2017)

Career highlights and awards
- 2× All-Star (2009, 2010)

Jonathan Roy Broxton (born June 16, 1984) is an American former professional baseball relief pitcher. He played in Major League Baseball (MLB) for the Los Angeles Dodgers, Kansas City Royals, Cincinnati Reds, Milwaukee Brewers and St. Louis Cardinals.

== Early life ==
Broxton attended Burke County High School in Waynesboro, Georgia. As a senior for the Bears, he posted a 9–2 record and a 1.21 earned run average as a pitcher. As a hitter, he had a .596 batting average with seven home runs. As a teenager, Broxton stood 6 feet 4 inches (1.93 m) tall, weighed 250 pounds (110 kg) and was athletic enough to dunk a basketball with two hands. The football coaches at his high school tried unsuccessfully to convince him to play football as a lineman.

Broxton committed to play college baseball at Georgia Southern. He was drafted by the Los Angeles Dodgers in the second round in 2002 MLB draft and signed with them for $685,000 on June 30, 2002.

== Playing career ==
=== Minor leagues ===
In the minor leagues, from 2002 to 2006, Broxton was 23–11 with 12 saves and a 3.03 ERA in 303 innings. He struck out 332 batters, while walking 115 and giving up 244 hits.

His minor league teams were the Great Falls Dodgers of the Pioneer League, the South Georgia Waves of the South Atlantic League, the Vero Beach Dodgers of the Florida State League, and the "AA" Jacksonville Suns of the Southern League.

=== Los Angeles Dodgers ===
Broxton made his MLB debut on July 29, 2005, against the St. Louis Cardinals, pitching one inning in relief, allowing one run, and striking out two. His first MLB strikeout victim was the Cardinals' Albert Pujols. During the 2005 campaign, he appeared in 14 games, all in relief, striking out 22 batters in only 13 2/3 innings.

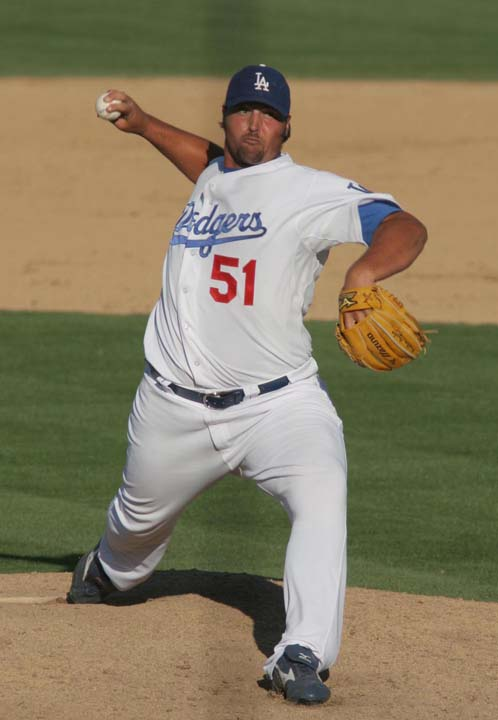
Broxton pitching during spring training in Arizona in 2008

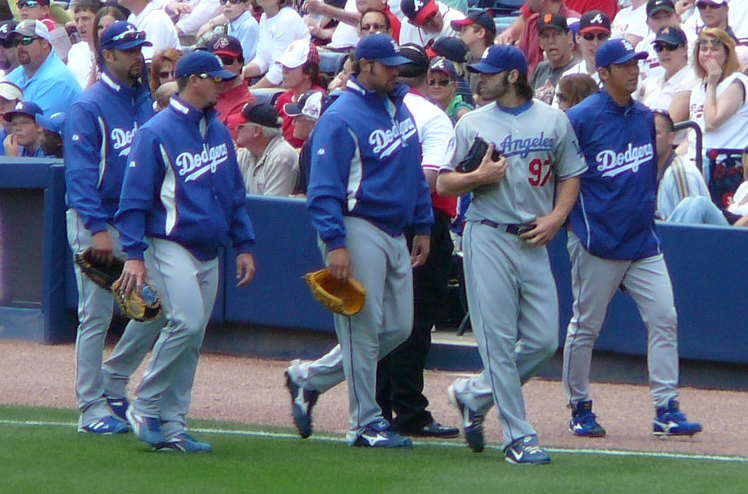
Broxton (center) with fellow Dodgers pitchers Esteban Loaiza, Scott Proctor, Joe Beimel and Takashi Saito in 2008

Broxton began the 2006 season with the Dodgers Triple-A affiliate, the Las Vegas 51s. After allowing no runs in 11 appearances (with 18 strikeouts), on May 1, 2006, Broxton was recalled from the minors after the demotion of veteran Lance Carter.

After gaining the confidence of manager Grady Little, Broxton became Takashi Saito's primary setup man, and the team's backup closer.

He held batters to a .159 Batting average with runners in scoring position, and held right-handed batters to a .196 batting average.

He appeared in a career-high 83 games for the Dodgers, third most in the National League and fourth most in franchise history. He threw 99 strikeouts (second most among all big league relievers) and ranked fifth in the Majors with 32 holds. His 2.85 ERA placed him as one of nine Major League pitchers with more than 75 innings pitched and an era below 3.78.

Broxton recorded 96 2/3 consecutive no-home-run innings from July 23, 2006, to August 21, 2007. That was the longest streak in team history since the Dodgers moved to Los Angeles in 1958.

On July 19, 2008, Saito was placed on the disabled list (DL), and Broxton inherited the closer role for the remainder of the season. He allowed a pinch hit two-run homer to Matt Stairs of the Philadelphia Phillies in the 8th inning of Game 4 of the 2008 NLCS.

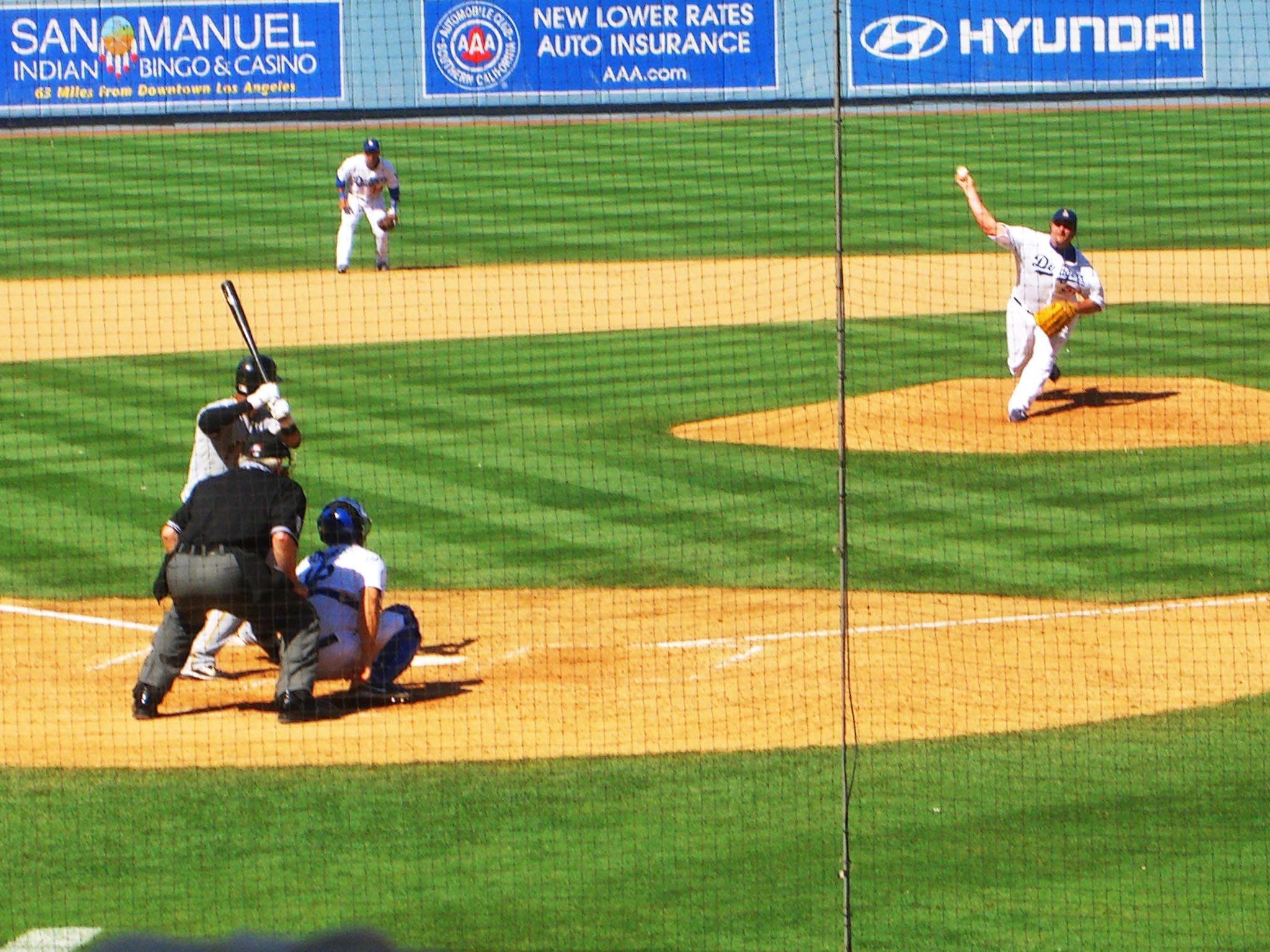
Broxton closes out a game versus the Pittsburgh Pirates in his first full season as closer.

In his first season as the full-time closer for the Dodgers, Broxton was selected to the National League All-Star team. However, he was unable to play in the Game due to injury. His final regular season record was 7–2 with a 2.61 ERA, 36 saves and 114 strikeouts. Despite his accomplished season, he suffered a costly blown save in Game 4 of the 2009 National League Championship Series against the Philadelphia Phillies when he walked Matt Stairs, hit Carlos Ruiz with a pitch and then allowed a two out/two run walk off hit by Jimmy Rollins.

Broxton had an excellent first half of the season and was selected to the 2010 Major League Baseball All-Star Game, in which he recorded the save. However, he faded in the second half, beginning with a blown save against the New York Yankees in which he threw 48 pitches and allowed 4 runs on 4 hits and 2 walks. In somewhat of a repeat performance against the Phillies, he blew another 4-run lead on August 12, as this time it was Carlos Ruiz delivering the 2-run walk-off hit. He was replaced as the closer at the end of the season by Hong-Chih Kuo.

Broxton returned to the closer role at the start of the 2011 season and appeared in 14 games in March and April, with a 5.68 ERA and 7 saves. On May 4, he admitted that he had been feeling some pain in his elbow and he was placed on the disabled list. After a couple of months off he made two rehab appearances with the AAA Albuquerque Isotopes on June 21 and 23 but felt tightness in his shoulder when throwing on June 25 and was shut down again. He had hoped to return in September but manager Don Mattingly said that his return would be late, if he returned at all. He had another setback after testing his elbow off a mound in September and was shut down for the season. He became a free agent at the conclusion of the season.

=== Kansas City Royals ===
On November 29, 2011, Broxton signed a one-year, $4 million contract with the Kansas City Royals.

On April 11, 2012, Broxton tied a dubious record for a major-league pitcher by ending and losing a game on consecutive hits by pitch (HBP). The last time this happened was on September 2, 1966, when Stu Miller of the Baltimore Orioles hit Al Weis and Tommie Agee of the Chicago White Sox.

Overall, Broxton had a strong first half, posting a 2.05 ERA, with 20 saves in 23 save opportunities through July 1.

=== Cincinnati Reds ===
On the July 31, 2012, MLB non-waiver trade deadline, Broxton was dealt to the Cincinnati Reds in exchange for minor league pitchers J. C. Sulbaran and Donnie Joseph.

On November 28, 2012, Broxton agreed to terms on a multi-year extension with the Reds. He was placed on the 15-day disabled list on June 15, 2013, due to a right elbow flexor strain. He was placed on the DL again in August.

After closer Aroldis Chapman was hit in the head with a line drive on March 19, Broxton took over closing duties for the Reds to start the 2014 season.

=== Milwaukee Brewers ===
A sample of Broxton pitching motion in 2015

On August 31, 2014, Broxton was traded to the Milwaukee Brewers for two players to be named later. On September 10, the Brewers agreed to send Kevin Shackelford and Barrett Astin to the Reds to complete the trade.

=== St. Louis Cardinals ===
On July 31, 2015, Broxton was traded to the St. Louis Cardinals in exchange for minor league outfielder Malik Collymore. The Brewers also sent cash, as the pitcher's 2015 salary was $9 million ($12,239,949.4 today), and he would have been arbitration eligible in 2016 with a $2 million ($2,719,988.8 today) buyout. Broxton made his Cardinals debut on August 1 in a 6–2 loss to the Colorado Rockies, pitching one scoreless inning, and allowing no runners to reach base. He completed 24 innings, striking out 26 with 12 walks and a 2.66 ERA. The Cardinals declined the $9 million option after the season, buying it out for $2 million and making him a free agent.

On December 10, 2015, the Cardinals re-signed Broxton to a two-year contract worth $7.5 million. He started the season with a 2.25 ERA through May 19, but after allowing five earned runs while recording one out against the Arizona Diamondbacks on May 20, his ERA jumped to 4.96. As a result, infielder Rubén Tejada made his major league pitching debut in the ninth inning of that game. The Cardinals released Broxton on May 31, 2017, after he posted a 6.89 ERA in 15.2 innings pitched.

== International career ==
Broxton was selected for the United States national baseball team in the 2009 World Baseball Classic during March 2009.

== Scouting report ==
The 6 ft 4 in (1.93 m), 305 lb (138 kg) Broxton featured a mid-90s fastball as well as a slider. His fastball velocity reached 102 mph in the 2009 MLB season.

== Personal life ==
Broxton and his wife, Elizabeth, married in January 2006. The couple had their first child, a son, on June 11, 2009.

Broxton became the head baseball coach at Edmund Burke Academy in Burke County, Georgia in March 2018. He brought on his father, Randy, as an assistant coach. The school won the state championship in Broxton's first season as head coach.

== See also ==
- Cincinnati Reds all-time roster
- Kansas City Royals all-time roster
- Los Angeles Dodgers all-time roster
- Milwaukee Brewers all-time roster
- St. Louis Cardinals all-time roster
