= Keith Marshall (baseball) =

American baseball player (born 1951)

- Outfielder
- Born: July 2, 1951 (age 75); San Francisco, California, U.S.
- Batted: Right Threw: Right

MLB debut
- April 7, 1973, for the Kansas City Royals

Last MLB appearance
- April 24, 1973, for the Kansas City Royals

MLB statistics
- Batting average: .222
- Home runs: 0
- Runs batted in: 3
- Stats at Baseball Reference

Teams
- Kansas City Royals (1973)

Keith Alan Marshall (born July 2, 1951) is an American former Major League Baseball outfielder. He played eight games for the Kansas City Royals in 1973. He played in the minor leagues from 1969 until 1976, all in the Royals' organization except his final year, when he played for the Cincinnati Reds' top farm club, the Indianapolis Indians.

== Sources ==
- Career statistics from Baseball Reference · Baseball Reference (Minors) · Retrosheet · Baseball Almanac
- Baseball Almanac
