= Barry Raziano =

American baseball player (born 1947)

- Pitcher
- Born: February 5, 1947 (age 78); New Orleans, Louisiana, U.S.
- Batted: Switch Threw: Right

MLB debut
- August 18, 1973, for the Kansas City Royals

Last MLB appearance
- July 5, 1974, for the California Angels

MLB statistics
- Win–loss record: 1–2
- Earned run average: 6.23
- Strikeouts: 9
- Stats at Baseball Reference

Teams
- Kansas City Royals (1973); California Angels (1974)

Barry John Raziano (born February 5, 1947) is a former professional baseball player who pitched in parts of the 1973 and 1974 seasons for the Kansas City Royals and California Angels, respectively, of Major League Baseball. Raziano was originally drafted by the New York Mets in the 47th round of the 1965 draft and was traded to Kansas City for Jerry Cram on February 1, 1973. Raziano was traded to the Angels for Vada Pinson and cash in February 1974 and made 13 appearances for them, also pitching for the Angels' AAA team at Salt Lake City in 1974 and 1975. After not pitching in 1976, his professional career ended with 20 relief appearances for the St. Louis Cardinals in AA New Orleans, 1977.
