= Eduardo Villacis =

Venezuelan baseball player (born 1979)

- Pitcher
- Born: August 29, 1979 (age 46); Caracas, Venezuela
- Batted: Right Threw: Right

MLB debut
- May 1, 2004, for the Kansas City Royals

Last MLB appearance
- May 1, 2004, for the Kansas City Royals

MLB statistics
- Win–loss record: 0–1
- Earned run average: 13.50
- Strikeouts: 0
- Walks: 4
- Innings pitched: 31/3
- Stats at Baseball Reference

Teams
- Kansas City Royals (2004)

Eduardo Enrique Villacis (born August 29, 1979) is a Venezuelan former starting pitcher in Major League Baseball who played for the Kansas City Royals in their 2004 season. Listed at 6 ft 2 in (1.88 m), 170 pounds (77 kg), Villacis batted and threw right handed. He was born in Caracas, Venezuela.

== Career ==
Villacis was originally signed by the Colorado Rockies as a rookie free agent out of Venezuela in 1998, under the recommendation of scout and former big leaguer Jorge Posada.

Villacis started his career in the Rockies Minor League system in 2000, playing for them in parts of five seasons before being dealt to Kansas City in exchange for colleague pitcher Bryan Rekar. He then was assigned to Double-A Wichita Wranglers.

On May 1, 2004, the Royals called up him to start a game against the New York Yankees in Yankee Stadium. Villacis lasted only 31/3 innings, allowing five runs on six hits and four walks without strikeouts and was credited with the loss. He was sent back to Wichita two days later. On May 26, the Chicago White Sox claimed Villacis off waivers from Kansas City and optioned him to Double-A Birmingham Barons, but he never appeared in a major league game again.

In 2006, Villacis played for the Atlantic City Surf of the independent Atlantic League, during what turned out to be his final year in baseball. Overall, he posted a 29–17 record with a 3.58 earned run average in 145 career minor league games, including 49 starts, from 2000 to 2006.

In between, Villacis played winter ball with the Leones del Caracas and Tiburones de La Guaira clubs of the Venezuelan League during seven seasons spanning 1998–2005. He started eight games and relieved in 97 more, going 8–5 with a 3.87 ERA and one save in 151 innings of work.

== See also ==
- List of Major League Baseball players from Venezuela
