= Adrian Brown (baseball) =

American baseball player (born 1974)

- Outfielder
- Born: February 7, 1974 (age 52); McComb, Mississippi, U.S.
- Batted: Switch Threw: Right

MLB debut
- May 16, 1997, for the Pittsburgh Pirates

Last MLB appearance
- May 23, 2006, for the Texas Rangers

MLB statistics
- Batting average: .258
- Home runs: 11
- Runs batted in: 86
- Stats at Baseball Reference

Teams
- Pittsburgh Pirates (1997–2002); Boston Red Sox (2003); Kansas City Royals (2004); Texas Rangers (2006)

Adrian Demond Brown (born February 7, 1974) is an American former professional baseball outfielder who played from 1997 through 2006 in Major League Baseball (MLB). Brown is a switch-hitter and throws right-handed.

Brown has the ability to play all three outfield positions, mainly center field. He reached MLB in 1997 with the Pittsburgh Pirates, spending six years with them before moving to the Boston Red Sox (2003) Kansas City Royals (2004), and Texas Rangers (2006). His most productive season came in 2000 with Pittsburgh, when he posted career-highs in batting average (.315), home runs (4), RBI (28), runs (64), doubles (18), and stolen bases (13) in 104 games.
