= Justin Huisman =

American baseball player (born 1979)

- Relief pitcher
- Born: April 16, 1979 (age 47); Harvey, Illinois, U.S.
- Batted: Right Threw: Right

MLB debut
- April 25, 2004, for the Kansas City Royals

Last MLB appearance
- July 19, 2004, for the Kansas City Royals

MLB statistics
- Win–loss record: 0–0
- Earned run average: 6.84
- Strikeouts: 13
- Stats at Baseball Reference

Teams
- Kansas City Royals (2004)

Justin Ray Huisman (born April 16, 1979) is an American former Major League Baseball relief pitcher who played for the Kansas City Royals in 2004.

== Amateur career ==
A native of Harvey, Illinois, Huisman attended Thornwood High School and the University of Mississippi. In 1999 he played collegiate summer baseball with the Cotuit Kettleers of the Cape Cod Baseball League. Huisman had a 3.50 ERA at Mississippi in 2000.

== Professional career ==
Huisman was drafted by the Colorado Rockies in the 15th round of the 2000 Major League Baseball draft. He was assigned to the Low-A Portland Rockies where he had a 1.86 ERA in 43 2/3 innings. In 2001, he began the season with the Single-A Asheville Tourists where he spent the entire year. In 55 games, he had a 1.70 ERA and a .84 WHIP. Huisman began 2002 with High-A Salem and had a 1.57 ERA in 41 games, earning a promotion to Double-A Carolina. In 2003, he went 7-2 with a 1.75 ERA and was named a Double-A All-Star with the Rockies new Double-A affiliate in Tulsa.

On April 8, 2004, Huisman was traded to the Kansas City Royals for Zach McClellan and minor leaguer Chris Fallon. He split the season between Triple-A Omaha and the Royals, making his major league debut on April 25. In his only major league season, Huisman posted a 6.84 ERA over 25 innings in 14 appearances on the mound for Kansas City.

Huisman spent all of 2005 with Triple-A Omaha and was released on April 14, 2006. On April 19, he signed a minor league contract with the Houston Astros and played 6 games with Triple-A Round Rock before being sent to the Seattle Mariners on May 12 as part of a conditional deal. He had a 7.67 ERA with Triple-A Tacoma before his release. In 2007, he played for the independent Newark Bears of the Atlantic League and had a 1.75 ERA in 25 games.
