= Mendy López =

Dominican baseball player (born 1973)

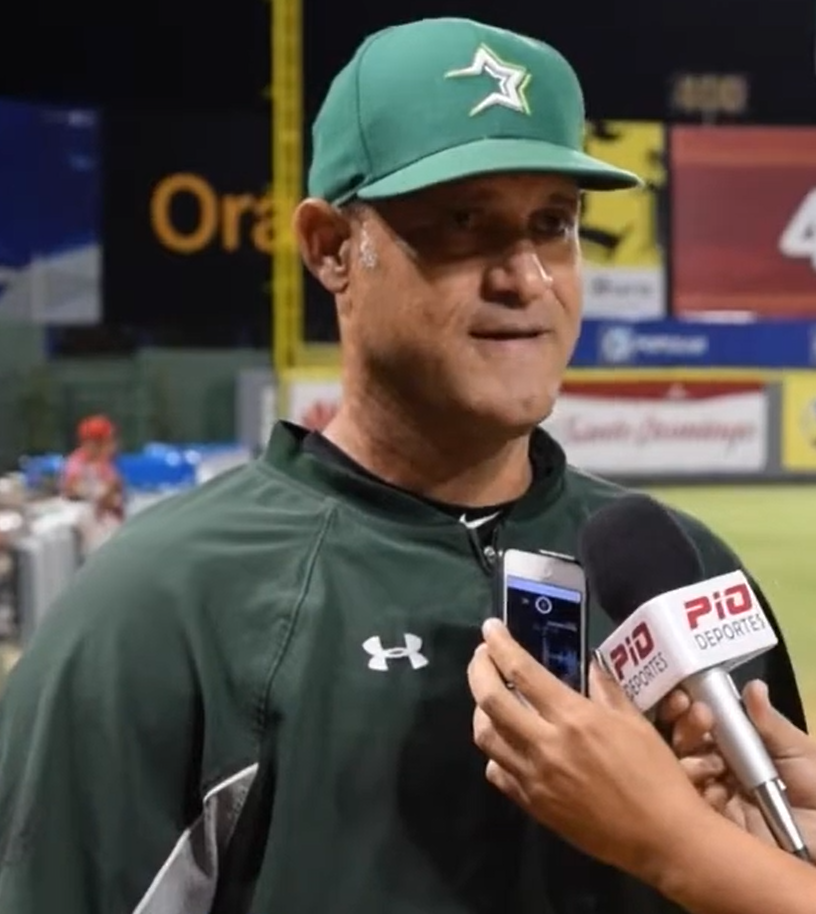
- López with Estrellas Orientales in 2015

Pittsburgh Pirates
- Infielder / Coach / Manager
- Born: October 15, 1973 (age 53); Santo Domingo, Dominican Republic
- Batted: Right Threw: Right

MLB debut
- June 3, 1998, for the Kansas City Royals

Last MLB appearance
- May 27, 2004, for the Kansas City Royals

MLB statistics
- Batting average: .242
- Home runs: 6
- Runs batted in: 40

KBO statistics
- Batting average: .162
- Home runs: 3
- Runs batted in: 8
- Stats at Baseball Reference

Teams
- As player: Kansas City Royals (1998–1999); Florida Marlins (2000); Houston Astros (2001); Pittsburgh Pirates (2001–2002); Kansas City Royals (2003–2004); Samsung Lions (2004); As coach: Pittsburgh Pirates (2023–2025)

Mendy López Aude (born October 15, 1973) is a Dominican former professional baseball infielder and coach. He played in Major League Baseball for the Kansas City Royals, Florida Marlins, Houston Astros, and Pittsburgh Pirates from 1998 to 2004, and in the KBO League for the Samsung Lions in 2004. He is currently an international operations advisor for the Pittsburgh Pirates organization.

== Playing career ==
López was signed as an amateur free agent by the Kansas City Royals on February 26, 1992. He is often referred to as a "journeyman", a title bestowed upon those in the sports world who play on several different teams within a short amount of time. Lopez has played for four Major League Baseball teams over the span of his 7-year career: the Kansas City Royals (1998–1999, 2003–2004), the Florida Marlins (2000), the Houston Astros (2001), and the Pittsburgh Pirates (2001–2002).

On July 9, 2004, the Kansas City Royals sold his contract to the Samsung Lions of the Korea Baseball Organization. He was selected as the most valuable player of the best-of-five playoff series where the Lions defeated the Doosan Bears to advance to the 2004 Korean Series.

In 2007, López played for the Sultanes Monterrey of the Mexican League. He hit .304 with 21 home runs and 67 RBI. In 2008, he again played for Monterrey batting .321 with 22 home runs and 97 RBI. He was named to the midseason All-Star team in 2006, 2007, and 2008. He played for Águilas Cibaeñas in the Dominican Winter League in 2008. Lopez played for the Sultanes de Monterrey of the Mexican League in 2010.

== Coaching career ==
=== Pittsburgh Pirates ===
On November 3, 2022, the Pittsburgh Pirates promoted López to their major league coaching staff.

=== Saraperos de Saltillo ===
On November 17, 2025, López was hired to serve as the manager for he Saraperos de Saltillo of the Mexican League. He was dismissed on May 6, 2026, after a 4–12 start that left the team in last place in the North Zone, and was replaced by Willie Romero as interim manager.

=== Tecolotes de los Dos Laredos ===
On June 26, 2026, López was announced as new manager for the Tecolotes de los Dos Laredos of the Mexican League, replacing Félix Fermín who had led the team to a 24–35 start.

=== Pittsburgh Pirates (second stint) ===
On October 19, 2026, it was announced López had accepted a position as an international operations advisor with the Pittsburgh Pirates organization.
