= Jorge Vásquez (baseball) =

Dominican baseball player (born 1978)

- Relief pitcher
- Born: July 16, 1978 (age 47); Nagua, Dominican Republic
- Batted: Right Threw: Right

MLB debut
- August 13, 2004, for the Kansas City Royals

Last MLB appearance
- July 2, 2005, for the Atlanta Braves

MLB statistics
- Win–loss record: 1-0
- Earned run average: 4.38
- Strikeouts: 13
- Stats at Baseball Reference

Teams
- Kansas City Royals (2004); Atlanta Braves (2005)

Jorge Luis Vásquez (born July 16, 1978) is a Dominican former Major League Baseball pitcher.

== Career ==
Vásquez was signed by the Kansas City Royals as a free agent in 1998. He made his debut with the Royals in 2004. That year, he pitched in two games, had no decisions, and an ERA of 8.10. He struck out four and walked one. That winter, on December 18, he was traded to the Atlanta Braves in exchange for Eli Marrero and cash. That year, he appeared in 5 games, picking up one win, no losses, and having an ERA of 3.00. That winter, the Braves released him and he has not appeared in the majors since. In 2007, he pitched in the Texas Rangers organization.

Vásquez has pitched the past three seasons in the Mexican League. After spending the 2008 and 2009 seasons with the Sultanes de Monterrey, he joined the Piratas de Campeche in 2010. He spent 2012 and 2013 with the Newark Bears of the independent Can-Am League.
