= Damian Jackson (baseball) =

American baseball player (born 1973)

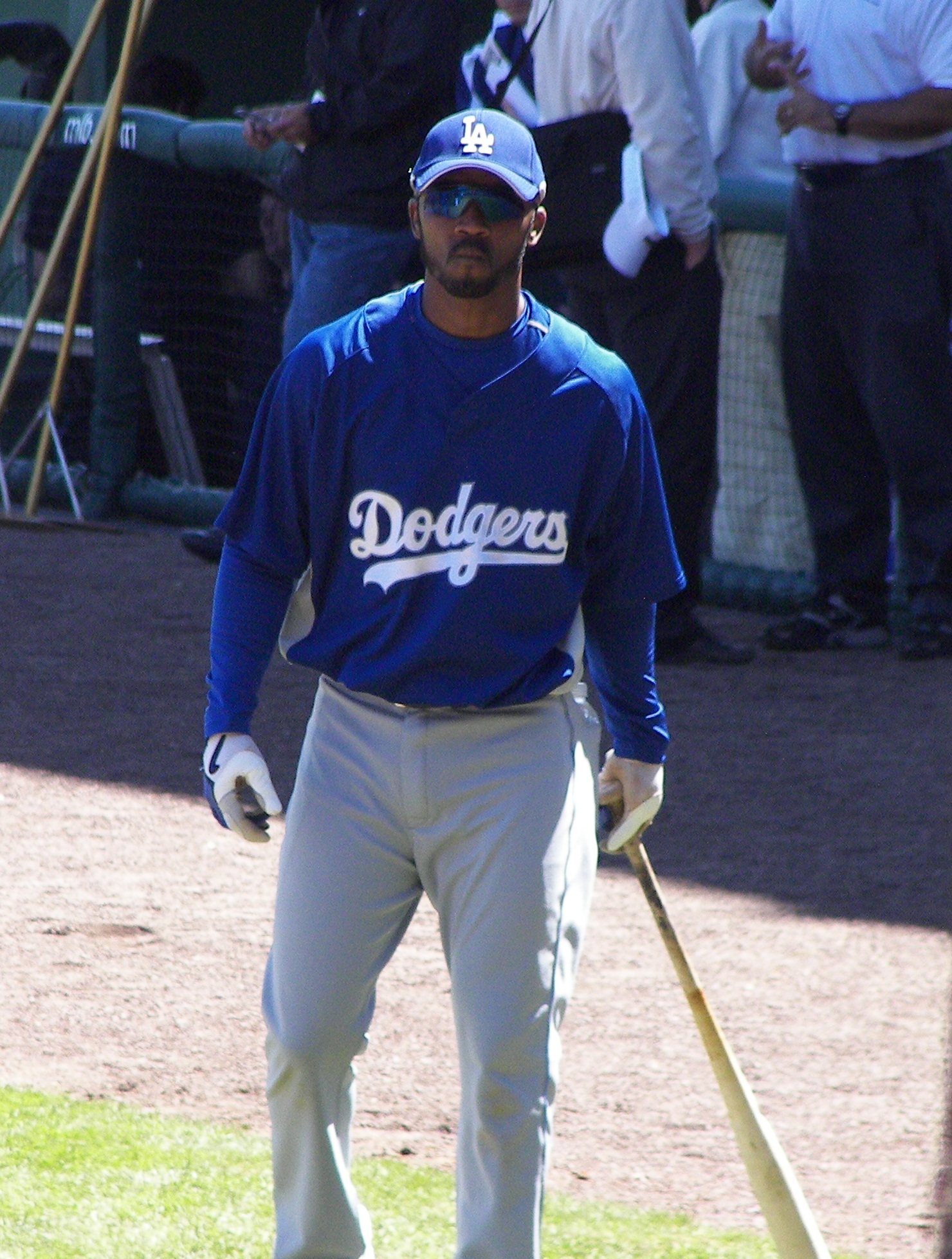
- Jackson at Dodgers spring training in 2007
- Second baseman / Shortstop / Outfielder
- Born: August 16, 1973 (age 52); Los Angeles, California, U.S.
- Batted: Right Threw: Right

MLB debut
- September 12, 1996, for the Cleveland Indians

Last MLB appearance
- August 23, 2006, for the Washington Nationals

MLB statistics
- Batting average: .243
- Home runs: 32
- Runs batted in: 198
- Stats at Baseball Reference

Former teams
- Cleveland Indians (1996–1997); Cincinnati Reds (1997–1998); San Diego Padres (1999–2001); Detroit Tigers (2002); Boston Red Sox (2003); Chicago Cubs (2004); Kansas City Royals (2004); San Diego Padres (2005); Washington Nationals (2006)

Damian Jacques Jackson (born August 16, 1973) is an American former major league second baseman who played 11 seasons for nine Major League Baseball (MLB) teams. He batted and threw right-handed.

== Early life ==
Jackson grew up in Los Angeles, but moved to Northern California when he was in high school. Jackson transferred to Ygnacio Valley High School in Concord, California, when he was a junior. Jackson only played one year of high school baseball, his senior year. He decided to try out for baseball on a whim the first day of baseball, when he saw a friend walking to practice. That season, Jackson caught the eye of pro scouts because of his blazing speed and potent bat.

== Major league career ==
Jackson was drafted by the Cleveland Indians in the 44th round of the 1991 draft. He did not play a full season until he joined the San Diego Padres in 1999 when he led all rookies in stolen bases. He sustained an injury in 2001, when he was hit by A. J. Burnett during Burnett's no-hit game.

On July 14, 2001, Jackson hit a broken-bat grand slam against Wade Miller that helped the Padres beat the Houston Astros. The home run barely cleared the fence down the left-field line, near the 315-foot sign in the hitter-friendly Daikin Park, then named "Enron Field".

During the 2003 American League Division Series, Jackson collided with his Red Sox teammate, center fielder Johnny Damon, knocking Damon unconscious.

He was released by the Washington Nationals on August 25, 2006, and signed with the Los Angeles Dodgers, but was released from them on March 11, 2007.

== Atlantic League ==
On April 14, 2008, Jackson signed with the Southern Maryland Blue Crabs of the independent Atlantic League. He was released on July 22 and was immediately signed by the Long Island Ducks, but was traded on August 2 to the Camden Riversharks. He later played for the Orange County Flyers of the independent Golden Baseball League.
