= Brandon Berger =

American baseball player (born 1975)

- Outfielder
- Born: February 21, 1975 (age 51); Covington, Kentucky, U.S.
- Batted: Right Threw: Right

MLB debut
- September 9, 2001, for the Kansas City Royals

Last MLB appearance
- June 13, 2004, for the Kansas City Royals

MLB statistics
- Batting average: .212
- Home runs: 8
- Runs batted in: 24
- Stats at Baseball Reference

Teams
- Kansas City Royals (2001–2004)

Brandon Charles Berger (born February 21, 1975) is an American former Major League Baseball outfielder who played for the Kansas City Royals from 2001 to 2004.

Berger attended Beechwood High School in Fort Mitchell, Kentucky. He was drafted by the Chicago White Sox in high school, but went to college at Eastern Kentucky University. In 1995, he played collegiate summer baseball with the Cotuit Kettleers of the Cape Cod Baseball League. He was drafted by the Kansas City Royals in the 14th round of the 1996 Major League Baseball draft, and signed on June 4, 1996. He played for the Royals for parts of four seasons between 2001 and 2004. He also owns his own Baseball Training Center, called At The Yard.
