= Ryan Bukvich =

American baseball player (born 1978)

- Relief pitcher
- Born: May 13, 1978 (age 48); Naperville, Illinois, U.S.
- Batted: Right Threw: Right

MLB debut
- July 12, 2002, for the Kansas City Royals

Last MLB appearance
- July 4, 2008, for the Baltimore Orioles

MLB statistics
- Win–loss record: 3–0
- Earned run average: 6.16
- Strikeouts: 62
- Stats at Baseball Reference

Teams
- Kansas City Royals (2002–2004); Texas Rangers (2005); Chicago White Sox (2007); Baltimore Orioles (2008)

Ryan Adrien Bukvich /ˈbʌkvɪtʃ/ (born May 13, 1978) is an American former professional baseball relief pitcher. He played in Major League Baseball (MLB) for the Kansas City Royals, Texas Rangers, Chicago White Sox, and Baltimore Orioles.

== Career ==
Bukvich attended the University of Mississippi. Bukvich was called up to the White Sox in June 2007 along with Bret Prinz, replacing the struggling David Aardsma and Mike MacDougal. While Prinz remained with the team for only a matter of days, Bukvich stayed on the roster despite the subsequent return of both Aardsma and MacDougal. Bukvich appeared in 45 games with the White Sox in 2007, going 1–0 with a 5.05 ERA. His win on June 30, 2007, against the Royals was his first since 2003. He became a cult hero at U.S. Cellular Field, earning the nickname "Iceman" for his cool demeanor in pressure situations. Bukvich signed a minor league contract with the Baltimore Orioles on December 7, 2007.

Bukvich spent time during 2008 spring training recovering from an oblique injury. After several days of extended spring training, he joined the Triple-A Norfolk Tides of the International League. He became a free agent at the end of the season. In May 2009, Bukvich signed with the Newark Bears.
