= Byron Gettis =

American baseball player (born 1980)

- Outfielder
- Born: March 13, 1980 (age 45); Centreville, Illinois, U.S.
- Batted: Right Threw: Right

MLB debut
- May 27, 2004, for the Kansas City Royals

Last MLB appearance
- July 1, 2004, for the Kansas City Royals

MLB statistics
- Batting average: .179
- Home runs: 0
- Runs batted in: 1
- Stats at Baseball Reference

Teams
- Kansas City Royals (2004)

Byron Earl Gettis (born March 13, 1980) is a former outfielder in Major League Baseball for the Kansas City Royals. Gettis graduated from Cahokia Senior High School in 1998, and was signed by the Kansas City Royals as an amateur free agent that same year. He had a career batting average of .179 in 39 at-bats. He was claimed off waivers by the Detroit Tigers on October 15, 2004. He spent 2005 between Double-A Erie and Triple-A Toledo, becoming a free agent after the season.

After the end of his baseball career, Gettis enrolled at Southern Illinois University at Carbondale in 2006. He joined the Salukis football team as a tight end, starting four games in 2007.
