= Jimmy Serrano =

American baseball player (born 1976)

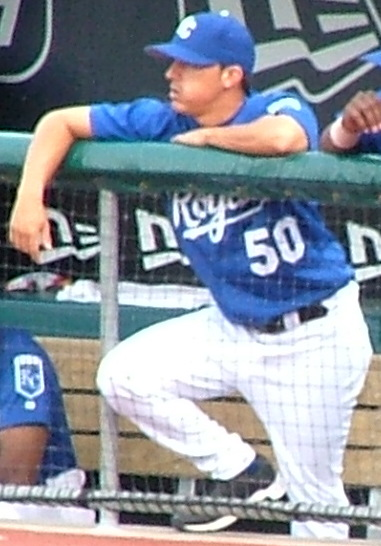
- Serrano with the Kansas City Royals in 2004
- Pitcher
- Born: May 9, 1976 (age 50); Grand Junction, Colorado, U.S.
- Batted: Right Threw: Right

MLB debut
- August 7, 2004, for the Kansas City Royals

Last MLB appearance
- October 3, 2004, for the Kansas City Royals

MLB statistics
- Win–loss record: 1–2
- Earned run average: 4.68
- Strikeouts: 25

KBO statistics
- Win–loss record: 2–3
- Earned run average: 4.12
- Strikeouts: 58
- Stats at Baseball Reference

Teams
- Kansas City Royals (2004); SK Wyverns (2006)

James Serrano (born May 9, 1976) is an American former professional baseball pitcher. He played in Major League Baseball (MLB) for the Kansas City Royals in 2004, and in the KBO League for the SK Wyverns in 2006. He bats and throws right-handed.

== Career ==
Drafted by the Montreal Expos in the 18th round of the 1998 MLB draft after attending the University of New Mexico, Serrano pitched for the Single-A Vermont Expos and Cape Fear Crocs in 1998. In 1999, Serrano had an ERA of 2.13 for the Single-A Jupiter Hammerheads in 44 games and was promoted to Double-A Harrisburg to start 2000. He had a 4.20 ERA and stayed at Double-A in 2001 until a promotion to Triple-A Ottawa after recording a 2.18 ERA.

On March 24, 2002, Serrano was traded to the New York Mets with Jason Bay for Lou Collier. He pitched for Triple-A Norfolk until the Kansas City Royals purchased his contract on July 5, 2003. He made his major league debut for the Royals on August 7, 2004, appearing in 10 games that season, including 5 starts. Serrano became a free agent at the end of the season.

On November 18, 2004, Serrano signed with the Oakland Athletics, with whom he became a full-time starting pitcher. He was released after 16 starts for Triple-A Sacramento during which, he went 8–3, compiled a 3.91 ERA, and struck out 89 in 92 innings. On July 3, he signed with the Cincinnati Reds. In 12 starts for Triple-A Louisville, Serrano had a 3.75 ERA and became a free agent after the season.

On December 9, 2005, Serrano signed with the Boston Red Sox recording a 2.50 ERA for Triple-A Pawtucket, but was released in June. He signed with the Wyverns and finished the 2006 season with them.

On January 4, 2007, Serrano signed a one-year minor league contract with the Florida Marlins and spent most of the year with Double-A Carolina and only 4 games with Triple-A Albuquerque. After sitting out a year, Serrano played for the independent Southern Maryland Blue Crabs in 2009, his most recent professional season.
