= Mike Tonis =

American baseball player (born 1979)

- Catcher
- Born: February 9, 1979 (age 47); Sacramento, California, U.S.
- Batted: Right Threw: Right

MLB debut
- June 20, 2004, for the Kansas City Royals

Last MLB appearance
- June 24, 2004, for the Kansas City Royals

MLB statistics
- Batting average: .000
- Home runs: 0
- Runs batted in: 0
- Stats at Baseball Reference

Teams
- Kansas City Royals (2004)

Michael Timothy Tonis (born February 9, 1979) is a Greek-American former professional baseball catcher. He played in Major League Baseball (MLB) for the Kansas City Royals.

== Career ==
Tonis attended Elk Grove High School and was drafted in the 52nd round of the 1997 Major League Baseball draft by the New York Mets, but did not sign, instead choosing to attend the University of California. In 1998, he played collegiate summer baseball with the Brewster Whitecaps of the Cape Cod Baseball League and was named a league all-star. The Royals drafted him again in the 2nd round of the 2000 draft and he did sign. Tonis's best season was 2001, when he batted .264 with 12 home runs and 61 RBI with the Single-A Wilmington Blue Rocks and Double-A Wichita Wranglers. Prior to the 2002 season, Tonis suffered multiple injuries, which sidelined him for most of the season. When he returned, he was hit in the jaw with a pitch while rehabbing, and was forced to have his jaw wired shut. He was called up from Double-A Wichita in 2004 to make his major league debut on June 20. He played his last game on June 24 before being sent back down to Double-A. He has not played for an MLB affiliated team since.

Tonis joined the Greek baseball team for the 2004 Athens Olympics. Mike played for Greece and used his complete Greek name which is Michael Koutsantonakis. As was the case with many Greek immigrants to America, Mike's grandfather abbreviated his original Greek last name to an easier to pronounce and spell "Americanized" name.

After the Athens 2004 Olympics, Mike continued to be an active roster player for the Greek National Baseball Team. He played for Greece in the 2008 European Qualifier Cup in Abrandes, Portugal; in the 2010 European Seniors Championship in Stuttgart, Germany; and in the 2011 IBAF Baseball World Cup in Panama.

== See also ==
- List of baseball players who have represented more than one nation
