= Rubén Gotay =

Puerto Rican baseball player (born 1982)

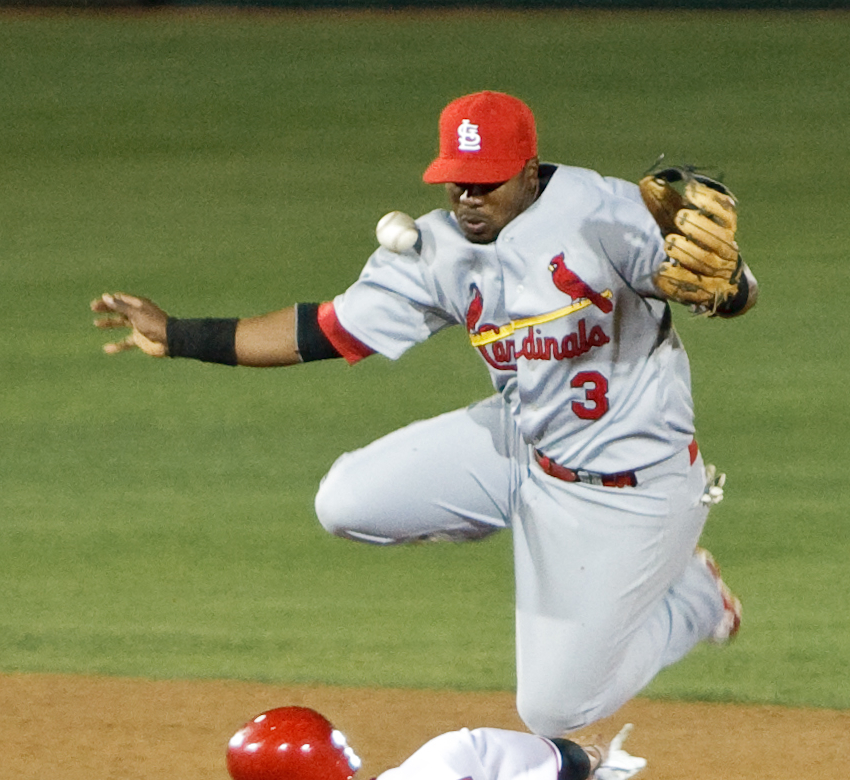
- Gotay with the St. Louis Cardinals
- Second baseman / Third baseman
- Born: December 25, 1982 (age 43); Río Piedras, Puerto Rico
- Batted: Switch Threw: Right

MLB debut
- August 3, 2004, for the Kansas City Royals

Last appearance
- September 28, 2008, for the Atlanta Braves

MLB statistics
- Batting average: .255
- Home runs: 12
- Runs batted in: 77
- Stats at Baseball Reference

Teams
- Kansas City Royals (2004–2006); New York Mets (2007); Atlanta Braves (2008)

Ruben Antonio Gotay (/ɡoʊˈtaɪ/ goh-TY; born December 25, 1982) is a Puerto Rican former professional baseball infielder. He played in Major League Baseball (MLB) from 2004 to 2008 with the Kansas City Royals, New York Mets and Atlanta Braves. He currently serves the hitting coach for the Augusta GreenJackets.

== Professional career ==
=== Kansas City Royals ===
Gotay made his major league debut with the Kansas City Royals on August 4, 2004, when they played the Chicago White Sox. He went 1-for-3 and got his first major league hit off José Contreras. Gotay played in 44 games for the Royals in 2004. He hit .270 with one home run and 16 RBI. In 2005, Gotay made the Royals' opening day roster and played in 86 major league games. He batted .227 with five home runs and 29 RBI.

Gotay spent the entire 2006 season in the minor leagues.

=== New York Mets ===
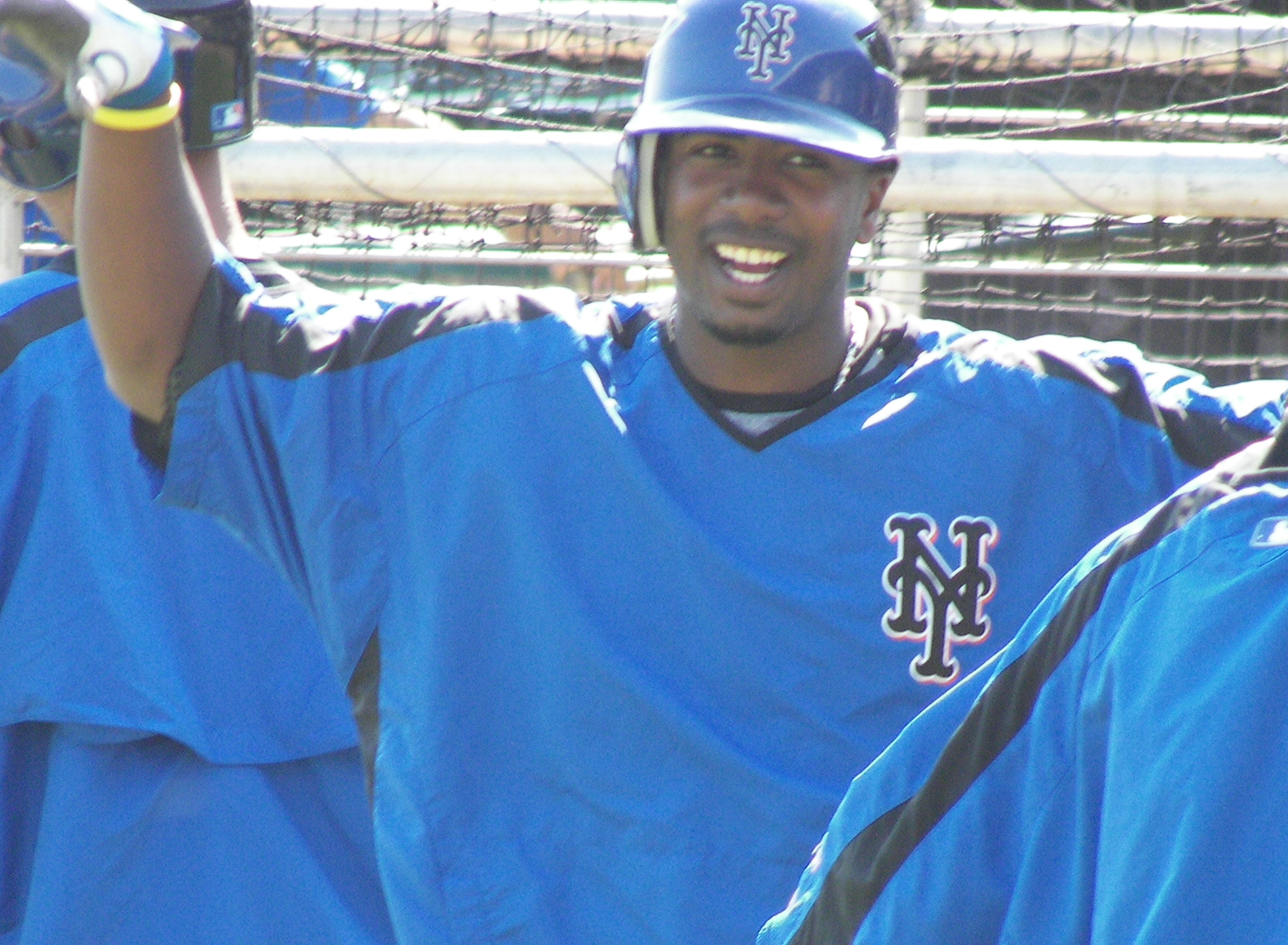
Gotay during his time with the Mets in 2007.

He was traded to the New York Mets for prospect Jeff Keppinger on July 19, 2006.

Gotay was designated for assignment by the Mets to make room on the 40-man roster for Chan Ho Park in February 2007.

Gotay cleared waivers and was assigned outright to the New Orleans Zephyrs of the Pacific Coast League on February 16, 2007 but was brought back to the major league club on April 30, 2007, after an injury to José Valentín. On May 9, 2007, Gotay hit his first home run as a Met off San Francisco Giants starting pitcher Matt Morris, the ball barely clearing the high right field wall at AT&T Park. On March 27, 2008, Gotay was placed on waivers by the Mets.

=== Atlanta Braves ===
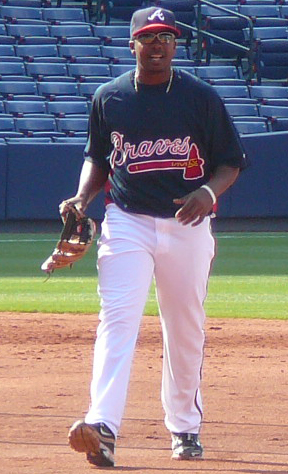
Gotay with the Atlanta Braves in 2008.

Gotay was claimed off waivers from the Mets on March 28, 2008, and hit his first home run for Atlanta on June 21. Gotay occasionally pinch hit, but rarely started for the Braves.

=== Pittsburgh Pirates ===
In February 2009, Gotay signed a minor league contract with the Pittsburgh Pirates.

=== Arizona Diamondbacks ===
On April 4, 2009, Gotay's contract was sold to the Arizona Diamondbacks and was assigned to Triple-A Reno. In November 2009 Gotay Filed For Free Agency.

=== St. Louis Cardinals ===
On November 30, 2009, Gotay signed a minor league contract with the St. Louis Cardinals with an invitation to Spring training.

=== Florida Marlins ===
On December 2, 2010, Gotay signed a minor league contract with the Florida Marlins. He was later released by the Marlins organization.

=== Return to Atlanta ===
Gotay signed a minor league contract with the Atlanta Braves on June 19, 2011.

=== Toronto Blue Jays ===
Gotay was signed by the Toronto Blue Jays on March 14, 2012.

=== Cincinnati Reds ===
Gotay signed a minor league contract with the Cincinnati Reds on December 18, 2013. He became a free agent after the 2014 season.

=== Saraperos de Saltillo ===
On April 3, 2015, Gotay signed with the Saraperos de Saltillo of the Mexican League. In three games for Saltillo, he went 2-for-8 (.250) with no home runs and three RBI. Gotay was released by the Saraperos on April 16.

Gotay re-signed with Saltillo on April 1, 2016. In four games for the team, he went 3-for-16 (.188) with one home run and two RBI. Gotay was released by the Saraperos on April 7.

=== Long Island Ducks ===
On May 16, 2016, Gotay signed with the Long Island Ducks of the Atlantic League of Professional Baseball. In 107 appearances for the Ducks, he batted .276/.372/.388 with seven home runs and 63 RBI. Gotay became a free agent after the season.

Gotay re-signed with Long Island on June 10, 2017. In 69 games for the team, he hit .261/.391/.381 with six home runs, 28 RBI, and three stolen bases.

== Coaching career ==
=== Philadelphia Phillies ===
In 2018, the Philadelphia Phillies hired Gotay to be a coach for their High-A affiliate, the Clearwater Threshers.

=== Pittsburgh Pirates ===
Gotay was hired as a coach for the Indianapolis Indians, the Triple-A affiliate of the Pittsburgh Pirates, for the 2023 season.

=== Atlanta Braves ===
On January 26, 2025, Gotay was named hitting coach of the Augusta GreenJackets, the Single-A affiliate of the Atlanta Braves, for the 2025 season.

In 2026, Gotay was named as a coach of the Gwinnett Stripers, the Triple-A affiliate of the Atlanta Braves for the 2026 season.

== Personal ==
His uncle is former major leaguer Julio Gotay. Gotay played little league in Fajardo Puerto Rico where his father Rubén Gotay was the head coach of the Pumas.
