= Nate Field =

American baseball player (born 1975)

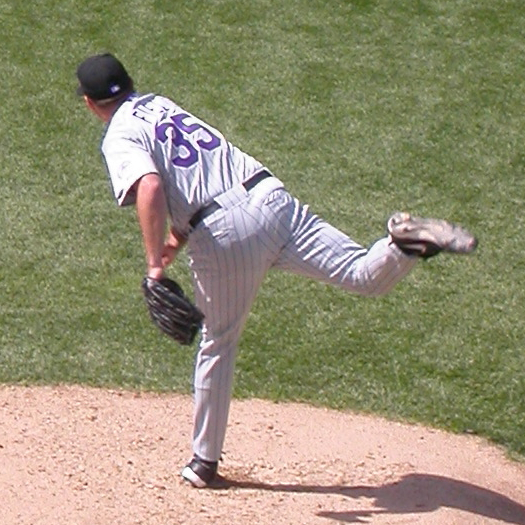
- Relief pitcher
- Born: December 11, 1975 (age 49); Denver, Colorado, U.S.
- Batted: Right Threw: Right

MLB debut
- April 12, 2002, for the Kansas City Royals

Last MLB appearance
- April 29, 2007, for the Florida Marlins

MLB statistics
- Win–loss record: 4–5
- Earned run average: 5.13
- Strikeouts: 72
- Stats at Baseball Reference

Teams
- Kansas City Royals (2002–2005); Colorado Rockies (2006); Florida Marlins (2007)
Medals
Men's baseball
Representing United States
Baseball World Cup
Gold medal – first place	2009 Nettuno	National team

Nathan Patrick Field (born December 11, 1975) is an American former professional baseball scout for the Boston Red Sox, a member of Boston's professional scouting department, and a former relief pitcher in Major League Baseball. He bats and throws right-handed.

== Collegiate career ==
Field played college baseball at Fort Hays State University in Hays, Kansas. He played two seasons (1997–98), earning Rocky Mountain Athletic Conference (RMAC) Pitcher of the Year honors in his senior season. He was a two-time All-RMAC First Team selection and a First Team All-American in 1998. He owns the career record for saves at FHSU with 23, and recorded 55 strikeouts and a 2.77 ERA in 48.2 innings of work over two seasons.

In 2009 Field was named to the RMAC All-Time Baseball Team, in celebration of the 100th anniversary of the conference.

He played his 1st 2 years at Barton County Community College in Great Bend, KS and was elected to their hall of fame.

== Professional career ==
Field was signed by the Montreal Expos as an amateur free agent on June 11, 1998. After two years in the Expos organization, Field was released and signed with the Sioux Falls Canaries of the independent Northern League. The Kansas City Royals purchased his contract on June 29, 2000 and spent the next two years in the Royals minor league system. Field made his major league debut on April 12, 2002, appearing in 5 games, before being claimed off waivers by the New York Yankees on June 12. Field appeared in 21 games for the Yankees Triple-A affiliate, the Columbus Clippers before becoming a free agent at the end of the season. On January 6, 2003, Field signed back with the Royals, appearing in 69 games over the next three years, and becoming a free agent after the 2005 season.

On December 21, 2005, Field signed with the Colorado Rockies, appeared in 14 games, and became a free agent at the end of the season. Field signed with the Florida Marlins on January 4, 2007, appearing in one game on April 29. Field spent the rest of the year playing for the Marlins Triple-A affiliate, the Albuquerque Isotopes. After filing for free agency after the season, Field signed a minor league contract with an invitation to spring training with the New York Mets on December 12, 2007, but did not make the team and pitched for the Triple-A New Orleans Zephyrs becoming a free agent at the end of the season. In February 2009, he signed a minor league contract with the Florida Marlins. In 2009 Field returned to the New Orleans Zephyrs, this time as a Marlins farmhand.
