= Darrell May =

American baseball player (born 1972)

- Pitcher
- Born: June 13, 1972 (age 53); San Bernardino, California, U.S.
- Batted: Left Threw: Left

Professional debut
- MLB: September 10, 1995, for the Atlanta Braves
- NPB: May 24, 1998, for the Hanshin Tigers

Last appearance
- NPB: September 26, 2001, for the Hanshin Tigers
- MLB: July 15, 2005, for the New York Yankees

MLB statistics
- Win–loss record: 26–43
- Earned run average: 5.16
- Strikeouts: 414

NPB statistics
- Win–loss record: 32–31
- Earned run average: 3.67
- Strikeouts: 540
- Stats at Baseball Reference

Teams
- Atlanta Braves (1995); Pittsburgh Pirates (1996); California / Anaheim Angels (1996–1997); Hanshin Tigers (1998–1999); Yomiuri Giants (2000–2001); Kansas City Royals (2002–2004); San Diego Padres (2005); New York Yankees (2005)

Darrell Kevin May (born June 13, 1972) is an American former professional baseball starting pitcher.

== Career ==
May's professional baseball career began when the Atlanta Braves drafted him in the 46th round of the 1992 Major League Baseball draft.

May spent parts of three seasons in the Major Leagues with the Braves, Pirates, and Angels, before being sold to the Hanshin Tigers of Japan's Central League in 1998.

May spent four seasons in Japan, two each with the Hanshin Tigers and the Yomiuri Giants. In 2001, he had his best season with 12 wins and a 2.95 ERA, and finished third in MVP balloting. Royals' General Manager Allard Baird, on a scouting trip in September 2001, was impressed by May's performance and signed him to a 1-year contract.

May struggled in 2002, but the Royals re-signed him for 2003. May responded by going 10–8 with a 3.77 ERA and leading the team in wins, ERA, innings pitched, strikeouts, complete games and games started.

== Coaching career ==
Darrel May currently coaches high school baseball.
