= Alberto Castillo (catcher) =

Dominican baseball player (born 1970)

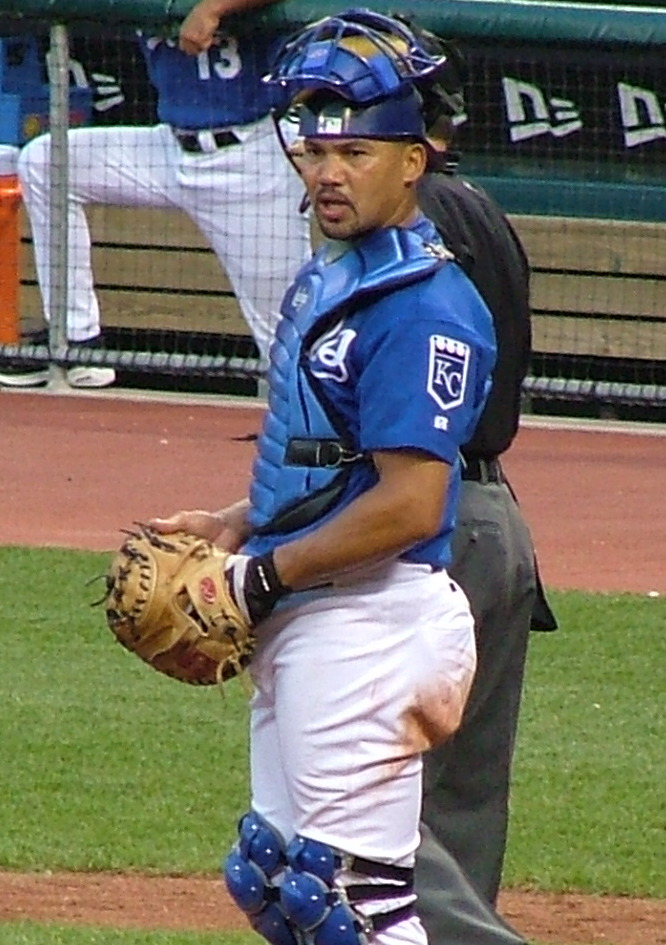
- Castillo with the Kansas City Royals in 2004
- Catcher
- Born: February 10, 1970 (age 56); San Juan de la Maguana, Dominican Republic
- Batted: Right Threw: Right

MLB debut
- May 28, 1995, for the New York Mets

Last MLB appearance
- June 21, 2007, for the Baltimore Orioles

MLB statistics
- Batting average: .220
- Home runs: 12
- Runs batted in: 101
- Stats at Baseball Reference

Teams
- New York Mets (1995–1998); St. Louis Cardinals (1999); Toronto Blue Jays (2000–2001); New York Yankees (2002); San Francisco Giants (2003); Kansas City Royals (2004–2005); Oakland Athletics (2005); Baltimore Orioles (2007)

Alberto Terrero Castillo (born February 10, 1970) is a Dominican former professional baseball catcher. Castillo was born in San Juan de la Maguana, Dominican Republic. Between 1995 and 2007, Castillo played for the New York Mets (1995–1998), St. Louis Cardinals (1999), Toronto Blue Jays (2000–2001), San Francisco Giants (2003), Kansas City Royals (2004–2005), Oakland Athletics (2005), and Baltimore Orioles (2007). He batted and threw right-handed.

In a twelve-season career, Castillo posted a .220 batting average with 12 home runs and 101 RBI in 418 games played.

== Career ==
During his time with the Mets, Castillo helped end one of the longest scoreless opening day games in MLB history. On March 31, 1998, he hit a full-count, two-out, pinch-hit single to right with the bases loaded in the bottom of the 14th inning to help the Mets beat their division rival Philadelphia Phillies 1–0 at Shea Stadium.

On June 25, 1999, he was the catcher when St. Louis Cardinals rookie pitcher José Jiménez pitched a no-hitter, and Castillo also had one of the team's five hits in that game against Randy Johnson who also threw a complete game.

Signed by the Washington Nationals on December 13, 2005, Castillo played the 2006 season with the Triple-A New Orleans Zephyrs. He finished his 2006 season with the Zephyrs with a .268 batting average and 30 RBI. Castillo was a catcher for the first Dominican team in the inaugural 2006 World Baseball Classic.

The Boston Red Sox organization signed him to a minor league contract on December 20, 2006, and invited him to participate in the Red Sox' 2007 spring training.

On March 27, 2007, the Red Sox traded him to the Baltimore Orioles for minor league outfielder Cory Keylor.

He was used in the 2007 season by the Orioles to fill in for injured catcher Ramón Hernández twice and was designated for assignment twice after Hernandez's return. Castillo became a minor league free agent after the season. Castillo was the captain of the Dominican Team in the 2007 Caribbean Series.

On February 14, 2008, Castillo signed a minor league contract with the Houston Astros and was invited to spring training. After spending spring training with the Astros, Castillo was demoted on March 24 to the minors and later released. Confusingly, the Orioles signed a pitcher named Alberto Castillo at the beginning of the 2008 season.

On July 3, 2008, Castillo signed with the Camden Riversharks of the Atlantic League. In 2009, he played for the Newark Bears before being traded to the rival Long Island Ducks on July 6.

He is currently the catching instructor of the Dominican Summer League Mets.

== See also ==
- Rule 5 draft results
