= Paul Phillips (baseball) =

American baseball player (born 1977)

- Catcher
- Born: April 15, 1977 (age 49); Demopolis, Alabama, U.S.
- Batted: Right Threw: Right

MLB debut
- September 9, 2004, for the Kansas City Royals

Last MLB appearance
- October 3, 2010, for the Colorado Rockies

MLB statistics
- Batting average: .262
- Home runs: 3
- Runs batted in: 26
- Stats at Baseball Reference

Teams
- Kansas City Royals (2004–2007); Chicago White Sox (2008); Colorado Rockies (2009–2010)

Paul Anthony Phillips (born April 15, 1977) is a former American professional baseball catcher. He attended the University of Alabama. He is a first cousin of infielder Andy Phillips.

== Career ==
Phillips was originally drafted by the Kansas City Royals in the 59th round (1,519th overall) of the 1995 Major League Baseball draft, but he did not sign. A year later, he was drafted for a second time by the Houston Astros in the 25th round (744th overall) of the 1996 Major League Baseball draft, and again, Phillips did not sign. Another two years later, Phillips was drafted again by the Royals in the ninth round (257th overall) of the 1998 Major League Baseball draft, and he signed with the team. He spent eight years in the Royals organization, and made his major league debut on September 9, 2004, going 1-for-2 and recording a single in his first at-bat against the Detroit Tigers. He became a minor league free agent after the 2007 season.

Phillips signed a minor league contract with the Chicago White Sox on January 11, 2008. After spending the entire season with the Triple-A Charlotte Knights, he was called up to the majors on September 1.

He became a free agent at the end of the season and signed with the Colorado Rockies in January 2009. In November 2009, Phillips was granted free agency after being outrighted off of the Rockies' 40-man roster. He later re-signed with the Rockies on a minor league contract on November 20, 2009. Phillips became a free agent after the 2010 season, and he signed a minor league contract with the Cleveland Indians on December 8, 2010.

He signed a minor league contract with the Milwaukee Brewers on January 11, 2012, and retired soon after, becoming a coach at Lipscomb University.
