= Jaime Cerda =

American baseball player (born 1978)

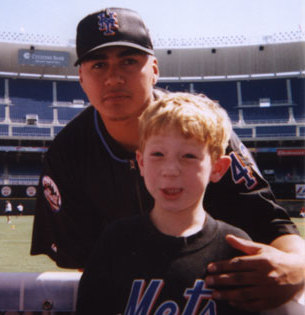
- Cerda poses with a fan while with the Mets
- Pitcher
- Born: October 26, 1978 (age 47); Fresno, California, U.S.
- Batted: Left Threw: Left

MLB debut
- June 28, 2002, for the New York Mets

Last MLB appearance
- May 25, 2005, for the Kansas City Royals

MLB statistics
- Win–loss record: 3–9
- Earned run average: 4.26
- Strikeouts: 91
- Stats at Baseball Reference

Former teams
- New York Mets (2002–2003); Kansas City Royals (2004–2005)

Jaime Magana Cerda (born October 26, 1978) is a retired left-handed Major League Baseball relief pitcher. Cerda played previously with the New York Mets (2002–2003) and the Kansas City Royals (2004–2005). Cerda, who is of Mexican descent, played with the Tacoma Rainiers, the Triple-A affiliate of the Seattle Mariners, in 2007, but was released due to his high ERA.

Cerda graduated from Selma High School in California in 1996. He was drafted by the New York Mets in the 23rd round of the 1998 major league baseball draft out of Fresno City Community College.

Cerda is married.
