= 1976 in baseball =

The following are the baseball events of the year 1976 throughout the world.

== Champions ==
=== Major League Baseball ===
- World Series: Cincinnati Reds over New York Yankees (4-0); Johnny Bench, MVP

League Championship Series (ALCS, NLCS)
East	NY Yankees	3
West	Kansas City	2
East	Philadelphia	0
West	Cincinnati	3

World Series
AL	NY Yankees	0
NL	Cincinnati	4

- All-Star Game, July 13 at Veterans Stadium: National League, 7-1; George Foster, MVP

=== Other champions ===
- Amateur World Series: Cuba
- College World Series: Arizona
- Japan Series: Hankyu Braves over Yomiuri Giants (4-3)
- Big League World Series: Taipei, Taiwan
- Little League World Series: Chofu, Tokyo, Japan
- Senior League World Series: Pingtung, Taiwan

Winter Leagues

- 1976 Caribbean Series: Naranjeros de Hermosillo
- Dominican Republic League: Águilas Cibaeñas
- Mexican Pacific League: Naranjeros de Hermosillo
- Puerto Rican League: Vaqueros de Bayamón
- Venezuelan League: Tigres de Aragua

== Awards and honors ==
- Baseball Hall of Fame
  - Oscar Charleston
  - Roger Connor
  - Bob Lemon
  - Freddie Lindstrom
  - Robin Roberts
  - Cal Hubbard (umpire)

Baseball Writers' Association of America Awards
BBWAA Award	National League	American League
Rookie of the Year	Butch Metzger (SD); Pat Zachry (CIN)	Mark Fidrych (DET)
Cy Young Award	Randy Jones (SD)	Jim Palmer (BAL)
Most Valuable Player	Joe Morgan (CIN)	Thurman Munson (NYY)
Babe Ruth Award (World Series MVP)	Johnny Bench (CIN)	—
Gold Glove Awards
Position	National League	American League
Pitcher	Jim Kaat (PHI)	Jim Palmer (BAL)
Catcher	Johnny Bench (CIN)	Jim Sundberg (TEX)
1st Base	Steve Garvey (LAD)	George Scott (MIL)
2nd Base	Joe Morgan (CIN)	Bobby Grich (BAL)
3rd Base	Mike Schmidt (PHI)	Aurelio Rodríguez (DET)
Shortstop	Dave Concepción (CIN)	Mark Belanger (BAL)
Outfield	César Cedeño (HOU)	Dwight Evans (BOS)
Outfield	César Gerónimo (CIN)	Rick Manning (CLE)
Outfield	Garry Maddox (PHI)	Joe Rudi (OAK)

== Statistical leaders ==
	American League		National League	
Stat	Player	Total	Player	Total
AVG	George Brett (KC)	.333	Bill Madlock (CHC)	.339
HR	Graig Nettles (NYY)	32	Mike Schmidt (PHI)	38
RBI	Lee May (BAL)	109	George Foster (CIN)	121
W	Jim Palmer (BAL)	22	Randy Jones (SD)	22
ERA	Mark Fidrych (DET)	2.34	John Denny (STL)	2.52
K	Nolan Ryan (CAL)	327	Tom Seaver (NYM)	235

== Major league baseball final standings ==
=== American League final standings ===
AL East
Team	W	L	Pct.	GB	Home	Road
^{(1)} New York Yankees	97	62	.610	—	45‍–‍35	52‍–‍27
Baltimore Orioles	88	74	.543	10½	42‍–‍39	46‍–‍35
Boston Red Sox	83	79	.512	15½	46‍–‍35	37‍–‍44
Cleveland Indians	81	78	.509	16	44‍–‍35	37‍–‍43
Detroit Tigers	74	87	.460	24	36‍–‍44	38‍–‍43
Milwaukee Brewers	66	95	.410	32	36‍–‍45	30‍–‍50

AL West
Team	W	L	Pct.	GB	Home	Road
^{(2)} Kansas City Royals	90	72	.556	—	49‍–‍32	41‍–‍40
Oakland Athletics	87	74	.540	2½	51‍–‍30	36‍–‍44
Minnesota Twins	85	77	.525	5	44‍–‍37	41‍–‍40
Texas Rangers	76	86	.469	14	39‍–‍42	37‍–‍44
California Angels	76	86	.469	14	38‍–‍43	38‍–‍43
Chicago White Sox	64	97	.398	25½	35‍–‍45	29‍–‍52

Locations of teams for the 1976 American League season
West East

=== National League final standings ===
NL East
Team	W	L	Pct.	GB	Home	Road
^{(2)} Philadelphia Phillies	101	61	.623	—	53‍–‍28	48‍–‍33
Pittsburgh Pirates	92	70	.568	9	47‍–‍34	45‍–‍36
New York Mets	86	76	.531	15	45‍–‍37	41‍–‍39
Chicago Cubs	75	87	.463	26	42‍–‍39	33‍–‍48
St. Louis Cardinals	72	90	.444	29	37‍–‍44	35‍–‍46
Montreal Expos	55	107	.340	46	27‍–‍53	28‍–‍54

NL West
Team	W	L	Pct.	GB	Home	Road
^{(1)} Cincinnati Reds	102	60	.630	—	49‍–‍32	53‍–‍28
Los Angeles Dodgers	92	70	.568	10	49‍–‍32	43‍–‍38
Houston Astros	80	82	.494	22	46‍–‍36	34‍–‍46
San Francisco Giants	74	88	.457	28	40‍–‍41	34‍–‍47
San Diego Padres	73	89	.451	29	42‍–‍38	31‍–‍51
Atlanta Braves	70	92	.432	32	34‍–‍47	36‍–‍45

Locations of teams for the 1971–1976 National League seasons
West East

== Nippon Professional Baseball final standings ==
=== Central League final standings ===
Central League
Team	G	W	L	T	Pct.	GB
Yomiuri Giants	130	76	45	9	.628	–
Hanshin Tigers	130	72	45	13	.615	2.0
Hiroshima Toyo Carp	130	61	58	11	.513	14.0
Chunichi Dragons	130	54	66	10	.450	21.5
Yakult Swallows	130	52	68	10	.433	23.5
Taiyo Whales	130	45	78	7	.366	32.0

=== Pacific League final standings ===
Pacific League
Team	G	W	L	T	Pct.	1st half ranking	2nd half ranking
Hankyu Braves	130	79	45	6	.637	1	1
Nankai Hawks	130	71	56	3	.559	2	2
Lotte Orions	130	63	56	11	.529	3	3
Kintetsu Buffaloes	130	57	66	7	.463	5	4
Nippon-Ham Fighters	130	52	67	11	.437	4	5
Taiheiyo Club Lions	130	44	76	10	.367	6	6

== Events ==
=== January ===
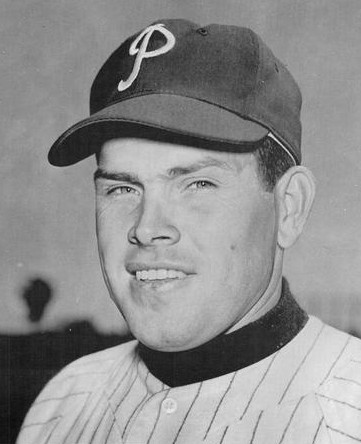
Robin Roberts in 1961

- January 2 – Pitchers Robin Roberts and Bob Lemon are voted into the Hall of Fame by the Baseball Writers' Association of America.
- January 9 – San Francisco Giants owner Horace Stoneham agrees to sell his team for USD $13.25 million to a Toronto group consisting of Labatt Brewing Company, Vulcan Assets Ltd., and Canadian Imperial Bank of Commerce. The sale price includes $5 million that is set aside to cover indemnification costs for relocating the financially strapped franchise from San Francisco. If the sale and transfer is approved by ten of the National League's 12 teams, the Toronto Giants would begin play this season at Exhibition Stadium.
- January 14 – Ted Turner completes the purchase for full control (100 percent) ownership of the Atlanta Braves.
- January 15 – Seattle is awarded the American League's 13th franchise to begin play in 1977. On February 6, the club's ownership structure is revealed, with entertainer Danny Kaye and Seattle businessman Lester Smith as principals. The owners pay the AL an entry fee of $5.53 million.
- January 27 – The Pittsburgh Pirates sign undrafted free agent Pascual Perez.

=== February ===
- February 3 – The Special Veterans Committee selects players Roger Connor and Freddie Lindstrom, and umpire Cal Hubbard, for the Hall of Fame. Hubbard becomes the first person elected to both the Pro Football and Baseball Halls of Fame.
- February 9 – Oscar Charleston is selected for the Hall of Fame by the Special Committee on the Negro Leagues.
- February 11 – The transfer of the Giants to Toronto is thwarted when, after a Superior Court judge issues an injunction sought by San Francisco mayor George Moscone, the franchise is tentatively sold to Bay Area real estate developer Bob Lurie and controversial former MLB owner Bob Short for $8 million. Under the arrangement, each man will own half the team. Short is notorious for having moved the Washington Senators to Arlington, Texas, in 1971 after refusing to pay two years of rent he owed for the capital's district-owned stadium.
- February 17 – Mike Scott of Pepperdine pitches a perfect game against California Lutheran University. He will be selected in the 2nd round of the June draft.

=== March ===
- March 1 – The 1976 Major League Baseball lockout is instated, the second lockout in league history.
- March 2:
  - The National League unanimously approves the sale of the San Francisco Giants. The majority owner is Bay Area financier Bob Lurie, with Arizona meat-packing tycoon Arthur "Bud" Herseth emerging in the eleventh hour as Lurie's minority partner as a replacement for Bob Short. The reported purchase price is $8 million. The transaction finally ends Horace Stoneham's term as the Giants' owner after 40 years.
  - Lurie immediately appoints Bill Rigney, 58, as the Giants' field manager for 1976. It will be Rigney's second term in the job: he was the skipper when the franchise moved from New York to San Francisco in 1958, and compiled a 332–342 (.493) record from 1956 to June 17, 1960.
  - The St. Louis Cardinals trade second baseman Ted Sizemore to the Los Angeles Dodgers for outfielder Willie Crawford. The deal restores Sizemore to his original team where he won the 1969 National League Rookie of the Year Award.
- March 3 – The Boston Red Sox unexpectedly trade relief pitcher Dick Drago to the California Angels for infielder Dave Machemer and outfielders John Balaz and Dick Sharon. Drago had been a major contributor to the Red Sox' 1975 pennant; Machemer, Balaz and Sharon never appear in a Boston uniform.
- March 16 – Andy Messersmith and Dave McNally are officially granted free agency as a result of the December 1975 Seitz decision that struck down the reserve clause.
- March 17 – Major League Baseball's lockout ends as Commissioner of Baseball Bowie Kuhn orders team owners to open spring training camps to their players immediately.
- March 20 – Leo Durocher, hired to manage Japan's Yokohama Taiyō Whales of the Central League, is sick with hepatitis and asks for a five-week delay in reporting. Durocher receives a telegram from the Whales stating: "Since the championship starts in 20 days, it's better if you stay home and take care of yourself for the remainder of the season."
- March 26 – The American League officially expands to 14 teams for 1977, approving the purchase of the new Toronto franchise by the Labatt Brewing Company for $7 million. In January, the Junior Circuit added Seattle as its 13th team, then, on March 20, its owners voted 11–1 to draft the Toronto territory.

=== April ===
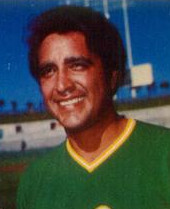
Mike Torrez

- April 2 – The coming of post-Seitz decision era free agency looms large in a major trade between the Oakland Athletics and Baltimore Orioles. Oakland deals outfielder Reggie Jackson and pitchers Ken Holtzman and minor leaguer Bill VanBommel to Baltimore for outfielder Don Baylor and pitchers Mike Torrez and Paul Mitchell. Jackson, Holtzman and Baylor will be free agents at the close of the 1976 season; Torrez will opt for free agency a year later.
- April 3 – The Chicago White Sox sign veteran free-agent outfielder Cleon Jones, released by the New York Mets on July 27, 1975. Jones will appear in 12 games for the White Sox, collect eight hits and five bases on balls in 47 plate appearances, and be unconditionally released on May 2.
- April 8 – The Cincinnati Reds begin defense of their world championship by thrashing the Houston Astros 11–5 in the National League's traditional opening game at Riverfront Stadium. The "Big Red Machine" hits no homers, but steals four bases off pitchers J. R. Richard and Elias Sosa. Houston's Joaquín Andújar makes his major league debut as a mop-up man. He will later become a starting pitcher and twice in his career win 20 games or more in a season.
- April 9 – In a classic Opening Day pitchers' duel between future Hall of Famers Jim Palmer of the Baltimore Orioles and Ferguson Jenkins of the Boston Red Sox, who will combine for 552 major league wins, Palmer prevails 1–0.
- April 10:
  - The Atlanta Braves sign free agent pitcher Andy Messersmith to a "lifetime contract" worth $1 million.
  - Don Money of the Milwaukee Brewers hits what appears to be a game winning grand slam off Dave Pagan of the New York Yankees. However, just before the pitch, Yankee first baseman Chris Chambliss had called time. The grand slam is waived off, and Money is ordered to return to the plate. Money then hits a sacrifice fly to bring the score to 9–7. It's not enough and the Brewers lose the game; they later also lose a protest they file with the American League.
- April 14 – At Wrigley Field, Dave Kingman of the New York Mets launches a home run estimated at 550 feet that plunks a house some 530 feet from home plate, but the Chicago Cubs survive to win 6–5.
- April 15 – Newly remodeled Yankee Stadium is jammed with 52,613 fans for Opening Day ceremonies. The 1923 Yankees, the first team to play in "The [original] House That Ruth Built," are honored, and Bob Shawkey, winner of the 1923 opener, throws out the first ball. The Yankees beat the Minnesota Twins 11–4 on 14 hits, but the only home run is hit by Minnesota's Dan Ford.
- April 16 – At Atlanta–Fulton County Stadium, Los Angeles Dodgers southpaw Tommy John throws a pitch in an official MLB game for the first time since Dr. Frank Jobe performed his breakthrough ulnar collateral ligament reconstruction surgery on John's injured elbow on September 25, 1974. John faces 24 Atlanta Braves hitters over five innings, and allows five hits, four bases on balls, and three earned runs, absorbing a 3–1 defeat. But he will throw 207 innings in 1976, go 10–10 (3.09), and play 14 more major-league seasons before retiring from the mound at age 46 in 1989. Moreover, he will achieve a measure of immortality when Jobe's procedure is christened "Tommy John Surgery."
- April 17 – With the wind blowing out at Wrigley Field, Mike Schmidt leads the Philadelphia Phillies assault with a single, four consecutive home runs, and eight RBI to overcome a 12–1 deficit after three innings and beat the Chicago Cubs in 10 innings, 18–16. Schmidt becomes the tenth player in Major League history to hit four home runs in a game.
- April 18 – Seattle's American League expansion team names Lou Gorman vice president and its first director of baseball operations. Gorman, 47, comes from the Kansas City Royals, where he oversaw the former expansion club's player development and scouting organizations before becoming assistant general manager.
- April 19 – At Busch Memorial Stadium, the New York Mets and St. Louis Cardinals take 17 innings to decide a game that the Mets win, 4–3, on Del Unser's solo homer off southpaw reliever Mike Wallace.
- April 21:
  - At Wrigley Field, Tim Foli of the Montreal Expos hits for the cycle, but it takes him two days to do it. Foli has a single, double and triple against the Cubs, but with the Expos ahead 11–3, the game is suspended on account of darkness. When play resumes the next day, Foli will add a home run in the eighth inning.
  - In another early-season marathon contest, the Houston Astros down the Los Angeles Dodgers in 16 innings, 1–0 at the Astrodome. J. R. Richard, Ken Forsch and Mike Barlow combine for the shutout, with Barlow claiming the "W".
- April 25
  - Chicago Cubs outfielder Rick Monday snatches an American flag from two fans who are about to set it on fire in the outfield during a game at Dodger Stadium. The Dodgers win 5–4 in 10 innings. The next day, the Illinois legislature unanimously approves May 4 as Rick Monday Day.
  - The Atlanta Braves top the Philadelphia Phillies 3–2, as Darrell Evans draws a walk in his 13th consecutive game to set a new National League record. He'll draw passes in two more games, until April 27, before being shut out. Evans has 19 walks in the 15 games.
- April 28 – The St. Louis Cardinals prevail in another extra-inning contest, scoring two runs in the top of the 16th, then holding off the San Francisco Giants 4–2 at Candlestick Park. Rookie Doug Clarey provides the winning margin with his two-run homer off Mike Caldwell; the long ball will be Clarey's only major-league hit.

=== May ===
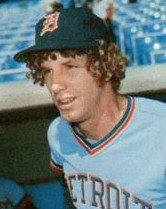
Mark Fidrych

- May 1 – In the first game of a double-header and the Phillies 15th tilt of the season, Mike Schmidt hits his 12th home run of 1976, setting an MLB record for the most homers in a team's first 15 games.
- May 2 – In a 16-inning affair, the last-place (in the National League East) Montreal Expos score four runs in the top of the 16th, then hold the first-place (in the National League West) Cincinnati Reds scoreless in the home half to claim an 8–4 triumph at Riverfront Stadium. Barry Foote and Pepe Mangual provide clutch two-RBI hits, while reliever Don Stanhouse (later famed as "Stan the Man Unusual" as a Baltimore Oriole) gets the victory.
- May 5 – The "Friendly Confines of Wrigley Field" play host to another slugfest as the Los Angeles Dodgers outlast the Chicago Cubs 14–12. The Dodgers belt seven home runs, and the Cubs rap 21 base hits.
- May 12 – Prized free-agent Andy Messersmith of the Atlanta Braves sees his record fall to 0–4 (5.11 earned run average) with a 6–3 loss to the visiting New York Mets.
- May 15 – Mark Fidrych of the Detroit Tigers wins his first major league start, a complete game two-hit 2–1 victory over the Cleveland Indians. Soon to be famous in the baseball world as "The Bird," Fidrych holds the Indians hitless for six innings, talks to the ball, and tamps down the mound before toeing the rubber each inning.
- May 16 – The Kansas City Royals pick up left-hander Larry Gura, 28, in a trade with the New York Yankees for backup catcher Fran Healy. Currently 15–16 in 68 games for the Yanks and Chicago Cubs, Gura will become an effective member of the Royals' starting rotation, winning 111 games (and losing only 78) for them until he's released on May 18, 1985.
- May 17 – The Montreal Expos trade pitcher Steve Renko and outfielder Larry Biittner to the Chicago Cubs for first baseman André Thornton.
- May 18:
  - The 17–10 New York Yankees score five runs in the top of the ninth to force a six-all tie with the homestanding Cleveland Indians, then plate another five tallies in the 16th to topple the Tribe, 11–6, and increase their lead in the American League East to 3½ games over the Baltimore Orioles. Reliever Sparky Lyle fires six innings of three-hit, shutout ball to gain the victory.
  - The Yankees also obtain outfielder Carlos May from the Chicago White Sox for pitcher Ken Brett and outfielder Rich Coggins.
- May 19 – At Detroit, Carl Yastrzemski hits three home runs and goes 4-for-4 as the Boston Red Sox win 9–2 over the host Detroit Tigers. Yaz's big day comes one day after he passes Ted Williams as having played the most games in a Red Sox uniform.
- May 20 – At Yankee Stadium, the Boston Red Sox and the New York Yankees are involved in one of the ugliest on-field brawls in sports history. In the bottom of the 6th inning, New York's Lou Piniella crashes into Boston catcher Carlton Fisk in an attempt to score. Fisk and Piniella begin fighting at home plate and the benches clear. During the brawl, Bill Lee is thrown to the ground. As the fight appears to be subsiding, Yankee third baseman Graig Nettles punches Lee after the two exchange words, re-igniting the brawl. Lee suffers a separated shoulder from the melee and subsequently misses a significant portion of the 1976 season. He keeps pitching until 1982, but will never be the same pitcher after the brawl. The Red Sox win the game 8–2.
- May 22 – With four amateur umpires working the game—the regular, unionized National League crew was late to the park because they were reluctant to cross a Three Rivers Stadium picket line set up by striking vendors—the Pittsburgh Pirates and Chicago Cubs engage in another 16-inning tilt. Light-hitting Mario Mendoza (who gave his name to the "Mendoza line") drives in the winning tally with a sacrifice fly in the Pirates' 4–3 victory.
- May 24 – Bert Campaneris of the Oakland Athletics steals five bases in a 12–7 win over the Minnesota Twins.
- May 26 – Journeyman first baseman Terry Crowley returns to the Baltimore Orioles as a free agent after his release from the Atlanta Braves. His second stint in Baltimore lasts through the 1982 season, and he will become known as an ace pinch-hitter and as one of the subjects of a salty, not-meant-for-public-consumption Earl Weaver "Manager's Corner" radio interview.
- May 29 – The only home run hit by pitcher Joe Niekro in his 22-year career comes at the expense of brother Phil Niekro as the Houston Astros tie the Atlanta Braves in the seventh inning, then win 4–3.
- May 30 – Veteran right-hander Jim Lonborg of the Philadelphia Phillies improves to 8–0 with a complete-game, 7–1 victory over the Montreal Expos at Veterans Stadium.

=== June ===
- June 1:
  - In another trade driven by the demise of the reserve clause, the Minnesota Twins deal staff ace and future Hall-of-Fame right-hander Bert Blyleven and infielder Danny Thompson to the Texas Rangers for pitchers Bill Singer and Jim Gideon, shortstop Roy Smalley III, third baseman Mike Cubbage, and $250,000. Blyleven has won 99 games for the Twins since his June 1970 debut, but with his looming free agency, Twins' owner Calvin Griffith has already permitted the 25-year-old former All-Star hurler to negotiate a $550,000 contract with the Rangers two days before the trade is finalized. Coveted youngster Smalley, 23, is the nephew of Twins' manager Gene Mauch.
  - Earlier, with Singer starting on the mound for them and lasting 51/3 innings, the Rangers go 16 innings to defeat the Chicago White Sox, 6–5, at Comiskey Park. Chicago manager Paul Richards files an unsuccessful protest to the American League, claiming Singer is an ineligible player.
- June 3 – The Boston Red Sox trade outfielder Bernie Carbo, who months earlier had starred for the team in the 1975 World Series, to the Milwaukee Brewers for pitcher Tom Murphy and outfielder Bobby Darwin.
- June 4 – Tom Seaver and the New York Mets defeat the Dodgers 11–0 in Los Angeles on a three home run performance by Dave Kingman. Kingman also sets a Met record with eight RBIs in a single game.
- June 8 – Left-hander Floyd Bannister is selected first overall by the Houston Astros in the 1976 June amateur draft, but the Detroit Tigers enjoy the most fruitful harvest, selecting shortstop Alan Trammell (second round) and right-handed pitchers Dan Petry (fourth round) and Jack Morris (fifth round)—all future stars of their 1984 world champions.
- June 10 – The Tigers purchase the contract of 26-year-old veteran pitcher Milt Wilcox from the Chicago Cubs. Morris, Petry and Wilcox will eventually form the "big three" starting rotation of the 1984 Tigers.
- June 13 – The Atlanta Braves trade slugging third baseman Darrell Evans and shortstop Marty Perez to the San Francisco Giants for four players: first baseman Willie Montañez, second baseman Mike Eden, shortstop Craig Robinson and outfielder Jake Brown.
- June 14 – Jerry Terrell's third-inning single is the only hit that Rick Wise of the Boston Red Sox allows in his complete-game, 5–0 triumph over the Minnesota Twins at Metropolitan Stadium. It's Wise's third career one-hitter (he also fired a no-hitter in 1971) and the first of two one-hitters he will throw in June 1976 alone.
- June 15:
  - The New York Yankees and Baltimore Orioles—rivals in the American League East—pull off a ten-player trade that will reshape the Baltimore roster in the coming seasons. The Yankees trade pitchers Scott McGregor, Tippy Martinez, Rudy May and Dave Pagan and catcher Rick Dempsey to the Orioles for pitchers Doyle Alexander, Ken Holtzman, Grant Jackson and Jimmy Freeman and catcher Elrod Hendricks. Alexander, Holtzman and Jackson will prove key to the Yankees' 1976 pennant drive, but McGregor, Martinez and Dempsey will feature in the Orioles' lineup for the next decade, contributing to the O's 1979 AL pennant and 1983 world championship.
  - The Los Angeles Dodgers acquire slugging outfielder Reggie Smith from the St. Louis Cardinals for catcher/outfielder Joe Ferguson, outfielder Bob Detherage and minor-league first baseman Freddie Tisdale. Native Angeleno Smith will be a major piece of the Dodgers' 1977 and 1978 National League champions and their 1981 world champions, and make three NL All-Star teams in his 5½ years with the team.
  - The Houston Astros are "rained out" of their scheduled home game against the Pittsburgh Pirates at the Astrodome. Massive flooding in the Houston area prevents the umpires and all but a few fans from reaching the stadium. Despite both teams having taken pre-game practice, the absence of the umpiring crew forces the game to be called off.
  - At Tiger Stadium, the Kansas City Royals build a 20–0 lead through their half of the eighth, before Detroit scores seven runs in the home half. The score is 21–7 with none out in the Royals' ninth when rain washes out the remainder of the official contest. Kansas City strikes for 24 hits, with Tom Poquette getting five and George Brett four. Amos Otis gets five RBI and second baseman Dave Nelson four.
- June 18 – Peter Bavasi resigns as general manager of the San Diego Padres to become the first president of Toronto's expansion team, set to enter the American League in 1977. Peter is the son of longtime MLB executive and Padre president Buzzie Bavasi. Scouting and farm system director Bob Fontaine Sr. becomes the Padres' new general manager.
- June 22 – Randy Jones pitches the Padres to a 4–2 win over the San Francisco Giants, and ties Christy Mathewson's 63-year-old National League record by going 68 innings without a base on balls. Jones receives a standing ovation from the home crowd after striking out Darrell Evans to end the seventh inning. His streak ends when he walks Marc Hill leading off the 8th.
- June 23 – After 2½ seasons, one National League Cy Young Award, 194 games pitched and one pennant, iron-man relief pitcher Mike Marshall's tenure with the Los Angeles Dodgers ends when he is traded to the Atlanta Braves for pitcher Elias Sosa and infielder Lee Lacy.
- June 25 – The Texas Rangers' Toby Harrah becomes the only shortstop in major league history to go through an entire doubleheader without a fielding chance. At bat, Harrah makes up for the inactivity, collecting six hits including a grand slam in the opener, and another home run in game 2. The Rangers beat the Chicago White Sox in the first game 8–4, but lose the nightcap 14–9.
- June 28 – With a national television audience looking on, Detroit's rookie sensation, Mark Fidrych, now famous as "The Bird", beats the first-place New York Yankees 5–1 at Tiger Stadium. With his seventh straight victory, Fidrych improves his won–lost record to 8–1, lowers his ERA to 2.05, and throws his eighth complete game.
- June 29 – Rick Wise of the Boston Red Sox hurls his second one-hit, complete-game shutout in 15 days, defeating the Baltimore Orioles at Fenway Park, 2–0. Paul Blair's sixth-inning single is the Orioles' only safety.

==== Oakland fire sale ====
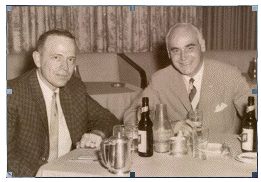
Charles O. Finley (right), with his cousin Carl (1962)

- Before the June 15, 1976, trading deadline, Oakland Athletics owner Charlie Finley, anticipating the impact of free agency, contacts the New York Yankees and Boston Red Sox. He proposes a trade to the Red Sox that involves Joe Rudi, Rollie Fingers, Vida Blue, Gene Tenace and Sal Bando in exchange for Fred Lynn, Carlton Fisk and minor league prospects. In trade talks with the Yankees, Finley proposes sending Blue to the Bronx for Thurman Munson along with either Roy White or Elliott Maddox. Finley also offers Rudi for Munson.
- On June 14, Finley is unable to make any trades. He starts contacting other teams about selling his players' contracts. Joe Rudi, Vida Blue, Don Baylor, and Gene Tenace are valued at $1 million each, while Sal Bando can be acquired for $500,000. Red Sox general manager Dick O'Connell is in Oakland, because the Red Sox are due to play the Athletics on June 15. Field manager Darrell Johnson has declared that he is interested in Rudi and Fingers. On June 15, the Red Sox purchase both contracts for $1 million each. Rudi and Fingers cross the field, put on Red Sox uniforms, and sit in the Boston dugout to watch the Athletics beat the Red Sox, 3–2, on Tenace's walk-off home run. In the end, Fingers never plays an official game for Boston; Rudi will appear in 49 games for the 1981 Red Sox and bat only .180.
- O'Connell contacts Detroit Tigers general manager Jim Campbell about purchasing Blue for $1 million to block the Yankees from getting him. Gabe Paul, president/general manager of the Yankees, tells Finley he will pay $1.5 million to acquire Blue, and Finley offers Blue a three-year extension worth $485,000 per season to make the sale more attractive to the Yankees. With the extension, the Yankees agree to purchase Blue.
- Finley also contacts Bill Veeck of the Chicago White Sox about purchasing Sal Bando and the Texas Rangers, who are interested in Don Baylor.
- On June 18, Commissioner of Baseball Bowie Kuhn voids the Rudi, Fingers and Blue transactions in the "best interests of baseball." Amid the turmoil, the A's will still finish second in the American League West, 2½ games behind the Kansas City Royals.

=== July ===
- July 4 – As the season nears its half-way point, at the culmination of U.S. Bicentennial holiday celebrations, MLB standings reveal one truly close pennant race. It's in the American League West, where the Kansas City Royals (46–29) lead the Texas Rangers (42–32) by 3½ games. The other divisions see the New York Yankees (46–27)—seeking their first postseason berth since 1964—lead the Cleveland Indians (37–36) by nine games in the American League East, the defending world champion Cincinnati Reds (48–31) ahead of the Los Angeles Dodgers (43–37) by 5½ in the National League West, and the Philadelphia Phillies (52–22, best in the majors) in front of the Pittsburgh Pirates (43–31) by nine lengths.
- July 8 – At Wrigley Field, Randy Jones wins his 16th game of the year for the San Diego Padres, a National League record for wins at the All-Star break. He beats the Chicago Cubs 6–3. In the second half of the season, Jones will lose seven games by one run, two of them by 1–0 scores.
- July 9 – The Houston Astros' Larry Dierker no-hits the host Montreal Expos, 6–0. He strikes out eight batters, including the first two in the ninth inning. Dierker had previously thrown two one-hitters.
- July 13 – The National League emerges victorious in the annual All-Star Game by a score of 7–1. George Foster, one of seven Cincinnati Reds position players on the squad, hits a home run with three RBI, and is named the MVP. Rookie pitcher Mark Fidrych gives up two runs and takes the loss. It is the NL's 13th win over the American League in the last 14 games.
- July 19:
  - Six days after he leads the American League to its All-Star Game defeat, Darrell Johnson, the reigning Sporting News Manager of the Year, is fired as pilot of the disappointing Boston Red Sox. Boston names third-base coach Don Zimmer, 45, his interim, and later permanent, successor. The defending AL champions are 41–45, 13 games behind the New York Yankees, and in the throes of a slump that will see them go 1–11 between July 16–26.
  - Willie Davis of the San Diego Padres gets his 2,500th hit, a single in the fourth off of Bill Bonham of the Chicago Cubs at San Diego Stadium. The Padres win 3–2.
- July 20 – Hank Aaron hits the 755th and last home run of his career, connecting off Dick Drago of the California Angels. Aaron's record of 755 home runs would stand until the San Francisco Giants' Barry Bonds hit his 756th career home run against the Washington Nationals on August 7, 2007.
- July 21 – The Montreal Expos trade outfielders Jim Dwyer and Pepe Mangual to the New York Mets for third baseman Wayne Garrett and outfielder Del Unser.
- July 22 – Lodged in the basement of the American League West with a 39–57 mark, the California Angels fire future Baseball Hall of Fame manager Dick Williams. The authoritarian Williams is at odds with third baseman Bill Melton and other players on his roster. The Angels name coach Norm Sherry interim pilot, and he leads them to a 37–29 finish to the season.
- July 23:
  - In a game against the Taiyō Whales, Sadaharu Oh of the Yomiuri Giants hits his 700th home run, the first player in Nippon Professional Baseball to do so.
  - Reggie Jackson of the Baltimore Orioles tied an American League record by becoming the sixth player to hit home runs in six consecutive games between July 18 and 23.
- July 24 – In a 17–2 blowout of the Chicago White Sox, Lyman Bostock becomes the fourth Minnesota Twin to hit for the cycle. Batting fourth for the first time ever, he goes four-for-four, with four RBI and four runs scored.
- July 26 – Carl Yastrzemski of the Boston Red Sox gets his 2,500th hit, a double in the first off of Stan Thomas of the Cleveland Indians at Fenway Park. The Red Sox lose 9–4.
- July 28:
  - Blue Moon Odom and Francisco Barrios combine on a no-hitter as the Chicago White Sox top the Oakland Athletics 2–1. For Odom, this is his last major league victory.
  - At Shea Stadium, Doc Medich and Dave Giusti combine for a 13-inning, three-hit shutout as the visiting Pittsburgh Pirates outlast the New York Mets, 1–0. Richie Hebner's solo homer provides the winning margin.

=== August ===
- August 8 – The first game of today's Royals–White Sox double header at Comiskey Park sees the White Sox appear on the field in shorts. The Sox return to long pants for the second game, after stealing five bases and defeating the Royals, 5–2.
- August 9 – John Candelaria becomes the first Pirates pitcher in 69 years to throw a no-hitter in Pittsburgh by blanking the Los Angeles Dodgers 2–0. Candelaria's no-hitter comes at Three Rivers Stadium. No Pirate ever threw a no-hitter at Forbes Field (1909–1970).
- August 12 – Blue Jays is the winning entry from 30,000 submissions in a "name that team" competition for Toronto's American League expansion team set to take the field in 1977.
- August 16 – Four days after their christening, the Toronto Blue Jays hire Pat Gillick, 38, as vice president, player personnel. A former scouting director of the Houston Astros and New York Yankees, Gillick will be promoted to general manager in December 1977 and build the Blue Jays into a two-time World Series champion (1992–1993) en route to a Hall-of-Fame executive career.
- August 21 – The National League's two tail-enders, the Montreal Expos (National League East) and San Francisco Giants (National League West) go 16 innings to decide a 5–4 Giants' victory at Candlestick Park.
- August 25 – Mariners is chosen as the nickname for Seattle's AL expansion team; 600 names from 15,000 entries are considered before the team's owners make their decision.
- August 28 – Minnesota Twins relief ace Bill Campbell throws six innings of three-hit, shutout ball but fails to gain a decision, as the Indians defeat Minnesota 4–3 in 17 innings at Cleveland Stadium.
- August 30 – The Oakland Athletics, eight games out of first place but nursing faint hopes of winning the American League West for the sixth straight year, purchase the contract of 38-year-old slugger Willie McCovey from the San Diego Padres.

=== September ===
- September 1 – The New York Yankees sign free-agent veteran utilityman César Tovar, released by the Oakland Athletics August 25.
- September 3:
  - At Shea Stadium, Tom Seaver fans Tommy Hutton of the Philadelphia Phillies in the seventh inning of the New York Mets' 1–0 victory. Hutton is Seaver's 200th strikeout victim of the season – and 1976 is the ninth straight year the Mets' right-hander has reached that mark.
  - The Seattle Mariners, set to join the American League as an expansion team in 1977, name Darrell Johnson the first manager in team history. Former MLB catcher and coach Johnson, 48, skippered the Boston Red Sox from 1974 to July 19, 1976, posting a 220–188 (.539) record, while winning the 1975 AL pennant and that year's "Manager of the Year" Award.
  - The Montreal Expos, who are 2–16 since August 13 and 43–85 on the season, fire first-year manager Karl Kuehl and name scout Charlie Fox, former pilot of the San Francisco Giants, his interim replacement.
- September 6:
  - Dodgers catcher Steve Yeager escapes a life-threatening injury when the jagged end of a broken bat strikes him in the throat while he's waiting in the on-deck circle. After 98-minute surgery to remove wooden splinters from his neck, Yeager recovers quickly and reappears in a Dodger game 19 days later.
  - After Labor Day action concludes, the four eventual division champions hold secure leads: the Philadelphia Phillies' 5½-game advantage over the Pittsburgh Pirates in the National League East is the closest race, followed by the Kansas City Royals' six-game lead over the Oakland Athletics (American League West), the Cincinnati Reds' eight-game bulge over the Los Angeles Dodgers (National League West), and the New York Yankees' 11½-game margin over the Baltimore Orioles (American League East).
- September 10 – The California Angels' Nolan Ryan strikes out 18 White Sox hitters in a nine-inning 3–2 victory at Chicago.
- September 11 – Future Hall-of-Famer Orestes "Minnie" Miñoso, 52, appears in his first MLB game since July 5, 1964. Playing at home for the Chicago White Sox, he goes 0-for-3 against Frank Tanana of the Angels. The next day, Miñoso singles off Sid Monge to become the oldest player to hit safely in a Major League game.
- September 16:
  - Jose Morales of the Montreal Expos pinch-hits a three-run double in the seventh against the Chicago Cubs, giving him 25 pinch hits for the season, breaking the previous record of 24 by Dave Philley and Vic Davalillo. The record will stand until John Vander Wal of the Colorado Rockies collects 28 in 1995.
  - Jerry Koosman wins his 20th game of the season, pitching a complete game and recording 13 strikeouts in the New York Mets' 4–1 win over the St. Louis Cardinals. It is Koosman's only 20-win season as a Met.
- September 17 – Bill Lucas of the Atlanta Braves becomes the first African American to serve as general manager of an MLB franchise when Ted Turner appoints him vice president and head of player personnel. Lucas, 40, is a former minor-league infielder who has served in the Braves' front office for 12 years; since 1972, he has been the club's player development director. Tragically, Lucas will hold the post for less than three years before his death from a cerebral hemorrhage in May 1979. His legacy as baseball's only black general manager will last until 1993, when Bob Watson takes the helm of the Houston Astros' front office.
- September 18 – Player-manager Frank Robinson of the Cleveland Indians inserts himself into the lineup as a pinch hitter in the eight inning of a game against the Baltimore Orioles. He singles in what will be his final at-bat as a player. His influence as a manager and executive will continue for decades to come.
- September 21 – In Cincinnati, the Cincinnati Reds clinch the National League West title with a 9–1 pasting of the San Diego Padres.
- September 22 – Peter Bavasi, president of the newly hatched Toronto Blue Jays, bypasses well-known names to appoint former MLB infielder and coach Roy Hartsfield the first manager in the expansion team's history. Hartsfield, 51, has been a successful minor-league skipper, most recently with the Triple-A Hawaii Islanders, and is a longtime associate of Bavasi's. The Blue Jays will join the American League in 1977.
- September 25 – The New York Yankees put an end to a six-game losing streak with a 10–6 win over the Detroit Tigers to wrap up the American League East and clinch their first visit to the postseason since the 1964 World Series. Doyle Alexander gets the victory.
- September 26 – In the last big league games at Montreal's Jarry Park Stadium, the Philadelphia Phillies beat the Expos 4–1 in the first game of a doubleheader to clinch the National League East title. The Phillies, who won the NL pennant in 1915 and 1950, make the postseason for only the third time in their 94-year history. The Phillies also take the nightcap, 2–1. Following the second game, Dick Allen jumps the team to protest the fact that veteran Tony Taylor is not listed on its postseason roster. Allen is fined by the Phillies and will return five days later, playing in two of the final three regular season games and the playoffs.
- September 28 – After 23 seasons, four World Series triumphs, seven National League pennants, and 2,040 regular-season victories, the Los Angeles Dodgers' Walter Alston, 64, steps down as manager. Third-base coach Tommy Lasorda, 49, is promoted to succeed him. Both Alston and Lasorda (who remains at the helm through June 23, 1996) will be elected to the Baseball Hall of Fame.
- September 29 – John Montefusco of the San Francisco Giants no-hits the Atlanta Braves 9–0 at Atlanta–Fulton County Stadium.

=== October ===
- October 1 – The Pittsburgh Pirates' successful leadership team of general manager Joe L. Brown and field manager Danny Murtaugh simultaneously retire. Both men are 58 years old. Brown was GM of the Bucs for 21 consecutive years, and Murtaugh led them from the dugout for all or parts of 15 seasons, over four different terms. Together they won two World Series and NL pennants (1960 and 1971) and four National League East titles (1970, 1971, 1974 and 1975). Farm system director Harding "Pete" Peterson succeeds Brown as general manager.
- October 3:
  - George Brett edges Kansas City Royals teammate Hal McRae for the American League batting title, .333 to .332, when his blooper drops in front of Minnesota Twins outfielder Steve Brye and skips over his head for an inside-the-park home run. McRae believes the misplay is deliberate, and charges the Twins with racism.
  - The Chicago Cubs' Bill Madlock wrests the National League batting crown from Ken Griffey by collecting four singles in an 8-2 win over the Montreal Expos. The hits raise Madlock from .333 to .339, one point ahead of the idle Griffey, who belatedly joins the Reds' lineup in a 11–1 win over the Atlanta Braves and goes 0-for-2, dropping his average to .336.
  - Hank Aaron singles in his last major league at bat and drives in his 2,297th run as the sixth-place Milwaukee Brewers lose to the Detroit Tigers, 5–2.
- October 5:
  - The St. Louis Cardinals part company with manager Red Schoendienst, who has led the Redbirds for a dozen seasons, compiled a 1,010–925 (.522) record, and won two National League pennants and the 1967 World Series. Schoendienst, 53, a St. Louis legend and future member of the Baseball Hall of Fame as a second baseman, will return to the Cardinals as a coach, interim manager and special assistant in 1979.
  - Coming off a last-place, 55–107 season, the Montreal Expos name two-time World Series-winning manager Dick Williams the third permanent skipper in their eight-year history. Taskmaster Williams, 47, had been dropped by the California Angels in late July after just over two full seasons and a poor 148–194 (.433) record; previously, however, as pilot of the Boston Red Sox (1967–1969) and Oakland Athletics (1971–1973), Williams had won three American League pennants and the 1972 and 1973 Fall Classics. In Montreal, Williams replaces interim skipper Charlie Fox, who moves up to general manager, while Jim Fanning assumes other baseball operations responsibilities.
- October 6 – The Chicago White Sox release player-coach Minnie Miñoso.
- October 7:
  - Judge Roy Hofheinz sells the Houston Astros to General Electric and Ford Motor Credit Companies.
  - The St. Louis Cardinals name longtime minor-league manager Vern Rapp, 48, to succeed Red Schoendienst as manager for 1977. Rapp led the 1976 Denver Bears to the championship of the Triple-A American Association.
  - Another successful Triple-A manager, Joe Altobelli, replaces Bill Rigney at the helm of the San Francisco Giants. Altobelli, 44, has spent six years as pilot of the Rochester Red Wings, making the International League playoffs each season and winning two Governors' Cups. Rigney retires from managing with a career mark of 1,239–1,321 (.484) over 15 seasons with three clubs.
- October 9 – The 1976 National League Championship Series, which pitted the 102–60 Cincinnati Reds against the 101–61 Philadelphia Phillies, ends quickly as defending world-champion Cincinnati defeats Philadelphia in three straight games. The Phillies never recover after losing Games 1 and 2 at Veterans Stadium. The Reds' Pete Rose collects six hits in 14 at bats.
- October 11 – In the last of the eighth inning, leading the Hanshin Tigers 4–1 with two out and a full count, Sadaharu Oh hits his 715th home run to pass Babe Ruth's mark. He finishes the season with 716 HRs and takes aim at Hank Aaron's record.
- October 13 – The Philadelphia Phillies' Danny Ozark, who led his team to the postseason for the first time since 1950, is named the Sporting News Manager of the Year for 1976.
- October 14 – In the deciding Game 5 of the 1976 American League Championship Series, the New York Yankees take a 6–3 lead before the Kansas City Royals' George Brett connects for a three-run home run in the top of the eighth inning. In the bottom of the ninth, New York's Chris Chambliss smashes the first pitch off Kansas City's Mark Littell over the right field fence for a 7–6 win, winning the Yankees their first AL pennant and World Series appearance since 1964.
- October 17 – The first-ever weekend night game in World Series history takes place in Cincinnati as the Reds defeat the New York Yankees, 4–3, in Game 2 of the Fall Classic. Games 3 and 4 also will occur under the lights.
- October 20 – The San Francisco Giants and St. Louis Cardinals make a three-for-three trade to kick off the offseason. The Giants send pitchers Mike Caldwell and John D'Acquisto and catcher Dave Rader to the Redbirds for pitcher John Curtis, utilityman Vic Harris and outfielder Willie Crawford.
- October 21 – In the World Series, the Cincinnati Reds beat the New York Yankees 7–2, completing a four-game sweep. Series MVP Johnny Bench has two home runs and five RBI in the Series, and demolishes the Yankees with .533 hitting. Opposing catcher Thurman Munson has six straight singles to tie a World Series mark. Cincinnati's "Big Red Machine" becomes the first team since the 1969 playoff expansion to go through an entire postseason without a defeat. The 1976 Fall Classic is the last World Series to end in a sweep until 1989.
- October 22 – Two weeks prior to the 1976 Major League Baseball expansion draft, the Seattle Mariners and Toronto Blue Jays begin the process of MLB player acquisition. The Mariners purchase the contracts of pitcher Diego Segui (from the Padres), catcher Larry Cox (Twins), and infielders José Báez (Dodgers) and Kurt Bevacqua (Brewers). The Blue Jays buy the contracts of three players, all from the Padres: third baseman Dave Hilton, third baseman/catcher Dave Roberts and outfielder John Scott.

=== November ===
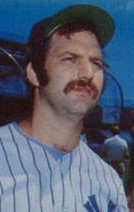
American League MVP Thurman Munson

- November 1 – In the first off-season after the Seitz decision, 23 major-league players are granted free agency after they've played out their option years with their current clubs. Seven are members of the Oakland Athletics, including Sal Bando, Don Baylor, Bert Campaneris, future Hall-of-Famer Rollie Fingers, Joe Rudi and Gene Tenace. The Baltimore Orioles lose four, including Wayne Garland, Bobby Grich and Hall-of-Fame-bound Reggie Jackson.
- November 2 – San Diego Padres pitcher Randy Jones beats out Jerry Koosman of the New York Mets for the National League Cy Young Award. Jones led the league with 315 innings pitched and posted a 22–14 record for the fifth-place Padres.
- November 5:
  - New American League franchises in Seattle and Toronto fill up their rosters by selecting 30 players apiece from unprotected players on other AL rosters. Outfielder Ruppert Jones (Seattle) and infielder Bob Bailor (Toronto) are the first choices.
  - The Oakland Athletics trade manager Chuck Tanner, who'd just completed his first and only season in Oakland, to the Pittsburgh Pirates for catcher Manny Sanguillen and $100,000. Tanner, who hails from Western Pennsylvania, succeeds retired Bucs' skipper Danny Murtaugh. Sanguillen plays just one year for the A's before returning to Pittsburgh, and is part of Tanner's 1979 World Series champion Pirates.
- November 6 – The Boston Red Sox make the first move in the maiden free-agent market, signing former Minnesota Twins closer Bill Campbell to a four-year, $1 million contract. Campbell, 27, led the American League in games pitched (78), games finished (68) and winning percentage (.773), posting a 17–5 won–lost record and a 3.01 earned run average in 1671/3 innings pitched.
- November 9 – The Oakland Athletics release Billy Williams, ending his career with 2,711 hits, 426 home runs, 1,475 RBI and a .290 average.
- November 10 – Jim Palmer of the Baltimore Orioles is named the 1976 American League Cy Young Award winner, becoming the first AL pitcher to win the honor three times.
- November 16:
  - New York Yankees catcher Thurman Munson wins the 1976 American League Most Valuable Player Award, becoming the first Yankee to win the award since Elston Howard, also a catcher, in 1963. Munson finished with a .302 average, 17 home runs and 105 RBI.
  - The California Angels sign free-agent former Oakland outfielder Don Baylor, 27, to a six-year, $1.6 million contract.
  - The Chicago White Sox name newly inducted Hall-of-Famer Bob Lemon their manager for 1977, replacing Paul Richards. A utility player turned pitcher, Lemon, 56, went 207–128 (.618) between 1946 and 1958 for the Cleveland Indians. He previously managed the Kansas City Royals to a 207–218 (.487) mark from June 9, 1970 through 1972.
- November 17:
  - The Atlanta Braves sign free-agent former San Francisco Giants outfielder Gary Matthews, 26, to a five-year, $1.875 million contract.
  - The California Angels sign free-agent outfielder Joe Rudi, 30, to a multi-year contract; specific terms were not disclosed.
  - The Montreal Expos sign free-agent former Philadelphia Phillies second baseman Dave Cash, 28, to a five-year contract.
  - The Texas Rangers sign free-agent former Oakland shortstop Bert Campaneris, 34, to a five-year contract. A six-time AL stolen base champion, Campaneris swiped 54 bags in 1976, third in the league.
- November 18:
  - The New York Yankees raid their 1976 World Series foe, the Cincinnati Reds, signing free-agent left-hander Don Gullett, 25, to a six-year contract worth a reported $2 million. Gullett has gone 91–44 over seven seasons since debuting with the Reds as a 19-year-old in 1970.
  - The Baltimore Orioles and Chicago White Sox take to the trading floor, with Baltimore acquiring veteran outfielder Pat Kelly from Chicago for catcher (and future MLB pitching guru) Dave Duncan. Duncan, 31, will be released by the White Sox on March 30, 1977 without playing an official game.
  - Another former Kansas City Royals skipper, Jack McKeon, is named to fill the Oakland Athletics' managerial vacancy. McKeon, 46, succeeded Bob Lemon in Kansas City in 1973 and compiled a 215–205 (.512) record there until his firing on July 23, 1975.
- November 19:
  - The Cleveland Indians sign free-agent former Baltimore pitcher Wayne Garland, 26, to a ten-year $2.3 million contract. Garland went 20–7 (2.67 ERA), with 14 complete games and four shutouts, in 38 games for the Orioles in 1976.
  - The Milwaukee Brewers sign free-agent veteran former Oakland Athletics' third baseman Sal Bando to a multi-year contract worth more than $1.5 million. Four-time All-Star Bando, 32, played for the Athletics for all or parts of 11 seasons.
- November 23:
  - The Houston Astros deal longtime ace starting pitcher, two-time All-Star, and 13-year team veteran Larry Dierker, 30, to the St. Louis Cardinals, along with infielder Jerry DaVanon, in exchange for catcher/outfielder Joe Ferguson and outfielder Bob Detherage. Future Astro broadcaster and manager Dierker has won 137 games in a Houston uniform since 1964.
  - The Texas Rangers sign free-agent former New York Yankees right-hander Doyle Alexander, 26, to a six-year contract.
- November 24:
  - Joe Morgan outdistances Cincinnati Reds teammate George Foster to win his second straight National League MVP Award. Morgan finished with a .320 average, 27 home runs, 111 RBI, 113 runs, 60 stolen bases, and led the NL in slugging percentage (.576) and OPS (1.020). Foster finished with 29 home runs and led the league with 121 RBI.
  - The California Angels sign free-agent former Baltimore Orioles second baseman Bobby Grich, 27, to a multi-year contract estimated to be worth $1.5 million.
  - Another MLB team overhauls its management team when the Chicago Cubs hire Bob Kennedy as general manager and Herman Franks as field manager, replacing Salty Saltwell and Jim Marshall respectively. Kennedy, 56, was the Cubs' "head coach" from 1963 through June 13, 1965, and recently was player development director of the St. Louis Cardinals (1970–1975) and part of the Seattle Mariners' brain trust. Franks, 62, returns to baseball from his successful business career; he is best known as manager of the 1965–1968 San Francisco Giants. Of the 24 MLB teams that competed in 1976, ten (42%) changed field managers during or after the season.
  - The Chicago White Sox sign free-agent former Cubs hurler Steve Stone, 29, to a two-year contract. For future broadcaster Stone, it will be his second tour of duty on Chicago's South Side; he had hurled for the 1973 White Sox before being included in that offseason's blockbuster Ron Santo trade.
- November 29:
  - Free-agent outfielder Reggie Jackson, who spent 1976 with the Baltimore Orioles, signs a five-year contract with the New York Yankees for $3.5 million. Jackson, who has already won three World Series rings with the Oakland Athletics, will earn two more with the Yankees, where he is nicknamed "Mister October."
  - The Cincinnati Reds' Pat Zachry and the San Diego Padres' Butch Metzger are named co-winners of the 1976 National League Rookie of the Year Award. The two pitchers each win 11 votes.
- November 30 – Danny Murtaugh, 59, who had retired as manager of the Pittsburgh Pirates less than two months before, suffers a stroke at his home near Chester, Pennsylvania. He dies two days later in a local hospital. Murtaugh's record in all or parts of 15 seasons at the Pirates' helm was 1,106–943 (.540) including National League pennants and World Series championships in 1960 and 1971. (See Deaths entry for December 2 below.)

=== December ===
- December 1 – Mark Fidrych, who won 19 games, posted a 2.34 earned run average, threw 24 complete games and fired four shutouts—and entertained fans of the previously downtrodden Detroit Tigers with his wacky antics—wins the 1976 American League Rookie of the Year Award. He takes 22 of 24 votes, with Minnesota Twins catcher Butch Wynegar garnering the other two.
- December 4 – Aurelio Rodríguez of the Tigers becomes the first American League third baseman since Frank Malzone in 1959 to beat out Brooks Robinson for the Gold Glove Award. Other newcomers on the TSN fielding team include third baseman Mike Schmidt, outfielder Dwight Evans and catcher Jim Sundberg, who will eventually combine to win 24 Gold Gloves.
- December 6:
  - The Boston Red Sox trade first baseman Cecil Cooper to the Milwaukee Brewers for first baseman George Scott and outfielder Bernie Carbo. The trade enables Boston to reacquire the slick-fielding, slugging Scott, as well as Carbo, but Cooper, 26, goes on to play 11 years in Milwaukee, bat .302 with 201 homers in a Brewer uniform, make five American League All-Star teams, and win two Silver Slugger Awards—as well as two Gold Glove Awards himself.
  - The Brewers make a second major trade, sending pitcher Jim Colborn and catcher Darrell Porter to the Kansas City Royals for infielder Jamie Quirk, outfielder Jim Wohlford, and left-handed pitcher Bob McClure ("player to be named later").
  - The Toronto Blue Jays trade designated hitter Rico Carty, their tenth pick in the expansion draft, to the Cleveland Indians for catcher Rick Cerone and outfielder John Lowenstein.
- December 7 – The Pittsburgh Pirates acquire southpaw relief pitcher Grant Jackson from the expansion Seattle Mariners for two young infielders, second baseman Jimmy Sexton and shortstop Craig Reynolds.
- December 8:
  - The Cleveland Indians trade outfielder and former AL All-Star George Hendrick, 27, to the San Diego Padres for catcher Fred Kendall, shortstop Héctor Torres and outfielder Johnny Grubb.
  - The Chicago Cubs, New York Mets and Kansas City Royals engage in a three-team interleague trade that sees the Cubs acquire outfielder Jim Dwyer, the Mets receive outfielder Sheldon Mallory, and the Royals obtain first baseman Pete LaCock.
  - The Houston Astros send outfielder Greg Gross to the Cubs for rookie second baseman Julio González.
- December 9 – The Texas Rangers trade outfielder and 1974 American League MVP Jeff Burroughs, 25, to the Atlanta Braves for five players—pitchers Adrian Devine, Roger Moret and Carl Morton and outfielders Ken Henderson and Dave May—and an estimated $250,000.
- December 10:
  - The Chicago White Sox acquire slugging outfielder Richie Zisk from the Pittsburgh Pirates, along with pitcher Silvio Martínez, for pitchers Terry Forster and future Hall-of-Famer Rich Gossage.
  - The St. Louis Cardinals reacquire third baseman Ken Reitz from the San Francisco Giants for pitcher Lynn McGlothen.
  - The Cleveland Indians obtain first baseman André Thornton from the Montreal Expos for pitcher Jackie Brown.
- December 14 – The San Diego Padres sign two free agents and former Oakland Athletics: pitcher Rollie Fingers and catcher Gene Tenace. Future Hall-of-Famer Fingers, 30, reportedly will earn over $250,000 annually, almost 3x his former salary; Tenace, also 30, gets an even richer deal, with an annual salary over $300,000 and a six-year term.
- December 15 – The Philadelphia Phillies sign free-agent former Pittsburgh Pirates third baseman Richie Hebner, 29, to a three-year, $600,000 contract. With future Hall-of-Famer Mike Schmidt entrenched at third, Hebner will move to first base for the 1977 Phillies.
- December 16 – In a trade that will contribute to the decline of "The Big Red Machine," the Cincinnati Reds deal eventual Hall-of-Famer and 7x All-Star first baseman Tony Pérez, 34, to the Montreal Expos, along with relief pitcher Will McEnaney, for pitchers Woodie Fryman and Dale Murray. The Reds are seeking to make room for young first baseman Dan Driessen, 25, but Pérez is a team leader and has several productive seasons ahead of him.

== Movies ==
- The Bad News Bears
- The Bingo Long Traveling All-Stars & Motor Kings

== Births ==
=== January ===
- January 4 – Ted Lilly
- January 5 – Kevin Witt
- January 7:
  - Éric Gagné
  - Alfonso Soriano
- January 8 – Carl Pavano
- January 10:
  - Jason Jiménez
  - Adam Kennedy
- January 14 – Pat Daneker
- January 21:
  - Jason Ryan
  - Ron Wright
- January 22 – Jimmy Anderson
- January 23 – Brandon Duckworth
- January 28 – Rod Lindsey

=== February ===
- February 1 – Phil Norton
- February 3 – Bart Miadich
- February 8:
  - Jim Parque
  - Adam Piatt
- February 10 – Lance Berkman
- February 13 – Brian Rose
- February 16 – Eric Byrnes
- February 17:
  - Cody Ransom
  - Scott Williamson
- February 23 – Scott Elarton
- February 24 – Randy Keisler
- February 28 – Bobby Madritsch
- February 29 – Terrence Long

=== March ===
- March 1 – Ramón Castro
- March 3 – Matt Treanor
- March 4 – Hiram Bocachica
- March 5:
  - Doug Clark
  - Paul Konerko
- March 8:
  - Juan Encarnación
  - Ryan Freel
- March 11 – Nate Teut
- March 12 – Bryan Hebson
- March 16 – Abraham Núñez
- March 17 – Scott Downs
- March 18:
  - Corky Miller
  - Tomokazu Ohka
  - Scott Podsednik
- March 21 – Mike Darr
- March 23 – Joel Peralta
- March 24:
  - Joe Davenport
  - Scott Wiggins
- March 29:
  - Scott Atchison
  - Kevin Nicholson

=== April ===
- April 5:
  - Matt Blank
  - Ryan Drese
  - Ross Gload
- April 6 – Alex Pelaez
- April 9:
  - Kyle Peterson
  - Óscar Robles
- April 11 – Kelvim Escobar
- April 12 – Jeff Wallace
- April 14:
  - Kyle Farnsworth
  - Paul Hoover
- April 20 – Jason Roach
- April 24 – John Barnes
- April 26 – Scott Strickland
- April 29:
  - Brandon Harper
  - Erasmo Ramírez

=== May ===
- May 4:
  - Robinson Cancel
  - Ben Grieve
  - Jason Michaels
- May 5 – Keith Ginter
- May 6 – Earl Snyder
- May 9 – Jimmy Serrano
- May 12 – Wes Helms
- May 14 – Brian Lawrence
- May 15:
  - Eric DuBose
  - Jason Karnuth
  - Tyler Walker
- May 17 – José Guillén
- May 18 – Roy Smith
- May 19 – Chris Fussell
- May 20 – Ramón Hernández
- May 21:
  - Rocky Biddle
  - Travis Harper
- May 23 – Jake Robbins
- May 24:
  - Carlos Febles
  - Jason Grabowski
  - Brandon Larson
- May 25 – Lariel González
- May 29 – Jerry Hairston Jr.

=== June ===
- June 4:
  - Chang-Yong Lim
  - J. C. Romero
- June 7 – Esix Snead
- June 8 – Kenji Johjima
- June 9 – Justin Kaye
- June 18 – Jeremy Powell
- June 19:
  - Dustan Mohr
  - Alex Prieto
- June 20:
  - Carlos Lee
  - Rob Mackowiak
- June 27:
  - Johnny Estrada
  - Chris Woodward

=== July ===
- July 5 – Jay Spurgeon
- July 12 – Dan Reichert
- July 16 – Kory DeHaan
- July 21 – Luis Saturria
- July 24 – Nate Bump
- July 25 – Javier Vázquez
- July 26:
  - Brian Mazone
  - Kevin Olsen
- July 28 – Mike Estabrook

=== August ===
- August 1 – Kevin Joseph
- August 3 – Troy Glaus
- August 4:
  - Kazuo Fukumori
  - Scott Linebrink
- August 5 – Bobby Kielty
- August 6 – Kris Wilson
- August 7 – Édgar Rentería
- August 11 – Bubba Crosby
- August 12:
  - Lew Ford
  - Ismael Villegas
- August 17:
  - Matt Anderson
  - Mike Cervenak
  - Yohanny Valera
- August 18 – Brian Bowles
- August 20 – Gene Kingsale
- August 21:
  - Derrin Ebert
  - Ramón Vázquez
- August 22:
  - Jeff Weaver
  - Randy Wolf
- August 23:
  - Mark DiFelice
  - Cole Liniak
- August 25:
  - Pedro Feliciano
  - Mike Rose
- August 26:
  - Geoff Geary
  - Alex Sánchez
- August 30:
  - Mike Koplove
  - Brian Shackelford
- August 31 – Jason Gilfillan

=== September ===
- September 1 – Lance Davis
- September 4:
  - Ron Calloway
  - Brian Myrow
- September 6 – Micheal Nakamura
- September 7 – Aaron Looper
- September 8 – Mike Rivera
- September 11 – Edwards Guzmán
- September 13 – Wade Miller
- September 15:
  - Elvis Peña
  - Matt Thornton
- September 16 – Chad Harville
- September 20 – Kevin Walker
- September 21 – Pedro Santana
- September 24 – Ben Broussard
- September 25 – Juan Cerros
- September 27:
  - Bo Hart
  - Jason Phillips
- September 29:
  - Jermaine Clark
  - Calvin Pickering

=== October ===
- October 2 – Víctor Santos
- October 6 – Freddy García
- October 10 – Pat Burrell
- October 11 – Carl Sadler
- October 13 – D. J. Reyburn
- October 14 – Henry Mateo
- October 17:
  - Seth Etherton
  - Jason Jones
- October 18 – Michael Tejera
- October 19:
  - Jeff Austin
  - Jason Shiell
  - Michael Young
- October 22:
  - Mike Colangelo
  - Michael Barrett
- October 23 – David Riske
- October 27 – Simon Pond
- October 30 – Dave Coggin

=== November ===
- November 1 – Cleatus Davidson
- November 2 – Sidney Ponson
- November 4 – Kevin Frederick
- November 5:
  - Alex Herrera
  - Liu Rodríguez
- November 7 – Les Walrond
- November 8:
  - Víctor Álvarez
  - Carlos Casimiro
- November 11:
  - Jason Grilli
  - Juan Melo
- November 14 – Tim Hamulack
- November 15 – Greg Jones
- November 24:
  - Damian Moss
  - Mike Edwards
- November 26 – Brian Schneider
- November 28 – Adam Bernero
- November 30 – Craig Wilson

=== December ===
- December 2 – Eddy Garabito
- December 3 – Gary Glover
- December 7 – Kevin Hooper
- December 8:
  - Reed Johnson
  - Rontrez Johnson
  - José León
- December 9 – Chris Booker
- December 13 – Josh Fogg
- December 15:
  - Aaron Miles
  - Todd Tichenor
- December 16 – Matt Kinney
- December 17:
  - Edwin Almonte
  - Jason Dellaero
  - Eric Eckenstahler
- December 19 – Jason Kershner
- December 20 – Aubrey Huff
- December 21 – Tony Cogan
- December 22:
  - Jason Lane
  - Wes Obermueller
- December 23 – Brad Lidge
- December 30:
  - A. J. Pierzynski
  - Brad Voyles

== Deaths ==
=== January ===
- January 2 – Jack Kraus, 57, left-handed pitcher who appeared in 70 career games for the Philadelphia Phillies (1943 and 1945) and New York Giants (1946)
- January 5:
  - Gene Elliott, 86, outfielder who played in five 1911 games for the New York Highlanders
  - Ed Sperber, 80, outfielder/pinch-runner who appeared in six contests for the 1924–1925 Boston Braves
- January 9 – Bert Johnson, 70, outfielder for four Negro leagues clubs between 1932 and 1938
- January 16 – Chick Autry, 91, utility first baseman/outfielder who appeared in 81 National League games for Cincinnati (1907 and 1909) and Boston (1909)
- January 17 – Ed Kinsella, 96, pitcher who appeared in 13 games as a member of the 1905 Pittsburgh Pirates and 1910 St. Louis Browns
- January 19 – Otto Ray, 82, catcher who appeared for four Negro National League teams between 1920 and 1924
- January 20 – Tom Dunn, 75, National League umpire from 1939 to 1946; home-plate umpire for 1943 All-Star Game, and worked 1944 World Series and 1,151 league games
- January 29:
  - Milt Galatzer, 68, backup outfielder who played in 248 games for the 1933–1936 Cleveland Indians and in three contests for the 1939 Cincinnati Reds
  - Harry Otis, 89, left-handed pitcher (nicknamed "Cannonball") who appeared in five games for the 1909 Cleveland Naps

=== February ===
- February 9 – Ziggy Hasbrook, 82, first baseman who got into 11 games during stints with the 1916 and 1917 Chicago White Sox
- February 10 – Eddie Moore, 77, infielder/outfielder who played in 748 games for Pittsburgh Pirates, Boston Braves, Brooklyn Robins, New York Giants and Cleveland Indians between 1923 and 1934; starting second baseman for 1925 World Series champion Pittsburgh
- February 11 – Johnny Miljus, 80, pitcher who appeared in 127 games for the Pittsburgh Rebels (of the Federal League), Brooklyn Robins, Pittsburgh Pirates and Cleveland Indians between 1915 and 1929; appeared in two contests for the losing Pirates in 1927 World Series
- February 16:
  - Eusebio González, 83, Cuban shortstop who played in three midseason games for the 1918 Boston Red Sox
  - John Shovlin, 85, infielder who appeared in 18 MLB games for the 1911 Pittsburgh Pirates and the 1919–1920 St. Louis Browns
- February 24 – Carey Selph, 74, infielder with St. Louis Cardinals (1929) and Chicago White Sox (1932) who appeared in 141 MLB games

=== March ===
- March 1 – George "Rube" Foster, 88, pitcher in 138 games for the 1913–1917 Boston Red Sox; member of 1915 and 1916 world champions; in 1915, won 19 regular-season games and threw two complete-game victories against the Philadelphia Phillies in the World Series, including the clinching fifth game
- March 6 – Emory Long, 63, infielder in the Negro leagues between 1932 and 1940
- March 11 – Larry Gardner, 89, third baseman for the Boston Red Sox and Cleveland Indians (1908–1924) who was a member of four World Series championship teams (1912, 1915, 1916, 1920) and batted .300 or better five times; longtime coach at University of Vermont
- March 13 – Johnny Pasek, 70, catcher who appeared in 32 career games for the 1933 Detroit Tigers and 1934 Chicago White Sox
- March 17 – Bert Gallia, 84, pitcher in 242 career games for the 1912–1917 Washington Senators, 1918–1920 St. Louis Browns and 1920 Philadelphia Phillies; won 17 games in back-to-back years with the 1915–1916 Senators
- March 18 – Paul Maloy, 83, pitcher in two midsummer contests for the 1913 Boston Red Sox
- March 21 – Heinie Scheer, 75, second baseman who got into 120 games for 1922–1923 Philadelphia Athletics
- March 23 – Walter Murphy, 65, pitcher for the 1931 Red Sox who appeared in two games

=== April ===
- April 12:
  - John Mungin, 71, pitcher for the Baltimore Black Sox and Harrisburg Giants of the Eastern Colored League from 1925 to 1927
  - Zollie Wright, 66, outfielder for four Negro National League clubs from 1935 to 1941; selected an All-Star in 1936
- April 13 – Mike McCormick, 58, outfielder with Cincinnati Reds (1940–1943, 1946), Boston Braves (1946–1948), Brooklyn Dodgers (1949), New York Giants (1950), Chicago White Sox (1950) and Washington Senators (1951) who appeared in 748 MLB games; played in three World Series (1940, 1948, 1949) and batted .310 in 29 at bats for Cincinnati's 1940 world champions
- April 15 – Floyd Newkirk, 67, pitcher who threw one inning of scoreless relief for the New York Yankees in his only MLB game, on August 23, 1934
- April 15 – George Scales, 75, second baseman and manager in the Negro leagues whose 20-year playing career spanned 1921 to 1946; also a manager in the Puerto Rican winter league
- April 17 – Clay Hopper, 73, Mississippi native and longtime minor-league player and manager between 1926 and 1956 who, as skipper of the 1946 Montreal Royals, was Jackie Robinson's manager when he broke the color line in "Organized Baseball"
- April 22 – Ernie Krueger, 85, catcher who appeared in 318 career games for the Cleveland Naps (1913), New York Yankees (1915), New York Giants (1917), Brooklyn Robins (1917–1921) and Cincinnati Reds (1925); appeared in three games of the 1920 World Series
- April 26 – Alex Ferguson, 79, pitcher who made 257 appearances for the New York Yankees, Boston Red Sox, Washington Senators, Philadelphia Phillies and Brooklyn Robins between 1918 and 1929; led American League in games lost (17) in 1924
- April 27 – Ed Durham, 72, pitcher who worked in 143 games for the Red Sox and Chicago White Sox between 1929 and 1933
- April 29 – Joe Berry, 81, second baseman in 15 games for the 1921–1922 New York Giants

=== May ===
- May 1 – Luther McDonald, 70, right-hander who pitched for three Negro National League teams between 1927 and 1935; went 13–4 (4.28 ERA) for 1927 St. Louis Stars
- May 2 – Dan Bankhead, 55, first black pitcher in modern National League history (1947, 1950–1951) as a Brooklyn Dodger; homered in first major league at-bat, August 26, 1947; posted 9–5 record with 6.52 ERA in 52 MLB games
- May 3 – Ernie Nevers, 73, who excelled in several sports, including American football, basketball and baseball, where he was a right-handed pitcher who appeared in 44 games for the St. Louis Browns between 1926 and 1928
- May 4 – Bob Cooney, 68, pitcher who got into 28 games for the Browns in 1931 and 1932
- May 10 – Ken Trinkle, 56, pitcher for the New York Giants (1943, 1946–1948) and Philadelphia Phillies (1949), who led the National League in games played by a pitcher in 1946 (48) and 1947 (62)
- May 18 – Marion Fricano, 52, pitcher who appeared in 88 career games for the Philadelphia/Kansas City Athletics between 1952 and 1955; on September 26, 1954, as he nailed down a save in the Athletics' last regular-season game, he threw the final pitch in the 54-year history of the franchise in Philadelphia
- May 25 – Al Lakeman, 57, reserve catcher/first baseman for the Cincinnati Reds (1942–1947), Philadelphia Phillies (1947–1948), Boston Braves (1949) and Detroit Tigers (1954); later a coach for the Boston Red Sox (1963–1964 and 1967–1969)
- May 30 – Max Carey, 86, Hall of Fame center fielder, mainly with the Pittsburgh Pirates, who led NL in steals ten times, holding league career record of 738 until 1974; set NL records for career games, putouts, chances and double plays in outfield, and batted .458 in 1925 World Series; managed Brooklyn Dodgers in 1932 and 1933

=== June ===
- June 3:
  - Paul Chervinko, 65, catcher who appeared in 42 games for the Dodgers in 1937 and 1938; later a minor league manager
  - Dwight Stone, 89, pitcher for St. Louis of the American League and Kansas City of the Federal League in 1913–1914
- June 5 – Otis Lambeth, 86, pitcher in 43 games for the Cleveland Indians between 1916 and 1918
- June 11:
  - Chet Covington, 65, left-handed pitcher who appeared in 19 games for the 1944 Philadelphia Phillies
  - Jim Konstanty, 59, All-Star pitcher who became the first reliever to win the MVP award, with the 1950 "Whiz Kid" Phillies, when he won 16 games, all out of the bullpen, and saved 22 more to lead the National League, setting a then-MLB record for games pitched (74); in 433 career games over 11 MLB seasons (1944–1946 and 1948–1956) with five clubs, posted a 66–48 (3.46) record with 76 saves
- June 15 – Jimmy Dykes, 79, All-Star third baseman during a 22-year playing career (1918–1939) for the Philadelphia Athletics and Chicago White Sox, who went on to become the winningest manager (899 victories between May 9, 1934 and May 24, 1946) in White Sox history; succeeded Connie Mack as skipper of Athletics (1951–1953), and also managed Baltimore Orioles (1954), Cincinnati Redlegs (1958), Detroit Tigers (1959–1960) and Cleveland Indians (1960–1961)
- June 16 – George Dickey, 60, catcher who appeared in 223 MLB games for the Boston Red Sox (1935–1936) and Chicago White Sox (1941–1942; 1946–1947); brother of Bill Dickey
- June 19 – Henry "Prince" Oana, 66, pitcher, outfielder and native of Hawaii, who played in 30 games for the 1934 Philadelphia Phillies and 1943 and 1945 Detroit Tigers; batted .308 in 52 at bats, and went 3–2 (3.77) in 13 mound appearances
- June 20:
  - Blix Donnelly, 62, pitcher who appeared in 190 games between 1944 and 1951 for the St. Louis Cardinals, Philadelphia Phillies and Boston Braves; member of 1944 World Series champion Cardinals
  - Lou Klein, 57, infielder in 305 games for Cardinals (1943–1944, 1946 and 1949), Cleveland Indians (1951) and Philadelphia Athletics (1951) who spent the prime of his career (1946–1949) under suspension for "jumping" to the Mexican League; later a minor-league manager before becoming a member of the Chicago Cubs' "College of Coaches" (1961–1965); served as Cubs' head coach (manager) for parts of 1961, 1962 and 1965
- June 23 – Lon Warneke, 67, five-time All-Star pitcher who had three 20-win seasons for the Cubs, led National League in victories and ERA in 1932, and won 192 games over 15 seasons for the Cubs and Cardinals; later an NL umpire for seven years (1949–1955)
- June 30 – Firpo Marberry, 77, pitcher for the Washington Senators (1923–1932 and 1936), Detroit Tigers (1933–1935) and New York Giants (1936), who established single-season and career records for both saves and relief appearances; led majors in saves a record five times; also 94–52 as a starter; member of 1924 World Series champions

=== July ===
- July 9:
  - Louis English, 74, catcher who wore the uniforms of Detroit, Nashville and Louisville of the Negro National League and Negro Southern League between 1929 and 1932
  - Tom Yawkey, 73, owner and president of the Boston Red Sox from 1933 until his death, and vice president of the American League from 1956 to 1973; named to Hall of Fame by Veterans Committee in 1980
- July 21 – Earle Combs, 77, Hall of Fame center fielder for the New York Yankees (1924–1935) who batted .325 lifetime and led the AL in triples three times; batting leadoff, he had eight seasons of 100 runs, and batted .350 over four World Series; won three championship rings as a player and six more as a Yankee coach (1935–1944)
- July 24 – Sam Bankhead, 65, infielder/outfielder for multiple Negro League teams, including the Birmingham Black Barons and Homestead Grays; older brother of Dan Bankhead, who died May 2
- July 26 – Les Howe, 80, pitcher who appeared in 16 games for the 1923–1924 Boston Red Sox
- July 29 – Elmer Myers, 82, pitcher for Philadelphia Athletics, Cleveland Indians and Boston Red Sox who worked in 185 games between 1915 and 1922
- July 30 – Jack Knight, 81, pitcher who appeared in 72 games for three National League clubs, principally Philadelphia, in 1922 and from 1925 to 1927; longtime minor-league manager

=== August ===
- August 3 – Homer Ezzell, 80, third baseman for the St. Louis Browns and Boston Red Sox between 1923 and 1925
- August 15:
  - Jim Henry, 66, pitched from 1936 through 1939 for the Boston Red Sox and Philadelphia Phillies
  - Dick Lajeskie, 50, second baseman who had a six-game audition with the New York Giants in September 1946
- August 16 – George Aiton, 85, outfielder in ten games for the 1912 St. Louis Browns
- August 17 – Bert Tooley, 89, shortstop for 1911–1912 Brooklyn Dodgers who appeared in 196 contests
- August 19 – Johnny Walker, 79, first baseman who played 125 games for the 1919–1921 Philadelphia Athletics
- August 27 – Bill Mizeur, 79, pinch hitter in two games for the 1923–1924 St. Louis Browns; minor-league outfielder who had a 14-year playing career
- August 28 – Bill Hunnefield, 77, infielder in 511 MLB games for the Chicago White Sox (1926–1930), Cleveland Indians (1931), Boston Braves (1931) and New York Giants (1931)
- August 29 – Al Platte, 86, longtime minor-league outfielder who appeared in eight MLB games for the 1913 Detroit Tigers

=== September ===
- September 1 – Mike Meola, 70, pitcher for the Boston Red Sox and St. Louis Browns between 1933 and 1936, who was winless in 18 MLB games; posted a record of 20–5 with 2.90 ERA for the Pacific Coast League's Los Angeles Angels in 1934
- September 4 – Monroe Mitchell, 74, pitcher who worked in ten games for the 1923 Washington Senators
- September 5 – Jim O'Neill, 83, shortstop and second baseman for 1920 and 1923 Washington Senators; one of four brothers to play in the majors, including Steve O'Neill
- September 6 – Vern Fear, 52, relief pitcher who appeared in four games for 1952 Chicago Cubs
- September 10 – Blackie Carter, 73, outfielder who played in six games for the New York Giants from 1925 to 1926
- September 20:
  - Luther Gilyard, 66, first baseman for Chicago, St. Louis and Birmingham of the Negro American League between 1937 and 1942
  - John J. Quinn, 68, front-office executive who spent over 40 years in the majors; general manager of Boston/Milwaukee Braves (1945–1958) and Philadelphia Phillies (1959–1972); son and father of longtime baseball executives
- September 25 – Red Faber, 88, Hall of Fame pitcher who played his entire 20-year career with the Chicago White Sox, winning 254 games and leading AL in ERA twice; his four 20-win seasons included a 25-win campaign for the scandal-decimated 1921 team, which finished 62–92
- September 26:
  - Buddy Crump, 74, centerfielder who played one MLB game, on September 28, 1924, as a member of the New York Giants
  - Rip Russell, 61, first- and third baseman who got into 425 career games for the Chicago Cubs (1939–1942) and Boston Red Sox (1946–1947)
- September 28 – Linc Blakely, 64, outfielder who batted .225 in 102 at bats during his 34-game trial with the 1934 Cincinnati Reds

=== October ===
- October 1 – Jelly Taylor, 66, three-time All-Star first baseman for the Cincinnati Tigers and Memphis Red Sox of the Negro American League between 1937 and 1946
- October 2 – Walter Calhoun, 65, left-hander who pitched in the Negro leagues between 1932 and 1946; selected to 1940 All-Star team while a member of the St. Louis–New Orleans Stars
- October 4 – Ollie Carnegie, 77, outfielder and minor-league slugger who excelled as a member of the Buffalo Bisons over a dozen seasons between 1931 and 1945; member of the International League Hall of Fame
- October 5 – Bill Bagwell, 85, outfielder and pinch hitter who appeared in 92 games for the 1923 Boston Braves and 1925 Philadelphia Athletics
- October 6 – Joe Erautt, 55, Canadian-born catcher who played in 32 games for the 1951–1952 Chicago White Sox
- October 8 – John Bottarini, 68, catcher and 18-year veteran of minor leagues who appeared in 26 MLB games for 1937 Chicago Cubs
- October 9:
  - Mark Christman, 62, third baseman and shortstop who appeared in 911 games for the Detroit Tigers, St. Louis Browns and Washington Senators between 1938 and 1949; starting third baseman for 1944 Browns, only St. Louis entry to win an American League pennant
  - Bob Moose, 29, pitcher for the Pittsburgh Pirates from 1967 to 1976 who threw a no-hitter on September 20, 1969 against the pennant-bound New York Mets and led National League in winning percentage (14–3, .824) that season; posted a 76–71 career record in 289 career games; died in an automobile accident on his birthday
- October 20 – Freddie Muller, 65, infielder who played in 17 career games for the 1933–1934 Boston Red Sox
- October 25 – Claire Merritt Ruth, 79, widow of Babe Ruth, who died on August 16, 1948
- October 26 – Eddie Silber, 62, outfielder for the 1937 and 1939 St. Louis Browns who played in 23 MLB games
- October 29:
  - Harry Malmberg, 51, second baseman in 67 games for 1955 Detroit Tigers; coach for 1963–1964 Boston Red Sox; longtime minor league manager
  - Andy Sarvis, 68, pitcher for the Cleveland Bears and Jacksonville Red Caps of the Negro American League between 1940 and 1942
- October 31 – Charles Bernard "King" Lear, 85, Cincinnati Reds pitcher who fashioned a 7–12 record (3.02 ERA) in 57 games during the 1914 and 1915 seasons

=== November ===
- November 2:
  - Regis Leheny, 68, left-handed pitcher for the 1932 Red Sox who worked in two games
  - Dee Miles, 67, outfielder who appeared in 503 career games for the Washington Senators (1935–1936), Philadelphia Athletics (1939–1942) and Boston Red Sox (1943)
- November 3 – Frank Brazill, 77, first baseman/third baseman in 72 total games for the 1921–1922 Athletics
- November 9 – Bud Culloton, 80, pitcher who hurled in 13 games for the 1925 and 1926 Pittsburgh Pirates
- November 11:
  - Ken Crawford, 82, first baseman for the 1915 Baltimore Terrapins of the "outlaw" Federal League
  - Jimmy O'Connell, 75, reserve outfielder for 1923–1924 National League champion New York Giants; suspended for life by Commissioner Kenesaw Mountain Landis after he was implicated in an unsuccessful scheme to bribe a Philadelphia player to deliberately lose the final games of the 1924 season
- November 14 – Fred Baczewski, 50, left-hander who went 17–10 (4.45 ERA) in 63 games for the Chicago Cubs and Cincinnati Redlegs from 1953 to 1956; placed sixth in 1953 NL Rookie of the Year balloting
- November 19 – Frank Kellert, 52, first baseman for the St. Louis Browns, Baltimore Orioles, Brooklyn Dodgers and Chicago Cubs, getting into 122 career games from 1953 to 1956; member of Brooklyn's 1955 world champions
- November 20 – Les Hennessy, 82, second baseman who played 14 games for the 1913 Detroit Tigers
- November 25 – John André, 53, four-time 20-game-winning pitcher in the minors who received a 22-game trial with the 1955 Cubs
- November 27 – Al Baird, 81, infielder who appeared in 48 total games for the 1917 and 1919 New York Giants

=== December ===
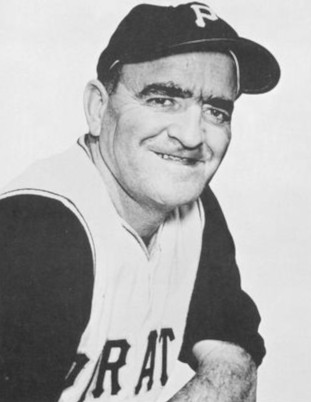
Danny Murtaugh (1964)

- December 1 – George Earnshaw, 76, pitcher who had three 20-win seasons for 1929–1930–1931 AL champion Philadelphia Athletics; later a scout and coach
- December 2 – Danny Murtaugh, 59, manager who over 15 seasons and four stints with the Pittsburgh Pirates won two World Series (1960, 1971) and three NL East titles between August 1957 and his October 1976 retirement; former second baseman for Pirates, Philadelphia Phillies and Boston Braves who appeared in 767 total games; led NL in stolen bases as rookie in 1941; Pirates retired his uniform #40 in his memory (1977)
- December 3 – Leo Townsend, 85, left-handed pitcher who worked in eight games for the Boston Braves in 1920 and 1921
- December 6 – Jonathan "Mandy" Brooks, 79, outfielder who played 116 games for the 1925–1926 Chicago Cubs
- December 7 – Duke Maas, 47, pitcher who won 45 games for the Detroit Tigers, Kansas City Athletics and New York Yankees between 1955 and 1961
- December 9:
  - Wes Ferrell, 68, All-Star pitcher who had six 20-win seasons for the Cleveland Indians and Boston Red Sox, with 193 career wins, including a no-hitter; batted .280 in 1,176 at bats, with 38 homers among his 329 hits over his 15-year MLB career (1927–1941), and caught by brother Rick for five seasons; also played for the Washington Senators, New York Yankees, Brooklyn Dodgers and Boston Braves
  - Annie Gosbee, 40, All-American Girls Professional Baseball League infielder
  - Red Haley, 75, lefty-swinging infielder who played for the Chicago American Giants and Birmingham Black Barons of the Negro National League in 1928 and the barnstorming Kansas City Monarchs in 1933
- December 10:
  - Vic Keen, 77, pitcher for 1981 Philadelphia Athletics, 1921–1925 Chicago Cubs and 1926–1927 St. Louis Cardinals; member of 1926 World Series champions
  - Danny Thompson, 29, infielder with the Minnesota Twins (1970–1976) and Texas Rangers (1976), who played four seasons after being diagnosed with leukemia; appeared in his last game on October 2, 1976 (as a pinch hitter), and died two months and one week later
  - Luis Tiant Sr., 70, Cuban-born southpaw and father of the star pitcher of the 1960s and 1970s; three-time All-Star hurler as a member of the New York Cubans of the Negro National League whose playing career encompassed 20 years (1928–1947) in the Cuban and Dominican winter leagues, Negro leagues, and Mexican League
- December 18 – Ned Harris, 60, outfielder for the Detroit Tigers (1941–1943, 1946) who appeared in 262 career games
- December 25 – Bill Skiff, 81, ex-catcher who followed his 22-game MLB playing career with 1921 Pittsburgh Pirates and 1926 New York Yankees with a long tenure as a minor league player and manager, then as a scout for the Yankees' organization
- December 26 – Walt Lynch, 79, catcher in three contests for the 1922 Boston Red Sox
- December 27 – Press Cruthers, 86, Philadelphia Athletics second baseman who appeared in seven games in 1913 and 1914, who later managed in the All-American Girls Professional Baseball League
