= 2002 San Diego Padres season =

2002 San Diego Padres
- League: National League
- Division: West
- Ballpark: Qualcomm Stadium
- City: San Diego, California
- Record: 66–96 (.407)
- Divisional place: 5th
- Owners: John Moores
- General managers: Kevin Towers
- Managers: Bruce Bochy
- Television: KUSI-TV; 4SD (Mark Grant, Matt Vasgersian, Rick Sutcliffe)
- Radio: KOGO (Jerry Coleman, Ted Leitner); KURS (Rene Mora, Juan Avila, Eduardo Ortega)

The 2002 San Diego Padres season was the 34th season in franchise history.

== Offseason ==
- December 27, 2001: Alan Embree was signed as a free agent with the San Diego Padres.
- February 24, 2002: Trenidad Hubbard was signed as a free agent with the San Diego Padres.
- March 16, 2002: Mark Sweeney was signed as a free agent with the San Diego Padres.

== Regular season ==
=== Opening Day starters ===
- D'Angelo Jiménez – 2B
- Mark Kotsay – CF
- Ron Gant – LF
- Phil Nevin – 1B
- Bubba Trammell – RF
- Deivi Cruz – SS
- Wiki González – C
- Ramon Vazquez – 3B
- Kevin Jarvis – SP

=== Season standings ===
==== National League West ====
NL West
Team	W	L	Pct.	GB	Home	Road
Arizona Diamondbacks	98	64	.605	—	55‍–‍26	43‍–‍38
San Francisco Giants	95	66	.590	2½	50‍–‍31	45‍–‍35
Los Angeles Dodgers	92	70	.568	6	46‍–‍35	46‍–‍35
Colorado Rockies	73	89	.451	25	47‍–‍34	26‍–‍55
San Diego Padres	66	96	.407	32	41‍–‍40	25‍–‍56

==== Record vs. opponents ====
2002 National League record Source: MLB Standings Grid – 2002
Team	AZ	ATL	CHC	CIN	COL	FLA	HOU	LAD	MIL	MON	NYM	PHI	PIT	SD	SF	STL	AL
Arizona	—	3–3	4–2	6–0	14–5	5–1	3–3	9–10	4–2	4–2	5–2	4–3	4–2	12–7	8–11	2–4	11–7
Atlanta	3–3	—	4–2	4–2	4–3	11–8	3–3	2–4	5–1	13–6	12–7	11–7	3–3	3–3	3–3–1	5–1	15–3
Chicago	2–4	2–4	—	5–12	4–2	4–2	8–11	2–4	7–10	3–3	1–5	2–4	10–9	2–4	3–3	6–12	6–6
Cincinnati	0–6	2–4	12–5	—	3–3	5–1	6–11	4–2	13–6	1–5	2–4	2–4	11–7	5–1	2–4	8–11	2–10
Colorado	5–14	3–4	2–4	3–3	—	5–2	3–3	7–12	3–3	4–2	3–3	3–3	4–2	11–8	8–12	2–4	7–11
Florida	1–5	8–11	2–4	1–5	2–5	—	3–3	3–3	4–2	10–9	8–11	10–9	4–2	5–1	4–3	4–2	10–8
Houston	3–3	3–3	11–8	11–6	3–3	3–3	—	3–3	10–8	3–3	4–2	3–3	11–6	4–2	1–5	6–13	5–7
Los Angeles	10–9	4–2	4–2	2–4	12–7	3–3	3–3	—	5–1	5–2	4–2	4–3	4–2	10–9	8–11	2–4	12–6
Milwaukee	2–4	1–5	10–7	6–13	3–3	2–4	8–10	1–5	—	2–4	1–5	1–5	4–15	5–1	1–5	7–10	2–10
Montreal	2–4	6–13	3–3	5–1	2–4	9–10	3–3	2–5	4–2	—	11–8	11–8	3–3	3–4	4–2	3–3	12–6
New York	2–5	7–12	5–1	4–2	3–3	11–8	2–4	2–4	5–1	8–11	—	9–10	1–4	3–4	0–6	3–3	10–8
Philadelphia	3–4	7–11	4–2	4–2	3–3	9–10	3–3	3–4	5–1	8–11	10–9	—	2–4	2–4	3–3	4–2	10–8
Pittsburgh	2–4	3–3	9–10	7–11	2–4	2–4	6–11	2–4	15–4	3–3	4–1	4–2	—	2–4	2–4	6–11	3–9
San Diego	7–12	3–3	4–2	1–5	8–11	1–5	2–4	9–10	1–5	4–3	4–3	4–2	4–2	—	5–14	1–5	8–10
San Francisco	11–8	3–3–1	3–3	4–2	11–8	3–4	5–1	11–8	5–1	2–4	6–0	3–3	4–2	14–5	—	2–4	8–10
St. Louis	4–2	1–5	12–6	11–8	4–2	2–4	13–6	4–2	10–7	3–3	3–3	2–4	11–6	5–1	4–2	—	8–4

=== Notable transactions ===
- June 26, 2002: Alan Embree was traded by the San Diego Padres with Andy Shibilo (minors) to the Boston Red Sox for Dan Giese and Brad Baker (minors).
- July 15, 2002: Mark Sweeney was released by the San Diego Padres.
- July 31, 2002: Jason Bay was traded by the New York Mets with Josh Reynolds (minors) and Bobby Jones to the San Diego Padres for Steve Reed and Jason Middlebrook.
- August 13, 2002: Mark Sweeney was signed as a free agent with the San Diego Padres.
- August 16, 2002: Mark Sweeney was released by the San Diego Padres.
- September 4, 2002: Trenidad Hubbard was released by the San Diego Padres.

=== Roster ===
2002 San Diego Padres
Roster
Pitchers: 58 Jason Boyd; 54 Mike Bynum; 41 Clay Condrey; 49 Éric Cyr; 41 Tom Davey; 40 Matt DeWitt; 53 Adam Eaton; 41 Alan Embree; 57 Jeremy Fikac; 51 Trevor Hoffman; 58 Mike Holtz; 36 Ben Howard; 32 Kevin Jarvis; 17 Jonathan Johnson; 28 Bobby J. Jones; 39 Bobby M. Jones; 46 Jason Kershner; 50 Brian Lawrence; 47 David Lundquist; 54 Jason Middlebrook; 43 Juan Moreno; 46 Rodney Myers; 43 Doug Nickle; 37 José Núñez; 59 Jason Pearson; 44 Jake Peavy; 59 Óliver Pérez; 43 Kevin Pickford; 39 Steve Reed; 46 Jason Shiell; 45 Dennis Tankersley; 55 Brian Tollberg; 20 Brett Tomko; 58 J. J. Trujillo; 47 Brandon Villafuerte; 56 Kevin Walker	Catchers: 29 Javier Cardona; 7 Wiki González; 25 Tom Lampkin; 33 Wil Nieves; Infielders: 24 Kevin Barker; 34 Brian Buchanan; 21 Sean Burroughs; 2 César Crespo; 8 Deivi Cruz; 4 D'Angelo Jiménez; 10 Julius Matos; 23 Phil Nevin; 24 Alex Pelaez; 33 Mark Sweeney; 1 Ramón Vázquez	Outfielders: 29 Kory DeHaan; 9 Ron Gant; 12 Trenidad Hubbard; 18 Gene Kingsale; 30 Ryan Klesko; 14 Mark Kotsay; 16 Ray Lankford; 27 Bubba Trammell	Manager: 15 Bruce Bochy; Coaches: 48 Darrel Akerfelds (bullpen); 38 Greg Booker (pitching); 52 Duane Espy (hitting); 11 Tim Flannery (third Base); 5 Rob Picciolo (bench); 3 Alan Trammell (first base)

== Player stats ==
=== Batting ===
==== Starters by position ====
Note: Pos = Position; G = Games played; AB = At bats; H = Hits; Avg. = Batting average; HR = Home runs; RBI = Runs batted in

Pos	Player	G	AB	H	Avg.	HR	RBI
C	Tom Lampkin	104	281	61	.217	10	37
1B	Ryan Klesko	146	540	162	.300	29	95
2B	Ramón Vázquez	128	423	116	.274	2	32
SS	Deivi Cruz	151	514	135	.263	7	47
3B	Phil Nevin	107	407	116	.285	12	57
LF	Ron Gant	102	309	81	.262	18	59
CF	Mark Kotsay	153	578	169	.292	17	61
RF	Bubba Trammell	133	403	98	.243	17	56

==== Other batters ====
Note: G = Games played; AB = At bats; H = Hits; Avg. = Batting average; HR = Home runs; RBI = Runs batted in

Player	G	AB	H	Avg.	HR	RBI
D'Angelo Jimenez	87	321	77	.240	3	33
Gene Kingsale	89	216	60	.278	2	28
Ray Lankford	81	205	46	.224	6	26
Sean Burroughs	63	192	52	.271	1	11
Julius Matos	76	185	44	.238	2	19
Wiki González	56	164	36	.220	1	20
Trent Hubbard	89	129	27	.209	1	7
Brian Buchanan	48	92	27	.293	6	13
Wil Nieves	28	72	13	.181	0	3
Mark Sweeney	48	65	11	.169	1	4
Javier Cardona	15	39	4	.103	0	2
César Crespo	25	29	5	.172	0	0
Kevin Barker	7	19	3	.158	0	0
Kory DeHaan	12	11	1	.091	0	0
Alex Pelaez	3	8	2	.250	0	0

=== Pitching ===
==== Starting pitchers ====
Note: G = Games pitched; IP = Innings pitched; W = Wins; L = Losses; ERA = Earned run average; SO = Strikeouts

Player	G	IP	W	L	ERA	SO
Brian Lawrence	35	210.0	12	12	3.69	149
Brett Tomko	32	204.1	10	10	4.49	126
Booby Jones	19	108.0	7	8	5.50	60
Jake Peavy	17	97.2	6	7	4.52	90
Óliver Pérez	16	90.0	4	5	3.50	94
Brian Tollberg	12	61.2	1	5	6.13	33
Kevin Jarvis	7	35.0	2	4	4.37	24
Adam Eaton	6	33.1	1	1	5.40	25

==== Other pitchers ====
Note: G = Games pitched; IP = Innings pitched; W = Wins; L = Losses; ERA = Earned run average; SO = Strikeouts

Player	G	IP	W	L	ERA	SO
Dennis Tankersley	17	51.1	1	4	8.06	39
Jason Middlebrook	12	35.1	1	3	5.09	28
Kevin Pickford	16	30.0	0	2	6.00	18
Mike Bynum	14	27.1	1	0	5.27	17
Clay Condrey	9	26.2	1	2	1.69	16
Ben Howard	3	10.2	0	1	9.28	10
Bobby Jones	4	9.2	0	0	6.52	7

==== Relief pitchers ====
Note: G = Games pitched; W = Wins; L = Losses; SV = Saves; ERA = Earned run average; SO = Strikeouts

Player	G	W	L	SV	ERA	SO
Trevor Hoffman	61	2	5	38	2.73	69
Jeremy Fikac	65	4	7	0	5.35	66
Steve Reed	40	2	4	1	1.98	36
Alan Embree	36	3	4	0	1.26	38
Mike Holtz	33	2	2	0	4.71	19
Brandon Villafuerte	31	1	2	1	1.41	25
Jason Boyd	23	1	0	0	7.94	18
Tom Davey	19	1	0	0	5.57	21
Jonathan Johnson	16	1	2	0	4.11	21
Jason Kershner	15	0	1	0	5.79	11
Rodney Myers	14	1	1	0	5.91	11
Kevin Walker	11	0	1	0	5.63	11
Doug Nickle	10	1	0	0	8.49	7
Matt DeWitt	5	0	1	0	1.23	5
Eric Cyr	5	0	1	0	10.50	4
Juan Moreno	4	0	0	0	7.50	3
J.J. Trujillo	4	0	1	0	10.13	3
David Lundquist	3	0	0	0	16.88	0
Jason Shiell	3	0	0	0	27.00	1
Jason Pearson	2	0	0	0	0.00	3
D'Angelo Jimenez	1	0	0	0	0.00	0
José Núñez	1	0	0	0	0.00	0

== Award winners ==
2002 Major League Baseball All-Star Game

- Trevor Hoffman

== Farm system ==
Level	Team	League	Manager
AAA	Portland Beavers	Pacific Coast League	Rick Sweet
AA	Mobile BayBears	Southern League	Craig Colbert
A	Lake Elsinore Storm	California League	George Hendrick
A	Fort Wayne Wizards	Midwest League	Tracy Woodson
A-Short Season	Eugene Emeralds	Northwest League	Jeff Gardner
Rookie	Idaho Falls Padres	Pioneer League	Don Werner
