= 2003 Kansas City Royals season =

2003 Kansas City Royals
- League: American League
- Division: Central
- Ballpark: Kauffman Stadium
- City: Kansas City, Missouri
- Record: 83–79 (.512)
- Divisional place: 3rd
- Owners: David Glass
- General managers: Allard Baird
- Managers: Tony Peña
- Television: KMCI; Royals Sports Television Network (Paul Splittorff, Bob Davis)
- Radio: KMBZ (Denny Matthews, Ryan Lefebvre, Fred White)

The 2003 Kansas City Royals season was the 35th season of the franchise, and their 31st season at Kauffman Stadium. It involved the Royals finishing third in the American League Central, with a record of 83 wins and 79 losses. It was the only winning season for the franchise between 1994 and 2013.

2003 was regarded as a hopeful season ("We Believe" was the slogan) for the Royals, as they began the season winning their first 9 games. The team spent 93 days in first place in the AL Central, but fell out of first place for the last time on August 31, and were eliminated from playoff contention on September 23.

== Offseason ==
- October 15, 2002: AJ Hinch was released by the Kansas City Royals.
- December 18, 2002: Buddy Carlyle was signed as a free agent with the Kansas City Royals.

== Regular season ==
=== Opening Day starters ===
- Michael Tucker – CF
- Joe Randa – 3B
- Mike Sweeney – 1B
- Raúl Ibañez – LF
- Brandon Berger – RF
- Ken Harvey – DH
- Ángel Berroa – SS
- Brent Mayne – C
- Carlos Febles – 2B

=== Season standings ===
AL Central
Team	W	L	Pct.	GB	Home	Road
Minnesota Twins	90	72	.556	—	48‍–‍33	42‍–‍39
Chicago White Sox	86	76	.531	4	51‍–‍30	35‍–‍46
Kansas City Royals	83	79	.512	7	40‍–‍40	43‍–‍39
Cleveland Indians	68	94	.420	22	38‍–‍43	30‍–‍51
Detroit Tigers	43	119	.265	47	23‍–‍58	20‍–‍61

=== Record vs. opponents ===
2003 American League record Source: MLB Standings Grid – 2003
Team	ANA	BAL	BOS	CWS	CLE	DET	KC	MIN	NYY	OAK	SEA	TB	TEX	TOR	NL
Anaheim	—	1–8	3–6	3–4	6–3	6–1	6–3	5–4	3–6	8–12	8–11	6–3	9–10	2–7	11–7
Baltimore	8–1	—	9–10	2–4	3–3	3–3	3–4	3–4	6–13–1	2–7	4–5	8–11	7–2	8–11	5–13
Boston	6–3	10–9	—	5–4	4–2	8–1	5–1	2–4	9–10	3–4	5–2	12–7	5–4	10–9	11–7
Chicago	4–3	4–2	4–5	—	11–8	11–8	11–8	9–10	4–2	4–5	2–7	3–3	3–4	6–3	10–8
Cleveland	3–6	3–3	2–4	8–11	—	12–7	6–13	9–10	2–5	3–6	3–6	5–2	4–5	2–4	6–12
Detroit	1–6	3–3	1–8	8–11	7–12	—	5–14	4–15	1–5	3–6	1–8	2–4	1–6	2–7	4–14
Kansas City	3–6	4–3	1–5	8–11	13–6	14–5	—	11–8	2–4	2–7	4–5	4–3	7–2	1–5	9–9
Minnesota	4–5	4–3	4–2	10–9	10–9	15–4	8–11	—	0–7	8–1	3–6	6–0	5–4	3–3	10–8
New York	6–3	13–6–1	10–9	2–4	5–2	5–1	4–2	7–0	—	3–6	5–4	14–5	4–5	10–9	13–5
Oakland	12–8	7–2	4–3	5–4	6–3	6–3	7–2	1–8	6–3	—	7–12	6–3	15–4	5–2	9–9
Seattle	11–8	5–4	2–5	7–2	6–3	8–1	5–4	6–3	4–5	12–7	—	4–5	10–10	3–4	10–8
Tampa Bay	3–6	11–8	7–12	3–3	2–5	4–2	3–4	0–6	5–14	3–6	5–4	—	3–6	11–8	3–15
Texas	10–9	2–7	4–5	4–3	5–4	6–1	2–7	4–5	5–4	4–15	10–10	6–3	—	5–4	4–14
Toronto	7–2	11–8	9–10	3–6	4–2	7–2	5–1	3–3	9–10	2–5	4–3	8–11	4–5	—	10–8

=== Roster ===
2003 Kansas City Royals
Roster
Pitchers: 31 Paul Abbott; 48 Jeremy Affeldt; 27,19 Brian Anderson; 55 Kevin Appier; 53 Miguel Asencio; 35 Ryan Bukvich; 59 D. J. Carrasco; 58 Rick DeHart; 55,27,57 Nate Field; 32 Chris George; 50 Jason Gilfillan; 41 Jimmy Gobble; 38 Jason Grimsley; 40 Runelvys Hernández; 52 Jeremy Hill; 43,33 Curtis Leskanic; 43 Al Levine; 25 José Lima; 37 Graeme Lloyd; 31 Albie Lopez; 39 Sean Lowe; 54 Mike MacDougal; 34 Darrell May; 57 Scott Mullen; 36 Kyle Snyder; 46 Brad Voyles; 56 Les Walrond; 51 Kris Wilson; 49 Jamey Wright	Catchers: 26 Mike DiFelice; 2 Brent Mayne; 11 Tom Prince; Infielders: 14 Brent Abernathy; 4 Ángel Berroa; 33 Morgan Burkhart; 1 Gookie Dawkins; 3 Carlos Febles; 28 Ken Harvey; 7 Mendy López; 23 Julius Matos; 19,27 Jarrod Patterson; 16 Joe Randa; 12 Desi Relaford	Outfielders: 15 Carlos Beltrán; 30 Brandon Berger; 8 Dee Brown; 9 David DeJesus; 45 Aaron Guiel; 18 Raúl Ibañez; 25 Rontrez Johnson; 24 Michael Tucker; 14 Rondell White; Designated Hitters: 29 Mike Sweeney	Manager: 6 Tony Peña; Coaches: 47 John Cumberland (pitching); 21 Tom Gamboa (first base); 13 John Mizerock (third base); 44 Jeff Pentland (hitting); 17 Luis Silverio (bullpen)

== Player stats ==
=== Batting ===
==== Starters by position ====
Note: Pos = Position; G = Games played; AB = At bats; H = Hits; Avg. = Batting average; HR = Home runs; RBI = Runs batted in

Pos	Player	G	AB	H	Avg.	HR	RBI
C	Brent Mayne	113	372	91	.245	6	36
1B	Ken Harvey	135	485	129	.266	13	64
2B	Desi Relaford	141	500	127	.254	8	59
SS	Ángel Berroa	158	567	163	.287	17	73
3B	Joe Randa	131	502	146	.291	16	72
LF	Raúl Ibañez	157	608	179	.294	18	90
CF	Carlos Beltrán	141	521	160	.307	26	100
RF	Aaron Guiel	99	354	98	.277	15	52
DH	Mike Sweeney	108	392	115	.293	16	83

==== Other batters ====
Note: G = Games played; AB = At bats; H = Hits; Avg. = Batting average; HR = Home runs; RBI = Runs batted in

Player	G	AB	H	Avg.	HR	RBI
Michael Tucker	104	389	102	.262	13	55
Carlos Febles	74	196	46	.235	0	11
Mike Difelice	62	189	48	.254	3	25
Dee Brown	50	132	30	.227	2	14
Mendy López	52	94	26	.277	3	11
Rondell White	22	75	26	.347	4	21
Julius Matos	28	57	15	.263	2	7
Brandon Berger	13	32	7	.219	0	3
Brent Abernathy	10	27	2	.074	0	0
Jarrod Patterson	13	22	4	.182	0	0
Morgan Burkhart	6	15	3	.200	0	1
Tom Prince	8	8	2	.250	0	1
David DeJesus	12	7	2	.286	0	0
Rontrez Johnson	8	3	1	.333	0	0
Travis Dawkins	3	2	0	.000	0	0

=== Pitching ===
==== Starting pitchers ====
Note: G = Games pitched; IP = Innings pitched; W = Wins; L = Losses; ERA = Earned run average; SO = Strikeouts

Player	G	IP	W	L	ERA	SO
Darrell May	35	210.0	10	8	3.77	115
Chris George	18	93.2	9	6	7.11	39
Runelvys Hernández	16	91.2	7	5	4.61	48
Kyle Snyder	15	85.1	1	6	5.17	39
José Lima	14	73.1	8	3	4.91	32
Jimmy Gobble	9	52.2	4	5	4.61	31
Brian Anderson	7	49.2	5	1	3.99	15
Miguel Asencio	8	48.1	2	1	5.21	27
Paul Abbott	10	47.2	1	2	5.29	32
Jamey Wright	4	25.1	1	2	4.26	19
Kevin Appier	4	19.0	1	2	4.26	5

==== Other pitchers ====
Note: G = Games pitched; IP = Innings pitched; W = Wins; L = Losses; ERA = Earned run average; SO = Strikeouts

Player	G	IP	W	L	ERA	SO
Jeremy Affeldt	36	126.0	7	6	3.93	98
Kris Wilson	29	72.2	6	3	5.33	42
Brad Voyles	11	31.1	0	2	7.18	24

==== Relief pitchers ====
Note: G = Games pitched; W = Wins; L = Losses; SV = Saves; ERA = Earned run average; SO = Strikeouts

Player	G	W	L	SV	ERA	SO
Mike MacDougal	68	3	5	27	4.08	57
Jason Grimsley	76	2	6	0	5.16	58
D.J. Carrasco	50	6	5	2	4.82	57
Sean Lowe	28	1	1	0	6.25	28
Curt Leskanic	27	1	0	2	1.73	22
Nate Field	19	1	1	0	4.15	19
Al Levine	18	0	1	1	2.53	5
Graeme Lloyd	16	0	2	0	10.95	8
Albie Lopez	15	4	2	0	12.71	15
Jason Gilfillan	13	2	0	0	7.71	12
Ryan Bukvich	9	1	0	0	9.58	8
Les Walrond	7	0	2	0	10.13	6
Rick DeHart	4	0	2	0	13.50	1
Scott Mullen	2	0	0	0	16.62	3
Jeremy Hill	1	0	0	0	0.00	0

== Farm system ==
Level	Team	League	Manager
AAA	Omaha Royals	Pacific Coast League	Mike Jirschele
AA	Wichita Wranglers	Texas League	Keith Bodie
A	Wilmington Blue Rocks	Carolina League	Billy Gardner Jr.
A	Burlington Bees	Midwest League	Joe Szekely
Rookie	AZL Royals Blue	Arizona League	Kevin Boles
Rookie	AZL Royals Gold	Arizona League	Lloyd Simmons

LEAGUE CHAMPIONS: AZL Royals Blue
