= Mike Darr =

American baseball player (1976-2002)

- Portrait from the back of Darr's 2002 Topps card
- Outfielder
- Born: March 21, 1976; Corona, California, U.S.
- Died: February 15, 2002 (aged 25); Peoria, Arizona, U.S.
- Batted: Left Threw: Right

MLB debut
- May 23, 1999, for the San Diego Padres

Last MLB appearance
- October 7, 2001, for the San Diego Padres

MLB statistics
- Batting average: .273
- Home runs: 5
- Runs batted in: 67
- Stats at Baseball Reference

Teams
- San Diego Padres (1999–2001)

Michael Curtis Darr (March 21, 1976 – February 15, 2002) was an American Major League Baseball (MLB) outfielder who played from 1999 through 2001 for the San Diego Padres. He was the son of Mike Darr, Sr., who pitched in one game for the Toronto Blue Jays in 1977. Darr batted left-handed but threw right-handed.

Born and raised in Corona, California, Darr was a second-round draft pick of the Detroit Tigers out of high school in 1994. Traded to the San Diego Padres before the 1997 season, he made his MLB debut with the team in 1999. After playing 58 games with the Padres in 2000, Darr was named the team's Opening Day right fielder in 2001, serving as the everyday player at that position until August.

During 2002 spring training, Darr and a passenger were killed in a single-car accident in Peoria, Arizona. Darr, the driver, had a blood alcohol content over the legal limit and was not wearing a seat belt. He was buried at the Crestlawn Memorial Park in Riverside, California; the Padres wore a black patch with the number 26 on it on their uniforms for the rest of the 2002 season in tribute.

== Early life ==
Darr was born on March 21, 1976, in Corona, California, to parents Mike Sr. and Debbie. His father pitched in one game for the Toronto Blue Jays in 1977. Darr also had a younger brother named Ryan who would be drafted by the St. Louis Cardinals in 1996 and play minor league baseball for five years. Growing up, Darr was good friends with Darrin Chiaverini, a future National Football League player and coach, and with Duane Johnson, the son of UCLA assistant football coach Don Johnson. At Corona High School, Darr played on the baseball team and earned All-California Interscholastic Federation honors. However, during his time in high school, Darr also began to struggle with substance abuse. He went to live with the Johnson family, and Duane's father took Darr to counseling, which helped him overcome his drug addiction. Darr graduated from high school in 1994 and married his high school sweetheart.

== Playing career ==
=== Detroit Tigers organization (1994–96) ===
The Detroit Tigers selected Darr in the second round of the 1994 MLB draft. He began his professional career with the Bristol Tigers of the rookie-level Appalachian League, batting .275 with 23 runs scored, 41 hits, 1 home run, and 18 runs batted in (RBI). Darr was a left-handed batter, though he threw right-handed. He advanced to the Fayetteville Generals of the Single-A South Atlantic League in 1995, batting .289 with 58 runs scored, 114 hits, 5 home runs, and 66 RBI in 112 games.

By 1996, Baseball America ranked Darr the seventh-best prospect in the Tigers organization. That season, he played in 85 games for the Lakeland Tigers of the Single-A advanced Florida State League, batting .248 with 26 runs scored, 77 hits, 0 home runs, and 38 RBI in 85 games. Late in 1997 spring training, he was traded to the San Diego Padres with Matt Skrmetta for Jody Reed on March 22.

=== San Diego Padres ===
==== Single-A advanced and Double-A (1997–98) ====
Darr remained at the Single-A advanced level with the Rancho Cucamonga Quakes of the California League in 1997. In one game for the Quakes, he had six hits in six at bats, a franchise record later tied by Jorbit Vivas in 2021. This season, Darr hit 15 home runs in 134 games. He ranked among the California League leaders with a .344 batting average (fourth behind Mike Stoner's .358, Mike Mitchell's .350, and Todd Wilson's .345), 104 runs scored (third behind Stoner's 115 and Tim Garland's 106), 179 hits (second behind Stoner's 203), and 94 RBI (seventh). He also stole 23 bases, getting caught only seven times. In recognition of Darr's strong season, the Padres named him their Minor League Player of the Year.

Not chosen as one of San Diego's Top 10 prospects by Baseball America in 1997, Darr was ranked by them as the sixth-best prospect in the Padres organization in 1998. He played 132 games with the Double-A Mobile BayBears of the Southern League. He hit 6 home runs and finished among the league leaders with a .310 batting average (eighth), 105 runs scored (second to Gabe Kapler's 113), 162 hits (fourth behind Kapler's 176, Carlos Lee's 166, and Robert Fick's 164), and 90 RBI (sixth). Darr ranked sixth in the league with 28 stolen bases, getting caught only eight times.

==== In the Minors and the Majors (1999–2000) ====
Darr was ranked the fourth-best prospect in the Padres organization by Baseball America in 1999, behind only Matt Clement, Ben Davis, and Junior Herndon. He began the season with the Triple-A Las Vegas Stars of the Pacific Coast League (PCL) but was promoted to the Padres in May. He made his major league debut on May 23, pinch-hitting for Rubén Rivera and striking out in the ninth inning of a 6–2 loss to the Cincinnati Reds. Starting in right field against the Arizona Diamondbacks the following day, he got his first major league hit, a single against Andy Benes in a 6–5 loss. Facing the Oakland Athletics in an interleague game on June 8, he hit his first major league home run, a solo affair against Tim Hudson as the Padres won 5–3. After making seven starts for San Diego in right field and batting .226, he was sent back to Las Vegas on June 13 when Tony Gwynn came off the disabled list. In 100 PCL games, he batted .298 with 57 runs scored, 114 hits, 10 home runs, 62 RBI, and 10 stolen bases in 13 attempts. The Padres again called him up in September, and he was used as a defensive replacement in right field for much of the final month of the major league season. In 25 games for San Diego, Darr batted .271 with 6 runs scored, 13 hits, 2 home runs, and 3 RBI. After the year, he was again named the Padres' Minor League Player of the Year.

In 2000, Darr fell to seventh in the Baseball America ranking of San Diego's top prospects. He played in five games in April 2000 for the Padres but spent most of the season's first four months with Las Vegas. In 91 games for Las Vegas, he batted .344 with 79 runs scored, 126 hits, 9 home runs, 65 RBI, and 13 stolen bases in 22 tries. He was recalled by San Diego after the July 31 trade deadline, as the Padres dealt Al Martin, creating a vacancy in the outfield. Darr started in right field for the Padres for the rest of the year. In his first game back, on August 1, he hit a two-run home run against Robert Person in San Diego's 10–9 win over the Philadelphia Phillies. On September 11, he stole home in a 7–2 win over the Colorado Rockies. Darr played 58 games for the Padres in his second major league season, batting .268 with 21 runs scored, 55 hits, 1 home run, 30 RBI, and 9 stolen bases in 10 attempts.

==== Full major league season (2001) ====
In 2001, Darr was an Opening Day starter for the first time in his career, playing right field for the Padres. From May 2 to 23, he was on the disabled list. On June 7, he had four hits and four RBI in a 10–7 victory over the San Francisco Giants. He began getting fewer starts in August and played sparingly in September, losing playing time to Bubba Trammell. Though he had skill defensively, Darr was not a power hitter. He hit only two home runs in 2001, albeit both game-winners. On August 16, his two-run, eighth-inning home run against Rick White of the New York Mets pushed San Diego to the lead in their 6–5 win. Against the Giants in the 10th inning of a tie game on September 22, he hit a pinch-hit walkoff home run against Brian Boehringer, giving San Diego a 4–3 win. The ball did not initially have enough distance to be a home run, but it bounced off of outfielder Calvin Murray's glove to go into the stands. Little did Darr realize that this would be his last hit. Darr appeared in 105 games during the season, compiling a .277 average with 2 home runs and 34 RBI.

== Personal life ==
Darr had a wife and two sons. Ther son Michael Jr. played right field at Corona High School, and threw for over 6,000 yards and 51 touchdowns as the school's quarterback.

== Death ==
On February 15, 2002, Darr was involved in a single-car accident in Peoria, Arizona, during spring training. He was the driver of the vehicle, and his blood alcohol content was 0.11 percent, over the legal limit of 0.08 percent. Riding in the car with Darr were Ben Howard, a minor league pitcher in the Padres organization, and Duane Johnson, Darr's childhood friend who had been helping Darr move into an apartment. Both Darr and Johnson, who were not wearing safety belts, were killed. Howard, who had his safety belt on, survived with only minor injuries.

More than 1,500 attended Darr's funeral, including nearly the entire Padres organization. Darr was buried at the Crestlawn Memorial Park in Riverside, California. During its 2002 season, the Padres wore a black circle patch with Darr's uniform number 26 in white on the right sleeve of their uniform.

Darr's manager with San Diego, Bruce Bochy, said Darr "was not just a good ballplayer. This young man was a person we all thought a lot about. A fun-loving guy, very well-liked by his teammates." Trevor Hoffman, the team's closer, said, "We've lost a special teammate, a special person. There are a lot of heavy hearts in the locker room." According to baseball historian Frank Russo, "He was known for a great sense of humor and intensity on the playing field, as well as his love of the game."

== See also ==
- List of baseball players who died during their careers
- List of second-generation Major League Baseball players
