= Julius Matos =

American baseball player (born 1974)

- Second baseman
- Born: December 12, 1974 (age 51); New York, New York, U.S.
- Batted: Right Threw: Right

MLB debut
- May 31, 2002, for the San Diego Padres

Last MLB appearance
- September 28, 2003, for the Kansas City Royals

MLB statistics
- Batting average: .244
- Hits: 59
- Home runs: 4
- Runs batted in: 26
- Stats at Baseball Reference

Teams
- San Diego Padres (2002); Kansas City Royals (2003)

Julius Matos (born December 12, 1974) is an American former professional baseball second baseman. He played in 76 games for the San Diego Padres during the 2002 San Diego Padres season and 28 games for the Kansas City Royals during the 2003 Kansas City Royals season.

== Professional career ==
=== Minor leagues ===
Matos was drafted by the Cleveland Indians in the 1994 Major League Baseball draft in the 16th round.

=== Major leagues ===
Matos was signed as a Free Agent with the San Diego Padres on December 6, 2001. He made his Major League debut on May 31, 2002, as a second baseman. On October 15, 2002, he was granted Free Agency.

Matos was signed by the Kansas City Royals on December 3, 2002.

== Coaching career ==
Matos will join the Double-A Trenton Thunder of the New York Yankees organization as their hitting coach in 2011.

He currently has his own baseball clinic, where he helps children of any age with hitting mechanics, located in New Port Richey, Florida.
