= Chris Holt (baseball coach) =

American baseball coach (born 1979)

Boston Red Sox – No. 59
- Coach
- Born: April 19, 1979 (age 47); Portland, Maine, U.S.
- Bats: Right Throws: Right
- Stats at Baseball Reference

Teams
- As coach: Baltimore Orioles (2021–2023); Boston Red Sox (2025–present)

Christopher Anthony Holt (born April 19, 1979) is an American professional baseball coach and former pitcher. He is currently the bullpen coach for the Boston Red Sox of Major League Baseball (MLB). He previously served as pitching coach for the Baltimore Orioles for three seasons.

== Baseball career ==
=== Playing career ===
Holt attended Saint Joseph's College of Maine and transferred to Flagler College, where he played college baseball as a pitcher. The Pittsburgh Pirates selected him in the 21st round of the 2002 MLB draft. He played at the Low–A level in 2002 for the Williamsport Crosscutters. Released by Pittsburgh in 2003, Holt pitched in Austria in 2004.

=== Amateur coaching ===
In 2005, Holt became a coach at Flagler College. He coached at Ponte Vedra High School from 2009 to 2011. He then quit his teaching job to focus on coaching full-time.

=== Houston Astros ===
Holt met Doug White of the Houston Astros organization in December 2012, which led to his hiring as a coach in the Astros organization in 2014.

=== Baltimore Orioles ===
In 2019, Mike Elias hired Holt for the Baltimore Orioles' organization as their minor-league pitching coordinator. Holt became the Orioles' major league pitching coach in 2021, while also carrying the title of director of pitching for the entire organization.

Following the 2023 season on October 25, 2023, the Orioles announced that Holt would not serve as their pitching coach for the 2024 season, but would maintain his duties as director of pitching to allow further development of pitching within the organization.

=== Boston Red Sox ===
On November 13, 2024, Holt was hired by the Boston Red Sox to serve as their bullpen coach.

== Personal life ==
Holt is married to Shana Holt; the couple have two children.

Sporting positions
Preceded by Kevin Walker	Boston Red Sox bullpen coach 2025–present	Succeeded by incumbent
