= Luther Gilyard =

American baseball player (1910–1976)

- First baseman
- Born: February 20, 1910; Fort Smith, Arkansas, U.S.
- Died: September 20, 1976 (aged 66); Detroit, Michigan, U.S.
- Batted: Right Threw: Right

Negro league baseball debut
- 1937, for the St. Louis Stars

Last appearance
- 1942, for the Birmingham Black Barons
- Stats at Baseball Reference

Teams
- St. Louis Stars (1937); Chicago American Giants (1937–1939); Birmingham Black Barons (1942)

Luther Gilyard Jr. (February 20, 1910 – September 20, 1976), sometimes listed as "Gillard", was an American Negro league baseball first baseman in the 1930s and 1940s.

A native of Fort Smith, Arkansas, Gilyard made his Negro leagues debut in 1937 with the St. Louis Stars and Chicago American Giants. He played for Chicago again the following two seasons, and finished his career in 1942 with the Birmingham Black Barons. Gilyard died in Detroit, Michigan in 1976 at age 66.
