= Bob Detherage =

American baseball player (born 1954)

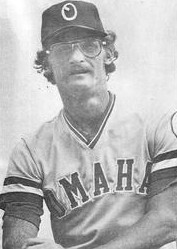
- Detherage in 1980
- Outfielder
- Born: September 20, 1954 (age 71); Springfield, Missouri, U.S.
- Batted: Right Threw: Right

MLB debut
- April 11, 1980, for the Kansas City Royals

Last MLB appearance
- May 14, 1980, for the Kansas City Royals

MLB statistics
- Batting average: .308
- Home runs: 1
- Runs batted in: 7
- Stats at Baseball Reference

Teams
- Kansas City Royals (1980)

Robert Wayne Detherage (born September 20, 1954) is an American former Major League Baseball player. Detherage played for Kansas City Royals in the 1980 season. In twenty career games, he had eight hits in 26 at-bats with seven RBIs. He played the Outfield in all of his games.

Detherage was drafted originally by the Los Angeles Dodgers in 1972.
