= Jason Gilfillan =

American baseball player (born 1976)

- Pitcher
- Born: August 31, 1976 (age 49); Shelby, North Carolina, U.S.
- Batted: Right Threw: Right

MLB debut
- May 16, 2003, for the Kansas City Royals

Last MLB appearance
- June 29, 2003, for the Kansas City Royals

MLB statistics
- Win–loss record: 2–0
- Earned run average: 7.71
- Strikeouts: 12
- Stats at Baseball Reference

Teams
- Kansas City Royals (2003)

Jason Edward Gilfillan (born August 31, 1976) is a former Major League Baseball pitcher who played for one season. He pitched in 13 games for the Kansas City Royals during the 2003 season.
