= Jason Pearson (baseball) =

American baseball player (born 1975)

- Pitcher
- Born: December 29, 1975 (age 50); Freeport, Illinois, U.S.
- Batted: Left Threw: Left

MLB debut
- June 4, 2002, for the San Diego Padres

Last MLB appearance
- August 20, 2003, for the St. Louis Cardinals

MLB statistics
- Win–loss record: 0–0
- Earned run average: 23.62
- Strikeouts: 4
- Stats at Baseball Reference

Teams
- San Diego Padres (2002); St. Louis Cardinals (2003)

Jason John Pearson (born December 29, 1975) is an American former professional baseball pitcher. He played in Major League Baseball (MLB) for the San Diego Padres in 2002 and the St. Louis Cardinals in 2003. Listed at 6 feet 0 inches (1.83 m) and 195 pounds (88 kg), he threw and batted left-handed.

== Biography ==
Pearson attended Freeport High School in Freeport, Illinois, and Illinois State University.

Pearson was signed as an undrafted free agent by the Florida Marlins in June 1998. He played minor league baseball during 1998 and from 2001 to 2006; he played independent baseball in 1999, 2000, 2005, and from 2008 to 2010. He appeared in 288 minor league games and 166 independent league games.

Pearson pitched in four major league games. In June 2002, he made two relief appearances for the San Diego Padres, pitching a total of 1 2/3 scoreless innings while allowing one hit and striking out three batters. In August 2003, he made two relief appearances for the St. Louis Cardinals, pitching a total of one inning while allowing seven runs on four hits and three walks while striking out one batter. Overall, Pearson pitched 2 2/3 innings in the major leagues while allowing seven runs, for a 23.62 earned run average (ERA).
