= Rontrez Johnson =

American baseball player (born 1976)

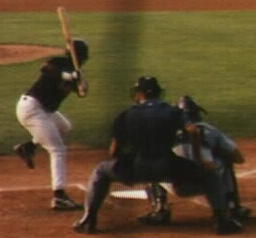
- Johnson (left) with the Michigan Battle Cats in 1997
- Outfielder
- Born: December 8, 1976 (age 49); Marshall, Texas, U.S.
- Batted: Right Threw: Right

MLB debut
- March 31, 2003, for the Kansas City Royals

Last MLB appearance
- April 15, 2003, for the Kansas City Royals

MLB statistics
- Batting average: .333
- At-bats: 3
- Games played: 8
- Stats at Baseball Reference

Teams
- Kansas City Royals (2003)

Rontrez DeMon Johnson (born December 8, 1976) is an American former Major League Baseball outfielder who played for one season. He played in eight games for the Kansas City Royals during the 2003 season.

Johnson was selected out of Marshall High School by the Boston Red Sox in the sixteenth round of the 1995 Major League Baseball draft. Johnson signed as a free agent with the Kansas City Royals before the 2002 season. During the 2002–03, he changed employers three times. He signed with the Texas Rangers in October 2002, was selected by the Oakland Athletics in the Rule 5 draft in December 2002 and selected off waivers by the Royals in April 2003.

He made his Major League debut in the second game of the 2003 season at Kauffman Stadium as a defensive replacement for pinch hitter Desi Relaford. He appeared in seven more games that season, largely as a pinch runner. He recorded his only Major League hit on April 14 against Chad Paronto of the Cleveland Indians at Jacobs Field.

On April 18, 2003, he was returned by the Royals to the Rangers. On July 14, the Rangers released him. He signed with the Atlanta Braves on July 18, 2003, and played the remainder of the year in their farm system before being released on October 15.

Johnson spent the following two seasons playing in the Mexican League and the Mexican Pacific League. The 2008 season was his final in professional baseball. He played for the Schaumburg Flyers of the independent Northern League.

As of August 2015, Johnson was living in Texas and owned a trucking company.
