= Ben Howard (baseball) =

American baseball player (born 1979)

- Pitcher
- Born: January 15, 1979 (age 47); Danville, Illinois, U.S.
- Batted: Right Threw: Right

MLB debut
- April 28, 2002, for the San Diego Padres

Last MLB appearance
- October 1, 2004, for the Florida Marlins

MLB statistics
- Win–loss record: 2–5
- Earned run average: 5.20
- Strikeouts: 67
- Stats at Baseball Reference

Teams
- San Diego Padres (2002–2003); Florida Marlins (2004)

Benjamin Richard Howard (born January 15, 1979) is an American former professional baseball pitcher. Howard played in Major League Baseball for the San Diego Padres in 2002 and 2003 and for the Florida Marlins in 2004.

== Career ==
Howard graduated from Jackson Central-Merry High School in Jackson, Tennessee, in 1997. The San Diego Padres selected him in the second round of the 1997 MLB draft. The Padres did not add Howard to their 40-man roster after the 2000 season, leaving him exposed in the Rule 5 draft. He was not chosen. In 2001, Howard pitched for the Lake Elsinore Storm of the Class A-Advanced California League, and the Mobile BayBears of the Class AA Southern League. While he pitched for Lake Elsinore, pitching coach Darren Balsley helped Howard improve his pitching mechanics, decreasing the number of base on balls he permitted.

In 2002, while at spring training with the Padres, Howard was a passenger in a vehicle being driven by teammate Mike Darr when the vehicle was involved in a single-vehicle crash. Darr and another passenger, his friend Duane Johnson, were killed. Darr was driving under the influence of alcohol. He and Johnson, who was sitting in the front seat, were not wearing seatbelts and were ejected from the vehicle. Howard, sitting in the back seat, was wearing his seatbelt and suffered minor injuries.

Howard began the 2002 season with Mobile, and started for them on Opening Day against the Jackson Generals in Jackson, Tennessee. The Padres promoted Howard to the major leagues for the first time to make his debut on April 27, 2002, but the game was rained out. He made his debut the next day. Howard spent the 2002 and 2003 seasons with the San Diego Padres. He had a 1–3 win-loss record and a 3.63 ERA in six starts for the Padres in 2003, but spent the majority of the season with the Triple-A Portland Beavers, where he had a 7–9 win-loss record and a 4.55 ERA. The Padres traded Howard to the Florida Marlins for Blaine Neal on April 3, 2004.

Howard split the 2006 season between the Syracuse Chiefs, the Triple-A affiliate of the Toronto Blue Jays, and the Buffalo Bisons, the Triple-A affiliate of the Cleveland Indians. He was granted free agency by the Indians' on July 16, 2006. Howard spent all the 2007 season playing for the Iowa Cubs, the Triple-A affiliate of the Chicago Cubs. Howard signed a minor league contract with the Boston Red Sox in January 2008. After being released in late March, he was signed to a minor league contract with the Milwaukee Brewers and was assigned to their Triple-A affiliate, the Nashville Sounds. Howard was released on August 12, 2008, while playing for the Huntsville Stars of the Southern League.

== Personal life ==
After he retired, Howard returned to Jackson and had two children. He coaches in their coach-pitch softball league.
