= Brian Mazone =

- Relief pitcher
- Born: July 26, 1976 (age 48); Mission Viejo, California
- Bats: Left Throws: Left

KBO debut
- 2007, for the Samsung Lions

KBO statistics
- Win–loss record: 7–11
- ERA: 4.18

Teams
- Samsung Lions (2007)

Brian Keith Mazone (born July 26, 1976) is an American former professional baseball pitcher. He played in the KBO League for the Samsung Lions.

== Career ==
Mazone was signed as an undrafted free agent by the Atlanta Braves in 1998 straight out of the University of San Diego. He had played ball at San Dieguito Academy. He played one season in the Braves minor league system, with the Class A Eugene Emeralds. After playing 20 games with the Emeralds and performing poorly (1-6, 5.53 ERA) he was released.

In 1999 and 2000, he went to spring training with the Boston Red Sox and the Detroit Tigers respectively but failed to secure a spot. He consequently pitched for the Zion Pioneerzz of the independent Western League. He led the Western League in shutouts in 2000 and finished fifth in the league in complete games. He missed all of the 2001 season while recovering from an injury.

Mazone returned to action with the Joliet JackHammers of the Northern League in 2002, leading the league in starts, innings and strikeouts. He was picked up by the Milwaukee Brewers after the season and went 0-7 with their Class-A team before he was released and finished the year with Joliet.

In 2004 with Joliet, Mazone finished 1st in the Northern League in shutouts and ERA and 2nd in complete game. He was signed by the San Francisco Giants in August and assigned to AA, eventually finishing the season with the AAA Fresno Grizzlies. He remained in the Giants system in 2005 and then signed a minor league contract with the Philadelphia Phillies in 2006.

Mazone pitched in the Phillies system from 2006–2008, primarily at the AAA level. In 2006, he was selected as the "Most Spectacular Pitcher in Triple-A" by Minor League Baseball. Mazone was to start a game for the 2006 Philadelphia Phillies on September 5, but the game was rained out and the Phillies did not formally add him to their roster. "That's a tough thing to shake," Mazone said. "I was getting called up by the Phillies in 2006 to make a start [replacing Randy Wolf], and the game got rained out and they sent me back down without activating me. Randy came up to me here and apologized. Not that he did anything wrong, he just felt bad."

Mazone pitched briefly in 2007 with the Samsung Lions of the Korea Baseball Organization, and he was selected to the International League mid-season All-Star team in 2008.

He was signed by the Los Angeles Dodgers in 2009 and pitched for the AAA Albuquerque Isotopes. On June 30, he was traded back to the Philadelphia Phillies for future considerations. He became a free agent after the 2010 season.
