= Éric Cyr =

Canadian baseball player (born 1979)

- Pitcher
- Born: February 11, 1979 (age 47); Montreal, Quebec, Canada
- Batted: Right Threw: left

Professional debut
- MLB: June 23, 2002, for the San Diego Padres
- CPBL: March 25, 2006, for the Uni-President Lions

Last appearance
- MLB: July 2, 2002, for the San Diego Padres
- CPBL: August 6, 2006, for the Uni-President Lions

MLB statistics
- Win–loss record: 0–1
- Earned run average: 10.50
- Strikeouts: 4

CPBL statistics
- Win–loss record: 9–5
- Earned run average: 2.52
- Strikeouts: 97
- Stats at Baseball Reference

Teams
- San Diego Padres (2002); Uni-President Lions (2006)
Medals
Men's baseball
Representing Canada
World Junior Baseball Championship
Bronze medal – third place	1997 Moncton	Team

Éric Cyr (born February 11, 1979) is a Canadian former professional baseball pitcher. He previously played in Major League Baseball (MLB) for the San Diego Padres, as well as in the Chinese Professional Baseball League (CPBL) for the Uni-President Lions.

== Baseball career ==
Cyr graduated from Edouard Montpetit High School in Montreal and attended Seminole State College in Oklahoma.

He was drafted by the San Diego Padres in the 30th round of the 1998 MLB draft and signed with the Padres on May 31, 1999.

Cyr made his professional debut in 1999, splitting time between the Azl Padres and the Idaho Falls Chukars of the rookie leagues. He played with the Single-A Fort Wayne Wizards in 2000.

During the 2000–01 offseason, Cyr played winter ball in Australia. He was suspended at the beginning of the season due to an arrest.

In 2001, he played with Lake Elsinore Storm. With the Storm he had a terrific season, turning in a record of 7–4 with a 1.61 ERA in 21 appearances (16 starts) and striking out 131 batters while only walking 24.

He was promoted to the Double-A Mobile BayBears in 2002, where he was 4–6 with a 3.24 ERA in 14 starts before being promoted to Triple-A Portland.

He made his Major League Baseball debut for the Padres on June 23, 2002, against the New York Yankees, working one scoreless inning in relief. He played in 5 games that year, going 0–1 with an ERA of 10.50 in 6 innings of total work.

Cyr was claimed off waivers by the Anaheim Angels on March 5, 2003 and pitched briefly for the Angels Double-A team in Arkansas before the Angeles waived him and he was claimed by the Cincinnati Reds, who sent him to Chattanooga. After a short stint there, he was returned to the Angels.

Cyr pitched for both Arkansas and the Salt Lake Stingers in 2004 before leaving the Angels to take part in the 2004 Summer Olympics as part of Team Canada.

He also pitched for Salt Lake in 2005, accumulating a record of 5–5, 5.64 in 38 appearances, 9 starts.

He was on the 2006 Canadian WBC Roster. Shortly before attending the 2006 WBC, he signed with CPBL's Uni-President Lions in Taiwan. He departed the Uni-President Lions in September 2006, leaving a record of 9 wins (including 2 shutouts), 5 losses, and an ERA of 2.52, a WHIP of 1.23 in his 128.2 innings during the 2006 CPBL season.

After finishing with the Uni-President Lions, he started one game for the Quebec Capitales of the Canadian-American Association of Professional Baseball giving up only 4 hits and no walks in eight shut-out innings before quitting the team to join Team Canada at the qualifiers for the 2008 Olympic Games in Beijing, China.

In 2007, he signed a minor league contract with the Los Angeles Dodgers, compiling a record of 6–3 with a 3.18 ERA in 16 starts for the Jacksonville Suns before being promoted to the Las Vegas 51s, where he was 3–6 with a 5.56 ERA in 12 games, 11 as a starter.

He played winter ball in Venezuela during the off-season and signed a minor league contract with the Texas Rangers for 2008, but was released before the start of the season and signed with the Seattle Mariners; he was assigned to their Triple-A affiliate, the Tacoma Rainiers, but was released on May 2, 2008. After a stint pitching with Quebec of the Canadian American Baseball league, where he was named player of the week ending on May 25, 2008, he was again picked up by the Dodgers and assigned to the Inland Empire 66ers of San Bernardino and later promoted to the Las Vegas 51s. He became a free agent at the end of the season.

Early in 2009, he announced that he was planning on joining the Sherbrooke Expos a senior team in the Ligue de baseball senior élite du Québec.

As of December 2011, he was married to alpine skier Sara-Maude Boucher. Their son, Simon-Xavier, was born in 2008. He has another daughter with his first wife named Chloé Cyr.

== Sexual assault conviction and jail ==
In April 2001, Cyr turned himself into the Federal Bureau of Investigation and was charged with having had sex with a 15-year-old girl while on a Qantas flight from Australia to Los Angeles that January. In December 2001, he pleaded guilty in the United States District Court for the Central District of California to a misdemeanor charge of sexual contact with another without consent. He was sentenced to a year of probation and given credit for thirty days served in jail. In 2004, the woman, then 18, filed suit against Cyr, Qantas, the San Diego Padres and the Lake Elsinore Storm.
