= J. J. Trujillo =

American baseball player (born 1975)

- Pitcher
- Born: October 9, 1975 (age 51); Corpus Christi, Texas, U.S.
- Batted: Right Threw: Right

MLB debut
- June 11, 2002, for the San Diego Padres

Last MLB appearance
- June 20, 2002, for the San Diego Padres

MLB statistics
- Win–loss record: 0–1
- Earned run average: 10.12
- Strikeouts: 3
- Stats at Baseball Reference

Teams
- San Diego Padres (2002)

John "J. J." Trujillo (born October 9, 1975) is an American former Major League Baseball (MLB) pitcher. He appeared in four games for the San Diego Padres in 2002. In 2007 he pitched for the Newark Bears of the Atlantic League of Professional Baseball, before his contract was purchased by the Philadelphia Phillies who assigned him to Class A Clearwater of the Florida State League, helping them to the league championship. Trujillo then returned to the Bears, helping them to the Atlantic League championship, giving him two separate league championships in one year.

Trujillo is one of only two pitchers in major league history to surrender a game-ending home run to the first batter he faced in the majors. On June 11, 2002, he began the 10th inning of an interleague game against the Baltimore Orioles and promptly gave up a walk-off home run to Tony Batista.

He was born in Corpus Christi, Texas.
