= Rick DeHart =

American baseball player (born 1970)

- Pitcher
- Born: March 21, 1970 (age 55); Topeka, Kansas, U.S.
- Batted: Left Threw: Left

Professional debut
- MLB: July 16, 1997, for the Montreal Expos
- NPB: June 25, 1999, for the Hiroshima Toyo Carp

Last appearance
- NPB: July 11, 1999, for the Hiroshima Toyo Carp
- MLB: June 8, 2003, for the Kansas City Royals

MLB statistics
- Win–loss record: 2–3
- Earned run average: 6.14
- Strikeouts: 45
- Stats at Baseball Reference

Teams
- Montreal Expos (1997–1999); Hiroshima Toyo Carp (1999); Kansas City Royals (2003)

Richard Allen DeHart (born March 21, 1970) is an American former left-handed pitcher in Major League Baseball. He played for the Montreal Expos and Kansas City Royals during his career. After his playing days, he served as the pitching coach for the Kansas City T-Bones. Currently, he is a Recreational Supervisor at KJCC, Kansas Juvenile Correction Complex.
