= Kevin Walker (baseball) =

American baseball player (born 1976)

- Pitcher / Coach
- Born: September 20, 1976 (age 49); Irving, Texas, U.S.
- Batted: Left Threw: Left

ML debut
- April 14, 2000, for the San Diego Padres

Last MLB appearance
- July 9, 2005, for the Chicago White Sox

MLB statistics
- Win–loss record: 7–3
- Earned run average: 4.76
- Strikeouts: 95
- Stats at Baseball Reference

Teams
- As player: San Diego Padres (2000–2003); San Francisco Giants (2004); Chicago White Sox (2005); As coach: Boston Red Sox (2020–2024)

Kevin Michael Walker (born September 20, 1976) is an American former relief pitcher. He played in Major League Baseball (MLB) for the San Diego Padres, San Francisco Giants, and Chicago White Sox. The native of Irving, Texas, was listed as 6 feet 4 inches (1.93 m) tall and 190 pounds (86 kg) during his pitching career; he threw and batted left-handed. He most recently served as bullpen coach for the Boston Red Sox.

== Playing career ==
Walker attended Grand Prairie High School in Texas. He was drafted by the San Diego Padres in the sixth round of the 1995 MLB draft and made his major league debut on April 14, 2000. On March 31, 2004, Walker was claimed off waivers by the San Francisco Giants. He became a free agent after the season and signed with the Chicago White Sox on November 23, 2004. The White Sox were the final team he appeared in MLB games with.

Walker became a free agent again after the 2005 season and signed with the Texas Rangers on November 6, 2005. He became a free agent after the 2006 season and signed with the Houston Astros for 2007. A free agent yet again after the 2007 season, Walker signed with the Camden Riversharks of the independent Atlantic League on April 7, 2008, his 14th and last year as an active player.

Walker appeared in 122 MLB games during a total of six seasons with a 7–3 record and 4.76 earned run average (ERA). In 102 innings pitched, he gave up 84 hits and 63 bases on balls, with 95 strikeouts.

== Post-playing career ==
=== Boston Red Sox ===
After the 2008 season, Walker became a pitching coach in the farm system for the Boston Red Sox. He served with the Lowell Spinners (2009) Greenville Drive (2010), Salem Red Sox (2011–2014), Portland Sea Dogs (2015–2017) and Pawtucket Red Sox (2018–2019). On October 31, 2019, Walker was promoted to assistant pitching coach for the major-league Red Sox. On November 20, 2020, he was promoted to bullpen coach. On October 9, 2024, it was announced that Walker would not be retained on Boston's coaching staff.

=== Pittsburgh Pirates ===
In 2026, Walker was named assistant pitching coach for the Altoona Curve the Double-A affiliate of the Pittsburgh Pirates.

== Personal life ==
Walker and his family reside in Holtville, California.

Sporting positions
Preceded by Craig Bjornson	Boston Red Sox bullpen coach 2021–2024	Succeeded by Chris Holt
