= Alex Pelaez =

American baseball player and coach (born 1976)

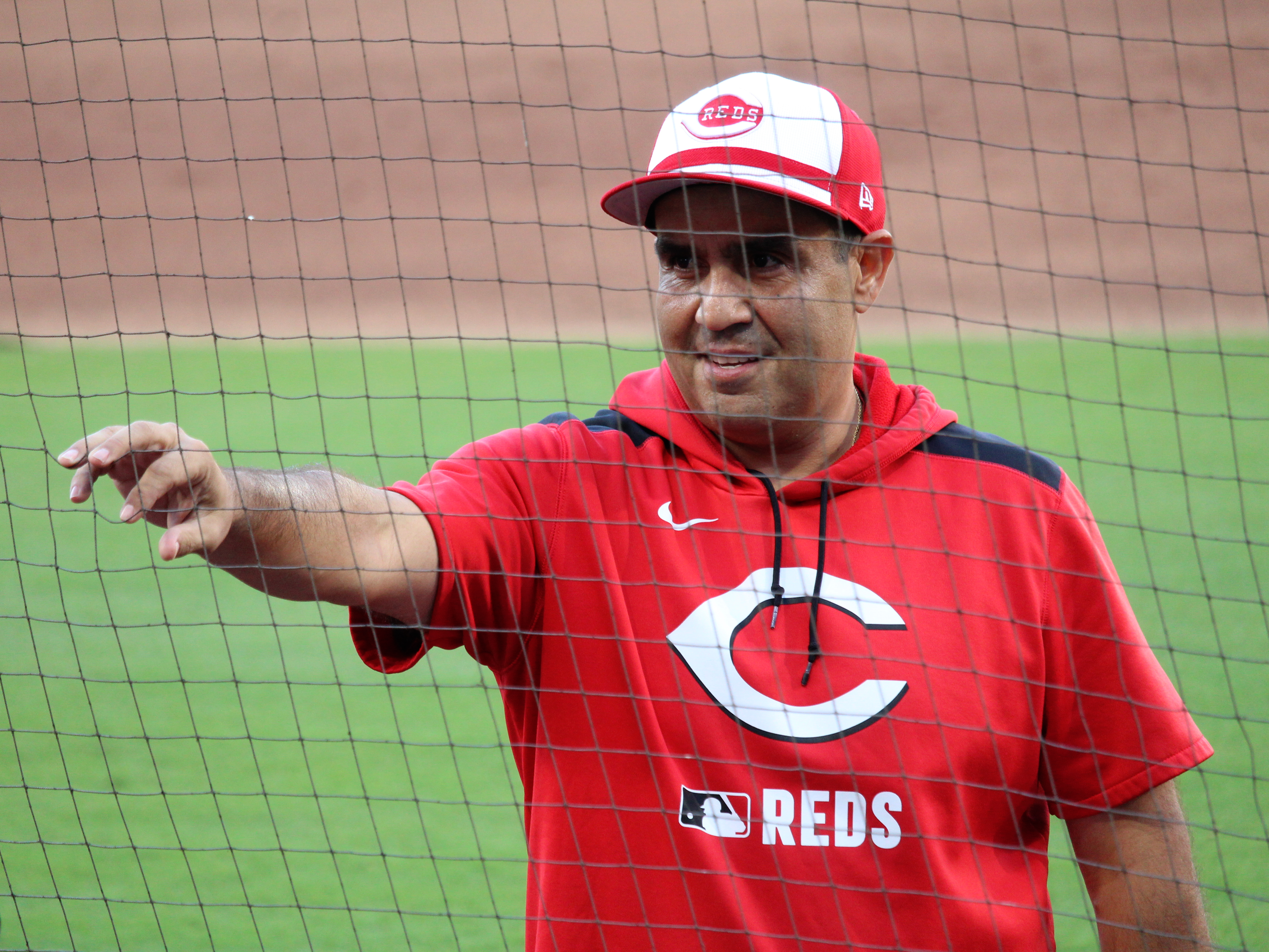
- Pelaez with the Cincinnati Reds in 2025

Cincinnati Reds – No. 93
- Infielder / coach
- Born: April 6, 1976 (age 49); San Diego, California, U.S.
- Batted: Right Threw: Right

MLB debut
- May 16, 2002, for the San Diego Padres

Last MLB appearance
- May 18, 2002, for the San Diego Padres

MLB statistics
- Games: 3
- At-bats: 8
- Hits: 2
- Stats at Baseball Reference

Teams
- As player: San Diego Padres (2002); As coach: Cincinnati Reds (2025–present)

Alejandro "Alex" Pelaez (born April 6, 1976) is an American professional baseball coach for the Cincinnati Reds of Major League Baseball (MLB). As a player, Pelaez played in three games for the San Diego Padres in the 2002 season. He had two hits in eight at-bats.

He was drafted by the Padres in the 42nd round of the 1998 amateur draft.

Pelaez is the former hitting coach for the Pensacola Blue Wahoos, a farm club affiliate of the Cincinnati Reds in the Southern League and current hitting coach for the Triple A Louisville Bats.
