= 2006 Chicago White Sox season =

2006 Chicago White Sox
- League: American League
- Division: Central
- Ballpark: U.S. Cellular Field
- City: Chicago
- Record: 90–72 (.556)
- Divisional place: 3rd
- Owners: Jerry Reinsdorf
- General managers: Kenny Williams
- Managers: Ozzie Guillén
- Television: WGN-TV/WCIU-TV; Comcast Sportsnet (Ken Harrelson, Darrin Jackson)
- Radio: WSCR (Chris Singleton, Ed Farmer); WRTO (AM) (Hector Molina)

The 2006 Chicago White Sox season was their first since winning the World Series the season before. They finished with a record of 90–72, good enough for third place in the American League Central, six games behind the champion Minnesota Twins.

== Offseason ==
- November 25, 2005: Jim Thome was traded by the Philadelphia Phillies with cash to the Chicago White Sox for a player to be named later, Aaron Rowand, and Daniel Haigwood (minors). The Chicago White Sox sent Gio González (minors) (December 8, 2005) to the Philadelphia Phillies to complete the trade.
- November 30, 2005: Paul Konerko was signed as a free agent with the Chicago White Sox.
- December 13, 2005: Rob Mackowiak was traded by the Pittsburgh Pirates to the Chicago White Sox for Damaso Marte.
- December 20, 2005: Javier Vázquez was traded by the Arizona Diamondbacks to the Chicago White Sox for Orlando Hernández, Luis Vizcaíno and Chris Young.
- January 19, 2006: Jorge Velandia and Agustín Montero was signed as a free agent with the Chicago White Sox.
- March 8, 2006: Jeff Bajenaru was traded by the Arizona Diamondbacks to the Chicago White Sox for Alex Cintrón.
- March 20, 2006: Joe Borchard was traded to the Seattle Mariners by the Chicago White Sox for Matt Thornton.

== Regular season ==
=== Season standings ===
AL Central
Team	W	L	Pct.	GB	Home	Road
Minnesota Twins	96	66	.593	—	54‍–‍27	42‍–‍39
Detroit Tigers	95	67	.586	1	46‍–‍35	49‍–‍32
Chicago White Sox	90	72	.556	6	49‍–‍32	41‍–‍40
Cleveland Indians	78	84	.481	18	44‍–‍37	34‍–‍47
Kansas City Royals	62	100	.383	34	34‍–‍47	28‍–‍53

=== Record vs. opponents ===
2006 American League record Source: MLB Standings Grid – 2006
Team	BAL	BOS	CWS	CLE	DET	KC	LAA	MIN	NYY	OAK	SEA	TB	TEX	TOR	NL
Baltimore	—	3–15	2–5	4–2	3–3	5–1	4–6	3–6	7–12	2–4	4–6	13–6	3–6	8–11	9–9
Boston	15–3	—	4–2	3–4	3–3	4–5	3–3	1–5	8–11	3–7	4–6	10–9	5–4	7–12	16–2
Chicago	5–2	2–4	—	8–11	12–7	11–8	6–3	9–10	2–4	3–3	5–4	3–3	5–5	5–4	14–4
Cleveland	2–4	4–3	11–8	—	6–13	10–8	4–5	8–11	3–4	3–6	4–5	6–1	5–4	4–2	8–10
Detroit	3–3	3–3	7–12	13–6	—	14–4	3–5	11–8	2–5	5–4	6–3	5–3	5–5	3–3	15–3
Kansas City	1–5	5–4	8–11	8–10	4–14	—	3–7	7–12	2–7	4–5	3–5	1–5	3–3	3–4	10–8
Los Angeles	6–4	3–3	3–6	5–4	5–3	7–3	—	4–2	6–4	11–8	10–9	7–2	11–8	4–6	7–11
Minnesota	6–3	5–1	10–9	11–8	8–11	12–7	2–4	—	3–3	6–4	5–3	6–1	4–5	2–5	16–2
New York	12–7	11–8	4–2	4–3	5–2	7–2	4–6	3–3	—	3–6	3–3	13–5	8–2	10–8	10–8
Oakland	4–2	7–3	3–3	6–3	4–5	5–4	8–11	4–6	6–3	—	17–2	6–3	9–10	6–4	8–10
Seattle	6–4	6–4	4–5	5–4	3–6	5–3	9–10	3–5	3–3	2–17	—	6–3	8–11	4–5	14–4
Tampa Bay	6–13	9–10	3–3	1–6	3–5	5–1	2–7	1–6	5–13	3–6	3–6	—	3–6	6–12	11–7
Texas	6–3	4–5	5–5	4–5	5–5	3–3	8–11	5–4	2–8	10–9	11–8	6–3	—	4–2	7–11
Toronto	11–8	12–7	4–5	2–4	3–3	4–3	6–4	5–2	8–10	4–6	5–4	12–6	2–4	—	9–9

=== Game log ===
2006 White Sox game log
April (17–7) – home (9–3) – road (8–4)

#	Date	Time	Opponent	Score	Win	Loss	Save	Attendance	Record	Box
1	April 2	Indians	10–4	McCarthy (1–0)	Cabrera (0–1)		2:59	38,802	1–0	box
2	April 4	Indians	2–8	Westbrook (1–0)	García (0–1)		2:35	37,591	1–1	box
3	April 5	Indians	3 – 4 (11)	Graves (1–0)	Cotts (0–1)		4:00	33,586	1–2	box
4	April 7	@ Royals	7–11	Wood (1–0)	Garland (0–1)		2:51	23,204	1–3	box
5	April 8	@ Royals	3–4	Dessens (1–0)	Politte (0–1)	Burgos (1)	2:47	18,031	1–4	box
6	April 9	@ Royals	3–1	Buehrle (1–0)	Elarton (0–2)	Jenks (1)	2:17	15,094	2–4	box
7	April 10	@ Tigers	5–3	García (1–1)	Bonderman (1–1)	Jenks (2)	2:14	44,179	3–4	box
8	April 12	@ Tigers	4–3	Contreras (1–0)	Robertson (1–1)	Jenks (3)	2:14	12,601	3–4	box
9	April 13	@ Tigers	13–9	Garland (1–1)	Verlander (1–1)		3:12	14,027	5–4	box
10	April 14	Blue Jays	7–13	Walker (1–1)	Vázquez (0–1)		3:15	31,418	5–5	box
11	April 15	Blue Jays	4–2	Buehrle (2–0)	Burnett (0–1)	Jenks (4)	2:10	33,247	6–5	box
12	April 16	Blue Jays	6 – 4 (5)	García (2–1)	Towers (0–3)		1:36	27,337	7–5	box
13	April 17	Royals	9–0	Contreras (2–0)	Mays (0–2)		2:29	27,889	8–5	box
14	April 18	Royals	4–1	Garland (2–1)	Affeldt (0–2)	Jenks (5)	2:19	21,901	9–5	box
15	April 19	Royals	4–0	Vázquez (1–1)	Elarton (0–4)	Jenks (6)	2:34	25,459	10–5	box
16	April 21	Twins	7–1	Buehrle (3–0)	Santana (0–3)		2:29	31,287	11–5	box
17	April 22	Twins	9–2	García (3–1)	Radke (2–2)		3:01	38,955	12–5	box
18	April 23	Twins	7–3	Contreras (1–1)	Silva (1–3)		2:24	38,102	13–5	box
19	April 24	@ Mariners	3 – 4 (11)	Mateo (2–0)	McCarthy (1–1)		3:07	20,390	13–6	box
20	April 25	@ Mariners	13–3	Vázquez (2–1)	Piñeiro (2–2)	Logan (1)	2:46	20,451	14–6	box
21	April 26	@ Mariners	1–5	Washburn (2–3)	Buehrle (3–1)		2:12	23,848	14–7	box
22	April 28	@ Angels	8–5	García (4–1)	Weaver (1–3)		3:03	43,940	15–7	box
23	April 29	@ Angels	2–1	Contreras (4–0)	Santana (3–2)	Jenks (7)	2:24	40,065	16–7	box
24	April 30	@ Angels	6–5	Politte (1–1)	Shields (1–2)	Cotts (1)	2:35	44,135	17–7	box

May (16–12) – home (10–3) – road (6–9)

#	Date	Time	Opponent	Score	Win	Loss	Save	Attendance	Record	Box
25	May 1	@ Indians	8–6	Vázquez (3–1)	Lee (2–2)	Jenks (8)	3:44	17,845	18–7	box
26	May 2	@ Indians	1–7	Sabathia (1–0)	Buehrle (3–2)		2:38	22,630	18–8	box
27	May 3	Mariners	6 – 5 (11)	Jenks (1–0)	Woods (1–1)		3:16	27,569	19–8	box
28	May 4	Mariners	4–1	Contreras (5–0)	Hernández (1–4)	Jenks (9)	2:22	26,313	20–8	box
29	May 5	Royals	4–5	Dessens (2–1)	Jenks (1–1)	Burgos (4)	2:49	33,628	20–9	box
30	May 6	Royals	9–2	Vázquez (4–1)	Hernández (1–2)		2:38	38,593	21–9	box
31	May 7	Royals	3–2	McCarthy (2–1)	Dessens (2–2)	Jenks (10)	2:36	38,870	22–9	box
32	May 9	Angels	9–1	García (5–1)	Gregg (2–1)		2:34	36,539	23–9	box
33	May 10	Angels	5–12	Santana (3–1)	Haeger (0–1)	Rodríguez (10)	3:15	31,034	23–10	box
–	May 11	Angels	Postponed (rain), rescheduled for August 7							
34	May 12	@ Twins	1–10	Santana (4–3)	Garland (2–2)		2:26	30,473	23–11	box
35	May 13	@ Twins	4–8	Radke (4–4)	Vázquez (4–2)		2:52	33,021	23–12	box
36	May 14	@ Twins	9–7	Buehrle (4–2)	Silva (2–6)	Jenks (11)	3:01	21,796	24–12	box
37	May 15	@ Twins	7–3	García (6–1)	Baker (1–4)		3:04	19,413	25–12	box
38	May 16	@ Devil Rays	7–10	Kazmir (6–2)	McCarthy (2–2)	Walker (6)	3:11	11,566	25–13	box
39	May 17	@ Devil Rays	5–2	Garland (3–2)	Lugo (0–2)	Jenks (12)	2:39	11,607	26–13	box
40	May 18	@ Devil Rays	4–5	Hendrickson (3–2)	Vázquez (1–1)	Walker (7)	2:40	11,607	26–14	box
41	May 19	Cubs	6–1	Buehrle (5–2)	Maddux (5–3)		2:07	39,301	27–14	box
42	May 20	Cubs	7–0	García (7–1)	Hill (0–4)		2:38	39,387	28–14	box
43	May 21	Cubs	4–7	Zambrano (3–2)	Cotts (0–2)	Dempster (8)	2:40	38,645	28–15	box
44	May 22	Athletics	5 – 4 (10)	Jenks (2–1)	Flores (0–1)		3:06	39,354	29–15	box
45	May 23	Athletics	9–3	Vázquez (5–3)	Saarloos (2–2)		3:00	38,860	30–15	box
46	May 24	Athletics	3–2	Buehrle (6–2)	Haren (4–4)	Jenks (13)	2:31	38,434	31–15	box
47	May 26	@ Blue Jays	2–8	Lilly (5–4)	García (7–2)		2:43	22,729	31–16	box
48	May 27	@ Blue Jays	2 – 3 (11)	Schoeneweis (1–0)	Nelson (0–1)		3:32	30,063	31–17	box
49	May 28	@ Blue Jays	7–5	Garland (4–2)	Taubenheim (0–2)	Jenks (14)	2:50	35,277	32–17	box
50	May 29	@ Indians	11–0	Vázquez (6–3)	Lee (3–5)		2:48	31,803	33–17	box
51	May 30	@ Indians	3–4	Sabathia (5–1)	Buehrle (6–3)	Wickman (8)	2:43	20,944	33–18	box
52	May 31	@ Indians	0–5	Westbrook (5–3)	García (7–3)		2:46	21,671	33–19	box

June (19–8) – home (10–5) – road (9–3)

#	Date	Time	Opponent	Score	Win	Loss	Save	Attendance	Record	Box
53	June 1	@ Indians	8–12	Cabrera (1–1)	Thornton (0–1)		3:06	20,846	33–20	box
54	June 2	Rangers	3–4	Cordero (5–3)	McCarthy (2–3)	Otsuka (10)	2:54	32,802	33–21	box
55	June 3	Rangers	8–6	Vázquez (7–3)	Padilla (5–4)	Jenks (15)	3:20	38,697	34–21	box
56	June 4	Rangers	2–10	Rheinecker (2–0)	Buehrle (6–4)		2:26	35,915	34–22	box
57	June 6	Tigers	4–3	McCarthy (3–3)	Rodney (4–2)	Jenks (16)	2:42	37,192	35–22	box
58	June 7	Tigers	4–3	Contreras (6–0)	Verlander (7–4)	Jenks (17)	2:31	37,612	36–22	box
59	June 8	Tigers	2–6	Rogers (8–3)	Garland (4–3)		2:29	37,354	36–23	box
60	June 9	Indians	5–4	Thornton (1–1)	Betancourt (0–2)	Jenks (18)	2:50	33,909	37–23	box
61	June 10	Indians	4 – 3 (11)	Montero (1–0)	Wickman (1–1)		3:29	36,265	38–23	box
62	June 11	Indians	8–10	Westbrook (6–3)	García (7–4)	Wickman (9)	3:13	34,410	38–24	box
63	June 12	@ Rangers	8–3	Contreras (7–0)	Koronka (4–4)		2:40	29,182	39–24	box
64	June 13	@ Rangers	5–2	Garland (5–3)	Loe (3–6)	Jenks (19)	2:43	18,354	40–24	box
65	June 14	@ Rangers	0–8	Padilla (6–4)	Vázquez (7–4)		2:23	28,776	40–25	box
66	June 15	@ Rangers	8–2	Buehrle (7–4)	Rheinecker (2–1)		2:35	19,424	41–25	box
67	June 16	@ Reds	12–4	García (8–4)	Claussen (3–8)		2:37	32,673	42–25	box
68	June 17	@ Reds	8–6	Thornton (2–1)	Coffey (3–1)	Jenks (20)	3:09	39,451	43–25	box
69	June 18	@ Reds	8–1	Garland (6–3)	Harang (7–5)		2:35	31,569	44–25	box
70	June 20	Cardinals	20–6	Vázquez (8–4)	Mulder (6–5)		3:23	39,463	45–25	box
71	June 21	Cardinals	13–5	Buehrle (8–4)	Marquis (9–5)		2:20	37,897	46–25	box
72	June 22	Cardinals	1–0	García (9–4)	Reyes (1–1)	Jenks (21)	2:00	39,509	47–25	box
73	June 23	Astros	7–4	Contreras (8–0)	Pettitte (6–8)	Jenks (22)	2:50	37,700	48–25	box
74	June 24	Astros	6 – 5 (10)	Thornton (3–1)	Wheeler (1–5)		3:19	38,377	49–25	box
75	June 25	Astros	9 – 10 (13)	Nieve (3–3)	McCarthy (3–4)		4:25	38,516	49–26	box
76	June 27	@ Pirates	4–2	Buehrle (9–4)	Snell (7–5)	Jenks (23)	2:29	24,976	50–26	box
77	June 28	@ Pirates	4–3	García (10–4)	Maholm (2–7)	Jenks (24)	2:31	23,118	51–26	box
78	June 29	@ Pirates	6–7	Gonzalez (2–3)	Politte (1–2)		2:46	21,380	51–27	box
79	June 30	@ Cubs	6–2	Garland (7–3)	Marshall (4–7)		2:53	40,720	52–27	box

July (10–15) – home (5–8) – road (5–7)

#	Date	Time	Opponent	Score	Win	Loss	Save	Attendance	Record	Box
80	July 1	@ Cubs	8–6	Cotts (1–2)	Dempster (1–5)	Jenks (25)	3:05	41,027	53–27	box
81	July 2	@ Cubs	11–15	Zambrano (7–3)	Buehrle (9–5)	Howry (2)	2:53	40,919	53–28	box
82	July 3	Orioles	1–8	Bédard (9–6)	García (10–5)		2:24	38,829	53–29	box
83	July 4	Orioles	13–0	Contreras (9–0)	López (5–10)		2:48	37,300	54–29	box
84	July 5	Orioles	4–2	Garland (8–3)	Cabrera (4–6)	Jenks (26)	2:27	38,872	55–29	box
85	July 6	Orioles	11–8	Vázquez (9–4)	Ortiz (0–1)	Thornton (1)	3:03	35,266	56–29	box
86	July 7	Red Sox	2–7	Lester (4–0)	Buehrle (9–6)		2:46	39,355	56–30	box
87	July 8	Red Sox	6–9	Beckett (11–4)	Riske (0–2)	Papelbon (26)	3:50	39,497	56–31	box
88	July 9	Red Sox	6 – 5 (19)	Politte (2–2)	Seánez (2–1)		6:19	39,335	57–31	box
All-Star Break: AL defeats NL 4–3 at PNC Park
89	July 14	@ Yankees	5–6	Farnsworth (3–4)	Contreras (9–1)	Rivera (20)	2:41	55,069	57–32	box
90	July 15	@ Yankees	3–14	Mussina (11–3)	Buehrle (9–7)		3:00	55,019	57–33	box
91	July 16	@ Yankees	4–6	Wright (6–5)	García (10–6)	Rivera (21)	2:59	54,781	57–34	box
92	July 18	@ Tigers	7–1	Garland (9–3)	Robertson (8–6)		2:28	39,153	58–34	box
93	July 19	@ Tigers	2–5	Bonderman (10–4)	Vázquez (9–5)		2:36	39,693	58–35	box
94	July 20	@ Tigers	1–2	Zumaya (5–1)	Contreras (9–2)	Jones (25)	2:29	41,075	58–36	box
95	July 21	Rangers	3–10	Mahay (1–1)	Buehrle (9–8)	Bauer (2)	2:44	38,246	58–37	box
96	July 22	Rangers	1–3	Cordero (7–4)	Jenks (2–2)	Otsuka (26)	3:09	39,250	58–38	box
97	July 23	Rangers	5–0	Garland (10–3)	Padilla (10–6)		2:10	38,312	59–38	box
98	July 24	Twins	4–7	Radke (9–7)	Vázquez (9–6)		2:54	39,750	59–39	box
99	July 25	Twins	3–4	Santana (12–5)	Contreras (9–3)	Nathan (20)	2:37	36,984	59–40	box
100	July 26	Twins	4–7	Silva (6–9)	Buehrle (9–9)	Nathan (21)	2:49	39,387	59–41	box
101	July 28	@ Orioles	6–4	Thornton (4–1)	Ray (1–3)	Jenks (27)	2:56	35,382	60–41	box
102	July 29	@ Orioles	13–11	Garland (11–3)	Johnson (0–1)	Jenks (28)	3:46	34,598	61–41	box
103	July 30	@ Orioles	7–8	Rodríguez (1–1)	Jenks (2–3)		3:03	28,725	61–42	box
104	July 31	@ Royals	8–4	Contreras (10–3)	Hernández (2–6)		2:43	12,903	62–42	box

August (16–13) – home (10–7) – road (6–6)

#	Date	Time	Opponent	Score	Win	Loss	Save	Attendance	Record	Box
105	August 1	@ Royals	7 – 5 (10)	Riske (1–2)	Burgos (2–4)	Jenks (29)	3:20	11,609	63–42	box
106	August 2	@ Royals	3–7	Hudson (4–3)	García (10–7)		2:43	10,901	63–43	box
107	August 4	@ Blue Jays	6–4	Garland (12–3)	Halladay (13–3)	Jenks (30)	2:48	30,060	64–43	box
108	August 5	@ Blue Jays	7–1	Vázquez (10–6)	Rosario (1–2)		2:55	35,117	65–43	box
109	August 6	@ Blue Jays	3–7	Burnett (3–5)	Contreras (10–4)		2:38	36,453	65–44	box
110	August 7	Angels	3–6	Escobar (8–9)	Buehrle (9–10)	Rodríguez (27)	2:40	37,477	65–45	box
111	August 8	Yankees	6–5	Jenks (3–3)	Proctor (4–3)		3:47	39,872	66–45	box
112	August 9	Yankees	6–7	Johnson (12–9)	Garland (12–4)	Rivera (29)	3:17	39,406	66–46	box
113	August 10	Yankees	5–4	Vázquez (11–6)	Mussina (13–5)	Jenks (31)	3:26	39,289	67–46	box
114	August 11	Tigers	5–0	Contreras (11–4)	Verlander (14–5)		2:13	39,378	68–46	box
115	August 12	Tigers	4–3	MacDougal (1–0)	Rogers (11–6)	Jenks (32)	2:25	38,873	69–46	box
116	August 13	Tigers	7–3	García (11–7)	Miner (7–3)	Jenks (33)	3:01	38,931	70–46	box
117	August 14	Royals	12–2	Garland (13–4)	Redman (7–7)		2:37	39,938	71–46	box
118	August 15	Royals	2–4	Hernández (3–7)	Vázquez (11–7)	Nelson (1)	2:43	35,690	71–47	box
119	August 16	Royals	4–10	Bernero (1–0)	Contreras (11–5)		2:44	36,998	71–48	box
120	August 17	Royals	5–4	Buehrle (10–10)	Pérez (0–1)	Jenks (34)	2:43	37,839	72–48	box
121	August 18	@ Twins	3–7	Neshek (3–0)	García (11–8)		2:45	43,204	72–49	box
122	August 19	@ Twins	4–1	Garland (14–4)	Radke (12–9)	Jenks (35)	2:32	46,215	73–49	box
123	August 20	@ Twins	3–7	Santana (15–5)	Vázquez (11–8)		2:47	42,537	73–50	box
124	August 21	@ Tigers	1–7	Verlander (15–6)	Contreras (11–6)		2:29	39,278	73–51	box
125	August 22	@ Tigers	0–4	Rogers (13–6)	Buehrle (10–11)		2:28	39,361	73–52	box
126	August 23	@ Tigers	7–5	García (12–8)	Miner (7–5)	Jenks (36)	3:10	40,187	74–52	box
127	August 24	@ Tigers	10–0	Garland (15–4)	Robertson (11–10)		2:14	41,565	75–52	box
128	August 25	Twins	4–5	Crain (3–5)	MacDougal (1–1)	Nathan (27)	2:59	35,931	75–53	box
129	August 26	Twins	7 – 8 (11)	Eyre (1–0)	Thornton (4–2)		3:37	38,636	75–54	box
130	August 27	Twins	6–1	Buehrle (11–11)	Silva (8–12)		2:21	35,193	76–54	box
131	August 29	Devil Rays	12–9	García (13–8)	Fossum (6–6)	Jenks (37)	3:13	35,313	77–54	box
132	August 30	Devil Rays	5–4	Garland (16–4)	Meadows (2–5)	Jenks (38)	2:50	38,874	78–54	box
133	August 31	Devil Rays	3 – 5 (10)	Lugo (2–2)	McCarthy (3–5)	McClung (3)	3:06	33,178	78–55	box

September/October (12–17) – home (5–6) – road (7–11)

#	Date	Time	Opponent	Score	Win	Loss	Save	Attendance	Record	Box
134	September 1	@ Royals	5–7	Hernández (5–8)	Contreras (11–7)	Nelson (5)	2:58	15,501	78–56	box
135	September 2	@ Royals	5–3	Buehrle (12–11)	Pérez (1–3)	Jenks (39)	2:35	18,028	79–56	box
136	September 3	@ Royals	7–3	Redman (9–8)	García (13–9)		2:46	20,407	79–57	box
137	September 4	@ Red Sox	2 – 3 (10)	Timlin (6–4)	McCarthy (3–6)		3:07	36,206	79–58	box
138	September 5	@ Red Sox	0–1	Gabbard (1–3)	Vázquez (11–9)	Timlin (4)	2:13	35,912	79–59	box
139	September 6	@ Red Sox	8–1	Contreras (12–7)	Snyder (4–4)		2:47	35,923	80–59	box
140	September 7	Indians	1–9	Lee (12–10)	Buehrle (12–12)		3:01	34,671	80–60	box
141	September 8	Indians	7–6	Thornton (5–2)	Mastny (0–1)		3:17	37,188	81–60	box
142	September 9	Indians	10–8	Garland (17–4)	Carmona (1–9)	Thornton (2)	3:22	38,422	82–60	box
143	September 10	Indians	2–5	Sabathia (11–9)	McCarthy (3–7)		2:51	37,723	82–61	box
144	September 11	@ Angels	3–2	Contreras (13–7)	Lackey (11–10)	Jenks (40)	2:22	39,316	83–61	box
145	September 12	@ Angels	3 – 4 (11)	Carrasco (5–3)	Jenks (3–4)		3:03	39,304	83–62	box
146	September 13	@ Angels	9–0	García (14–9)	Saunders (5–3)		2:37	37,030	84–62	box
147	September 15	@ Athletics	2–4	Loaiza (10–8)	Garland (17–5)	Street (33)	2:48	26,809	84–63	box
148	September 16	@ Athletics	4–7	Zito (16–9)	Thornton (5–3)	Street (34)	2:53	32,169	84–64	box
149	September 17	@ Athletics	4–5	Blanton (16–11)	Contreras (13–8)	Duchscherer (9)	2:38	28,806	84–65	box
150	September 18	Tigers	2–8	Rogers (16–6)	Buehrle (12–13)		2:54	39,427	84–66	box
151	September 19	Tigers	7–0	García (15–9)	Verlander (16–9)		2:25	38,850	85–66	box
152	September 20	Tigers	2–6	Bonderman (13–8)	Garland (17–6)		2:53	38,971	85–67	box
153	September 21	Mariners	0–9	Woods (6–3)	Vázquez (11–10)		2:37	33,976	85–68	box
154	September 22	Mariners	6–11	Fruto (2–1)	Contreras (13–9)		3:23	37,557	85–69	box
155	September 23	Mariners	11–7	Haeger (1–1)	Piñeiro (8–13)		2:31	37,400	86–69	box
156	September 24	Mariners	12–7	García (16–9)	Feierabend (0–1)		2:58	37,518	87–69	box
157	September 25	@ Indians	1–14	Lee (13–11)	Garland (17–7)		2:32	15,913	87–70	box
158	September 26	@ Indians	0–6	Sabathia (12–11)	Vázquez (11–11)		2:19	16,080	87–71	box
159	September 27	@ Indians	2–1	McCarthy (4–7)	Carmona (1–10)	Haeger (1)	2:08	16,404	88–71	box
160	September 29	@ Twins	4–3	García (17–9)	Bonser (7–6)	Jenks (41)	2:27	45,439	89–71	box
161	September 30	@ Twins	6–3	Garland (18–7)	Garza (3–6)		2:34	46,219	90–71	box
162	October 1	@ Twins	1–5	Silva (11–15)	Vázquez (11–12)		2:56	45,182	90–72	box

=== Transactions ===
- April 1, 2006: Ernie Young was signed as a free agent with the Chicago White Sox.
- May 2, 2006: Jeff Nelson was signed as a free agent with the Chicago White Sox.
- June 15, 2006: David Riske was traded by the Boston Red Sox to the Chicago White Sox for Javier Lopez.
- July 20, 2006: Cliff Politte was released by the Chicago White Sox.
- July 23, 2006: Sandy Alomar Jr. was traded by the Los Angeles Dodgers to the Chicago White Sox for B. J. LaMura (minors).

=== Roster ===
2006 Chicago White Sox
Roster
Pitchers: 56 Mark Buehrle; 52 José Contreras; 46 Neal Cotts; 34 Freddy García; 20 Jon Garland; 40 Charlie Haeger; 32 Dustin Hermanson; 45 Bobby Jenks; 57 Boone Logan; 47 Mike MacDougal; 55 Brandon McCarthy; 65 Agustín Montero; 43 Jeff Nelson; 18 Cliff Politte; 54 David Riske; 37 Matt Thornton; 50 Sean Tracey; 33 Javier Vázquez	Catchers: 26 Sandy Alomar Jr.; 12 A. J. Pierzynski; 39 Chris Stewart; 36 Chris Widger; Infielders: 8 Alex Cintrón; 24 Joe Crede; 27 Josh Fields; 17 Ross Gload; 15 Tadahito Iguchi; 14 Paul Konerko; 25 Jim Thome; 5 Juan Uribe	Outfielders: 44 Brian Anderson; 23 Jermaine Dye; 10 Rob Mackowiak; 7 Jerry Owens; 38 Pablo Ozuna; 22 Scott Podsednik; 36 Ryan Sweeney	Manager: 13 Ozzie Guillén; Coaches: 3 Harold Baines (bench); 21 Don Cooper (pitching); 28 Joey Cora (third base); 53 Art Kusnyer (bullpen); 30 Tim Raines (first base); 29 Greg Walker (hitting)

=== Opening Day lineup ===
- Scott Podsednik, LF
- Tadahito Iguchi, 2B
- Jim Thome, DH
- Paul Konerko, 1B
- Jermaine Dye, RF
- A. J. Pierzynski, C
- Joe Crede, 3B
- Juan Uribe, SS
- Brian Anderson, CF
- José Contreras, P

== Player stats ==
=== Batting ===
Note: G = Games played; AB = At bats; R = Runs scored; H = Hits; 2B = Doubles; 3B = Triples; HR = Home runs; RBI = Runs batted in; BB = Base on balls; SO = Strikeouts; AVG = Batting average; SB = Stolen bases

Player	G	AB	R	H	2B	3B	HR	RBI	BB	SO	AVG	SB
Sandy Alomar Jr., C	19	46	5	10	3	0	1	3	7	35	.217	0
Brian Anderson, CF	134	365	46	82	23	1	8	33	30	90	.225	4
Mark Buehrle, P	32	4	0	0	0	0	0	0	0	1	.000	0
Alex Cintrón, SS, 2B	91	288	35	82	10	3	5	41	10	35	.285	10
José Contreras, P	30	4	1	0	0	0	0	0	2	2	.000	0
Joe Crede, 3B	150	544	76	154	31	0	30	94	28	58	.283	0
Jermaine Dye, RF	146	539	103	170	27	3	44	120	59	118	.315	7
Josh Fields, 3B, LF	11	20	4	3	2	0	1	2	5	8	.150	0
Freddy García, P	33	5	0	1	0	0	0	0	0	2	.200	0
Jon Garland, P	33	5	2	1	0	0	1	2	0	3	.200	0
Ross Gload, OF, 1B	77	156	22	51	8	2	3	18	6	15	.327	6
Tadahito Iguchi, 2B	138	555	97	156	24	0	18	67	59	110	.281	11
Paul Konerko, 1B	152	566	97	177	30	0	35	113	60	104	.313	1
Rob Mackowiak, OF, 3B	112	255	31	74	12	1	5	23	28	59	.290	5
Brandon McCarthy, P	53	1	0	0	0	0	0	0	0	0	.200	0
Jerry Owens, OF	12	9	4	3	1	0	0	0	0	2	.333	1
Pablo Ozuna, OF, 2B	79	189	25	62	12	2	2	17	7	16	.328	6
A. J. Pierzynski, C	140	509	65	150	24	0	16	64	22	72	.295	1
Scott Podsednik, LF	139	524	86	137	27	6	3	45	54	96	.261	40
Chris Stewart, C	6	8	0	0	0	0	0	0	0	2	.000	0
Ryan Sweeney, OF	18	35	1	8	0	0	0	5	0	7	.229	0
Jim Thome, DH	143	490	108	141	26	0	42	109	107	147	.288	0
Juan Uribe, SS	132	463	53	109	28	2	21	71	13	82	.235	1
Javier Vázquez, P	33	1	1	1	0	0	0	0	0	0	1.000	0
Chris Widger, C	27	76	6	14	3	0	1	7	9	20	.184	0
Team totals	162	5657	868	1586	291	20	236	839	502	1056	.280	93

=== Pitching ===
Note: W = Wins; L = Losses; ERA = Earned run average; G = Games pitched; GS = Games started; SV = Saves; IP = Innings pitched; H = Hits allowed; R = Runs allowed; ER = Earned runs allowed; HR = Home runs allowed; BB = Walks allowed; K = Strikeouts

Player	W	L	ERA	G	GS	SV	IP	H	R	ER	HR	BB	K
Mark Buehrle	12	13	4.99	32	32	0	204.0	247	124	113	36	53	98
José Contreras	13	9	4.27	30	30	0	196.0	194	101	93	20	59	134
Neal Cotts	1	2	5.17	70	0	1	54.0	60	64	33	31	30	43
Freddy García	17	9	4.53	33	33	0	216.1	228	116	109	32	51	135
Jon Garland	18	7	4.51	33	32	0	211.1	247	112	106	26	45	112
Charlie Haeger	1	1	3.44	7	1	1	18.1	12	10	7	0	13	19
Dustin Hermanson	0	0	4.05	6	0	0	6.2	6	3	3	2	2	5
Bobby Jenks	3	4	4.00	67	0	41	69.2	66	32	31	5	41	80
Boone Logan	0	0	8.31	21	0	1	17.1	21	18	16	2	17	15
Mike MacDougal	1	1	1.80	25	0	0	25.0	19	5	5	1	6	19
Brandon McCarthy	4	7	4.68	53	2	0	84.2	77	44	44	17	42	69
Agustín Montero	1	0	5.14	11	0	0	14.0	15	10	8	3	2	7
Jeff Nelson	0	1	3.38	6	0	0	2.2	3	1	1	1	6	2
Cliff Politte	2	2	8.70	30	0	0	30.0	47	30	29	9	22	15
David Riske	1	1	3.93	33	0	0	34.1	32	16	15	4	15	23
Matt Thornton	5	3	3.33	63	0	2	54.0	46	20	20	5	25	49
Sean Tracey	0	0	3.38	7	0	0	8.0	4	3	3	2	5	3
Javier Vázquez	11	12	4.84	33	32	0	202.2	206	116	109	23	58	184
Team totals	90	72	4.61	162	162	46	1449.0	1534	794	743	200	492	1012

== Farm system ==
Level	Team	League	Manager
AAA	Charlotte Knights	International League	Razor Shines
AA	Birmingham Barons	Southern League	Chris Cron
A	Winston-Salem Warthogs	Carolina League	Rafael Santana
A	Kannapolis Intimidators	South Atlantic League	Omer Muñoz
Rookie	Bristol White Sox	Appalachian League	Nick Leyva
Rookie	Great Falls White Sox	Pioneer League	Bobby Tolan
