= 2006 Kansas City Royals season =

2006 Kansas City Royals
- League: American League
- Division: Central
- Ballpark: Kauffman Stadium
- City: Kansas City, Missouri
- Record: 62–100 (.383)
- Divisional place: 5th
- Owners: David Glass
- General managers: Allard Baird, Dayton Moore
- Managers: Buddy Bell
- Television: KMCI; Royals Sports Television Network (Ryan Lefebvre, Paul Splittorff, Denny Matthews, Bob Davis)
- Radio: WHB; KLRX (Denny Matthews, Ryan Lefebvre)

The 2006 Kansas City Royals season was the 38th season for the franchise, and their 34th at Kauffman Stadium. The Royals finished fifth in the American League Central with a record of 62 wins and 100 losses and missed the playoffs for the 21st consecutive season.

== Regular season ==
=== Season standings ===
AL Central
Team	W	L	Pct.	GB	Home	Road
Minnesota Twins	96	66	.593	—	54‍–‍27	42‍–‍39
Detroit Tigers	95	67	.586	1	46‍–‍35	49‍–‍32
Chicago White Sox	90	72	.556	6	49‍–‍32	41‍–‍40
Cleveland Indians	78	84	.481	18	44‍–‍37	34‍–‍47
Kansas City Royals	62	100	.383	34	34‍–‍47	28‍–‍53

=== Record vs. opponents ===
2006 American League record Source: MLB Standings Grid – 2006
Team	BAL	BOS	CWS	CLE	DET	KC	LAA	MIN	NYY	OAK	SEA	TB	TEX	TOR	NL
Baltimore	—	3–15	2–5	4–2	3–3	5–1	4–6	3–6	7–12	2–4	4–6	13–6	3–6	8–11	9–9
Boston	15–3	—	4–2	3–4	3–3	4–5	3–3	1–5	8–11	3–7	4–6	10–9	5–4	7–12	16–2
Chicago	5–2	2–4	—	8–11	12–7	11–8	6–3	9–10	2–4	3–3	5–4	3–3	5–5	5–4	14–4
Cleveland	2–4	4–3	11–8	—	6–13	10–8	4–5	8–11	3–4	3–6	4–5	6–1	5–4	4–2	8–10
Detroit	3–3	3–3	7–12	13–6	—	14–4	3–5	11–8	2–5	5–4	6–3	5–3	5–5	3–3	15–3
Kansas City	1–5	5–4	8–11	8–10	4–14	—	3–7	7–12	2–7	4–5	3–5	1–5	3–3	3–4	10–8
Los Angeles	6–4	3–3	3–6	5–4	5–3	7–3	—	4–2	6–4	11–8	10–9	7–2	11–8	4–6	7–11
Minnesota	6–3	5–1	10–9	11–8	8–11	12–7	2–4	—	3–3	6–4	5–3	6–1	4–5	2–5	16–2
New York	12–7	11–8	4–2	4–3	5–2	7–2	4–6	3–3	—	3–6	3–3	13–5	8–2	10–8	10–8
Oakland	4–2	7–3	3–3	6–3	4–5	5–4	8–11	4–6	6–3	—	17–2	6–3	9–10	6–4	8–10
Seattle	6–4	6–4	4–5	5–4	3–6	5–3	9–10	3–5	3–3	2–17	—	6–3	8–11	4–5	14–4
Tampa Bay	6–13	9–10	3–3	1–6	3–5	5–1	2–7	1–6	5–13	3–6	3–6	—	3–6	6–12	11–7
Texas	6–3	4–5	5–5	4–5	5–5	3–3	8–11	5–4	2–8	10–9	11–8	6–3	—	4–2	7–11
Toronto	11–8	12–7	4–5	2–4	3–3	4–3	6–4	5–2	8–10	4–6	5–4	12–6	2–4	—	9–9

=== Roster ===
2006 Kansas City Royals
Roster
Pitchers: 48 Jeremy Affeldt; 39 Steve Andrade; 27 Denny Bautista; 58 Adam Bernero; 38 Chris Booker; 47 Ryan Braun; 50 Ambiorix Burgos; 36 Jorge de la Rosa; 47 Elmer Dessens; 53 Joselo Díaz; 52 Scott Dohmann; 38 Brandon Duckworth; 37 Scott Elarton; 36 Seth Etherton; 41 Jimmy Gobble; 23 Zack Greinke; 40 Runelvys Hernández; 34 Luke Hudson; 22 Bobby Keppel; 54 Mike MacDougal; 22 Joe Mays; 55 Joe Nelson; 43 Leo Núñez; 57 Joel Peralta; 45 Odalis Pérez; 21 Mark Redman; 51 Andrew Sisco; 39 Kyle Snyder; 36 Steve Stemle; 56 Todd Wellemeyer; 46 Mike Wood	Catchers: 6 Paul Bako; 14 John Buck; 28 Paul Phillips; Infielders: 4 Ángel Berroa; 13 Andrés Blanco; 3 Esteban Germán; 2 Tony Graffanino; 15 Mark Grudzielanek; 30 Jeff Keppinger; 11 Doug Mientkiewicz; 7 Ángel Sánchez; 39 Ryan Shealy; 12 Matt Stairs; 24 Mark Teahen	Outfielders: 35 Emil Brown; 32 Shane Costa; 9 David DeJesus; 1 Joey Gathright; 45 Aaron Guiel; 22 Mitch Maier; 44 Kerry Robinson; 16 Reggie Sanders; Other batters: 7 Justin Huber; 29 Mike Sweeney	Manager: 25 Buddy Bell; Coaches: 8 Mike Barnett (hitting); 26 Andre David (hitting); 13 Bill Doran (bench); 18 Fred Kendall (bullpen); 33 Bob McClure (pitching); 49 Brian Poldberg (first base); 17 Luis Silverio (third base)

== Player stats ==
=== Batting ===
Note: G = Games played; AB = At bats; H = Hits; Avg. = Batting average; HR = Home runs; RBI = Runs batted in

Player	G	AB	H	Avg.	HR	RBI
Paul Bako C	56	153	32	.209	0	10
Ángel Berroa SS	132	474	111	.234	9	54
Emil Brown OF	147	527	151	.287	15	81
John Buck C	114	371	91	.245	11	50
Shane Costa OF	72	237	65	.274	3	27
David DeJesus OF	119	491	145	.295	8	56
Joey Gathright OF	134	383	91	.238	1	41
Esteban Germán 2B	106	279	91	.326	3	34
Tony Graffanino 3B	69	220	59	.268	5	32
Mark Grudzielanek 2B	134	548	163	.297	7	52
Doug Mientkiewicz 1B	91	314	89	.283	4	43
Reggie Sanders OF	88	325	80	.246	11	49
Ryan Shealy 1B	51	193	54	.280	7	36
Matt Stairs DH	77	226	59	.261	8	32
Mike Sweeney 1B	60	217	56	.258	8	33
Mark Teahen 3B	109	393	114	.290	18	69

==== Other batters ====
Note: G = Games played; AB = At bats; H = Hits; Avg. = Batting average; HR = Home runs; RBI = Runs batted in

Player	G	AB	H	Avg.	HR	RBI
Jeremy Affeldt P	3	2	0	.000	0	0
Andrés Blanco SS	33	87	21	.241	0	9
Brandon Duckworth P	2	3	1	.333	0	0
Scott Elarton P	2	3	1	.333	0	0
Aaron Guiel OF	19	50	11	.220	3	7
Justin Huber DH	5	10	2	.200	0	1
Bob Keppel P	2	2	0	.000	0	0
Jeff Keppinger 2B	22	60	16	.267	2	8
Mitch Maier OF	5	13	2	.154	0	0
Paul Phillips C	23	65	18	.277	1	5
Mark Redman P	1	1	0	.000	0	0
Kerry Robinson OF	18	64	17	.266	0	5
Ángel Sánchez SS	8	27	6	.222	0	1
Todd Wellemeyer P	4	2	0	.000	0	0
Mike Wood P	2	3	0	.000	0	0

Note: Pitchers batting data also included above

=== Starting and other pitchers ===
Note: G = Games pitched; IP = Innings pitched; W = Wins; L = Losses; ERA = Earned run average; SO = Strikeouts; CG = Complete games pitched; SHO = Shutouts

Player	G	IP	W	L	ERA	SO	CG	SHO
Jeremy Affeldt LHP	27	70.0	4	6	5.91	28	0	0
Denny Bautista RHP	8	35.0	0	2	5.66	22	0	0
Adam Bernero RHP	3	13.0	1	0	1.35	12	0	0
Jorge de la Rosa LHP	10	48.2	3	4	5.18	36	0	0
Brandon Duckworth RHP	10	45.2	1	5	6.11	27	0	0
Scott Elarton RHP	20	114.2	4	9	5.34	49	0	0
Seth Etherton RHP	2	7.2	1	1	9.39	4	0	0
Runelvys Hernández RHP	21	114.2	4	9	6.58	50	1	1
Luke Hudson RHP	26	102.0	7	6	5.12	64	0	0
Bobby Keppel RHP	8	34.1	0	4	5.50	20	0	0
Joe Mays RHP	6	23.2	0	4	10.27	9	0	0
Odalis Pérez LHP	12	67.0	2	4	5.64	48	0	0
Mark Redman LHP	29	167.0	11	10	5.71	76	2	1
Kyle Snyder RHP	1	2.0	0	0	22.50	2	0	0
Mike Wood RHP	23	64.2	3	3	5.71	29	0	0

==== Relief pitchers ====
Note: G = Games pitched; W = Wins; L = Losses; SV = Saves; ERA = Earned run average; SO = Strikeouts

Player	G	W	L	SV	ERA	SO
Ambiorix Burgos RHP	68	4	5	18	5.52	72
Andrew Sisco LHP	65	1	3	1	7.10	52
Joel Peralta RHP	64	1	3	1	4.40	57
Jimmy Gobble LHP	60	4	6	2	5.14	80
Elmer Dessens RHP	43	5	7	2	4.50	36
Joe Nelson RHP	43	1	1	9	4.43	44
Todd Wellemeyer RHP	28	1	2	1	3.63	37
Scott Dohmann RHP	21	1	3	0	7.99	22
Ryan Braun RHP	9	0	1	0	6.75	6
Juan Carlos Oviedo RHP	7	0	0	0	4.73	7
Steve Stemle RHP	5	0	1	0	15.00	0
Joselo Díaz RHP	4	0	0	0	10.80	3
Steve Andrade RHP	4	0	0	0	9.64	5
Mike MacDougal RHP	4	0	0	1	0.00	2
Zack Greinke RHP	3	1	0	0	4.26	5
Chris Booker RHP	1	0	0	0	54.00	0

== Farm system ==
Level	Team	League	Manager
AAA	Omaha Royals	Pacific Coast League	Mike Jirschele
AA	Wichita Wranglers	Texas League	Frank White
A	High Desert Mavericks	California League	Jeff Carter
A	Burlington Bees	Midwest League	Jim Gabella
Rookie	AZL Royals	Arizona League	Lloyd Simmons
Rookie	Idaho Falls Chukars	Pioneer League	Brian Rupp
