= 2006 New York Yankees season =

Season for the Major League Baseball team the New York Yankees

2006 New York Yankees
- American League East champions
- League: American League
- Division: East
- Ballpark: Yankee Stadium
- City: New York City
- Record: 97–65 (.599)
- Divisional place: 1st
- Owners: George Steinbrenner
- General managers: Brian Cashman
- Managers: Joe Torre
- Television: WWOR-TV; YES Network (Michael Kay, Jim Kaat, Ken Singleton, Bobby Murcer, Paul O'Neill, David Justice, Al Leiter, John Flaherty)
- Radio: WCBS (AM) (John Sterling, Suzyn Waldman ) WKDM (Francisco X. Rivera, Beto Villa)

The 2006 New York Yankees season was the 104th season for the New York Yankees franchise. The season finished with the Yankees winning the American League East. They were defeated in the ALDS by the Detroit Tigers, 3 games to 1.

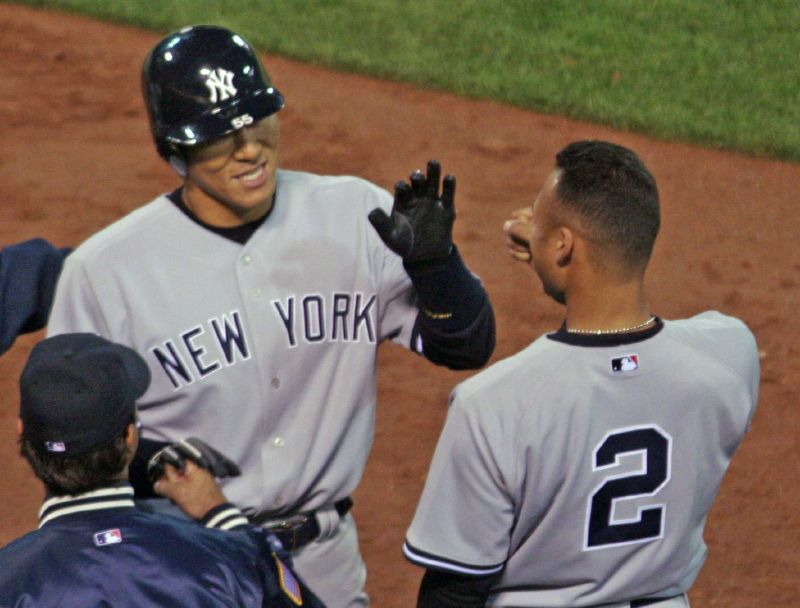
Hideki Matsui (left) and Derek Jeter (right) on April 3, 2006.

== Offseason ==
- January 3, 2006: Bernie Williams signed as a free agent with the New York Yankees.
- January 30, 2006: Ramiro Mendoza was signed as a free agent with the New York Yankees.
- Sal Fasano signed with the New York Yankees.

== Regular season ==
=== Season standings ===
AL East
Team	W	L	Pct.	GB	Home	Road
New York Yankees	97	65	.599	—	50‍–‍31	47‍–‍34
Toronto Blue Jays	87	75	.537	10	50‍–‍31	37‍–‍44
Boston Red Sox	86	76	.531	11	48‍–‍33	38‍–‍43
Baltimore Orioles	70	92	.432	27	40‍–‍41	30‍–‍51
Tampa Bay Devil Rays	61	101	.377	36	41‍–‍40	20‍–‍61

=== Record vs. opponents ===
2006 American League record Source: MLB Standings Grid – 2006
Team	BAL	BOS	CWS	CLE	DET	KC	LAA	MIN	NYY	OAK	SEA	TB	TEX	TOR	NL
Baltimore	—	3–15	2–5	4–2	3–3	5–1	4–6	3–6	7–12	2–4	4–6	13–6	3–6	8–11	9–9
Boston	15–3	—	4–2	3–4	3–3	4–5	3–3	1–5	8–11	3–7	4–6	10–9	5–4	7–12	16–2
Chicago	5–2	2–4	—	8–11	12–7	11–8	6–3	9–10	2–4	3–3	5–4	3–3	5–5	5–4	14–4
Cleveland	2–4	4–3	11–8	—	6–13	10–8	4–5	8–11	3–4	3–6	4–5	6–1	5–4	4–2	8–10
Detroit	3–3	3–3	7–12	13–6	—	14–4	3–5	11–8	2–5	5–4	6–3	5–3	5–5	3–3	15–3
Kansas City	1–5	5–4	8–11	8–10	4–14	—	3–7	7–12	2–7	4–5	3–5	1–5	3–3	3–4	10–8
Los Angeles	6–4	3–3	3–6	5–4	5–3	7–3	—	4–2	6–4	11–8	10–9	7–2	11–8	4–6	7–11
Minnesota	6–3	5–1	10–9	11–8	8–11	12–7	2–4	—	3–3	6–4	5–3	6–1	4–5	2–5	16–2
New York	12–7	11–8	4–2	4–3	5–2	7–2	4–6	3–3	—	3–6	3–3	13–5	8–2	10–8	10–8
Oakland	4–2	7–3	3–3	6–3	4–5	5–4	8–11	4–6	6–3	—	17–2	6–3	9–10	6–4	8–10
Seattle	6–4	6–4	4–5	5–4	3–6	5–3	9–10	3–5	3–3	2–17	—	6–3	8–11	4–5	14–4
Tampa Bay	6–13	9–10	3–3	1–6	3–5	5–1	2–7	1–6	5–13	3–6	3–6	—	3–6	6–12	11–7
Texas	6–3	4–5	5–5	4–5	5–5	3–3	8–11	5–4	2–8	10–9	11–8	6–3	—	4–2	7–11
Toronto	11–8	12–7	4–5	2–4	3–3	4–3	6–4	5–2	8–10	4–6	5–4	12–6	2–4	—	9–9

=== Transactions ===
- June 6, 2006: Ian Kennedy was drafted by the New York Yankees in the 1st round (21st pick) of the 2006 amateur draft. Player signed August 17, 2006.
- June 6, 2006: Joba Chamberlain was drafted by the New York Yankees in the 1st round (41st pick) of the 2006 amateur draft. Player signed September 2, 2006.

=== Roster ===
2006 New York Yankees
Roster
Pitchers: 38 T. J. Beam; 58 Colter Bean; 33 Brian Bruney; 39 Shawn Chacón; 29 Octavio Dotel; 46 Scott Erickson; 48 Kyle Farnsworth; 62 Sean Henn; 41 Randy Johnson; 58 Jeff Karstens; 30 Cory Lidle; 35 Mike Mussina; 36 Mike Myers; 24 Sidney Ponson; 43 Scott Proctor; 61 Darrell Rasner; 42 Mariano Rivera; 31 Aaron Small; 30 Matt Smith; 56 Tanyon Sturtze; 31 José Veras; 47 Ron Villone; 40 Chien-Ming Wang; 38 Kris Wilson; 34 Jaret Wright	Catchers: 26 Sal Fasano; 60 Wil Nieves; 20 Jorge Posada; 33 Kelly Stinnett; Infielders: 14 Miguel Cairo; 63 Andy Cannizaro; 22 Robinson Canó; 25 Jason Giambi; 17 Nick Green; 2 Derek Jeter; 12 Andy Phillips; 13 Alex Rodriguez; 39 Craig Wilson	Outfielders: 53 Bobby Abreu; 28 Melky Cabrera; 19 Bubba Crosby; 18 Johnny Damon; 46 Aaron Guiel; 26 Terrence Long; 55 Hideki Matsui; 27 Kevin Reese; 11 Gary Sheffield; 27 Kevin Thompson; 51 Bernie Williams	Manager: 6 Joe Torre; Coaches: 53,50 Larry Bowa (third base); 49 Ron Guidry (pitching); 57 Joe Kerrigan (bullpen); 23 Don Mattingly (hitting); 54 Lee Mazzilli (bench); 52 Tony Peña (first base)

=== Game log ===
2006 game log
April

#	Date	Opponent	Score	Win	Loss	Save	Attendance	Record
1	April 3	Yankees	15–2	Oakland	Johnson (1–0)		35,077	1–0
2	April 4	Yankees	3–4	Oakland	Proctor (0–1)		31,284	1–1
3	April 5	Yankees	4–9	Oakland	Wright (0–1)		30,165	1–2
4	April 7	Yankees	1–4	Angels	Chacón (0–1)		44,221	1–3
5	April 8	Yankees	2–3	Angels	Johnson (1–1)		44,044	1–4
6	April 9	Yankees	10–1	Angels	Mussina (1–0)		44,020	2–4
7	April 11	Kansas City	7–9	Yankees	Proctor (1–1)	Rivera (1)	54,698	3–4
8	April 12	Kansas City	5–12	Yankees	Chacón (1–1)		41,448	4–4
9	April 13	Kansas City	3–9	Yankees	Johnson (2–1)		54,381	5–4
10	April 14	Yankees	1–5	Minnesota	Mussina (1–1)		30,622	5–5
11	April 15	Yankees	5–6	Minnesota	Rivera (0–1)		42,316	5–6
12	April 16	Yankees	9–3	Minnesota	Wang (1–0)		22,627	6–6
13	April 18	Yankees	5–10	Toronto	Johnson (2–2)		48,776	6–7
14	April 19	Yankees	3–1	Toronto	Mussina (2–1)	Rivera (2)	32,886	7–7
15	April 21	Baltimore	6–5	Yankees	Wang (1–1)		51,282	7–8
16	April 22	Baltimore	1–6	Yankees	Chacón (2–1)		50,872	8–8
17	April 23	Baltimore	1–7	Yankees	Johnson (3–2)		47,996	9–8
18	April 25	Tampa Bay	1–9	Yankees	Mussina (3–1)		36,334	10–8
19	April 26	Tampa Bay	4–2	Yankees	Rivera (0–2)		35,642	10–9
20	April 27	Tampa Bay	1–4	Yankees	Chacón (2–1)	Rivera (3)	45,826	11–9
21	April 28	Toronto	7–2	Yankees	Wright (0–2)		47,204	11–10
22	April 29	Toronto	6–17	Yankees	Johnson (4–2)		50,119	12–10
23	April 30	Toronto	1–4	Yankees	Mussina (4–1)	Rivera (4)	52,954	13–10

May

#	Date	Opponent	Score	Win	Loss	Save	Attendance	Record
24	May 1	Yankees	7–3	Boston	Small (0–1)		36,339	13–11
–	May 2	Yankees		Boston	Postponed			13–11
25	May 3	Yankees	4–2	Tampa Bay	Farnsworth (1–0)	Rivera (5)	17,059	14–11
26	May 4	Yankees	10–5	Tampa Bay	Johnson (5–2)		22,164	15–11
27	May 5	Yankees	8–7	Texas	Mussina (5–1)	Rivera (6)	39,002	16–11
28	May 6	Yankees	6–1	Texas	Chacón (4–1)		48,634	17–11
29	May 7	Yankees	8–5	Texas	Wang (2–1)		46,013	18–11
30	May 9	Boston	14–3	Yankees	Johnson (5–3)		54,688	18–12
31	May 10	Boston	3–7	Yankees	Mussina (6–1)		54,769	19–12
32	May 11	Boston	5–3	Yankees	Villone (0–1)		54,956	19–13
33	May 12	Oakland	0–2	Yankees	Wang (3–1)	Rivera (7)	47,797	20–13
34	May 13	Oakland	3–4	Yankees	Wright (1–2)	Farnsworth (1)	53,907	21–13
35	May 14	Oakland	6–1	Yankees	Johnson (5–4)		52,587	21–14
36	May 15	Texas	4–3	Yankees	Farnsworth (1–1)		41,115	21–15
37	May 16	Texas	13–14	Yankees	Rivera (1–2)		40,757	22–15
38	May 17	Texas	3–4	Yankees	Wang (4–1)	Rivera (8)	52,547	23–15
39	May 18	Texas	6–2	Yankees	Wright (1–3)		47,194	23–16
40	May 19	Yankees	6–7	Mets	Rivera (1–3)		56,289	23–17
41	May 20	Yankees	5–4	Mets	Rivera (2–3)		56,185	24–17
42	May 21	Yankees	3–4	Mets	Small (0–2)		56,205	24–18
43	May 22	Yankees	5–9	Boston	Wang (4–2)		36,342	24–19
44	May 23	Yankees	7–5	Boston	Wright (2–3)	Rivera (9)	36,290	25–19
45	May 24	Yankees	8–6	Boston	Johnson (6–4)	Rivera (10)	36,375	26–19
46	May 26	Kansas City	7–6	Yankees	Farnsworth (1–2)		48,035	26–20
47	May 27	Kansas City	4–15	Yankees	Wang (5–2)		54,216	27–20
48	May 28	Kansas City	5–6	Yankees	Wright (3–3)	Rivera (11)	54,372	28–20
49	May 29	Yankees	4–0	Detroit	Johnson (7–4)		39,759	29–20
50	May 30	Yankees	11–6	Detroit	Rivera (3–3)		24,765	30–20
51	May 31	Yankees	6–1	Detroit	Mussina (7–1)		23,737	31–20

June

#	Date	Opponent	Score	Win	Loss	Save	Attendance	Record
52	June 1	Yankees	6–7	Detroit	Farnsworth (1–3)		27,231	31–21
53	June 2	Yankees	6–5	Baltimore	Farnsworth (2–3)		48,168	32–21
54	June 3	Yankees	6–5	Baltimore	Proctor (2–1)	Wang (1)	48,195	33–21
55	June 4	Yankees	4–11	Baltimore	Small (0–3)		47,535	33–22
56	June 5	Boston	5–13	Yankees	Mussina (8–1)		55,246	34–22
57	June 6	Boston	1–2	Yankees	Wang (6–2)	Rivera (12)	55,141	35–22
–	June 7	Boston		Yankees	Postponed			35–22
58	June 8	Boston	9–3	Yankees	Wright (3–4)		55,225	35–23
59	June 9	Oakland	6–5	Yankees	Johnson (7–5)		53,837	35–24
60	June 10	Oakland	5–2	Yankees	Mussina (8–2)		53,779	35–25
61	June 11	Oakland	6–5	Yankees	Farnsworth (2–4)		54,570	35–26
62	June 13	Cleveland	0–1	Yankees	Wang (7–2)	Rivera (13)	50,365	36–26
63	June 14	Cleveland	1–6	Yankees	Johnson (7–5)		53,448	37–26
64	June 15	Cleveland	8–4	Yankees	Mussina (8–3)		54,648	37–27
65	June 16	Yankees	7–5	Washington	Rivera (4–3)		44,749	38–27
66	June 17	Yankees	9–11	Washington	Rivera (4–4)		45,085	38–28
67	June 18	Yankees	2–3	Washington	Wang (7–3)		45,157	38–29
68	June 19	Yankees	2–4	Philadelphia	Johnson (8–6)		44,747	38–30
69	June 20	Yankees	9–7	Philadelphia	Beam (1–0)	Rivera (14)	44,775	39–30
70	June 21	Yankees	5–0	Philadelphia	Wright (4–4)		45,111	40–30
71	June 23	Florida	5–6	Yankees	Wang (8–3)	Rivera (15)	54,025	41–30
–	June 24	Florida		Yankees	Postponed			41–30
72	June 25	Florida	1–2	Yankees	Mussina (9–3)	Rivera (16)	53,615	42–30
73	June 25	Florida	1–2	Yankees	Chacón (4–2)		6,809	42–31
74	June 26	Atlanta	2–5	Yankees	Johnson (9–6)	Rivera (17)	54,226	43–31
75	June 27	Atlanta	5–2	Yankees	Wright (4–5)		53,763	43–32
76	June 28	Atlanta	3–4	Yankees	Villone (1–1)		54,186	44–32
77	June 30	Mets	0–2	Yankees	Villone (2–1)	Rivera (18)	55,245	45–32

July

#	Date	Opponent	Score	Win	Loss	Save	Attendance	Record
78	July 1	Mets	8–3	Yankees	Johnson (9–7)		55,132	45–33
79	July 2	Mets	7–16	Yankees	Villone (3–1)		55,212	46–33
80	July 3	Yankees	2–5	Cleveland	Wang (8–4)		42,706	46–34
81	July 4	Yankees	1–19	Cleveland	Chacón (4–3)		29,638	46–35
82	July 5	Yankees	11–3	Cleveland	Mussina (10–3)		31,265	47–35
83	July 6	Yankees	10–4	Cleveland	Johnson (10–7)		34,982	48–35
84	July 7	Yankees	1–0	Tampa Bay	Wright (5–5)	Rivera (19)	25,584	49–35
85	July 8	Yankees	5–1	Tampa Bay	Wang (9–4)		34,982	50–35
86	July 9	Yankees	5–6	Tampa Bay	Proctor (2–2)		31,583	50–36
87	July 14	White Sox	5–6	Yankees	Farnsworth (3–4)	Rivera (20)	55,069	51–36
88	July 15	White Sox	3–14	Yankees	Mussina (11–3)		55,019	52–36
89	July 16	White Sox	4–6	Yankees	Wright (6–5)	Rivera (21)	53,781	53–36
90	July 17	Seattle	2–4	Yankees	Wang (10–4)	Rivera (22)	53,444	54–36
91	July 18	Seattle	4–5	Yankees	Proctor (3–2)		52,992	55–36
92	July 19	Seattle	3–2	Yankees	Johnson (10–8)		54,121	55–37
93	July 20	Yankees	4–5	Toronto	Rivera (4–5)		42,336	55–38
94	July 21	Yankees	3–7	Toronto	Wright (6–6)		40,149	55–39
95	July 22	Yankees	5–4	Toronto	Wang (11–4)	Rivera (23)	50,014	56–39
96	July 23	Yankees	5–13	Toronto	Ponson (0–1)		42,337	56–40
97	July 24	Yankees	6–2	Texas	Johnson (11–8)		43,206	57–40
98	July 25	Yankees	7–4	Texas	Mussina (12–3)	Rivera (24)	42,171	58–40
99	July 26	Yankees	8–7	Texas	Chacón (4–3)	Rivera (25)	43,527	59–40
100	July 28	Tampa Bay	0–6	Yankees	Wang (12–4)		53,979	60–40
101	July 29	Tampa Bay	19–6	Yankees	Johnson (11–9)		54,485	60–41
102	July 30	Tampa Bay	2–4	Yankees	Mussina (13–3)	Rivera (26)	54,102	61–41

August

#	Date	Opponent	Score	Win	Loss	Save	Attendance	Record
103	August 1	Toronto	1–5	Yankees	Wright (7–6)		52,237	62–41
104	August 2	Toronto	2–7	Yankees	Wang (13–4)		54,414	63–41
105	August 3	Toronto	1–8	Yankees	Lidle (1–0)		52,156	64–41
106	August 4	Yankees	5–4	Baltimore	Proctor (4–2)	Rivera (27)	44,840	65–41
107	August 5	Yankees	0–5	Baltimore	Mussina (13–4)		49,159	65–42
108	August 6	Yankees	6–1	Baltimore	Wright (8–6)	Rivera (28)	45,563	66–42
109	August 8	Yankees	5–6	White Sox	Proctor (4–3)		39,872	66–43
110	August 9	Yankees	7–6	White Sox	Johnson (12–9)	Rivera (29)	39,406	66–44
111	August 10	Yankees	4–5	White Sox	Mussina (13–5)		39,289	67–44
112	August 11	Angels	7–4	Yankees	Lidle (1–1)		54,450	67–45
113	August 12	Angels	2–5	Yankees	Wright (9–6)	Rivera (30)	54,157	68–45
114	August 13	Angels	5–3	Yankees	Wang (13–5)		54,309	68–46
115	August 14	Angels	2–7	Yankees	Johnson (13–9)		52,100	69–46
116	August 15	Baltimore	3–6	Yankees	Mussina (11–3)	Rivera (31)	52,418	70–46
117	August 16	Baltimore	3–2	Yankees	Proctor (5–3)		54,244	70–47
118	August 17	Baltimore	12–2	Yankees	Lidle (1–2)		54,333	70–48
119	August 18	Yankees	12–4	Boston	Wang (14–5)		36,325	71–48
120	August 18	Yankees	14–11	Boston	Myers (1–0)		36,071	72–48
121	August 19	Yankees	13–5	Boston	Johnson (14–9)		35,738	73–48
122	August 20	Yankees	8–5	Boston	Rivera (5–5)		36,155	74–48
123	August 21	Yankees	2–1	Boston	Lidle (2–2)	Farnsworth (2)	35,829	75–48
124	August 22	Yankees	5–6	Seattle	Villone (3–2)		42,454	75–49
125	August 23	Yankees	9–2	Seattle	Wang (15–5)		41,380	76–49
126	August 24	Yankees	2–4	Seattle	Johnson (14–10)		44,634	76–50
127	August 25	Yankees	5–6	Angels	Myers (1–1)		44,253	77–51
128	August 26	Yankees	7–12	Angels	Bruney (0–1)		44,185	78–52
129	August 27	Yankees	11–8	Angels	Karstens (1–0)		44,225	79–52
–	August 29	Yankees		Detroit	Postponed			79–52
130	August 30	Yankees	2–0	Detroit	Wang (16–5)	Rivera (32)	52,585	80–52
131	August 30	Yankees	3–5	Detroit	Proctor (5–4)		54,509	80–53
132	August 31	Yankees	6–4	Detroit	Johnson (15–10)	Rivera (33)	54,771	81–53

September

#	Date	Opponent	Score	Win	Loss	Save	Attendance	Record
133	September 1	Minnesota	1–8	Yankees	Lidle (3–2)		54,311	80–53
134	September 2	Minnesota	6–1	Yankees	Karstens (1–1)		53,220	80–54
135	September 3	Minnesota	1–10	Yankees	Rasner (1–0)		55,155	81–54
136	September 4	Yankees	12–5	Kansas City	Beam (2–0)		27,123	82–54
137	September 5	Yankees	0–5	Kansas City	Mussina (13–6)		25,104	82–55
138	September 6	Yankees	8–3	Kansas City	Johnson (16–10)		16,421	83–55
139	September 8	Yankees	4–9	Baltimore	Lidle (3–3)		36,214	83–56
140	September 9	Yankees	3–2	Baltimore	Wang (17–5)	Farnsworth (3)	45,827	84–56
141	September 10	Yankees	9–4	Baltimore	Wright (10–7)		40,125	85–56
142	September 11	Yankees	9–6	Baltimore	Johnson (17–10)	Farnsworth (4)	21,742	86–56
143	September 12	Tampa Bay	4–12	Yankees	Mussina (14–6)		54,570	87–56
144	September 13	Tampa Bay	4–8	Yankees	Bruney (1–1)		52,265	88–56
145	September 14	Tampa Bay	4–7	Yankees	Rasner (2–0)		51,965	89–56
–	September 15	Boston		Yankees	Postponed			89–56
146	September 16	Boston	5–2	Yankees	Wang (17–6)		55,091	89–57
147	September 16	Boston	5–7	Yankees	Proctor (6–4)	Farnsworth (5)	55,167	90–57
148	September 17	Boston	6–3	Yankees	Villone (3–3)		55,002	90–58
149	September 17	Boston	5–4	Yankees	Farnsworth (3–5)		55,221	90–59
150	September 18	Yankees	7–6	Toronto	Rasner (3–0)	Veras (1)	32,286	91–59
151	September 19	Yankees	6–3	Toronto	Karstens (2–1)	Farnsworth (6)	30,793	92–59
152	September 20	Yankees	2–3	Toronto	Henn (0–1)		33,029	92–60
153	September 22	Yankees	4–1	Tampa Bay	Wang (18–6)	Rivera (34)	26,337	93–60
154	September 23	Yankees	0–8	Tampa Bay	Johnson (17–11)		33,492	93–61
155	September 24	Yankees	4–11	Tampa Bay	Mussina (14–7)		31,422	93–62
156	September 25	Yankees	16–1	Tampa Bay	Wright (11–7)		24,053	94–62
157	September 26	Baltimore	4–5	Yankees	Lidle (4–3)	Proctor (1)	53,420	95–62
158	September 27	Baltimore	5–16	Yankees	Wang (19–6)		53,040	96–62
159	September 28	Baltimore	7–1	Yankees	Rasner (3–1)		54,046	96–63
160	September 29	Toronto	2–7	Yankees	Mussina (15–7)		52,331	97–63
161	September 30	Toronto	6–5	Yankees	Myers (1–2)		54,576	97–64

October

#	Date	Opponent	Score	Win	Loss	Save	Attendance	Record
162	October 1	Toronto	5–7	Yankees	Farnsworth (3–6)		54,886	97–65

=== Player stats ===
==== Batting ====
Note: G = Games played; AB = At bats; H = Hits; Avg. = Batting average; HR = Home runs; RBI = Runs batted in

Player	G	AB	H	Avg.	HR	RBI
Derek Jeter	154	653	214	.343	14	97
Johnny Damon	149	593	169	.285	24	80
Alex Rodriguez	154	572	166	.290	35	121
Robinson Canó	122	482	165	.342	15	78
Jorge Posada	143	465	129	.277	23	93
Melky Cabrera	130	460	129	.280	7	50
Jason Giambi	139	446	113	.253	37	113
Bernie Williams	131	420	118	.281	12	61
Andy Phillips	110	246	59	.240	7	29
Miguel Cairo	81	222	53	.239	0	30
Bobby Abreu	58	209	69	.330	7	42
Hideki Matsui	51	172	52	.302	8	29
Gary Sheffield	39	151	45	.298	6	25
Craig Wilson	40	104	22	.212	4	8
Bubba Crosby	65	87	18	.207	1	6
Aaron Guiel	44	82	21	.256	4	11
Kelly Stinnett	34	79	18	.228	1	9
Nick Green	46	75	18	.240	2	4
Sal Fasano	28	49	7	.143	1	5
Terrence Long	12	36	6	.167	0	2
Kevin Thompson	19	30	9	.300	1	6
Kevin Reese	10	12	5	.417	0	1
Andy Cannizaro	13	8	2	.250	1	1
Wil Nieves	6	6	0	.000	0	0
Pitcher totals	162	22	1	.045	0	1
Team totals	162	5651	1608	.285	210	902

Note: Individual pitchers batting not included

==== Pitching ====
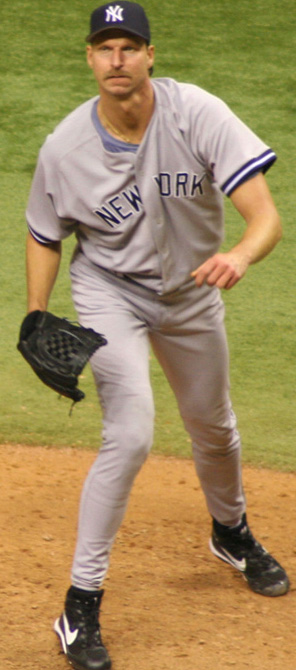
Randy Johnson pitching in 2006.

===== Starting and other pitchers =====
Note: G = Games pitched; W = Wins; L = Losses; ERA = Earned run average; SO = Strikeouts

Player	G	W	L	ERA	SO
Chien-Ming Wang (1 SV)	34	19	6	3.63	76
Randy Johnson	33	17	11	5.00	172
Mike Mussina	32	15	7	3.51	172
Jaret Wright	30	11	7	4.49	84
Shawn Chacón	17	5	3	7.00	35
Aaron Small	11	0	3	8.46	12
Cory Lidle	10	4	3	5.16	32
Jeff Karstens	8	2	1	3.80	16
Darrell Rasner	6	3	1	4.43	11
Sidney Ponson	5	0	1	10.47	15
Kris Wilson	5	0	0	8.64	6
Sean Henn	4	0	1	4.82	7

===== Relief pitchers =====
Note: G = Games pitched; W = Wins; L = Losses; SV = Saves; ERA = Earned run average; SO = Strikeouts

Player	G	W	L	SV	ERA	SO
Mariano Rivera	63	5	5	34	1.80	55
Scott Proctor	83	6	4	1	3.52	89
Kyle Farnsworth	72	3	6	6	4.36	75
Ron Villone	70	3	3	0	5.04	72
Mike Myers	62	1	2	0	3.23	22
T.J. Beam	20	2	0	0	8.56	12
Brian Bruney	19	1	1	0	0.87	25
Tanyon Sturtze	18	0	0	0	7.59	6
Octavio Dotel	14	0	0	0	10.80	7
Matt Smith	12	0	0	0	0.00	9
José Veras	12	0	0	1	4.09	6
Scott Erickson	9	0	0	0	7.94	2
Colter Bean	2	0	0	0	9.00	1
Team Pitching Totals	162	97	65	43	4.41	1019

== Playoffs ==
=== American League Division Series ===
The 2006 American League Division Series was played between New York Yankees and Detroit Tigers. New York finished 1st in the American League East, while Detroit captured the wild card. Detroit ended up winning the series 3–1.

#	Date	Visitor	Score	Home	OT	Win/Loss	Save	Attendance	Record
1	October 3	Detroit	4 – 8	New York (AL)		Wang		56,291	1–0
2	October 5	Detroit	4 – 3	New York (AL)		Mussina		56,252	1-1
3	October 6	New York (AL)	0 – 6	Detroit		Johnson		43,440	1–2
4	October 7	New York (AL)	3 – 8	Detroit		Wright		43,126	1–3

== Farm system ==
Level	Team	League	Manager
AAA	Columbus Clippers	International League	Dave Miley
AA	Trenton Thunder	Eastern League	Bill Masse
A	Tampa Yankees	Florida State League	Luis Sojo
A	Charleston RiverDogs	South Atlantic League	Bill Mosiello
A-Short Season	Staten Island Yankees	New York–Penn League	Gaylen Pitts
Rookie	GCL Yankees	Gulf Coast League	Matt Martin
