= Jerry Owens =

American baseball player (born 1981)

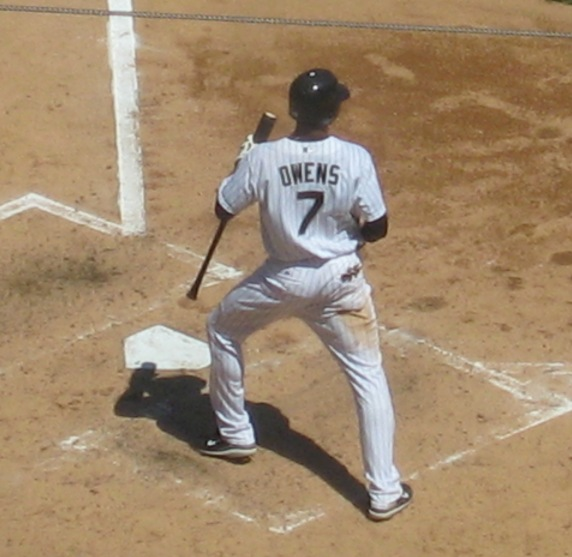
- Owens with the Chicago White Sox
- Outfielder
- Born: February 16, 1981 (age 45); Hollywood, California, U.S.
- Batted: Left Threw: Left

MLB debut
- September 11, 2006, for the Chicago White Sox

Last MLB appearance
- April 29, 2009, for the Chicago White Sox

MLB statistics
- Batting average: .262
- Home runs: 1
- Runs batted in: 18
- Stolen bases: 36
- Stats at Baseball Reference

Teams
- Chicago White Sox (2006–2009)

Jerry Lee Owens (born February 16, 1981) is an American former professional baseball player. He played parts of four seasons in Major League Baseball (MLB) with the Chicago White Sox from 2006 to 2009.

Owens announced his retirement from professional baseball in November 2016 while playing for the Naranjeros de Hermosillo of the Mexican Pacific League.

== Amateur career ==
Owens graduated from Hart High School in California, where he played wide receiver on the championship football team with NFL quarterback Kyle Boller. In high school, Owens was named to numerous All-America teams and was an elite recruit. Owens originally attended the University of California, Los Angeles, but later transferred to The Master's College in California after several injuries and a revelation. At The Master's College, he was named the Small College All-American Outfielder for 2003.

== Professional career ==
=== Montreal Expos minor league system ===
Owens was selected by the Montreal Expos in the second round (57th overall) of the 2003 Major League Baseball draft. Owens first was sent to play Single-A baseball with the Vermont Expos of the New York–Penn League in 2003. However, he only played two games with the team, going 1-for-8 (.125) with a stolen base. In 2004, Owens advanced to the Single-A Savannah Sand Gnats of the South Atlantic League. Owens burst onto the scouting scene by posting some impressive numbers, including a .292 batting average and 30 stolen bases in 108 games.

=== Chicago White Sox ===
On February 13, 2005, Owens was traded to the Chicago White Sox for outfielder Alex Escobar. Owens spent 2005 with the Double-A Birmingham Barons of the Southern League. He had a sensational season, batting .331 with two home runs, 52 RBI and 38 stolen bases in 130 games. Owens was named a Southern League All-Star outfielder and he also led the league in batting average.

In spring training for the White Sox in 2006, Owens had to compete with Brian Anderson for the job of center fielder, but White Sox general manager Kenny Williams stated that Owens would probably not get the job because he had a shoulder injury a few years before. Owens was put on the White Sox' extended 40-man roster, and was optioned back to the International League with the Triple-A Charlotte Knights. He batted .262 with four home runs and 48 RBI in 112 games, and showed development in his base-stealing, stealing 40 bases and being caught only 12 times. Owens was called up and made his major league debut as a pinch runner on September 11, 2006 against the Los Angeles Angels of Anaheim. His first start came on September 27, a game in which he collected both his first hit and stole his first base as a major leaguer.

Owens started the 2008 regular season on the fifteen-day disabled list after an MRI revealed a slight tear in his right adductor muscle.

=== Seattle Mariners ===
Owens was considered for the center field job vacated by Ken Griffey Jr. for the 2009 season, but the White Sox released him on May 2 after he batted .083 in 12 games. He then signed a minor league contract with the Seattle Mariners the next day. Playing for the Mariners' Triple-A affiliate, the Tacoma Rainiers, he went on to lead the Rainiers with a .323 average, and also hit three home runs, recorded 37 RBI and stole 23 bases in 100 games.

=== Washington Nationals ===
On December 8, 2009, the Washington Nationals signed Owens to a minor league contract with an invitation to Spring Training. He did not play during the 2010 season.

=== Lancaster Barnstormers ===
After three years out of baseball, Owens signed with the Lancaster Barnstormers for the 2013 season. He finished the season batting .341 with two home runs and 48 RBI in 117 games.

==== Mexican Baseball League (LMB) ====
Owens first signed with the Piratas de Campeche in May 2013. He appeared in seven games for them during the 2013 season, batting .194 before he was released in early June.

Owens later was assigned to the Tigres de Quintana Roo for both the 2014 and 2016 seasons, appearing in 19 and 23 games, respectively.

==== Mexican Pacific League (LMP) ====
Owens played with the Naranjeros de Hermosillo of the Mexican Pacific League (Winter League) for four seasons, starting in 2013-14. The club won the league championship that year, with Owens playing a key role in the team's success. He won the league batting title, impressing in his first year with a .361 average, 90 hits, 10 doubles, four triples, a home run and 29 RBI in 61 games played.

Owens announced his retirement from professional baseball in the middle of his fourth season with the team on November 14, 2016, citing that he wasn't at the physical level necessary to continue his playing career.
