= Steve Andrade =

American baseball player (born 1978)

- Relief pitcher
- Born: February 6, 1978 (age 48); Woodland, California, U.S.
- Batted: Right Threw: Right

MLB debut
- May 1, 2006, for the Kansas City Royals

Last MLB appearance
- May 10, 2006, for the Kansas City Royals

MLB statistics
- Win–loss record: 0–0
- Earned run average: 9.64
- Strikeouts: 5
- Stats at Baseball Reference

Teams
- Kansas City Royals (2006)

Stephen Michael Andrade (born February 6, 1978) is an American former professional baseball right-handed relief pitcher who last played professionally in 2009. He played in Major League Baseball for the Kansas City Royals during the 2006 season. He is an alumnus of California State University, Stanislaus.

== Career ==
Andrade made his Major League Baseball debut with the Kansas City Royals on May 1, 2006, against the Detroit Tigers at Comerica Park in Detroit, Michigan. He was designated for assignment by the Royals on June 10 a month after being optioned to the Triple-A Omaha Royals. He then joined the San Diego Padres organization, pitching for the Padres' Triple-A affiliate, the Portland Beavers.

On December 1, 2006, Andrade signed a minor league contract with the Tampa Bay Devil Rays. He pitched in the Devil Rays' minor league system again in 2008 and became a free agent after the season. On February 22, 2009, he signed with the York Revolution of the independent Atlantic League of Professional Baseball.
