= Steve Stemle =

American baseball player

- Pitcher
- Born: May 20, 1977 (age 49); Louisville, Kentucky, U.S.
- Batted: Right Threw: Right

MLB debut
- May 26, 2005, for the Kansas City Royals

Last MLB appearance
- April 16, 2006, for the Kansas City Royals

MLB statistics
- Win–loss record: 0–1
- Earned run average: 8.64
- Strikeouts: 9
- Stats at Baseball Reference

Teams
- Kansas City Royals (2005–2006)

Stephen Joseph Stemle (born May 20, 1977) is an American former professional baseball player and was a pitcher for the Kansas City Royals. He pitched in 11 major league games over two seasons, and had a career ERA of 8.64.

Stemle played his high school ball at New Albany High School, and collegiately at Western Kentucky University. In 1996, he played collegiate summer baseball with the Chatham A's of the Cape Cod Baseball League. He was selected by the St. Louis Cardinals in the 5th round of the 1998 MLB draft. He also currently runs LoKator Academy

He is now retired due to disk problems in his back and is a pitching coach for Kentucky Country Day School.

== See also ==
- List of people from the Louisville metropolitan area
