= Agustín Montero =

Dominican baseball player (born 1977)

- Pitcher
- Born: August 26, 1977 (age 48); San Pedro de Macorís, Dominican Republic
- Batted: Right Threw: Right

MLB debut
- May 12, 2006, for the Chicago White Sox

Last MLB appearance
- June 28, 2006, for the Chicago White Sox

MLB statistics
- Win–loss record: 1–0
- Earned run average: 5.14
- Strikeouts: 7
- Stats at Baseball Reference

Teams
- Chicago White Sox (2006)

Agustín Alcantara Montero (born August 26, 1977) is a Dominican former professional baseball pitcher. He played in Major League Baseball (MLB) for the Chicago White Sox.

== Career ==
On April 20, 2005, Montero became the third player to test positive under Major League Baseball's new steroid policy, and was suspended for 10 days without pay. Although he had not played in the Major Leagues at that time, he was on the Rangers' 40-man roster during spring training, and was subject to random testing.

He signed a minor league contract with the Oakland Athletics on June 9, 2007. He was later released and signed with the Northwest Independent League on May 27, 2008.

== See also ==
- List of sportspeople sanctioned for doping offences
