= Kevin Thompson (baseball) =

American baseball player (born 1979)

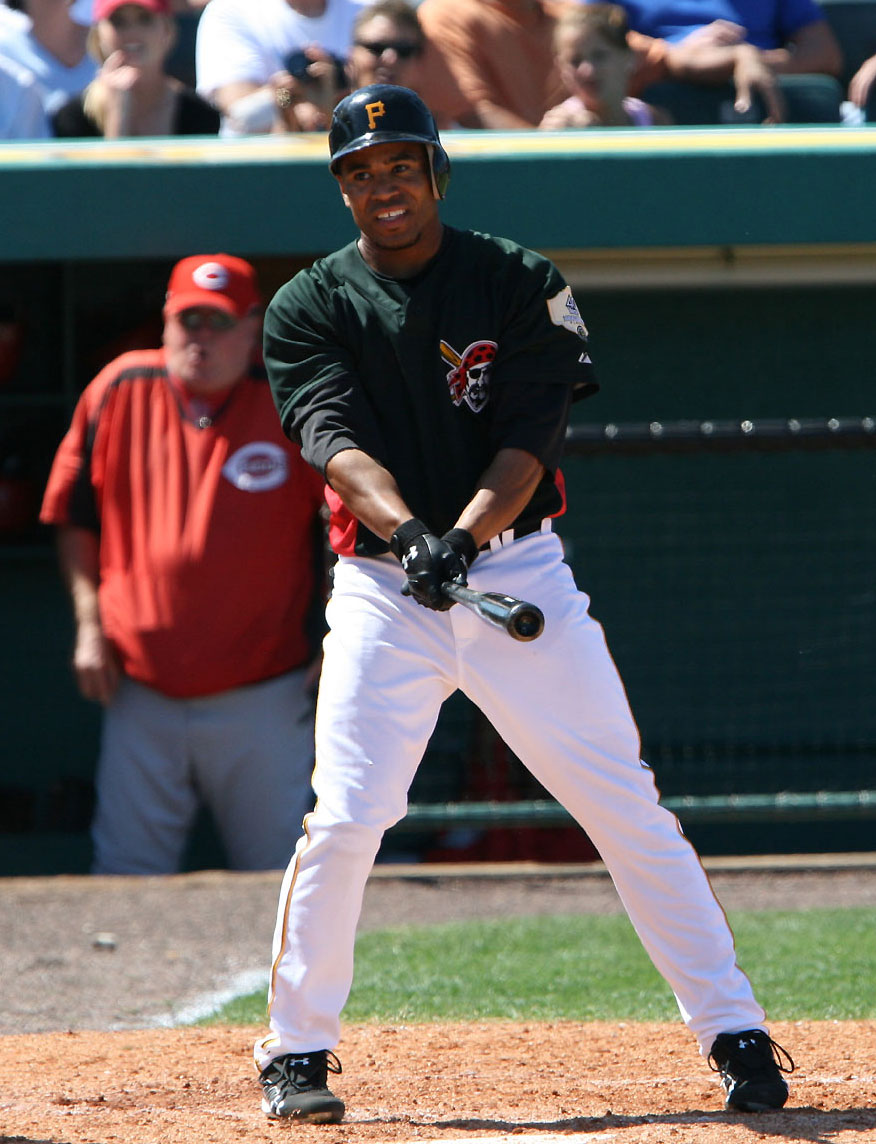
- Outfielder
- Born: September 18, 1979 (age 46); Fort Worth, Texas, U.S.
- Batted: Right Threw: Right

MLB debut
- June 3, 2006, for the New York Yankees

Last MLB appearance
- September 30, 2007, for the Oakland Athletics

MLB statistics
- Batting average: .215
- Home runs: 1
- Runs batted in: 9
- Stats at Baseball Reference

Teams
- New York Yankees (2006–2007); Oakland Athletics (2007)

Kevin Deshawn Thompson (born September 18, 1979) is a former professional baseball outfielder.

== Early life ==
Thompson played Little League with the Benbrook youth league and graduated with honors from Western Hills High School, where he played baseball and football. Thompson graduated from the University of Texas at Arlington with his Bachelor of Business Administration degree in Finance as of May 2011.

== Career ==
He was selected in the 18th round (529th overall) of the 1998 amateur entry draft by the Minnesota Twins.

He was a South Atlantic League All-Star selection in 2002 and a Florida State League All-Star in 2003. Injuries plagued his 2004 season, however, he went to the Arizona Fall League and excelled. Hitting .320 with 5 home runs, he was nominated to Arizona Fall League All-Prospects team in 2004.

He won the Yankees' minor league player of the year award for the 2005 season, when he played with the Yankees' Double-A affiliate, the Trenton Thunder and the Triple-A affiliate, the Columbus Clippers. He made his major league debut on June 3, 2006, as a member of the Yankees, getting his first major league hit in the game.

=== 2007 ===
On April 8, 2007, he was called up because of Hideki Matsui's injury. He had a two-RBI double in his first at bat of the season against the Twins off of Dennys Reyes. On September 1, the Yankees designated Thompson for assignment, and he was claimed off waivers by the Oakland Athletics on September 7. He was later claimed off waivers by the Pittsburgh Pirates on October 15.

=== 2008 ===
Thompson started 2008 with the Pirates' Triple-A affiliate, the Indianapolis Indians, but was released due to hand surgery on June 25.

=== 2009 ===
Thompson has signed with the Newark Bears of the independent Atlantic League of Professional Baseball. On September 4, 2009, Thompson Signed A minor league contract with the Texas Rangers.

=== 2010 ===
Thompson played for the Fort Worth Cats of the American Association. He was released by them on February 10, 2011.

=== 2011 ===
Thompson joined the Grand Prairie AirHogs of the American Association of Independent Professional Baseball for the 2011 season.
