= Mike Wood (baseball) =

American baseball player (born 1980)

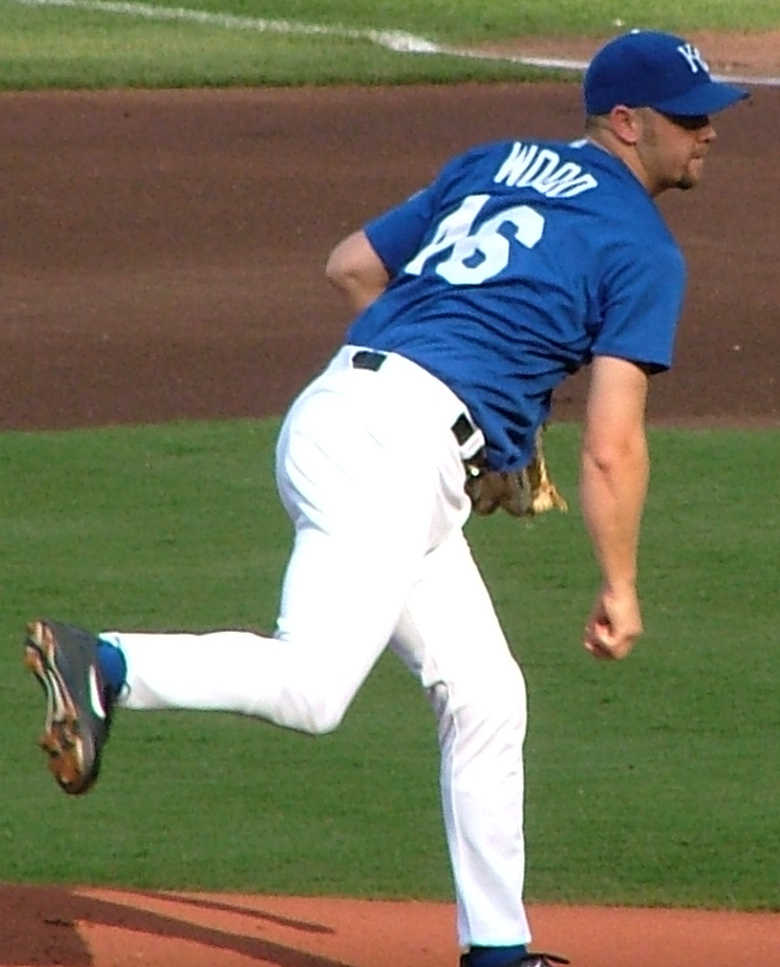
- Wood with the Kansas City Royals in 2004
- Pitcher
- Born: April 26, 1980 (age 46); West Palm Beach, Florida, U.S.
- Batted: Right Threw: Right

Professional debut
- MLB: August 21, 2003, for the Oakland Athletics
- NPB: March 29, 2008, for the Yokohama BayStars

Last appearance
- MLB: September 28, 2007, for the Texas Rangers
- NPB: September 27, 2008, for the Yokohama BayStars

MLB statistics
- Win–loss record: 16–22
- Earned run average: 5.49
- Strikeouts: 183

NPB statistics
- Win–loss record: 3–12
- Earned run average: 4.69
- Strikeouts: 57
- Stats at Baseball Reference

Teams
- Oakland Athletics (2003); Kansas City Royals (2004–2006); Texas Rangers (2007); Yokohama BayStars (2008)

Michael Burton Wood (born April 26, 1980) is an American former professional baseball pitcher. He played all or parts of five seasons in Major League Baseball (MLB), and one in Nippon Professional Baseball (NPB), from 2003 to 2008.

== Career ==
Wood graduated from Forest Hill Community High School in West Palm Beach, Florida, in 1997 and then went on to attend the University of North Florida. He was drafted by the Oakland Athletics in the tenth round (311th overall) of the 2001 Major League Baseball draft.

Wood made his major league debut on August 21, 2003, with the Athletics. The Kansas City Royals acquired Wood on June 24, 2004, from the Athletics as part of the three-team trade that sent Carlos Beltrán to the Houston Astros. Kansas City immediately promoted him from Triple-A and put him in their starting rotation, where he compiled a 3–8 record with a 5.94 ERA in 17 starts.

Wood spent the early part of the 2005 season in the bullpen, but was used as an emergency starter when Brian Anderson went on the 15-day disabled list.

On October 11, 2006, Wood was claimed off waivers by the Texas Rangers, but was not tendered a contract for the 2007 season, making him a free agent. He was then signed to a minor league contract (with an invitation to spring training) with the Rangers later in the off-season, and made the 2007 opening day roster.

In 2008, Wood played for the Yokohama BayStars of the NPB where he pitched to a 4.69 ERA. In January 2009, he signed a minor league contract with the Florida Marlins. In May 2009, the Marlins released Wood. On September 1, Wood signed a minor league contract with the Texas Rangers. He was granted free agency on November 9. He played for the Rockford RiverHawks in the Northern League in 2019.
