= Elmer Dessens =

Mexican baseball player (born 1971)

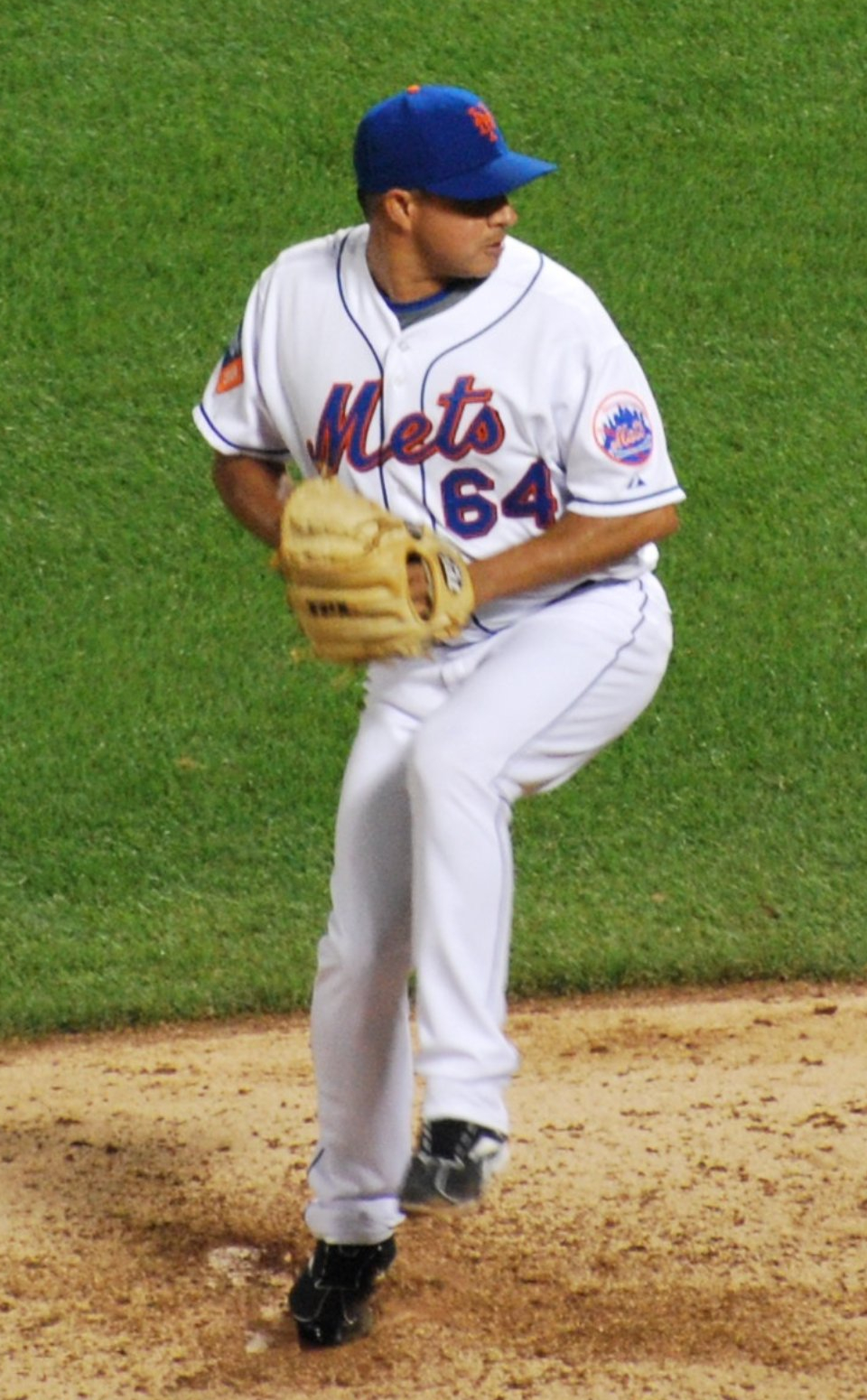
- Dessens with the New York Mets in 2009
- Pitcher
- Born: January 13, 1971 (age 55); Hermosillo, Mexico
- Batted: Right Threw: Right

Professional debut
- MLB: June 24, 1996, for the Pittsburgh Pirates
- NPB: 1999, for the Yomiuri Giants

Last appearance
- MLB: October 2, 2010, for the New York Mets
- NPB: 1999, for the Yomiuri Giants

MLB statistics
- Win–loss record: 52–64
- Earned run average: 4.44
- Strikeouts: 693

NPB statistics
- Win–loss record: 0–1
- Earned run average: 3.86
- Strikeouts: 6
- Stats at Baseball Reference

Teams
- Pittsburgh Pirates (1996–1998); Yomiuri Giants (1999); Cincinnati Reds (2000–2002); Arizona Diamondbacks (2003–2004); Los Angeles Dodgers (2004–2005); Kansas City Royals (2006); Los Angeles Dodgers (2006); Milwaukee Brewers (2007); Colorado Rockies (2007); Atlanta Braves (2008); New York Mets (2009–2010)

Career highlights and awards
- Mexican League Rookie of the Year Award (1994)

Elmer Dessens Jusaino [deh-SENZ] (born January 13, 1971) is a Mexican former professional baseball pitcher. He played in Major League Baseball (MLB) for the Pittsburgh Pirates, Cincinnati Reds, Arizona Diamondbacks, Los Angeles Dodgers, Milwaukee Brewers, Colorado Rockies, Atlanta Braves, and New York Mets. He also played in Nippon Professional Baseball (NPB) for the Yomiuri Giants.

== Personal life ==
Elmer Dessens was born on January 13, 1971, in Hermosillo, Mexico. At age 10, he worked as a newspaper boy. Dessens graduated from Carrera Technical High School. He is married to Lorenia and has three sons, Elmer Jr., Erick, Edward Dessens enjoys fishing and is a Los Angeles Lakers fan.

== Baseball career ==
=== Pittsburgh Pirates ===
Dessens was signed as an amateur free agent by the Pittsburgh Pirates in 1993. He made his major league debut with the Pirates in 1996 and pitched with them until 1998.

=== Yomiuri Giants ===
The Pirates released him at the end of spring training in 1999. He pitched that season for the Yomiuri Giants of the Nippon Professional Baseball League in Japan.

=== Cincinnati Reds ===
Dessens returned to the major leagues in 2000 with the Cincinnati Reds and pitched for them for three seasons.

=== Arizona Diamondbacks ===
During the 2002–03 offseason, Dessens was involved in a four-team trade that sent him to the Arizona Diamondbacks.

=== Los Angeles Dodgers ===
Dessens stayed with the Diamondbacks until August 2004, when the Los Angeles Dodgers acquired him for a minor leaguer to bolster their bullpen for the stretch run. That October, Dessens pitched in the postseason for the first and, to date, last time, appearing in one game during the Dodgers' Division Series loss to the St. Louis Cardinals.

Dessens pitched one more season for the Dodgers, then became a free agent in the offseason.

=== Kansas City Royals ===
Prior to the 2006 season, Dessens signed with the Kansas City Royals.

=== Second Stint with Dodgers ===
In July, the Dodgers reacquired Dessens from the Royals for pitcher Odalis Pérez and two minor leaguers, again to bolster their bullpen. While the Dodgers did win the wild card that season, Dessens did not appear as the Dodgers were swept in the Division Series to the New York Mets.

=== Milwaukee Brewers ===
In March 2007, Dessens was traded from the Dodgers to the Milwaukee Brewers for reserve outfielder Brady Clark and cash.

=== Colorado Rockies ===
In early August he was released by the Brewers, but a few days later he signed a minor league deal with the Colorado Rockies. He started 5 games for the Rockies, going 1–1 with a 7.58 ERA. He became a free agent at the end of the season.

=== Second Stint with Pirates ===
In January 2008, Dessens signed a minor league contract with the Pittsburgh Pirates, but was released during spring training.

=== Diablos Rojos del Mexico ===
He then spent most of the 2008 season in the Mexican League with the Diablos Rojos del México. In 20 games (19 starts) 105 innings he went 10–2 with a 4.03 ERA with 51 strikeouts.

=== Atlanta Braves ===
After pitching (and winning) the final game of the league championship against the Sultanes de Monterrey, he signed a major league contract with the Atlanta Braves in August. After the season, Dessens again became a free agent.

=== New York Mets ===
In February 2009, Dessens signed a minor league deal with the New York Mets. Dessens made his Mets debut on June 23, 2009, against the St. Louis Cardinals. He was designated for assignment on July 30. He had his contract purchased on August 6, 2009, when Jon Niese was placed on the 60-day disabled list.

In December 2009, Dessens signed a minor league contract with the New York Mets for the 2010 season.

=== San Francisco Giants ===
On February 8, 2011, it was reported that Dessens had signed a minor league deal with the San Francisco Giants that included an invitation to spring training. However, on February 14, it was reported that the deal fell through.

=== Diablos Rojos del México (second stint) ===
On March 17, 2011, Dessens signed with the Diablos Rojos del México of the Mexican League. He became a free agent following the season. In 25 games (3 starts) 45.1 innings he struggled going 4–0 with a 5.16 ERA with 34 strikeouts.

== Post Playing ==
He was named pitching coach of the Inland Empire 66ers for the 2023 season.

In 2026, he was named as the pitching coach of the Rancho Cucamonga Quakes the Single-A affiliate of the Los Angeles Angels.1
