= Shane Costa =

American baseball player (born 1981)

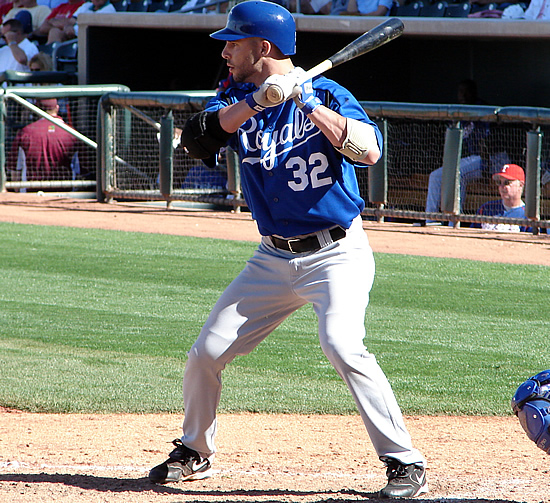
- Outfielder
- Born: December 12, 1981 (age 44); Visalia, California, U.S.
- Batted: Left Threw: Right

MLB debut
- June 2, 2005, for the Kansas City Royals

Last MLB appearance
- September 30, 2007, for the Kansas City Royals

MLB statistics
- Batting average: .254
- Home runs: 5
- Runs batted in: 42
- Stats at Baseball Reference

Teams
- Kansas City Royals (2005–2007)

Shane Jeremy Costa (born December 12, 1981) is an American former professional baseball player.

Costa was born in Visalia, California and measures 6'0" and 220 lbs. From California State University, Fullerton, Costa made his Major League debut on June 2, 2005, against the New York Yankees. He graduated from Golden West High School in 2000.

On December 16, 2009, Costa re-signed with the Kansas City Royals on a minor league contract, however he did not receive an invite to spring training. On March 8, 2011, he signed a contract with the St. Paul Saints. Costa played for the Saints during the 2012 season as well.
