= Luke Hudson =

American baseball player (born 1977)

- Pitcher
- Born: May 2, 1977 (age 49); Fountain Valley, California, U.S.
- Batted: Right Threw: Right

MLB debut
- July 1, 2002, for the Cincinnati Reds

Last MLB appearance
- May 10, 2007, for the Kansas City Royals

MLB statistics
- Win–loss record: 17–18
- Earned run average: 5.11
- Strikeouts: 162
- Stats at Baseball Reference

Teams
- Cincinnati Reds (2002, 2004–2005); Kansas City Royals (2006–2007)

Luke Stephen Hudson (born May 2, 1977) is an American former professional baseball pitcher. He played in Major League Baseball (MLB) for the Cincinnati Reds and the Kansas City Royals.

== Amateur career ==
Hudson was born in Fountain Valley, California and graduated from Fountain Valley High School. He played college baseball at the University of Tennessee. In 1996, he played collegiate summer baseball in the Cape Cod Baseball League for the Yarmouth-Dennis Red Sox and was named a league all-star.

== Professional career ==
Drafted by the Colorado Rockies in the 4th round of the 1998 Major League Baseball draft, Hudson would make his Major League Baseball debut with the Cincinnati Reds on July 1, 2002. He did not pitch in the majors in 2003, but he made it back with the Reds in 2004, when he had a brief but successful stint in which he had a 4-2 record and a 2.42 ERA in nine starts. In 2005, he struggled, going 6-9 with a 6.38 ERA. He was released by the Reds on March 9, 2006 before being acquired by the Kansas City Royals on March 13.

Hudson began the 2006 season pitching for the Kansas City Royals as a reliever. However, he struggled, going 1-3 with a 7.24 ERA while allowing 11 ER over 13 2/3 IP. He was converted to a starter, and he did well initially, going 4-0 with a 3.68 ERA in his first six starts. However, on August 13, in his seventh start with the team, Hudson had easily the worst start of his career, surrendering 11 runs, 10 of them earned, over just 1/3 of an inning against the Cleveland Indians. The Indians scored seven runs before making an out, one shy of the major league record of eight, and they scored the eighth through eleventh runs when Hudson gave up a grand slam to Travis Hafner, Hafner's Major League record-tying sixth grand slam of the season. After the rough outing against Cleveland, Hudson finished the 2006 season by going 2-2 with a 3.86 ERA over his last eight starts.

In 2007, Hudson remained with the Royals, but was hampered by injuries, including two separate trips to the 15-day disabled list. He had only one appearance, giving up five runs in two innings on May 10 in a 17-3 loss to the Oakland A's. He underwent right shoulder surgery in June, ending his season.

Due to a slow recovery from the surgery, Hudson again began the 2008 season on the disabled list, and on April 1, 2009, he announced his retirement.

== Personal ==
Hudson's father, Bill, a very talented water-colorist, owns an art materials company in California; Luke worked as director of marketing in the off seasons while Luke's brother, Will, operated the business. Luke is the fourth of eight children. He and his siblings once played on their own family softball team, named "Taco Truck" in Fountain Valley.
