= Brian Anderson (outfielder) =

American baseball player (born 1982)

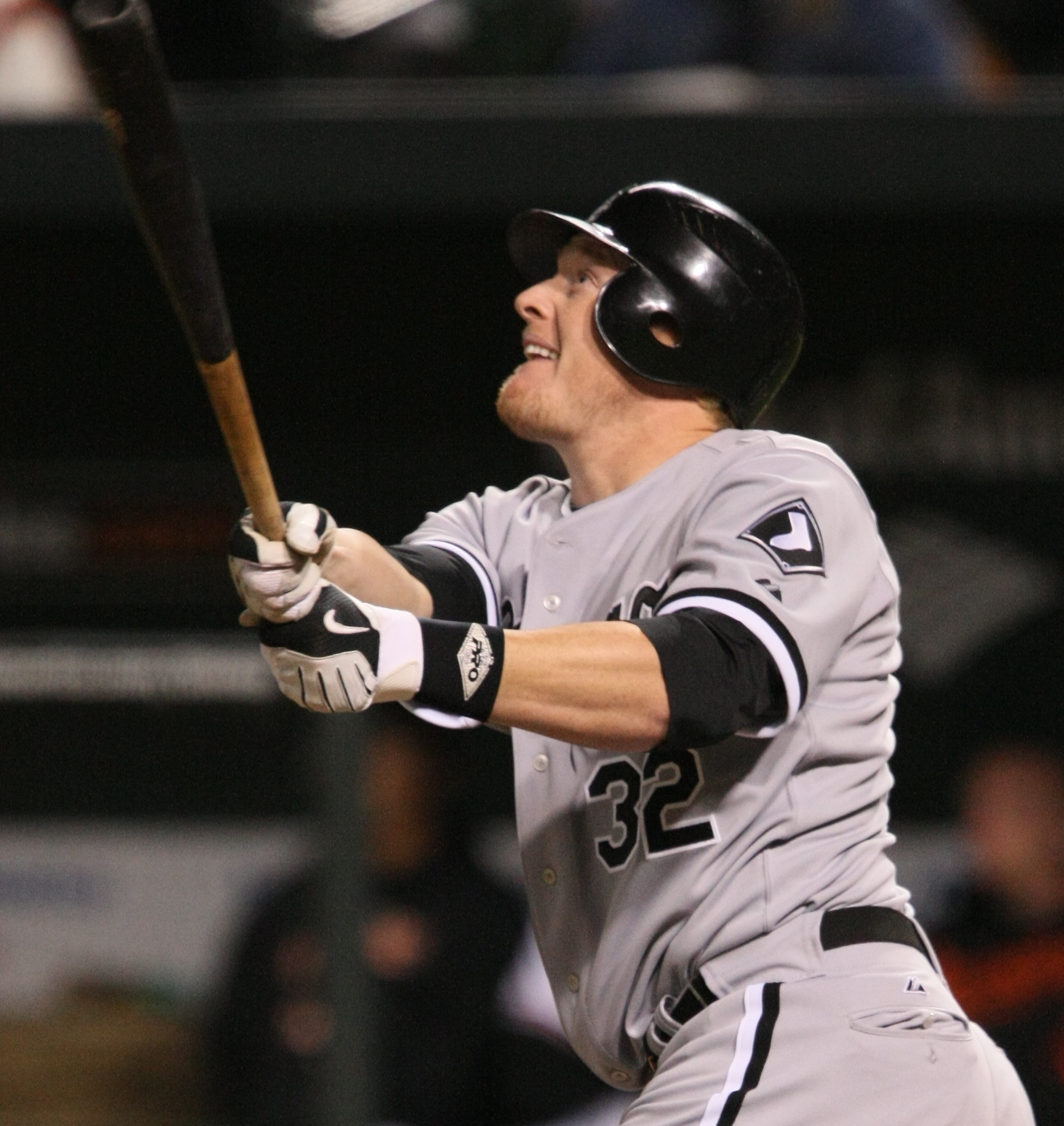
- Anderson with the Chicago White Sox in 2009
- Center fielder
- Born: March 11, 1982 (age 44); Tucson, Arizona, U.S.
- Batted: Right Threw: Right

MLB debut
- August 16, 2005, for the Chicago White Sox

Last MLB appearance
- October 4, 2009, for the Boston Red Sox

MLB statistics
- Batting average: .227
- Home runs: 22
- Runs batted in: 80
- Stats at Baseball Reference

Teams
- Chicago White Sox (2005–2009); Boston Red Sox (2009)

Brian Nikola Anderson (born March 11, 1982) is an American former professional baseball player. He played all or part of five seasons in Major League Baseball with the Chicago White Sox and Boston Red Sox as an outfielder, a position he played professionally until before the 2010 season. He also played for the Kansas City Royals and New York Yankees organizations as a pitcher. He is currently an assistant coach at Northwestern.

== College career ==
Anderson is a graduate of the University of Arizona and Canyon del Oro High School in Oro Valley, Arizona, a suburb of Tucson. All-Star second baseman Ian Kinsler of the Texas Rangers was his best friend and teammate in high school, where they played with Scott Hairston and the brothers Chris and Shelley Duncan.

In 2001, he played collegiate summer baseball in the Cape Cod Baseball League for the Bourne Braves, and returned to the league in 2002 to play with the Cotuit Kettleers. Anderson was named the top pro prospect in Arizona and ranked 27th in the nation by Baseball America. He was named to the Baseball America and USA Today Second-Team All-America team as a junior.

== Playing career ==
=== Chicago White Sox ===
Anderson was drafted by the Chicago White Sox in the first round (15th overall) of the 2003 Major League Baseball draft. He made his major league debut on August 16, 2005 against the Minnesota Twins, finishing the game 2-for-7 in a 16-inning loss. Anderson appeared in 13 games for the White Sox, batting .176 with two home runs and 3 RBI. That offseason, Chicago traded Aaron Rowand to the Philadelphia Phillies in a deal that brought Jim Thome to Chicago, clearing the way for Anderson to become the starting center fielder. In 2006, Anderson showed himself to be a gifted defensive outfielder, though he struggled offensively, finishing with a .225 batting average, eight home runs and 33 RBI in 133 games. He did, however, show signs of improvement in the second half of the season and made some corrections in his swing mechanics. Anderson did not commit an error at the Major League level until August 18, 2006 against the Minnesota Twins, ending his streak of 110 errorless games. On May 20, 2006, Anderson was ejected from an interleague game against the Chicago Cubs for fighting with Cubs first baseman John Mabry. He was fined and served a five-game suspension.

Anderson lost his starting job to Darin Erstad in 2007, and after only 17 at-bats was sent down to the White Sox' AAA affiliate, the Charlotte Knights. At Charlotte, Anderson hit for a .255 average before his season ended with an injury, a disappointment in contrast to his 2005 season in which he hit .294. He eventually earned a spot back on the major-league roster in 2008 as a backup outfielder after a superb spring training changed the organization's negative perceptions of his effort.

Anderson again made the major-league roster in 2009 as a backup outfielder, with DeWayne Wise starting in center field. However, Anderson retrieved the starting job after Wise was injured in April.

=== Boston Red Sox ===
On July 28, 2009, Anderson was traded to the Boston Red Sox for Mark Kotsay and cash considerations. He was non-tendered after the season.

=== Transition to pitching ===
==== Kansas City Royals ====
On December 22, 2009, Anderson signed a one-year, $700,000 contract with the Kansas City Royals. After spring training, Anderson informed the Royals that he wanted to become a pitcher. The Royals allowed Anderson to become a pitcher in the low minors. Anderson began the 2010 season with the Rookie-level Arizona Royals and was later promoted to the Burlington Bees, followed by the Omaha Royals.

==== New York Yankees ====
Anderson signed a minor league contract with an invitation to 2011 spring training with the New York Yankees. He started off the season with the Double-A Trenton Thunder, recording one win, three holds, and a 1.17 earned run average (ERA) in seven appearances. He was placed on the disabled list on May 4, and was later released by the Yankees on May 27.

==== Los Angeles Dodgers ====
On February 26, 2012, Anderson signed a minor league contract with the Los Angeles Dodgers with an invitation to spring training. On March 31, he was released.

==== Colorado Rockies ====
On April 7, 2012, Anderson signed a minor league contract with the Colorado Rockies. He was released eight days later.

=== Somerset Patriots ===
On August 30, 2012, Anderson signed with the Somerset Patriots of the Atlantic League of Professional Baseball. He became a free agent following the season. In 6 games 6 innings of relief he went 0-1 with a 1.50 ERA with 9 strikeouts.

==== Return to Chicago White Sox ====
On January 14, 2015, Anderson attempted a comeback as a position player and signed a minor league contract with the Chicago White Sox. He was released on April 2.

== Coaching career ==
Anderson joined Northwestern as an assistant coach in 2023. He was named the interim head coach in July 2023 after Jim Foster was fired for bullying players. He served in that role for just over a month before being replaced by Ben Greenspan.
