= 2006 Major League Baseball season =

2006 MLB season
- League: Major League Baseball
- Sport: Baseball
- Duration: April 2 – October 27, 2006
- Games: 162
- Teams: 30
- TV partner(s): Fox; ESPN

Draft
- Top draft pick: Luke Hochevar
- Picked by: Kansas City Royals

Regular season
- Season MVP: AL: Justin Morneau (MIN); NL: Ryan Howard (PHI)

Postseason
- AL champions: Detroit Tigers
- AL runners-up: Oakland Athletics
- NL champions: St. Louis Cardinals
- NL runners-up: New York Mets

World Series
- Champions: St. Louis Cardinals
- Runners-up: Detroit Tigers
- World Series MVP: David Eckstein (STL)

MLB seasons
- ← 2005 2007 →

Locations of AL teams for the 2005–2007 MLB seasons
West Central East
Locations of NL teams for the 2006–2007 MLB seasons
West Central East

The 2006 Major League Baseball season ended with the National League's St. Louis Cardinals winning the World Series with the lowest regular-season victory total (83) in a fully-played season in major league history. The Atlanta Braves failed to qualify for the postseason for the first time since 1990 (1994 there was no postseason due to the players strike). Individual achievements included Barry Bonds who, despite questions surrounding his alleged steroid use and involvement in the BALCO scandal, surpassed Babe Ruth for second place on the career home runs list. The American League continued its domination at the All-Star Game by winning its fourth straight game, and ninth of the prior 10 contests (the 2002 game was a tie).

== Standings ==
=== American League ===
AL East
Team	W	L	Pct.	GB	Home	Road
^{(1)} New York Yankees	97	65	.599	—	50‍–‍31	47‍–‍34
Toronto Blue Jays	87	75	.537	10	50‍–‍31	37‍–‍44
Boston Red Sox	86	76	.531	11	48‍–‍33	38‍–‍43
Baltimore Orioles	70	92	.432	27	40‍–‍41	30‍–‍51
Tampa Bay Devil Rays	61	101	.377	36	41‍–‍40	20‍–‍61

AL Central
Team	W	L	Pct.	GB	Home	Road
^{(2)} Minnesota Twins	96	66	.593	—	54‍–‍27	42‍–‍39
^{(4)} Detroit Tigers	95	67	.586	1	46‍–‍35	49‍–‍32
Chicago White Sox	90	72	.556	6	49‍–‍32	41‍–‍40
Cleveland Indians	78	84	.481	18	44‍–‍37	34‍–‍47
Kansas City Royals	62	100	.383	34	34‍–‍47	28‍–‍53

AL West
Team	W	L	Pct.	GB	Home	Road
^{(3)} Oakland Athletics	93	69	.574	—	49‍–‍32	44‍–‍37
Los Angeles Angels	89	73	.549	4	45‍–‍36	44‍–‍37
Texas Rangers	80	82	.494	13	39‍–‍42	41‍–‍40
Seattle Mariners	78	84	.481	15	44‍–‍37	34‍–‍47

=== National League ===
NL East
Team	W	L	Pct.	GB	Home	Road
^{(1)} New York Mets	97	65	.599	—	50‍–‍31	47‍–‍34
Philadelphia Phillies	85	77	.525	12	41‍–‍40	44‍–‍37
Atlanta Braves	79	83	.488	18	40‍–‍41	39‍–‍42
Florida Marlins	78	84	.481	19	42‍–‍39	36‍–‍45
Washington Nationals	71	91	.438	26	41‍–‍40	30‍–‍51

NL Central
Team	W	L	Pct.	GB	Home	Road
^{(3)} St. Louis Cardinals	83	78	.516	—	49‍–‍31	34‍–‍47
Houston Astros	82	80	.506	1½	44‍–‍37	38‍–‍43
Cincinnati Reds	80	82	.494	3½	42‍–‍39	38‍–‍43
Milwaukee Brewers	75	87	.463	8½	48‍–‍33	27‍–‍54
Pittsburgh Pirates	67	95	.414	16½	43‍–‍38	24‍–‍57
Chicago Cubs	66	96	.407	17½	36‍–‍45	30‍–‍51

NL West
Team	W	L	Pct.	GB	Home	Road
^{(2)} San Diego Padres	88	74	.543	—	43‍–‍38	45‍–‍36
^{(4)} Los Angeles Dodgers	88	74	.543	—	49‍–‍32	39‍–‍42
San Francisco Giants	76	85	.472	11½	43‍–‍38	33‍–‍47
Arizona Diamondbacks	76	86	.469	12	39‍–‍42	37‍–‍44
Colorado Rockies	76	86	.469	12	44‍–‍37	32‍–‍49

== Postseason ==
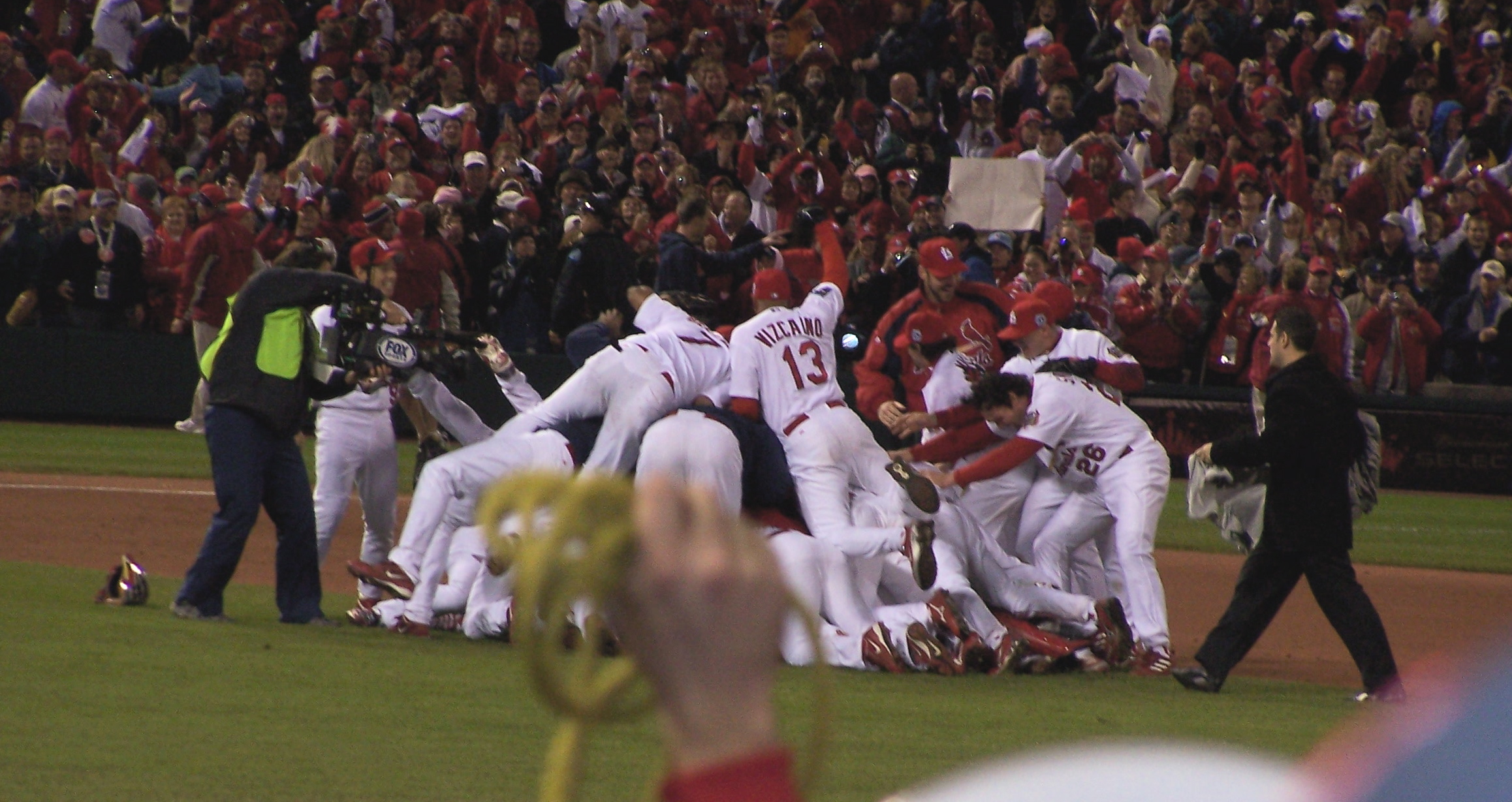
Players of the St. Louis Cardinals celebrate their World Series victory.

=== Bracket ===
Division Series (ALDS, NLDS)
1	NY Yankees	1
4	Detroit	3
American League
2	Minnesota	0
3	Oakland	3
1	NY Mets	3
4	LA Dodgers	0
National League
2	San Diego	1
3	St. Louis	3

League Championship Series (NLCS, ALCS)
4	Detroit	4
3	Oakland	0
1	NY Mets	3
3	St. Louis	4

World Series
AL4	Detroit	1
NL3	St. Louis	4

== All-Star game ==
- All-Star Game, July 11 at PNC Park – American League, 3–2; Michael Young, MVP
  - Century 21 Home Run Derby, July 10 – Ryan Howard, Philadelphia Phillies

== Awards ==
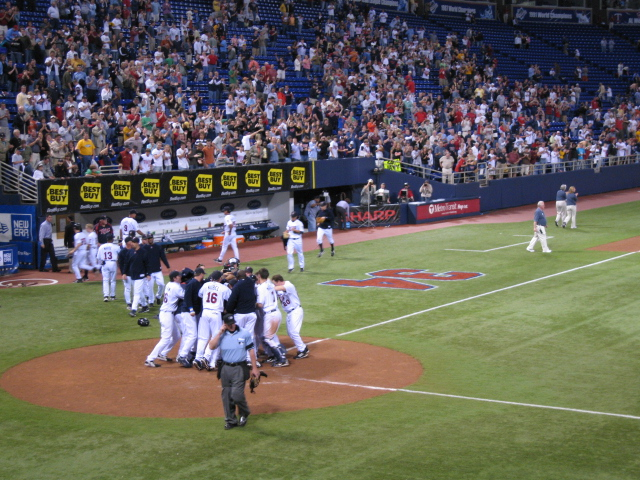
Players of the Minnesota Twins celebrate Justin Morneau's Walk-off home run in victory against the Baltimore Orioles, June 11.

Baseball Writers' Association of America Awards
BBWAA Award	National League	American League
Rookie of the Year	Hanley Ramírez (FLA)	Justin Verlander (DET)
Cy Young Award	Brandon Webb (AZ)	Johan Santana (MIN)
Manager of the Year	Joe Girardi (FLA)	Jim Leyland (DET)
Most Valuable Player	Ryan Howard (PHI)	Justin Morneau (MIN)
Gold Glove Awards
Position	National League	American League
Pitcher	Greg Maddux (CHC/LAD)	Kenny Rogers (DET)
Catcher	Brad Ausmus (HOU)	Iván Rodríguez (DET)
1st Base	Albert Pujols (STL)	Mark Teixeira (TEX)
2nd Base	Orlando Hudson (AZ)	Mark Grudzielanek (KC)
3rd Base	Scott Rolen (STL)	Eric Chavez (OAK)
Shortstop	Omar Vizquel (SF)	Derek Jeter (NYY)
Outfield	Carlos Beltrán (NYM); Mike Cameron (SD); Andruw Jones (ATL)	Torii Hunter (MIN); Ichiro Suzuki (SEA); Vernon Wells (TOR)
Silver Slugger Awards
Position	National League	American League
Pitcher/Designated Hitter	Carlos Zambrano (CHC)	David Ortiz (BOS)
Catcher	Brian McCann (ATL)	Joe Mauer (MIN)
1st Base	Ryan Howard (PHI)	Justin Morneau (MIN)
2nd Base	Chase Utley (PHI)	Robinson Canó (NYY)
3rd Base	Miguel Cabrera (FLA)	Joe Crede (CWS)
Shortstop	José Reyes (NYM)	Derek Jeter (NYY)
Outfield	Carlos Beltrán (NYM); Matt Holliday (COL); Alfonso Soriano (WSH)	Jermaine Dye (CWS); Vladimir Guerrero (LAA); Manny Ramirez (BOS)

=== Other awards ===
- Comeback Players of the Year: Jim Thome (Designated hitter, CWS, American); Nomar Garciaparra (First baseman, LAD, National).
- Edgar Martínez Award (Best designated hitter): David Ortiz (BOS)
- Hank Aaron Award: Derek Jeter (NYY, American); Ryan Howard (PHI, National).
- Roberto Clemente Award (Humanitarian): Carlos Delgado (NYM).
- Rolaids Relief Man Award: Francisco Rodríguez (LAA, American); Trevor Hoffman (SD, National).
- Delivery Man of the Year (Best Reliever): Mariano Rivera (NYY).
- Warren Spahn Award (Best left-handed pitcher): Johan Santana (MIN)

=== Player of the Month ===
Month	American League	National League
April	Jason Giambi	Albert Pujols
May	Alex Rodriguez	Jason Bay
June	Joe Mauer	David Wright
July	David Ortiz	Chase Utley
August	Travis Hafner	Ryan Howard
September	Robinson Canó	Ryan Howard

=== Pitcher of the Month ===
Month	American League	National League
April	José Contreras	Greg Maddux
May	CC Sabathia	Jason Schmidt
June	Johan Santana	Chris Young
July	John Lackey	Carlos Zambrano
August	Esteban Loaiza	Derek Lowe
September	Johan Santana	Roy Oswalt

=== Rookie of the Month ===
Month	American League	National League
April	Jonathan Papelbon	Prince Fielder
May	Justin Verlander	Josh Johnson
June	Francisco Liriano	Josh Johnson; Dan Uggla
July	Francisco Liriano	Josh Barfield
August	Nick Markakis	Chris Duncan
September	Boof Bonser	Aníbal Sánchez

== Statistical leaders ==
Statistic	American League		National League	
AVG	Joe Mauer, MIN	.347	Freddy Sanchez, PIT	.344
HR	David Ortiz, BOS	54	Ryan Howard, PHI	58
RBI	David Ortiz, BOS	137	Ryan Howard, PHI	149
Wins	Johan Santana, MIN; Chien-Ming Wang, NYY	19	Aaron Harang, CIN; Derek Lowe, LAD; Brad Penny, LAD; John Smoltz, ATL; Brandon Webb, AZ; Carlos Zambrano, CHC	16
ERA	Johan Santana, MIN	2.77	Roy Oswalt, HOU	2.98
SO	Johan Santana, MIN	245	Aaron Harang, CIN	216
SV	Francisco Rodríguez, LAA	47	Trevor Hoffman, SD	46
SB	Carl Crawford, TB	58	José Reyes, NYM	64

== Managers ==
=== American League ===
Team	Manager	Comments
Baltimore Orioles	Sam Perlozzo	
Boston Red Sox	Terry Francona	
Chicago White Sox	Ozzie Guillén	
Cleveland Indians	Eric Wedge	
Detroit Tigers	Jim Leyland	Won the ALCS, replacing Alan Trammell
Kansas City Royals	Buddy Bell	
Los Angeles Angels	Mike Scioscia	
Minnesota Twins	Ron Gardenhire	
New York Yankees	Joe Torre	
Oakland Athletics	Ken Macha (Macha was replaced by Bob Geren)	
Seattle Mariners	Mike Hargrove	
Tampa Bay Devil Rays	Joe Maddon	
Texas Rangers	Buck Showalter (Showalter was replaced with Ron Washington)	
Toronto Blue Jays	John Gibbons	

=== National League ===
Team	Manager	Comments
Arizona Diamondbacks	Bob Melvin	
Atlanta Braves	Bobby Cox	
Chicago Cubs	Dusty Baker (Baker was replaced by Lou Piniella)	
Cincinnati Reds	Jerry Narron	
Colorado Rockies	Clint Hurdle	
Florida Marlins	Joe Girardi (Girardi was replaced by Fredi González)	
Houston Astros	Phil Garner	
Los Angeles Dodgers	Grady Little	
Milwaukee Brewers	Ned Yost	
New York Mets	Willie Randolph	
Philadelphia Phillies	Charlie Manuel	
Pittsburgh Pirates±	Jim Tracy	
St. Louis Cardinals	Tony La Russa	Won the World Series
San Diego Padres	Bruce Bochy (Bochy was replaced by Bud Black)	
San Francisco Giants	Felipe Alou (Alou was replaced by Bruce Bochy)	
Washington Nationals	Frank Robinson (Robinson was replaced by Manny Acta)	

±hosted the MLB All Star Game

== Milestones ==
=== 300–300 Club members ===
- Reggie Sanders – June 10
- Steve Finley – June 14

=== Home runs ===
The following players reached major home run milestones in 2006:

==== Barry Bonds' countdown to 715 ====
- May 21 – reached 714 career homers, tying Babe Ruth for second all time
- May 28 – reached 715 career homers, passing Ruth for second all time

==== 400 career homers ====
- Mike Piazza – April 26
- Carlos Delgado – August 22

==== 300 career homers ====
- Jeromy Burnitz – April 4
- Moisés Alou – April 13
- Reggie Sanders – June 10 (also joining the 300–300 club)
- Steve Finley – June 14 (also joining the 300–300 club)

==== 200 career homers ====
- Jeff Conine – April 16
- Magglio Ordóñez – April 29
- Eric Chavez – May 2
- Jermaine Dye – May 14
- Carlos Lee – May 24
- Phil Nevin – June 19
- Lance Berkman – June 21
- Carl Everett – June 21
- Nomar Garciaparra – June 25
- David Ortiz – June 29
- Alfonso Soriano – August 13
- Bobby Abreu – August 22
- Carlos Beltrán – August 26

==== Entry into the top 500 ====
- Trot Nixon on April 5 with his 126th career homer
- Jason Varitek on June 13 with his 126th career homer
- Vernon Wells on June 14 with his 126th career homer
- Aubrey Huff on July 1 with his 126th career homer
- Raúl Ibañez on July 15 with his 126th career homer
- Mark Teixeira on August 19 with his 127th career homer

=== Pitching ===
- Trevor Hoffman of the San Diego Padres broke Lee Smith's record of 478 Saves on September 24, 2006, at Petco Park.

=== Hitting ===
- Bill Hall, Damian Miller, Brady Clark, J. J. Hardy, and Prince Fielder of the MIL become the fifth group of players in Major League history to hit five home runs in one inning in the fourth inning against the Cincinnati Reds on April 22.
- Alfonso Soriano of the Washington Nationals become only the fourth player to join the 40–40 club, joining José Canseco, Barry Bonds, and Alex Rodriguez when he stole his 40th base of the season on September 16. Six days later he became the first person to reach 40 home runs, 40 stolen bases and 40 doubles in one season.
- Jeff Kent, J.D. Drew, Mike Lowell, and Jason Varitek of the Los Angeles Dodgers became the fourth group of players to hit four consecutive home runs in the ninth inning on September 18 against the San Diego Padres.

=== Other achievements ===
- Matt Holliday hit the longest home run of the season in MLB against the San Francisco Giants on September 19 with an official distance of 443 feet (135 m); HitTracker estimated it at 496 feet (151 m).

== Home field attendance and payroll ==
Team name	Wins	%±	Home attendance	%±	Per game	Est. payroll	%±
New York Yankees	97	2.1%	4,248,067	3.8%	52,445	$194,663,079	−6.5%
Los Angeles Dodgers	88	23.9%	3,758,545	4.3%	46,402	$98,447,187	18.6%
St. Louis Cardinals	83	−17.0%	3,407,104	−3.7%	42,589	$88,891,371	−3.5%
Los Angeles Angels of Anaheim	89	−6.3%	3,406,790	0.1%	42,059	$103,472,000	9.1%
New York Mets	97	16.9%	3,379,535	19.4%	41,723	$101,584,963	0.3%
San Francisco Giants	76	1.3%	3,130,313	−1.6%	38,646	$90,056,419	−0.2%
Chicago Cubs	66	−16.5%	3,123,215	0.7%	38,558	$94,424,499	8.5%
Houston Astros	82	−7.9%	3,022,763	7.8%	37,318	$100,894,435	31.4%
Chicago White Sox	90	−9.1%	2,957,414	26.2%	36,511	$102,750,667	36.7%
Boston Red Sox	86	−9.5%	2,930,588	2.9%	36,180	$120,099,824	−2.8%
Philadelphia Phillies	85	−3.4%	2,701,815	1.4%	33,356	$88,273,333	−7.6%
San Diego Padres	88	7.3%	2,659,757	−7.3%	32,837	$69,896,141	10.4%
Detroit Tigers	95	33.8%	2,595,937	28.2%	32,049	$82,612,866	19.6%
Atlanta Braves	79	−12.2%	2,550,524	1.2%	31,488	$90,156,876	4.3%
Seattle Mariners	78	13.0%	2,481,165	−9.0%	30,632	$87,959,833	0.2%
Texas Rangers	80	1.3%	2,388,757	−5.4%	29,491	$68,228,662	22.2%
Milwaukee Brewers	75	−7.4%	2,335,643	5.6%	28,835	$57,970,333	45.2%
Toronto Blue Jays	87	8.8%	2,302,212	14.3%	28,422	$71,365,000	56.1%
Minnesota Twins	96	15.7%	2,285,018	12.3%	28,210	$63,396,006	12.8%
Baltimore Orioles	70	−5.4%	2,153,139	−18.0%	26,582	$72,585,582	−1.8%
Washington Nationals	71	−12.3%	2,153,056	−21.2%	26,581	$63,143,000	30.0%
Cincinnati Reds	80	9.6%	2,134,607	9.9%	26,353	$60,909,519	−1.6%
Colorado Rockies	76	13.4%	2,104,362	9.9%	25,980	$41,233,000	−13.8%
Arizona Diamondbacks	76	−1.3%	2,091,685	1.6%	25,823	$59,984,226	−4.2%
Cleveland Indians	78	−16.1%	1,997,995	−0.8%	24,667	$56,031,500	35.0%
Oakland Athletics	93	5.7%	1,976,625	−6.3%	24,403	$64,843,079	17.0%
Pittsburgh Pirates	67	0.0%	1,861,549	2.4%	22,982	$46,717,750	22.5%
Kansas City Royals	62	10.7%	1,372,638	0.1%	16,946	$47,694,000	29.3%
Tampa Bay Devil Rays	61	−9.0%	1,368,950	19.9%	16,901	$34,917,967	17.7%
Florida Marlins	78	−6.0%	1,164,134	−37.2%	14,372	$14,671,500	−75.7%

== Television coverage ==
This was the sixth and final season that national television coverage was split between ESPN and Fox Sports (TBS would then be added to televising national coverage in 2007). ESPN and ESPN2 aired selected weeknight and Sunday night games, and selected Division Series playoff games. Fox televised Saturday baseball, the All-Star Game, selected Division Series games, both League Championship Series, and the World Series.

== Events ==
- April 3 – The Florida Marlins set a modern major-league record by starting six rookies in their opening day 1–0 loss to the Houston Astros.

== See also ==
- 2006 Nippon Professional Baseball season
- 2006 in baseball
