= Bears–Vikings rivalry =

National Football League rivalry

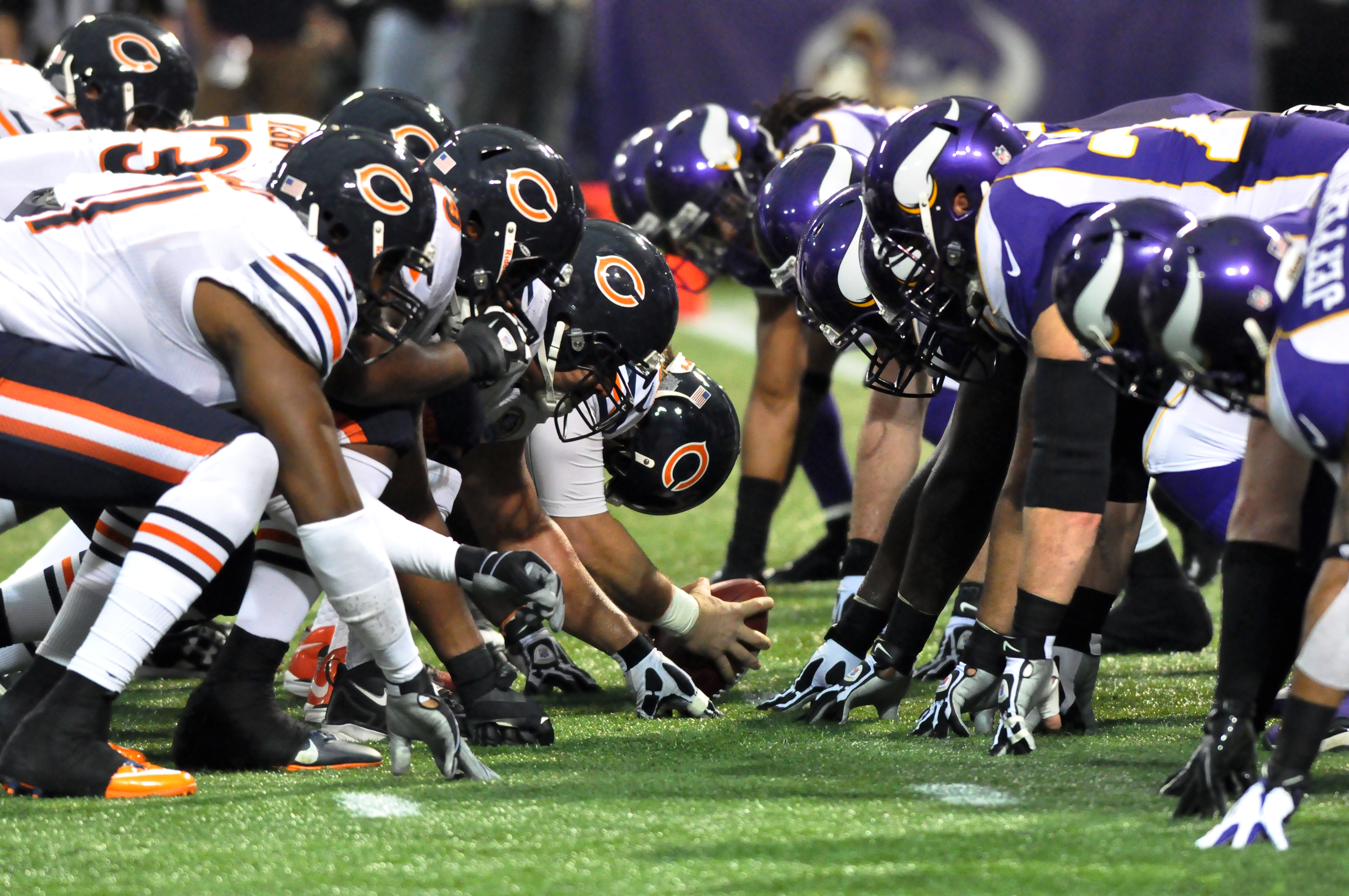
- Bears and Vikings face off during the 2012 season.

- Chicago Bears Minnesota Vikings
- Location: Chicago, Minneapolis
- First meeting: September 17, 1961; Vikings 37, Bears 13
- Latest meeting: September 20, 2026; Vikings 9, Bears 3
- Next meeting: January 9/10, 2027
- Stadiums: Bears: Soldier Field; Vikings: U.S. Bank Stadium

Statistics
- Total meetings: 130
- All-time series: Vikings: 70–59–2
- Regular season series: Vikings: 70–58–2
- Postseason results: Bears: 1–0
- Largest victory: Bears: 34–3 (1984), 38–7 (1989); Vikings: 31–0 (1969)
- Most points scored: Bears: 52 (1961); Vikings: 48 (1998)
- Longest win streak: Bears: 6 (1983–1986, 2009–2012); Vikings: 8 (1972–1976)
- Current win streak: Vikings: 1 (2026–present)

Post-season history
- 1994 NFC Wild Card: Bears won: 35–18
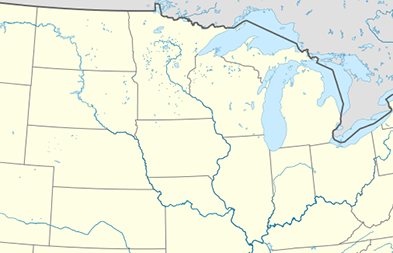

The Bears–Vikings rivalry is a National Football League (NFL) rivalry between the Chicago Bears and Minnesota Vikings.

The rivalry began in the 1961, when the Vikings joined the NFL as an expansion team and were placed in the NFL Western Conference, alongside the Bears. The Vikings' inaugural game as a franchise took place in Minnesota against the Bears, culminating in a Vikings' victory. As members of the NFC North, these two teams face each other at least twice annually.

The Vikings lead the overall series, 70–59–2. The two teams have met once in the playoffs, with the Bears winning.

== Notable moments ==
- The first meeting between the two teams occurred on September 17, 1961. The upstart Vikings upset the dominant Bears 37–13 in the Vikings' first game as a franchise.
- On October 27, 1968, with :03 left in the game, the Vikings led the Bears 24–23 at Wrigley Field. Bears kicker Mac Percival booted a 47-yard game-winning field goal to give the Bears the 26–24 win.
- On November 28, 1982, the Bears visited the Vikings for their first meeting in the Metrodome. Vikings quarterback Tommy Kramer threw for five touchdown passes, and the Vikings dominated the Bears 35–7.
- In their 1985 Super Bowl run, the Bears met the Vikings in Minnesota for a Thursday Night game on September 19, 1985. The Bears, struggling on offense, trailed 17–9 at the start of the third quarter. Bears' quarterback Jim McMahon convinced coach Mike Ditka to let him play and stepped in the game, having had back spasms prior to the game. On his first throw, McMahon launched a 70-yard touchdown pass, threw a 25-yard touchdown pass on the first play of the next Bears possession to take the lead, and led the Bears to score a third touchdown on the next series. The Bears ended up winning the game 33–24, in a game sometimes called 'The Viking Miracle'. Later in the season, the Bears again beat the Vikings in Chicago, 27–9.
- On October 4, 1992, the Mike Ditka-coached Bears visited Minneapolis and dominated the Vikings for three quarters. Leading 20–0 with the ball in the fourth quarter, Bears quarterback Jim Harbaugh audibled out of a run play and threw an ill-advised pass that was intercepted by Vikings defensive back Todd Scott and returned for a 35-yard touchdown. Afterward, Ditka was seen on the sidelines screaming at Harbaugh over the mistake, which the Vikings used as an emotional springboard for two more fourth-quarter touchdowns – a total of 21 unanswered fourth-quarter points and a 21–20 victory for Minnesota. The Bears, who were 2–2 prior to this game, finished with a 5–11 record and Ditka was fired as Bears coach following the season.
- On January 1, 1995, the Bears met the Vikings in the Metrodome for their first playoff game and, as of 2020, only time in their history together. Despite being swept in the regular season by the Vikings (including a 33–27 overtime Vikings win in Week Fourteen), the Bears beat the Vikings 35–18 in the game.
- On October 14, 2007, the Bears hosted the Vikings at Soldier Field. The game was scoreless until Devin Hester returned a punt for an 89-yard touchdown with two minutes left in the first quarter. On the final play of the first quarter, Vikings quarterback Tarvaris Jackson threw a 60-yard touchdown pass to Troy Williamson. Bears quarterback Brian Griese threw for 373 yards and three touchdowns and two interceptions, while the Vikings, behind rookie running back Adrian Peterson's 224 rushing yards and three scores, gained 311 rushing yards. The Vikings had a 31–17 lead with five minutes to go in regulation, but two Griese touchdowns tied the game with 1:38 left in the game. The Vikings' Ryan Longwell kicked a 55-yard field goal on the final play for a 34–31 Vikings win.
- The highest scoring match-up in the two clubs' history came on October 19, 2008, at Soldier Field. The Bears won 48–41 as Kyle Orton threw for 283 yards and two touchdowns, while the Vikings' Gus Frerotte had 298 passing yards and two touchdowns but threw four interceptions, the last coming in the final two minutes. The Bears scored twice off botched Vikings punts; Garrett Wolfe ran in a 17-yard score off a blocked punt in the first quarter, while in the second the Vikings dropped a punt snap and Zackary Bowman fell on it in the endzone for a Bears touchdown.
- En route to the 2008 division title, the Vikings hosted the Bears on November 30, 2008, and broke out of a close contest with a 99-yard touchdown catch by the Vikings' former Bear Bernard Berrian in the second quarter. The Vikings won 34–14 as Gus Frerotte threw for 201 yards and Adrian Peterson rushed for 131.
- The 11–3 Vikings traveled to Soldier Field on December 28, 2009, for a Monday Night Football match-up with the 5–9 Bears. The Bears manhandled the Vikings in the game's first half, forcing a Brett Favre fumble and scoring on three Robbie Gould field goals and a seven-yard Jay Cutler touchdown to Greg Olsen. Adrian Peterson rushed in a six-yard touchdown in the third but the extra point was no good, and another Cutler touchdown (to Desmond Clark) put the score at 23–6 entering the fourth. Favre had never won a game (in 42 previous tries) in which his team trailed by at least 17 points, but Favre connected with Visanthe Shiancoe in the third, then after a Ryan Longwell field goal Peterson ran in a second touchdown for a 23–23 tie. The Bears clawed downfield and Cutler found Earl Bennett in the endzone, then Favre, on fourth and goal, hit Sidney Rice in the final thirty seconds to tie the game at 30. Gould missed a field goal in overtime, but Peterson caught a Favre pass and then fumbled to the Bears at Minnesota's 39-yard line. Cutler then found Devin Aromashodu for a deep touchdown, ending the game in a wild 36–30 Bears win.
- The scheduled December 20, 2010 meeting at the Metrodome was moved to TCF Bank Stadium after a snowstorm punctured the inflatable roof and caused a collapse. The Bears clinched the NFC North title by beating the Vikings 40–14. Devin Hester broke a tie with Brian Mitchell for most return touchdowns by scoring on a 66-yard punt, the league-record 14th of his career, while Jay Cutler threw for 194 yards and three touchdowns. Brett Favre, initially ruled out of the game, suited up and started, but after a touchdown in the first quarter he was sacked and thrown head-first to the ground; he left the game and did not return, and never played in the NFL again.
- On September 15, 2013, the Bears and Vikings met each other in Week 2 of the 2013 season for a division match-up, the first under new Bears head coach Marc Trestman. Viking Cordarrelle Patterson returned the opening kickoff 105 yards for a touchdown. Bears' quarterback Jay Cutler followed it up with two touchdown passes (to Martellus Bennett and Brandon Marshall) to take a 14–7 lead. A Cutler fumble was returned by Brian Robison 61 yards for a Vikings touchdown. Tim Jennings of the Bears intercepted Vikings' quarterback Christian Ponder for 44 yards to take the lead. Ponder was able to throw a touchdown to tie the game. Robbie Gould kicked a 20-yard field goal for a 24–21 Bears lead at halftime. In the second half, Blair Walsh kicked three field goals for the Vikings, putting them ahead 30–24. With just 10 seconds left in the game, Jay Cutler threw the game-winning touchdown to Martellus Bennett to win 31–30. The win improved the Bears' record to 2–0 while it dropped the Vikings to 0–2.
- On December 1, 2013, the Bears and the Vikings played in a rematch which turned into an overtime thriller. The Bears were missing Cutler due to an injury (Josh McCown played in his place), and Ponder was injured early in game, making way for backup Matt Cassel. McCown played well, leading his team to a 20–10 lead with two TD passes to Alshon Jeffery. However, Cassel and his team responded to that deficit with a reception by Greg Jennings and tied the game with a Blair Walsh field goal with little time to retaliate in the fourth. The Bears tried an improbable 66-yard field goal just following a Devin Hester run which set it up. The kick fell short and land in the hands of Patterson, who tried to make a run of his own which did not go far, and the game went into overtime. Walsh successfully kicked a 39-yard field goal for the Vikings, but his score was negated after a facemask penalty, and he missed a 57-yard field goal thereafter. The Bears tried a 47-yard field goal on second down to win the game quickly, but the ball sailed too far to the right, ending their drive. Once the Vikings got the ball back, they set up a 34-yard field goal for Walsh, which ended up winning the game for the Vikings.
- On December 30, 2018, the 11–4 Bears met the 8–6–1 Vikings at U.S. Bank Stadium in a game with playoff implications. If the Bears won and the Rams lost, the Bears would get the second seed and a first-round bye by virtue of head-to-head tiebreaker. If the Vikings won, they would be in the playoffs as the sixth seed and earn the final playoff spot over the Eagles also by virtue of head-to-head tiebreaker. The Bears won 24–10 with 109 rushing yards and two touchdowns from running back Jordan Howard, eliminating the Vikings and allowing the Eagles to clinch the sixth seed following their win. However, because the Rams won their game, the Bears did not get a first-round bye and ended up losing to the Eagles in the wild-card round. Had the Vikings won, the two teams would have met in the wild-card round at Soldier Field.
- On October 9, 2022, the Vikings lead the Bears 21–3 late in the second quarter. The Bears scored a touchdown with 1:08 left in the second quarter that made it 21–10 by halftime. The Bears though rallied back scoring 19 unanswered points and took a 22–21 lead with 9:31 left in the game. The Vikings however on their next drive drove down the field from their own 25-yard line and scored a touchdown and made a two-point conversion with 2:26 left in the game to lead 29–22. The Bears, however, still had a chance to potentially tie the game and send it to overtime. The Bears started on their own 25 and were able to drive down to their own 46 with 1:14 left in the game. On their 5th play of the drive, Bears quarterback Justin Fields completed a pass to wide receiver and former Viking, Ihmir Smith-Marsette for 15 yards. Marsette tried to get more yards but the ball in his hands was stripped and stolen by Vikings corner Cameron Dantzler. The Vikings ran out the clock and won 29–22.
- On November 24, 2024, The Vikings led the Bears 27–16 with about 29 seconds left of the game. The Bears got a touchdown and were able to get the two point conversion to make it 27–24. The Bears were able to recover the onside kick with 21 seconds left. With one play, the Bears were able to get to field goal range from their own 43 to the Vikings 30 when quarterback Caleb Williams threw a pass to D. J. Moore and were able to stop the clock with 3 seconds left by spiking the ball since the Bears had no timeouts. Bears kicker Cairo Santos was able to make the 48-yard field goal to tie it at 27 and to force overtime. The Bears got the ball first after winning the coin toss but went 3 and out on their first drive and punted it to the Vikings. The Vikings were backed to their own 14 and were able to drive it up to the Bears 9 yard line where Vikings kicker John Parker Romo kicked the field goal to give the Vikings the win 30–27.

== Season-by-season results ==
Chicago Bears vs. Minnesota Vikings Season-by-Season Results
1960s (Bears, 11–5–2)

Season	Season series	at Chicago Bears	at Minnesota Vikings	Overall series	Notes
1961	Tie 1–1	Bears; 52–35	Vikings; 37–13	Tie; 1–1	Vikings join the National Football League (NFL) as an expansion team. They are placed in the NFL Western Conference, resulting in two meetings annually with the Bears. Game in Minnesota was the Vikings' inaugural game as a franchise. In Chicago, Bears score their most points in a game against the Vikings.
1962	Bears 2–0	Bears; 31–30	Bears; 13–0	Bears; 3–1	
1963	Bears 1–0–1	Tie; 17–17	Bears; 28–7	Bears; 4–1–1	
1964	Tie 1–1	Vikings; 41–14	Bears; 34–28	Bears; 5–2–1	
1965	Tie 1–1	Vikings; 24–17	Bears; 45–37	Bears; 6–3–1	
1966	Bears 2–0	Bears; 41–28	Bears; 13–10	Bears; 8–3–1	
1967	Bears 1–0–1	Tie; 10–10	Bears; 17–7	Bears; 9–3–2	As a result of expansion, the two eight-team divisions became two eight-team conferences split into two divisions, with the Bears and Vikings placed in the NFL Central division.
1968	Bears 2–0	Bears; 26–24	Bears; 27–17	Bears; 11–3–2	
1969	Vikings 2–0	Vikings; 31–0	Vikings; 31–14	Bears; 11–5–2	In Chicago, Vikings record their largest victory against the Bears with a 31–point differential. Vikings win 1969 NFL Championship, but lose Super Bowl IV.

1970s (Vikings, 15–5)

Season	Season series	at Chicago Bears	at Minnesota Vikings	Overall series	Notes
1970	Vikings 2–0	Vikings; 24–0	Vikings; 16–13	Bears; 11–7–2	As a result of the AFL–NFL merger, the Bears and Vikings are placed in the NFC Central (later renamed to the NFC North in the 2002 season).
1971	Tie 1–1	Vikings; 27–10	Bears; 20–17	Bears; 12–8–2	Bears open Soldier Field. In Minnesota, Bears overcame a 17–3 fourth-quarter deficit.
1972	Tie 1–1	Bears; 13–10	Vikings; 23–10	Bears; 13–9–2	
1973	Vikings 2–0	Vikings; 22–13	Vikings; 31–13	Bears; 13–11–2	Vikings lose Super Bowl VIII.
1974	Vikings 2–0	Vikings; 17–0	Vikings; 11–7	Tie; 13–13–2	Last season the Bears held the overall series lead. Vikings lose Super Bowl IX.
1975	Vikings 2–0	Vikings; 13–9	Vikings; 28–3	Vikings; 15–13–2	Vikings take the overall series lead.
1976	Tie 1–1	Bears; 14–13	Vikings; 20–19	Vikings; 16–14–2	Vikings win 8 straight meetings (1972–1976). Vikings lose Super Bowl XI.
1977	Tie 1–1	Bears; 10–7	Vikings; 22–16 (OT)	Vikings; 17–15–2	Both teams finished with 9–5 records, but the Vikings clinched the NFC Central based on a better point differential in their head-to-head meetings.
1978	Vikings 2–0	Vikings; 24–20	Vikings; 17–14	Vikings; 19–15–2	
1979	Tie 1–1	Bears; 26–7	Vikings; 30–27	Vikings; 20–16–2	

1980s (Bears, 10–9)

Season	Season series	at Chicago Bears	at Minnesota Vikings	Overall series	Notes
1980	Vikings 2–0	Vikings; 34–14	Vikings; 13–7	Vikings; 22–16–2	
1981	Tie 1–1	Bears; 10–9	Vikings; 24–21	Vikings; 23–17–2	
1982	Vikings 1–0	canceled	Vikings; 35–7	Vikings; 24–17–2	Due to the 1982 NFL players' strike, the game scheduled in Chicago was canceled. Vikings move to Hubert H. Humphrey Metrodome. Vikings win 11 straight home meetings (1972–1982).
1983	Tie 1–1	Vikings; 23–14	Bears; 19–13	Vikings; 25–18–2	
1984	Bears 2–0	Bears; 16–7	Bears; 34–3	Vikings; 25–20–2	In Minnesota, Bears record their largest victory against the Vikings with a 31–point differential. Bears' first season series sweep against the Vikings since the 1968 season.
1985	Bears 2–0	Bears; 27–9	Bears; 33–24	Vikings; 25–22–2	Bears win Super Bowl XX.
1986	Tie 1–1	Bears; 23–0	Vikings; 23–7	Vikings; 26–23–2	Vikings' win ended the Bears' 11-game winning streak against divisional opponents and handed them their first loss of the season after a 6–0 start.
1987	Bears 2–0	Bears; 27–7	Bears; 30–24	Vikings; 26–25–2	
1988	Vikings 2–0	Vikings; 31–7	Vikings; 28–27	Vikings; 28–25–2	Vikings' win in Chicago snapped the Bears' 12-game home division winning streak.
1989	Tie 1–1	Bears; 38–7	Vikings; 27–16	Vikings; 29–26–2	In Chicago, Bears tie their largest victory against the Vikings with a 31–point differential.

1990s (Vikings, 13–8)

Season	Season series	at Chicago Bears	at Minnesota Vikings	Overall series	Notes
1990	Tie 1–1	Bears; 19–16	Vikings; 41–13	Vikings; 30–27–2	
1991	Bears 2–0	Bears; 10–6	Bears; 34–17	Vikings; 30–29–2	
1992	Vikings 2–0	Vikings; 38–10	Vikings; 21–20	Vikings; 32–29–2	In Minnesota, Vikings overcame a 20–0 fourth-quarter deficit.
1993	Vikings 2–0	Vikings; 19–12	Vikings; 10–7	Vikings; 34–29–2	
1994	Vikings 2–0	Vikings; 42–14	Vikings; 33–27 (OT)	Vikings; 36–29–2	
1994 Playoffs	Bears 1–0		Bears; 35–18	Vikings; 36–30–2	NFC Wild Card Round.
1995	Bears 2–0	Bears; 31–14	Bears; 14–6	Vikings; 36–32–2	
1996	Tie 1–1	Vikings; 20–14	Bears; 15–13	Vikings; 37–33–2	
1997	Vikings 2–0	Vikings; 27–24	Vikings; 29–22	Vikings; 39–33–2	
1998	Vikings 2–0	Vikings; 31–28	Vikings; 48–22	Vikings; 41–33–2	In Minnesota, Vikings score their most points in a game against the Bears.
1999	Tie 1–1	Vikings; 27–24 (OT)	Bears; 24–22	Vikings; 42–34–2	

2000s (Tie, 10–10)

Season	Season series	at Chicago Bears	at Minnesota Vikings	Overall series	Notes
2000	Vikings 2–0	Vikings; 28–16	Vikings; 30–27	Vikings; 44–34–2	
2001	Bears 2–0	Bears; 17–10	Bears; 13–6	Vikings; 44–36–2	
2002	Tie 1–1	Bears; 27–23	Vikings; 25–7	Vikings; 45–37–2	Due to Soldier Field undergoing renovations, Bears' home game was played at Memorial Stadium in Champaign.
2003	Tie 1–1	Bears; 13–10	Vikings; 24–13	Vikings; 46–38–2	
2004	Tie 1–1	Bears; 24–14	Vikings; 27–22	Vikings; 47–39–2	
2005	Tie 1–1	Bears; 28–3	Vikings; 34–10	Vikings; 48–40–2	
2006	Bears 2–0	Bears; 23–13	Bears; 19–16	Vikings; 48–42–2	Bears lose Super Bowl XLI.
2007	Vikings 2–0	Vikings; 34–31	Vikings; 20–13	Vikings; 50–42–2	In Chicago, Vikings running back Adrian Peterson finished with 361 all-purpose yards, setting a franchise record for the most in a single game and recording the third-highest total in NFL history.
2008	Tie 1–1	Bears; 48–41	Vikings; 34–14	Vikings; 51–43–2	Game in Chicago is the highest-scoring game in the series and the 20th highest-scoring game in NFL history (89 points).
2009	Tie 1–1	Bears; 36–30 (OT)	Vikings; 36–10	Vikings; 52–44–2	

2010s (Bears, 12–8)

Season	Season series	at Chicago Bears	at Minnesota Vikings	Overall series	Notes
2010	Bears 2–0	Bears; 27–13	Bears; 40–14	Vikings; 52–46–2	Game in Minneapolis was moved to TCF Bank Stadium at the University of Minnesota due to damage to the Metrodome’s roof. The matchup also marked what would become Brett Favre’s final NFL game.
2011	Bears 2–0	Bears; 39–10	Bears; 17–13	Vikings; 52–48–2	
2012	Tie 1–1	Bears; 28–10	Vikings; 21–14	Vikings; 53–49–2	Both teams finished with 10–6 records, but the Vikings clinched the final playoff berth based on a better divisional record, eliminating the Bears from playoff contention.
2013	Tie 1–1	Bears; 31–30	Vikings; 23–20 (OT)	Vikings; 54–50–2	
2014	Tie 1–1	Bears; 21–13	Vikings; 13–9	Vikings; 55–51–2	Vikings move to TCF Bank Stadium.
2015	Vikings 2–0	Vikings; 23–20	Vikings; 38–17	Vikings; 57–51–2	
2016	Tie 1–1	Bears; 20–10	Vikings; 38–10	Vikings; 58–52–2	Vikings open U.S. Bank Stadium.
2017	Vikings 2–0	Vikings; 20–17	Vikings; 23–10	Vikings; 60–52–2	
2018	Bears 2–0	Bears; 25–20	Bears; 24–10	Vikings; 60–54–2	In Minnesota, Bears' win, coupled with an Eagles' win against the Redskins, resulted in the Vikings being eliminated from playoff contention.
2019	Bears 2–0	Bears; 16–6	Bears; 21–19	Vikings; 60–56–2	

2020s (Vikings, 10–3)

Season	Season series	at Chicago Bears	at Minnesota Vikings	Overall series	Notes
2020	Tie 1–1	Vikings; 19–13	Bears; 33–27	Vikings; 61–57–2	
2021	Vikings 2–0	Vikings; 17–9	Vikings; 31–17	Vikings; 63–57–2	
2022	Vikings 2–0	Vikings; 29–13	Vikings; 29–22	Vikings; 65–57–2	In Chicago, Bears' loss clinched them the first overall pick in the 2023 NFL draft.
2023	Tie 1–1	Vikings; 19–13	Bears; 12–10	Vikings; 66–58–2	
2024	Vikings 2–0	Vikings; 30–27 (OT)	Vikings; 30–12	Vikings; 68–58–2	
2025	Tie 1–1	Vikings; 27–24	Bears; 19–17	Vikings; 69–59–2	In Minnesota, Bears kicker Cairo Santos kicked a 48-yard game-winning field goal on the game's final play.
2026	Vikings 1–0	Vikings; 9–3	January 9/10	Vikings; 70–59–2	

Summary of results

Season	Season series	at Chicago Bears	at Minnesota Vikings	Notes
Regular season	Vikings 70–58–2	Bears 33–30–2	Vikings 40–25	
Postseason	Bears 1–0	no games	Bears 1–0	NFC Wild Card: 1994
Regular and postseason	Vikings 70–59–2	Bears 33–30–2	Vikings 40–26	Bears are 1–0 at Memorial Stadium in Champaign (2002), accounted for as a Bears' home game.

== Players that played for both teams ==
Name	Pos.	Years with Bears	Years with Vikings
Jared Allen	DE	2014–2015	2008–2013
D'Wayne Bates	WR	1999–2001	2002–2003
Bill Brown	RB	1961	1962-1974
Bob Grim	WR	1975	1967–1971, 1976–1977
Mike Hartenstine	DE	1975–1986	1987
Alan Page	DT	1978–1981	1967–1978
Jim McMahon	QB	1982-1988	1993
Robert Green	RB	1993–1996	1997
Chester Taylor	RB	2010	2006–2009
Corey Wootton	DE	2010–2013	2014
Cordarrelle Patterson	WR/RB/RS	2019–2020	2013–2016
Ihmir Smith-Marsette	WR	2022	2021
Duke Shelley	CB	2019–2021	2022
Yannick Ngakoue	DE	2023	2020

== See also ==
- List of NFL rivalries
- NFC North
- Twins–White Sox rivalry
- Blackhawks–Wild rivalry
