= Twins–White Sox rivalry =

Major League Baseball rivalry

- Minnesota Twins Chicago White Sox
- Location: Midwestern United States
- First meeting: June 2, 1901; South Side Park, Chicago, Illinois; Senators 7, White Stockings 5
- Latest meeting: September 6, 2026; Rate Field, Chicago, Illinois; White Sox 10, Twins 1
- Next meeting: June 10, 2027; Target Field, Minneapolis, Minnesota
- Stadiums: Twins: Target Field; White Sox: Rate Field

Statistics
- Total meetings: 2,351
- Regular season series: White Sox, 1,201–1,135–15 (.514)
- Largest victory: Twins, 20–1 (May 21, 2009); White Sox, 20–2 (June 17, 1956)
- Longest win streak: Twins, 10 (September 8, 1965–June 12, 1966); White Sox, 13 (July 29, 1909–May 10, 1910)
- Current win streak: White Sox, 1

Locations of the Minnesota Twins and Chicago White Sox

The Twins–White Sox rivalry is a Major League Baseball (MLB) rivalry between the Minnesota Twins and the Chicago White Sox. Both clubs are members of MLB's American League (AL) Central division. Both teams were founding members of the AL; they have played each other annually since 1901 when the Twins played as the Washington Senators and the White Sox played as the White Stockings. However, the rivalry did not begin in earnest until the 2000s, when the White Sox and Twins consistently battled for the AL Central crown. The White Sox lead the overall series, 1,201–1,135–15. The teams have never played each other in the Major League Baseball postseason.

The most prominent meeting between the two teams occurred in the 2008 American League Central tie-breaker game, which was necessitated by the two clubs finishing the season with identical records. The White Sox won this game 1–0 on a Jim Thome home run. The series is of special importance in the Upper Midwest where the White Sox and Twins remain popular teams in areas of Wisconsin and Iowa and the fanbases intersect.

== History ==
=== 1960s–1990s ===
While the series dates back to 1901, the teams became regional rivals after the then-Washington Senators moved to Minnesota and became the Twins in 1961. The 1965 season saw the Twins and White Sox finish first and second in the American League Standings, with the Twins winning the pennant by seven games. Both teams were placed in the AL West following the 1969 realignment, but inconsistent play from both teams throughout the 1970s and 1980s prevented a rivalry from developing.

Both teams found limited success in the early 1990s, with the Twins winning the AL West in 1991 by eight games over the second place White Sox on their way to a second World Series title in five years, and the White Sox winning the division in 1993. In 1994, both teams were placed in the newly formed AL Central but both teams declined throughout the remainder of the decade.

=== 2000s ===
The rivalry took shape in the 2000s as both teams consistently competed for the AL Central title. The Twins won three consecutive division titles from 2002–2004, with the Sox coming in second place each year. The 2003 season proved to be the closest, as Minnesota would win the division by four games after trailing Chicago by 7 1/2 games at the All-Star Break. From September 16–18, 2003, Minnesota completed a pivotal three-game sweep of Chicago, holding the White Sox to a combined seven runs and extending its division lead from a half-game to 3 1/2 games.

After the 2005 White Sox dominated the AL Central en route to their World Series title, the Twins retook the division in 2006, finishing one game ahead of the Detroit Tigers and just six ahead of the third-place White Sox. The 2006 season was noted for White Sox manager Ozzie Guillen referring to the Twins players as "little piranhas".

In 2008, The White Sox led the AL Central for most of the season. The Twins spent much of the season in second place behind the White Sox. In the penultimate series of the season from September 23–25, the Twins swept the White Sox to take a half-game lead. Both the Twins and White Sox lost two of three in their final series, forcing Chicago to play a make-up against the Detroit Tigers, which had been rained out earlier in September. The White Sox won this game, leaving the Sox and Twins tied atop the AL Central at 88–74, forcing a tie-breaker game to decide the division champion.

Chicago won the coin toss for home field advantage for the tiebreaker based on the rules at the time; White Sox fans were encouraged to wear black, leading to this game being called the "Blackout Game." The White Sox won the game, 1–0, on the strength of a Jim Thome home run in the 7th inning. Chicago starting pitcher John Danks, pitching on three days rest, pitched eight shutout innings and closer Bobby Jenks pitched the 9th to earn the save.

=== 2010s ===
The 2010 season saw the Twins come back from down 5 1/2 games behind the White Sox in mid-July to win the division by 6 games; The Twins won 10 of 12 head-to-head meetings over the White Sox late in the season.

On May 3, 2011, Twins pitcher Francisco Liriano threw a no-hitter in a 1–0 win over the White Sox, the only no-hitter in the series between the two teams. The next season, Liriano was traded to the White Sox in exchange for Eduardo Escobar and Pedro Hernández. As Liriano struggled with the command of his pitches, the White Sox removed him from the rotation in September.

The rivalry cooled off throughout the 2010s as neither team found consistent success. Minnesota would make playoff appearances in 2017 and 2019, while the White Sox failed to make the playoffs throughout the decade.

=== 2020s ===
The Twins won the AL Central in the COVID-19-shortened 2020 season with a record of 36–24, finishing just one game ahead of the White Sox and the Cleveland Indians. Both the Twins and White Sox made it to the postseason, marking the first time both teams would qualify. However, both lost their respective Wild Card Series.

On May 17, 2021, The White Sox were already comfortably ahead the Twins 15–4 in the top of the ninth inning. The Twins position player Willians Astudillo pitching. On a 3–0 count, White Sox catcher Yermín Mercedes hit a home run off of Astudillo to increase the score to 16–4. This was criticized by his own manager Tony La Russa for violating the unwritten rules of baseball. The rule said: "do not swing on a 3–0 count when your team is comfortably ahead." The next day, Twins pitcher Tyler Duffey threw behind Mercedes, possibly in an attempt to hit him. The umpires discussed and then threw Duffey out of the game believing it was intentional. Duffey was also suspended for two games. The White Sox ended up winning the AL Central division finishing with a record of 93–69, while the Twins finished in last with a 73–89 record.

== Season-by-season results ==
Twins vs. White Sox Season-by-Season Results
1900s (White Sox, 130–57–5)

Season	Season series		at Washington Senators	at Chicago White Stockings/White Sox	Overall series	Notes
1901	White Stockings	10‍–‍8	Tie, 4‍–‍4	White Stockings, 6‍–‍4	White Stockings; 10‍–‍8	First year of American League baseball White Stockings win 1901 AL Pennant; White Stockings take a 5–4 lead on July 25 in the series, a lead they would never relinquish.
1902	White Stockings	12‍–‍7‍–‍1	Tie, 5‍–‍5	White Stockings, 7‍–‍2‍–‍1	White Stockings; 22‍–‍15‍–‍1	
1903	White Stockings	12‍–‍8	Tie, 5‍–‍5	White Stockings, 7‍–‍3	White Stockings; 34‍–‍23‍–‍1	First year of organized Major League Baseball
1904	White Sox	18‍–‍4	White Sox, 8‍–‍3	White Sox, 10‍–‍1	White Sox; 52‍–‍27‍–‍1	White Stockings change their name to "White Sox"
1905	White Sox	14‍–‍8‍–‍1	White Sox, 6‍–‍5	White Sox, 8‍–‍3‍–‍1	White Sox; 66‍–‍35‍–‍2	
1906	White Sox	15‍–‍7	White Sox, 6‍–‍5	White Sox, 9‍–‍2	White Sox; 81‍–‍24‍–‍2	White Sox win 1906 World Series
1907	White Sox	15‍–‍6	White Sox, 8‍–‍2	White Sox, 7‍–‍4	White Sox; 96‍–‍48‍–‍2	
1908	White Sox	15‍–‍6‍–‍2	White Sox, 6‍–‍4‍–‍2	White Sox, 9‍–‍2	White Sox; 111‍–‍54‍–‍4	
1909	White Sox	19‍–‍3‍–‍1	White Sox, 10‍–‍1	White Sox, 9‍–‍2‍–‍1	White Sox; 130‍–‍57‍–‍5	White sox win season series nine straight years.

1910s (White Sox, 109–106–4)

Season	Season series		at Washington Senators	at Chicago White Sox	Overall series	Notes
1910	Senators	13‍–‍9	Senators, 6‍–‍5	Senators, 7‍–‍4	White Sox; 139‍–‍70‍–‍5	White Sox open White Sox Park. First season series win for Senators.
1911	White Sox	13‍–‍9	White Sox, 7‍–‍4	White Sox, 6‍–‍5	White Sox; 152‍–‍79‍–‍5	Senators open National Park on site of destroyed Boundary Field
1912	Senators	13‍–‍9	White Sox, 7‍–‍4	Senators, 9‍–‍2	White Sox; 161‍–‍92‍–‍5	
1913	Tie	11‍–‍11	White Sox, 7‍–‍4	Senators, 7‍–‍4	White Sox; 172‍–‍103‍–‍5	
1914	White Sox	12‍–‍10‍–‍1	Tie, 5‍–‍5‍–‍1	White Sox, 7‍–‍5	White Sox; 184‍–‍113‍–‍6	
1915	Senators	14‍–‍8‍–‍1	Senators, 8‍–‍3	Senators, 6‍–‍5‍–‍1	White Sox; 192‍–‍127‍–‍7	
1916	White Sox	12‍–‍10‍–‍1	Senators, 7‍–‍4‍–‍1	White Sox, 8‍–‍3	White Sox; 204‍–‍137‍–‍8	
1917	White Sox	15‍–‍7‍–‍1	Senators, 6‍–‍5	White Sox, 10‍–‍1‍–‍1	White Sox; 219‍–‍144‍–‍9	White Sox win 1917 World Series, their last until 2005
1918	Senators	13‍–‍6	Senators, 9‍–‍2	Tie, 4‍–‍4	White Sox; 225‍–‍157‍–‍9	
1919	White Sox	14‍–‍6	White Sox, 6‍–‍4	White Sox, 8‍–‍2	White Sox; 239‍–‍163‍–‍9	White Sox lose 1919 World Series in infamous Black Sox Scandal

1920s (Senators, 125–95–1)

Season	Season series		at Washington Senators	at Chicago White Sox	Overall series	Notes
1920	White Sox	17‍–‍5	White Sox, 8‍–‍3	White Sox, 9‍–‍2	White Sox; 256‍–‍168‍–‍9	
1921	Senators	16‍–‍6	Senators, 10‍–‍1	Senators, 6‍–‍5	White Sox; 262‍–‍184‍–‍9	
1922	Senators	15‍–‍7	Senators, 8‍–‍3	Senators, 7‍–‍4	White Sox; 269‍–‍199‍–‍9	
1923	Senators	12‍–‍10‍–‍1	White Sox, 6‍–‍5‍–‍1	Senators, 7‍–‍4	White Sox; 279‍–‍211‍–‍10	
1924	Senators	17‍–‍5	Senators, 9‍–‍2	Senators, 8‍–‍3	White Sox; 284‍–‍228‍–‍10	Senators win 1924 World Series
1925	Senators	13‍–‍9	Senators, 6‍–‍5	Senators, 7‍–‍4	White Sox; 293‍–‍241‍–‍10	Senators lose 1925 World Series
1926	Tie	11‍–‍11	Senators, 7‍–‍4	White Sox, 7‍–‍4	White Sox; 304‍–‍252‍–‍10	
1927	Senators	12‍–‍10	Senators, 8‍–‍4	White Sox, 6‍–‍4	White Sox; 314‍–‍264‍–‍10	
1928	Senators	12‍–‍10	White Sox, 6‍–‍5	Senators, 7‍–‍4	White Sox; 324‍–‍276‍–‍10	
1929	Senators	12‍–‍10	White Sox, 6‍–‍5	Senators, 7‍–‍4	White Sox; 334‍–‍288‍–‍10	

1930s (Senators, 117–102)

Season	Season series		at Washington Senators	at Chicago White Sox	Overall series	Notes
1930	Senators	14‍–‍8	Senators, 8‍–‍3	Senators, 6‍–‍5	White Sox; 342‍–‍302‍–‍10	
1931	Senators	15‍–‍7	Senators, 10‍–‍1	White Sox, 6‍–‍5	White Sox; 349‍–‍317‍–‍10	
1932	Senators	18‍–‍4	Senators, 10‍–‍1	Senators, 8‍–‍3	White Sox; 353‍–‍335‍–‍10	
1933	Senators	15‍–‍7	White Sox, 6‍–‍5	Senators, 10‍–‍1	White Sox; 360‍–‍350‍–‍10	Senators lose 1933 World Series
1934	Senators	13‍–‍9	Senators, 8‍–‍3	White Sox, 6‍–‍5	White Sox; 369‍–‍363‍–‍10	
1935	White Sox	12‍–‍10	White Sox, 6‍–‍5	White Sox, 6‍–‍5	White Sox; 381‍–‍373‍–‍10	White Sox' first season series win since 1920.
1936	White Sox	16‍–‍5	White Sox, 9‍–‍2	White Sox, 7‍–‍3	White Sox; 397‍–‍378‍–‍10	
1937	White Sox	14‍–‍8	White Sox, 7‍–‍4	White Sox, 7‍–‍4	White Sox; 411‍–‍386‍–‍10	
1938	Senators	11‍–‍10	Senators, 6‍–‍5	Tie, 5‍–‍5	White Sox; 421‍–‍397‍–‍10	
1939	White Sox	14‍–‍8	White Sox, 6‍–‍5	White Sox, 8‍–‍3	White Sox; 436‍–‍405‍–‍10	

1940s (White Sox, 124–93–1)

Season	Season series		at Washington Senators	at Chicago White Sox	Overall series	Notes
1940	White Sox	12‍–‍10	White Sox, 6‍–‍5	White Sox, 6‍–‍5	White Sox; 448‍–‍415‍–‍10	
1941	White Sox	13‍–‍9	White Sox, 7‍–‍4	White Sox, 6‍–‍5	White Sox; 461‍–‍424‍–‍10	
1942	White Sox	13‍–‍7	Tie, 6‍–‍6	White Sox, 7‍–‍1	White Sox; 474‍–‍431‍–‍10	
1943	White Sox	14‍–‍8	White Sox, 8‍–‍3	White Sox, 6‍–‍5	White Sox; 488‍–‍439‍–‍10	
1944	White Sox	16‍–‍6	Senators, 6‍–‍5	White Sox, 11‍–‍0	White Sox; 504‍–‍445‍–‍10	White Sox win 12 straight home meetings (1943–1944)
1945	Senators	14‍–‍8	Senators, 7‍–‍4	Senators, 7‍–‍4	White Sox; 512‍–‍459‍–‍10	
1946	Senators	12‍–‍10	Senators, 6‍–‍4	Tie, 6‍–‍6	White Sox; 522‍–‍471‍–‍10	
1947	White Sox	14‍–‍8	White Sox, 9‍–‍2	Senators, 6‍–‍5	White Sox; 536‍–‍479‍–‍10	
1948	Senators	12‍–‍9‍–‍1	Senators, 7‍–‍4‍–‍1	Tie, 5‍–‍5	White Sox; 545‍–‍491‍–‍11	
1949	White Sox	15‍–‍7	White Sox, 9‍–‍2	White Sox, 6‍–‍5	White Sox; 560‍–‍498‍–‍11	

1950s (White Sox, 141–79–1)

Season	Season series		at Washington Senators	at Chicago White Sox	Overall series	Notes
1950	Senators	14‍–‍8	Senators, 7‍–‍4	Senators, 7‍–‍4	White Sox; 568‍–‍512‍–‍11	
1951	White Sox	14‍–‍8	White Sox, 9‍–‍2	Senators, 6‍–‍5	White Sox; 582‍–‍520‍–‍11	
1952	White Sox	13‍–‍9‍–‍1	White Sox, 8‍–‍3	Senators, 6‍–‍5‍–‍1	White Sox; 595‍–‍529‍–‍12	
1953	White Sox	12‍–‍10	Senators, 6‍–‍5	White Sox, 7‍–‍4	White Sox; 607‍–‍539‍–‍12	
1954	White Sox	15‍–‍7	White Sox, 8‍–‍3	White Sox, 7‍–‍4	White Sox; 622‍–‍546‍–‍12	
1955	White Sox	17‍–‍5	White Sox, 9‍–‍2	White Sox, 8‍–‍3	White Sox; 639‍–‍551‍–‍12	
1956	White Sox	13‍–‍9	Senators, 6‍–‍5	White Sox, 8‍–‍3	White Sox; 652‍–‍560‍–‍12	
1957	White Sox	17‍–‍5	White Sox, 9‍–‍2	White Sox, 8‍–‍3	White Sox; 669‍–‍565‍–‍12	
1958	White Sox	16‍–‍6	White Sox, 6‍–‍5	White Sox, 10‍–‍1	White Sox; 685‍–‍571‍–‍12	
1959	White Sox	16‍–‍6	White Sox, 8‍–‍3	White Sox, 8‍–‍3	White Sox; 701‍–‍577‍–‍12	White Sox lose 1959 World Series

1960s (Senators/Twins, 101–83–1)

Season	Season series		at Washington Senators/Minnesota Twins	at Chicago White Sox	Overall series	Notes
1960	White Sox	14‍–‍8	White Sox, 8‍–‍3	White Sox, 6‍–‍5	White Sox; 715‍–‍585‍–‍12	
1961	Tie	9‍–‍9‍–‍1	Twins, 5‍–‍4‍–‍1	White Sox, 5‍–‍4	White Sox; 724‍–‍594‍–‍13	AL Expansion reduces season series from 22 meetings to 18. Senators relocate to Minnesota and rebrand as the "Minnesota Twins", playing at Metropolitan Stadium.
1962	Twins	10‍–‍8	White Sox, 5‍–‍4	Twins, 6‍–‍3	White Sox; 732‍–‍604‍–‍13	
1963	Twins	10‍–‍8	Twins, 6‍–‍3	White Sox, 5‍–‍4	White Sox; 740‍–‍614‍–‍13	
1964	Tie	9‍–‍9	Twins, 6‍–‍3	White Sox, 6‍–‍3	White Sox; 749‍–‍623‍–‍13	
1965	Twins	11‍–‍7	Twins, 5‍–‍4	Twins, 6‍–‍3	White Sox; 756‍–‍634‍–‍13	Twins lose 1965 World Series
1966	Twins	14‍–‍4	Twins, 7‍–‍2	Twins, 7‍–‍2	White Sox; 760‍–‍648‍–‍13	
1967	Tie	9‍–‍9	Twins, 6‍–‍3	White Sox, 6‍–‍3	White Sox; 769‍–‍657‍–‍13	
1968	White Sox	10‍–‍8	Twins, 5‍–‍4	White Sox, 6‍–‍3	White Sox; 779‍–‍665‍–‍13	
1969	Twins	13‍–‍5	Twins, 8‍–‍1	Twins, 5‍–‍4	White Sox; 784‍–‍678‍–‍13	Both teams placed in AL West as the league splits into divisions

1970s (Twins, 89–76–1)

Season	Season series		at Minnesota Twins	at Chicago White Sox	Overall series	Notes
1970	Twins	12‍–‍6	Twins, 5‍–‍4	Twins, 7‍–‍2	White Sox; 790‍–‍690‍–‍13	
1971	Twins	11‍–‍7	Twins, 6‍–‍3	Twins, 5‍–‍4	White Sox; 797‍–‍701‍–‍13	
1972	White Sox	8‍–‍6	White Sox, 3‍–‍2	White Sox, 5‍–‍4	White Sox; 805‍–‍707‍–‍13	Season series reduced to 14 games due to 1972 Major League Baseball strike
1973	Tie	9‍–‍9	White Sox, 6‍–‍3	Twins, 6‍–‍3	White Sox; 814‍–‍716‍–‍13	
1974	Twins	11‍–‍7‍–‍1	Twins, 6‍–‍3‍–‍1	Twins, 5‍–‍4	White Sox; 821‍–‍727‍–‍14	
1975	Tie	9‍–‍9	Twins, 5‍–‍4	White Sox, 5‍–‍4	White Sox; 830‍–‍736‍–‍14	
1976	Twins	11‍–‍7	Twins, 5‍–‍4	Twins, 6‍–‍3	White Sox; 837‍–‍747‍–‍14	
1977	White Sox	10‍–‍5	White Sox, 4‍–‍3	White Sox, 6‍–‍2	White Sox; 847‍–‍752‍–‍14	AL expansion reduces season series to 15 meetings per year
1978	White Sox	8‍–‍7	White Sox, 5‍–‍3	Twins, 4‍–‍3	White Sox; 855‍–‍759‍–‍14	
1979	Twins	8‍–‍5	Tie, 3‍–‍3	Twins, 5‍–‍2	White Sox; 860‍–‍767‍–‍14	

1980s (Twins, 66–57)

Season	Season series		at Minnesota Twins	at Chicago White Sox	Overall series	Notes
1980	Twins	8‍–‍5	Twins, 5‍–‍2	Tie, 3‍–‍3	White Sox; 865‍–‍775‍–‍14	
1981	Twins	4‍–‍2	Twins, 3‍–‍0	White Sox, 2‍–‍1	White Sox; 867‍–‍779‍–‍14	Strike-shortened season
1982	White Sox	7‍–‍6	Twins, 4‍–‍3	White Sox, 4‍–‍2	White Sox; 874‍–‍785‍–‍14	Twins open Hubert H. Humphrey Metrodome
1983	White Sox	8‍–‍5	Tie, 3‍–‍3	White Sox, 5‍–‍2	White Sox; 882‍–‍790‍–‍14	
1984	White Sox	8‍–‍5	White Sox, 4‍–‍3	White Sox, 4‍–‍2	White Sox; 890‍–‍795‍–‍14	
1985	Twins	7‍–‍6	Tie, 3‍–‍3	Twins, 4‍–‍3	White Sox; 896‍–‍802‍–‍14	
1986	Twins	7‍–‍6	Twins, 5‍–‍2	White Sox, 4‍–‍2	White Sox; 902‍–‍809‍–‍14	
1987	Twins	7‍–‍6	Twins, 4‍–‍2	White Sox, 4‍–‍3	White Sox; 908‍–‍816‍–‍14	Twins win 1987 World Series
1988	Twins	9‍–‍4	Twins, 5‍–‍2	Twins, 4‍–‍2	White Sox; 912‍–‍825‍–‍14	
1989	Twins	8‍–‍5	Twins, 4‍–‍2	Twins, 4‍–‍3	White Sox; 917‍–‍833‍–‍14	

1990s (White Sox, 71–48–1)

Season	Season series		at Minnesota Twins	at Chicago White Sox	Overall series	Notes
1990	White Sox	7‍–‍6	White Sox, 4‍–‍3	Tie, 3‍–‍3	White Sox; 924‍–‍839‍–‍14	
1991	White Sox	8‍–‍5	White Sox, 4‍–‍2	White Sox, 4‍–‍3	White Sox; 932‍–‍844‍–‍14	White Sox open new Comiskey Park; Twins win 1991 World Series
1992	White Sox	8‍–‍5	Twins, 4‍–‍3	White Sox, 5‍–‍1	White Sox; 940‍–‍849‍–‍14	
1993	White Sox	10‍–‍3	White Sox, 5‍–‍1	White Sox, 5‍–‍2	White Sox; 950‍–‍852‍–‍14	
1994	Twins	4‍–‍2	Twins, 4‍–‍0	White Sox, 2‍–‍0	White Sox; 952‍–‍856‍–‍14	Strike-shortened season. Strike cancels postseason.
1995	White Sox	10‍–‍3	White Sox, 5‍–‍2	White Sox, 5‍–‍1	White Sox; 962‍–‍859‍–‍14	Strike-shortened season.
1996	Twins	7‍–‍6	Twins, 4‍–‍2	White Sox, 4‍–‍3	White Sox; 968‍–‍866‍–‍14	
1997	Tie	6‍–‍6	Tie, 3‍–‍3	Tie, 3‍–‍3	White Sox; 974‍–‍872‍–‍14	
1998	Tie	6‍–‍6	Tie, 3‍–‍3	Tie, 3‍–‍3	White Sox; 980‍–‍878‍–‍14	
1999	White Sox	8‍–‍3‍–‍1	White Sox, 4‍–‍2	White Sox, 4‍–‍1‍–‍1	White Sox; 988‍–‍881‍–‍15	

2000s (Twins, 98–82)

Season	Season series		at Minnesota Twins	at Chicago White Sox	Overall series	Notes
2000	White Sox	7‍–‍5	White Sox, 4‍–‍2	Tie, 3‍–‍3	White Sox; 995‍–‍886‍–‍15	
2001	Twins	14‍–‍5	Twins, 7‍–‍2	Twins, 7‍–‍3	White Sox; 1,000‍–‍900‍–‍15	MLB changed to an unbalanced schedule in 2001, resulting in 18–19 meetings per year
2002	Twins	11‍–‍8	Twins, 7‍–‍3	White Sox, 5‍–‍4	White Sox; 1,008‍–‍911‍–‍15	
2003	Twins	10‍–‍9	Twins, 7‍–‍2	White Sox, 7‍–‍3	White Sox; 1,017‍–‍921‍–‍15	
2004	Twins	10‍–‍9	White Sox, 6‍–‍4	Twins, 6‍–‍3	White Sox; 1,026‍–‍931‍–‍15	
2005	White Sox	11‍–‍7	White Sox, 6‍–‍3	White Sox, 5‍–‍4	White Sox; 1,037‍–‍938‍–‍15	White Sox win 2005 World Series, their first since 1917
2006	Twins	10‍–‍9	Tie, 5‍–‍5	Twins, 5‍–‍4	White Sox; 1,046‍–‍948‍–‍15	
2007	Tie	9‍–‍9	Twins, 5‍–‍4	White Sox, 5‍–‍4	White Sox; 1,055‍–‍957‍–‍15	
2008	Twins	10‍–‍9	Twins, 8‍–‍1	White Sox, 8‍–‍2	White Sox; 1,064‍–‍967‍–‍15	Teams tied atop the AL Central after 162 games, play a tiebreaker game, which was won by the White Sox.
2009	Twins	12‍–‍6	Twins, 7‍–‍2	Twins, 5‍–‍4	White Sox; 1,070‍–‍979‍–‍15	

2010s (Twins, 104–83)

Season	Season series		at Minnesota Twins	at Chicago White Sox	Overall series	Notes
2010	Twins	13‍–‍5	Twins, 6‍–‍3	Twins, 7‍–‍2	White Sox; 1,075‍–‍992‍–‍15	Twins open Target Field
2011	Tie	9‍–‍9	White Sox, 6‍–‍3	Twins, 6‍–‍3	White Sox; 1,084‍–‍1,001‍–‍15	Twins P Francisco Liriano throws a no-hitter against the White Sox, the only no-hitter in the series.
2012	White Sox	14‍–‍4	White Sox, 7‍–‍2	White Sox, 7‍–‍2	White Sox; 1,098‍–‍1,005‍–‍15	
2013	Twins	11‍–‍8	Tie, 5‍–‍5	Twins, 6‍–‍3	White Sox; 1,106‍–‍1,016‍–‍15	
2014	Twins	10‍–‍9	Twins, 6‍–‍4	White Sox, 5‍–‍4	White Sox; 1,115‍–‍1,026‍–‍15	
2015	Twins	13‍–‍6	Twins, 8‍–‍2	Twins, 5‍–‍4	White Sox; 1,121‍–‍1,039‍–‍15	
2016	White Sox	12‍–‍7	White Sox, 6‍–‍4	White Sox, 6‍–‍3	White Sox; 1,133‍–‍1,046‍–‍15	
2017	Twins	12‍–‍7	Twins, 6‍–‍3	Twins, 6‍–‍4	White Sox; 1,140‍–‍1,058‍–‍15	
2018	Twins	12‍–‍7	Twins, 7‍–‍3	Twins, 5‍–‍4	White Sox; 1,147‍–‍1,070‍–‍15	
2019	Twins	13‍–‍6	Twins, 6‍–‍3	Twins, 7‍–‍3	White Sox; 1,153‍–‍1,083‍–‍15	

2020s (Twins, 52–48)

Season	Season series		at Minnesota Twins	at Chicago White Sox	Overall series	Notes
2020	Tie	5‍–‍5	Twins, 2‍–‍1	White Sox, 4‍–‍3	White Sox; 1,158‍–‍1,088‍–‍15	Season shortened to 60 games (with 10 meetings) due to COVID-19 pandemic. Only season in which both teams qualified for playoffs.
2021	White Sox	13‍–‍6	White Sox, 5‍–‍4	White Sox, 8‍–‍2	White Sox; 1,171‍–‍1,094‍–‍15	
2022	Twins	10‍–‍9	Twins, 6‍–‍4	White Sox, 5‍–‍4	White Sox; 1,180‍–‍1,104‍–‍15	
2023	Twins	9‍–‍4	Twins, 5‍–‍1	Twins, 4‍–‍3	White Sox; 1,184‍–‍1,113‍–‍15	Schedule structure modified this season to allow every team to play one series against every interleague team. Shortening meetings from 19 to 13 games.
2024	Twins	12‍–‍1	Twins, 7‍–‍0	Twins, 5‍–‍1	White Sox; 1,185‍–‍1,125‍–‍15	
2025	White Sox	8‍–‍5	White Sox, 5‍–‍2	Tie, 3‍–‍3	White Sox; 1,193‍–‍1,130‍–‍15	
2026	White Sox	8‍–‍5	Tie, 3‍–‍3	White Sox, 5‍–‍2	White Sox; 1,201‍–‍1,135‍–‍15	

Summary of Results

Season	Season series		at Minnesota Twins	at Chicago White Sox	Notes
Washington Senators vs Chicago White Sox	White Sox	715‍–‍585‍–‍12	White Sox, 343‍–‍310‍–‍6	White Sox, 372‍–‍275‍–‍6	
Minnesota Twins vs Chicago White Sox	Twins	550‍–‍486‍–‍3	Twins, 297‍–‍220‍–‍2	White Sox, 266‍–‍253‍–‍1	
Overall Regular season games	White Sox	1,201‍–‍1,135‍–‍15	Twins, 607‍–‍563‍–‍8	White Sox, 638‍–‍528‍–‍7	

== Connections between the two teams ==
=== Players to play for both teams ===
The following notable players played for both the Twins and White Sox during their careers.

Player	Pos	Twins tenure	White Sox tenure
James Baldwin	P	2003	1995–2001
Earl Battey	C	1961–1967	1955–1959
Steve Carlton	P	1987–1988	1986
Jesse Crain	P	2004–2010	2011–2013
Joe Crede	3B	2009	2000–2008
Eduardo Escobar	3B	2012–2018	2011–2012
Clark Griffith	P	1912–1914	1901–1902
Liam Hendriks	P	2011–2013	2021–2023
Jim Kaat	P	1961–1973	1973–1975
Pat Kelly	OF	1967–1968	1971–1976
Dallas Keuchel	P	2023	2020–2022
Jim Lemon	OF	1961–1963	1963
Francisco Liriano	P	2005–2012	2012
Lance Lynn	P	2018	2021–2023
Justin Morneau	1B	2003–2013	2016
A. J. Pierzynski	C	1998–2003	2005–2012
Ervin Santana	P	2015–2018	2019
Al Simmons	OF	1937–1938	1933–1935
Roy Smalley III	SS	1976–1982, 1985–1987	1984
Jim Thome	1B	2010–2011	2006–2009
Early Wynn	P	1939, 1941–1944, 1946–1948	1958–1962

== See also ==
- Bears–Vikings rivalry
- Blackhawks–Wild rivalry
