= Chris Gould =

American football player and coach (born 1985)

Los Angeles Chargers
- Title: Assistant special teams coach

Personal information
- Born: December 10, 1985 (age 40); Jesup, Georgia, U.S.
- Listed height: 6 ft 0 in (1.83 m)
- Listed weight: 215 lb (98 kg)

Career information
- Position: Placekicker
- High school: Central Mountain (Mill Hall, Pennsylvania)
- College: University of Virginia (2004–2007)
- NFL draft: 2008: undrafted

Career history

Playing
- Chicago Rush (2010–2011); Arizona Rattlers (2012)

Coaching
- Syracuse University (2012–2014) Special teams quality control coach; Denver Broncos (2015–2016) Coaching assistant; Denver Broncos (2017–2021) Assistant special teams coach; Los Angeles Chargers (2022–present) Assistant special teams coach

Awards and highlights
- Super Bowl champion (50); ArenaBowl champion (2012); First-team All-Arena (2010); AFL Kicker of the Year (2010)
- Stats at ArenaFan.com

Chris Gould (born December 10, 1985) is an American former football placekicker. He currently serves as the assistant special teams coach for the Los Angeles Chargers, and is the brother of former NFL placekicker Robbie Gould. Gould has six years of experience coaching special teams, including three seasons at the collegiate level with Syracuse University from 2012 to 2014.

== College career ==
Gould went to the University of Virginia and played for the Virginia Cavaliers football team. During his freshman year, after an injury, Gould took over punting duties, kicking 18 punts for an average of 38.6 yards. As a sophomore, he started all year at punter. In 2005, he averaged 40.0 yard per punt, the highest in Virginia history since 2001. As a junior, he moved to kicker. He went 11 for 19 on field goals, and didn't miss a single extra point. In his senior year, he went 16 for 20 on field goals, but missed 2 extra points.

== Professional career ==
Pre-draft measurables
Height	Weight
5 ft 11 1/2 in (1.82 m)	207 lb (94 kg)
Values from Pro Day

After going undrafted in the 2008 NFL draft, Gould spent two years out of football. He would go on to return to the sport, however, signing with the Chicago Rush of the Arena Football League in 2010. Gould spent two seasons with the Rush before signing with the Arizona Rattlers in 2012, where he was a member of the ArenaBowl XXV champions.

== Coaching career ==
In 2012, Gould joined the Syracuse Orange football team's staff as special teams quality control coach. Two years later, he joined the Denver Broncos to serve the same position. On February 7, 2016, Gould was part of the Broncos coaching staff that won Super Bowl 50. In the game, the Broncos defeated the Carolina Panthers by a score of 24–10. In January 2017, he was promoted to assistant special teams coach for the Broncos. On February 7, 2022, the Broncos announced that Gould would not be retained for the 2022 season.

On February 19, 2022, Gould was hired by the Los Angeles Chargers to serve as the team's assistant special teams coach for the 2022 season.

== Personal life ==
Gould's older brother, Robbie, is a former NFL placekicker and current high school football coach who kicked for the Chicago Bears, New York Giants, and the San Francisco 49ers, and had a Super Bowl appearance with the Bears.

Gould and his wife, Sam, have one child, a son named Asher.
