= Rosemarie Burian =

American sister (1936–2019)

- Born: May 18, 1936; Chicago, Illinois, U.S.
- Died: September 22, 2019 (aged 83); Illinois, U.S.
- Known for: founding the Northern Illinois Food Bank

Rosemarie Burian, OSF, D. Min., (May 18, 1936 – September 22, 2019) was a Wheaton Franciscan Sister, teacher and founder of the Bethlehem Center/Northern Illinois Food Bank.

== Career ==
She was the Pastoral Associate at St. Mark Catholic Church in Wheaton, Illinois. She went on to found Bethlehem Center, which is now called the Northern Illinois Food Bank.

Through her experience with the St. Mark's Food Pantry, she witnessed the devastating effects of both spiritual and material poverty. Too many children were going to bed and suffered from malnourished, it is hard to imagine that hunger exists in the US but it does. So serious was the problem that the US Senate set up a select committee to look into the issue.

In response to this need, Sister Rosemarie assembled a group of people to work with her on this project. They became the first board of directors: Bonnie Goodman, Cathy Truesdale, Jim Truesdale, Clevis Cabrera, Joyce Shannon, Nick Hindman, Paul Wood, Barb Williams and Willie Williams. Sister Rosemarie also met with many local leaders, Leah Krantz, from The Greater Chicago Food Depository and Bernie Kleina, the executive director of the Hope Fair Housing Center.

It was also discovered that thousands of pounds of edible food was going into landfills. The board contacted manufacturers and grocery stores to try to recover some of it. They realized a food bank could be a way of recovering and distributing this much needed food.

The name Bethlehem, meaning "House of Bread" was chosen. Sister Rosemarie was officially named the first executive director on September 28, 1982. What began as a way to help solve what was thought to be a temporary problem, has grown and as of June 2012, one in five children in Northern Illinois face hunger.

Burian left to pursue other interests in December 1986. She went on to be a chaplain then a Spiritual Director and taught classes in Meditation and Mindfulness at the Tau Center in Wheaton, IL, a spirituality ministry of the Wheaton Franciscans.

== Death and legacy ==
Burian died on September 22, 2019, at the age of 83.
