= Bald Eagle-Nittany High School =

Coordinates: 41.1075°N 77.4954°W

Location
- 200 Ben Avenue; Mill Hall, Pennsylvania, Pennsylvania 17751; USA

Information
- School type: public high school
- Opened: 1955
- Closed: 1999
- School district: Keystone Central School District
- Principal: Norman Palovcsik (1995-1999)
- Faculty: 60
- Grades: 7-12
  - Grade 7: 145 (1995-1996)
  - Grade 8: 157 (1995-1996)
  - Grade 9: 124 (1995-1996)
  - Grade 10: 141 (1995-1996)
  - Grade 11: 154 (1995-1996)
  - Grade 12: 137 (1995-1996)
- Colours: Black and White
- Mascot: Panther
- Merged with: Sugar Valley High School, Lock Haven High School
- to form: Central Mountain High School

Bald Eagle-Nittany High School was a public high school in Mill Hall, Pennsylvania. After the high school closed, the building was renovated and is now Central Mountain Middle School.

== Overview ==
Bald Eagle-Nittany High School first opened for the 1955–56 school year. Its name originates from the area where its students lived; from both valleys of Mount Nittany and Bald Eagle Mountain. The student body came from Mill Hall, Beech Creek, Pennsylvania, Lamar Township, Pennsylvania, Porter Township, Pennsylvania, and Bald Eagle Township, Pennsylvania. In 1999, after already being joined by the majority of the Sugar Valley High School students two years earlier, Bald Eagle-Nittany merged with Lock Haven High School and the three schools formed Central Mountain High School. After the merger, events such as the homecoming celebration mentioned were lost, along with the rivalry between these schools. Central Mountain students now have their own traditions.

== Athletics ==
Contributions were made through funds raised from the athletic clubs.

=== Wrestling ===
The Panther grapplers turned out a record of 450-221-11 over the school's forty-three years earning a .670 win percentage.

Coach George Custer coached seven wrestlers to twelve District 6 individual titles, three wrestlers to four state titles and also had two runners-up. Coach Custer was inducted into the Pennsylvania Wrestling Association Coaches Hall of Fame in 1973.

After Coach Custer, Coach Charles "Biff" Walizer headed the program for the next 25 years, amassing a 294-155-6 mark and ten District 6 titles, winning six straight at the end of his career. Coach Walizer coached thirty-two individual champions to fifty-two total titles at the District 6 tournament. He also coached four individual champions to eight state-level titles with six runners-up. Coach Walizer was inducted into the Pennsylvania Wrestling Association Coaches Hall of Fame in 2003.

Along with these coaches, the following associates of the Bald Eagle-Nittany wrestling program have also been inducted into the Pennsylvania Wrestling Association Coaches Hall of Fame: Terry Williams - 1991 (wrestler), Norm Polovcsik - 1999 (Editor), and Frank Eisenhower - 2004 (Wrestler).

Bald Eagle-Nittany wrestling in District 6 earned twelve tournament titles and three duals titles. The Panthers also had seventy-five champions. The program also had eight members in the District 6 hall of fame; George Custer (inducted 1990), Terry Williams (1992), Frank Eisenhower (1998), Charles "Biff" Walizer (2000), Barry Daniels (2003), Scott Bair (2006), Travis "Trap" McCormick (2006), and Biff Walizer (2006).

While wrestling at the regional level the program secured twenty-six champions, several of them earned honors as Pennsylvania Interscholastic Athletic Association state wrestling champions. Bald Eagle-Nittany wrestling state champions and runners-up are:

                   Champions                             Runners-up
    Frank Eisenhower          145 lbs. 1959     Karl Galbraith 165 lbs. 1963
    Frank Eisenhower          154 lbs. 1960     Barry Daniels  127 lbs. 1966
    Adam Waltz                138 lbs. 1962     Mark Williams  119 lbs. 1975
    Barry Daniels             133 lbs. 1967     Mark Williams  126 lbs. 1976
    Dusty Ream                138 lbs. 1974     Terry Williams 155 lbs. 1979
    Terry Williams            155 lbs. 1977     Casey Koch     119 lbs. 1987
    Terry Williams            155 lbs. 1978     Casey Koch     125 lbs. 1989
    Terry Williams            155 lbs. 1980     Shan Rippey    135 lbs. 1991
    Biff Walizer              125 lbs. 1992     Shawn Weaver   189 lbs. 1997
    Biff Walizer              125 lbs. 1993
    Scott Bair                119 lbs. 1995
    Scott Bair                125 lbs. 1996
   *Travis "Trap" McCormick   112 lbs. 1997
   +Andy Hull                 160 lbs. 1999

* Also won titles in 1995 and 1996 while wrestling for the Sugar Valley Indians at 103 lbs.
+ Last wrestling match in a Bald Eagle-Nittany singlet.

== Noted alumni ==
- Alison Bechdel (class of 1978), American cartoonist; originally best known for the long-running comic strip Dykes To Watch Out For, in 2006 she became a best-selling author with her graphic memoir Fun Home.

== See also ==
- Central Mountain High School
