= American League Central =

Division of Major League Baseball

- League: American League
- Sport: Major League Baseball
- Founded: 1994
- No. of teams: 5
- Most recent champions: Cleveland Guardians (2026; 14th title)
- Most titles: Cleveland Guardians (14)

American League Central Teams Location

The American League Central is one of Major League Baseball's six divisions. This division was formed in the realignment of 1994 by moving three teams from the American League West and two teams from the American League East. Its teams are all located in the Midwestern United States. Along with the National League East and National League Central, the AL Central is one of three divisions in the Major Leagues in which all of its members have won a World Series title. In fact, each team has captured at least two World Series championships. The Kansas City Royals were the most recent team from the division to win the World Series.

== Division membership ==
=== Current members ===
- Chicago White Sox – Founding member; formerly of the AL West
- Cleveland Guardians – Founding member; formerly of the AL East
- Detroit Tigers – Joined in 1998; formerly of the AL East
- Kansas City Royals – Founding member; formerly of the AL West
- Minnesota Twins – Founding member; formerly of the AL West

=== Former member ===
- Milwaukee Brewers – Founding member, moved into the NL Central in 1998

=== Membership timeline ===
Place cursor over year for division champ or World Series team.

AL Central Division^{[A]}
Years
94	95	96	97	98	99	00	01	02	03	04	05	06	07	08	09	10
Chicago White Sox
Cleveland Indians
Kansas City Royals
Milwaukee; Brewers^{[C]}																
Minnesota Twins
				Detroit Tigers^{[C]}												
AL Central Division^{[A]}
Years
11	12	13	14	15	16	17	18	19	20	21	22	23	24	25	26	27
Chicago White Sox
Cleveland Indians												Cleveland Guardians^{[B]}				
Kansas City Royals
Minnesota Twins
Detroit Tigers
Team not in division Division won World Series Division won AL Championship

^{A} The Chicago White Sox, Kansas City Royals, and Minnesota Twins came from the AL West, and the Cleveland Indians and Milwaukee Brewers from the AL East.
^{B} The Cleveland Guardians were known as the Cleveland Indians until November 2021.
^{C} Due to expansion in 1998 and the placement of the new Tampa Bay Devil Rays in the AL East, the Tigers moved to the Central. To give each league an even number of teams, the Brewers moved to the NL Central.

== Champions by year ==
The Chicago White Sox and Kansas City Royals are the only teams from the AL Central division to have won the World Series since the league realignment in 1994.

- Team names link to the season in which each team played

Year	Winner	Record	%	Playoff Results
1994§	No playoffs due to 1994–95 Major League Baseball strike			
1995	Cleveland Indians (1)	100–44	.694	Won ALDS (Red Sox) 3–0; Won ALCS (Mariners) 4–2; Lost World Series (Braves) 4–2
1996	Cleveland Indians (2)	99–62	.615	Lost ALDS (Orioles) 3–1
1997	Cleveland Indians (3)	86–75	.534	Won ALDS (Yankees) 3–2; Won ALCS (Orioles) 4–2; Lost World Series (Marlins) 4–3
1998	Cleveland Indians (4)	89–73	.549	Won ALDS (Red Sox) 3–1; Lost ALCS (Yankees) 4–2
1999	Cleveland Indians (5)	97–65	.599	Lost ALDS (Red Sox) 3–2
2000	Chicago White Sox (1)	95–67	.586	Lost ALDS (Mariners) 3–0
2001	Cleveland Indians (6)	91–71	.562	Lost ALDS (Mariners) 3–2
2002	Minnesota Twins (1)	94–67	.584	Won ALDS (Athletics) 3–2; Lost ALCS (Angels) 4–1
2003	Minnesota Twins (2)	90–72	.556	Lost ALDS (Yankees) 3–1
2004	Minnesota Twins (3)	92–70	.568	Lost ALDS (Yankees) 3–1
2005	Chicago White Sox (2)	99–63	.611	Won ALDS (Red Sox) 3–0; Won ALCS (Angels) 4–1; Won World Series (Astros) 4–0
2006	Minnesota Twins (4)	96–66	.593	Lost ALDS (Athletics) 3–0
2007	Cleveland Indians (7)	96–66	.593	Won ALDS (Yankees) 3–1; Lost ALCS (Red Sox) 4–3
2008	Chicago White Sox (3)**	89–74	.546	Lost ALDS (Rays) 3–1
2009	Minnesota Twins (5)#	87–76	.534	Lost ALDS (Yankees) 3–0
2010	Minnesota Twins (6)	94–68	.580	Lost ALDS (Yankees) 3–0
2011	Detroit Tigers (1)	95–67	.586	Won ALDS (Yankees) 3–2; Lost ALCS (Rangers) 4–2
2012	Detroit Tigers (2)	88–74	.543	Won ALDS (Athletics) 3–2; Won ALCS (Yankees) 4–0; Lost World Series (Giants) 4–0
2013	Detroit Tigers (3)	93–69	.574	Won ALDS (Athletics) 3–2; Lost ALCS (Red Sox) 4–2
2014	Detroit Tigers (4)	90–72	.556	Lost ALDS (Orioles) 3–0
2015	Kansas City Royals (1)	95–67	.586	Won ALDS (Astros) 3–2; Won ALCS (Blue Jays) 4–2; Won World Series (Mets) 4–1
2016	Cleveland Indians (8)	94–67	.584	Won ALDS (Red Sox) 3–0; Won ALCS (Blue Jays) 4–1; Lost World Series (Cubs) 4–3
2017	Cleveland Indians (9)	102–60	.630	Lost ALDS (Yankees) 3–2
2018	Cleveland Indians (10)	91–71	.562	Lost ALDS (Astros) 3–0
2019	Minnesota Twins (7)	101–61	.623	Lost ALDS (Yankees) 3–0
2020***	Minnesota Twins (8)	36–24	.600	Lost ALWC (Astros) 2–0
2021	Chicago White Sox (4)	93–69	.574	Lost ALDS (Astros) 3–1
2022	Cleveland Guardians (11)	92–70	.568	Won ALWC (Rays) 2–0; Lost ALDS (Yankees) 3–2
2023	Minnesota Twins (9)	87–75	.537	Won ALWC (Blue Jays) 2–0; Lost ALDS (Astros) 3–1
2024	Cleveland Guardians (12)	92–69	.571	Won ALDS (Tigers) 3–2; Lost ALCS (Yankees) 4–1
2025	Cleveland Guardians (13)	88–74	.543	Lost ALWC (Tigers) 2–1
2026	Cleveland Guardians (14)	85–77	.525	Won ALDS (White Sox) 3–2; Lost ALCS (Rays) 4–2

* Due to the 1994 Major League Baseball strike starting August 12, no winner was determined. The Chicago White Sox were leading at the time that the strike began.

** In 2008, the Minnesota Twins and Chicago White Sox finished the season with the identical records. The White Sox won the one-game playoff 1–0.

# In 2009, the Minnesota Twins and Detroit Tigers finished the season with identical records. The Twins won the one-game playoff 6–5 in 12 innings.

*** Due to the COVID-19 pandemic, the season was shortened to 60 games. By virtue of the eight-team postseason format used for that season, division runner-up Cleveland also qualified for the playoffs. The Indians were tied with the Chicago White Sox but won the runner-up honors with a better head-to-head record (Indians won the season series 8–2 over the White Sox).

== Other postseason teams ==
In 1994, the Cleveland Indians were sitting atop the wild-card standings and would have qualified for the postseason as the AL's first wild card but on August 12 of that year, the season came to an early end due to a players strike, cancelling the remainder of the regular season and postseason. The 2006 Detroit Tigers were the first team from the Central to qualify as the wild card. MLB revamped the postseason starting in 2012, creating a new single-game playoff where two wildcards competed against each other while the division winners each received a bye. The winner of the American League wild card game moved on to face the top-seeded team of the AL in the American League Division Series. In 2013, the Indians became the first team from the AL Central to qualify as a wild card under the new postseason format. In 2014, the Kansas City Royals ended a 29-year postseason drought returning to the playoffs for the first time since winning the World Series in 1985.

In 2020 only, eight teams, including the three division winners, played in a best-of-three Wild Card Series, with the winners advancing to the Division Series. Starting in 2022, the Wild Card field was increased to three teams, and along with the lowest-ranked division winner, qualified for the best-of-three Wild Card Series to determine the remaining two slots in the Division Series.

Year	Winner	Record	%	GB	Playoff Results
2006	Detroit Tigers	95–67	.586	1	Won ALDS (Yankees) 3–1; Won ALCS (Athletics) 4–0; Lost World Series (Cardinals) 4–1
2013	Cleveland Indians	92–70	.568	1	Lost ALWC (Rays)
2014	Kansas City Royals	89–73	.549	1	Won ALWC (Athletics); Won ALDS (Angels) 3–0; Won ALCS (Orioles) 4–0; Lost World Series (Giants) 4–3
2017	Minnesota Twins	85–77	.525	17	Lost ALWC (Yankees)
2020†	Cleveland Indians	35–25	.583	1	Lost ALWC (Yankees) 2–0
2020†	Chicago White Sox	35–25	.583	1	Lost ALWC (Athletics) 2–1
2024	Kansas City Royals**	86–76	.531	6 1/2	Won ALWC (Orioles) 2–0; Lost ALDS (Yankees) 3–1
2024	Detroit Tigers**	86–76	.531	6 1/2	Won ALWC (Astros) 2–0; Lost ALDS (Guardians) 3–2
2025	Detroit Tigers***	87–75	.537	1	Won ALWC (Guardians) 2–1; Lost ALDS (Mariners) 3–2
2026	Chicago White Sox**	84–78	.519	1	Won ALWC (Astros) 2–0; Lost ALDS (Guardians) 3–2

† – Due to the COVID-19 pandemic, the season was shortened to 60 games. The White Sox were tied with the Cleveland Indians but lost the runner-up honors due to an inferior head-to-head record (White Sox lost the season series 2–8 to the Indians).

(**) The Tigers and Royals were tied for the 2nd Wild Card spot, but the Royals earned the tiebreaker by virtue of winning the regular season series 7–6.

(***) Finished with the same record as the Houston Astros, but won the third wild-card spot due to the Tigers winning the season series 4–2.

== Season results ==
^{(#)}	Denotes team that won the World Series
^{(#)}	Denotes team that won the American League pennant, but lost World Series
^{(#)}	Denotes team that qualified for the MLB postseason

Season	Team (record)				
Season	1st	2nd	3rd	4th	5th
1994: The American League Central was formed with five members. The Cleveland Indians and Milwaukee Brewers joined from the American League East. The Chicago White Sox, Kansas City Royals and Minnesota Twins joined from the American League West. Due to the player's strike, the remainder of the season was cancelled on August 12. The postseason and World Series was also cancelled.
1994	Chicago White Sox (67–46)	Cleveland (66–47)	Kansas City (64–51)	Minnesota (53–60)	Milwaukee (53–62)
1995	^{(1)} Cleveland (100–44)	Kansas City (70–74)	Chicago White Sox (68–76)	Milwaukee (65–79)	Minnesota (56–88)
1996	^{(1)} Cleveland (99–62)	Chicago White Sox (85–77)	Milwaukee (80–82)	Minnesota (78–84)	Kansas City (75–86)
1997	^{(3)} Cleveland (86–75)	Chicago White Sox (80–81)	Milwaukee (78–83)	Minnesota (68–94)	Kansas City (67–94)
1998: The Detroit Tigers joined from the American League East. The Milwaukee Brewers left to join the National League Central.
1998	^{(2)} Cleveland (89–73)	Chicago White Sox (80–82)	Kansas City (72–89)	Minnesota (70–92)	Detroit (65–97)
1999	^{(1)} Cleveland (97–65)	Chicago White Sox (75–86)	Detroit (69–92)	Kansas City (64–97)	Minnesota (63–97)
2000	^{(1)} Chicago White Sox (95–67)	Cleveland (90–72)	Detroit (79–83)	Kansas City (77–85)	Minnesota (69–93)
2001	^{(3)} Cleveland (91–71)	Minnesota (85–77)	Chicago White Sox (83–79)	Detroit (66–96)	Kansas City (65–97)
2002	^{(3)} Minnesota (94–67)	Chicago White Sox (81–81)	Cleveland (74–88)	Kansas City (62–100)	Detroit (55–106)
2003	^{(3)} Minnesota (90–72)	Chicago White Sox (86–76)	Kansas City (83–79)	Cleveland (68–94)	Detroit (43–119)
2004	^{(3)} Minnesota^{[a]} (92–70)	Chicago White Sox (83–79)	Cleveland (80–82)	Detroit (72–90)	Kansas City (58–104)
2005	^{(1)} Chicago White Sox (99–63)	Cleveland (93–69)	Minnesota (83–79)	Detroit (71–91)	Kansas City (56–106)
2006	^{(2)} Minnesota (96–66)	^{(4)} Detroit (95–67)	Chicago White Sox (90–72)	Cleveland (78–84)	Kansas City (62–100)
2007	^{(2)} Cleveland^{[b]} (96–66)	Detroit (88–74)	Minnesota (79–83)	Chicago White Sox (72–90)	Kansas City (69–93)
2008	^{(3)} Chicago White Sox^{[c]} (89–74)	Minnesota (88–75)	Cleveland (81–81)	Kansas City (75–87)	Detroit (74–88)
2009	^{(3)} Minnesota^{[d]} (87–76)	Detroit (86–77)	Chicago White Sox (79–83)	Cleveland (65–97)	Kansas City (65–97)
2010	^{(2)} Minnesota (94–68)	Chicago White Sox (88–74)	Detroit (81–81)	Cleveland (69–93)	Kansas City (67–95)
2011	^{(3)} Detroit (95–67)	Cleveland (80–82)	Chicago White Sox (79–83)	Kansas City (71–91)	Minnesota (63–99)
2012	^{(3)} Detroit (88–74)	Chicago White Sox (85–77)	Kansas City (72–90)	Cleveland (68–94)	Minnesota (66–96)
2013	^{(3)} Detroit (93–69)	^{(4)} Cleveland (92–70)	Kansas City (86–76)	Minnesota (66–96)	Chicago White Sox (63–99)
2014	^{(3)} Detroit (90–72)	^{(4)} Kansas City (89–73)	Cleveland (85–77)	Chicago White Sox (73–89)	Minnesota (70–92)
2015	^{(1)} Kansas City (95–67)	Minnesota (83–79)	Cleveland (81–80)	Chicago White Sox (76–86)	Detroit (74–87)
2016	^{(2)} Cleveland (94–67)	Detroit (86–75)	Kansas City (81–81)	Chicago White Sox (78–84)	Minnesota (59–103)
2017	^{(1)} Cleveland (102–60)	^{(5)} Minnesota (85–77)	Kansas City (80–82)	Chicago White Sox (67–95)	Detroit (64–98)
2018	^{(3)} Cleveland (91–71)	Minnesota (78–84)	Detroit (64–98)	Chicago White Sox (62–100)	Kansas City (58–104)
2019	^{(3)} Minnesota (101–61)	Cleveland (93–69)	Chicago White Sox (72–89)	Kansas City (59–103)	Detroit (47–114)
2020: Due to the COVID-19 pandemic, the season was shortened to 60 games. The postseason field was expanded to eight teams and the wild-card round became a best-of-three series.
2020	^{(3)} Minnesota (36–24)	^{(4)} Cleveland^{[e]} (35–25)	^{(7)} Chicago White Sox (35–25)	Kansas City (26–34)	Detroit (23–35)
2021	^{(3)} Chicago White Sox (93–69)	Cleveland (80–82)	Detroit (77–85)	Kansas City (74–88)	Minnesota (73–89)
2022: The Cleveland Indians were rebranded as the Cleveland Guardians following the name and logo controversy surrounding the brand.
2022	^{(3)} Cleveland (92–70)	Chicago White Sox (81–81)	Minnesota (78–84)	Detroit (66–96)	Kansas City (65–97)
2023	^{(3)} Minnesota (87–75)	Detroit (78–84)	Cleveland (76–86)	Chicago White Sox (61–101)	Kansas City (56–106)
2024	^{(2)} Cleveland (92–69)	^{(5)} Kansas City^{[f]} (86–76)	^{(6)} Detroit^{[f]} (86–76)	Minnesota (82–80)	Chicago White Sox (41–121)
2025	^{(3)} Cleveland (88–74)	^{(6)} Detroit^{[g]} (87–75)	Kansas City (82–80)	Minnesota (70–92)	Chicago White Sox (60–102)
2026	^{(2)} Cleveland (85–77)	^{(6)} Chicago White Sox (84–78)	Minnesota (77–85)	Detroit (76–86)	Kansas City (69–93)

Notes and tiebreakers

- ^{a} Minnesota and Anaheim of the American League West were tied for the second and third seed, but the Twins were relegated to the third seed by losing the season series 5–4.
- ^{b} Cleveland and Boston of the American League East were tied for the first and second seed, but the Indians were relegated to the second seed by losing the season series 5–2.
- ^{c} Chicago and Minnesota were tied for the division championship and played in a tie-breaker game. The White Sox won 1–0 to claim the division crown.
- ^{d} Minnesota and Detroit were tied for the division championship and played in a tie-breaker game. The Twins won 6–5 in 12 innings to claim the division crown.
- ^{e} Cleveland and Chicago were tied for the fourth and seventh seed, but the Indians claimed the fourth seed by winning the season series 8–2.
- ^{f} Kansas City and Detroit were tied for the fifth seed and the second Wild Card berth, but the Royals claimed the second Wild Card spot by winning the season series 7–6.
- ^{g} Detroit and Houston of the American League West were tied for the third Wild Card berth, but the Tigers clinched the final postseason spot by winning the season series 4–2.

== AL Central statistics ==
Team	Division championships			Postseason records (Note: Reflects postseason record of each team only during the team's time as a member of the AL Central)				
Team	Number	Year(s)	Most recent	Wild Card (Note: Number of times qualifying as a wild card team)	ALWC	ALDS	ALCS	World Series
Current members
Cleveland Guardians (Note: Formerly known as Cleveland Indians)	14	1995–1999, 2001, 2007, 2016–2018, 2022, 2024–2026	2026	2	1–3	7–6	3–3	0–3
Minnesota Twins	9	2002–2004, 2006, 2009*, 2010, 2019–2020, 2023	2023	1	1–2	1–7	0–1	0–0
Chicago White Sox	4	2000, 2005, 2008*, 2021	2021	1	1–1	1–3	1–0	1–0
Detroit Tigers	4	2011–2014	2014	3	1–0	4–3	2–2	0–2
Kansas City Royals	1	2015	2015	2	2–0	2–1	2–0	1–1
Former members
Milwaukee Brewers†	0	—	—	—	—	0–0	0–0	0–0
Total	30	1995–present	2024	8	6‍–‍6	14‍–‍20	8‍–‍6	2‍–‍6

* – Won division via tiebreaker
† – Brewers moved to the National League Central beginning in 1998

Totals updated through conclusion of the 2024 postseason.

== Rivalries ==
- Twins–White Sox rivalry

== See also ==
- American League East
- American League West
- National League East
- National League Central
- National League West
