= Central Mountain High School =

Coordinates: 41.115°N 77.507°W

Location
- 64 Keystone Central Drive; Mill Hall, Clinton, Pennsylvania 17751; United States

Information
- School type: Public, Secondary
- Established: 1999
- School district: Keystone Central School District
- Principal: Nick Verelli
- Teaching staff: 63.57 (FTE)
- Grades: 9-12
- Enrollment: 1,081 (2023–2024)
- Student to teacher ratio: 17.00
- Colors: Royal blue, White
- Mascot: Wildcat
- Website: https://cmhs.kcsd.us/

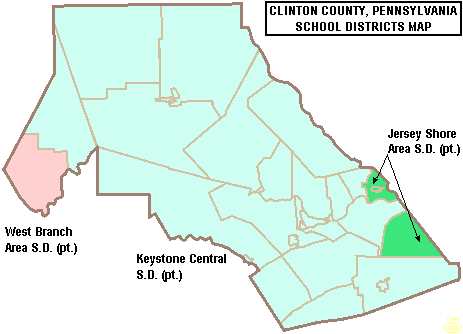
Clinton County School Districts

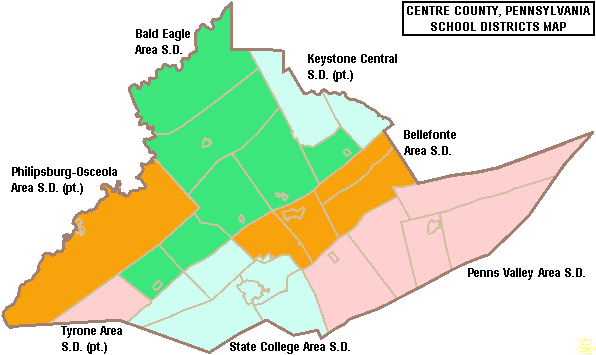
Centre County School Districts

Central Mountain High School is a public high school located at 64 Keystone Central Drive, Mill Hall, Clinton County, Pennsylvania, United States. In the 2022–2023 school year, enrollment was reported as 1,127 pupils in 9th through 12th grades. Central Mountain High School is one of two high schools in the Keystone Central School District. Keystone Central is the geographically largest school district in Pennsylvania.

Central Mountain's colors are royal blue, and white, and their mascot is the Wildcat. The school is the combination of three other high schools, Lock Haven High School, Bald Eagle-Nittany High School, and Sugar Valley High School, which were heavy rivals in the past. Construction of the building began in 1997 and the school was opened for the 1999-2000 school year. It was designed by the Quad 3 construction group.

== Sports ==
Central Mountain sports are cross country, volleyball, football, boys and girls basketball, boys and girls soccer, boys and girls tennis, wrestling, track and field, golf, swimming, softball, and baseball. The school participates in PIAA. The school qualifies as an AAAA school but some sports play in AAA competition. They participate in the Pennsylvania Heartland Athletic Conference. Central Mountain is the high school that originally brought to light the sexual predation of minors by former Penn State Defensive Coordinator Jerry Sandusky.

== Notable alumni ==
- Chris Gould, Los Angeles Chargers assistant special teams coach
- Robbie Gould, Pro Bowl place kicker for the San Francisco 49ers
