= Robbie Gould =

American football player (born 1982)

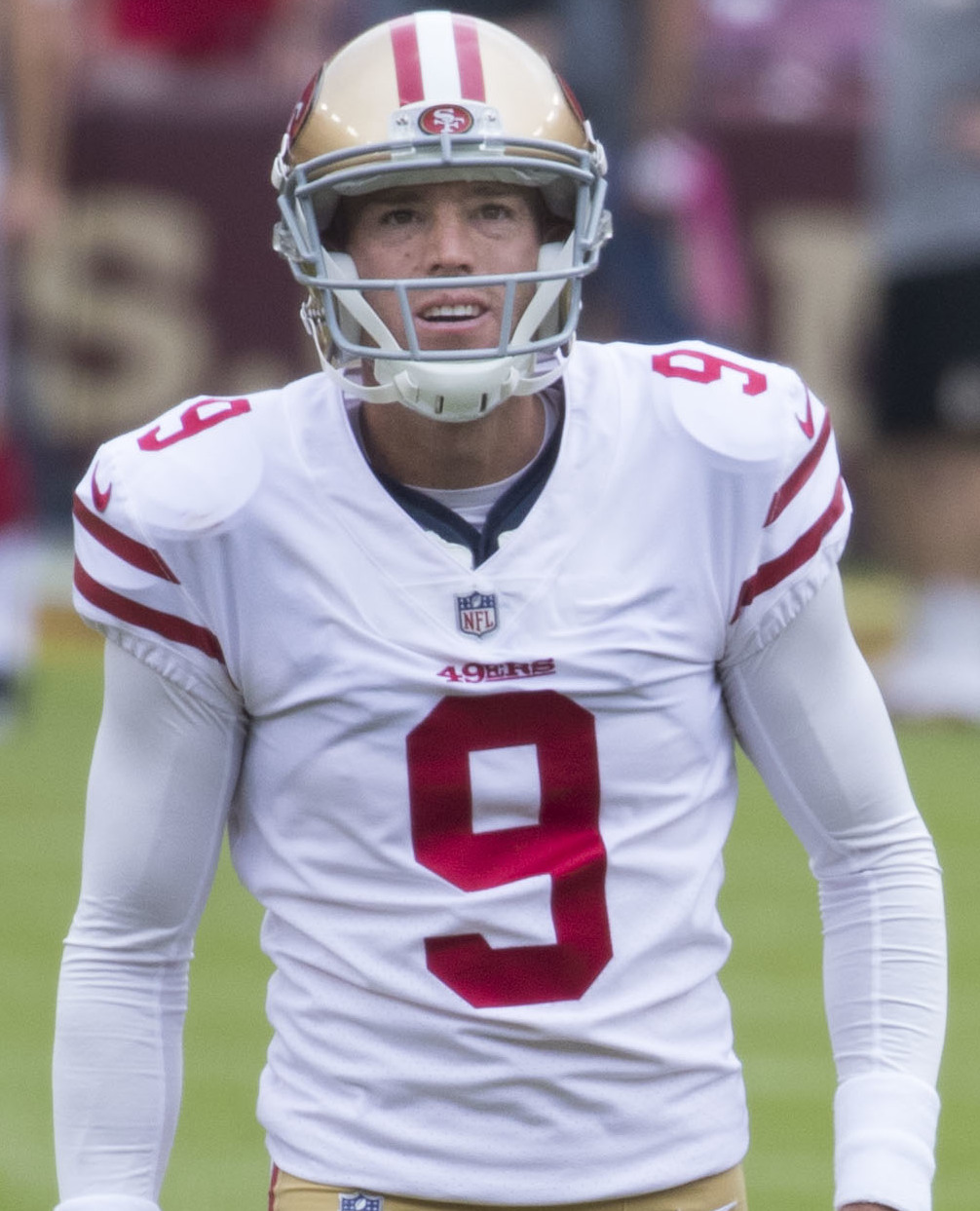
- Gould with the San Francisco 49ers in 2017

No. 9, 5
- Position: Placekicker

Personal information
- Born: December 6, 1982 (age 43); Jersey Shore, Pennsylvania, U.S.
- Listed height: 6 ft 0 in (1.83 m)
- Listed weight: 190 lb (86 kg)

Career information
- High school: Central Mountain (Mill Hall, Pennsylvania)
- College: Penn State (2001–2004)
- NFL draft: 2005: undrafted

Career history

Playing
- New England Patriots (2005)*; Baltimore Ravens (2005)*; Chicago Bears (2005–2015); New York Giants (2016); San Francisco 49ers (2017–2022)
- * Offseason or practice squad member only

Coaching
- Rolling Meadows HS (IL) (2024) Head coach; St. Viator (IL) (2025–2026) Head coach

Awards and highlights
- First-team All-Pro (2006); Pro Bowl (2006); 100 greatest Bears of All-Time

Career NFL statistics
- Field goals made: 447
- Field goal attempts: 517
- Field goal percentage: 86.5%
- Longest field goal: 58
- Touchbacks: 302
- Stats at Pro Football Reference

Robert Paul Gould III (/ˈɡoʊld/ GOLD; born December 6, 1982) is an American former professional football player who was a placekicker for 18 seasons in the National Football League (NFL) with the Chicago Bears, New York Giants and San Francisco 49ers. He played college football for the Penn State Nittany Lions and was signed by the New England Patriots as an undrafted free agent in 2005. Gould played with the Bears from 2005 to 2015, earning first-team All-Pro and Pro Bowl honors in 2006, and became the franchise's all-time leading scorer.

Gould ranks as the ninth-most accurate placekicker in NFL history and never missed a field goal or extra point in the postseason, converting all 29 field goal attempts and all 39 extra point attempts. He finished his career as the 10th all-time leading scorer in NFL history.

== Early life ==
Gould was born to Cheryl and Robert Gould in Jersey Shore, Pennsylvania. His father was a three-time All-American soccer player who led Lock Haven University to a Division II national championship in 1980, and was drafted by the St. Louis Steamers in the early 1980s. Gould attended Central Mountain High School in Mill Hall, Pennsylvania, where he won letters in football, soccer, basketball, and track.

== College career ==
Gould was originally interested in pursuing professional soccer while still in high school. Choosing football instead, he asked his principal to send a letter of recommendation to Penn State University head football coach Joe Paterno, who invited him to try out as a freshman walk-on. Gould enrolled at Penn State, where he played for the Nittany Lions football team and earned a degree in business management. In four years with the Nittany Lions, he converted 115 of 121 extra point attempts and 39 of 61 field goal attempts.

== Professional career ==
=== Early career ===
Pre-draft measurables
Height	Weight
6 ft 1 in (1.85 m)	181 lb (82 kg)
Values from Pro Day

After going undrafted in the 2005 NFL draft, Gould was signed as a free agent by the defending Super Bowl champion New England Patriots prior to the 2005 NFL preseason — even though they already had established Super Bowl-winning placekicker Adam Vinatieri. Following his preseason release from the Patriots, Gould signed with the Baltimore Ravens only to be waived three weeks later. He then found construction work with M&R Contracting in Mill Hall, Pennsylvania.

=== Chicago Bears ===
==== 2005 season ====
The Chicago Bears signed Gould on October 8, 2005, following the Week 3 injury of their starting kicker, Doug Brien. Gould kicked his first NFL field goal the next week in a 20–10 road loss against the Cleveland Browns, and his first game-winner in Week 9 against the New Orleans Saints. He earned NFC Special Teams Player of the Week for his game against the Saints. In his rookie season, Gould appeared in 13 games and converted 19 of 20 extra point attempts and 21 of 27 field goal attempts.

==== 2006 season ====
Gould kicked 26 consecutive field goals in 2006, breaking former Bears' kicker Kevin Butler's record of most consecutive field goals and winning NFC Special Teams Player of the Week for Week 16 against the Detroit Lions and NFC Special Teams Player of the Month for October 2006 in the process. He was also named to the 2006 All-Pro team by the Associated Press. In addition, NFL fans across the nation voted Gould the NFC's kicker for the 2007 Pro Bowl. His 25-yard overtime field goal against the Tampa Bay Buccaneers gave the Bears home-field advantage throughout the ensuing playoffs. On January 14, 2007, his 49-yard field goal in overtime against the Seattle Seahawks gave the Bears their first divisional playoff win since 1988, advancing them to the NFC Championship, in which they defeated the New Orleans Saints by a score of 39–14. The Bears later lost Super Bowl XLI to the Indianapolis Colts by a score of 29–17. He earned First Team All-Pro honors.

==== 2007 season ====
In the 2007 season, Gould appeared in all 16 games and converted all 33 extra point attempts and 31 of 36 field goal attempts.

==== 2008 season ====
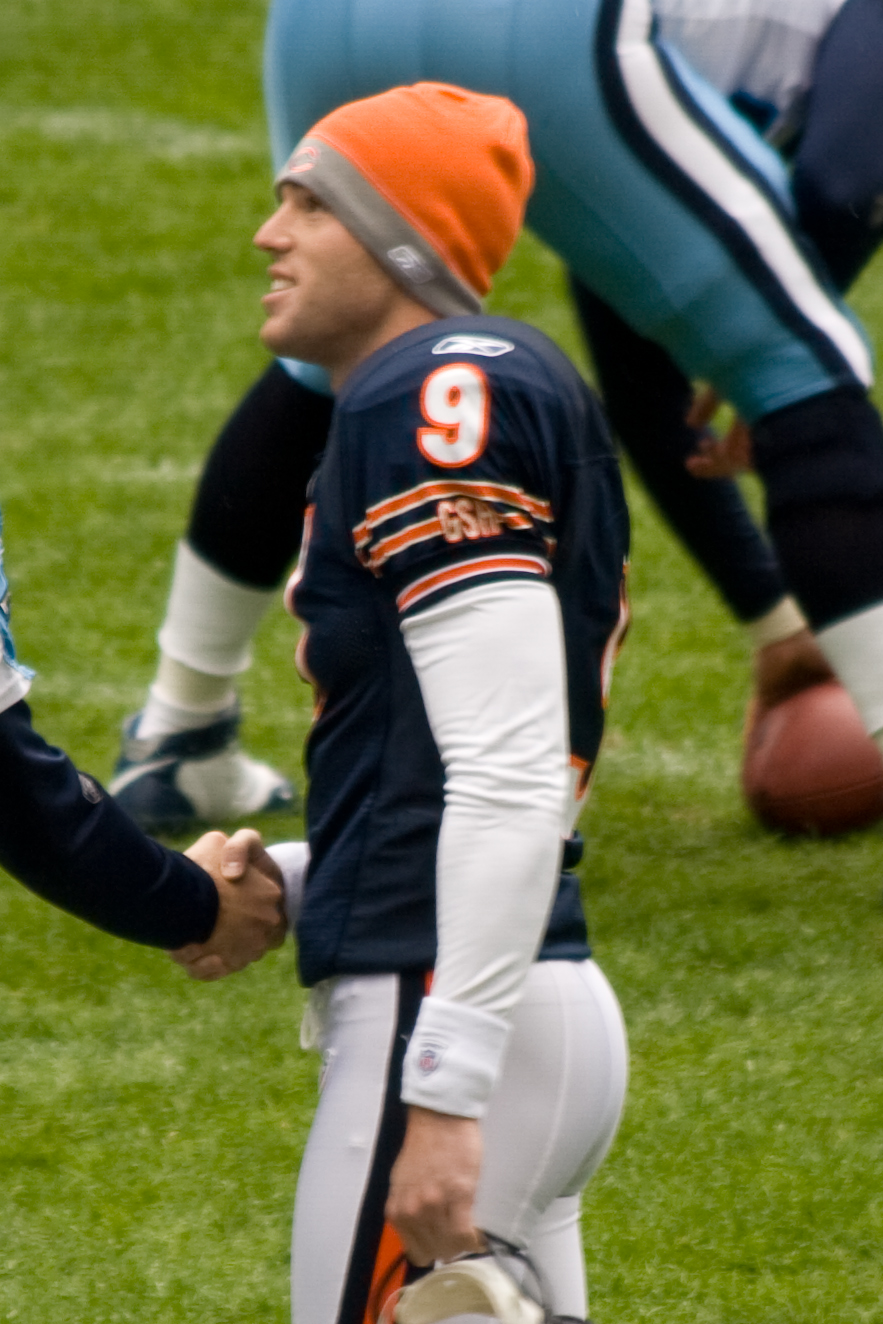
Gould in 2008

In 2008, Gould was named NFC Special Teams Player of the Month for December 2008 after making all eight of his field-goal attempts including two more overtime game-winners, becoming the fourth kicker of overtime game-winning field goals in back-to-back games in NFL history. He converted 26 of 29 field-goal attempts (89.7 percent) in 2008, breaking his own franchise single-season record for accuracy. Going into the 2009 season, he had converted 84.8 percent of his career field goal attempts.

On May 12, 2008, he signed a five-year extension with the Bears that would keep him on the team through the 2013 season. The contract, reportedly worth $15.5 million, included a $4.25 million signing bonus and made Gould the NFL's highest-paid kicker.

==== 2009 season ====
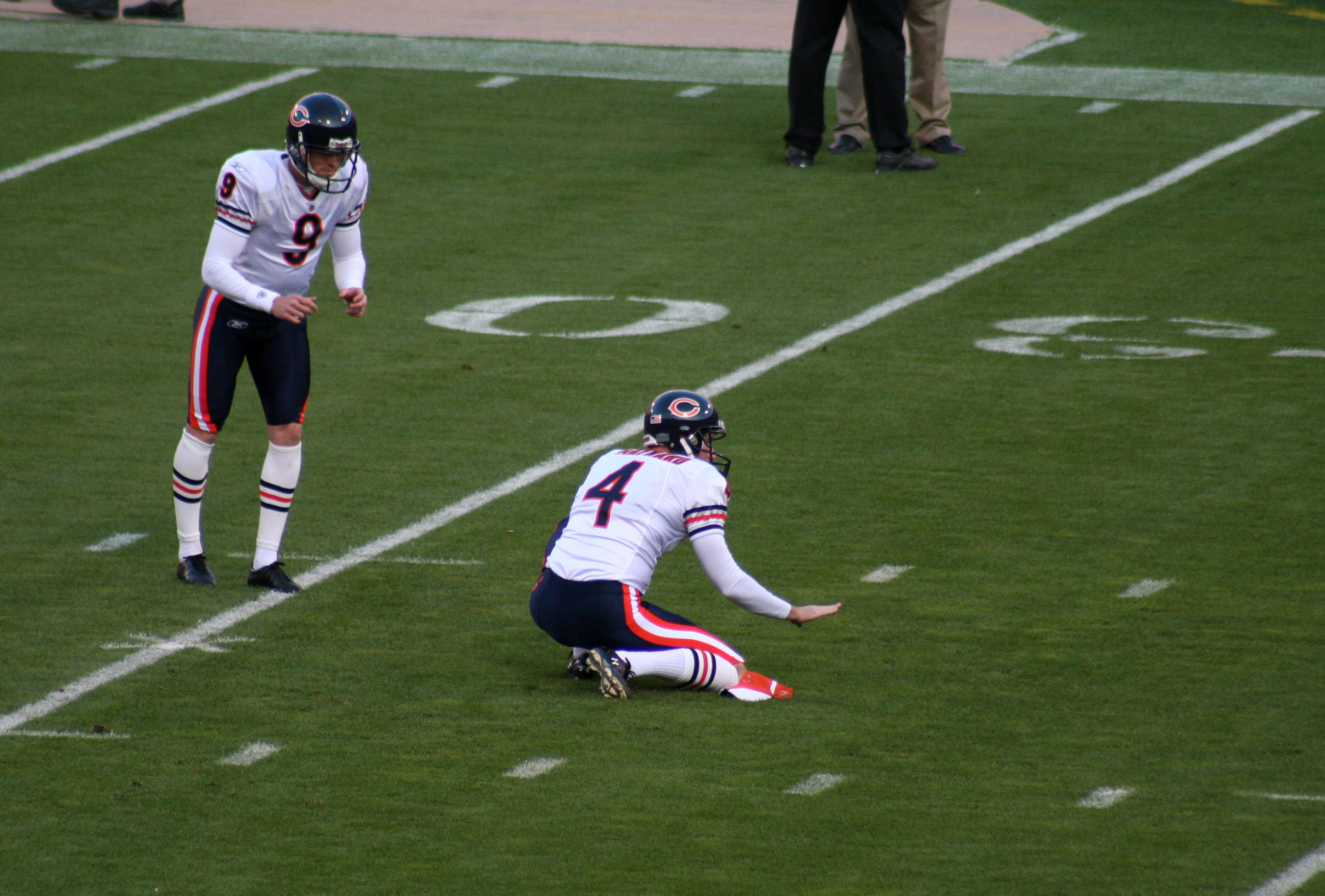
Gould preparing to kick in 2009 against the San Francisco 49ers

In the 2009 season, Gould appeared in all 16 games and converted all 33 extra point attempts and 24 of 28 field goal attempts.

==== 2010 season ====
In the 2010 season, Gould appeared in all 16 games and converted all 35 extra point attempts and 25 of 30 field goal attempts.

==== 2011 season ====
In the 2011 season, Gould appeared in all 16 games and converted all 37 extra point attempts and 28 of 32 field goal attempts.

==== 2012 season ====
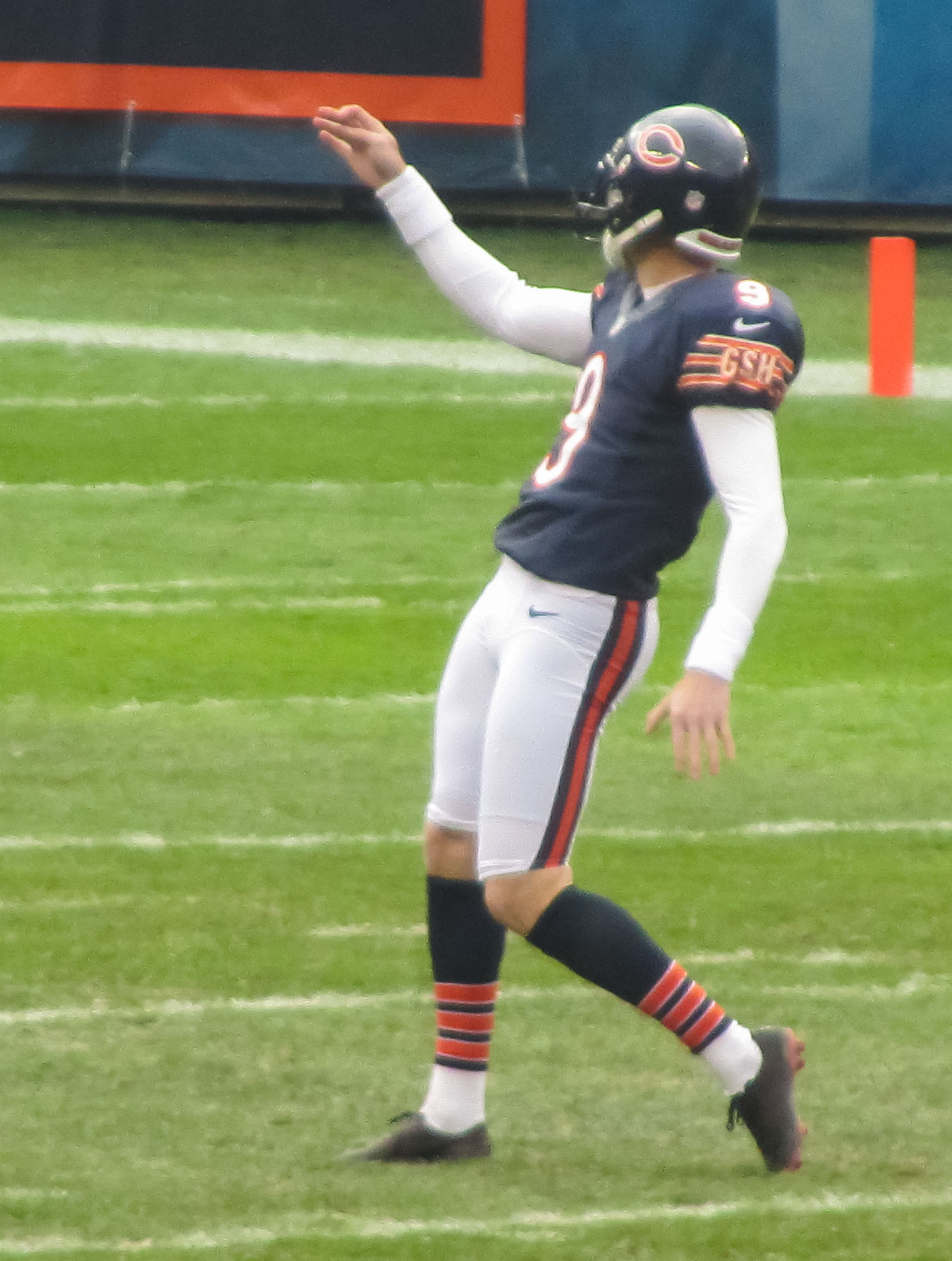
Gould warming up against the Seattle Seahawks, 2012

In the 2012 season, Gould made his tenth career game-winning field goal against the Carolina Panthers in Week 8, and his ten consecutive field goals from 50 yards or more without a miss was second behind Tony Zendejas. Before pregame warm-ups during Week 14 against the Minnesota Vikings, Gould strained his left calf. After limited play during the game, he was placed on injured reserve for the rest of the year. On the year, he converted all 33 extra point attempts and 21 of 25 field goal attempts in 13 games.

==== 2013 season ====
In the 2013 regular season opener against the Cincinnati Bengals, Gould made a 58-yard field goal late in the first half, setting the Bears record for longest field goal and tying him with Zendejas for most consecutive 50+-yard field goals without a miss with eleven. During Week 13 against the Minnesota Vikings, Gould missed a career-high two field goals, tying his two missed kicks in 2006 against the St. Louis Rams; the two field goals were a 66-yarder, which would have broken the NFL record for longest field goal converted, and a 47-yarder in overtime. On December 27, Gould signed a four-year extension with the Bears worth $15 million, with $9 million guaranteed, the most by a kicker. Gould ended the 2013 season converting 26 of 29 field goal attempts and 45 of 46 extra points for a total of 123 points scored. Gould became the second player in Bears history to record 1,000 points, with 1,025, 91 points behind Kevin Butler. Gould's seven seasons with at least 100 points is a Chicago Bears record.

==== 2014 season ====
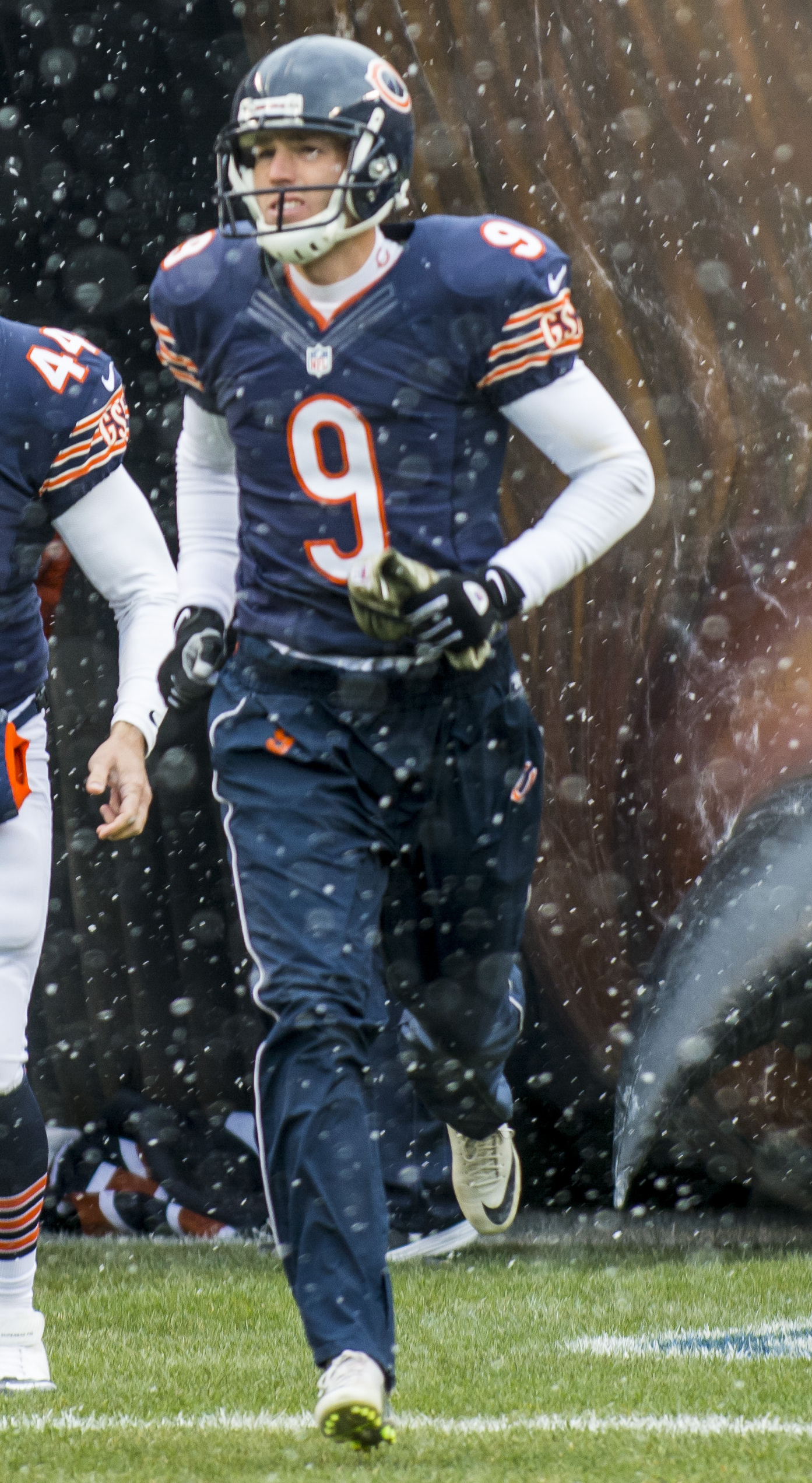
Gould heading out of the tunnel, 2014

In the 2014 season, Gould appeared in 12 games and converted 28 of 29 extra point attempts and nine of 12 field goal attempts. He suffered a quad injury which cost him some time.

==== 2015 season ====
In Week 4 of the 2015 season, Gould converted a go-ahead 49-yard field goal to put the Bears up 22–20 over the Oakland Raiders. Gould earned NFC Special Teams Player of the Week for the first time since the 2006 season. In Week 5 against the Kansas City Chiefs, Gould became the Bears' all-time scoring leader with 1,118 points, overtaking Kevin Butler's record by two, with a 30-yard field goal in the third quarter. At the end of the season, Gould had made 33 field goals, the most ever for a Bears kicker in a single season and the second-most in the NFL. He concluded the year having converted 33 of 39 field goals for an 84.6 percentage, 19th in the league, and leading the Bears in scoring with 127 points. However, he struggled during the later portion of the season, missing two field goals against the San Francisco 49ers and a potential game-tying kick against the Washington Redskins, with a combined two of five field goals converted in those two games.

In 2016, Gould was awarded the Ed Block Courage Award. He was released by the Bears in a cost-saving move on September 4, 2016. The change occurred just one week before their first regular season game, and after a preseason where he had made 5 of 6 field goal attempts but missed two extra-point attempts, one of which was the result of a bad snap. Gould, the longest-tenured player for the Bears, ended his career in Chicago as the team's all-time leader in career points (1,207), field goals made (276), and career field goals of at least 50 yards (23).

=== New York Giants ===
In the wake of Josh Brown's domestic abuse investigation, Gould was signed by the New York Giants on October 20, 2016. Gould took the number 5 because Giants' punter Brad Wing already had his preferred 9. He kicked his first field goal for the Giants against the Los Angeles Rams On October 23. In the November 20 game against the Chicago Bears, Gould kicked a 46-yard field goal but missed two extra point attempts against his former team. He kicked four field goals against the Philadelphia Eagles on December 22. Gould was 10 for 10 on field goals for the Giants.

=== San Francisco 49ers ===
==== 2017 season ====
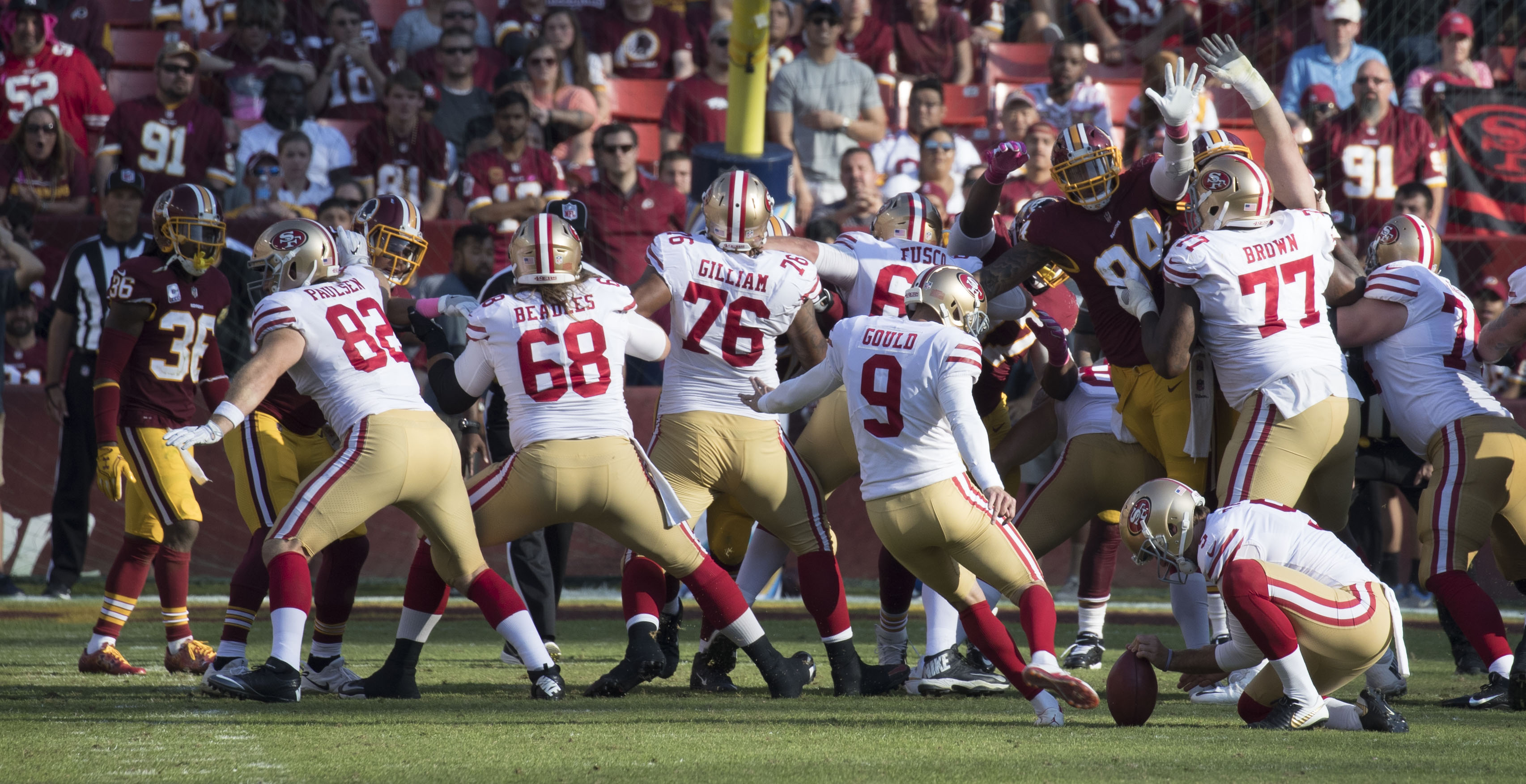
Gould kicking a field goal in a game against the Redskins

On March 9, 2017, Gould signed a two-year contract with the San Francisco 49ers.

In his 49ers debut, Gould kicked a 44-yard field goal against the Carolina Panthers during a 23–3 loss. Three weeks later, he kicked five field goals against the Arizona Cardinals. During a Week 13 road game against his former team, the Chicago Bears, Gould kicked five field goals to lift the 49ers to a narrow 15–14 road victory. He was named NFC Special Teams Player of the Week for his performance. In the next game, Gould kicked four field goals against the Houston Texans as the 49ers won on the road by a score of 26–16. The following week, he booted six field goals, including a 45-yard game winner as time expired in a narrow 25–23 victory over the Tennessee Titans, earning him NFC Special Teams Player of the Week. The last time a 49ers kicker made six field goals in a game was in 1996 by Jeff Wilkins. In the month of December, Gould earned NFC Special Teams Player of the Month honors.

Gould finished the season third in scoring with 145 points from 28 extra points and 39 field goals converted. He was voted as an alternate to the 2018 Pro Bowl.

==== 2018 season ====
During Week 2, Gould kicked three field goals, including a 36-yard game-winner, in a 30–27 victory over the Detroit Lions, earning him NFC Special Teams Player of the Week honors. During Week 15, Gould converted all four field-goal attempts, including a 36-yard game-winner in overtime, in a 26–23 victory over the Seattle Seahawks, earning him NFC Special Teams Player of the Week honors. Gould was named NFC Special Teams Player of the Month for December. Overall, in the 2018 season, Gould converted 27 of 29 extra point attempts and 33 of 34 field goal attempts.

==== 2019 season ====
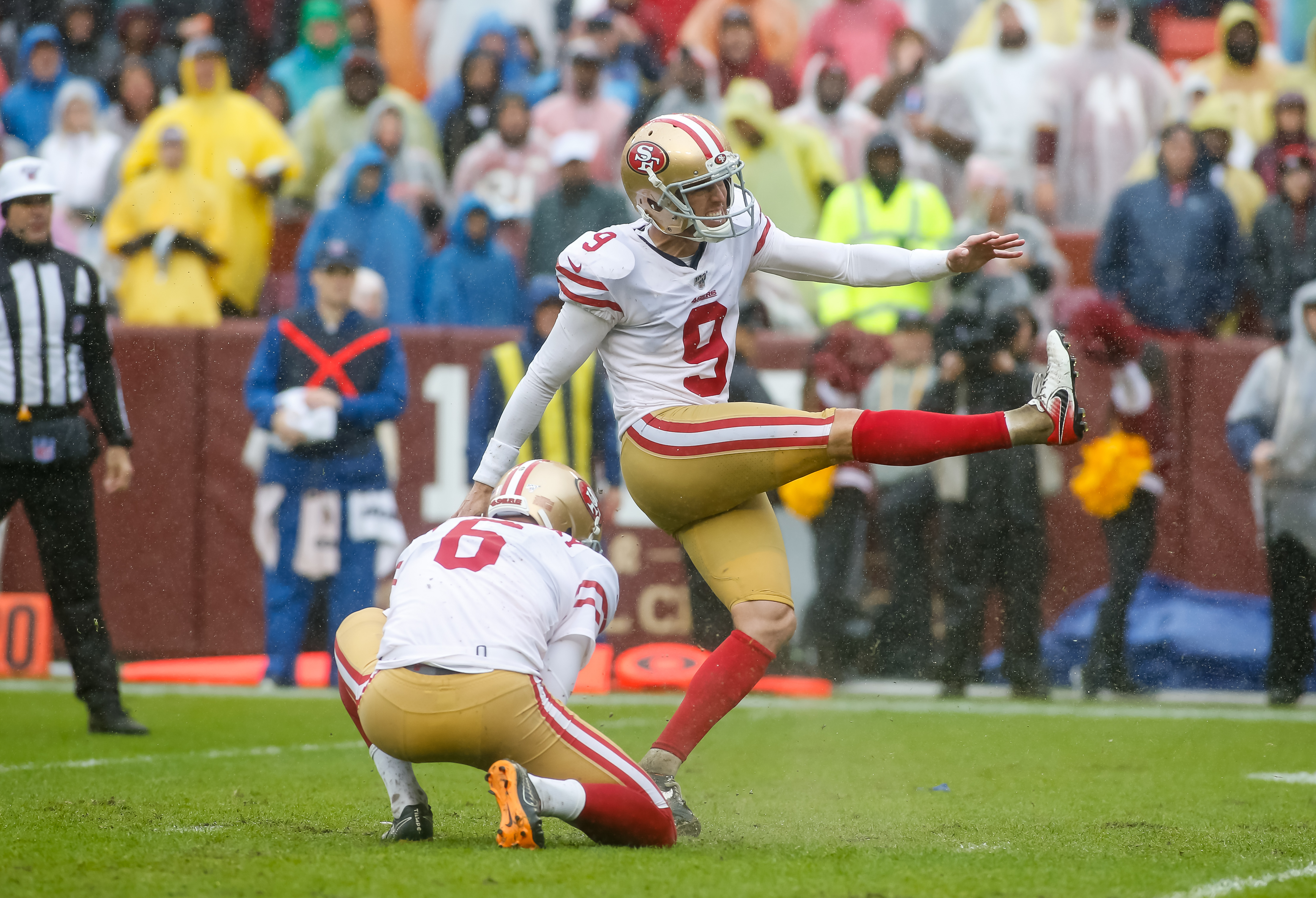
Gould in a game against the Washington Redskins

On February 26, 2019, the 49ers placed the franchise tag on Gould. On April 24, Gould requested a trade from San Francisco. However, on July 15, Gould and the 49ers reached an agreement on a four-year, $19 million extension with $10.5 million guaranteed.

In the 2019 season, Gould converted 41 of 42 extra point attempts and 23 of 31 field goal attempts. He contributed to two wins by kicking a game-winning field goal, one in Week 14 against the New Orleans Saints and one in Week 16 against the Los Angeles Rams. For his game against the Rams, Gould earned NFC Special Teams Player of the Week honors. For the month of December, he earned NFC Special Teams Player of the Month honors.

During Super Bowl LIV, Gould's second Super Bowl and tenth NFL playoff game, Gould made both of his field goals, raising his career playoff totals to 15-for-15. However, the 49ers lost 31–20 to the Kansas City Chiefs.

==== 2020 season ====
During Week 12 against the Los Angeles Rams, Gould hit the 42-yard game winning field goal in the 23–20 road victory. He was named the NFC Special Teams Player of the Week for his performance.

On December 30, 2020, Gould and the 49ers agreed to a two-year, $7.25 million extension. He was placed on the reserve/COVID-19 list by the team on the same day, and activated on January 14, 2021. Gould finished the 2020 season converting 36 of 38 extra point tries and 19 of 23 field goal tries.

==== 2021 season ====
On October 5, 2021, Gould was placed on injured reserve after suffering a groin injury before Week 4. He was activated on November 6.

In the regular-season finale against the Los Angeles Rams, Gould had to take over punting duties in addition to kicking duties after punter Mitch Wishnowsky suffered a concussion in the first half of the game. Gould punted twice for 90 yards and made two field goals, including the game-winner in overtime, to help the 49ers win 27–24 and clinch a playoff berth. For his performance, Gould was named NFC Special Teams Player of the Week. In the 2021 season, he converted 39 of 40 extra point attempts and 20 of 23 field goal attempts.

During the Divisional Round, Gould kicked the game-winning 45-yard field goal as time expired to upset the top-seeded Green Bay Packers 13–10 on the road and advance the 49ers to the NFC Championship Game. This put Gould at a perfect 20-for-20 on field goal attempts in the playoffs for his career.

==== 2022 season ====
During the season-opener, Gould kicked a 25-yard field goal and made his sole extra point attempt in a 19–10 road loss to his former team, the Bears. In the next game against the Seattle Seahawks, Gould made two out of three field goal attempts and made all three extra point attempts during the 27–7 victory. Three weeks later against the Carolina Panthers, he made one of two field goals and all three extra point attempts in the 37–15 victory. During Week 10 against the Los Angeles Chargers, Gould made all three of his field goals and one of two extra point attempts in the 22–16 victory. Three weeks later, Gould made all four of his field goals and all three of his extra-point attempts in a 33–17 victory over the Miami Dolphins.

In the Wild Card game against the Seahawks, Gould made all four of his field goals and all three of his extra-point attempts in a 41–23 victory. In the Divisional Round against the Dallas Cowboys, Gould was the main factor in the 49ers' game, as he made all four of his field goals and his sole extra-point attempt, contributing 13 points to the 19–12 victory. He was not used as much in the NFC Championship Game against the Philadelphia Eagles, in which his only kicking attempt was a successful extra-point attempt.

Gould made 27 out of 32 field goals and 50 out of 51 extra-point attempts during the season.

On March 4, 2023, Gould announced that he would depart from San Francisco after six seasons and play somewhere else for the 2023 NFL season. He later said that he wanted to return to the 49ers, but never received an offer from the team, commenting, "The change wasn't my decision. Obviously, at the end of the season, they had to make a decision, and ultimately they wanted to go in a different direction."

=== Retirement ===
On December 7, 2023, Gould announced his retirement from professional football. He retired having made 86.5% of his field goals, the ninth-most accurate stat in NFL history, and having never missed a single field goal or extra point attempt in the postseason. Gould is also the 10th all-time leading scorer in NFL history. After his retirement, the Bears marked Gould 62nd on their 100 greatest Bears of All-Time list.

== Coaching career ==
On February 23, 2024, Gould was hired as the head football coach at Rolling Meadows High School in Illinois. He resigned on December 3, after the team went 5–5 in his first season.

On December 10, 2024, Gould was hired as the head football coach at St. Viator High School in Arlington Heights, Illinois. After opening the season with a 22–19 victory over Marian Catholic, the team lost the rest of the games of the season and finished with a 1–8 record.

Gould resigned from his position after finishing his second at St. Viator season with a 2–7 record.

== Career statistics ==
=== NFL ===
Legend
	NFL record
	Led the league
**Bold**	Career high

==== Regular season ====
Year	Team	GP	Overall FGs				PATs			Kickoffs			Points
Year	Team	GP	Lng	FGM	FGA	Pct	XPM	XPA	Pct	KO	Avg	TB	Points
2005	CHI	13	45	21	27	77.8	19	20	95.0	54	61.4	1	82
2006	CHI	16	49	32	36	88.9	47	47	**100.0**	**95**	65.0	11	143
2007	CHI	16	49	31	36	86.1	33	33	**100.0**	79	58.8	3	126
2008	CHI	16	48	26	29	89.7	41	41	**100.0**	79	64.9	9	119
2009	CHI	16	52	24	28	85.7	33	33	**100.0**	73	65.0	8	105
2010	CHI	16	54	25	30	83.3	35	35	**100.0**	77	63.5	16	110
2011	CHI	16	57	28	32	87.5	37	37	**100.0**	81	63.2	43	121
2012	CHI	13	54	21	25	84.0	33	33	**100.0**	66	**65.2**	38	96
2013	CHI	16	**58**	26	29	89.7	45	46	97.8	89	58.7	38	123
2014	CHI	12	45	9	12	75.0	28	29	96.6	53	60.0	21	55
2015	CHI	16	55	33	39	84.6	28	29	96.6	83	60.3	39	127
2016	NYG	10	47	10	10	**100.0**	20	23	87.0	43	62.1	19	50
2017	SF	16	52	**39**	**41**	95.1	28	30	93.3	4	25.3	0	**145**
2018	SF	16	53	33	34	97.1	27	29	93.1	4	25.5	0	126
2019	SF	13	47	23	31	74.2	41	42	97.6	1	37.0	0	110
2020	SF	15	52	19	23	82.6	36	38	94.7	13	44.4	1	93
2021	SF	13	52	20	23	87.0	39	40	97.5	19	63.3	8	99
2022	SF	**17**	51	27	32	84.4	**50**	**51**	98.0	**95**	63.0	**47**	131
Career		266	58	447	517	86.5	620	636	97.5	1,008	61.9	302	1,961

==== Postseason ====
Year	Team	GP	Overall FGs				PATs			Kickoffs			Points
Year	Team	GP	Lng	FGM	FGA	Pct	XPM	XPA	Pct	KO	Avg	TB	Points
2005	CHI	1	—	—	—	—	3	3	100.0	4	59.0	0	3
2006	CHI	**3**	49	6	6	**100.0**	**9**	**9**	100.0	**18**	63.2	1	27
2010	CHI	2	—	—	—	—	7	7	100.0	9	**64.4**	1	7
2016	NYG	1	40	2	2	**100.0**	1	1	100.0	4	58.8	0	7
2019	SF	**3**	**54**	7	7	**100.0**	**9**	**9**	100.0	—	—	—	**30**
2021	SF	**3**	53	6	6	**100.0**	5	5	100.0	12	62.8	**6**	23
2022	SF	**3**	50	**8**	**8**	**100.0**	5	5	100.0	16	62.9	4	29
Career		16	54	29	29	100.0	39	39	100.0	63	62.7	12	126

=== College ===
Year	Team	G	XPM	XPA	XP%	FGM	FGA	FG%	Pts
2001	Penn State	11	29	29	100.0	6	10	60.0	47
2002	Penn State	13	42	45	93.3	17	22	77.3	93
2003	Penn State	12	22	24	91.7	9	16	56.3	49
2004	Penn State	11	22	23	95.7	7	13	53.8	43
**Career**		**47**	**115**	**121**	**95.0**	**39**	**61**	**63.9**	**232**

== Career highlights ==
=== Awards and honors ===
- First-team All-Pro (2006)
- Pro Bowl (2006)
- 100 greatest Bears of All-Time

=== Records ===
==== NFL records ====
- Highest percentage of postseason field goals converted: 100%

==== Bears franchise records ====
- All-time leading scorer: 1,207 points
- Most career field goals converted: 276
- Most 50+ yard field goals: 23
- Highest percentage of field goals converted: 85.4%

==== 49ers franchise records ====
- Most field goals converted in a single game: 6 (tied with Ray Wersching, Jeff Wilkins, and Jake Moody)
- Most consecutive field goals made: 33 (2017)
- Highest percentage of field goals converted in a single season: 97.1% (2018)

== Personal life ==
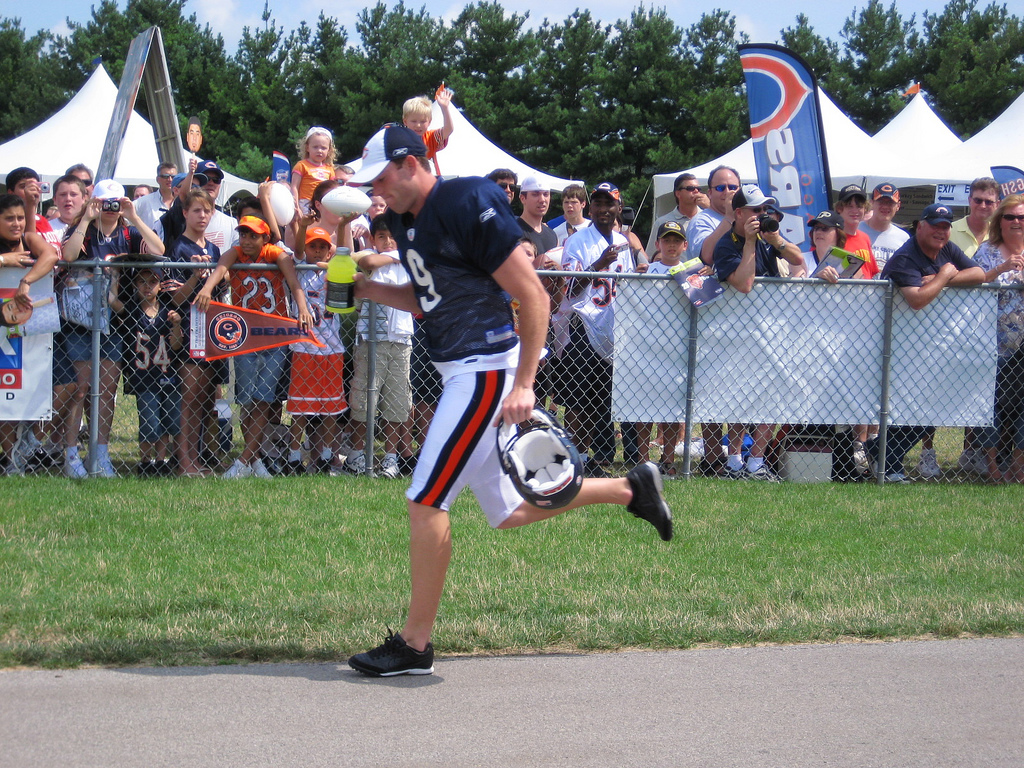
Gould at 2008 summer training camp

Despite the difference in spelling, his surname ("Gould") uses the same pronunciation as the element (gold): "gōld". This has prompted some announcers to make announcements such as "Robbie Gould is gold", "Solid Gould" or "Good as Gould" upon his successful field goal attempts.

Gould's younger brother, Chris, was a kicker for the University of Virginia and in the Arena Football League, and is currently an assistant special teams coach for the Los Angeles Chargers. The two also have a cousin, Brandon Thomas Gould, who played on the offensive line for Bethune-Cookman University.

On December 1, 2013, Gould's wife Lauren gave birth to their first child, a son.

Gould started The Goulden Touch Foundation in 2011 to help those in need. In 2012, The Goulden Touch launched an annual event, "Kicking Hunger," which provides meals and raises funds for the Northern Illinois Food Bank.

When asked what Gould would like to do upon retiring from football, he said, "I went to Penn State and graduated with a business management degree. I would love to run a huge corporation at some time. Obviously I'm going to take baby steps. I'm going to play in the NFL as long as they will let me play but I've done a pretty good job trying to set myself up for that transition out of football. Whether it's starting to co-host a radio show on ESPN100 or doing Monday morning call-ins after the games with one of the local radio stations or interning with buddies of mine who own huge companies."

Gould currently resides in Inverness, Illinois with his wife and 3 sons.
