= Northern Illinois Food Bank =

Non-profit organization in Illinois, US

- Formation: 1983; 43 years ago
- Type: Non-profit
- Legal status: 501(c)(3)
- Headquarters: 273 Dearborn Court; Geneva, IL 60134; United States
- Region served: Northern Illinois
- Members: 900 food pantries, soup kitchens, shelters and feeding programs
- President and CEO: Julie Yurko
- Website: solvehungertoday.org

Northern Illinois Food Bank is a 501(c)(3) nonprofit organization and a member of Feeding America. Its network of more than 900 food pantries, soup kitchens, shelters and feeding programs provide nutritious food and resources to more than 570,000 neighbors a month throughout 13 counties in suburban and rural Northern Illinois. They bring together manufacturers, local and corporate grocers, area farmers, corporations, foundations, and individuals who donate food and funding. Each week, 1,000 volunteers help evaluate, repack, and distribute food from each of the four distribution centers located in Geneva, Lake Forest, Rockford and Joliet.

== History ==
- In 1983, Sister Rosemarie Burian founded the Food Bank out of DuPage County, Illinois. It was named the Bethlehem Center, now known as Northern Illinois Food Bank. In its first year, Bethlehem Center distributed 64,000 pounds of food.
- By 1985, the center serviced over 100 food pantries in DuPage, Will, Kane, and McHenry counties in Northern Illinois.
- In 1994, Northern Illinois Food Bank became a certified affiliate of the Feeding America network.
- In 2000, Bethlehem Center Food Bank changed its name to Northern Illinois Food Bank.
- In 2005, the Food Bank opened the Northwest Center in Rockford.
- By 2008, the Food Bank was distributing 22 million pounds of food.
- In 2011, 36 million pounds of food were distributed with the help of 600 partner agencies.
- In 2011, the West Suburban Center outgrew their space and built a larger facility in Geneva. The organization was recognized for being the first Food Bank to have a new facility with LEED Gold Certification for sustainable design and operation.
- In 2015, the Holiday Meal Box program began.
- In 2018, the Food Bank opened the South Suburban Center in Joliet.
- In 2019, the Food Bank launched the first online food pantry model in the Feeding America network, My Pantry Express (MPX).
- In 2020, Food Bank leadership and staff completed Strategic Plan 2020, achieving equitable access to charitable food in 98% of the communities served.
- At the peak of the COVID-19 pandemic, the Food Bank served 100 million meals.
- In 2023, the Food Bank marked its 40th anniversary and announced that May 18th will be Founder's Day to honor the Food Bank's founder, Sister Rosemarie Burian, on her birthday.
- In 2024, the Northwest Suburban Center's Winnebago Community Market was renamed the Neighborhood Market and relocated to a larger center in Rockford.

== Network ==
The Food Bank relies on a community of supporters including 20,000 volunteers, 30,000 food and fund donors, and 900 agencies and program partners.

== Distribution centers ==
Northern Illinois Food Bank has four distribution centers. They are located in Geneva, Lake Forest, Rockford, and Joliet.

The West Suburban Center (Geneva) is home to the Food Bank's largest distribution center. It is 147,000 square feet and provides more than 82 million meals a year in 13 counties throughout suburban and rural Northern Illinois.

The North Suburban Center (Lake Forest) distribution center has 28,000 square feet of space.

The Northwest Center (Rockford) distribution center has 30,000 square feet of space and is home to the Food Bank's Neighborhood Market Food Pantry.

The South Suburban Office (Joliet) distribution center is 18,000 square feet.

== Programs ==
=== After School Program ===
The After School Program, or Child and Adult Care Feeding Program (CACFP), is an after school meal program funded by the USDA and administered by the Illinois State Board of Education. Northern Illinois Food Bank sponsors the program and gets reimbursed for serving meals to children at approved sites.

=== BackPack Program ===
The BackPack Program provides food to supplement weekend meals for a child and their siblings. Children are identified by school staff who recognize signs of chronic hunger or are aware of families dealing with food insecurity. They distribute backpacks to students on Fridays. The program is funded entirely by private donations.

=== Holiday Meal Box ===
Started in 2019, the Holiday Meal Box program is an annual initiative that provides holiday meals to families. Thanks to the support of sponsors and volunteers, the Food Bank provides an average of 50,000 Holiday Meal Boxes across 13 counties in rural and suburban Northern Illinois. Each Holiday Meal Box feeds a family of 6-8 and contains traditional holiday meal trimmings. Depending on the location, neighbors will also receive a whole turkey, turkey breast, or ham.

=== Meals on the Move ===
During the summer, Northern Illinois Food Bank operates a mobile program called Meals on the Move. The Meals on the Move truck travels to six different locations throughout Aurora to serve free meals to children 18 years and young. The program is administered by the Illinois State Board of Education in partnership with the USDA Summer Food Service Program. The program partners with the Aurora Public Library bookmobile and Fox Valley Park District Neighborhood Art Program to provide activities for the children.

=== My Pantry Express (MPX) ===
My Pantry Express (MPX) is an online food pantry developed and operated by Northern Illinois Food Bank in collaboration with community partners. The Food Bank was the first in the Feeding America network to launch an online food panty model. Volunteers pack the orders and neighbors can either pick it up or sign up for free delivery.

=== SNAP/Food Stamps ===
Northern Illinois Food Bank participates in the Supplemental Nutrition Assistance Program (SNAP), which provides food-purchasing assistance to individuals with little or no income to help them maintain adequate nutrition and health. The Food Bank's SNAP hotline helps neighbors navigate the application process and answer questions.

=== Summer Meal Program ===
The Summer Meal Program, or Summer Food Service Program (SFSP) is funded by the USDA and administered by the Illinois State Board of Education. Northern Illinois Food Bank sponsors the program and provides breakfast, lunch and snacks at over 130 locations to children 18 and under. The program runs from June to mid-August each year.

== Events and fundraising ==
Northern Illinois Food Bank holds four signature fundraisers annually: A Cup of Hope, a luncheon and auction hosted by the Executive Women's Council held in March; the Fight Hunger 5K and Fun Run with post race festival in May; A Taste That Matters, featuring a silent auction and culinary creation from local chefs in June; and the Hunger Scramble golf outing in August.

== Recognition ==
Charity Navigator rated Northern Illinois Food Bank four out of four stars and gave it an overall score of 99%. The star rating is a reflection of the overall score. The overall score indicates how efficiently a charity will use their support, how well it has sustained its programs and services over time, and their level of commitment to accountability and transparency."

In 2024, Northern Illinois Food Bank received the Feeding America Network Celebrations Award for its online ordering program, OrderAhead.

== See also ==
- List of food banks
