= 2001 Seattle Mariners season =

2001 Seattle Mariners
- American League West champions
- League: American League
- Division: West
- Ballpark: Safeco Field
- City: Seattle, Washington
- Record: 116–46 (.716)
- Divisional place: 1st
- Owners: Hiroshi Yamauchi (represented by Howard Lincoln)
- General managers: Pat Gillick
- Managers: Lou Piniella
- Television: KSTW-TV 11; FSN Northwest (Dave Niehaus, Rick Rizzs, Ron Fairly, Dave Valle, Dave Henderson, Tom Paciorek)
- Radio: KIRO 710 AM (Dave Niehaus, Rick Rizzs, Ron Fairly, Dave Valle, Dave Henderson)

The Seattle Mariners' 2001 season was the 25th since the franchise's inception. Widely considered one of the greatest baseball teams of all time, they finished with a 116–46 record (.71605 win %), tying the major league record for wins in the modern era since 1901, set by the 1906 Chicago Cubs, and setting the record for wins by an American League team.

Of the 116 wins, 59 were by four or more runs, setting a record that was later broken by the 2022 and 2023 Los Angeles Dodgers, each with 60 such wins. They also led the majors in both runs scored and fewest runs allowed. The 2001 Mariners hold the record for the most Wins Above Replacement (WAR) by a team in a season in MLB history, with 50.4. Even the 1927 New York Yankees, often considered the greatest team of all time due to their elite "Murderers’ Row" lineup, fell short of the Mariners; they recorded 48.7 WAR, 1.7 less than the Mariners, the second-highest single-season total in MLB history.

On August 5, 2001, the Cleveland Indians accomplished a historic 12-run comeback, defeating the Seattle Mariners 15–14 in 11 innings, after trailing 14-2 in the 7th inning. This remarkable victory, known as the "Great Return," tied a major league record for the largest comeback in a game, featuring five runs with two outs in the ninth inning.

The 2001 season was also notable for the Major League debut of star Japanese outfielder Ichiro Suzuki, who led the league in batting average and won both the AL Rookie of the Year and the AL MVP awards. Additionally, the Mariners hosted their second All-Star Game on July 10.

Winning the American League West, the 2001 season marked the first time the Mariners reached the postseason in consecutive seasons. The team defeated the Cleveland Indians in the ALDS in five games, but fell to the New York Yankees in five games in the ALCS. They became the first team in MLB history to win 110 or more regular season games and fail to reach the World Series. They would later be joined in this regard by the 2022 Los Angeles Dodgers.

Despite the record-setting win total, the Mariners would not reach the postseason again until 2022, which was the longest active drought in the four major North American sports. They would also not win the AL West or return to the ALCS again until the 2025 season.

== Offseason ==
- November 7, 2000: Scott Podsednik was signed as a free agent with the Seattle Mariners.
- November 18, 2000: Ichiro Suzuki was signed as a free agent with the Seattle Mariners.
- December 22, 2000: Bret Boone was signed as a free agent with the Seattle Mariners.

== Regular season ==
=== Roster ===
2001 Seattle Mariners
**Roster**
**Pitchers**: 48 Paul Abbott; 37 Norm Charlton; 45 Ryan Franklin; 61 Brian Fuentes; 34 Freddy García; 54 John Halama; 50 Jamie Moyer; 43 Jeff Nelson; 36 José Paniagua; 38 Joel Piñeiro; 53 Arthur Rhodes; 22 Kazuhiro Sasaki; 30 Aaron Sele; 67 Denny Stark; 40 Brett Tomko	**Catchers**: 10 Pat Borders; 17 Tom Lampkin; 6 Dan Wilson; **Infielders**: 25 David Bell; 29 Bret Boone; 8 Carlos Guillén; 5 John Olerud; 10 Ed Sprague Jr.; 13 Ramon Vazquez	**Outfielders**: 19 Jay Buhner; 44 Mike Cameron; 1 Charles Gipson; 28 Stan Javier; 18 Gene Kingsale; 23 Al Martin; 4 Mark McLemore; 20 Scott Podsednik; 10 Anthony Sanders; 51 Ichiro Suzuki; **Designated Hitter**: 11 Edgar Martínez	**Manager**: 14 Lou Piniella; **Coaches**: 7 John McLaren (bench); 12 John Moses (first base); 31 Dave Myers (third base); 27 Gerald Perry (hitting); 35 Bryan Price (pitching); 15 Matt Sinatro (bullpen)

=== Season standings ===
AL West
Team	W	L	Pct.	GB	Home	Road
Seattle Mariners	116	46	.716	—	57‍–‍24	59‍–‍22
Oakland Athletics	102	60	.630	14	53‍–‍28	49‍–‍32
Anaheim Angels	75	87	.463	41	39‍–‍42	36‍–‍45
Texas Rangers	73	89	.451	43	41‍–‍41	32‍–‍48

=== Detailed records ===
Opponent	Home	Away	Total	Pct.
**AL East**
Baltimore Orioles	6–0	2–1	8–1	.889
Boston Red Sox	2–1	4–2	6–3	.667
New York Yankees	1–2	5–1	6–3	.667
Tampa Bay Devil Rays	5–1	2–1	7–2	.778
Toronto Blue Jays	3–3	3–0	6–3	.667
	**17–7**	**16–5**	**33–12**	**.733**
**AL Central**
Chicago White Sox	5–1	2–1	7–2	.778
Cleveland Indians	2–1	3–1	5–2	.714
Detroit Tigers	3–1	2–1	5–2	.714
Kansas City Royals	1–2	5–1	6–3	.667
Minnesota Twins	3–0	5–1	8–1	.889
	**14–5**	**17–5**	**31–10**	**.756**
**AL West**
Anaheim Angels	7–3	8–1	15–4	.789
Oakland Athletics	5–4	5–5	10–9	.526
Texas Rangers	8–2	7–3	15–5	.750
	**20–9**	**20–9**	**40–18**	**.690**
**NL West**
Arizona Diamondbacks	2–1	0–0	2–1	.667
Colorado Rockies	0–0	2–1	2–1	.667
Los Angeles Dodgers	0–0	2–1	2–1	.667
San Diego Padres	2–1	2–1	4–2	.667
San Francisco Giants	2–1	0–0	2–1	.667
	**6–3**	**6–3**	**12–6**	**.667**

=== Record vs. opponents ===
2001 American League record Source: MLB Standings Grid – 2001
Team	ANA	BAL	BOS	CWS	CLE	DET	KC	MIN	NYY	OAK	SEA	TB	TEX	TOR	NL
Anaheim	—	4–5	4–3	6–3	5–4	5–4	5–4	3–6	4–3	6–14	4–15	7–2	7–12	5–4	10–8
Baltimore	5–4	—	9–10	3–4	1–5	4–2	5–2	3–3	5–13–1	2–7	1–8	10–9	2–7	7–12	6–12
Boston	3–4	10–9	—	3–3	3–6	4–5	3–3	3–3	5–13	4–5	3–6	14–5	5–2	12–7	10–8
Chicago	3–6	4–3	3–3	—	10–9	13–6	14–5	5–14	1–5	1–8	2–7	5–2	7–2	3–3	12–6
Cleveland	4–5	5–1	6–3	9–10	—	13–6	11–8	14–5	4–5	4–3	2–5	5–1	5–4	2–4	7–11
Detroit	4–5	2–4	5–4	6–13	6–13	—	8–11	4–15	4–5	1–6	2–5	4–2	8–1	2–4	10–8
Kansas City	4–5	2–5	3–3	5–14	8–11	11–8	—	6–13	0–6	3–6	3–6	4–2	4–5	4–3	8–10
Minnesota	6–3	3–3	3–3	14–5	5–14	15–4	13–6	—	4–2	5–4	1–8	1–6	4–5	2–5	9–9
New York	3–4	13–5–1	13–5	5–1	5–4	5–4	6–0	2–4	—	3–6	3–6	13–6	3–4	11–8	10–8
Oakland	14–6	7–2	5–4	8–1	3–4	6–1	6–3	4–5	6–3	—	9–10	7–2	9–10	6–3	12–6
Seattle	15–4	8–1	6–3	7–2	5–2	5–2	6–3	8–1	6–3	10–9	—	7–2	15–5	6–3	12–6
Tampa Bay	2–7	9–10	5–14	2–5	1–5	2–4	2–4	6–1	6–13	2–7	2–7	—	4–5	9–10	10–8
Texas	12–7	7–2	2–5	2–7	4–5	1–8	5–4	5–4	4–3	10–9	5–15	5–4	—	3–6	8–10
Toronto	4–5	12–7	7–12	3–3	4–2	4–2	3–4	5–2	8–11	3–6	3–6	10–9	6–3	—	8–10

=== Game log ===
2001 game log: 116–46 (Home: 57–24; Away: 59–22)
April: 20–5 (Home: 8–2; Away: 12–3)

#	Date	Opponent	Score	Win	Loss	Save	Attendance	Record	Streak
1	April 2	Athletics	5–4	**Rhodes** (1–0)	Mecir (0–1)	**Sasaki** (1)	45,911	1–0	W1
2	April 3	Athletics	1–5	Zito (1–0)	**Halama** (0–1)	–	27,212	1–1	L1
3	April 4	Athletics	10–2	**Sele** (1–0)	Heredia (0–1)	–	31,382	2–1	W1
4	April 6	@ Rangers	9–7 (10)	**Rhodes** (2–0)	Zimmerman (0–1)	**Sasaki** (2)	34,684	3–1	W2
5	April 7	@ Rangers	6–5	**Franklin** (1–0)	Davis (0–1)	**Sasaki** (3)	41,651	4–1	W3
6	April 8	@ Rangers	4–5	Venafro (1–0)	**Paniagua** (0–1)	Crabtree (2)	44,306	4–2	L1
7	April 10	@ Athletics	5–1	**Halama** (1–1)	Heredia (0–2)	**Sasaki** (4)	14,880	5–2	W1
8	April 11	@ Athletics	3–0	**Sele** (2–0)	Mecir (0–2)	**Sasaki** (5)	16,652	6–2	W2
9	April 12	@ Athletics	7–3	**Moyer** (1–0)	Hudson (1–1)	–	15,414	7–2	W3
10	April 13	@ Angels	3–4	Hasegawa (1–0)	**Sasaki** (0–1)	–	31,087	7–3	L1
11	April 14	@ Angels	2–1	**García** (1–0)	Valdez (0–1)	**Sasaki** (6)	34,780	8–3	W1
12	April 15	@ Angels	7–5	**Paniagua** (1–1)	Hasegawa (1–1)	**Nelson** (1)	20,733	9–3	W2
13	April 16	Rangers	9–7	**Franklin** (2–0)	Glynn (0–3)	–	45,657	10–3	W3
14	April 17	Rangers	6–4	**Moyer** (2–0)	Helling (0–3)	**Sasaki** (7)	34,536	11–3	W4
15	April 18	Rangers	6–8	Davis (2–1)	**Tomko** (0–1)	Zimmerman (1)	48,823	11–4	L1
16	April 19	Angels	3–2	**García** (2–0)	Valdez (0–2)	**Sasaki** (8)	25,016	12–4	W1
17	April 20	Angels	4–1	**Halama** (2–1)	Rapp (0–3)	**Sasaki** (9)	39,274	13–4	W2
18	April 21	Angels	5–2	**Moyer** (3–0)	Washburn (0–2)	**Nelson** (2)	39,274	14–4	W3
19	April 22	Angels	5–0	**Sele** (3–0)	Ortiz (2–2)	–	44,192	15–4	W4
20	April 24	@ Yankees	7–5	**García** (3–0)	Stanton (1–1)	**Sasaki** (10)	29,522	16–4	W5
21	April 25	@ Yankees	7–5	**Charlton** (1–0)	Pettitte (3–2)	**Sasaki** (11)	23,684	17–4	W6
22	April 26	@ Yankees	7–3	**Moyer** (4–0)	Mussina (1–3)	**Rhodes** (1)	30,218	18–4	W7
23	April 27	@ White Sox	8–3	**Sele** (4–0)	Baldwin (0–1)	**Sasaki** (12)	16,276	19–4	W8
24	April 28	@ White Sox	8–5	**Tomko** (1–1)	Biddle (1–1)	**Sasaki** (13)	25,542	20–4	W9
25	April 29	@ White Sox	1–2 (14)	Glover (2–1)	**Franklin** (2–1)	–	25,442	20–5	L1

May: 20–7 (Home: 10–5; Away: 10–2)

#	Date	Opponent	Score	Win	Loss	Save	Attendance	Record	Streak
26	May 1	Red Sox	0–2	Martínez (3–0)	**Halama** (2–2)	Arrojo (4)	36,642	20–6	L2
27	May 2	Red Sox	5–1	**Sele** (5–0)	Nomo (3–2)	–	40,170	21–6	W1
28	May 3	Red Sox	10–3	**Moyer** (5–0)	Castillo (3–2)	–	32,513	22–6	W2
29	May 4	Blue Jays	3–8	Parris (2–2)	**Abott** (0–1)	–	42,284	22–7	L1
30	May 5	Blue Jays	7–5	**Rhodes** (3–0)	Borbón (0–2)	**Sasaki** (14)	42,894	23–7	W1
31	May 6	Blue Jays	3–11	Carpenter (3–1)	**Halama** (2–3)	–	45,080	23–8	L1
32	May 8	@ Red Sox	4–12	Nomo (4–2)	**Moyer** (5–1)	–	32,941	23–9	L2
33	May 9	@ Red Sox	10–5	**Nelson** (1–0)	Arrojo (1–1)	**Sasaki** (15)	31,616	24–9	W1
34	May 10	@ Red Sox	5–2	**Halama** (3–3)	Ohka (2–2)	**Sasaki** (16)	31,428	25–9	W2
35	May 11	@ Blue Jays	7–2	**Abbott** (1–1)	Hamilton (1–2)	–	20,279	26–9	W3
36	May 12	@ Blue Jays	11–7	**Tomko** (2–1)	Escobar (0–1)	–	24,908	27–9	W4
37	May 13	@ Blue Jays	7–5	**Moyer** (6–1)	Loaiza (4–4)	**Sasaki** (17)	20,624	28–9	W5
38	May 15	White Sox	4–3	**Nelson** (2–0)	Howry (2–1)	**Paniagua** (1)	31,096	29–9	W6
39	May 16	White Sox	7–2	**Abbott** (2–1)	Biddle (1–3)	**Paniagua** (2)	33,748	30–9	W7
40	May 17	White Sox	5–1	**García** (4–0)	Wells (3–4)	**Nelson** (3)	43,510	31–9	W8
41	May 18	Yankees	10–14	Mendoza (3–1)	**Halama** (3–4)	–	45,794	31–10	L1
42	May 19	Yankees	1–2 (10)	Stanton (4–1)	**Sasaki** (0–2)	Rivera (12)	45,880	31–11	L2
43	May 20	Yankees	6–2	**Sele** (6–0)	Clemens (4–1)	–	45,953	32–11	W1
44	May 22	@ Twins	11–12	Wells (4–1)	**Abbott** (2–2)	–	29,005	32–12	L1
45	May 23	@ Twins	5–4	**Rhodes** (4–0)	Carrasco (2–1)	**Sasaki** (18)	26,605	33–12	W1
46	May 25	@ Royals	9–6	**Franklin** (3–1)	Grimsley (0–2)	**Sasaki** (19)	17,555	34–12	W2
47	May 26	@ Royals	7–2	**Sele** (2–0)	Meadows (1–6)	–	21,368	35–12	W3
48	May 27	@ Royals	5–4	**Charlton** (7–0)	Santiago (2–2)	–	19,524	36–12	W4
49	May 28	@ Royals	13–3	**Abbott** (3–2)	Durbin (3–3)	–	20,142	37–12	W5
50	May 29	Orioles	3–2	**García** (5–0)	Roberts (5–4)	**Sasaki** (20)	30,413	38–12	W6
51	May 30	Orioles	12–5	**Halama** (4–4)	Johnson (4–3)	–	34,757	39–12	W7
52	May 31	Orioles	2–1	**Sele** (8–0)	Mercedes (1–7)	**Sasaki** (21)	37,612	40–12	W8

June: 18–9 (Home: 10–5; Away: 8–4)

#	Date	Opponent	Score	Win	Loss	Save	Attendance	Record	Streak
53	June 1	Devil Rays	8–4	**Moyer** (7–1)	Rekar (0–7)	**Nelson** (4)	41,094	41–12	W9
54	June 2	Devil Rays	7–4	**Abbott** (4–2)	Rupe (2–5)	**Sasaki** (22)	45,473	42–12	W10
55	June 3	Devil Rays	8–4	**García** (6–0)	Sturtze (2–5)	**Sasaki** (23)	45,390	43–12	W11
56	June 4	Rangers	11–6	**Franklin** (4–1)	Venafro (1–2)	–	45,812	44–12	W12
57	June 5	Rangers	5–4	**Paniagua** (2–1)	Smart (1–1)	**Sasaki** (24)	44,853	45–12	W13
58	June 6	Rangers	7–3	**Moyer** (8–1)	Oliver (4–2)	–	45,754	46–12	W14
59	June 8	Padres	7–1	**Abbott** (5–2)	Jarvis (3–6)	–	45,293	47–12	W15
60	June 9	Padres	3–6	Jones (3–8)	**García** (6–1)	Hoffman (12)	45,322	47–13	L1
61	June 10	Padres	8–1	**Halama** (5–4)	Loewer (0–1)	–	45,418	48–13	W1
62	June 12	@ Rockies	10–9	**Fuentes** (1–0)	Acevedo (0–1)	**Sasaki** (25)	41,263	49–13	W2
–	June 13	@ Rockies	Postponed (rain); rescheduled June 14 (game 1)						
63	June 14 (1)	@ Rockies	2–8	Chacón (4–3)	**Moyer** (8–2)	–	45,261	49–14	L1
64	June 14 (2)	@ Rockies	5–1	**Abbott** (6–2)	Astacio (5–7)	–	37,048	50–14	W1
65	June 15	@ Padres	5–1	**García** (7–1)	Jones (3–9)	–	60,918	51–14	W2
66	June 16	@ Padres	9–2	**Halama** (6–4)	Loewer (0–2)	–	61,065	52–14	W3
67	June 17	@ Padres	9–11	Davey (2–2)	**Nelson** (2–1)	Hoffman (14)	36,027	52–15	L1
68	June 18	@ Athletics	3–4	Zito (4–6)	**Charlton** (2–1)	Isringhausen (13)	16,368	52–16	L2
69	June 19	@ Athletics	8–7	**Rhodes** (5–0)	Isringhausen (1–2)	**Sasaki** (26)	17,542	53–16	W1
70	June 20	@ Athletics	4–6	Guthrie (5–1)	**Sasaki** (0–3)	–	40,639	53–17	L1
71	June 21	@ Athletics	12–10	**Paniagua** (3–1)	Tam (0–3)	**Rhodes** (2)	23,642	54–17	W1
72	June 22	Angels	1–8	Washburn (5–4)	**Sele** (8–1)	–	45,461	54–18	L1
73	June 23	Angels	1–2	Rapp (2–7)	**Moyer** (8–3)	Percival (18)	45,430	54–19	L2
74	June 24	Angels	7–3	**Abbott** (7–2)	Schoeneweis (6–6)	**Sasaki** (27)	45,722	55–19	W1
75	June 26	Athletics	7–3	**García** (8–1)	Mulder (8–5)	–	45,337	56–19	W2
76	June 27	Athletics	3–6	Hudson (8–5)	**Halama** (6–5)	Isringhausen (14)	45,104	56–20	L1
77	June 28	Athletics	3–6	Guthrie (6–1)	**Fuentes** (1–1)	Isringhausen (15)	45,399	56–21	L2
78	June 29	@ Angels	9–5	**Moyer** (9–3)	Schoeneweis (6–7)	–	40,822	57–21	W1
79	June 30	@ Angels	5–3	**Stark** (1–0)	Ortiz (6–6)	**Sasaki** (28)	27,784	58–21	W2

July: 18–9 (Home: 8–4; Away: 10–5)

#	Date	Opponent	Score	Win	Loss	Save	Attendance	Record	Streak
80	July 1	@ Angels	5–0	**García** (9–1)	Wise (1–2)	–	28,887	59–21	W3
81	July 2	@ Rangers	9–7 (10)	**Nelson** (3–1)	Petkovsek (0–1)	**Sasaki** (29)	28,487	60–21	W4
82	July 3	@ Rangers	8–4	**Sele** (9–1)	Oliver (7–3)	–	41,849	61–21	W5
83	July 4	@ Rangers	3–6	Bell (2–0)	**Moyer** (9–4)	Venafro (3)	49,103	61–22	L1
84	July 5	@ Rangers	2–14	Rogers (4–6)	**Stark** (1–1)	–	29,797	61–23	L2
85	July 6	@ Dodgers	13–0	**García** (10–1)	Brown (7–4)	–	53,072	62–23	W1
86	July 7	@ Dodgers	1–2	Herges (7–6)	**Paniagua** (3–2)	–	40,937	62–24	L1
87	July 8	@ Dodgers	9–2	**Sele** (10–1)	Williams (2–1)	–	40,511	63–24	W1
–	July 10	72nd All-Star Game	American League 4, National League 1 (Seattle; Safeco Field)						
88	July 12	Giants	4–3 (11)	**Rhodes** (6–0)	Boehringer (0–2)	–	45,696	64–24	W2
89	July 13	Giants	3–5	Ortiz (10–5)	**Moyer** (9–5)	Nen (27)	45,909	64–25	L1
90	July 14	Giants	3–2	**García** (11–1)	Estes (7–4)	**Sasaki** (30)	45,809	65–25	W1
91	July 15	Diamondbacks	8–0	**Sele** (11–1)	Ellis (6–4)	–	45,855	66–25	W2
92	July 16	Diamondbacks	3–5	Batista (5–5)	**Halama** (6–6)	Kim (7)	45,770	66–26	L1
93	July 17	Diamondbacks	6–1	**Abbott** (8–2)	Anderson (2–6)	–	45,894	67–26	W1
94	July 18	@ Royals	2–0	**Nelson** (4–1)	Hernández (2–3)	**Sasaki** (31)	15,818	68–26	W2
95	July 19	@ Royals	3–6	Wilson (4–1)	**García** (11–2)	–	21,566	68–27	L1
96	July 20	@ Twins	4–0	**Sele** (12–1)	Mays (11–7)	–	36,863	69–27	W1
97	July 21	@ Twins	6–3	**Halama** (7–6)	Johnson (0–1)	**Sasaki** (32)	33,501	70–27	W2
98	July 22	@ Twins	6–3	**Abbott** (9–2)	Lohse (3–2)	–	44,665	71–27	W3
99	July 23	@ Twins	3–2	**Moyer** (10–5)	Radke (10–7)	**Sasaki** (33)	31,220	72–27	W4
100	July 24	Royals	1–6	Wilson (5–1)	**García** (11–3)	–	45,119	72–28	L1
101	July 25	Royals	1–5	Byrd (2–4)	**Sele** (12–2)	–	45,265	72–29	L2
102	July 26	Royals	4–0	**Piñeiro** (1–0)	George (0–1)	–	44,519	73–29	W1
103	July 27	Twins	11–4	**Abbott** (10–2)	Lohse (3–3)	–	45,808	74–29	W2
104	July 28	Twins	5–1	**Moyer** (11–5)	Radke (10–8)	–	45,681	75–29	W3
105	July 29	Twins	10–2	**García** (12–3)	Milton (9–4)	–	45,780	76–29	W4
106	July 31	@ Tigers	2–4	Lima (3–2)	**Sele** (12–3)	Anderson (13)	30,022	76–30	L1

August: 20–9 (Home: 9–4; Away: 11–5)

#	Date	Opponent	Score	Win	Loss	Save	Attendance	Record	Streak
107	August 1	@ Tigers	7–1	**Abbott** (11–2)	Holt (7–9)	–	23,847	77–30	W1
108	August 2	@ Tigers	2–1	**Piñeiro** (2–0)	Pettyjohn (0–4)	**Sasaki** (34)	27,097	78–30	W2
109	August 3	@ Indians	2–1	**Moyer** (12–5)	Colón (10–8)	**Sasaki** (35)	42,580	79–30	W3
110	August 4	@ Indians	8–5	**García** (13–3)	Báez (2–1)	**Rhodes** (3)	42,440	80–30	W4
111	August 5	@ Indians	14–15 (11)	Rocker (3–4)	**Paniagua** (3–3)	–	42,494	80–31	L1
112	August 6	@ Indians	8–6	**Abbott** (12–2)	Nagy (4–5)	**Paniagua** (3)	42,058	81–31	W1
113	August 7	Blue Jays	5–4 (14)	**Halama** (8–6)	DeWitt (0–1)	–	45,636	82–31	W2
114	August 8	Blue Jays	12–4	**Moyer** (13–5)	Carpenter (7–10)	–	45,450	83–31	W3
115	August 9	Blue Jays	5–6	Quantrill (10–2)	**García** (13–4)	Koch (25)	45,670	83–32	L1
116	August 10	White Sox	6–8	Biddle (4–7)	**Sasaki** (0–4)	Foulke (28)	45,665	83–33	L2
117	August 11	White Sox	4–3	**Franklin** (5–1)	Foulke (3–7)	–	45,665	84–33	W1
118	August 12	White Sox	2–1	**Rhodes** (7–0)	Wells (6–9)	**Sasaki** (36)	45,765	85–33	W2
119	August 14	@ Red Sox	6–3	**Paniagua** (4–3)	Beck (5–4)	**Sasaki** (37)	33,790	86–33	W3
120	August 15	@ Red Sox	6–2	**García** (14–4)	Castillo (7–7)	–	33,186	87–33	W4
121	August 16	@ Red Sox	4–6	Garcés (4–1)	**Sele** (12–4)	Urbina (1)	33,548	87–34	L1
122	August 17	@ Yankees	0–4	Mussina (12–10)	**Abbott** (12–3)	Mendoza (5)	54,616	87–35	L2
123	August 18	@ Yankees	7–6	**Rhodes** (8–0)	Lilly (3–6)	**Sasaki** (38)	55,294	88–35	W1
124	August 19	@ Yankees	10–2	**Moyer** (14–5)	Pettitte (14–7)	–	54,339	89–35	W2
125	August 20	Tigers	1–4	Sparks (9–7)	**García** (14–5)	–	45,972	89–36	L1
126	August 21	Tigers	4–1	**Sele** (13–4)	Weaver (10–13)	**Sasaki** (39)	45,036	90–36	W1
127	August 22	Tigers	16–1	**Abbott** (13–3)	Lima (4–5)	–	45,814	91–36	W2
128	August 23	Tigers	5–1	**Piñeiro** (3–0)	Redman (2–5)	–	45,063	92–36	W3
129	August 24	Indians	4–1	**Moyer** (15–5)	Colón (10–10)	**Charlton** (1)	45,767	93–36	W4
130	August 25	Indians	3–2 (11)	**Halama** (9–6)	Rocker (3–6)	–	45,818	94–36	W5
131	August 26	Indians	3–4	Riske (1–0)	**Nelson** (4–2)	Wickman (24)	45,782	94–37	L1
132	August 28	@ Devil Rays	0–6	Wilson (6–8)	**Piñeiro** (3–1)	–	11,687	94–38	L2
133	August 29	@ Devil Rays	5–2	**Moyer** (16–5)	Sturtze (8–11)	–	12,792	95–38	W1
134	August 30	@ Devil Rays	4–0	**García** (15–5)	Rupe (5–11)	–	12,260	96–38	W2
135	August 31	@ Orioles	0–3	Maduro (3–4)	**Sele** (13–5)	–	37,084	96–39	L1

September: 15–6 (Home: 9–3; Away: 6–3)

#	Date	Opponent	Score	Win	Loss	Save	Attendance	Record	Streak
136	September 1	@ Orioles	6–4	**Abbott** (14–3)	Mercedes (7–16)	**Sasaki** (40)	45,668	97–39	W1
137	September 2	@ Orioles	1–0	**Piñeiro** (4–1)	Bauer (0–1)	**Sasaki** (41)	45,668	98–39	W2
138	September 3	Devil Rays	3–2 (11)	**Charlton** (3–1)	Yan (4–6)	–	45,728	99–39	W3
139	September 4	Devil Rays	3–8 (10)	Zambrano (6–2)	**Charlton** (3–2)	–	44,859	99–40	L1
140	September 5	Devil Rays	12–6	**Halama** (10–6)	Phelps (2–2)	–	44,720	100–40	W1
141	September 7	Orioles	10–1	**Abbott** (15–3)	Mercedes (7–17)	–	45,797	101–40	W2
142	September 8	Orioles	6–1	**Piñeiro** (5–1)	Bauer (0–2)	–	45,894	102–40	W3
143	September 9	Orioles	6–0	**Moyer** (17–5)	Towers (8–10)	–	45,344	103–40	W4
144	September 10	@ Angels	5–1	**García** (16–5)	Valdez (9–10)	–	20,311	104–40	W5
–	September 11	@ Angels	Postponed (September 11 attacks), rescheduled for October 2						
–	September 12	@ Angels	Postponed (September 11 attacks), rescheduled for October 3						
–	September 13	Rangers	Postponed (September 11 attacks), rescheduled for October 4						
–	September 14	Rangers	Postponed (September 11 attacks), rescheduled for October 5						
–	September 15	Rangers	Postponed (September 11 attacks), rescheduled for October 6						
–	September 16	Rangers	Postponed (September 11 attacks), rescheduled for October 7						
145	September 18	Angels	4–0	**García** (17–5)	Ortiz (12–9)	–	45,294	105–40	W6
146	September 19	Angels	5–0	**Moyer** (18–5)	Schoeneweis (10–10)	–	45,459	106–40	W7
147	September 20	Angels	3–6	Hasegawa (5–4)	**Halama** (10–7)	Percival (39)	44,768	106–41	L1
148	September 21	@ Athletics	1–5	Lidle (11–6)	**Abbott** (15–4)	Isringhausen (30)	30,387	106–42	L2
149	September 22	@ Athletics	2–11	Hiljus (4–0)	**Piñeiro** (5–2)	–	45,734	106–43	L3
150	September 23	@ Athletics	4–7	Mulder (20–7)	**García** (17–6)	Isringhausen (31)	38,628	106–44	L4
151	September 24	@ Rangers	9–3	**Moyer** (19–5)	Davis (10–9)	–	22,765	107–44	W1
152	September 25	@ Rangers	13–2	**Sele** (14–5)	Duchscherer (1–1)	–	27,781	108–44	W2
153	September 26	@ Rangers	7–5	**Abbott** (16–4)	Bell (5–5)	**Sasaki** (42)	24,712	109–44	W3
154	September 28	Athletics	5–3	**García** (18–6)	Mulder (20–8)	**Sasaki** (43)	45,695	110–44	W4
155	September 29	Athletics	4–8	Hiljus (5–0)	**Moyer** (19–6)	–	45,104	110–45	L1
156	September 30	Athletics	6–3	**Sele** (15–5)	Hudson (17–9)	–	45,674	111–45	W1

October: 5–1 (Home: 3–1; Away: 2–0)

#	Date	Opponent	Score	Win	Loss	Save	Attendance	Record	Streak
157	October 2	@ Angels	14–5	**Abbott** (17–4)	Washburn (11–10)	–	18,600	112–45	W2
158	October 3	@ Angels	4–3	**Charlton** (4–2)	Levine (8–10)	**Sasaki** (44)	18,503	113–45	W3
159	October 4	Rangers	16–1	**Tomko** (3–1)	Myette (4–5)	–	45,302	114–45	W4
160	October 5	Rangers	6–2	**Moyer** (20–6)	Helling (12–11)	–	45,333	115–45	W5
161	October 6	Rangers	1–0	**Piñeiro** (6–2)	Davis (11–10)	**Sasaki** (45)	45,607	116–45	W6
162	October 7	Rangers	3–4	Mahomes (7–6)	**Nelson** (4–3)	Zimmerman (28)	45,578	116–46	L1

Legend: = Win = Loss = Postponement
Bold = Mariners team member

== All-Star Game ==
The Mariners hosted the 2001 Major League Baseball All-Star Game on July 10, 2001 at Safeco Field. It was the second time the Mariners hosted the Midsummer Classic, and the first at Safeco Field. Eight Mariners were in the game, including four in the starting lineup. The game resulted in the American League defeating the National League by the final score of 4–1. This would be the final All-Star Game for Cal Ripken Jr. and Tony Gwynn.

== Player stats ==
=== Batting ===
==== Starters by position ====
Note: Pos = Position; G = Games played; AB = At bats; H = Hits; Avg. = Batting average; HR = Home runs; RBI = Runs batted in; SB = Stolen bases

Pos	Player	G	AB	H	Avg.	HR	RBI	SB
C	Dan Wilson	123	377	100	.265	10	42	3
1B	John Olerud	159	572	173	.302	21	95	3
2B	Bret Boone	158	623	206	.331	37	141	5
3B	David Bell	135	470	122	.260	15	64	2
SS	Carlos Guillén	140	456	118	.259	5	53	4
LF	Al Martin	100	283	68	.240	7	42	9
CF	Mike Cameron	150	540	144	.267	25	110	34
RF	Ichiro Suzuki	157	692	242	.350	8	69	56
DH	Edgar Martínez	132	470	144	.306	23	116	4

==== Other batters ====
Note: G = Games played; AB = At bats; H = Hits; Avg. = Batting average; HR = Home runs; RBI = Runs batted in; SB = Stolen bases

Player	G	AB	H	Avg.	HR	RBI	SB
Mark McLemore	125	409	117	.286	5	57	39
Stan Javier	89	281	82	.292	4	33	11
Tom Lampkin	79	204	46	.225	5	22	1
Ed Sprague	45	94	28	.298	2	16	0
Charles Gipson	94	64	14	.219	0	5	1
Jay Buhner	19	45	10	.222	2	5	0
Ramón Vázquez	17	35	8	.229	0	4	0
Anthony Sanders	9	17	3	.176	0	2	0
Gene Kingsale	10	15	5	.333	0	1	2
Pat Borders	5	6	3	.500	0	0	0
Scott Podsednik	5	6	1	.167	0	3	0

=== Pitching ===
==== Starting pitchers ====
Note: G = Games pitched; GS = Games started; IP = Innings pitched; W = Wins; L = Losses; ERA = Earned run average; SO = Strikeouts

Player	G	GS	IP	W	L	ERA	SO
Freddy García	34	34	238.2	18	6	3.05	163
Aaron Sele	34	33	215.0	15	5	3.60	114
Jamie Moyer	33	33	209.2	20	6	3.43	119
Paul Abbott	28	27	163.0	17	4	4.25	118
John Halama	31	17	110.1	10	7	4.73	50

==== Other pitchers ====
Note: G = Games pitched; GS = Games started; IP = Innings pitched; W = Wins; L = Losses; ERA = Earned run average; SO = Strikeouts

Player	GP	GS	IP	W	L	ERA	SO
Joel Piñeiro	17	11	75.1	6	2	2.03	56
Brett Tomko	11	4	34.2	3	1	5.19	22
Denny Stark	4	3	14.2	1	1	9.20	10

==== Relief pitchers ====
Note: G = Games pitched; IP = Innings pitched; W = Wins; L = Losses; SV = Saves; SVO = Save opportunities; ERA = Earned run average; SO = Strikeouts

Player	G	IP	W	L	SV	SVO	ERA	SO
Kazuhiro Sasaki	69	66.2	0	4	45	52	3.24	62
Ryan Franklin	38	78.1	5	1	0	1	3.56	60
Arthur Rhodes	71	68.0	8	0	3	7	1.72	83
Jeff Nelson	69	65.1	4	3	4	5	2.76	88
Norm Charlton	44	47.2	4	2	1	2	3.02	48
José Paniagua	60	66.0	4	3	3	4	4.36	46
Brian Fuentes	10	11.2	1	1	0	1	4.63	10

== Postseason ==
=== Game log ===
2001 Postseason game log: 4–6 (Home: 2–3; Away: 2–3)
ALDS vs. Cleveland Indians: 3–2 (Home: 2–1; Away: 1–1)

#	Date	Opponent	Score	Win	Loss	Save	Attendance	Record
1	October 9	Indians	0–5	Colón (1–0)	**García** (0–1)	–	48,033	0–1
2	October 11	Indians	5–1	**Moyer** (1–0)	Finley (0–1)	–	48,052	1–1
3	October 13	@ Indians	2–17	Sabathia (1–0)	**Sele** (0–1)	–	45,069	1–2
4	October 14	@ Indians	6–2	**García** (1–1)	Colón (1–1)	–	45,025	2–2
5	October 15	Indians	3–1	**Moyer** (2–0)	Finley (0–2)	**Sasaki** (1)	47,867	3–2

ALCS vs. New York Yankees: 1–4 (Home: 0–2; Away: 1–2)

#	Date	Opponent	Score	Win	Loss	Save	Attendance	Record
1	October 17	Yankees	2–4	Pettitte (1–1)	**Sele** (0–2)	Rivera (3)	47,644	0–1
2	October 18	Yankees	2–3	Mussina (2–0)	**García** (1–2)	Rivera (4)	47,791	0–2
3	October 20	@ Yankees	14–3	**Moyer** (3–0)	Hernández (1–1)	–	56,517	1–2
4	October 21	@ Yankees	1–3	Rivera (1–0)	**Sasaki** (0–1)	–	56,375	1–3
5	October 22	@ Yankees	3–12	Pettitte (2–1)	**Sele** (0–3)	–	56,370	1–4

Legend: = Win = Loss = Postponement
Bold = Mariners team member

=== Postseason rosters ===
Playoff rosters
American League Division Series

- Pitchers: 48 Paul Abbott 37 Norm Charlton 34 Freddy García 54 John Halama 50 Jamie Moyer 43 Jeff Nelson 36 José Paniagua 53 Arthur Rhodes 22 Kazuhiro Sasaki 30 Aaron Sele
- Catchers: 17 Tom Lampkin 6 Dan Wilson
- Infielders: 25 David Bell 29 Bret Boone 5 John Olerud 10 Ed Sprague Jr. 13 Ramón Vázquez
- Outfielders: 19 Jay Buhner 44 Mike Cameron 1 Charles Gipson 28 Stan Javier 23 Al Martin 4 Mark McLemore 51 Ichiro Suzuki
- Designated hitter: 11 Edgar Martínez

American League Championship Series

- Pitchers: 48 Paul Abbott 37 Norm Charlton 34 Freddy García 54 John Halama 50 Jamie Moyer 43 Jeff Nelson 36 José Paniagua 38 Joel Piñeiro 53 Arthur Rhodes 22 Kazuhiro Sasaki 30 Aaron Sele
- Catchers: 17 Tom Lampkin 6 Dan Wilson
- Infielders: 25 David Bell 29 Bret Boone 8 Carlos Guillén 5 John Olerud
- Outfielders: 19 Jay Buhner 44 Mike Cameron 1 Charles Gipson 28 Stan Javier 23 Al Martin 4 Mark McLemore 51 Ichiro Suzuki
- Designated hitter: 11 Edgar Martínez

== Awards and records ==
- Bret Boone, Most RBIs in one season by an American League Second Baseman (141)
- Ichiro Suzuki, American League Most Valuable Player
- Ichiro Suzuki, American League Rookie of the Year
- Ichiro Suzuki, American League Batting Champion
- Ichiro Suzuki, American League Stolen Base Leader
- Freddy García, American League ERA Leader
- Lou Piniella, Manager of the Year

All-Star Game

- John Olerud, first base, starter
- Bret Boone, second base, starter
- Ichiro Suzuki, outfield, starter
- Edgar Martínez, designated hitter, starter
- Mike Cameron, outfield, reserve
- Freddy García, pitcher, reserve
- Jeff Nelson, pitcher, reserve
- Kazuhiro Sasaki, pitcher, reserve

== Farm system ==
Level	Team	League	Manager
AAA	Tacoma Rainiers	Pacific Coast League	Dan Rohn
AA	San Antonio Missions	Texas League	Dave Brundage
A	San Bernardino Stampede	California League	Daren Brown
A	Wisconsin Timber Rattlers	Midwest League	Gary Thurman
A-Short Season	Everett AquaSox	Northwest League	Terry Pollreisz
Rookie	AZL Mariners	Arizona League	Omer Muñoz

LEAGUE CO-CHAMPIONS: Tacoma

== Major League Baseball draft ==
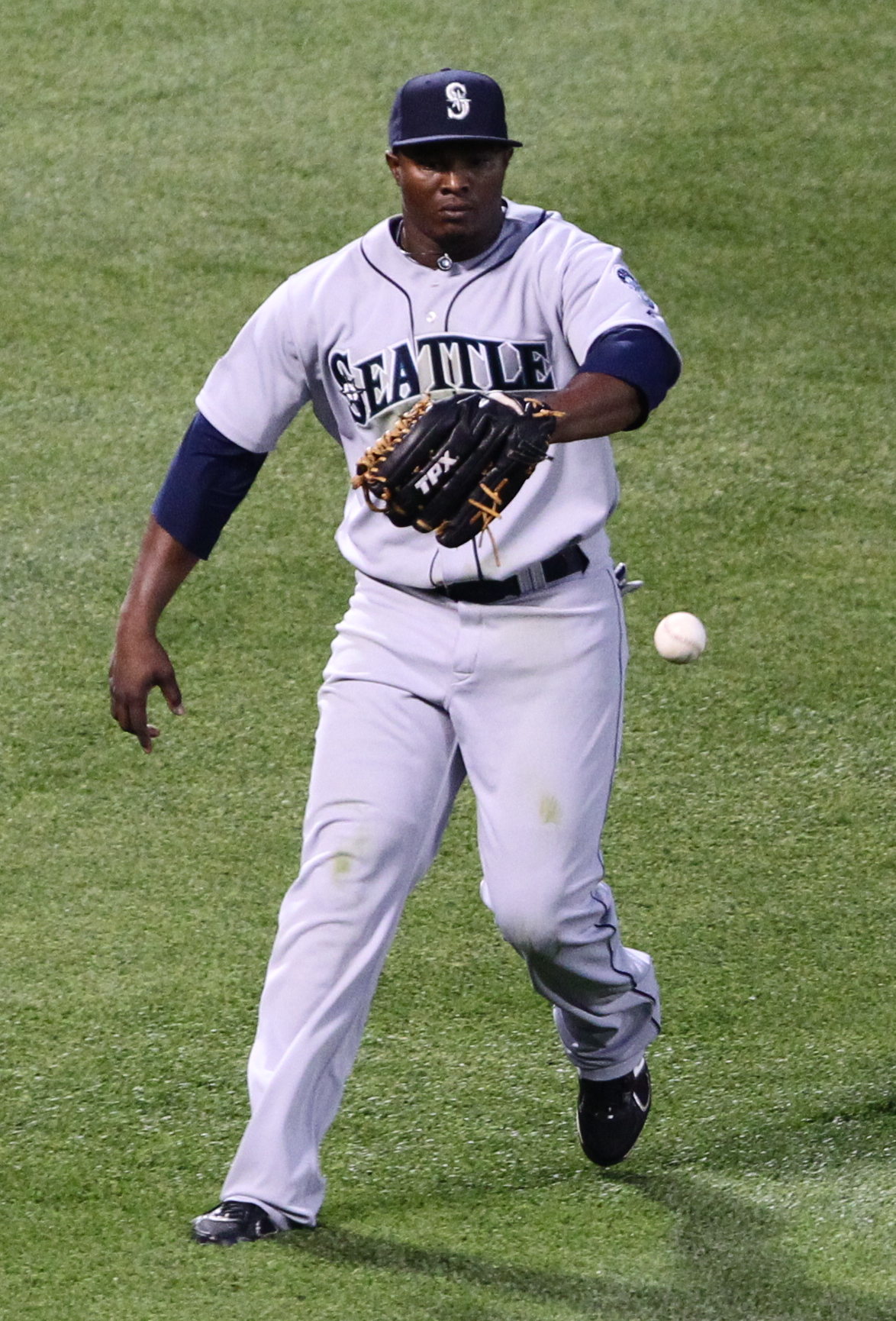
2001 Seattle Mariners draft picks
Mike Wilson (pictured) was a Mariners second round pick in 2001.
Information
**Owner**	Nintendo of America
**General Manager(s)**	Pat Gillick
**Manager(s)**	Lou Piniella
**First pick**	Michael Garciaparra
**Draft positions**	23rd
**Number of selections**	52
Links
**Results**	Baseball-Reference
**Official Site**	The Official Site of the Seattle Mariners
**Years**	2000 • 2001 • 2002

The following is a list of 2001 Seattle Mariners draft picks. The Mariners took part in the June regular draft, also known as the Rule 4 draft. The Mariners made 52 selections in the 2001 draft, the first being shortstop Michael Garciaparra in the first round. In all, the Mariners selected 23 pitchers, 13 outfielders, 7 catchers, 5 shortstops, 2 third basemen, 1 first baseman, and 1 second baseman.

=== Draft ===
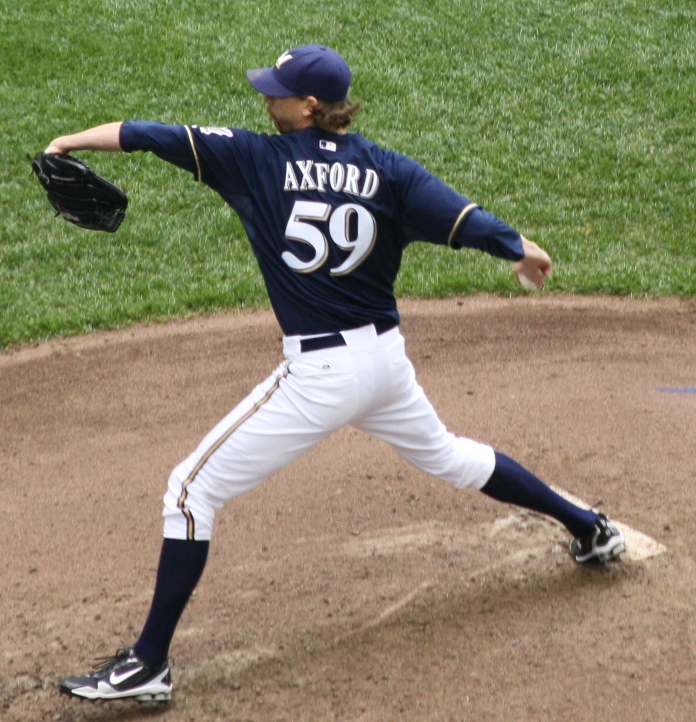
The Mariners selected John Axford in the seventh round of the 2001 draft.

=== Key ===
Round (Pick)	Indicates the round and pick the player was drafted
Position	Indicates the secondary/collegiate position at which the player was drafted, rather than the professional position the player may have gone on to play
**Bold**	Indicates the player signed with the Mariners
Italics	Indicates the player did not sign with the Mariners
*	Indicates the player made an appearance in Major League Baseball

=== Table ===
Round (Pick)	Name	Position	School	Source
1 (36)	**Michael Garciaparra**	Shortstop	Don Bosco High School	
2 (49)	**René Rivera**	Catcher	Papa Juan High School	
2 (67)	**Mike Wilson**	Outfielder	Booker T. Washington High School	
3 (80)	**Lazaro Abreu**	Catcher	Miami Southridge High School	
3 (99)	**Tim Merritt**	Shortstop	University of South Alabama	
4 (129)	**Bobby Livingston**	Left-handed pitcher	Trinity Christian High School	
5 (159)	**John Cole**	Second baseman	University of Nebraska–Lincoln	
6 (189)	**Justin Ockerman**	Right-handed pitcher	Garden City High School	
7 (219)	John Axford	Right-handed pitcher	Assumption College School	
8 (249)	**Jeff Ellena**	Shortstop	Cal Poly Pomona	
9 (279)	**Justin Blood**	Left-handed pitcher	Franklin Pierce College	
10 (309)	**Beau Hintz**	Left-handed pitcher	Fresno State University	
11 (339)	**Josh Ellison**	Outfielder	Westminster Academy	
12 (369)	**Mike Hrynio**	Third baseman	Dover High School	
13 (399)	**Jason Van Meetren**	Outfielder	Stanford University	
14 (429)	**Blake Woods**	Shortstop	Grand Canyon University	
15 (459)	**Chris Colton**	Outfielder	Newnan High School	
16 (489)	**Sean Peless**	First baseman	Edmonds Community College	
17 (519)	**Ramon Royce**	Right-handed pitcher	Lewis–Clark State College	
18 (549)	**John Williamson**	Outfielder	East Carolina University	
19 (579)	**Brian Sabourin**	Right-handed pitcher	Dakota Collegiate	
20 (609)	David Purcey	Left-handed pitcher	Trinity Christian Academy	
21 (639)	**Matt Ware**	Outfielder	Loyola High School	
22 (669)	Ladd Hall	Right-handed pitcher	Buena High School	
23 (699)	Aaron Braithwaite	Outfielder	Miami Killian High School	
24 (729)	Garry Bakker	Right-handed pitcher	Suffern High School	
25 (759)	**Eddie Olszta**	Catcher	Butler University	
26 (789)	**Jon Nelson**	Third baseman	Dixie State College	
27 (819)	**Tim Bausher**	Right-handed pitcher	Kutztown University	
28 (849)	**Wes Morrow**	Right-handed pitcher	Grayson County College	
29 (879)	Kyle Aselton	Left-handed pitcher	W. F. West High School	
30 (909)	**Billy Sadler**	Right-handed pitcher	Pensacola Junior College	
31 (939)	**Jason Rainey**	Outfielder	Texas Tech University	
32 (969)	**Bryan Vickers**	Catcher	Perrysburg High School	
33 (999)	**Tom Keefer**	Right-handed pitcher	Byng High School	
34 (1029)	Trevor Heid	Outfielder	Dixie State College	
35 (1059)	**Todd Holliday**	Pitcher	South Charleston High School	
36 (1089)	**Ben Hudson**	Catcher	Truett-McConnell College	
37 (1119)	**Miguel Martinez**	Left-handed pitcher	Miami Dade College	
38 (1149)	**Bobby Cramer**	Left-handed pitcher	Long Beach State University	
39 (1179)	Justin Ruchti	Catcher	Klein Forest High School	
40 (1209)	**Marquis Pettis**	Outfielder	Diablo Valley College	
41 (1238)	Kevin Guyette	Right-handed pitcher	Florida International University	
42 (1266)	**Ryan Brincat**	Outfielder	Mira Costa High School	
43 (1294)	Bradley Pahs	Catcher	Chesterton High School	
44 (1322)	**William Keyes**	Right-handed pitcher	St. James School	
45 (1350)	**Brandon Fusilier**	Outfielder	Navarro College	
46 (1378)	**Alan Gannaway**	Right-handed pitcher	Bessemer High School	
47 (1405)	Ethan Katz	Right-handed pitcher	University High School	
48 (1431)	Luis DeJesus	Shortstop	Teodoro Aguilar Mora High School	
49 (1456)	**Nicholaus Hamilton**	Outfielder	West Lowndes High School	
50 (1479)	**Brandon Espinosa**	Right-handed pitcher	Santa Ana College	
