= 2000 American League Championship Series =

31st edition of Major League Baseball's American League Championship Series

Team (Wins)	Managers	Season
New York Yankees (4)	Joe Torre	87–74 (.540), GA: 2 1/2
Seattle Mariners (2)	Lou Piniella	91–71 (.562), GB: 1/2
- Dates: October 10–17
- MVP: David Justice (New York)
- Umpires: John Hirschbeck, Ángel Hernández, Wally Bell, Mark Hirschbeck, Gerry Davis, Randy Marsh (Games 1–2), Fieldin Culbreth (Games 3–6)

Broadcast
- Television: NBC (United States); MLB International (International)
- TV announcers: Bob Costas and Joe Morgan (NBC); Gary Thorne and Ken Singleton (MLB International)
- Radio: ESPN
- Radio announcers: Dan Shulman and Buck Martinez
- ALDS: Seattle Mariners over Chicago White Sox (3–0); New York Yankees over Oakland Athletics (3–2)

The 2000 American League Championship Series (ALCS) was a best-of-seven playoff series in Major League Baseball’s (MLB) 2000 postseason pitting the two-time defending World Series champion and third-seeded New York Yankees against the fourth-seeded Seattle Mariners for the American League pennant. The Series began October 10 and ended on October 17. The Yankees held home-field advantage by virtue of winning their division.

The Yankees won the Series four games to two and went on to defeat the New York Mets in the World Series to win their third consecutive World Series championship, their fourth in five years, and 26th overall.

== Summary ==
=== New York Yankees vs. Seattle Mariners ===
New York won the series, 4–2.

Game	Date	Score	Location	Time	Attendance
1	October 10	Seattle Mariners – 2, New York Yankees – 0	Yankee Stadium (I)	3:45	54,481
2	October 11	Seattle Mariners – 1, New York Yankees – 7	Yankee Stadium (I)	3:36	55,317
3	October 13	New York Yankees – 8, Seattle Mariners – 2	Safeco Field	3:35	47,827
4	October 14	New York Yankees – 5, Seattle Mariners – 0	Safeco Field	2:59	47,803
5	October 15	New York Yankees – 2, Seattle Mariners – 6	Safeco Field	4:14	47,802
6	October 17	Seattle Mariners – 7, New York Yankees – 9	Yankee Stadium (I)	4:03	56,598

== Game summaries ==
=== Game 1 ===
October 10, 2000 8:12 pm (EDT) at Yankee Stadium (I) in Bronx, New York 47 °F (8 °C), clear
Team	1	2	3	4	5	6	7	8	9	R	H	E
Seattle	0	0	0	0	1	1	0	0	0	2	5	0
New York	0	0	0	0	0	0	0	0	0	0	6	1
WP: Freddy García (1–0) LP: Denny Neagle (0–1) Sv: Kazuhiro Sasaki (1); Home runs: SEA: Alex Rodriguez (1); NYY: None; Attendance: 54,481; Boxscore

The opener at Yankee Stadium on a cool night was a pitchers' duel between Freddy García and Denny Neagle, and the game was scoreless through four innings. In the top of the fifth, Mark McLemore got Seattle's first hit, a two-out ground-rule double lined down the left field line, then scored on a Rickey Henderson single slapped to right field. Alex Rodriguez led off the sixth inning with a home run high off the left field foul pole's screen to give the Mariners another. In the bottom half, Chuck Knoblauch led off with a double and Derek Jeter walked; Paul O'Neill and Bernie Williams struck out, then David Justice flew out deep to center to end the threat. The Yankees outhit the Mariners by one, but could not score off García (6 2/3 innings) and relievers José Paniagua, Arthur Rhodes, and Kazuhiro Sasaki; Seattle took the opener with a 2–0 shutout.

=== Game 2 ===
October 11, 2000 4:09 pm (EDT) at Yankee Stadium (I) in Bronx, New York 65 °F (18 °C), sunny
Team	1	2	3	4	5	6	7	8	9	R	H	E
Seattle	0	0	1	0	0	0	0	0	0	1	7	2
New York	0	0	0	0	0	0	0	7	X	7	14	0
WP: Orlando Hernández (1–0) LP: Arthur Rhodes (0–1); Home runs: SEA: None; NYY: Derek Jeter (1); Attendance: 55,317; Boxscore

Game 2 started just after 4 pm EDT, and the sun was difficult in the outfield for the first three innings. The Yankees' offense was again dead silent, this time against Mariners starter John Halama and reliever José Paniagua. In the first, New York loaded the bases (without a hit) and no outs, but could not score. Bernie Williams' ground ball went just inches and Mariners catcher Dan Wilson grabbed it, stepped on home, and threw to first for the double play; Tino Martinez then grounded out to second. In the top of the second, Seattle threatened with a leadoff walk by Edgar Martínez followed by a lunging single to center by John Olerud. Al Martin flew out to deep right center and the two advanced. David Bell lined the ball back to Orlando Hernández, who doubled up Olerud at second to end the inning. Halama pitched six innings, and Paniagua pitched the seventh.

Hernández pitched eight innings and gave up just one run, a Stan Javier single in the third that scored Mike Cameron, who had walked with two outs and stole second, after nearly being picked off at first. Hernández gave up six hits, but was set to get the loss until the Yankees' offense exploded in the eighth against Arthur Rhodes and José Mesa. David Justice led off with a double and scored on a single by Williams to tie the game, New York's first run in 21 innings. Back-to-back singles by Martinez and Jorge Posada then gave New York a 2–1 lead. Paul O'Neill then hit a sacrifice fly to score another. Mesa replaced Rhodes for Seattle and gave up a single to Luis Sojo. Posada was caught diving back to third for the second out on a safety squeeze; José Vizcaíno then doubled to left center to score Sojo from first to make it 4–1 Yankees. Vizcaíno went to third on a passed ball, scored on a Chuck Knoblauch single up the middle, and Derek Jeter sliced a homer to right to make it 7–1. Up again, Justice fouled off several and flew out to center to end the lengthy inning. Closer Mariano Rivera pitched a scoreless ninth: Olerud sliced a ground-rule double to lead off, but three ground balls ended the game; the series was tied at 1–1 and headed to Seattle.

=== Game 3 ===
October 13, 2000 5:12 pm (PDT) at Safeco Field in Seattle, Washington 72 °F (22 °C), roof closed
Team	1	2	3	4	5	6	7	8	9	R	H	E
New York	0	2	1	0	0	1	0	0	4	8	13	0
Seattle	1	0	0	0	1	0	0	0	0	2	10	1
WP: Andy Pettitte (1–0) LP: Aaron Sele (0–1) Sv: Mariano Rivera (1); Home runs: NYY: Bernie Williams (1), Tino Martinez (1); SEA: None; Attendance: 47,827; Boxscore

The Mariners struck first in Game 3 on three consecutive singles in the first, the last of which by Edgar Martínez off Andy Pettitte scored Mike Cameron from second. The Yankees responded with back-to-back home runs from Bernie Williams and Tino Martinez to lead off the second off Aaron Sele. The M's threatened with two on and no outs, but could not score. New York extended their lead to 3–1 in the third when Derek Jeter, who reached on a fielder's choice to avoid an inning-ending double play, scored on a double to left-center by David Justice.

Seattle closed the deficit to one in the fifth when Rickey Henderson doubled to right-center and scored on a jammed single over shortstop from Cameron, but Alex Rodriguez flew high to left and Martínez grounded to shortstop (fielder's choice) to end the inning. The Yankees got that run right back in the sixth as Williams singled up the middle with one out and Martinez dribbled an infield single. Jorge Posada flew out deep to right and Williams advanced to third, then scored on Paul O'Neill's single to right; Luis Sojo flew to right for the third out. In the bottom of the eighth, Rodriguez singled and stole second, but Martínez struck out, and closer Mariano Rivera relieved Jeff Nelson. Pinch hitter Stan Javier grounded to third and John Olerud went to a full count then flew out to left.

New York broke the game open with four runs in the ninth. O'Neill grounded out to first and Sojo singled up the middle; José Vizcaino entered as a pinch runner and stole second. Scott Brosius walked, and Vizcaino advanced to third on a wild pitch. Chuck Knoblauch hit an RBI single up the middle off of Brett Tomko, who then walked Jeter (after a lengthy at-bat) to load the bases. Lefthander Robert Ramsay relieved Tomko and allowed a two-run single to right by Justice and a sacrifice fly to left by Williams to make it 8–2. Rivera retired the Mariners in order for a five-out save as the Yankees went up 2−1 in the series.

=== Game 4 ===
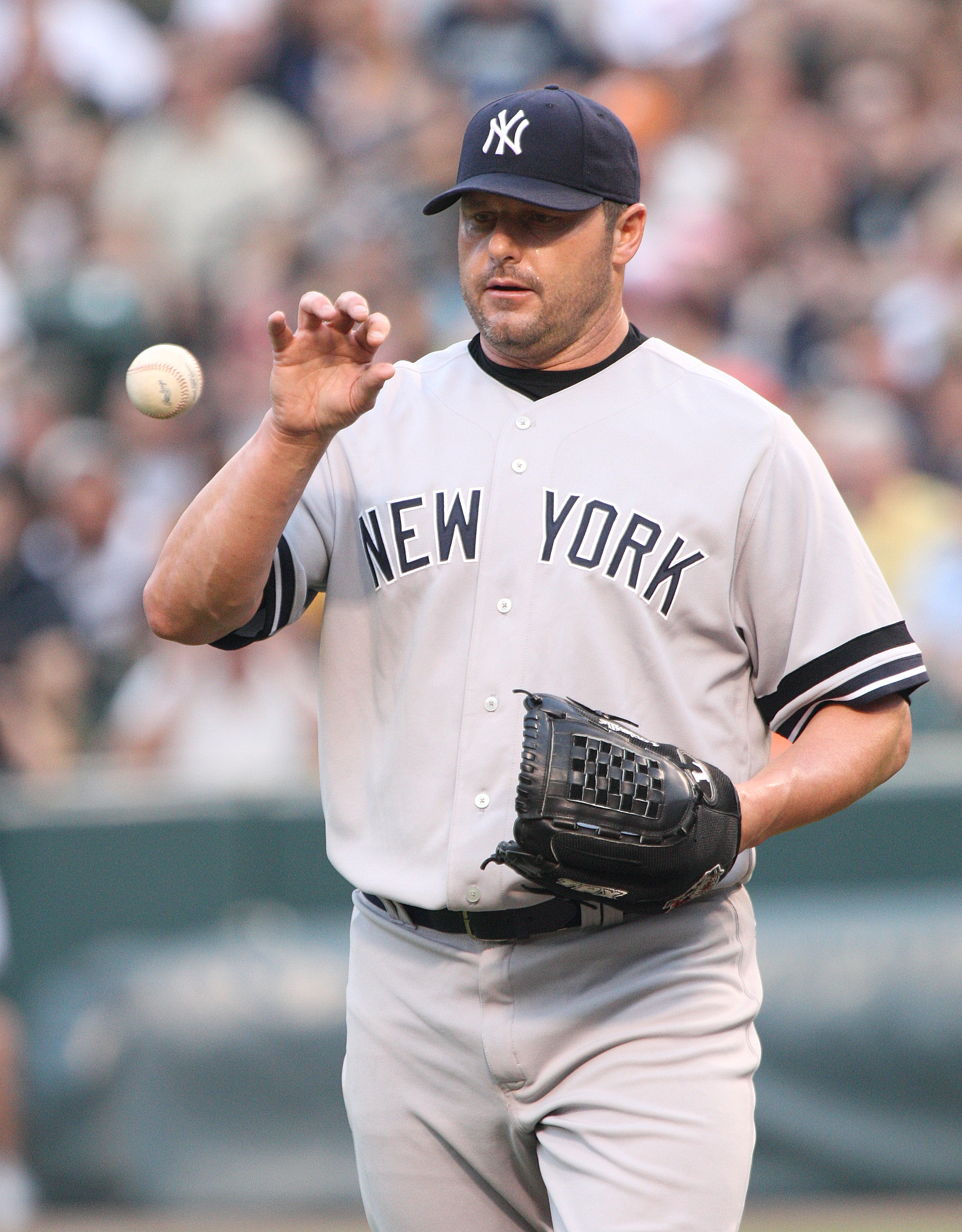
Roger Clemens had 15 strikeouts while holding Seattle to one hit in Game 4.

October 14, 2000 4:42 pm (PDT) at Safeco Field in Seattle, Washington 56 °F (13 °C), roof open; sunny
Team	1	2	3	4	5	6	7	8	9	R	H	E
New York	0	0	0	0	3	0	0	2	0	5	5	0
Seattle	0	0	0	0	0	0	0	0	0	0	1	0
WP: Roger Clemens (1–0) LP: Paul Abbott (0–1); Home runs: NYY: Derek Jeter (2), David Justice (1); SEA: None; Attendance: 47,803; Boxscore

In one of the most dominant pitching performances in postseason history, Yankees starter Roger Clemens struck out 15 batters in a complete game one-hit shutout of the Mariners. Clemens carried a no-hitter into the seventh inning when Al Martin lined a leadoff double off first baseman Tino Martinez's glove for the Mariners' only hit of the game. Clemens got offensive support when Derek Jeter hit a three-run home run off Paul Abbott in the fifth and David Justice hit a two-run home run off José Mesa in the eighth after a leadoff walk to Jeter. The Yankees won 5–0 and were just one win away from the World Series.

Clemens' 15 strikeouts matched the ALCS record set by Mike Mussina in Game 3 in 1997. Fifteen strikeouts in a postseason game did not happen again until the 2019 ALDS, by Gerrit Cole of the Houston Astros.

=== Game 5 ===
October 15, 2000 1:09 pm (PDT) at Safeco Field in Seattle, Washington 46 °F (8 °C), roof open; overcast
Team	1	2	3	4	5	6	7	8	9	R	H	E
New York	0	0	0	2	0	0	0	0	0	2	8	0
Seattle	1	0	0	0	5	0	0	0	X	6	8	0
WP: Freddy García (2–0) LP: Denny Neagle (0–2); Home runs: NYY: None; SEA: Edgar Martínez (1), John Olerud (1); Attendance: 47,802; Boxscore

Facing elimination, the Mariners struck first in Game 5 on Sunday. After Rickey Henderson was caught looking, Yankee starter Denny Neagle walked three straight to load the bases in the bottom of the first; Mike Cameron scored on a sacrifice fly to right from John Olerud, then Jay Buhner struck out. The Yankees responded in the fourth when Tino Martinez doubled to right-center, Jorge Posada singled to left, and Paul O'Neill walked to load the bases with no outs. Luis Sojo hit a double to left-center off Freddy García that scored Martinez and Posada. Seattle escaped further damage as Scott Brosius flew out to third, Chuck Knoblauch struck out, and Derek Jeter grounded to shortstop.

Bernie Williams robbed Olerud of a home run in the bottom of the fourth, then hit a double to the wall in right center, where he stayed, as Martinez grounded to short, Posada walked, and O'Neill swung at a 3–0 pitch away and grounded into a fielder's choice to end the inning.

In the bottom of the fifth, Mark McLemore led off with a bunt single halfway to third, Henderson walked, and Cameron advanced them with a bunt down the first base line. Neagle was replaced with Jeff Nelson, who gave up a single to Alex Rodriguez through the hole to left that scored both runners for a 3–2 lead. With Rodriguez threatening to run at first, Edgar Martínez drove a 2–0 pitch over the center field wall and Olerud made it back-to-back on the next pitch with his own to right-center. With the Mariners up 6–2, Nelson was relieved by Jason Grimsley. Buhner singled down the first base line, David Bell popped out to center, and consecutive walks to Dan Wilson and McLemore loaded the bases; Dwight Gooden induced a soft infield fly from Henderson to end the inning.

Neither team scored afterwards, but in the seventh, Jeter led off with a walk and reliever José Paniagua was replaced by Arthur Rhodes. David Justice struck out, but Williams and Martinez walked to load the bases. With the tying run at the plate, Posada fanned and pinch hitter Glenallen Hill was caught looking. In the bottom of the inning, Olerud led off with a single, stole second, advanced to third on a ground ball, but was stranded. Rhodes struck out Sojo in the top of the eighth, but walked Brosius and was replaced by closer Kazuhiro Sasaki: Knoblauch fouled out to Olerud, Jeter lined a single to left, and Justice struck out. New York's David Cone retired the Mariners in order: McLemore and Raúl Ibañez both grounded out to second, while Cameron fouled out to Brosius. In the ninth, Sasaki hit Williams on an 0–2 count, who advanced to second on a wild pitch, then to third when Martinez grounded to second. Posada walked, pinch hitter Luis Polonia struck out, and Sojo flew to center, ending the game.

Neagle accounted for both New York losses in the series, as García defeated him twice. The Yankees left 15 runners on base in Game 5 and were 2 for 15 with runners in scoring position. The Seattle win forced a Game 6 at Yankee Stadium.

=== Game 6 ===
October 17, 2000 8:14 pm (EDT) at Yankee Stadium (I) in Bronx, New York 55 °F (13 °C), overcast, rain
Team	1	2	3	4	5	6	7	8	9	R	H	E
Seattle	2	0	0	2	0	0	0	3	0	7	10	0
New York	0	0	0	3	0	0	6	0	X	9	11	0
WP: Orlando Hernández (2–0) LP: José Paniagua (0–1); Home runs: SEA: Carlos Guillén (1), Alex Rodriguez (2); NYY: David Justice (2); Attendance: 56,598; Boxscore

With the New York Mets clinching the National League pennant the night before with a 7-0 victory over the St. Louis Cardinals, the Yankees now had an opportunity to guarantee the first Subway Series since 1956. A capacity crowd would fill Yankee Stadium in anticipation.

The Mariners again struck first in Game 6, taking a 2–0 lead in the first when Yankees starter Orlando Hernández walked Al Martin, then gave up back-to-back doubles to Alex Rodriguez and Edgar Martínez. Seattle made it 4–0 when Carlos Guillén hit a two-run home run in the fourth. The Yankees responded in the bottom of the inning when they loaded the bases before Jorge Posada hit a double off John Halama that scored David Justice and Bernie Williams. Posada then scored on a Paul O'Neill single to make it a one-run game. That ended Halama's night, and Brett Tomko then pitched the next 2 2/3 innings without any further scoring.

The score stayed 4–3 until the bottom of the seventh, when New York put runners on first and third with one out off José Paniagua, who was replaced with Arthur Rhodes. Rhodes gave up a three-run home run to David Justice to give the Yankees a 6–4 lead. The bases were then loaded up with a single, double, and intentional walk before O'Neill's single scored two. José Mesa relieved Rhodes and walked Luis Sojo to reload the bases and José Vizcaíno's sacrifice fly made it 9–4 Yankees. Alex Rodriguez led off the top of the eighth with a home run off Hernández. After walking Edgar Martínez, Hernández was replaced with Mariano Rivera, who gave up a double to John Olerud, then two outs later, another double to Mark McLemore that scored both Martinez and Olerud before striking out Jay Buhner to end the inning. Rivera then pitched a scoreless ninth as New York won 9–7 and advance to the World Series against the cross-town Mets.

== Composite box ==
2000 ALCS (4–2): New York Yankees over Seattle Mariners

Team	1	2	3	4	5	6	7	8	9	R	H	E
New York Yankees	0	2	1	5	3	1	6	9	4	31	57	1
Seattle Mariners	4	0	1	2	7	1	0	3	0	18	41	3
Total attendance: 309,828 Average attendance: 51,638

== Television coverage ==
On September 26, 2000, NBC declined to renew its broadcast agreement with Major League Baseball. After 50 seasons — 1947–1989 and 1994–2000 — Game 6 was the last Major League Baseball game that NBC would televise for the next 22 years. Major League Baseball coverage would eventually return to NBC Sports in 2022 via a deal with their streaming service Peacock to broadcast games on Sunday afternoons. In Houston, due to the coverage of the 2000 Presidential Debate, KPRC-TV elected to carry NBC News' coverage of the debate while KNWS-TV carried NBC's final baseball game. In addition, NBC would not carry Major League Baseball postseason games until the 2026 season.

== Aftermath ==
Alex Rodriguez left the Mariners for the Texas Rangers after this series for a ten-year, $252 million deal. Three seasons later, Rodriguez was traded to the Yankees, where he remained until 2016.

The Yankees went on to beat the New York Mets in five games in the first Subway Series since 1956.

After a subpar performance in the 2000 ALCS from the bullpen, the Mariners signed the Yankees' set-up man Jeff Nelson in the off-season. With a league-best bullpen in 2001 and the addition of Japanese rookie Ichiro Suzuki, the Mariners returned to the ALCS the following season, after they broke the Yankees' American League record and tied the Major League record for regular season wins with 116. However, they fared worse in a rematch with the Yankees and were dispatched in five games.
