= Tom Lampkin =

American baseball player (born 1964)

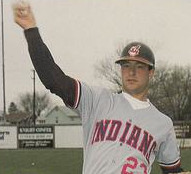
- Lampkin in 1988
- Catcher
- Born: March 4, 1964 (age 62); Cincinnati, Ohio, U.S.
- Batted: Left Threw: Right

MLB debut
- September 10, 1988, for the Cleveland Indians

Last MLB appearance
- September 28, 2002, for the San Diego Padres

MLB statistics
- Batting average: .235
- Home runs: 56
- Runs batted in: 236
- Stats at Baseball Reference

Teams
- Cleveland Indians (1988); San Diego Padres (1990–1992); Milwaukee Brewers (1993); San Francisco Giants (1995–1996); St. Louis Cardinals (1997–1998); Seattle Mariners (1999–2001); San Diego Padres (2002)

Thomas Michael Lampkin (born March 4, 1964) is an American former catcher in Major League Baseball who played in 1988, 1990–1993, and 1995–2002.

== Career ==
Lampkin was born in Cincinnati, Ohio to Mike and Shirley Lampkin and grew up in Clyde Hill, Washington. He was one of five children. Beginning at 15 years old in 1977, he worked as a clubhouse assistant for the Seattle Mariners at the Kingdome, even working the 1979 Major League Baseball All-Star Game and babysitting Dave Heaverlo's children. He attended high school at Bishop Blanchet High School and, after being undrafted out of high school, played college baseball at Edmonds Community College in Lynnwood, Washington and the University of Portland. He was selected in the eleventh round of the 1986 Major League Baseball draft by the Cleveland Indians.

Lampkin was assigned to the Batavia Trojans of the New York–Penn League to begin his professional career. He made his Major League debut with the Indians on September 10, 1988 as a defensive replacement for Terry Francona (who had pinch hit for catcher Ron Tingley). He appeared in only four games for the Indians that season and none the following season, before being traded to the San Diego Padres for Alex Cole on July 11, 1990. Lampkin spent parts of three seasons with the Padres before moving to the Milwaukee Brewers. In his one season in Milwaukee in 1993, he received more Major League plate appearances than in his prior four Major League seasons combined. However, he was granted free agency following the season and, despite being signed by the San Francisco Giants in January 1994, did not appear in another Major League game until 1995. With the Giants in 1996, Lampkin for the first time in his career led his team in games played at catcher. He also led the National League by throwing out 51.5% of all would-be base stealers. Following the season, he was traded to the St. Louis Cardinals where, in two seasons, he saw the most playing time of his career as a backup to Mike DiFelice and Eli Marrero respectively.

Prior to the 1999 season, the Mariners signed Lampkin to a two-year contract for $1.55 million to back up Dan Wilson. In Seattle, Lampkin worked with baserunning coach Vince Coleman not on his own baserunning but to learn to "anticipate what the good base-stealers do." Although injuries limited his playing time in 2000, he played well enough in his first two seasons to earn a $1.2 million contract for the 2001 season. The 2001 Seattle Mariners tied a Major League record for the winningest season in history and Lampkin saw his first postseason action, getting a hit in the 2001 American League Championship Series.

On December 11, 2001, the Mariners traded Lampkin to San Diego with Brett Tomko and Ramón Vázquez for Alex Arias, Ben Davis and Wascar Serrano. Lampkin was disappointed by the trade and expressed at the time that he had hoped to finish his career in Seattle. Lampkin was the starting catcher for the Padres during the 2002 season but retired that offseason.

== Personal life ==
As of 2002, Lampkin and his wife, Lori Kath, had three children, Jennifer, Stephanie and Thomas Michael. As of 2018, he lived in Vancouver, Washington. He was the head baseball coach at Union High School in Camas, Washington.
