= 2001 American League Championship Series =

32nd edition of Major League Baseball's American League Championship Series

Team (Wins)	Managers	Season
New York Yankees (4)	Joe Torre	95–65 (.594), GA: 13 1/2
Seattle Mariners (1)	Lou Piniella	116–46 (.716), GA: 14
- Dates: October 17–22
- MVP: Andy Pettitte (New York)
- Umpires: Ed Montague, Wally Bell, Gary Cederstrom, Charlie Reliford, John Shulock, Tim Welke

Broadcast
- Television: Fox
- TV announcers: Thom Brennaman and Steve Lyons (Games 1–2); Joe Buck and Tim McCarver (Games 3–5)
- Radio: ESPN
- Radio announcers: Jon Miller and Joe Morgan
- ALDS: Seattle Mariners over Cleveland Indians (3–2); New York Yankees over Oakland Athletics (3–2)

The 2001 American League Championship Series (ALCS) was a best-of-seven playoff series in Major League Baseball’s 2001 postseason pitting the overall #1 seeded Seattle Mariners against the three-time defending World Series champion and second-seeded New York Yankees for the American League pennant. The Series began October 17 and ended on October 22. The Mariners held home-field advantage by virtue of having a better regular season record. This was a rematch of the 2000 ALCS, which the Yankees won in six games.

The series had additional poignancy, coming immediately after New York City was devastated by the September 11 attacks (the series was played in late October, due to Major League Baseball temporarily shutting down in the wake of the attacks).

Though the Mariners had won an American League record 116 regular season games (tying the major league record established by the 1906 Chicago Cubs (116–36 (.763)), the Yankees won the first two games in Seattle. Mariners' manager Lou Piniella, a former Yankee player and manager, guaranteed after Game 2 that the Mariners would win at least two of the next three games in New York to return the series to Seattle. Seattle won a blowout in Game 3 on the road, but lost a tight Game 4 after squandering a late lead. The Yankees closed out the best-of-seven series in New York with a 12–3 rout in Game 5 for their ALCS-era record fourth-straight league pennant.

The Yankees then attempted to win a fourth consecutive World Series title, but lost a close seventh game on the road to the Arizona Diamondbacks.

== Summary ==
=== Seattle Mariners vs. New York Yankees ===
New York won the series, 4–1.

Game	Date	Score	Location	Time	Attendance
1	October 17	New York Yankees – 4, Seattle Mariners – 2	Safeco Field	3:06	47,644
2	October 18	New York Yankees – 3, Seattle Mariners – 2	Safeco Field	3:25	47,791
3	October 20	Seattle Mariners – 14, New York Yankees – 3	Yankee Stadium (I)	3:49	56,517
4	October 21	Seattle Mariners – 1, New York Yankees – 3	Yankee Stadium (I)	3:24	56,375
5	October 22	Seattle Mariners – 3, New York Yankees – 12	Yankee Stadium (I)	3:18	56,370

== Game summaries ==
=== Game 1 ===
October 17, 2001 4:20 pm (PDT) at Safeco Field in Seattle, Washington 53 °F (12 °C), roof open; cloudy
Team	1	2	3	4	5	6	7	8	9	R	H	E
New York	0	1	0	2	0	0	0	0	1	4	9	0
Seattle	0	0	0	0	1	0	0	0	1	2	4	0
WP: Andy Pettitte (1–0) LP: Aaron Sele (0–1) Sv: Mariano Rivera (1); Home runs: NYY: Paul O'Neill (1); SEA: None; Attendance: 47,644; Boxscore

The starting date of October 17 was the latest ever for a League Championship Series (the regular season concluded on Sunday, October 7.) The Yankees took a 1–0 lead on a Chuck Knoblauch single that scored Jorge Posada in the second off Aaron Sele, then increased it to 3–0 on a Paul O'Neill two-run home run in the fourth. The Mariners got on the board on a John Olerud groundout that scored Edgar Martínez in the fifth off Andy Pettitte.

The score remained 3–1 until the ninth, when the Yankees increased their lead to 4–1 off Jose Paniagua on a David Justice single that scored Alfonso Soriano, who singled and stole second. The Mariners got that run back in the bottom of the inning when Mariano Rivera threw a wild pitch to Bret Boone that scored Ichiro Suzuki, who doubled with one out and went to third on another wild pitch, but Rivera retired Boone and Martínez to end the game.

=== Game 2 ===
October 18, 2001 5:20 pm (PDT) at Safeco Field in Seattle, Washington 72 °F (22 °C), roof closed
Team	1	2	3	4	5	6	7	8	9	R	H	E
New York	0	3	0	0	0	0	0	0	0	3	9	1
Seattle	0	0	0	2	0	0	0	0	0	2	6	0
WP: Mike Mussina (1–0) LP: Freddy García (0–1) Sv: Mariano Rivera (2); Home runs: NYY: None; SEA: Stan Javier (1); Attendance: 47,791; Boxscore

New York took a 2–0 lead in the second against Freddy García on a Scott Brosius double that scored Tino Martinez and Jorge Posada, who singled and walked, respectively. Brosius then scored on a Chuck Knoblauch single two batters later to make it 3–0 Yankees. The Mariners responded in the fourth on a two-run home run from Stan Javier off Mike Mussina after Mike Cameron was hit by a pitch to make it a one-run game. That ended the scoring and the Yankees took a 2–0 series lead back to The Bronx.

This was the most recent MLB postseason game played in Seattle until Game 3 of the 2022 ALDS.

=== Game 3 ===
October 20, 2001 4:20 pm (EDT) at Yankee Stadium (I) in Bronx, New York 69 °F (21 °C), sunny
Team	1	2	3	4	5	6	7	8	9	R	H	E
Seattle	0	0	0	0	2	7	2	1	2	14	15	0
New York	2	0	0	0	0	0	0	1	0	3	7	2
WP: Jamie Moyer (1–0) LP: Orlando Hernández (0–1); Home runs: SEA: John Olerud (1), Bret Boone (1), Jay Buhner (1); NYY: Bernie Williams (1); Attendance: 56,517; Boxscore

The Yankees jumped to a 2–0 lead in the first on a Bernie Williams two-run home run off Jamie Moyer after David Justice walked. But they did not score again until the eighth on a David Justice RBI single off Jose Paniagua. Orlando Hernández pitched four shutout innings before letting the Mariners load the bases on two walks and a single in the fifth. Bret Boone's single scored two to tie the game. Next inning, John Olerud's lead-off home run put the Mariners up 3−2, their first lead in the series. After allowing a single and walk, Hernández was relieved by Mike Stanton. An error allowed another run to score and put runners on second and third. After David Bell flied out, Ichiro Suzuki was intentionally walked to load the bases and Mark McLemore cleared them with a triple. Mark Wohlers relieved Stanton and gave up a two-run home run to Boone to make it 9−2.

In the seventh inning, with runners on first and third on a walk and error, Bell's single scored Cameron. Jay Witasick relieved Wohlers and, after getting two outs, allowed an RBI single to Boone. Next inning, Stan Javier hit a leadoff single, moved to third on two ground outs, and scored on Bell's single off Witasick. In the ninth, Witasick allowed a one-out home run to Jay Buhner, then a triple to Al Martin, who scored on Olerud's single. John Halama retired the Yankees in order to end the game, a 14–3 Mariners win which guaranteed a Game 5.

=== Game 4 ===
October 21, 2001 7:50 pm (EDT) at Yankee Stadium (I) in Bronx, New York 68 °F (20 °C), clear
Team	1	2	3	4	5	6	7	8	9	R	H	E
Seattle	0	0	0	0	0	0	0	1	0	1	2	0
New York	0	0	0	0	0	0	0	1	2	3	4	0
WP: Mariano Rivera (1–0) LP: Kazuhiro Sasaki (0–1); Home runs: SEA: Bret Boone (2); NYY: Bernie Williams (2), Alfonso Soriano (1); Attendance: 56,375; Boxscore

Starting pitchers Paul Abbott and Roger Clemens both lasted only five innings, but Game 4 remained scoreless until the top of the eighth. Seattle's Bret Boone hit a solo home run off reliever Ramiro Mendoza for the game's first tally, but the Yankees responded in the bottom of the inning with a Bernie Williams home run to right on a full count off Arthur Rhodes to tie the game. Mariano Rivera retired the side in order in the ninth, and Mariners closer Kazuhiro Sasaki got the first out, then allowed an infield single by Scott Brosius. The next hitter was rookie Alfonso Soriano, whose walk-off home run to right-center won the game, 3–1.

Through the seventh, each team had just one hit: John Olerud's leadoff single in the fourth off Clemens for the Mariners, and Tino Martinez's ground-rule double off Norm Charlton in the sixth for the Yankees. Abbott held New York hitless through the first five, but with eight walks; the Seattle bullpen issued two more walks while the Yankees gave up five total, four by Clemens. New York took a 3–1 series lead with another home game on Monday.

=== Game 5 ===
October 22, 2001 8:20 pm (EDT) at Yankee Stadium (I) in Bronx, New York 63 °F (17 °C), cloudy
Team	1	2	3	4	5	6	7	8	9	R	H	E
Seattle	0	0	0	0	0	0	3	0	0	3	9	1
New York	0	0	4	1	0	4	0	3	X	12	13	1
WP: Andy Pettitte (2–0) LP: Aaron Sele (0–2); Home runs: SEA: None; NYY: Bernie Williams (3), Paul O'Neill (2), Tino Martinez (1); Attendance: 56,370; Boxscore

In the bottom of the third inning, an error by Mariner third baseman David Bell allowed Scott Brosius to reach base. Alfonso Soriano then singled and both men advanced a base on Chuck Knoblauch's sacrifice bunt. Derek Jeter's sacrifice fly and David Justice's double scored a run each, then Bernie Williams capped the scoring with a two-run home run off Aaron Sele, all four runs unearned. Paul O'Neill homered in the fourth to put the Yankees up 5–0. In the sixth, Mariners reliever John Halama allowed three straight singles to load the bases with no outs. Joel Piñeiro relieved him and struck out Brosius, but then threw a wild pitch to Soriano to let all three runners move up. Soriano walked to reload the bases before Knoblauch's single, Jeter's walk, and Justice's single scored a run each, and New York led 9–0 with three innings remaining.

The Mariners got their only runs in the seventh when they loaded the bases on three singles with one out: a single by Bell scored two, followed by a single by Ichiro Suzuki scoring another off Andy Pettitte. In the bottom of the eighth, Tino Martinez hit a three-run home run off José Paniagua, and Mariano Rivera pitched a scoreless ninth, retiring Mike Cameron for the final out of the series, as the Yankees cruised to a 12–3 win and advanced to a fourth consecutive World Series.

== Composite linescore ==
2001 ALCS (4–1): New York Yankees over Seattle Mariners

Team	1	2	3	4	5	6	7	8	9	R	H	E
New York Yankees	2	4	4	3	0	4	0	5	3	25	42	4
Seattle Mariners	0	0	0	2	3	7	5	2	3	22	36	1
Total attendance: 264,697 Average attendance: 52,939

== Aftermath ==
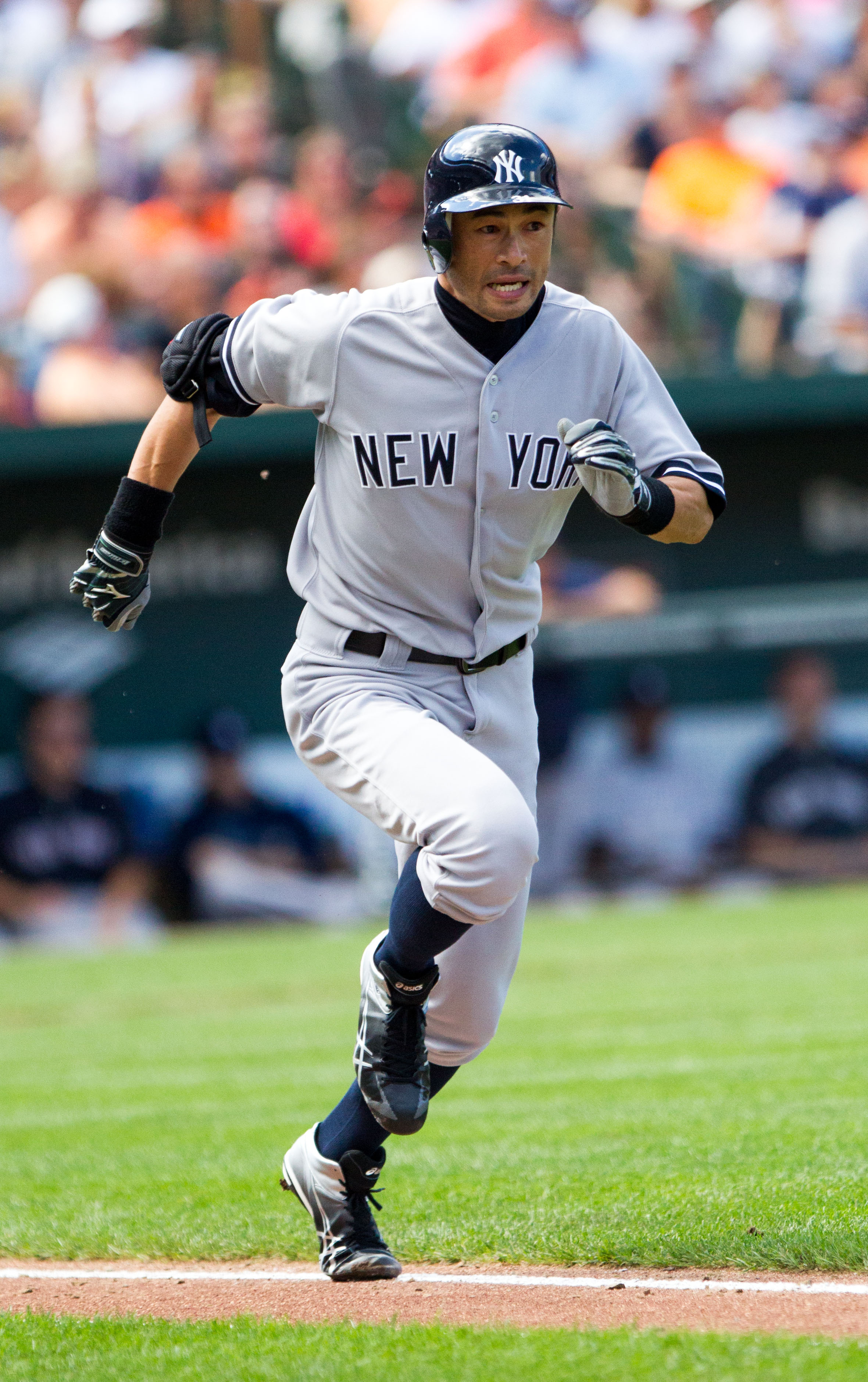
Ichiro Suzuki was traded to the Yankees later in his career in 2012.

The Yankees' streak of consecutive World Series wins ended at three, as they fell to the Arizona Diamondbacks in seven games. They made the World Series again in 2003, but lost to the underdog Florida Marlins, and did not win another World Series until 2009.

This was the end of the Mariners and Yankees' short-lived rivalry that started in the 1995 American League Division Series, which was considered one of the best non-World Series postseason series ever.

Ichiro would be traded from Seattle to the New York Yankees during the 2012 season, ending his eleven-year run with the team. Ichiro was a Yankee until 2014 before signing a series of one-year contracts with the Marlins until 2017. Ichiro ended his career with the Mariners in 2019 at the age of 45 and was inducted into the Seattle Mariners Hall of Fame in August 2022.

The Mariners' 116 wins in the regular season remain the most for an American League team and tied with the 1906 Cubs as the most in MLB. Despite their success under manager Piniella, the team went on a downward slide from which they have never recover from until 2022, the year they returned to the postseason for the first time since 2001.

MLB.com ranked the Yankees’ upset of the Mariners as the third biggest upset in postseason history.
