= Ben Davis (baseball) =

American baseball player (born 1977)

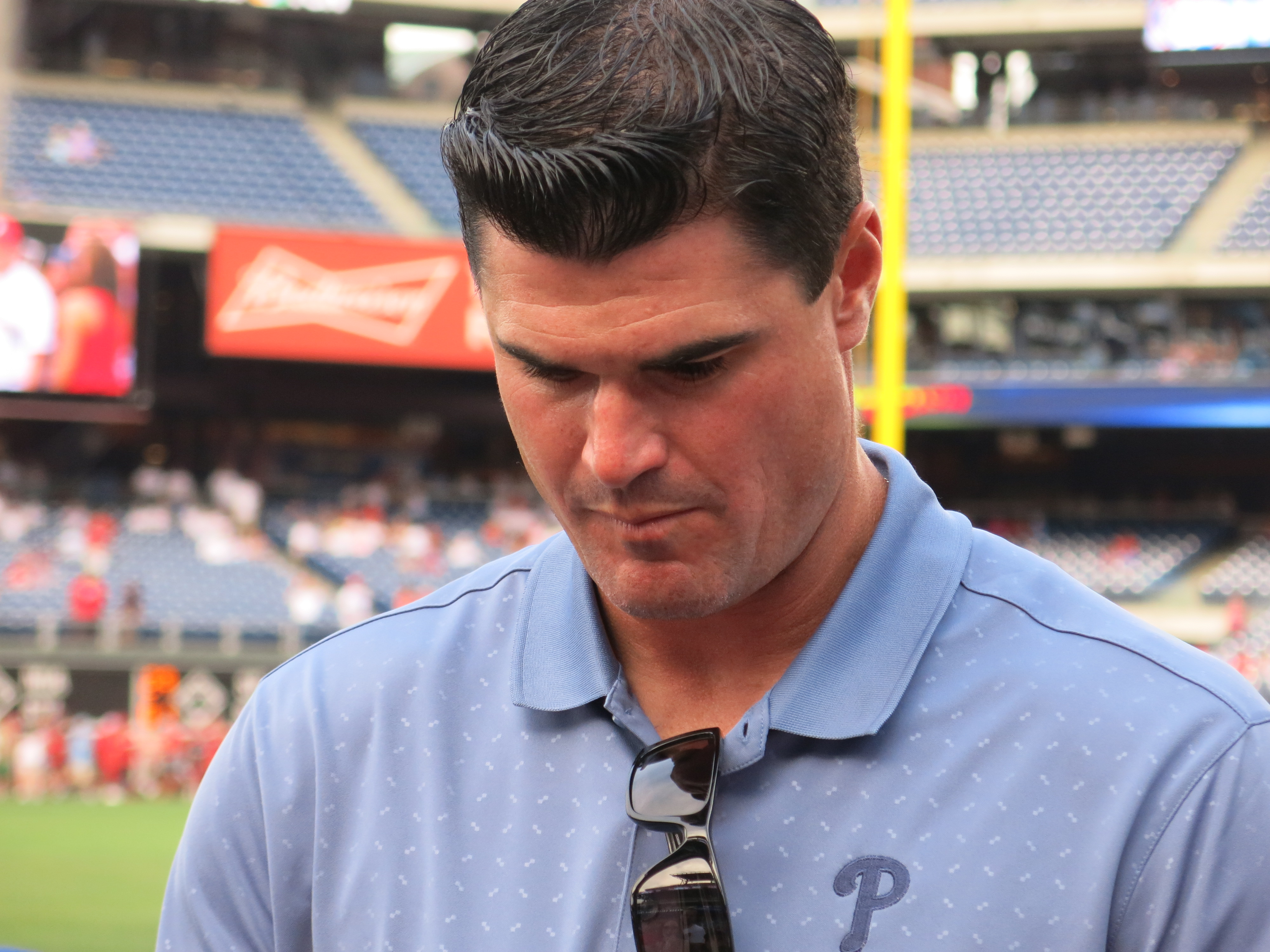
- Davis on July 16, 2016
- Catcher
- Born: March 10, 1977 (age 49); Chester, Pennsylvania, U.S.
- Batted: Switch Threw: Right

MLB debut
- September 25, 1998, for the San Diego Padres

Last MLB appearance
- October 3, 2004, for the Chicago White Sox

MLB statistics
- Batting average: .237
- Home runs: 38
- Runs batted in: 204
- Stats at Baseball Reference

Teams
- San Diego Padres (1998–2001); Seattle Mariners (2002–2004); Chicago White Sox (2004)
Medals
Men's baseball
Representing United States
World Junior Baseball Championship
Silver medal – second place	1994 Brandon	Team

Mark Christopher "Ben" Davis (born March 10, 1977), is an American former professional baseball player, who played in Major League Baseball (MLB) for the San Diego Padres, Seattle Mariners, and Chicago White Sox, between 1998 and 2004. Davis began his career as a promising catcher, but 2001 was the only season in which he played in more than half of his team's games. He was nicknamed "Big Ben", during his time with San Diego, because of his towering presence, standing 6 feet 4 inches (1.93 m) tall, weighing 195 pounds (88 kg).

After returning to the Minor Leagues for several seasons, Davis converted to pitching, in 2008. for parts of three seasons, before retiring in 2011. He currently works as a color commentator for the Philadelphia Phillies and lives with his wife, two sons, and two daughters in West Chester, Pennsylvania.

== High school career ==
Davis graduated in 1995 from Malvern Preparatory School in Malvern, Pennsylvania. As a senior, he batted .514, going 36 for 70, with six home runs, and 37 RBIs. Davis was ranked as the second-best prospect in the 1995 draft, by Baseball America; that same publication tabbed him as being the Best Defensive Catcher and the high school player closest to the majors. While at Malvern Prep, Davis also played on the basketball team, where he competed against fellow Main Line-prodigy Kobe Bryant, (then) of Lower Merion High School.

== Professional career ==
=== San Diego Padres ===
Davis was a first-round pick, second overall, in the 1995 Major League Baseball draft, by the San Diego Padres, out of Malvern Preparatory School. USA Today called him the best high school catcher since Dale Murphy, in 1974. Davis was named to the Pioneer League All-Star team, in his first professional season, with the Advanced-Rookie Idaho Falls Braves, in 1995.

In 1996, Davis was limited to designated hitter duties, for the first month of the season, with the Rancho Cucamonga Quakes, due to a sore right elbow. He threw out 25 of 98 attempted base-stealers. Davis also spent the 1997 season at Rancho Cucamonga, throwing out 59 of 159 attempted base-stealers.

The Padres purchased Davis' contract from the Double-A Mobile BayBears on September 19, 1998. He made his Major League debut, as a defensive replacement, on September 25, against the Arizona Diamondbacks. Davis reached on an error, in his first and only at-bat of the season. He was named to the Southern League All-Star team, that season, his first with Mobile. Davis threw out 47 of 83 attempted base-stealers.

Davis spent the majority of the 1999 season with the Padres. He started 71 of 93 games for San Diego, after being recalled, on June 23. Davis collected his first major league hit, on June 26, against the Colorado Rockies, a single off Mark Brownson. He posted his first career four-hit game, on September 15, against the Atlanta Braves, including a solo home run off John Smoltz.

Davis split the 2000 season between the Triple-A Las Vegas 51s and San Diego. He began the season with the Padres, appearing in seven games, before being optioned to Las Vegas, on April 20. Davis was recalled, on July 8. He was placed on the disabled list, in August, with a strained left oblique muscle.

In a game against the Arizona Diamondbacks on May 26, 2001, starting pitcher Curt Schilling took a perfect game into the eighth inning against the Padres, when, with one out and the Diamondbacks leading by a score of 2–0, Davis laid down a successful drag bunt single, to second baseman Jay Bell. After Davis reached base, many of the Diamondbacks' players shouted obscenities at him for supposedly breaking baseball's unwritten rules. After the game, Diamondbacks manager Bob Brenly called Davis's play "chickenshit".

=== Seattle Mariners ===
In December 2001, Davis was traded, along with Wascar Serrano and Alex Arias, to the Seattle Mariners, in exchange for Brett Tomko, Tom Lampkin, and Ramón Vázquez. This trade, in large, disappointed the Padres organization and fanbase, because of their continuing failures to produce "home-grown" talent. Davis was a highly regarded top prospect.

Davis had a .998 fielding percentage, in 77 games behind the plate, and threw out 44 percent of would be base-stealers, in 2002. He batted .300 with runners in scoring position, and was 6-for-11, with two home runs, with the bases loaded. Davis also hit .294, with six home runs, on the road, as opposed to .216, with one home run, at home. He batted .294, in the second half of the season, raising his average from .216, at the break, to .259, at the end of the season. All seven of Davis' home runs came from the left side of the plate. He hit his first American League (AL) home run, and first homer of the season, May 4, against the New York Yankees, at Yankee Stadium. Davis had a nine-game hitting streak, from May 17 to June 6, going 13-for-29, during that span. He hit his first triple of season, on August 4, against the Cleveland Indians.

Davis spent his second season with the Mariners in a platoon with fellow backstop Dan Wilson, in 2003. Davis appeared in 80 games, hitting .236, with six home runs, and 42 RBIs. He hit a go-ahead home run off Ricardo Rincón, to lead off the 11th inning, April 3, against the Oakland Athletics. Davis also tied a club record, with three doubles, on June 21, against his former team, the Padres.

=== Chicago White Sox ===
On June 27, 2004, Davis was once again traded, this time from the Mariners to the Chicago White Sox with Freddy García, in exchange for catcher Miguel Olivo, Mike Morse, and Jeremy Reed.

Davis appeared in just ten games with the Triple-A Charlotte Knights, before being placed on the disabled list, with a fractured finger, on his right hand. He also fought through a right elbow injury and missed the remainder of the season, after undergoing Tommy John surgery. Davis had batted .242, with one home run, and three RBIs, before the injury. He was released after the season.

=== New York Yankees ===
For the 2006 season, after signing with the New York Yankees, Davis played for the Columbus Clippers, their Triple-A affiliate and the Class-A Advanced Tampa Yankees. He went 3-for-16, with a double, home run, and two RBIs, for Tampa. Davis played in 48 games, with Columbus, hitting .222, with six doubles, four home runs, and 20 RBIs. On January 12, 2007, he was re-signed by the Yankees, and was invited to spring training.

=== Los Angeles Dodgers ===
Davis was released by the Yankees, on April 1, 2007. In May 2007, he joined the independent Camden Riversharks and played well enough that he was signed to a minor league contract by the Los Angeles Dodgers, in June. Davis was assigned to their Triple-A Las Vegas 51s, the team he had previously played for when they were San Diego's affiliate. He hit .331, with six doubles, three triples, three home runs, and 19 RBIs, in 36 games with Camden and played in 36 games with Las Vegas, batting .218, with four doubles, a home run, and 11 RBIs.

=== Baltimore Orioles ===
In January 2008, Davis was signed by the Baltimore Orioles, to a minor league contract, with an invitation to spring training. He did not make the team coming out of spring training and was assigned to the Double-A Bowie Baysox. Davis received a mid-season promotion to the Triple-A Norfolk Tides. In 24 games with Bowie, he hit .227, with six doubles, a triple, two home runs, and 13 RBIs; with Norfolk, Davis hit .172, with two doubles, a home run, and two RBIs, in 20 games. He was released, on June 14.

=== Cincinnati Reds ===
After being released by Baltimore, Davis returned to the River Sharks, as a pitcher, in an attempt to make a comeback that might once again result in a Major League hitch. In November 2008, he signed a minor league contract with the Cincinnati Reds, as a pitcher. Davis made his Reds' organization pitching debut on April 23, against the Charlotte Stone Crabs, tossing a scoreless inning, allowing no hits, and striking out one. He injured himself on May 17, and did not return that season. Davis' statistical totals for the 2009 season included a win-loss record of 0-1, with a 3.09 ERA, and four saves, in nine games.

=== Camden Riversharks ===
Davis pitched for the Camden Riversharks in 2010, going 5-11, with a 4.61 ERA, and 28 game appearances, 23 of which were games started. He announced his retirement from professional baseball, on April 16, 2011.

== Media career ==
Soon after his retirement, Davis began working for NBC Sports Philadelphia (formerly Comcast Sports Network/CSN), where he began work as an analyst for the Phillies Focus show, as well as Phillies Post Game Live. For the 2015 season, Davis joined the Phillies' broadcast team as an in-game analyst. He works alongside play-by-play announcer Tom McCarthy and at times color commentators John Kruk, Jimmy Rollins, Mike Schmidt, and Rubén Amaro Jr. Davis has also made regular appearances on 94 WIP Sports Radio as a co-host, in various time slots.
