= Garciaparra =

Garciaparra is a surname. Notable people with the surname include:

- Mia Hamm-Garciaparra (born 1972), American soccer player and wife of Nomar
- Michael Garciaparra (born 1983), American baseball player
- Nomar Garciaparra (born 1973), American baseball player

== See also ==
- García (surname)
