= List of best Major League Baseball season win–loss records =

Listed below are the Major League Baseball teams with the best season win–loss records, as determined by winning percentage (.700 or better).

== Season records ==
Legend

- NL = National League
- AL = American League
- AA = American Association

=== 1886–1900 ===
Season	Team	League	Wins	Losses	Pct.	Games played	Finish
1886	Chicago White Stockings	NL	90	34	.726	124	Lost 1886 World Series
1886	Detroit Wolverines	NL	87	36	.707	123	2nd place in National League
1897	Boston Beaneaters	NL	93	39	.705	132	Lost 1897 Temple Cup
1887	St. Louis Browns	AA	95	40	.704	135	Lost 1887 World Series

=== Modern era (1901–present) ===
Season	Team	League	Wins	Losses	Pct.	Games played	Finish
1906	Chicago Cubs	NL	116	36	.763	152	Lost 1906 World Series
1902	Pittsburgh Pirates	NL	103	36	.741	139	National League Champions
1909	Pittsburgh Pirates	NL	110	42	.724	152	Won 1909 World Series
1954	Cleveland Indians	AL	111	43	.721	154	Lost 1954 World Series
2020*	Los Angeles Dodgers	NL	43	17	.717	60	Won 2020 World Series
2001	Seattle Mariners	AL	116	46	.716	162	Lost 2001 ALCS
1927	New York Yankees	AL	110	44	.714	154	Won 1927 World Series
1907	Chicago Cubs	NL	107	45	.704	152	Won 1907 World Series
1931	Philadelphia Athletics	AL	107	45	.704	152	Lost 1931 World Series
1998	New York Yankees	AL	114	48	.704	162	Won 1998 World Series
1939	New York Yankees	AL	106	45	.702	152	Won 1939 World Series

*- Due to the COVID-19 pandemic, the season was shortened to 60 games.

== Pre-1886 teams ==
With shorter schedules (fewer than 100 games before 1884), it was more common for teams to finish with .700 or better winning percentages, as there was less of the evening-out effect of a longer season, and some seasons had multiple teams, with three in 1884 (between the three leagues that year) and in 1885.

In the list below (minimum 15 games played), six teams finished with better overall winning percentages than the 1906 Cubs, three being in the early years of the National league, and the other three in leagues whose status as "major" is questionable: two in the National Association, whose status as a major league has long been disputed, and the other in the Union Association, which is conventionally listed as a major league, but this has been questioned due to the league's overall lack of playing talent and poor organizational structure.

In addition, contemporary baseball guides did not consider the Union Association to be a major league: the earliest record referencing the Union Association as a major league dates to 1922.

Legend

- NA = National Association
- NL = National League
- AA = American Association
- UA = Union Association

Season	Team	League	Wins	Losses	Pct.	Games played	Finish
1875	Boston Red Stockings	NA	71	8	.899	79	National Association Champions
1884	St. Louis Maroons	UA	94	19	.832	113	Union Association Champions
1872	Boston Red Stockings	NA	39	8	.830	47	National Association Champions
1880	Chicago White Stockings	NL	67	17	.798	84	National League Champions
1876	Chicago White Stockings	NL	52	14	.788	66	National League Champions
1885	Chicago White Stockings	NL	87	25	.777	112	Tied 1885 World Series
1885	New York Giants	NL	85	27	.759	112	2nd National League
1871	Philadelphia Athletics	NA	21	7	.750	28	National Association Champions
1884	Providence Grays	NL	84	28	.750	112	Won 1884 World Series
1874	Boston Red Stockings	NA	52	18	.743	70	National Association Champions
1873	Boston Red Stockings	NA	43	16	.729	59	National Association Champions
1875	Philadelphia Athletics	NA	53	20	.726	73	2nd National Association
1885	St. Louis Browns	AA	79	33	.705	112	Tied 1885 World Series
1876	St. Louis Brown Stockings	NL	45	19	.703	64	3rd National League
1879	Providence Grays	NL	59	25	.702	84	National League Champions
1884	New York Metropolitans	AA	75	32	.701	107	Lost 1884 World Series
1877	Boston Red Caps	NL	42	18	.700	60	National League Champions

The all-time best single season record belongs to the Cincinnati Red Stockings, who posted baseball's only perfect record at 67–0 (57–0 against National Association of Base Ball Players clubs) in 1869, prior to Major League baseball. Their record stretched to 81–0 across the 1870 season before losing 8–7 in eleven innings to the Brooklyn Atlantics in Brooklyn on June 14.

== See also ==
- List of worst Major League Baseball season win–loss records
- List of Major League Baseball 100 win seasons
