= Ramón Vázquez =

Puerto Rican baseball player and coach (born 1976)

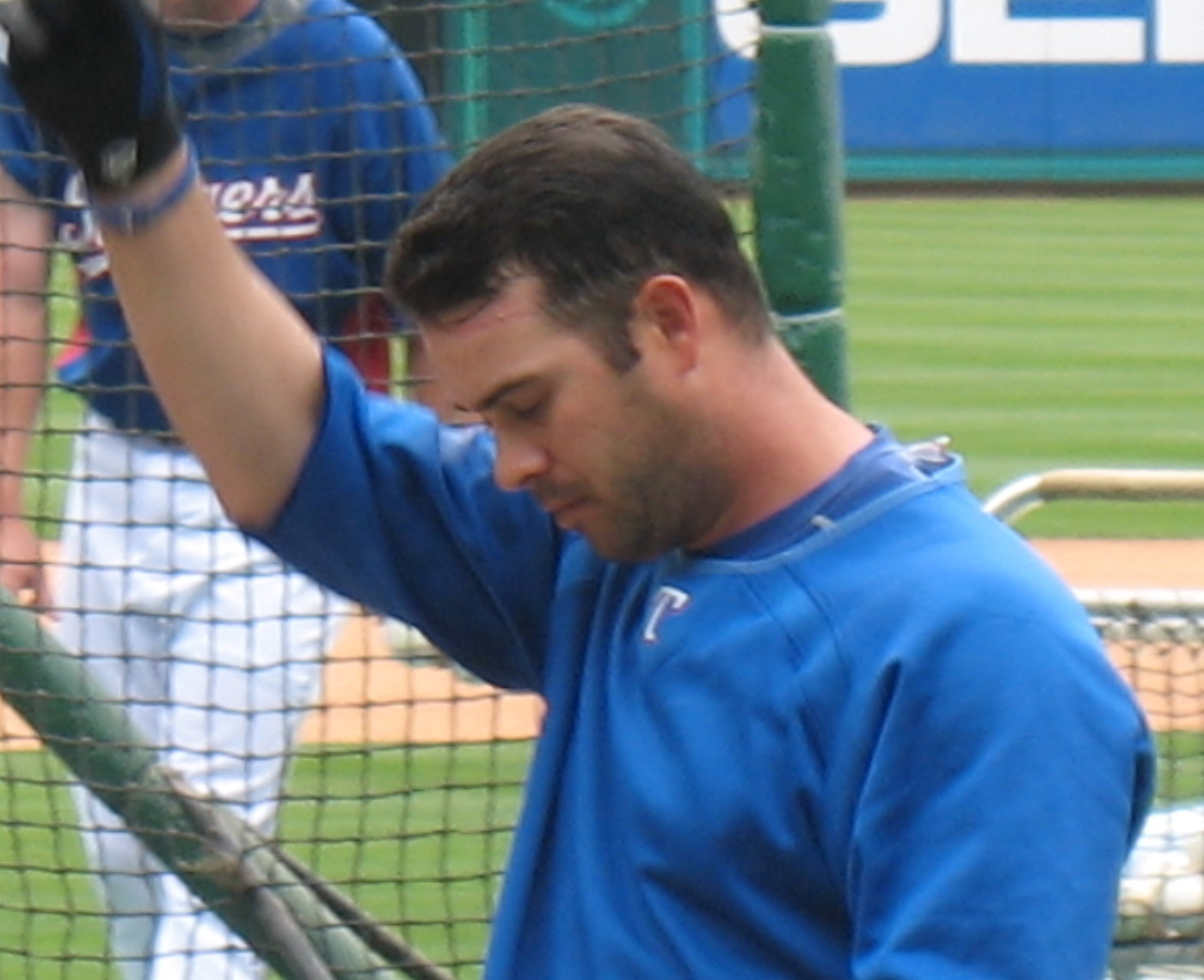
- Vázquez with the Rangers in 2008
- Infielder / Coach
- Born: August 21, 1976 (age 50); Aibonito, Puerto Rico
- Batted: Left Threw: Right

MLB debut
- September 7, 2001, for the Seattle Mariners

Last MLB appearance
- October 4, 2009, for the Pittsburgh Pirates

MLB statistics
- Batting average: .254
- Home runs: 22
- Run batted in: 176
- Stats at Baseball Reference

Teams
- As player: Seattle Mariners (2001); San Diego Padres (2002–2004); Boston Red Sox (2005); Cleveland Indians (2005–2006); Texas Rangers (2007–2008); Pittsburgh Pirates (2009); As coach: San Diego Padres (2017); Boston Red Sox (2018–2026)

Ramón Luis Vázquez (born August 21, 1976) is a Puerto Rican professional baseball coach and a former infielder. He most recently served as bench coach for the Boston Red Sox of Major League Baseball (MLB).

Vázquez played in MLB for the Seattle Mariners, San Diego Padres, Red Sox, Cleveland Indians, Texas Rangers, and Pittsburgh Pirates. As a player, he was listed as 5 feet 11 inches (1.80 m) tall and 195 pounds (88 kg); he batted left-handed and threw right-handed.

== Playing career ==
Vázquez attended Barrio Valle Real High School in Cidra, Puerto Rico and Indian Hills Community College in Centerville, Iowa. He was drafted by the Seattle Mariners in the 27th round (734th overall) of the 1995 Major League Baseball draft.

Vázquez debuted with the Mariners in 2001. Following the 2001 season, he was traded with Tom Lampkin, Brett Tomko and cash to the San Diego Padres for Alex Arias, Ben Davis and Wascar Serrano. Following the 2004 season, Vázquez was traded with David Pauley, Jay Payton and cash to the Boston Red Sox for Dave Roberts. On July 7, 2005, he was traded by the Red Sox to the Cleveland Indians for Alex Cora. Vázquez became a minor league free agent after the 2006 season, and on November 17, 2006, signed a minor league contract with the Texas Rangers. Midseason injuries to Rangers third baseman Hank Blalock and second baseman Ian Kinsler forced Vázquez into an everyday role for the first time since the 2003 season.

On August 22, 2007, Vazquez had seven runs batted in with two home runs in a record-setting 30–3 win over the Baltimore Orioles. On May 12, 2008, against the Mariners, Vázquez hit a walk-off home run in the 10th inning off Brandon Morrow. On July 29, 2008, Vázquez victimized the Mariners again with last at-bat heroics. After his third error of the game allowed the Mariners to take a 10–9 lead in the top of the 9th, Vázquez doubled to right-center field off Mariners closer J. J. Putz, just out of Ichiro's reach, to drive in 2 runs as the Rangers won the game 11–10.

On December 12, 2008, Vázquez signed a two-year deal with the Pittsburgh Pirates. Vázquez also participated in the 2009 World Baseball Classic, representing Puerto Rico, where he played third base.

On April 4, 2010, in a last-minute roster move, Vazquez was designated for assignment by the Pirates, and was released four days later. Vazquez signed a minor league contract with the Seattle Mariners on April 16, 2010. He was later released on June 16, 2010. He signed on to play with the Houston Astros Triple-A affiliate Round Rock Express on June 24, 2010.

After signing a minor league contract with the St. Louis Cardinals for 2011, he was released on June 1. He signed a minor league contract with the Toronto Blue Jays on June 19. He was released on July 22. On August 15, he signed a minor league contract with the Florida Marlins.

== Managing and coaching career ==
After retiring as an active player, Vázquez was recruited as a minor league instructor by the Houston Astros. During the 2014 season, he served as the hitting coach of the Rookie-class Gulf Coast League Astros. The following season, Vázquez served as an infield development specialist for the Lancaster JetHawks in the High-A California League.

On November 19, 2015, Vázquez was named interim manager of the Cangrejeros de Santurce of the Liga de Béisbol Profesional Roberto Clemente (Puerto Rican Winter League), replacing Pedro López in the office. Despite being the defending champions, the team had stalled and was last in the standings with a record of 4–10 when he took charge of it. Under Vázquez, the Cangrejeros made a comeback and were able to classify to the postseason in second place, guaranteeing him the office for the rest of the season. There, the team was paired against the Criollos de Caguas in the semifinals, winning a series of close games to advance. In the finals, Vázquez managed the team to its second consecutive championship, defeating the Indios de Mayagüez despite falling behind early in the series. Ultimately, Santurce managed to clinch the series by picking up the first visitor win of the series, allowing them to play a decisive outing in their home field, the Hiram Bithorn Stadium.

In 2016, Vázquez returned to the Lancaster JetHawks as their manager for their 20th anniversary season. In 2017, he joined the San Diego Padres as a coach, working primarily with infielders.

In 2018, Vázquez joined the Boston Red Sox as a uniformed member of the coaching staff, under manager Alex Cora. During their playing days, Vázquez and Cora had been traded for each other in 2005. Through the 2020 season, Vázquez coordinated statistical analysis and advanced scouting data. On November 20, 2020, his role was updated to that of quality control coach / interpreter. In the first half of August 2021, Vázquez filled in as Boston's first base coach for several games, following the quarantining of regular first base coach Tom Goodwin, who was deemed to be a close contact with bench coach Will Venable after the latter had a positive COVID-19 test. On August 30, Vázquez himself tested positive. Near the end of September, Vázquez took over as Boston's first base coach in preparation for the playoffs, as MLB mandated that only COVID-vaccinated staff would be allowed in dugouts and on the field during the 2021 postseason, and Boston's regular first base coach (Goodwin) was not in compliance.

In December 2021, Vázquez was named the first base coach of the Red Sox. On November 29, 2022, Vazquez was named the bench coach of the Red Sox.

On May 19, 2025, Vázquez recorded his first win as a manager when he filled in for Alex Cora (who was away for his daughter's graduation) in a 3−1 win over the New York Mets. On April 25, 2026, Vázquez was fired by the Red Sox along with Cora and hitting coach Peter Fatse.

== Personal life ==
Vázquez and his wife, Griselda, have two children. They reside in Lancaster, California.

Sporting positions
Preceded by Will Venable	Boston Red Sox bench coach 2023–present	Succeeded by José David Flores
Preceded by Tom Goodwin	Boston Red Sox first base coach 2022	Succeeded by Kyle Hudson
