= Michael Garciaparra =

American baseball player (born 1983)

- Second baseman / Shortstop
- Born: April 2, 1983 (age 43); Whittier, California, U.S.
- Bats: Right Throws: Right
- Stats at Baseball Reference

Michael Garciaparra (born April 2, 1983 in Whittier, California) is an American former professional baseball middle infielder. He is the brother of former All-Star Nomar Garciaparra.

== Playing career ==
Garciaparra graduated from Don Bosco Technical Institute in June 2001. While there, he was named First Team All-Camino Real League in baseball for three years, handled kicking duties for the school's football team, and played varsity soccer. He missed most of the 2001 high school baseball season while recovering from surgery to repair a torn ACL sustained in a football game.

Garciaparra was drafted by the Seattle Mariners as a shortstop in the supplemental first round (36th overall) of the 2001 Major League Baseball draft with the pick awarded to the Mariners after the free agent departure of Alex Rodriguez. He signed with the Mariners with a $2 million signing bonus, forgoing a baseball and football scholarship offer from the University of Tennessee.

Garciaparra was highly touted as a prospect, and in 2001 Upper Deck put his image on the packaging for one of its brands, Prospect Premieres. He played in Seattle's minor league system in five seasons, topping out with the Triple-A Tacoma Rainiers in 2006, where he hit .316 with one home run in 42 games. He primarily played second base in 2005 and 2006, as the Mariners gave the starting shortstop job to Yuniesky Betancourt. Garciaparra was designated for assignment by the Mariners on April 2, 2007, as the team needed roster space for catcher Jamie Burke and pitchers Arthur Rhodes and Brandon Morrow.

The Philadelphia Phillies claimed Garciaparra on April 12. He played most of season with the Double-A Reading Phillies, also suiting up for four games for the Triple-A Ottawa Lynx and three games for the High-A Clearwater Threshers. He hit poorly, with a .234 batting average and .643 on-base plus slugging in his season in the Phillies organization, primarily playing shortstop.

In 2008, Garciaparra signed with the Milwaukee Brewers and played for the Double-A Huntsville Stars. His third year in Double-A was his best, as he his .340. He also played every defensive position except catcher and center field. In 2009, he began the season with the Brewer's Triple-A Nashville Sounds. After 22 games with a lower .271 batting average and little power, Garciaparra was sent back to Huntsville on June 27, where he hit an even worse .206.

On March 16, 2010, Garciaparra signed with the Houston Astros. He started the season with five games with the Triple-A Round Rock Express, then was assigned to the Double-A Corpus Christi Hooks on April 24. He returned to Round Rock on May 17. In his final at-bat in Minor League Baseball, he struck out against the Iowa Cubs on July 23. The Astros released Garciaparra on July 27.

== Post-playing career ==
After his playing career, Garciaparra was a Southern California area scout for the St. Louis Cardinals and an instructor for USA Baseball. He and his father Ramon Garciaparra operate Garciaparra Baseball Group.
