= Paul Abbott (baseball) =

American baseball player (born 1967)

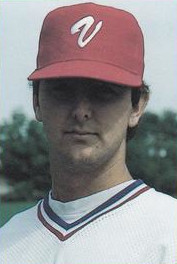
- Abbott in 1988
- Pitcher
- Born: September 15, 1967 (age 59); Van Nuys, California, U.S.
- Batted: Right Threw: Right

MLB debut
- August 21, 1990, for the Minnesota Twins

Last MLB appearance
- August 7, 2004, for the Philadelphia Phillies

MLB statistics
- Win–loss record: 43–37
- Earned run average: 4.92
- Strikeouts: 496
- Stats at Baseball Reference

Teams
- Minnesota Twins (1990–1992); Cleveland Indians (1993); Seattle Mariners (1997–2002); Kansas City Royals (2003); Tampa Bay Devil Rays (2004); Philadelphia Phillies (2004)

Paul David Abbott (born September 15, 1967) is an American former professional baseball pitcher. He played in Major League Baseball (MLB) between 1990 and 2004 for six different teams. He was part of the 2001 Seattle Mariners team that tied the major-league record for the most wins in a season, with Abbott compiling a 17–4 win–loss record. He has one of the highest lifetime winning percentages as a Mariner, at .679 (36–17).

A native of Van Nuys, California, Abbott attended Sunny Hills High School, Fullerton, California, and played professional baseball for 21 consecutive years (1985–2005), including service in minor league and independent league baseball. He threw and batted right-handed. During his playing days, Abbott stood 6 feet 3 inches (1.91 m) tall, weighing 185 pounds (84 kg). Following his playing career, he worked as a minor-league pitching coach in the Boston Red Sox organization for over a decade.

== Professional career ==
Abbott was drafted out of high school, beginning his professional career in the Minnesota Twins farm system, first with the Rookie-Level Elizabethton Twins in 1985. With Elizabethton, 18-year-old Abbott went 1–5 with a 6.94 earned run average (ERA) in 10 games, all starts.

His next season, Abbott was promoted to the Class-A Kenosha Twins of the Midwest League. In 1986, Abbott went 6–10 with a 4.50 ERA in 25 games, 15 starts. He continued to pitch for Kenosha in 1987 as he went 13–6 with a 3.65 ERA in 26 games, 25 starts.

In 1988, Abbott continued to play in Class-A, this time with the Visalia Oaks of the California League. He went 11–9 with a 4.18 ERA in 28 games, all starts. Abbott also had 172 1/3 innings pitched, the most in his minor-league career.

In 1989, Abbott was promoted to the Double-A Orlando Twins of the Southern League. He went 9–3 with a 4.37 ERA in 17 games, all starts.

Abbott began the 1990 season with the Triple-A Portland Beavers of the Pacific Coast League. He went 5–14 with a 4.56 ERA in 23 games, all starts. He was called up to the Minnesota Twins on August 21, 1990. He went 0–5 with 25 strikeouts and a 5.97 ERA in seven games, all starts.

He pitched a total of 28 games for the Twins in three seasons before being released by the team in 1993. He soon signed with the Cleveland Indians as a free agent. He pitched in five total games, garnering a 6.38 ERA. He signed as a free agent with the Kansas City Royals in 1993, Chicago Cubs in 1995 and the San Diego Padres in 1996 but never pitched for either team. He finally latched onto a team to pitch for in the majors with the Seattle Mariners in 1998. He went 3-1 in four games that year before getting his most usage in the next three seasons, appearing in 25 games each time. In the 2000 postseason, he was the starting pitcher in one game each of the ALDS and ALCS, going 1-1 while pitching five innings each. The 2001 season saw him go 17-4 despite an ERA of 4.25. He pitched the middle innings of a blowout in Game 3 of the ALDS, allowing eight runs in three innings. He was tabbed to start Game 4 of the ALCS against the New York Yankees, where he allowed no runs in five innings despite walking eight batters (the Mariners eventually lost the game). His eight walks was two short of the all-time record for a postseason game and it currently is the most by a pitcher in a postseason game played in the 21st century. He went 1-3 with a 11.96 ERA in the 2002 season in his final season with Seattle. He spent the 2004 season with Tampa Bay and Philadelphia, going a combined 3-11 in 20 games.

Abbott retired with a 43–37 win-loss record with a 4.92 ERA in 162 games.

== Coaching career ==
After retiring from professional baseball, Abbott spent his free time coaching at Fullerton Junior College before pursuing coaching more seriously as pitching coach and eventually manager for the independent Orange County Flyers of the Golden Baseball League, working alongside former Los Angeles Angels manager Phil Nevin.

Abbott then spent 13 seasons as a pitching coach in the Boston Red Sox organization: Low-A Lowell Spinners (2011–2012), Single-A Greenville Drive (2013–2014), High-A Salem Red Sox (2015–2017), Double-A Portland Sea Dogs (2018–2019), Triple-A Pawtucket Red Sox (2020), and Triple-A Worcester Red Sox (2021–2023). Following the 2023 season, the Red Sox chose not to renew Abbott's contract.

On February 5, 2025, the Athletics hired Abbott to serve as the pitching coach for their Triple-A affiliate, the Las Vegas Aviators. He had spent the previous season as the pitching coach for the Double-A Midland RockHounds.

== Personal life ==
Abbott has four children. His son Trent played baseball for Fullerton College, was drafted as a pitcher by the Oakland Athletics, but did not play baseball professionally. Another son played college baseball at Sacramento State before playing in the Seattle Mariners organization.
