= Al Martin =

American baseball player (born 1967)

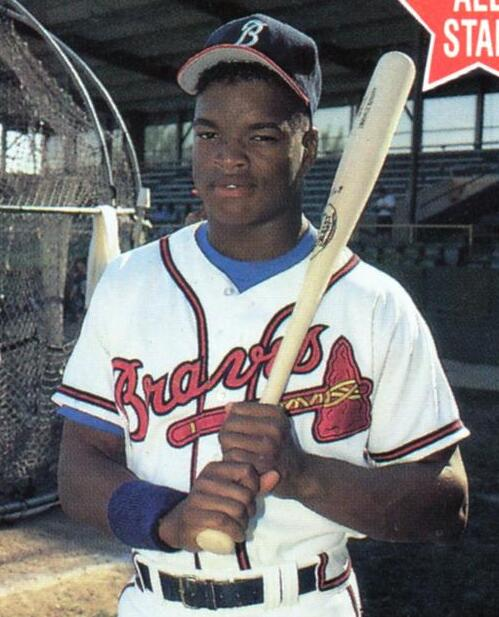
- Martin with the Burlington Braves c. 1988
- Left fielder
- Born: November 24, 1967 (age 58); West Covina, California, U.S.
- Batted: Left Threw: Left

MLB debut
- July 28, 1992, for the Pittsburgh Pirates

Last MLB appearance
- September 21, 2003, for the Tampa Bay Devil Rays

MLB statistics
- Batting average: .276
- Home runs: 132
- Runs batted in: 485

KBO statistics
- Batting average: .291
- Home runs: 9
- Runs batted in: 52
- Stats at Baseball Reference

Teams
- Pittsburgh Pirates (1992–1999); San Diego Padres (2000); Seattle Mariners (2000–2001); Tampa Bay Devil Rays (2003); LG Twins (2004)

Albert Lee Martin (born November 24, 1967) is an American former professional baseball left fielder. He played 12 seasons in Major League Baseball, mostly for the Pittsburgh Pirates. He also played one season in the KBO League.

== Early life ==
Martin graduated from John A. Rowland High School in Rowland Heights, California in 1985.

== Professional career ==
The Atlanta Braves drafted Martin in the eighth round of the 1985 MLB draft out of high school. He was granted free agency after the 1991 season and signed with the Pittsburgh Pirates. Martin played for four teams in the majors: the Pittsburgh (1992–99), San Diego Padres (2000), Seattle Mariners (2000–01), and Tampa Bay Devil Rays (2003). His best season was in 1996 when he hit .300 with 18 home runs and 72 RBIs. That year he also stole 38 bases. He played for the KBO's LG Twins in 2004.

== Controversies ==
Martin claimed to have played football at University of Southern California. In 2001, he compared a collision with Seattle teammate Carlos Guillén to the time he tried to tackle Michigan running back Leroy Hoard in 1986, when he was playing strong safety at Southern California. In actuality, USC and Michigan did not meet that year, and Martin was an outfielder in the Atlanta Braves' system at the time. Furthermore, USC has no record that Martin ever attended the university.

Martin also apparently falsely claimed to have been selected for the 1994 Major League Baseball All-Star Game but to have been unable to play due to injury, an inaccuracy which was published in the 2003 Tampa Bay Devil Rays media guide.

In 2000, Martin was involved in a domestic abuse incident with a woman named Shawn Haggerty. She told police that she was married to Martin, who was already married to another woman. Martin ultimately pleaded guilty to a domestic violence charge. After signing with the Seattle Mariners, he falsely told the Seattle Times that he had been exonerated from the charges.

== See also ==
- List of Major League Baseball career stolen bases leaders
