= Wascar Serrano =

Dominican baseball player (born 1977)

- Pitcher
- Born: June 2, 1977 (age 48); Santo Domingo, Dominican Republic
- Batted: Right Threw: Right

MLB debut
- May 12, 2001, for the San Diego Padres

Last MLB appearance
- October 5, 2001, for the San Diego Padres

MLB statistics
- Win–loss record: 3-3
- Earned run average: 6.56
- Strikeouts: 39
- Stats at Baseball Reference

Teams
- San Diego Padres (2001)

Wascar Radames Serrano (born June 2, 1977 in Santo Domingo, Dominican Republic) is a Dominican former professional baseball pitcher. He played part of one season in Major League Baseball for the San Diego Padres in 2001. After pitching in 2003 for the independent Kansas City T-Bones of the Northern League, he pitched part of the 2005 season in the Mexican League for the Piratas de Campeche and the Leones de Yucatán before retiring.
