= John Halama =

American baseball pitcher (born 1972)

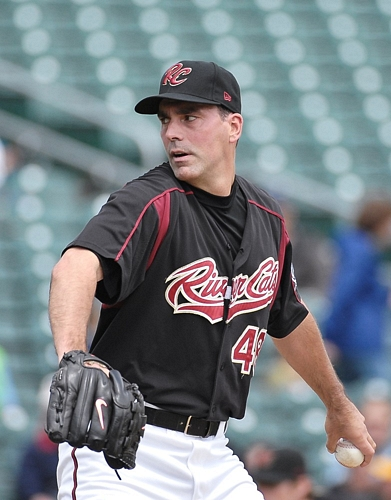
- Halama with the Sacramento River Cats
- Pitcher
- Born: February 22, 1972 (age 54); Brooklyn, New York, U.S.
- Batted: Left Threw: Left

MLB debut
- April 2, 1998, for the Houston Astros

Last MLB appearance
- June 10, 2006, for the Baltimore Orioles

Career statistics
- Win–loss record: 56–48
- Earned run average: 4.65
- Strikeouts: 492
- Stats at Baseball Reference

Teams
- Houston Astros (1998); Seattle Mariners (1999–2002); Oakland Athletics (2003); Tampa Bay Devil Rays (2004); Boston Red Sox (2005); Washington Nationals (2005); Baltimore Orioles (2006); Uni-President 7-Eleven Lions (2011)

John Thadeuz Halama (born February 22, 1972) is an American former Major League Baseball pitcher. During his major league career, Halama played with the Houston Astros (1998), Seattle Mariners (1999–2002), Oakland Athletics (2003), Tampa Bay Devil Rays (2004), Boston Red Sox (2005), Washington Nationals (2005), and Baltimore Orioles (2006). He bats and throws left-handed.

== Career ==
=== Houston Astros ===
Halama made his debut with the Houston Astros in 1998. Prior to that he had attended St. Francis College and Pitched for the Terriers from 1991 to 1994. Halama also attended and graduated from Bishop Ford Central Catholic High School in Brooklyn, New York in 1990.

=== Seattle Mariners ===
In midseason 1998, Halama was sent to Seattle along with Freddy García and Carlos Guillén in the same trade that brought Randy Johnson to Houston. Halama won 41 games for the Mariners in a four-year span, with a career high 14 victories in 2000. In 2001, Halama threw the first nine-inning perfect game in the history of the Pacific Coast League.

=== Oakland Athletics ===
In 2003, Halama went 3–5 in 35 games for the A's.

=== Tampa Bay Devil Rays ===
In 2004, Halama went 7–6 with a 4.70 ERA in 34 appearances, including 14 starts for the Devil Rays.

=== Boston Red Sox ===
Halama was signed by Boston as a free agent on December 17, 2004. After appearing in thirty games, Halama was released by the Red Sox on July 26, 2005.

=== Washington Nationals ===
Halama was signed by the Nationals on August 5, 2005, and made ten appearances for them, including three starts, before his release on October 2.

=== Baltimore Orioles ===
In 2006, he played his last big league season with the Baltimore Orioles, pitching to a 6.14 ERA over 17 contests.

=== Long Island Ducks ===
Halama pitched for the Long Island Ducks of the Atlantic League in 2007, leading the league in innings pitched with 167.1, He was later selected by the Southern Maryland Blue Crabs in the 2008 expansion draft.

=== Cleveland Indians ===
On June 5, 2008, Halama signed a minor league contract with the Cleveland Indians, and was assigned to the Triple-A Buffalo Bisons. He became a free agent at the end of the season.

=== Southern Maryland Blue Crabs ===
At the end of the 2008 season, Halama signed with the Southern Maryland Blue Crabs of the Atlantic League. There he went 8–1 with a 2.38 ERA. After his stint with Gwinnett, Halama rejoined the Blue Crabs in September 2009, and won two games, including the decisive game 5, in the first round of the Atlantic League of Professional Baseball playoffs.

=== Atlanta Braves ===
On June 13, 2009, the Atlanta Braves purchased Halama's contract from the Southern Maryland Blue Crabs. He started 13 games for the Triple-A Gwinnett Braves, and had a 4–7 record with 90 innings pitched before his release on September 18.

=== Milwaukee Brewers ===
Halama signed a minor league contract with the Milwaukee Brewers in November 2009.

On March 16, 2010, Halama was released by the Brewers.

=== Return to Oakland Athletics ===
On May 23, 2010, Halama signed a minor league contract with the Oakland Athletics. He was released by the team in September.

=== Lancaster Barnstormers ===
Halama pitched for the Lancaster Barnstormers of the Atlantic League of Professional Baseball. He was named to the 2012 Atlantic League All Star Team and was named the Starting Pitcher for the Freedom Division.

=== Retirement ===
Halama served as the pitching coach for the York Revolution, rivals of his former team, the Lancaster Barnstormers, for the 2013 season.

== Major league summary ==
Spanning a career of seven-plus seasons in the Major Leagues, Halama compiled a 53–44 record with 469 strikeouts and a 4.60 ERA in 860.1 innings pitched.
