= José Paniagua =

Dominican baseball player (born 1973)

- Pitcher
- Born: August 20, 1973 (age 52); San José de Ocoa, Dominican Republic
- Batted: Right Threw: Right

Professional debut
- MLB: April 4, 1996, for the Montreal Expos
- CPBL: March 19, 2006, for the Macoto Cobras

Last appearance
- MLB: September 9, 2003, for the Chicago White Sox
- CPBL: April 21, 2006, for the Macoto Cobras

MLB statistics
- Win–loss record: 18–21
- Earned run average: 4.49
- Strikeouts: 276

CPBL statistics
- Win–loss record: 1–2
- Earned run average: 2.60
- Strikeouts: 15
- Stats at Baseball Reference

Teams
- Montreal Expos (1996–1997); Seattle Mariners (1998–2001); Detroit Tigers (2002); Chicago White Sox (2003); Macoto Cobras (2006)

José Luis Paniagua Sánchez (born August 20, 1973) is a Dominican former professional baseball relief pitcher. He played in Major League Baseball (MLB) for the Montreal Expos, Seattle Mariners, Detroit Tigers, and Chicago White Sox from 1996 to 2003.

== Career ==
=== Early career ===
Jesús Alou, working as a scout for the Montreal Expos, signed Paniagua in 1990. Paniagua pitched in the Dominican Republic in 1991 and 1992, making his debut in the United States in 1993 in the Rookie-level Gulf Coast League (GCL) with the GCL Expos.

Named one of the Expos' top ten prospects by Baseball America before the 1994 season, Paniagua pitched for the West Palm Beach Expos of the Class A-Advanced Florida State League that year. In 1995, Paniagua started the season with the Harrisburg Senators of the Class AA Eastern League, but was promoted to the Ottawa Lynx of the Class AAA International League to pitch in the Governors' Cup, the league championship series. He pitched in game one, recording the win.

=== Major League Baseball ===
Paniagua made his Major League Baseball (MLB) debut on April 5, 1996, defeating the Cincinnati Reds, as the Expos needed a starter to replace the injured Carlos Pérez. However, the Expos sent him back to the minor leagues later that month, when Perez returned. In 22 games for the Expos in 1996 and 1997, Paniagua pitched to a 3–6 win–loss record with a 5.74 earned run average.

The Tampa Bay Devil Rays selected Paniagua from the Expos in the 1997 MLB expansion draft. Later that offseason, the Seattle Mariners selected Paniagua from waivers. Paniagua spent most of the 1998 season with the Tacoma Rainiers, the Mariners' Class AAA affiliate, which play in the Pacific Coast League. He received a promotion to the Mariners in August, joining the Mariners' bullpen as a relief pitcher.

On December 16, 2001, the Mariners traded Paniagua with Brian Fuentes and Denny Stark to the Colorado Rockies for Jeff Cirillo. Though the Rockies intended to send Paniagua to the Detroit Tigers for Shane Halter, the trade fell apart. On March 25, 2002, the Rockies traded Paniagua to the Detroit Tigers for Víctor Santos and Ronnie Merrill. The Tigers released Paniagua during September.

Paniagua signed as a free agent with the Devil Rays in February 2003, but was released in March. He played for the Rojos del Águila de Veracruz in the Mexican League, until the Chicago White Sox purchased him on August 26, 2003. He appeared in one game with the White Sox, on September 9. Paniagua entered the game with a six-run lead in the ninth inning. He proceeded to allow four earned runs on three hits and a walk in 1/3 of an inning. He then was pulled from the game by manager Jerry Manuel. On his way to the dugout, he started arguing with umpire Mark Carlson, who ejected him. Paniagua responded by giving Carlson the finger. Although he expressed remorse for his actions in a meeting with Manuel and general manager Kenny Williams, the White Sox released him the next day; Williams said that he could understand Paniagua was somewhat rusty, but felt that "the loss of composure at a crucial time or situation is just something we can’t tolerate."

=== Later career ===
Paniagua signed with the New York Mets in January 2007, but was released in March. The San Diego Padres signed him in July; he was granted free agency in October. He also saw time in the Florida Marlins and Pittsburgh Pirates organizations.

Paniagua split 2008 in independent league baseball between the St. George RoadRunners of the Golden Baseball League and the Long Island Ducks of the Atlantic League of Professional Baseball.
