= Carlos Guillén =

Venezuelan baseball player (born 1975)

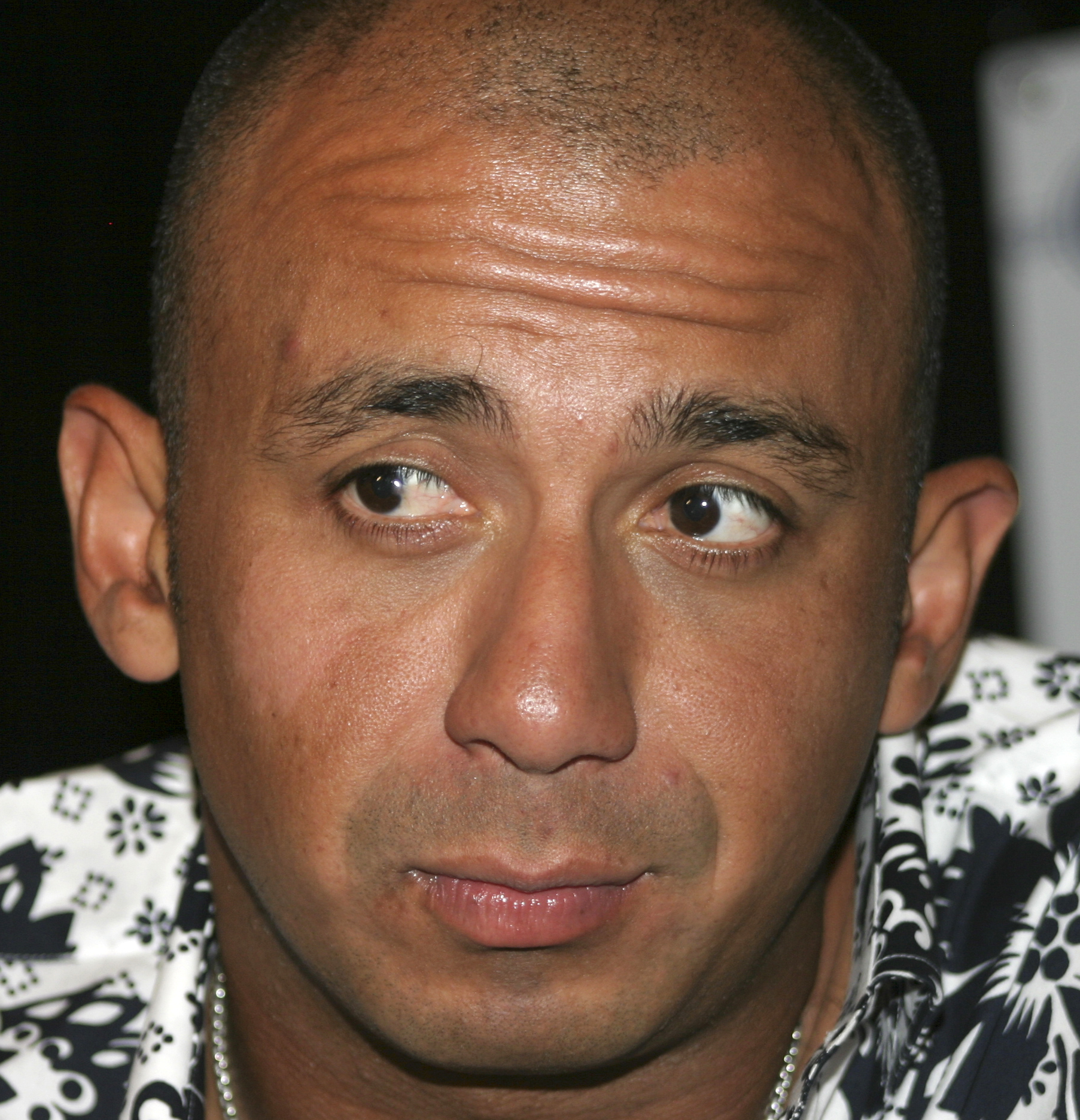
- Guillén during a press event for the 2008 MLB All-Star Game
- Shortstop
- Born: September 30, 1975 (age 51); Maracay, Venezuela
- Batted: Switch Threw: Right

MLB debut
- September 6, 1998, for the Seattle Mariners

Last MLB appearance
- September 18, 2011, for the Detroit Tigers

MLB statistics
- Batting average: .285
- Home runs: 124
- Runs batted in: 660
- Stats at Baseball Reference

Teams
- Seattle Mariners (1998–2003); Detroit Tigers (2004–2011)

Career highlights and awards
- 3× All-Star (2004, 2007, 2008)

Carlos Alfonso Guillén (born September 30, 1975) is a Venezuelan former professional baseball infielder. He played in Major League Baseball for the Seattle Mariners and Detroit Tigers.

Guillén was signed by the Houston Astros as a non-draft amateur free agent in 1992. He was traded to the Mariners with pitcher Freddy García and John Halama in the deal that sent Randy Johnson to the Astros. Guillén made his debut in 1998 and was traded to Detroit at the end of the 2003 season. He retired after the 2011 season. In 1,305 games over 14 seasons, Guillén posted a .285 batting average with 124 home runs and 660 RBI.

== Playing career ==
=== Seattle Mariners ===
In Seattle, Guillén was initially forced to play second and third base with incumbent Alex Rodriguez at shortstop. After Alex Rodriguez signed with the Texas Rangers for the 2000 season, Guillén moved back to his natural position. He had a league-average campaign in his first full season with the club.

In Game 3 of the 2000 American League Division Series, he hit a squeeze play in the bottom of the ninth inning to score Rickey Henderson and complete the Mariners' sweep of the Chicago White Sox. In September 2001, Guillén was hospitalized after being diagnosed with pulmonary tuberculosis, but was ready for the American League Championship Series against the New York Yankees the following month.

=== Detroit Tigers ===
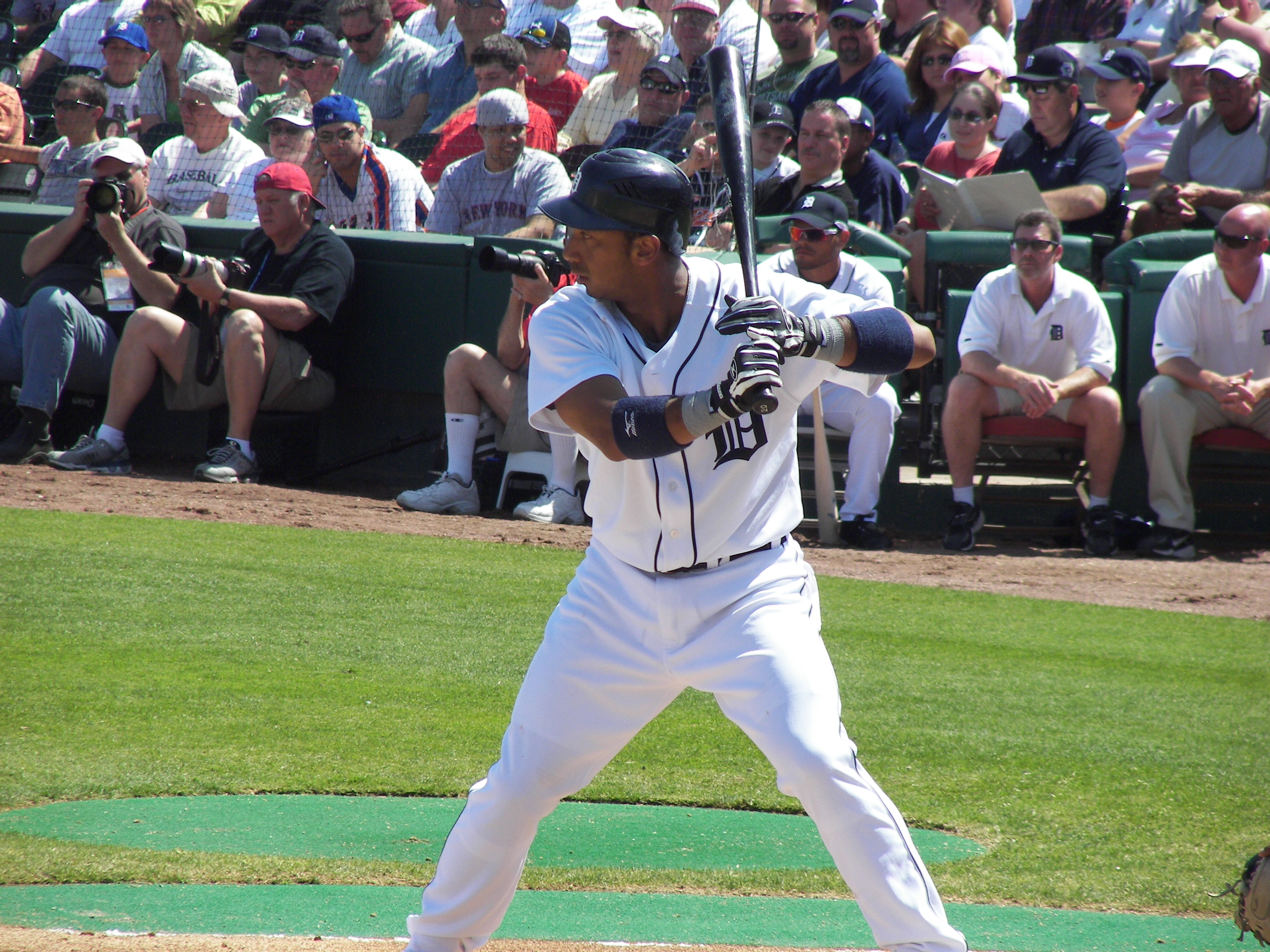
Guillén with the Detroit Tigers

In 2004, Guillén joined a young and restructured Tigers team. In a career year, he led his club in RBI (97), runs (97), doubles (37), triples (10), total bases (283), slugging percentage (.542), OPS (.921), and his .318 batting average was only second to .334 of teammate Iván Rodríguez. Guillén also got his first All-Star berth. However, his breakout season was cut short, as he missed the final month of the 2004 season after tearing his ACL while legging out a triple. He healed well during the 2004 05 offseason and was back to his previous form in time for 2005's opening day, although problems with his left hamstring kept him out of the lineup for much of the year.

Guillén returned to elite status in 2006 having another outstanding season. His on-base percentage reached .400 for the first time in his career, and he led all Major League shortstops with a .919 OPS. On August 1, 2006, Guillén became the tenth Tiger to hit for the cycle in a game against the Tampa Bay Devil Rays. In 2006, Guillén became the first player in modern Major League history to raise his average for six consecutive seasons, batting .320. In the field, however, he tied for the major league lead in errors at shortstop, with 28. On August 6, 2007, he got his 1,000th hit, knocking in Curtis Granderson with two out in the bottom of the first. Guillen hit a home run in extra innings against the Yankees ending a marathon game that ended at 3:30 AM due to the length of the game and rain delays. On September 30, 2007, on his 32nd birthday, Guillén hit the 94th home run of his career and it gave him 100 RBIs in a season for the first time in his career.

Due to the acquisition of shortstop Édgar Rentería from the Atlanta Braves during the 2007–2008 offseason, and due to his decreased mobility, Guillén initially moved to first base to start the 2008 season. However, on April 22, manager Jim Leyland announced that Guillén would be moving to third base, with Miguel Cabrera becoming the new starting first baseman. On September 27, 2008, Tigers manager Jim Leyland announced that Guillén would play left field in 2009. Guillén sat out several weeks of the season with a shoulder injury. Jim Leyland announced Guillén would play left field again in 2010 if he stays healthy, but Guillén publicly stated he would prefer to play third base or shortstop. In May 2010, it was announced that Guillén would be the Tigers 2nd baseman after returning from a hamstring injury which he suffered on April 23, replacing rookie Scott Sizemore.

Guillén sat out the first half of 2011 after having microfracture surgery on his left knee in September. He finally returned to play on July 16. Shortly after returning he hit a home run off of Jered Weaver during the July 31, 2011, game vs the Los Angeles Angels of Anaheim. Weaver was upset about Magglio Ordóñez hitting a home run off of him earlier, and quipped to Tigers first baseman Miguel Cabrera that he was "an asshole" about the situation. Following the home run, Guillén retaliated by "taunting" Weaver by flipping his bat as he started rounding the bases. Weaver was eventually ejected after throwing a high fastball in retaliation at the head of the following batter, Detroit catcher Alex Avila. On October 30, Carlos elected to become a free-agent, ending his tenure with the Tigers. During the weekend of August 4, 2012, the Tigers held a variety of events in Guillén's honor, which he attended.

=== Retirement ===
On February 1, 2012, Guillén signed a minor league contract with the Seattle Mariners. He also received an invitation to spring training. However, he announced his retirement on March 6, 2012, without playing any games for Seattle that spring.

== Personal life ==
Guillén has three children with his wife Amelia.

== See also ==
- List of Major League Baseball players from Venezuela
- List of Major League Baseball players to hit for the cycle

Achievements
Preceded by Luke Scott	Hitting for the cycle August 1, 2006	Succeeded by Gary Matthews Jr.
