= 2002 Oakland Athletics season =

Major League Baseball team season

2002 Oakland Athletics
- American League West champions
- League: American League
- Division: West
- Ballpark: Network Associates Coliseum
- City: Oakland, California
- Record: 103–59 (.636)
- Divisional place: 1st
- Owners: Stephen Schott & Kenneth Hofmann
- General managers: Billy Beane
- Managers: Art Howe
- Television: KICU-TV; FSN Bay Area (Ray Fosse, Greg Papa)
- Radio: KFRC (Bill King, Ken Korach, Ray Fosse)

The 2002 Oakland Athletics season was the 102nd season in franchise history and the 35th season in Oakland, California. The Athletics finished first in the American League West with a record of 103–59.

The Athletics' 2002 campaign ranks among the most famous in franchise history. Following the 2001 season, Oakland saw the departure of three key players. Billy Beane, the team's general manager, responded with a series of under-the-radar free-agent signings. The new-look Athletics, despite a comparative lack of star power, surprised the baseball world by besting the 2001 team's regular season record. The team is most famous, however, for winning 20 consecutive games between August 13 and September 4, 2002. They proceeded to lose in the 2002 American League Division Series to the Minnesota Twins.

The Athletics' season was the subject of Michael Lewis's 2003 book Moneyball: The Art of Winning an Unfair Game (Lewis was given the opportunity to follow the team around throughout the season). A film adaptation of the book, titled Moneyball, was released in 2011.

== Offseason ==
- November 2, 2001: Mark Bellhorn was traded by the Oakland Athletics to the Chicago Cubs for Adam Morrissey (minors).
- December 7, 2001: Billy Koch was traded to the Oakland Athletics by the Toronto Blue Jays for Eric Hinske and Justin Miller.
- December 14, 2001: David Justice was traded to the Oakland Athletics by the New York Mets for Mark Guthrie and Tyler Yates. This trade was preceded by a swap between the New York Mets and New York Yankees of Robin Ventura for Justice one week prior. The Mets paid $1.2 million of Justice's $7 million salary.
- January 2, 2002: Scott Hatteberg was signed as a free agent by the Oakland Athletics.
- January 11, 2002: Randy Velarde was signed as a free agent by the Oakland Athletics.
- January 14, 2002: Carlos Peña and Mike Venafro were traded to the Oakland Athletics by the Texas Rangers for Jason Hart, Gerald Laird, Ryan Ludwick, and Mario Ramos.
- March 19, 2002: Justin Duchscherer was traded to the Oakland Athletics by the Texas Rangers for Luis Vizcaíno.

== Regular season ==
=== Summary ===
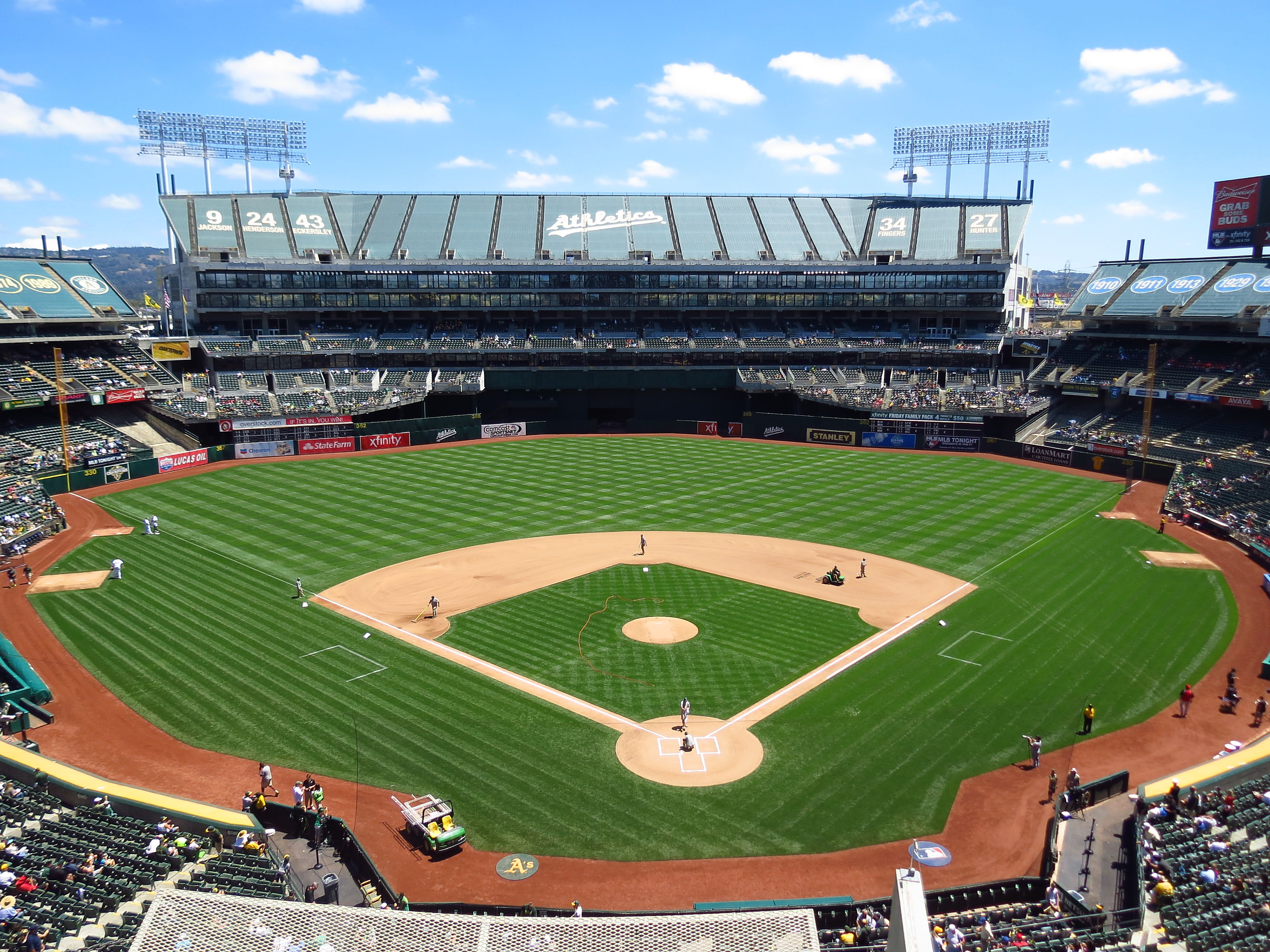
Oakland Coliseum

Oakland's 2002 campaign began on a tumultuous note. During the 2001–02 offseason, the team lost three key free agents to larger-market teams: 2000 AL MVP Jason Giambi to the New York Yankees, outfielder Johnny Damon to the Boston Red Sox, and closer Jason Isringhausen to the St. Louis Cardinals. General manager Billy Beane sought to replace Damon and Giambi with free agent hitters Scott Hatteberg and David Justice. Beane also made a number of key pitching acquisitions; most notably, he traded for Toronto Blue Jays reliever Billy Koch, who ultimately succeeded Isringhausen as the team's closer. Beane also traded for then-unheralded starter Ted Lilly and for second baseman Ray Durham. The season also saw the MLB debuts of second baseman Mark Ellis and eventual starter Aaron Harang.

The new-look Athletics experienced a bumpy start to the season. The team followed a respectable 15–10 start with an abysmal 5–16 run; at the end of their slump, on May 23, the team's record stood at 20–26. From that point forward, the Athletics' fortunes improved significantly. In a prelude to the team's famous late-season winning streak, the Athletics went 16–1 from June 6 to June 24. The surge propelled the club to within two games of first place, but a prolonged funk saw the A's play roughly .500 baseball for the next month and a half. That ended with an unremarkable 2–1 loss in Oakland to the Toronto Blue Jays on Monday, August 12.

On August 13, the Athletics began their then-AL-record 20-game win streak. The streak's first win came courtesy of Barry Zito, who allowed three runs (one earned) over eight innings in a 5–4 victory over the Jays. Over the next several weeks, stellar pitching, hitting, and defense propelled the Athletics' surge. Most notable were the efforts of fourth starter Cory Lidle. During August, Lidle went 5–0 while posting a scant 0.20 earned run average (he allowed one run his final start of the month); three of his five winning decisions were during the streak. Many of the Athletics' victories were by narrow margins; closer Billy Koch recorded either a win or save in 12 of the streak's 20 games.

The Athletics' 18th and 19th wins came courtesy of game ending hits by shortstop Miguel Tejada. On September 4, Oakland sought to win its 20th consecutive game; in doing so, the team hoped to break the 1947 New York Yankees' American League record of 19 consecutive wins. Their opponent was the Kansas City Royals. Over the first three innings of the game, Oakland shelled Kansas City pitchers Paul Byrd and Darrell May for a total of 11 runs, building a seemingly insurmountable 11–0 lead. Sloppy play down the stretch, however, allowed the Royals to score five runs apiece in the fourth and eighth innings. In the ninth, Koch surrendered a two-out single to Royals pinch hitter Luis Alicea; the single allowed pinch runner Kit Pellow to score the tying run. So the Athletics entered the bottom of the ninth inning with the score tied at 11–11. Pinch hitter Scott Hatteberg then hit a one-out solo walkoff home run off of Kansas City reliever Jason Grimsley. The home run clinched the AL-record 20th consecutive victory for the Athletics.

Oakland's streak came to an end with a 6–0 loss to the Minnesota Twins on September 6. The A's continued to play well down the stretch, and finished with a record of 103–59. The club's late-season surge allowed it to hold off the Anaheim Angels, who finished four games behind them at 99–63. Oakland's regular season exploits, however, once again failed to translate into postseason success. The team again lost the American League Division Series (this time to the Twins) in five games.

Tejada and starting pitcher Barry Zito went on to win the American League MVP and Cy Young Award, respectively. Tejada left the Athletics following the 2003 season, while Zito stayed until the end of the 2006 campaign.

=== Game log ===
2002 Game Log (103–59)
April: 15–11 (Home: 10–6; Away: 5–5)

#	Date	Opponent	Score	Win	Loss	Save	Attendance	Record	Streak
1	April 1	Rangers	8–3	**Mulder** (1–0)	Park (0–1)	—	43,908	1–0	W1
2	April 2	Rangers	3–2	**Koch** (1–0)	Miceli (0–1)	—	10,267	2–0	W2
3	April 3	Rangers	9–6	**Mecir** (1–0)	Rodriguez (0–1)	**Koch** (1)	23,259	3–0	W3
4	April 4	Rangers	5–7	Davis (1–0)	**Lidle** (0–1)	—	15,081	3–1	L1
5	April 5	@ Mariners	1–7	Baldwin (1–0)	**Hiljus** (0–1)	—	40,303	3–2	L2
6	April 6	@ Mariners	8–3	**Mulder** (2–0)	García (0–2)	—	45,093	4–2	W1
7	April 7	@ Mariners	6–5	**Hudson** (1–0)	Moyer (0–1)	**Koch** (2)	39,870	5–2	W2
8	April 9	@ Rangers	5–4 (11)	**Koch** (2–0)	Seánez (0–1)	—	20,158	6–2	W3
9	April 10	@ Rangers	2–4	Burba (1–0)	**Lidle** (0–2)	Rocker (1)	21,384	6–3	L1
10	April 11	@ Rangers	0–7	Davis (2–0)	**Mulder** (2–1)	—	21,903	6–4	L2
11	April 12	@ Angels	5–1	**Hudson** (2–0)	Ortiz (1–1)	—	31,815	7–4	W1
12	April 13	@ Angels	7–2	**Hiljus** (1–1)	Washburn (0–2)	—	33,554	8–4	W2
13	April 14	@ Angels	1–4	Appier (1–1)	**Zito** (0–1)	Levine (3)	32,881	8–5	L1
14	April 16	Mariners	2–6 (7)	Piñeiro (1–0)	**Lidle** (0–3)	—	13,022	8–6	L2
15	April 17	Mariners	4–7	Moyer (2–1)	**Hudson** (2–1)	Sasaki (4)	31,260	8–7	L3
16	April 18	Angels	4–2	**Hiljus** (2–1)	Ortiz (1–2)	**Koch** (3)	9,145	9–7	W1
17	April 19	Angels	7–9	Washburn (1–2)	**Fyhrie** (0–1)	Percival (2)	12,468	9–8	L1
18	April 20	Angels	8–7	**Bradford** (1–0)	Levine (1–1)	**Koch** (4)	20,253	10–8	W1
19	April 21	Angels	6–5	**Venafro** (1–0)	Percival (0–1)	—	20,088	11–8	W2
20	April 23	Yankees	1–2	Hernández (3–1)	**Hudson** (2–2)	Rivera (6)	40,360	11–9	L1
21	April 24	Yankees	5–8	Stanton (1–0)	**Magnante** (0–1)	Rivera (7)	54,513	11–10	L2
22	April 25	Yankees	6–2	**Zito** (1–1)	Mussina (3–1)	—	31,870	12–10	W1
23	April 26	White Sox	6–4	**Lidle** (1–3)	Parque (0–1)	**Koch** (5)	10,129	13–10	W2
24	April 27	White Sox	16–1	**Fyhrie** (1–1)	Buehrle (4–2)	—	26,111	14–10	W3
25	April 28	White Sox	10–0	**Hudson** (3–2)	Ritchie (2–2)	—	20,365	15–10	W4
26	April 30	@ Yankees	2–8	Wells (4–0)	**Zito** (1–2)	—	32,888	15–11	L1

May: 10–17 (Home: 5–7; Away: 5–10)

#	Date	Opponent	Score	Win	Loss	Save	Attendance	Record	Streak
27	May 1	@ Yankees	4–1	**Hiljus** (3–1)	Mussina (3–2)	**Koch** (6)	31,006	16–11	W1
28	May 2	@ Yankees	2–9	Clemens (4–2)	**Lidle** (1–4)	—	30,463	16–12	L1
29	May 3	@ White Sox	1–6	Buehrle (5–2)	**Fyhrie** (1–2)	—	15,746	16–13	L2
30	May 4	@ White Sox	2–10	Ritchie (3–2)	**Hudson** (3–3)	—	27,511	16–14	L3
31	May 5	@ White Sox	3–2	**Zito** (2–2)	Wright (3–3)	**Koch** (7)	27,275	17–14	W1
32	May 7	Red Sox	7–9	Arrojo (2–0)	**Mecir** (1–1)	Urbina (12)	19,715	17–15	L1
33	May 8	Red Sox	6–12	Burkett (3–0)	**Hiljus** (3–2)	—	40,155	17–16	L2
34	May 9	Red Sox	1–5	Lowe (5–1)	**Hudson** (3–4)	—	18,477	17–17	L3
35	May 10	Blue Jays	2–6	Prokopec (2–4)	**Mulder** (2–2)	—	10,824	17–18	L4
36	May 11	Blue Jays	7–4	**Zito** (3–2)	Miller (2–1)	—	21,115	18–18	W1
37	May 12	Blue Jays	4–11	Halladay (3–1)	**Lidle** (1–5)	Walker (1)	19,519	18–19	L1
38	May 14	@ Red Sox	2–6	Burkett (4–0)	**Hudson** (3–5)	—	31,404	18–20	L2
39	May 15	@ Red Sox	2–8	Lowe (6–1)	**Hiljus** (3–3)	—	32,346	18–21	L3
40	May 16	@ Red Sox	5–0	**Zito** (4–2)	Castillo (2–4)	—	33,057	19–21	W1
41	May 17	@ Blue Jays	1–7	Halladay (4–1)	**Mulder** (2–3)	—	14,061	19–22	L1
42	May 18	@ Blue Jays	3–6	Miller (3–1)	**Fyhrie** (1–3)	Escobar (7)	17,846	19–23	L2
43	May 19	@ Blue Jays	0–11	Loaiza (2–0)	**Hudson** (3–6)	—	23,408	19–24	L3
44	May 21	Orioles	4–6 (14)	Driskill (1–0)	**Venafro** (1–1)	Julio (9)	10,245	19–25	L4
45	May 22	Orioles	7–6	**Fyhrie** (2–3)	Maduro (2–4)	**Koch** (8)	20,444	20–25	W1
46	May 23	Orioles	3–11	Ponson (3–3)	**Mulder** (2–4)	—	11,737	20–26	L1
47	May 24	Devil Rays	9–8	**Mecir** (2–1)	Zambrano (1–4)	**Koch** (9)	25,458	21–26	W1
48	May 25	Devil Rays	6–0	**Harang** (1–0)	Harper (1–2)	**Bradford** (1)	31,697	22–26	W2
49	May 26	Devil Rays	7–0	**Zito** (5–2)	Kennedy (1–2)	—	15,943	23–26	W3
50	May 28	@ Orioles	5–2	**Mulder** (3–4)	Maduro (2–5)	**Koch** (10)	24,825	24–26	W4
51	May 29	@ Orioles	5–10	Bauer (2–2)	**Fyhrie** (2–4)	—	24,913	24–27	L1
52	May 30	@ Devil Rays	3–4 (13)	Harper (2–2)	**Bradford** (1–1)	—	10,130	24–28	L2
53	May 31	@ Devil Rays	13–9	**Venafro** (2–1)	Yan (2–2)	—	10,227	25–28	W1

June: 21–7 (Home: 10–3; Away: 11–4)

#	Date	Opponent	Score	Win	Loss	Save	Attendance	Record	Streak
54	June 1	@ Devil Rays	8–3	**Zito** (6–2)	Kennedy (3–5)	—	14,073	26–28	W2
55	June 2	@ Devil Rays	4–2	**Mulder** (4–4)	Rupe (5–6)	**Koch** (11)	10,563	27–28	W3
56	June 3	Mariners	1–4	García (7–4)	**Harang** (1–1)	Sasaki (13)	14,188	27–29	L1
57	June 4	Mariners	3–2 (10)	**Koch** (3–0)	Hasegawa (3–1)	—	13,528	28–29	W1
58	June 5	Mariners	0–5	Moyer (5–2)	**Lidle** (1–6)	—	35,647	28–30	L1
59	June 6	Mariners	10–4	**Zito** (7–2)	Baldwin (4–5)	—	27,344	29–30	W1
60	June 7	Astros	5–3	**Mulder** (5–4)	Oswalt (6–4)	**Koch** (12)	17,453	30–30	W2
61	June 8	Astros	5–1	**Harang** (2–1)	Reynolds (3–6)	—	27,115	31–30	W3
62	June 9	Astros	7–6	**Koch** (4–0)	Dotel (3–3)	—	35,065	32–30	W4
63	June 10	Brewers	8–6	**Bradford** (2–1)	de los Santos (1–2)	**Koch** (13)	10,584	33–30	W5
64	June 11	Brewers	11–2	**Zito** (8–2)	Figueroa (1–4)	—	11,223	34–30	W6
65	June 12	Brewers	8–0	**Mulder** (6–4)	Sheets (3–7)	—	20,847	35–30	W7
66	June 14	@ Giants	3–2	**Hudson** (4–6)	Schmidt (2–2)	**Koch** (14)	41,457	36–30	W8
67	June 15	@ Giants	2–6	Zerbe (2–0)	**Harang** (2–2)	—	41,298	36–31	L1
68	June 16	@ Giants	2–1	**Zito** (9–2)	Rueter (7–5)	**Koch** (15)	41,550	37–31	W1
69	June 18	@ Pirates	4–2	**Mulder** (7–4)	Fogg (7–5)	**Koch** (16)	21,943	38–31	W2
70	June 19	@ Pirates	3–2 (10)	**Bradford** (3–1)	Williams (1–2)	**Koch** (17)	30,562	39–31	W3
71	June 20	@ Pirates	5–3	**Hudson** (5–6)	Benson (0–4)	**Koch** (18)	22,464	40–31	W4
72	June 21	@ Reds	5–3	**Harang** (3–2)	Williamson (2–1)	**Koch** (19)	26,101	41–31	W5
73	June 22	@ Reds	10–3	**Zito** (10–2)	Chen (2–4)	—	27,243	42–31	W6
74	June 23	@ Reds	5–1	**Mulder** (8–4)	Reitsma (3–5)	—	23,961	43–31	W7
75	June 24	@ Mariners	13–2	**Lidle** (2–6)	García (10–5)	—	45,602	44–31	W8
76	June 25	@ Mariners	1–7	Baldwin (6–6)	**Hudson** (5–7)	—	43,985	44–32	L1
77	June 26	@ Mariners	0–1	Hasegawa (4–1)	**Bradford** (3–2)	Sasaki (18)	42,120	44–33	L2
78	June 27	@ Mariners	4–7	Halama (3–2)	**Zito** (10–3)	Rhodes (1)	42,159	44–34	L3
79	June 28	Giants	10–6	**Mulder** (9–4)	Hernández (6–9)	—	46,345	45–34	W1
80	June 29	Giants	3–5	Schmidt (4–2)	**Lidle** (2–7)	Nen (21)	53,501	45–35	L1
81	June 30	Giants	7–0	**Hudson** (6–7)	Ortiz (6–5)	—	54,123	46–35	W1

July: 15–12 (Home: 8–7; Away: 7–5)

#	Date	Opponent	Score	Win	Loss	Save	Attendance	Record	Streak
82	July 1	Twins	4–5	Romero (4–1)	**Venafro** (2–2)	Guardado (25)	13,503	46–36	L1
83	July 2	Twins	4–3	**Bradford** (4–2)	Guardado (1–2)	—	15,317	47–36	W1
84	July 3	Twins	1–2	Santana (4–1)	**Mulder** (9–5)	Guardado (26)	30,213	47–37	L1
85	July 4	Royals	3–2	**Koch** (5–0)	Hernández (1–1)	—	28,315	48–37	W1
86	July 5	Royals	4–3	**Mecir** (3–1)	Hernández (1–2)	—	53,802	49–37	W2
87	July 6	Royals	3–4 (10)	Mullen (1–2)	**Koch** (5–1)	Voyles (1)	18,259	49–38	L1
88	July 7	Royals	3–2	**Zito** (11–3)	Byrd (11–6)	**Koch** (20)	31,676	50–38	W1
**All–Star Break (July 8–10)**
89	July 11	@ Orioles	4–1	**Mulder** (10–5)	Erickson (3–9)	**Koch** (21)	32,507	51–38	W2
90	July 12	@ Orioles	1–0	**Hudson** (7–7)	Johnson (3–6)	**Koch** (22)	33,366	52–38	W3
91	July 13	@ Orioles	6–0	**Zito** (12–3)	Driskill (6–2)	—	36,100	53–38	W4
92	July 14	@ Orioles	3–6	López (9–3)	**Lidle** (2–8)	Julio (18)	32,853	53–39	L1
93	July 15	@ Devil Rays	4–0	**Lilly** (4–6)	Rupe (5–10)	—	10,116	54–39	W1
94	July 16	@ Devil Rays	2–1	**Mulder** (11–5)	Sosa (0–2)	**Koch** (23)	10,592	55–39	W2
95	July 17	Angels	4–10	Appier (8–7)	**Hudson** (7–8)	—	38,547	55–40	L1
96	July 18	Angels	2–0	**Zito** (13–3)	Sele (7–7)	**Koch** (24)	15,733	56–40	W1
97	July 19	Rangers	10–0	**Lidle** (3–8)	Myette (0–1)	—	21,445	57–40	W2
98	July 20	Rangers	6–5	**Koch** (6–1)	Burba (4–5)	—	31,129	58–40	W3
99	July 21	Rangers	3–7 (12)	Powell (2–1)	**Mecir** (3–2)	—	27,567	58–41	L1
100	July 23	@ Angels	2–1	**Zito** (14–3)	Appier (8–8)	**Koch** (25)	25,370	59–41	W1
101	July 24	@ Angels	1–5	Sele (8–7)	**Hudson** (7–9)	—	25,240	59–42	L1
102	July 25	@ Angels	4–5	Shields (3–1)	**Mecir** (3–3)	Weber (5)	31,653	59–43	L2
103	July 26	@ Rangers	4–12	Rodriguez (1–1)	**Mulder** (11–6)	—	34,585	59–44	L3
104	July 27	@ Rangers	6–10 (10)	Kolb (1–0)	**Koch** (6–2)	—	35,359	59–45	L4
105	July 28	@ Rangers	12–2	**Zito** (15–3)	Alvarez (0–3)	—	24,022	60–45	W1
106	July 29	Indians	6–8	Mulholland (1–0)	**Magnante** (0–2)	Wohlers (1)	18,297	60–46	L1
107	July 30	Indians	4–5	Drese (9–8)	**Lidle** (3–9)	Wohlers (2)	14,737	60–47	L2
108	July 31	Indians	6–4	**Mulder** (12–6)	Westbrook (0–1)	**Koch** (26)	47,574	61–47	W1

August: 24–4 (Home: 10–2; Away: 14–2)

#	Date	Opponent	Score	Win	Loss	Save	Attendance	Record	Streak
109	August 1	Tigers	5–3	**Bowie** (1–0)	Sparks (5–11)	**Koch** (27)	13,861	62–47	W2
110	August 2	Tigers	1–3	Redman (7–9)	**Zito** (15–4)	Acevedo (19)	17,197	62–48	L1
111	August 3	Tigers	8–4	**Hudson** (8–9)	Lima (2–5)	—	29,648	63–48	W1
112	August 4	Tigers	4–0	**Lidle** (4–9)	Maroth (3–4)	—	24,546	64–48	W2
113	August 6	@ Red Sox	9–1	**Mulder** (13–6)	Wakefield (5–4)	—	34,059	65–48	W3
114	August 7	@ Red Sox	3–2	**Harang** (4–2)	Burkett (10–5)	**Koch** (28)	33,325	66–48	W4
115	August 8	@ Red Sox	2–4	Lowe (16–5)	**Zito** (15–5)	Urbina (26)	33,855	66–49	L1
116	August 9	@ Yankees	3–2 (16)	**Bowie** (2–0)	Hitchcock (1–1)	—	54,316	67–49	W1
117	August 10	@ Yankees	8–0	**Lidle** (5–9)	Wells (12–6)	—	54,439	68–49	W2
118	August 11	@ Yankees	5–8	Mussina (14–6)	**Mulder** (13–7)	—	54,703	68–50	L1
119	August 12	Blue Jays	1–2	Loaiza (5–6)	**Harang** (4–3)	Escobar (24)	14,178	68–51	L2
120	August 13	Blue Jays	5–4	**Zito** (16–5)	Carpenter (4–5)	**Koch** (29)	17,466	69–51	W1
121	August 14	Blue Jays	4–2	**Hudson** (9–9)	Walker (5–3)	**Koch** (30)	40,528	70–51	W2
122	August 16	White Sox	1–0	**Lidle** (6–9)	Buehrle (15–9)	**Koch** (31)	22,622	71–51	W3
123	August 17	White Sox	9–2	**Mulder** (14–7)	Garland (8–9)	—	40,658	72–51	W4
124	August 18	White Sox	7–4	**Zito** (17–5)	Wright (8–11)	—	31,489	73–51	W5
125	August 19	@ Indians	8–1	**Hudson** (10–9)	Báez (9–10)	—	27,696	74–51	W6
126	August 20	@ Indians	6–3	**Harang** (5–3)	Westbrook (1–2)	**Koch** (32)	27,527	75–51	W7
127	August 21	@ Indians	6–0	**Lidle** (7–9)	Rodríguez (0–1)	—	26,916	76–51	W8
128	August 22	@ Indians	9–3	**Mulder** (15–7)	Phillips (1–2)	**Bradford** (2)	27,759	77–51	W9
129	August 23	@ Tigers	9–1	**Zito** (18–5)	Powell (1–3)	—	21,807	78–51	W10
130	August 24	@ Tigers	12–3	**Hudson** (11–9)	Lima (4–6)	—	19,045	79–51	W11
131	August 25	@ Tigers	10–7	**Mecir** (4–3)	Walker (1–1)	**Koch** (33)	24,346	80–51	W12
132	August 26	@ Royals	6–3	**Lidle** (8–9)	May (3–9)	**Koch** (34)	11,096	81–51	W13
133	August 27	@ Royals	6–4	**Mulder** (16–7)	Hernández (3–3)	**Koch** (35)	13,077	82–51	W14
134	August 28	@ Royals	7–1	**Zito** (19–5)	Sedlacek (3–4)	—	15,952	83–51	W15
135	August 30	Twins	4–2	**Hudson** (12–9)	Radke (6–4)	**Koch** (36)	25,221	84–51	W16
136	August 31	Twins	6–3	**Mecir** (5–3)	Romero (8–2)	**Koch** (37)	42,841	85–51	W17

September: 18–8 (Home: 11–2; Away: 7–6)

#	Date	Opponent	Score	Win	Loss	Save	Attendance	Record	Streak
137	September 1	Twins	7–5	**Koch** (7–2)	Guardado (1–3)	—	37,676	86–51	W18
138	September 2	Royals	7–6	**Koch** (8–2)	Grimsley (3–5)	—	26,325	87–51	W19
139	September 4	Royals	12–11	**Koch** (9–2)	Grimsley (3–6)	—	55,528	88–51	W20
140	September 6	@ Twins	0–6	Radke (7–4)	**Lidle** (8–10)	—	27,409	88–52	L1
141	September 7	@ Twins	2–0	**Mulder** (17–7)	Mays (3–6)	**Koch** (38)	43,628	89–52	W1
142	September 8	@ Twins	6–0	**Zito** (20–5)	Milton (13–8)	—	20,102	90–52	W2
143	September 9	@ Angels	2–1	**Hudson** (13–9)	Appier (14–10)	**Koch** (39)	28,145	91–52	W3
144	September 10	@ Angels	2–5	Ortiz (13–9)	**Lilly** (4–7)	Percival (36)	35,323	91–53	L1
145	September 11	@ Angels	5–6	Shields (4–3)	**Tam** (0–1)	Percival (37)	34,302	91–54	L2
146	September 12	@ Angels	6–7	Donnelly (1–1)	**Koch** (9–3)	—	31,304	91–55	L3
147	September 13	Mariners	5–0	**Zito** (21–5)	Valdez (8–11)	—	38,210	92–55	W1
148	September 14	Mariners	1–0	**Hudson** (14–9)	Moyer (13–8)	—	40,309	93–55	W2
149	September 15	Mariners	3–6	Piñeiro (14–6)	**Harang** (5–4)	Sasaki (35)	38,783	93–56	L1
150	September 16	Angels	4–3	**Koch** (10–3)	Levine (4–4)	—	22,326	94–56	W1
151	September 17	Angels	0–1 (10)	Weber (7–2)	**Koch** (10–4)	Percival (40)	25,894	94–57	L1
152	September 18	Angels	7–4	**Zito** (22–5)	Callaway (1–1)	**Koch** (40)	50,730	95–57	W1
153	September 19	Angels	5–3	**Hudson** (15–9)	Appier (14–11)	**Koch** (41)	27,435	96–57	W2
154	September 20	Rangers	4–2	**Mecir** (6–3)	Kolb (3–5)	**Rincón** (1)	25,281	97–57	W3
155	September 21	Rangers	6–3	**Tam** (1–1)	Nitkowski (0–1)	**Koch** (42)	24,862	98–57	W4
156	September 22	Rangers	7–5	**Mulder** (18–7)	Park (9–7)	**Koch** (43)	35,697	99–57	W5
157	September 24	@ Mariners	7–8	Hasegawa (8–2)	**Tam** (1–2)	Rhodes (2)	39,037	99–58	L1
158	September 25	@ Mariners	2–3	Rhodes (10–4)	**Mecir** (6–4)	Sasaki (37)	39,776	99–59	L2
159	September 26	@ Mariners	5–3 (10)	**Koch** (11–4)	Hasegawa (8–3)	—	45,822	100–59	W1
160	September 27	@ Rangers	3–2	**Mulder** (19–7)	Park (9–8)	**Koch** (44)	31,521	101–59	W2
161	September 28	@ Rangers	10–8	**Lilly** (5–7)	Kolb (3–6)	**Mecir** (1)	44,442	102–59	W3
162	September 29	@ Rangers	8–7	**Zito** (23–5)	Benoit (4–5)	—	34,529	103–59	W4

Legend: = Win = Loss = Postponement
Bold = Athletics team member Source: baseball-reference.com

=== Season standings ===
AL West
Team	W	L	Pct.	GB	Home	Road
Oakland Athletics	103	59	.636	—	54‍–‍27	49‍–‍32
Anaheim Angels	99	63	.611	4	54‍–‍27	45‍–‍36
Seattle Mariners	93	69	.574	10	48‍–‍33	45‍–‍36
Texas Rangers	72	90	.444	31	42‍–‍39	30‍–‍51

Division leaders
Team	W	L	Pct.
New York Yankees	103	58	.640
Minnesota Twins	94	67	.584
Oakland Athletics	103	59	.636

Wild Card team (Top team qualifies for postseason)
Team	W	L	Pct.	GB
Anaheim Angels	99	63	.611	—
Boston Red Sox	93	69	.574	6
Seattle Mariners	93	69	.574	6
Chicago White Sox	81	81	.500	18
Toronto Blue Jays	78	84	.481	21
Cleveland Indians	74	88	.457	25
Texas Rangers	72	90	.444	27
Baltimore Orioles	67	95	.414	32
Kansas City Royals	62	100	.383	37
Detroit Tigers	55	106	.342	43½
Tampa Bay Devil Rays	55	106	.342	43½

=== Record vs. opponents ===
2002 American League record Source: MLB Standings Grid – 2002
Team	ANA	BAL	BOS	CWS	CLE	DET	KC	MIN	NYY	OAK	SEA	TB	TEX	TOR	NL
Anaheim	—	7–2	3–4	6–3	6–3	8–1	6–3	4–5	3–4	9–11	9–10	8–1	12–7	7–2	11–7
Baltimore	2–7	—	6–13	3–4	1–5	2–4	7–0	5–1	6–13	4–5	5–4	10–9	3–6	4–15	9–9
Boston	4–3	13–6	—	2–4	5–4	5–4	4–2	3–3	9–10	6–3	4–5	16–3	4–3	13–6	5–13
Chicago	3–6	4–3	4–2	—	9–10	12–7	11–8	8–11	2–4	2–7	5–4	4–3	5–4	4–2	8–10
Cleveland	3–6	5–1	4–5	10–9	—	10–9	9–10	8–11	3–6	2–5	3–4	4–2	4–5	3–3	6–12
Detroit	1–8	4–2	4–5	7–12	9–10	—	9–10	4–14	1–8	1–6	2–5	2–4	5–4	0–6	6–12
Kansas City	3–6	0–7	2–4	8–11	10–9	10–9	—	5–14	1–5	1–8	3–6	4–2	7–2	3–4	5–13
Minnesota	5–4	1–5	3–3	11–8	11–8	14–4	14–5	—	0–6	3–6	5–4	5–2	6–3	6–1	10–8
New York	4–3	13–6	10–9	4–2	6–3	8–1	5–1	6–0	—	5–4	4–5	13–5	4–3	10–9	11–7
Oakland	11–9	5–4	3–6	7–2	5–2	6–1	8–1	6–3	4–5	—	8–11	8–1	13–6	3–6	16–2
Seattle	10–9	4–5	5–4	4–5	4–3	5–2	6–3	4–5	5–4	11–8	—	5–4	13–7	6–3	11–7
Tampa Bay	1–8	9–10	3–16	3–4	2–4	4–2	2–4	2–5	5–13	1–8	4–5	—	4–5	8–11	7–11
Texas	7–12	6–3	3–4	4–5	5–4	4–5	2–7	3–6	3–4	6–13	7–13	5–4	—	8–1	9–9
Toronto	2–7	15–4	6–13	2–4	3–3	6–0	4–3	1–6	9–10	6–3	3–6	11–8	1–8	—	9–9

=== Draft picks (first round) ===
The following were drafted in the first round of the 2002 MLB draft by the Athletics on June 4, 2002:

- Nick Swisher (16th pick, compensatory)
- Joe Blanton (24th pick, compensatory)
- John McCurdy (26th pick)
- Benjamin Fritz (30th pick, compensatory)
- Jeremy Brown (35th pick, compensatory)
- Mark Teahen (39th pick, compensatory)

=== Trades ===
- May 22, 2002: John Mabry was traded by the Philadelphia Phillies to the Oakland Athletics for Jeremy Giambi.
- June 21, 2002: Bob Ryan was traded to the Boston Red Sox for cash considerations.
- July 5, 2002: Jeff Weaver was traded by the Detroit Tigers to the New York Yankees, and cash was sent by the Tigers to the Oakland Athletics, as part of a 3-team trade. The Athletics sent Carlos Peña, Franklyn Germán, and a player to be named later to the Tigers. The Yankees sent Ted Lilly, John-Ford Griffin, and Jason Arnold (minors) to the Athletics. The Athletics completed the trade by sending Jeremy Bonderman to the Tigers on August 22, 2002.
- July 25, 2002: Ray Durham was traded by the Chicago White Sox to the Oakland Athletics with cash for Jon Adkins.
- July 30, 2002: Ricardo Rincón was traded by the Cleveland Indians to the Oakland Athletics for Marshall McDougall.

=== Roster ===
2002 Oakland Athletics
**Roster**
**Pitchers**: 57 Micah Bowie; 53 Chad Bradford; 49 Mike Fyhrie; 56 Aaron Harang; 37 Erik Hiljus; 31 Mike Holtz; 15 Tim Hudson; 44 Billy Koch; 21 Cory Lidle; 31 Ted Lilly; 52 Mike Magnante; 45 Jim Mecir; 20 Mark Mulder; 73 Ricardo Rincón; 29 Jeff Tam; 33 Mike Venafro; 75 Barry Zito	**Catchers**: 55 Ramón Hernández; 26 Cody McKay; 28 Greg Myers; **Infielders**: 3 Eric Chavez; 5 Ray Durham; 14 Mark Ellis; 30 Jose Flores; 40 Esteban Germán; 10 Scott Hatteberg; 11 Frank Menechino; 2 Carlos Peña; 9 Olmedo Sáenz; 19 Larry Sutton; 4 Miguel Tejada; 8 Randy Velarde	**Outfielders**: 22 Eric Byrnes; 30 Mike Colangelo; 24 Jermaine Dye; 7 Jeremy Giambi; 2 Jason Grabowski; 23 David Justice; 12 Terrence Long; 47 John Mabry; 6 Adam Piatt	**Manager**: 18 Art Howe; **Coaches**: 41 Thad Bosley (Hitting); 35 Brad Fischer (Bullpen); 39 Ken Macha (Bench); 47 Rick Peterson (Pitching); 48 Mike Quade (First Base); 38 Ron Washington (Third Base)

== Postseason ==
The Athletics clinched the American League West with a regular season record of 103–59, advancing to the first round of the postseason. They were defeated in the 2002 American League Division Series three games to two by the American League Central champion Minnesota Twins. The Twins would later be defeated in the 2002 American League Championship Series by the eventual World Series champion Anaheim Angels.

=== Postseason game log ===
2002 Postseason Game Log (2–3)
2002 AL Division Series vs. Minnesota Twins: Athletics lose 2–3

#	Date	Opponent	Score	Win	Loss	Save	Attendance	Series
1	October 1	Twins	5–7	Radke (1–0)	**Lilly** (0–1)	Guardado (1)	34,853	MIN 1–0
2	October 2	Twins	9–1	**Mulder** (1–0)	Mays (0–1)	—	31,953	Tied 1–1
3	October 4	@ Twins	6–3	**Zito** (1–0)	Reed (0–1)	**Koch** (1)	55,932	OAK 2–1
4	October 5	@ Twins	2–11	Milton (1–0)	**Hudson** (0–1)	—	55,960	Tied 2–2
5	October 6	Twins	4–5	Radke (2–0)	**Mulder** (1–1)	—	32,146	MIN 3–2

Legend: = Win = Loss = Postponement
Bold = Athletics team member Source: baseball-reference.com

== Player statistics ==
=== Pitching ===
Note: POS = Position; G = Games pitched; IP = Innings pitched; W = Wins; L = Losses; SV = Saves; ERA = Earned run average; SO = Strikeouts

Player	POS	G	IP	W	L	SV	ERA	SO
Tim Hudson	SP	34	238.1	15	9	0	2.98	152
Barry Zito	SP	35	229.1	23	5	0	2.75	182
Mark Mulder	SP	30	207.1	19	7	0	3.47	159
Cory Lidle	SP	31	192.0	8	10	0	3.89	111
Billy Koch	CP	84	93.2	11	4	44	3.27	93
Aaron Harang	SP	16	78.1	5	4	0	4.83	64
Chad Bradford	RP	75	75.1	4	2	2	3.11	56
Jim Mecir	RP	61	67.2	6	4	1	4.26	53
Jeff Tam	RP	40	40.1	1	2	0	5.13	14
Mike Fyhrie	RP/SP	16	48.2	2	4	0	4.44	29
Erik Hiljus	RP/SP	9	45.2	3	3	0	6.50	29
Mike Venafro	RP	47	37.0	2	2	0	4.62	16
Mike Magnante	RP	32	28.2	0	2	0	5.97	11
Ted Lilly	RP/SP	6	23.1	2	1	0	4.63	18
Ricardo Rincón	RP	25	20.1	0	0	1	3.10	19
Mike Holtz	RP	16	14.0	0	0	0	6.43	7
Micah Bowie	RP	13	12.0	2	0	0	1.50	8
Team Totals			1452.0	103	59	48	3.68	1021
AL Ranking / 14			2	1	13	4	1	7

=== Batting ===
Note: POS = Position; G = Games played; AB = At bats; AVG = Batting average; OBP = On base percentage; H = Hits; 2B = Doubles; 3B = Triples; HR = Home runs; RBI = Runs batted in

Player	POS	G	AB	AVG	OBP	H	2B	3B	HR	RBI
Ramón Hernández	C	136	403	.233	.313	94	20	0	7	42
Scott Hatteberg	1B	136	492	.280	.374	138	22	4	15	61
Mark Ellis	2B	98	345	.272	.359	94	16	4	6	35
Eric Chavez	3B	153	585	.275	.348	161	31	3	34	109
Miguel Tejada	SS	162	662	.308	.354	204	30	0	34	131
David Justice	LF	118	398	.266	.376	106	18	3	11	49
Terrence Long	CF	162	587	.240	.298	141	32	4	16	67
Jermaine Dye	RF	131	488	.252	.333	123	27	1	24	86
Ray Durham	DH	54	219	.274	.350	60	14	4	6	22
John Mabry	LF	89	193	.275	.322	53	13	1	11	40
Jeremy Giambi	LF	42	157	.274	.390	43	7	0	8	17
Olmedo Sáenz	1B	68	156	.276	.354	43	10	1	6	18
Greg Myers	C	65	144	.222	.341	32	5	0	6	21
Randy Velarde	2B	56	133	.226	.325	30	8	0	2	8
Frank Menechino	2B	38	132	.312	.312	27	7	0	3	15
Adam Piatt	LF	55	137	.234	.303	32	8	0	5	18
Carlos Peña	1B	40	124	.218	.305	27	4	0	7	16
Eric Byrnes	UT	90	94	.245	.291	23	4	2	3	11
Esteban Germán	2B	9	35	.200	.300	7	0	0	0	0
Mike Colangelo	OF	20	23	.174	.240	4	1	0	0	0
Larry Sutton	UT	7	19	.105	.150	2	0	0	1	3
Jason Grabowski	LF	4	8	.375	.545	3	1	1	0	1
Jose Flores	UT	7	3	.000	.400	0	0	0	0	0
Cody McKay	C	2	3	.667	.500	2	0	0	0	2
Barry Zito	P	35	4	.000	.000	0	0	0	0	0
Tim Hudson	P	34	5	.200	.333	1	1	0	0	0
Mark Mulder	P	30	5	.000	.000	0	0	0	0	0
Aaron Harang	P	16	3	.000	.000	0	0	0	0	0
Cory Lidle	P	31	1	.000	.000	0	0	0	0	0
Team Totals			5558	.261	.339	1450	279	28	205	772
AL Ranking / 14			9	8	5	9	12	10	4	—

Note: Only players with at least one at-bat are listed.

== Farm system ==
Level	Team	League	Manager
AAA	Sacramento River Cats	Pacific Coast League	Bob Geren
AA	Midland RockHounds	Texas League	Tony DeFrancesco
A	Modesto A's	California League	Greg Sparks
A	Visalia Oaks	California League	Webster Garrison
A-Short Season	Vancouver Canadians	Northwest League	Orv Franchuk
Rookie	AZL Athletics	Arizona League	Ruben Escalera
