= Chad Bradford =

American baseball player (born 1974)

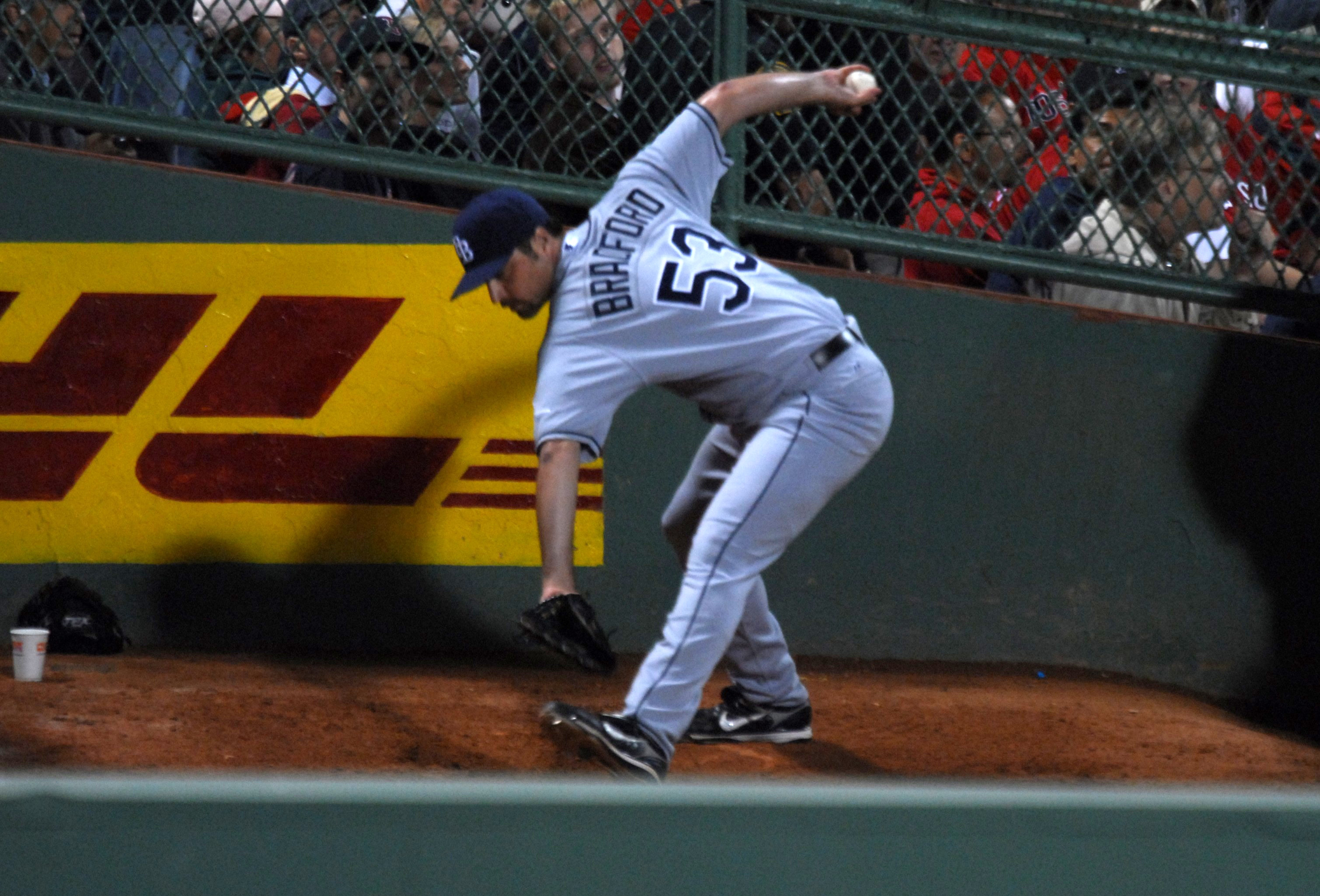
- Bradford with the Rays in 2008
- Pitcher
- Born: September 14, 1974 (age 51); Byram, Mississippi, U.S.
- Batted: Right Threw: Right

MLB debut
- August 1, 1998, for the Chicago White Sox

Last MLB appearance
- September 23, 2009, for the Tampa Bay Rays

MLB statistics
- Win–loss record: 36–28
- Earned run average: 3.26
- Strikeouts: 313
- Stats at Baseball Reference

Teams
- Chicago White Sox (1998–2000); Oakland Athletics (2001–2004); Boston Red Sox (2005); New York Mets (2006); Baltimore Orioles (2007–2008); Tampa Bay Rays (2008–2009)

Chadwick Lee Bradford (born September 14, 1974) is an American former professional baseball relief pitcher. He played in Major League Baseball (MLB) on the Chicago White Sox, Oakland Athletics, Boston Red Sox, New York Mets, Baltimore Orioles, and Tampa Bay Rays between 1998 and 2009.

Bradford was a submarine-style pitcher and his fastball was only in the mid 80-mph range. He figured prominently in the Michael Lewis book Moneyball, which in 2011 was made into the film of the same title. Bradford is played by actor Casey Bond in the film.

== Early life ==
Bradford was born in Byram, Mississippi. His father had suffered a stroke that left him partially paralyzed, so that he could only throw underhand when playing catch with his son. Author Michael Lewis speculates that memories of his father's throwing motion may have contributed to the development of Bradford's pitching style.

Bradford went to Byram High School. Unlike most players who become major leaguers, he had not exhibited outstanding athletic talent through the early years of high school. But his high school coach suggested he try sidearm pitching after learning some tips about the approach from a professional player. This technique brought him enough success to get a spot on the teams of Hinds Community College and the University of Southern Mississippi.

== Professional career ==
=== Chicago White Sox ===
The Chicago White Sox selected Bradford in the 34th round (957th overall) of the 1994 MLB draft, but he elected to stay in college through 1996. The White Sox—the only major league team that had even scouted him—re-drafted him in the 13th round (377th overall) of the 1996 MLB draft. He made his MLB debut on August 1, 1998 at the age of 23. In 29 games, Bradford was 2–1 with a 3.23 ERA and 11 strikeouts in 30.2 innings.

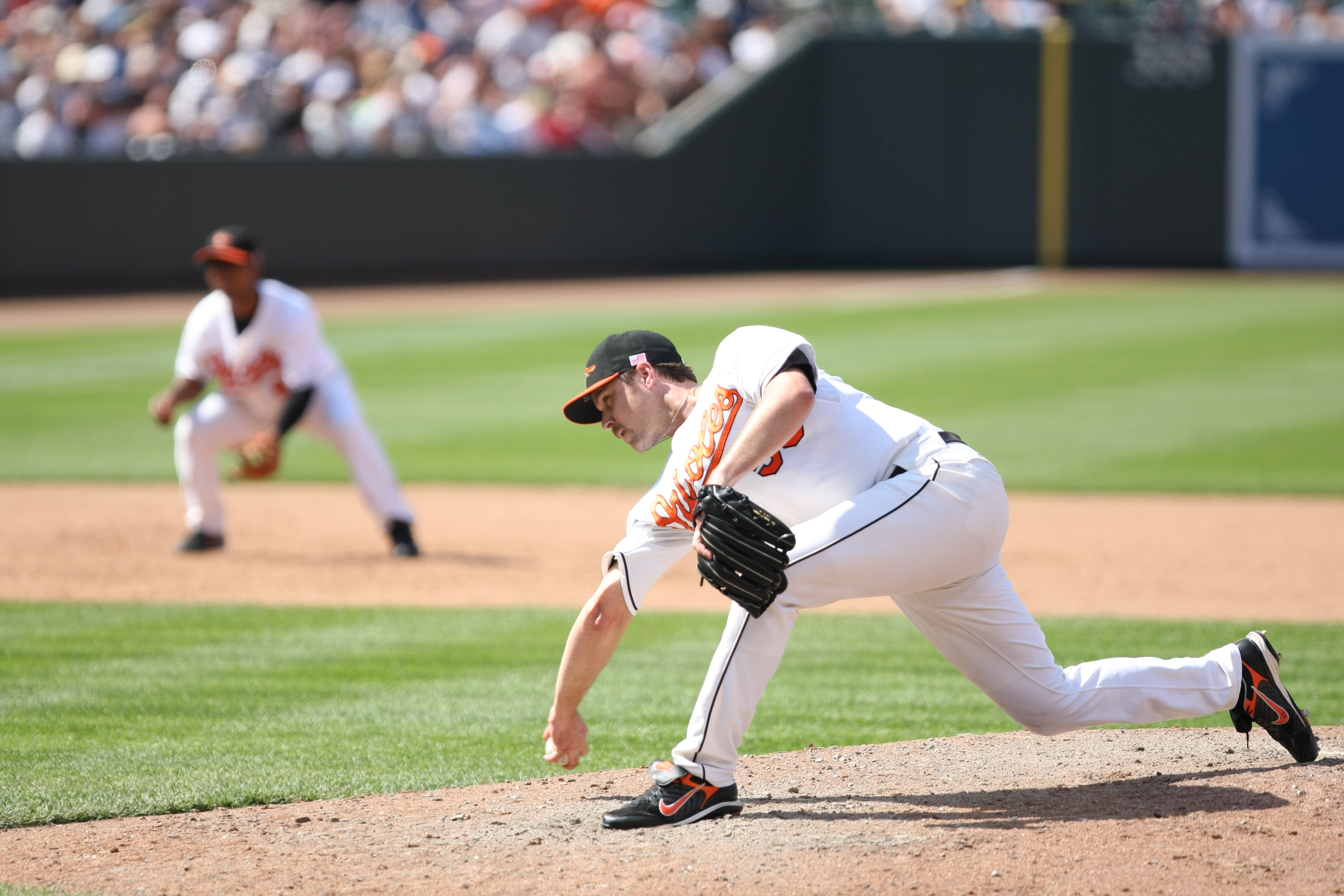
Bradford with the Baltimore Orioles

In 1999, Bradford made only three appearances in the majors while spending most of the season with the Triple-A Charlotte Knights. He was successful as a September call-up in 2000, going 1–0 with a 1.98 ERA in 12 relief appearances. He also pitched one game in the American League Division Series against the Seattle Mariners, pitching 0 2/3 scoreless innings as the White Sox lost the series.

=== Oakland Athletics ===
On December 7, 2000, the White Sox traded Bradford to the Oakland Athletics for catcher Miguel Olivo. From 2001 to 2004, Bradford was a specialty reliever for the Athletics, having success against right-handed hitters. Bradford was a part of the A's 20 consecutive game winning streak in 2002. His ERA stayed around 3.00 for his career until 2004, when mounting back pain forced him on to the disabled list.

=== Boston Red Sox ===
On July 13, 2005, the Boston Red Sox acquired Bradford from Oakland in a trade for outfielder Jay Payton. Bradford, on the disabled list since undergoing lower back surgery March 7, was activated after the All-Star break. In 31 appearances with Boston, Bradford went 2–1 and had a 3.86 ERA with a 1.414 WHIP in 23 1/3 innings. After the season, he became a free agent.

=== New York Mets ===
On December 27, 2005, Bradford signed a one-year, $1.4 million contract with the New York Mets, where he was reunited with Rick Peterson, his pitching coach from the Athletics. He had a very solid year in 2006 as a right-handed specialist out of the bullpen, going 4–2 with a 2.90 ERA in 70 games.

=== Baltimore Orioles ===
On November 28, 2006, Bradford signed a three-year, $10.5 million deal with the Baltimore Orioles. On May 31, 2008, Manny Ramirez hit his 500th career home run off of Bradford.

=== Tampa Bay Rays ===
On August 7, 2008, Bradford was traded to the Tampa Bay Rays for a player to be named later. With a lot of postseason experience under his belt, Bradford shone in the 2008 playoffs and played a big part in Tampa Bay's World Series run. Bradford pitched in the 2008 World Series, allowing only one hit in two innings for Tampa Bay.

Bradford remained with the Rays into 2009; however, he began the season on the disabled list after injuring his elbow in spring training. Bradford returned in June but shortly thereafter returned to the disabled list, this time after injuring his back while warming up. Bradford was sidelined again at the end of the season with various pains. When on the mound, he was of questionable effectiveness, allowing 22 hits in 10 innings. Largely because of recurring injuries, Bradford told the St. Petersburg Times after the season that he was considering retirement. With no media attention and no interest from MLB clubs, Bradford retired and went to work as a coach in Mississippi.

In 24 career postseason games, Bradford posted a 0.39 ERA, allowing just one run.

== Pitching style ==
Bradford was a finesse pitcher who specialized in pitching to contact, posting low strikeout and walk rates. Bradford's fastball, never faster than 85 mph, averaged a relatively low 80 mph in the later parts of his career. Bradford threw it more than half the time. Bradford's second pitch was a curveball that averaged just below 70 mph, while his third was a changeup.

Bradford held right-handed batters to just .588 OPS; however, left-handed hitters had .843 OPS and .408 on-base percentage against him. Bradford was used more against right-handed hitters, with left-handed hitters accounting for less than a third of Bradford's career total batters faced.

== Personal life ==
As of 2005, Bradford identified as an evangelical Christian.

Bradford's son, Keller, is now a college baseball coach at Liberty University after pitching for two years at the NCAA Division I level, including at Southern Miss.

== Sources ==
- Lewis, Michael (2003). Moneyball: the art of winning an unfair game (1st ed.). New York: W. W. Norton. ISBN 978-0-393-05765-2.
