= Scott Hatteberg =

American baseball player (born 1969)

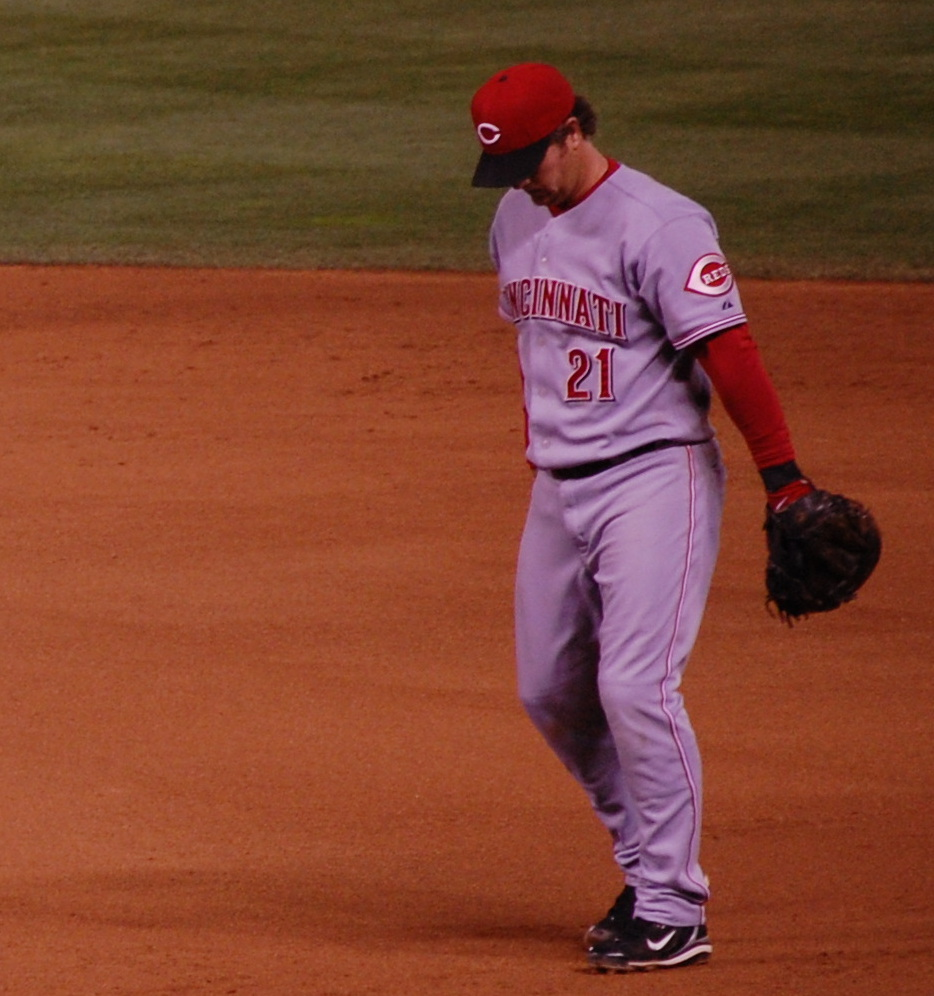
- Hatteberg in 2007
- First baseman / Catcher
- Born: December 14, 1969 (age 56); Salem, Oregon, U.S.
- Batted: Left Threw: Right

MLB debut
- September 8, 1995, for the Boston Red Sox

Last MLB appearance
- May 25, 2008, for the Cincinnati Reds

MLB statistics
- Batting average: .273
- Home runs: 106
- Runs batted in: 527
- Stats at Baseball Reference

Teams
- Boston Red Sox (1995–2001); Oakland Athletics (2002–2005); Cincinnati Reds (2006–2008)
Medals
Men's baseball
Representing United States
Goodwill Games
Bronze medal – third place	1990 Seattle	Team

Scott Allen Hatteberg (born December 14, 1969) is an American former professional first baseman and catcher. From 1995 through 2008, he played in Major League Baseball for the Boston Red Sox, Oakland Athletics, and Cincinnati Reds. Hatteberg attended Washington State University, where he played college baseball for the Cougars.

== Early life and career ==
Hatteberg was born in Salem, Oregon. He played Little League in his native Salem, Oregon, and Canby, Oregon, and Pony League and American Legion baseball in Yakima, Washington. Hatteberg graduated from Eisenhower High School in Yakima in 1988. He was most valuable player of the baseball team and also lettered in football. He was team captain his senior year and batted .570 with seven home runs.

Hatteberg attended Washington State University from 1989 through 1991 and played for the Washington State Cougars baseball team in the Pacific-10 Conference. The Cougars won the Pac-10 North all three years. He was captain and MVP in 1991 and as a catcher he formed a battery with future major leaguers John Olerud and Aaron Sele. Hatteberg played collegiate summer baseball in the Alaska Baseball League in 1989 and 1990. At Washington State, he was a member of the Alpha Gamma Rho fraternity.

Hatteberg was a member of the United States national baseball team. At the 1990 Goodwill Games, he hit a home run against the Mexico national team. In the 1990 Baseball World Cup, Hatteberg hit .292/.346/.417.

== Professional career ==
=== Boston Red Sox ===
The Boston Red Sox selected Hatteberg in the 1991 MLB draft with a sandwich pick between the first and second rounds as compensation from Kansas City Royals for the signing of Type A free agent Mike Boddicker.

Hatteberg made his major league debut with the Red Sox in 1995. In parts of seven seasons from 1995 through 2001, he hit 34 home runs and batted .267. On August 6, 2001, against the Texas Rangers, he became the only player in MLB history to hit into a triple play and hit a grand slam in his next at-bat. The bat he used for that game is now in the National Baseball Hall of Fame.

In Hatteberg's last season with the Red Sox, he ruptured a nerve in his elbow and tore a joint capsule, requiring surgery. The injury impaired his throwing ability and endangered his career as a catcher. On December 19 he was traded to the Colorado Rockies in exchange for Pokey Reese. Two days later, Colorado declined to offer Hatteberg salary arbitration and he became a free agent.

=== Oakland Athletics ===
The Oakland Athletics signed Hatteberg to a one-year contract with a $950,000 base salary plus incentives, the day after the Rockies declined to offer salary arbitration. Because his elbow injury reduced his ability to throw, he was asked to play first base.

Hatteberg's conversion from catcher to first baseman by the Athletics in 2002 is the subject of a chapter in the Michael Lewis book Moneyball. In that chapter, Oakland general manager Billy Beane said the team had pursued Hatteberg because of his high on-base percentage, which Athletics' management had determined was most often correlated with runs scored. According to Beane, it was one of the most affordable skills at that time for small-market clubs like the A's. Infield coach Ron Washington worked with Hatteberg to teach him the new position. Hatteberg was a part of the A's 20-game winning streak in 2002. A fictionalized version of Hatteberg (played by Chris Pratt) appears in the 2011 film Moneyball.

A career highlight for Hatteberg came that season on September 4; entering that day, the A's had won 19 straight games to tie the American League record. With their next game, against the Kansas City Royals, tied at 11 after the A's had blown an 11–0 lead, Hatteberg pinch-hit with one out and the bases empty in the bottom of the ninth inning. He drove a 1–0 pitch well over the right center field wall off Jason Grimsley for a walk-off home run to give the A's a 12–11 win and a then-American League record 20-game winning streak. This moment is depicted in the Moneyball film.

As an everyday player, Hatteberg helped the Athletics reach the playoffs twice, in 2002 and 2003. He hit 49 home runs and batted .269 from 2002 through 2005. He drove in 263 runs and had an on-base percentage of .355. In 2004, he hit .287, scored 87 runs, hit 15 home runs, drove in 82 runs, and had an on-base percentage of .367.

=== Cincinnati Reds ===
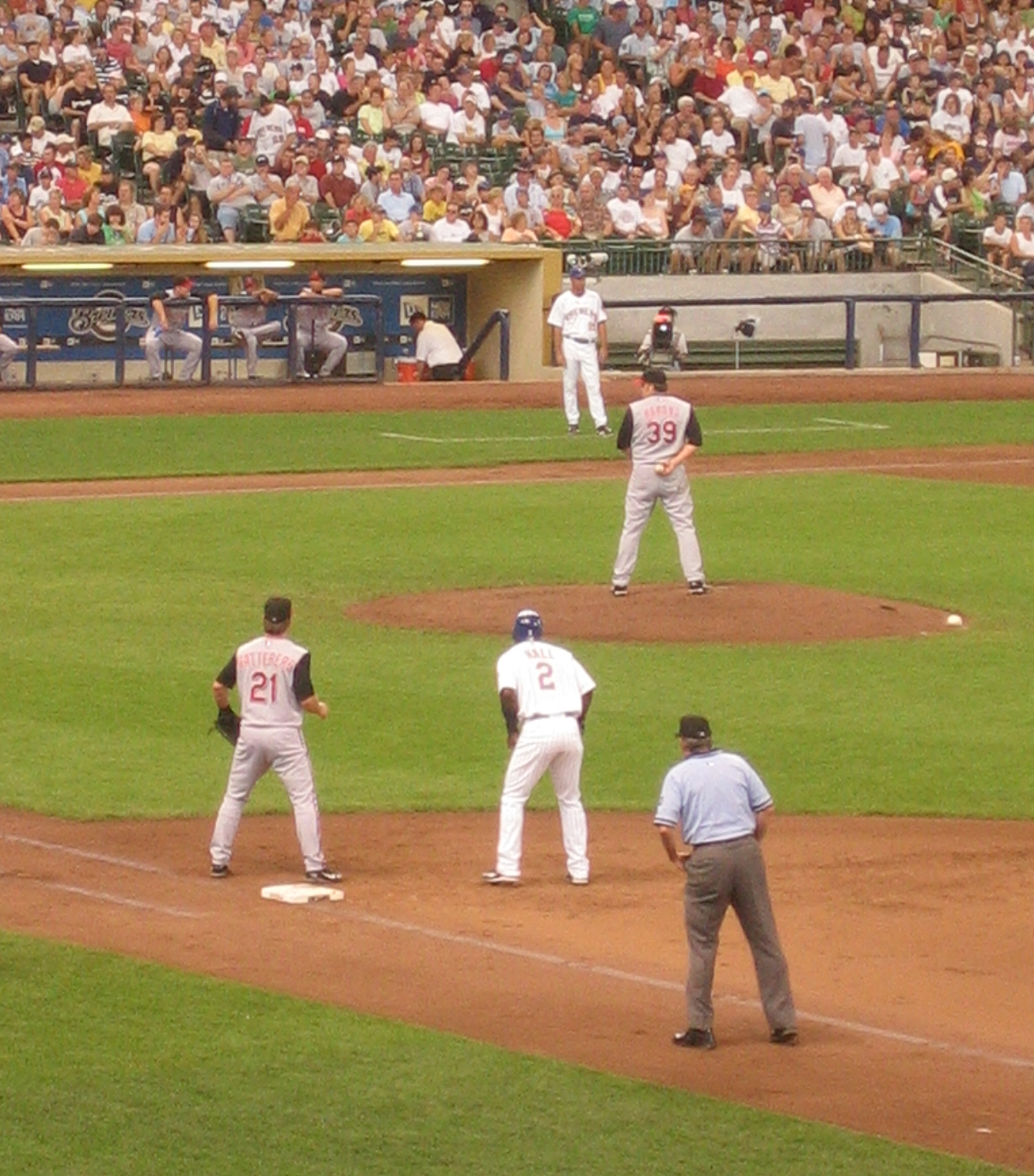
Hatteberg at first base holding on the runner Bill Hall during a July 2006 game in Milwaukee

On February 12, 2006, the Cincinnati Reds signed Hatteberg to a one-year, $750,000 contract. He was originally expected to give them flexibility at first base, backing up Adam Dunn. When the Reds traded Wily Mo Peña to the Red Sox, Dunn moved back to the outfield and Hatteberg was to play at first base, improving the Reds' defense.

On August 8, 2006, he recorded his 1,000th career hit against Jason Marquis of the St. Louis Cardinals at Great American Ball Park in Cincinnati. He went 3-for-5 in this game, increasing his batting average to .323.

During the first weeks of the 2008 season, he was relegated to pinch-hitting while rookie Joey Votto replaced him at first base. Hatteberg said it was a role in which he was not particularly comfortable, despite his 2002 walk-off homer for Oakland. On May 27, 2008, he was designated for assignment by the Reds to make room on the roster for top prospect Jay Bruce and officially released by the club on June 4.

=== Career statistics ===
In 1,314 games over 14 seasons, Hatteberg posted a .273 batting average (1153-for-4226) with 538 runs, 249 doubles, 7 triples, 106 home runs, 527 RBI, 562 bases on balls, .361 on-base percentage and .410 slugging percentage. He finished his career with a .992 fielding percentage playing at first base and catcher. In 17 postseason games, he hit .286 (12-for-42) with 9 runs, 2 doubles, 1 home run and 11 walks.

=== After retirement ===
Hatteberg serves as a Special Assistant to Baseball Operations for the Oakland Athletics. In the 2012 and 2013 seasons, Hatteberg substituted for Ray Fosse as the Oakland A's color commentator on TV broadcasts for a number of games.

== Personal life ==
He and his wife Elizabeth, nicknamed "Bitsy," have three daughters, Lauren, Sophia, and Ella. They reside in Gig Harbor, Washington. He is a self-taught guitar player and avid fly fisherman.

== Sources ==
- Lewis, Michael (August 22, 2011). Moneyball. W. W. Norton & Company. pp. 230–. ISBN 9780393341454.
