= Giambi (surname) =

Giambi is an Italian surname.

== Geographical distribution ==
As of 2014:

- 77.7% of all known bearers of the surname Giambi were residents of Italy (frequency 1:97,348);
- 10.6% of the United States (1:4,200,596);
- 8.4% of France (1:978,052); and
- 1.4% of Argentina (1:3,885,774).

In Italy, the frequency of the surname was higher than the national average (1:97,348) in the following regions:

1. Umbria (1:11,802)
2. Emilia-Romagna (1:21,451)
3. Lazio (1:22,924)
4. Tuscany (1:44,986)

== People ==
- Jason Giambi (born 1971), American professional baseball player; brother of Jeremy Giambi
- Jeremy Giambi (1974–2022), American professional baseball player; brother of Jason Giambi
