= Franchuk =

Surname list

Franchuk is a Ukrainian surname Франчук. Notable people with the surname include:

- Anatoliy Franchuk (1935–2021), Ukrainian politician
- Olena Franchuk (born 1970), Ukrainian philanthropist and businesswoman
- Orv Franchuk (born 1944), American college baseball player
