= Ron Washington =

American baseball player, coach, and manager (born 1952)

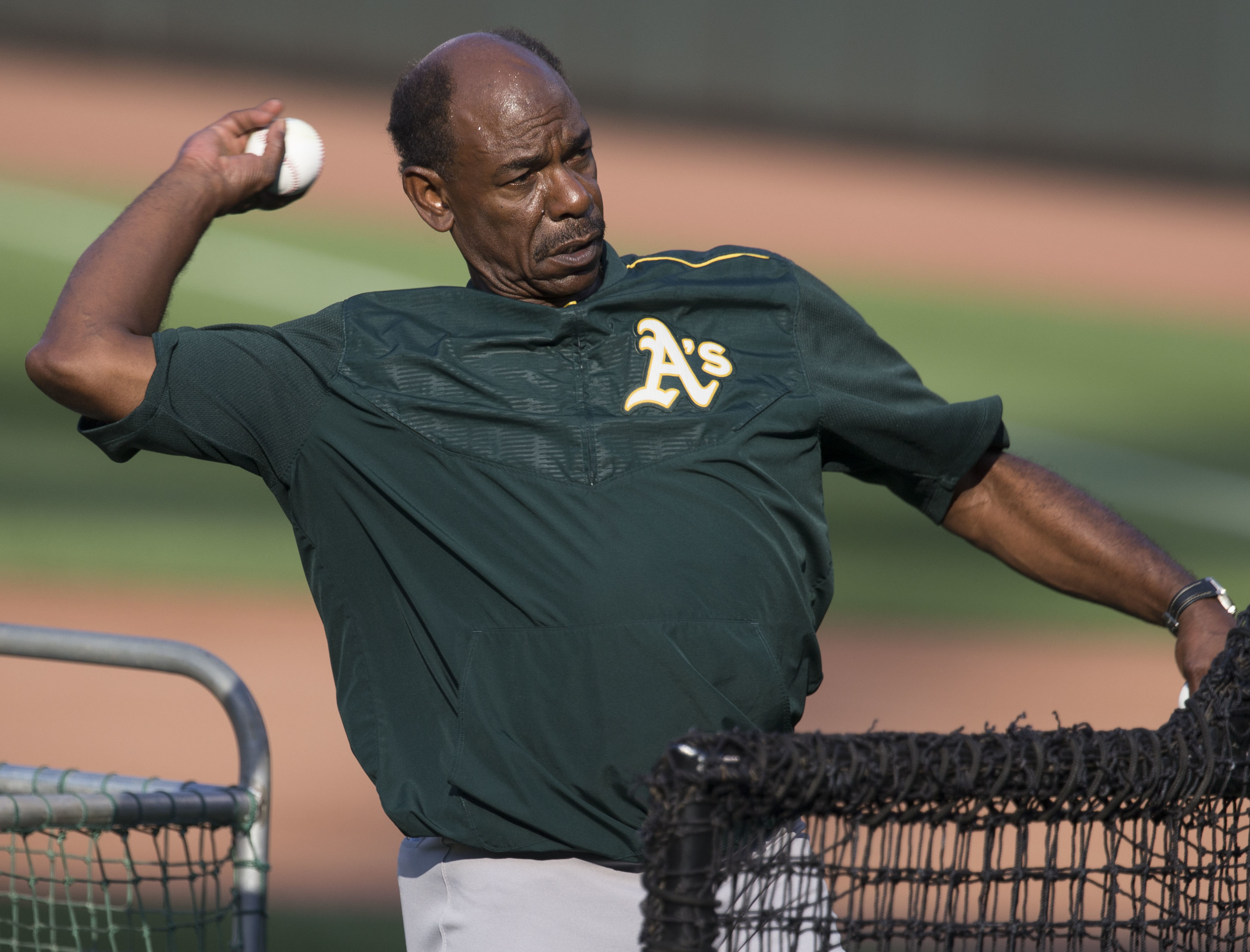
- Washington coaching the Oakland Athletics in 2015

San Francisco Giants – No. 37
- Infielder / Manager / Coach
- Born: April 29, 1952 (age 74); New Orleans, Louisiana, U.S.
- Batted: Right Threw: Right

MLB debut
- September 10, 1977, for the Los Angeles Dodgers

Last MLB appearance
- July 7, 1989, for the Houston Astros

MLB statistics
- Batting average: .261
- Home runs: 20
- Runs batted in: 146
- Managerial record: 799–800
- Winning %: .500
- Stats at Baseball Reference
- Managerial record at Baseball Reference

Teams
- As player: Los Angeles Dodgers (1977); Minnesota Twins (1981–1986); Baltimore Orioles (1987); Cleveland Indians (1988); Houston Astros (1989); As manager: Texas Rangers (2007–2014); Los Angeles Angels (2024–2025); As coach: Oakland Athletics (1996–2006, 2015–2016); Atlanta Braves (2017–2023); San Francisco Giants (2026–present)

Career highlights and awards
- World Series champion (2021)

Ronald Washington (born April 29, 1952) is an American professional baseball manager, coach, and former infielder who currently serves as the infield coach for the San Francisco Giants of Major League Baseball (MLB).

Washington played for the Los Angeles Dodgers, Minnesota Twins, Baltimore Orioles, Cleveland Indians, and Houston Astros over his career from 1977 to 1989. He was primarily a middle infielder, but also appeared at first base, center field, and left field. In his 10 seasons as a player, Washington had a batting average of .261 with 20 career home runs, 146 runs batted in, and 28 stolen bases.

After his playing career, Washington coached in the New York Mets and Oakland Athletics organizations. He served as manager of the Texas Rangers from 2007 to 2014, leading the team to the World Series in 2010 and 2011. He coached for the Oakland Athletics in 2015 and served as the third-base coach of the Atlanta Braves from 2016 to 2023. Washington won a World Series ring with the Braves in 2021.

== Playing career ==
Washington was signed by the Kansas City Royals on July 17, 1970. He spent the next ten seasons in the minor leagues with three different organizations (Royals, Mets, and Dodgers). He also played various seasons in the Mexican Pacific League during the winters throughout the 1970s and 1980s. He earned a brief September callup with the Los Angeles Dodgers in 1977 hitting .368 (7 for 19). He would not return to the major league level until 1981 with the Minnesota Twins, where he would remain until 1986. He then played one season each for the Baltimore Orioles, Cleveland Indians, and Houston Astros. He played in the Senior Professional Baseball Association in their inaugural 1989–90 season, and was named their most valuable player, before retiring from Triple-A Oklahoma City in 1990. He was a middle infielder for most of his career.

On May 28, 1988, while playing for the Indians, Washington broke up Milwaukee Brewers pitcher Odell Jones' no-hit bid after 8 1/3 innings with a pinch-hit single.

Washington is one of only 14 MLB players, along with U L Washington (no relation) and Frank White, who were products of the Royals Academy.

== Career as manager and coach ==
Following his retirement as a player, Washington worked in the New York Mets organization for five years. After being hired as the Oakland Athletics first base coach in 1996 under his former Astros manager Art Howe, Washington then served as infield and third base coach for the A's between 1997 and 2006. As infield coach Washington has been credited for developing much of the A's young infield talent in the last decade, including six-time Gold Glover Eric Chavez, and former MVP and A's shortstop Miguel Tejada. In 2004, Chavez expressed his appreciation by giving Washington one of his Gold Glove trophies, signed "Wash, not without you." However, the trophy was lost during Hurricane Katrina in August 2005.

Washington is portrayed in the book Moneyball that relates how the A's competed having a small budget. Washington is shown in a positive light for the way he trained Scott Hatteberg to field first base for the first time in his career, but also as both pragmatic and cynical in his reaction to the changes to the team brought about by general manager Billy Beane's sabermetric strategies. His character in the film adaptation of the book was played by actor Brent Jennings.

=== Manager of the Texas Rangers ===
On November 6, 2006, the Texas Rangers announced that Washington had accepted their offer to manage the team replacing Buck Showalter, who was fired a month earlier. Washington beat out four other candidates for the job: Rangers bench coach Don Wakamatsu, then New York Mets third base coach Manny Acta, Nippon Ham Fighters manager Trey Hillman and former Rangers catcher John Russell.

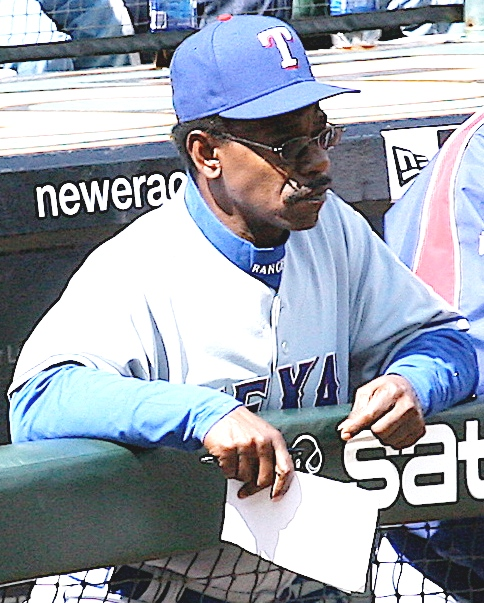
Ron Washington in 2007

At the beginning of the 2007 season, it was rumored that there was a rift between Washington and Rangers star Mark Teixeira. Asked about it, Washington responded that he wanted Teixeira and other players to take more pitches, especially when facing middle relievers.

Teixeira was traded to the Atlanta Braves in July 2007 and had been rumored to have been on the trading block before reports of tensions with Washington, as his agent, Scott Boras, had refused to negotiate a contract extension beyond the 2008 season. Reports also suggested tensions between Washington and catcher Gerald Laird. Questioned about the rumors, Washington conceded that the pressure he put on Laird was "a lot to put on a young kid ... (But) that's what we've got. He's got to grow up fast."

On March 17, 2010, Jon Heyman of Sports Illustrated reported that Washington tested positive for cocaine during the 2009 season and has acknowledged using cocaine.

In 2010, Washington became the second manager of the Rangers franchise (after Johnny Oates) to take his team to the postseason. On October 12, 2010, Washington became the first manager in franchise history to win a playoff series, with a 3–2 victory in the ALDS over the Tampa Bay Rays. On October 22, 2010, Washington's Rangers defeated the New York Yankees in the ALCS in six games, to advance to their first World Series in franchise history, before losing to the San Francisco Giants in five games. He also became the third African American to manage a team into a World Series, joining Cito Gaston, who managed the Toronto Blue Jays to the World Championship in the 1992 and 1993 World Series, and Dusty Baker, who managed the Giants in the 2002 World Series and the Astros in the 2022 World Series.

Referring to Washington, second baseman Ian Kinsler said: "I just love the way he never holds his emotion back, especially when he's managing. He hangs on every pitch, and it's great to know that your manager is in every single pitch and cares that much." In 2009 his salary was about $750,000. On November 4, 2010, Washington agreed to a two-year contract extension.

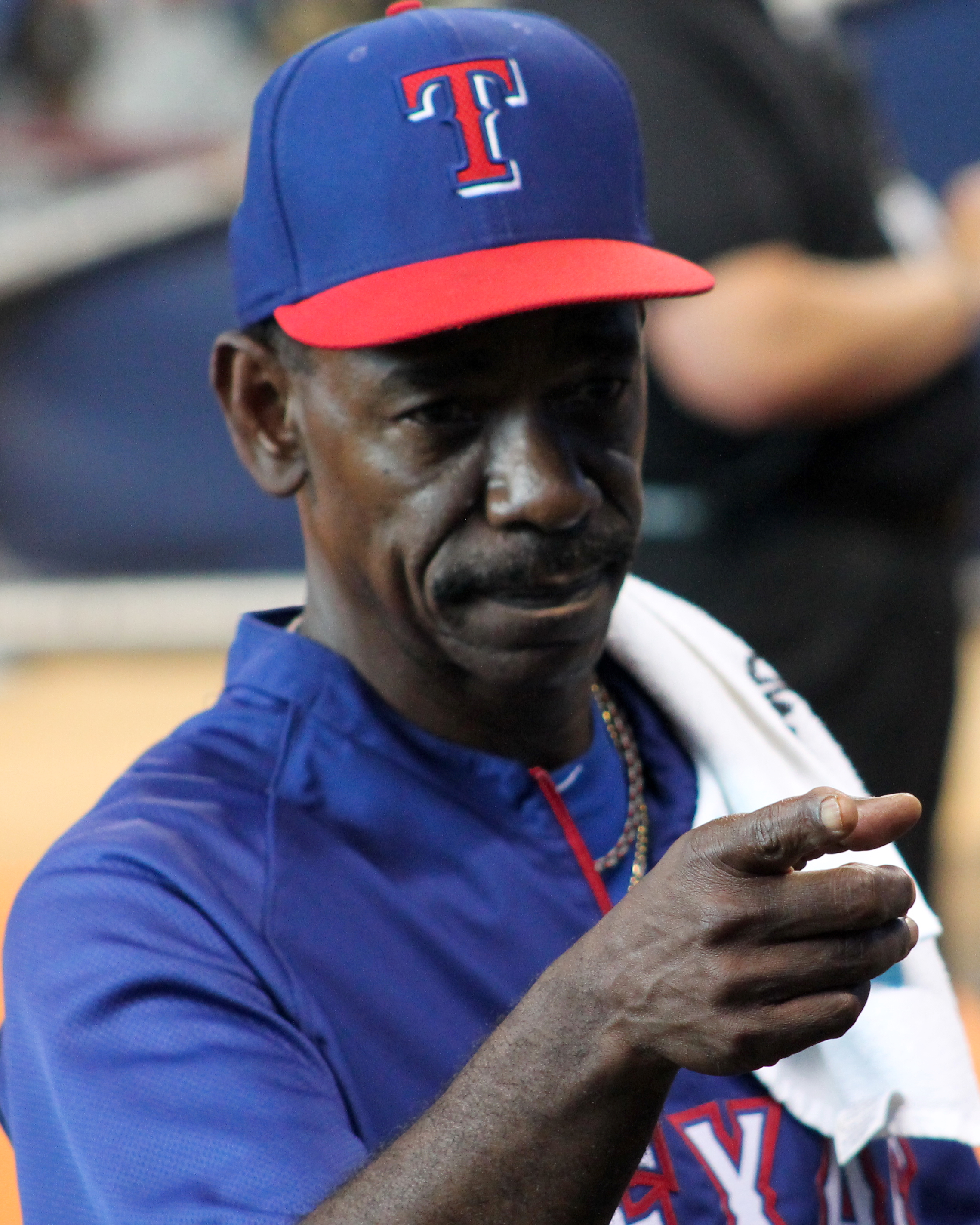
Washington talks to fans in Houston in August 2014

On October 15, 2011, Washington managed the Rangers to their second World Series in as many years, when the Rangers defeated the Detroit Tigers in the ALCS. The Rangers eventually lost to the St. Louis Cardinals in 7 games, after twice being one strike away from the title in game 6. On January 30, 2012, Washington agreed to another two-year contract extension. That year, he led the Rangers to a five-game lead in the race for the AL West title over the Oakland Athletics on September 24, but lost seven of the last nine games and the team was relegated to the inaugural AL Wild Card Game, which they lost 5–1 to the Baltimore Orioles.

On September 2, 2012, Washington earned his 507th win as a manager of the Texas Rangers, passing Johnny Oates for the second-most wins by a Rangers manager. On August 4, 2013, Washington passed Bobby Valentine for the most wins as a Rangers manager, at 582.

Following the conclusion of the 2014 season, Washington was supposed to travel to Japan, but was replaced by John Farrell, to manage a team of MLB All-Stars playing against All-Stars of Nippon Professional Baseball in the 2014 Major League Baseball Japan All-Star Series.

On September 5, 2014, Washington announced his resignation as manager of the Rangers, citing personal reasons. On September 11, 2014, it was announced by several media outlets that Washington's resignation may be related to allegations of sexual assault against a reporter. On September 18, 2014, Washington announced that he had been having an extramarital affair, and that he had resigned to reconcile with his family. Washington's managerial record with the Rangers was 664–611 (.521), including four consecutive 90-win seasons (2010–13), and two pennants. However, his 2014 squad was only 53–87 (.379).

=== Return to coaching ===
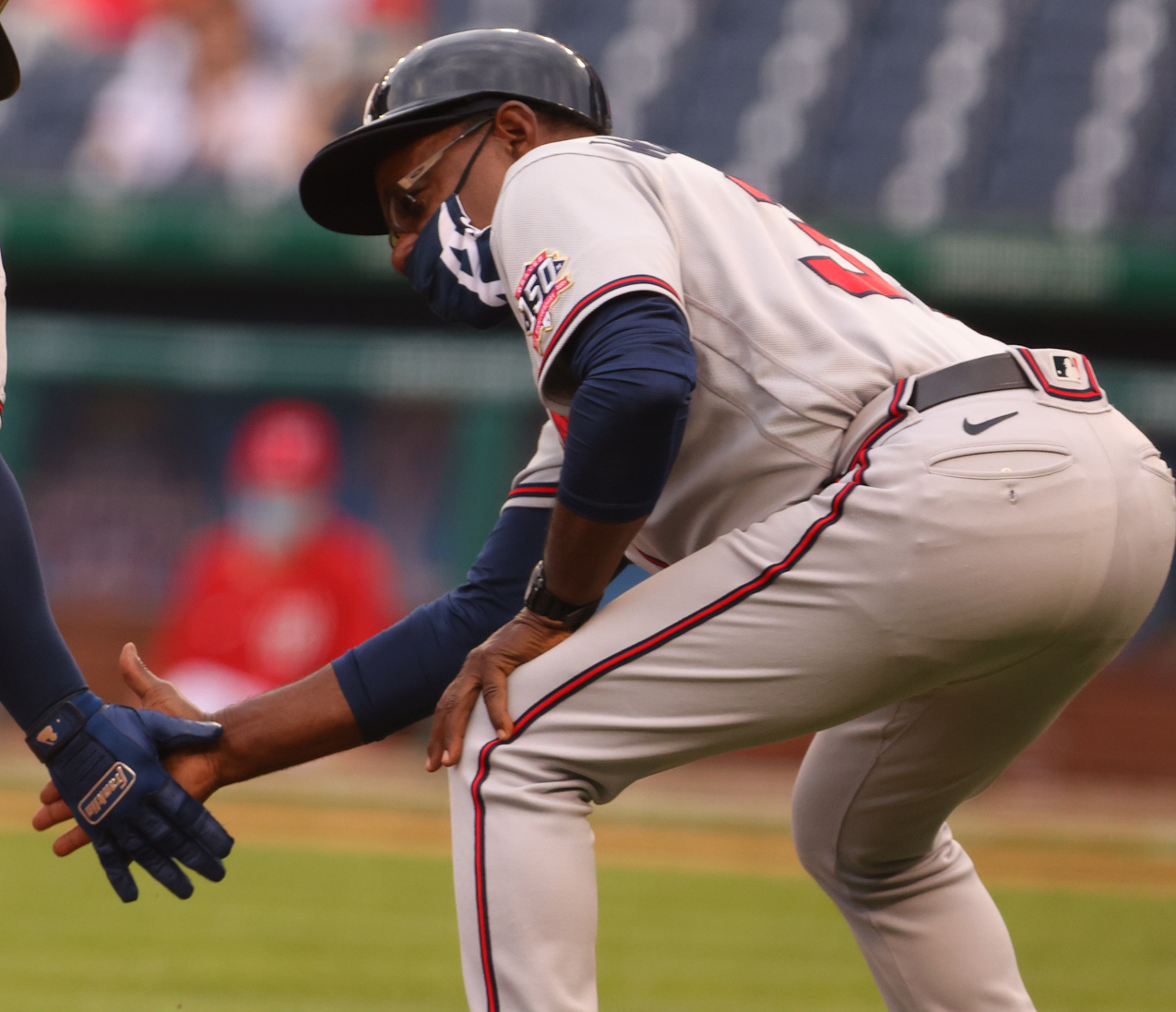
Washington as the third base coach for the Braves in 2021

Washington was hired as an infield coach by the Oakland Athletics on May 21, 2015. He became the Athletics' third base coach on August 24, 2015.

In October 2016, Washington was a finalist for the Atlanta Braves managerial vacancy. The Braves opted to promote interim manager Brian Snitker instead, and then announced the hiring of Washington as their new third base coach, replacing Bo Porter. Washington won his first World Series championship on November 2, 2021, as third-base coach for the Atlanta Braves. Washington remained the Braves' third-base coach through the 2023 season.

=== Manager of the Los Angeles Angels ===
After November 8, 2023, the Los Angeles Angels hired Washington as their manager. On June 20, 2025, it was announced that Washington would be out indefinitely due to health issues that later were determined to be season ending. On August 25, it was revealed that Washington had undergone a quadruple bypass procedure. At the end of the 2025 regular season, the Angels announced that Washington would not return as manager.

=== San Francisco Giants ===
On December 4, 2025, Washington was hired to serve as the infield coach for the San Francisco Giants.

== Managerial record ==
As of June 26, 2025

Team	Year	Regular season					Postseason			
Team	Year	Games	Won	Lost	Win %	Finish	Won	Lost	Win %	Result
TEX	2007	162	75	87	.463	4th in AL West	–	–	–	
TEX	2008	162	79	83	.488	2nd in AL West	–	–	–	
TEX	2009	162	87	75	.537	2nd in AL West	–	–	–	
TEX	2010	162	90	72	.556	1st in AL West	8	8	.500	Lost World Series (SF)
TEX	2011	162	96	66	.593	1st in AL West	10	7	.588	Lost World Series (STL)
TEX	2012	162	93	69	.574	2nd in AL West	0	1	.000	Lost ALWC (BAL)
TEX	2013	163	91	72	.558	2nd in AL West	–	–	–	
TEX	2014	140	53	87	.379	Resigned	–	–	–	
TEX Total		1,275	664	611	.521		18	16	.529	
LAA	2024	162	63	99	.389	5th in AL West	–	–	–	
LAA	2025	80	40	40	.500	(medical leave)	–	–	–	
LAA Total		242	103	139	.421		–	–	–	
Total		1,517	767	750	.506		18	16	.529	

Sporting positions
Preceded by Tommie Reynolds; Mike Gallego	Oakland Athletics third base coach 1996–2006; 2015–2016	Succeeded by Rene Lachemann; Chip Hale
Preceded by Buck Showalter	Texas Rangers manager 2007–2014	Succeeded by Jeff Banister
Preceded by Bo Porter	Atlanta Braves third base coach 2017–2023	Succeeded by Matt Tuiasosopo
Preceded by Phil Nevin	Los Angeles Angels manager 2023-2025	Succeeded by Kurt Suzuki
