= Jeremy Giambi =

American baseball player (1974–2022)

- Outfielder / First baseman
- Born: September 30, 1974; San Jose, California, U.S.
- Died: February 9, 2022 (aged 47); Claremont, California, U.S.
- Batted: Left Threw: Left

MLB debut
- September 1, 1998, for the Kansas City Royals

Last MLB appearance
- August 1, 2003, for the Boston Red Sox

MLB statistics
- Batting average: .263
- Home runs: 52
- Runs batted in: 209
- Stats at Baseball Reference

Teams
- Kansas City Royals (1998–1999); Oakland Athletics (2000–2002); Philadelphia Phillies (2002); Boston Red Sox (2003)

Jeremy Dean Giambi (/dʒiˈɑːmbi/; September 30, 1974 – February 9, 2022) was an American outfielder and first baseman who played in Major League Baseball (MLB) for six seasons from 1998 to 2003. Giambi was a member of four teams, most notably the Oakland Athletics. He also played for the Kansas City Royals, Philadelphia Phillies, and Boston Red Sox.

Giambi's most successful season was in 2001 a member of the Athletics team that won a division championship and advanced to the American League Division Series. Following the season, Giambi saw declining playtime and finished his career in the minor leagues.

== Early life ==
Jeremy Giambi was born in San Jose, California. Like his older brother Jason, Giambi attended South Hills High School in West Covina, California. He attended California State University, Fullerton and played college baseball for the Cal State Fullerton Titans, with whom he won the 1995 College World Series. In 1994, he played collegiate summer baseball with the Bourne Braves of the Cape Cod Baseball League and was named a league all-star.

== Professional career ==
The Kansas City Royals selected Giambi in the sixth round of the 1996 Major League Baseball draft. Giambi made his major league debut as a September call-up for the Royals in 1998. The Athletics acquired Giambi from the Royals in exchange for Brett Laxton before the 2000 season. Jason and Jeremy played together during the 2000 and 2001 seasons. During Game 3 of the 2001 American League Division Series, Giambi was tagged out at home plate on the "flip play" by Derek Jeter.

In 42 games for the Athletics in 2002, Giambi batted .274 with eight home runs and 17 RBIs before the Athletics traded him to the Philadelphia Phillies for John Mabry on May 22. Giambi finished the 2002 season with 20 home runs between the Athletics and Phillies. After the 2002 season, the Phillies traded Giambi to the Boston Red Sox for Josh Hancock. He last played in the majors in 2003 for the Red Sox.

After being released by the Red Sox, Giambi signed minor league deals with the Los Angeles Dodgers in 2004 and the Chicago White Sox in 2005. In his MLB career, Giambi batted .263 with 52 home runs and 209 RBIs.

== Steroids ==
On March 13, 2005, The Kansas City Star reported that Giambi had admitted to having used anabolic steroids. His brother Jason has also admitted to using steroids according to grand jury testimony that was leaked to the press. On December 13, 2007, Giambi was named in the Mitchell Report on steroid usage in baseball as being among the athletes to whom BALCO founder Victor Conte claimed to have sold anabolic steroids; the report said BALCO VP Jim Valente had indicated that urine samples submitted to BALCO by both Jeremy and Jason had tested positive for the steroid drugs.

== Personal life and death ==
Giambi was mentioned in Michael Lewis's book Moneyball, and he became a character in the film that starred Brad Pitt, with Giambi portrayed by Nick Porrazzo.

Giambi was found dead at his parents' home in Claremont, California, on the morning of February 9, 2022, according to a spokesperson for the Claremont Police Department. He was 47. The following day, the Los Angeles County Medical Examiner announced that Giambi's death had been ruled a suicide via a gunshot wound to his chest. In June 2022, reports said that in August 2021, Giambi had been "struck in the head by a baseball and fractured his zygomatic bone" when serving as a pitching coach. His mother also said he felt different after the injury.

== See also ==
- List of doping cases in sport
- List of Major League Baseball players named in the Mitchell Report
