= Mike Fyhrie =

American baseball player (born 1969)

- Relief pitcher
- Born: December 9, 1969 (age 55); Long Beach, California, U.S.
- Batted: Right Threw: Right

Professional debut
- MLB: September 14, 1996, for the New York Mets
- NPB: May 7, 1997, for the Chiba Lotte Marines
- KBO: April 5, 2004, for the Hyundai Unicorns

Last appearance
- NPB: June 26, 1997, for the Chiba Lotte Marines
- MLB: September 28, 2002, for the Oakland Athletics
- KBO: October 30, 2004, for the Hyundai Unicorns

MLB statistics
- Win–loss record: 2–11
- Earned run average: 4.00
- Strikeouts: 109

NPB statistics
- Win–loss record: 3–4
- Earned run average: 5.82
- Strikeouts: 15

KBO statistics
- Win–loss record: 16–6
- Earned run average: 3.32
- Strikeouts: 130
- Stats at Baseball Reference

Teams
- New York Mets (1996); Chiba Lotte Marines (1997); Anaheim Angels (1999–2000); Chicago Cubs (2001); Oakland Athletics (2001–2002); Hyundai Unicorns (2004)

Michael Edwin Fyhrie (born December 9, 1969) is an American former professional baseball player who played five seasons for the New York Mets, Anaheim Angels, Chicago Cubs, and Oakland Athletics of Major League Baseball (MLB). He also pitched one season in Nippon Professional Baseball (NPB) for the Chiba Lotte Marines in 2003. The following year, he played for the Hyundai Unicorns in Korea where he sported a 16–6 record with a sub-3.00 earned run average.
