= Mike Colangelo =

American baseball player (born 1976)

- Outfielder
- Born: October 22, 1976 (age 49); Teaneck, New Jersey, U.S.
- Batted: Right Threw: Right

MLB debut
- June 13, 1999, for the Anaheim Angels

Last MLB appearance
- May 2, 2002, for the Oakland Athletics

MLB statistics
- Batting average: .233
- Home runs: 2
- Runs batted in: 8
- Stats at Baseball Reference

Teams
- Anaheim Angels (1999); San Diego Padres (2001); Oakland Athletics (2002)

Mike Colangelo (born October 22, 1976) is an American former outfielder who played in parts of three seasons for the Anaheim Angels, San Diego Padres, and Oakland Athletics of Major League Baseball (MLB).

== Amateur career ==
A native of Teaneck, New Jersey, Colangelo attended C. D. Hylton High School and George Mason University. In 1996, he played collegiate summer baseball with the Chatham A's of the Cape Cod Baseball League and was named a league all-star. He was selected by the Angels in the 21st round of the 1997 MLB draft.

== Professional career ==
Colangelo made his MLB debut in 1999 with the Angels. He was claimed off waivers by San Diego in 2000, and had his most productive major league season there in 2001, playing in 50 games for the Padres and batting .242. Prior to the 2002 season, he signed as a free agent with Oakland, and appeared in 20 games for the Athletics in what was his final major league campaign.
