= Free agent (business) =

Person who works independently instead of being employed

In business, free agents are people who work independently for themselves, rather than for a single employer. The term "free agent" is believed to have been coined by American writer Daniel H. Pink, author of a 1997 cover story in Fast Company titled “Free Agent Nation.” In 2001 Pink published a book with the same name.

== Overview ==
The combination of several workplace trends – including shortened job cycles, the increase of project work, the acceptance of a new lifestyle and the emergence of the Internet and other technologies – points to free agent workers becoming more of an employment norm in the coming years.

In a 2011 survey sponsored by Kelly Services, free agency is on the rise across all generations, with mature workers making up two-thirds of the free agent population. The survey also revealed that 73% of free agents voluntarily choose this workstyle because they seek the freedom, flexibility and entrepreneurial benefits associated with an independent workstyle.

== Impact ==
According to Pink and his peers, the free agent trend has measurably benefited numerous U.S. companies. Kinko’s, now FedEx Kinko's, restructured itself in 1992 in response to the free agent trend, resulting in a $214 million investment less than four years later by Clayton, Dubilier & Rice.

== See also ==
- Free agent, article on free agency in professional sports
- Free trappers
- Freelance marketplace
- Contingent workforce
