= Jose Flores (infielder) =

American baseball player (born 1973)

- Infielder
- Born: June 28, 1973 (age 53); New York, New York, U.S.
- Batted: Right Threw: Right

MLB debut
- September 7, 2002, for the Oakland Athletics

Last MLB appearance
- October 3, 2004, for the Los Angeles Dodgers

MLB statistics
- Batting average: .143
- Home runs: 0
- Runs batted in: 0
- Stats at Baseball Reference

Teams
- Oakland Athletics (2002); Los Angeles Dodgers (2004)

Jose Carlos Flores (born June 28, 1973) is an American baseball player who appeared in seven games for the Oakland Athletics in 2002 and nine games for the Los Angeles Dodgers in 2004.
