= Art Howe =

American baseball player and manager (born 1946)

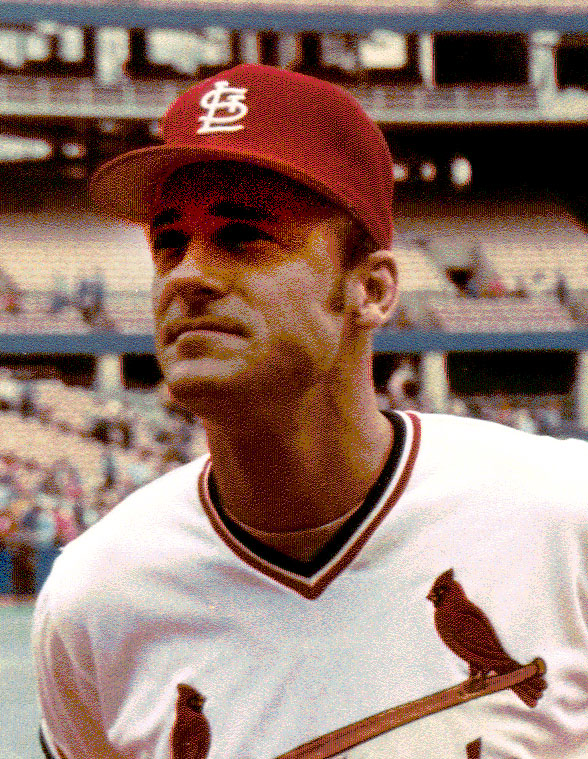
- Howe with the Cardinals in 1985
- Infielder / Manager
- Born: December 15, 1946 (age 79); Pittsburgh, Pennsylvania, U.S.
- Batted: Right Threw: Right

MLB debut
- July 10, 1974, for the Pittsburgh Pirates

Last MLB appearance
- April 19, 1985, for the St. Louis Cardinals

MLB statistics
- Batting average: .260
- Home runs: 43
- Runs batted in: 293
- Managerial record: 1,129–1,137
- Winning %: .498
- Stats at Baseball Reference
- Managerial record at Baseball Reference

Teams
- As player: Pittsburgh Pirates (1974–1975); Houston Astros (1976–1982); St. Louis Cardinals (1984–1985); As manager: Houston Astros (1989–1993); Oakland Athletics (1996–2002); New York Mets (2003–2004); As coach: Texas Rangers (1985–1988); Colorado Rockies (1995); Texas Rangers (2007–2008)

Arthur Henry Howe Jr. (born December 15, 1946) is an American former professional baseball infielder, coach, scout, and manager, who played in Major League Baseball (MLB) for the Pittsburgh Pirates (1974–1975), Houston Astros (1976–1982), and St. Louis Cardinals (1984–1985). Howe managed the Astros (1989–1993), Oakland Athletics (1996–2002), and New York Mets (2003–2004), compiling a career managerial record of 1,129 wins and 1,137 losses.

== Playing career ==
Howe in 1977 photo for Houston Astros

Howe was born in Pittsburgh, Pennsylvania and attended Shaler Area High School. After graduating he attended the University of Wyoming on a college football scholarship, but played baseball after injuries ended his football career. He signed his first playing contract, aged 24, with the Pittsburgh Pirates in 1971. He came to the major leagues as a part-time player with Pittsburgh in 1974–75, before a trade to the Astros for infielder Tommy Helms on January 6, 1976. He played all four infield positions, mostly as a third baseman and second baseman, for Houston from 1976 to 1982. While playing in only 125 games in 1977, and alternating among 2B, SS, and 3B, Howe committed just eight errors. On May 7, 1980, he suffered a fractured jaw when hit by a pitch from Expos pitcher Scott Sanderson. In the 1980 National League West tie-breaker game, he hit a home run in the third inning to increase the lead of the Astros to 4–0 against the Dodgers. He later hit a two-run single in the fourth to make it 7–0. Five innings later, the Astros won 7–1 to clinch their first division title in franchise history.

In May 1981 he won the Player of the Month Award, the only Astros third baseman to win it until Alex Bregman in June 2018. After missing the entire 1983 season with an injury, he finished his playing career with the St. Louis Cardinals (1984–85). The right-handed hitter appeared in 891 games over all or parts of 11 seasons, compiling a lifetime batting average of .260 with 43 home runs.

== As a coach and manager ==
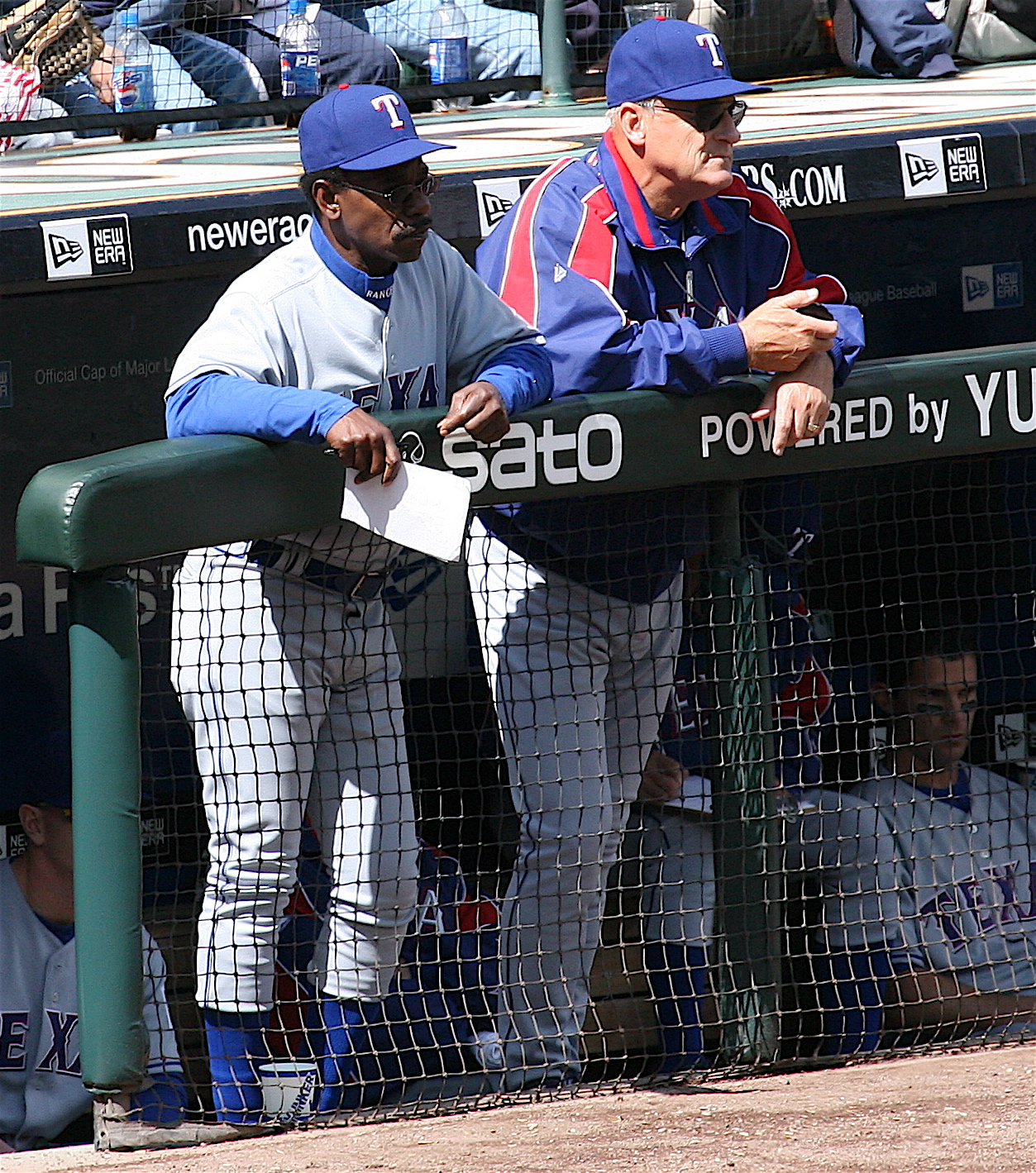
Howe and Ron Washington with the Texas Rangers in 2007.

In 1986, Howe began his coaching career as an aide to Bobby Valentine with the Texas Rangers. After three seasons, he was hired by his old team, the Astros, as manager for 1989, succeeding Hal Lanier. Howe enjoyed a successful first season in Houston, but the team was rebuilding with young players such as Jeff Bagwell and Craig Biggio, and suffered losing years in 1990–91. In 1992 and 1993, the Astros improved to .500 and then to a winning record, but Howe was fired in favor of Terry Collins at the close of the '93 campaign. During the 1994–95 Dominican Winter League season, Howe led the Azucareros del Este to their first championship.

After a year as a major league scout for the Los Angeles Dodgers and spending 1995 as bench coach for the Colorado Rockies, Howe was chosen to replace future Hall of Famer Tony La Russa as manager of the Athletics for 1996. The A's suffered through three losing seasons under Howe before, in 1999, they returned to contention. In 2000, 2001 and 2002, the A's won 91, 102 and 103 games respectively and made the American League playoffs in each season. But they did not win a playoff series, losing each time in the Division Series in five games. This included losing Game 5 at home in 2000 and 2002 and blowing a two-game lead in the 2001 series. Gradually, Howe and general manager Billy Beane grew estranged. At the end of 2002, despite a seven-year record of 600–533 (.530), Howe was released from the final year of his Oakland contract to become the manager of the New York Mets, signing a four-year contract worth $9.4 million.

Philip Seymour Hoffman portrayed Howe in the 2011 film Moneyball, which dramatized Beane's tactics of using sabermetrics to select players. Howe said he was unhappy with his portrayal in both the film and the 2003 Michael Lewis book it was based on, as a stubborn traditionalist who refused to follow Beane's plans and a figurehead who submitted while Beane ran the A's from the clubhouse. Howe described himself as a team player despite his lingering doubts about Beane's methods. Howe was described in the press as a "good company man."

Howe's two years in New York were unsuccessful. The Mets won only 42 percent of their games, the front office went through three general managers, and attendance at Shea Stadium fell. Howe won his 1,000th game as manager on April 20, 2003, in a 7–4 victory against the Florida Marlins. In September 2004, word of Howe's impending firing was leaked to the media two weeks before the season ended, but he was allowed to finish the season. Ultimately, general manager Omar Minaya replaced Howe with Willie Randolph, bench coach for the New York Yankees.

On October 16, 2006, the Philadelphia Phillies hired Howe as the third base coach and an infield instructor. After the Texas Rangers hired Ron Washington, a former coach under Howe in Oakland, as their manager, the Phillies gave Howe permission to speak with the Rangers about any openings in the organization. On November 7, 2006, Howe was hired by the Rangers as Washington's bench coach. He served two years in that role (2007–08) but his contract was not renewed at the end of the Rangers' disappointing 2008 season.

== Managerial record ==
Team	Year	Regular season					Postseason			
Team	Year	Games	Won	Lost	Win %	Finish	Won	Lost	Win %	Result
HOU	1989	162	86	76	.531	3rd in NL West	–	–	–	
HOU	1990	162	75	87	.463	4th in NL West	–	–	–	
HOU	1991	162	65	97	.401	6th in NL West	–	–	–	
HOU	1992	162	81	81	.500	4th in NL West	–	–	–	
HOU	1993	162	85	77	.525	3rd in NL West	–	–	–	
HOU total		810	392	418	.484		0	0	–	
OAK	1996	162	78	84	.481	3rd in AL West	–	–	–	
OAK	1997	162	65	97	.401	4th in AL West	–	–	–	
OAK	1998	162	74	88	.457	4th in AL West	–	–	–	
OAK	1999	162	87	75	.537	2nd in AL West	–	–	–	
OAK	2000	161	91	70	.565	1st in AL West	2	3	.400	Lost ALDS (NYY)
OAK	2001	162	102	60	.630	2nd in AL West	2	3	.400	Lost ALDS (NYY)
OAK	2002	162	103	59	.636	1st in AL West	2	3	.400	Lost ALDS (MIN)
OAK total		1,133	600	533	.530		6	9	.400	
NYM	2003	161	66	95	.410	5th in NL East	–	–	–	
NYM	2004	162	71	91	.438	4th in NL East	–	–	–	
NYM total		323	137	186	.424		0	0	–	
Total		2,266	1,129	1,137	.498		6	9	.400	

== Personal life ==
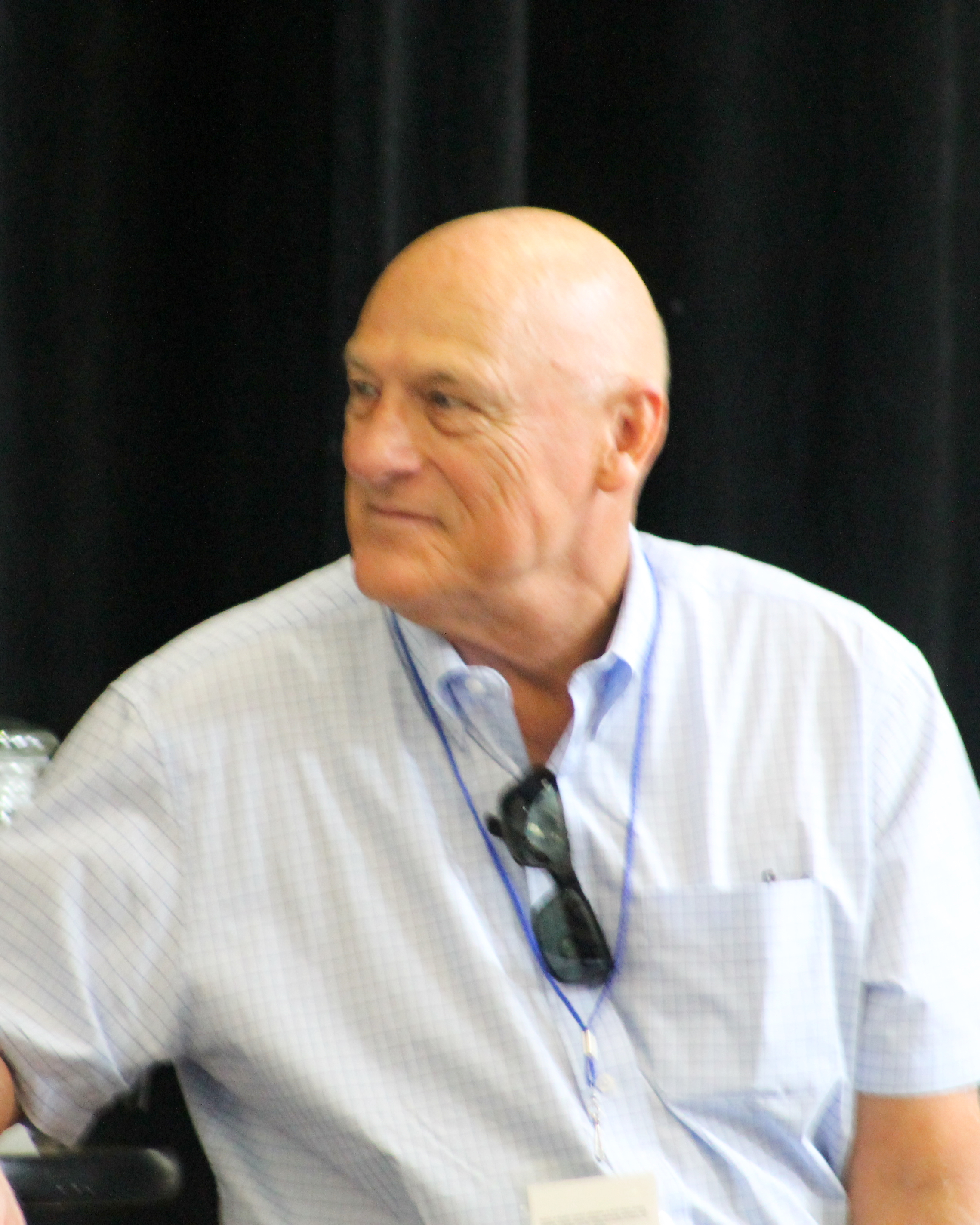
Howe in Houston in 2014

Howe is married to his high school sweetheart. They have three children and six grandchildren. Their son Matt played baseball, reaching Double-A in 2002.

On May 14, 2020, Howe confirmed that he was in an ICU suffering from COVID-19. On May 17, he was released from the hospital, and sent home, reportedly "weak, but on the mend".

== See also ==
- Houston Astros award winners and league leaders
- List of Major League Baseball managers with most career wins

Awards and achievements
Preceded by Dave Concepción	National League Player of the Month; May 1981	Succeeded by Mike Schmidt
Preceded by César Cedeño	Houston Astros longest hitting streak 1981—2000 (with Luis Gonzalez, 1997—2000)	Succeeded by Tony Eusebio
Sporting positions
Preceded by Merv Rettenmund	Texas Rangers batting coach 1985—1988	Succeeded by Tom Robson
Preceded by Merv Rettenmund	Texas Rangers batting coach 1995	Succeeded by Tom Robson
Preceded by Don Wakamatsu	Texas Rangers bench coach 2007—2008	Succeeded by Jackie Moore
