= Erik Hiljus =

American baseball player (born 1972)

- Pitcher
- Born: December 25, 1972 (age 52); Panorama City, California, U.S.
- Batted: Right Threw: Right

MLB debut
- September 10, 1999, for the Detroit Tigers

Last MLB appearance
- May 29, 2002, for the Oakland Athletics

MLB statistics
- Win–loss record: 8–3
- Earned run average: 4.79
- Strikeouts: 99
- Stats at Baseball Reference

Teams
- Detroit Tigers (1999–2000); Oakland Athletics (2001–2002)

Erik Hiljus (born December 25, 1972) is an American former right-handed Major League Baseball pitcher. Hiljus was drafted by the New York Mets in the 4th round of the 1991 amateur draft but did not debut in the major leagues until September 10, 1999, with the Detroit Tigers. Hiljus played for the Tigers in 1999 and 2000 and the Oakland Athletics in 2001 and 2002. In four seasons he earned a record of 8-3 with a 4.72 career ERA in 124 innings pitched.

== See also ==
- List of Major League Baseball single-inning strikeout leaders
