= Orv Franchuk =

Orv Franchuk (born May 17, 1944) is a former college baseball player who has worked as a scout, manager and coach in the minor leagues since 1977.

Franchuk played college baseball at Pepperdine University. He was going to sign with the New York Mets but tore his Achilles tendon his senior year, ending his playing career. He subsequently got his master's degree in education from Cal State Long Beach.

He scouted for the Cincinnati Reds from 1977 to 1984. He was a scout and hitting coach in the California Angels system from 1988 to 1994. In the Oakland Athletics system, he was the hitting coach for the Edmonton Trappers from 1995 to 1997, roving hitting and catching coordinator from 1998 to 2001, and manager for the Vancouver Canadians in 2002. Franchuk was then Minor League hitting coordinator for the Boston Red Sox from 2003 to 2006 and for the Houston Astros from 2007 to 2008. He was hitting coach for the San Antonio Missions for 2009 and the Portland Beavers in 2010.

In 2011, he managed the Edmonton Capitals to the North American League championship.

He was the hitting coach for the Chattanooga Lookouts in 2013.

In addition, Franchuk was a coach for the Canadian National Team at the 1978 Amateur World Series, 1981 Intercontinental Cup and 2007 Baseball World Cup.

After not receiving a contract with the Dodgers to coach in the system for the 2014 season, he accepted a position as an assistant coach for the Northwest Nazarene University baseball team.
