= List of Major League Baseball longest winning streaks =

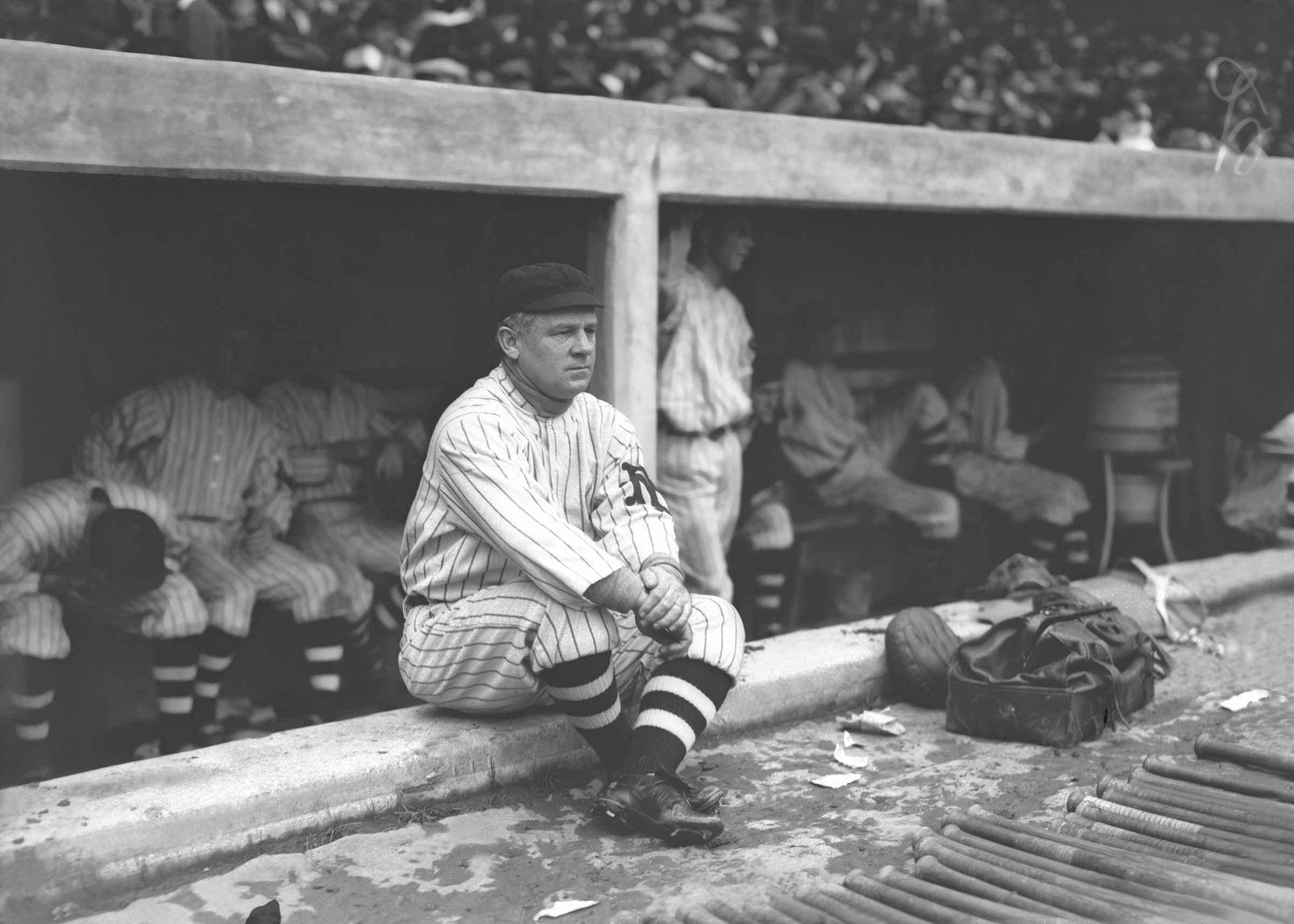
John McGraw, manager of the 1916 New York Giants, who won a record 26 consecutive games

This is a list of the longest team winning streaks in Major League Baseball history. The lists below include streaks that consist entirely of regular season games, streaks from the predecessor National Association (1871–1875), streaks of playoff games, and streaks of World Series games. Some streaks started at the end of one season (regular season games only) and were carried over into the following season.

The National League’s 1916 New York Giants hold the record of winning 26 consecutive games. The longest American League winning streak is 22, by the 2017 Cleveland Indians.

The longest winning streak consisting only of playoff games stands at 12 consecutive wins, by the 1927, 1928 and 1932 New York Yankees (who swept the World Series all three seasons) and tied by the 1998–99 Yankees.

According to Major League Baseball's policy on winning streaks, tie games do not end a team's winning streak. The list below includes streaks with ties.

== Key ==
| ^ | Denotes streaks that contain tie game(s) not included in the win totals |
| ** | Denotes streaks that spanned over two seasons |
| | Denotes streaks that are in progress |
| * | Denotes season in which team won the World Series |

== Game streaks ==
=== Regular season ===
This list contains the top 25 streaks (including ties) consisting entirely of regular season games.

| Rank | Games | Team | Season(s) | Season record(s) | Date | Score | Opponent | Date | Score | Opponent |
| Rank | Games | Team | Season(s) | Season record(s) | Beginning (first victory) | | | End (first defeat) | | |
|---|---|---|---|---|---|---|---|---|---|---|
| 1 | 26^ | New York Giants | 1916 | 86–66 | September 7, 1916 | 4–1 | Brooklyn Robins | September 30, 1916 | 3–8 | Boston Braves |
| 2 | 22 | Cleveland Indians | 2017 | 102–60 | August 24, 2017 | 13–6 | Boston Red Sox | September 15, 2017 | 3–4 | Kansas City Royals |
| 3 (tie) | 21^ | Chicago White Stockings | 1880 | 67–17 | June 2, 1880 | 5–4 | Boston Braves | July 10, 1880 | 0–2 | Cleveland Blues |
| 3 (tie) | 21 | Chicago Cubs | 1935 | 100–54 | September 4, 1935 | 8–2 | Philadelphia Phillies | September 28, 1935 | 5–7 (11) | St. Louis Cardinals |
| 5 (tie) | 20 | St. Louis Maroons | 1884 | 94–19 | April 20, 1884 | 7–2 | Chicago/Pittsburgh | May 24, 1884 | 1–8 | Boston Reds |
| 5 (tie) | 20 | Providence Grays | 1884 | 84–28 | August 7, 1884 | 4–2 | New York Giants | September 9, 1884 | 0–2 | Buffalo Bisons |
| 5 (tie) | 20 | Oakland Athletics | 2002 | 103–59 | August 13, 2002 | 5–4 | Toronto Blue Jays | September 6, 2002 | 0–6 | Minnesota Twins |
| 8 (tie) | 19^ | Chicago White Sox | 1906* | 93–58 | August 2, 1906 | 3–0 | Boston Americans | August 25, 1906 | 4–5 | Washington Senators |
| 8 (tie) | 19 | New York Yankees | 1947* | 97–57 | June 29, 1947 | 3–1 | Washington Senators | July 18, 1947 | 0–8 | Detroit Tigers |
| 10 (tie) | 18 | Chicago White Stockings | 1885 | 87–25 | June 1, 1885 | 6–0 | Detroit Wolverines | June 25, 1885 | 0–2 | Philadelphia Phillies |
| 10 (tie) | 18^ | Boston Beaneaters | 1891 | 87–51 | September 16, 1891 | 7–2 | Chicago Colts | October 3, 1891 | 3–5 | Philadelphia Phillies |
| 10 (tie) | 18 | Baltimore Orioles | 1894 | 89–39 | August 24, 1894 | 5–2 | St. Louis Browns | September 16, 1894 | 3–4 | Cincinnati Reds |
| 10 (tie) | 18 | New York Giants | 1904 | 106–47 | June 16, 1904 | 4–3 | St. Louis Cardinals | July 4, 1904 | 5–6 | Philadelphia Phillies |
| 10 (tie) | 18 | New York Yankees | 1953* | 99–52 | May 27, 1953 | 3–1 | Washington Senators | June 16, 1953 | 1–3 | St. Louis Browns |
| 15 (tie) | 17 | St. Louis Browns | 1885^{1} | 79–33 | May 5, 1885 | 12–4 | Louisville Colonels | June 2, 1885 | 1–7 | Baltimore Orioles |
| 15 (tie) | 17 | Boston Beaneaters | 1897 | 93–39 | May 31, 1897 | 25–5 | St. Louis Cardinals | June 22, 1897 | 4–7 | Brooklyn Bridegrooms |
| 15 (tie) | 17 | New York Giants | 1907 | 82–71 | April 25, 1907 | 6–3 | Philadelphia Phillies | May 20, 1907 | 4–6 | St. Louis Cardinals |
| 15 (tie) | 17 | Washington Senators | 1912 | 91–61 | May 30, 1912 | 5–0 | Boston Red Sox | June 19, 1912 | 1–2 | Philadelphia Athletics |
| 15 (tie) | 17 | New York Giants | 1916 | 86–66 | May 9, 1916 | 13–5 | Pittsburgh Pirates | May 30, 1916 | 1–5 | Philadelphia Phillies |
| 15 (tie) | 17 | Philadelphia Athletics | 1931 | 107–45 | May 5, 1931 | 4–1 | Boston Red Sox | May 26, 1931 | 2–6 | New York Yankees |
| 15 (tie) | 17 | Pittsburgh Pirates** | 1937; 1938 | 86–68; 86–64 | September 24, 1937 | 8–2 | Cincinnati Reds | April 26, 1938 | 3–5 (10) | Chicago Cubs |
| 15 (tie) | 17 | St. Louis Cardinals | 2021 | 90–72 | September 11, 2021 | 6–4 | Cincinnati Reds | September 29, 2021 | 0–4 | Milwaukee Brewers |
| 23 (tie) | 16 | St. Louis Maroons | 1884 | 94–19 | August 26, 1884 | 5–4 | Chicago/Pittsburgh | September 18, 1884 | 2–4 | Washington Nationals |
| 23 (tie) | 16^ | Philadelphia Quakers | 1887 | 75–48 | September 15, 1887 | 8–4 | Indianapolis Hoosiers | April 20, 1888 | 3–4 | Boston Beaneaters |
| 23 (tie) | 16 | Philadelphia Phillies | 1890 | 78–53 | July 8, 1890 | 9–4 | Cincinnati Reds | July 28, 1890 | 4–12 | Chicago Colts |
| 23 (tie) | 16 | Philadelphia Phillies | 1892 | 87–66 | June 10, 1892 | 7–1 | Cleveland Spiders | June 29, 1892 | 1–9 | Boston Beaneaters |
| 23 (tie) | 16 | Pittsburgh Pirates | 1909* | 110–42 | September 9, 1909 | 3–1 | Cincinnati Reds | September 27, 1909 | 7–8 | New York Giants |
| 23 (tie) | 16 | New York Giants | 1912 | 103–48 | June 19, 1912 | 6–5 | Boston Braves | July 4, 1912 | 4–10 | Brooklyn Dodgers |
| 23 (tie) | 16 | New York Yankees | 1926 | 91–63 | May 10, 1926 | 13–9 | Detroit Tigers | May 28, 1926 | 1–2 | Philadelphia Athletics |
| 23 (tie) | 16 | New York Giants | 1951 | 98–59 | August 12, 1951 | 3–2 | Philadelphia Phillies | August 28, 1951 | 0–2 | Pittsburgh Pirates |
| 23 (tie) | 16 | Kansas City Royals | 1977 | 102–60 | August 31, 1977 | 5–4 | Texas Rangers | September 16, 1977 | 1–4 | Seattle Mariners |
| 23 (tie) | 16 | Milwaukee Brewers** | 1986; 1987 | 77–84; 91–71 | October 3, 1986 | 4–1 | Toronto Blue Jays | April 21, 1987 | 1–7 | Chicago White Sox |

==== National Association ====
| Rank | Games | Team | Season(s) | Season record(s) | Date | Score | Opponent | Date | Score | Opponent |
| Rank | Games | Team | Season(s) | Season record(s) | Beginning (first victory) | | | End (first defeat) | | |
|---|---|---|---|---|---|---|---|---|---|---|
| 1 | 26^ | Boston Red Stockings | 1875 | 71–8 | April 19, 1875 | 6–0 | New Haven Elm Citys | June 5, 1875 | 4–5 | St. Louis Brown Stockings |
| 2 | 18 | Boston Red Stockings | 1872 | 39–8 | May 7, 1872 | 23–3 | Brooklyn Atlantics | July 20, 1872 | 10–17 | Troy Trojans |
| 3 (tie) | 15 | Hartford Dark Blues** | 1874; 1875 | 16–37; 54–28 | October 27, 1874 | 10–3 | Philadelphia Whites | May 18, 1875 | 5–10 | Boston Red Stockings |
| 3 (tie) | 15 | Boston Red Stockings | 1875 | 71–8 | September 6, 1875 | 9–4 | Philadelphia Whites | October 29, 1875 | 8–9 | Hartford Dark Blues |

^{1}Denotes season in which team won a pennant in the American Association

=== Postseason ===
This list contains the top 10 streaks (including ties) consisting entirely of postseason games.

Rank
| Rank | Games | Team | Season(s) | Beginning (first victory) | | | End (first defeat) | | |
|---|---|---|---|---|---|---|---|---|---|
| 1 (tie) | 12 | New York Yankees | 1927–28, 1932 | October 5, 1927 | 5–4 | Pittsburgh Pirates | September 30, 1936 | 1–6 | New York Giants |
| 1 (tie) | 12 | New York Yankees | 1998–99 | October 10, 1998 | 4–0 | Cleveland Indians | October 16, 1999 | 1–13 | Boston Red Sox |
| 3 | 11 | Kansas City Royals | 1985, 2014 | October 24, 1985 | 6–1 | St. Louis Cardinals | October 21, 2014 | 1–7 | San Francisco Giants |
| 4 (tie) | 10 | New York Yankees | 1937–39, 1941 | October 10, 1937 | 4–2 | New York Giants | October 2, 1941 | 2–3 | Brooklyn Dodgers |
| 4 (tie) | 10 | Oakland Athletics | 1989–90 | October 7, 1989 | 6–5 | Toronto Blue Jays | October 16, 1990 | 0–7 | Cincinnati Reds |
| 4 (tie) | 10 | San Francisco Giants | 2012, 2014 | October 19, 2012 | 5–0 | St. Louis Cardinals | October 6, 2014 | 1–4 | Washington Nationals |
| 7 | 9 | Boston Red Sox | 2007–08 | October 18, 2007 | 7–1 | Cleveland Indians | October 5, 2008 | 4–5 (12) | Los Angeles Angels |
| 8 (tie) | 8 | Cincinnati Reds | 1975–76 | October 22, 1975 | 4–3 | Boston Red Sox | October 12, 1979 | 2–5 (11) | Pittsburgh Pirates |
| 8 (tie) | 8 | Cincinnati Reds | 1990, 1995 | October 12, 1990 | 2–1 | Pittsburgh Pirates | October 10, 1995 | 1–2 (11) | Atlanta Braves |
| 8 (tie) | 8 | Boston Red Sox | 2004 | October 17, 2004 | 6–4 (12) | New York Yankees | October 4, 2005 | 2–14 | Chicago White Sox |
| 8 (tie) | 8 | Chicago White Sox | 2005 | October 12, 2005 | 2–1 | Los Angeles Angels | October 2, 2008 | 4–6 | Tampa Bay Rays |
| 8 (tie) | 8 | Washington Nationals | 2019 | October 7, 2019 | 6–1 | Los Angeles Dodgers | October 25, 2019 | 1–4 | Houston Astros |

=== World Series ===
This list contains the top 10 streaks consisting entirely of World Series games.

| Rank | Games | Team | Series | Date | Score | Opponent | Date | Score | Opponent |
| Rank | Games | Team | Series | Beginning (first victory) | | | End (first defeat) | | |
|---|---|---|---|---|---|---|---|---|---|
| 1 | 14 | New York Yankees | 1996, 1998–2000 | October 22, 1996 | 5–2 | Atlanta Braves | October 24, 2000 | 2–4 | New York Mets |
| 2 | 12 | New York Yankees | 1927–28, 1932 | October 5, 1927 | 13–6 | Pittsburgh Pirates | September 30, 1936 | 1–6 | New York Giants |
| 3 | 10 | New York Yankees | 1937–39, 1941 | October 10, 1937 | 3–2 | New York Giants | October 2, 1941 | 2–3 | Brooklyn Dodgers |
| 4(tie) | 9 | Cincinnati Reds | 1975–76, 1990 | October 22, 1975 | 4–3 | Boston Red Sox | | | |
| 4(tie) | 9 | Boston Red Sox | 2004, 2007, 2013 | October 23, 2004 | 8–1 | St. Louis Cardinals | October 24, 2013 | 2–4 | St. Louis Cardinals |
| 6(tie) | 7 | New York Yankees | 1949–50 | October 7, 1949 | 5–2 | Brooklyn Dodgers | October 4, 1951 | 1–5 | New York Giants |
| 6(tie) | 7 | San Francisco Giants | 2010, 2012, 2014 | October 31, 2010 | 4–0 | Texas Rangers | October 22, 2014 | 2–7 | Kansas City Royals |
| 8(tie) | 6 | Chicago Cubs | 1907–08 | October 9, 1907 | 6–1 | Detroit Tigers | October 12, 1908 | 3–8 | Detroit Tigers |
| 8(tie) | 6 | Los Angeles Dodgers | 1981, 1988 | October 23, 1981 | 5–4 | New York Yankees | October 18, 1988 | 1–2 | Oakland Athletics |
| 8(tie) | 6 | New York Yankees | 1978, 1981 | October 13, 1978 | 3–0 | Los Angeles Dodgers | October 23, 1981 | 4–5 | Los Angeles Dodgers |

== Series streaks ==
=== Regular season – single opponent ===
The longest winning streak against a single opponent is 23 games by the Baltimore Orioles over the Kansas City Royals from May 10, 1969, to August 2, 1970.

Baltimore had won more than 90 games in three of the previous four seasons, with a World Series title in 1966. The Royals were an expansion team in their first season. Kansas City won the first meeting on May 9, 1969, but Baltimore took the final 11 that season and swept all 12 in 1970 before the Royals finally took a walk-off win in their first confrontation of 1971.

=== Postseason ===
This list contains only the top 10 streaks consisting entirely of postseason series. For the purpose of this list, one-game wild card matchups, such as the 2012 Cardinals' win, are counted.

Rank
| Rank | Series | Team | | Beginning (first victory) | | | End (first defeat) | | |
|---|---|---|---|---|---|---|---|---|---|
| 1 (tie) | 11 | New York Yankees | 1998–2001 | 1998 ALDS | 3–0 | Texas Rangers | 2001 WS | 3–4 | Arizona Diamondbacks |
| 1 (tie) | 11 | San Francisco Giants | 2010, 2012, 2014, 2016 | 2010 NLDS | 3–1 | Atlanta Braves | 2016 NLDS | 1–3 | Chicago Cubs |
| 3 | 8 | New York Yankees | 1927–28, 1932, 1936–39, 1941 | 1927 WS | 4–0 | Pittsburgh Pirates | 1942 WS | 1–4 | St. Louis Cardinals |
| 4 (tie) | 7 | New York Yankees | 1943, 1947, 1949–53 | 1943 WS | 4–1 | St. Louis Cardinals | 1955 WS | 3–4 | Brooklyn Dodgers |
| 4 (tie) | 7 | Miami Marlins | 1997, 2003, 2020 | 1997 NLDS | 3–0 | San Francisco Giants | 2020 NLDS | 0–3 | Atlanta Braves |
| 6 | 6 | Oakland Athletics | 1972–74 | 1972 ALCS | 3–2 | Detroit Tigers | 1975 ALCS | 0–3 | Boston Red Sox |
| 7 (tie) | 5 | Boston Red Sox | 1903, 1912, 1915–16, 1918 | 1903 WS | 5–3 | Pittsburgh Pirates | 1946 WS | 3–4 | St. Louis Cardinals |
| 7 (tie) | 5 | Atlanta Braves | 1995–96 | 1995 NLDS | 3–1 | Colorado Rockies | 1996 WS | 2–4 | New York Yankees |
| 7 (tie) | 5 | Minnesota Twins | 1987, 1991, 2002 | 1987 ALCS | 4–1 | Detroit Tigers | 2002 ALCS | 1–4 | Anaheim Angels |
| 7 (tie) | 5 | Philadelphia Phillies | 2008–09 | 2008 NLDS | 3–1 | Milwaukee Brewers | 2009 WS | 2–4 | New York Yankees |
| 7 (tie) | 5 | St. Louis Cardinals | 2011–12 | 2011 NLDS | 3–2 | Philadelphia Phillies | 2012 NLCS | 3–4 | San Francisco Giants |
| 7 (tie) | 5 | Kansas City Royals | 1985, 2014 | 1985 ALCS | 4–3 | Toronto Blue Jays | 2014 WS | 3–4 | San Francisco Giants |

== See also ==
- List of Major League Baseball longest losing streaks
- 1869–1870 Cincinnati Red Stockings, an 84-game winning streak including a 65-game perfect season.
- Moneyball, 2011 film based on the 2003 book.
