= Moneyball: The Art of Winning an Unfair Game =

2003 book by Michael Lewis

Moneyball The Art of Winning an Unfair Game
- Moneyball: The Art of Winning an Unfair Game
- Author: Michael Lewis
- Language: English
- Genre: Non-fiction; sports writing
- Publisher: W. W. Norton & Company
- Publication date: June 17, 2003
- Publication place: United States
- Media type: Print (hardcover and paperback)
- Pages: 288
- ISBN: 0393057658
- OCLC: 51817522
- Dewey Decimal: 796.357/06/91
- LC Class: GV880 .L49 2003

Moneyball: The Art of Winning an Unfair Game is a book by Michael Lewis, published in 2003, about the Oakland Athletics baseball team and its general manager Billy Beane. It describes the team's sabermetric approach to assembling a competitive baseball team on a small budget. It was adapted into the 2011 film Moneyball, starring Brad Pitt and Jonah Hill.

== Synopsis ==
The central premise of Moneyball is that the collective wisdom of baseball insiders (including players, managers, coaches, scouts, and the front office) over the past century is outdated, subjective, and often flawed, and that the statistics traditionally used to gauge players, such as stolen bases, runs batted in, and batting average, are relics of a 19th-century view of the game. Sabermetrics and statistical analysis had demonstrated, for example, that on-base percentage and slugging percentage are better measures of batting. The Oakland A's began seeking players who were "undervalued in the market"—that is, who were receiving lower salaries relative to their ability to contribute to winning, as measured by these advanced statistics.

By re-evaluating their strategy in this way, the 2002 Athletics, with a budget of $44 million for player salaries, were competitive with larger-market teams such as the New York Yankees, whose payroll exceeded $125 million that season. The approach brought the A's to the playoffs in 2002 and 2003.

Lewis explored several themes in the book, such as insiders vs. outsiders (established traditionalists vs. upstart proponents of sabermetrics), the democratization of information causing a flattening of hierarchies, and "the ruthless drive for efficiency that capitalism demands".

Moneyball also looks at how the A's evaluated prospects. Sabermetricians argue that a college baseball player's chance of MLB success is much higher than the more traditional high school draft pick. Beane maintains that high draft picks spent on high school prospects, regardless of talent or physical potential as evaluated by traditional scouting, are riskier than those spent on more experienced college players. College players have played more games and thus there is a larger mass of statistical data on which to base expensive decisions. Lewis cites A's minor leaguer Jeremy Bonderman, drafted out of high school in 2001 over Beane's objections, as an example of the type of draft pick Beane would avoid. Bonderman had all of the traditional "tools" that scouts look for, but thousands of such players have been signed by MLB organizations out of high school over the years and failed to develop as anticipated. Lewis explores the A's approach to the 2002 MLB draft, when the team had a run of early picks. The book documents Beane's often tense discussions with his scouting staff (who favored traditional subjective evaluation of potential rather than objective sabermetrics) in preparation for the draft to the actual draft, which defied all expectations and was considered at the time a wildly successful (if unorthodox) effort by Beane.

Moneyball traces the history of the sabermetric movement back to such people as Bill James (then a member of the Boston Red Sox front office) and Craig R. Wright. Lewis explores how James's seminal Baseball Abstract, published annually from the late 1970s through the late 1980s, influenced many of the young, up-and-coming baseball experts that joined the ranks of baseball management in the 1990s.

== Influence ==
"Moneyball" has entered baseball's lexicon; teams that value sabermetrics are often said to be playing Moneyball. Baseball traditionalists, in particular some scouts and media members, decry the sabermetric revolution and have disparaged Moneyball for emphasizing sabermetrics over more traditional methods of player evaluation. Nevertheless, Moneyball changed the way many major league front offices do business. In its wake, teams such as the New York Mets, New York Yankees, San Diego Padres, St. Louis Cardinals, Boston Red Sox, Washington Nationals, Arizona Diamondbacks, Cleveland Guardians, and Toronto Blue Jays have hired full-time sabermetric analysts.

When the Mets hired Sandy Alderson—Beane's predecessor and mentor with the A's—as their general manager after the 2010 season, and hired Beane's former associates Paul DePodesta and J. P. Ricciardi to the front office, the team was jokingly referred to as the "Moneyball Mets". Like the Oakland A's in the 1990s, the Mets had been directed by their ownership to slash payroll. Under Alderson's tenure, the team payroll dropped below $100 million per year from 2012 to 2014, and the Mets reached the 2015 World Series—en route defeating MLB's highest-payroll team, the Los Angeles Dodgers.

In the 2019 and 2020 seasons, the Tampa Bay Rays were considered masters of Moneyball, reaching the 2020 World Series with a payroll prorated at $28.2 million, the third-lowest of Major League Baseball's 30 teams.

Lewis has acknowledged that the book's success may have hurt the Athletics' fortunes as other teams accepted sabermetrics, reducing Oakland's edge.

Since the book's publication and success, Lewis has discussed plans for a sequel to Moneyball called Underdogs, revisiting the players and their relative success several years into their careers, although only four players from the 2002 draft played much at the Major League level.

Moneyball has also influenced and been influenced by other professional sports teams including European club association football (soccer). Beane has regarded Arsenal F.C.'s former manager Arsène Wenger as a personal idol. Beane has held discussions with Wenger, former Manchester United F.C. manager Alex Ferguson, and Liverpool F.C. owner John W. Henry. His friendship with ex-Arsenal scout Damien Comolli and Arsenal owner Stan Kroenke allowed him to delve deep into the world of English football. According to El País, Liverpool F.C. co-owner John W. Henry did not trust public opinion, so he looked for a mathematical method similar to the one used for the Boston Red Sox, which he also owns via Fenway Sports Group, in guiding them to three World Series wins. The mathematical model turned out to be that of Cambridge physicist Ian Graham, which was used to select the manager (Jürgen Klopp) and players essential for Liverpool to win the 2018–19 UEFA Champions League.

== Reception ==
Richard Thaler of the University of Chicago Graduate School of Business and Cass Sunstein of the University of Chicago Law School described the book as a "sensation... Lewis has a wonderful story to tell, and he tells it wonderfully... Lewis also raises some serious puzzles that he does not resolve, and his account has some large and perhaps profound implications that he does not much explore."

David Haglund of Slate and Jonah Keri of Grantland criticized the book for glossing over key young talent acquired through the draft and signed internationally. They argued that the book ignores the pitching trio of Tim Hudson, Mark Mulder, and Barry Zito, and position players such as Eric Chavez and Miguel Tejada, all of whom were discovered via traditional scouting methodology and were key contributors to the success of the 2002 Athletics. In 2002, Zito received the AL Cy Young Award and Tejada the AL MVP Award.

Sheldon and Alan Hirsch also argue against Moneyball's thesis in their 2011 book The Beauty of Short Hops: How Chance and Circumstance Confound the Moneyball Approach to Baseball, pointing out that the 2002 A's were notable for allowing fewer runs than other teams, not scoring more.

== Film ==
A movie based on the book was released in 2011. Actor Brad Pitt stars as Billy Beane, while Jonah Hill plays fictional character Peter Brand, based on Paul DePodesta; Philip Seymour Hoffman plays A's manager Art Howe. Academy Award-winning screenwriter Steve Zaillian was hired to write the script, and Steven Soderbergh was slated to direct, replacing David Frankel. But in June 2009, because of conflicts over a revised script by Soderbergh, Sony put the movie on hold just days before it was scheduled to begin shooting. Soderbergh was eventually let go.

Bennett Miller took over directing duties, and Aaron Sorkin rewrote the script. Shooting began in July 2010 at Blair Field, the sports stadium for Wilson High School (Long Beach), Sony Pictures Studios in Culver City, Dodger Stadium, and the Oakland-Alameda Coliseum. Moneyball was released in theaters on September 23, 2011. The film was nominated for six Academy Awards, including Best Actor and Best Picture.

== In popular culture ==
The book is parodied in the 2010 Simpsons episode "MoneyBART", in which Lisa manages Bart's Little League baseball team using sabermetric principles. Bill James made an appearance in this episode. The film adaptation is mentioned in Brooklyn Nine-Nine as being Captain Raymond Holt's favorite film because of the beauty of its statistical analysis. Additionally, Moneyball was the namesake for the Moneyball Act, sponsored by U.S. Representatives Barbara Lee and Mark DeSaulnier, with the intended purpose of requiring MLB teams which move 25 miles from their former home cities, including the Athletics, to compensate the cities.

== See also ==
- Evidence-based practices
- Casey Award
- Ball Four
- Bull Durham
- Nate Silver who developed PECOTA, the Player Empirical Comparison and Optimization Test Algorithm, to predict baseball player performance
