= 2001 Baltimore Orioles season =

Major League Baseball season

2001 Baltimore Orioles
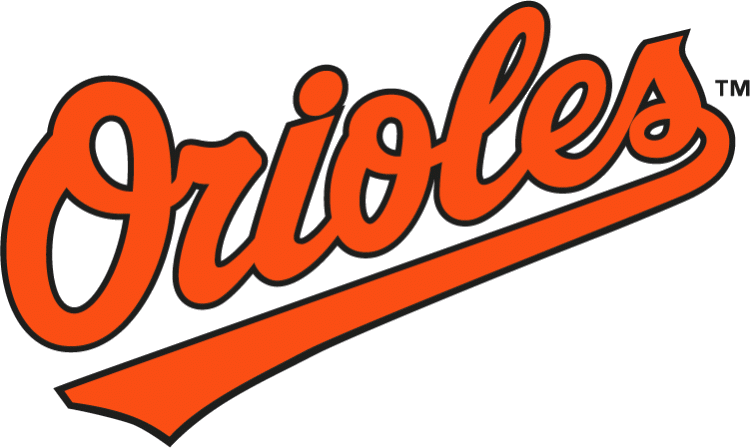
- League: American League
- Division: East
- Ballpark: Oriole Park at Camden Yards
- City: Baltimore, Maryland
- Record: 63–98 (.391)
- Divisional place: 4th
- Owners: Peter Angelos
- General managers: Syd Thrift
- Managers: Mike Hargrove
- Television: WJZ-TV; WNUV; Comcast SportsNet (Jim Palmer, Michael Reghi, Mike Flanagan)
- Radio: WBAL (AM) (Fred Manfra, Jim Hunter, Chuck Thompson)

The 2001 Baltimore Orioles season was the 101st season in Baltimore Orioles franchise history, the 48th in Baltimore, and the 10th at Oriole Park at Camden Yards. They failed to improve on their 74–88 (.457) record from the previous year with a 63–98 record, and missed the postseason for the 4th straight season. It would also be the final season for Hall of Famer Cal Ripken Jr.

== Offseason ==
- October 5, 2000: Trenidad Hubbard was released by the Baltimore Orioles.
- December 20, 2000: Mike Bordick was signed as a free agent with the Baltimore Orioles.

== Regular season ==
Cal
Ripken Jr.
SS, 3B
Retired 2001

In June 2001, Cal Ripken Jr. announced that he would retire at the end of the season. He was voted the starting third baseman in the All-Star game at Safeco Field on July 10, 2001, in Seattle. In a tribute to Ripken's achievements and stature in the game, shortstop Alex Rodriguez (unknowingly foreshadowing his own future) insisted on exchanging positions with third baseman Ripken for the first inning, so that Ripken could play shortstop as he had for most of his career. In the third inning, Ripken made his first plate appearance and was greeted with a standing ovation. Ripken then homered off the first pitch from Chan Ho Park. Ripken ended up with All-Star MVP honors.

The Howard Street Tunnel fire began a few blocks away from Camden Yards during an Orioles doubleheader on July 18. The stadium was evacuated after that day's first game. The second game of the doubleheader and the games scheduled to be played on July 19 and 20 were all postponed, with play at Camden Yards resuming on July 21.

Ripken's #8 was retired by the Baltimore Orioles in a ceremony before the final home game of the 2001 season. Ripken's final game was originally set to be played at Yankee Stadium; however, all Major League Baseball games from September 11 to 17 were postponed due to the terrorist attacks on New York City and the Pentagon. The Orioles were at home during the attacks, so the games missed were added on to the end of the season's schedule, which changed the location of Ripken's final game to Oriole Park, much to the delight of Orioles fans. Cal Ripken ended his career in the on deck circle in the bottom of the ninth inning. Longtime teammate Brady Anderson, also playing in his last game for the Orioles, swung and missed a fastball high and tight on a 3–2 count to end the game. In his final season, Ripken had the lowest zone rating of all major league third basemen (.734).

=== Opening Day starters ===
- Brady Anderson
- Mike Bordick
- Delino DeShields
- Brook Fordyce
- Jerry Hairston Jr.
- Pat Hentgen
- Melvin Mora
- Chris Richard
- Cal Ripken Jr.
- David Segui

=== Season standings ===
AL East
| Team | W | L | Pct. | GB | Home | Road |
|---|---|---|---|---|---|---|
| New York Yankees | 95 | 65 | .594 | — | 51‍–‍28 | 44‍–‍37 |
| Boston Red Sox | 82 | 79 | .509 | 13½ | 41‍–‍40 | 41‍–‍39 |
| Toronto Blue Jays | 80 | 82 | .494 | 16 | 40‍–‍42 | 40‍–‍40 |
| Baltimore Orioles | 63 | 98 | .391 | 32½ | 30‍–‍50 | 33‍–‍48 |
| Tampa Bay Devil Rays | 62 | 100 | .383 | 34 | 37‍–‍44 | 25‍–‍56 |

=== Record vs. opponents ===
2001 American League record Source: MLB Standings Grid – 2001
| Team | ANA | BAL | BOS | CWS | CLE | DET | KC | MIN | NYY | OAK | SEA | TB | TEX | TOR | NL |
|---|---|---|---|---|---|---|---|---|---|---|---|---|---|---|---|
| Anaheim | — | 4–5 | 4–3 | 6–3 | 5–4 | 5–4 | 5–4 | 3–6 | 4–3 | 6–14 | 4–15 | 7–2 | 7–12 | 5–4 | 10–8 |
| Baltimore | 5–4 | — | 9–10 | 3–4 | 1–5 | 4–2 | 5–2 | 3–3 | 5–13–1 | 2–7 | 1–8 | 10–9 | 2–7 | 7–12 | 6–12 |
| Boston | 3–4 | 10–9 | — | 3–3 | 3–6 | 4–5 | 3–3 | 3–3 | 5–13 | 4–5 | 3–6 | 14–5 | 5–2 | 12–7 | 10–8 |
| Chicago | 3–6 | 4–3 | 3–3 | — | 10–9 | 13–6 | 14–5 | 5–14 | 1–5 | 1–8 | 2–7 | 5–2 | 7–2 | 3–3 | 12–6 |
| Cleveland | 4–5 | 5–1 | 6–3 | 9–10 | — | 13–6 | 11–8 | 14–5 | 4–5 | 4–3 | 2–5 | 5–1 | 5–4 | 2–4 | 7–11 |
| Detroit | 4–5 | 2–4 | 5–4 | 6–13 | 6–13 | — | 8–11 | 4–15 | 4–5 | 1–6 | 2–5 | 4–2 | 8–1 | 2–4 | 10–8 |
| Kansas City | 4–5 | 2–5 | 3–3 | 5–14 | 8–11 | 11–8 | — | 6–13 | 0–6 | 3–6 | 3–6 | 4–2 | 4–5 | 4–3 | 8–10 |
| Minnesota | 6–3 | 3–3 | 3–3 | 14–5 | 5–14 | 15–4 | 13–6 | — | 4–2 | 5–4 | 1–8 | 1–6 | 4–5 | 2–5 | 9–9 |
| New York | 3–4 | 13–5–1 | 13–5 | 5–1 | 5–4 | 5–4 | 6–0 | 2–4 | — | 3–6 | 3–6 | 13–6 | 3–4 | 11–8 | 10–8 |
| Oakland | 14–6 | 7–2 | 5–4 | 8–1 | 3–4 | 6–1 | 6–3 | 4–5 | 6–3 | — | 9–10 | 7–2 | 9–10 | 6–3 | 12–6 |
| Seattle | 15–4 | 8–1 | 6–3 | 7–2 | 5–2 | 5–2 | 6–3 | 8–1 | 6–3 | 10–9 | — | 7–2 | 15–5 | 6–3 | 12–6 |
| Tampa Bay | 2–7 | 9–10 | 5–14 | 2–5 | 1–5 | 2–4 | 2–4 | 6–1 | 6–13 | 2–7 | 2–7 | — | 4–5 | 9–10 | 10–8 |
| Texas | 12–7 | 7–2 | 2–5 | 2–7 | 4–5 | 1–8 | 5–4 | 5–4 | 4–3 | 10–9 | 5–15 | 5–4 | — | 3–6 | 8–10 |
| Toronto | 4–5 | 12–7 | 7–12 | 3–3 | 4–2 | 4–2 | 3–4 | 5–2 | 8–11 | 3–6 | 3–6 | 10–9 | 6–3 | — | 8–10 |

=== Transactions ===
- June 25, 2001: Tony Batista was selected off waivers by the Baltimore Orioles from the Toronto Blue Jays.

=== Roster ===
2001 Baltimore Orioles
Roster
| Pitchers: 49 John Bale; 56 Rick Bauer; 45 Lesli Brea; 47,72 Sean Douglass; 36 Kris Foster; 27 Buddy Groom; 41 Pat Hentgen; 16 Jason Johnson; 50 Jorge Julio; 59 Ryan Kohlmeier; 12 Calvin Maduro; 47 Chuck McElroy; 31 José Mercedes; 75 Alan Mills; 39 Chad Paronto; 53 John Parrish; 43 Sidney Ponson; 37 Willis Roberts; 52 B. J. Ryan; 35 Josh Towers; 28 Mike Trombley; 45 John Wasdin | Catchers: 26 Brook Fordyce; 60 Gerónimo Gil; 51 Fernando Lunar; 24 Greg Myers; Infielders: 10 Tony Batista; 61 Casey Blake; 14 Mike Bordick; 15 Jerry Hairston Jr.; 8 Cal Ripken Jr.; 1 Brian Roberts; 23 David Segui | Outfielders: 9 Brady Anderson; 3 Larry Bigbie; 18 Jeff Conine; 11 Delino DeShields; 25 Jay Gibbons; 40 Willie Harris; 40 Gene Kingsale; 17 Mike Kinkade; 32 Luis Matos; 6 Melvin Mora; 11,30 Tim Raines; 63 Tim Raines Jr.; 38 Chris Richard | Manager: 21 Mike Hargrove; Coaches: 48 Terry Crowley; 44 Elrod Hendricks; 33 Eddie Murray; 2 Sam Perlozzo; 49 Tom Trebelhorn; 34 Mark Wiley |

== Player stats ==
=== Batting ===
==== Starters by position ====
Note: Pos = Position; G = Games played; AB = At bats; H = Hits; Avg. = Batting average; HR = Home runs; RBI = Runs batted in

| Pos | Player | G | AB | H | Avg. | HR | RBI |
|---|---|---|---|---|---|---|---|
| C | Brook Fordyce | 95 | 292 | 61 | .209 | 5 | 19 |
| 1B | Jeff Conine | 139 | 524 | 163 | .311 | 14 | 97 |
| 2B | Jerry Hairston Jr. | 159 | 532 | 124 | .233 | 8 | 47 |
| SS | Mike Bordick | 58 | 229 | 57 | .249 | 7 | 30 |
| 3B | Cal Ripken Jr. | 128 | 477 | 114 | .239 | 14 | 68 |
| LF | Delino DeShields | 58 | 188 | 37 | .197 | 3 | 21 |
| CF | Melvin Mora | 128 | 436 | 109 | .250 | 7 | 48 |
| RF | Brady Anderson | 131 | 430 | 87 | .202 | 8 | 45 |
| DH | Tony Batista | 84 | 308 | 82 | .266 | 12 | 42 |

==== Other batters ====
Note: G = Games played; AB = At bats; H = Hits; Avg. = Batting average; HR = Home runs; RBI = Runs batted in

| Player | G | AB | H | Avg. | HR | RBI |
|---|---|---|---|---|---|---|
| Chris Richard | 136 | 483 | 128 | .265 | 15 | 61 |
| David Segui | 82 | 292 | 88 | .301 | 10 | 46 |
| Brian Roberts | 75 | 273 | 69 | .253 | 2 | 17 |
| Jay Gibbons | 73 | 225 | 53 | .236 | 15 | 36 |
| Fernando Lunar | 64 | 167 | 41 | .246 | 0 | 16 |
| Mike Kinkade | 61 | 160 | 44 | .275 | 4 | 16 |
| Larry Bigbie | 47 | 131 | 30 | .229 | 2 | 11 |
| Luis Matos | 31 | 98 | 21 | .214 | 4 | 12 |
| Greg Myers | 25 | 74 | 20 | .270 | 4 | 18 |
| Gerónimo Gil | 17 | 58 | 17 | .293 | 0 | 6 |
| Willie Harris | 9 | 24 | 3 | .125 | 0 | 0 |
| Tim Raines Jr. | 7 | 23 | 4 | .174 | 0 | 0 |
| Casey Blake | 6 | 15 | 2 | .133 | 1 | 2 |
| Tim Raines | 4 | 11 | 3 | .273 | 1 | 5 |
| Gene Kingsale | 3 | 4 | 0 | .000 | 0 | 0 |

=== Pitching ===
==== Starting pitchers ====
Note: G = Games pitched; IP = Innings pitched; W = Wins; L = Losses; ERA = Earned run average; SO = Strikeouts

| Player | G | IP | W | L | ERA | SO |
|---|---|---|---|---|---|---|
| Jason Johnson | 32 | 196.0 | 10 | 12 | 4.09 | 114 |
| José Mercedes | 33 | 184.0 | 8 | 17 | 5.82 | 123 |
| Josh Towers | 24 | 140.1 | 8 | 10 | 4.49 | 58 |
| Sidney Ponson | 23 | 138.1 | 5 | 10 | 4.94 | 84 |
| Pat Hentgen | 9 | 62.1 | 2 | 3 | 3.47 | 33 |
| Rick Bauer | 6 | 33.0 | 0 | 5 | 4.64 | 16 |
| Sean Douglass | 4 | 20.1 | 2 | 1 | 5.31 | 17 |

==== Other pitchers ====
Note: G = Games pitched; IP = Innings pitched; W = Wins; L = Losses; ERA = Earned run average; SO = Strikeouts

| Player | G | IP | W | L | ERA | SO |
|---|---|---|---|---|---|---|
| Willis Roberts | 46 | 132.0 | 9 | 10 | 4.91 | 95 |
| Calvin Maduro | 22 | 93.2 | 5 | 6 | 4.23 | 51 |
| Chuck McElroy | 18 | 45.1 | 1 | 2 | 5.36 | 22 |

===== Relief pitchers =====
Note: G = Games pitched; W = Wins; L = Losses; SV = Saves; ERA = Earned run average; SO = Strikeouts

| Player | G | W | L | SV | ERA | SO |
|---|---|---|---|---|---|---|
| Buddy Groom | 70 | 1 | 4 | 11 | 3.55 | 54 |
| B.J. Ryan | 61 | 2 | 4 | 2 | 4.25 | 54 |
| Mike Trombley | 50 | 3 | 4 | 6 | 3.46 | 45 |
| Ryan Kohlmeier | 34 | 1 | 2 | 6 | 7.30 | 29 |
| John Wasdin | 26 | 1 | 1 | 0 | 4.17 | 47 |
| Chad Paronto | 24 | 1 | 3 | 0 | 5.00 | 16 |
| Jorge Julio | 18 | 1 | 1 | 0 | 3.80 | 22 |
| John Parrish | 16 | 1 | 2 | 0 | 6.14 | 20 |
| Alan Mills | 15 | 1 | 1 | 0 | 9.64 | 9 |
| John Bale | 14 | 1 | 0 | 0 | 3.04 | 21 |
| Kris Foster | 7 | 0 | 0 | 0 | 2.70 | 8 |
| Leslie Brea | 2 | 0 | 0 | 0 | 18.00 | 0 |

== Farm system ==
| Level | Team | League | Manager |
|---|---|---|---|
| AAA | Rochester Red Wings | International League | Andy Etchebarren |
| AA | Bowie Baysox | Eastern League | Dave Machemer |
| A | Frederick Keys | Carolina League | Dave Cash |
| A | Delmarva Shorebirds | South Atlantic League | Joe Ferguson |
| Rookie | Bluefield Orioles | Appalachian League | Joe Almaraz |
| Rookie | GCL Orioles | Gulf Coast League | Jesus Alfaro |

LEAGUE CHAMPIONS: Bluefield
