= 2000 Baltimore Orioles season =

Major League Baseball season

2000 Baltimore Orioles
- League: American League
- Division: East
- Ballpark: Oriole Park at Camden Yards
- City: Baltimore, Maryland
- Record: 74–88 (.457)
- Divisional place: 4th
- Owners: Peter Angelos
- General managers: Syd Thrift
- Managers: Mike Hargrove
- Television: WJZ-TV; Home Team Sports (Jim Palmer, Michael Reghi, Mike Flanagan)
- Radio: WBAL (AM) (Fred Manfra, Jim Hunter, Chuck Thompson)

The 2000 Baltimore Orioles season was the 100th season in Baltimore Orioles franchise history, the 47th in Baltimore, and the 9th at Oriole Park at Camden Yards. The Orioles finished fourth in the American League East with a record of 74 wins and 88 losses.

== Offseason ==
- December 7, 1999: Doug Linton was released by the Baltimore Orioles.
- December 10, 1999: Jesse Orosco was traded by the Baltimore Orioles to the New York Mets for Chuck McElroy.
- December 22, 1999: Buddy Groom was signed as a free agent with the Baltimore Orioles.

== Regular season ==
- Cal Ripken Jr.'s 1999 season ended early due to injury when he was only 9 hits away from joining the 3,000 hit club. He finally achieved the milestone early in the 2000 season when he singled off reliever Héctor Carrasco in a game against the Minnesota Twins on April 15, 2000, in the Metrodome. Ripken had a good night at the plate, getting three hits, the third of which was the milestone. The Twins distributed a commemorative certificate to the fans as they left the Metrodome after the game.
- On October 1, 2000, Albert Belle hit a home run in the last at-bat of his career.

=== Season standings ===
AL East
Team	W	L	Pct.	GB	Home	Road
New York Yankees	87	74	.540	—	44‍–‍36	43‍–‍38
Boston Red Sox	85	77	.525	2½	42‍–‍39	43‍–‍38
Toronto Blue Jays	83	79	.512	4½	45‍–‍36	38‍–‍43
Baltimore Orioles	74	88	.457	13½	44‍–‍37	30‍–‍51
Tampa Bay Devil Rays	69	92	.429	18	36‍–‍44	33‍–‍48

=== Record vs. opponents ===
2000 American League record Source: MLB Standings Grid – 2000
Team	ANA	BAL	BOS	CWS	CLE	DET	KC	MIN	NYY	OAK	SEA	TB	TEX	TOR	NL
Anaheim	—	7–5	5–4	4–6	3–6	5–5	6–6	7–3	5–5	5–8	5–8	6–6	7–5	5–7	12–6
Baltimore	5–7	—	5–7	4–6	5–4	6–4	3–7	6–3	5–7	4–8	3–7	8–5	6–6	7–6	7–11
Boston	4–5	7–5	—	7–5	6–6	7–5	4–6	8–2	6–7	5–5	5–5	6–6	7–3	4–8	9–9
Chicago	6–4	6–4	5–7	—	8–5	9–3	5–7	7–5	8–4	6–3	7–5	6–4	5–5	5–5	12–6
Cleveland	6–3	4–5	6–6	5–8	—	6–7	5–7	5–8	5–5	6–6	7–2	8–2	6–4	8–4	13–5
Detroit	5–5	4–6	5–7	3–9	7–6	—	5–7	7–6	8–4	6–4	7–2	4–5	5–5	3–9	10–8
Kansas City	6–6	7–3	6–4	7–5	7–5	7–5	—	7–5	2–8	4–8	4–8	5–5	3–7	4–6	8–10
Minnesota	3–7	3–6	2–8	5–7	8–5	6–7	5–7	—	5–5	5–7	3–9	4–6	8–4	5–4	7–11
New York	5–5	7–5	7–6	4–8	5–5	4–8	8–2	5–5	—	6–3	4–6	6–6	10–2	5–7	11–6
Oakland	8–5	8–4	5–5	3–6	6–6	4–6	8–4	7–5	3–6	—	9–4	7–2	5–7	7–3	11–7
Seattle	8–5	7–3	5–5	5–7	2–7	2–7	8–4	9–3	6–4	4–9	—	9–3	7–5	8–2	11–7
Tampa Bay	6–6	5–8	6–6	4–6	2–8	5–4	5–5	6–4	6–6	2–7	3–9	—	5–7	5–7	9–9
Texas	5–7	6–6	3–7	5–5	4–6	5–5	7–3	4–8	2–10	7–5	5–7	7–5	—	4–6	7–11
Toronto	7–5	6–7	8–4	5–5	4–8	9–3	6–4	4–5	7–5	3–7	2–8	7–5	6–4	—	9–9

=== Notable transactions ===
- July 28, 2000: Mike Bordick was traded by the Baltimore Orioles to the New York Mets for Lesli Brea, Mike Kinkade, Melvin Mora, and Pat Gorman (minors).
- July 28, 2000: Rich Amaral was released by the Baltimore Orioles.
- July 29, 2000: Charles Johnson was traded by the Baltimore Orioles with Harold Baines to the Chicago White Sox for Brook Fordyce, Jason Lakman (minors), Juan Figueroa (minors), and Miguel Felix (minors).
- July 31, 2000: Will Clark was traded by the Baltimore Orioles with cash to the St. Louis Cardinals for José León.
- July 31, 2000: B. J. Surhoff was traded by the Baltimore Orioles with Gabe Molina to the Atlanta Braves for Trenidad Hubbard, Fernando Lunar, and Luis Rivera.

=== Roster ===
2000 Baltimore Orioles
Roster
Pitchers: 45 Lesli Brea; 19 Scott Erickson; 27 Buddy Groom; 36 Darren Holmes; 41 Jason Johnson; 50 Ryan Kohlmeier; 60 Calvin Maduro; 47 Chuck McElroy; 31 José Mercedes; 72 Alan Mills; 45 Gabe Molina; 35 Mike Mussina; 53 John Parrish; 43 Sidney Ponson; 34 Pat Rapp; 32 Al Reyes; 36 Luis Rivera; 52 B. J. Ryan; 29 Jay Spurgeon; 40 Mike Timlin; 28 Mike Trombley; 36 Tim Worrell	Catchers: 26 Brook Fordyce; 21 Charles Johnson; 51 Fernando Lunar; 56 Willie Morales; 37 Greg Myers; Infielders: 14 Mike Bordick; 12 Will Clark; 65,13 Ivanon Coffie; 18 Jeff Conine; 11 Delino DeShields; 1 Jesse Garcia; 13 Jerry Hairston Jr.; 68 Mike Kinkade; 10,45 Mark Lewis; 10 Ryan Minor; 56,25,13,6 Melvin Mora; 38 Chris Richard; 8 Cal Ripken Jr.	Outfielders: 6 Rich Amaral; 9 Brady Anderson; 88 Albert Belle; 57 Karim García; 23 Trenidad Hubbard; 38 Gene Kingsale; 71,32 Luis Matos; 17 B. J. Surhoff; Other batters: 3 Harold Baines; 80 Carlos Casimiro	Manager: 30 Mike Hargrove; Coaches: 48 Terry Crowley; 49 Sammy Ellis; 24 Brian Graham; 44 Elrod Hendricks; 33 Eddie Murray; 31 Jeff Newman; 2 Sam Perlozzo

== Player stats ==
=== Batting ===
==== Starters by position ====
Note: Pos = Position; G = Games played; AB = At bats; H = Hits; Avg. = Batting average; HR = Home runs; RBI = Runs batted in

Pos	Player	G	AB	H	Avg.	HR	RBI
C	Charles Johnson	84	286	84	.294	21	55
1B	Will Clark	79	256	77	.301	9	28
2B	Delino DeShields	151	561	166	.296	10	86
SS	Mike Bordick	100	391	116	.297	16	59
3B	Cal Ripken Jr.	83	309	79	.256	15	56
LF	B.J. Surhoff	103	411	120	.292	13	57
CF	Brady Anderson	141	506	130	.257	19	50
RF	Albert Belle	141	559	157	.281	23	103
DH	Harold Baines	72	222	59	.266	10	30

==== Other batters ====
Note: G = Games played; AB = At bats; H = Hits; Avg. = Batting average; HR = Home runs; RBI = Runs batted in

Player	G	AB	H	Avg.	HR	RBI
Jeff Conine	119	409	116	.284	13	46
Melvin Mora	53	199	58	.291	2	17
Chris Richard	56	199	55	.276	13	36
Luis Matos	72	182	41	.225	1	17
Jerry Hairston Jr.	49	180	46	.256	5	19
Brook Fordyce	53	177	57	.322	9	28
Mark Lewis	71	163	44	.270	2	21
Greg Myers	43	125	28	.224	3	12
Gene Kingsale	26	88	21	.239	0	9
Ryan Minor	32	84	11	.131	0	3
Rich Amaral	30	60	13	.217	0	6
Ivanon Coffie	23	60	13	.217	0	6
Trenidad Hubbard	31	27	5	.185	0	0
Jesse Garcia	14	17	1	.059	0	0
Fernando Lunar	9	16	2	.125	0	1
Karim García	8	16	0	.000	0	0
Willie Morales	3	11	3	.273	0	0
Carlos Casimiro	2	8	1	.125	0	3
Mike Kinkade	3	7	3	.429	0	1

=== Pitching ===
==== Starting pitchers ====
Note: G = Games pitched; IP = Innings pitched; W = Wins; L = Losses; ERA = Earned run average; SO = Strikeouts

Player	G	IP	W	L	ERA	SO
Mike Mussina	34	237.2	11	15	3.79	210
Sidney Ponson	32	222.0	9	13	4.82	152
Pat Rapp	31	174.0	9	12	5.90	106
Scott Erickson	16	92.2	5	8	7.87	41
John Parrish	8	36.1	2	4	7.18	28

==== Other pitchers ====
Note: G = Games pitched; IP = Innings pitched; W = Wins; L = Losses; ERA = Earned run average; SO = Strikeouts

Player	G	IP	W	L	ERA	SO
José Mercedes	36	145.2	14	7	4.02	70
Jason Johnson	25	107.2	1	10	7.02	79
Jay Spurgeon	7	24.0	1	1	6.00	11
Calvin Maduro	15	23.1	0	0	9.64	18
Lesli Brea	6	9.0	0	1	11.00	5

==== Relief pitchers ====
Note: G = Games pitched; W = Wins; L = Losses; SV = Saves; ERA = Earned run average; SO = Strikeouts

Player	G	W	L	SV	ERA	SO
Ryan Kohlmeier	25	0	1	13	2.39	17
Mike Trombley	75	4	5	4	4.13	72
Buddy Groom	70	6	3	4	4.85	44
Chuck McElroy	43	3	0	0	4.69	50
B.J. Ryan	42	2	3	0	5.91	41
Mike Timlin	37	2	3	11	4.89	26
Alan Mills	23	2	0	1	6.46	18
Al Reyes	13	1	0	0	6.92	10
Gabe Molina	9	0	0	0	9.00	8
Tim Worrell	5	2	2	0	7.36	5
Darren Holmes	5	0	0	0	25.07	6
Luis Rivera	1	0	0	0	0.00	0

== Farm system ==
Level	Team	League	Manager
AAA	Rochester Red Wings	International League	Marv Foley
AA	Bowie Baysox	Eastern League	Andy Etchebarren
A	Frederick Keys	Carolina League	Dave Machemer
A	Delmarva Shorebirds	South Atlantic League	Joe Ferguson
Rookie	Bluefield Orioles	Appalachian League	Duffy Dyer
Rookie	GCL Orioles	Gulf Coast League	Jesus Alfaro

LEAGUE CHAMPIONS: Delmarva

== Awards and records ==
- Albert Belle, American League record, Most RBIs in the final season of a career (103)
