= 2002 Baltimore Orioles season =

Major League Baseball season

2002 Baltimore Orioles
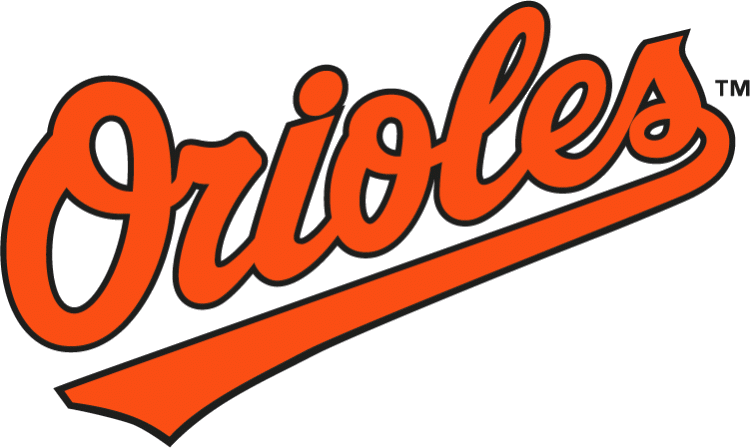
- League: American League
- Division: East
- Ballpark: Oriole Park at Camden Yards
- City: Baltimore, Maryland
- Record: 67–95 (.414)
- Divisional place: 4th
- Owners: Peter Angelos
- General managers: Syd Thrift
- Managers: Mike Hargrove
- Television: WJZ-TV; WNUV; Comcast SportsNet (Jim Palmer, Michael Reghi, Mike Flanagan)
- Radio: WBAL (AM) (Fred Manfra, Jim Hunter, Chuck Thompson)

The 2002 Baltimore Orioles season was the 102nd season in Baltimore Orioles franchise history, the 49th in Baltimore, and the 11th at Oriole Park at Camden Yards. They slightly improved on their 63–98 (.391) record from the previous year, but missed the postseason for the 5th straight season.

The Orioles had a record of 63–63 at the conclusion of play on August 23, but then proceeded to lose 32 of their last 36 games of the season, including their final 12 in a row, and suffered their 5th straight losing season.

== Offseason ==
- October 3, 2001: Tim Raines was sent to the Baltimore Orioles by the Montreal Expos as part of a conditional deal.
- November 20, 2001: Izzy Molina was signed as a free agent with the Baltimore Orioles.

=== Transactions ===
- June 4, 2002: Adam Loewen was drafted by the Baltimore Orioles in the 1st round (4th pick) of the 2002 amateur draft. Player signed May 26, 2003.

== Regular season ==
=== Season standings ===
AL East
Team	W	L	Pct.	GB	Home	Road
New York Yankees	103	58	.640	—	52‍–‍28	51‍–‍30
Boston Red Sox	93	69	.574	10½	42‍–‍39	51‍–‍30
Toronto Blue Jays	78	84	.481	25½	42‍–‍39	36‍–‍45
Baltimore Orioles	67	95	.414	36½	34‍–‍47	33‍–‍48
Tampa Bay Devil Rays	55	106	.342	48	30‍–‍51	25‍–‍55

=== American League Wild Card ===
Division leaders
Team	W	L	Pct.
New York Yankees	103	58	.640
Minnesota Twins	94	67	.584
Oakland Athletics	103	59	.636

Wild Card team (Top team qualifies for postseason)
Team	W	L	Pct.	GB
Anaheim Angels	99	63	.611	—
Boston Red Sox	93	69	.574	6
Seattle Mariners	93	69	.574	6
Chicago White Sox	81	81	.500	18
Toronto Blue Jays	78	84	.481	21
Cleveland Indians	74	88	.457	25
Texas Rangers	72	90	.444	27
Baltimore Orioles	67	95	.414	32
Kansas City Royals	62	100	.383	37
Detroit Tigers	55	106	.342	43½
Tampa Bay Devil Rays	55	106	.342	43½

=== Record vs. opponents ===
2002 American League record Source: MLB Standings Grid – 2002
Team	ANA	BAL	BOS	CWS	CLE	DET	KC	MIN	NYY	OAK	SEA	TB	TEX	TOR	NL
Anaheim	—	7–2	3–4	6–3	6–3	8–1	6–3	4–5	3–4	9–11	9–10	8–1	12–7	7–2	11–7
Baltimore	2–7	—	6–13	3–4	1–5	2–4	7–0	5–1	6–13	4–5	5–4	10–9	3–6	4–15	9–9
Boston	4–3	13–6	—	2–4	5–4	5–4	4–2	3–3	9–10	6–3	4–5	16–3	4–3	13–6	5–13
Chicago	3–6	4–3	4–2	—	9–10	12–7	11–8	8–11	2–4	2–7	5–4	4–3	5–4	4–2	8–10
Cleveland	3–6	5–1	4–5	10–9	—	10–9	9–10	8–11	3–6	2–5	3–4	4–2	4–5	3–3	6–12
Detroit	1–8	4–2	4–5	7–12	9–10	—	9–10	4–14	1–8	1–6	2–5	2–4	5–4	0–6	6–12
Kansas City	3–6	0–7	2–4	8–11	10–9	10–9	—	5–14	1–5	1–8	3–6	4–2	7–2	3–4	5–13
Minnesota	5–4	1–5	3–3	11–8	11–8	14–4	14–5	—	0–6	3–6	5–4	5–2	6–3	6–1	10–8
New York	4–3	13–6	10–9	4–2	6–3	8–1	5–1	6–0	—	5–4	4–5	13–5	4–3	10–9	11–7
Oakland	11–9	5–4	3–6	7–2	5–2	6–1	8–1	6–3	4–5	—	8–11	8–1	13–6	3–6	16–2
Seattle	10–9	4–5	5–4	4–5	4–3	5–2	6–3	4–5	5–4	11–8	—	5–4	13–7	6–3	11–7
Tampa Bay	1–8	9–10	3–16	3–4	2–4	4–2	2–4	2–5	5–13	1–8	4–5	—	4–5	8–11	7–11
Texas	7–12	6–3	3–4	4–5	5–4	4–5	2–7	3–6	3–4	6–13	7–13	5–4	—	8–1	9–9
Toronto	2–7	15–4	6–13	2–4	3–3	6–0	4–3	1–6	9–10	6–3	3–6	11–8	1–8	—	9–9

== Game log ==
Past games legend
Orioles Win	Orioles Loss

2002 Game Log: 67–95 (Home: 27–54; Away: 25–56)
April: 12–14 (Home: 4–7; Away: 8–7)

#	Date	Opponent	Score	Win	Loss	Save	Attendance	Record	Streak/ Box
1	April 1	Yankees	10–3	Erickson	Clemens	—	48,058	1–0	W1
2	April 3	Yankees	0–1	Wells	Johnson	Rivera	32,142	1–1	L1
3	April 4	Yankees	1–4	Mussina	Ponson	Rivera	33,317	1–2	L2
4	April 5	Boston Red Sox	0–3	Lowe	Towers	Urbina	31,261	1–3	L3
5	April 6	Boston Red Sox	2–4	Fossum	Erickson	Urbina	34,978	1–4	L4
6	April 7	Boston Red Sox	1–4	Martinez	Maduro	Urbina	33,790	1–5	L5
7	April 10	Devil Rays	2–3	Wilson	Johnson	Yan	22,781	1–6	L6
8	April 11	Devil Rays	15–6	López	Colomé		24,179	2–6	W1
9	April 12	@ White Sox	2–5	Buehrle	Towers	Foulke	41,128	2–7	L1
10	April 13	@ White Sox	7–3	Osuna	Roberts	Foulke	21,760	2–8	L2
11	April 14	@ White Sox	9–5	Maduro	Wright		23,951	3–8	W1
12	April 15	@ White Sox	4–13	Garland	Johnson		15,794	3–9	L1
13	April 16	@ Yankees	5–4	Bauer	Mendoza	Julio	33,721	4–9	L2
14	April 17	@ Yankees	1–7	Hernández	Towers		27,912	4–10	L1
15	April 18	@ Yankees	7–0	Wells	Erickson		35,212	4–11	L2
16	April 19	@ Devil Rays	6–5 (14)	Julio	Colomé		11,124	5–11	W1
17	April 20	@ Devil Rays	6–3	Johnson	Wilson	Roberts	11,402	6–11	W2
18	April 21	@ Devil Rays	1–2	Creek	Ponson	Yan	13,091	6–12	L1
19	April 23	Boston Red Sox	7–5	Erickson	Castillo	Julio	26,301	7–12	W1
20	April 24	Red Sox	5–3	López	Oliver	Julio	29,004	8–12	W2
21	April 25	Red Sox	0–7	Martinez	Maduro		31,353	8–13	L1
22	April 26	@ Royals	10–5 (10)	Groom	Grimsley		12,372	9–13	W1
23	April 27	@ Royals	9–4	Ponson	Byrd		16,850	10–13	W2
24	April 28	@ Royals	13–0	Erickson	Rekar		15,643	11–13	W3
25	April 29	@ Boston Red Sox	5–3	López	Castillo	Julio	31,177	12–13	W4
26	April 30	@ Boston Red Sox	0–4	Oliver	Maduro		31,751	12–14	L1

== Roster ==
2002 Baltimore Orioles
Roster
Pitchers: 30 Rick Bauer; 51 Steve Bechler; 45 Chris Brock; 47 Sean Douglass; 49 Travis Driskill; 59 Eric DuBose; 19 Scott Erickson; 27 Buddy Groom; 41 Pat Hentgen; 16 Jason Johnson; 50 Jorge Julio; 13 Rodrigo Lopez; 12 Calvin Maduro; 39 Yorkis Pérez; 43 Sidney Ponson; 37 Willis Roberts; 52 B. J. Ryan; 28 John Stephens; 35 Josh Towers	Catchers: 57 Raul Casanova; 26 Brook Fordyce; 17 Gerónimo Gil; 51 Fernando Lunar; 31 Izzy Molina; Infielders: 10 Tony Batista; 14 Mike Bordick; 18 Jeff Conine; 15 Jerry Hairston Jr.; 31 José León; 9 Luis López; 28 Ryan McGuire; 11 Mike Moriarty; 38 Chris Richard; 1 Brian Roberts; 11 Ed Rogers; 23 David Segui	Outfielders: 3 Larry Bigbie; 11 Howie Clark; 40 Marty Cordova; 9 Luis García; 25 Jay Gibbons; 32 Luis Matos; 36 Gary Matthews Jr.; 6 Melvin Mora; 29 Chris Singleton	Manager: 21 Mike Hargrove; Coaches: 48 Terry Crowley; 24 Rick Dempsey; 44 Elrod Hendricks; 2 Sam Perlozzo; 49 Tom Trebelhorn; 34 Mark Wiley

== Player stats ==
=== Batting ===
==== Starters by position ====
- Note: Pos = Position; G = Games played; AB = At bats; H = Hits; Avg. = Batting average; HR = Home runs; RBI = Runs batted in

Pos	Player	G	AB	H	Avg.	HR	RBI
C	Gerónimo Gil	125	422	98	.232	12	45
1B	Jeff Conine	116	451	123	.273	15	63
2B	Jerry Hairston Jr.	122	426	114	.268	5	32
3B	Tony Batista	161	615	150	.244	31	87
SS	Mike Bordick	117	367	85	.232	8	36
LF	Marty Cordova	131	458	116	.253	18	64
CF	Chris Singleton	136	466	122	.262	9	50
RF	Jay Gibbons	136	490	121	.247	28	69
DH	Chris Richard	50	155	36	.232	4	21

==== Other batters ====
- Note: G = Games played; AB = At bats; H = Hits; Avg. = Batting average; HR = Home runs; RBI = Runs batted in

Player	G	AB	H	Avg.	HR	RBI
Melvin Mora	149	557	130	.233	19	64
Gary Matthews Jr.	109	344	95	.276	7	38
Brook Fordyce	56	130	30	.231	1	8
Brian Roberts	38	128	29	.227	1	11
Luis López	52	109	23	.211	2	9
David Segui	26	95	25	.263	2	16
José León	36	89	22	.247	3	10
Howie Clark	14	53	16	.302	0	4
Larry Bigbie	16	34	6	.176	0	3
Luis Matos	17	31	4	.129	0	1
Ryan McGuire	17	26	2	.077	0	2
Mike Moriarty	8	16	3	.188	0	3
Izzy Molina	1	3	1	.333	0	0
Ed Rogers	5	3	0	.000	0	0
Luis García	6	3	1	.333	0	0
Raúl Casanova	2	1	0	.000	0	0
Fernando Lunar	2	0	0	----	0	0

=== Pitching ===
==== Starting pitchers ====
- Note: G = Games pitched; IP = Innings pitched; W = Wins; L = Losses; ERA = Earned run average; SO = Strikeouts

Player	G	IP	W	L	ERA	SO
Rodrigo López	33	196.2	15	9	3.57	136
Sidney Ponson	28	176.0	7	9	4.09	120
Scott Erickson	29	160.2	5	12	5.55	74
Jason Johnson	22	131.1	5	14	4.59	97
John Stephens	12	65.0	2	5	6.09	56
Calvin Maduro	12	56.2	2	5	5.56	29
Pat Hentgen	4	22.0	0	4	7.77	11

==== Other pitchers ====
- Note: G = Games pitched; IP = Innings pitched; W = Wins; L = Losses; ERA = Earned run average; SO = Strikeouts

Player	G	IP	W	L	ERA	SO
Travis Driskill	29	132.2	8	8	4.95	78
Sean Douglass	15	53.1	0	5	6.08	44
Josh Towers	5	27.1	0	3	7.90	13

===== Relief pitchers =====
- Note: G = Games pitched; W = Wins; L = Losses; SV = Saves; ERA = Earned run average; SO = Strikeouts

Player	G	W	L	SV	ERA	SO
Jorge Julio	67	5	6	25	1.99	55
Buddy Groom	70	3	2	2	1.60	48
B.J. Ryan	67	2	1	1	4.68	56
Willis Roberts	66	5	4	1	3.36	51
Rick Bauer	56	6	7	1	3.98	45
Yorkis Pérez	23	0	0	1	3.29	25
Chris Brock	22	2	1	0	4.70	21
Eric DuBose	4	0	0	0	3.00	4
Steve Bechler	3	0	0	0	13.50	3
Érik Bédard	2	0	0	0	13.50	1

== Farm system ==
Level	Team	League	Manager
AAA	Rochester Red Wings	International League	Andy Etchebarren
AA	Bowie Baysox	Eastern League	Dave Cash and Dave Stockstill
A	Frederick Keys	Carolina League	Jack Voigt
A	Delmarva Shorebirds	South Atlantic League	Joe Ferguson
A-Short Season	Aberdeen IronBirds	New York–Penn League	Joe Almaraz
Rookie	Bluefield Orioles	Appalachian League	Don Buford
Rookie	GCL Orioles	Gulf Coast League	Jesus Alfaro
