= Luis Rivera (pitcher) =

Mexican baseball player (born 1978)

Olmecas de Tabasco – No. 36
- Pitcher / Manager / Coach
- Born: June 21, 1978 (age 48); Chihuahua, Chihuahua, Mexico
- Batted: Right Threw: Right

MLB debut
- April 4, 2000, for the Atlanta Braves

Last MLB appearance
- September 20, 2000, for the Baltimore Orioles

MLB statistics
- Win–loss record: 1–0
- Earned run average: 1.23
- Strikeouts: 5
- Stats at Baseball Reference

Teams
- Atlanta Braves (2000); Baltimore Orioles (2000)

Luis Carlos Rivera Gutiérrez (born June 21, 1978) is a Mexican right-handed former professional baseball pitcher and current manager for the Olmecas de Tabasco of the Mexican League. He played in Major League Baseball (MLB) for the Atlanta Braves and Baltimore Orioles. He is 6 feet 3 inches (1.91 m) tall and weighs 163 pounds (74 kg).

== Playing career ==
Prior to being signed as an undrafted free agent by the Atlanta Braves in 1995, he attended Sistema Prepatoria Abierta in Telucha, Mexico.

He began his professional career in 1996 with the rookie-level Gulf Coast League Braves, not playing in American baseball in 1995 because he was loaned by the Braves to the Tigres del Mexico. With the GCL Braves in 1996, he went 1–1 with a 2.59 ERA.

In 1997, he pitched for the Danville Braves and Macon Braves, going a combined 5–1 with a 2.03 ERA in 13 games started. In 62 innings of work, he had 84 strikeouts and 24 walks.

Ranked the 44th best prospect in baseball in 1998 by Baseball America, Rivera went 5–5 with a 3.98 ERA for Macon that season. He struck out 118 batters in 92 2/3 innings that season.

Rivera was ranked the 71st best prospect in baseball by Baseball America in 1999 and the fourth best prospect in the Braves organization. That year he went 0–2 with a 3.11 ERA in 66 2/3 innings. He struck out 81 batters in 66 2/3 innings of work.

In 2000, he was ranked the 51st best prospect in baseball and the fifth best prospect in the Braves organization. He began the season on the Braves' Opening Day roster, making his big league debut on April 4. He made five relief appearances for the Braves, going 1–0 with a 1.35 ERA in 6 2/3 innings of work. He spent time with the GCL Braves and Richmond Braves that year too, going a combined 0–3 with a 6.82 ERA.

On July 31, 2000, Rivera was traded with Trenidad Hubbard and Fernando Lunar to the Baltimore Orioles in exchange for Gabe Molina and B. J. Surhoff. He appeared in only one game for the Orioles, allowing a walk and a hit in 2/3 of an inning. He also appeared in three games with the Rochester Red Wings, going 0–1 with a 3.38 ERA. He played his final big league game on September 20, 2000.

Although he was ranked the fifth best prospect in the Orioles organization in 2001, he did not play at all that year or in 2002. On April 3, 2003, he was released by the Orioles. He has been playing in the Mexican League since then. On June 17, 2009 Rivera signed a minor league contract with the New York Mets, but never pitched for them. In 2010, he appeared in one game for the Dorados de Chihuahua.

== Managerial and coaching career ==
=== Bravos de León ===
Rivera made his managerial debut in May 2017 when he replaced Francisco Estrada as manager of the Bravos de León of the Mexican League. He led the team to a 45–60 record, finishing fifth in the South Zone. After defeating the Rojos del Águila de Veracruz in the postseason wild card, they were swept by the Leones de Yucatán in four games in the next round. On December 13, 2017, he was ratified as manager for the 2018 season.

=== Leones de Yucatán ===
In December 2018, Rivera was appointed as manager of the Leones de Yucatán of the Mexican League. On July 20, 2019, Rivera was dismissed and replaced by Gerónimo Gil; he had a 42–41 record with Yucatán.

=== Bravos de León (second stint) ===
On July 22, 2019, Rivera replaced Antonio Aguilera as manager of the Bravos. Rivera failed to lead the Bravos to the playoffs, ending the team's streak of postseason appearances since its return to the Mexican League in 2017, after a 26-year absence, having qualified in both 2017 and 2018. On November 13, 2019, he was replaced by Tim Johnson.

=== Guerreros de Oaxaca ===
Rivera began the 2025 season as the manager for the Guerreros de Oaxaca of the Mexican League. Rivera was fired by Oaxaca on July 6, 2025.

=== Dorados de Chihuahua ===
On July 10, 2025, Rivera was hired as a coach for the Dorados de Chihuahua of the Mexican League. On September 30, Rivera was fired by the Dorados.

=== Olmecas de Tabasco ===
On October 22, 2025, Rivera was hired to serve as the manager for the Olmecas de Tabasco of the Mexican League ahead of the 2026 season.
