= Butch Huskey =

American baseball player (1971–2026)

- Outfielder
- Born: November 10, 1971; Anadarko, Oklahoma, U.S.
- Died: August 14, 2026 (aged 54); Lawton, Oklahoma, U.S.
- Batted: Right Threw: Right

MLB debut
- September 8, 1993, for the New York Mets

Last MLB appearance
- October 1, 2000, for the Colorado Rockies

MLB statistics
- Batting average: .267
- Home runs: 86
- Runs batted in: 336
- Stats at Baseball Reference

Teams
- New York Mets (1993, 1995–1998); Seattle Mariners (1999); Boston Red Sox (1999); Minnesota Twins (2000); Colorado Rockies (2000)

Robert Leon "Butch" Huskey (November 10, 1971 – August 14, 2026) was an American professional baseball player who played in Major League Baseball in 1993 and from 1995 to 2000, primarily as an outfielder for the New York Mets.

== Early life ==
Huskey grew up in Anadarko, Oklahoma, with his grandmother until she sent him at age 10 or 11 to live with his father, a police officer in Lawton, Oklahoma. He, his five brothers, and three sisters lived there. Because the Oklahoma City 89ers were not far away, he grew up a Texas Rangers fan. He attended Eisenhower High School in Lawton where he played football and was an All-State tight end. He was offered a scholarship to play college football for the Oklahoma Sooners.

== Playing career ==
=== New York Mets ===
==== 1989–1993 ====
The New York Mets selected Huskey in the seventh round of the 1989 Major League Baseball draft as a third baseman. That year, he was awarded the Doubleday Award for the Rookie level Gulf Coast Mets in Sarasota, Florida. Huskey posted a batting average of .263, with six home runs, 34 runs batted in (RBI), and four stolen bases in 54 games. Huskey won a second Doubleday Award following the 1991 season, this time playing for the Columbia Mets of the South Atlantic League as he posted a batting average of .287, with 26 home runs, 99 RBI, and 22 stolen bases. He won the award along with José Martínez, a right-handed pitcher.

Huskey won the award again in 1993, for the Binghamton Mets of the Eastern League, posting a batting average of .251, with 25 home runs, 98 RBI, and 11 stolen bases. By this time, Huskey had been labeled a top prospect by the Mets. Because of this and an injury to Bobby Bonilla, Huskey was promoted, debuting against the Houston Astros on September 8, as Darryl Kile threw a no-hitter against the Mets. Huskey struck out three times. Huskey finished the season in the majors, batting .146 with no home runs and three runs batted in.

==== 1994–1996 ====
Huskey played the entire 1994 campaign with the Norfolk Tides of the International League. He was not able to be recalled again in September, due to a players' strike. He rebounded in 1995, winning a fourth and final Doubleday Award, this time along with right-handed pitcher Jason Isringhausen. Spending the season with Norfolk, he posted a batting average of .284, with 28 home runs, 87 runs batted in, and eight stolen bases. He was rewarded with a September call-up, though he failed to impress at the big league level again, batting .189 with three home runs, 11 runs batted in, and a stolen base.

In 1996, Huskey was primed to compete with backup infielder Edgardo Alfonzo for the starting position at third base for the New York Mets, after the trade of Bonilla to the Baltimore Orioles the previous season. However, the unexpected play of shortstop Rey Ordóñez prompted Dallas Green to alter the infield alignment: Ordonez was awarded the starting shortstop position, with José Vizcaíno shifting to second base, and Jeff Kent shifting to third base. Huskey was moved to right field, a position he had only played once previously at the major league level. He struggled defensively in the outfield, soon finding himself being replaced by more athletic natural outfielders including Carl Everett and Alex Ochoa. However, Huskey soon found himself in a platoon role with first baseman Rico Brogna, a left-handed hitter. Huskey went on to be the Mets' regular first baseman that year, finishing with a .278 average, 15 home runs, 60 runs batted in, and one stolen base.

==== 1997–1998 ====
1997 proved to be another tumultuous season for the young right-hander. With incumbent third baseman Jeff Kent traded away, Huskey was awarded the opening day third baseman's job. However, Huskey again struggled defensively, and was benched in favor of Edgardo Alfonzo, who went on to have a breakout season. Huskey once again found himself in right field, sharing time with the struggling Everett and Ochoa. The season turned out be his most successful and he posted a batting average of .287, with 24 home runs, 81 runs batted in, and eight stolen bases and included a 20 game hitting streak . Huskey was only 25 years old, and some scouts compared him to Mark McGwire. One highlight of Huskey's 1997 season came on September 15, when he hit a home run off Philadelphia Phillies pitcher Matt Beech which landed in section 638 of Veterans Stadium. He became only the third player to hit a ball into the stadium's 600 level, following Willie Stargell and Rubén Rivera. Jim Thome would be the only other player to reach the 600 level with a batted ball before the stadium closed following the 2003 season.

Huskey regressed offensively in 1998, posting a batting average of .252, with 13 home runs, 59 runs batted in, and seven stolen bases. Following the season, general manager Steve Phillips made several trades to re-make the Mets. On November 11, the Mets re-acquired Bobby Bonilla, from the Los Angeles Dodgers, this time to play right field, in exchange for pitcher Mel Rojas. On December 14, the Mets traded Huskey to the Seattle Mariners in exchange for pitcher Lesli Brea.

=== Later career (1999–2001) ===
Huskey was expected to have a limited bench role with Seattle, however his bat (15 home runs in only 262 at-bats) earned him more and more playing time. Since Seattle had no playoff hopes at midseason, they traded Huskey to the Boston Red Sox on July 26, 1999 for pitcher Robert Ramsay. Huskey served as a right-handed complement to Boston's left-handed designated hitter, Brian Daubach. Huskey performed well in Boston, hitting seven home runs down in the second half of the season in only 124 at-bats and helped the Red Sox to a wild card berth.

He signed a one-year contract with the Minnesota Twins on January 27, 2000. As the Twins' everyday designated hitter, but he struggled offensively, hitting only five home runs in 215 at-bats. He was demoted in July. On July 15, he was traded with Todd Walker to the Colorado Rockies in exchange for Todd Sears and cash. The Rockies were in a pennant race and looking for power off their bench. Huskey did not disappoint, hitting four home runs in only 92 at-bats while playing mostly left field.

On January 26, 2001, Huskey signed a one-year contract with the Cleveland Indians. He failed to make the team in spring training and was released. He played for the Rockies' Triple-A affiliate, the Colorado Springs Sky Sox, in 2001, hitting .323 with 19 home runs.

== Uniform number ==
With the Mets, Huskey started out his career in 1993 wearing number 10, and then wore the number 42 for the rest of his Mets career from 1995 to 1998 when MLB retired the number in honor of Jackie Robinson on April 15, 1997, in a game between the Mets and Los Angeles Dodgers at Shea Stadium. A grandfather clause permitted Huskey to wear the number for the remainder of his career, if he so chose, no matter the team(s) for which he played. He thus changed his number to 44 with the Red Sox in 1999, then reverted to 42 with the Twins, before finishing out his career with the Rockies wearing number 35. Huskey was one of the last players in MLB to wear the number 42, and was the last Seattle Mariner to do so.

== In popular culture ==
Huskey is mentioned in the Yo La Tengo song "Moby Octopad" (from the 1997 album I Can Hear the Heart Beating as One).

== Death ==
Huskey died from a pulmonary embolism on August 14, 2026, at the age of 54.
