= Gabe Molina =

American baseball player (born 1975)

- Pitcher
- Born: May 3, 1975 (age 50); Denver, Colorado, U.S.
- Batted: Right Threw: Right

MLB debut
- May 1, 1999, for the Baltimore Orioles

Last MLB appearance
- May 26, 2003, for the St. Louis Cardinals

MLB statistics
- Win–loss record: 2–2
- Earned run average: 6.58
- Strikeouts: 28
- Stats at Baseball Reference

Teams
- Baltimore Orioles (1999–2000); Atlanta Braves (2000); St. Louis Cardinals (2002–2003)

Cruz Gabriel Molina (born May 3, 1975) is an American former Major League Baseball (MLB) right-handed relief pitcher who played for the Baltimore Orioles, Atlanta Braves, and St. Louis Cardinals between 1999 and 2003.

== Early life ==
A native of Denver, Colorado, Molina attended Kennedy High School and Arizona State University. In 1994, he played collegiate summer baseball with the Bourne Braves of the Cape Cod Baseball League, and returned to the league in 1995, to play for the Orleans Cardinals.

== Career ==
=== Baltimore Orioles ===
Drafted by the Orioles in the 21st round of the 1996 amateur draft and signed by scout John Green, Molina began his professional career that year with the Bluefield Orioles. In 23 relief appearances, he went 4–0 with a 3.60 ERA, striking out 33 batters in 30 innings of work. Winning the Appalachian League Championship closing out the final game. The following year, he pitched for the Delmarva Shorebirds, and he went 8–6 with a 2.18 ERA in 46 relief appearances. He struck out 119 batters in 91 innings as well. Again winning the South Atlantic Championship and closing out the final game. In 1998, pitching for the Bowie Baysox, Molina went 3–2 with 24 saves and a 3.36 ERA in 61 2/3 innings. He struck out 75 batters and was named Pitcher of the Year for the Baltimore organization.

Molina began the 1999 season with the Rochester Red Wings, going 2–2 with 18 saves and a 3.14 ERA in 45 relief appearances for them. On May 1, he made his big league debut, pitching against the Minnesota Twins. He allowed a hit and a walk in an inning of work, but he gave up no earned runs. He then allowed a three-run home run to Andy Morales in an exhibition game against the Cuban national baseball team four days later. Overall, he made 20 appearances in the Majors in 1999, going 1–2 with a 3.65 ERA. He walked 6 batters and struck out 14. According to Baseball America, he was ranked the 10th best prospect in the Orioles organization in 1999.

He spent time in the majors and minors in 2000, in two different organizations. For the Baltimore Orioles, he appeared in nine games and posted a 5.00 ERA in 13 innings. For the Red Wings, he went 1–2 with a 3.94 ERA in 18 games. He started four games for them, the first starts of his professional career.

=== Atlanta Braves ===
On July 31, 2000, Molina was traded with B. J. Surhoff to the Braves for Trenidad Hubbard, Fernando Lunar and Luis Rivera. He made two appearances for the Braves. With the Atlanta Braves, he pitched two innings, allowing one earned run. With Richmond, he went 1–0 with a 3.60 ERA in nine relief appearances. Overall, he went 0–0 with a 4.50 ERA in 11 relief appearances in 2000. He went 2–2 with a 3.58 ERA in the minor leagues. He was granted free agency on December 21

=== Florida Marlins, St. Louis Cardinals, Colorado Rockies ===
Molina was signed by the Florida Marlins on January 10, 2001. He appeared in 40 games (16 starts) for the Calgary Cannons, their minor league affiliate, going 9–2 with a 3.89 ERA. He was granted free agency on October 15. He was signed by the Cardinals on November 28, 2001.

Although he never got a true opportunity in the majors throughout his career, his 2002 season would prove to be a major improvement, if not a pleasant surprise. He appeared in 56 games for the Cardinals AAA team the Memphis Redbirds, going 5–4 with a 2.15 ERA, saving 12 games. In 12 major league appearances, he went 1–0 with a 1.59 ERA.

In 2003, going 2–9 with a 3.09 ERA in 57 relief appearances for the Redbirds, and 0–0 with a 13.53 ERA in three relief appearances for the Cardinals. He appeared in his final major league game on May 26.

In 2004, he did not play in American affiliated baseball. In 2005, he pitched for the Colorado Springs Sky Sox, in the Colorado Rockies farm system. In 45 games with them, he went 10–2 with a 3.86 ERA.

=== Summary ===
Overall, Molina went 2–2 in 46 major league relief appearances. In 52 innings, he walked 23 batters, struck out 48 and posted a 4.58 ERA.
