= Brook Fordyce =

American baseball player (born 1970)

Keiser Seahawks
- Catcher / Coach
- Born: May 7, 1970 (age 56); New London, Connecticut, U.S.
- Batted: Right Threw: Right

MLB debut
- April 26, 1995, for the New York Mets

Last MLB appearance
- October 2, 2004, for the Tampa Bay Devil Rays

MLB statistics
- Batting average: .258
- Home runs: 41
- Runs batted in: 188
- Stats at Baseball Reference

Teams
- New York Mets (1995); Cincinnati Reds (1996–1998); Chicago White Sox (1999–2000); Baltimore Orioles (2000–2003); Tampa Bay Devil Rays (2004)

Brook Alexander Fordyce (born May 7, 1970) is an American former professional baseball catcher. He played in Major League Baseball (MLB) for the New York Mets, Cincinnati Reds, Chicago White Sox, Baltimore Orioles and the Tampa Bay Devil Rays between 1995 and 2004. He batted and threw right-handed.

During his career, he established himself as a good-hitting catcher. His best year came in 2000 when he played 40 games with the White Sox and 53 games for the Orioles. In that year, he hit .301, 14 home runs, and 49 RBI.

== Early life ==
Born in New London, Connecticut, Fordyce is a graduate of Saint Bernard High School in Uncasville, Connecticut. He played high school football and baseball until he injured a nerve in his neck at the age of 16. After recovering from the injury, he focused on baseball.

== Career ==
Fordyce was a third-round draft selection of the New York Mets in 1989. He spent the next several years in the minor leagues. Through 1996, he had played in only eight MLB games for the Mets and Cincinnati Reds. He spent parts of the next two seasons in the major leagues with the Reds, until a trade took him to the Chicago White Sox. He played his most complete season for the 1999 White Sox, batting .297 in 105 games.

After being traded from the White Sox to the Orioles in the middle of the 2000 season, Fordyce batted .322 in 53 games with Baltimore. He was the primary starting catcher for the first half of the 2001 season, but struggled offensively. It took him 21 games to drive in a run, and his batting average never got within 100 points of his performance with the team the previous year. Fordyce did not see as much playing time late in the season, and he finished the 2001 season with a .209 batting average in 95 games. He also had the worst fielding percentage among the league's catchers.

In January 2002, Fordyce was hospitalized with severe bleeding from his gastrointestinal tract, spending several days in intensive care, but he was able to report to spring training on time the next month. Orioles manager Mike Hargrove indicated he was not declaring a number one catcher and said that Fordyce would compete for the job with young prospects Fernando Lunar and Geronimo Gil.

In 2003, Fordyce battled Gil for the starting catching job on the Orioles. Gil had the upper hand leading into the season, but Fordyce played well initially and earned more playing time than expected. In 108 games that year, Fordyce batted .273. He concluded his career with the Tampa Bay Rays in 2004, hitting .205 in 54 games.

== Personal life ==
After retiring in 2004, Fordyce opened Frozen Ropes Baseball Academy and established youth teams. In 2011, he went into coaching, and since 2018, he has been the head coach of Keiser University's baseball team.

Fordyce lives in Jensen Beach, Florida, and has three daughters.
