= Luis García (outfielder) =

Mexican baseball player (born 1975)

- Pinch hitter / Pinch runner / Outfielder
- Born: September 22, 1975 (age 50); Hermosillo, Sonora, Mexico
- Batted: Switch Threw: Right

MLB debut
- April 10, 2002, for the Baltimore Orioles

Last MLB appearance
- May 30, 2002, for the Baltimore Orioles

MLB statistics
- Games played: 6
- At bats: 3
- Hit(s): 1
- Stats at Baseball Reference

Teams
- Baltimore Orioles (2002)

Career highlights and awards
- Mexican League Rookie of the Year Award (1999)
Medals
Men's baseball
Representing Mexico
Pan American Games
Bronze medal – third place	2003 Santo Domingo	Team competition
Central American and Caribbean Games
Bronze medal – third place	2006 Cartagena	National team

Luis Carlos García (born September 22, 1975) is a Mexican former Major League Baseball outfielder who played with the Baltimore Orioles in 2002. He made the team's Opening Day roster, but was optioned to the Rochester Red Wings on April 12 after playing in two games without a plate appearance. He was recalled a month later on May 17. Garcia played for the Dorados de Chihuahua of the Mexican League in 2010.
