= Izzy Molina =

American baseball player (born 1971)

- Catcher
- Born: June 3, 1971 (age 54); New York City, New York, U.S.
- Batted: Right Threw: Right

MLB debut
- August 15, 1996, for the Oakland Athletics

Last MLB appearance
- May 6, 2002, for the Baltimore Orioles

MLB statistics
- Batting average: .206
- Home runs: 3
- Runs batted in: 8
- Stats at Baseball Reference

Teams
- Oakland Athletics (1996–1998); Baltimore Orioles (2002)

Islay "Izzy" Molina (born June 3, 1971) is an American former professional baseball catcher for the Oakland Athletics and Baltimore Orioles of Major League Baseball (MLB).

Molina is not related to the brothers Bengie, Jose, and Yadier Molina, although like Izzy, all three are catchers.

== Career ==
Molina was drafted out of high school by the Oakland Athletics in the 22nd round of the 1990 Major League Baseball draft and made his professional debut that same year for the Arizona League Athletics where he batted .339 in 39 games. He made his major league debut for Oakland on August 15, 1996. Molina left the Athletics via free agency after the 1998 season. On October 26, 1998, he signed with the Arizona Diamondbacks, but was traded to the New York Yankees with Ben Ford for Darren Holmes in spring training 1999.

Over the next three years, Molina did not play in the majors while spending time in the minors with the Yankees, Royals, and Blue Jays organization.

He signed a minor-league contract with the Baltimore Orioles on November 20, 2001. He began the 2002 season with the Double-A Bowie Baysox and was promoted to the Triple-A Rochester Red Wings. Two weeks after his contract was purchased from the Red Wings on May 3, he cleared waivers and was outrighted to the Baysox on May 17. During this stint he made his only appearance with the Orioles in a 9–4 defeat to the Cleveland Indians at Camden Yards on May 6. He had a fifth-inning single in three at bats and scored a run as the starting catcher. Molina last played professional baseball in 2003 with the Orioles Single-A, Double-A, and Triple-A teams.
