= Ed Rogers =

Dominican baseball player (born 1978)

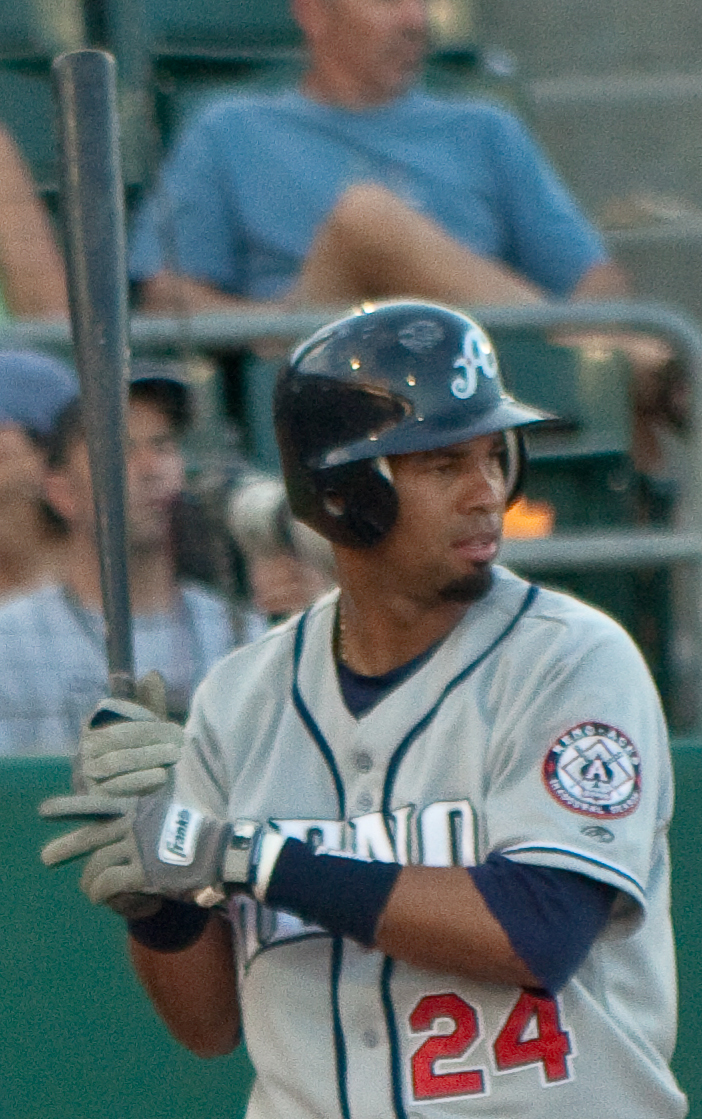
- Infielder
- Born: August 29, 1978 (age 47); San Pedro de Macoris, Dominican Republic
- Batted: Right Threw: Right

MLB debut
- September 5, 2002, for the Baltimore Orioles

Last MLB appearance
- July 8, 2006, for the Baltimore Orioles

MLB statistics
- Batting average: .207
- Home runs: 1
- Runs batted in: 4
- Stats at Baseball Reference

Teams
- Baltimore Orioles (2002, 2005–2006)

Edward Antonio Rogers (born August 29, 1978) is a Dominican former utility infielder who played with the Baltimore Orioles. He bats and throws right-handed.

== Career ==
=== Baltimore Orioles ===
Rogers was signed by the Baltimore Orioles as a free agent in 1997. He debuted in Major League Baseball with the Orioles, playing for them in parts of three seasons between 2002 and 2006. In 2005, he hit his only major league home run in his only at-bat of the season. It came against Alan Embree of the New York Yankees.

During a 2006 game against the New York Mets, as Rogers came in to pick up a bloop single into left field, the ball took an odd hop and went up his sleeve and he had to reach into the back of his shirt to get it out.

=== Boston Red Sox ===
Before the 2007 season, Rogers signed a minor league contract with the Boston Red Sox and was invited to spring training. During an exhibition game, on March 7, he hit a walk-off home run to beat the New York Mets, 9–5. In the 2007-2008 offseason, he signed a minor league contract with the Washington Nationals. Rogers began the 2008 season with the Double-A Harrisburg Senators of the Eastern League and also saw time with the Triple-A Columbus Clippers. He became a free agent at the end of the season.

=== Arizona Diamondbacks ===
On June 4, 2009, Rogers signed a Minor League deal with the Arizona Diamondbacks organization.

He was granted Free Agency at end of 2009 Season
