= Ivanon Coffie =

Dutch baseball player (born 1977)

- Third baseman
- Born: 16 May 1977 (age 49); Klein, Curaçao
- Batted: Left Threw: Right

MLB debut
- 15 July, 2000, for the Baltimore Orioles

Last MLB appearance
- 20 September, 2000, for the Baltimore Orioles

MLB statistics
- Batting average: .217
- Runs scored: 6
- Stolen bases: 1
- Stats at Baseball Reference

Teams
- Baltimore Orioles (2000)
Medals
Men's baseball
Representing Netherlands
Intercontinental Cup
Silver medal – second place	2006 Taiwan	National team
European Baseball Championship
Gold medal – first place	2005 Czech Republic	National team

Ivanon Angelino Coffie (EE-vah-nahn, born 16 May 1977) is a Curaçaoan former professional baseball player. He played in Major League Baseball for the Baltimore Orioles during the 2000 season, appearing in 23 games. He played for the Netherlands national team in international tournaments.

== Playing career ==
Coffie signed with the Orioles on July 28, 1995 as an international free agent. He made his professional debut in the Gulf Coast League in 1996, batting .218 leading shortstops in fielding percentage. A shoulder injury ended his 1997 season in August. With the Frederick Keys in 1998, he was named a Carolina League All-Star and won the league's home run derby. He was added to the Orioles' 40-man roster before spring training in 1999, but hit .183 with the Double-A Bowie Baysox before being sent down to Frederick.

Coffie began the 2000 season with Bowie and was named the Eastern League Player of the Week the opening week of the season. He was called up to the Orioles on July 15, making his MLB debut that day as a pinch runner. He was the fifth player from Curaçao to play in the majors. He got his first MLB hit the next day, a single off Ricky Bones of the Florida Marlins. Coffie was sent down to Triple-A on August 11, returning to the majors as a September call-up. He batted .217 with 6 RBI and one stolen base in his lone major league season. After the season, he played for the Mesa Solar Sox in the Arizona Fall League.

Coffie continued playing organized baseball until 2010. He played one more season in the Orioles farm system, missing almost three months with a broken right index finger. Baltimore traded him to the Chicago Cubs in November 2001. He was released after a season with the Iowa Cubs and signed with the St. Louis Cardinals, who released him in April 2003. After playing four games for the independent Fargo–Moorhead RedHawks, he re-signed with the Orioles. He signed with the Houston Astros in 2004, playing for the Double-A Round Rock Express in his final season in affiliated baseball.

Coffie played for Almere'90 in the Dutch Honkbal Hoofdklasse in 2005, leading the league in home runs, and 2006. He played in the Chinese Professional Baseball League for parts two seasons with the Macoto Cobras/dmedia T-REX in 2007 and 2008, as well as Neptunus in the Hoofdklasse. He also played for the Lancaster Barnstormers of the Atlantic League in 2008. Then, he played in the Italian Baseball League, with Rimini in 2009 and Grosseto in 2010.

== International career ==
Coffie made his debut with the Netherlands national team at the 2003 Baseball World Cup, batting .409 with two home runs. At the 2004 Summer Olympics in Athens, the Dutch team finished in sixth place. He batted .105 with 4 RBI in 6 games. He was named the most valuable player of the 2005 European Baseball Championship after slugging 8 home runs in 9 games. He played in the 2005 Baseball World Cup and 2006 World Baseball Classic, where he went 2-for-12 in three games and committed an error during Shairon Martis's no-hitter against Panama. He was on the Dutch team that finished second in the 2006 Intercontinental Cup. He then played for the Dutch in the 2007 World Port Tournament, batting .125 in 8 games.

== Personal life ==
Coffie graduated from high school in Curaçao in 1995.

After his playing career, Coffie has coached baseball and softball at a training facility in Valley City, Ohio.
