= Lesli Brea =

Dominican baseball player (born 1973)

- Pitcher
- Born: October 12, 1973 (age 52); San Pedro de Macorís, Dominican Republic
- Batted: Right Threw: Right

MLB debut
- August 13, 2000, for the Baltimore Orioles

Last MLB appearance
- June 16, 2001, for the Baltimore Orioles

MLB statistics
- Win–loss record: 0–1
- Earned run average: 12.27
- Strikeouts: 5
- Stats at Baseball Reference

Teams
- Baltimore Orioles (2000–2001)

Lesli Guillermo Brea (born October 12, 1973) is a Dominican former Major League Baseball player. A right-handed relief pitcher, Brea is 5 feet 11 inches (1.80 m) tall, and he weighed 170 pounds during his playing career. Some records list his year of birth as 1978, but this figure was subsequently found to be inaccurate.

== Baseball career ==
=== Minor leagues ===
In 1996, Brea began his professional career by signing with the Seattle Mariners as an undrafted free agent. He was 22 years old, but represented himself as a 17-year-old in order to secure a more favorable response from Mariners scouts. Baseball scouts are sometimes reluctant to sign older international players, since younger players are generally farther from their physical peak, and thus are perceived as having a comparatively higher ceiling to their future performance.

Brea established himself as a prospect in 1998, when he saved 12 games as the closer for the Wisconsin Timber Rattlers of the Midwest League. He compiled a 2.76 ERA and struck out 86 batters in only 58 2/3 innings pitched, but also struggled to control his pitches, walking 40 batters and throwing five wild pitches. This type of performance would continue to be the norm as Brea advanced through the minors; he finished his professional career with more than a strikeout per inning pitched, but also walked almost five batters per nine innings.

=== Trades ===
Brea was involved in two noteworthy trades before reaching the major leagues. On December 14, 1998, the Mariners traded Brea to the New York Mets, in exchange for outfielder Butch Huskey. Huskey played well as a regular for the Mariners in 1999, before being traded to the Boston Red Sox at midseason.

Two years later, Brea was one of six players involved in a trade deadline deal between the Mets and the Baltimore Orioles. The Mets sent Brea, Melvin Mora, Mike Kinkade, and pitching prospect Pat Gorman to the Orioles, receiving All-Star shortstop Mike Bordick. Bordick helped the Mets reach the 2000 World Series, but the deal was costly for the Mets, as Mora developed into a star and Bordick returned to the Orioles as a free agent that off-season. Questions about Brea's actual age surfaced after the deal, embarrassing Orioles' General Manager Syd Thrift.

=== Major leagues ===
Brea made his major league debut on August 13, 2000, starting against the Kansas City Royals. In his only major league start, he surrendered six runs in 3 1/3 innings, and the Orioles lost 10–5. Over the next two years, he pitched in eight major league games, surrendering 15 earned runs in 11 innings, for an ERA of 12.27. Control continued to be a problem, as he walked 13 batters and struck out only five, also hitting one batter and throwing one wild pitch. The loss on August 13 was his only decision.

Brea left the Orioles as a minor league free agent after the 2002 season. He signed with the Tampa Bay Devil Rays but did not make the team out of spring training and was released on March 10, 2003. Brea spent the remainder of that year, his last as a professional, with the Somerset Patriots of the Atlantic League.
