= Kris Foster =

American baseball player (born 1974)

- Pitcher
- Born: August 30, 1974 (age 52); Riverdale, New Jersey, U.S.
- Batted: Right Threw: Right

MLB debut
- August 3, 2001, for the Baltimore Orioles

Last MLB appearance
- October 5, 2001, for the Baltimore Orioles

MLB statistics
- Win–loss record: 0–0
- Earned run average: 2.70
- Strikeouts: 8
- Stats at Baseball Reference

Teams
- Baltimore Orioles (2001)

John Kristian Foster (born August 30, 1974) is an American former professional baseball pitcher. He played in Major League Baseball (MLB) for the Baltimore Orioles in 2001.
