= Mike Hargrove =

American baseball player and coach (born 1949)

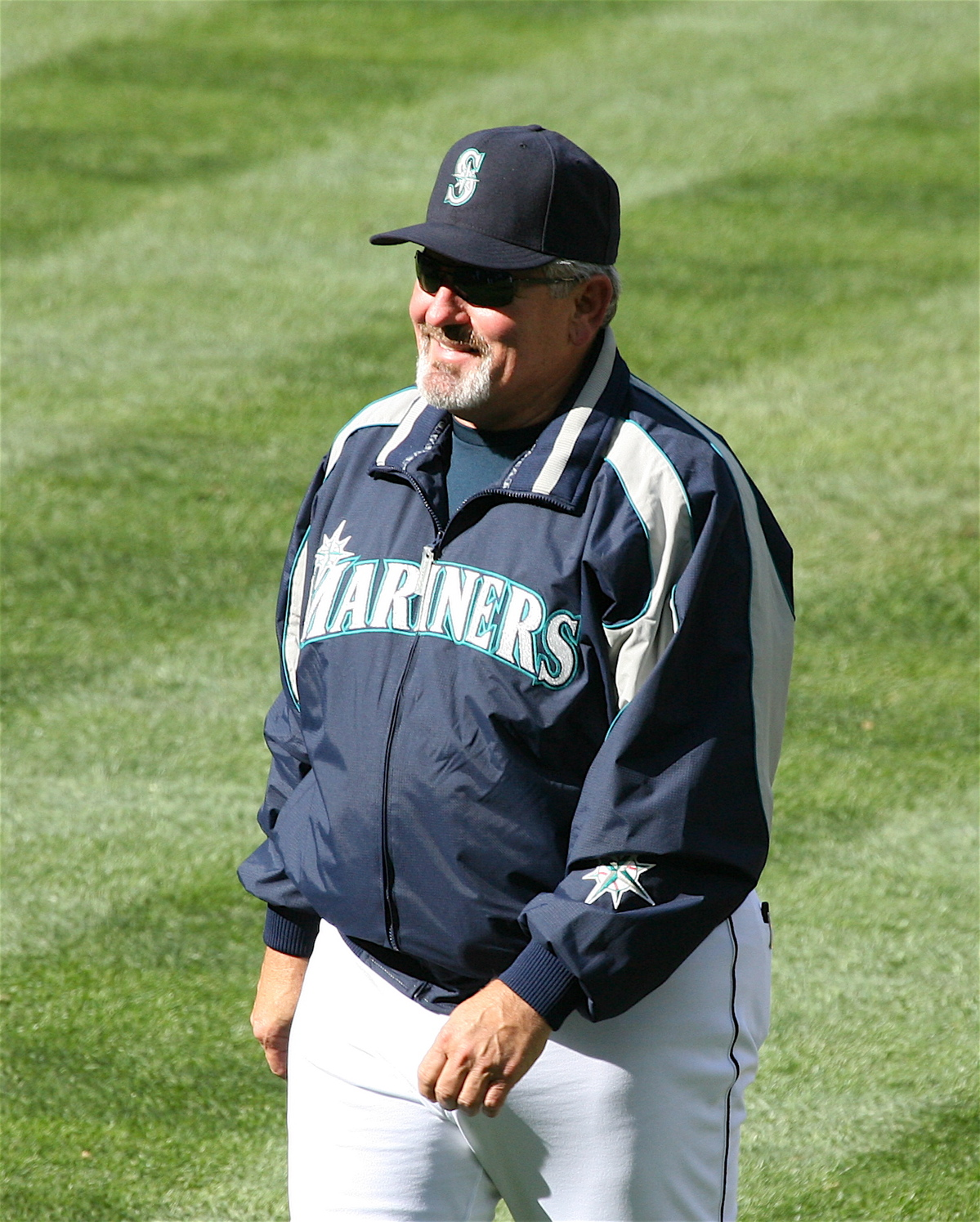
- Hargrove with the Seattle Mariners in 2007
- First baseman / Manager
- Born: October 26, 1949 (age 77); Perryton, Texas, U.S.
- Batted: Left Threw: Left

MLB debut
- April 7, 1974, for the Texas Rangers

Last MLB appearance
- October 6, 1985, for the Cleveland Indians

MLB statistics
- Batting average: .290
- Home runs: 80
- Runs batted in: 686
- Managerial record: 1,188-1,173
- Winning %: .503
- Stats at Baseball Reference
- Managerial record at Baseball Reference

Teams
- As player: Texas Rangers (1974–1978); San Diego Padres (1979); Cleveland Indians (1979–1985); As manager: Cleveland Indians (1991–1999); Baltimore Orioles (2000–2003); Seattle Mariners (2005–2007); As coach: Cleveland Indians (1990–1991)

Career highlights and awards
- All-Star (1975); AL Rookie of the Year (1974); Cleveland Guardians Hall of Fame

Dudley Michael Hargrove (born October 26, 1949) is an American former professional baseball first baseman and manager. He is currently employed as an advisor with the Cleveland Guardians in Major League Baseball (MLB). Hargrove batted and threw left-handed. He played for the Texas Rangers (1974–1978), San Diego Padres (1979), and Cleveland Indians (1979–1985). After retiring, he went on to manage the Indians from 1991 to 1999, the Baltimore Orioles from 2000 to 2003, and the Seattle Mariners from 2005 to 2007. He often went by the nickname "Grover" as a play on his surname.

== Playing career ==
1980 photocard of Hargrove for Cleveland Indians

During his 12-year playing career, Hargrove batted .290 with 80 home runs and 686 runs batted in. He won both the AL Rookie of the Year and The Sporting News Rookie of the Year awards in 1974, after hitting a career-high .323 with the Rangers (he was the first Rangers player ever to be so honored). Afterwards, he made the AL All-Star squad in 1975 and led the league first basemen in assists twice. He was most effective in getting on base, moving runners, and not giving up an easy out—unusual for a first baseman which is usually considered a power position.

Though he would later be honored as one of the Cleveland Indians' top 100 players in team history, one of Hargrove's early visits to Cleveland was less than memorable. As a rookie with the Rangers, Hargrove was one of the early targets of Cleveland fans during the infamous Ten Cent Beer Night incident on June 4, 1974.

Hargrove also attained the nickname "the Human Rain Delay" for his deliberate routine at the plate before each at-bat and before each pitch. He irritated pitchers by stepping out of the batter's box after each pitch and starting his routine, which consisted of (1) adjusting his helmet, (2) adjusting his batting glove, making sure it was tight on his hand and especially the thumb, (3) pulling each sleeve on his uniform up about an inch, and (4) wiping each hand on his uniform pants – and then sometimes repeating the whole process — before finally settling back into the box. Towards the end of his career this trait was very well known and often commented upon by broadcasters. Adding further to his "Human Rain Delay" moniker was his extremely fine bat control, which allowed him to foul off pitches.

Through June 16, 2009, Hargrove was tied for second of all Rangers players ever in career leadoff home runs, one behind the 9 by Ian Kinsler.

== Managing career ==
=== Cleveland Indians ===
Hargrove worked as first base coach for Cleveland before being promoted to manager in 1991 to replace John McNamara, who was fired 77 games into the season. The Indians finished with 105 losses, most in team history while finishing in last place in the division. For the rest of Hargrove's tenure, they would finish above last place. The next two Cleveland teams finished with 76 wins each, but the talent would rise to cultivation soon enough. The 1994 team was 66–47 and fighting for a potential playoff spot before the August strike killed the season.

He led his team to five consecutive AL Central Division titles in 1995–99 (being the first and so far only Cleveland manager to reach the postseason in five straight years), and World Series appearances in 1995 and 1997.

The 1995 Indians won 100 games in the 144 game season (shortened due to the late start by the 1994 strike), becoming the first American League team to win 100 games in fewer than 154 games, comprised by a confident team led by Albert Belle (2nd in MVP voting) Jose Mesa (1.13 ERA), Kenny Lofton (54 stolen bases), Manny Ramirez (.308), Jim Thome, among others. They made their first playoff appearance since 1954. They won the 1995 American League Division Series in a three game sweep of the Boston Red Sox for their first postseason series victory since 1948 and then won the 1995 American League Championship Series over the Seattle Mariners for their first pennant since 1954. They played the Atlanta Braves in the 1995 World Series and lost in six games, as a team that hit .291 in the regular season hit .179 in the Series against Greg Maddux, John Smoltz, and Tom Glavine. The 1996 team won 99 games, making it the first time Cleveland had back-to-back 90-win seasons since the 1950-1955 seasons. Despite having eleven more wins than the Wild Card Baltimore Orioles, they lost in four games in the 1996 American League Division Series.

The 1997 team won 86 games, which was good enough to win the AL Central. They beat the defending world champion New York Yankees in a tight five game series before facing the Orioles, who had the best record in the AL. The series was a tight affair that saw five games be decided by one run (the biggest margin was three, in Game 1) while Cleveland won two of the games in extra innings. They won the series in six games despite being outscored 19–18. In the 1997 World Series, they faced the Florida Marlins, a team in their fifth season of play. The Indians won Games 2, 4, and 6 and were two outs from winning the Series in Game 7 before José Mesa allowed the tying run to score in the 9th inning. Charles Nagy gave up the winning run in the 11th, as Cleveland lost the series despite outscoring the Marlins 44-37.

On June 20, 1998, Hargrove, who had been wearing #21 to that point, switched to #30 to accommodate the Indians retiring #21 in honor of Bob Lemon. In the 1998 American League Championship Series, the Indians led the series by winning two of the first three against the New York Yankees. However, they were outscored by a margin of 18-8 in the next three games to lose the series, which was the last ALCS appearance for Cleveland until 2007.

A managing error by Hargrove on July 22, 1999, led to the first Indians pitcher to bat in an American League park since 1977, as Manny Ramirez was penciled in at the designated hitter position while Alex Ramirez was listed at right field, but somehow Manny entered the game at right field, thereby nullifying the DH when the opposing manager noticed. Charles Nagy had to bat and pitch at the DH spot (7th) in the eventual loss. The Indians lost in the 1999 American League Division Series after winning the first two games over Boston (in their third matchup in the last five years), as their starting pitching faltered, seeing their Game 3 starter leave after four innings and their Game 4 starter have to start on three days rest. In Game 4, Cleveland lost 23–7 and then lost 12–8 in Game 5 in Cleveland. He was fired on October 15, 1999, by general manager John Hart despite being under contract for 2000 with an option for 2001. The decision was made not due to the collapse in the series but rather one done over internal discussions internally past week, citing a need for a new atmosphere. Hargrove felt that the team lacked a true ace in pitching, while Hart felt that the team they had assembled on budget was a quality one; private sources felt Hargrove had lost the clubhouse, and he admitted that he may have been thought of as a distant manager. He was the longest tenured Indians manager since Lou Boudreau (1942–1950), and his 721–591 record was second best in club history.

=== Baltimore Orioles ===
On November 3, 1999, the Baltimore Orioles signed Hargrove to manage the club on a three-year contract. Hargrove was the second manager hired after the Orioles had fired Davey Johnson in 1997 (who Hargrove had faced in the 1996 ALDS and 1997 ALCS, winning the latter). He proved to be the second of seven managers that led Baltimore to a fifteen year drought from the postseason, with Hargrove finishing in fourth place in four seasons from 2000 to 2003. On October 29, 2003, he was let go by the Orioles.

During an exhibition series between players from the US and Japan, Hargrove infamously stated that future MLB All Star and Gold Glove fielder Ichiro Suzuki, whom he would later manage, would be easy to defend on grass.

=== Seattle Mariners ===
On October 20, 2004, Hargrove was hired to manage the Seattle Mariners and turn around the team after its worst season since 1983. He agreed to a three-year deal through the 2007 season.

On April 13, 2005, he won his 1,000th game as manager, leading the Mariners to a win over the Kansas City Royals. Despite having star Ichiro Suzuki, the Mariners lost 93 games that year and finished 4th. The next year saw marginal improvement but another 4th place finish. In 402 total games, Hargrove won 190 while losing 212 while becoming the second manager of an eventual nine Mariners manager carousel from 2002 to 2021 that failed to reach the postseason.

On July 1, 2007, Hargrove resigned his position as manager of the Mariners, saying in a prepared statement that his "passion has begun to fade" and it would not be "fair to myself or the team" to continue. The departure was unusual, since the Mariners had been playing quite well at the time. Hargrove became the first big league manager since at least 1900 to depart while on a winning streak of more than seven games, according to the Elias Sports Bureau. Sources indicated that differences between Hargrove and Mariners superstar Ichiro Suzuki were the actual reason for the departure. Despite officially having resigned, Hargrove was paid for the remainder of his contract, and Ichiro signed a contract extension only weeks after Hargrove left. Hargrove flatly stated that it was not a rift with Ichiro that caused him to leave, saying that it was his loss of passion for the position of manager that made him resign. He attempted to apply for the Indians job in 2009, but he did not get an interview.

Hargrove holds a career major league managerial record of 1,188–1,173.

== Post managing career ==
From 2007 to 2009, Hargrove managed the Liberal BeeJays, a summer collegiate wood-bat team in southwest Kansas, whom he'd previously played for in 1972 while on the roster of Northwestern Oklahoma State University.

After taking the 2010 season off, Hargrove returned to Major League Baseball with the Indians in 2011 as a special advisor. His duties consist of assisting the coaching staff during spring training, and working in the front office during the regular season. He also worked a few games as a color analyst during select Indians television games during the 2011 campaign.

== Managerial record ==
Team	Year	Regular season					Postseason			
Team	Year	Games	Won	Lost	Win %	Finish	Won	Lost	Win %	Result
CLE	1991	85	32	53	.376	7th in AL East	–	–	–	–
CLE	1992	162	76	86	.469	5th in AL East	–	–	–	–
CLE	1993	162	76	86	.469	6th in AL East	–	–	–	–
CLE	1994	113	66	47	.584	2nd in AL Central	–	–	–	–
CLE	1995	144	100	44	.694	1st in AL Central	9	6	.600	Lost World Series (ATL)
CLE	1996	161	99	62	.615	1st in AL Central	1	3	.250	Lost ALDS (BAL)
CLE	1997	161	86	75	.534	1st in AL Central	10	8	.556	Lost World Series (FLA)
CLE	1998	162	89	73	.549	1st in AL Central	5	5	.500	Lost ALCS (NYY)
CLE	1999	162	97	65	.599	1st in AL Central	2	3	.400	Lost ALDS (BOS)
CLE total		1312	721	591	.550		27	25	.519	
BAL	2000	162	74	88	.457	4th in AL East	–	–	–	–
BAL	2001	161	63	98	.391	4th in AL East	–	–	–	–
BAL	2002	162	67	95	.414	4th in AL East	–	–	–	–
BAL	2003	162	71	91	.438	4th in AL East	–	–	–	–
BAL total		649	275	372	.425		0	0	–	
SEA	2005	162	69	93	.426	4th in AL West	–	–	–	–
SEA	2006	162	78	84	.481	4th in AL West	–	–	–	–
SEA	2007	78	45	33	.577	resigned	–	–	–	–
SEA total		402	190	212	.473		0	0	–	
Total		2361	1188	1173	.503		27	25	.519	

== See also ==
- List of Major League Baseball managerial wins and winning percentage leaders

Sporting positions
Preceded by first manager	Kinston Indians Manager; 1987	Succeeded by Glenn Adams
Preceded by Steve Swisher	Williamsport Bills Manager; 1988	Succeeded by Jay Ward
Preceded by Steve Swisher	Colorado Springs Sky Sox Manager; 1989	Succeeded by Bob Molinaro
