= Rick Bauer =

American baseball player (born 1977)

- Pitcher
- Born: January 10, 1977 (age 49); Garden Grove, California, U.S.
- Batted: Right Threw: Right

Professional debut
- MLB: September 2, 2001, for the Baltimore Orioles
- KBO: May 21, 2009, for the LG Twins

Last appearance
- MLB: June 29, 2008, for the Cleveland Indians
- KBO: July 5, 2009, for the LG Twins

MLB statistics
- Win–loss record: 11–14
- Earned run average: 4.51
- Strikeouts: 185

KBO statistics
- Win–loss record: 2–2
- Earned run average: 7.90
- Strikeouts: 15
- Stats at Baseball Reference

Teams
- Baltimore Orioles (2001–2005); Texas Rangers (2006); Cleveland Indians (2008); LG Twins (2009)

Richard Edward Bauer (born January 10, 1977) is an American former professional baseball pitcher. He played for the Baltimore Orioles, Texas Rangers, and Cleveland Indians of Major League Baseball (MLB). He also played for the LG Twins of the KBO League.

== Early life ==
Bauer is a 1995 graduate of Centennial High School in Boise, Idaho, and played two seasons for Treasure Valley Community College in Ontario, Oregon.

== Professional career ==
Bauer was selected by the Baltimore Orioles in the fifth round (165th overall) of the 1997 Major League Baseball draft. He was a starting pitcher in the Orioles minor league system from 1997 through 2001, compiling a 41–39 record in 119 games (114 starts) with a 4.39 ERA in 666 2/3 innings pitched.

Bauer made his major league debut in a start against the Seattle Mariners on September 2, 2001, a 1–0 loss in which he surrendered just one run on three hits and two walks in 6 1/3 innings. He pitched primarily in relief for Baltimore from 2001 through 2005, appearing in 125 games (nine starts) and compiling an 8–13 record with a 4.58 ERA in 240 innings pitched.

Bauer was released by the Orioles after the 2005 season and signed a minor league contract with the Texas Rangers on November 9, 2005. He was called up to the Rangers on April 7, 2006, and remained with the team throughout the 2006 season. In 57 appearances (one start), Bauer pitched 71 innings and posted a 3–1 record with two saves and a career-best 3.55 ERA. He was not available to pitch the final week of the season because of tendinitis in his pitching shoulder.

On January 16, 2007, the Rangers avoided salary arbitration with Bauer when they signed him to a one-year, $730,000 contract. But after a poor spring training, he was designated for assignment on March 26. He was waived by the club two days later. Bauer signed a minor league deal with the Philadelphia Phillies on April 6, 2007, but was released by their International League affiliate, the Ottawa Lynx, on June 20. He signed another minor league contract with the Los Angeles Dodgers on July 1, and spent the remainder of the season playing for their Pacific Coast League affiliate, the Las Vegas 51s.

Bauer signed a minor league contract with an invitation to spring training with the Cleveland Indians on November 30, 2007. On July 4, 2008, Bauer was designated for assignment by the Indians; he refused a minor league assignment and was released on July 10. On July 11, 2008, Bauer signed a minor league contract with the Toronto Blue Jays and became a free agent at the end of the season. In November 2008, he re-signed with the Blue Jays. However, he was released at the end of spring training on March 27.

=== Later years ===
Bauer had signed with the York Revolution in the Atlantic League for the 2009 season, but on May 13, 2009, he signed with the LG Twins in South Korea. He was released from the Twins with an injury on July 22, 2009.

On March 10, 2010, Bauer signed a minor league contract with the Colorado Rockies. On April 12, 2010, Bauer signed a contract with the Long Island Ducks of the Atlantic League. He was later released, and on July 14, signed a contract with the Lancaster Barnstormers of the Atlantic League.

On February 21, 2012, Bauer signed a minor league contract with the Los Angeles Dodgers, but he was released during spring training.
