= Sean Douglass =

American baseball player (born 1979)

- Pitcher
- Born: April 28, 1979 (age 45); Lancaster, California, U.S.
- Batted: Right Threw: Right

Professional debut
- MLB: July 18, 2001, for the Baltimore Orioles
- NPB: April 2, 2006, for the Hiroshima Toyo Carp

Last appearance
- MLB: September 28, 2005, for the Detroit Tigers
- NPB: September 27, 2008, for the Tokyo Yakult Swallows

MLB statistics
- Win–loss record: 7–13
- Earned run average: 6.11
- Strikeouts: 155

NPB statistics
- Win–loss record: 11–8
- Earned run average: 3.54
- Strikeouts: 87
- Stats at Baseball Reference

Teams
- Baltimore Orioles (2001–2003); Toronto Blue Jays (2004); Detroit Tigers (2005); Hiroshima Toyo Carp (2006–2007); Tokyo Yakult Swallows (2008)

Sean Reed Douglass (born April 28, 1979) is a former right-handed pitcher in Major League Baseball (MLB).

== Major league career ==
In 54 career games (31 starts), Douglass had a record of 7–13, his best year being 2005 going 5–5 in 18 games (16 starts) for the Tigers. He has also spent time with the Toronto Blue Jays and Baltimore Orioles. In April 2008, Douglass signed with the Florida Marlins, but did not appear in a game for their organization before being released in May.

== Japanese career ==
In 2006, Douglass played in Japan's NPB for the Hiroshima Toyo Carp. Douglass started 18 games recording a 9–6 record with a 3.41 ERA and 71 strikeouts.

In 2008 July, Douglass joined NPB for the Tokyo Yakult Swallows.
