= John Parrish (baseball) =

American baseball player (born 1977)

- Pitcher
- Born: November 26, 1977 (age 48); Lancaster, Pennsylvania, U.S.
- Batted: Left Threw: Left

MLB debut
- July 24, 2000, for the Baltimore Orioles

Last MLB appearance
- April 24, 2010, for the Kansas City Royals

MLB statistics
- Win–loss record: 14–14
- Earned run average: 4.51
- Strikeouts: 225
- Stats at Baseball Reference

Teams
- Baltimore Orioles (2000–2001, 2003–2005, 2007); Seattle Mariners (2007); Toronto Blue Jays (2008); Kansas City Royals (2010)

John Henry Parrish (born November 26, 1977) is an American former professional baseball relief pitcher. He played in Major League Baseball (MLB) for the Baltimore Orioles, Seattle Mariners, Toronto Blue Jays, and Kansas City Royals.

== Early life ==
Parrish attended McCaskey High School in Lancaster, Pennsylvania, and was a letterman in baseball, wrestling, and football. In baseball, he was an All-League selection as a pitcher/outfielder.

== Professional career ==
Parrish was drafted by the Baltimore Orioles in the 26th round of the 1996 Major League Baseball draft and made his major league debut for them on July 24, 2000 against the New York Yankees. He pitched seven innings and set a team record for most strike outs in a debut with nine. He missed the entire 2002 season with a knee injury and 2006 season recovering from Tommy John surgery. On August 9, 2007, he was traded to the Seattle Mariners for minor leaguer Sebastien Boucher and a player to be named later. He became a free agent at the end of the season. On January 2, 2008, he signed with the Toronto Blue Jays. In 17 games with Triple-A Syracuse, he went 10-1 with a 2.97 ERA and 100 strikeouts. On February 4, 2009, he signed a minor league contract with his original team, the Orioles, only to be released by the organization in April.

On January 4, 2010, Parrish signed a minor league contract with the Kansas City Royals with an invite to spring training.

On June 16, 2010, Parrish was released by the Royals.
