= José León (baseball) =

Puerto Rican baseball player (born 1976)

- Third baseman / First baseman
- Born: December 8, 1976 (age 49); Cayey, Puerto Rico
- Batted: Right Threw: Right

MLB debut
- June 16, 2002, for the Baltimore Orioles

Last MLB appearance
- September 26, 2004, for the Baltimore Orioles

MLB statistics
- Batting average: .225
- Home runs: 5
- Runs batted in: 18

CPBL statistics
- Batting average: .315
- Home runs: 7
- Runs batted in: 24
- Stats at Baseball Reference

Teams
- Baltimore Orioles (2002–2004); Macoto Cobras / dmedia T-REX (2007–2008)

José Geraldo León Vega (born December 8, 1976) is a Puerto Rican former professional baseball third baseman and first baseman. He played in Major League Baseball for the Baltimore Orioles from 2002–2004 and has also played professionally in Puerto Rico, Mexico, Taiwan, and Venezuela.

León was born in Cayey, Puerto Rico. He was once a highly regarded power-hitting prospect, but he never lived up to his early potential. He was selected for the World team in the 2000 All-Star Futures Game. León made the Mexican League All-Star team in 2006 batting .348 with 17 home runs and 49 RBI. He made the All-Star team again in 2007 batting .300 with 14 home runs and 46 RBI. In 2008, he played in only 28 games batting .279.

In 2018, León returned to the Cardinals organization as the hitting coach for the Dominican Summer League Cardinals, a rookie league affiliate based in the Dominican Republic. León was the 2019 manager of the State College Spikes, the Class A Short Season affiliate of the St. Louis Cardinals in the New York–Penn League. He was to return to that position for the 2020 season. In 2021, León managed the Palm Beach Cardinals, the Cardinals' Low-A affiliate and did not return the following season. As of 2024, León is the hitting coach of the Reds' Single-A affiliate, the Daytona Tortugas.
