= Mike Kinkade =

American baseball player (born 1973)

- Utility player / Coach
- Born: May 6, 1973 (age 53); Livonia, Michigan, U.S.
- Batted: Right Threw: Right

Professional debut
- MLB: September 8, 1998, for the New York Mets
- NPB: April 2, 2004, for the Hanshin Tigers

Last appearance
- MLB: September 28, 2003, for the Los Angeles Dodgers
- NPB: August 11, 2004, for the Hanshin Tigers

MLB statistics
- Batting average: .256
- Home runs: 13
- Runs batted in: 48

NPB statistics
- Batting average: .233
- Home runs: 3
- Runs batted in: 7
- Stats at Baseball Reference

Teams
- New York Mets (1998–2000); Baltimore Orioles (2000–2001); Los Angeles Dodgers (2002–2003); Hanshin Tigers (2004)
Medals
Men's baseball
Representing the United States
Olympic Games
Gold medal – first place	2000 Sydney	Team competition

Michael Arthur Kinkade (born May 6, 1973) is an American college baseball coach and former Major League Baseball player. He played for the New York Mets, Baltimore Orioles, and Los Angeles Dodgers between 1998 and 2003. Later, he was an assistant coach at California State University, Bakersfield.

== Amateur career ==
After graduating from Tigard High School in Tigard, Oregon, Kinkade was a star at Washington State University, where he played college baseball for the Cougars from 1992–1995. He was a third-team All-American in 1994, and became the school's leader in career hits with 304, a mark he held until 2006. After the 1994 season, he played collegiate summer baseball with the Falmouth Commodores of the Cape Cod Baseball League and was named a league all-star.

== Professional career ==
=== Milwaukee Brewers ===
The Milwaukee Brewers drafted Kinkade in the 19th round of the 1994 draft, but he elected to return to school for his senior year. The Brewers drafted him again the next year, in the ninth round with the 236th overall pick, and this time he signed with the team.

Kinkade was an immediate success in the minor leagues, splitting time between catching and playing in the outfield. He was a Pioneer League All-Star in his first professional season in 1995, compiling a .353 batting average with 26 stolen bases and more walks than strikeouts. The next season, Kinkade was again an All-Star, this time in the Midwest League. He also set a league record for hit by pitches. He was even more productive in 1997, when he was named the Most Valuable Player of the Double-A Texas League. He batted .385 with a .455 on-base percentage, a .588 slugging percentage, and 17 stolen bases, though he also committed 60 errors in the field.

=== New York Mets ===
On July 31, 1998, the Brewers traded Kinkade to the New York Mets for left-handed pitcher Bill Pulsipher. Along with fellow pitching prospects Jason Isringhausen and Paul Wilson, Pulsipher had been promoted by the Mets as a part of "Generation K", a trio of starting pitchers who were supposed to carry the team's rotation for the next decade. Isringhausen and Wilson sustained arm injuries, while Pulsipher encountered control problems, and none enjoyed any substantial success with the Mets.

After the trade, Kinkade struggled with the Mets' Triple-A affiliate at Norfolk. He made his major league debut on September 8, 1998, in a 16–4 loss to the Philadelphia Phillies, but struggled to establish himself in the majors. Kinkade appeared in 31 games with the Mets in 1998 and 1999 but was sent all the way down to the class AA Binghamton Mets for the 2000 season, the same level where he was an MVP three years early.

Kinkade's season in Binghamton marked a resurgence in his career. He was named to the Eastern League All-Star team, and on July 28, was traded to the Baltimore Orioles, giving him a fresh start with a new franchise. The Mets sent Kinkade, Melvin Mora, Lesli Brea, and prospect Pat Gorman to the Orioles for All-Star shortstop Mike Bordick for a playoff run. Bordick helped the Mets reach the World Series that year, but the deal proved costly: Bordick returned to the Orioles as a free agent that off-season, and Mora developed into a star.

=== Olympics ===
Kinkade appeared in three games with the Orioles at the end of 2000, then left for Sydney to represent the United States at the Summer Olympics. America's baseball team won the gold medal, and Kinkade played a key role, getting on base in the seventh inning of a semifinal game against South Korea and scoring America's second run in a come-from-behind 3–2 win.

=== Baltimore Orioles and Los Angeles Dodgers ===
Kinkade experienced his first real major league success in 2001, batting .275 with a .345 OBP in 160 at bats with the Orioles. He signed with the Los Angeles Dodgers as a free agent that off-season, then enjoyed tremendous success as a bench player, batting .380 with seven extra-base hits in only 50 at bats. Kinkade was less successful in a return engagement with the Los Angeles Dodgers in 2003, though he did finish fifth in the National League with 16 hit-by-pitches.

=== Japan and minor leagues ===
He played in Japan with the Hanshin Tigers in 2004, then spent 2005 in the Cleveland Indians organization with the Buffalo Bisons, 2006 in the Florida Marlins organization with the Albuquerque Isotopes.He spent 2007 in the Chicago Cubs organization with the Iowa Cubs and as a third baseman for the Trenton Thunder, the New York Yankees Double-A affiliate. On February 23, 2008, he signed a minor league contract with the Seattle Mariners.
