= Ryan Kohlmeier =

American baseball player (born 1977)

- Pitcher
- Born: June 25, 1977 (age 49); Salina, Kansas, U.S.
- Batted: Right Threw: Right

MLB debut
- July 29, 2000, for the Baltimore Orioles

Last MLB appearance
- October 5, 2001, for the Baltimore Orioles

MLB statistics
- Win–loss record: 1–3
- Earned run average: 4.47
- Strikeouts: 46
- Stats at Baseball Reference

Teams
- Baltimore Orioles (2000–2001)

Ryan Lyle Kohlmeier (born June 25, 1977) is an American former Major League Baseball pitcher who played for the Baltimore Orioles in 2000 and 2001.

== Career ==
He was originally drafted by the Colorado Rockies in the 34th round of the 1995 amateur draft, but did not sign. Kohlmeier was then drafted by the Orioles in the 14th round of the 1996 amateur draft and signed with the team on August 16. He was claimed off waivers by the Chicago White Sox on November 19, 2001. He played in the White Sox' minor league system from 2002 to 2004 and announced his retirement from baseball on August 12, 2004.

== Personal life ==
Kohlmeier graduated from Emporia State University with degrees in biochemistry and molecular biology and the University of Missouri–Kansas City School of Dentistry. As of June 2021, Kohlmeier is a dentist in Emporia, Kansas with a wife and three children.
