= Buddy Groom =

American baseball player (born 1965)

- Pitcher
- Born: July 10, 1965 (age 61); Dallas, Texas, U.S.
- Batted: Left Threw: Left

MLB debut
- June 20, 1992, for the Detroit Tigers

Last MLB appearance
- September 24, 2005, for the Arizona Diamondbacks

MLB statistics
- Win–loss record: 31–32
- Earned run average: 4.64
- Strikeouts: 494
- Stats at Baseball Reference

Teams
- Detroit Tigers (1992–1995); Florida Marlins (1995); Oakland Athletics (1996–1999); Baltimore Orioles (2000–2004); New York Yankees (2005); Arizona Diamondbacks (2005)

Wedsel Gary "Buddy" Groom Jr. (born July 10, 1965) is an American former Major League Baseball left-handed middle relief pitcher. He attended the University of Mary Hardin-Baylor and was drafted by the Chicago White Sox in the 1987 amateur draft.

He played in the minor leagues, and he eventually signed with the Detroit Tigers in 1990. He moved up through the minors and broke into the majors as a spot starter for the Tigers in 1992. He lost all of his 5 decisions, and he did not win a decision until 1995, his first year as a bonafide reliever.

In 1995, he was traded to the Florida Marlins for Mike Myers, where he finished the year. The next year, he signed with the Oakland Athletics, where he played until 1999. He signed with the Baltimore Orioles and played there through the 2004 season. In 2005, he signed with the New York Yankees. On July 30, 2005, Groom was designated for assignment. During his exit from the Yankees, the New York Post reported that Groom said that he wasn't one of "Joe's boys", and claimed he was used as a "mop up guy". Groom was referring to Yankees manager Joe Torre. On July 31, Groom was traded to the Arizona Diamondbacks. After the 2005 season, Groom became a free agent.

Groom had a career 31–32 record, a 4.64 ERA, and 27 career saves. He started 15 games and recorded 494 strikeouts. He led the league in appearances in 1999 with 76, and is 35th on the all-time list of appearances with 786. He holds the major league record for most games pitched without recording a plate appearance.

== See also ==
- List of people with surname Groom
