= Chris Richard (baseball) =

American baseball player (born 1974)

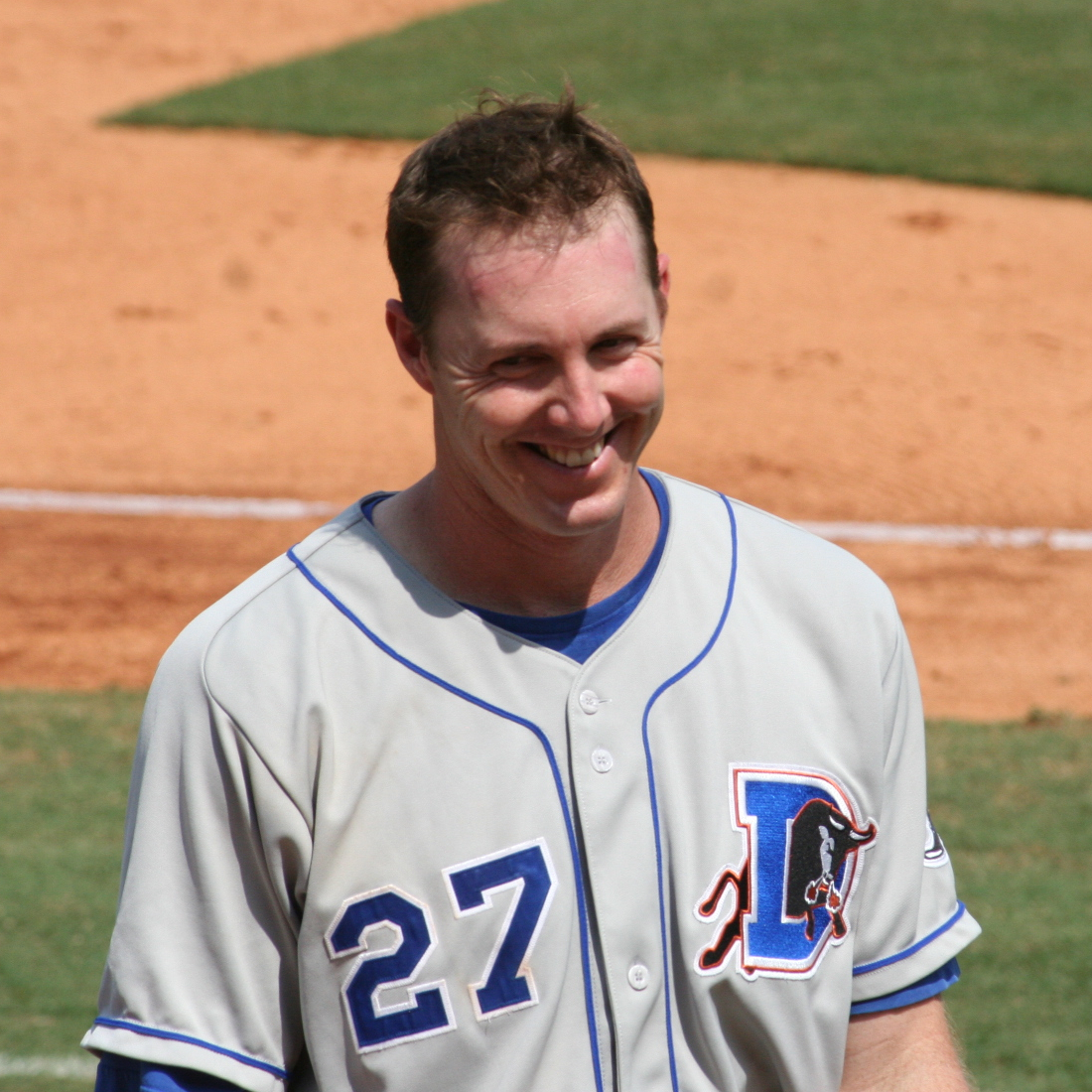
- Richard with the Durham Bulls in 2010
- Outfielder / First baseman
- Born: June 7, 1974 (age 52); San Diego, California, U.S.
- Batted: Left Threw: Left

MLB debut
- July 17, 2000, for the St. Louis Cardinals

Last MLB appearance
- October 4, 2009, for the Tampa Bay Rays

MLB statistics
- Batting average: .255
- Home runs: 34
- Runs batted in: 122
- Stats at Baseball Reference

Teams
- St. Louis Cardinals (2000); Baltimore Orioles (2000–2002); Colorado Rockies (2003); Tampa Bay Rays (2009)

Christopher Robert Richard (born June 7, 1974) is an American former Major League Baseball outfielder and first baseman. He is an alumnus of University of San Diego High School in San Diego and of Oklahoma State University. He last played in the majors in 2009 for the Tampa Bay Rays.

== Career ==
Drafted by the St. Louis Cardinals in the 19th round of the 1995 MLB draft, Richard made his Major League Baseball debut with the Cardinals on July 17, 2000. He hit a home run in his first major league at-bat, becoming the fourth player in the history of the club to do so. After appearing in six games with the Cardinals, Richard was traded to the Baltimore Orioles on July 29, 2000, for pitcher Mike Timlin.

With Baltimore, Richard's 2001 campaign would be the best of his career. In 136 games for the Orioles, he compiled a .265 batting average with 15 home runs and 65 RBI.

After appearing in 50 games for Baltimore in 2002, Richard was traded to the Colorado Rockies on March 21, 2003, for outfielder Jack Cust.

Initially a first baseman, Richard was converted to an outfielder with Jeff Conine being the Orioles' mainstay at first base, and later Todd Helton being the Rockies starter at first.

After being out of organized baseball in 2004, Richard played for the Oklahoma RedHawks in the Texas Rangers organization in 2005. After spending the 2006 season playing for the Indianapolis Indians, the Triple-A affiliate of the Pittsburgh Pirates, he played 2007 and 2008 with the Durham Bulls, the Triple-A affiliate of the Tampa Bay Rays.

Richard returned to Durham to start the 2009 season. He was called up by the Rays on September 7, 2009, after Carlos Peña suffered two broken fingers on a CC Sabathia pitch, and had one plate appearance in the second game of a day/night doubleheader against the New York Yankees.

Richard was released and became a minor league free agent in 2009.

He played for the Durham Bulls once again in 2010.

Richard retired on March 4, 2011.

Richard lives in his hometown of San Diego, CA with his wife and daughter, where he co-owns and operates his family business, Personal Pitcher.
