= Luis Matos (baseball, born 1978) =

Puerto Rican baseball player (born 1978)

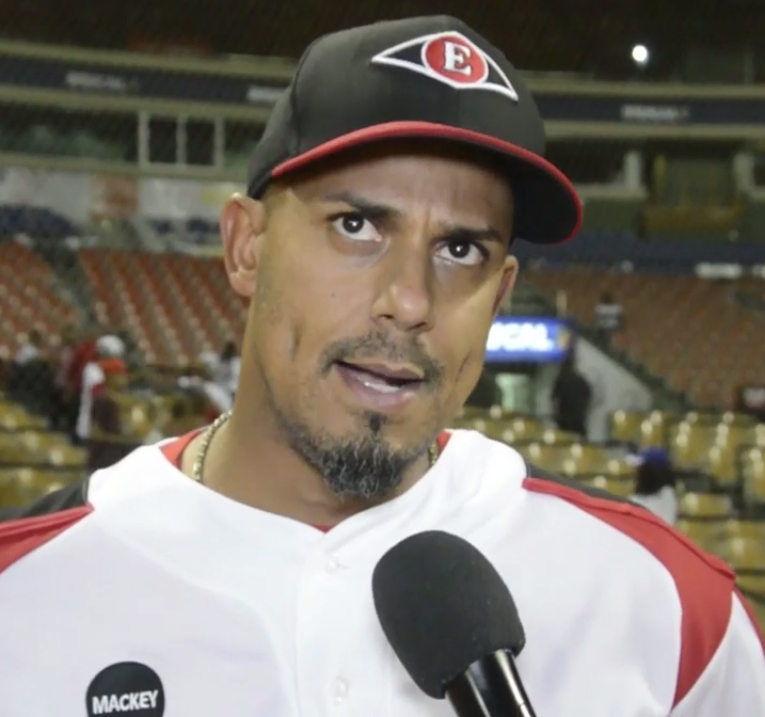
- Matos with Leones del Escogido in 2020
- Outfielder / Manager
- Born: October 30, 1978 (age 48); Bayamón, Puerto Rico
- Batted: Right Threw: Right

MLB debut
- June 19, 2000, for the Baltimore Orioles

Last MLB appearance
- August 9, 2006, for the Washington Nationals

MLB statistics
- Batting average: .255
- Home runs: 30
- Runs batted in: 140
- Stats at Baseball Reference

Teams
- Baltimore Orioles (2000–2006); Washington Nationals (2006)

Luis David Matos (born October 30, 1978) is a Puerto Rican former professional baseball outfielder. He played in Major League Baseball for the Baltimore Orioles between 2000 and 2006 and briefly for the Washington Nationals in late 2006. He most recently played for the Piratas de Campeche in the Mexican League. He bats and throws right-handed.

== Career as a player ==
Matos was considered to be injury prone, as he has had only 3 seasons with over 300 at bats and one with 400 or more. Some in the Orioles organization felt he never reached his potential except for 2003 when he had 13 home runs, 15 stolen bases and had a batting average of .303. Matos is considered to be a good center fielder, but has an average arm. After losing his position as starting center fielder with the Orioles to Corey Patterson, Matos was designated for assignment on July 6, 2006. He signed with the Nationals as a free agent on July 14, 2006. On August 11, 2006, he was unconditionally released by the Nationals. On January 23, 2007, he signed with the Pittsburgh Pirates, but was released on March 30, 2007. Matos then signed a minor league contract with the New York Mets on August 20, 2007. In 14 games with the Mets Triple-A affiliate, the New Orleans Zephyrs, he batted .204 with 1 home run and 4 RBI.

In 2008, Matos played in the Mexican League for the Leones de Yucatán. In 88 games, he hit .289 with 6 home runs, 44 RBI, and 22 stolen bases. In December 2008, he signed a minor league contract with the Minnesota Twins, but returned to Yucatán without playing for them. He joined Campeche for the 2011 season.

== Career as a manager ==
In 2015, he was hired as an assistant coach for the Great Lakes Loons of the Midwest League but was promoted to manager when the original manager left to fill a vacancy with the Dodgers California League team. The following season, he became a coach for the AAA Oklahoma City Dodgers of the Pacific Coast League.

In 2016, he debuted as manager in the Liga de Béisbol Profesional Roberto Clemente, the main professional baseball league in Puerto Rico, with the Criollos de Caguas. In January 2017, he won the league championship with the Criollos by defeating the Cangrejeros de Santurce. In February 2017, he managed the Criollos to a championship in the Caribbean Series when they defeated Mexico 1–0 in 10 innings. It was the first Caribbean Series title for Puerto Rico since 2000. By winning his second consecutive Caribbean Series in as many tries in 2018, Matos tied the record of consecutive titles held solely by Nap Reyes of Tigres de Marianao for six decades.

In July 2021, Matos was appointed manager of the Mexican League team Leones de Yucatán. He led the team to LMB Championship Series, where they fell to the Toros de Tijuana in 7 games. Matos returned for the beginning of the 2022 season, but was later dismissed following a 14–19 start.
