= Mike Bordick =

American baseball player (born 1965)

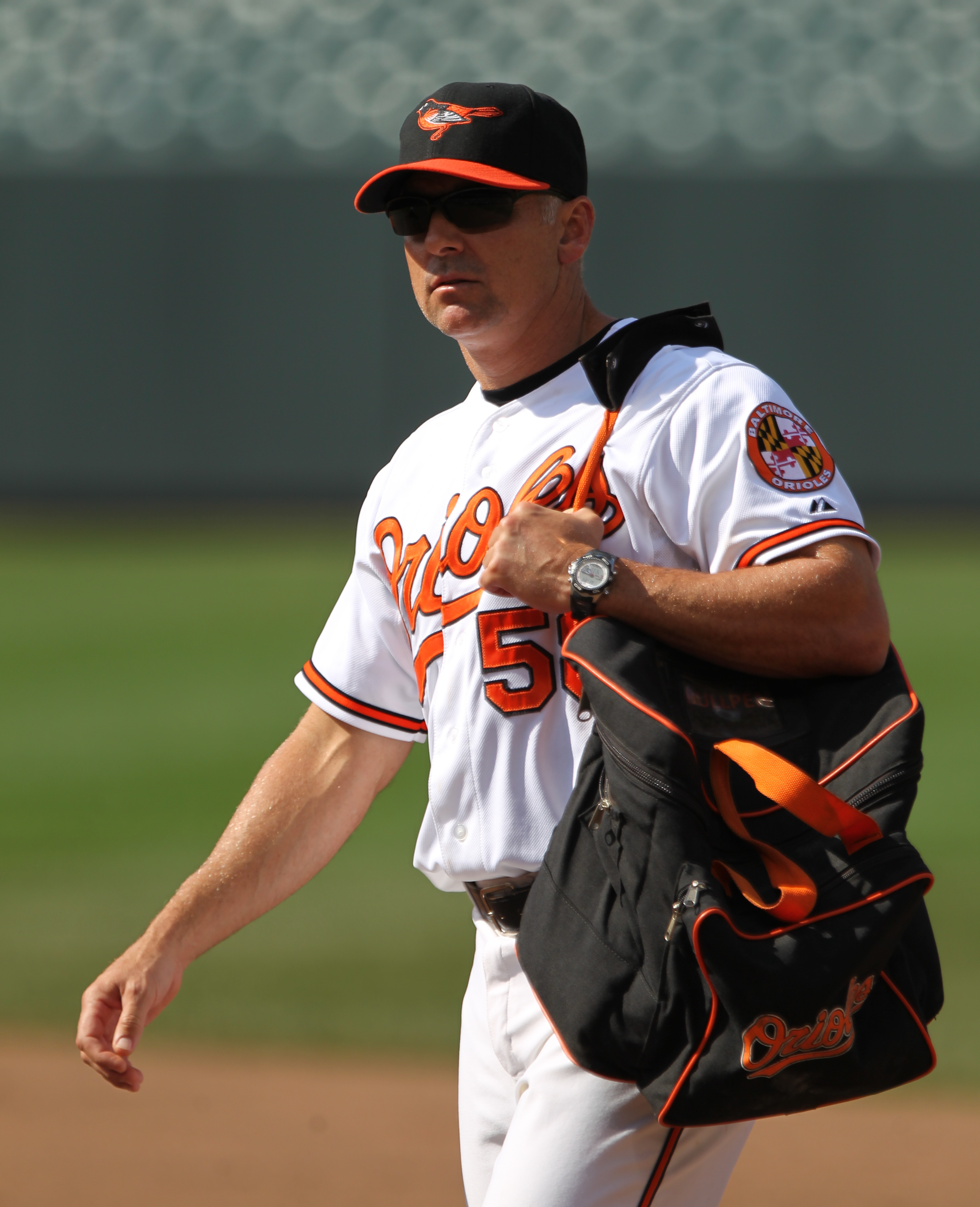
- Bordick in 2011
- Shortstop
- Born: July 21, 1965 (age 61); Marquette, Michigan, U.S.
- Batted: Right Threw: Right

MLB debut
- April 11, 1990, for the Oakland Athletics

Last MLB appearance
- September 28, 2003, for the Toronto Blue Jays

MLB statistics
- Batting average: .260
- Home runs: 91
- Runs batted in: 626
- Stats at Baseball Reference

Teams
- Oakland Athletics (1990–1996); Baltimore Orioles (1997–2000); New York Mets (2000); Baltimore Orioles (2001–2002); Toronto Blue Jays (2003)

Career highlights and awards
- All-Star (2000); Baltimore Orioles Hall of Fame

Michael Todd Bordick (born July 21, 1965) is an American former professional baseball shortstop. He played in Major League Baseball from 1990 to 2003 with four teams: the Oakland Athletics, Baltimore Orioles, New York Mets, and Toronto Blue Jays.

== Early life ==
Bordick's father, Michael, was in the Air Force, and his family moved frequently. Mike Bordick was born in Michigan and spent parts of his early childhood in Maine and in upstate New York before the family settled in Winterport, Maine, while he was in high school. He attended high school at Hampden Academy in Hampden, Maine along with longtime NASCAR veteran Ricky Craven. Bordick starred for the Hampden Academy Broncos and now the High School field is named in his honor.

== Amateur career ==
Bordick attended the University of Maine, where he played college baseball for the Black Bears. In 1986, he played collegiate summer baseball in the Cape Cod Baseball League for the Yarmouth-Dennis Red Sox, and was signed by the Oakland Athletics and J.P. Ricciardi as an amateur free agent on July 10, 1986.

== Professional career ==
Bordick made his Major League Baseball debut on April 11, 1990, with the Athletics. In 1992, he would finish 21st in AL MVP voting after batting .300 (10th in the AL) and providing excellent defense to the division winning Athletics. He signed with the Baltimore Orioles during the 1996 off season. The Orioles signed Bordick to take over at shortstop for Hall of Fame and Gold Glove shortstop Cal Ripken Jr., as Ripken moved to third base. He was selected to the 2000 All-Star Game.

After an injury to the Mets' Rey Ordóñez, on July 28, 2000, Bordick was traded to the New York Mets for Melvin Mora, and minor leaguers Mike Kinkade, Pat Gorman and Lesli Brea. Bordick was a member of the 1997 Orioles team that lost in the American League Championship Series to the Cleveland Indians, and the New York Mets that lost the Subway Series to the New York Yankees in the 2000 World Series. Bordick also played briefly in the 1990 World Series against the Cincinnati Reds in a defensive role only.

Renowned for his defensive prowess, Bordick set MLB records for most consecutive error-less games (110) and chances (543) by a shortstop. He would lead the AL in SS fielding percentage twice (1999 and 2002) with six other seasons in the top-5. His 2002 season featured only one error in 1007 innings. Bordick currently stands 6th all-time in SS fielding percentage (.982).

== Coaching and broadcasting career ==
Following the end of his playing career, Bordick worked as a roving minor league instructor for the Blue Jays. In 2010, he rejoined the Orioles organization as the minor league offensive coordinator, and in 2011, he was the Orioles' temporary bullpen coach for several series. From 2012 to 2020 he served as a part-time color analyst for Orioles telecasts on MASN, alternating games with Jim Palmer. On January 26, 2021, Bordick was let go by MASN.
