= Gerónimo Gil =

Mexican baseball player (born 1975)

- Catcher / Manager / Coach
- Born: August 7, 1975 (age 50); Oaxaca, Mexico
- Batted: Right Threw: Right

MLB debut
- September 8, 2001, for the Baltimore Orioles

Last MLB appearance
- August 22, 2007, for the Colorado Rockies

MLB statistics
- Batting average: .230
- Home runs: 19
- Runs batted in: 88
- Stats at Baseball Reference

Teams
- Baltimore Orioles (2001–2005); Colorado Rockies (2007)
Medals
Men's baseball
Representing Mexico
Pan American Games
| Bronze medal – third place | 2007 Rio de Janeiro | Team |
Central American and Caribbean Games
| Bronze medal – third place | 2006 Cartagena | Team |

Gerónimo Gil (Spanish pronunciation: [xeˈɾonimo ˈxil]; born August 7, 1975) is a Mexican former professional baseball catcher and coach who most recently served as the manager for the Dorados de Chihuahua of the Mexican League. He played in Major League Baseball (MLB) from 2001 to 2007 for the Baltimore Orioles and Colorado Rockies. He batted and threw right-handed.

== Playing career ==
Gil began his baseball career with the Red Devils of the Mexican League. He had played in only four games for Mexico City in 1995 when his contract was purchased by the Los Angeles Dodgers on Feb. 15, 1996.

=== Los Angeles Dodgers ===
Gil played for the Single–A Savannah Sand Gnats in 1996. The Sand Gnats came back from seventh place and won the South Atlantic League championship that year.

In 1997, Gil played for the Single-A Vero Beach Dodgers. The next year, he was promoted to the Double-A San Antonio Missions, playing catcher as well as in the outfield and at first base. Gil played for San Antonio until 2000. The highlights of his career with San Antonio included ranking 4th in batting average and tying for third place in doubles with 17 in 1998, tying for the Missions' team lead with 15 home runs in 1999, and being named the best defensive catcher in the Texas League in 2000. In 1999, he played catcher and outfield, and in 2000, he caught and also played third base.

Later in the 2000 season, Gil was promoted to the Triple-A Albuquerque Dukes. With the Dukes, he played 15 games, batting .380 with two home runs and 22 runs batted in. He also had a .600 slugging average and a .421 on-base percentage.

Despite the fact that he played nearly his entire minor league career on Los Angeles farm teams, Gil never played a Major League game for the Dodgers. He began the 2001 season in the Dodgers farm system with the Triple-A Las Vegas 51s, but was traded to the Baltimore Orioles on July 31, 2001, after batting only .222 with Las Vegas.

=== Baltimore Orioles ===
After the trade, Gil played for the Triple-A Rochester Red Wings. He batted .313, collecting a hit in 13 of his last 17 games with Rochester. He also had only eight stolen bases against him in 31 attempts. The highlight of his short stint with Rochester was an eight-game hitting streak, from Aug. 7–15. On September 7, the Orioles purchased Gil's contract from the Red Wings. He made his major league debut the next day. Of the final 22 games of the season, Gil started at catcher in 17 of them.

In 2002, Gil started for the O's on Opening Day. He was the first Orioles rookie to start at catcher on Opening Day since Andy Etchebarren, in 1966. He caught 33 out of 91 baserunners stealing, second in the American League to Bengie Molina. He hit his first big league homer on April 11, off Tampa Bay Devil Rays pitcher Travis Phelps. His first multi-homer game was on April 23, both off the Boston Red Sox pitcher Frank Castillo. He also hit another home run off Castillo on April 29. Gil hit 12 home runs that year, the most ever by a Mexican-born rookie. The previous record was held by Vinny Castilla, who hit 9 for the Colorado Rockies in 1993. An interesting fact about Gil's 2002 season is that of his 12 home runs, 4 were against the Red Sox, the most he hit against any team that year. 3 of those 4 homers he hit against Boston were off Frank Castillo. He was selected as the catcher on the Topps' All-Rookie team after the season was over. Gil played for the Obregón Yaquis in the Mexican Pacific League during the 2002 off season, batting .266 with 6 home runs and 20 runs batted in. He played mostly first base, outfield and designated hitter. He also played 6 games as a catcher and a game at third.

In 2003, Gil spent most of the season with Baltimore, but he also played for six weeks with the Triple-A Ottawa Lynx. He started the season as the everyday catcher for the O's, and started 12 of the first 16 games. Gil batted only .173 with a home run and three runs batted in during the first 22 games, and with only 1 game in which he had more than one hit in that span. He batted .339 with 2 home runs and 9 runs batted in during May, and in June he batted only .139 with 2 runs batted in and no home runs. In July, he only started 2 games before being optioned to Triple-A Ottawa on July 20. With the Lynx, he hit safely in 30 out of 36 games. Gil also had an 11-game hitting streak, from August 2–13. During this hitting streak, he batted .400. While with Ottawa, he had 17 runs batted in, 13 of which he hit in the final 18 games of the minor league season. After Ottawa was eliminated by the Pawtucket Red Sox in the International League playoff series, in which Gil batted 1 for 16, Baltimore brought Gil back up from the minors. He had two hits in his first major league game back, but only played in three games. During the season, he threw out 10 of 48 base stealers. Gil played again for Obregón in the Mexican League after the season, playing 50 games and batting .277 with 4 home runs and 29 runs batted in.

Gil spent almost the whole 2004 season with Ottawa, after being sent to Ottawa during spring training, a decision he infamously reacted to by smashing trash cans in the clubhouse with his bat. He hit .287 in the first half with the Lynx, and was their only player at the Triple-A All-Star Game. In the second half, he hit .278 in the end of July, and only .198 in August. Gil was called up by the Orioles in September when rosters expanded. He played in 12 games for the O's during the last month of the season, batting .281, and was the only Orioles backup catcher that hit over .170. He had a 2-run batted in double in his first game back against the Devil Rays on September 2. Gil also had a season-high 2 hits against the Detroit Tigers on the September 26. He also threw out 3 of 16 baserunners.

In 2005, Gil batted .192, with four home runs, 17 runs batted in and no stolen bases in 64 games. The Orioles placed him on the 15-day disabled list on July 4 with a strained left thumb.

Before the 2006 season, the Orioles placed Gil on waivers, which he cleared. On March 29, 2006, Gil was released by the Orioles.

=== Colorado Rockies ===
Gil signed with the Colorado Rockies on December 14, 2006. Before the start of the season, he was loaned to the Red Devils of the Mexican League where he batted .396 in 75 games and was named to the mid-season All-Star team. He was returned and called up by the Rockies on August 9, 2007.

Gil is notable for having 820 career at-bats without a triple.

=== Return to the Mexican League ===
Gil started 2008 playing for the Guerreros de Oaxaca, but after 54 games, he was sent to the Red Devils. Combined, Gil batted .298 with 11 home runs and 51 runs batted in. After that, he played with the Diablos Rojos del México and Naranjeros de Hermosillo, and also participated in the Baseball Fest 2010 in Tijuana with Hermosillo. He played with the Diablos Rojos del México for the 2016 season.

== Coaching career ==
Gil accepted his first manager position with the Marineros de Ensenada of the Liga Norte de México in June 2018, joining the team midseason and leading them to a league title. He was hired by the Leones de Yucatán in 2019, serving as their manager until he was fired during the 2021 season.

On May 21, 2025, Gil was named as the manager for the Dorados de Chihuahua of the Mexican League, following the firing of José Valentín. On July 10, Gil was fired by Chihuahua.

== Personal life ==
He is married to Adriana Ortiz Cordova. She is from Mexico City and studied hearing and language at Normal de Especializacion University and has two children, Gerónimo and Angelo, both of them with the last names "Gil Ortiz". The family lives in Lagunas, Oaxaca, Mexico.
