= Melvin Mora =

Venezuelan baseball player (born 1972)

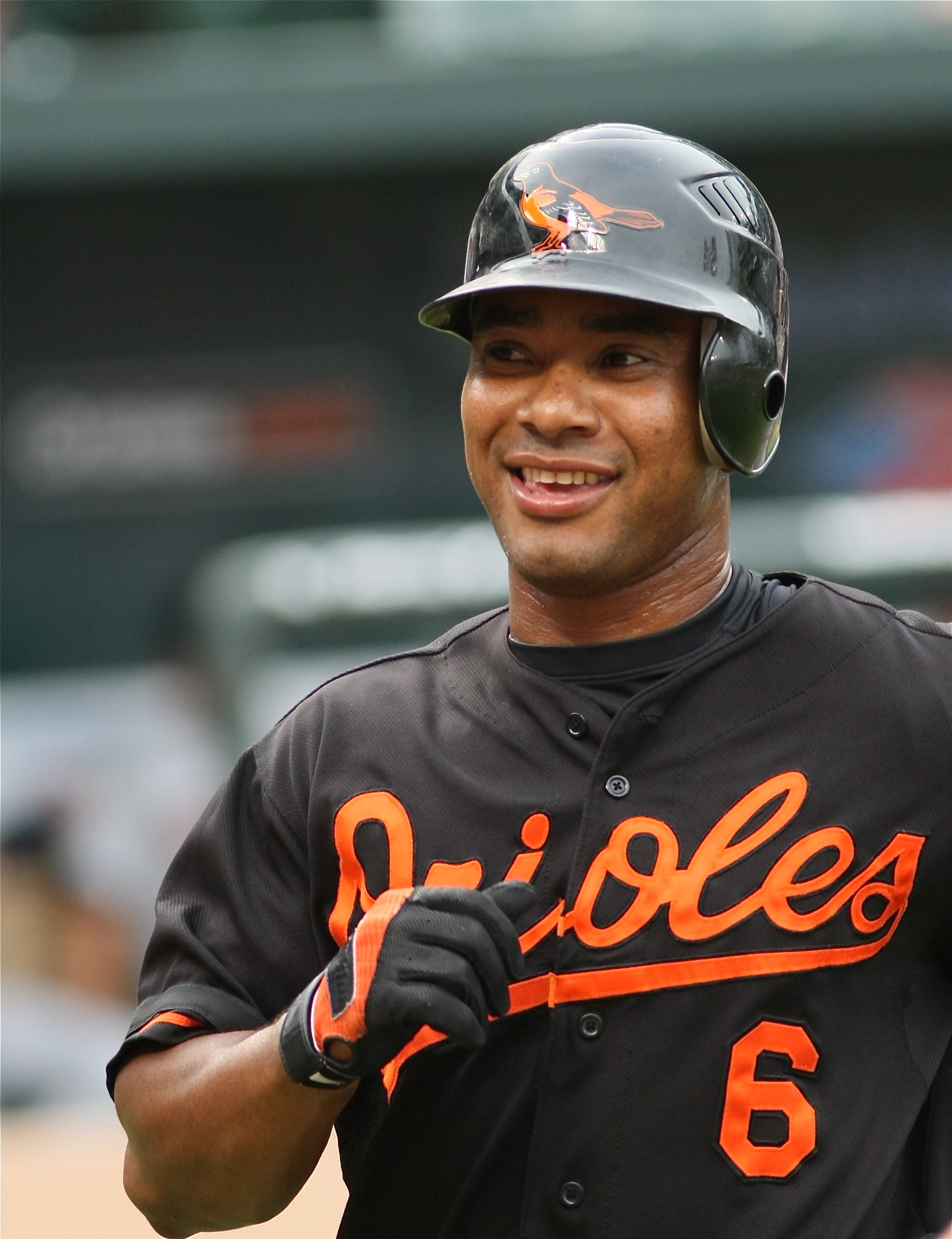
- Mora with the Baltimore Orioles in 2008

Leones de Yucatán
- Third baseman / Coach
- Born: February 2, 1972 (age 54); Yaracuy, Venezuela
- Batted: Right Threw: Right

MLB debut
- May 30, 1999, for the New York Mets

Last MLB appearance
- June 29, 2011, for the Arizona Diamondbacks

MLB statistics
- Batting average: .277
- Home runs: 171
- Runs batted in: 754
- Stats at Baseball Reference

Teams
- New York Mets (1999–2000); Baltimore Orioles (2000–2009); Colorado Rockies (2010); Arizona Diamondbacks (2011)

Career highlights and awards
- 2× All-Star (2003, 2005); Silver Slugger Award (2004); Baltimore Orioles Hall of Fame

Member of the Venezuelan

Baseball Hall of Fame
- Induction: 2022
- Vote: 75%
- Election method: Contemporary Committee

Melvin Mora Diaz (born February 2, 1972) is a Venezuelan-American former professional baseball infielder who currently serves as a hitting coach for the Leones de Yucatán of the Mexican League. He played in Major League Baseball (MLB) for the New York Mets, Baltimore Orioles, Colorado Rockies, and Arizona Diamondbacks, and in the Chinese Professional Baseball League (CPBL) for the Mercuries Tigers.

From his debut in 1999 to 2003, Mora was known as a utility player, playing all three outfield positions, shortstop, and second base. In 2004, the Orioles made Mora their everyday third baseman, a position he occupied through 2009.

== Playing career ==
=== New York Mets ===
Mora was signed out of Venezuela as an amateur free agent in 1991. After spending seven years in the Astros farm system and few months in the Chinese Professional Baseball League with the Mercuries Tigers, he signed as a free agent with the Mets in 1998 and made his major league debut in the 1999 season. Mora made himself more valuable by being able to play all three outfield positions, shortstop, second base and third.

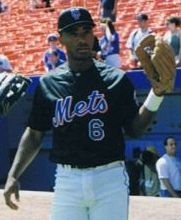
Mora with the New York Mets in 1999

In 1999, he scored the winning run of the final game of the year for the Mets on a wild pitch by the Pirates' Brad Clontz, which propelled the Mets to a one-game playoff with Cincinnati, which they won.

Mora became a cult hero in New York as he starred in the 1999 National League Championship Series, batting a clutch .429 with an OPS of 1.143, and throwing runners out at home plate and third base from his right field position.

In 2000, shortstop Rey Ordoñez broke his arm, ending Ordoñez's season. Mora was moved to shortstop, where he struggled defensively.

=== Baltimore Orioles ===
==== 2000–03 ====
The Mets traded Mora to Baltimore on July 28, 2000, with two minor league players and Mike Kinkade for veteran shortstop Mike Bordick. Used as a utility player in Baltimore, things changed in 2003, when an injury-depleted Orioles team began using Mora almost exclusively in left field, and Mora responded with the best stretch of his career. He reached base in 32 straight games while using a 23-game hitting streak to temporarily become the American League batting leader. Finally excelling as a hitter, Mora was chosen for his first All-Star selection. Mora's season was cut short due to injuries (a bruised wrist and a partially torn ligament in his left knee), but finished with a .317 batting average, 15 home runs, and a .418 on-base percentage in 96 games.

==== 2004 ====
Mora's 2003 season proved that he could be a consistent hitter at the major league level. In 2004, Mora became the Orioles' regular third baseman and enjoyed his most productive season in the majors. Mora hit a career-high .340, finishing second in the American League batting race to Ichiro Suzuki's .372 mark; led the league in on-base percentage (.419); ranked fifth in slugging average (.562) and OPS (.981); sixth in runs (111), doubles (41) and times on base (264); eighth in hits (187), and ninth in total bases (264). His 27 home runs and 104 RBI were also career-highs, while leading his team in batting average, runs, on-base percentage, slugging average and OPS. At third base, he improved and became more consistent as the season wore on. Mora finished 18th in American League MVP voting and won a Silver Slugger Award.

==== 2005–07 ====
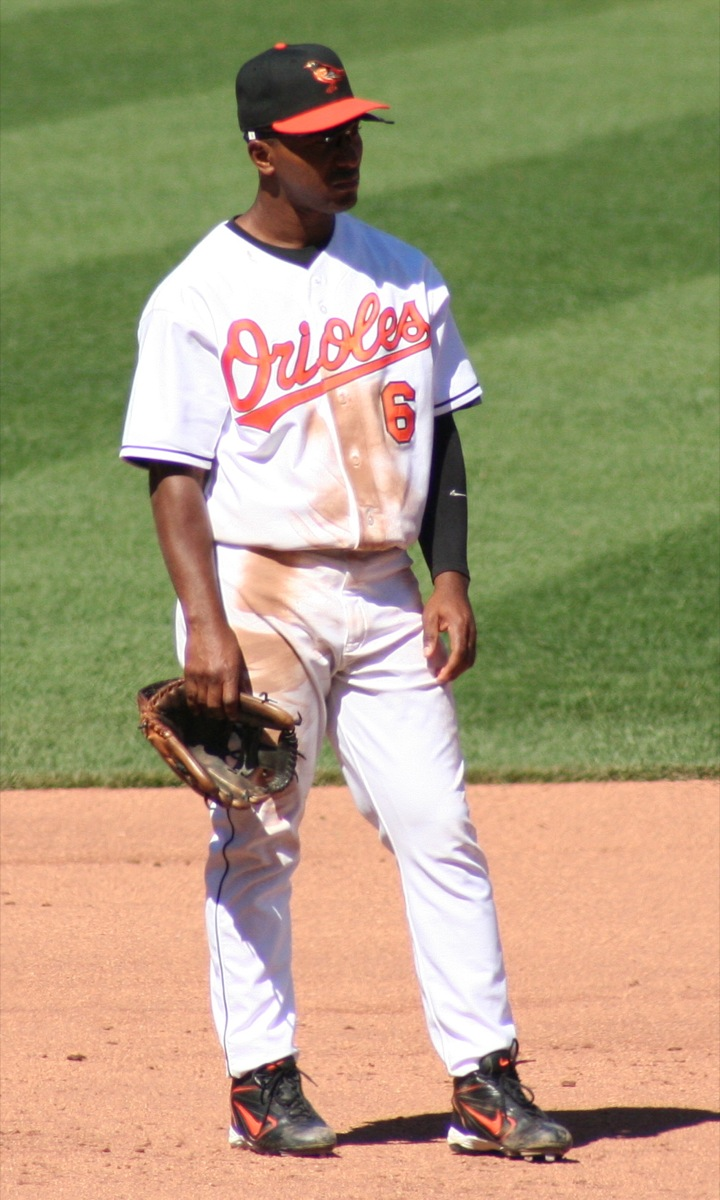
Mora with the Baltimore Orioles in 2006

In 2005, Mora once again hit 27 home runs, although his batting average and on-base percentage dropped. On May 19, 2006, Mora agreed to a three-year, $25 million deal that included a no-trade clause because Mora did not want to move his family to another city.

In 2006, Mora's home run total dropped to 16, and again dropped in 2007 to 14. Mora also saw his batting average fall to .274 for both seasons.

==== 2008 ====
Mora was named American League Player of the Month for August 2008. Mora batted .418 (41-for-98) with eight home runs and had an MLB-leading 32 RBIs in 24 games. He posted a .765 slugging percentage and a .455 on-base percentage, with 17 extra-base hits, including eight doubles. Mora had a 13 multi-hit games in August 2008 and maintained an eight-game hitting streak from August 1–10. On August 17 at Detroit, Mora went 5-for-6 with two doubles, two home runs, four runs scored and 6 RBI during a 16–8 Orioles win. Overall, Mora had five games in August in which he collected four-or-more RBIs. Mora injured his hamstring on August 29, 2008, missing the final games of his impressive month.

==== 2009 ====
On September 18, 2009, Brooks Robinson made a rare appearance at Camden Yards to honor Mora for moving into second all-time in games played at third base by an Oriole (behind only the Hall of Famer Brooks, himself). He presented Mora with the third base from the game he moved into second.

In 2009, he led all major league starting third basemen in range factor, at 3.14.

Mora's option was declined by the Orioles on October 29, 2009.

=== Colorado Rockies ===
On February 5, 2010, the Colorado Rockies signed Mora to a one-year, $1.275 million contract. He played in 113 games for the NL West third place Rockies (83-79) and batted .285 with seven home runs and 45 RBI.

=== Arizona Diamondbacks ===
Mora signed a one-year $2.35 million contract with the Arizona Diamondbacks on December 6, 2010. He was expected to replace Mark Reynolds as the starting third baseman. Mora missed a few days of spring training as a precautionary measure despite not having any serious injuries after his automobile was struck from behind by another vehicle on Arizona State Route 101 on March 7, 2011. He was in the starting lineup on Opening Day, scoring a run while going hitless in five at-bats in a 7–6 victory over the Rockies at Coors Field on April 1. His playing time eventually was limited due to the emergence of Ryan Roberts. After a 6–2 loss to the Cleveland Indians at Chase Field on June 29 in which he struck out as a pinch hitter for Zach Duke with one out and a runner on first base in the fifth inning, he was given his unconditional release effective the following day. He batted .228 with no home runs and 16 RBI in 42 games with the Diamondbacks. He allegedly officially announced his retirement as an active player on December 29, 2011, though in mid-January, Mora corrected that claim by saying he still wished to play in 2012.

=== World Baseball Classic ===
Mora agreed to represent his native country, Venezuela, in the 2006 World Baseball Classic, but pulled out after being denied the third base position in favor of Miguel Cabrera.

== Coaching career ==
On May 20, 2026, Mora was hired to serve as a hitting coach for the Leones de Yucatán of the Mexican League.

== Highlights ==
- 2× All-Star (2003, 2005)
- 2× American League Player of the Month (May 2004, August 2008)
- First player to hit a home run off the top of the foul pole at Camden Yards

== Career statistics ==
In 1,556 games over 13 seasons, Mora posted a .277 batting average (1,503-for-5,422) with 794 runs, 283 doubles, 19 triples, 171 home runs, 754 RBI, 93 stolen bases, 520 bases on balls, a .350 on-base percentage and a .431 slugging percentage. He finished his career with a .966 fielding percentage playing at all infield positions except catcher and at all three outfield positions. In nine postseason games, he hit .400 (6-for-15) with four runs, a home run and 2 RBI.

== Personal life ==
When he was seven years old, his father was murdered in front of him in Venezuela in a case of mistaken identity.

On July 28, 2001, Mora's wife Gisel gave birth to quintuplets at Johns Hopkins Hospital in Baltimore, Maryland. They also have an older daughter. The family resides in Fallston, Maryland.

In the Orioles media guide, Mora stated his most embarrassing moment as a player came in his rookie year in 1999 when, knowing little English, he thought his manager Bobby Valentine had told him to go to left field when he was actually being told to go to second base.

Mora was naturalized as a United States citizen in Baltimore on May 10, 2017. He holds U.S.-Venezuela dual citizenship.

== See also ==
- List of Major League Baseball players from Venezuela

Awards and achievements
Preceded by Carlos Beltrán; Miguel Cabrera	American League Player of the Month; May 2004; August 2008	Succeeded by Iván Rodríguez; Shin-Soo Choo
