= Fernando Lunar =

Venezuelan baseball player (born 1977)

- Catcher
- Born: May 25, 1977 (age 49); Cantaura, Anzoátegui State, Venezuela
- Batted: Right Threw: Right

MLB debut
- May 8, 2000, for the Atlanta Braves

Last MLB appearance
- April 11, 2002, for the Baltimore Orioles

MLB statistics
- Batting average: .224
- Doubles: 8
- Runs batted in: 22
- Stats at Baseball Reference

Teams
- Atlanta Braves (2000); Baltimore Orioles (2000–2002)

Fernando José Lunar [loo-NAR] (born May 25, 1977) is a Venezuelan former Major League Baseball (MLB) catcher who played for the Atlanta Braves (2000) and Baltimore Orioles (2000–02). He batted and threw right-handed. He played minor league baseball through 2007.

== Career ==
On June 24, 2000, while playing for the Atlanta Braves against the Milwaukee Brewers, Lunar was called for receiving a pitch with his foot outside of the catcher's box. A balk was assessed to pitcher Greg Maddux. Such a call, known as a "catcher's balk", is rarely seen in baseball.

In a three-year major league career, Lunar was a .224 hitter with 22 RBI and no home runs in 97 games. He played for the Somerset Patriots in the Atlantic League in 2005 and 2006. He last appeared in the minor leagues with the Mississippi Braves, the Class AA affiliate of the Atlanta Braves, in 2007.

== See also ==
- List of players from Venezuela in Major League Baseball
