= Seattle Mariners all-time roster =

List of baseball players

The following is a list of players, both past and current, who appeared at least in one game for the Seattle Mariners franchise.

Players in Bold are members of the National Baseball Hall of Fame.

Players in italics have had their numbers retired by the team.

List complete as of the 2026 season

== A ==
- (United States) David Aardsma, P, 2009–2010
- (United States) Glenn Abbott, P, 1977–1981, 1983
- (United States) Paul Abbott, P, 1998–2002
- (United States) Jim Acker, P, 1992
- (United States) Dustin Ackley, 2B/OF, 2011–2015
- (United States) Austin Adams, P, 2019
- (United States) Ty Adcock, P, 2023
- (Puerto Rico) Juan Agosto, P, 1992
- (United States) Ruben Alaniz, P, 2019
- (Canada) Andrew Albers, P, 2017
- (Venezuela) Eliézer Alfonzo, C, 2010
- (United States) Brian Allard, P, 1981
- (United States) Jamie Allen, 3B, 1983
- (United States) Kim Allen, 2B, 1980–1981
- (United States) Rod Allen, DH, 1983
- (Cuba) Yonder Alonso, 1B, 2017
- (United States) Dan Altavilla, P, 2016–2020
- (United States) Rich Amaral, IF/OF, 1991–1998
- (Dominican Republic) Abraham Almonte, OF, 2013–2014
- (United States) Larry Andersen, P, 1981–1982
- (United States) Jim Anderson, SS, 1980–1981
- (United States) Kade Anderson, P, 2026-Present
- (United States) Rick Anderson, P, 1980
- (United States) Tyler Anderson, P, 2021
- (United States) Robert Andino, SS/2B, 2013
- (United States) John Andreoli, OF, 2017
- (United States) Matt Andriese, P, 2021
- (United States) Eric Anthony, OF, 1994
- (Japan) Norichika Aoki, OF, 2016
- (United States) Shawn Armstrong, P, 2018–2019
- (Dominican Republic) Jonathan Aro, P, 2016
- (Mexico) Randy Arozarena, OF, 2024–Present
- (Colombia) Michael Arroyo, 2B/SS, 2026-Present
- (United States) Scott Atchison, P, 2004–2005
- (United States) Rick Auerbach, SS, 1981
- (United States) Rich Aurilia, SS, 2004
- (United States) Bobby Ayala, P, 1994–1998
- (United States) Bob Ayrault, P, 1993

== B ==
- (United States) Wally Backman, 2B, 1993
- (South Korea) Cha Seung Baek, P, 2004, 2006–2008
- (Dominican Republic) José Báez, 2B, 1977–1978
- (United States) Steve Balboni, 1B, 1988
- (United States) James Baldwin, P, 2002
- (Netherlands Antilles) Wladimir Balentien, OF, 2007–2009
- (United States) Scott Bankhead, P, 1987–1991
- (United States) Floyd Bannister, P, 1979–1982
- (United States) Brandon Bantz, C, 2013
- (United States) Josh Bard, C, 2010
- (Mexico) Salomé Barojas, P, 1984–1985
- (United States) Steve Baron, C, 2015
- (United States) Shawn Barton, P, 1992
- (United States) Anthony Bass, P, 2019
- (Dominican Republic) Miguel Batista, P, 2007–2009
- (Dominican Republic) Gerson Bautista, P, 2019
- (United States) Jake Bauers, 1B, 2021
- (United States) Mike Baumann, P, 2024
- (Canada) Jason Bay, OF, 2013
- (Venezuela) Eduard Bazardo, P, 2023–Present
- (United States) Charlie Beamon Jr., DH, 1978–1979
- (United States) Dave Beard, P, 1984
- (United States) Jim Beattie, P, 1980–1986
- (United States) Blake Beavan, P, 2011–2014
- (United States) Gordon Beckham, 2B, 2017–2018
- (United States) Tim Beckham, SS, 2019
- (Canada) Érik Bédard, P, 2008–2011
- (United States) Joe Beimel, P, 2014–2015
- (United States) Tim Belcher, P, 1995
- (United States) David Bell, 3B/2B, 1998–2001
- (Dominican Republic) **Adrián Beltré**, 3B, 2005–2009
- (United States) Andy Benes, P, 1995
- (Puerto Rico) Juan Beníquez, OF, 1980
- (Dominican Republic) Armando Benítez, P, 2003
- (Dominican Republic) Joaquin Benoit, P, 2016
- (United States) Christian Bergman, P, 2017–2018
- (United States) Brennan Bernardino, P, 2022
- (Puerto Rico) Tony Bernazard, 2B, 1983
- (Dominican Republic) Juan Bernhardt, DH, 1977–1979
- (Dominican Republic) Prelander Berroa, P, 2023
- (United States) Karl Best, P, 1983–1986
- (Cuba) Yuniesky Betancourt, SS, 2005–2009
- (United States) Jesse Biddle, P, 2019
- (United States) Braden Bishop, OF, 2019–2021
- (United States) Bud Black, P, 1981
- (Australia) Travis Blackley, P, 2004
- (Venezuela) Henry Blanco, C, 2013
- (United States) Ryan Bliss, 2B, 2024–Present
- (United States) Willie Bloomquist, IF/OF, 2002–2008, 2014–2015
- (Germany) Mike Blowers, 3B, 1992–1995, 1997, 1999
- (Puerto Rico) Hiram Bocachica, OF, 2004
- (United States) Bruce Bochte, 1B/OF, 1978–1982
- (United States) T. J. Bohn, OF, 2006
- (United States) Cody Bolton, P, 2024
- (United States) Jeremy Bonderman, P, 2013
- (United States) Barry Bonnell, OF, 1984–1986
- (United States) Bret Boone, 2B, 1992–1993, 2001–2005
- (United States) Joe Borchard, OF, 2006
- (United States) Pat Borders, C, 2001–2004, 2005
- (United States) Rich Bordi, P, 1982
- (United States) Ryan Borucki, P, 2022
- (United States) Chris Bosio, P, 1993–1996
- (United States) Shawn Boskie, P, 1994
- (United States) Thad Bosley, OF, 1982
- (Dominican Republic) Rafael Bournigal, SS, 1999
- (United States) Matt Bowman, P, 2024
- (United States) Matthew Boyd, P, 2022
- (United States) Chasen Bradford, P, 2018–2019
- (United States) Milton Bradley, OF, 2010–2011
- (United States) Phil Bradley, OF, 1983–1987
- (United States) Scott Bradley, C, 1986–1992
- (United States) Darren Bragg, OF, 1994–1996
- (United States) Roy Branch, P, 1979
- (United States) Mickey Brantley, OF, 1986–1989
- (United States) Russell Branyan, 1B, 2009–2010
- (Canada) Matt Brash, P, 2021–Present
- (United States) Steve Braun, OF, 1977–1978
- (United States) Brandon Brennan, P, 2019–2020
- (United States) Greg Briley, OF, 1988–1992
- (United States) Ben Broussard, 1B, 2006–2007
- (United States) Bobby Brown, OF, 1982
- (United States) Kevin D. Brown, P, 1992
- (United States) Mike Brown, P, 1986–1987
- (United States) Tom Brown, P, 1978
- (United States) Keon Broxton, OF, 2019
- (United States) Jay Bruce, OF, 2019
- (United States) Mike Brumley, SS, 1990
- (United States) Jaime Bubela, OF, 2005
- (United States) John Buck, C, 2014
- (United States) Jay Buhner, OF, 1988–2001
- (United States) JB Bukauskas, P, 2023
- (United States) Bud Bulling, C, 1981–1983
- (United States) Jim Bullinger, P, 1998
- (United States) Melvin Bunch, P, 1999
- (United States) Dave Burba, P, 1990–1991
- (Dominican Republic) Juan Burgos, P, 2025
- (United States) Jamie Burke, C, 2007–2009
- (United States) Steve Burke, P, 1977–1978
- (United States) Jeff Burroughs, OF, 1981
- (United States) Eric Byrnes, OF, 2010

== C ==
- (Panama) José Caballero, 2B, 2023
- (Colombia) Jolbert Cabrera, IF/OF, 2004
- (Venezuela) Miguel Cairo, IF, 2008
- (Puerto Rico) Iván Calderón, OF, 1984–1986
- (United States) Mike Cameron, OF, 2000–2003
- (Dominican Republic) Arquimedes Caminero, P, 2016
- (United States) Eric Campbell, 1B, 2021
- (United States) Isaiah Campbell, P, 2023
- (United States) Mike Campbell, P, 1987–1989
- (Mexico) Jorge Campillo, P, 2005–2007
- (Dominican Republic) Robinson Canó, 2B, 2014–2018
- (United States) Dominic Canzone, OF, 2023–Present
- (United States) Carter Capps, P, 2012–2013
- (United States) Matt Carasiti, P, 2019
- (Puerto Rico) Rafael Carmona, P, 1995–1997, 1999
- (United States) Mike Carp, 1B, 2009–2012
- (Venezuela) Giovanni Carrara, P, 2003
- (United States) Curt Casali, C, 2022
- (Dominican Republic) Blas Castano, P, 2025
- (Dominican Republic) Diego Castillo, P, 2021–2023
- (Venezuela) José Castillo, P, 2025
- (Dominican Republic) Luis F. Castillo, P, 2025
- (Dominican Republic) Luis M. Castillo, P, 2022-2026
- (Dominican Republic) Manny Castillo, 3B, 1982–1983
- (Dominican Republic) Welington Castillo, C, 2015
- (United States) Bill Caudill, P, 1982–1983
- (Dominican Republic) Domingo Cedeño, IF, 1999
- (Venezuela) Ronny Cedeño, IF–OF, 2009
- (United States) Al Chambers, DH/OF, 1983–1985
- (United States) J. T. Chargois, P, 2021, 2024
- (United States) Norm Charlton, P, 1993, 1995–1997, 2001
- (Venezuela) Endy Chávez, OF, 2009, 2013–2014
- (Venezuela) Raúl Chávez, C, 1998
- (United States) Travis Chick, P, 2006
- (South Korea) Shin-Soo Choo, OF, 2005–2006
- (United States) John Christensen, OF, 1987
- (United States) Jeff Cirillo, 3B, 2002–2003
- (United States) Steve Cishek, P, 2016–2017
- (United States) Bryan Clark, P, 1981–1983, 1990
- (United States) Stan Clarke, P, 1987
- (Dominican Republic) Jonatan Clase, OF, 2024
- (United States) Ken Clay, P, 1981
- (United States) Jeff Clement, C, 2007–2008
- (United States) Steve Clevenger, C, 2016
- (United States) Ken Cloude, P, 1997–1999
- (United States) Tyler Cloyd, P, 2017
- (United States) Dave Cochrane, IF/OF, 1989–1992
- (United States) Jim Colborn, P, 1978
- (United States) Greg Colbrunn, 1B, 2003
- (United States) Vince Coleman, OF, 1995
- (United States) Darnell Coles, 3B/OF, 1983–1985, 1988–1990
- (United States) Dave Collins, OF, 1977
- (Dominican Republic) Alex Colomé, P, 2018
- (Dominican Republic) Jesús Colomé, P, 2010
- (United States) Keith Comstock, P, 1989–1991
- (United States) Jim Converse, P, 1993–1995
- (United States) Ryan Cook, P, 2018
- (Puerto Rico) Joey Cora, 2B, 1995–1998
- (United States) Roy Corcoran, P, 2008–2009
- (United States) Chad Cordero, P, 2010
- (United States) Dan Cortes, P, 2010–2011
- (Cuba) Nestor Cortes Jr., P, 2020
- (United States) Henry Cotto, OF, 1988–1993
- (United States) Ryan Court, 3B, 2019
- (United States) Al Cowens, OF, 1982–1986
- (United States) Larry Cox, C, 1977, 1979–1980
- (United States) Ted Cox, 3B, 1980
- (United States) Rickey Cradle, OF, 1998
- (United States) Rod Craig, OF, 1979–1980
- (United States) J. P. Crawford, SS, 2019–Present
- (United States) Doug Creek, P, 2002
- (United States) Cooper Criswell, P, 2026-Present
- (Dominican Republic) Francisco Cruceta, P, 2006
- (Puerto Rico) José Cruz Jr., OF, 1997
- (Puerto Rico) Julio Cruz, 2B, 1977–1983
- (Dominican Republic) Nelson Cruz, OF/DH, 2015–2018
- (United States) Todd Cruz, SS, 1982–1983
- (United States) John Cummings, P, 1993–1995
- (United States) Zac Curtis, P, 2017
- (United States) Jack Cust, DH, 2011

== D ==
- (United States) Jeff Darwin, P, 1994
- (United States) Tom Davey, P, 1999
- (United States) Nick Davila, P, 2026-Present
- (United States) Alvin Davis, 1B/DH, 1984–1991
- (United States) Ben Davis, C, 2002–2004
- (United States) Jason Davis, P, 2007
- (United States) Russ Davis, 3B, 1996–1999
- (United States) Tim Davis, P, 1994–1997
- (United States) Scott Ray Davison, P, 1995–1996
- (United States) Joe Decker, P, 1979
- (United States) Brett de Geus, P, 2024
- (United States) Chase De Jong, P, 2017
- (United States) Steve Delabar, P, 2011–2012
- (Puerto Rico) Luis DeLeón, P, 1989
- (Puerto Rico) Puchy Delgado, OF, 1977
- (United States) Rich DeLucia, P, 1990–1993
- (United States) Chris Denorfia, OF, 2014
- (United States) Ross Detwiler, P, 2018
- (United States) Alex Diaz, OF, 1995–1996
- (Puerto Rico) Edwin Díaz, P, 2016–2018
- (Venezuela) Jhonathan Díaz, P, 2024–Present
- (Puerto Rico) Mario Díaz, SS, 1987–1989
- (United States) R. A. Dickey, P, 2008
- (United States) Greg Dobbs, 3B, 2004–2006
- (Dominican Republic) Seranthony Domínguez, P, 2026-Present
- (United States) Brendan Donovan, UT, 2026-Present
- (United States) Sean Doolittle, P, 2021
- (United States) Dick Drago, P, 1981
- (United States) Rob Dressler, P, 1979–1980
- (Canada) Rob Ducey, OF, 1997–1998
- (United States) Robert Dugger, P, 2021
- (United States) Zach Duke, P, 2018
- (United States) Justin Dunn, P, 2019–2021
- (United States) Mike Dunne, P, 1989
- (United States) Jarrod Dyson, OF, 2017

== E ==
- (United States) Gary Eave, P, 1990
- (United States) Dave Edler, 3B, 1980–1983
- (United States) Carl Edwards Jr., P, 2020
- (Cuba) Roenis Elías, P, 2014–2015, 2018–2019, 2022
- (United States) Drew Ellis, 2B, 2022
- (United States) Jason Ellison, OF, 2007
- (United States) Colt Emerson, SS/3B, 2026-Present
- (Dominican Republic) Edwin Encarnacion, DH, 2019
- (United States) Greg Erardi, P, 1977
- (United States) Phillip Ervin, OF, 2020
- (United States) Danny Espinosa 2B, 2017
- (Venezuela) Álvaro Espinoza, IF, 1997
- (United States) Jim Essian, C, 1982
- (United States) Logan Evans, P, 2025
- (United States) Carl Everett, OF/DH, 2006

== F ==
- (United States) Stuart Fairchild, OF, 2022, 2026
- (United States) Danny Farquhar, P, 2013–2015
- (United States) Jeff Fassero, P, 1997–1999
- (United States) Ryan Feierabend, P, 2006–2008
- (United States) Mike Felder, OF, 1993
- (United States) Caleb Ferguson, P, 2025
- (Dominican Republic) Félix Fermín, SS, 1994–1995
- (Dominican Republic) José A. Ferrer, P, 2026
- (United States) Matt Festa, P, 2018–2019, 2022–2023
- (United States) Bruce Fields, OF, 1988–1989
- (United States) Casey Fien, P, 2017
- (United States) Chone Figgins, IF, 2010–2012
- (United States) Steve Fireovid, P, 1986
- (United States) Dan Firova, C, 1981–1982
- (United States) Brian Fisher, P, 1992
- (United States) Doug Fister, P, 2009–2011
- (United States) Brian Fitzgerald, P, 2002
- (United States) Dave Fleming, P, 1991–1995
- (United States) Aaron Fletcher, P, 2020–2021
- (United States) Chris Flexen, P, 2021–2023
- (United States) Harry Ford, C, 2025
- (United States) Mike Ford, 1B/DH, 2022, 2023
- (Cuba) Tony Fossas, P, 1998
- (United States) Ray Fosse, C, 1977
- (United States) Jake Fraley, OF, 2019–2021
- (United States) Ty France, 1B, 2020–2024
- (United States) Nick Franklin, 2B, 2013–2014
- (United States) Ryan Franklin, P, 1999, 2001–2005
- (United States) Seth Frankoff, P, 2020
- (United States) Adam Frazier, 2B/OF, 2022
- (United States) Mike Freeman, 1B, 2016–2017
- (United States) David Freitas, C, 2018–2019
- (United States) Luke French, P, 2009–2010
- (United States) Steve Frey, P, 1995
- (Colombia) Emiliano Fruto, P, 2006
- (United States) Brian Fuentes, P, 2001
- (United States) Charlie Furbush, P, 2011–2015

== G ==
- (United States) Steve Gajkowski, P, 1998
- (United States) Bob Galasso, P, 1977, 1981
- (Mexico) Yovani Gallardo, P, 2017
- (United States) Ben Gamel, OF, 2016–2018
- (United States) Brandyn Garcia, P, 2025
- (Venezuela) Freddy García, P, 1999–2004
- (Dominican Republic) Yimi García, P, 2024
- (Canada) Mike Gardiner, P, 1990
- (United States) Ryan Garton, P, 2017–2019
- (United States) Mitch Garver, DH/C, 2024-2026
- (United States) Brent Gates, 2B, 1997
- (United States) Sam Gaviglio, P, 2017
- (United States) Cory Gearrin, P, 2019
- (United States) Dave Geisel, P, 1984–1985
- (United States) Joey Gerber, P, 2020
- (United States) Logan Gilbert, 2021–Present
- (United States) Brian J. Giles, 2B, 1990
- (United States) Ken Giles, P, 2022
- (United States) Cole Gillespie, OF, 2014
- (United States) Chris Gimenez, C, 2011
- (United States) Charles Gipson, OF, 1998–2002
- (United States) Jerry Don Gleaton, P, 1981–1982
- (United States) George Glinatsis, P, 1994
- (Venezuela) José Godoy, C, 2021
- (United States) Erik Goeddel, P, 2018
- (United States) Marco Gonzales, P, 2017–2023
- (Dominican Republic) Domingo González, P, 2026-Present
- (Venezuela) Wiki González, C, 2005
- (United States) **Rich Gossage**, P, 1994
- (United States) Tuffy Gosewisch, C, 2017
- (United States) Trevor Gott, P, 2023
- (United States) Mark Grant, P, 1992
- (United States) Kendall Graveman, P, 2020–2021
- (United States) Gary Gray, 1B, 1981–1982
- (United States) Jeff Gray, P, 2011
- (United States) Nick Green, IF, 2007
- (United States) Sean Green, P, 2006–2008
- (United States) Ken Griffey Sr., OF, 1990–1991
- (United States) **Ken Griffey Jr.**, OF, 1989–1999, 2009–2010
- (United States) Justin Grimm, P, 2018
- (United States) Zac Grotz, P, 2019–2020
- (Venezuela) Mayckol Guaipe, P, 2015–2016
- (United States) Eddie Guardado, P, 2004–2006
- (United States) Lee Guetterman, P, 1984, 1986–1987, 1995–1996
- (Venezuela) Giomar Guevara, SS, 1997–1999
- (United States) Taylor Guilbeau, P, 2019–2020
- (Venezuela) Carlos Guillén, SS, 1998–2003
- (Dominican Republic) José Guillén, OF, 2007
- (United States) Brad Gulden, C, 1981
- (United States) Eric Gunderson, P, 1992
- (Venezuela) Franklin Gutiérrez, OF, 2009–2013, 2015–2016

== H ==
- (United States) Sam Haggerty, UT, 2020–2024
- (United States) Jesse Hahn, P, 2025
- (United States) John Halama, P, 1999–2002
- (United States) John Hale, OF, 1978–1979
- (United States) Bill Hall, IF–OF, 2009
- (Netherlands) Greg Halman, OF, 2010–2011
- (United States) Mike Hampton, P, 1993
- (United States) Emerson Hancock, P, 2023–Present
- (United States) Mitch Haniger, OF, 2017–2022, 2024
- (United States) Jack Hannahan, 3B, 2009
- (United States) Jacob Hannemann, OF, 2017
- (United States) Dave Hansen, 3B, 2004–2005
- (United States) Erik Hanson, P, 1988–1993
- (United States) J. A. Happ, P, 2015
- (United States) Tim Harikkala, P, 1995–1996
- (United States) Aaron Harang, P, 2013
- (United States) Gene Harris, P, 1989–1992
- (United States) Jeff Harris, P, 2005–2006
- (United States) Corey Hart, OF, 2014
- (Japan) Shigetoshi Hasegawa, P, 2002–2005
- (United States) Bill Haselman, C, 1992–1994
- (United States) Ryon Healy, 1B, 2018–2019
- (United States) Dave Heaverlo, P, 1980
- (United States) Bert Heffernan, C, 1992
- (United States) Dave Henderson, OF, 1981–1986
- (United States) **Rickey Henderson**, OF, 2000
- (United States) Steve Henderson, OF, 1983–1984
- (United States) Dave Hengel, OF, 1986–1988
- (United States) Butch Henry, P, 1999
- (United States) Dwayne Henry, P, 1993
- (Cuba) Guillermo Heredia, OF, 2016–2018
- (Venezuela) Carlos Hernández, 2B, 2000
- (Venezuela) Félix Hernández, P, 2005–2019
- (United States) Jonathan Hernández, P, 2024
- (Dominican Republic) Teoscar Hernández, OF, 2023
- (United States) Chris Herrmann, C, 2018
- (United States) Chris Heston, P, 2017
- (United States) Greg Hibbard, P, 1994
- (United States) John Hicks, C, 2015
- (United States) Glenallen Hill, OF, 1998
- (United States) Marc Hill, C, 1980
- (United States) Milt Hill, P, 1994
- (United States) Brett Hinchliffe, P, 1999
- (United States) Rich Hinton, P, 1979
- (Japan) Yoshihisa Hirano, P, 2020
- (United States) Sterling Hitchcock, P, 1996
- (United States) Kevin Hodges, P, 2000
- (United States) David Holdridge, P, 1998
- (United States) Dave Hollins, 3B, 1996
- (United States) Brad Holman, P, 1993
- (United States) Brian Holman, P, 1989–1991
- (United States) Mark Holzemer, P, 1997
- (United States) Rick Honeycutt, P, 1977–1980
- (United States) Alex Hoppe, P, 2026
- (United States) Willie Horton, OF, 1979–1980
- (United States) Tom House, P, 1977–1978
- (United States) Chris Howard, C, 1991, 1993–1994
- (United States) Dann Howitt, OF, 1992–1993
- (United States) Jon Huber, P, 2006–2007
- (United States) Joe Hudson, C, 2020
- (United States) Mark Huismann, P, 1986–1987
- (United States) Tug Hulett, 2B, 2008
- (United States) Cooper Hummel, C/OF, 2023
- (United States) Brian L. Hunter, OF, 1999
- (United States) Brian R. Hunter, 1B, 1996
- (Venezuela) Edwin Hurtado, P, 1996–1997
- (United States) Butch Huskey, OF, 1999
- (United States) Jeff Huson, IF, 1998

== I ==
- (United States) Chris Iannetta, C, 2016
- (United States) Raúl Ibañez, OF, 1996–2000, 2004–2008, 2013
- (Japan) Hisashi Iwakuma, P 2012–2017

== J ==
- (United States) Austin Jackson, OF, 2014–2015
- (United States) Luke Jackson, P, 2025
- (United States) Mike Jackson, P, 1988–1991, 1996
- (United States) Ryan Jackson, 1B, 1999
- (United States) Bucky Jacobsen, 1B, 2004
- (United States) Chris Jakubauskas, P, 2009
- (United States) Travis Jankowski, OF, 2022
- (United States) Kevin Jarvis, P, 2004
- (United States) John Jaso, C/DH, 2012
- (Dominican Republic) Stan Javier, OF, 2000–2001
- (United States) Reggie Jefferson, DH, 1994
- (Venezuela) César Jiménez, P, 2006, 2008
- (Venezuela) Luis Antonio Jiménez, DH 2012
- (United States) Charlton Jimerson, OF, 2007–2008
- (United States) Connor Joe, OF/1B, 2026-Present
- (Japan) Kenji Johjima, C, 2006–2009
- (United States) **Randy Johnson**, P, 1989–1998
- (United States) Rob Johnson, C, 2007–2010
- (United States) Steve Johnson, P, 2016
- (United States) Adam Jones, OF, 2006–2007
- (United States) Calvin Jones, P, 1991–1992
- (United States) James Jones, OF, 2014–2015
- (United States) Odell Jones, P, 1979
- (United States) Rick Jones, P, 1977–1978
- (United States) Ross Jones, SS, 1986
- (United States) Ruppert Jones, OF, 1977–1979
- (United States) Tracy Jones, OF, 1990–1991
- (United States) Ricky Jordan, 1B, 1996
- (United States) Skip Jutze, C, 1977

== K ==
- (United States) Nate Karns, P, 2016
- (Japan) Munenori Kawasaki, SS/2B, 2012
- (United States) Justin Kaye, P, 2002
- (United States) Bob Kearney, C, 1984–1987
- (United States) Mike Kekich, P, 1977
- (United States) Jarred Kelenic, 2021–2023
- (United States) Shawn Kelley, P, 2009–2012
- (Panama) Roberto Kelly, OF, 1997
- (United States) Adam Kennedy, 2B, 2011
- (United States) Buddy Kennedy, IF, 2026
- (United States) Logan Kensing, P, 2015
- (Japan) Masao Kida, P, 2004–2005
- (Japan) Yusei Kikuchi, P, 2019–2021
- (United States) Kevin King, P, 1993–1995
- (United States) Mike Kingery, OF, 1987–1989
- (Aruba) Gene Kingsale, OF, 2001–2002
- (United States) Josh Kinney, P, 2012
- (United States) George Kirby, P, 2022–Present
- (United States) Joe Klink, P, 1996
- (United States) Brent Knackert, P, 1990
- (United States) Andrew Knapp, C, 2022
- (United States) Matt Koch, P, 2022
- (United States) Casey Kotchman, 1B, 2010
- (United States) Jackson Kowar, P, 2025
- (United States) Randy Kramer, P, 1992
- (United States) Chad Kreuter, C, 1995
- (United States) Bill Krueger, P, 1991, 1995

== L ==
- (United States) Pete Ladd, P, 1986
- (United States) Aaron Laffey, P, 2011
- (United States) Bobby LaFromboise, P, 2013
- (United States) Bryan LaHair, 1B, 2008
- (United States) Brady Lail, P, 2020–2021
- (United States) Jake Lamb, OF, 2022
- (United States) Tom Lampkin, C, 1999–2001
- (United States) Ryan Langerhans, OF, 2009–2010, 2011
- (United States) Mark Langston, P, 1984–1989
- (Dominican Republic) Sauryn Lao, P, 2025
- (United States) Jack Larsen, OF, 2022
- (United States) Tommy La Stella, 3B/DH, 2023
- (United States) Casey Lawrence, P, 2017–2018, 2025–Present
- (United States) Matt Lawton, OF, 2006
- (United States) Bill Laxton, P, 1977
- (United States) Jack Lazorko, P, 1985
- (United States) Brandon League, P, 2010–2012
- (United States) Mike Leake, P, 2017–2019
- (United States) Tim Leary, P, 1992–1993
- (United States) Wade LeBlanc, P, 2016, 2018–2019
- (United States) Cliff Lee, P, 2010
- (South Korea) Dae-Ho Lee, 1B, 2016
- (United States) Casey Legumina, P, 2025–2026
- (United States) Mark Leiter, P, 1999
- (United States) Patrick Lennon, OF, 1991–1992
- (United States) Jeffrey Leonard, OF, 1989–1990
- (United States) Dominic Leone, P, 2014–2015, 2023
- (United States) Justin Leone, 3B, 2004
- (Belgium) Brian Lesher, OF, 2000
- (United States) Jim Lewis, P, 1979, 1985
- (United States) Kyle Lewis, OF, 2019–2022
- (Italy) Alex Liddi, 3B, 2011–2013
- (United States) Adam Lind, 1B, 2016
- (Venezuela) Felipe Lira, P, 1997–1998
- (United States) Joe Lis, 1B, 1977
- (United States) Greg Litton, 2B, 1993
- (United States) Bobby Livingston, P, 2006
- (United States) Walker Lockett, P, 2020
- (United States) Tyler Locklear, 1B, 2024
- (United States) Kameron Loe, P, 2013
- (United States) Bob Long, P, 1985
- (United States) Shed Long Jr., SS, 2019–2021
- (United States) Aaron Looper, P, 2003
- (United States) Tim Lopes, OF, 2019–2020
- (Mexico) Carlos López, OF, 1977
- (Venezuela) José López, 2B, 2004–2010
- (United States) Mickey Lopez, 2B, 2004
- (United States) Andrew Lorraine, P, 1998
- (United States) Vance Lovelace, P, 1990
- (United States) Torey Lovullo, P, 1994
- (United States) Derek Lowe, P, 1997
- (United States) Mark Lowe, P, 2006–2010, 2015
- (United States) Josh Lueke, P, 2011
- (United States) Lucas Luetge, P, 2012–2015

== M ==
- (United States) John Mabry, OF, 1999–2000, 2003
- (United States) Frank MacCormack, P, 1977
- (Venezuela) Robert Machado, C, 2000
- (Venezuela) Jean Machi, P, 2017
- (United States) Quinn Mack, OF, 1994
- (United States) Mike Maddux, P, 1997
- (United States) Bobby Madritsch, P, 2004–2005
- (United States) Dave Magadan, 3B, 1993
- (United States) Matt Magill, P, 2019–2020
- (United States) Jim Maler, 1B, 1981–1983
- (United States) Matt Mangini, 3B, 2010
- (United States) Jeff Manto, 3B, 1996
- (Dominican Republic) Josías Manzanillo, P, 1997
- (United States) Nick Margevicius, P, 2020–2022
- (United States) Mike Marjama, C, 2017–2018
- (United States) Parker Markel, P, 2019
- (United States) Cade Marlowe, OF, 2023–2024
- (Dominican Republic) Jose Marmolejos, OF, 2020–2021
- (United States) Evan Marshall, P, 2017
- (Dominican Republic) Dámaso Marte, P, 1999
- (Dominican Republic) Ketel Marte, SS, 2015–2016
- (United States) Al Martin, OF, 2000–2001
- (United States) Cody Martin, P, 2016–2017
- (Cuba) Leonys Martin, OF, 2016
- (Nicaragua) Dennis Martínez, P, 1997
- (Puerto Rico) **Edgar Martínez**, DH, 1987–2004
- (Dominican Republic) Manny Martínez, OF, 1996
- (United States) Tino Martinez, 1B, 1990–1995
- (United States) John Marzano, C, 1996–1998
- (United States) Miles Mastrobuoni, UT, 2025–Present
- (Dominican Republic) Julio Mateo, P, 2002–2007
- (United States) Gary Matthews, OF, 1987
- (United States) Brandon Maurer, P, 2013–2014
- (United States) Cameron Maybin, OF, 2020
- (United States) Jack Mayfield, 3B, 2021
- (United States) Greg McCarthy, P, 1996–1998
- (United States) David McCarty, 1B, 1998
- (United States) Darren McCaughan, P, 2021, 2023
- (United States) Reggie McClain, P, 2019
- (United States) Quinton McCracken, OF, 2004
- (United States) Easton McGee, P, 2023
- (United States) Bill McGuire, C, 1988–1989
- (United States) Vance McHenry, SS, 1981–1982
- (United States) David McKay, P, 2019
- (United States) Byron McLaughlin, P, 1977–1980
- (United States) Mark McLemore, 2B, 2000–2003
- (United States) Tom McMillan, SS, 1977
- (United States) Rusty Meacham, P, 1996
- (United States) Gil Meche, P, 1999–2000, 2003–2006
- (United States) Jim Mecir, P, 1995
- (United States) Doc Medich, P, 1977
- (Venezuela) Yoervis Medina, P, 2013–2015
- (United States) Scott Medvin, P, 1990
- (Puerto Rico) José Meléndez, P, 1990
- (Mexico) Mario Mendoza, SS, 1979–1980
- (United States) Paul Menhart, P, 1996
- (Puerto Rico) Orlando Mercado, C, 1982–1984
- (Dominican Republic) José Mesa, P, 1999–2000
- (United States) Randy Messenger, P, 2008–2009
- (United States) Dan Meyer, 1B, 1977–1981
- (United States) Chad Meyers, 2B, 2003
- (United States) Keynan Middleton, P, 2021
- (United States) Matt Mieske, OF, 1999
- (United States) Bob Milacki, P, 1996
- (United States) Larry Milbourne, 2B, 1977–1980, 1984
- (United States) Wade Miley, P, 2015–2016
- (United States) Brad Miller, SS, 2013–2015
- (United States) Bryce Miller, P, 2023-2026
- (United States) Tyson Miller, P, 2024
- (United States) Wyatt Mills, P, 2020–2022
- (United States) Kevin Millwood, P, 2012
- (United States) Hoby Milner, P, 2026-Present
- (United States) Tommy Milone, P, 2019, 2022–2023
- (United States) Blas Minor, P, 1996
- (United States) Paul Mirabella, P, 1984–1986
- (Cuba) Ariel Miranda, 2016–2018
- (United States) Anthony Misiewicz, P, 2020–2022
- (United States) Keith Mitchell, OF, 1994
- (United States) Kevin Mitchell, OF, 1992
- (United States) Paul Mitchell, P, 1977–1979
- (United States) Shane Monahan, OF, 1998–1999
- (United States) John Montague, P, 1977–1979
- (United States) Mike Montgomery, P, 2015–2016
- (United States) Rich Monteleone, P, 1987
- (Venezuela) Jesús Montero, DH/C, 2012–2015
- (Dominican Republic) Rafael Montero, P, 2020–2021
- (Cuba) Lázaro Montes, OF/DH, 2026-Present
- (United States) Andrew Moore, P, 2017–2019
- (United States) Adam Moore, C, 2009–2011
- (United States) Dylan Moore, UT, 2019–2025
- (United States) Mike Moore, P, 1982–1988
- (United States) Tommy Moore, P, 1977
- (Cuba) Kendrys Morales, 1B/DH, 2013, 2014
- (United States) Mike Morgan, P, 1985–1987
- (United States) Mike Morin, P, 2018
- (United States) Logan Morrison, 1B, 2014–2015
- (United States) Brandon Morrow, P, 2007–2009
- (United States) Mike Morse, SS/OF 2005–2008, 2013
- (United States) John Moses, OF, 1982–1987, 1992
- (United States) Taylor Motter, SS, 2017–2018
- (United States) Jamie Moyer, P, 1996–2006
- (United States) Terry Mulholland, P, 1996
- (Mexico) Andrés Muñoz, P, 2021–Present
- (United States) Penn Murfee, P, 2022–2023
- (United States) Rob Murphy, P, 1991
- (United States) Tom Murphy, C, 2019–2023
- (United States) Ron Musselman, P, 1982
- (United States) Mike Myers, P, 2004

== N ==
- (United States) Clint Nageotte, P, 2004–2006
- (United States) Bill Nahorodny, C, 1984
- (United States) Jerry Narron, C, 1980–1981, 1987
- (Venezuela) Omar Narváez, C, 2019
- (Venezuela) Oswaldo Navarro, SS, 2006
- (Canada) Josh Naylor, 1B, 2025–Present
- (United States) Kristopher Negron, 1B, 2018–2019
- (United States) Gene Nelson, P, 1982–1983
- (United States) Jamie Nelson, C, 1983
- (United States) Jeff Nelson, P, 1992–1995, 2001–2003, 2005
- (United States) Ricky Nelson, OF, 1983–1986
- (United States) Marc Newfield, OF, 1993–1995
- (United States) Ljay Newsome, P, 2020–2021
- (United States) Warren Newson, OF, 1995
- (Dominican Republic) Juan Nicasio, P, 2018
- (United States) Tom Niedenfuer, P, 1989
- (United States) Vinny Nittoli, P, 2021
- (United States) Donell Nixon, OF, 1987
- (Dominican Republic) Héctor Noesí, P, 2012–2014
- (United States) Austin Nola, C 2019–2020
- (United States) Greg Norton, IF/OF, 2008
- (United States) Jacob Nottingham, C, 2021
- (Puerto Rico) Edwin Núñez, P, 1982–1988
- (United States) Vidal Nuño, P, 2015–2016

== O ==
- (United States) Pete O'Brien, 1B, 1990–1993
- (United States) Riley O'Brien, P, 2022
- (United States) Eric O'Flaherty, P, 2006–2008
- (United States) Brian O'Keefe, C, 2022–2023
- (United States) Shawn O'Malley, OF, 2015–2016
- (United States) Joseph Odom, C, 2020
- (Dominican Republic) José Offerman, SS, 2002
- (Mexico) Miguel Ojeda, C, 2005
- (United States) John Olerud, 1B, 2000–2004
- (Puerto Rico) Omar Olivares, P, 1997
- (United States) Joe Oliver, C, 1998, 2000
- (Dominican Republic) Miguel Olivo, C, 2004–2005, 2011–2012
- (United States) Edgar Olmos, P, 2015
- (United States) Garrett Olson, P, 2009–2010
- (United States) Tyler Olson, P, 2015
- (United States) Steve Ontiveros, P, 1993
- (United States) Dillon Overton, P, 2017
- (United States) Spike Owen, SS, 1983–1986

== P ==
- (United States) Tom Paciorek, OF, 1978–1981
- (United States) Kevin Padlo, 2B, 2021–2022
- (Canada) Dave Pagan, P, 1977
- (United States) Emilio Pagán, P, 2017
- (Dominican Republic) José Paniagua, P, 1998–2001
- (United States) Blake Parker, P, 2016
- (United States) Clay Parker, P, 1987, 1992
- (United States) John Parrish, P, 2007
- (United States) Lance Parrish, C, 1992
- (United States) Mike Parrott, P, 1978–1981
- (United States) Casey Parsons, OF, 1981
- (United States) Kevin Pasley, C, 1977–1978
- (United States) David Pauley, P, 2010–2011
- (Canada) James Paxton, P, 2013–2018, 2021
- (United States) James Pazos, P, 2017–2018
- (Dominican Republic) Carlos Peguero, OF, 2011–2013
- (United States) Wily Mo Peña, DH, 2011
- (Dominican Republic) Joel Peralta, P, 2016
- (United States) Jack Perconte, 2B, 1984–1985
- (Venezuela) Jhonny Pereda, C, 2026-Present
- (United States) Eduardo Pérez, 1B, 2006
- (Mexico) Óliver Pérez, P, 2012–2013
- (Venezuela) Robert Pérez, OF, 1998
- (United States) **Gaylord Perry**, P, 1982–1983
- (Venezuela) Roberto Petagine, 1B, 2006
- (United States) David Phelps, P, 2017
- (United States) Ken Phelps, DH, 1983–1988
- (Dominican Republic) Michael Pineda, P, 2011
- (Puerto Rico) Joel Piñeiro, P, 2000–2006
- (United States) Greg Pirkl, 1B, 1993–1996
- (United States) Erik Plantenberg, P, 1993–1994
- (United States) Bill Plummer, C, 1978
- (United States) Scott Podsednik, OF, 2001–2002
- (Dominican Republic) Jorge Polanco, 2B/3B, 2024–2025
- (United States) Dick Pole, P, 1977–1978
- (United States) AJ Pollock, OF, 2023
- (Canada) Zach Pop, P, 2025
- (United States) Max Povse, P, 2017
- (United States) Alonzo Powell, OF, 1991
- (United States) Boog Powell, OF, 2017
- (United States) Dennis Powell, P, 1987–1990, 1992–1993
- (United States) Ted Power, P, 1993
- (Dominican Republic) Arquimedez Pozo, 3B, 1995
- (United States) Jim Presley, 3B, 1984–1989
- (United States) Stephen Pryor, P, 2012–2014
- (United States) Pat Putnam, 1B, 1983–1984
- (United States) J. J. Putz, P, 2003–2008

== Q ==
- (Puerto Rico) Rey Quiñones, SS, 1986–1989
- (Venezuela) Humberto Quintero, C, 2013–2014
- (Venezuela) Guillermo Quiróz, C, 2006, 2009–2010

== R ==
- (United States) Brian Raabe, 3B, 1997
- (United States) John Rabb, C, 1988
- (Canada) Ryan Radmanovich, OF, 1998
- (United States) Cal Raleigh, C, 2021–Present
- (United States) Luke Raley, OF/1B, 2024–Present
- (Nicaragua) Erasmo Ramírez, P, 2012–2014, 2017–2018
- (United States) Horacio Ramírez, P, 2007
- (Nicaragua) J. C. Ramírez, P, 2015
- (Dominican Republic) José Ramírez, P, 2015
- (Dominican Republic) Yohan Ramirez, P, 2020–2022
- (Dominican Republic) Domingo Ramos, SS, 1982–1987
- (United States) Robert Ramsay, P, 1999–2000
- (United States) Lenny Randle, 3B, 1981–1982
- (United States) Rob Rasmussen, P, 2015
- (United States) Shane Rawley, P, 1978–1981
- (United States) Chris Ray, P, 2011
- (United States) Robbie Ray, P, 2022–2023
- (United States) Jeremy Reed, OF, 2004–2008
- (United States) Jerry Reed, P, 1986–1990
- (United States) Rob Refsnyder, DH/OF, 2026
- (United States) Chris Reitsma, P, 2007
- (United States) Desi Relaford, SS, 2002
- (United States) Rick Renteria, 2B, 1987–1988
- (United States) Dave Revering, 1B, 1982
- (United States) Craig Reynolds, SS, 1977–1978
- (United States) Harold Reynolds, 2B, 1983–1992
- (United States) Arthur Rhodes, P, 2000–2003, 2008
- (United States) Pat Rice, P, 1991
- (Puerto Rico) Yacksel Ríos, P, 2021
- (United States) Bill Risley, P, 1994–1995
- (Venezuela) Leo Rivas, SS, 2024–Present
- (Puerto Rico) René Rivera, C, 2004–2006
- (United States) Donn Roach, P, 2016
- (United States) Dave Roberts, P, 1980
- (United States) Leon Roberts, OF, 1978–1980
- (United States) Bob Robertson, 1B, 1978
- (United States) Daniel Robertson, OF, 2016
- (United States) Trayvon Robinson, OF, 2011–2012
- (Dominican Republic) Víctor Robles, OF, 2024–Present
- (United States) Brock Rodden, SS/2B, 2026-Present
- (Dominican Republic) Fernando Rodney, P, 2014–2015
- (United States) Alex Rodriguez, SS, 1994–2000
- (United States) Frank Rodríguez, P, 1999–2000
- (Venezuela) José Rodríguez, P, 2023
- (Dominican Republic) Julio Rodríguez, OF, 2022–Present
- (Venezuela) Luis Rodríguez, SS, 2011
- (United States) Ron Roenicke, OF, 1983
- (United States) Dan Rohrmeier, 1B, 1997
- (United States) Josh Rojas, 3B/OF, 2023–2024
- (United States) David Rollins, P, 2015–2016
- (United States) Stefen Romero, OF, 2014–2016
- (United States) Andrew Romine, P, 2018
- (Mexico) Enrique Romo, P, 1977–1978
- (United States) Sergio Romo, P, 2022
- (United States) Zac Rosscup, P, 2019
- (Puerto Rico) Rico Rossy, SS, 1998
- (Australia) Ryan Rowland-Smith, P, 2007–2010
- (United States) Michael Rucker, P, 2026-Present
- (United States) Chance Ruffin, P, 2011–2013
- (United States) Justin Ruggiano, OF, 2015
- (Panama) Carlos Ruiz, C, 2017
- (United States) Nick Rumbelow, P, 2018–2019
- (United States) Brendan Ryan, SS, 2011–2013
- (United States) Ryder Ryan, P, 2023
- (United States) Marc Rzepczynski, P, 2018

== S ==
- (United States) Casey Sadler, P, 2020–2021
- (United States) Connor Sadzeck, P, 2019
- (United States) Roger Salkeld, P, 1993–1994
- (United States) Adrian Sampson, P, 2016
- (Puerto Rico) Rey Sánchez, SS, 2003
- (United States) Anthony Sanders, OF, 2000–2001
- (United States) Scott Sanders, P, 1997
- (Dominican Republic) Carlos Santana, 1B/DH, 2022
- (Dominican Republic) Domingo Santana, OF, 2019
- (United States) Hector Santiago, P, 2021
- (Dominican Republic) Ramón Santiago, SS, 2004–2005
- (Dominican Republic) Gregory Santos, P, 2024–2025
- (Venezuela) Luis Sardinas, 2B, 2016
- (Venezuela) Manny Sarmiento, P, 1980
- (Japan) Kazuhiro Sasaki, P, 2000–2003
- (United States) Mackey Sasser, C, 1993–1994
- (United States) Tayler Saucedo, P, 2023–2025
- (United States) Joe Saunders, P, 2013
- (Canada) Michael Saunders, OF, 2009–2014
- (United States) Jeff Schaefer, IF, 1990–1992
- (United States) Aaron Scheffer, P, 1999
- (United States) Dave Schmidt, P, 1992
- (United States) Mike Schooler, P, 1988–1992
- (United States) Donnie Scott, C, 1985
- (South Africa) Tayler Scott, P, 2019
- (United States) Evan Scribner, P, 2016–2017
- (United States) Rod Scurry, P, 1988
- (United States) Kyle Seager, 3B, 2011–2021
- (United States) Chris Seddon P, 2010
- (United States) David Segui, 1B, 1998–1999
- (Cuba) Diego Seguí, P, 1977
- (Dominican Republic) Jean Segura, 2B, 2017–2018
- (United States) Aaron Sele, P, 2000–2001, 2005
- (United States) Paul Serna, IF, 1981–1982
- (United States) Paul Sewald, P, 2021–2023
- (United States) Richie Sexson, 1B, 2005–2008
- (United States) Jimmy Sexton, SS, 1977
- (United States) Bryan Shaw, P, 2020
- (United States) Andy Sheets, IF, 1996–1997
- (United States) Larry Sheets, OF, 1993
- (United States) Justus Sheffield, P, 2019–2022
- (United States) Chris Shelton, 1B, 2009
- (United States) George Sherrill, P, 2004–2007, 2012
- (United States) Steve Shields, P, 1987
- (United States) Zak Shinall, P, 1993
- (United States) Kelly Shoppach, C, 2013
- (Puerto Rico) Rubén Sierra, OF, 2002
- (Venezuela) Carlos Silva, P, 2008–2009
- (United States) Shae Simmons, P, 2017
- (United States) Joe Simpson, OF, 1979–1982
- (United States) Josh Simpson, P, 2026-Present
- (United States) Matt Sinatro, C, 1990–1992
- (Canada) Steve Sinclair, P, 1999
- (United States) Heathcliff Slocumb, P, 1997–1998
- (United States) Brick Smith, 1B, 1987–1988
- (United States) Carson Smith, P, 2015
- (United States) Joe Smith, P, 2021
- (United States) Mallex Smith, OF, 2019–2020
- (United States) Seth Smith, OF, 2015–2016
- (United States) Tommy Smith, OF, 1977
- (United States) Tyler Smith, SS, 2017
- (United States) Justin Smoak, 1B, 2010–2014
- (United States) Kirby Snead, P, 2024
- (United States) Ian Snell, P, 2009–2010
- (United States) Chris Snelling, OF, 2002, 2005–2006
- (United States) Collin Snider, P, 2024–2025
- (United States) Brian Snyder, P, 1985
- (Venezuela) Luis Sojo, 2B, 1994–1996
- (Colombia) Donovan Solano, 1B, 2025
- (Dominican Republic) Julio Solano, P, 1988–1989
- (Dominican Republic) Rafael Soriano, P, 2002–2006
- (United States) Paul Sorrento, 1B, 1996–1997
- (United States) Steven Souza Jr., OF, 2022
- (United States) Denard Span, OF, 2018
- (United States) Gabe Speier, P, 2023–Present
- (United States) Sean Spencer, P, 1999
- (United States) Scott Spiezio, IF, 2004–2005
- (Canada) Paul Spoljaric, P, 1997–1998
- (United States) Ed Sprague, 3B, 2001
- (United States) Ryne Stanek, P, 2024
- (United States) Leroy Stanton, OF, 1977–1978
- (United States) Mike T. Stanton, P, 1982–1985
- (United States) Denny Stark, P, 1999, 2001, 2009
- (United States) Drew Steckenrider, P, 2021–2022
- (United States) Bill Stein, IF, 1977–1980
- (United States) Randy Stein, P, 1979, 1981
- (United States) Bob Stinson, C, 1977–1980
- (United States) Bob Stoddard, P, 1981–1984
- (United States) Drew Storen, P, 2016
- (United States) Dee Strange-Gordon, 2B/OF, 2018–2020
- (United States) Doug Strange, IF, 1995–1996
- (United States) Hunter Strickland, P, 2019
- (United States) Jamal Strong, OF, 2003, 2005
- (United States) Steve Stroughter, OF, 1982
- (Venezuela) Eugenio Suárez, 3B, 2022–2023, 2025
- (Venezuela) José Suárez, P, 2026
- (Venezuela) Jesus Sucre, C, 2013–2016
- (Japan) **Ichiro Suzuki**, OF, 2001–2012, 2018–2019
- (Japan) Mac Suzuki, P, 1996, 1998–1999
- (United States) Dale Sveum, IF, 1994
- (United States) Russ Swan, P, 1990–1993
- (United States) Erik Swanson, P, 2019–2022
- (United States) Anthony Swarzak, P, 2019
- (United States) Brian Sweeney, P, 2003, 2010
- (United States) Mike Sweeney, DH, 2009–2010
- (United States) Devin Sweet, P, 2023
- (United States) Rick Sweet, C, 1982–1983
- (United States) Bill Swift, P, 1985–1986, 1988–1991, 1998

== T ==
- (Dominican Republic) Domingo Tapia, P, 2021
- (Puerto Rico) Danny Tartabull, OF, 1984–1986
- (Dominican Republic) Leody Taveras, OF, 2025
- (United States) Aaron Taylor, P, 2002–2004
- (United States) Chris Taylor, SS, 2014–2016
- (United States) Samad Taylor, 2B/OF, 2024–2025
- (United States) Terry Taylor, P, 1988
- (United States) Troy Taylor, P, 2024–Present
- (United States) Rowdy Tellez, 1B/DH, 2025
- (United States) Kanekoa Texeira, P, 2010
- (United States) Eric Thames, OF, 2012
- (Dominican Republic) Juan Then, P, 2023
- (United States) Bobby Thigpen, P, 1994
- (United States) Dillon Thomas, OF, 2021
- (United States) Gorman Thomas, OF, 1984–1986
- (United States) Justin Thomas, P, 2008
- (United States) Rhylan Thomas, OF, 2025
- (United States) Roy Thomas, P, 1983–1985, 1987
- (United States) Stan Thomas, P, 1977
- (United States) Matt Thornton, P, 2004–2005
- (United States) Trent Thornton, P, 2023–2025
- (United States) Gary Thurman, OF, 1995
- (United States) Mike Timlin, P, 1997–1998
- (United States) Ozzie Timmons, OF, 1999
- (United States) Lee Tinsley, OF, 1993, 1997
- (United States) Dave Tobik, P, 1985
- (United States) Jim Todd, P, 1978
- (United States) Brett Tomko, P, 2000–2001
- (United States) Justin Topa, P, 2023
- (Canada) Abraham Toro, UT, 2021–2022
- (Venezuela) Yorvit Torrealba, C, 2005
- (Dominican Republic) Salomón Torres, P, 1995–1997
- (Venezuela) Luis Torrens, C, 2020–2022, 2023
- (United States) Taylor Trammell, OF, 2021–2023
- (Dominican Republic) Carlos Triunfel, SS/2B, 2012–2013
- (United States) Mark Trumbo, OF, 2015
- (United States) Steve Trout, OF, 1988–1989
- (United States) Mike Trujillo, P, 1986–1987
- (United States) Matt Tuiasosopo, IF, 2008–2011
- (United States) Sam Tuivailala, P, 2018–2019
- (United States) Brian Turang, OF, 1993–1994
- (United States) Justin Turner, 1B, 2024
- (United States) Shane Turner, 3B, 1992
- (United States) Wayne Twitchell, P, 1979

== U ==
- (Venezuela) Luis Ugueto, 2B, 2002–2003
- (United States) Justin Upton, OF, 2022
- (Mexico) Luis Urías, 3B, 2024

== V ==
- (Venezuela) Luis Valbuena, 2B, 2008
- (Mexico) Ismael Valdéz, P, 2002
- (Dominican Republic) Wilson Valdéz, SS, 2005
- (United States) Danny Valencia, 3B, 2017
- (United States) Bobby Valentine, SS/OF, 1979
- (United States) Dave Valle, C, 1984–1993
- (United States) Ed Vande Berg, P, 1982–1985
- (Dominican Republic) Carlos Vargas, P, 2025–Present
- (United States) Jason Vargas, P, 2009–2012
- (United States) Anthony Varvaro, P, 2010
- (United States) Anthony Vasquez, P, 2011
- (Dominican Republic) Rafael Vásquez, P, 1979
- (Puerto Rico) Ramón Vázquez, IF, 2001
- (United States) Pat Venditte, P, 2016
- (United States) Will Vest, P, 2021
- (Puerto Rico) José Vidro, 2B, 2007–2008
- (Brazil) Thyago Vieira, P, 2017
- (United States) Ron Villone, P, 1995, 2004–2005
- (United States) Fernando Viña, 2B, 1993
- (United States) Nick Vincent, P, 2016–2018
- (United States) Zach Vincej, SS, 2018
- (Venezuela) Omar Vizquel, SS, 1989–1993
- (United States) Daniel Vogelbach, 1B, 2016–2020
- (United States) Jason Vosler, 3B, 2024
- (United States) Austin Voth, P, 2024

== W ==
- (United States) Matt Wagner, P, 1996
- (Canada) Dave Wainhouse, P, 1993
- (United States) Mike Walker, P, 1992
- (United States) Taijuan Walker, P, 2013–2016, 2020
- (United States) Gene Walter, P, 1988
- (United States) Donovan Walton, 2B, 2019–2022
- (United States) Reggie Walton, OF, 1980–1981
- (United States) Taylor Ward, OF, 2026-Present
- (United States) Adam Warren, P, 2018
- (United States) Art Warren, P, 2016
- (United States) Jarrod Washburn, P, 2006–2009
- (United States) Allen Watson, P, 1999
- (United States) Mark Watson, P, 2002
- (United States) Eric Weaver, P, 1999
- (United States) Jeff Weaver, P, 2007
- (United States) Jim Weaver, OF, 1987
- (United States) Luke Weaver, P, 2023
- (United States) Ryan Weber, P, 2021
- (United States) Rickie Weeks, IF/OF/DH, 2015
- (United States) Bob Wells, P, 1994–1998
- (United States) Casper Wells, OF, 2011–2012
- (United States) Jared Wells, P, 2008
- (United States) Rob Whalen, P, 2017–2018
- (United States) Gary Wheelock, P, 1977, 1980
- (United States) Evan White, 1B, 2020–2021
- (United States) Matt White, P, 2003
- (United States) Rick White, P, 2007
- (United States) Sean White, P, 2007, 2009–2010
- (United States) Mark Whiten, OF, 1996
- (United States) Chris Widger, C, 1995–1996, 2000
- (United States) Joe Wieland, P, 2016
- (United States) Cole Wilcox, P, 2026-Present
- (United States) Milt Wilcox, P, 1986
- (United States) Tom Wilhelmsen P, 2011–2015
- (United States) Brad Wilkerson, OF, 2008
- (United States) Rick Wilkins, C, 1997–1998
- (United States) Bill Wilkinson, P, 1985, 1987–1988
- (United States) Jerry Willard, C, 1994
- (United States) Randy Williams, P, 2004
- (United States) Taylor Williams, P, 2020
- (United States) Todd Williams, P, 1999
- (United States) Ben Williamson, 3B, 2025
- (United States) Mac Williamson, OF, 2019
- (United States) Frank Wills, P, 1985
- (United States) Dan Wilson, C, 1994–2005
- (United States) Glenn Wilson, OF, 1988
- (United States) Jack Wilson, SS, 2009–2011
- (United States) Jim Wilson, 1B, 1989
- (United States) Josh Wilson, IF, 2009–2010
- (United States) Marcus Wilson, OF, 2022
- (United States) Mike Wilson, OF, 2011
- (United States) Weston Wilson, UT, 2026-Present
- (United States) Will Wilson, IF, 2026-Present
- (United States) Jesse Winker, OF, 2022
- (United States) Randy Winn, OF, 2003–2005
- (United States) Patrick Wisdom, 3B/1B, 2026-Present
- (United States) Matt Wisler, P, 2019
- (United States) Bob Wolcott, P, 1995–1997
- (United States) Kolten Wong, 2B, 2023
- (United States) Bryan Woo, P, 2023–Present
- (United States) Jake Woods, P, 2006–2008
- (United States) Kerry Woodson, P, 1992
- (United States) Chris Woodward, IF, 2009–2010
- (United States) Jamey Wright, P, 2010–2011
- (United States) Mike Wright, P, 2019
- (United States) Ron Wright, DH, 2002

== Y ==
- (United States) Jimmy Yacabonis, P, 2020
- (United States) Steve Yeager, C, 1986
- (United States) Chris Young, P, 2014
- (United States) Cole Young, 2B/SS, 2025–Present
- (United States) Danny Young, P, 2022
- (United States) Matt Young, P, 1983–1986, 1990

== Z ==
- (United States) Daniel Zamora, P, 2021
- (United States) Seby Zavala, C, 2024
- (United States) Clint Zavaras, P, 1989
- (Canada) Jordan Zimmerman, P, 1999
- (United States) Richie Zisk, DH, 1981–1984
- (United States) Mike Zunino, C, 2013–2018
- (United States) Tony Zych, P, 2015–2017
