= 2002 Seattle Mariners season =

2002 Seattle Mariners
- League: American League
- Division: West
- Ballpark: T-Mobile Park (then known as Safeco Field)
- City: Seattle, Washington
- Record: 93–69 (.574)
- Divisional place: 3rd
- Owners: Hiroshi Yamauchi (represented by Howard Lincoln)
- General managers: Pat Gillick
- Managers: Lou Piniella
- Television: KSTW-TV 11; FSN Northwest
- Radio: KIRO 710 AM (Dave Niehaus, Jay Buhner, Ron Fairly, Dave Valle, Dave Henderson, Rick Rizzs)

The Seattle Mariners 2002 season was their 26th since the franchise creation. After their record 116 wins the previous year without a World Series appearance, they attempted for a third straight postseason appearance. They ended the season 93–69 (.574), but finished third in the American League West and missed the postseason. This season began a playoff drought that lasted for 20 seasons until 2022, at which point it was the longest in all of the four North American professional sports.

== Offseason ==
- December 7, 2001: Bret Boone was signed as a free agent with the Seattle Mariners.
- December 19, 2001: David Bell was signed as a free agent with the Seattle Mariners.
- January 25, 2002: David Bell was traded by the Seattle Mariners to the San Francisco Giants for Desi Relaford and cash.

== Regular season ==
On May 2, 2002, Mike Cameron hit four home runs in one game versus the White Sox.

=== Opening Day starters ===
- Bret Boone
- Mike Cameron
- Jeff Cirillo
- Freddy García
- Carlos Guillén
- Edgar Martínez
- Mark McLemore
- John Olerud
- Ichiro Suzuki
- Dan Wilson

=== Season standings ===
AL West
Team	W	L	Pct.	GB	Home	Road
Oakland Athletics	103	59	.636	—	54‍–‍27	49‍–‍32
Anaheim Angels	99	63	.611	4	54‍–‍27	45‍–‍36
Seattle Mariners	93	69	.574	10	48‍–‍33	45‍–‍36
Texas Rangers	72	90	.444	31	42‍–‍39	30‍–‍51

=== American League Wild Card ===
Division leaders
Team	W	L	Pct.
New York Yankees	103	58	.640
Minnesota Twins	94	67	.584
Oakland Athletics	103	59	.636

Wild Card team (Top team qualifies for postseason)
Team	W	L	Pct.	GB
Anaheim Angels	99	63	.611	—
Boston Red Sox	93	69	.574	6
Seattle Mariners	93	69	.574	6
Chicago White Sox	81	81	.500	18
Toronto Blue Jays	78	84	.481	21
Cleveland Indians	74	88	.457	25
Texas Rangers	72	90	.444	27
Baltimore Orioles	67	95	.414	32
Kansas City Royals	62	100	.383	37
Detroit Tigers	55	106	.342	43½
Tampa Bay Devil Rays	55	106	.342	43½

=== Record vs. opponents ===
2002 American League record Source: MLB Standings Grid – 2002
Team	ANA	BAL	BOS	CWS	CLE	DET	KC	MIN	NYY	OAK	SEA	TB	TEX	TOR	NL
Anaheim	—	7–2	3–4	6–3	6–3	8–1	6–3	4–5	3–4	9–11	9–10	8–1	12–7	7–2	11–7
Baltimore	2–7	—	6–13	3–4	1–5	2–4	7–0	5–1	6–13	4–5	5–4	10–9	3–6	4–15	9–9
Boston	4–3	13–6	—	2–4	5–4	5–4	4–2	3–3	9–10	6–3	4–5	16–3	4–3	13–6	5–13
Chicago	3–6	4–3	4–2	—	9–10	12–7	11–8	8–11	2–4	2–7	5–4	4–3	5–4	4–2	8–10
Cleveland	3–6	5–1	4–5	10–9	—	10–9	9–10	8–11	3–6	2–5	3–4	4–2	4–5	3–3	6–12
Detroit	1–8	4–2	4–5	7–12	9–10	—	9–10	4–14	1–8	1–6	2–5	2–4	5–4	0–6	6–12
Kansas City	3–6	0–7	2–4	8–11	10–9	10–9	—	5–14	1–5	1–8	3–6	4–2	7–2	3–4	5–13
Minnesota	5–4	1–5	3–3	11–8	11–8	14–4	14–5	—	0–6	3–6	5–4	5–2	6–3	6–1	10–8
New York	4–3	13–6	10–9	4–2	6–3	8–1	5–1	6–0	—	5–4	4–5	13–5	4–3	10–9	11–7
Oakland	11–9	5–4	3–6	7–2	5–2	6–1	8–1	6–3	4–5	—	8–11	8–1	13–6	3–6	16–2
Seattle	10–9	4–5	5–4	4–5	4–3	5–2	6–3	4–5	5–4	11–8	—	5–4	13–7	6–3	11–7
Tampa Bay	1–8	9–10	3–16	3–4	2–4	4–2	2–4	2–5	5–13	1–8	4–5	—	4–5	8–11	7–11
Texas	7–12	6–3	3–4	4–5	5–4	4–5	2–7	3–6	3–4	6–13	7–13	5–4	—	8–1	9–9
Toronto	2–7	15–4	6–13	2–4	3–3	6–0	4–3	1–6	9–10	6–3	3–6	11–8	1–8	—	9–9

Mariners vs. National League
Team	NL West		NL Central					
Team	COL	SDP	CHC	CIN	HOU	MIL	PIT	STL
Seattle	2–1	1–2	1–2	3–0	2–1	–	–	2–1

=== Roster ===
2002 Seattle Mariners
Roster
Pitchers: 48 Paul Abbott; 33 James Baldwin; 36 Doug Creek; 39 Brian Fitzgerald; 45 Ryan Franklin; 34 Freddy García; 54 John Halama; 17 Shigetoshi Hasegawa; 36 Justin Kaye; 40 Julio Mateo; 50 Jamie Moyer; 43 Jeff Nelson; 38 Joel Piñeiro; 53 Arthur Rhodes; 22 Kazuhiro Sasaki; 39 Rafael Soriano; 52 Aaron Taylor; 47 Ismael Valdez; 26 Mark Watson	Catchers: 10 Pat Borders; 13 Ben Davis; 6 Dan Wilson; Infielders: 29 Bret Boone; 9 Jeff Cirillo; 8 Carlos Guillén; 30 José Offerman; 5 John Olerud; 25 Desi Relaford; 23 Luis Ugueto	Outfielders: 16 Willie Bloomquist; 44 Mike Cameron; 1 Charles Gipson; 18 Gene Kingsale; 4 Mark McLemore; 20 Scott Podsednik; 21 Rubén Sierra; 32 Chris Snelling; 51 Ichiro Suzuki; Other batters: 11 Edgar Martínez; 26 Ron Wright	Manager: 14 Lou Piniella; Coaches: 7 John McLaren; 12 John Moses; 31 Dave Myers; 27 Gerald Perry; 35 Bryan Price; 15 Matt Sinatro

== Player stats ==
=== Batting ===
==== Starters by position ====
Note: Pos = Position; G = Games played; AB = At bats; H = Hits; Avg. = Batting average; HR = Home runs; RBI = Runs batted in

Pos	Player	G	AB	H	Avg.	HR	RBI
C	Dan Wilson	115	359	106	.295	6	44
1B	John Olerud	154	553	166	.300	22	102
2B	Bret Boone	155	608	169	.278	24	107
SS	Carlos Guillén	134	475	124	.261	9	56
3B	Jeff Cirillo	146	485	121	.249	6	54
LF	Mark McLemore	104	337	91	.270	7	41
CF	Mike Cameron	158	545	130	.239	25	80
RF	Ichiro Suzuki	157	647	208	.321	8	51
DH	Edgar Martínez	97	328	91	.277	15	59

==== Other batters ====
Note: G = Games played; AB = At bats; H = Hits; Avg. = Batting average; HR = Home runs; RBI = Runs batted in

Player	G	AB	H	Avg.	HR	RBI
Rubén Sierra	122	419	113	.270	13	60
Desi Relaford	112	329	88	.267	6	43
Ben Davis	80	228	59	.259	7	43
Charles Gipson	79	72	17	.236	0	8
José Offerman	29	47	11	.234	1	4
Willie Bloomquist	12	33	15	.455	0	7
Chris Snelling	8	27	4	.148	1	3
Luis Ugueto	62	23	5	.217	1	1
Scott Podsednik	14	20	4	.200	1	5
Pat Borders	4	4	2	.500	0	1
Gene Kingsale	2	3	2	.667	0	0
Ron Wright	1	3	0	.000	0	0

=== Pitching ===
==== Starting pitchers ====
Note: G = Games pitched; IP = Innings pitched; W = Wins; L = Losses; ERA = Earned run average; SO = Strikeouts

Player	G	IP	W	L	ERA	SO
Jamie Moyer	34	230.2	13	8	3.32	147
Freddy García	34	223.2	16	10	4.39	181
Joel Piñeiro	37	194.1	14	7	3.24	136
James Baldwin	30	150.0	7	10	5.28	88
Ismael Valdéz	8	49.1	2	3	4.93	27
Rafael Soriano	10	47.1	0	3	4.56	32

==== Other pitchers ====
Note: G = Games pitched; IP = Innings pitched; W = Wins; L = Losses; ERA = Earned run average; SO = Strikeouts

Player	G	IP	W	L	ERA	SO
Ryan Franklin	41	118.2	7	5	4.02	65
John Halama	31	101.0	6	5	3.56	70
Paul Abbott	7	26.1	1	3	11.96	22

===== Relief pitchers =====
Note: G = Games pitched; W = Wins; L = Losses; SV = Saves; ERA = Earned run average; SO = Strikeouts

Player	G	W	L	SV	ERA	SO
Kazuhiro Sasaki	61	4	5	37	2.52	73
Arthur Rhodes	66	10	4	2	2.33	81
Shigetoshi Hasegawa	53	8	3	1	3.20	39
Jeff Nelson	41	3	2	2	3.94	55
Doug Creek	23	1	1	0	4.91	19
Julio Mateo	12	0	0	0	4.29	15
Brian Fitzgerald	6	0	0	0	8.53	3
Aaron Taylor	5	0	0	0	9.00	6
Mark Watson	3	1	0	0	18.00	1
Justin Kaye	3	0	0	0	12.00	3

== Farm system ==
Level	Team	League	Manager
AAA	Tacoma Rainiers	Pacific Coast League	Dan Rohn
AA	San Antonio Missions	Texas League	Dave Brundage
A	San Bernardino Stampede	California League	Daren Brown
A	Wisconsin Timber Rattlers	Midwest League	Gary Thurman
A-Short Season	Everett AquaSox	Northwest League	Omer Muñoz and Roger Hansen
Rookie	AZL Mariners	Arizona League	Darrin Garner

LEAGUE CHAMPIONS: San Antonio

== Major League Baseball draft ==
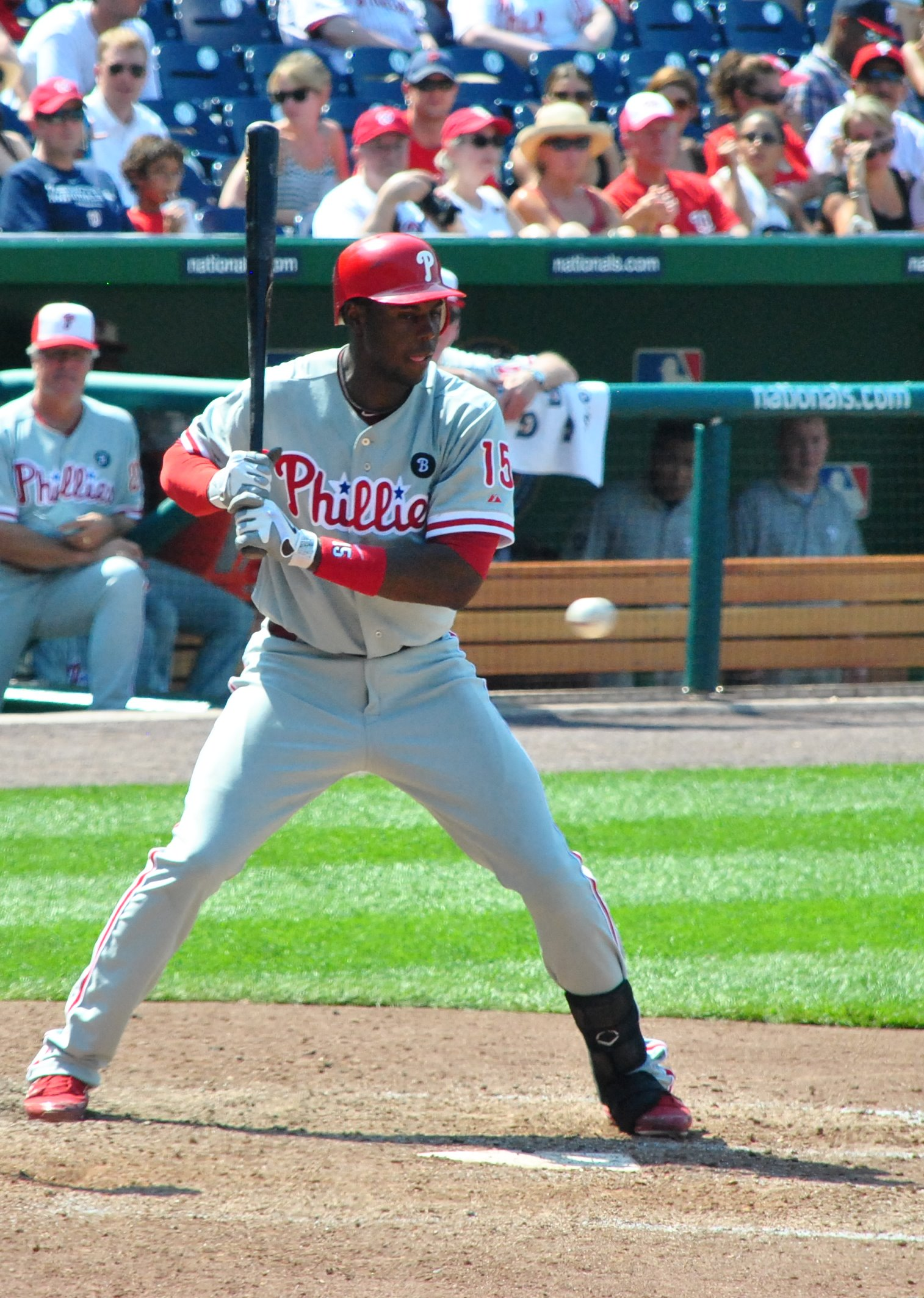
2002 Seattle Mariners draft picks
John Mayberry, Jr. (pictured) was the Mariners first round pick in 2002.
Information
**Owner**	Nintendo of America
**General Manager(s)**	Pat Gillick
**Manager(s)**	Lou Piniella
**First pick**	John Mayberry, Jr.
**Draft positions**	28th
**Number of selections**	50
Links
**Results**	Baseball-Reference
**Official Site**	The Official Site of the Seattle Mariners
**Years**	2001 • 2002 • 2003

The following is a list of 2002 Seattle Mariners draft picks. The Mariners took part in the June regular draft, also known as the Rule 4 draft. The Mariners made 50 selections in the 2002 draft, the first being outfielder John Mayberry, Jr. in the first round. In all, the Mariners selected 23 pitchers, 12 outfielders, 5 catchers, 3 second basemen, 3 shortstops, 3 third basemen, 3 second basemen, and 1 first baseman.

=== Draft ===
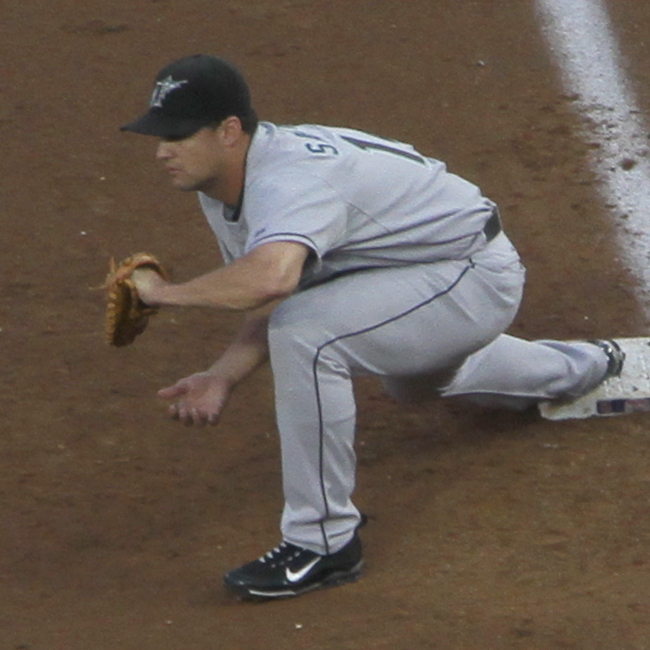
Gaby Sánchez was selected in the 15th round of the 2002 draft by the Mariners.

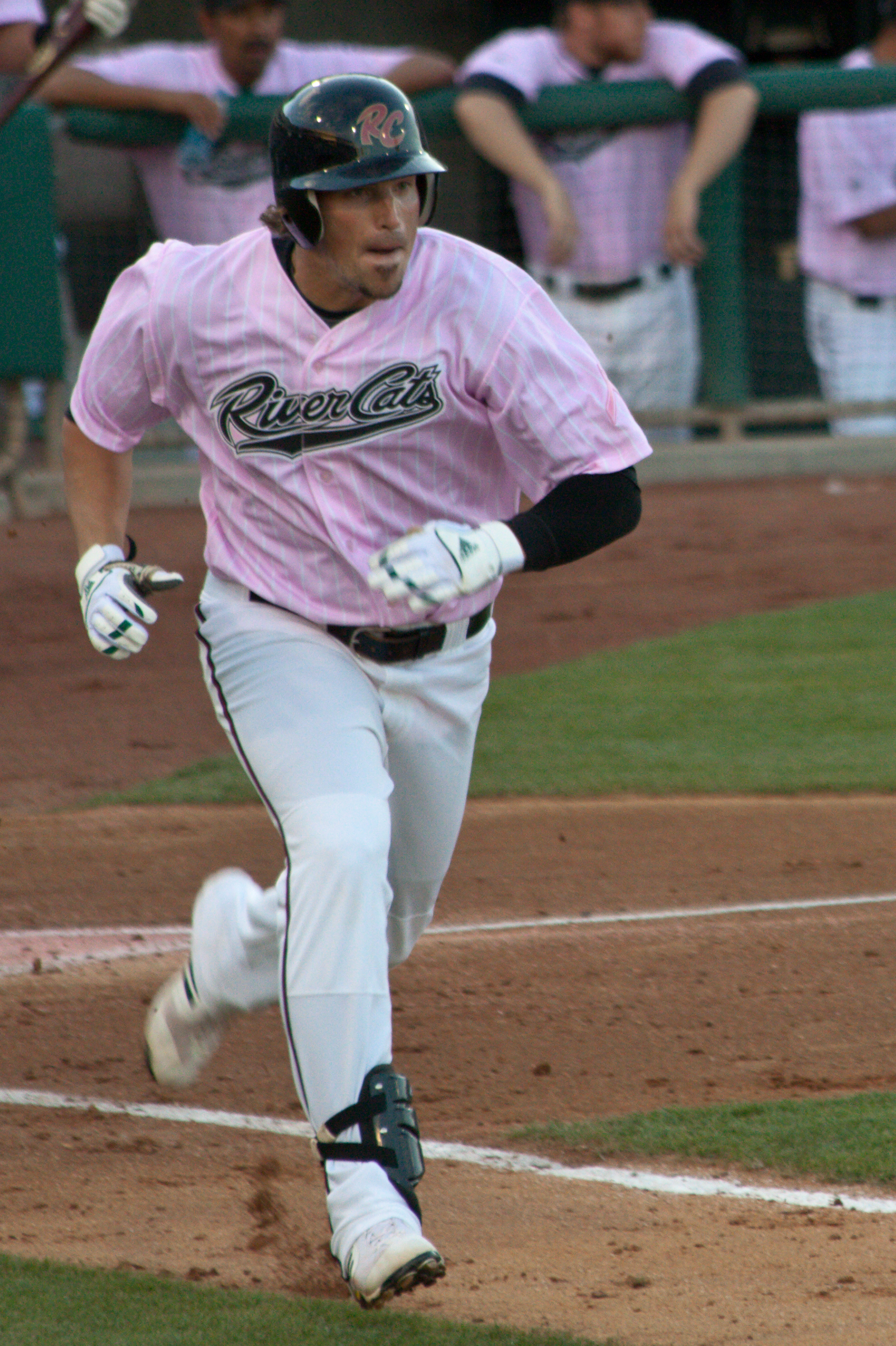
With the 700th pick of the 2002 draft the Mariners selected Travis Buck.

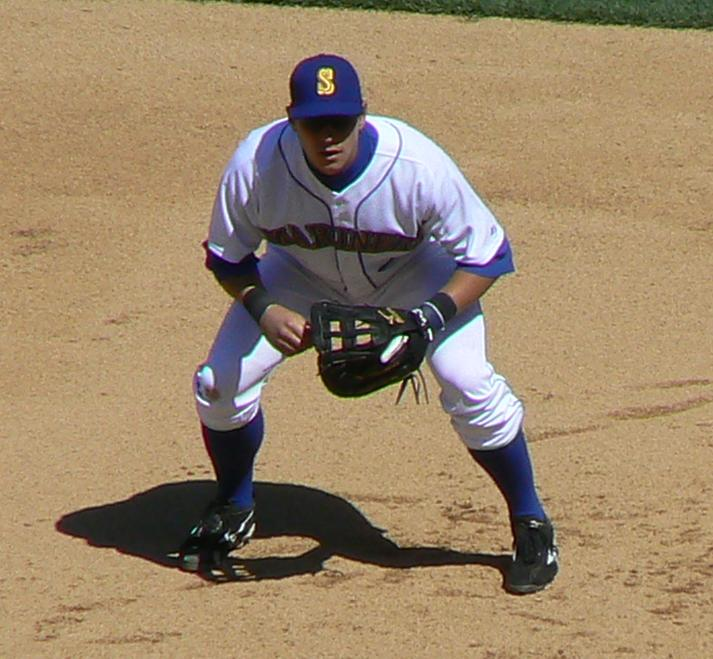
In the 39th round the Mariners selected Bryan LaHair.

=== Key ===
Round (Pick)	Indicates the round and pick the player was drafted
Position	Indicates the secondary/collegiate position at which the player was drafted, rather than the professional position the player may have gone on to play
**Bold**	Indicates the player signed with the Mariners
Italics	Indicates the player did not sign with the Mariners
*	Indicates the player made an appearance in Major League Baseball

=== Table ===
Round (Pick)	Name	Position	School	Source
1 (28)	John Mayberry, Jr.	Outfielder	Rockhurst High School	
2 (69)	**Josh Womack**	Outfielder	Crawford High School	
3 (100)	Eddy Martinez-Estevez	Outfielder	Westminster Christian School	
4 (130)	**Randall Frye**	Right-handed pitcher	Lake Orion High School	
5 (160)	**Kendall Bergdall**	Left-handed pitcher	Cimarron High School	
6 (190)	**Troy Cate**	Left-handed pitcher	Brigham Young University–Idaho	
7 (220)	**Evel Bastida-Martinez**	Second baseman	None	
8 (250)	**Brandon Perry**	Left-handed pitcher	Graham High School	
9 (280)	**Terry Forbes**	Right-handed pitcher	Auburn Drive High School	
10 (310)	**Brian Stitt**	Right-handed pitcher	Indian River State College	
11 (340)	**Jared Thomas**	Left-handed pitcher	Oakland University	
12 (370)	**Matt Hagen**	Third baseman	Liberty University	
13 (400)	**T. A. Fulmer**	Right-handed pitcher	The Citadel	
14 (430)	**Theiborh Almanzar**	Catcher	Bronx Community College	
15 (460)	Gaby Sánchez	Third baseman	Miami Brito High School	
16 (490)	**Ryan Leaist**	Right-handed pitcher	Montreat College	
17 (520)	**Corey Harrington**	Shortstop	New Mexico State University	
18 (550)	**Gary Harris**	Outfielder	Georgia College & State University	
19 (580)	**Chris Kroski**	Catcher	St. Petersburg College	
20 (610)	**David Viane**	Right-handed pitcher	Oakland University	
21 (640)	**Erik Blakeley**	Second baseman	Indiana University	
22 (670)	**Hunter Brown**	Third baseman	Rice University	
23 (700)	Travis Buck	Shortstop	Richland High School	
24 (730)	**Johnnie Bassham**	Left-handed pitcher	Grayson County College	
25 (760)	Cory Vanderhook	Catcher	Edison High School	
26 (790)	**David Bernat**	Right-handed pitcher	South Miami High School	
27 (820)	**Royce Dickerson**	Outfielder	Central High School	
28 (850)	**Vance Hall**	Left-handed pitcher	Allderdice High School	
29 (880)	**Michael Nesbitt**	Outfielder	Los Angeles Pierce College	
30 (910)	**T. J. Bohn**	Outfielder	Bellevue University	
31 (940)	Clayton Stewart	Right-handed pitcher	San Jacinto College	
32 (970)	Dane Awana	Left-handed pitcher	Waianae High School	
33 (1000)	**Kile Patrick**	Right-handed pitcher	Apopka High School	
34 (1030)	**Brady Burrill**	Catcher	Michigan State University	
35 (1060)	**Patrick Pfeiffer**	Right-handed pitcher	Brentwood School	
36 (1090)	**Jermaine Smith**	Shortstop	King High School	
37 (1120)	**Brad Rose**	Right-handed pitcher	Walters State Community College	
38 (1150)	**Deandre Green**	Outfielder	Encinal High School	
39 (1180)	**Bryan LaHair**	Outfielder	St. Petersburg College	
40 (1210)	**Josh Cooper**	Right-handed pitcher	South High School	
41 (1240)	Andrew Edwards	Right-handed pitcher	Florida International University	
42 (1270)	Brandon Jones	First baseman	Grayson County College	
43 (1299)	**Adam Pernasilici**	Outfielder	St. Anne High School	
44 (1327)	**Omar Borges**	Outfielder	Miami Brito High School	
45 (1354)	**Raymond Lockhart**	Outfielder	Compton High School	
46 (1380)	**Roberto Mena**	Second baseman	Pedro Falú Orellano High School	
47 (1406)	Jason Godin	Right-handed pitcher	North Stafford High School	
48 (1432)	**Cardoza Tucker**	Right-handed pitcher	Bullard High School	
49 (1457)	Justin Ruchti	Catcher	San Jacinto College	
50 (1481)	**Oliver Arias**	Right-handed pitcher	Community College of Rhode Island	
