= 2000 Anaheim Angels season =

Major League Baseball season

2000 Anaheim Angels
- Patch commemorating the Angels' 40th season
- League: American League
- Division: West
- Ballpark: Edison International Field of Anaheim
- City: Anaheim, California
- Record: 82–80 (.506)
- Divisional place: 3rd
- Owner: The Walt Disney Company
- General manager: Bill Stoneman
- Manager: Mike Scioscia
- Television: Fox Sports Net West; KCAL-9 •Rex Hudler, Steve Physioc
- Radio: KLAC (AM 570) •Mario Impemba, Daron Sutton; XPRS (Spanish) •José Tolentino, Ivan Lara
- Stats: ESPN.com; Baseball Reference

The 2000 Anaheim Angels season was the 40th season of the Anaheim Angels franchise in the American League, the 35th in Anaheim, and their 35th season playing their home games at Edison International Field of Anaheim. The Angels finished third in the American League West with a record of 82 wins and 80 losses.

The Angels had an extremely powerful offense, with five players (Garret Anderson, Darin Erstad, Troy Glaus, Tim Salmon, and Mo Vaughn) hitting at least 25 homers and driving in 97 runs. Glaus led the AL in HRs, and Erstad had the most hits on his way to a .355 batting average. However, the pitching was very inconsistent. Reliever Shigetoshi Hasegawa led the team with 10 wins. Scott Schoeneweis led all starting pitchers in innings pitched with 170 and also led all starters (qualifying for ERA title) with a 5.45 ERA.

== Offseason ==
- November 17, 1999: The Angels hired Mike Scioscia as their new manager.
- January 11, 2000: Scott Spiezio was signed as a free agent with the Anaheim Angels.
- March 23, 2000: Kent Bottenfield was traded by the St. Louis Cardinals with Adam Kennedy to the Anaheim Angels for Jim Edmonds.

== Regular season ==
=== Notable transactions ===
- July 29, 2000: Kent Bottenfield was traded by the Anaheim Angels to the Philadelphia Phillies for Ron Gant.

=== Season standings ===
AL West
Team	W	L	Pct.	GB	Home	Road
Oakland Athletics	91	70	.565	—	47‍–‍34	44‍–‍36
Seattle Mariners	91	71	.562	½	47‍–‍34	44‍–‍37
Anaheim Angels	82	80	.506	9½	46‍–‍35	36‍–‍45
Texas Rangers	71	91	.438	20½	42‍–‍39	29‍–‍52

=== Record vs. opponents ===
2000 American League record Source: MLB Standings Grid – 2000
Team	ANA	BAL	BOS	CWS	CLE	DET	KC	MIN	NYY	OAK	SEA	TB	TEX	TOR	NL
Anaheim	—	7–5	5–4	4–6	3–6	5–5	6–6	7–3	5–5	5–8	5–8	6–6	7–5	5–7	12–6
Baltimore	5–7	—	5–7	4–6	5–4	6–4	3–7	6–3	5–7	4–8	3–7	8–5	6–6	7–6	7–11
Boston	4–5	7–5	—	7–5	6–6	7–5	4–6	8–2	6–7	5–5	5–5	6–6	7–3	4–8	9–9
Chicago	6–4	6–4	5–7	—	8–5	9–3	5–7	7–5	8–4	6–3	7–5	6–4	5–5	5–5	12–6
Cleveland	6–3	4–5	6–6	5–8	—	6–7	5–7	5–8	5–5	6–6	7–2	8–2	6–4	8–4	13–5
Detroit	5–5	4–6	5–7	3–9	7–6	—	5–7	7–6	8–4	6–4	7–2	4–5	5–5	3–9	10–8
Kansas City	6–6	7–3	6–4	7–5	7–5	7–5	—	7–5	2–8	4–8	4–8	5–5	3–7	4–6	8–10
Minnesota	3–7	3–6	2–8	5–7	8–5	6–7	5–7	—	5–5	5–7	3–9	4–6	8–4	5–4	7–11
New York	5–5	7–5	7–6	4–8	5–5	4–8	8–2	5–5	—	6–3	4–6	6–6	10–2	5–7	11–6
Oakland	8–5	8–4	5–5	3–6	6–6	4–6	8–4	7–5	3–6	—	9–4	7–2	5–7	7–3	11–7
Seattle	8–5	7–3	5–5	5–7	2–7	2–7	8–4	9–3	6–4	4–9	—	9–3	7–5	8–2	11–7
Tampa Bay	6–6	5–8	6–6	4–6	2–8	5–4	5–5	6–4	6–6	2–7	3–9	—	5–7	5–7	9–9
Texas	5–7	6–6	3–7	5–5	4–6	5–5	7–3	4–8	2–10	7–5	5–7	7–5	—	4–6	7–11
Toronto	7–5	6–7	8–4	5–5	4–8	9–3	6–4	4–5	7–5	3–7	2–8	7–5	6–4	—	9–9

=== Roster ===
2000 Anaheim Angels
Roster
Pitchers: 18 Juan Alvarez; 41 Tim Belcher; 37 Kent Bottenfield; 45 Brian Cooper; 19 Jason Dickson; 35 Seth Etherton; 27 Mike Fyhrie; 21 Shigetoshi Hasegawa; 44 Ken Hill; 53 Brett Hinchliffe; 65 Mike Holtz; 33 Scott Karl; 43 Al Levine; 47 Kent Mercker; 36 Ramón Ortiz; 40 Troy Percival; 34 Mark Petkovsek; 58 Lou Pote; 60 Scott Schoeneweis; 54 Derrick Turnbow; 39 Bryan Ward; 56 Jarrod Washburn; 28 Eric Weaver; 57 Ben Weber; 32 Matt Wise	Catchers: 5,1 Bengie Molina; 6 Matt Walbeck; 76 Shawn Wooten; Infielders: 8 Justin Baughman; 9 Gary DiSarcina; 20 Trent Durrington; 10 Benji Gil; 25 Troy Glaus; 1,46 Keith Johnson; 2 Adam Kennedy; 39 Keith Luuloa; 23 Scott Spiezio; 38 Kevin Stocker; 42 Mo Vaughn	Outfielders: 16 Garret Anderson; 22 Edgard Clemente; 17 Darin Erstad; 5 Ron Gant; 3 Orlando Palmeiro; 15 Tim Salmon	Manager: 14 Mike Scioscia; Coaches: 24 Bud Black (Pitching); 7 Mickey Hatcher (Hitting); 4 Alfredo Griffin (First Base); 70 Joe Maddon (Bench); 13 Bobby Ramos (Bullpen); 12 Ron Roenicke (Third Base)

== Player stats ==
= Indicates team leader

= Indicates league leader

=== Batting ===
==== Starters by position ====
Note: Pos = Position; G = Games played; AB = At bats; H = Hits; Avg. = Batting average; HR = Home runs; RBI = Runs batted in

Pos	Player	G	AB	H	Avg.	HR	RBI
CF	Garret Anderson	159	647	185	.286	35	117
LF	Darin Erstad	157	676	240	.355	25	100
SS	Benji Gil	110	301	72	.239	6	23
3B	Troy Glaus	159	563	160	.284	47	102
2B	Adam Kennedy	156	598	159	.266	9	72
C	Bengie Molina	130	473	133	.281	14	71
RF	Tim Salmon	158	568	165	.290	34	97
DH	Scott Spiezio	123	297	72	.242	17	49
1B	Mo Vaughn	161	614	167	.272	36	117

==== Other batters ====
Note: G = Games played; AB = At bats; H = Hits; Avg. = Batting average; HR = Home runs; RBI = Runs batted in

Player	G	AB	H	Avg.	HR	RBI
Orlando Palmeiro	108	243	73	.300	0	25
Kevin Stocker	70	229	45	.197	0	16
Matt Walbeck	47	146	29	.199	6	12
Ron Gant	34	82	19	.232	6	16
Edgard Clemente	46	78	17	.218	0	5
Gary Disarcina	12	38	15	.395	1	11
Justin Baughman	16	22	5	.227	0	0
Keith Luuloa	6	18	6	.333	0	0
Shawn Wooten	7	9	5	.556	0	1
Keith Johnson	6	4	2	.500	0	0
Trent Durrington	4	3	0	.000	0	0

=== Pitching ===
==== Starting pitchers ====
Note: G = Games pitched; IP = Innings pitched; W = Wins; L = Losses; ERA = Earned run average; SO = Strikeouts

Player	G	IP	W	L	ERA	SO
Scott Schoeneweis	27	170.0	7	10	5.45	78
Kent Bottenfield	21	127.2	7	8	5.71	75
Ramón Ortiz	18	111.1	8	6	5.09	73
Brian Cooper	15	87.0	4	8	5.90	36
Jarrod Washburn	14	84.1	7	2	3.74	49
Ken Hill	16	78.2	5	7	6.52	50
Seth Etherton	11	60.1	5	1	5.52	32
Tim Belcher	9	40.2	4	5	6.86	22
Matt Wise	8	37.1	3	3	5.54	20
Jason Dickson	6	28.0	2	2	6.11	18

==== Other pitchers ====
Note: G = Games pitched; IP = Innings pitched; W = Wins; L = Losses; ERA = Earned run average; SO = Strikeouts

Player	G	IP	W	L	ERA	SO
Kent Mercker	21	48.1	1	3	6.52	30
Scott Karl	6	21.2	2	2	6.65	9

===== Relief pitchers =====
Note: G = Games pitched; W = Wins; L = Losses; SV = Saves; ERA = Earned run average; SO = Strikeouts

Player	G	W	L	SV	ERA	SO
Troy Percival	54	5	5	32	4.50	49
Shigetoshi Hasegawa	66	10	5	9	3.48	59
Mark Petkovsek	64	4	2	2	4.33	31
Mike Holtz	61	3	4	0	5.05	40
Al Levine	51	3	4	2	3.87	42
Mike Fyhrie	32	0	0	0	2.39	43
Lou Pote	32	1	1	1	3.40	44
Derrick Turnbow	24	0	0	0	4.74	25
Eric Weaver	17	0	2	0	6.87	8
Juan Alvarez	11	0	0	0	13.50	2
Ben Weber	10	1	0	0	1.84	8
Bryan Ward	7	0	0	0	5.63	3
Brett Hinchliffe	2	0	0	0	5.40	0

== Awards and league leaders ==
Darin Erstad

- All-Star
- AL Gold Glove (OF)
- AL Silver Slugger Award (OF)
- AL leader in hits (240)
- #2 in AL in batting average (.355)
- #3 in AL in runs scored (121)

Troy Glaus

- All-Star
- AL Silver Slugger Award (3B)
- AL leader in home runs (47)
- #5 in AL in runs scored (120)

== Farm system ==
Level	Team	League	Manager
AAA	Edmonton Trappers	Pacific Coast League	Garry Templeton
AA	Erie SeaWolves	Eastern League	Don Wakamatsu
A	Lake Elsinore Storm	California League	Mario Mendoza
A	Cedar Rapids Kernels	Midwest League	Mitch Seoane and Tyrone Boykin
A-Short Season	Boise Hawks	Northwest League	Tom Kotchman
Rookie	Butte Copper Kings	Pioneer League	Joe Urso

Records
Preceded by 1999	Anaheim Angels seasons 2000	Succeeded by 2001
