= Keith Johnson (baseball) =

American baseball player (born 1971)

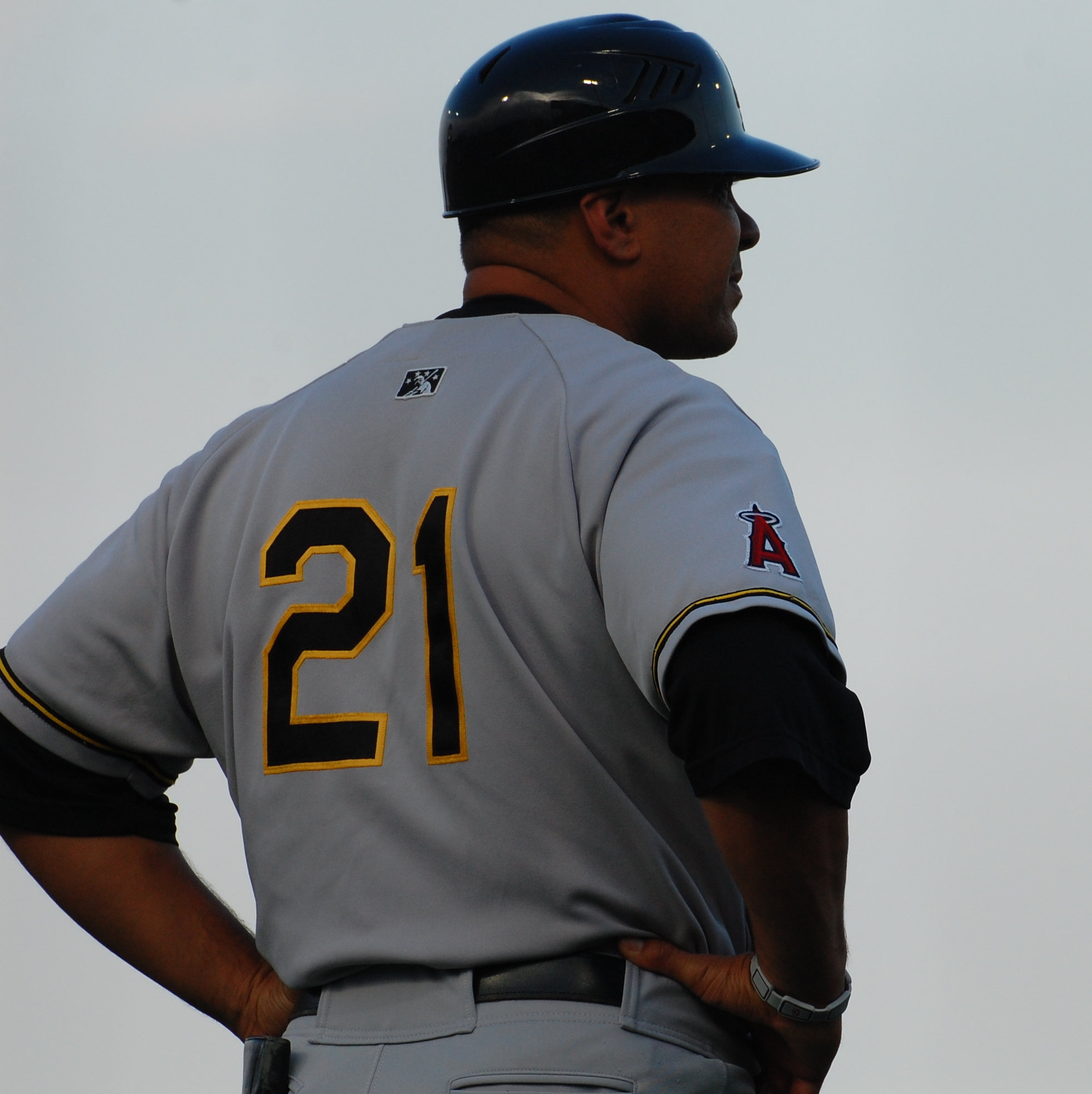
- Johnson with the Salt Lake Bees in 2012

Los Angeles Angels – No. 89
- Infielder / Coach
- Born: April 17, 1971 (age 55); Hanford, California, U.S.
- Batted: Right Threw: Right

MLB debut
- April 17, 2000, for the Anaheim Angels

Last MLB appearance
- August 9, 2000, for the Anaheim Angels

MLB statistics
- Batting average: .500
- Home runs: 0
- Runs batted in: 0
- Stats at Baseball Reference

Teams
- As player: Anaheim Angels (2000); As coach: Los Angeles Angels (2018); Miami Marlins (2020–2022); Los Angeles Angels (2026–present)

Keith Johnson (born April 17, 1971) is an American former professional baseball infielder and current third base coach for the Los Angeles Angels of Major League Baseball (MLB). Johnson played one season in MLB, with the Angels in 2000. Since his playing career, he has continued to work in baseball as a coach and manager.

== Biography ==
Johnson played professionally from 1992 though 2003 as an infielder, primarily for the Los Angeles Dodgers organization. He first reached the Triple-A level in 1996. In 12 minor league season, he appeared in 1265 games while compiling a .264 batting average with 118 home runs and 600 runs batted in (RBI). Johnson played six games in MLB, all for the 2000 Anaheim Angels, batting 2-for-4 (.500).

Johnson became a minor-league manager in the farm system of the Los Angeles Angels in 2008, when he was named skipper of the Cedar Rapids Kernels of the Single-A Midwest League. The following two seasons, Johnson managed the Rancho Cucamonga Quakes of the Single-A California League, winning the 2010 league championship, before his promotion to manager of the 2011 Salt Lake Bees of the Triple-A Pacific Coast League on December 7, 2010. Johnson worked in Salt Lake until 2015, when he was promoted to a minor league scout for the Angels while Dave Anderson took over his managing duties for the year. After the 2015 season, Johnson returned to his managerial duties in Salt Lake. In August 2018, the Angels promoted him to their major league staff as an infield coach; Eric Chavez succeeded him as manager of the Bees.

Johnson was named as manager for the Triple-A New Orleans Baby Cakes of the Miami Marlins organization for the 2019 season. He was named first base coach of the Marlins prior to the 2021 season.

On February 16, 2023 it was announced that Johnson would return to the Salt Lake Bees for a third stint as manager. On November 12, 2025, the Angels added Johnson to their staff as their third base coach.
