= Ed Olwine =

American baseball player (born 1958)

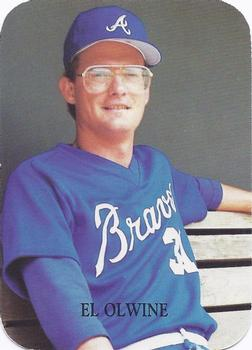
- Pitcher
- Born: May 28, 1958 (age 68); Greenville, Ohio, U.S.
- Batted: Right Threw: Left

MLB debut
- June 2, 1986, for the Atlanta Braves

Last MLB appearance
- October 2, 1988, for the Atlanta Braves

MLB statistics
- Win–loss record: 0–1
- Earned run average: 4.52
- Strikeouts: 54
- Stats at Baseball Reference

Teams
- Atlanta Braves (1986–1988)

Edward R. Olwine (born May 28, 1958) is an American former professional baseball pitcher. He played in Major League Baseball for the Atlanta Braves from 1986 to 1988.

== Amateur career ==
Olwine played college baseball for Morehead State University. In 1978 and 1979, he played collegiate summer baseball with the Hyannis Mets of the Cape Cod Baseball League, where he was the winning pitcher in the league's 1979 all-star game at Fenway Park, and helped Hyannis win the league championship in both seasons.

== Professional career ==
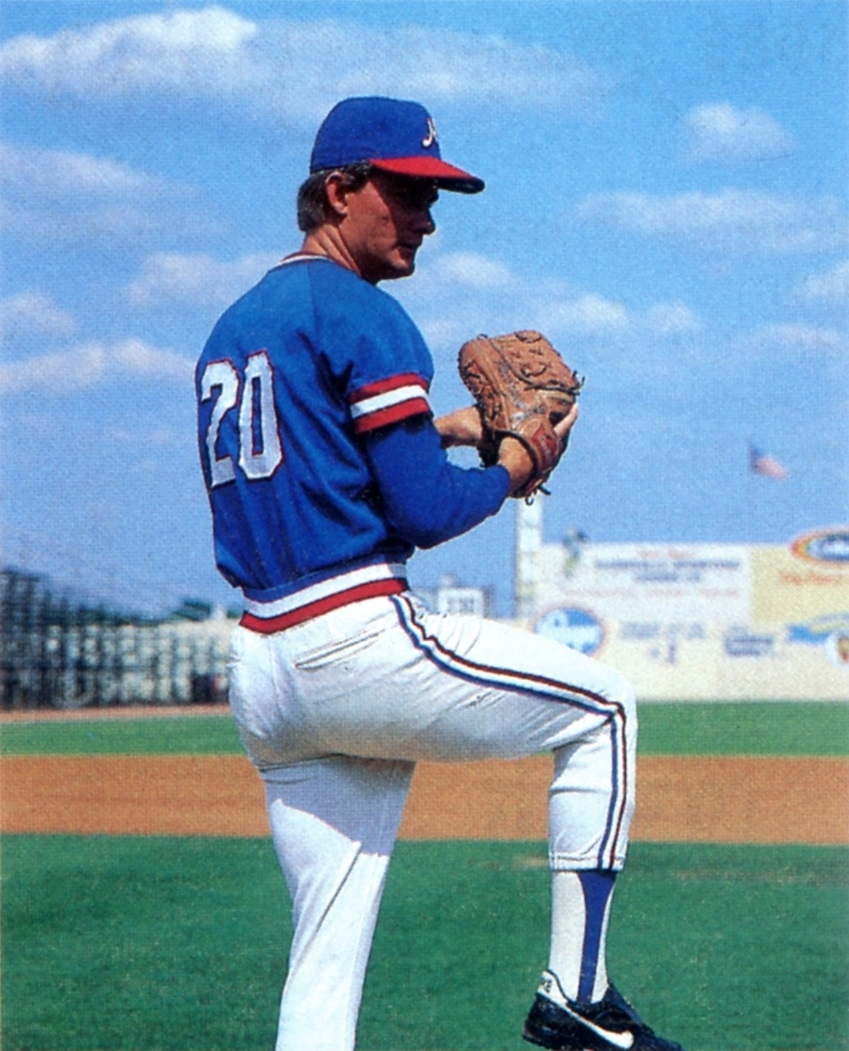
Olwine with the Nashville Sounds in 1983

He was signed by the New York Yankees as an amateur free agent in 1980. Olwine played his first professional season with their Rookie league Paintsville Yankees, Class A (Short Season) Oneonta Yankees, and Class A-Advanced Fort Lauderdale Yankees in 1980, and his last season with the Braves' Triple-A unit, the Richmond Braves, in 1988.

Olwine shares the major league baseball record with Juan Alvarez for most games pitched without a win, at 80.
