= Brett Hinchliffe =

American baseball player (born 1974)

- Pitcher
- Born: July 21, 1974 (age 51); Detroit, Michigan, U.S.
- Batted: Right Threw: Right

MLB debut
- April 5, 1999, for the Seattle Mariners

Last MLB appearance
- April 26, 2001, for the New York Mets

MLB statistics
- Win–loss record: 0–5
- Earned run average: 10.22
- Strikeouts: 16
- Stats at Baseball Reference

Teams
- Seattle Mariners (1999); Anaheim Angels (2000); New York Mets (2001)

Brett Hinchliffe (born July 21, 1974) is an American former professional baseball pitcher. He pitched in Major League Baseball (MLB) from 1999 to 2001. He was born with a genetic condition called syndactylism, wherein at least two digits are fused together. The middle finger of his left hand was amputated as a child, and the bone was inserted into his thumb.

== Seattle Mariners ==
The Seattle Mariners selected Hinchliffe out of Bishop Gallagher High School in Detroit, Michigan in the 16th round of the 1992 MLB draft, and spent most of his ten-year professional career in their farm system. On June 28, 1994, he threw a Maddux, an 84-pitch no-hitter for the Appleton Foxes in a 13–0 win. He led Appleton in wins, strikeouts, and innings pitched that season. During spring training in 1998, he suffered a sprained ankle and food poisoning and had laser eye surgery.

He made his MLB debut on April 5, 1999 against the Chicago White Sox at the Kingdome, pitching three innings and allowing two earned runs. His first major league start came on April 18 against the Anaheim Angels. After Hinchliffe hit Troy Glaus with a pitch in the first inning, Angels starter Steve Sparks retaliated on Ken Griffey Jr. in the third inning. When Glaus led off the fourth with a home run, Hinchliffe then hit Todd Greene with a pitch, inciting a bench-clearing brawl. Hinchliffe and Greene were ejected from the game. Hinchliffe was suspended three games, not missing a start, and fined, though his teammates paid his fine.

Hinchliffe made seven appearances, as both a starter and reliever, compiling a 0–2 record and 11.29 earned run average (ERA) before being demoted to the Mariners' Pacific Coast League (PCL) affiliate, the Tacoma Rainiers mid-May. Hinchliffe went 9–7 with a 5.15 ERA as a starting pitcher at Tacoma to earn a September call-up back to Seattle. He made four appearances upon his return, going 0–2 with a 5.11 ERA. The Mariners released him in January 2000. Griffey later said the team should have tried to trade Hinchliffe.

== Anaheim Angels ==
Hinchliffe became teammates with Glaus on the Angels shortly afterwards. He appeared in back-to-back games against the Kansas City Royals on May 20 and May 21, but spent the rest of the 2000 season in the PCL. He went 2–3 with a 3.80 ERA mostly as a reliever with the Edmonton Trappers before being dealt with Keith Luuloa to the Chicago Cubs for Chris Hatcher, Mike Heathcott and Brett King. Assigned to the Cubs' PCL team, the Iowa Cubs, Hinchliffe went 2–0 with a 2.81 ERA. He elected free agency after the season.

== New York Mets ==
Hinchliffe signed with the New York Mets on December 5, 2000. He made one emergency start with the Mets in place of an injured Al Leiter, allowing a third inning grand slam to the Milwaukee Brewers' Tyler Houston. Houston's home run was followed by a solo shot by Angel Echevarria. Following a single by Henry Blanco, he was lifted without recording an out that inning, taking the loss. He also pitched in 11 games for the Triple-A Norfolk Tides.
