= Justin Kaye =

American baseball player (born 1976)

- Relief pitcher
- Born: June 9, 1976 (age 49); Fort Lauderdale, Florida, U.S.
- Batted: Right Threw: Right

MLB debut
- May 9, 2002, for the Seattle Mariners

Last MLB appearance
- May 16, 2002, for the Seattle Mariners

MLB statistics
- Win–loss record: 0–0
- Earned run average: 12.00
- Strikeouts: 3
- Stats at Baseball Reference

Teams
- Seattle Mariners (2002)

Justin Malcolm Kaye (born June 9, 1976) is an American former pitcher in Major League Baseball who played one season for the Seattle Mariners (2002).

== Early life ==
Kaye began playing baseball at the suggestion of a family friend upon moving from Ft. Lauderdale, Florida to Las Vegas, Nevada at twelve years old. Even so, he chose to play football instead of baseball as a freshman at Bishop Gorman High School. He began play high school baseball as a sophomore and threw a one-hitter that year against Green Valley High School. He signed with the Seattle Mariners after being selected in the 19th round of the 1995 Major League Baseball draft.

== Professional career ==
Kaye was assigned to the Arizona League Mariners to begin his professional career in 1995 and spent his first two seasons entirely in the Arizona League. In 1997, the Mariners attempted to convert him to a starting pitcher with the Wisconsin Timber Rattlers and he struggled badly enough that he considered retirement. Kaye progressed through the minor league ranks over the following seasons and was invited to Major League spring training for the first time in 2001. He ultimately made his Major League debut on May 9, 2002, pitching a scoreless inning in relief of Shigetoshi Hasegawa at Safeco Field. He would appear in two more games that season, pitching a total of three innings and surrendering four earned runs. The Mariners demoted him to Triple-A Tacoma on May 24, 2002 and ultimately designated him for assignment in September 2002.

On November 21, 2002, Kaye signed with the Boston Red Sox and was invited to Major League spring training. From 2003 to 2005, Kaye played in the farm systems of the Red Sox, Chicago Cubs, San Diego Padres, New York Yankees and Pittsburgh Pirates. His final professional season came in 2005 with the Altoona Curve.
