= Brian Fitzgerald (baseball) =

American baseball player (born 1974)

- Relief pitcher
- Born: December 26, 1974 (age 51); Woodbridge, Virginia, U.S.
- Batted: Left Threw: Left

MLB debut
- April 17, 2002, for the Seattle Mariners

Last MLB appearance
- May 1, 2002, for the Seattle Mariners

MLB statistics
- Win–loss record: 0-0
- Earned run average: 8.53
- Strikeouts: 3
- Stats at Baseball Reference

Teams
- Seattle Mariners (2002)

Brian Michael Fitzgerald (born December 26, 1974) is a former Major League Baseball relief pitcher who played for the Seattle Mariners in 2002. In 6 games, he had an 8.53 ERA and 3 strikeouts.

Fitzgerald played college baseball for the Virginia Tech Hokies. He set program records for most strikeouts and innings pitched and lowest walk rate. He threw a no-hitter against James Madison in April 1995.

The Mariners drafted Fitzgerald in the 20th round of the 1996 MLB draft. He was the closer for the Wisconsin Timber Rattlers in 1997, earning 10 saves.

The Mariners promoted Fitzgerald to the majors on April 17, 2002, demoting Ron Wright. He threw a scoreless inning of relief that day. He two more scoreless outings but allowed six runs, including two home runs, in his other three MLB appearances. The Mariners designated Fitzgerald for assignment on August 8, freeing a roster spot for Jose Offerman. On August 12, the Colorado Rockies claimed him off waivers.

Fitzgerald retired from baseball in 2003.
