= Juan Alvarez (baseball) =

American baseball player (born 1973)

- Relief pitcher
- Born: August 9, 1973 (age 53); Coral Gables, Florida, U.S.
- Batted: Left Threw: Left

MLB debut
- September 1, 1999, for the Anaheim Angels

Last MLB appearance
- June 3, 2003, for the Florida Marlins

MLB statistics
- Win–loss record: 0–5
- Earned run average: 5.22
- Strikeouts: 42
- Stats at Baseball Reference

Teams
- Anaheim Angels (1999–2000); Texas Rangers (2002); Florida Marlins (2003)

Juan Manuel Alvarez (born August 9, 1973) is an American former professional baseball player who played in four Major League Baseball seasons for the Anaheim Angels, Texas Rangers, and Florida Marlins.

== Career ==
The California Angels signed Alvarez as an amateur free agent on July 25, 1995. After spending 4 seasons in the Angels' farm system, Alvarez made his major league debut in 1999. He was released by the Angels on October 15, 2001, after spending the entire 2001 season in the minor leagues.

On November 30, Alvarez signed with the Texas Rangers. He saw the most action of his major league career with the Rangers in 2002, albeit a season in which he went 0–4. On November 18, he was released by the Rangers and signed with the Florida Marlins on February 5, 2003. Alvarez spent nearly the entire 2003 season in the Marlins' minor league system, appearing in only 9 games, before being released on October 15, 2003.

Alvarez was signed as a free agent by the New York Yankees on February 10, 2004, but didn't play a game with the team, being released on April 3. On April 29, the Marlins re-signed him, but was again released on October 15.

Alvarez shares the major league baseball record with Ed Olwine for most games pitched without a win, at 80.

== Post-playing career ==
Alvarez currently resides in Miami, Florida. In 2006, Alvarez was the pitching coach for the Everett AquaSox of the Northwest League in the Seattle Mariners' organization.

As of 2015, he is the Latin American cross-checker and South Florida area scout for the Cleveland Guardians.
