= Ron Wright (baseball) =

American baseball player (born 1976)

- Designated hitter
- Born: January 21, 1976 (age 50); Delta, Utah, U.S.
- Batted: Right Threw: Right

MLB debut
- April 14, 2002, for the Seattle Mariners

Last MLB appearance
- April 14, 2002, for the Seattle Mariners

MLB statistics
- Batting average: .000
- Games played: 1
- At bats: 3
- Stats at Baseball Reference

Teams
- Seattle Mariners (2002)

Ronald Wade Wright (born January 21, 1976) is an American former professional baseball player who played one game in Major League Baseball (MLB) for the Seattle Mariners in 2002. His minor league career spanned 11 seasons, from 1994 until 2004. He was used almost exclusively as a first baseman in the minors, and was a designated hitter (DH) in his only major league game, in which he batted 0-for-3, hitting into a triple play and a double play.

Wright attended Kamiakin High School in Kennewick, Washington. The Atlanta Braves drafted him in the seventh round of the 1994 MLB draft. In late August 1996, he was traded along with Corey Pointer and a player to be named later (later identified as Jason Schmidt) to the Pittsburgh Pirates for Denny Neagle.

The Pirates called Wright up to the majors in September, but he did not play due to a wrist injury. He started 1998 back in the minors, where he hurt his back stretching. He needed back surgery, which had complications. Afterward, he regularly had numbness in his right leg, which affected his ability to hit for power.

The Cincinnati Reds claimed Wright off waivers in October 1999. After another year in Triple-A, Wright elected free agency and signed with the Tampa Bay Devil Rays. Before the 2002 season, he signed with the Seattle Mariners.

The Mariners called up Wright in mid-April 2002 after future Hall of Fame DH Edgar Martínez ruptured his hamstring. Wright's only major league game was on April 14, which he started as the DH for Seattle against the Texas Rangers. He was not initially scheduled to start, but a ball hit Jeff Cirillo in the head during batting practice. In three plate appearances, Wright achieved the distinction of striking out in the second inning, hitting into a triple play in the fourth inning, and hitting into a double play in the sixth inning. He was replaced by Mark McLemore in the seventh inning, who struck out twice. Seattle won the game, 9–7. After another game on the bench, the Mariners sent Wright back to Triple-A, where he remained the rest of the season.

As of 2025, Wright is the only player to start as a designated hitter in his only MLB game.

Wright signed with the Cleveland Indians before the 2003 season. In June, Cleveland traded him to the Detroit Tigers, who released him in early July. He played 28 games for the independent Sioux Falls Canaries in 2004 to end his professional career.

After retiring from professional baseball, Wright earned a degree in pharmacy at Idaho State University and returned to Utah to work as a pharmacist. He and his wife married in 1997. They have four children.
