= Mark Watson (baseball) =

American baseball player (born 1974)

- Relief pitcher
- Born: January 23, 1974 (age 52); Atlanta, Georgia
- Batted: Right Threw: Left

Professional debut
- MLB: May 19, 2000, for the Cleveland Indians
- NPB: July 19, 2004, for the Hiroshima Toyo Carp

Last appearance
- MLB: August 21, 2003, for the Cincinnati Reds
- NPB: September 15, 2004, for the Hiroshima Toyo Carp

MLB statistics
- Win–loss record: 1–1
- Earned run average: 10.95
- Strikeouts: 7

NPB statistics
- Win–loss record: 0–2
- Earned run average: 3.74
- Strikeouts: 20
- Stats at Baseball Reference

Teams
- Cleveland Indians (2000); Seattle Mariners (2002); Cincinnati Reds (2003); Hiroshima Toyo Carp (2004)

Mark Bradford Watson (born January 23, 1974) is an American former professional baseball pitcher. He played in Major League Baseball (MLB) for the Cleveland Indians (2000), Seattle Mariners (2002), and Cincinnati Reds (2003). He then played in Japan for the Hiroshima Toyo Carp (2004).

== Amateur career ==
A native of Atlanta, Georgia, Watson attended the Marist School in Brookhaven, Georgia. He was selected out of high school by the Los Angeles Dodgers in the 21st round of the 1993 MLB draft but opted to attend Clemson University and the University of Georgia. In 1994, he played collegiate summer baseball in the Cape Cod Baseball League for the Yarmouth-Dennis Red Sox where he threw a no-hitter and was named a league all-star. He was selected by the Florida Marlins in the 8th round of the 1995 MLB draft but did not sign.

== Professional career ==
In June 1996, Watson signed with the Milwaukee Brewers as an amateur free agent. In March 1998, the Brewers traded him to Cleveland for the injured Ben McDonald, who the two teams had traded earlier in the offseason.

Watson made his major league debut with Cleveland in May 2000, appearing in six games in the majors. In June, the Mariners claimed him off waivers. He returned to the minors, pitching in the Seattle, Cleveland, and Chicago Cubs systems before returning to the majors for 3 games with Seattle in 2002. He earned a win in his first game with Seattle. He signed with Cincinnati after the season, pitching in two more MLB games. Over 12 1/3 career major league innings pitched, Watson had a 10.95 earned run average with seven strikeouts and seven walks.

After briefly pitching in Nippon Professional Baseball in 2004, Watson returned to the American minor leagues in 2005, then pitched for the Long Island Ducks of the Atlantic League in 2007.
