= Keith Luuloa =

American baseball player (born 1974)

- Shortstop/Second baseman
- Born: December 24, 1974 (age 51); Honolulu, Hawaii, U.S.
- Batted: Right Threw: Right

MLB debut
- May 17, 2000, for the Anaheim Angels

Last MLB appearance
- May 31, 2000, for the Anaheim Angels

MLB statistics
- Batting average: .333
- Home runs: 0
- Runs batted in: 0
- Stats at Baseball Reference

Teams
- Anaheim Angels (2000)

Keith Hanalei Luuloa (born December 24, 1974) is an American former professional baseball infielder who played for the Anaheim Angels of Major League Baseball (MLB). He played at Modesto Junior College in Modesto, California.

== Career ==
On June 3, 1993, Luuloa was drafted by the California Angels in the 33rd round of the 1993 MLB draft.

On May 17, 2000, he made his MLB debut with the Angels, appearing in 6 games with a .333 batting average in 18 at bats but was traded during the season to the Chicago Cubs.

Luuloa played in the minor leagues for the San Diego Padres, Houston Astros, and Milwaukee Brewers between 2001 and 2003.
