= Luis Ugueto =

Venezuelan baseball player (born 1979)

Toros de Tijuana – No. 1
- Infielder / Coach
- Born: February 15, 1979 (age 47); Caracas, Venezuela
- Batted: Switch Threw: Right

Professional debut
- MLB: April 3, 2002, for the Seattle Mariners
- CPBL: March 21, 2006, for the Uni-President Lions

Last appearance
- MLB: September 23, 2003, for the Seattle Mariners
- CPBL: August 15, 2006, for the Uni-President Lions

MLB statistics
- Batting average: .214
- Home runs: 1
- Runs batted in: 2

CPBL statistics
- Batting average: .239
- Home runs: 5
- Runs batted in: 31
- Stats at Baseball Reference

Teams
- Seattle Mariners (2002–2003); Uni-President Lions (2006)

Luis Enrique Ugueto [oo-geh-to] (born February 15, 1979) is a Venezuelan former professional baseball second baseman and switch-hitter. He played in Major League Baseball (MLB) for the Seattle Mariners in 2002 and 2003, and in the Chinese Professional Baseball League (CPBL) for the Uni-President Lions in 2006. He currently serves as a coach for the Toros de Tijuana of the Mexican League.

== Playing career ==
Originally signed by the Florida Marlins as an amateur free agent in 1996, he was drafted by the Pittsburgh Pirates from Florida in the 2001 Rule 5 draft, and was traded to the Mariners for cash the same day. Finally, he made his debut with the Mariners on April 3, 2002.

Ugueto was a young infielder with a strong arm and was fast on the bases. What Seattle hoped would develop was his bat and his overall feel for the game, especially defensively, at the major league level. In two seasons as a backup with the Mariners, Ugueto batted .214 with one home run and two RBI in 74 games.

Ugueto signed with the Kansas City Royals prior to the 2005 season and spent the season with the Royals' top minor league club, the Omaha Royals. While with Omaha, he was suspended twice in 2005 for violating baseball's steroid policy and suspended for 15 and 30 games, respectively. Ugueto was released by the Royals after the second violation.

After missing the entire 2006 season, Ugueto played with the Minnesota Twins minor league team, the Fort Myers Miracle during the 2007 season. In 2008, he played in Italy's Serie A1 for the Caffè Danesi Nettuno and hit .289. He also shortly played for the Laredo Broncos.

== Coaching career ==
On May 8, 2026, Ugueto was hired to serve as a coach for the Toros de Tijuana of the Mexican League.

== See also ==
- List of Major League Baseball players from Venezuela
