= Aaron Taylor (baseball) =

American baseball player (born 1977)

- Relief pitcher
- Born: August 20, 1977 (age 49); Valdosta, Georgia, U.S.
- Batted: Right Threw: Right

MLB debut
- September 9, 2002, for the Seattle Mariners

Last MLB appearance
- October 2, 2004, for the Seattle Mariners

MLB statistics
- Win–loss record: 0-0
- Earned run average: 8.86
- Strikeouts: 19
- Stats at Baseball Reference

Teams
- Seattle Mariners (2002–2004)

Aaron Wade Taylor (born August 20, 1977), nicknamed Big Country, is an American former Major League Baseball (MLB) relief pitcher for the Seattle Mariners.

The Atlanta Braves drafted Taylor in the 11th round of the 1996 MLB draft. The Mariners selected him in the Double-A phase of the 1999 Rule 5 draft.

Taylor made his MLB debut with the Mariners on September 9, 2002, allowing home runs to Alex Rodriguez and Rafael Palmeiro. He made his final appearance on October 2, 2004. He had an ERA of at least 8.53 and pitched in no more than ten games in his three MLB seasons.

On December 20, 2004, Taylor was traded to the Colorado Rockies for Sean Green. Taylor he never pitched a game for the Rockies and had rotator cuff surgery. In 2006, he played three games for the independent Chico Outlaws of the Golden Baseball League.
