= Jeff Cirillo =

American baseball player (born 1969)

- Third baseman
- Born: September 23, 1969 (age 56); Pasadena, California, U.S.
- Batted: Right Threw: Right

MLB debut
- May 11, 1994, for the Milwaukee Brewers

Last MLB appearance
- September 30, 2007, for the Arizona Diamondbacks

MLB statistics
- Batting average: .296
- Home runs: 112
- Runs batted in: 727
- Stats at Baseball Reference

Teams
- Milwaukee Brewers (1994–1999); Colorado Rockies (2000–2001); Seattle Mariners (2002–2003); San Diego Padres (2004); Milwaukee Brewers (2005–2006); Minnesota Twins (2007); Arizona Diamondbacks (2007)

Career highlights and awards
- 2× All-Star (1997, 2000); Milwaukee Brewers Wall of Honor

Jeffrey Howard Cirillo (born September 23, 1969) is an American former third baseman in Major League Baseball. In a 14-season career, Cirillo was a .296 hitter with 112 home runs and 727 RBI in 1617 games. He was named an All-Star in 1997 and 2000. He shares the major league record of playing 99 consecutive errorless games at third base with John Wehner. He batted and threw right-handed.

== Early life ==
Cirillo was born in Pasadena, California. His step-brother, Adam Grant, played baseball at UCSB. Cirillo attended Providence High School where he excelled in both baseball and basketball. Then, he enrolled at the University of Southern California after receiving little attention from colleges in his high school years. As a Trojan, he started out as a pitcher; however, he was moved to third base later in his college career. He graduated with a degree in communications.

== Professional career ==
The Milwaukee Brewers drafted Cirillo in the 11th round of the 1991 MLB draft. With the Brewers, Cirillo collected a .300 batting average or better for three seasons, including a career-high .326 in 1999. The same year, he added 198 hits (also a career-high) with 15 home runs and 88 RBI. His most productive season came in 2000 with the Colorado Rockies, when he posted career-highs in RBI (115), runs (111), and doubles (53); finished with 195 hits; and matched his personal-best .326 average.

On December 16, 2001, the Rockies traded Cirillo to the Seattle Mariners for Denny Stark, Brian Fuentes, and José Paniagua. Posting the lowest BABIP since his rookie season, he was ineffective with the bat but provided strong defensive contributions while in Seattle, ranked by UZR as the second best third baseman in the American League in 2002. In 2003, he continued to provide above average defense but again posted the lowest BABIP of his career (.226 compared to a .320 career average).

Cirillo was traded to the San Diego Padres before the 2004 season but was inactive most of the year with a wrist injury. He made history by becoming Randy Johnson's 4,000th strikeout victim on June 29, 2004.

Rejoining the Milwaukee Brewers in 2005, Cirillo saw a resurgence in his stroke while continuing his solid defense posting wOBA's of .355 in 2005 and .344 in 2006.

Cirillo signed a one-year contract with the Minnesota Twins in December 2006. He did not finish the season with the Twins and was claimed off waivers by the Arizona Diamondbacks on August 3, 2007. Cirillo stated that he would most certainly retire at the end of the 2007 season. He made the only pitching appearance of his career on August 20, 2007, against Milwaukee. He pitched one inning and gave up two walks and no runs while striking out Craig Counsell. "He's way nastier than I thought he would be," said Bill Hall, who worked one of the walks. "I was shocked when I got up there. He's got a knuckleball, a slider, he was throwing some changeups. Those pitches make 84, 83 [mph fastballs] look pretty hard. I heard he was a better pitcher in college than he was a hitter."

Before the 2007 NLDS, Cirillo held one of baseball's most unwanted records. He had played in 1,617 regular season games but never in the postseason. When Arizona made the playoffs, the title was passed to Damion Easley of the New York Mets who finished the 2008 season having played 1,706 straight games without a playoff berth.

Cirillo has the best career all-time batting average as a Brewer: .307.

== Post-playing days ==
On April 2, 2008, it was announced that Cirillo would join FSN Wisconsin as an analyst for Milwaukee Brewers broadcasts. His first appearance was on April 18, 2008. He worked as a pre/post-game show for two years in 2008 and 2011.

Cirillo has worked as a part-time scout with the Arizona Diamondbacks (2009 and 2010). Cirillo was then hired by the Los Angeles Angels of Anaheim as a scout.

Cirillo is a partner in Pacific Baseball Ventures, which owns the Walla Walla Sweets and the Yakima Valley Pippins. Both teams play in the West Coast League, a summer collegiate wood-bat league. In 2020, he became Walla Walla's manager, but the team's season was cancelled and he did not return to the team in 2021 due to a family emergency.

Cirillo was also an assistant baseball coach for the Bellevue High School baseball team, where he coached his sons. As a coach and scout, Cirillo encouraged Corbin Carroll to commit to playing baseball.

== Personal life ==
Cirillo has three sons with his ex-wife Nancy: Cole, Carson, and Connor. Cole played football and basketball, as well as participating in track and field events, at Bellevue High School before graduating in 2016. He graduated Magna Cum Laude from the University of Southern California in 2020 and is currently a Management Consulting Associate at KPMG. Carson played varsity baseball and golf at Bellevue High School, now attending the University of Puget Sound, and Connor, who played basketball and baseball, graduated in 2019 with the intention of attending the University of Southern California as well.

== See also ==
- List of Colorado Rockies team records
