= Shigetoshi Hasegawa =

Japanese baseball player (born 1968)

Shigetoshi Hasegawa 長谷川 滋利
- Pitcher
- Born: August 1, 1968 (age 56); Kakogawa, Hyogo, Japan
- Batted: Right Threw: Right

Professional debut
- NPB: April 11, 1991, for the Orix BlueWave
- MLB: April 6, 1997, for the Anaheim Angels

Last appearance
- NPB: 1996, for the Orix BlueWave
- MLB: September 28, 2005, for the Seattle Mariners

NPB statistics
- Win–loss record: 57–45
- Earned run average: 3.33
- Strikeouts: 515

MLB statistics
- Win–loss record: 45–43
- Earned run average: 3.70
- Strikeouts: 447
- Stats at Baseball Reference

Teams
- Orix BlueWave (1990–1996); Anaheim Angels (1997–2001); Seattle Mariners (2002–2005)

Career highlights and awards
- MLB All-Star (2003); Pacific League Rookie of the Year (1991)
Medals
Men's baseball
Representing Japan
Goodwill Games
| Silver medal – second place | 1990 Seattle | Team |

Shigetoshi Hasegawa (長谷川 滋利, Hasegawa Shigetoshi; born August 1, 1968) is a retired relief pitcher in Major League Baseball. He achieved the most recognition when he played for the Seattle Mariners from 2002 through 2005. Previously, Hasegawa played with the Anaheim Angels (1997–2001), and before that spent six years with the Orix BlueWave. He bats and throws right-handed.

== Baseball career ==
Hasegawa was drafted in the first round by the Orix BlueWave in 1990. He won 12 games in his rookie year, and received the Japanese Rookie of the Year Award in 1991. He was a teammate of Ichiro Suzuki in Japan and won two championships with the Orix BlueWave. In six seasons with the BlueWave, he was 57–45 with a 3.33 ERA.

Hasegawa was purchased by the Anaheim Angels in January 1997, and he pitched well as a setup man. He signed with the Seattle Mariners on January 14, 2002. In 2003, Hasegawa was named to the American League All-Star team as a middle reliever. He converted 16 of 17 saves at the end of the season when Mariners closer Kazuhiro Sasaki was injured. He concluded the season with a 1.48 ERA in 63 relief appearances.

Hasegawa was not offered a contract by the Mariners after the 2005 season, On January 23, 2006, he announced his retirement despite receiving several offers from MLB and Japanese league teams. In his nine-season MLB career, Hasegawa compiled a 45–44 record with 33 saves and a 3.71 ERA in 517 games. He holds the record for most appearances by an Asian pitcher in Major League Baseball ahead of Hideo Nomo. Hasegawa was known for releasing the ball very quickly, throwing off the batter's timing. He was very durable, spending time on the disabled list only once in nine years in the majors.

== Personal life ==
Hasegawa said that he did not move to the U.S. to play in the majors; he entered the majors because he wanted to live in the U.S. He has since obtained permanent residence in the U.S. He speaks fluent English and wrote a book teaching English to Japanese speakers. He interviewed teammates on an American television show, and he introduced himself in English at his first press conference in the U.S.

After retiring from baseball, Hasegawa sold real estate in Irvine, California, appeared on baseball-related television shows in Japan, and was a commentator for MLB games shown in Japan on NHK.
