= History of the Minnesota Twins =

The Minnesota Twins are an American professional baseball team based in Minneapolis. The Twins compete in Major League Baseball (MLB) as a member club of the American League (AL) Central division. The team is named after the Twin Cities area of Minneapolis and Saint Paul. The club was originally founded in 1901 as the Washington Senators, and was one of the American League's eight original charter franchises. By 1903, peace was restored with agreements between the two rival baseball loops on player contract and represented member cities/teams, and the beginnings of a national championship series titled the World Series. In 1905, the team changed its official name to the Washington Nationals. The name "Nationals" would appear on the uniforms for only two seasons, and would then be replaced with the "W" logo for the next 52 years. The media often shortened the nickname to "Nats". Many fans and newspapers (especially out-of-town papers) persisted in continuing using the previous "Senators" nickname. Over time, "Nationals" faded as a nickname, and "Senators" became dominant. Baseball guides would list the club's nickname as "Nationals or Senators", acknowledging the dual-nickname situation. After 61 years in the capital, in 1961, the Washington Senators relocated to the Twin Cities of Minnesota, to be called the Twins, being the first major league baseball team to use a state in its geographical identifier name rather than the traditional city; Washington would get a new incarnation of the Senators to fill the void left by the original team's move (they are now the Texas Rangers).

In its 108-year history, the franchise has employed 29 managers and won 3 World Series championships. Seven managers have taken the franchise to the postseason. Ron Gardenhire, manager of the Twins from 2002 to 2014, led them to six playoff appearances, the most in their franchise history. Two managers have won the World Series with the franchise: Bucky Harris, in 1924 against the New York Giants; and Tom Kelly, in 1987 against the St. Louis Cardinals and 1991 against the Atlanta Braves.

== Minnesota Twins: 1961–present ==
=== A unique name for a unique situation ===
The name "Twins" derives from the popular name of the region, the Twin Cities. Knowing about the bitter century-long rivalry between Minneapolis and St. Paul, Griffith was determined not to alienate fans in either city by naming the team after one city or the other. Instead, he proposed to name his team the Twin Cities Twins. However, after a meeting with state officials, a decision then unprecedented in American professional baseball was made. The team would be named after its home state and became known as the Minnesota Twins on November 26, 1960. The NFL expansion team Minnesota Vikings had announced their name on September 27, 1960. This was one month before the Senators moved to Minnesota. Later, the California Angels (now the Los Angeles Angels), Texas Rangers (coincidentally, the relocated expansion Senators), Florida Marlins (now the Miami Marlins), Colorado Rockies and Arizona Diamondbacks would follow their lead.

However, the original "Twin Cities Twins" TC logo was kept until 1987, when the Twins adopted their current uniforms. By this time, the Twins felt they were established enough that they could place an "M" on their caps without making St. Paul fans thinking it stood for Minneapolis. The "TC" logo returned to one version of the home uniforms in 2002, as did the team's original cartoon logo: two players representing the area's two minor league teams displaced by the Twins—the Minneapolis Millers and St. Paul Saints—shaking hands over the Mississippi River, which runs between the two cities. The Twins returned to the classic "TC" logo on all uniforms since the 2014 season.

=== 1960s: The Twins arrive in Minnesota ===
The Twins were eagerly greeted in Minnesota when they arrived in 1961. They brought a nucleus of talented players: Harmon Killebrew, Bob Allison, Camilo Pascual, Zoilo Versalles, Jim Kaat, Earl Battey, and Lenny Green. Tony Oliva, who would go on to win American League batting championships in 1964, 1965 and 1971, made his major league debut in 1962. That year, the Twins won 91 games, the franchise's first winning season since 1952, and most by the franchise since 1933. They also finished second in the American League, five games behind the Yankees–the first time that the franchise had been a factor in a pennant race since 1945.

The Twins of manager Sam Mele won 102 games and the American League Pennant in 1965, driven by the exciting play of superstar slugger Killebrew and batting champion Oliva, the 21 pitching victories by Mudcat Grant, and the flashy play of league MVP Zoilo Versalles. However, they were defeated in the 1965 World Series by the Los Angeles Dodgers in seven games; each home team had won until Game 7, when Sandy Koufax shut out the Twins 2–0 in Minnesota. The Twins scored a total of two runs in their four losses, and were shut out three times, twice by Koufax. Although disappointed with the near-miss, the championship drive cemented the team's relationship with the people of Minnesota. The Twins would wait 22 years to return to the World Series; they defeated the St. Louis Cardinals in seven games in the 1987 Series.

In 1967, the Twins were involved in one of the closest pennant races in baseball history. Heading into the final weekend of the season, the Twins, Boston Red Sox, Chicago White Sox, and Detroit Tigers all had a shot at clinching the American League championship. With two games left to play, the Twins were one game on top of the Red Sox in the standings; moreover, the two remaining games each team had to play happened to be against each other. Unfortunately for Minnesota baseball fans, the Red Sox won both games and clinched their first pennant since 1946, finishing with a 92–70 record. The Twins and Tigers both finished a game behind, at 91–71, while the White Sox were three games out, at 89–73. Rod Carew was named the American League Rookie of the Year.

In 1969, Billy Martin was named manager. Martin pushed aggressive base running, with Carew stealing home seven times. The Twins won the American League West, led by Carew (.332, his first batting title), Oliva (.309, 24 HR, 101 RBI) and league MVP Killebrew (49 HR, 140 RBI). Unfortunately, the Twins were swept by the Baltimore Orioles, who had set a franchise record of 109–53, in the first American League Championship Series. The Orioles would lose to the "Miracle Mets" in the 1969 World Series. Martin was fired after the season following an August 1969 fight in Detroit with 20-game winner Dave Boswell and outfielder Bob Allison, in an alley outside the Lindell A.C. bar. However Bill Rigney led the Twins to a repeat division title in 1970, behind the star pitching of Jim Perry (24–12), the A.L. Cy Young Award winner, while the Orioles again won the Eastern Division Championship behind the star pitching of Jim Palmer. Once again, the Orioles won the A.L. Championship Series in a three-game sweep, and this time they would win the World Series.

=== 1970s: From first place to mediocrity ===
The team continued to post winning records through 1971, winning the first two American League West division titles. However, they then entered a decade-long slump, finishing around .500 for the next eight years. Tony Oliva and Rod Carew continued to provide offensive power, but Killebrew's home run production decreased, as injuries impacted his effectiveness, and the pitching staff languished. Killebrew's final season with the Twins was the 1974 season.

Owner Calvin Griffith faced financial difficulty with the start of free agency. While other owners had fortunes made in other businesses, Griffith's only income came from baseball. He ran the Twins as a family-owned business, employing many family members, and had to turn a profit each season. Stars Lyman Bostock and Larry Hisle left as free agents after the 1977 season and prompted the trade of Rod Carew to the Angels after the 1978 season.

=== 1980–1992: Twins dynasty – the Tom Kelly era ===
In the early 1980s, The Twins fell further, winning only 37% of its games from 1981 to 1982. They had their worst season in Minnesota in 1982, with a 60–102 record, the worst the franchise had since the 1904 season (that team went 38–113). It was the first (and last until 2016) 100-loss season in Minnesota. From their arrival in 1961 through 1981, the team played its games at Metropolitan Stadium in Bloomington, a suburb south of the Twin Cities. The Mall of America now occupies the spot where the "Old Met" stood, complete with home plate and the seat where Harmon Killebrew hit a 520-foot home run; both of those landmarks are located inside of Nickelodeon Universe. The 1982 season brought the team indoors, into Hubert H. Humphrey Metrodome, which was located in downtown Minneapolis near the Mississippi River.

In 1984, Calvin Griffith sold the Twins to Minneapolis banker Carl Pohlad. In 1985, Minnesota hosted the All-Star Game at Metrodome, with the National League winning the game 6–1 over the American League. Future World Series MVP Jack Morris was the losing pitcher for the American League.

After several losing seasons in the Dome, a nucleus of players acquired during the waning years of the Griffith regime (Kent Hrbek, Tom Brunansky, Gary Gaetti, Frank Viola) combined with a few good trades (Bert Blyleven), intelligent free agent acquisitions (Al Newman, Roy Smalley), and a rising star in Kirby Puckett, combined to return the team to the World Series for the first time since 1965, defeating the Detroit Tigers (who won the World Series three years earlier) in the ALCS along the way. The dynamic play of the new superstars propelled the Twins to a seven-game victory over the St. Louis Cardinals to win the 1987 World Series. The Twins hosted 4 games in the World Series, proving to be the difference, as all games in the 1987 series were won by the home team.

The 1987 Twins set a record for fewest regular season victories by a World Series champion with 85 and a .525 winning percentage. This record was broken by the 2006 Cardinals, who won the World Series after going 83–78 during the regular season and a .513 percentage. While their 56–25 record at Metrodome was the best overall home record for 1987, the Twins had an appalling 29–52 mark away from Metrodome and they only won nine road games after the All-Star break.

The Twins won more games in 1988, but could not overcome the powerhouse division rival Oakland Athletics (who in turn lost the 1988 World Series to the Los Angeles Dodgers), even though pitcher Frank Viola won the Cy Young Award in that year. 1989 saw a decline in the win column although Puckett would win the batting title that season.

The Twins surprisingly did quite poorly in 1990, finishing last in the AL West division with a record of 74–88, 29 games behind the Athletics, the eventual World Series runner-up. 1991 brought breakout years from newcomers Shane Mack, Scott Leius, Chili Davis, and rookie of the year Chuck Knoblauch, along with consistently excellent performances from stars Hrbek and Puckett. The pitching staff excelled as well, with 20-game winner Scott Erickson, closer Rick Aguilera, and newly acquired free agent, St. Paul native Jack Morris, having all-star years. The Twins defeated the Toronto Blue Jays in five games to win the 1991 ALCS and the Atlanta Braves 4 games to 3 to win the nail-biting 1991 World Series, which is considered by many to be the greatest of all time. Game 6 is widely considered to be one of the greatest World Series games ever played. Facing elimination, and with the score tied 3–3 in the bottom of the 11th inning, Kirby Puckett stepped up to the plate and drove the game-winning home run into the left field seats to force a decisive Game 7. This famously led to Jack Buck, who was broadcasting the game on CBS television to say "And we'll see you tomorrow night!" The home run was Puckett's only walk-off home run of his career. In the final and deciding game, Jack Morris pitched a 10-inning shutout, viewed by many baseball historians as one of the greatest pitching performances in a 7th game of the World Series, to beat the Braves 1–0 and bring home the championship to Minnesota. 1991 was considered to be the first season that any team that ended in last place the previous year advanced to the World Series; both the Twins and Braves accomplished the unprecedented feat. ESPN rated the 1991 World Series as the best ever played in a 2003 centennial retrospective of the World Series. As with the 1987 World Series, which the Twins also won, all 7 games were won by the home team.

The Twins were the first World Series champion to lose three away games and still win the series by winning all four home games, doing it in 1987 and again in 1991. The Arizona Diamondbacks duplicated this feat in 2001, when they became the first National League team to do so.

1992 saw another superb Athletic team that the Twins could not overcome, despite a 90–72 season and solid pitching from John Smiley. After that season, the Twins again fell into an extended slump, posting a losing record each year for the next eight years: 71–91 in 1993, 50–63 in 1994, 56–88 in 1995, 78–84 in 1996, 68–94 in 1997, 70–92 in 1998, 63–97 in 1999 and 69–93 in 2000. From 1994 to 1997 a long sequence of retirements and injuries hurt the team badly, and Tom Kelly spent the remainder of his managerial career attempting to rebuild the Twins.

Puckett after the 1995 season was forced to retire at age 35 due to loss of vision in one eye from a central retinal vein occlusion. He retired as the Twins' all-time leader in career hits, runs, doubles, and total bases. At the time of his retirement, his .318 career batting average was the highest by any right-handed American League batter since Joe DiMaggio. Puckett was the fourth baseball player during the 20th century to record 1,000 hits in his first five full calendar years in Major League Baseball, and was the second to record 2,000 hits during his first ten full calendar years. He was elected to the Baseball Hall of Fame in 2001, his first year of eligibility.

In 1997, owner Carl Pohlad almost sold the Twins to North Carolina businessman Don Beaver, who would have moved the team to the Piedmont Triad (Greensboro–Winston-Salem–High Point) area of the state. The defeat of a referendum for a stadium in that area and a lack of interest in building a stadium for the Twins in Charlotte killed the deal. In 1998, management cleared out the team of all of its players earning over $1 million (except for pitcher Brad Radke) and rebuilt from the ground up; the team barely avoided finishing in last place that year, finishing just five games ahead of the Tigers and avoiding the mark of 100 losses by eight games.

=== 2000s: A perennial contender ===
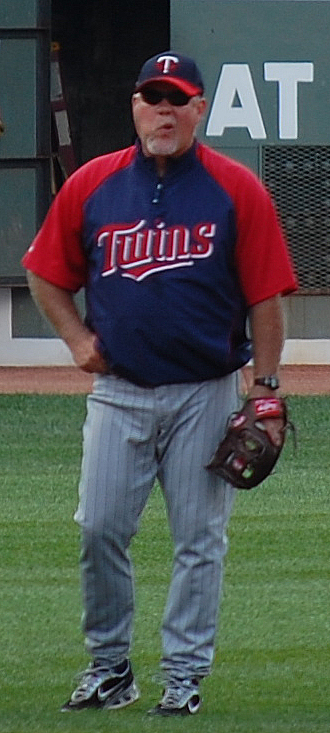
Ron Gardenhire, manager of the Minnesota Twins from 2002 to 2014

The team introduced a new character mascot, T.C. Bear, on April 3, 2000.

On the field during this decade, things turned around, and from 2001 to 2006, the Twins compiled the longest streak of consecutive winning seasons since moving to Minnesota, going 85–77 in 2001, 94–67 in 2002, 90–72 in 2003, 92–70 in 2004, 83–79 in 2005, and 96–66 in 2006. From 2002 to 2004, the Twins compiled their longest streak of consecutive league/division championships ever (previous were the 1924 World Champion-1925 AL Champion Senators and the 1969–70 Twins). Threatened with closure by league contraction (along with the Montreal Expos) in 2002, the team battled back to reach the ALCS before being eliminated 4–1 by that year's eventual World Series champion Anaheim Angels. Their streak of three straight division titles, along with some bitterly fought games, have helped to create an intense rivalry with the Chicago White Sox in recent years, starting with 2000 when the White Sox clinched the division at the Metrodome, and heating up especially in 2003, 2004, 2005 and 2008.

In 2006, the Twins came from 12 games back in the division at the All-Star break to tie the Detroit Tigers for the lead in the 159th game of the season. With the Tigers having won the season head-to-head by 11 games to 8, the Twins needed a Tigers loss and a Twins win in order to take sole possession of first place and win the division outright, and got both on the last day of the season, when the Tigers lost their third straight game at home to the last place Kansas City Royals in a 10–8 game in 12 innings. After their win against the Chicago White Sox, the Minnesota Twins and somewhere between 30,000 and 40,000 fans watched the Tigers-Royals game on Metrodome's jumbotrons. This was the first time in major league history that a team has won a division or league outright on the last day of the regular season without ever having had sole possession of first place earlier. The magical season came to a sudden end, however, as the Twins were swept 3–0 by the Oakland Athletics in the ALDS, while Detroit went on as a wild card entry, beat the New York Yankees 3–1 in their divisional series, and went on to play the Athletics. The Tigers would sweep the Athletics 4–0 in the ALCS and lose the 2006 World Series to the St. Louis Cardinals, who coincidentally broke the record held by the Twins for the worst regular season record by a World Series champion (having gone 83–79).

The Twins became the first team in Major League history to sweep the Player of the Month, Pitcher of the Month, and Rookie of the Month awards, accomplishing this feat in June 2006 with catcher Joe Mauer, pitcher Johan Santana, and rookie pitcher Francisco Liriano respectively. Also in 2006, the club became one of the most decorated in recent baseball history, with Justin Morneau's MVP following the AL Cy Young Award won by Johan Santana and the AL batting title by Joe Mauer. The last team to accomplish this was the 1962 Los Angeles Dodgers. In addition, center fielder Torii Hunter was awarded the Rawlings Gold Glove Award for his defense in the 2006 season, and Mauer and Morneau each received a Silver Slugger Award for the offense as catcher and first baseman respectively.

A new nickname was unintentionally introduced by White Sox manager Ozzie Guillén, who called the Twins "Little Piranhas" as they gobbled up wins in July through August in the 2006 season. In 2007, the Twins sometimes played an animated sequence of piranhas munching under that caption, in situations where the Twins were scoring runs via "small ball". That season would prove to be disappointing for the Twins, as they finished third in the AL Central with a 79–83 record. After the season, Torii Hunter signed with the Los Angeles Angels, while Johan Santana was traded to the New York Mets.

In 2008, the Twins finished the 162-game season tied with the White Sox, who won a rained out game against the Detroit Tigers to face the Twins in Chicago in a 1-game playoff to reach the ALDS. Nick Blackburn pitched for the Twins, giving up 1 run in 6 1/3 innings of baseball, allowing a solo home run to Jim Thome. The Twins lost the game and missed the playoffs while the White Sox went on to lose to the eventual American League champion Tampa Bay Rays in four games. This was the last Major League Baseball tiebreaker playoff game whose site was determined by a coin flip. Beginning with the 2009 season, sites for tiebreaker games were determined by the regular season head-to-head record between the teams involved. Had this rule been in place for the 2008 season, the Twins-White Sox tiebreaker would have been played at the Metrodome.

In the 2009 season (the final season at the Metrodome) the Twins would go on to tie the Tigers for the division at season's end and then played a one-game playoff in Minnesota because Minnesota had a better head-to-head record with Detroit, a choice made in response to the previous year. The Twins beat the Tigers 6–5 in 12 innings on a walk-off single by Alexi Casilla, but the season ended with the Twins getting swept 3–0 in the first round of the playoffs by the eventual World Series champion Yankees. It marked the third time in the 2000s that the Yankees had defeated the Twins in the Division Series (as they had done so in 2003 and 2004).

==== Contraction threat and new stadium ====
Throughout the 1990s, the Twins argued that the lack of a modern baseball-dedicated ballpark stood in the way of producing a top-notch, competitive team. They stated that the Metrodome generated too little revenue for the Twins to be competitive. In particular, the Twins received very little revenue from luxury suite leasing (as the majority are owned by the co-tenant Minnesota Vikings) and only a small percentage of concessions sales; also, the percentage of season-ticket-quality seats in Metrodome was said to be very low compared to other stadiums, and the capacity of the stadium was far too high for baseball. However, attempts to spur interest and push legislative efforts towards a new stadium repeatedly failed prior to 2006. The Metrodome was thought to be an increasingly poor fit for all three of its major tenants (the Twins, the Vikings and the university of Minnesota Golden Gophers football team). However, it is generally believed that Metrodome played a key role in the two World Series they have won while in Minnesota. The Metrodome's painfully high decibel levels (as high as 125 decibels—the same as a jet airliner taking off), as well as its many quirks (such as the artificial turf and the white roof) gave the Twins a huge home field advantage. The Twins won every one of their home games in their two World Series victories. Although it was built in 1982, by the start of the 1990s it was already considered obsolete because it had few revenue-generating luxury suites. During the 1990s and early 2000s, the Twins were often rumored to be moving to such places as New Jersey, Las Vegas, Portland, Oregon, the Raleigh–Durham area, and others in search of a more financially competitive market. The team was nearly contracted (disbanded) in 2002, a move which would have eliminated the Twins and the Montreal Expos, now the Washington Nationals, franchise. The Twins survived largely due to a court decision which forced them to play out their lease on Metrodome.

In October 2005 the Twins went back to state court asking for a ruling that they have no long-term lease with the Metropolitan Sports Facilities Commission, the owner of the Metrodome where the Twins were playing. In February 2006 the court ruled favorably on the Twins motion. Thus, the Twins were not obligated to play in Metrodome after the 2006 season. This removed one of the roadblocks that prevented contraction prior to the 2002 season and cleared the way for the Twins to either be relocated or disbanded prior to the 2007 season if a new deal was not reached.

On May 21, 2006, the Twins' new stadium received the approval of the Minnesota House of Representatives, with a vote of 71–61, and then received approval from the Senate, with a vote of 34–32, after 4:00 AM on the second-to-last day of the 2006 legislative session. The bill moved on to Governor Tim Pawlenty, who signed it during a special pre-game ceremony at Metrodome on May 26, 2006 (the Twins played the Seattle Mariners that night) on what will be the first home plate installed in the new stadium.

On January 5, 2009, owner Carl Pohlad died at the age of 93. Pohlad's three sons inherited the team, with Jim Pohlad assuming control of day-to-day operations and acting as principal owner. The Pohlad family invested significant sums of their own money into construction of Target Field, and ownership of the team has remained with the Pohlads to this day.

=== 2010–present: New stadium ===
The Twins' first season at Target Field was a success, as they went 94–68 and won their second consecutive AL Central title. They were also swept by the New York Yankees in the ALDS for the second year in a row. However, the Twins would follow up with four consecutive seasons of at least 90 losses, finishing last in their division three times in those four seasons. Justin Morneau was traded to the Pittsburgh Pirates during the 2013 season, and Ron Gardenhire was fired after the 2014 season. He was replaced by Paul Molitor.

==== 2015 season ====
In 2015, the Twins rebounded with an 83–79 record and finished second in the AL Central, despite having allowed four more runs than they scored. Torii Hunter returned to Minnesota for what would be his final season.

==== 2016 season ====
The Twins signed Korean baseball star Byung-ho Park in the offseason, in addition to acquiring John Ryan Murphy, a catcher, in a trade with the Yankees. The team's encouraging 83–79 finish the previous season behind good rookie seasons from Miguel Sano, Eddie Rosario, Tyler Duffey, and Byron Buxton, along with the anticipated arrival of Minor Leaguers José Berríos and Max Kepler, gave Twins' fans high hopes for the 2016 season. However, the season became a complete disaster, starting with the Twins losing their first nine games of the season and never getting out of last place in the AL Central. They finished with a record of 59–103, the worst in the league. The 2016 season was the Twins' worst during their tenure in Minnesota.

==== 2017 season ====
In 2017, the Twins' 85–77 record earned them the second wild card spot, making them the first team in history to clinch a postseason berth after losing 100 games the previous season. The Twins lost the 2017 American League Wild Card Game to the New York Yankees.

==== 2018 season ====
The 2018 season was the last for the Twins' franchise player, Joe Mauer. In the 9th inning of the last game of the season on September 30, 2018, at Target Field, Mauer made an appearance as catcher for the first time since his concussion in 2013, before being removed for backup Chris Gimenez after one pitch. He exited to a standing ovation from the crowd and both dugouts. The Twins finished second in the AL Central with a 78–84 record, and Paul Molitor was fired after the season and replaced by Rocco Baldelli.

==== 2019 season ====
In 2019, the Twins finished with the second-most wins in franchise history, winning their first AL Central crown since 2010 with a 101–61 record. The Twins also became the first team in history to have at least five players with at least 30 home runs. Baldelli was named the American League Manager of the Year. The Twins were swept in the ALDS by the New York Yankees.

==== 2020 season ====
In the 2020 season, which was shortened to 60 games due to the COVID-19 pandemic, the Twins won the AL Central with a 36–24 record. They were swept two games to none in the Wild Card Series by the Houston Astros, giving the Twins the dubious record of the longest postseason losing streak in all four major North American professional sports leagues.

==== 2021 season ====
In 2021, the Twins would have a disappointing year as they finished last in the AL Central with a 73–89 record. The team was flagged with multiple injuries to many of their star players, including Byron Buxton, Michael Pineda, and Kenta Maeda. On July 30, the Twins traded ace pitcher José Berríos to the Toronto Blue Jays.

==== 2022 season ====
In 2022, the Twins added pitchers Sonny Gray and Dylan Bundy and catcher Gary Sánchez. They also signed free agent shortstop Carlos Correa away from the Houston Astros. The first half of the season saw the Twins appear to have returned to their winning ways; on July 5, they were ten games above .500 and had a 4 1/2-game lead in the AL Central. However, the Twins stumbled through the rest of the summer and lost 14 of their last 20 games to finish third with a 78–84 record and miss the postseason for the second year in a row.

==== 2023 season ====
In 2023, the Twins traded infielder Luis Arráez to the Miami Marlins for pitcher Pablo López and two minor league prospects. The Twins had a mediocre first half of the 2023 season, reaching the All-Star break with a 45–46 record, but had a resurgence in the second half to finish with an 87–75 record and the AL Central crown. They swept the Toronto Blue Jays in the Wild Card Series before losing to the Houston Astros in the Division Series.
