= List of Minnesota Twins no-hitters =

The Minnesota Twins are a Major League Baseball franchise based in Minneapolis, Minnesota. They play in the American League Central division. Also known in their early years as the "Washington Senators" (1901–1960) based in Washington, D.C., pitchers for the Twins have thrown seven no-hitters in franchise history. A no-hitter is officially recognized by Major League Baseball only "when a pitcher (or pitchers) allows no hits during the entire course of a game, which consists of at least nine innings", though one or more batters "may reach base via a walk, an error, a hit by pitch, a passed ball or wild pitch on strike three, or catcher's interference". No-hitters of less than nine complete innings were previously recognized by the league as official; however, several rule alterations in 1991 changed the rule to its current form. A perfect game, a special subcategory of no-hitter, has yet to be thrown in Twins history. As defined by Major League Baseball, "in a perfect game, no batter reaches any base during the course of the game."

Walter Johnson threw the first no-hitter in Senators/Twins history on July 1, 1920; the most recent no-hitter was thrown by Francisco Liriano on May 3, 2011. Four left-handed pitchers have thrown no-hitters in franchise history while three were by right-handers. The longest interval between no-hitters was between the games pitched by Bobby Burke and Jack Kralick, encompassing 31 years and 8 days from August 8, 1931, to August 26, 1962. Conversely, the shortest interval between no-hitters was between the games pitched by Kralick and Dean Chance, encompassing 4 years and 364 days from August 26, 1962, to August 25, 1967. They no-hit the Boston Red Sox the most, which occurred twice, which were no-hit by Johnson in 1920 and Burke in 1931. There is one no-hitter in which the team allowed at least a run, thrown by Chance in 1967. The most baserunners allowed in a no-hitter were by Chance (in 1967) and Liriano (in 2011), who each allowed six. Four no-hitters were thrown at home, and three were thrown on the road. They threw one in April, one in May, one in July, three in August, and one in September. Of the seven no-hitters, three have been won by a score of 1–0, more common than any other results. The largest margin of victory in a no-hitter was a 7–0 win by Eric Milton in 1999. The smallest margin of victory in a Twins no-hitter came in 1–0 wins – by Johnson in 1920, Kralick in 1962, and Liriano in 2011 – and a 2–1 win by Chance in 1967.

The umpire is also an integral part of any no-hitter. The task of the umpire in a baseball game is to make any decision "which involves judgment, such as, but not limited to, whether a batted ball is fair or foul, whether a pitch is a strike or a ball, or whether a runner is safe or out… [the umpire's judgment on such matters] is final." Part of the duties of the umpire making calls at home plate includes defining the strike zone, which "is defined as that area over homeplate (sic) the upper limit of which is a horizontal line at the midpoint between the top of the shoulders and the top of the uniform pants, and the lower level is a line at the hollow beneath the kneecap." These calls define every baseball game and are therefore integral to the completion of any no-hitter. A different umpire presided over each of the franchise's seven no-hitters. The Twins almost had another no-hitter on August 18, 2020, when the Twins Start pitcher Kenta Maeda Threw 8 innings without any hits allowed. Maeda's no-hitter was broken in the top of the 9th when the Brewers 3rd basemen Eric Sogard softly hit a ball into center field for a base hit. That would be the closest time the Twins had a no-hitter since May 3, 2011, when Francisco Liriano no-hit the Chicago White Sox.

== List of no-hitters in Senators/Twins history ==
¶	Indicates a perfect game
£	Pitcher was left-handed
*	Member of the National Baseball Hall of Fame and Museum

#	Date	Pitcher	Final score	Base- runners	Opponent	Catcher	Plate umpire	Notes	Ref
1	July 1, 1920	Walter Johnson*	1–0	1	@ Boston Red Sox	Val Picinich	Ollie Chill	First no-hitter in franchise history; First no-hitter on the road in franchise history; First right-handed pitcher to throw a no-hitter in franchise history; Smallest margin of victory in a franchise's no-hitter(tie); Only baserunner came on 2B Bucky Harris' error leading off the 7th	
2	August 8, 1931	Bobby Burke^{£}	5–0	5	Boston Red Sox	Roy Spencer	George Moriarty	First no-hitter at home in franchise history; First left-handed pitcher to throw a no-hitter in franchise history; Last no-hitter as the Washington Senators	
3	August 26, 1962	Jack Kralick^{£}	1–0	1	Kansas City Athletics	Earl Battey	Jim Honochick	Smallest margin of victory in a franchise's no-hitter (tie); Only baserunner was a walk in the 9th with one out; Longest interval between no-hitters in franchise history; First no-hitter since moving to Minnesota	
4	August 25, 1967	Dean Chance	2–1	6	@ Cleveland Indians	Jerry Zimmerman	Larry Napp	Second game of a doubleheader; Smallest margin of victory in a franchise's no-hitter (tie); Shortest interval between no-hitters in franchise history; Most baserunners allowed in a franchise's no-hitter (tie); First and only franchise's no-hitter while allowing a run	
5	April 27, 1994	Scott Erickson	6–0	4	Milwaukee Brewers	Matt Walbeck	Dale Scott	Earliest calendar date of franchise's no-hitter	
6	September 11, 1999	Eric Milton^{£}	7–0	2	Anaheim Angels	Terry Steinbach	Tim Welke	Largest margin of victory in a franchise's no-hitter; Latest calendar date of franchise's no-hitter; Most recent no-hitter in Minnesota	
7	May 3, 2011	Francisco Liriano^{£}	1–0	6	@ Chicago White Sox	Drew Butera	Bruce Dreckman	Most recent no-hitter in franchise history; Smallest margin of victory in a franchise's no-hitter (tie); Most baserunners allowed in a franchise's no-hitter (tie)	

== See also ==
- List of Major League Baseball no-hitters
