= List of Minnesota Twins team records =

This is a listing of statistical records and milestone achievements of the Minnesota Twins franchise.

== Single-season records ==
=== Batting ===
Statistic	Player(s)	Number	Year(s)
Batting average	Rod Carew	.388	1977
Home runs	Harmon Killebrew	49	1964, 1969
RBI	Harmon Killebrew	140	1969
Runs	Chuck Knoblauch	140	1996
Hits	Rod Carew	239	1977
Singles	Sam Rice	182	1925
Doubles	Mickey Vernon	51	1946
Triples	Goose Goslin, Cristian Guzmán	20	1925, 2000
Extra base hits	Tony Oliva	84	1964
Stolen bases	Clyde Milan	88	1912
Hit streak	Ken Landreaux	31 games	1980
Base on balls	Eddie Yost	151	1956
Strikeouts	Miguel Sanó	178	2016
Team HR	Team	307	2019

=== Pitching ===
Statistic	Player	Number	Year
Wins	Walter Johnson	36	1913
Strikeouts	Walter Johnson	313	1910
ERA	Walter Johnson	1.14	1913
Saves	Joe Nathan	47	2009

== Single-game records ==
=== Individual ===
- Most strikeouts in a single game: Johan Santana, 17 K in 8 IP, August 19, 2007

=== As a team ===
Record	Number	Occurrences	Opp.^{1}	Date*
AB	50	3	KC	6/19/03
AB^{2}(22)	78	1	CLE	8/31/93
R	24	1	DET	4/24/96
R^{3}	35 (24-11)	1	DET	4/24/96
H	28	1	SEA	6/13/17
H^{2}(11)	24	1	SEA	9/29/89
H^{3}	42	1	OAK	4/27/80
XBH	12	1	TOR	5/8/79
XBH^{3}	24	1	CLE	7/13/96
TB	47	1	WAS	8/29/63
1B	19	1	MIL	9/9/80
1B^{2}(11)	20	1	SEA	9/29/89
2B	8	1	BOS	7/25/96
3B	4	1	NYY	6/2/64
HR	8	1	WAS	8/29/63
HR^{3}	9	Many	MIL	7/12/01
RBI	22	2	CLE	6/4/02
RBI^{3}	33	1	DET	4/24/96
BB	14	3	KC	8/5/06
BB^{2}(18)	18	1	SEA	7/19/69
BB^{3}	21	1	KC	9/10/76
BB^{4}(10)	22	2	BAL	5/15/78
IBB	4	Many	DET	5/23/92
IBB^{2}(22)	5	1	MIL	5/12/72
IBB^{4}(22)	7	1	MIL	5/12/72
K	19	1	TEX	8/19/07
K^{2}(10)	19	2	CLE	7/3/68
K^{3}	27	1	CLE	9/28/00
K^{4}(20)	35	1	WAS	8/9/67
GIDP	5	Many	TEX	6/3/95
GIDP^{2}(22)	5	1	MIL	5/12/72
SH	5	1	CWS	6/23/79
SH^{2}(17)	5	Many	TEX	9/17/77
SF	4	2	DET	6/26/99
SF^{2}	3	2	CLE	7/3/94
HBP	4	2	KC	4/13/71
HBP^{2}(17)	4	1	CLE	5/7/95
LOB	17	2	MIL	9/4/90
LOB^{2}(22)	23	2	MIL	5/12/72
SB	6	1	SEA	9/9/92
Opp. SB	7	2	NYY	5/10/87
Opp. SB^{2}(12)	12	1	OAK	8/1/76
SB^{3}	8	Many	KC	8/26/01
SB^{4}(12)	14	1	OAK	8/1/76
Best Win	21 (23-2)	1	CLE	6/4/02
Worst Loss	18 (20-2)	1	KC	4/25/61
Runs in Inning	11(5th)	Many	BOS	5/20/94
Opp. Runs in Inning	12	1	KC	6/17/03
Record	Number	Occurrences	Opp.^{1}	Date

* Date listed is date of most recent occurrence of record.
^{1} Opponent listed is opponent that record occurred against most recently.
^{2} Indicates record in an extra-inning game (total innings in parentheses).
^{3} Indicates record with number accumulated by both clubs.
^{4} Indicates record in an extra-inning game, with number accumulated by both clubs (total innings in parentheses)

== All-Time leaders ==
=== Batting ===
==== Games played ====
Rank	Player	Number
1	Harmon Killebrew	2,329
2	Sam Rice	2,307
3	Joe Judge	2,084
4	Clyde Milan	1,982
5	Ossie Bluege	1,867

==== At bats ====
Rank	Player	Number
1	Sam Rice	8,934
2	Harmon Killebrew	7,835
3	Joe Judge	7,663
4	Clyde Milan	7,359
5	Kirby Puckett	7,244

==== Runs ====
Rank	Player	Number
1	Sam Rice	1,466
2	Harmon Killebrew	1,258
3	Joe Judge	1,154
4	Kirby Puckett	1,071
5	Buddy Myer	1,037

==== Hits ====
Rank	Player	Number
1	Sam Rice	2,889
2	Kirby Puckett	2,304
3	Joe Judge	2,291
4	Joe Mauer	2,123
5	Clyde Milan	2,100

==== Doubles ====
Rank	Player	Number
1	Sam Rice	479
2	Joe Mauer	428
3	Joe Judge	421
4	Kirby Puckett	414
5	Mickey Vernon	391

==== Triples ====
Rank	Player	Number
1	Sam Rice	183
2	Joe Judge	157
3	Goose Goslin	125
4	Buddy Myer	113
5	Mickey Vernon	108

==== Home runs ====
Rank	Player	Number
1	Harmon Killebrew	559
2	Kent Hrbek	293
3	Bob Allison	256
4	Justin Morneau	221
5	Tony Oliva	220

==== RBI ====
Rank	Player	Number
1	Harmon Killebrew	1,540
2	Kent Hrbek	1,086
3	Kirby Puckett	1,085
4	Sam Rice	1,045
5	Mickey Vernon	1,026

==== Total bases ====
Rank	Player	Number
1	Harmon Killebrew	4,026
2	Sam Rice	3,830
3	Kirby Puckett	3,453
4	Joe Judge	3,239
5	Joe Mauer	3,040

==== Walks ====
Rank	Player	Number
1	Harmon Killebrew	1,505
2	Eddie Yost	1,274
3	Joe Judge	943
4	Joe Mauer	939
5	Buddy Myer	864

==== Strikeouts ====
Rank	Player	Number
1	Harmon Killebrew	1,629
2	Joe Mauer	1,034
3	Bob Allison	1,033
4	Miguel Sanó	1,017
5	Torii Hunter	975
6	Kirby Puckett	965

==== Stolen bases ====
Rank	Player	Number
1	Clyde Milan	495
2	Sam Rice	346
3	George Case	321
4	Chuck Knoblauch	276
5	Rod Carew	271

==== Caught stealing ====
Rank	Player	Number
1	Rod Carew	123
2	George Case	98
3	Buddy Myer	88
4	Ossie Bluege	87
5	César Tovar	81

==== On-base percentage ====
Rank	Player	Amount
1	Rod Carew	.393
2	Chuck Knoblauch	.391
3	John Stone	.389
4	Joe Mauer	.388
5	Buddy Myer	.387

==== Slugging percentage ====
Rank	Player	Amount
1	Harmon Killebrew	.514
2	Goose Goslin	.502
3	Roy Sievers	.500
4	Justin Morneau	.499
5	Kent Hrbek	.481

==== Batting average ====
Rank	Player	Amount
1	Rod Carew	.334
2	Heinie Manush	.328
3	Goose Goslin	.323
3	Sam Rice	.323

=== Pitching ===
==== Wins ====
Rank	Player	Number
1	Walter Johnson	417
2	Jim Kaat	190
3	Bert Blyleven	149
4	Brad Radke	148
5	Camilo Pascual	145

==== Losses ====
Rank	Player	Number
1	Walter Johnson	279
2	Jim Kaat	159
3	Camilo Pascual	141
4	Brad Radke	139
5	Bert Blyleven	138

==== ERA ====
Rank	Player	Number
1	Walter Johnson	2.17
2	Doc Ayers	2.64
3	Dean Chance	2.67
4	Cy Falkenberg	2.69
5	Harry Harper	2.75

==== Games played ====
Rank	Player	Number
1	Walter Johnson	802
2	Eddie Guardado	648
3	Rick Aguilera	490
4	Jim Kaat	484
5	Firpo Marberry	470

==== Games started ====
Rank	Player	Number
1	Walter Johnson	666
2	Jim Kaat	433
3	Brad Radke	377
4	Bert Blyleven	345
5	Camilo Pascual	331

==== Complete games ====
Rank	Player	Number
1	Walter Johnson	531
2	Case Patten	206
3	Bert Blyleven	141
4	Long Tom Hughes	139
5	Jim Kaat	133

==== Shutouts ====
Rank	Player	Number
1	Walter Johnson	110
2	Camilo Pascual	31
3	Bert Blyleven	29
4	Jim Kaat	23
4	Dutch Leonard	23

==== Saves ====
Rank	Player	Number
1	Joe Nathan	260
2	Rick Aguilera	254
3	Glen Perkins	120
4	Eddie Guardado	116
5	Ron Davis	108

==== Innings pitched ====
Rank	Player	Number
1	Walter Johnson	5,914 1/3
2	Jim Kaat	3014 1/3
3	Bert Blyleven	2566 2/3
4	Camilo Pascual	2,465
5	Brad Radke	2,451

== Rare feats ==
=== No-hitters ===
Minnesota
Pitcher	Opp.	Date
Francisco Liriano	@CHW	5/3/2011
Eric Milton	ANA	9/11/1999
Scott Erickson	MIL	4/27/1994
Dean Chance	@CLE	8/25/1967
Jack Kralick	KC	8/26/1962
Bobby Burke	BOS	8/8/1931
Walter Johnson	@BOS	7/1/1920

Dean Chance also threw a perfect game through five innings on August 6, 1967, against the Boston Red Sox, but the game was shortened due to rain. Under MLB rule revisions in 1991, it is not recognized as an official no-hitter or perfect game.

=== Hit for the cycle ===
Minnesota
Player	Opp.	Date	Byron Buxton	PIT	7/12/25
Jorge Polanco	PHI	4/5/19			
Michael Cuddyer	MIL	5/22/09			
Jason Kubel	LAA	4/17/09			
Carlos Gómez	@CWS	5/7/08			
Kirby Puckett	OAK	8/1/86			
Gary Ward	@MIL	9/18/80			
Mike Cubbage	TOR	7/27/78			
Lyman Bostock	@CWS	7/24/76			
Larry Hisle	@BAL	6/4/76			
César Tovar	TEX	9/19/72			
Rod Carew	@KC	5/20/70			
Mickey Vernon	@CWS	5/19/46			
Joe Cronin	NYY	9/2/29			
Goose Goslin	@NYY	8/28/24			
Otis Clymer	@NYY	10/2/08			

=== Triple plays ===
Players	Opp.	Date
Sano–Simmons–Gordon	@KC	6/06/21
Buxton-Urshela-Urshela	@CWS	7/04/22
Sano–Schoop–Cron	ATL	8/07/19
Arraez–Schoop–Sano	@NYY	7/22/19
Sano–Dozier–Mauer	@LAA	6/1/17
Castillo–Morneau–Batista	SEA	5/27/06
Gaetti–Newman–Hrbek	@BOS	7/17/90†
Gaetti-Newman-Hrbek	@BOS	7/17/90†
Gladden–Lombardozzi–Larkin	CLE	8/8/88
Gaetti–Lombardozzi–Hrbek	@NYY	4/5/88
Gaetti–Teufel–Hrbek	@NYY	7/19/84
Gaetti-Castino-Hrbek	@CAL	8/8/83
Butera–Gaetti–Hrbek	NYY	5/29/82
Borgmann–Gómez	@CWS	7/25/76
Rollins–Carew–Allison	CLE	9/10/68
Rollins–Tovar–Killebrew	CAL	8/18/66

†See below

=== Six-hit games ===
Batter	Opp.	Date
Kirby Puckett	TEX	5/23/91
Kirby Puckett	@MIL	8/30/87

== Major League Baseball records and firsts ==
- First team to record two triple plays in the same game: July 17, 1990 vs. Boston Red Sox (lost game 1–0).
- First team to reach the playoffs after losing 100 games the previous year.
- On August 31, 2019 Mitch Garver hit his 20th HR of the season, becoming the 8th Twins player to hit 20 or more home runs in a season. This sets an MLB record.
- On September 17, 2019 Miguel Sano hit his 30th HR of the season, becoming the 5th Twins player to hit 30 or more home runs in a season. This sets an MLB record.
- Longest postseason losing streak: 18 games (2004–2020).
