= Minnesota Twins award winners and league leaders =

This is a list of award winners and league leaders for the Minnesota Twins professional baseball team.

== Award winners ==
=== Most Valuable Player (AL) ===
- 1913 – Walter Johnson
- 1924 – Walter Johnson
- 1925 – Roger Peckinpaugh
- 1965 – Zoilo Versalles
- 1969 – Harmon Killebrew
- 1977 – Rod Carew
- 2006 – Justin Morneau
- 2009 – Joe Mauer

=== Cy Young (AL) ===
- 1970 – Jim Perry
- 1988 – Frank Viola
- 2004 – Johan Santana
- 2006 – Johan Santana

=== Rookie of the Year (AL) ===
- 1958 – Albie Pearson
- 1959 – Bob Allison
- 1964 – Tony Oliva
- 1967 – Rod Carew
- 1979 – John Castino (shared with Alfredo Griffin)
- 1991 – Chuck Knoblauch
- 1995 – Marty Cordova

=== Manager of the Year (AL) ===
- 1991 – Tom Kelly
- 2010 – Ron Gardenhire
- 2019 - Rocco Baldelli

=== Gold Glove Award (AL) ===
Pitcher

- Jim Kaat [12] (1962–72, Twins, 1973 Twins-White Sox)
- Johan Santana (2007)

Catcher

- Earl Battey [3] (1960–62)
- Joe Mauer (2008–2010)

First base

- Vic Power [3] (1962-63 Twins, 1964 Twins-Angels)
- Doug Mientkiewicz (2001)
- Carlos Santana (2024)
- Ty France (2025)

Second base

- Brian Dozier (2017)
- Chuck Knoblauch (1997)

Third base

- Gary Gaetti [4] (1986–89)

Shortstop

- Zoilo Versalles [2] (1963, 1965)

Outfield

- Byron Buxton (2017)
- Torii Hunter [7] (2001–2007)
- Kirby Puckett [6] (1986–89, 1991–92)
- Tony Oliva (1966)

=== Wilson Defensive Player of the Year Award ===
Team (at all positions) (Note: See explanatory note at Atlanta Braves award winners and league leaders#Wilson Defensive Player of the Year Award)

- (2012)
- (2013)

=== Silver Slugger (AL) ===
DH

- Paul Molitor (1996)
- Nelson Cruz (2019)

Catcher

- Joe Mauer [4] (2006–2010)
- Mitch Garver (2019)

First baseman

- Justin Morneau [2] (2006, 2008)

Second baseman

- Chuck Knoblauch [2] (1995,1997)

Third baseman

- none

Shortstop

- none

Outfielders

- Kirby Puckett [6] (1986–89, 1992, 1994)
- Josh Willingham (2012)
- Byron Buxton (2025)

Utility player

- Luis Arráez (2022)

=== Edgar Martínez Award ===
- Chili Davis (1991)
- Paul Molitor (1996)
- Nelson Cruz (2019)

=== Roberto Clemente Award ===
- Rod Carew (1977)
- Dave Winfield (1994)
- Kirby Puckett (1996)
- Nelson Cruz (2021)

=== Major League Triple Crown: Pitching ===
- Johan Santana (2006)

=== Triple Crown (AL): Pitching ===
- Johan Santana (2006)

=== DHL Hometown Heroes (2006) ===
DHL Hometown Heroes:

- Kirby Puckett — voted by MLB fans as the most outstanding player in the history of the franchise, based on on-field performance, leadership quality and character value

=== All-Star Game MVP Award ===
Major League Baseball All-Star Game MVP Award (Note: This was re-named the Ted Williams Most Valuable Player Award in 2002)

- Kirby Puckett (1993)

=== All-Stars ===
Major League Baseball All-Star Game:

Catcher

- Earl Battey [4] (1962, 63, 65, 66)
- Joe Mauer [4] (2006, 08, 09, 10)
- Butch Wynegar [2] (1976, 77)
- Dave Engle (1984)
- Tim Laudner (1988)
- A. J. Pierzynski (2002)
- John Roseboro (1969)
- Kurt Suzuki (2014)

First Baseman

- Justin Morneau [4] (2007–10)
- Rod Carew [3] (1976–78)
- Harmon Killebrew [3] (1967–69)
- Bob Allison (1963)
- Ron Coomer (1999)
- Kent Hrbek (1982)

Second Baseman

- Rod Carew [9] (1967–75)
- Chuck Knoblauch [4] (1992, 94, 96, 97)
- Brian Dozier (2015)

Third Baseman

- Harmon Killebrew [5] (1961, 65, 66, 70, 71)
- Gary Gaetti [2] (1988, 89)
- Rich Rollins (1962)

Shortstop

- Zoilo Versalles [2] (1963, 65)
- Leo Cárdenas (1971)
- Cristian Guzmán (2001)
- Roy Smalley (1979)
- Eduardo Nunez (2016)
- Jorge Polanco (2019)

Outfield

- Byron Buxton [3] (2022, 2025-26)
- Kirby Puckett [10] (1986–95)
- Tony Oliva [8] (1964–71)
- Jimmie Hall [2] (1964, 65)
- Torii Hunter [2] (2002, 07)
- Bob Allison (1964)
- Tom Brunansky (1985)
- Larry Hisle (1977)
- Harmon Killebrew (1963)
- Ken Landreaux (1980)
- Matt Lawton (2000)
- Gary Ward (1983)
- Michael Cuddyer (2011)

Designated Hitter

- Nelson Cruz (2021)

Pitcher

- Joe Ryan [2] (2025–26)
- Camilo Pascual [3] (1961–62, 64)
- Joe Nathan [4] (2004, 05, 08, 09)
- Rick Aguilera [3] (1991–93)
- Johan Santana [3] (2005–07)
- Glen Perkins [3] (2013, 14, 15)
- Eddie Guardado [2] (2002, 03)
- Jim Kaat [2] (1962, 66)
- Jim Perry [2] (1970, 71)
- José Berríos [2] (2018, 2019)
- Bert Blyleven (1973)
- Dean Chance (1967)
- Doug Corbett (1981)
- Mudcat Grant (1965)
- Francisco Liriano (2006)
- Joe Mays (2001)
- Eric Milton (2001)
- Jack Morris (1991)
- Brad Radke (1998)
- Jeff Reardon (1988)
- Frank Viola (1988)
- Jake Odorizzi (2019)

=== Sports Illustrated MLB All-Decade Team (2009) ===
- Joe Mauer, catcher
- David Ortiz, designated hitter (Twins–Red Sox)
- Johan Santana, starting pitcher (Twins–Mets)

=== Baseball America Major League Player of the Year ===
- Joe Mauer (2009)

=== Baseball America Manager of the Year ===
- Ron Gardenhire (2008)

=== Chuck Tanner Major League Baseball Manager of the Year Award ===
- Ron Gardenhire (2009)

== Other achievements ==
=== BBWAA chapter awards ===
- (Note: See also: "Terry Ryan Award". Play Ball! Minnesota official website. Minnesota Twins Community Fund. "The winner is presented with the [Terry Ryan Award] at the annual Baseball Writers' Association of America Diamond Awards along with many other prestigious Twins awards.")

== Team award ==
- 1924 – American League pennant (as Washington Senators)
- 1924 – World Series championship (as Washington Senators)
- 1925 – American League pennant (as Washington Senators)
- 1933 – American League pennant (as Washington Senators)
- 1965 – American League pennant (as Minnesota Twins)
- 1987 – William Harridge Trophy (American League champion)
- 1987 – Commissioner's Trophy (World Series)
- 1991 – William Harridge Trophy (American League champion)
- 1991 – Commissioner's Trophy (World Series)
- 2002 – Baseball America Organization of the Year
- 2004 – Baseball America Organization of the Year

| Preceded by New York Yankees; 1923 | World Series Champions; Washington Senators; 1924 | Succeeded by Pittsburgh Pirates; 1925 |
| Preceded by New York Mets; 1986 | World Series Champions; Minnesota Twins; 1987 | Succeeded by Los Angeles Dodgers; 1988 |
| Preceded by Cincinnati Reds; 1990 | World Series Champions; Minnesota Twins; 1991 | Succeeded by Toronto Blue Jays; 1992 and 1993 |
| Preceded by New York Yankees; 1921, 1922, and 1923 | American League Champions; Washington Senators; 1924 and 1925 | Succeeded by New York Yankees; 1926, 1927, and 1928 |
| Preceded by New York Yankees; 1932 | American League Champions; Washington Senators; 1933 | Succeeded by Detroit Tigers; 1934 and 1935 |
| Preceded by New York Yankees; 1960, 1961, 1962, 1963, and 1964 | American League Champions; Minnesota Twins; 1965 | Succeeded by Baltimore Orioles; 1966 |
| Preceded by Boston Red Sox; 1986 | American League Champions; Minnesota Twins; 1987 | Succeeded by Oakland Athletics; 1988, 1989, and 1990 |
| Preceded by Oakland Athletics; 1988, 1989, and 1990 | American League Champions; Minnesota Twins; 1991 | Succeeded by Toronto Blue Jays; 1992 and 1993 |

== League leaders ==
=== Batting ===
==== Home Runs ====
- 1969 – Harmon Killebrew (49)
- 1967 – Harmon Killebrew (44)
- 1964 – Harmon Killebrew (49)
- 1963 – Harmon Killebrew (45)
- 1962 – Harmon Killebrew (48)

==== Runs Batted In ====
- 1994 – Kirby Puckett (112)
- 1977 – Larry Hisle (119)
- 1971 – Harmon Killebrew (119)
- 1969 – Harmon Killebrew (140)
- 1962 – Harmon Killebrew (126)

==== Batting average ====
- 2009 – Joe Mauer (.365)*
- 2008 – Joe Mauer (.328)
- 2006 – Joe Mauer (.347)**
- 1989 – Kirby Puckett (.339)
- 1978 – Rod Carew (.333)
- 1977 – Rod Carew (.388)
- 1975 – Rod Carew (.359)
- 1974 – Rod Carew (.364)
- 1973 – Rod Carew (.350)
- 1972 – Rod Carew (.318)
- 1971 – Tony Oliva (.337)
- 1969 – Rod Carew (.332)
- 1965 – Tony Oliva (.321)
- 1964 – Tony Oliva (.323)

* Highest batting average for a catcher in MLB History
** First AL catcher to win batting title

=== Pitching ===
==== Wins ====
- 2006 – Johan Santana (19)*
- 1991 – Scott Erickson (20)*
- 1988 – Frank Viola (24)
- 1977 – Dave Goltz (20)*
- 1970 – Jim Perry (24)*
- 1966 – Jim Kaat (25)
- 1965 – Mudcat Grant (21)

* Tied for league lead

==== ERA ====
- 2006 – Johan Santana (2.77)
- 2004 – Johan Santana (2.61)
- 1988 – Allan Anderson (2.45)

==== Strikeouts ====
- 2006 – Johan Santana (245)
- 2005 – Johan Santana (238)
- 2004 – Johan Santana (265)
- 1985 – Bert Blyleven (206)*
- 1963 – Camilo Pascual (202)
- 1962 – Camilo Pascual (206)
- 1961 – Camilo Pascual (221)

* Includes statistics while with Cleveland Indians

==== Saves ====
- 2002 – Eddie Guardado (45)
- 1979 – Mike Marshall (32)
- 1970 – Ron Perranoski (34)
- 1969 – Ron Perranoski (31)
- 1968 – Al Worthington (18)

== See also ==
- Baseball awards
- List of MLB awards
