= Nathan Martorella =

American baseball player (born 2001)

Lancaster Stormers – No. 25
- First baseman
- Born: February 18, 2001 (age 25); Monterey, California, U.S.
- Bats: Left Throws: Left
- Stats at Baseball Reference

Nathan Adam Martorella (born February 18, 2001) is an American professional baseball first baseman for the Lancaster Stormers of the Atlantic League of Professional Baseball.

== Amateur career ==
Martorella attended Salinas High School in Salinas, California, and played college baseball for the California Golden Bears baseball team. During the summer of 2021, he played in the Cape Cod Baseball League for the Cotuit Kettleers. As a junior in 2022, he hit .333 with 11 home runs and 46 RBIs over 55 starts.

== Professional career ==
=== San Diego Padres ===
Martorella was selected by the San Diego Padres in the fifth round with the 150th overall pick in the 2022 Major League Baseball draft.

Martorella signed and split his first professional season between the Arizona Complex League Padres and the Lake Elsinore Storm, hitting .322 over 28 games. He opened the 2023 season with the Fort Wayne TinCaps. In mid-August, he was promoted to the San Antonio Missions. Over 135 games, he slashed .255/.361/.437 with 19 home runs, 88 RBI, and thirty doubles. He was selected to play in the Arizona Fall League for the Peoria Javelinas after the season. Martorella was assigned back to San Antonio to open the 2024 season.

=== Miami Marlins ===
On May 4, 2024, Martorella was traded to the Miami Marlins alongside Dillon Head, Jakob Marsee, and Woo-suk Go in exchange for Luis Arráez and cash considerations. He was assigned to the Pensacola Blue Wahoos, with whom he ended the season. Over 127 games between San Antonio and Pensacola, he batted .229 with 18 home runs and 55 RBI. Martorella returned to Pensacola to open the 2025 season. In August, he was promoted to the Triple-A Jacksonville Jumbo Shrimp. Martorella played in 133 games for the season and hit .202 with 14 home runs and 62 RBI. He returned to Jacksonville to open the 2026 season and batted .156 across 28 games. On June 2, 2026, Martorella was released by the Marlins organization.

=== Lancaster Stormers ===
Following his release by the Marlins, Martorella signed with the Lancaster Stormers of the Atlantic League of Professional Baseball.
