= Dillon Head =

American baseball player (born 2004)

Miami Marlins
- Outfielder
- Born: October 11, 2004 (age 22); Chicago, Illinois, U.S.
- Bats: Left Throws: Left

Dillon Head (born October 11, 2004) is an American professional baseball outfielder in the Miami Marlins organization.

== Amateur career ==
Head grew up in Glenwood, Illinois. He attended middle school at James Hart Middle School and graduated from Homewood-Flossmoor High School. He batted .467 with six home runs, 28 RBIs, and 35 stolen bases as a junior. Head committed to play college baseball at Clemson.

== Professional career ==
=== San Diego Padres ===
Head was selected by the San Diego Padres in the first round, with the 25th overall selection, of the 2023 Major League Baseball draft. On June 18, 2023, Head signed with the Padres on an under slot deal worth $2.8 million. He made his professional debut after signing with the rookie-level Arizona Complex League Padres and also played with the Single–A Lake Elsinore Storm, hitting .267 with one home run over 27 games. He was assigned back to Lake Elsinore to open the 2025 season.

=== Miami Marlins ===
On May 4, 2024, the Padres traded Head to the Miami Marlins alongside Jakob Marsee, Nathan Martorella, and Woo-suk Go in exchange for Luis Arráez and cash considerations. He was assigned to the Single–A Jupiter Hammerheads and rehabbed with the rookie–level Florida Complex League Marlins. On June 19, it was announced that Head would be undergoing a left femoral acetabular impingement procedure, causing him to miss the remainder of the year. Over 26 games for the 2024 season, Head hit .243 with two home runs and 11 RBIs. Head opened the 2025 season with Jupiter and was promoted to the High–A Beloit Sky Carp in August. Over 97 games between the two teams, he hit .224 with four home runs, 39 RBIs, and 37 stolen bases. Head returned to Beloit for the 2026 season and batted .248 with seven home runs, 36 RBIs, and 41 stolen bases across 90 games.
