= T.C. Bear =

Mascot for the Minnesota Twins

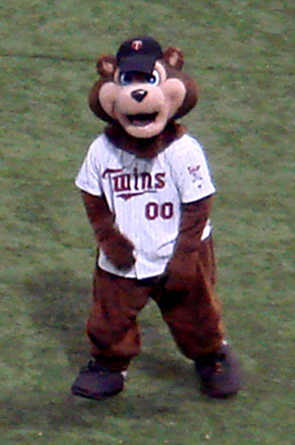
- T.C. Bear in 2007
- Team: Minnesota Twins
- Description: Bear
- Origin of name: Twin Cities
- First seen: April 3, 2000
- Related mascot(s): Twinkie
- Website: Official website

T.C. Bear, or simply T.C., is the costumed character mascot for the Minnesota Twins. Taking the form of an anthropomorphized American black bear, the furry mascot’s initials "T.C." stand for the Twin Cities—the metropolitan area of Minneapolis and Saint Paul—and match the interlocking letters on the team's primary cap insignia. T.C. makes appearances at the team’s home games at Target Field and at community events.

== History ==
The Minnesota Twins franchise of Major League Baseball briefly had a mascot from 1980 to 1981, a loon named "Twinkie". T.C. Bear was first introduced to the team's fans on April 3, 2000, at the beginning of the Twin's 2000 season. The mascot character is loosely modeled after the Hamm's Beer Bear, a mascot used in advertisements for Hamm's Brewery, an early sponsor for the Twins. The bear character was also chosen for its appeal to children.

The original person who portrayed T.C. Bear, Greg Wilfahrt, was fired after the 2019 season. For the 2021 Major League Baseball season, two new actors (who were said to play T.C. the year before but only made minor appearances due to the COVID-19 pandemic not allowing fans inside the stadium) started portraying him full time and his mouth slightly changed and his tongue is less visible.

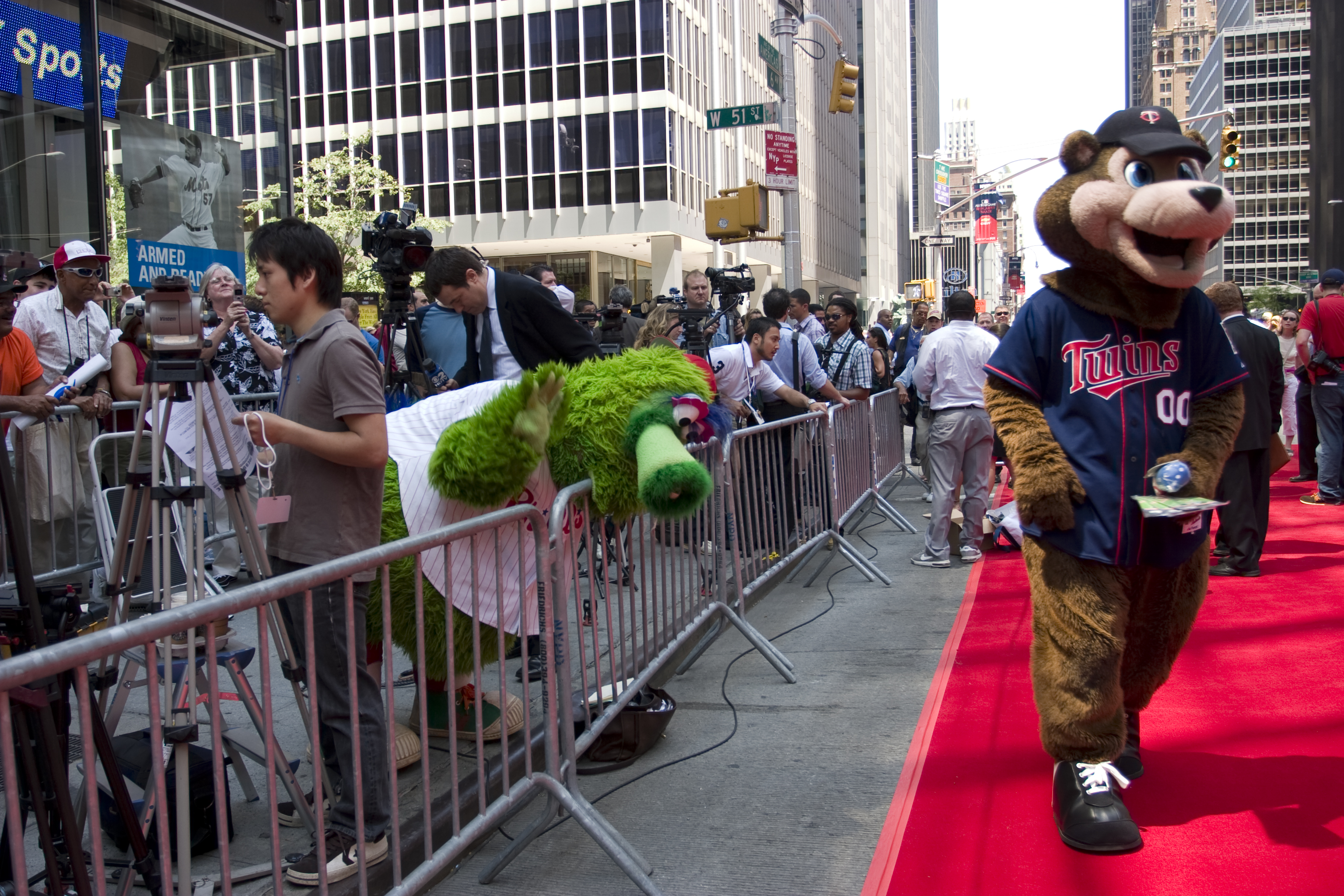
T.C. Bear at the 2008 MLB All-Star Game

== Legacy ==
The team installed a statue in 2014 of T.C. outside of Target Field where the team plays. T.C. was a candidate for inclusion in the Mascot Hall of Fame in 2020, but finished third in voting to the Oriole Bird and Youppi! who were inducted.

== See also ==
- History of the Minnesota Twins
- List of Major League Baseball mascots
