= Woo-suk Go =

South Korean baseball player (born 1998)

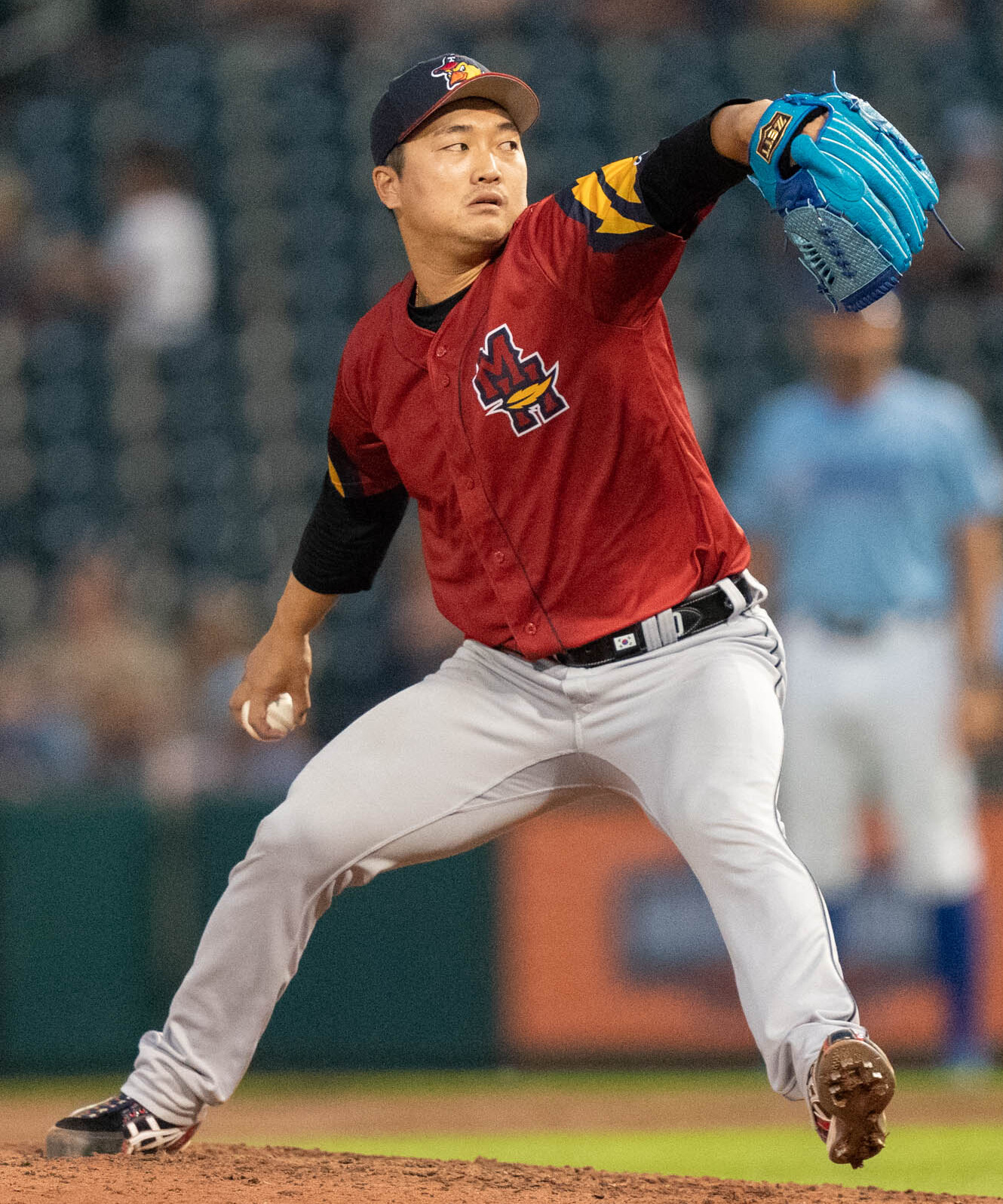
- Go with the Toledo Mud Hens in 2025

LG Twins – No. 19
- Pitcher
- Born: August 6, 1998 (age 28); Incheon, South Korea
- Bats: Right Throws: Right

Professional debut
- KBO: April 16, 2017, for the LG Twins
- MLB: July 9, 2026, for the Minnesota Twins

KBO statistics (through 2026 season)
- Win–loss record: 22–27
- Earned run average: 3.08
- Strikeouts: 429
- Saves: 140

MLB statistics (through 2026 season)
- Win–loss record: 0–0
- Earned run average: 9.00
- Strikeouts: 5
- Stats at Baseball Reference

Teams
- LG Twins (2017–2023); Minnesota Twins (2026); LG Twins (2026–present)

Career highlights and awards
- KBO saves leader (2022)

- Woo-suk Go
- Hangul: 고우석
- RR: Go Useok
- MR: Ko Usŏk

Woo-suk Go (Korean: 고우석; born August 6, 1998) is a South Korean professional baseball pitcher for the LG Twins of the KBO League. He has previously played in Major League Baseball (MLB) for the Minnesota Twins. He competed in the 2020 Summer Olympics and the 2022 Asian Games.

== Career ==
=== LG Twins ===
Go made his KBO League debut with the LG Twins in 2017 and became the Twins' closer in 2019.

On October 8, 2022, Go faced Lee Dae-ho of the Lotte Giants in his final professional game. In the contest, Lee appeared as a pitcher, and got Go to ground out to him on a comebacker to the mound.

From 2019 to 2023, Go pitched to a 2.39 earned run average and recorded 139 saves, leading the KBO League, and 334 strikeouts to 115 walks in 275 1/3 innings pitched. The Twins agreed to allow Go to negotiate with Major League Baseball teams following the 2023 KBO League season via the posting system.

=== San Diego Padres ===
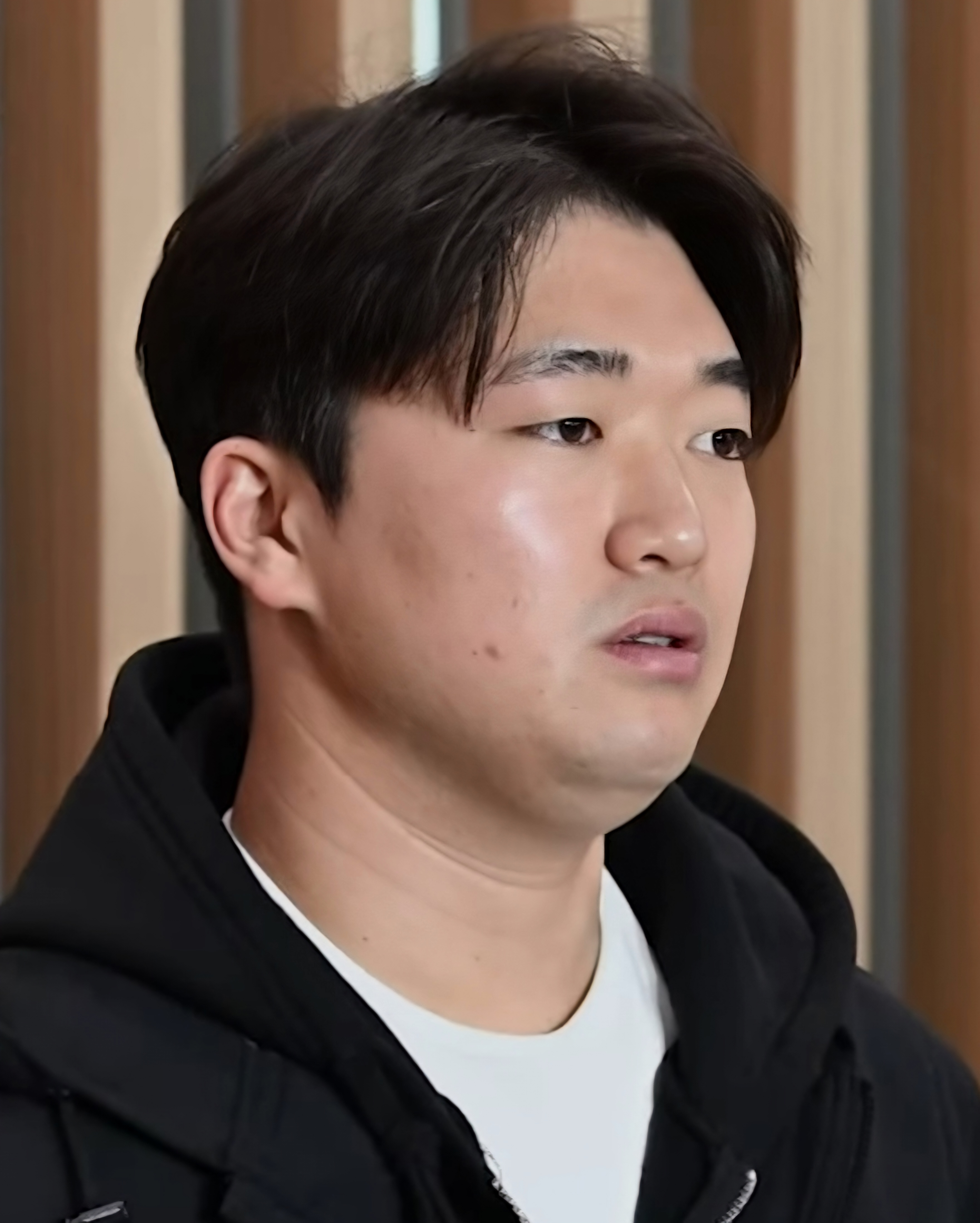
Go in 2024

On January 3, 2024, Go signed a two-year, $4.5 million contract with the San Diego Padres. He was optioned to the Double–A San Antonio Missions to begin the 2024 season. In 10 appearances for the Missions, Go logged an 0–2 record and 4.38 ERA with 15 strikeouts and one save across 12 1/3 innings pitched.

=== Miami Marlins ===
On May 4, 2024, the Padres traded Go, Jakob Marsee, Nathan Martorella, and Dillon Head to the Miami Marlins in exchange for Luis Arráez and cash considerations. On May 30, Go was designated for assignment by the Marlins. He cleared waivers and was sent outright to the Triple–A Jacksonville Jumbo Shrimp on June 4. Go split the remainder of the year between Jacksonville and the Double-A Pensacola Blue Wahoos, making 34 total appearances.

Go split the 2025 season between the rookie-level Florida Complex League Marlins, Single-A Jupiter Hammerheads, High-A Beloit Snappers, and Jacksonville. In 12 appearances for the four affiliates, he compiled an aggregate 0–1 record and 4.11 ERA with 14 strikeouts across 15 1/3 innings pitched. Go was released by the Marlins organization on June 17, 2025.

=== Detroit Tigers ===
On June 23, 2025, Go signed a minor league contract with the Detroit Tigers. He pitched primarily for the Triple-A Toledo Mud Hens, posting a 1–0 record and 4.29 ERA with 22 strikeouts and three saves in 14 games; Go also made six appearances for the High-A West Michigan Whitecaps, but struggled to a 6.00 ERA with one strikeout over six innings pitched. Go elected free agency following the season on November 6.

On December 16, 2025, Go re-signed with the Tigers organization on a minor league contract. In 2026, he made 27 appearances split between Toledo and the Double-A Erie SeaWolves, posting a cumulative 3–1 record and 1.96 ERA with 54 strikeouts and four saves across 41 1/3 innings pitched.

=== Minnesota Twins ===
On July 5, 2026, Go was traded to the Minnesota Twins in exchange for cash considerations; two days later, he was selected to the 40–man roster and promoted to the major leagues for the first time. After four appearances, he was sent to the Triple-A St. Paul Saints, where he was ejected prior to his first appearance on July 24, due to umpires finding a foreign substance in his glove. On July 26, Go was ultimately handed a 10-game suspension. On August 2, his suspension was reduced to an eight–match ban. This is the first time in MLB and MLB in the U.S. that penalties for caught illegal pitching have been relaxed. Go made four total appearances for Minnesota, recording a 9.00 ERA with five strikeouts over four innings of work. He was designated for assignment by the Twins on August 28. He cleared waivers and elected free agency on August 30.

=== LG Twins (second stint) ===
On September 1, 2026, Go signed with the LG Twins of the KBO League.

== Pitching style ==
As a reliever, Go throws a fastball averaging 94–95 miles per hour (151–153 km/h), maxing out at 98 miles per hour (158 km/h), and a slider as his primary pitches.

== Personal life ==
Go married Lee Ga-hyun, daughter of Lee Jong-beom and sister of Jung-hoo Lee. They have a son.
