= Jakob Marsee =

American baseball player (born 2001)

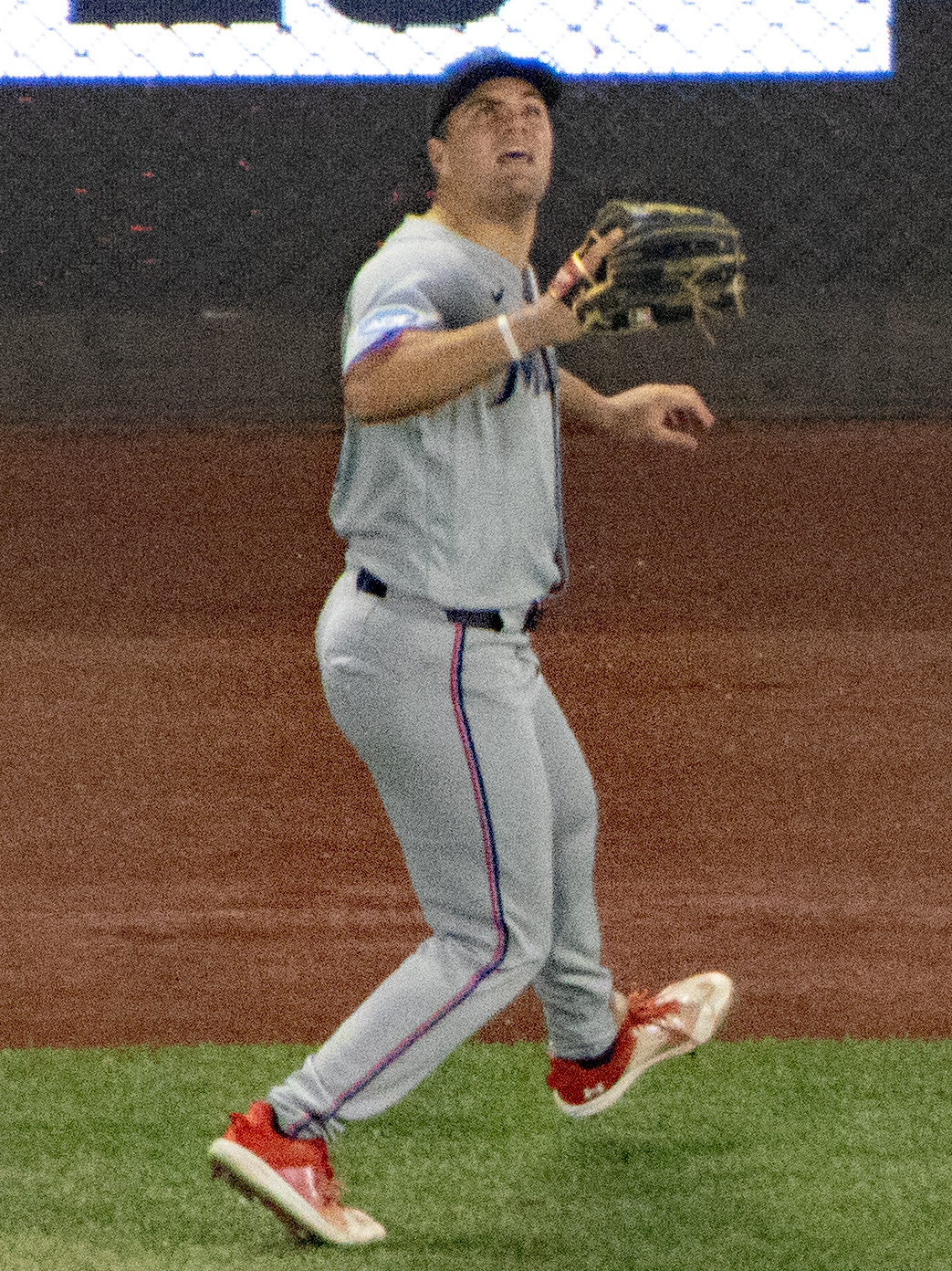
- Marsee with the Miami Marlins in 2026

Miami Marlins – No. 87
- Outfielder
- Born: June 28, 2001 (age 25); Dearborn, Michigan, U.S.
- Bats: Left Throws: Left

MLB debut
- August 1, 2025, for the Miami Marlins

MLB statistics (through 2026 season)
- Batting average: .248
- Home runs: 16
- Runs batted in: 74
- Stats at Baseball Reference

Teams
- Miami Marlins (2025–present)

Jakob Joseph Marsee (born June 28, 2001) is an American professional baseball outfielder for the Miami Marlins of Major League Baseball (MLB). He made his MLB debut in 2025.

== Career ==
=== Amateur career ===
Marsee attended Allen Park High School in Allen Park, Michigan, and played college baseball at Central Michigan University. For three seasons he played summer league baseball in the Northwoods League, first with the Great Lakes Resorters (a temporary team formed to limit travel in the COVID-19 pandemic) in 2020, then with the Kokomo Jackrabbits in 2021 and finally with the Traverse City Pit Spitters in 2022.

=== San Diego Padres ===
Marsee was drafted by the San Diego Padres in the sixth round of the 2022 Major League Baseball draft. He signed with the Padres and started his professional career that year with the Arizona Complex League Padres and Lake Elsinore Storm.

Marsee began 2023 with the High-A Fort Wayne TinCaps. In 129 appearances split between Fort Wayne and the Double-A San Antonio Missions, he batted .274/.413/.428 with 16 home runs, 46 RBI, and 46 stolen bases.

=== Miami Marlins ===
On May 4, 2024, Marsee was traded to the Miami Marlins alongside Dillon Head, Nathan Martorella, and Woo-suk Go in exchange for Luis Arráez and cash considerations. Marsee and Martorella learned they were being traded while on base at the top of the third inning in a game with the San Antonio Missions. He played in 91 games for the Double-A Pensacola Blue Wahoos, hitting .188 with seven home runs, 37 RBI, and 32 stolen bases; in 22 games for the Triple-A Jacksonville Jumbo Shrimp, he batted .275 with one home run, five RBI, and seven stolen bases.

Marsee made 98 appearances for the Jumbo Shrimp to begin the 2025 season, slashing .246/.379/.438 with 14 home runs, 37 RBI, and 47 stolen bases. On August 1, 2025, Marsee was selected to the 40-man roster and promoted to the major leagues for the first time. In his MLB debut against the New York Yankees, Marsee recorded his first career hit, as well as three walks. On August 5, he hit his first career home run off of AJ Blubaugh of the Houston Astros. Marsee won National League Rookie of the Month for August 2025.

Awards
Preceded by Isaac Collins	National League Rookie of the Month; August 2025	Most recent
