= Ken Landreaux =

American baseball player (born 1954)

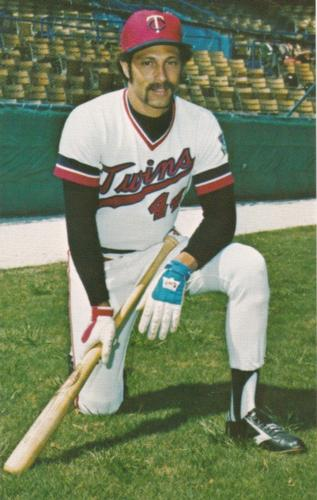
- Center fielder
- Born: December 22, 1954 (age 71); Los Angeles, California, U.S.
- Batted: Left Threw: Right

MLB debut
- September 11, 1977, for the California Angels

Last MLB appearance
- October 4, 1987, for the Los Angeles Dodgers

MLB statistics
- Batting average: .268
- Home runs: 91
- Runs batted in: 479
- Stats at Baseball Reference

Teams
- California Angels (1977–1978); Minnesota Twins (1979–1980); Los Angeles Dodgers (1981–1987)

Career highlights and awards
- All-Star (1980); World Series champion (1981)

Kenneth Francis Landreaux (born December 22, 1954) is an American former professional baseball center fielder. He played in Major League Baseball for the California Angels, Minnesota Twins, and Los Angeles Dodgers from 1977 through 1987.

== Playing career ==
After graduating from Dominguez High School in Compton, California, Landreaux was drafted by the Houston Astros in the eighth round of the 1973 Major League Baseball draft, but chose to attend Arizona State University. While at Arizona State, he played in the 1975 and 1976 College World Series on teams that included future major leaguers Floyd Bannister, Chris Bando, and Bob Horner.

Landreaux was selected by the California Angels in the first round of the 1976 Major League Baseball draft. In his major league debut with the Angels, on September 11, 1977, against the Chicago White Sox, Landreaux threw out three base runners from the outfield.

In 1979, the Angels traded Landreaux, Dave Engle, Paul Hartzell, and Brad Havens to the Minnesota Twins for Rod Carew. In 1980, Landreaux set a Minnesota record with a 31-game hitting streak, tied for the longest in the AL since Dom DiMaggio's 34 in 1949. He still holds the record for most consecutive games with a hit in Minnesota Twins history.

Landreaux was traded to the Los Angeles Dodgers for three prospects (Mickey Hatcher and two minor leaguers) in 1981. Landreaux was a member of the 1981 World Series champion Los Angeles Dodgers, and caught the final out of the 1981 World Series, a fly ball to center field off the bat of Bob Watson. Landreaux's best seasons were 1982 and 1983. Usually batting 2nd in the order, he combined with leadoff man Steve Sax to give the Dodgers two formidable "table setters." Landreaux hit over .280 and had at least 30 stolen bases in each of those seasons. He also hit a career high 17 home runs for the 1983 National League Western Division champion Dodgers. He remained with the Dodgers, completing his major league baseball career in 1987.

== Career statistics ==
In 1264 games over 11 seasons, Landreaux compiled a .268 batting average (1099-for-4101) with 522 runs, 180 doubles, 45 triples, 91 home runs, 479 RBI, 145 stolen bases, 299 base on balls, 421 strikeouts, .317 on-base percentage and .400 slugging percentage. Defensively, he recorded a .981 fielding percentage at all three outfield positions. In postseason play covering 24 games, he batted .221 (15-for-68) with 6 runs and 4 RBI.

== Post-playing career ==
After retiring, he worked as a counselor at Bellwood Health Center in Bellflower, California. He and Darrell Jackson, a former baseball teammate, founded the Athletic Connection Team to aid athletes with substance use problems. Landreaux spends his time teaching young baseball players at the Urban Youth Academy in Compton. Ken Landreaux returned to Arizona State University in 2012 and earned a Bachelor of Liberal Studies Degree in 2014.

== Personal life ==
Landreaux is a cousin of former major league third baseman Enos Cabell.
