= Luis Arráez =

Venezuelan baseball player (born 1997)

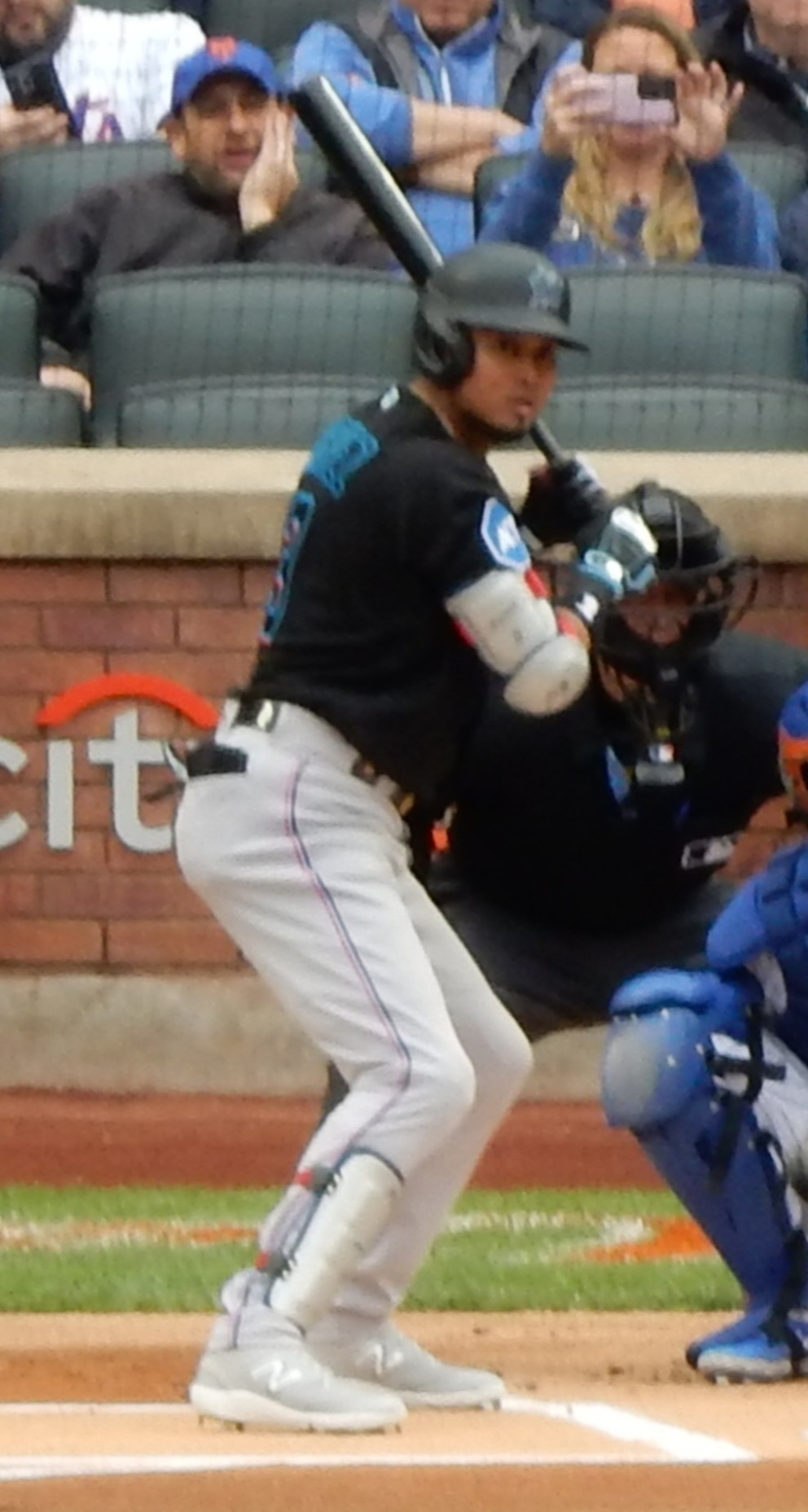
- Arráez with the Miami Marlins in 2023

Free agent
- Infielder
- Born: April 9, 1997 (age 29); San Felipe, Venezuela
- Bats: Left Throws: Right

MLB debut
- May 18, 2019, for the Minnesota Twins

MLB statistics (through 2026 season)
- Batting average: .316
- Hits: 1,213
- Home runs: 42
- Runs batted in: 372
- Stats at Baseball Reference

Teams
- Minnesota Twins (2019–2022); Miami Marlins (2023–2024); San Diego Padres (2024–2025); San Francisco Giants (2026); Philadelphia Phillies (2026)

Career highlights and awards
- 4× All-Star (2022–2024, 2026); 2× Silver Slugger Award (2022, 2023); 3× batting champion (2022–2024)
Medals
Men's baseball
Representing Venezuela
World Baseball Classic
Gold medal – first place	2026 Miami	Team
15U Baseball World Championship
Gold medal – first place	2012 Chihuahua	Team

Luis Sangel Arráez (born April 9, 1997) is a Venezuelan professional baseball infielder who is a free agent. He has played in Major League Baseball (MLB) for the Minnesota Twins, Miami Marlins, San Diego Padres, San Francisco Giants, and Philadelphia Phillies. Arráez represents the Venezuelan national team in international competitions. He is nicknamed "La Regadera" (Spanish for "The Sprinkler").

Arráez signed with the Twins as an international free agent in 2013 and made his MLB debut with them in 2019. He is a four-time All-Star and a two-time Silver Slugger Award winner. He became the first Marlins player to hit for the cycle in 2023.

Known for his ability to put the ball in play and not striking out, Arráez is considered one of the best contact hitters of his generation. From 2022 to 2024, Arráez became the first player in MLB history to win three consecutive batting titles with three different teams. In doing so, he spoiled two Triple Crown pursuits (Aaron Judge in 2022 and Shohei Ohtani in 2024). He was also the second player in the modern era to win a batting title in each league and the first to do so in consecutive years.

== Professional career ==
=== Minnesota Twins (2014–2022) ===
==== Minor leagues ====
Arráez signed with the Minnesota Twins as an international free agent on November 21, 2013. He made his professional debut in 2014 with the Dominican Summer League Twins, hitting .348/.433/.400 with 15 RBI. Arráez played for the Gulf Coast League Twins in 2015, hitting .306/.377/.388 with 19 RBI, and was an FCL post-season All-Star, and an MiLB.com organization All-Star. In 2016, he played for the Cedar Rapids Kernels, hitting .347 (second in the Midwest League)/.386/.444 with 67 runs (8th), 31 doubles (9th), three home runs and 66 RBI, and was a Midwest League mid-season and post-season All Star, and an MiLB.com organization All-Star.

Arráez played in only three games for the Fort Myers Miracle in 2017 due to a torn anterior cruciate ligament. He returned from the injury in 2018, playing for Fort Myers and the Chattanooga Lookouts, hitting a combined .310/.361/.397 with three home runs and 36 RBI. The Twins added him to their 40-man roster after the 2018 season.

Arráez opened the 2019 season with the Pensacola Blue Wahoos, hitting .342/.415/.397 with 14 RBI in 38 games. He was promoted to the Rochester Red Wings on May 14.

==== Major leagues ====
On May 17, 2019, the Twins called Arráez up to the major leagues for the first time. He made his major league debut on May 18 against the Seattle Mariners and got a double, his first career hit, off pitcher Cory Gearrin. Arráez hit his first major league home run on May 21 against the Los Angeles Angels. He finished the 2019 season hitting .334 in 326 at bats over 92 games with 36 walks and 29 strikeouts, and placed sixth in American League (AL) Rookie of the Year voting. He led the AL in percentage of balls hit to the opposite field, at 36.7%.

In 2020, Arráez hit .321/.364/.402 with 13 RBIs in 112 at bats over 32 games. In 2021, he batted .294/.357/.376 in 428 at bats, with 6 triples (fourth in the AL).

Arráez reached base five times on June 5, 2022, including four hits and one walk, in an 8–6 win over the Toronto Blue Jays. On June 9, the trio of Arráez, Byron Buxton, and Carlos Correa each hit consecutive home runs off Gerrit Cole to open the bottom of the first inning against the New York Yankees. On June 11, Arráez connected for his first major league grand slam, off Shane Baz of the Tampa Bay Rays. Arráez was chosen for his first career MLB All Star Game as a reserve for the AL.

In 2022, Arráez slashed .316/.375/.420 with 50 walks and 43 strikeouts in 547 at bats, leading the AL in at bats per strikeout (12.7). He struck out in 7.1% of his plate appearances, the lowest percentage of all major league batters. He had the highest contact percentage on all pitches thrown to him at 94.1%. When swinging at pitches outside the strike zone, he made contact a major-league best 91.1% of the time, and with pitches in the strike zone he made contact with 96.0% of all pitches he swung at, again tops in the majors. He played 65 games at first base, 41 at second base, 38 at DH, and 7 at third base. Arráez was named winner of the Luis Aparicio Award for the first time in his career, along with Jose Altuve of the Houston Astros, as the year's best Venezuelan players in MLB. His .316 batting average earned him the AL batting title. Aaron Judge of the New York Yankees, who led the AL in home runs and RBI, finished second to Arráez with a .311 average, denied of the Triple Crown.

=== Miami Marlins (2023–2024) ===
On January 20, 2023, the Twins traded Arráez to the Miami Marlins for Pablo López, José Salas, and Byron Chourio. Arráez's $6.1 million salary for the 2023 season was set by the arbitration process.

On April 11, Arráez became the first player in Marlins history to hit for the cycle in an 8–4 win over the Philadelphia Phillies (at the time, the Marlins were the only MLB team to have never had a player hit for the cycle). Later that season, on June 6, Arráez went 2-for-4 with two runs and an RBI, becoming the first player since Chipper Jones of the Atlanta Braves to bat over .400 at least 62 team games into the season. However, that run only lasted four days, when on June 11, he went 1-for-5, bringing his average down to .397. He then went 0-for-4 and 0-for-5 in the next two games. After going 5-for-5 on June 19, he raised his average over .400 once again. Arráez's three 5-hit games in June, a Marlins record over a single season, tied a mark set by Ty Cobb, George Sisler, and Dave Winfield for the most five-hit games in one month. At the midseason, Arráez was voted as the starting second baseman for the National League (NL) in the All-Star Game.

Arráez ended the season with an MLB-leading .354 average. He won the NL batting title, becoming the second player in the modern era to win a batting title in both leagues, following DJ LeMahieu. Arráez was the first to do so in consecutive seasons.

=== San Diego Padres (2024–2025) ===
On May 4, 2024, the Marlins traded Arráez and cash considerations to the San Diego Padres in exchange for Dillon Head, Jakob Marsee, Nathan Martorella, and Woo-suk Go. On September 29, Arráez recorded his 200th hit of the season. He became the first player in league history to win three consecutive batting titles with three different teams, finishing with a .314 batting average. Arráez struck out 4.3% of the time, the lowest percentage of all MLB batters, and led MLB with a 26.5% line drive percentage. Arráez only struck out once every 22 at bats, leading the league in that metric with a significant lead over second place Steven Kwan, who struck out once every 9.4 at bats. Arráez's strikeout rate was the lowest since Tony Gwynn's 1998 season, during which Gwynn struck out once every 25.6 at bats, and the fifth lowest strikeout rate of the preceding 35 years. On October 16, Arráez underwent surgery to repair a torn ligament in his thumb.

On September 1, 2025, Arraez recorded his 1,000th career hit via a bloop single off of Dietrich Enns of the Baltimore Orioles. He slashed .292/.327/.392 with eight home runs, 61 RBI, and 11 stolen bases in 154 games for San Diego, with his batting average ranking fourth best in the NL.

=== San Francisco Giants (2026) ===
On February 10, 2026, Arráez signed a one-year, $12 million contract with the San Francisco Giants to be their second baseman. Arráez made 105 appearances for San Francisco, posting a .324/.360/.440 batting line with four home runs, 43 RBI, and 10 stolen bases.

=== Philadelphia Phillies (2026–present) ===
On August 3, 2026, the Giants traded Arráez and Caleb Kilian to the Philadelphia Phillies in exchange for Ramon Marquez and Marty Gair.

== International career ==
Arráez was selected to the Venezuela national baseball team for the 2012 15U Baseball World Championship in Chihuahua, Mexico, where the team won gold.

Arráez also represented Venezuela in the 2023 World Baseball Classic (WBC). He slashed .235/.314/.647, with four hits and two walks over 19 plate appearances. Arráez homered twice in the tournament (tied with Anthony Santander for the team lead in home runs), both in the quarterfinal game against the United States. The first was off Lance Lynn in the first inning, and the second, a game-tying home run off David Bednar in the seventh inning. However, Venezuela would ultimately lose the game in the ninth inning and be eliminated from the tournament.

Arráez rejoined Venezuela for the 2026 WBC. He had another two-home run game in the tournament in a win over Israel in pool play. Later in 2026, he became an inductee into the Venezuelan Baseball Hall of Fame as a member of the WBC championship team.

== See also ==
- List of Major League Baseball batting champions
- List of Major League Baseball players from Venezuela
- List of Major League Baseball players to hit for the cycle
- List of Minnesota Twins team records
- Miami Marlins award winners and league leaders
- Minnesota Twins award winners and league leaders
- San Diego Padres award winners and league leaders

Awards and achievements
Preceded by Nolan Arenado	Hitting for the cycle April 11, 2023	Succeeded by Cedric Mullins
