= Francisco Liriano =

Dominican baseball player (born 1983)

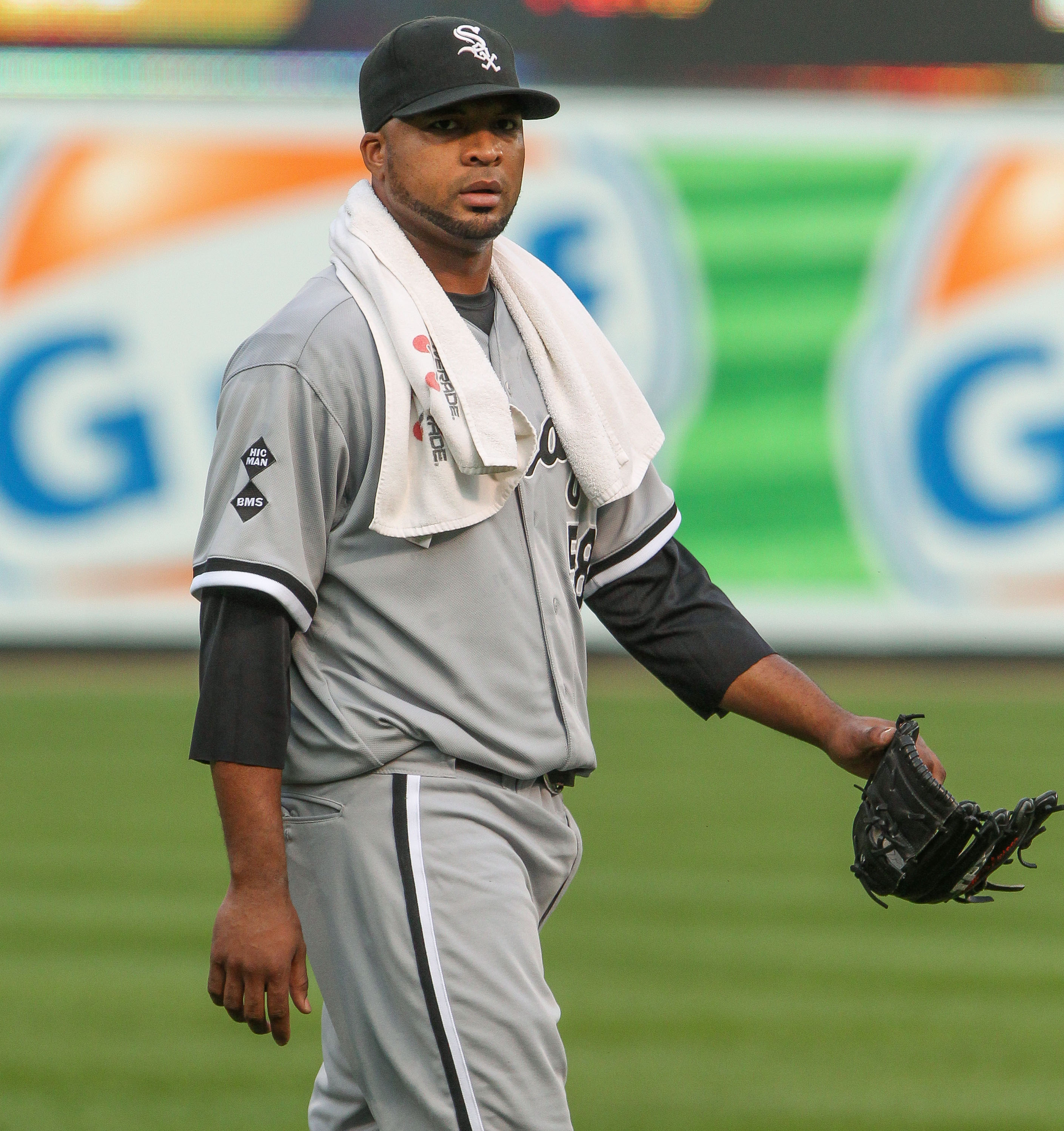
- Liriano with the Chicago White Sox
- Pitcher
- Born: October 26, 1983 (age 43); San Cristóbal, Dominican Republic
- Batted: Left Threw: Left

MLB debut
- September 5, 2005, for the Minnesota Twins

Last MLB appearance
- September 27, 2019, for the Pittsburgh Pirates

MLB statistics
- Win–loss record: 112–114
- Earned run average: 4.15
- Strikeouts: 1,815
- Stats at Baseball Reference

Teams
- Minnesota Twins (2005–2006, 2008–2012); Chicago White Sox (2012); Pittsburgh Pirates (2013–2016); Toronto Blue Jays (2016–2017); Houston Astros (2017); Detroit Tigers (2018); Pittsburgh Pirates (2019)

Career highlights and awards
- All-Star (2006); World Series champion (2017); 2× Comeback Player of the Year (2010, 2013); Pitched a no-hitter on May 3, 2011

Francisco Liriano Casillas (born October 26, 1983) is a Dominican former professional baseball pitcher. He played in Major League Baseball (MLB) for the Minnesota Twins, Chicago White Sox, Pittsburgh Pirates, Toronto Blue Jays, Houston Astros, and Detroit Tigers. Liriano was an MLB All-Star in 2006, and is a two-time winner of the MLB Comeback Player of the Year Award; he is the only player to win the award in both leagues.

== Professional career ==
=== San Francisco Giants ===
Liriano signed with the San Francisco Giants as an international free agent in 2000. After the 2003 season, the Giants traded him to the Minnesota Twins, along with pitchers Joe Nathan and Boof Bonser, in exchange for catcher A. J. Pierzynski.

=== Minnesota Twins ===
==== 2005 ====
Often compared to former teammate Johan Santana, another hard-throwing lefty, Liriano was touted as one of the "super-prospects" within the Twins organization. As a member of the Rochester Red Wings, Minnesota's Triple-A farm club, Liriano was awarded the 2005 International League Rookie of the Year. He led all minor league pitchers in strikeouts that year, with 204. He made his major league debut in relief on September 5, 2005, against the Texas Rangers, allowing a home run to his first batter, Gary Matthews Jr., before retiring his next three batters. He later joined the Twins' starting rotation and won his first game on September 30, 2005, against the Detroit Tigers.

==== 2006 ====
Liriano began the 2006 season in Minnesota's bullpen, but was promoted to the starting rotation in May, exchanging positions with struggling starter Carlos Silva. He started the season 12–3 and won the American League Rookie of the Month awards for June and July. He was named by American League manager Ozzie Guillén as one of five candidates for the 2006 All-Star Final Vote and finished second to the player he was traded for, A. J. Pierzynski. Guillén selected Liriano for his first All-Star game to replace fatigued starting pitcher José Contreras.

Liriano led the Major Leagues with a 2.19 ERA, statistics putting him in discussion for both the American League Cy Young and Rookie of the Year awards, but a trip to the disabled list on August 11 left him with too few innings to qualify as the league's official ERA leader and jeopardized his chances at any such awards in 2006. On August 1, 2006, Liriano was scratched from his scheduled August 2 start because of forearm inflammation after a bullpen session. He missed one start before resuming bullpen work without pain, but was placed on the disabled list after continued arm pain during his last start on August 7, 2006. Liriano began a rehabilitation program on August 22, and threw off a mound for the first time on August 30, throwing only his fastball and changeup, and said that he would like to pitch his breaking ball later that week. He made a rehab start for Triple-A Rochester on September 9, throwing 40 pitches for four strikeouts and one walk in three hitless innings. After the game, he reported feeling no pain in his elbow and was activated by the Twins. In his first start back on September 13, Liriano left the game in the third inning with left elbow pain. He was shut down for the season after the game.

On November 6, 2006, Liriano underwent Tommy John surgery to curtail the pain in his left elbow. He missed the entire 2007 season.

==== 2008 ====
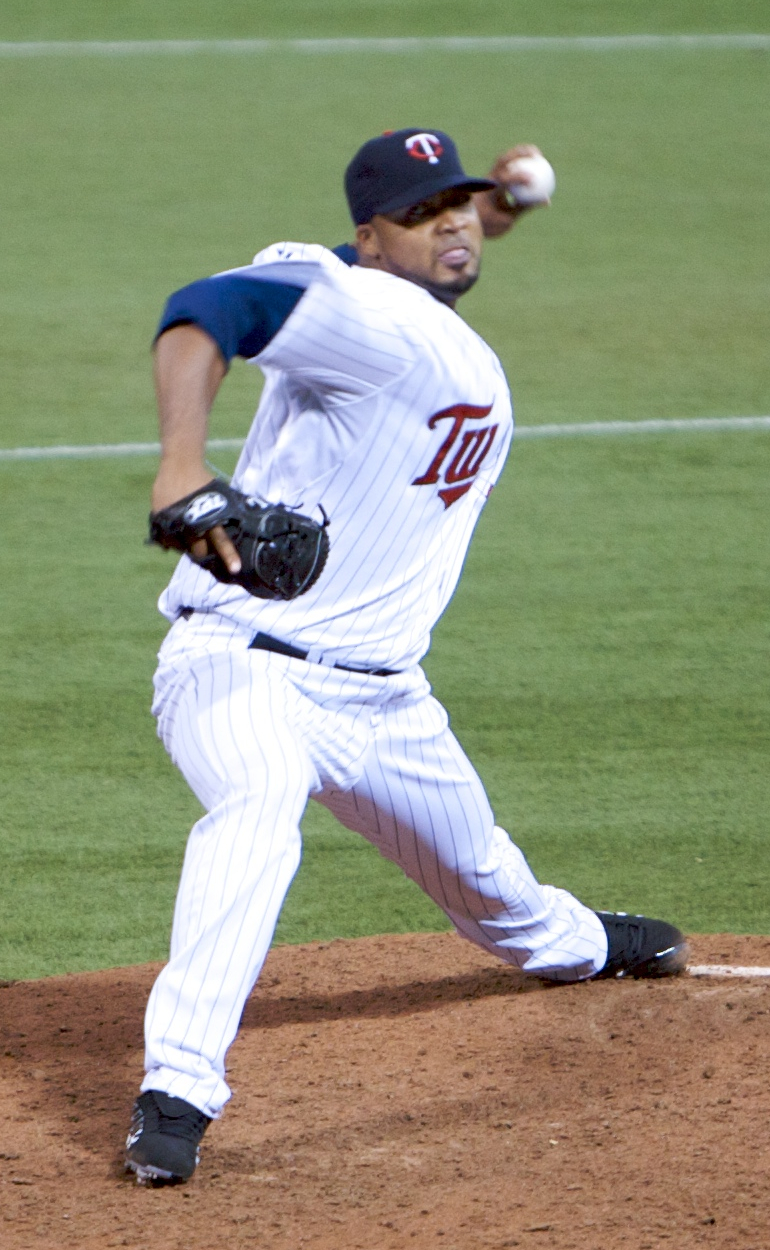
Liriano pitching for the Twins in 2008.

On April 11, 2008, Liriano was recalled from Triple-A Rochester in the place of injured pitcher Kevin Slowey. Liriano made his season debut and his first game since Tommy John surgery on April 13, against the Royals. He pitched 4 2/3 innings, giving up six hits, four earned runs and walking five while picking up a loss.

On April 25, Liriano was sent back to the minors after a rough start to the season coming off Tommy John surgery. In three starts, he compiled an 0–3 record with an 11.32 ERA.

After recording an ERA of 2.67 and going 10–0 in his 11 most recent minor league starts, the Twins recalled Liriano on August 1, from Triple-A Rochester Red Wings, replacing Liván Hernández in the rotation. Hernandez was designated for assignment. In his first start after being recalled, Liriano pitched six scoreless innings and struck out five, recording the win. In 13 total starts in 2008, he went 6–4 with a 3.91 ERA.

==== 2009 ====
Liriano struggled in 2009, posting a 5–13 record with a 5.80 ERA in 29 games (24 starts). However, this was his first year since his Tommy John surgery that he had spent that entire year on the Twins major league roster. On June 28 against the St. Louis Cardinals, he threw seven strong innings, only surrendering two runs. On August 12 against Kansas City, Liriano went another seven innings, only allowing one run in yet another strong outing. Between those strong flashes of brilliance though, he logged several sub-par showings, frequently giving up several runs during short times on the mound.

==== 2010 ====
During the 2009 offseason, Liriano returned to his native Dominican Republic to play winter baseball, playing for Leones del Escogido. He helped his club earn a postseason berth and then went 3–1 with a 0.49 ERA in seven playoff starts, while recording 47 strikeouts and five walks in 37 innings, as Leones del Escogido won the league championship.

Liriano reported to spring training lighter than usual, and Twins coaches expressed guarded optimism that he had regained some of his 2006 form. The Twins considered using him as a closer to replace the injured Joe Nathan, but instead he was named to the starting rotation.

Liriano got off to a fast start in 2010. In his first four starts for the Twins, he posted a 3–0 record with an 0.93 ERA and 27 strikeouts. On May 3, he was named the American League Pitcher of the Month for April. Through May 18, he had posted a 4–2 record and a 2.63 ERA in seven starts, striking out 46 in 48 innings and not giving up a single home run.

Liriano struggled from mid-May until the All-Star break, losing five of seven decisions. But after the break, he returned to his early season form. Over an eleven start stretch from July 16 (his first game after the All-Star break) to September 14, Liriano posted an 8–0 record to go along with a 2.41 ERA. Across this span, he limited hitters to a .227 batting average, struck out 72 in 71 innings against 25 walks, and gave up only two home runs. Liriano struggled in his final three starts of the season, however, losing all three outings and posting an ERA of 8.10.

Liriano finished 2010 fifth in the AL in strikeouts with 201, while walking 58. He posted a 14–10 record for the year with a 3.62 ERA and a career-high 191 2/3 innings pitched across 31 starts, 20 of which were quality. He was considered a Cy Young candidate by some writers, as his 2.66 FIP (a defense independent pitching statistic) was second only to Cliff Lee in the American League, and his 2.95 xFIP was first in the American League. Despite his ERA only ranking 14th in the league, Liriano posted an extremely low FIP primarily due to his ability to limit home runs. Liriano only allowed nine across the entire regular season (three of which came in his final start) and his HR/9 rate of 0.42 led the American League (which was also the lowest rate posted by a Twins starter in over 20 years). He was further benefited by his high strikeout totals, as his K/9 ratio of 9.44 ranked second in the AL behind Jon Lester and he was one of only five AL pitchers that year with at least 200 strikeouts.

Liriano started Game 1 of the 2010 American League Division Series for the Twins. He received a no-decision after pitching 5 2/3 innings, allowing four earned runs on six hits while walking three and striking out seven. The Twins lost Game 1 to the New York Yankees, 6–4, and were swept in three games, marking the end of Liriano's season. Liriano finished tied for eleventh in the voting for the American League Cy Young Award alongside Justin Verlander, receiving one fifth-place vote.

==== 2011 ====
On February 5, 2011, Liriano signed a one-year, $4.3 million contract with the Twins, avoiding arbitration. Liriano struggled through his first five starts of 2011, giving up 24 earned runs in 23 2/3 innings through the month of April. During this period of five starts, he only entered the seventh inning once. He met with his pitching coach and manager after these starts and was in danger of losing his spot in the starting rotation. His fortunes changed significantly in his next start. On May 3, Liriano pitched his first career complete game, a 1–0 no-hitter against the Chicago White Sox at U.S. Cellular Field. The no-hitter featured six walks, a high (although not record-high) number for a no-hit game. He struck out two of the 30 batters he faced and threw 123 pitches, 66 of which were strikes. It was the first no-hitter for the Twins organization since Eric Milton accomplished the feat on September 11, 1999, against the Anaheim Angels, and the seventh official no-hitter for the franchise.

After the no-hitter, Liriano made several strong appearances, including an exceptional start on June 12 against the Texas Rangers. He retired the first 19 batters in order and didn't give up a hit until the eighth inning. Liriano's performance faded later in 2011. After an exceptional outing against the New York Yankees, he left his next start on August 25 after just two innings. He was placed on the disabled list later that day with a left shoulder strain. On September 16, Liriano was activated from the disabled list, and was moved to the bullpen for the rest of the year. Liriano finished the season with a record of 9–10 and an ERA of 5.09 in 26 games (24 starts).

==== 2012 ====
Liriano pitched a four-strikeout inning in the fourth inning of the Twins' game against the Kansas City Royals on June 5, 2012. On July 13, he struck out 15 batters in a loss to the Oakland Athletics, topping his career high of 12 strikeouts. He caused 27 swing and misses, the highest number since 2007. In 22 games (17 starts) with the Twins in 2012 before he was traded, Liriano went 3–10 with a 5.31 ERA and 109 strikeouts.

=== Chicago White Sox ===
On July 28, 2012, Liriano was traded to the Chicago White Sox in exchange for Eduardo Escobar and Pedro Hernández. As Liriano struggled with the command of his pitches, the White Sox removed him from the rotation in September. In 12 games (11 starts) with the White Sox, he went 3–2 with a 5.40 ERA. He became a free agent following the season.

=== Pittsburgh Pirates ===
==== 2013 ====
Liriano agreed to a two-year contract with the Pittsburgh Pirates on December 21, 2012. The contract was voided shortly after as he suffered an injury to his non-throwing arm and failed his physical, having broken his non-throwing arm while he tried to scare his kids at Christmas. A new two-year deal was reached between the Pirates and Liriano and became official on February 8, 2013. He started the 2013 season on the Pirates's 15-day disabled list. He made his debut on May 11 against the New York Mets, allowing one earned run in 5 1/3 innings while striking out nine to earn the win. Liriano's improved command by changing his pitching mechanics led to a career rebirth with Pittsburgh. He finished his 2013 campaign with a record of 16–8, an ERA of 3.02, and 163 strikeouts in 26 starts.

In the Pirates' first playoff game in 21 years, Liriano gave up one run and four hits in seven innings while earning the win as the Pirates defeated the Reds 6–2 in the NL Wild Card game. He thus became the first Pirates pitcher to win a postseason game since Tim Wakefield in 1992, as well as the first pitcher to win a postseason game at PNC Park. Liriano was named the 2013 NL Comeback Player of the Year for his bounce back year.

==== 2014 ====
Liriano struggled greatly in the first half of the season, going 1–7 with a 4.72 ERA in 15 starts at the All Star break. However, he reclaimed his dominance of 2013 in the second half of the season, going 6–3 with a 2.20 ERA in 14 starts to end the season. Overall, Liriano posted another strong season in 2014, going 7–10 with a 3.38 ERA and 175 strikeouts in 29 starts. On December 9, 2014, he re-signed with the Pirates on a three-year, $39 million contract.

==== 2015 ====
Liriano continued his success from his previous seasons, striking out a career-high 205 and going 12–7 with a 3.38 ERA in 31 starts for the Pirates. He led major league pitchers in lowest contact percentage (67.5%). He also had the lowest zone percentage of all major league pitchers, with only 35.8% of his pitches being in the strike zone.

==== 2016 ====
Liriano was named Opening Day starter for the Pirates for the third successive year. However, he struggled throughout the season with bouts of wildness. In 21 starts with the Pirates, he pitched to a 6–11 record, 5.46 ERA, 116 strikeouts and 69 walks through 113 2/3 innings.

=== Toronto Blue Jays ===
On August 1, 2016, the Pirates traded Liriano along with Reese McGuire and Harold Ramírez to the Toronto Blue Jays for Drew Hutchison. While it was initially believed that Liriano would replace Aaron Sanchez in the rotation due to the organization's desire to limit Sanchez's workload, general manager Ross Atkins announced on August 4 that the Blue Jays would use a six-man rotation going forward. Liriano made his debut with the Blue Jays on August 5, pitching six innings against the Kansas City Royals and yielding two earned runs in a 4–3 win. He appeared in 10 games (eight starts) with the Blue Jays to close out the season, and posted a 2–2 record, 2.92 ERA, and 52 strikeouts in 49 1/3 innings. Between the Pirates and Blue Jays, he had the highest rate of bases on balls per 9 innings pitched in the majors (4.69).

In the Wild Card game, Liriano entered in relief in the 10th inning and retired all five of the batters he faced. He took the win after Edwin Encarnación's walk-off home run in the eleventh inning. During the eighth inning in the second game of the ALDS, Rangers outfielder Carlos Gómez hit a 102-mph line drive single that struck Liriano near the back of the head. He was taken to a local hospital for examination, and cleared to return to Toronto with his teammates.

On June 25, 2017, Liriano earned the 100th win of his career in an 8–2 victory over the Kansas City Royals.

=== Houston Astros ===
On July 31, 2017, the Blue Jays traded Liriano to the Houston Astros for Nori Aoki and Teoscar Hernández. Liriano was moved from the rotation to the bullpen following his acquisition. He made 20 appearances out of the bullpen and finished with an 0–2 record with a 4.40 ERA. Overall in 2017, Liriano made 38 appearances (18 starts), posting a 6–7 record and a 5.66 ERA. The Astros finished the year with a 101–61 record (first in AL West), and eventually won the 2017 World Series. He became a free agent following the season.

=== Detroit Tigers ===
On February 23, 2018, Liriano signed a one-year contract with the Detroit Tigers. He earned a spot in the Tigers starting rotation, and won his Tiger debut in a 6–1 decision over the Kansas City Royals on April 2. Liriano was placed on the 10-day disabled list with a hamstring strain following a May 26 start against the Chicago White Sox. He was recalled on June 23 and made a start against the Cleveland Indians. On August 30, 2018, Liriano gave up Giancarlo Stanton's 300th home run. Liriano made 26 starts for the Tigers, compiling a 5–12 record with a 4.58 ERA and 110 strikeouts in 133 2/3 innings. He became a free agent following the season.

=== Pittsburgh Pirates (second sint) ===
On February 4, 2019, Liriano agreed to a one-year minor league deal with the Pittsburgh Pirates. On March 23, 2019, the Pirates announced that Liriano had made the opening day roster. He was used exclusively as a relief pitcher during the season, posting a 5–3 record with a 3.47 ERA in 69 relief appearances, and he recorded 63 strikeouts in 70 innings. He became a free agent following the season.

=== Later career ===
On January 22, 2020, Liriano signed a minor league deal with the Philadelphia Phillies. He was released on July 18, and on August 2, Liriano opted out of the 2020 season due to the COVID-19 pandemic, although he had "multiple guaranteed offers" on the table.

On February 2, 2021, Liriano signed a minor league contract with the Toronto Blue Jays, and was invited to spring training. On March 29, 2021, Liriano was released by the Blue Jays after triggering his opt-out clause.

On January 17, 2022, Liriano announced his retirement.

== Pitching style ==
As of 2012, Liriano is a four-pitch pitcher. To left-handed hitters he throws a four-seam fastball, a two-seam fastball (both averaging about 93 mph), and a slider (mid 80s). Against right-handers, he adds a mid-80s changeup. More than half of his pitches with two strikes are sliders, perhaps due to the relatively high whiff rate – 43% over his career. He has one of the league's highest whiff rates on a slider with two strikes.

Liriano has been a strikeout pitcher throughout his career, averaging better than one strikeout per inning through the end of the 2019 season.

== Personal life ==
Liriano's arrival in the United States for 2008 spring training was delayed due to visa problems caused by a prior drunk driving arrest in 2006. Francisco and Johanna Liriano became parents to Kevin Liriano on April 4, 2008. Liriano is the first cousin of pitcher Santiago Casilla.

== See also ==
- List of Major League Baseball no-hitters
- List of Major League Baseball players from the Dominican Republic
- List of Major League Baseball single-inning strikeout leaders
- List of Minnesota Twins no-hitters
- List of Pittsburgh Pirates award winners and league leaders
- Minnesota Twins award winners and league leaders

Awards and achievements
| Preceded by Roy Halladay | No-hitter pitcher May 3, 2011 | Succeeded by Justin Verlander |
| Preceded by Félix Hernández | American League Pitcher of the Month; April 2010 | Succeeded by Jon Lester |
