= Johan Santana =

Venezuelan baseball player (born 1979)

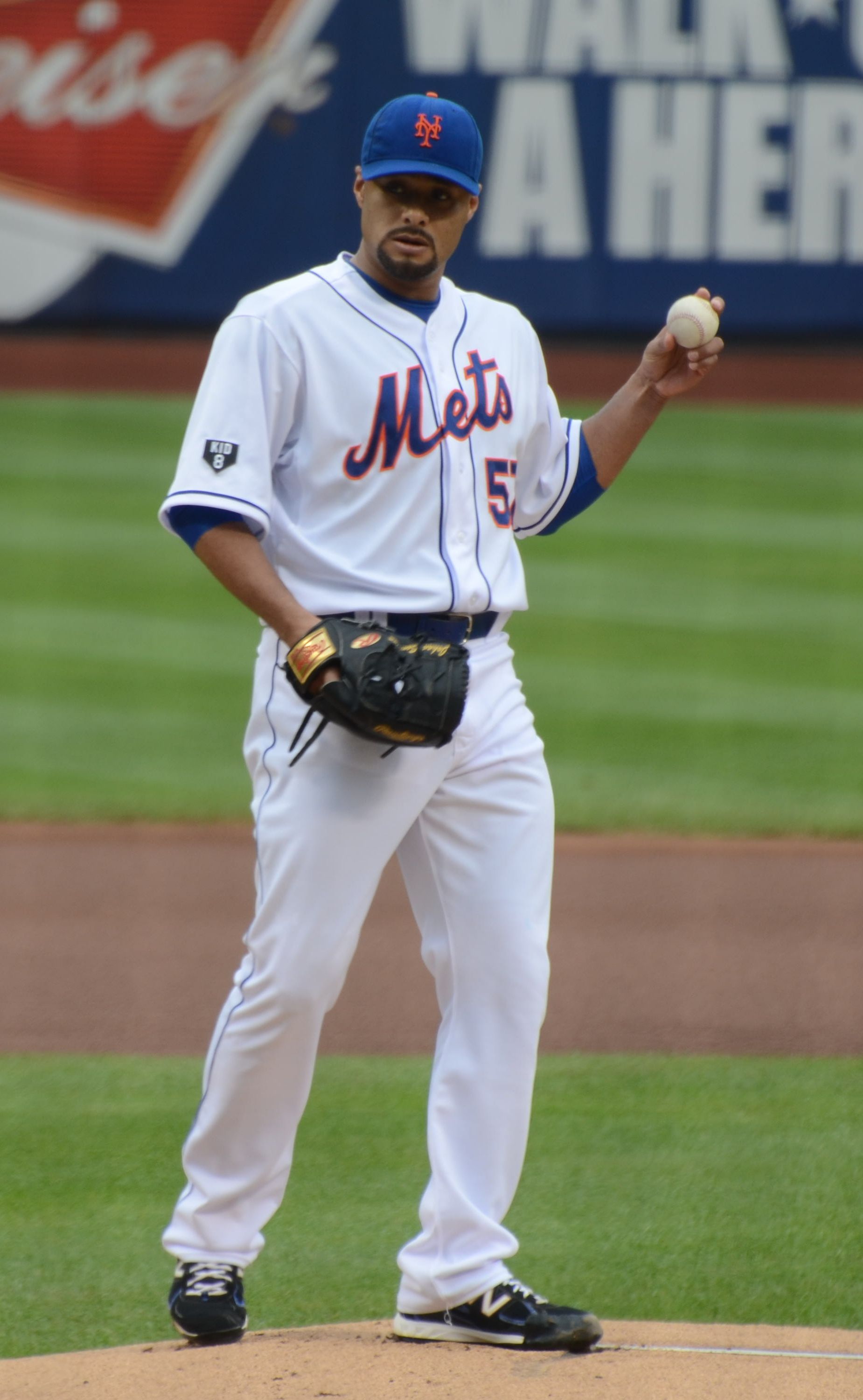
- Santana with the New York Mets in 2012
- Pitcher
- Born: March 13, 1979 (age 47); Tovar, Venezuela
- Batted: Left Threw: Left

MLB debut
- April 3, 2000, for the Minnesota Twins

Last MLB appearance
- August 17, 2012, for the New York Mets

MLB statistics
- Win–loss record: 139–78
- Earned run average: 3.20
- Strikeouts: 1,988
- Stats at Baseball Reference

Teams
- Minnesota Twins (2000–2007); New York Mets (2008–2010, 2012)

Career highlights and awards
- 4× All-Star (2005–2007, 2009); 2× AL Cy Young Award (2004, 2006); Triple Crown (2006); Gold Glove Award (2007); MLB wins leader (2006); 3× ERA leader (2004, 2006, 2008); 3× AL strikeout leader (2004–2006); Pitched a no-hitter on June 1, 2012; Minnesota Twins Hall of Fame

Johan Alexander Santana Araque (/ˈjoʊhɑːn/; born March 13, 1979) is a Venezuelan former professional baseball starting pitcher. Santana pitched in Major League Baseball (MLB) for the Minnesota Twins from 2000 to 2007 and for the New York Mets from 2008 to 2012. A two-time Cy Young Award winner with the Twins, Santana is a four-time All-Star and earned a pitching triple crown in 2006. On June 1, 2012, Santana pitched the first no-hitter in New York Mets history against the St. Louis Cardinals.

== Professional career ==
Santana was discovered in 1994 by Andres Reiner, who was a scout working for the Houston Astros at the time. Santana's parents agreed to let him attend Houston's academy in Valencia. When Astros scouting director Dan O'Brien called Reiner and asked if he had signed Santana to a contract, Reiner reported that he was still deciding if Santana was a better prospect as an outfielder or a pitcher. After six weeks of training, Santana was told he was going to pitch. Santana did not like it and almost left, but Reiner convinced him to stay. While originally a center fielder, Santana was converted to a pitcher at the academy due to his arm speed. In 1999 he was named the Tovar Mérida Athlete of the Year.

=== Minnesota Twins ===
After the 1999 major league season, Santana was left unprotected by the Houston Astros and eligible in the Rule 5 draft. The Minnesota Twins had the first pick that year, the Florida Marlins had the second. The Twins made a deal with the Marlins: the Twins would draft Jared Camp with their first pick and the Marlins would draft Santana. The teams would exchange the two players with the Twins receiving $50,000 to cover their pick.

Santana made his Major League debut with the Twins on April 3, 2000, coming from the bullpen vs. Tampa Bay. He made his first MLB start on April 7, 2000, at Kansas City and recorded his first Major League win in a relief appearance at Houston on June 6. He put up a 6.49 ERA in 86 innings pitched in 2000.

In 2002, the Twins sent Santana to the minors for 2 months to work almost exclusively on perfecting his changeup. He did this for 10 starts and came back up to the majors with a terrific changeup to complement his very good fastball. While in the minors, pitching coach Bobby Cuellar made Santana throw at least one changeup to every batter. According to Cuellar, Santana would sometimes throw 20 in a row during games.

Santana was used as a long reliever early in his career after finding little success as a starter. In 2002, he led the majors in wild pitches, with 15.

In 2003, Santana transitioned from relief to the Twins' starting rotation after spending the first four months of the season in the bullpen. He won his last eight decisions and pitched the ALDS opening game against the Yankees.

Due to Santana's early major-league success with the Twins, a young minor-league pitcher in the Anaheim Angels' farm system also named Johan Santana changed his name to Ervin Santana in 2003; he also achieved major league success. Santana underwent minor elbow surgery following the season.

==== 2004 season ====
In 2004, Santana had one of the great second half performances of the modern era. He became the first pitcher since 1961 to give up four or fewer hits in 10 straight starts, and his 13–0 record broke the old Major League second-half mark shared between Burt Hooton and Rick Sutcliffe.

Santana's other second-half numbers were equally impressive: 11.13 strikeouts per nine innings, 1.21 ERA, 4.74 hits per nine innings, and 6.73 baserunners per nine innings. In addition, Santana set a team season record with 265 strikeouts, surpassing the old 258 mark registered by Bert Blyleven in 1973.

Santana finished in good form with a 20–6 record and led the American League (AL) in strikeouts (265), ERA (2.61), strikeouts per nine innings pitched (10.46), WHIP (0.92), batting average allowed (.192), OBP (.249), SLG (.315), and OPS (.564) and walked only 54 batters in 228 innings. Opponents stole just six bases in seven attempts against him, and his 20 victories ranked him second behind only Curt Schilling's 21. He easily won the AL Cy Young Award with all 28 first-place votes.

==== 2005 season ====
Santana struggled in his first outing of 2005, giving up four runs in the first inning, but quickly regained his composure and returned to Cy Young-winning form in an 8–4 victory over the Seattle Mariners. In his second game, he recorded 11 strikeouts against the Chicago White Sox as the Twins won 5–2. Santana finished the season with an ERA of 2.87, second-lowest in the AL behind Indians pitcher Kevin Millwood (2.86). However, the weak Twins club of the 2005 season cost him several otherwise-winnable games, and his winning percentage fell considerably in his second full year as a starter. He threw 238 strikeouts during the season, leading the majors, and finished third in the Cy Young voting, finishing behind winner Bartolo Colón and closer Mariano Rivera.

==== 2006 season ====
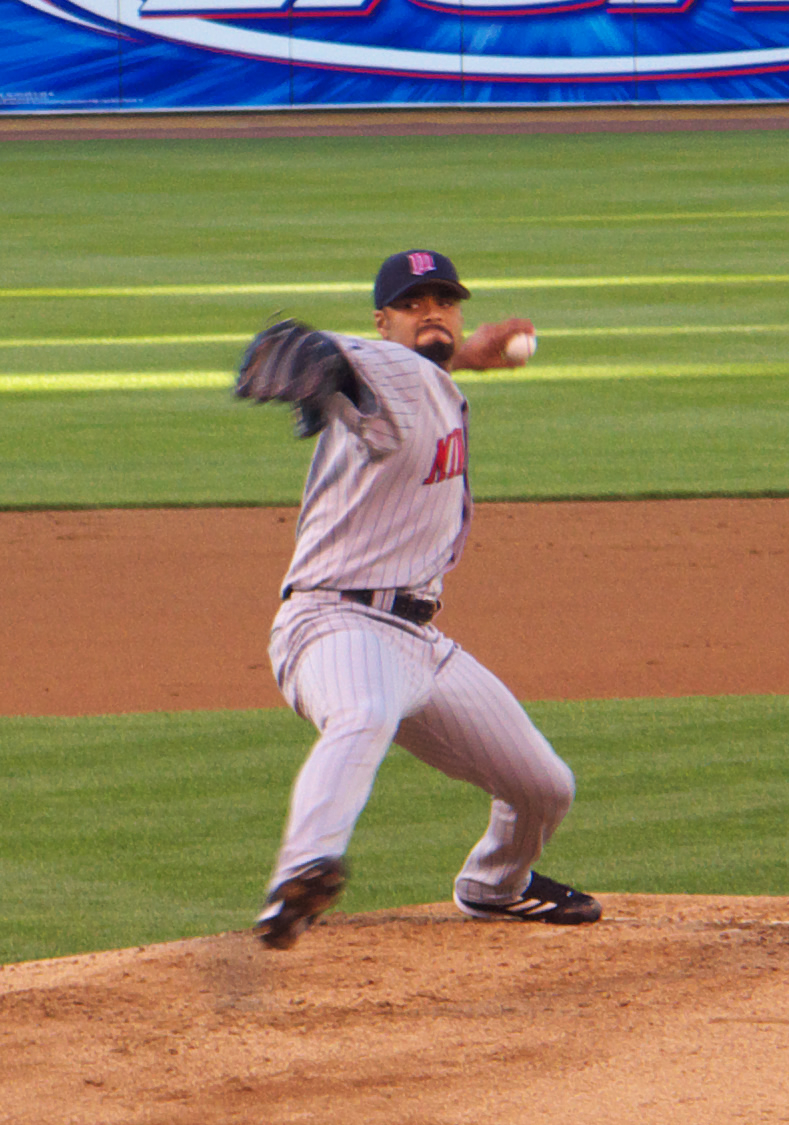
Santana pitching for the Twins on June 2, 2006

Santana won the pitching Major League Triple Crown, the first pitcher to do so since Dwight Gooden in 1985. He completed the season leading the majors in ERA (2.77) and strikeouts (245), and tied Chien-Ming Wang in wins (19). He became the first pitcher to win the triple crown with fewer than 20 wins, and the first to win it with an ERA above 2.60.

Santana also led the AL in WHIP (1.00), opposing batting average (.216), and innings pitched (233.2). He continued to add to his reputation as a great second-half pitcher, losing only one game after the All-Star break while winning 10 and posting a 2.54 ERA. A brief slump cost him the opportunity to make his 20th win of the season. No pitcher in Major League Baseball won 20 games in the 2006 season, the first time in modern major league history this occurred.

Santana won his second Cy Young Award in 2006, becoming the 14th player in MLB history to win the award multiple times. He became the fifth pitcher to win the award by a unanimous vote multiple times, joining Roger Clemens, Pedro Martínez, Greg Maddux and Sandy Koufax, who accomplished the feat three times.

From 2004 to 2006, Santana led the league in strikeouts all three years, in ERA twice, and also led in several other key statistical areas. In this three-year span, he compiled a 55–19 record with an ERA of 2.75 and WHIP of 0.96, while striking out 748 batters.

==== 2007 season ====
After a slow start, with his record falling to 6–6 at one point, Santana jump-started his season with a four-hit shutout, followed by two wins. On July 1, 2007, Santana was named as a member of the 2007 All-Star Game, his third straight appearance. On June 19, 2007, on the team bus to a game at Shea Stadium, Bert Blyleven said he would have his head shaved if that night's starting pitcher, Santana, threw a complete-game shutout. The Twins won, 9–0, and Santana went the distance on a four-hitter. Santana shaved Blyleven's head the following day. Santana had perhaps his best career game on August 19 against the Texas Rangers in which he struck out 17 batters over eight innings. He walked none and allowed only two hits, both to Sammy Sosa. His 17 strikeouts set a Twins club record for strikeouts in a game. Santana's game score of 95 is the highest by any pitcher in MLB history in a non-complete game.

He led the major leagues in home runs allowed (33) and had the most losses of his career (13). Santana finished the season with only 15 wins, his lowest total since 2003. However, Santana led the AL in WHIP, was second in strikeouts with 235, and seventh in ERA. In the last game of the season, a rain delay in a road game against the Detroit Tigers that lasted over an hour caused Santana to pitch only three innings. This ended a 123 consecutive start streak in which he pitched five innings or more. This is the third-longest consecutive-game streak for a pitcher in the past half-century. In November, it was announced Santana was awarded the AL Gold Glove Award for pitcher, his first selection. He was also honored with a Fielding Bible Award as the best fielding pitcher in MLB, and finished 5th in the AL Cy Young Award voting.

=== New York Mets ===
==== 2008 season ====
On February 2, 2008, Santana was traded from the Twins to the New York Mets for Carlos Gómez, Philip Humber, Deolis Guerra, and Kevin Mulvey. The Mets and Santana agreed to a six-year, $137.5 million contract. Santana was named the Opening Day starter, throwing 100 pitches in seven innings to earn the win against the Florida Marlins. On May 10, 2008, he earned his first win at Shea Stadium as a member of the New York Mets.

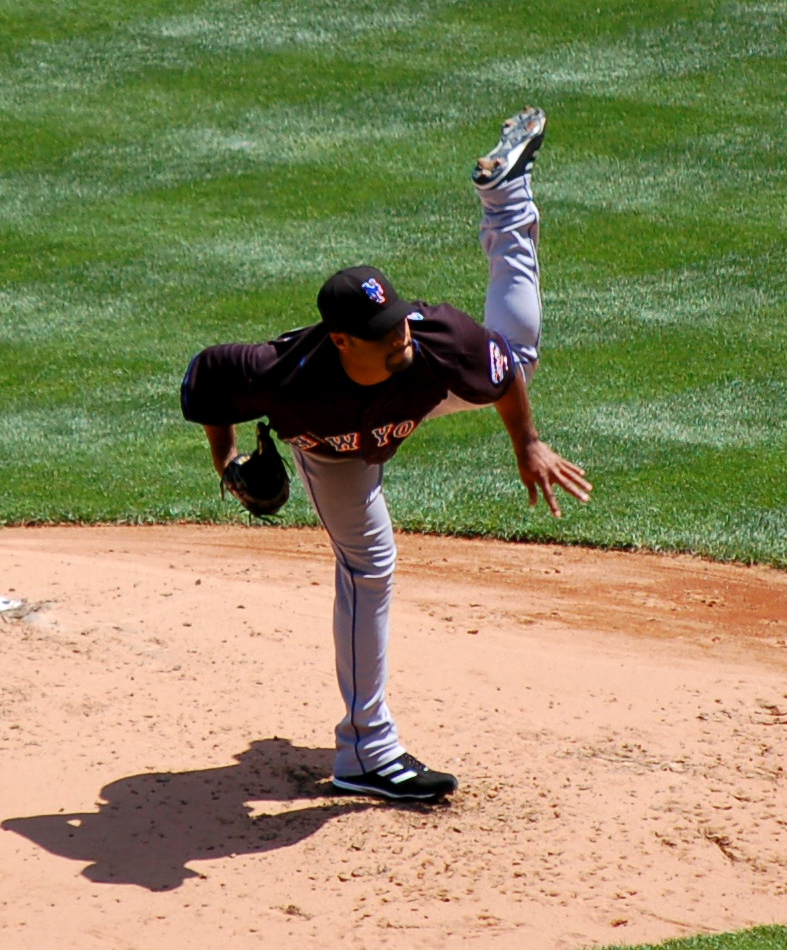
Santana releasing a pitch in May 2008

On June 1, 2008, Santana earned his 100th career victory, going 7.2 innings and allowing one run in a 6–1 win over the Los Angeles Dodgers.

On July 27, the day after the Mets played a 14-inning game where every pitcher in the bullpen was used, Johan pitched a complete game, striking out five and getting his first RBI as a Met against the St. Louis Cardinals, improving his record to 9–7. On August 17, 2008, Santana pitched his second complete game for his 11th win of the season, allowing only three hits while walking none and striking out 7 in a 3–0 Mets shutout over the Pittsburgh Pirates.

On September 23, Santana threw 125 pitches, a career-high to that point, in eight innings to beat the Chicago Cubs. On September 27, in the thick of a playoff race and on the final weekend of the season, Santana pitched a complete three-hit gem in a 2–0 win against the Florida Marlins on three days' rest. It was later revealed that Santana had pitched that day, and perhaps in many other starts, with a torn meniscus in his left knee, for which he underwent successful surgery on October 1, 2008.

Santana finished the 2008 regular season with a 16–7 record, posting a 2.53 ERA with 206 strikeouts, which set a Mets' single-season record for strikeouts by a left-handed pitcher, breaking Jon Matlack's 35-year record of 205 in 1973. His 2.53 ERA led the majors and was a career-best. He also set a career-high in innings pitched and was undefeated in the second half of the season. However, he was also the victim of seven blown saves, tying for first in the majors.

Santana finished in third place in the NL Cy Young Award race behind Brandon Webb and winner Tim Lincecum.

==== 2009 season ====
On April 7, 2009, Johan Santana started the first game for the New York Mets in the 2009 season against the Cincinnati Reds. He went 5.2 innings allowing only one earned run, going on to win. In his second start on April 12, Santana struck out 13 batters and surrendered two unearned runs over seven innings against the Florida Marlins only to lose for the first time since June 28, 2008, against the New York Yankees. On August 25 Santana was placed on the 15-day disabled list and missed the remainder of the season after having to undergo season-ending arthroscopic surgery to remove bone chips in his left elbow. Santana finished the season at a record of 13–9 with a 3.13 ERA.

In 2009, he was ranked number 3 on the Sporting News' list of the 50 greatest current players in baseball, behind Albert Pujols and Alex Rodriguez. A panel of 100 baseball people, many of them members of the Baseball Hall of Fame and winners of major baseball awards, was polled to arrive at the list.

==== 2010 season ====
In a start on May 2, 2010, against Philadelphia, Santana gave up 10 runs in 3 2/3 innings, the worst start in his MLB career, surpassing his previous worst start on June 14, 2009, versus the Yankees, where he allowed nine runs and nine hits in just three innings. However, in the next five starts after that, Santana gave up only seven earned runs, striking out 21 and improving his record to 4–2 with a 3.03 ERA. On July 6, Santana hit his first major league home run off of Matt Maloney of the Cincinnati Reds, which provided the Mets with their first run, and pitched a complete-game shutout to earn the win. From July 1 – 23, Santana was 3–0 with a 0.71 ERA in five starts. Santana, who was struggling to keep his 10–9 record through September 2, strained his pectoral muscle in a 65 pitch start versus Atlanta, for the second time in his career. His last game of the season was a win against the Atlanta Braves on September 2. On September 14, he underwent surgery to repair a torn anterior capsule in his left shoulder. Santana ended his season with a record of 11–9 and an ERA of 2.98. This was the third consecutive year that Johan had gotten injured.

==== 2011 season ====
Johan Santana missed the entire 2011 major league season while he recovered from anterior capsule surgery to his left shoulder (dominant), pitching only in the minors.

==== 2012 season ====
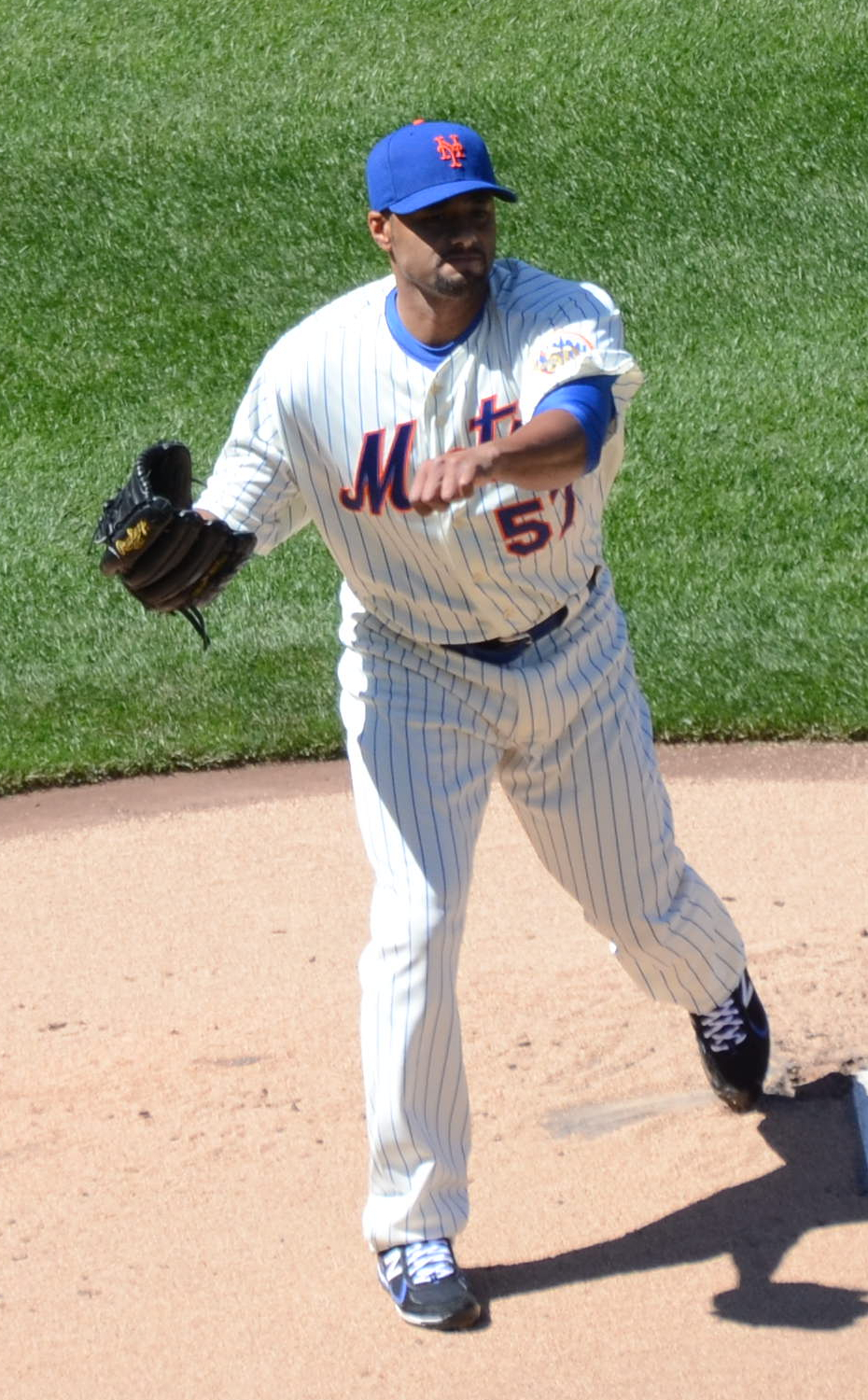
Santana in his return to the Mets

On April 5, 2012, Santana was tabbed as the Mets Opening Day starter. This marked the first time Santana pitched in the majors since September 2, 2010, when he tore the anterior capsule in his left shoulder. He went five scoreless innings against the Atlanta Braves, striking out five batters. On May 26, Santana pitched a complete game shut-out against the San Diego Padres, the ninth of his career. He struck out seven over nine innings and improved to 2–2 with a 2.75 ERA over his first 10 starts. On June 30, in Dodger Stadium, he scattered three hits over eight shutout innings. After three more starts, on July 21, Santana was placed on the 15-day disabled list by the Mets after spraining his right ankle. Santana was again put on the 15-day disabled list with inflammation in his lower back on August 22. He did not pitch for the remainder of the 2012 season. Santana finished the season 6–9 with a 4.85 ERA and 111 strikeouts in 21 starts and 117 innings pitched.

===== No-hitter =====
On June 1, in only the 11th start since returning from shoulder surgery, Santana threw a no-hitter against the St. Louis Cardinals, the defending World Series champions. This was the first no-hitter in Mets franchise history, coming in their 51st season and 8,020th regular-season game. It marked only the eighth no-hitter in MLB history against a defending World Series champion team, the first since Nolan Ryan blanked the Oakland Athletics in 1990. Santana walked five batters, recorded eight strikeouts, and lowered his season ERA to 2.38. He also threw a career-high 134 pitches. Notable moments in the game included a liner in the sixth inning by former Met Carlos Beltrán, which hit the foul line behind third base but was ruled foul. In the seventh inning, Mike Baxter made a difficult catch in left field, preserving the no-hitter, and then violently crashed into the wall. He left the game with a bruised left shoulder and was subsequently placed on the disabled list.

For throwing the no-hitter, Santana was named National League Player of the Week for the week ending June 3, 2012. It was his fifth such award and followed his teammate R. A. Dickey who won it the prior week. His pitching feat earned him the Key to the City, which was bestowed by Mayor Michael Bloomberg.

As of 2025, Santana's no-hitter is the only solo no-hitter by a Mets pitcher, although five Mets pitchers combined to no-hit the Philadelphia Phillies 3-0 on April 29, 2022.

==== 2013 season ====
Santana tore his shoulder capsule for the second time during early 2013. Surgery was performed on April 3, 2013, by Dr. David Altchek. He missed the entire 2013 season. On November 1, 2013, the Mets bought out his 2014 option for $5.5 million, making Santana a free agent.

=== Later career ===
On March 4, 2014, Santana signed a minor league contract with the Baltimore Orioles. The contract included an invitation to Major League spring training, and Santana was due to earn $3 million if he made the Major League roster. On June 6, Santana tore his Achilles tendon during an extended spring training start. He missed the rest of the 2014 MLB season.

On February 26, 2015, Santana signed a minor league contract with the Toronto Blue Jays. The contract would have paid him $2.5 million if he made the 25-man roster, and it included bonuses for active days and games started. Santana started the season on the disabled list of the Triple-A Buffalo Bisons while rehabbing the shoulder muscles in his throwing arm. On June 27, Santana announced that he was ending his 2015 season due to a toe infection and planned to resume his comeback in 2016.

== Pitching style ==
Santana's pitch repertoire included an 88–94 mph fastball along with a circle changeup, which was generally considered his best pitch, and a slider.

== Personal life ==
Santana is the second of five children. He attended Jose Nucete Sardi High School, where he played center field. He and his wife, Yasmile, whom he has known since he was nine years old, have two daughters and a son. Santana missed the New York Mets' 2009 first regular-season game at Citi Field due to the birth of his son. He and his family reside in the Miromar Lakes community in Estero, Florida in Lee County.

As a child playing in Little League, Santana wanted to play shortstop until coaches told him he couldn't play shortstop because he was a lefty. He then taught himself to throw right-handed so he could play shortstop.

In 2006, Santana founded The Johan Santana Foundation to provide assistance to hospitals. Also in 2006, Santana and the Minnesota Twins purchased a yellow fire truck for Tovar's fire department. All proceeds from Johan's charity wine, Santana's Select, support his foundation. In 2012, the foundation contributed to Tuesday's Children, an organization that helps families impacted by 9/11 and individuals who have lost loved ones to terrorism around the world.

Santana was accused of sexual battery by a woman following an incident that took place on a golf course in Florida on October 28, 2009. No criminal charges were filed. Santana contended that he had a consensual sexual encounter with his accuser. Santana's accuser later filed a civil lawsuit and Santana countersued, alleging extortion. The matter was settled out of court in November 2012.

Santana was elected to the Twins Hall of Fame in 2018 with a pregame ceremony held at Target Field on August 4.

== Highlights ==
- Sports Illustrated MLB All-Decade Team (2009)
- American League Cy Young Award winner (2004 and 2006, both unanimous selections)
- TSN Pitcher of the Year (2004, 2006)
- Player's Choice Outstanding Pitcher (2004, 2006)
- All-Star (2005–2007, 2009)
- American League Gold Glove Award winner (2007)
- Fielding Bible Award (2007)
- Warren Spahn Award winner (2004, 2006)
- Won the Triple Crown as the leader in wins (19), strikeouts (245), and ERA (2.77) in 2006
- Led AL in wins (2006)
- Led AL in strikeouts (2004, 2005, 2006)
- Led AL in ERA (2004, 2006)
- Led NL in ERA (2008), finishing the season at (2.53). He also set a career high in IP (234.1)
- Led American League in winning percentage in 2003, finishing the season at 12–3 (.800)
- Threw 15 career complete games
- Top 10 Cy Young Award (7th, 2003; Winner, 2004; 3rd, 2005; Winner, 2006; 5th, 2007; 3rd 2008)
- Top 10 MVP Award (7th, 2006)
- Fanned former teammate David Ortiz for his 1,000th career strikeout (June 13, 2006).
- Set a Minnesota Twins record with 17 strikeouts over eight innings against the Rangers.(August 19, 2007)
- Signed the biggest contract for a pitcher in the history of baseball (February 1, 2008).
- Threw the first no-hitter in New York Mets history on June 1, 2012, against the St. Louis Cardinals.

== See also ==
- List of Major League Baseball career strikeout leaders
- List of Major League Baseball career WHIP leaders
- List of Major League Baseball no-hitters
- List of Major League Baseball players from Venezuela
- List of Minnesota Twins team records
- Major League Baseball titles leaders
- Minnesota Twins award winners and league leaders
- New York Mets award winners and league leaders

Awards and achievements
Preceded by Jered Weaver	No-hitter pitcher June 1, 2012	Succeeded by Kevin Millwood, Charlie Furbush, Stephen Pryor, Lucas Luetge, Brandon League, & Tom Wilhelmsen
