= 2002 Minnesota Twins season =

2002 Minnesota Twins
- American League Central champions
- League: American League
- Division: Central
- Ballpark: Hubert H. Humphrey Metrodome
- City: Minneapolis
- Record: 94–67 (.584)
- Divisional place: 1st
- Owners: Carl Pohlad
- General managers: Terry Ryan
- Managers: Ron Gardenhire
- Television: KSTC-TV; Fox Sports North (Bert Blyleven, Dick Bremer)
- Radio: 830 WCCO AM (Herb Carneal, John Gordon, Dan Gladden)

The 2002 Minnesota Twins season was the 42nd season for the Minnesota Twins franchise in the Twin Cities of Minnesota, their 21st season at the Hubert H. Humphrey Metrodome and the 102nd overall in the American League. After nearly folding as part of the 2001 Major League Baseball contraction plan, and coming out of a second-place finish in the AL Central with a pitching staff with only two players with an ERA under 4.00, they still won their division and made it to the ALCS with the youngest team in the league, and with a new manager, Ron Gardenhire. The Twins had a solid first half of the season (45–36), but had a better second half (49–31), which led them to being the division champions. This was the Twins' last season with David Ortiz, as he left the Twins for the Red Sox after the 2002 season.

== New alternate logos ==
For the 2002 season, the Twins adopted a secondary logo based on those used from 1970 to 1986, with twins (one representing Minneapolis and the other St. Paul) shaking hands while standing by the river which separates the two cities. The logo also features the team's primary logo, replacing the "Win Twins!" baseball used in the 1976–1986 version.

The season also marked the revival of the "TC" cap logo, which had last been used as such in 1986.

== Offseason ==
- November 7, 2001: David Lamb was signed by the Twins as a free agent.
- January 23, 2002: Mike Jackson was signed by the Twins as a free agent.

== Regular season ==
- May 6: The 2002 NCAA National women's hockey champion Minnesota Duluth Bulldogs were recognized by the Minnesota Twins baseball team at the Metrodome in Minneapolis.
- June 4: The Twins walloped the hapless Cleveland Indians 23–2, setting a club record for their largest winning margin and tying their record for most RBI with 22. Pitcher Rick Reed was lifted after seven innings with a 21-run lead. In the game, Luis Rivas scored five times, joining three other Twins who have accomplished that mark before: Rod Carew (1977), Tim Teufel (1983) and Paul Molitor (1996).
- The representatives of the Twins in the All-Star Game were closer Eddie Guardado, center fielder Torii Hunter, and catcher A. J. Pierzynski.
- October 9: A home attendance record was set when 55,990 watched the Twins lose to the Anaheim Angels in the second game of the American League Championship Series.
- The Twins made just 74 errors this season, their best-ever showing in the field. The worst season was the inaugural campaign of 1961, when they committed 174 errors.
- Jacque Jones had 11 lead-off home runs this season, the second-best season total in American League history, trailing just Brady Anderson's 12 in 1996.
- The highest paid Twin in 2002 was Brad Radke at $8,750,000; followed by Rick Reed at $7,000,000.
- October 28: Pitcher Michael Jackson was granted free agency, and would later sign with the Arizona Diamondbacks. This season he wore number '42', being grandfathered in after Major League Baseball retired the number league-wide in 1997 to honor pioneer Jackie Robinson. Players wearing the number at that time were allowed to continue. Jackson was the last Minnesota Twin to wear the number '42'.
- Bert Blyleven and Tom Kelly were inducted into the Twins Hall of Fame.

=== Offense ===
No player hit 30 home runs or drove in 100 RBIs, but many players enjoyed solid seasons. Torii Hunter and Jacque Jones hit 29 and 27 home runs, respectively, while designated hitter David Ortiz battled injuries and hit 20. Catcher A. J. Pierzynski had a good year for a catcher, hitting .300. First baseman Doug Mientkiewicz saw his average drop significantly from the prior year, from .306 to .261. Third baseman Corey Koskie had a subpar year offensively, shortstop Cristian Guzmán was average, and second baseman Luis Rivas was not strong. The Twins enjoyed solid production out of the right field spot, whether the position was manned by opening day starter Brian Buchanan, Dustan Mohr, Bobby Kielty, or Michael Cuddyer.

Team Leaders
Statistic	Player	Quantity
HR	Torii Hunter	29
RBI	Torii Hunter	94
BA	Jacque Jones	.300
Runs	Jacque Jones	96

=== Pitching ===
The starting rotation resembled a tubercular ward. Brad Radke, Eric Milton, and Joe Mays suffered serious injuries, requiring Rick Reed to carry the starting rotation. He was able to fulfill this role, going 9–2 in the second half. For inexplicable reasons, manager Ron Gardenhire resisted putting Johan Santana into the starter role until he was forced to by injuries. Santana started only 14 games, but quickly established himself as a dominant starting pitcher, posting an 8–6 record, 2.99 ERA, and a team-leading 137 strikeouts. Kyle Lohse enjoyed his only solid year as a starter, going 13–8 with a 4.23 ERA. Matt Kinney also made 12 starts. Eddie Guardado excelled in his first full year as the team's closer, earning 45 saves, while J. C. Romero, LaTroy Hawkins, and Mike Jackson had strong years as set-up men. Tony Fiore had a bafflingly strong year out of the bullpen, going 10–3 with an ERA of 3.16.

Team Leaders
Statistic	Player	Quantity
ERA	Rick Reed	3.78
Wins	Rick Reed	15
Saves	Eddie Guardado	45
Strikeouts	Johan Santana	137

=== Defense ===
A. J. Pierzynski was the team's all-star starting catcher, backed up by Tom Prince. Doug Mientkiewicz followed up his Gold Glove year with another superb year defensively. Unfortunately, his relatively weak hitting in 2002 may have prevented him from winning a second consecutive Gold Glove award, as it went to John Olerud. The rest of the infield was defensively solid, with Luis Rivas at second, Cristian Guzmán at short, and Corey Koskie at third. In the outfield, two-thirds of the "Soul Patrol" remained, with Jacque Jones in left and Torii Hunter in center. (This would be Hunter's second consecutive Gold Glove year.) Right field was a question mark, with Brian Buchanan not lasting long after being the opening day right fielder. The void was filled for most of the season by the platoon of Dustan Mohr and Bobby Kielty, known collectively by fans as "Dusty Kielmohr". However, Dusty Kielmohr gave way to Michael Cuddyer for the post-season run.

=== Season standings ===
AL Central
Team	W	L	Pct.	GB	Home	Road
Minnesota Twins	94	67	.584	—	54‍–‍27	40‍–‍40
Chicago White Sox	81	81	.500	13½	47‍–‍34	34‍–‍47
Cleveland Indians	74	88	.457	20½	39‍–‍42	35‍–‍46
Kansas City Royals	62	100	.383	32½	37‍–‍44	25‍–‍56
Detroit Tigers	55	106	.342	39	33‍–‍47	22‍–‍59

=== American League Wild Card ===
Division leaders
Team	W	L	Pct.
New York Yankees	103	58	.640
Minnesota Twins	94	67	.584
Oakland Athletics	103	59	.636

Wild Card team (Top team qualifies for postseason)
Team	W	L	Pct.	GB
Anaheim Angels	99	63	.611	—
Boston Red Sox	93	69	.574	6
Seattle Mariners	93	69	.574	6
Chicago White Sox	81	81	.500	18
Toronto Blue Jays	78	84	.481	21
Cleveland Indians	74	88	.457	25
Texas Rangers	72	90	.444	27
Baltimore Orioles	67	95	.414	32
Kansas City Royals	62	100	.383	37
Detroit Tigers	55	106	.342	43½
Tampa Bay Devil Rays	55	106	.342	43½

=== Record vs. opponents ===
2002 American League record Source: MLB Standings Grid – 2002
Team	ANA	BAL	BOS	CWS	CLE	DET	KC	MIN	NYY	OAK	SEA	TB	TEX	TOR	NL
Anaheim	—	7–2	3–4	6–3	6–3	8–1	6–3	4–5	3–4	9–11	9–10	8–1	12–7	7–2	11–7
Baltimore	2–7	—	6–13	3–4	1–5	2–4	7–0	5–1	6–13	4–5	5–4	10–9	3–6	4–15	9–9
Boston	4–3	13–6	—	2–4	5–4	5–4	4–2	3–3	9–10	6–3	4–5	16–3	4–3	13–6	5–13
Chicago	3–6	4–3	4–2	—	9–10	12–7	11–8	8–11	2–4	2–7	5–4	4–3	5–4	4–2	8–10
Cleveland	3–6	5–1	4–5	10–9	—	10–9	9–10	8–11	3–6	2–5	3–4	4–2	4–5	3–3	6–12
Detroit	1–8	4–2	4–5	7–12	9–10	—	9–10	4–14	1–8	1–6	2–5	2–4	5–4	0–6	6–12
Kansas City	3–6	0–7	2–4	8–11	10–9	10–9	—	5–14	1–5	1–8	3–6	4–2	7–2	3–4	5–13
Minnesota	5–4	1–5	3–3	11–8	11–8	14–4	14–5	—	0–6	3–6	5–4	5–2	6–3	6–1	10–8
New York	4–3	13–6	10–9	4–2	6–3	8–1	5–1	6–0	—	5–4	4–5	13–5	4–3	10–9	11–7
Oakland	11–9	5–4	3–6	7–2	5–2	6–1	8–1	6–3	4–5	—	8–11	8–1	13–6	3–6	16–2
Seattle	10–9	4–5	5–4	4–5	4–3	5–2	6–3	4–5	5–4	11–8	—	5–4	13–7	6–3	11–7
Tampa Bay	1–8	9–10	3–16	3–4	2–4	4–2	2–4	2–5	5–13	1–8	4–5	—	4–5	8–11	7–11
Texas	7–12	6–3	3–4	4–5	5–4	4–5	2–7	3–6	3–4	6–13	7–13	5–4	—	8–1	9–9
Toronto	2–7	15–4	6–13	2–4	3–3	6–0	4–3	1–6	9–10	6–3	3–6	11–8	1–8	—	9–9

=== Notable transactions ===
- April 15, 2002: Mike Trombley was signed by the Twins as a free agent.
- June 3, 2002: Mike Trombley was released by the Twins.
- June 4, 2002: Jesse Crain was drafted by the Twins in the 2nd round of the 2002 Major League Baseball draft.
- June 19, 2002: José Rodríguez was signed as a free agent by the Twins.
- July 12, 2002: Brian Buchanan was traded by the Twins to the San Diego Padres for Jason Bartlett.

=== Roster ===
2002 Minnesota Twins
Roster
Pitchers: 28 Jack Cressend; 52 Tony Fiore; 50 Kevin Frederick; 19 Eddie Guardado; 32 LaTroy Hawkins; 42 Mike Jackson; 51 Matt Kinney; 49 Kyle Lohse; 25 Joe Mays; 20 Travis Miller; 21 Eric Milton; 22 Brad Radke; 31 Rick Reed; 39 Juan Rincón; 20 José Rodríguez; 33 J. C. Romero; 57 Johan Santana; 19 Mike Trombley; 46 Bob Wells	Catchers: 26 A. J. Pierzynski; 12 Tom Prince; 8 Javier Valentín; Infielders: 38 Casey Blake; 1 Jay Canizaro; 15 Cristian Guzmán; 7 Denny Hocking; 47 Corey Koskie; 24 Matthew LeCroy; 16 Doug Mientkiewicz; 36 Warren Morris; 27 David Ortiz; 2 Luis Rivas; 58 Todd Sears	Outfielders: 30 Brian Buchanan; 5 Michael Cuddyer; 48 Torii Hunter; 11 Jacque Jones; 23 Bobby Kielty; 44 David Lamb; 17 Dustan Mohr; 41 Michael Restovich; 54 Michael Ryan	Manager: 35 Ron Gardenhire; Coaches: 40 Rick Anderson; 62 Al Newman; 9 Steve Liddle; 43 Rick Stelmaszek; 45 Scott Ullger; 13 Jerry White

== Player stats ==
=== Batting ===
==== Starters by position ====
Note: Pos = Position; G = Games played; AB = At bats; H = Hits; Avg. = Batting average; HR = Home runs; RBI = Runs batted in

Pos	Player	G	AB	H	Avg.	HR	RBI
C	A. J. Pierzynski	130	440	132	.300	6	49
1B	Doug Mientkiewicz	143	467	122	.261	10	64
2B	Luis Rivas	93	316	81	.256	4	35
SS	Cristian Guzmán	148	623	170	.273	9	59
3B	Corey Koskie	140	490	131	.267	15	69
LF	Jacque Jones	149	577	173	.300	27	85
CF	Torii Hunter	148	561	162	.289	29	94
RF	Dustan Mohr	120	383	103	.269	12	45
DH	David Ortiz	125	412	112	.272	20	75

==== Other batters ====
Note: G = Games played; AB = At bats; H = Hits; Avg. = Batting average; HR = Home runs; RBI = Runs batted in

Player	G	AB	H	Avg.	HR	RBI
Bobby Kielty	112	289	84	.291	12	46
Denny Hocking	102	260	65	.250	2	25
Matt LeCroy	63	181	47	.260	7	27
Brian Buchanan	44	135	34	.252	5	15
Tom Prince	51	125	28	.224	4	16
Jay Canizaro	38	112	24	.214	0	11
Michael Cuddyer	41	112	29	.259	4	13
Casey Blake	9	20	4	.200	0	1
Michael Restovich	8	13	4	.308	1	1
Todd Sears	7	12	4	.333	0	0
Michael Ryan	7	11	1	.091	0	0
David Lamb	7	10	1	.100	0	0
Warren Morris	4	7	0	.000	0	0
Javier Valentín	4	4	2	.500	0	0

=== Pitching ===
==== Starting pitchers ====
Note: G = Games pitched; IP = Innings pitched; W = Wins; L = Losses; ERA = Earned run average; SO = Strikeouts

Player	G	IP	W	L	ERA	SO
Rick Reed	33	188.0	15	7	3.78	121
Kyle Lohse	32	180.2	13	8	4.23	124
Eric Milton	29	171.0	13	9	4.84	121
Brad Radke	21	118.1	9	5	4.72	62
Joe Mays	17	95.1	4	8	5.38	38
Matt Kinney	14	66.0	2	7	4.64	45

==== Other pitchers ====
Note: G = Games pitched; IP = Innings pitched; W = Wins; L = Losses; ERA = Earned run average; SO = Strikeouts

Player	G	IP	W	L	ERA	SO
Johan Santana	27	108.1	8	6	2.99	137
Juan Rincón	10	28.2	0	2	6.28	21

==== Relief pitchers ====
Note: G = Games pitched; W = Wins; L = Losses; SV = Saves; ERA = Earned run average; SO = Strikeouts

Player	G	W	L	SV	ERA	SO
Eddie Guardado	68	1	3	45	2.93	70
J. C. Romero	81	9	2	1	1.89	76
LaTroy Hawkins	65	6	0	0	2.13	63
Mike Jackson	58	2	3	0	3.27	29
Tony Fiore	48	10	3	0	3.16	55
Bob Wells	48	2	1	0	5.90	30
Jack Cressend	23	0	1	0	5.91	22
Kevin Frederick	8	0	0	0	10.03	5
Mike Trombley	5	0	1	0	15.75	3
Travis Miller	5	0	0	0	4.50	3
José Rodríguez	4	0	1	0	14.73	1

== Postseason ==
The Twins made it to the ALCS, beating the Oakland Athletics in the Divisional series. They then lost to the eventual World Series Champions, the Anaheim Angels.

=== Divisional Series ===
The Twins won Game One at Oakland before losing two straight including one at home. The Twins rebounded, and won the final two games to win the series and move on to face Anaheim in the ALCS.

==== Game One ====
October 1, at Oakland

Team	1	2	3	4	5	6	7	8	9	R	H	E
Minnesota	0	1	2	0	0	3	1	0	0	7	13	3
Oakland	3	2	0	0	0	0	0	0	0	5	12	0
W: Brad Radke (1–0) L: Ted Lilly (0–1) SV: Eddie Guardado (1)
HRs: MIN – Corey Koskie (1), Doug Mientkiewicz (1)

==== Game Two ====
October 2, at Oakland

Team	1	2	3	4	5	6	7	8	9	R	H	E
Minnesota	0	0	0	0	0	1	0	0	0	1	7	0
Oakland	3	0	0	5	1	0	0	0	0	9	14	0
W: Mark Mulder (1–0) L: Joe Mays (0–1)
HRs: OAK – Eric Chavez (1),MIN – Cristian Guzmán (1)

==== Game Three ====
October 4, at Minnesota

Team	1	2	3	4	5	6	7	8	9	R	H	E
Oakland	2	0	0	1	0	1	2	0	0	6	9	1
Minnesota	0	0	0	1	2	0	0	0	0	3	8	0
W: Barry Zito (1–0) L: Rick Reed (0–1)
HRs: OAK – Ray Durham (1), Scott Hatteberg (1), Terrence Long (1), Jermaine Dye, (1)

==== Game Four ====
October 5, at Minnesota

Team	1	2	3	4	5	6	7	8	9	R	H	E
Oakland	0	0	2	0	0	0	0	0	0	2	7	2
Minnesota	0	0	2	7	0	0	2	0	X	11	12	0
W: Eric Milton (1–0) L: Tim Hudson (0–1)
HRs: OAK – Miguel Tejada (1),MIN – Doug Mientkiewicz (2)

==== Game Five ====
October 6, at Oakland

Team	1	2	3	4	5	6	7	8	9	R	H	E
Minnesota	0	1	1	0	0	0	0	0	3	5	12	0
Oakland	0	0	1	0	0	0	0	0	3	4	11	0
W: Brad Radke (2–0) L: Mark Mulder (1-1)
HRs: OAK – Ray Durham (2), Mark Ellis (1) MIN – A. J. Pierzynski (1)

=== ALCS ===
The Twins won the first game at home vs. the Angels, before losing the next four in a row, allowing the Angels to move on to the World Series, who won the Series in seven games against the San Francisco Giants.

==== Game One ====
October 8, at Minnesota

Team	1	2	3	4	5	6	7	8	9	R	H	E
Anaheim	0	0	1	0	0	0	0	0	0	1	4	0
Minnesota	0	1	0	0	1	0	0	0	X	2	5	1
W: Joe Mays (1–0) L: Kevin Appier (0–1) SV: Eddie Guardado (1)
HRs: None

==== Game Two ====
October 9, at Minnesota

Team	1	2	3	4	5	6	7	8	9	R	H	E
Anaheim	1	3	0	0	0	2	0	0	0	6	10	0
Minnesota	0	0	0	0	0	3	0	0	0	3	11	1
W: Ramón Ortiz (1–0) L: Rick Reed (0–1) SV: Troy Percival (1)
HRs: ANA – Darin Erstad (1), Brad Fullmer (1)

==== Game Three ====
October 11, at Anaheim

Team	1	2	3	4	5	6	7	8	9	R	H	E
Minnesota	0	0	0	0	0	0	1	0	0	1	6	0
Anaheim	0	1	0	0	0	0	0	1	X	2	7	2
W: Francisco Rodríguez (1–0) L: J. C. Romero (0–1) SV: Troy Percival (2)
HRs: ANA – Garret Anderson (1), Troy Glaus (1)

==== Game Four ====
October 12, at Anaheim

Team	1	2	3	4	5	6	7	8	9	R	H	E
Minnesota	0	0	0	0	0	0	0	0	1	1	6	2
Anaheim	0	0	0	0	0	0	2	5	X	7	10	0
W: John Lackey (1–0) L: Brad Radke (0–1)
HRs: None

==== Game Five ====
October 13, at Anaheim

Team	1	2	3	4	5	6	7	8	9	R	H	E
Minnesota	1	1	0	0	0	0	3	0	0	5	9	0
Anaheim	0	0	1	0	2	0	10	0	X	13	18	0
W: Francisco Rodríguez (2–0) L: Johan Santana (0–1)
HRs: ANA – Adam Kennedy (3), Scott Spiezio (1)

- October 14: Released Casey Blake.
- October 17: Pitcher Jack Cressend selected off waivers by the Cleveland Indians.
- November 15: Traded pitcher Matt Kinney and catcher Javier Valentín to the Milwaukee Brewers for minor leaguers Gerry Oakes and Matt Yeatman.
- November 22: Signed pitcher Carlos Pulido as a free agent. Pulido had last played in the majors in 1994 (also for the Twins).
- December 16, 2002: Released DH David Ortiz.

== Other post-season awards ==
- Calvin R. Griffith Award (Most Valuable Twin) – Torii Hunter
- Joseph W. Haynes Award (Twins Pitcher of the Year) – Eddie Guardado
- Bill Boni Award (Twins Outstanding Rookie) – Bobby Kielty
- Charles O. Johnson Award (Most Improved Twin) – LaTroy Hawkins
- Dick Siebert Award (Upper Midwest Player of the Year) – Jarrod Washburn
  - The above awards are voted on by the Twin Cities chapter of the BBWAA
- Carl R. Pohlad Award (Outstanding Community Service) – Brad Radke
- Sherry Robertson Award (Twins Outstanding Farm System Position Player) – Lew Ford
- Jim Rantz Award (Twins Outstanding Farm System Pitcher) – J. D. Durbin

== Farm system ==
Level	Team	League	Manager
AAA	Edmonton Trappers	Pacific Coast League	John Russell
AA	New Britain Rock Cats	Eastern League	Stan Cliburn
A	Fort Myers Miracle	Florida State League	Jose Marzan
A	Quad Cities River Bandits	Midwest League	Jeff Carter
Rookie	Elizabethton Twins	Appalachian League	Ray Smith
Rookie	GCL Twins	Gulf Coast League	Rudy Hernández

LEAGUE CHAMPIONS: Edmonton

== Sources ==
- 2002 Twins schedule with wins, losses, record, and scores Accessed June 20, 2006
- 2002 Twins Preview, by Adam J. Ulrey Accessed June 20, 2006
- 2002 Twins roster by Baseball Almanac Accessed June 20, 2006
- 2006 Minnesota Twins Record & Information book, pgs 278–280, copyright 2006 by the Minnesota Twins
- 2002 Oakland Athletics Roster by Baseball Almanac Accessed June 21, 2006
- 2002 ALCS at Baseball-Reference.com Accessed June 22, 2006
