= 2003 Minnesota Twins season =

2003 Minnesota Twins
- American League Central champions
- League: American League
- Division: Central
- Ballpark: Hubert H. Humphrey Metrodome
- City: Minneapolis
- Record: 90–72 (.556)
- Divisional place: 1st
- Owners: Carl Pohlad
- General managers: Terry Ryan
- Managers: Ron Gardenhire
- Television: KSTC-TV; FSN North (Bert Blyleven, Dick Bremer)
- Radio: 830 WCCO AM (Herb Carneal, John Gordon, Dan Gladden)

The 2003 Minnesota Twins season was the 43rd season for the Minnesota Twins franchise in the Twin Cities of Minnesota, their 22nd season at Hubert H. Humphrey Metrodome and the 103rd overall in the American League.

After winning the American League Central in 2002, the Twins were looking to repeat division titles for the first time since 1969 and 1970. A spark for the team was the July trade of Bobby Kielty for Shannon Stewart. Stewart provided a veteran presence at the top of the lineup that the team had previously lacked. The team met its goal of reaching the playoffs, but once again fell short in the postseason. The Twins lost in four games to the New York Yankees during the ALDS. 2003 would be the last year several key players played with the team.

== Offseason ==
- October 14, 2002: Casey Blake was released by the Twins.
- October 21, 2002: José Rodríguez was released by the Twins.
- November 15, 2002: Matt Kinney and Javier Valentín were traded by the Twins to the Milwaukee Brewers for minor leaguers Gerry Oakes and Matt Yeatman. Oakes' 98 mph fastball and diverse athletic talent was a prize that many MLB teams were after.
- November 22, 2002: Carlos Pulido was signed as a free agent by the Twins.
- December 16, 2002: David Ortiz was released by the Twins.
- March 17, 2003: Kenny Rogers was signed by the Twins as a free agent.

== Regular season ==
Under second year manager Ron Gardenhire, The Twins did not look so good coming out of the gates, going 12–14 in March and April. However, they picked it up by going 19–9 in May, improving their record to 31-23 (.574). After having another tough string of games during the middle of the season, the Twins were looking for a jump start. They got it when on July 16 they traded RF Bobby Kielty to Toronto for LF Shannon Stewart. Going into the final month of the season with a record of 71-65 it looked as though the Twins may not win the division, but they finished with a stellar September going 19–7; including an 11-game winning streak. They ended up with a 90-72 (.556) record which was good enough to win the mediocre AL Central.

On April 21, Rick Reed set a Twins individual pitching record by giving up 11 runs (ten were earned) in a 15–1 loss to the New York Yankees.

On June 7 at Qualcomm Stadium, outfielder Jacque Jones hit his 20th lead-off home run as a Minnesota Twin and the total remains the Twins record. Jones' first two career homers in 1999 were lead-off home runs. Chuck Knoblauch is next in line with 14.

June 17: In a 14–7 loss to the Kansas City Royals, the Twins gave up 12 runs in the sixth inning, a club high. Kenny Rogers blew a 3–1 lead allowing four runs. The final six were allowed by Michael Nakamura.

The lone representative of the Twins in the All-Star Game was closer Eddie Guardado; he gave up two hits and a run on eight pitches.

The highest paid Twin in 2003 was Brad Radke at $8,750,000; followed by Rick Reed at $8,000,000.

Bob Allison and Bob Casey were inducted into the Twins Hall of Fame.

=== Offense ===
Catcher A. J. Pierzynski enjoyed his highest career batting average (.312) in his final year with the Twins. First baseman Doug Mientkiewicz rebounded from a poor 2002 season by hitting .300—although his power numbers (11 home runs) were low for his position. Luis Rivas cemented his reputation as a mediocre hitter, batting .259 with a .308 on-base percentage. Corey Koskie saw his average go up to .292 after a dip in 2002. For the third time in four years, shortstop Cristian Guzmán led the majors in triples this year with 14. Jacque Jones and Torii Hunter were capable hitters in the outfield, with Jones batting .304 and Hunter driving in a career high 102 runs. Stewart hit .322 in 270 at bats for the team.

Team leaders
Statistic	Player	Quantity
HR	Torii Hunter	26
RBI	Torii Hunter	102
BA	A. J. Pierzynski	.312
Runs	Torii Hunter	83

=== Pitching ===
Brad Radke, Kenny Rogers, and Kyle Lohse filled the first three spots in the starting rotation throughout the year. All three had winning records and ERAs in the mid-fours. Joe Mays and Rick Reed each made 21 mediocre starts. The leftover starts were mostly left to Johan Santana, who made 18, establishing a foundation that would enable him to win a Cy Young Award the following year. Eric Milton was injured most of the year, and appeared in only three games.

In the bullpen, Eddie Guardado was once again a reliable closer, with LaTroy Hawkins as his primary set-up man. Juan Rincón was also able to establish himself as a reliable set-up man, but the other bullpen spots were uncertain. J. C. Romero regressed in quality, with a 5.00 ERA. As one might expect, experiments with veterans such as James Baldwin, Carlos Pulido, and the ancient Jesse Orosco did not pan out.

Team leaders
Statistic	Player	Quantity
ERA	Brad Radke	4.49
Wins	Brad Radke and Kyle Lohse	14
Saves	Eddie Guardado	41
Strikeouts	Johan Santana	169

=== Defense ===
The infield of Pierzynski, Mientkiewicz, Rivas, Guzman, and Koskie was reliable. Jacque Jones was solid in left, although Shannon Stewart saw time there when he was acquired for Bobby Kielty. Torii Hunter had a Gold Glove year in center field. Right field was manned by the platoon of Dustan Mohr and Bobby Kielty (the duo was dubbed "Dusty Kielmohr") until the arrival of Stewart.

=== Season standings ===
AL Central
Team	W	L	Pct.	GB	Home	Road
Minnesota Twins	90	72	.556	—	48‍–‍33	42‍–‍39
Chicago White Sox	86	76	.531	4	51‍–‍30	35‍–‍46
Kansas City Royals	83	79	.512	7	40‍–‍40	43‍–‍39
Cleveland Indians	68	94	.420	22	38‍–‍43	30‍–‍51
Detroit Tigers	43	119	.265	47	23‍–‍58	20‍–‍61

=== Record vs. opponents ===
2003 American League record Source: MLB Standings Grid – 2003
Team	ANA	BAL	BOS	CWS	CLE	DET	KC	MIN	NYY	OAK	SEA	TB	TEX	TOR	NL
Anaheim	—	1–8	3–6	3–4	6–3	6–1	6–3	5–4	3–6	8–12	8–11	6–3	9–10	2–7	11–7
Baltimore	8–1	—	9–10	2–4	3–3	3–3	3–4	3–4	6–13–1	2–7	4–5	8–11	7–2	8–11	5–13
Boston	6–3	10–9	—	5–4	4–2	8–1	5–1	2–4	9–10	3–4	5–2	12–7	5–4	10–9	11–7
Chicago	4–3	4–2	4–5	—	11–8	11–8	11–8	9–10	4–2	4–5	2–7	3–3	3–4	6–3	10–8
Cleveland	3–6	3–3	2–4	8–11	—	12–7	6–13	9–10	2–5	3–6	3–6	5–2	4–5	2–4	6–12
Detroit	1–6	3–3	1–8	8–11	7–12	—	5–14	4–15	1–5	3–6	1–8	2–4	1–6	2–7	4–14
Kansas City	3–6	4–3	1–5	8–11	13–6	14–5	—	11–8	2–4	2–7	4–5	4–3	7–2	1–5	9–9
Minnesota	4–5	4–3	4–2	10–9	10–9	15–4	8–11	—	0–7	8–1	3–6	6–0	5–4	3–3	10–8
New York	6–3	13–6–1	10–9	2–4	5–2	5–1	4–2	7–0	—	3–6	5–4	14–5	4–5	10–9	13–5
Oakland	12–8	7–2	4–3	5–4	6–3	6–3	7–2	1–8	6–3	—	7–12	6–3	15–4	5–2	9–9
Seattle	11–8	5–4	2–5	7–2	6–3	8–1	5–4	6–3	4–5	12–7	—	4–5	10–10	3–4	10–8
Tampa Bay	3–6	11–8	7–12	3–3	2–5	4–2	3–4	0–6	5–14	3–6	5–4	—	3–6	11–8	3–15
Texas	10–9	2–7	4–5	4–3	5–4	6–1	2–7	4–5	5–4	4–15	10–10	6–3	—	5–4	4–14
Toronto	7–2	11–8	9–10	3–6	4–2	7–2	5–1	3–3	9–10	2–5	4–3	8–11	4–5	—	10–8

=== Notable transactions ===
- June 10, 2003: James Baldwin was signed by the Twins as a free agent.
- July 16, 2003: Bobby Kielty was traded by the Twins to the Toronto Blue Jays for Shannon Stewart.
- August 17, 2003: James Baldwin was released by the Twins.
- August 31, 2003: The Twins traded a player to be named later to the New York Yankees for pitcher Jesse Orosco. The Twins completed the deal by sending Juan Padilla to the Yankees on September 2.

=== Roster ===
2003 Minnesota Twins
Roster
Pitchers: 30 James Baldwin; 19 Grant Balfour; 55 Mike Fetters; 52 Tony Fiore; 18 Eddie Guardado; 32 LaTroy Hawkins; 38 Adam Johnson; 49 Kyle Lohse; 25 Joe Mays; 21 Eric Milton; 59 Micheal Nakamura; 50 Jesse Orosco; 51 Carlos Pulido; 22 Brad Radke; 31 Rick Reed; 39 Juan Rincón; 37 Kenny Rogers; 33 J. C. Romero; 57 Johan Santana; 56 Brad Thomas	Catchers: 44 Rob Bowen; 24 Matthew LeCroy; 26 A. J. Pierzynski; 12 Tom Prince; Infielders: 8 Chris Gomez; 15 Cristian Guzmán; 7 Denny Hocking; 47 Corey Koskie; 16 Doug Mientkiewicz; 27 Justin Morneau; 46 Alex Prieto; 2 Luis Rivas; 58 Todd Sears	Outfielders: 5 Michael Cuddyer; 20 Lew Ford; 48 Torii Hunter; 11 Jacque Jones; 23 Bobby Kielty; 17 Dustan Mohr; 41 Michael Restovich; 54 Michael Ryan; 23 Shannon Stewart	Manager: 35 Ron Gardenhire; Coaches: 40 Rick Anderson (pitching); 62 Al Newman (third base); 9 Steve Liddle (bench); 43 Rick Stelmaszek (bullpen); 45 Scott Ullger (hitting); 13 Jerry White (first base)

== Postseason ==
In the American League Division Series, the Twins faced a team which fared well against them in the regular season: The New York Yankees. The Yankees won the 5-game series in four games, outscoring the Twins 16–6. Minnesota defeated the Yankees in game 1, earning a 3–1 victory at Yankee Stadium. However, the Yankees would go on to win the series; winning the next three games 4–1, 3–1, and 8–1. The Yankees eventually lost to the Florida Marlins in the World Series.

See also 2003 American League Division Series.

== Player stats ==
=== Batting ===
==== Starters by position ====
Note: Pos = Position; G = Games played; AB = At bats; H = Hits; Avg. = Batting average; HR = Home runs; RBI = Runs batted in

Pos	Player	G	AB	H	Avg.	HR	RBI
C	A. J. Pierzynski	137	487	152	.312	11	74
1B	Doug Mientkiewicz	142	487	146	.300	11	65
2B	Luis Rivas	135	475	123	.259	8	43
SS	Cristian Guzmán	143	534	143	.268	3	53
3B	Corey Koskie	131	469	137	.292	14	69
LF	Jacque Jones	136	517	157	.304	16	69
CF	Torii Hunter	154	581	145	.250	26	102
RF	Dustan Mohr	121	348	87	.250	10	36
DH	Matt LeCroy	107	345	99	.287	17	64

==== Other batters ====
Note: G = Games played; AB = At bats; H = Hits; Avg. = Batting average; HR = Home runs; RBI = Runs batted in

Player	G	AB	H	Avg.	HR	RBI
Shannon Stewart	65	270	87	.322	6	38
Bobby Kielty	75	238	60	.252	9	32
Denny Hocking	83	188	45	.239	3	22
Chris Gomez	58	175	44	.251	1	15
Justin Morneau	40	106	24	.226	4	16
Michael Cuddyer	35	102	25	.245	4	8
Lew Ford	34	73	24	.329	3	15
Todd Sears	24	65	16	.246	2	11
Michael Ryan	27	61	24	.393	5	13
Michael Restovich	24	53	15	.283	0	4
Tom Prince	24	40	8	.200	2	5
Alex Prieto	8	11	1	.091	0	0
Rob Bowen	7	10	1	.100	0	1

=== Pitching ===
==== Starting pitchers ====
Note: G = Games pitched; GS = Games started; IP = Innings pitched; W = Wins; L = Losses; ERA = Earned run average; SO = Strikeouts

Player	G	GS	IP	W	L	ERA	SO
Brad Radke	33	33	212.1	14	10	4.49	120
Kyle Lohse	33	33	201.0	14	11	4.61	130
Kenny Rogers	33	31	195.0	13	8	4.57	116
Rick Reed	27	21	135.0	6	12	5.07	71
Eric Milton	3	3	17.0	1	0	2.65	7

==== Other pitchers ====
Note: G = Games pitched; IP = Innings pitched; W = Wins; L = Losses; ERA = Earned run average; SO = Strikeouts

Player	G	IP	W	L	ERA	SO
Johan Santana	45	158.1	12	3	3.07	169
Joe Mays	31	130.0	8	8	6.30	50
Carlos Pulido	7	15.2	0	1	4.02	6

==== Relief pitchers ====
Note: G = Games pitched; W = Wins; L = Losses; SV = Saves; ERA = Earned run average; SO = Strikeouts

Player	G	W	L	SV	ERA	SO
Eddie Guardado	66	3	5	41	2.89	60
LaTroy Hawkins	74	9	3	2	1.86	75
J. C. Romero	73	2	0	0	5.00	50
Juan Rincón	58	5	6	0	3.68	63
Tony Fiore	21	1	1	0	5.50	23
Grant Balfour	17	1	0	0	4.15	30
Michael Nakamura	12	0	0	1	7.82	14
James Baldwin	10	0	1	1	5.40	7
Jesse Orosco	8	1	1	0	5.79	3
Mike Fetters	5	0	0	0	0.00	1
Brad Thomas	3	0	1	0	7.71	2
Adam Johnson	2	0	1	0	47.25	0

== Other post-season awards ==
- Calvin R. Griffith Award (Most Valuable Twin) – Shannon Stewart
- Joseph W. Haynes Award (Twins Pitcher of the Year) – Johan Santana
- Bill Boni Award (Twins Outstanding Rookie) – Lew Ford
- Charles O. Johnson Award (Most Improved Twin) – Johan Santana
- Dick Siebert Award (Upper Midwest Player of the Year) – Jim Brower
  - The above awards are voted on by the Twin Cities chapter of the BBWAA
- Carl R. Pohlad Award (Outstanding Community Service) – Doug Mientkiewicz
- Sherry Robertson Award (Twins Outstanding Farm System Position Player) – Joe Mauer
- Jim Rantz Award (Twins Outstanding Farm System Pitcher) – Jesse Crain

== Farm system ==
Level	Team	League	Manager
AAA	Rochester Red Wings	International League	Phil Roof
AA	New Britain Rock Cats	Eastern League	Stan Cliburn
A	Fort Myers Miracle	Florida State League	Jose Marzan
A	Quad Cities River Bandits	Midwest League	Jeff Carter
Rookie	Elizabethton Twins	Appalachian League	Ray Smith
Rookie	GCL Twins	Gulf Coast League	Rudy Hernández

LEAGUE CHAMPIONS: Elizabethton
