= 2003 American League Division Series =

Teams
Team (Wins)		Manager	Season
New York Yankees (3)		Joe Torre	101–61 (.623), GA: 6
Minnesota Twins (1)		Ron Gardenhire	90–72 (.556), GA: 4
- Dates: September 30–October 5
- Television: ESPN (Games 1, 3–4); Fox (Game 2)
- TV announcers: Jon Miller and Joe Morgan (Game 1); Joe Buck and Tim McCarver (Game 2); Gary Thorne, Jeff Brantley, and David Justice (Games 3–4)
- Radio: ESPN
- Radio announcers: Dan Shulman and Dave Campbell
- Umpires: Games 1–2 & 5: Ed Montague, Ted Barrett, Paul Emmel, Gerry Davis, Jim Joyce, Bill Welke; Games 3–4: Randy Marsh, Eric Cooper, Wally Bell, Gary Darling, Tim Welke, Greg Gibson

Teams
Team (Wins)		Manager	Season
Boston Red Sox (3)		Grady Little	95–67 (.586), GB: 6
Oakland Athletics (2)		Ken Macha	96–66 (.593), GA: 3
- Dates: October 1–6
- Television: ESPN (Games 1, 4); ESPN2 (Games 2–3); Fox (Game 5)
- TV announcers: Dave O'Brien, David Justice, and Jeff Brantley (Game 1); Jon Miller and Joe Morgan (Games 2–4); Thom Brennaman and Steve Lyons (Game 5)
- Radio: ESPN
- Radio announcers: John Rooney and Buck Martinez
- Umpires: Games 1–2 & 5: Randy Marsh, Eric Cooper, Wally Bell, Gary Darling, Tim Welke, Greg Gibson; Games 3–4: Ed Montague, Ted Barrett, Paul Emmel, Gerry Davis, Jim Joyce, Bill Welke

The 2003 American League Division Series (ALDS) consisted of two best-of-five playoff series on the American League side in Major League Baseball’s (MLB) 2003 postseason, began on Tuesday, September 30, and ended on Monday, October 6, with the champions of the three AL divisions—along with a "wild card" team—participating in two series.

Under MLB's playoff format, no two teams from the same division were matched up in the Division Series, regardless of whether their records would normally indicate such a matchup. Home field advantage went to the team with the better regular-season record with the exception of the wild card team, which defers home field advantage regardless of record. The matchups were:

- (1) New York Yankees (AL East champions) vs. (3) Minnesota Twins (AL Central champions): Yankees won the series, 3–1.
- (2) Oakland Athletics (AL West champions) vs. (4) Boston Red Sox (Wild Card qualifier): Red Sox won the series, 3–2.

The higher seeded team in each series hosts Games 1, 2, and 5 (if necessary), and the lower seeded team hosts Games 3 and 4 (if necessary).

The Yankees defeated the Red Sox in the AL Championship Series, then lost the 2003 World Series to the National League champion Florida Marlins.

== Matchups ==
=== New York Yankees vs. Minnesota Twins ===
New York won the series, 3–1.

Game	Date	Score	Location	Time	Attendance
1	September 30	Minnesota Twins – 3, New York Yankees – 1	Yankee Stadium (I)	3:18	56,292
2	October 2	Minnesota Twins – 1, New York Yankees – 4	Yankee Stadium (I)	3:07	56,479
3	October 4	New York Yankees – 3, Minnesota Twins – 1	Hubert H. Humphrey Metrodome	3:02	55,915
4	October 5	New York Yankees – 8, Minnesota Twins – 1	Hubert H. Humphrey Metrodome	2:49	55,875

=== Oakland Athletics vs. Boston Red Sox ===
Boston won the series, 3–2.

Game	Date	Score	Location	Time	Attendance
1	October 1	Boston Red Sox – 4, Oakland Athletics – 5 (12)	Network Associates Coliseum	4:37	50,606
2	October 2	Boston Red Sox – 1, Oakland Athletics – 5	Network Associates Coliseum	2:37	36,305
3	October 4	Oakland Athletics – 1, Boston Red Sox – 3 (11)	Fenway Park	3:42	35,460
4	October 5	Oakland Athletics – 4, Boston Red Sox – 5	Fenway Park	3:02	35,048
5	October 6	Boston Red Sox – 4, Oakland Athletics – 3	Network Associates Coliseum	3:05	49,397

== New York vs. Minnesota ==
=== Game 1 ===
September 30, 2003 1:06 pm (EDT) at Yankee Stadium (I) in Bronx, New York 62 °F (17 °C), sunny
Team	1	2	3	4	5	6	7	8	9	R	H	E
Minnesota	0	0	1	0	0	2	0	0	0	3	8	0
New York	0	0	0	0	0	0	0	0	1	1	9	1
WP: LaTroy Hawkins (1–0) LP: Mike Mussina (0–1) Sv: Eddie Guardado (1); Attendance: 56,292; Boxscore

The Twins struck first in Game 1 when Cristian Guzman and Shannon Stewart hit back-to-back one-out singles in the third off Mike Mussina, then the former scored on Luis Rivas's sacrifice fly. Matt LeCroy singled to lead off the sixth, then scored on a triple by Torii Hunter, who himself scored on Yankees second baseman Alfonso Soriano's error. The Yankees scored a run in the ninth on Soriano's two-out single with runners on second and third off Eddie Guardado, but Nick Johnson then grounded out to end the game as the Twins, despite using five pitchers, took a 1–0 series lead.

=== Game 2 ===
October 2, 2003 8:18 pm (EDT) at Yankee Stadium (I) in Bronx, New York 52 °F (11 °C), clear
Team	1	2	3	4	5	6	7	8	9	R	H	E
Minnesota	0	0	0	0	1	0	0	0	0	1	4	1
New York	1	0	0	0	0	0	3	0	X	4	8	1
WP: Andy Pettitte (1–0) LP: Brad Radke (0–1) Sv: Mariano Rivera (1); Home runs: MIN: Torii Hunter (1); NYY: None; Attendance: 56,479; Boxscore

The Yankees loaded the bases with no outs on three singles in the first off Brad Radke, but scored just once on Bernie Williams's sacrifice fly. The Twins tied the game in the fifth on Torii Hunter's leadoff home run off Andy Pettitte. Radke hit Nick Johnson to lead off the seventh. After Juan Rivera's sacrifice bunt, LaTroy Hawkins relieved Radke and allowed an RBI single to Alfonso Soriano. Hawkins's error on Derek Jeter's ground ball put him at second and Soriano at third. Both scored on Jason Giambi's single and Mariano Rivera pitched two perfect innings for the save. The Yankees' 4–1 win tied the series heading to Minnesota.

=== Game 3 ===
October 4, 2003 12:06 pm (CDT) at Hubert H. Humphrey Metrodome in Minneapolis, Minnesota 72 °F (22 °C), dome
Team	1	2	3	4	5	6	7	8	9	R	H	E
New York	0	2	1	0	0	0	0	0	0	3	8	1
Minnesota	0	0	1	0	0	0	0	0	0	1	5	0
WP: Roger Clemens (1–0) LP: Kyle Lohse (0–1) Sv: Mariano Rivera (2); Home runs: NYY: Hideki Matsui (1); MIN: A. J. Pierzynski (1); Attendance: 55,915; Boxscore

The Yankees struck first in Game 3 on Hideki Matsui's two-run home run in the second off Kyle Lohse. They added another run next inning on Bernie Williams's single that scored Juan Rivera from second. A. J. Pierzynski's leadoff home run in the bottom of the inning off Roger Clemens cut the lead to 3–1, but neither team scored after that with Mariano Rivera again pitching two perfect innings for a save as the Yankees took a 2–1 series lead.

=== Game 4 ===
October 5, 2003 3:06 pm (CDT) at Hubert H. Humphrey Metrodome in Minneapolis, Minnesota 72 °F (22 °C), dome
Team	1	2	3	4	5	6	7	8	9	R	H	E
New York	0	0	0	6	0	0	0	1	1	8	13	0
Minnesota	0	0	0	1	0	0	0	0	0	1	9	1
WP: David Wells (1–0) LP: Johan Santana (0–1); Home runs: NYY: Derek Jeter (1); MIN: None; Attendance: 55,875; Boxscore

In the fourth, Jason Giambi doubled with one out, then scored on Bernie Williams's double. After Jorge Posada singled, Hideki Matsui's ground-rule double scored Williams. Aaron Boone popped out before Juan Rivera was intentionally walked to load the bases. Nick Johnson's double scored two more and knocked Johan Santana out of the game. Juan Rincon in relief allowed a two-run single to Alfonso Soriano, then walked Derek Jeter and Giambi to load the bases again. Eric Milton relieved Rincon and got Williams to ground out to end the inning. The Twins got on the board in the bottom of the inning on three consecutive singles off David Wells, the last of which by Michael Cuddyer scored Torii Hunter, but could not score again off Wells or Gabe White. The Yankees added a run in the eighth off LaTroy Hawkins when Boone hit a lead off single, stole second and scored on Juan Rivera's bunt single that was misplayed by Hawkins. Jeter's home run in the ninth off Eddie Guardado put the Yankees up 8–1 as they secured their place in the American League Championship Series for the sixth time in eight years.

=== Composite box ===
2003 ALDS (3–1): New York Yankees over Minnesota Twins

Team	1	2	3	4	5	6	7	8	9	R	H	E
New York Yankees	1	2	1	6	0	0	3	1	2	16	38	3
Minnesota Twins	0	0	2	1	1	2	0	0	0	6	26	2
Total attendance: 224,561 Average attendance: 56,140

== Oakland vs. Boston ==
=== Game 1 ===
October 1, 2003 7:06 pm (PDT) at Network Associates Coliseum in Oakland, California 63 °F (17 °C), cloudy
Team	1	2	3	4	5	6	7	8	9	10	11	12	R	H	E
Boston	1	0	0	0	1	0	2	0	0	0	0	0	4	12	2
Oakland	0	0	3	0	0	0	0	0	1	0	0	1	5	8	0
WP: Rich Harden (1–0) LP: Derek Lowe (0–1); Home runs: BOS: Todd Walker 2 (2), Jason Varitek (1); OAK: None; Attendance: 50,606; Boxscore

The Red Sox went up 1–0 in the first on Todd Walker's two-out home run off Tim Hudson, but in the third, Erubiel Durazo drove in two runs with a double off Pedro Martinez before Durazo himself scored on a single from Miguel Tejada, who was tagged out at second to end the inning. The Red Sox cut the Athletics' lead to 3–2 in the fifth on Jason Varitek's home run. In the seventh, Hudson allowed a two-out single to Nomar Garciaparra and was relieved by Ricardo Rincon, who allowed a home run to Walker to put the Red Sox up 4–3. In the ninth, Byung-hyun Kim walked Billy McMillon, then hit Chris Singleton with a pitch. After Mark Ellis struck out for the second out, Alan Embree relieved Kim and allowed a game-tying RBI single to Durazo, sending the game into extra innings. Oakland won it in the 12th when catcher Ramón Hernández laid down a two-out, bases-loaded bunt single off Derek Lowe, scoring Eric Chavez from third base. This was Oakland's ninth consecutive playoff win over Boston in the wake of ALCS sweeps in 1988 and 1990, breaking the record for consecutive playoff wins against one team set by the New York Yankees against the Chicago Cubs with World Series sweeps in 1932 and 1938. Incidentally, the Yankees nearly got a chance to extend that streak the same year.

=== Game 2 ===
October 2, 2003 1:06 pm (PDT) at Network Associates Coliseum in Oakland, California 59 °F (15 °C), overcast
Team	1	2	3	4	5	6	7	8	9	R	H	E
Boston	0	0	1	0	0	0	0	0	0	1	6	1
Oakland	0	5	0	0	0	0	0	0	X	5	6	0
WP: Barry Zito (1–0) LP: Tim Wakefield (0–1); Attendance: 36,305; Boxscore

The Athletics won Game 2 with a five-run outburst in the second inning off Tim Wakefield. Jose Guillen walked with one out, moved to second on a passed ball, and scored on Ramón Hernández's single. After Jermaine Dye was hit by a pitch, Eric Byrnes's double scored both runners. After a walk and ground out, Todd Walker's errant throw to first on Eric Chavez's ground ball scored two more runs. The Red Sox scored their only run of the game in the third on back-to-back doubles by Doug Mirabelli and Johnny Damon off Barry Zito. The Athletics were one win away from a trip to the ALCS.

=== Game 3 ===
October 4, 2003 7:36 pm (EDT) at Fenway Park in Boston, Massachusetts 60 °F (16 °C), cloudy
Team	1	2	3	4	5	6	7	8	9	10	11	R	H	E
Oakland	0	0	0	0	0	1	0	0	0	0	0	1	6	4
Boston	0	1	0	0	0	0	0	0	0	0	2	3	7	2
WP: Scott Williamson (1–0) LP: Rich Harden (1–1); Home runs: OAK: None; BOS: Trot Nixon (1); Attendance: 35,460; Boxscore

In Game 3, three errors in the second allowed the Red Sox to go up 1–0 on Damian Jackson's fielder's choice. The Athletics had a potential rally stifled by controversial outs. Eric Byrnes was tagged out after failing to touch home plate after a collision with catcher Jason Varitek. Miguel Tejada was similarly retired after being obstructed by Bill Mueller while rounding third base. Obstruction was called by umpire Tim Welke. However time was not called by the umpire and Tejada stopped running thus giving the Red Sox time to tag him. The one run scored in the inning sent the game into extra innings, where Boston won on a two-run walk-off home run by Trot Nixon off Rich Harden. This loss ended Oakland's playoff-record winning streak against the Red Sox at ten games, a record the Red Sox themselves would break in 2008 when they won their 11th consecutive playoff game against the Angels.

=== Game 4 ===
October 5, 2003 1:06 pm (EDT) at Fenway Park in Boston, Massachusetts 55 °F (13 °C), cloudy
Team	1	2	3	4	5	6	7	8	9	R	H	E
Oakland	0	1	0	0	0	3	0	0	0	4	11	1
Boston	0	0	2	0	0	1	0	2	X	5	7	0
WP: Scott Williamson (2–0) LP: Keith Foulke (0–1); Home runs: OAK: Jermaine Dye (1); BOS: Johnny Damon (1), Todd Walker (3); Attendance: 35,048; Boxscore

After Oakland starter Tim Hudson left with a strained left oblique after only one inning, the A's bullpen held the Sox to only three runs over the next seven innings. The Athletics went up 1–0 in the second on Jermaine Dye's bases loaded RBI single off John Burkett, but Johnny Damon's two-run home run after a walk in the third off Steve Sparks put the Red Sox up 2–1. In the sixth, Burkett allowed a leadoff single to Scott Hatteberg, who scored on Adam Melhuse's triple one out later, then Dye's home run put the Athletics up 4–2. Todd Walker's home run in the bottom of the inning off Ricardo Rincon cut the lead to 4–3. In the eighth, closer Keith Foulke allowed a one-out double to Nomar Garciaparra, then a two-out single to Manny Ramirez before both scored on David Ortiz's double. Scott Williamson earned the win with two shutout innings to close as the Red Sox's 5–4 win forced a Game 5 in Oakland.

=== Game 5 ===
October 6, 2003 5:18 pm (PDT) at Network Associates Coliseum in Oakland, California 69 °F (21 °C), sunny
Team	1	2	3	4	5	6	7	8	9	R	H	E
Boston	0	0	0	0	0	4	0	0	0	4	6	0
Oakland	0	0	0	1	0	1	0	1	0	3	7	0
WP: Pedro Martínez (1–0) LP: Barry Zito (1–1) Sv: Derek Lowe (1); Home runs: BOS: Jason Varitek (2), Manny Ramírez (1); OAK: None; Attendance: 49,397; Boxscore

The Athletics struck first in Game 5 in the fourth off Pedro Martinez when Scott Hatteberg walked with two outs and scored on Jose Guillen's double, but Jason Varitek's lead-off home run in the sixth tied the game off Barry Zito. Following a walk and hit-by-pitch, Manny Ramirez's three-run home run put the Red Sox up 4–1. The Athletics cut it to 4–2 in the bottom of the inning when Erubiel Durazo doubled with one out and scored on Miguel Tejada's double one out later. They cut it to 4–3 when Chris Singleton hit a leadoff double off Martinez and scored on Billy McMillon's single in the eighth. The A's loaded the bases on three walks in the ninth inning, but temporary closer Derek Lowe struck out Terrence Long looking to end the game. The win was marred by a violent collision between outfielder Johnny Damon and second baseman Damian Jackson. Damon was sent to the hospital where he was diagnosed with a concussion. Boston's victory secured their place in the American League Championship Series while Oakland lost the ALDS after being up two games to none for the second time in three years.

=== Composite box ===
2003 ALDS (3–2): Boston Red Sox over Oakland Athletics

Team	1	2	3	4	5	6	7	8	9	10	11	12	R	H	E
Boston Red Sox	1	1	3	0	1	5	2	2	0	0	2	0	17	38	5
Oakland Athletics	0	6	3	1	0	5	0	1	1	0	0	1	18	38	5
Total attendance: 206,816 Average attendance: 41,363
