= Greg Gibson (umpire) =

American baseball umpire (born 1968)

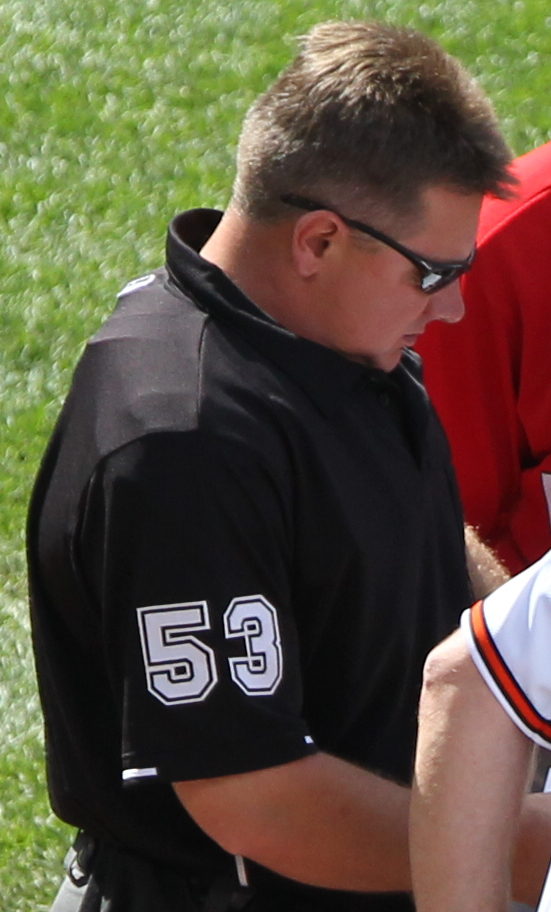
- Gibson in 2011
- Umpire
- Born: October 2, 1968 (age 56); Ironton, Ohio, U.S.

MLB debut
- June 14, 1997

Last MLB appearance
- May 30, 2022

Career highlights and awards
- Special assignments: World Series (2011); League Championship Series (2005, 2012, 2013, 2014, 2018); Division Series (2001, 2003, 2004, 2006, 2007, 2009, 2010, 2011, 2015, 2021); Wild Card Games (2012, 2013, 2018); All-Star Games (2008); World Baseball Classic (2009, 2013); Home plate umpire for Randy Johnson's perfect game (May 18, 2004)

Gregory Allan Gibson (born October 2, 1968) is an American former Major League Baseball umpire who worked in the National League from 1997 to 1999 and throughout both major leagues from 2000 to 2022. He was promoted to crew chief for the 2022 season.

== Umpiring career ==
Gibson has worked two Wild Card Games (2012, 2013), ten Division Series (2001, 2003, 2004, 2006, 2007, 2009, 2010, 2011, 2015, 2021), five National League Championship Series (2005, 2012, 2013, 2014, 2018), the 2011 World Series, and the 2008 All-Star Game. He has also officiated in two World Baseball Classics (2009, 2013).

Gibson was the home plate umpire for Randy Johnson's perfect game on May 18, 2004, as well as Tim Wakefield's 200th win. Before reaching the major leagues, he umpired in the Appalachian League (1991), Florida Instructional League (1991 and 1994), South Atlantic League (1992), Florida State League (1993), Eastern League (1994–1995) and International League (1996–1999).

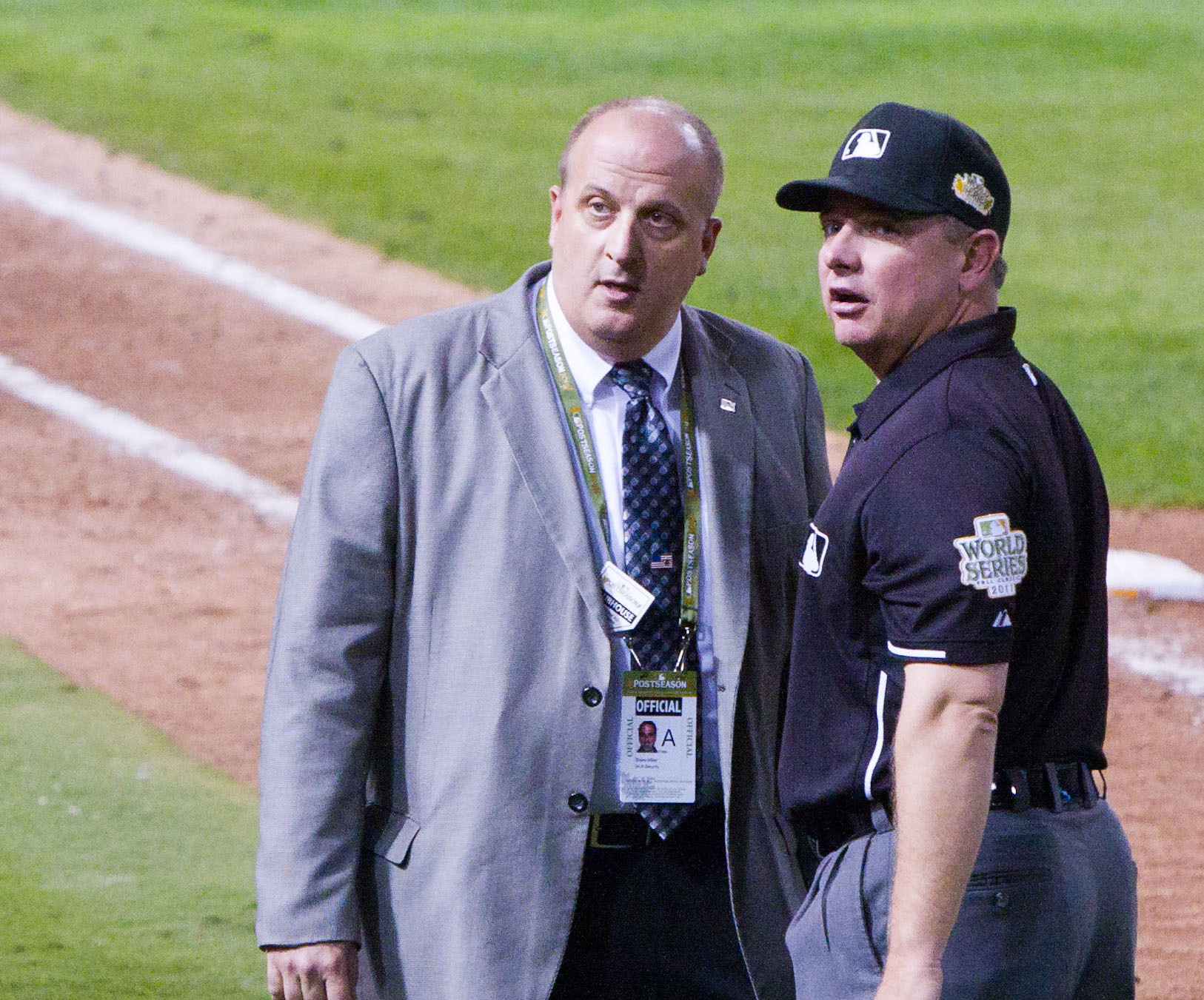
Gibson speaks with an MLB official requesting a fan's removal from World Series game

=== Controversy ===
During the 2005 NLCS, Gibson didn't see a ball hit off of Mark Grudzielanek's foot while he was still in the box, which would have been a foul ball. Instead, Grudzielanek grounded out to pitcher Roy Oswalt for the first out of the home half of second inning.

In the 2009 ALDS, Gibson was alleged to have ruled incorrectly on a baserunner coming into third base.

In the 12th inning of a game between the Minnesota Twins and the Kansas City Royals on April 24, 2010, Minnesota was leading 9–7 with two outs. Kansas City's Willie Bloomquist came to bat with baserunner Scott Podsednik on first base. Bloomquist hit a ground ball to shortstop J. J. Hardy, who mishandled it before throwing the ball to second base. Podsednik appeared to be safe, but Gibson, the second-base umpire, ruled him out to end the game and give the Twins a 9–7 win. Royals manager Trey Hillman unsuccessfully disputed the call.

On April 17, 2012, while serving as home plate umpire, Gibson made a series of calls in a game between the New York Yankees and Minnesota Twins that were not well received by fans, first calling a balk on pitcher Francisco Liriano, then tossing out Denard Span and team manager Ron Gardenhire for showing disapproval of Gibson's "strike" call at the beginning of the Span at-bat. Gibson's demeanor was reported by media as antagonistic as the fray began with Span, then remained aggressive as he tossed Gardenhire with great animation.

=== Injuries ===
On August 15, 2012, Gibson left a game between the Los Angeles Angels of Anaheim and the Cleveland Indians after he was slashed near the left eye by Torii Hunter during a play at the plate. Hunter's cleat kicked up after a hard slide to home plate and kicked Gibson. Gibson was not seriously injured. After his departure, minor league fill-in and first base umpire Manny Gonzalez assumed home plate umpiring duties as the crew worked in a three-person alignment for the remainder of the contest.

== Notable games ==
On September 3, 2008, Gibson was the home plate umpire for MLB's first use of instant replay.

Gibson was chosen as one of the umpires for the one-game Wild Card playoff between the Baltimore Orioles and the Texas Rangers on October 5, 2012.

Gibson was the home plate umpire for Game 6 of the National League Championship Series on October 18, 2013. At the start of the game, a "standoff" developed between Los Angeles Dodgers' first baseman Scott Van Slyke and St. Louis Cardinals' pitcher Joe Kelly. Both players remained on the field after the pregame ceremony, each waiting for the other to return to their respective dugout. Gibson ended the standoff by motioning both players back to their dugouts, with the Dodgers celebrating in their dugout after a Van Slyke victory. This incident was recorded in video form, and was used as an outro by the MLB's official YouTube channel for all videos posted in 2014. The outro has developed into an internet meme, and Gibson has become a well-known umpire thanks to this video clip.

On March 31, 2014, Gibson became the first umpire to have a call overturned via a manager's challenge during a regular season game. During the sixth inning, Atlanta Braves skipper Fredi González successfully contested Gibson's ruling that Milwaukee Brewers outfielder Ryan Braun was safe at first base.

On June 18, 2014, Gibson was the home plate umpire when Los Angeles Dodgers pitcher Clayton Kershaw no-hit the Colorado Rockies, 8–0.

On April 21, 2016, Gibson was the first base umpire when Chicago Cubs pitcher Jake Arrieta no hit the Cincinnati Reds, 16–0, his third career no hitter.

== See also ==
- List of Major League Baseball umpires (disambiguation)
