= Alex Prieto =

Venezuelan baseball player (born 1976)

- Infielder
- Born: June 19, 1976 (age 49); Caracas, Venezuela
- Batted: Right Threw: Right

MLB debut
- July 26, 2003, for the Minnesota Twins

Last appearance
- June 24, 2004, for the Minnesota Twins

MLB statistics
- Batting average: .209
- Home runs: 1
- Runs batted in: 4
- Stats at Baseball Reference

Teams
- Minnesota Twins (2003–2004)

Alejandro Antonio Prieto [pre-ay'-toh] (born June 19, 1976) is a Venezuelan former professional baseball infielder. He played in Major League Baseball (MLB) for the Minnesota Twins in part of two seasons spanning 2003–2004. Listed at 5' 10" [1.78 m], 200 lb. [91 k], Prieto batted and threw right-handed. He was born in Caracas.

== Career ==
Prieto was originally signed by the Kansas City Royals as an amateur free agent in 1992 and played in their Minor League system through 2002, when he joined the Twins organization until 2004. After that, he spent six seasons in the minors with several teams, including stints with the Royals, Phillies and Red Sox organizations, retiring in 2010.

Better known for his defensive abilities than for his bat, Prieto hit an average of .209 with one home run and four RBI in 24 games for the Orioles. His most productive season in the minors came in 2001, when he posted a .282/.344/.418 slash line with eight homers and 44 RBI for Triple–A Omaha Golden Spikes.

In between, Prieto played winter ball in the Venezuelan Professional Baseball League during 14 seasons between 1993 and 2009, collecting a .261 average with eight homers and 117 RBI in 482 game appearances.

Following his playing days, Prieto began his coaching career as an infield instructor and evaluator.

== See also ==
- List of Major League Baseball players from Venezuela

== Sources ==
- Career statistics from ESPN · Baseball Reference · Fangraphs · Baseball Reference (Minors) · Retrosheet · Baseball Almanac, or Retrosheet
