= Ron Gardenhire =

American baseball player and manager (born 1957)

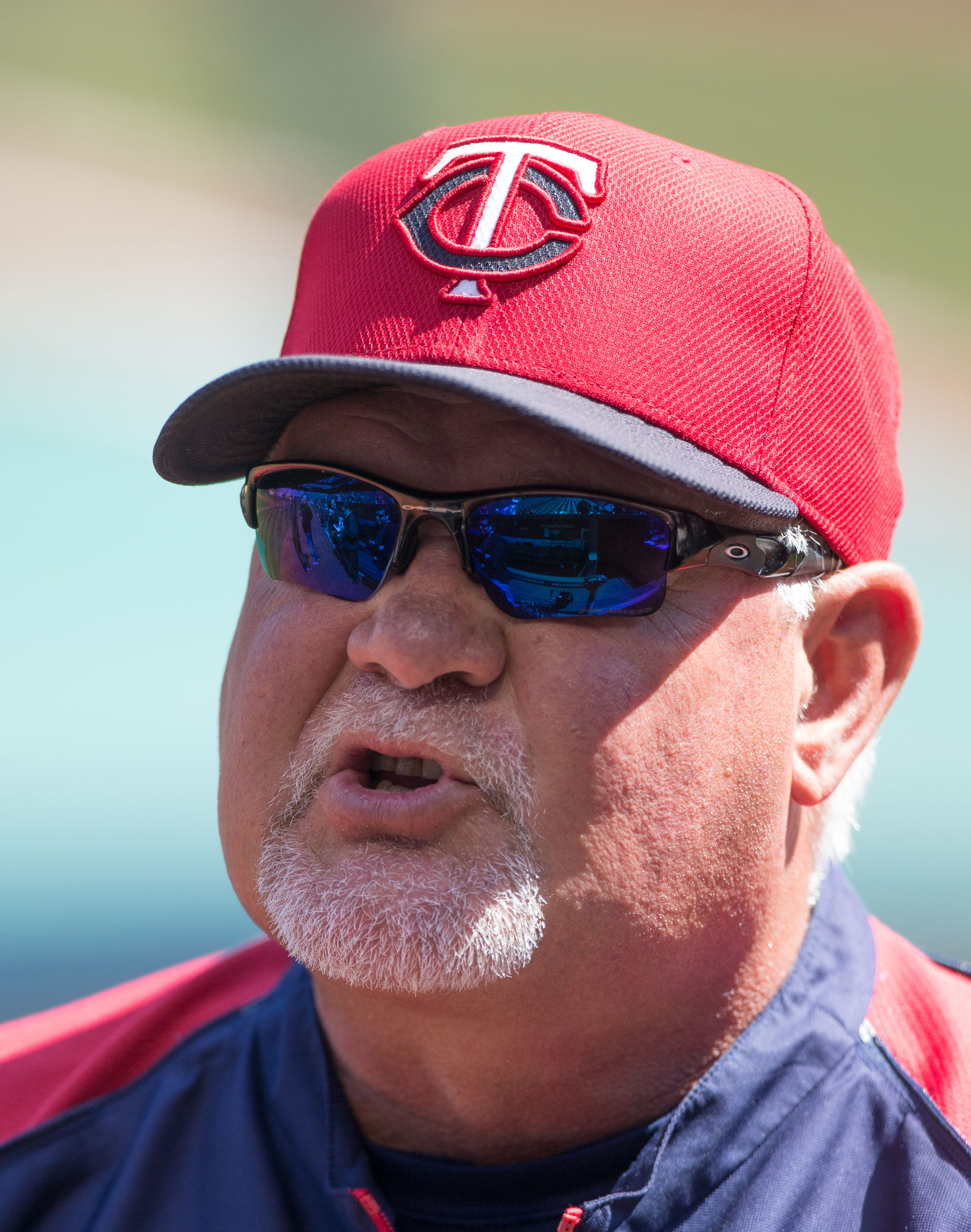
- Gardenhire with the Minnesota Twins, 2013
- Shortstop / Manager / Coach
- Born: October 24, 1957 (age 68); Butzbach, West Germany
- Batted: Right Threw: Right

MLB debut
- September 1, 1981, for the New York Mets

Last MLB appearance
- October 6, 1985, for the New York Mets

MLB statistics
- Batting average: .232
- Home runs: 4
- Runs batted in: 49
- Managerial record: 1,200–1,280
- Winning %: .484
- Stats at Baseball Reference
- Managerial record at Baseball Reference

Teams
- As player: New York Mets (1981–1985); As manager: Minnesota Twins (2002–2014); Detroit Tigers (2018–2020); As coach: Minnesota Twins (1991–2001); Arizona Diamondbacks (2017)

Career highlights and awards
- World Series champion (1991); AL Manager of the Year (2010); Minnesota Twins Hall of Fame

Ronald Clyde Gardenhire (born October 24, 1957) is an American former professional baseball player, coach, and manager. He played as a shortstop in Major League Baseball (MLB) for the New York Mets from 1981 to 1985. After another year playing in the minor leagues, he served as a manager in the Minnesota Twins farm system for three years, then as a coach for the Twins from 1991 to 2001, and then as the manager from 2002 to 2014, winning the American League Manager of the Year Award in 2010. He then coached for the Arizona Diamondbacks in 2017 and managed the Detroit Tigers from 2018 through most of 2020, when he retired from baseball.

== Early life ==
Ron Gardenhire was born to a military family at the U.S. Army base in Butzbach, West Germany. While growing up, he expected to join the military, but his passion for baseball was also encouraged by his father. The family later settled in Oklahoma where he attended Okmulgee High School.

== Amateur career ==
Gardenhire attended the University of Texas at Austin, where he played college baseball for the Texas Longhorns in 1978 and 1979 as a shortstop. In 1978 he set the school record for most RBIs in a single game (10) against Arkansas.

In 1979, he earned All-Southwest Conference honors and helped the Longhorns win the Southwest Conference Championship, the Southwest Conference Tournament Championship, the NCAA Central Regional Championship and go to the College World Series, where they finished in 4th. He was inducted into the Longhorn Hall of Honor in 2010.

== Professional career ==
The New York Mets selected Gardenhire in the sixth round, with the 132nd overall selection, of the 1979 Major League Baseball draft. He played for the Mets for five seasons, from 1981 to 1985. During his playing career, Gardenhire played shortstop, second base, and third base. He was plagued by injuries, especially to his hamstring. Only twice did he play in more than 70 games in a season, in 1982 and 1984. Following the 1986 season, he was traded to the Minnesota Twins, where he played one season for their Triple-A affiliate before retiring as a player.

Gardenhire stood six feet (183 cm) tall, and weighed 175 (79 kg) pounds during most of his baseball playing career.

== Managerial career ==
=== Minor leagues ===
For three years after he retired as a player (1988–90), Gardenhire was a manager in the Minnesota farm system, leading teams in the Class A Midwest League and Class AA Southern League to one second- and two first-place finishes. Gardenhire interviewed for the manager position of the San Francisco Giants in late 1993 and made the final round of finalists; the Giants hired Dusty Baker.

=== Minnesota Twins ===
On January 4, 2002, Gardenhire was named manager of the Twins, replacing Tom Kelly, who had won two World Series titles with the Twins. In contrast to Kelly's relatively calm, Bud Grant-like coaching style, Gardenhire was a very active and aggressive manager, frequently exiting the dugout to argue with umpires, leading some to joke that "Gardy" got ejected more times in a season than Kelly did in his entire career. In his 13 seasons managing the Twins, Gardenhire was ejected 73 times. An early 2006 television commercial for the Twins pokes fun at this, showing Gardenhire arguing with an office worker planning to go home after work rather than go to the Twins game.

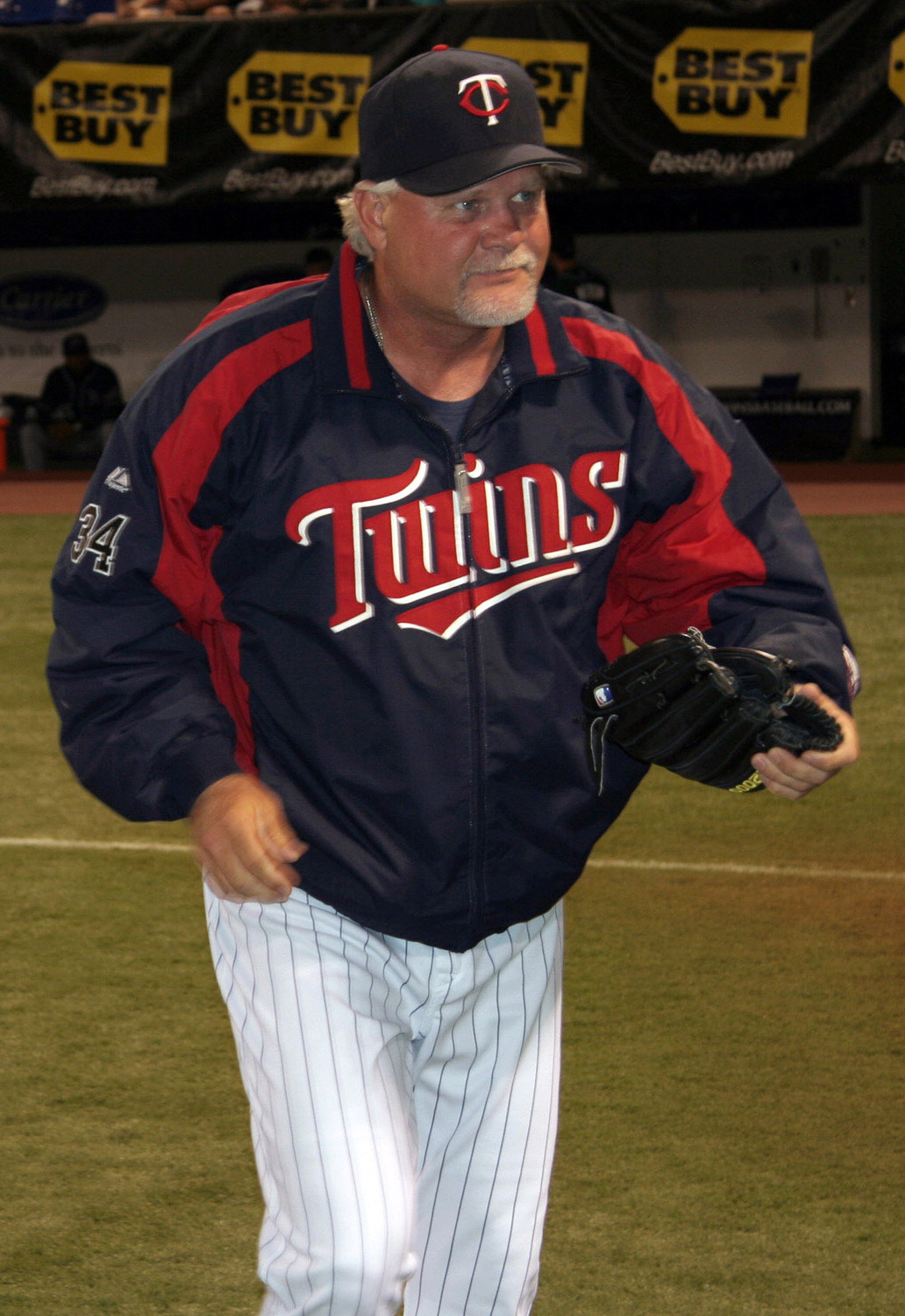
Gardenhire in 2006

Heading into Gardenhire's first season as team manager, the Twins had not been to the postseason since their World Series championship in 1991, and had barely escaped being dissolved entirely by a contraction plan that was aborted by a court ruling which bound the team to their lease with the Metrodome. Under Gardenhire, the Twins had a turnaround season in 2002 as they won the American League Central and made it to the 2002 American League Championship Series.

In thirteen seasons as the Twins' manager, Gardenhire's team had a losing record five times (2007, 2011, 2012, 2013 and 2014), and won the division six times (the Twins lost a one-game playoff to the Chicago White Sox to determine the division champion at the end of the 2008 season). Despite all of the team's regular season success under Gardenhire, the Twins advanced to the American League Championship Series only once – his first season, in 2002 – and did not reach the World Series. In Gardenhire's tenure as the manager of the Twins, the team posted a playoff record of 6 wins and 21 losses. He was the first manager in major league history to take a team to the playoffs six times in a tenure and never make it to the World Series (Bob Melvin joined him in 2020), and he is one of just five managers with at least four playoff appearances to never appear in one.

Gardenhire won the American League Manager of the Year Award in 2010 and finished as runner-up for the award in 2003, 2004, 2006, 2008, and 2009 while leading the Twins. He finished third in the voting in 2002, his first season as manager. Gardenhire's five runner-up finishes are tied with Tony La Russa, who won the award outright an additional four times. In 2009, he received the Chuck Tanner Major League Baseball Manager of the Year Award.

On November 13, 2008, Gardenhire signed a contract extension that kept him as the Twins' manager through the 2011 season. On November 18, 2010, the Twins announced a two-year contract extension through 2013. In October 2012, after two consecutive 90-plus loss seasons, Gardenhire was not given a contract extension past the 2013 season. On September 30, 2013, despite having another 90-plus loss season for the third year in a row, Gardenhire was given a two-year extension, through 2015. He had 998 career wins at the end of the 2013 season.

Gardenhire earned his 1,000th managerial victory on April 5, 2014 with a 7–3 victory over the Cleveland Indians at Progressive Field. He became the 60th manager in Major League history to top one thousand wins. Gardenhire is only the tenth manager to accomplish this feat with only one team, joining the Twins' previous manager, Tom Kelly, on that list.

On September 29, 2014, Gardenhire was fired after 13 seasons as Twins manager and 27 years in the Twins organization. The last four years of Gardenhire's tenure were the worst in Twins' history. This included 383 losses and a record of 78–148 from August 1 to the end of the season. His overall regular season record was 1,068–1,039 and his playoff record was 6–21.

Gardenhire was inducted into the Twins Hall of Fame in 2022.

=== Detroit Tigers ===
On October 20, 2017, it was announced that Gardenhire had signed a three-year contract to take the helm of the Detroit Tigers beginning in the 2018 season. He succeeded Brad Ausmus, who posted a 314–332 record in four seasons.

In his first game as the Tigers' manager, Gardenhire was ejected after what initially appeared to be a walk-off win in the 10th inning over the Pittsburgh Pirates was overturned on video review. The Tigers lost the game to the Pirates, 13–10, in 13 innings.

On September 19, 2020, Gardenhire announced his retirement as a manager due to health concerns.

=== Managerial record ===
Team	Year	Regular season					Postseason			
Team	Year	Games	Won	Lost	Win %	Finish	Won	Lost	Win %	Result
MIN	2002	161	94	67	.584	1st in AL Central	4	6	.400	Lost ALCS (ANA)
MIN	2003	162	90	72	.556	1st in AL Central	1	3	.250	Lost ALDS (NYY)
MIN	2004	162	92	70	.568	1st in AL Central	1	3	.250	Lost ALDS (NYY)
MIN	2005	162	83	79	.512	3rd in AL Central	–	–	–	
MIN	2006	162	96	66	.593	1st in AL Central	0	3	.000	Lost ALDS (OAK)
MIN	2007	162	79	83	.488	3rd in AL Central	–	–	–	
MIN	2008	163	88	75	.540	2nd in AL Central	–	–	–	
MIN	2009	163	87	76	.534	1st in AL Central	0	3	.000	Lost ALDS (NYY)
MIN	2010	162	94	68	.580	1st in AL Central	0	3	.000	Lost ALDS (NYY)
MIN	2011	162	63	99	.389	5th in AL Central	–	–	–	
MIN	2012	162	66	96	.407	5th in AL Central	–	–	–	
MIN	2013	162	66	96	.407	4th in AL Central	–	–	–	
MIN	2014	162	70	92	.432	5th in AL Central	–	–	–	
MIN total		2107	1068	1039	.507		6	21	.222	
DET	2018	162	64	98	.395	3rd in AL Central	–	–	–	
DET	2019	161	47	114	.292	5th in AL Central	–	–	–	
DET	2020	50	21	29	.420	Retired	–	–	–	
DET total		373	132	241	.354		0	0	–	
Total		2480	1200	1280	.484		6	21	.222	

== Coaching career ==
In 1991, Gardenhire became the Twins' third base coach and held that post for 11 full seasons, including the team's 1991 World Series championship.

In November 2016, Gardenhire was hired as the bench coach of the Arizona Diamondbacks. However, after the first seven games of the season, he left the team on a leave of absence for prostate cancer surgery. He was replaced by Jerry Narron, who took over as interim bench coach. After a five-week absence, Gardenhire rejoined the Diamondbacks in May.

== Personal life ==
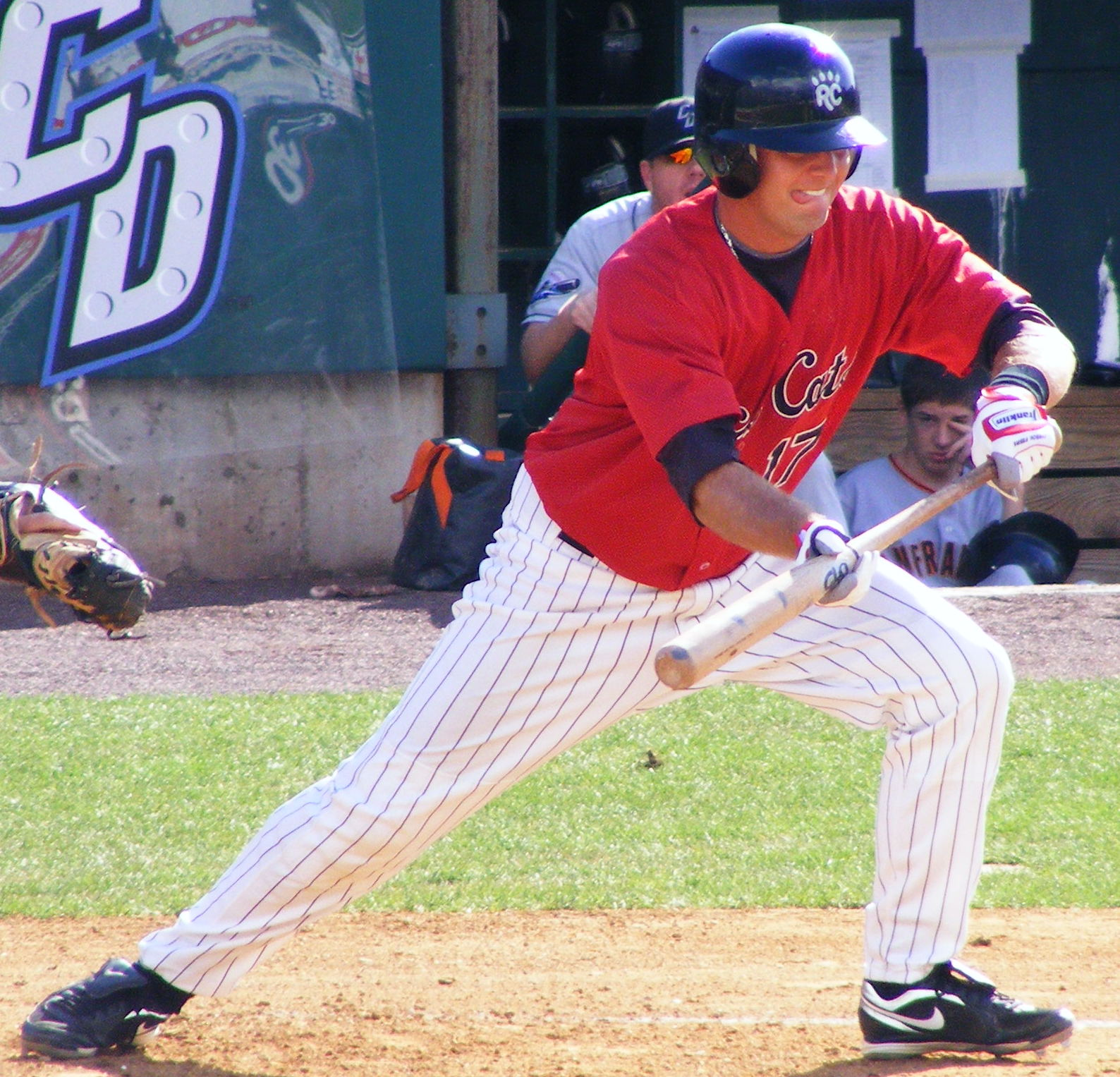
Toby Gardenhire with the New Britain Rock Cats in 2009

Gardenhire is married to Carol (née Kissling). The Gardenhires have three children: son Toby Gardenhire, and daughters Tiffany and Tara. Toby played and coached minor league baseball with the Twins organization.

== See also ==
- List of Major League Baseball managers with most career ejections
- List of Major League Baseball managers with most career wins
- List of Major League Baseball players from Europe

Sporting positions
Preceded by Rick Renick	Minnesota Twins third base coach 1991–1994	Succeeded by Scott Ullger
Preceded by ???	Minnesota Twins bench coach 1995	Succeeded by ???
Preceded by Jerry White	Minnesota Twins first base coach 1996–1998	Succeeded by Jerry White
Preceded by Scott Ullger	Minnesota Twins third base coach 1999–2002	Succeeded by Al Newman
Preceded by Glenn Sherlock	Arizona Diamondbacks bench coach 2017	Succeeded by Jerry Narron
