= David Lamb (baseball) =

American baseball player (born 1975)

- Infielder
- Born: June 6, 1975 (age 51); West Hills, California, U.S.
- Batted: Switch Threw: Right

MLB debut
- April 12, 1999, for the Tampa Bay Devil Rays

Last MLB appearance
- September 29, 2002, for the Minnesota Twins

MLB statistics
- Batting average: .216
- Home runs: 1
- Runs batted in: 13
- Stats at Baseball Reference

Teams
- Tampa Bay Devil Rays (1999); New York Mets (2000); Minnesota Twins (2002)

David Christian Lamb (born June 6, 1975) is an American former professional baseball infielder. He played three seasons in Major League Baseball (MLB) for the Tampa Bay Devil Rays, New York Mets and Minnesota Twins.
