= Michael Restovich =

American baseball player (born 1979)

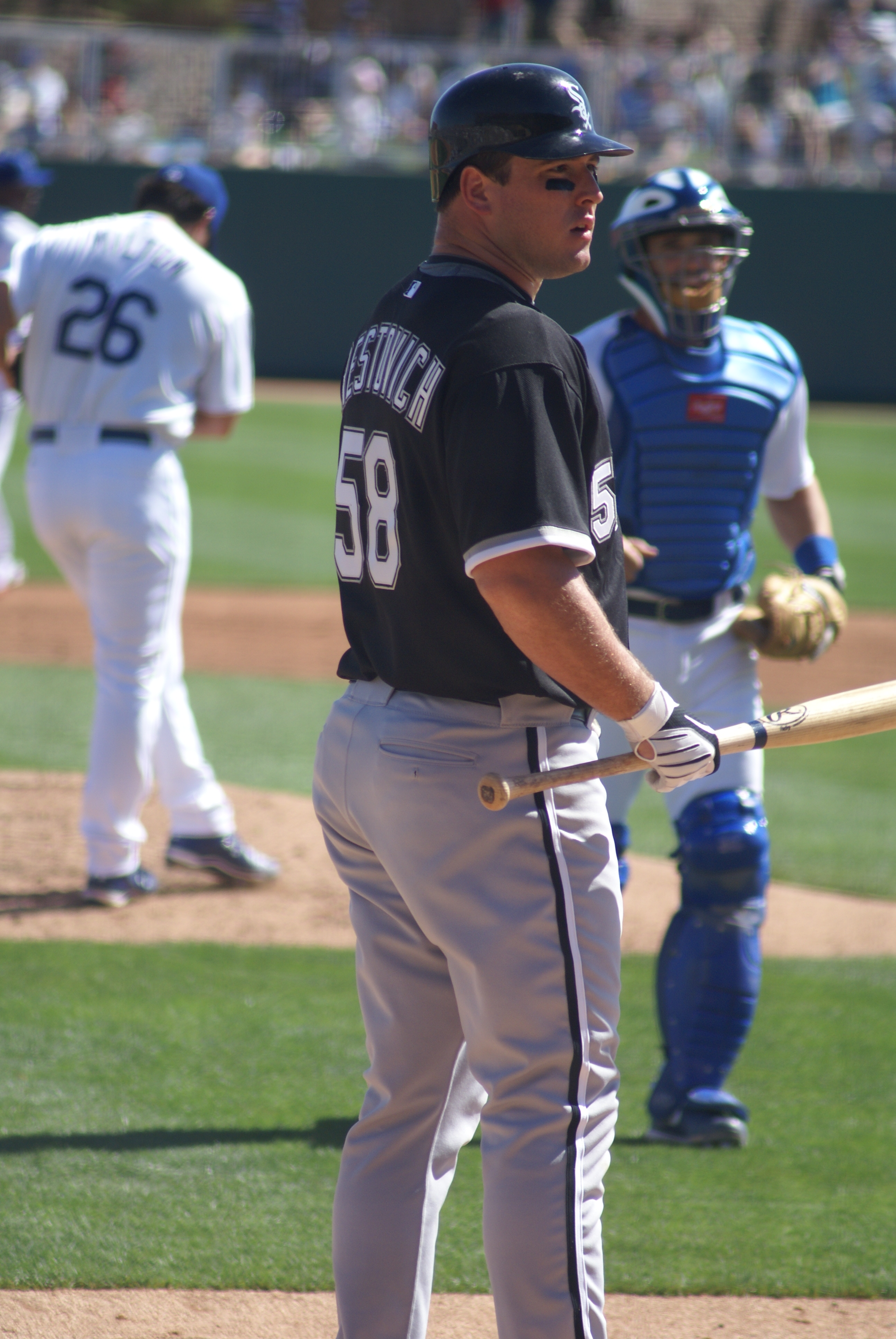
- Restovich with the Chicago White Sox during spring training in 2009.
- Outfielder
- Born: January 3, 1979 (age 47); Rochester, Minnesota, U.S.
- Batted: Right Threw: Right

Professional debut
- MLB: September 18, 2002, for the Minnesota Twins
- NPB: March 20, 2008, for the Fukuoka SoftBank Hawks

Last appearance
- MLB: May 5, 2007, for the Washington Nationals
- NPB: September 15, 2008, for the Fukuoka SoftBank Hawks

MLB statistics
- Batting average: .239
- Home runs: 6
- Runs batted in: 21

NPB statistics
- Batting average: .223
- Home runs: 3
- Runs batted in: 17
- Stats at Baseball Reference

Teams
- Minnesota Twins (2002–2004); Colorado Rockies (2005); Pittsburgh Pirates (2005); Chicago Cubs (2006); Washington Nationals (2007); Fukuoka SoftBank Hawks (2008)

Michael Jerome Restovich (born January 3, 1979) is an American-Serbian former professional baseball first baseman and outfielder.

== High school career ==
Restovich attended Mayo High School in Rochester, Minnesota, where after his senior season in 1997 he was named player of the year for the state of Minnesota, and also made the All-American team.

== Professional career ==
=== Minnesota Twins ===
The Minnesota Twins selected Restovich in the second round of the 1997 MLB draft. In 1998, he played for the Rookie-Class Elizabethton Twins.

=== Chicago White Sox ===
In January 2009, he signed a minor league contract with the Chicago White Sox with an invitation to spring training.

=== Los Angeles Dodgers ===
On January 8, 2010, Restovich signed a minor league deal with the Los Angeles Dodgers with an invite to spring training.
