= Brad Radke =

American baseball player (born 1972)

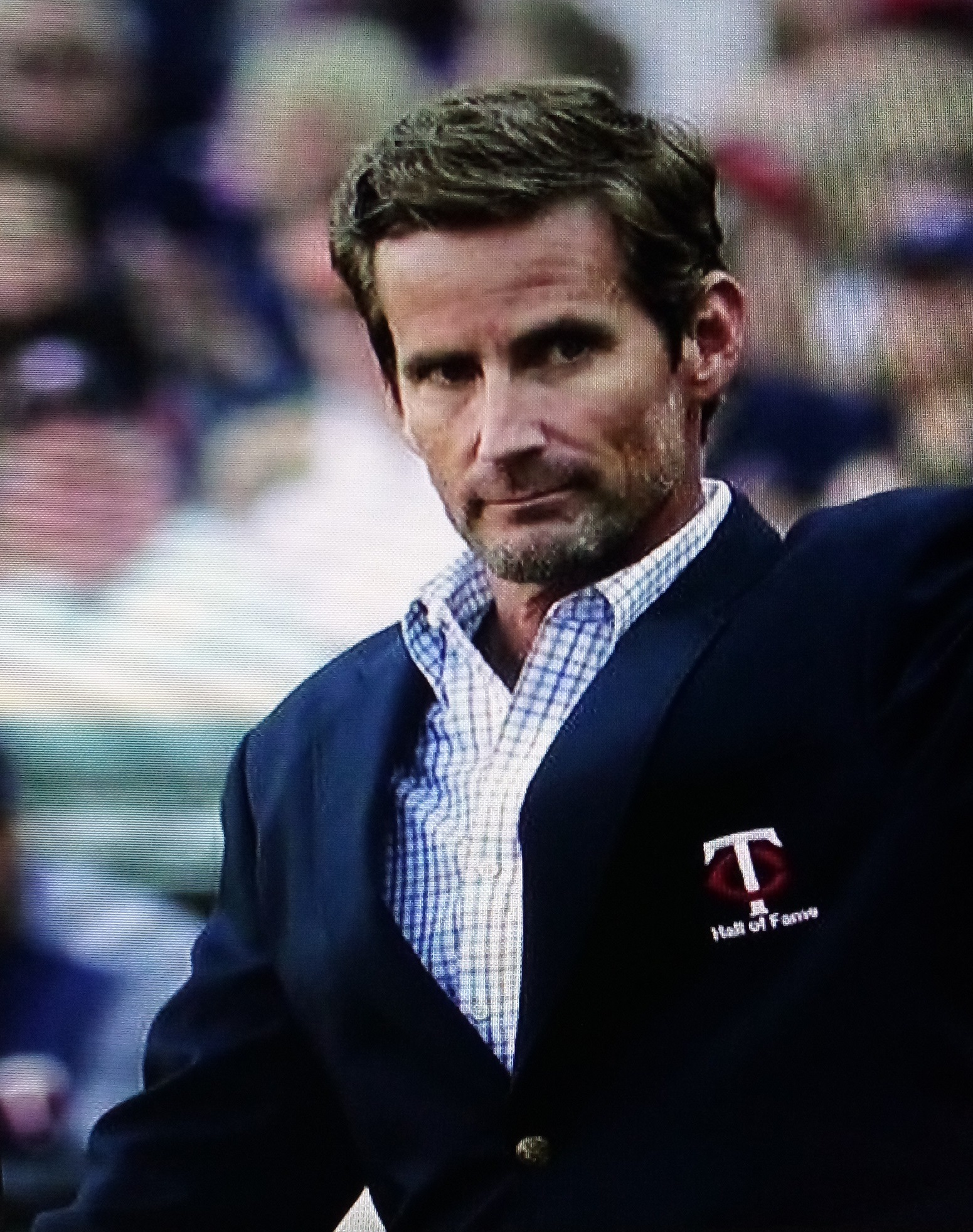
- Radke in 2010
- Pitcher
- Born: October 27, 1972 (age 52); Eau Claire, Wisconsin, U.S.
- Batted: Right Threw: Right

MLB debut
- April 29, 1995, for the Minnesota Twins

Last MLB appearance
- October 6, 2006, for the Minnesota Twins

MLB statistics
- Win–loss record: 148–139
- Earned run average: 4.22
- Strikeouts: 1,467
- Stats at Baseball Reference

Teams
- Minnesota Twins (1995–2006)

Career highlights and awards
- All-Star (1998); Minnesota Twins Hall of Fame

Brad William Radke (born October 27, 1972) is an American former professional baseball pitcher who played his entire 12-season career with the Minnesota Twins of Major League Baseball (MLB). Radke won 148 career games and was one of the most consistent pitchers in the Twins organization during the late 1990s.

== Early life ==
Radke was born in Eau Claire, Wisconsin and graduated from Jesuit High School of Tampa where he set a single-season school record with a 0.31 earned run average. He also played for the school's basketball team. He accepted a scholarship to play college baseball at South Florida.

== Playing career ==
Radke was not considered a top prospect before the Minnesota Twins drafted him in the 8th round of the 1991 Major League Baseball draft.

In his debut season (1995), he finished 11–14 with a 5.32 ERA. In 1997, he finished an excellent season with a 20–10 record and a 3.87 ERA in 239 innings. During the year, he earned a win 12 consecutive starts, becoming only the third player since 1950 (along with Bob Gibson and Pat Dobson) to accomplish the feat. He finished third in American League Cy Young Award voting.

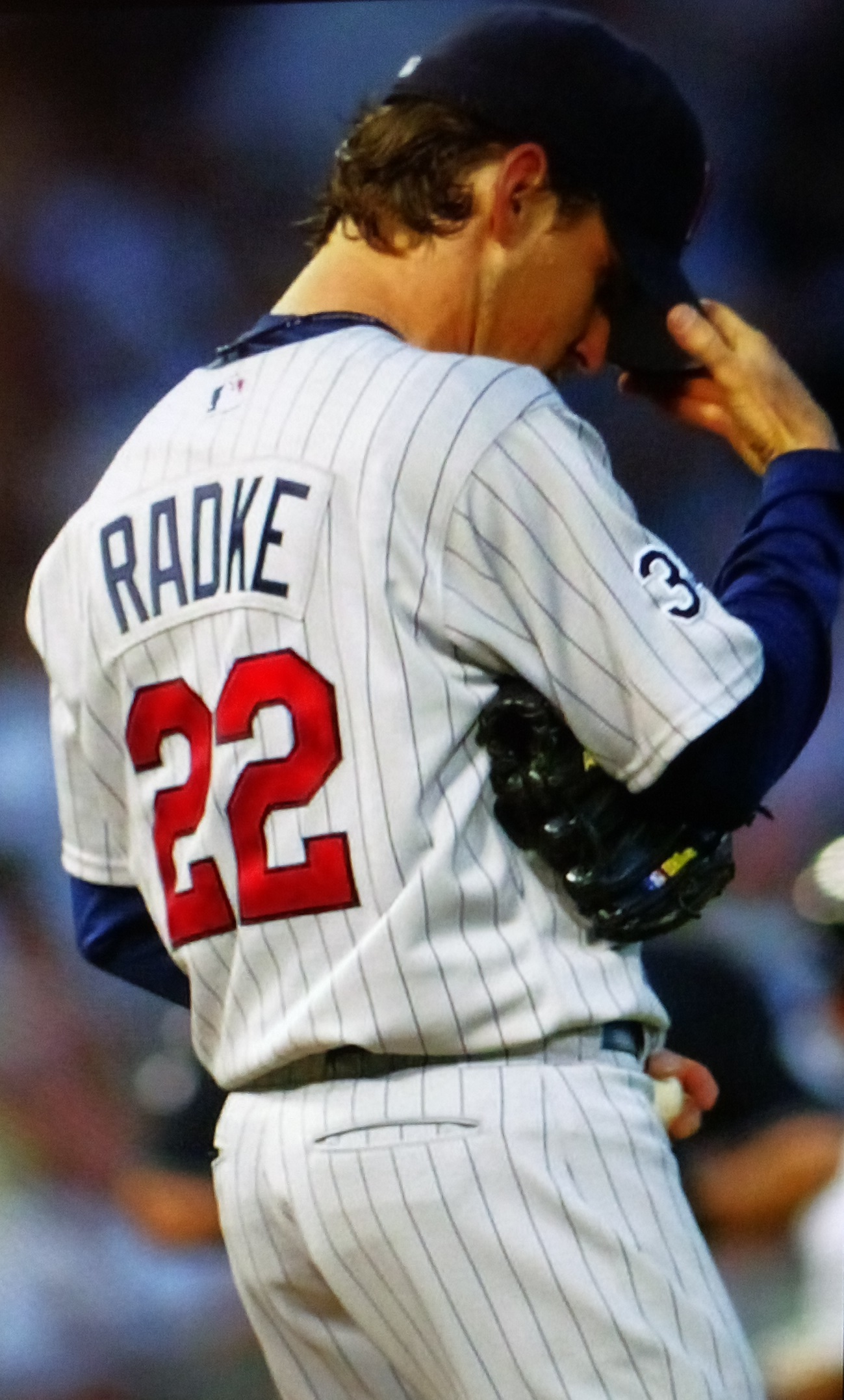
Radke with the Twins in 2006

From 1998 to 2001, Radke averaged 12 wins and 32 starts each season. He pitched over 210 innings each season.

In 2002, for the first time in his big league career, he failed to pitch in 30 games and fell one win short from finishing with 10 wins for the eighth consecutive season. His ERA was 4.72, the first time since his rookie season that he had recorded an ERA above 4.50. In 2003 and 2004, Radke came back to form, notching 14 and 11 wins respectively.

Radke was known for being one of the best control pitchers of the modern era, walking an average of only 41 batters a year, in an average of 34 games a year. He was, however, also known for giving up home runs, yielding as many as 40 in a single season.Radke's susceptibility to home runs was lampooned in a commercial for Sega Sports' World Series Baseball II in 1995, and featured Radke watching as home runs sailed out of the park. In addition to home runs, Radke was often plagued by first-inning troubles. Radke allowed 76 home runs and a .285/.324/.508 slash line in the first inning. Radke's first inning issues led to a career 5.05 ERA in the frame, well over his career mark of 4.22.

Radke had hinted that he might retire following the 2006 season, citing a torn labrum (which he had been pitching through during the season). A stress fracture in his shoulder suffered in late August sidelined him as of September 2. On September 12, he threw catch from a distance of 110 feet (34 m) (slightly less than twice the distance from the pitcher's mound to home plate) without pain, an important step in the way to his return for the last week or two of the season and the Twins' playoff drive, and even more important with Francisco Liriano's season appearing to be over with the reappearance of pain in his left elbow on September 13. On September 28, Radke returned to action, pitching five innings and surrendering one unearned run, earning no decision in a 2–1 Twins victory over the Kansas City Royals. It was Radke's last regular season start. He finished the season with a 12–9 record in 28 starts. In his last major league appearance, he pitched in the third game of the American League Division Series against the Oakland Athletics, giving up four runs on two two-run home runs in four innings. He announced his retirement from baseball on December 19, 2006. At the time of his retirement, Radke ranked second in franchise history in starts (377) and third in wins (148), innings pitched (2,451) and strikeouts (1,467).

On July 11, 2009, Radke was inducted into the Minnesota Twins Hall of Fame. On April 12, 2010, Radke was selected to raise one of the Twins pennant flags in left field at Target Field.

=== Batting ===
Being in the AL, interleague play forced him to bat 29 times. He had 3 hits, a .103 batting average. He had no walks, but 5 sacrifice hits.

=== Postseason ===
Radke made his first of back-to-back-to-back postseason appearances in 2002. His postseason performance was solid, with an overall 3.19 ERA in 31 innings pitched and a 2–3 record.

His best postseason series was his first, against the Oakland Athletics. He started two games out of the five, winning both with a 1.54 ERA. Radke only gave up one run in the deciding game of the series before the 5–1 Twins lead was almost squandered in the ninth inning, when Eddie Guardado gave up three runs. But the Twins won 5–4 and advanced to the American League Championship Series. Radke lost the only game he pitched in that series against the Angels, but he shut them out for the first six innings of that game. In the end, the Twins lost the game 7–1 and the series 4–1.

== Personal life ==
In 2002, Radke and his wife, Heather, announced the formation of a charity, the Brad and Heather Radke Family Foundation, which would support the Hennepin County Medical Center.

Radke's son, Kasey, pitched for the University of Tampa and his son, Ryan, played basketball for Radke's alma mater, Jesuit High School.

In 2011, Radke sold his Greenwood, Minnesota home for $2.4 million (equivalent to $3.4 million in 2024).

== Career accomplishments ==
- All-Star (1998)
- Led American League (AL) in strikeout-to-walk ratio (2001)
- 7th in AL in strikeouts (1997)
- Second in MLB in complete games with 6, tied with Mark Mulder and Curt Schilling, behind Steve Sparks (2001)
- Finished third in AL Cy Young Award balloting in 1997, behind Roger Clemens and Randy Johnson.
- Ranks #58th all time in strikeout-to-walk ratio
- Ranks #33 in lowest walks per nine innings pitched (1.681)

== See also ==
- List of Major League Baseball players who spent their entire career with one franchise
