= Bobby Kielty =

American baseball player (born 1976)

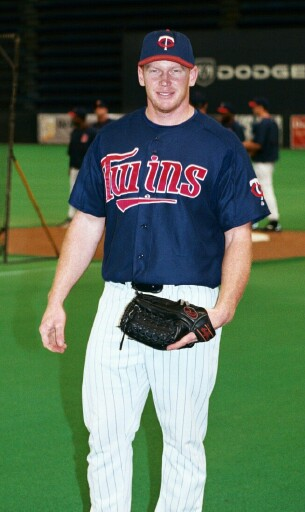
- Kielty with the Minnesota Twins in 2002
- Outfielder
- Born: August 5, 1976 (age 49); Fontana, California, U.S.
- Batted: Switch Threw: Right

MLB debut
- April 10, 2001, for the Minnesota Twins

Last MLB appearance
- October 28, 2007, for the Boston Red Sox

MLB statistics
- Batting average: .254
- Home runs: 53
- Runs batted in: 253
- Stats at Baseball Reference

Teams
- Minnesota Twins (2001–2003); Toronto Blue Jays (2003); Oakland Athletics (2004–2007); Boston Red Sox (2007)

Career highlights and awards
- World Series champion (2007)

Robert Michael Kielty (born August 5, 1976) is an American former professional baseball outfielder. He played for the Minnesota Twins, Toronto Blue Jays, Oakland Athletics, and Boston Red Sox during a Major League Baseball (MLB) career that lasted from 2001 to 2007. In his final MLB season, Kielty won the 2007 World Series over the Colorado Rockies as a member of the Red Sox.

== College (1994–98) ==
Kielty graduated from Canyon Springs High School (Moreno Valley, California) in 1994. After high school, he attended the University of Southern California from 1994 to 1995, Riverside City College from 1996 to 1997, and the University of Mississippi from 1997 to 1998. In summer 1996, Kielty played collegiate summer baseball for the Kenosha Kroakers of the Northwoods League. In 1998, he played for the Brewster Whitecaps of the Cape Cod Baseball League (CCBL). He was named league MVP after leading the league in batting average (.384) and RBI (45). Kielty was inducted into the CCBL Hall of Fame in 2005. Kielty was also named 1998 Summer Player of the Year by Baseball America. In 1999, he was signed by the Minnesota Twins as an amateur free agent.

== Professional career (1999–2011) ==
=== Minnesota Twins (1999–2003) ===
In 1999, Kielty began his minor league career with the Quad City River Bandits of the Midwest League. An eye problem forced him to miss more than a month of action (May 21-June 24), and he was disabled with a strained right hamstring (August 25-September 3). In only 69 games, Kielty batted .294 with 13 HR and 43 RBI and 12 SB. He homered in 3 consecutive games from August 14–16.

Kielty was promoted to the New Britain Rock Cats of the Eastern League in 2000. He hit a grand slam against Portland on April 8, and another against Erie on May 26. He played in the Eastern League all-star game held in Bowie, Maryland. Kielty led the team in home runs (14), was second in RBI (65) and third in hits (118). His 98 walks led the league. He also had a .262 batting average for the season. On August 26, Kielty was promoted to the Salt Lake Stingers of the Pacific Coast League, where he played in only nine games, and hit .242 with 2 RBI.

Kielty then began the 2001 season with the Twins' newly relocated Pacific Coast League team in Edmonton with the Edmonton Trappers. Then in early April, the Minnesota Twins purchased his contract and Kielty made his Major League debut on April 10 against the Detroit Tigers. The Twins optioned Kielty back down to Edmonton on April 21, but was recalled by the team on July 31. Kielty was demoted to Edmonton again on August 17, but then returned to the Twins on September 3 and played in 28 of the Twins' last 37 games. Overall with Edmonton, he finished with a .287 average, 12 HR and 50 RBI, while with Minnesota he hit .250 with 2 HR and 14 RBI.

Kielty once again started the 2002 season in Edmonton, but only appeared in two games before the Twins called him up. Kielty made his post-season debut against the Oakland Athletics in the ALDS, going 0 for 4 in the series. He then went 0 for 3 with a walk and RBI in the ALCS against the Anaheim Angels. After the season, he won the Bill Boni Award as the Twins' most outstanding rookie, and he finished fourth in the American League for AL Rookie of the Year. Kielty finished the year with a .291 average, 12 HR and 46 RBI in 112 games.

After the Twins traded right fielder Matt Lawton to the New York Mets midway through the 2001 season, the team frequently used a platoon of Kielty and Dustan Mohr in right field. Twins fans were so accustomed to seeing one or the other player in right field that broadcasters Bert Blyleven and Dick Bremer dubbed the duo "Dusty Kielmohr". This situation persisted until midway through the 2003 season.

Kielty began the 2003 season with a 12-game hitting streak with the Twins, and had his first career two-homer game on April 17 against Detroit. He was traded mid-season to the Toronto Blue Jays.

=== Toronto Blue Jays (2003) ===
On July 16, Minnesota traded Kielty to the Toronto Blue Jays for left fielder Shannon Stewart. He made his Blue Jays debut the next day against the Boston Red Sox, going 3 for 4 with a home run and 3 RBI. Kielty's stats were .244, 13 HR and 57 RBI. In the off-season, the Blue Jays traded Kielty to the Oakland Athletics for starting pitcher Ted Lilly in a move that had been pre-planned by the two management groups as Athletics GM Billy Beane was a fan of Kielty's.

=== Oakland Athletics (2004–07) ===
Kielty was the Athletics' Opening Day left fielder in 2004, and through May 19, he was hitting .250 with 4 HR and 14 RBI. After that, he hit .190 with 3 HR and 17 RBI for the rest of the season, ending up with a .214 average, 7 HR and 31 RBI.

Kielty rebounded in 2005 by hitting .263 with 10 HR and tied his career high with 57 RBI. Kielty missed 3 weeks in September due to an oblique muscle injury.

In the 2005 season, Kielty, along with other members of the team, grew out his hair and refused to cut it. He earned the nickname "Ronny Mac" due to his similarity to McDonald's mascot, Ronald McDonald.

Kielty cut his hair in the 2005 off-season, and began the 2006 season with the Athletics Triple A affiliate, the Sacramento River Cats. He spent 10 games there, batting .222 with 1 HR and 4 RBI before being recalled by the A's. With Oakland, he managed to play in 81 games, hitting .270 with 8 HR and 36 RBI, helping the club make the playoffs. Kielty did not appear in the Athletics series against the Minnesota Twins, in which the A's swept Minnesota, and he saw very limited action in the ALCS against the Detroit Tigers, as he went hitless in 2 at bats, as Oakland was swept.

Kielty returned to Oakland for the 2007 season, however, he ran into injury problems, and played in just 13 games, hitting .200 with 0 HR and 3 RBI. On July 23, 2007, Kielty was designated for assignment by the Athletics to make room for closer Huston Street. He was released a week later.

=== Boston Red Sox (2007) ===
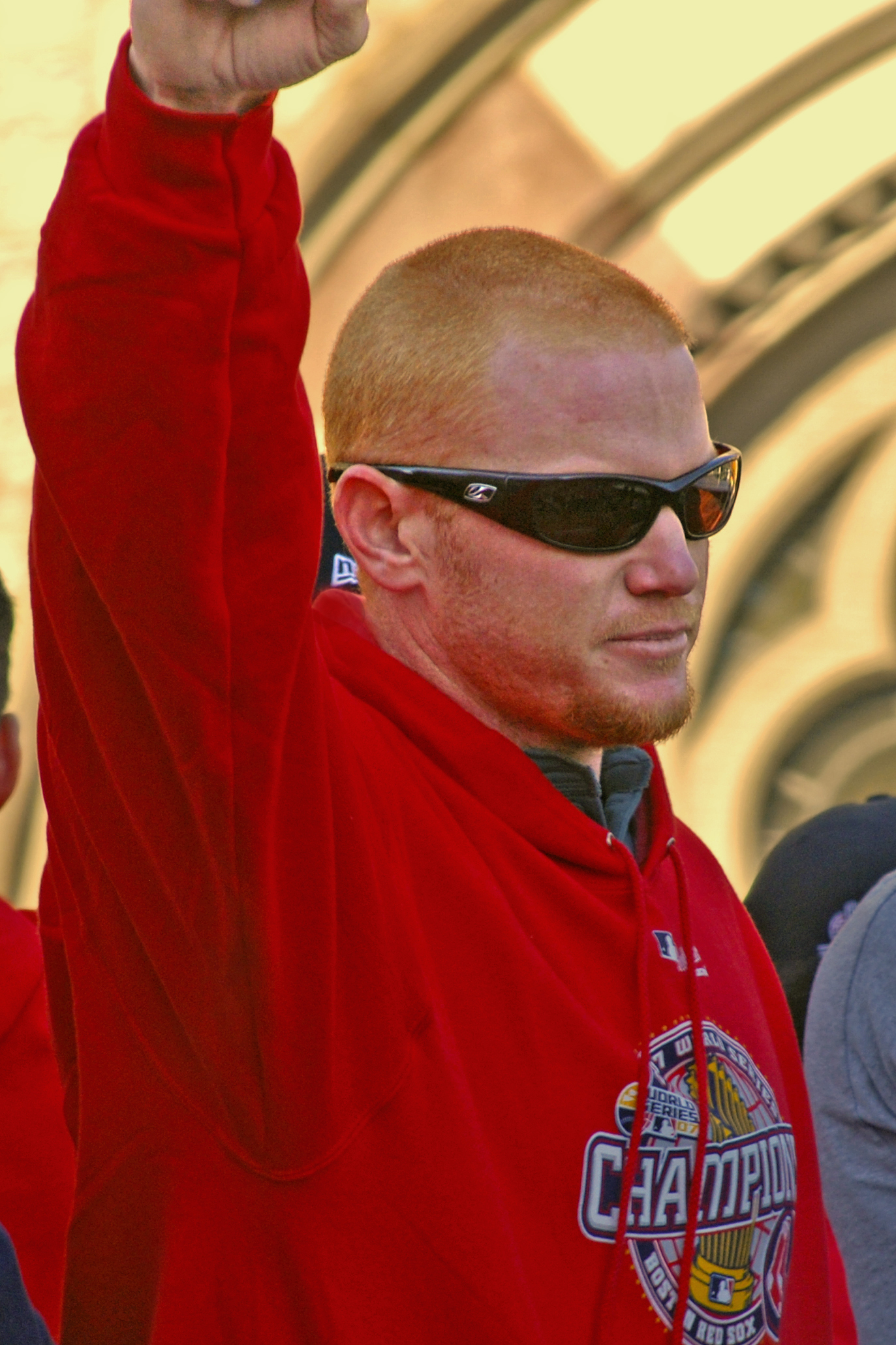
Kielty at the Red Sox world series champion parade.

On August 6, the Boston Red Sox signed Kielty to a minor-league deal, setting up his potential promotion as a fourth outfielder. On August 18, the Red Sox called Kielty up from Triple-A Pawtucket, following the trade of Wily Mo Peña to the Washington Nationals. He hit .237 with 2 HR and 5 RBI in 10 games with Pawtucket.

With Boston, Kielty saw limited action as the 4th outfielder, appearing in 20 games, hitting .231 with 1 HR and 9 RBI. He saw no action in the Red Sox playoff series against the Los Angeles Angels of Anaheim, which the Red Sox swept. In the ALCS against the Cleveland Indians, Kielty played in games 1 and 5 due to his past success against Cleveland starter CC Sabathia, hitting .400 with 2 RBI, and helping the team advance to the World Series.

On October 28, in his only World Series at bat and on the first pitch, Kielty hit a pinch-hit solo home run in Game 4 of the 2007 World Series, which turned out to be the series-clinching game winner in the 4–3 final over the Colorado Rockies. He is the 21st player to hit a pinch-hit home run in the World Series. The at-bat would turn out to be Kielty's final appearance in a major league game.

On February 6, 2008, the Red Sox re-signed Kielty to a one-year non-guaranteed deal. On March 31, 2008, Kielty accepted an assignment to the Pawtucket Red Sox rather than opt for free agency. On April 25, Kielty had surgery on his left hand that would require an absence of 4 to 6 weeks. Kielty asked for and was granted his release from the Red Sox organization on July 13, 2008.

=== Second stint with Twins (2008) ===
Kielty re-entered the Twins system when he signed a minor league contract on August 11, 2008. He was assigned to the Rochester Red Wings, the Twins' Triple-A affiliate, and played three weeks with the ballclub. When the major league rosters expanded on September 1, Kielty was not among those called up to Minnesota. Since Kielty's contract had a clause that allowed him to leave the organization if he was not called up to the Twins, Kielty was granted his release from the Twins system prior to the Red Wings' final game of the season on September 1.

=== New York Mets (2009) ===
In January 2009, Kielty signed a minor league contract with the New York Mets. He was released on June 22.

=== San Diego Padres (2011) ===
On February 3, 2011, Kielty signed a minor league contract with the San Diego Padres.

=== York Revolution ===
On May 22, 2012, Kielty signed with the York Revolution of the Atlantic League of Professional Baseball. In 19 games he struggled hitting .221/.329/.382 with 3 home runs and 8 RBIs.

=== Lancaster Barnstormers ===
On April 12, 2014, Kielty signed with the Lancaster Barnstormers of the Atlantic League of Professional Baseball. In 9 games he went 9-35 (.257) with 1 home run and 9 RBIs.

=== Coaching career ===
In 2025 Bobby Kielty was named the coach of the Men's Tennis team at University of California, Riverside (UCR)
