= José Rodríguez (pitcher, born 1974) =

Puerto Rican baseball player

- Pitcher
- Born: December 18, 1974 (age 51); Cayey, Puerto Rico
- Batted: Left Threw: Left

MLB debut
- May 18, 2000, for the St. Louis Cardinals

Last MLB appearance
- July 13, 2002, for the Minnesota Twins

MLB statistics
- Win–loss record: 0–1
- Earned run average: 9.00
- Strikeouts: 3

CPBL statistics
- Win–loss record: 1–1
- Earned run average: 6.28
- Strikeouts: 8
- Stats at Baseball Reference

Teams
- St. Louis Cardinals (2000, 2002); Minnesota Twins (2002); Macoto Cobras (2007)

José Ilich Rodríguez (born December 18, 1974) is a Puerto Rican former professional baseball pitcher. Rodríguez pitched 12 games in Major League Baseball, 6 in 2000 for the St. Louis Cardinals and 6 in 2002 for the Cardinals and Minnesota Twins.

Rodríguez last played professionally with the Newark Bears of the Atlantic League in 2007. Rodríguez signed a minor league contract with the Cleveland Indians in November 2008, but never played in their organization.
