= Todd Sears =

American baseball player

- First baseman
- Born: October 23, 1975 (age 50); Des Moines, Iowa, U.S.
- Batted: Left Threw: Right

MLB debut
- September 17, 2002, for the Minnesota Twins

Last MLB appearance
- September 27, 2003, for the San Diego Padres

MLB statistics
- Batting average: .259
- Home runs: 2
- Runs batted in: 11
- Stats at Baseball Reference

Teams
- Minnesota Twins (2002–2003); San Diego Padres (2003)

Todd Andrew Sears (born October 23, 1975) is an American former professional baseball first baseman for the Minnesota Twins and San Diego Padres of Major League Baseball.

== Amateur career ==
Sears attended the University of Nebraska–Lincoln, and in 1996 he played collegiate summer baseball with the Falmouth Commodores of the Cape Cod Baseball League. He earned third-team All-America honors from the NCBWA and first-team All-Big 12 honors in 1997, batting .421 with 17 homers and 79 RBIs in 62 games. He was selected in the 3rd round of the 1997 Major League Baseball draft by the Colorado Rockies.

== Professional career ==
Todd Sears spent parts of two seasons in the MLB, splitting time between the Minnesota Twins and San Diego Padres. He was called up by Minnesota on Sept. 17, 2002, hitting .333 with two doubles and three runs scored in seven contests. Sears began the 2003 season with Minnesota before being dealt to the San Diego Padres in September. He appeared in 33 games, batting .247 with two homers and 11 RBIs between the two clubs. Sears appeared in 24 games for Minnesota and drove in a career-high four runs against Boston on May 9, including his first MLB Home Run off of Pedro Martinez. In limited duty with San Diego, he batted .250 with a double and two runs scored in nine games.

Sears hit .302 with 10 RBI and 1 home run in 33 games for the Albuquerque Isotopes in 2007, his final professional season.

== Personal life ==
Shawn Sedlacek established Sed Sports, Inc. in 2006 with the goal of giving back to the game that had meant so much and played such a huge role in his life. In 2013, Shawn Sedlacek, Todd Sears, and Matt Williams decided to partner and establish Complete Game Baseball to continue the growth of the organization in pursuit of Shawn’s dream back in 2006 to give back to the game.
