= Carlos Pulido =

Venezuelan baseball player (1971–2023)

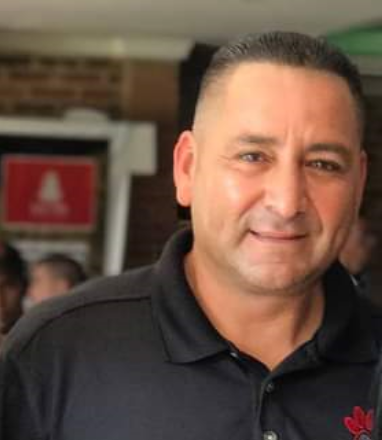
- Pitcher
- Born: August 5, 1971; Caracas, Venezuela
- Died: December 28, 2023 (aged 52); Caracas, Venezuela
- Batted: Left Threw: Left

Professional debut
- MLB: April 9, 1994, for the Minnesota Twins
- CPBL: March 1, 1998, for the Mercuries Tigers
- NPB: April 2, 2000, for the Orix BlueWave

Last appearance
- CPBL: June 5, 1998, for the Mercuries Tigers
- NPB: September 11, 2001, for the Orix BlueWave
- MLB: April 24, 2004, for the Minnesota Twins

MLB statistics
- Win–loss record: 3–8
- Earned run average: 5.98
- Strikeouts: 47

CPBL statistics
- Win–loss record: 2–2
- Earned run average: 4.26
- Strikeouts: 24

NPB statistics
- Win–loss record: 8–7
- Earned run average: 5.72
- Strikeouts: 96
- Stats at Baseball Reference

Teams
- Minnesota Twins (1994); Mercuries Tigers (1998); Orix BlueWave (2000–2001); Minnesota Twins (2003–2004)

Member of the Venezuelan

Baseball Hall of Fame
- Induction: 2024
- Vote: 76%
- Election method: Contemporary Committee

Juan Carlos Pulido Valera [poo-lee'-do] (August 5, 1971 – December 28, 2023) was a Venezuelan Major League Baseball relief pitcher who played for the Minnesota Twins in 1994 and between 2003 and 2004. He batted and threw left-handed.

== Career ==
Signed at 18 in 1989 by Minnesota, the hard-throwing Pulido was a bright prospect in the Twins' system, but a 1995 arm injury ruined his chances as a starter. After spending one season with the Twins in 1994, he spent the next decade in the minor leagues, as well as with the Orix BlueWave, before spending two more seasons with the Twins in 2003 and 2004.

In a three-season career, Pulido posted a 3–8 record with 47 strikeouts and a 5.98 ERA in 111 2/3 innings. Most notably, he was a part of baseball history on June 12, 1994, when he started a game in the Metrodome against the Chicago White Sox, who had fellow countryman Wilson Álvarez on the mound, marking the first time in major league history game that two Venezuelan starters faced each other. Pulido would earn the win in that encounter, tossing six innings of two-run ball as Hall of Famer Kirby Puckett belted a home run in the 6–2 victory.

Pulido had a successful career in Venezuelan Professional Baseball League (Liga Venezolana de Beisbol Profesional), playing for Navegantes del Magallanes, Tigres de Aragua and Cardenales de Lara. Lifetime, he had a 68–51 record, with a 3.08 ERA, in 234 appearances. In 2007, he did not play in any Summer League, instead coaching for the Texas Rangers Single-A team in the minor leagues. He was released by Cardenales in Venezuela, and rehired by his original team, Magallanes, before retiring in 2008 with Tiburones de la Guaira. In Venezuela, he was known as "El Domador de Leones" (The Lion Tamer).

Pulido was inducted into the Magallanes Hall of Fame on November 19, 2016.

On November 1, 2024, Pulido was posthumously elected to the Venezuelan Baseball Hall of Fame, receiving 76% of the votes from the Contemporary Committee.

== Death ==
After weeks of battling chronic health problems, and despite an initial health improvement, Pulido died on December 28, 2023, at a Caracas hospital. He was 52.

== See also ==
- List of Major League Baseball players from Venezuela
