= Luis Rivas =

Venezuelan baseball player (born 1979)

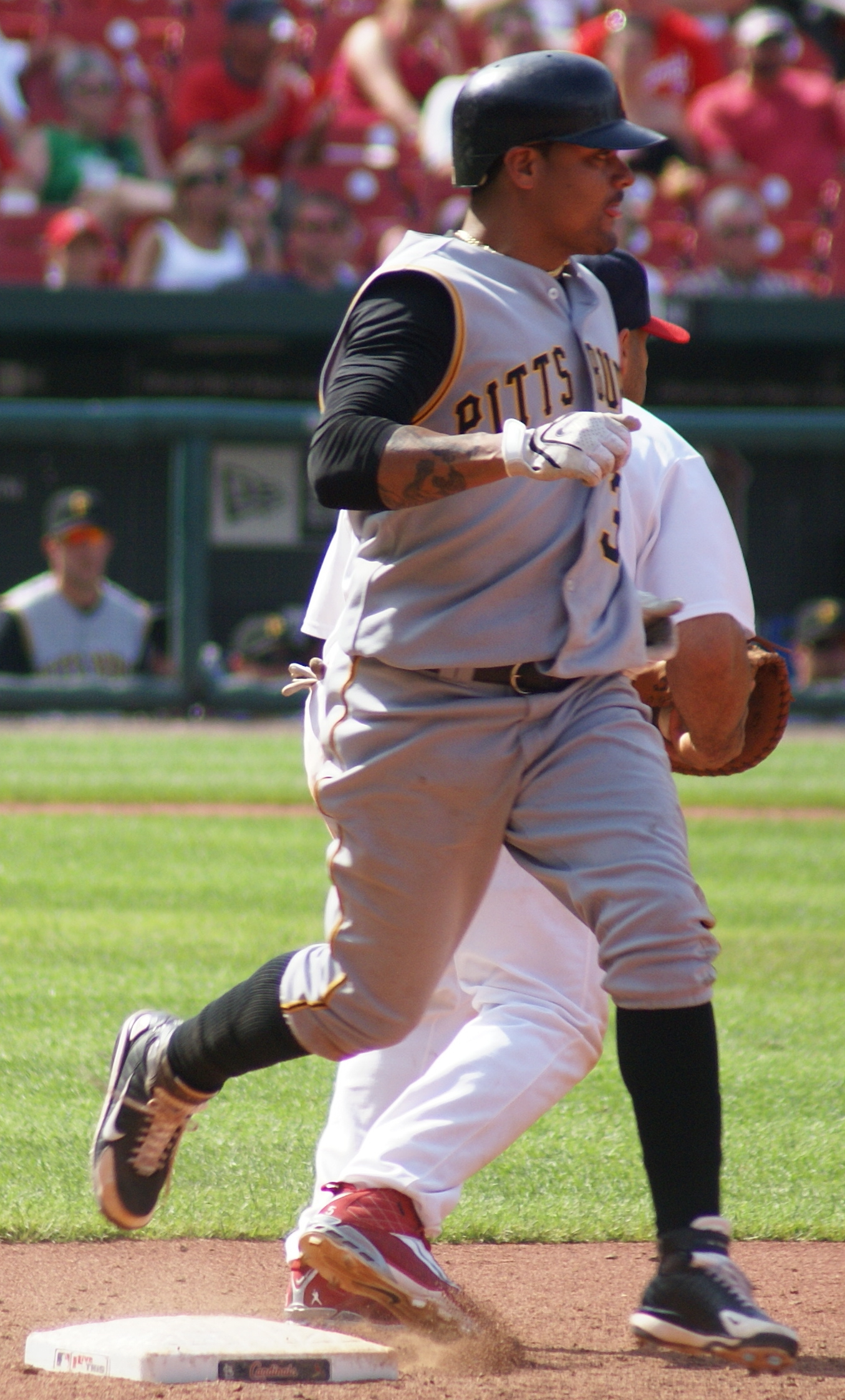
- Second baseman
- Born: August 30, 1979 (age 47); La Guaira, Venezuela
- Batted: Right Threw: Right

MLB debut
- September 16, 2000, for the Minnesota Twins

Last MLB appearance
- September 20, 2008, for the Pittsburgh Pirates

MLB statistics
- Batting average: .257
- Home runs: 34
- Runs batted in: 201
- Stats at Baseball Reference

Teams
- Minnesota Twins (2000–2005); Cleveland Indians (2007); Pittsburgh Pirates (2008)

Luis Wilfredo Rivas [ree'-vas] (born August 30, 1979) is a Venezuelan former Major League Baseball infielder. He played for the Minnesota Twins from 2000 to 2005, Cleveland Indians in 2007, and Pittsburgh Pirates in 2008. He batted and threw right-handed.

== Career ==
Rivas was an aggressive hitter who frequently swung at pitches outside the strike zone, usually making contact. ON the basepaths, he possessed good speed and played aggressively. Defensively, he exhibited good range, a strong arm, and solid field ability, showing proficiency in turning double plays and tracking pop-ups in the outfield.

From 2000 to 2004, Rivas posted a .262 batting average with 29 home runs and 165 RBI in 506 games. After the 2005 All-Star break, Minnesota optioned Rivas to Triple-A Rochester. Once thought of as the Twins' second baseman of the future, Rivas never developed into the type of consistent hitter needed. He was recalled, and then again sent back down on October 4 after the season had ended.

In 2006, Rivas played for the Durham Bulls of the International League. He hit a disappointing .218 with an OPS of .540. He signed a Minor League contract with the Cleveland Indians for the 2007 season. He hit .263 for the Triple-A Buffalo Bisons in 105 games. He earned a big league call-up on September 1, when rosters expand. In December 2007, Rivas signed a minor league contract with the Pittsburgh Pirates.

In January 2009, Rivas signed a minor league contract with the Chicago Cubs.

== See also ==
- List of Major League Baseball players from Venezuela

== Sources ==
- The ESPN Baseball Encyclopedia – Gary Gillette, Peter Gammons, Pete Palmer. Publisher: Sterling Publishing, 2005. Format: Paperback, 1824pp. Language: English. ISBN 1-4027-4771-3
