= Dustan Mohr =

American baseball player (born 1975)

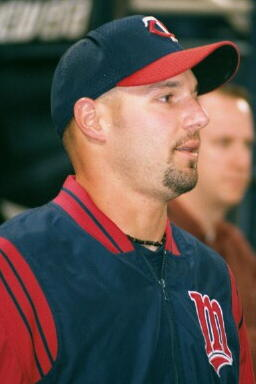
- Outfielder
- Born: June 19, 1976 (age 50); Hattiesburg, Mississippi, U.S.
- Batted: Right Threw: Right

MLB debut
- August 29, 2001, for the Minnesota Twins

Last MLB appearance
- July 8, 2007, for the Tampa Bay Devil Rays

MLB statistics
- Batting average: .249
- Home runs: 49
- Runs batted in: 156
- Stats at Baseball Reference

Teams
- Minnesota Twins (2001–2003); San Francisco Giants (2004); Colorado Rockies (2005); Boston Red Sox (2006); Tampa Bay Devil Rays (2007)

Dustan Kyle Mohr (born June 19, 1976) is an American former Major League Baseball outfielder who played for several teams between 2001 and 2007.

== Amateur career ==
A native of Hattiesburg, Mississippi, Mohr attended Oak Grove High School and the University of Alabama. In 1996, he played collegiate summer baseball with the Wareham Gatemen of the Cape Cod Baseball League. Mohr was selected by the Cleveland Indians in the ninth round of the 1997 MLB draft.

== Professional career ==
After spending three seasons in the Indians' minor league system, Mohr was released and signed with the Minnesota Twins as a free agent in 2000. Starting midway through the 2001 season, the Twins used a platoon of Mohr and Bobby Kielty in right field. This platoon persisted on and off for two years. Twins fans were so accustomed to seeing one or the other player in right field that broadcasters Bert Blyleven and Dick Bremer dubbed the duo "Dusty Kielmohr".

After four seasons in the Twins organization, Mohr was traded to the San Francisco Giants before the 2004 season. Mohr struggled during the first few months before catching fire in early June. His aggressive defense and clutch hitting made him a favorite among Giants fans.

The Giants closed in on the division leading Los Angeles Dodgers in the last month of the season. In the second to last series of the season, against the San Diego Padres, Mohr was injured as he tracked down a foul ball in right field. He tripped over the bullpen mound as the ball tailed towards the stands. He held on to the ball, and the Padres scored the game's winning run. He did not play during the season's final series against the Dodgers.

As a member of the Boston Red Sox, Dustan Mohr filled in occasionally in outfield, either replacing Trot Nixon or Coco Crisp. While Crisp was out, Mohr had a spot on the major league roster, but he struggled with the big league club hitting: .175 with 2 home runs and 3 RBI. His stint with the Red Sox was short as Mohr was demoted to the Pawtucket Red Sox where he continued to struggle at the plate. He finished the 2006 season as a member of the Detroit Tigers playing for their Triple-A affiliate, the Toledo Mud Hens.

In 2007, Mohr signed a minor league contract with the Tampa Bay Devil Rays, and was called up on June 23, but was released a month later .

Mohr signed with the Wichita Wingnuts of the American Association for the 2008 season, but signed with the Colorado Rockies on May 27, 2008. On June 23, the Rockies released Mohr. In January 2009, he re-signed with the Wingnuts.

He played with the Long Island Ducks of the Atlantic League in 2010.

== Personal life ==
In 2009, he moved to Fort Wayne, Indiana, where he was an assistant baseball coach at Northrop High School for five years until 2021 and became an instructor at a local softball and baseball training facility.

He divorced in 2012.

Mohr was arrested in Fort Wayne on August 9, 2023, and charged with several child sex crimes for alleged interactions with a 14-year-old girl he was instructing during the first six months of 2023. In March 2024 he pleaded guilty to child solicitation, child seduction and sexual misconduct with a minor, and was sentenced on April 26, 2024, to nine years in the Indiana State Prison system, and was ordered to pay $13,300.00 to two people.
