= Eddie Guardado =

American baseball player (born 1970)

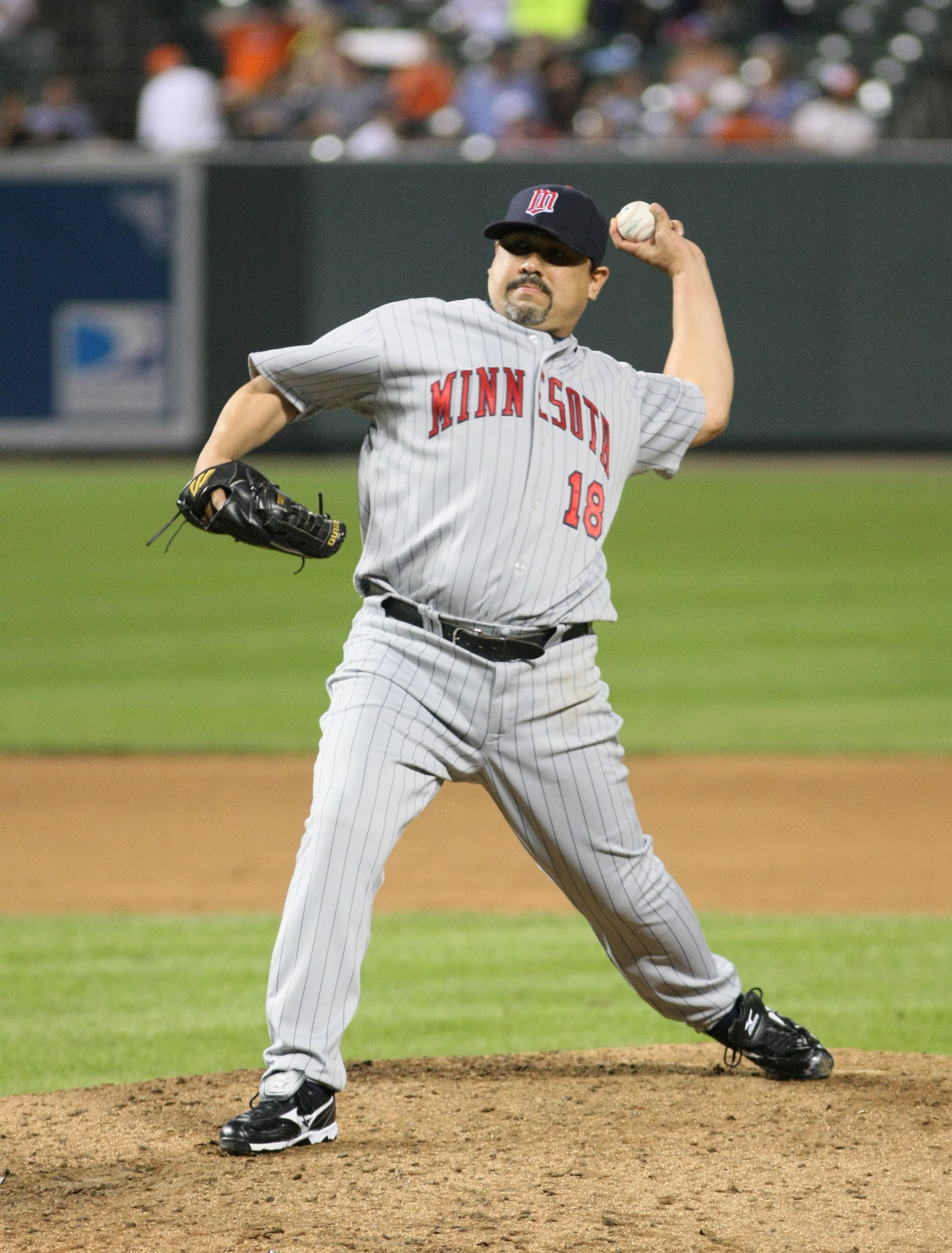
- Guardado with the Minnesota Twins in 2009
- Pitcher
- Born: October 2, 1970 (age 56); Stockton, California, U.S.
- Batted: Right Threw: Left

MLB debut
- June 13, 1993, for the Minnesota Twins

Last MLB appearance
- September 30, 2009, for the Texas Rangers

MLB statistics
- Win–loss record: 46–61
- Earned run average: 4.31
- Strikeouts: 798
- Saves: 187
- Stats at Baseball Reference

Teams
- Minnesota Twins (1993–2003); Seattle Mariners (2004–2006); Cincinnati Reds (2006–2007); Texas Rangers (2008); Minnesota Twins (2008); Texas Rangers (2009)

Career highlights and awards
- 2× All-Star (2002, 2003); AL saves leader (2002); Minnesota Twins Hall of Fame

Edward Adrian Guardado (born October 2, 1970), nicknamed "Everyday Eddie", is an American former baseball relief pitcher and bullpen coach who works for the Los Angeles Angels. Guardado played in Major League Baseball (MLB) for the Minnesota Twins (1993–2003, 2008), Seattle Mariners (2004–2006), Cincinnati Reds (2006–2007), and Texas Rangers (2008, 2009). He was an MLB All-Star in 2002, leading the American League (AL) in saves that season, and 2003.

Guardado was the Twins bullpen coach from 2015 to 2018. He has worked as a special assistant to the general manager for the Angels since 2023, serving as the bullpen coach in September 2025.

== Playing career ==
=== Minnesota Twins ===
The Minnesota Twins selected Guardado in the 21st round (570th overall) of the 1990 MLB draft out of San Joaquin Delta College in Stockton, California. He signed, forgoing a letter of intent to play college baseball for the Cal State Fullerton Titans.

Guardado made his MLB debut with the Twins in June 1993. The Twins attempted to use Guardado as a starter, but in 1996, he was converted exclusively to a relief pitcher and did not start another major league game. That season, he tied for the major league lead with 83 games pitched. In September 2001, Guardado became the Twins' closer, replacing LaTroy Hawkins. In 2002, Guardado broke Rick Aguilera's 11-year-old franchise record with 45 saves, which led the AL. He earned a save in Game 1 of the AL Division Series (ALDS) and closed out Game 5 of the series, allowing a three-run home run to Mark Ellis in the win. He earned a save in Game 1 of the AL Championship Series. Guardado followed that up with 41 saves in 2003 and was named to his second consecutive MLB All-Star Game. He made his final postseason appearance, earning a save in Game 1 of the ALDS. After that season, he became a free agent.

=== Seattle Mariners ===
On December 9, 2003, Guardado signed a one-year, $13 million contract with the Seattle Mariners. The deal also included player and team options for 2005 and 2006. In 2004, Guardado saved 18 games and had a 2.78 earned run average in 41 appearances but suffered a torn rotator cuff and missed the last two months of the season. In 2005, he set the Mariners' record with 27 consecutive saves, later broken by J. J. Putz. On May 4, 2006, after three blown saves in fewer than three weeks, Guardado was temporarily removed from the closer role. Manager Mike Hargrove said, "We're just trying to get him to step back from the edge a little bit, get himself going a little bit so we can get him back out there again and be the closer like we know he can."

=== Cincinnati Reds ===
On July 6, 2006, Guardado was traded along with cash to the Cincinnati Reds for minor league pitcher Travis Chick. Guardado converted eight of his first nine save situations with the Reds. In August, Guardado was placed on the disabled list after injuring his elbow. He underwent Tommy John surgery in September, ending his season.

On February 5, 2007, Guardado re-signed with the Reds on a minor league contract with an invitation to spring training. He returned to the majors on August 9, giving up two hits and a sacrifice fly that allowed the Los Angeles Dodgers to tie the game at 4–4. The Dodgers eventually won 5–4 in 11 innings.

=== Later career ===
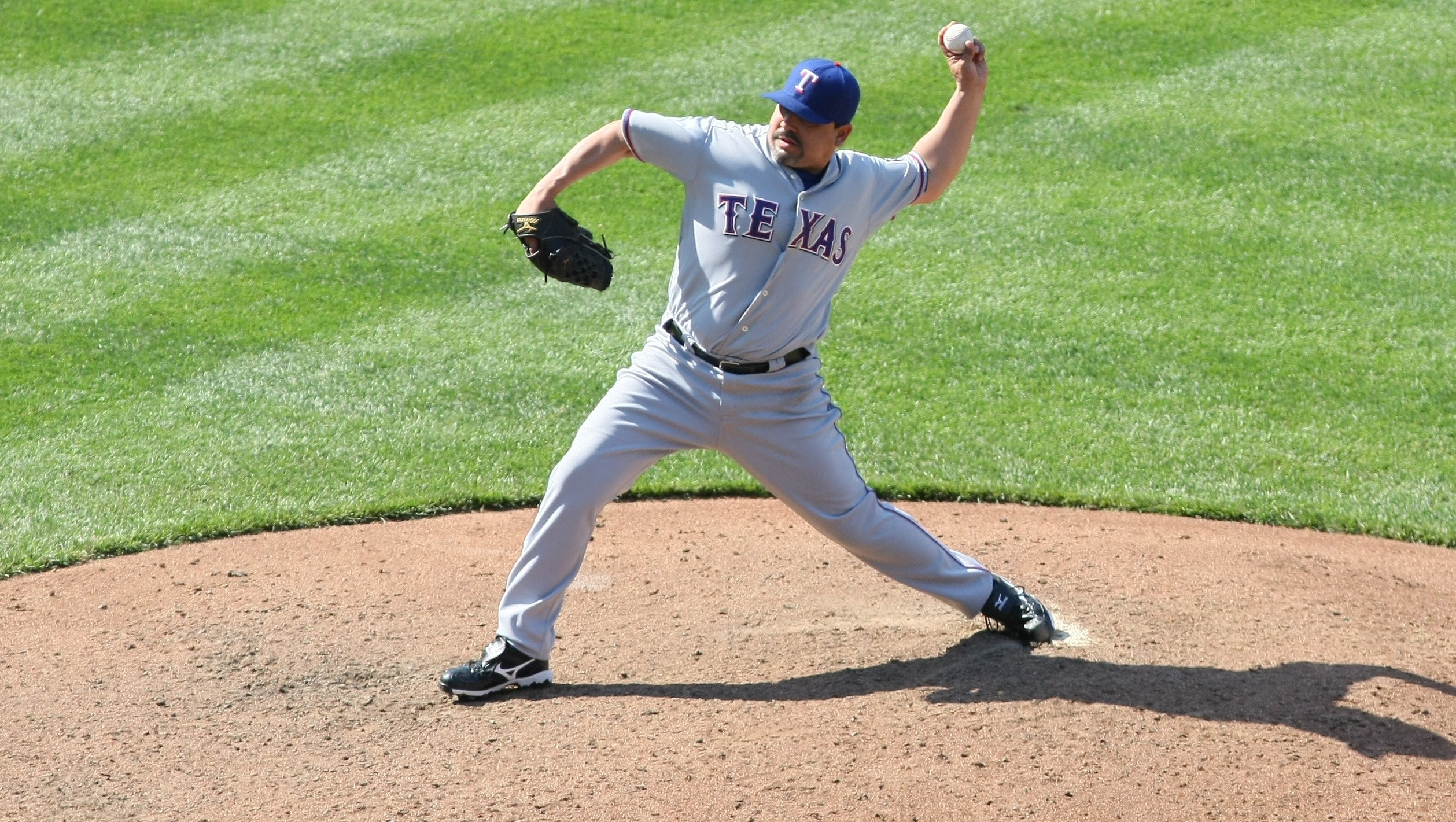
Guardado with the Texas Rangers in 2009.

On January 11, 2008, Guardado signed a one-year, $2 million contract with the Texas Rangers. On August 25, he was traded back to the Twins for minor league pitcher Mark Hamburger. On February 3, 2009, Guardado returned to the Rangers on a minor league contract with an invitation to spring training. In 48 games with the Rangers in 2009, he went 1–2 with a 4.46 ERA.

After considering retirement during the 2009–10 offseason, Guardado decided to come back to baseball by agreeing to terms on a minor league deal with the Washington Nationals on December 26. On March 11, 2010, Washington released Guardado. In August, he announced his retirement.

Through 2021, Guardado holds the MLB record for the longest streak of games pitched without allowing a triple: it was 551 games, dating to the end of his career. The last person to hit a triple off Guardado was Tony Graffanino in September 1999.

== Post-playing career ==
Guardado served as a special assistant for the Twins during spring training in 2013 and coached minor league pitchers. On January 25, 2013, Guardado was elected to the Minnesota Twins Hall Of Fame along with longtime media relations director Tom Mee.

In the summer of 2014, he was the head coach for the Tustin, California Little League All-Stars. On November 19, 2014, Guardado was named bullpen coach for the Minnesota Twins. He was fired on October 31, 2018.

In 2023, Guardado joined the Los Angeles Angels as a special assistant to the general manager. He was the team's bullpen coach in September 2025, following an injury to Steve Karsay. Guardado returned to the special assistant role in 2026.

== Personal life ==
Guardado and his wife have three children. Their oldest son, Niko, was a cast member on the 2020 TV series Party of Five. Their son Jakob played college baseball at Pasadena City College and for the Pacific Tigers. Jakob signed with the Angels in 2025, while Guardado worked for the team. A 2026 report by The Athletic identified the signing of Jakob and his friend as potential instances of nepotism.

Guardado has eight siblings. His older brother, Danny, played college baseball at Lewis–Clark State College, winning an NAIA World Series championship in 1988. Their father immigrated to California from Mexico. Guardado bought his father and stepmother a house.

Guardado's nickname, "Everyday Eddie", refers to his durable arm during his first stint with the Twins. He pitched in 908 MLB games, which ranks in the top 30 all time.

Guardado, fellow former MLB player Dan Petry, and musician Douglas Docker have a podcast focusing on the lives of dictators' children.
