= 2000 Minnesota Twins season =

2000 Minnesota Twins
- League: American League
- Division: Central
- Ballpark: Hubert H. Humphrey Metrodome
- City: Minneapolis
- Record: 69–93 (.426)
- Divisional place: 5th
- Owners: Carl Pohlad
- General managers: Terry Ryan
- Managers: Tom Kelly
- Television: KMSP-TV; Midwest Sports Channel (Bert Blyleven, Dick Bremer)
- Radio: 830 WCCO AM (Herb Carneal, John Gordon, Dan Gladden)

The 2000 Minnesota Twins season was the 40th season for the Minnesota Twins franchise in the Twin Cities of Minnesota, their 19th season at Hubert H. Humphrey Metrodome and the 100th overall in the American League.

The Twins compiled a record of 69–93 during the 2000 Major League Baseball season. It was the team's last of a consecutive string record of eight losing seasons and it was characterized with weak hitting but slightly better pitching. The team was managed by Tom Kelly and contained the nucleus of future manager Ron Gardenhire's team that would reach the postseason only two years later.

== Offseason ==
- December 13, 1999: Under the Rule 5 draft, the Twins send minor leaguer Jared Camp and cash to the Florida Marlins in exchange for future Cy Young Award winner Johan Santana.
- January 4: Signed catcher Marcus Jensen as a free agent. Jensen was granted free agency on October 2.
- January 27: Signed Butch Huskey as a free agent. On July 15, the team traded Huskey to the Colorado Rockies for Todd Sears and cash.

== Regular season ==
- T.C. Bear, the team's mascot, was first introduced to the team's fans on April 3.
- Tampa Bay's Gerald Williams homered on the first pitch thrown in the Metrodome this year. Minnesota's Matt Lawton homered on the Dome's final pitch this year.
- On April 9, a major league first occurred, when both teams posted innings with back-to-back-to-back home runs. In the sixth, Twins Ron Coomer, Jacque Jones and Matthew LeCroy belted consecutive homers. In the Kansas City Royals' eighth, Carlos Beltrán, Jermaine Dye and Mike Sweeney homered off Twins pitchers Eddie Guardado and Héctor Carrasco.
- On April 15, Héctor Carrasco gave up Cal Ripken's 3,000th hit, in the Dome. Of the 24 players who have reached that plateau, now three have collected the benchmark hit off Twins' pitching: in 1995, Mike Trombley gave up Eddie Murray's 3,000th hit, also in the Dome. In 1985, Frank Viola watched Rod Carew stroke his 3,000th hit in Anaheim Stadium.
- On May 10, the club overcame their largest deficit to win. Down 8–1 in the seventh, the Twins finished the nine-inning game with a 10–9 win. Eddie Guardado threw thirteen pitches and collected the win over the Cleveland Indians.
- The lone representative of the Twins in the All-Star Game was outfielder Matt Lawton.
- The highest paid Twin in 2000 was Brad Radke at $3,500,000; followed by Matt Lawton at $2,000,000.
- Harmon Killebrew, Rod Carew, Tony Oliva, Kent Hrbek, Kirby Puckett, and Calvin Griffith were the inaugural inductees in the Twins Hall of Fame.

=== Offense ===
The most solid offensive year came from the team's lone all-star representative, right fielder Matt Lawton. Lawton hit .305 with 13 home runs, 88 RBI, and 23 stolen bases. Also notable this year were shortstop Cristian Guzmán's major league leading 20 triples (a Twins record). Like most of his career with the Twins, David Ortiz spent much of the 2000 season rehabbing injuries. He did, however, play in 88 games as the team's designated hitter. The Twins also experimented with Butch Huskey in the DH spot. Not surprisingly, this was not a successful experiment, with Huskey playing in only 39 games at the position.

Team Leaders
Statistic	Player	Quantity
HR	Jacque Jones	19
RBI	Matt Lawton	88
BA	Matt Lawton	.305
Runs	Cristian Guzmán	89

=== Pitching ===
The starting rotation showed flashes of brilliance with Brad Radke, Eric Milton, Mark Redman, and Joe Mays in for most of the year. Radke, Milton, and Redman all had ERAs of under 5. The fifth starter was uncertain, with Sean Bergman making 14 starts, and J. C. Romero making 11. Romero's ERA of 7.02 did not suggest the dominant reliever he would subsequently become.

Despite uncertainty as to the identity of the closer, the bullpen was stellar. LaTroy Hawkins, Bob Wells, Eddie Guardado, Travis Miller, and Héctor Carrasco all had strong years out of the bullpen. Hawkins led the club with 14 saves.

One notable presence among the pitching staff was rookie Johan Santana, acquired from the Houston Astros via the Florida Marlins in the Rule 5 draft. In order for the Twins to keep Santana under Rule 5, Santana was required to stay on the major league roster for the entire season. He did, and his numbers did nothing to suggest he would one day win a Cy Young Award. His ERA was 6.49 and he struck out 64 batters in 86 innings. He was used almost exclusively in mop-up roles, although he did start five games. He spent most of the 2001 season in the minor leagues. The Twins' foresight in keeping him on the roster during the 2000 season must be regarded as one of the greatest uses ever of the Rule 5 draft.

Team Leaders
Statistic	Player	Quantity
ERA	Brad Radke	4.45
Wins	Eric Milton	13
Saves	LaTroy Hawkins	14
Strikeouts	Eric Milton	160

=== Defense ===
The infield was mostly steady with Ron Coomer at first, Jay Canizaro at second, Guzman at short, Corey Koskie at third, and Denny Hocking backing them all up. The 2000 season saw the inception of the "Soul Patrol" outfield of Jacque Jones, Torii Hunter, and Lawton. Nobody was able to establish himself as the everyday catcher, with Matt LeCroy playing in 48 games at the position, Chad Moeller in 40, Marcus Jensen in 37, A. J. Pierzynski in 27, and Danny Ardoin in 10.

=== Season standings ===
AL Central
Team	W	L	Pct.	GB	Home	Road
Chicago White Sox	95	67	.586	—	46‍–‍35	49‍–‍32
Cleveland Indians	90	72	.556	5	48‍–‍33	42‍–‍39
Detroit Tigers	79	83	.488	16	43‍–‍38	36‍–‍45
Kansas City Royals	77	85	.475	18	42‍–‍39	35‍–‍46
Minnesota Twins	69	93	.426	26	36‍–‍45	33‍–‍48

=== Record vs. opponents ===
2000 American League record Source: MLB Standings Grid – 2000
Team	ANA	BAL	BOS	CWS	CLE	DET	KC	MIN	NYY	OAK	SEA	TB	TEX	TOR	NL
Anaheim	—	7–5	5–4	4–6	3–6	5–5	6–6	7–3	5–5	5–8	5–8	6–6	7–5	5–7	12–6
Baltimore	5–7	—	5–7	4–6	5–4	6–4	3–7	6–3	5–7	4–8	3–7	8–5	6–6	7–6	7–11
Boston	4–5	7–5	—	7–5	6–6	7–5	4–6	8–2	6–7	5–5	5–5	6–6	7–3	4–8	9–9
Chicago	6–4	6–4	5–7	—	8–5	9–3	5–7	7–5	8–4	6–3	7–5	6–4	5–5	5–5	12–6
Cleveland	6–3	4–5	6–6	5–8	—	6–7	5–7	5–8	5–5	6–6	7–2	8–2	6–4	8–4	13–5
Detroit	5–5	4–6	5–7	3–9	7–6	—	5–7	7–6	8–4	6–4	7–2	4–5	5–5	3–9	10–8
Kansas City	6–6	7–3	6–4	7–5	7–5	7–5	—	7–5	2–8	4–8	4–8	5–5	3–7	4–6	8–10
Minnesota	3–7	3–6	2–8	5–7	8–5	6–7	5–7	—	5–5	5–7	3–9	4–6	8–4	5–4	7–11
New York	5–5	7–5	7–6	4–8	5–5	4–8	8–2	5–5	—	6–3	4–6	6–6	10–2	5–7	11–6
Oakland	8–5	8–4	5–5	3–6	6–6	4–6	8–4	7–5	3–6	—	9–4	7–2	5–7	7–3	11–7
Seattle	8–5	7–3	5–5	5–7	2–7	2–7	8–4	9–3	6–4	4–9	—	9–3	7–5	8–2	11–7
Tampa Bay	6–6	5–8	6–6	4–6	2–8	5–4	5–5	6–4	6–6	2–7	3–9	—	5–7	5–7	9–9
Texas	5–7	6–6	3–7	5–5	4–6	5–5	7–3	4–8	2–10	7–5	5–7	7–5	—	4–6	7–11
Toronto	7–5	6–7	8–4	5–5	4–8	9–3	6–4	4–5	7–5	3–7	2–8	7–5	6–4	—	9–9

=== Notable transactions ===
- April 1: Signed outfielder Dustan Mohr as a free agent.
- April 4: Signed infielder Jay Canizaro as a free agent.
- May 23: Selected Casey Blake off waivers from the Toronto Blue Jays.
- June 5: In the amateur draft, the Twins drafted future major leaguers such as pitcher Adam Johnson (1st round, second pick) and outfielder Jason Kubel (12th round).
- June 22: Released pitcher Sean Bergman.
- August 31, 2000: Midre Cummings was traded by the Minnesota Twins to the Boston Red Sox for Hector De Los Santos (minors).
- September 9: Traded pitcher Héctor Carrasco to the Boston Red Sox for outfielder Lew Ford.
- December 11: Brandon Knight was drafted by the Twins from the New York Yankees in the 2000 rule 5 draft.
- December 19: Signed catcher Tom Prince as a free agent.
- December 20: Ron Coomer granted free agency; pitcher Mike Lincoln released.

=== Roster ===
2000 Minnesota Twins
Roster
Pitchers: 38 Sean Bergman; 58 Héctor Carrasco; 59 Jack Cressend; 18 Eddie Guardado; 32 LaTroy Hawkins; 51 Matt Kinney; 19 Mike Lincoln; 53 Joe Mays; 20 Travis Miller; 21 Eric Milton; 52 Danny Mota; 22 Brad Radke; 55 Mark Redman; 33 J. C. Romero; 54 Jason Ryan; 57 Johan Santana; 46 Bob Wells	Catchers: 12 Danny Ardoin; 28 Marcus Jensen; 24 Matthew LeCroy; 39 Chad Moeller; 26 A. J. Pierzynski; Infielders: 38 Casey Blake; 1 Jay Canizaro; 8 Ron Coomer; 15 Cristian Guzmán; 47 Corey Koskie; 9 Jason Maxwell; 25 Doug Mientkiewicz; 27 David Ortiz; 2 Luis Rivas; 12 Todd Walker	Outfielders: 31 Chad Allen; 40 John Barnes; 30 Brian Buchanan; 16 Midre Cummings; 7 Denny Hocking; 48 Torii Hunter; 42 Butch Huskey; 11 Jacque Jones; 50 Matt Lawton	Manager: 10 Tom Kelly; Coaches: 35 Ron Gardenhire (third base); 4 Paul Molitor; 43 Rick Stelmaszek (bullpen); 44 Dick Such (pitching); 45 Scott Ullger; 13 Jerry White

== Player stats ==
= Indicates team leader

=== Batting ===
==== Starters by position ====
Note: Pos = Position; G = Games played; AB = At bats; H = Hits; Avg. = Batting average; HR = Home runs; RBI = Runs batted in

Pos	Player	G	AB	H	Avg.	HR	RBI
C	Matt LeCroy	56	167	29	.174	5	17
1B	Ron Coomer	140	544	147	.270	16	82
2B	Jay Canizaro	102	346	93	.269	7	40
SS	Christian Guzmán	156	631	156	.247	8	54
3B	Corey Koskie	146	474	142	.300	9	65
LF	Jacque Jones	154	523	149	.285	19	76
CF	Torii Hunter	99	336	94	.280	5	44
RF	Matt Lawton	156	561	171	.305	13	88
DH	David Ortiz	130	415	117	.282	10	63

==== Other batters ====
Note: G = Games played; AB = At bats; H = Hits; Avg. = Batting average; HR = Home runs; RBI = Runs batted in

Player	G	AB	H	Avg.	HR	RBI
Denny Hocking	134	373	111	.298	4	47
Butch Huskey	64	215	48	.223	5	27
Midre Cummings	77	181	50	.276	4	22
Marcus Jensen	52	139	29	.209	3	14
Chad Moeller	48	128	27	.211	1	9
Jason Maxwell	64	111	27	.243	1	11
A. J. Pierzynski	33	88	27	.307	2	11
Brian Buchanan	30	82	19	.232	1	8
Todd Walker	23	77	18	.234	2	8
Luis Rivas	16	58	18	.310	0	6
Chad Allen	15	50	15	.300	0	7
John Barnes	11	37	13	.351	0	2
Danny Ardoin	15	32	4	.125	1	5
Casey Blake	7	16	3	.188	0	1
Doug Mientkiewicz	3	14	6	.429	0	4

=== Pitching ===
= Indicates league leader

==== Starting pitchers ====
Note: G = Games pitched; IP = Innings pitched; W = Wins; L = Losses; ERA = Earned run average; SO = Strikeouts

Player	G	IP	W	L	ERA	SO
Brad Radke	34	226.2	12	16	4.45	141
Eric Milton	33	200.0	13	10	4.86	160
Joe Mays	31	160.1	7	15	5.56	102
Mark Redman	32	151.1	12	9	4.76	117
Sean Bergman	15	68.0	4	5	9.66	35
J.C. Romero	12	57.2	2	7	7.02	50
Matt Kinney	8	42.1	2	2	5.10	24

==== Other pitchers ====
Note: G = Games pitched; IP = Innings pitched; W = Wins; L = Losses; ERA = Earned run average; SO = Strikeouts

Player	G	IP	W	L	ERA	SO
Johan Santana	30	86.0	2	3	6.49	64
Mike Lincoln	8	20.2	0	3	10.89	15

==== Relief pitchers ====
Note: G = Games pitched; W = Wins; L = Losses; SV = Saves; ERA = Earned run average; SO = Strikeouts

Player	G	W	L	SV	ERA	SO
LaTroy Hawkins	66	2	5	14	3.39	59
Bob Wells	76	0	7	10	3.65	76
Eddie Guardado	70	7	4	9	3.94	52
Travis Miller	67	2	3	1	3.90	62
Héctor Carrasco	61	4	3	1	4.25	57
Jason Ryan	16	0	1	0	7.62	19
Jack Cressend	11	0	0	0	5.27	6
Danny Mota	4	0	0	0	8.44	3

== Other post-season awards ==
- Calvin R. Griffith Award (Most Valuable Twin) – Matt Lawton
- Joseph W. Haynes Award (Twins Pitcher of the Year) – Eric Milton
- Bill Boni Award (Twins Outstanding Rookie) – Mark Redman
- Charles O. Johnson Award (Most Improved Twin) – Cristian Guzmán
- Dick Siebert Award (Upper Midwest Player of the Year) – Darin Erstad
  - The above awards are voted on by the Twin Cities chapter of the BBWAA
- Carl R. Pohlad Award (Outstanding Community Service) – Denny Hocking
- Sherry Robertson Award (Twins Outstanding Farm System Player) – John Barnes

== Farm system ==
Level	Team	League	Manager
AAA	Salt Lake Buzz	Pacific Coast League	Phil Roof
AA	New Britain Rock Cats	Eastern League	John Russell
A	Fort Myers Miracle	Florida State League	Jose Marzan
A	Quad Cities River Bandits	Midwest League	Stan Cliburn
Rookie	Elizabethton Twins	Appalachian League	Jeff Carter
Rookie	GCL Twins	Gulf Coast League	Al Newman

LEAGUE CHAMPIONS: Elizabethton
