= 1998 in baseball =

The following are the baseball events of the year 1998 throughout the world.

== Headline events of the year ==
- Mark McGwire, Sammy Sosa, Ken Griffey Jr. and Greg Vaughn all hit 30 home runs before the All-Star break (the first time four players had done so in the same season) and engage in a historic chase for Roger Maris's single-season record of 61 home runs. While Griffey (56) and Vaughn (50) would fall short of the record, both Sosa (66) and McGwire (70) shattered Maris's record in an exciting late-season chase that culminated in a final week that saw record-setting performances by McGwire, Sosa, Tom Gordon, Dennis Eckersley, Trevor Hoffman and Jason Kendall. The New York Yankees won a major league record 125 games (114 regular season games and 11 postseason games).

== Champions ==
=== Major League Baseball ===
- World Series: New York Yankees over San Diego Padres (4-0); Scott Brosius, MVP

Division Series (ALDS, NLDS)
1	NY Yankees	3
3	Texas	0
American League
2	Cleveland	3
4	Boston	1
1	Atlanta	3
4	Chicago Cubs	0
National League
2	Houston	1
3	San Diego	3

League Championship Series (ALCS, NLCS)
1	NY Yankees	4
2	Cleveland	2
1	Atlanta	2
3	San Diego	4

World Series
AL1	NY Yankees	4
NL3	San Diego	0

- American League Championship Series MVP: David Wells
  - American League Division Series
- National League Championship Series MVP: Sterling Hitchcock
  - National League Division Series
- All-Star Game, July 7 at Coors Field: American League, 13–8; Roberto Alomar, MVP

=== Other champions ===
- Baseball World Cup: Cuba
- Caribbean World Series: Águilas Cibaeñas (Dominican Republic)
- College World Series: USC
- Cuban National Series: Pinar del Río over Santiago de Cuba
- Japan Series: Yokohama BayStars over Seibu Lions (4-2)
- Korean Series: Hyundai Unicorns over LG Twins
- Big League World Series: Thousand Oaks, California
- Junior League World Series: Mission Viejo, California
- Little League World Series: Toms River, New Jersey
- Senior League World Series: Diamond Bar, California
- Taiwan Series: Wei Chuan Dragons over Sinon Bulls

== Awards and honors ==
- Baseball Hall of Fame
  - George Davis
  - Larry Doby
  - Lee MacPhail
  - Bullet Rogan
  - Don Sutton
- Most Valuable Player
  - Juan González, Texas Rangers, OF (AL)
  - Sammy Sosa, Chicago Cubs, OF (NL)
- Cy Young Award
  - Roger Clemens, Toronto Blue Jays (AL)
  - Tom Glavine, Atlanta Braves (NL)
- Rookie of the Year
  - Ben Grieve, Oakland Athletics, OF (AL)
  - Kerry Wood, Chicago Cubs, P (NL)
- Manager of the Year Award
  - Joe Torre, New York Yankees (AL)
  - Larry Dierker, Houston Astros (NL)
- Gold Glove Award
  - Rafael Palmeiro (1B) (AL)
  - Roberto Alomar (2B) (AL)
  - Robin Ventura (3B) (AL)
  - Omar Vizquel (SS) (AL)
  - Jim Edmonds (OF) (AL)
  - Ken Griffey Jr. (OF) (AL)
  - Bernie Williams (OF) (AL)
  - Iván Rodríguez (C) (AL)
  - Mike Mussina (P) (AL)
  - J. T. Snow (1B) (NL)
  - Bret Boone (2B) (NL)
  - Scott Rolen (3B) (NL)
  - Rey Ordóñez (SS) (NL)
  - Barry Bonds (OF) (NL)
  - Andruw Jones (OF) (NL)
  - Larry Walker (OF) (NL)
  - Charles Johnson (C) (NL)
  - Greg Maddux (P) (NL)

== MLB statistical leaders ==
	American League		National League
Type	Name	Stat	Name	Stat
AVG	Bernie Williams NYY	.339	Larry Walker COL	.363
HR	Ken Griffey Jr. SEA	56	Mark McGwire STL	70
RBI	Juan González TEX	157	Sammy Sosa CHC	158
Wins	Roger Clemens TOR; David Cone NYY; Rick Helling TEX	20	Tom Glavine ATL	20
ERA	Roger Clemens TOR	2.65	Greg Maddux ATL	2.22

== Major League Baseball final standings ==
American League
Rank	Club	Wins	Losses	Win %	GB
East Division
1st	New York Yankees	114	48	.704	--
2nd	Boston Red Sox *	92	70	.568	22.0
3rd	Toronto Blue Jays	88	74	.543	26.0
4th	Baltimore Orioles	79	83	.488	35.0
5th	Tampa Bay Devil Rays	63	99	.389	51.0
Central Division
1st	Cleveland Indians	89	73	.549	--
2nd	Chicago White Sox	80	82	.494	9.0
3rd	Kansas City Royals	72	89	.447	16.5
4th	Minnesota Twins	70	92	.432	19.0
5th	Detroit Tigers	65	97	.401	24.0
West Division
1st	Texas Rangers	88	74	.543	--
2nd	Anaheim Angels	85	77	.525	3.0
3rd	Seattle Mariners	76	85	.472	11.5
4th	Oakland Athletics	74	88	.457	14.0

National League
Rank	Club	Wins	Losses	Win %	GB
East Division
1st	Atlanta Braves	106	56	.654	--
2nd	New York Mets	88	74	.543	18.0
3rd	Philadelphia Phillies	75	87	.463	31.0
4th	Montreal Expos	65	97	.401	41.0
5th	Florida Marlins	54	108	.333	52.0
Central Division
1st	Houston Astros	102	60	.630	--
2nd	Chicago Cubs *	90	73	.552	12.5
3rd	St. Louis Cardinals	83	79	.512	19.0
4th	Cincinnati Reds	77	85	.475	25.0
5th	Milwaukee Brewers	74	88	.457	28.0
6th	Pittsburgh Pirates	69	93	.426	33.0
West Division
1st	San Diego Padres	98	64	.605	--
2nd	San Francisco Giants	89	74	.546	9.5
3rd	Los Angeles Dodgers	83	79	.512	15.0
4th	Colorado Rockies	77	85	.475	21.0
5th	Arizona Diamondbacks	65	97	.401	33.0

- The asterisk denotes the club that won the wild card for its respective league. The Chicago Cubs defeated the San Francisco Giants 5-3 in a one-game playoff to determine the NL wild card.

== Events ==
=== January ===
- January 5 – Don Sutton, a 324-game winner, is elected to the Baseball Hall of Fame on his fifth try. Sutton, who missed election by nine votes in 1997, is named on 81.6% of the ballots.
- January 8 – The New York Yankees sign Darryl Strawberry as a free agent.

=== February ===
- February 2 – New York Yankees general manager Bob Watson announces his resignation. He is replaced by 30-year-old Brian Cashman.
- February 6 – The Minnesota Twins trade Chuck Knoblauch to the New York Yankees in exchange for Cristian Guzman, Brian Buchanan, Eric Milton, Danny Mota and cash considerations.
- February 18 – The New York Mets sign Nelson Cruz as an amateur free agent.

=== March ===
- March 3 – Larry Doby, Lee MacPhail, George Davis and Bullet Joe Rogan are elected to the Hall of Fame by the Veterans Committee.
- March 23 – The New York Yankees sign Orlando Hernandez as an amateur free agent.
- March 31 :
  - The Tampa Bay Devil Rays lose to the Detroit Tigers 11–6, in their first game ever. Pitcher Wilson Álvarez takes the loss for Tampa while third baseman Wade Boggs hit the first home run in team history and drives in three runs.
  - The Arizona Diamondbacks drop a 9–2 decision to the Colorado Rockies in their first game ever. Andy Benes is tagged with the loss. Rookies Travis Lee and Karim García hit home runs, while Vinny Castilla drives in five runs for Colorado.
  - The New York Mets beat their division rival Philadelphia Phillies, 1–0, in the longest scoreless opening day game in the National League and the longest one in Major League Baseball since 1926, when the Washington Senators beat the Philadelphia Athletics 1–0 in 15 innings. Mets backup catcher Alberto Castillo delivered a full-count, two-out, pinch-hit single to right with the bases loaded off Philadelphia closer Ricky Bottalico to finish the game.
  - In their National League debut, the Milwaukee Brewers fall 2–1 at Turner Field in Atlanta to the team that preceded them in Milwaukee, the Atlanta Braves. The Atlanta victory came in walk-off fashion following an errant throw to second base by catcher Mike Matheny, which allowed Gerald Williams to score from third base. Bob Wickman took the loss in relief. The Brewers had played for 29 years in the American League, debuting in 1969 as the Seattle Pilots before moving to Milwaukee in 1970 and becoming the Brewers.

=== April ===
- April 1 – The expansion Tampa Bay Devil Rays win their first game in franchise history, beating the Tigers 11–8. Fred McGriff has four RBI on three hits.
- April 2 :
  - By hitting a home run in Colorado's 6–4 win over Arizona at Bank One Ballpark, Rockies outfielder Ellis Burks sets a major league record by having homered in 33 different stadiums.
  - The Milwaukee Brewers win for the first time as a National League team with an 8–6 win over the Atlanta Braves in 11 innings at Turner Field in Atlanta. Jeromy Burnitz homers twice, including a tie-breaking grand slam off Atlanta reliever Brian Edmondson in the 11th inning. Mike Myers picked up the win in relief.
- April 5 – The Arizona Diamondbacks win their first game in franchise history 3–2, over the San Francisco Giants. Andy Benes gets the win for the 1-5 Diamondbacks.
- April 7 – In the first National League game in Milwaukee since September 22, 1965, the Brewers defeat the Montreal Expos 6–4 at County Stadium. Starter Scott Karl gets the win, Doug Jones gets the save, and Jeromy Burnitz and José Valentín both contribute with home runs.
- April 10 – The Los Angeles Dodgers' Mike Piazza becomes the fifth NL player in history to hit grand slams in consecutive games by homering in a 7–2 win over the Houston Astros. Piazza also homered with the bags full, while driving in six runs, in the prior night's 7–2 win over Arizona. He would hit another on April 24 to tie the major-league record for slams in a month.
- April 11 – Boston Red Sox pitcher Pedro Martínez hurled a two-hit complete game shutout in his debut at Fenway Park, guiding the Boston Red Sox to a 5–0 victory over the visiting Seattle Mariners. Martínez stroke out 12 batters and walked only two, while Jim Leyritz led the Red Sox offense with a three-run home run in the third inning off Jamie Moyer. During the game, Dominican Republic flags showed up in the ballpark while chants of 'Pe-dro!, 'Pe-dro! were heard loud and clear in the stands. Besides, fans mounted the 'K' placards to mark Pedro's strikeouts. Afterwards, everyone in the largely Latino Jamaica Plain section of Boston started watching the Red Sox and going to the games.
- April 13 – The Seattle Mariners' Ken Griffey Jr. slugs two home runs in a 6–5 loss to the Cleveland Indians. In doing so, he becomes the second–youngest player in big league history to reach 300 homers for his career, at 28 years and 143 days. Jimmie Foxx, at 27 years 328 days, was younger.

=== May ===
- May 3 – The Seattle Mariners' Dan Wilson becomes just the seventh catcher in major league history to hit an inside-the-park grand slam, as Seattle defeats Detroit 10–6. It's a first for the Mariners and the first in the AL since Mike Greenwell did it on September 1, 1990.
- May 6 – In one of the finest pitching efforts ever, Chicago Cubs rookie right-hander Kerry Wood fans 20 Houston Astros in a 2–0, one-hit victory to tie the major league mark for strikeouts in a 9-inning game. The 20-year-old ties the record held by Roger Clemens, who performed the feat twice. He also eclipses Bill Gullickson's single-game rookie record of 18 strikeouts in 1980. The only Houston baserunners come from an infield single to Ricky Gutiérrez in the 3rd inning and a hit batter. Wood also becomes the second pitcher in baseball history to record a single-game strikeout total equal to his age (in 1936, 17-year-old Bob Feller struck out 17 batters). Wood strikes out the first five batters of the game, and seven in a row between the 7th and 9th innings, tying Jamie Moyer's Cubs record for most consecutive strikeouts.
- May 11 – In a 4–2 win over Arizona, Kerry Wood strikes out 13 Diamondbacks in seven innings. By doing so, Wood sets a major league record with 33 strikeouts over two consecutive games.
- May 13 – The Atlanta Braves set an NL record by homering in their 25th straight game, a 10–2 win over the St. Louis Cardinals. This ties the major league mark held by the 1941 Yankees and the 1994 Tigers. The streak will be stopped by the Cardinals the next day.
- May 15 – In one of the biggest trades in recent years, the Dodgers send All-Star catcher Mike Piazza and third baseman Todd Zeile to the Florida Marlins in exchange for outfielders Gary Sheffield and Jim Eisenreich, catcher Charles Johnson, third baseman Bobby Bonilla, and pitcher Manuel Barrios. On May 22, the Mets will acquire Piazza from the Marlins in exchange for outfielder Preston Wilson, pitcher Ed Yarnall and a minor league player.
- May 17 – Yankees pitcher David Wells hurls the 15th perfect game in modern major league history with a 4–0 win over the Minnesota Twins. Wells fans 11 batters in his masterpiece. Bernie Williams strokes three hits for New York, including a home run.
- May 18 – The Oakland Athletics' Mike Blowers hits for the cycle and drives home four runs in the A's 14–0 win over the White Sox. Blowers becomes only the 2nd player in franchise history to accomplish the feat.
- May 19 – The Cardinals' Mark McGwire hits three home runs in a game for the 2nd time this season, leading St. Louis to a 10–8 victory over the Philadelphia Phillies. He is only the 12th player in history to have a pair of 3–HR games in the same season. McGwire drives in six of the Cardinal runs as he reaches the 20 home run mark faster than any other player in history.
- May 20 – The Triple-A Indianapolis Indians perform a feat possibly never before duplicated in professional baseball. In the 5th inning of a game against the Pawtucket Red Sox, Indianapolis players hit for a "Homer Cycle". Pete Rose Jr. opens the inning with a solo home run, Jason Williams connects for a 3–run shot, Glenn Murray slugs a grand slam, and Guillermo Garcia finishes the scoring with a 2–run blast. The Indians win the game 11–4.
- May 25 – Cleveland's David Bell becomes the third player in major league history to play against a team managed by his father. Bell's 2–run double brings home the go–ahead run in the Indians 7–4 win over Buddy Bell's Detroit Tigers. Bump Wills and Moisés Alou are the only other players to appear in games against their fathers (Maury Wills and Felipe Alou, respectively).
- May 28 – With Arizona leading the Giants, 8–6, in the bottom of the 9th with the bases loaded, manager Buck Showalter orders reliever Gregg Olson to intentionally walk Barry Bonds to bring home the Giants' 7th run. It is only the 4th bases–loaded intentional walk in major league history, and the first since Bill "Swish" Nicholson on July 23, 1944.

=== June ===
- June 6 – Hall of Fame second baseman Joe Morgan has his uniform number 8 retired by the Cincinnati Reds in a ceremony at Cinergy Field.
- June 7 – At Camden Yards, Hall of Famer Eddie Murray has his uniform number 33 retired by the Baltimore Orioles.
- June 10 :
  - Colorado's Dante Bichette becomes the first Rockies player ever to hit for the cycle and the first player to ever hit for the cycle in an interleague game in the team's 9–8, 10–inning victory over the Rangers.
  - New York Yankees outfielder Tim Raines steals the 800th base of his career in the Yankees 6–2 win over the Montreal Expos, his former team. Besides, Raines became the fifth player in Major League Baseball history to reach the milestone.
- June 15 – Sammy Sosa hits three home runs, helping the Chicago Cubs beat the Milwaukee Brewers 6–5.
- June 20 – The Cleveland Indians retire Bob Feller's uniform number 19 prior to the team's 5–3 loss to the Yankees.
- June 29 – Uniquely, no major league games are scheduled today: all 30 teams are off.
- June 30 – The Chicago Cubs' Sammy Sosa hits his 33rd home run of the season in a game against the Arizona Diamondbacks. Sosa's 20th home run in the month of June is a new MLB record for most home runs in one month.

=== July ===
- July 5 – Roger Clemens of the Toronto Blue Jays records his 3,000th career strikeout.
- July 7 – The American League defeats the National League 13–8, in the 69th All–Star Game at Coors Field in Denver, Colorado. Baltimore's Roberto Alomar is named the game's MVP, going 3–for–4 with a home run, one RBI, one stolen base and two runs scored.
- July 9 – Bud Selig is elected the 9th Commissioner of Baseball by a vote of club owners.
- July 17 – Rafael Palmeiro hits his 300th career home run, helping the Baltimore Orioles beat the Anaheim Angels 4–1.
- July 26 – Trevor Hoffman's bid to set a major league record with 42 straight saves ended when the San Diego closer gave up a home run to Moisés Alou on his first delivery in the ninth inning, tying the game. The Padres wound up beating Houston 5–4 in the 10th.

=== August ===
- August 4 – Toronto Blue Jays first baseman Carlos Delgado belted three home runs and drove in four runs, in an 11–9 defeat to the Texas Rangers at Arlington Stadium.
- August 9 – Dennis Martínez of the Atlanta Braves defeats the San Francisco Giants 7–5, for his 244th career victory, to set the record for most wins by a Latin American pitcher. Juan Marichal held the old mark. Chipper Jones backs Martínez' pitching with four hits and four RBIs.
- August 10 – At Qualcomm Stadium, the Wendelstedts become the first father and son duo to umpire in the same Major League game. Harry, umpiring in his final Major League season, serves as home plate umpire while his son Hunter, working in his first as a vacation substitute, serves as second base umpire in the Florida Marlins' 3–2 victory over the San Diego Padres.
- August 13 – Harold Baines of the Baltimore Orioles becomes the all–time leader in runs batted in by a designated hitter when he drives in his 824th career-RBI in a 7–4 win over the Cleveland Indians. Hal McRae was the previous record–holder.
- August 14 – Baltimore Orioles catcher Chris Hoiles becomes the ninth player — and first catcher — to hit two grand slams in a single game, doing so in a 15–3 win over the Cleveland Indians.
- August 23 :
  - San Francisco Giants outfielder Barry Bonds hits his 400th career home run off Florida Marlins pitcher Kirt Ojala, a solo shot in the third inning of a 10–5 victory of the Giants at Pro Player Stadium.
  - Andres Galarraga of the Atlanta Braves hits his 40th home run of the season, becoming the first player in history to hit 40 home runs in a season for two different teams in consecutive seasons (he hit 47 the previous season for the Colorado Rockies).
- August 25 – The Toronto Blue Jays' Roger Clemens strikes out 18 in a 3–0 victory over the Kansas City Royals. He becomes the first pitcher ever to record three games of 18 or more strikeouts. Clemens allows only three hits and does not walk a batter.
- August 31 – Oakland's Rickey Henderson scores the 2,000th run of his career in the Athletics' 15–6 loss to Cleveland. He joins Ty Cobb, Hank Aaron, Babe Ruth, Pete Rose and Willie Mays as the only players to reach the milestone.

=== September ===
- September 1 – St. Louis Cardinals first baseman Mark McGwire hits his 56th and 57th home runs of the season, breaking the National League record of 56 homers set by Hack Wilson in 1930.
- September 4 – The New York Yankees win their 100th game of the season, defeating the Chicago White Sox 11–6, reaching that mark five days faster than the 1906 Chicago Cubs and the 1954 Cleveland Indians.
- September 5 – Mark McGwire becomes the third player in major league history to reach 60 home runs, as the St. Louis Cardinals beat the Cincinnati Reds 7–0. Additionally, McGwire joins Babe Ruth and Roger Maris with 60 home runs in a single season.
- September 6 – Atlanta Braves outfielder Andruw Jones hits his 50th career home run in a 4–0 win over the New York Mets. At 21 age, Jones becomes the third–youngest player in major league history to reach that level. Only Mel Ott and Tony Conigliaro did so at a younger age.
- September 7 :
  - Mark McGwire hits his 61st home run of the season, tying Roger Maris' single-season home run record.
  - Ken Griffey Jr. hits his fiftieth home run of the season, joining Babe Ruth and Mark McGwire as the only players to hit 50 or more home runs in consecutive seasons.
- September 8 – Mark McGwire breaks Roger Maris' 37-year-old, 61-home run record, lining historic No. 62 just over the wall in left field with two outs in the fourth inning. McGwire's solo shot off the Chicago Cubs' Steve Trachsel—among the shortest he would hit all year—sets off a wild celebration at Busch Stadium. The Cubs' Sammy Sosa, who hit his 58th home run earlier in the game, is on the field to congratulate McGwire, creating an iconic image of the 1998 home run race. In the sixth inning of the same game, the Cardinals' J. D. Drew makes his major league debut pinch-hitting for pitcher Kent Mercker.
- September 11 – The Florida Marlins lose to the Atlanta Braves 8–2, to become the first World Series champion in history to lose 100 games the next season.
- September 15 – Ken Griffey Jr. hits homer #52 and drives in the 1,000th run of his career in the Mariners 12–7 win over the Twins. He becomes the fourth-youngest player in history to reach the milestone, after Mel Ott, Jimmie Foxx and Lou Gehrig. A day later, Griffey would collect his 20th stolen base of the season to become just the third player in major league history to record at least 50 homers and 20 steals in the same season; Willie Mays (1955) and Brady Anderson (1996) are the others.
- September 16 – Mike Piazza hits his 200th career home run helping the New York Mets beat the Houston Astros 4–3.
- September 17 – Denny Neagle puts the Atlanta Braves pitching staff into the baseball record books as he limits the Arizona Diamondbacks to four hits in six innings for a 1–0 win. Neagle improves to 15–11, making the Braves the first major league team with five 15-game winners since the 1930 Washington Senators. As a result, Neagle joins Tom Glavine, Greg Maddux, John Smoltz and Kevin Millwood.
- September 19 – Alex Rodriguez of the Seattle Mariners hits his 40th home run of the season and becomes the third player to join the 40–40 club. José Canseco (1988) and Barry Bonds (1996) are the others.
- September 20 – Cal Ripken Jr. of the Baltimore Orioles takes himself out of the lineup prior to the game with the New York Yankees to end his major league record consecutive game streak at 2,632. The Orioles lose the historic game by a score of 5–4. Ryan Minor, Ripken's replacement at third base, gets one hit in four at bats.
- September 21 – Jason Kendall of the Pittsburgh Pirates collects his 26th stolen base of the season to set a new National League record for catchers. The previous mark was set by John Stearns of the New York Mets in 1978.
- September 23 – At Milwaukee County Stadium, Sammy Sosa hits his 64th and 65th home runs as the Chicago Cubs jump out to a 7–0 lead against the Milwaukee Brewers. Nevertheless, the Brewers erase the deficit by scoring eight runs in the final three innings, the last three coming when Brant Brown drops a Geoff Jenkins fly ball with two out in the ninth inning. The error allows Mark Loretta, Jeff Cirillo and Jeromy Burnitz to score. The Cubs stay tied with the San Francisco Giants for the wildcard lead when they could have led by one game with three games left. Ironically, the error comes 90 years to the day of Merkle's Boner, which led to the Cubs ultimately winning the National League pennant and ultimately, their last World Series title until 2016.
- September 24 – Boston Red Sox pitcher Tom Gordon records his 42nd consecutive save of the year for a new major league mark as Boston defeats the Baltimore Orioles 9–6. Rod Beck and Trevor Hoffman shared the old mark.
- September 25 – Just hours after Sammy Sosa hits his league-leading 66th home run, pulling ahead of Mark McGwire for the first time all season, McGwire hits his 66th in a game against the Montreal Expos.
- September 26 :
  - Dennis Eckersley gets a standing ovation from the Fenway Park crowd as he appears in his 1,071st game, breaking Hoyt Wilhelm's record for most appearances by a pitcher.
  - The St. Louis Cardinals' Mark McGwire hits his 67th and 68th home runs against the Montreal Expos, pulling two ahead of the Chicago Cubs' Sammy Sosa, who goes 2-for-4 but fails to homer against the Houston Astros.
- September 27 :
  - The Cincinnati Reds defeat the Pittsburgh Pirates, 4–1. Cincinnati uses a pair of brothers in the infield: Bret Boone (2B) and his brother Aaron (3B), and Barry Larkin (SS) and his brother Stephen (1B).
  - In the St. Louis Cardinals' final game of the season, Mark McGwire hits two home runs against the Montreal Expos for the second straight day, establishing a new MLB record with 70 home runs in a season. Sammy Sosa fails to hit a home run in the Cubs' 4–3 loss to the Houston Astros, leaving him at 66 homers. However, the Cubs loss forces a one-game playoff with the San Francisco Giants for the National League wild card, giving Sosa one final chance to reach McGwire.
  - In the San Diego Padres' final regular season game, left fielder Greg Vaughn hits his 50th home run of the season, a career high and a San Diego Padres record for home runs in a season. This marks the first time in major league history that four players – Vaughn (50), Griffey (56), Sosa (66) and McGwire (70) – hit at least 50 home runs in the same season. Also during this game, Trevor Hoffman records his 53rd save of the season, tying the National League record set by the Cubs' Randy Myers in 1993.
  - The New York Yankees win their seventh-straight game, defeating the Tampa Bay Devil Rays 8–3. The Yankees finish the season with an American League record 114 wins.
  - In recording his first-ever Major League win, a 2–1 decision over the Detroit Tigers at the SkyDome, Roy Halladay of the Toronto Blue Jays, a week removed from his Major League debut, has what would have been the second no-hitter in Blue Jay history broken up by a Bobby Higginson home run with two out in the ninth, the only hit he will allow. The no-hitter also would have been the third to be pitched on the final day of a regular season, joining the combination of Vida Blue, Glenn Abbott, Paul Lindblad and Rollie Fingers in 1975 and Mike Witt's perfect game in 1984. The home run ball is caught, ironically, by former Blue Jays pitcher Dave Stieb, himself a three-time victim of a no-hitter being broken up with two out in the ninth inning. In his last start of the 1988 season, Stieb lost a perfect game bid, then, in 1989 lost a no-hitter. Finally, Stieb pitched the Blue Jays' only no-hitter to date in 1990.
- September 28 – In a one-game playoff, the Chicago Cubs defeat the San Francisco Giants 5–3 to secure the final playoff spot in the National League. For the third game in a row, the Cubs' Sammy Sosa gets two hits, but no home runs, leaving him at 66 home runs for the season; four fewer than Mark McGwire, who pulled ahead of Sosa with five home runs in his final three games.

=== October ===
- October 3 – The Atlanta Braves defeated the Chicago Cubs in the National League Division Series.
- October 21 – The New York Yankees win the World Series, sweeping the San Diego Padres in four straight games. Yankees third baseman Scott Brosius is named the Series MVP. New York end the season with a major league record 125 combined regular season and postseason wins.
- October 28 – U.S. President Bill Clinton signs the Curt Flood Act of 1998, named for former St. Louis Cardinals outfielder Curt Flood, who never played baseball again after refusing a trade to the Philadelphia Phillies and challenging the reserve clause. The act, passed by the 105th Congress and signed into law by President Clinton, revokes baseball's antitrust status (save for expansion, minor leagues, and franchise relocation), a status that major league baseball had enjoyed for seventy five years, after the Supreme Court had ruled that baseball was eligible for the status under interstate commerce.

=== November ===
- November 9 :
  - It is revealed that Hall of Fame pitcher Jim "Catfish" Hunter is suffering from amyotrophic lateral sclerosis, the progressive, ultimately fatal neurological condition better known as Lou Gehrig's disease. Hunter would die from the disease 10 months later at the age of 53.
  - Sensational Chicago Cubs flamethrower Kerry Wood was named the National League rookie of the year.
- November 11 – Larry Dierker, who led the Houston Astros to a team record 102 wins and a playoff appearance was named National League Manager of the Year.
- November 12 – In an unforgettable season, Joe Torre was named the American League Manager of the Year for the 2nd time in 3 years.
- November 17 – Tom Glavine of the Atlanta Braves wins his second National League Cy Young Award in an extremely close vote over two San Diego Padres pitchers: Trevor Hoffman and Kevin Brown. Glavine, who receives 11 first-place votes to Hoffman's 13 (Brown receives the remaining 8), becomes the first National League pitcher since the league instituted its four-vote system in 1970 to win the award despite receiving fewer first-place votes than another player. Glavine tallied 99 points (Hoffman – 88, Brown – 76), with 5 points being awarded for each first place vote, 3 for each second-place vote, 2 for third, and 1 for fourth. Another oddity is the fact that Hoffman, Brown, and Rod Beck (who did not receive a single point in the Cy Young Award voting) finished higher than Glavine in the MVP voting, despite Glavine's Braves finishing with the best record in the National League.
- November 30 – The Arizona Diamondbacks sign free agent pitcher Randy Johnson to a four-year contract worth approximately $50 million.

=== December ===
- December 12 – The Los Angeles Dodgers set the salary bar higher by signing free agent pitcher Kevin Brown to a seven-year, $105 million contract, the largest in the majors.

== Movies ==
- Babe Ruth (TV)
- BASEketball
- Life and Times of Hank Greenberg, The
- Major League: Back to the Minors

== Births ==
=== January ===
- January 2 – Kyle Stowers
- January 3 – José Suárez
- January 5 – Paxton Schultz
- January 7 – Dermis García
- January 7 – Blake Sabol
- January 8 – Jhoan Durán
- January 8 – Kameron Misner
- January 8 – Ken Waldichuk
- January 9 – Alek Manoah
- January 9 – Edwin Uceta
- January 10 – Oscar González
- January 10 – Jack Little
- January 14 – Sam Huff
- January 14 – Kevin Vicuna
- January 15 – Bailey Horn
- January 15 – Drew Millas
- January 16 – Duke Ellis
- January 19 – Brandon Eisert
- January 22 – Austin Shenton
- January 23 – Yosver Zulueta
- January 27 – Christian Koss
- January 27 – John McMillon
- January 27 – Tyler Tolbert
- January 28 – Matt Manning
- January 31 – Kyle Backhus

=== February ===
- February 1 – Jazz Chisholm Jr.
- February 1 – Ryne Nelson
- February 2 – Will Brennan
- February 2 – Josh Lowe
- February 4 – George Kirby
- February 5 – Nick Lodolo
- February 5 – Edgar Navarro
- February 6 – Anthony Maldonado
- February 6 – Adley Rutschman
- February 8 – Jared Triolo
- February 9 – Vidal Bruján
- February 11 – Graham Ashcraft
- February 12 – Josh Jung
- February 13 – Erik Miller
- February 17 – Jhony Brito
- February 18 – Cade Gibson
- February 19 – Rodolfo Durán
- February 19 – Juan Yepez
- February 20 – Mason Thompson
- February 20 – Keaton Winn
- February 22 – Cody Bradford
- February 23 – Caleb Freeman
- February 23 – Ryan Ward
- February 24 – Zak Kent
- February 28 – Ryan Zeferjahn

=== March ===
- March 2 – Johan Oviedo
- March 4 – Alex Speas
- March 5 – Bo Bichette
- March 5 – Orlando Ribalta
- March 6 – Sandro Fabian
- March 7 – Greg Jones
- March 9 – Anderson Espinoza
- March 10 – Maverick Handley
- March 11 – Jacob Lopez
- March 18 – Emmanuel Clase
- March 19 – José Butto
- March 19 – Riley Martin
- March 22 – Michael Massey
- March 26 – Eric Yang
- March 31 – Cam Eden
- March 31 – Elvin Rodríguez

=== April ===
- April 2 – Brandon Williamson
- April 3 – Humberto Castellanos
- April 3 – Andrew Vaughn
- April 5 – Beau Brieske
- April 5 – José García
- April 9 – Hunter Gaddis
- April 13 – Edward Cabrera
- April 14 – Walter Pennington
- April 16 – Matt Mervis
- April 19 – Sean Reynolds
- April 21 – A. J. Alexy
- April 29 – Joe LaSorsa
- April 30 – Darius Vines

=== May ===
- May 1 – Anderson Tejeda
- May 1 – Miguel Yajure
- May 2 – Ian Anderson
- May 4 – Yonny Hernández
- May 5 – Eduardo Salazar
- May 6 – Mitch Spence
- May 7 – Nolan Jones
- May 9 – Tatsuya Imai
- May 10 – Cody Laweryson
- May 10 – Sammy Peralta
- May 12 – Matt Brash
- May 13 – Mickey Moniak
- May 14 – Brenton Doyle
- May 14 – Alec Marsh
- May 22 – Andre Lipcius
- May 22 – Carson McCusker
- May 23 – Jonathan Aranda
- May 23 – Luis Frías
- May 24 – Aaron Ashby
- May 25 – Carson Ragsdale
- May 28 – Pedro León
- May 28 – Huascar Ynoa
- May 29 – Brenan Hanifee
- May 29 – TJ Shook
- May 29 – Connor Thomas
- May 30 – Kyle Hurt

=== June ===
- June 3 – Luis Gil
- June 5 – Chris Murphy
- June 6 – Dylan Dodd
- June 9 – Luis De Los Santos
- June 9 – Bubba Thompson
- June 10 – Cole Waites
- June 11 – Ryan Fernandez
- June 12 – Hunter Bigge
- June 15 – Garrett Acton
- June 16 – Will Benson
- June 16 – Alek Jacob
- June 19 – Cody Bolton
- June 24 – Brett Harris
- June 26 – Khalil Lee
- June 28 – Josh Winckowski
- June 29 – José Miranda
- June 30 – Brendan Cellucci

=== July ===
- July 2 – Nathan Wiles
- July 5 – Trei Cruz
- July 7 – Evan Justice
- July 10 – Jonny DeLuca
- July 11 – Samad Taylor
- July 12 – Kenny Piper
- July 14 – Joey Ortiz
- July 16 – Nick Robertson
- July 20 – Chris Rodriguez
- July 20 – Keibert Ruiz
- July 21 – Will Wilson
- July 25 – Korey Lee
- July 27 – Xzavion Curry
- July 27 – Jeter Downs
- July 29 – Sixto Sánchez
- July 29 – Jack Suwinski
- July 29 – Will Wagner

=== August ===
- August 3 – Jonathan Araúz
- August 3 – Jared Shuster
- August 5 – Tobias Myers
- August 6 – Woo-suk Go
- August 12 – Joan Adon
- August 13 – Chase Lee
- August 14 – Cade Cavalli
- August 14 – Chad Patrick
- August 15 – Jordan Leasure
- August 16 – Akil Baddoo
- August 16 – Michael Toglia
- August 17 – Elehuris Montero
- August 17 – River Ryan
- August 17 – Yoshinobu Yamamoto
- August 18 – Zach DeLoach
- August 18 – Andrew Nardi
- August 19 – Jake Palisch
- August 19 – Brandon Young
- August 20 – Jung-hoo Lee
- August 20 – Noah Murdock
- August 21 – Amos Willingham
- August 22 – Chayce McDermott
- August 23 – Bryce Miller
- August 24 – Mason Miller
- August 24 – McKinley Moore
- August 26 – Brusdar Graterol
- August 29 – Hunter Brown

=== September ===
- September 3 – Jacob Amaya
- September 4 – Andrés Giménez
- September 4 – Garrett Mitchell
- September 5 – Logan Allen
- September 5 – Blake Dunn
- September 6 – Brant Hurter
- September 8 – Blas Castano
- September 8 – Leody Taveras
- September 10 – Landen Roupp
- September 13 – Gerardo Carrillo
- September 15 – Hans Crouse
- September 15 – CJ Van Eyk
- September 17 – Jordan Balazovic
- September 17 – Oscar Colás
- September 17 – Dillon Dingler
- September 17 – Pedro Pagés
- September 18 – Andre Pallante
- September 19 – DL Hall
- September 19 – Seth Johnson
- September 21 – Yainer Díaz
- September 25 – Nick Loftin
- September 28 – Shay Whitcomb
- September 29 – Luis Campusano
- September 30 – Hagen Danner

=== October ===
- October 1 – Otto López
- October 3 – Tyler Davis
- October 4 – Oneil Cruz
- October 5 – Buddy Kennedy
- October 6 – Brendan Beck
- October 6 – Nick Pratto
- October 7 – Seth Lonsway
- October 7 – Bob Seymour
- October 8 – Nick Allen
- October 9 – Clayton Beeter
- October 9 – Jake Eder
- October 10 – Guillermo Zuñiga
- October 11 – Ivan Johnson
- October 13 – Ricky Vanasco
- October 15 – Brandon Pfaadt
- October 15 – Gavin Stone
- October 18 – Nick Frasso
- October 20 – José Soriano
- October 23 – Dylan Carlson
- October 25 – Juan Soto
- October 26 – Austin Pope
- October 27 – Niko Kavadas
- October 28 – Spencer Strider

=== November ===
- November 1 – Jeremiah Estrada
- November 3 – Randy Vásquez
- November 4 – Jack Winkler
- November 6 – Alejandro Kirk
- November 10 – Blake Hunt
- November 16 – Sebastian Rivero
- November 18 – Brendan White
- November 19 – Cristian Pache
- November 20 – Mario Feliciano
- November 21 – Nick Davila
- November 24 – Freddy Tarnok
- November 25 – Alec Burleson
- November 26 – Carlos Narváez
- November 26 – Robinson Piña
- November 27 – Bryan Lavastida
- November 29 – Raymond Burgos
- November 29 – MJ Melendez

=== December ===
- December 1 – Kai-Wei Teng
- December 9 – Braxton Fulford
- December 13 – Ian Seymour
- December 16 – Carson Seymour
- December 17 – Alex Hoppe
- December 20 – Colton Gordon
- December 26 – Nelson Velázquez
- December 27 – Tim Elko
- December 27 – Simón Muzziotti
- December 28 – Enmanuel Valdez
- December 29 – William Woods
- December 30 – Drew Waters

== Deaths ==
=== January ===
- January 3 – Wayne Ambler, 82, middle infielder who played from 1937 through 1939 for the Philadelphia Athletics, whose baseball career was interrupted by wartime service in the armed forces.
- January 6 – Ronny Miller, 79, pitcher who appeared in one game for the 1941 Washington Senators before joining military service during World War II.
- January 7 – Hiker Moran, 86, pitcher for the Boston Bees in the 1938 and 1939 seasons.
- January 11 – Joe Becker, 89, catcher for the Cleveland Indians from 1936 to 1937, later a pitching coach for the Brooklyn/Los Angeles Dodgers (1955–1964), St. Louis Cardinals (1965–1966) and Chicago Cubs (1967–1970); his Dodger pitchers contributed to three World Series titles (1955, 1959, 1963).
- January 29 – Anna Mae Hutchison, 72, two-time All-Star pitcher who posted several all-time and single-season records in the All-American Girls Professional Baseball League.
- January 30 – Lucille Colacito, 76, All-American Girls Professional Baseball League catcher for the Kenosha Comets from 1944 through 1945.

=== February ===
- February 5 – Marv Olson, 90, second baseman who played in the early 1930s for the Boston Red Sox.
- February 8 – Betty Foss, 68, All-Star infielder and two-time champion bat in the All-American Girls Professional Baseball League.
- February 9 – Bill Froats, 67, pitcher who played for the Detroit Tigers in the 1955 season.
- February 11 – Mike Fornieles, 66, Cuban All-Star relief pitcher who played from 1952 through 1963 for five teams, spending just over half his 12-year career with the Boston Red Sox, where he achieved his greatest success, including the 1960 season in which he tied for the American League lead in saves, led in games pitched, and won the inaugural Sporting News Fireman of the Year Award.
- February 18 – Harry Caray, 83, beloved and much-parodied broadcaster for the St. Louis Cardinals, Oakland A's, Chicago White Sox and Chicago Cubs since 1945; winner, Ford C. Frick Award (1989), elected to National Radio Hall of Fame (1990).
- February 23 – Ray Stoviak, 82, backup outfielder in 10 games for the 1938 Philadelphia Phillies.
- February 25 – Joe Gallagher, 83, outfielder who played in 165 games in 1939 and 1940 for the New York Yankees, St. Louis Browns and Brooklyn Dodgers.
- February 27 – Carlos Ascanio, 79, steady first baseman for the 1946 New York Black Yankees, who is regarded as the only Venezuelan ballplayer to perform in the Negro leagues.

=== March ===
- March 5 – Slick Castleman, 84, pitcher who played from 1934 through 1939 for the New York Giants, including the National League Champion team that lost to the New York Yankees in six games in the 1936 World Series.
- March 6 – Frank Barrett, 84, reliever who saw most of his work in the majors during World War II, while pitching sporadically during 12 seasons for the St. Louis Cardinals (1939), Boston Red Sox (1944–1945), Boston Braves (1946) and Pittsburgh Pirates (1950).
- March 10 – Ed Walczak, 82, second baseman who played briefly for the Philadelphia Phillies during the 1945 season.
- March 17 – Milo Candini, 80, pitcher who played for the Washington Senators in all or part of eight seasons spanning 1943–1949, before joining the Philadelphia Phillies "Whiz Kids" in 1950 and 1951.
- March 23 – Gentry Jessup, 83, pitcher in the Negro leagues from 1940 to 1948.
- March 23 – Ray Scott, 78, celebrated NFL television play-by-play announcer who also made his mark in baseball; TV/radio voice of Minnesota Twins from 1961 to 1968, then part-time from 1973 to 1975; also called games for 1970–1971 Washington Senators and 1976–1977 Milwaukee Brewers.
- March 29 – Dick Phillips, 66, first baseman for the San Francisco Giants and Washington Senators over four seasons spanning 1962 and 1966; Pacific Coast League MVP (1961); later coached for San Diego Padres (1980), scouted for the Pittsburgh Pirates, and managed in the minor-league systems of the Padres, Minnesota Twins and Milwaukee Brewers.

=== April ===
- April 1 – Dave Smith, 83, pitcher who played from 1938 to 1939 with the Philadelphia Athletics.
- April 6 – Dewey Soriano, 78, former minor-league pitcher turned executive; president of the Pacific Coast League (1959–1968), then president/minority owner of the expansion Seattle Pilots in 1969, their only season in MLB before bankruptcy forced their sale to Bud Selig, who moved them to Milwaukee as the Brewers in 1970.
- April 6 – John Wyatt, 62, All-Star pitcher who played nine seasons for five American League clubs, including Boston Red Sox during their 1967 World Series season, when he was the winning pitcher in Game 6.
- April 11 – Doris Tetzlaff, 77, infielder and coach during ten seasons in the All-American Girls Professional Baseball League.
- April 13 – Jack Bolling, 81, first baseman who played with the 1939 Philadelphia Phillies and the 1944 Brooklyn Dodgers.
- April 13 – Randy Brown, 54, backup catcher for the California Angels in the 1969 and 1970 seasons.
- April 18 – Walter Sessi, 79, outfielder for the St. Louis Cardinals in the 1941 and 1946 seasons, one of many players who missed many years of his career due to serving in the military during World War II.
- April 26 – Gabe Paul, 88, longtime baseball executive; general manager of the Cincinnati Reds (1951–1960), Houston Colt .45s (1960–1961), Cleveland Indians (1961–1969 and 1971–1973) and New York Yankees (1974–1977); part-owner and club president of Indians (1962–1973) and Yankees (1973–1977), returning to Indians as club president (1978–1984).
- April 27 – John Irvin Kennedy, 71, infielder; first African American player in Philadelphia Phillies history when he made his debut on April 22, 1957.
- April 29 – Ron Blackburn, 63, pitcher for the Pittsburgh Pirates during the 1958 and 1959 seasons.

=== May ===
- May 1 – Heinie Heltzel, 84, third baseman who played from 1943 to 1944 for the Boston Braves and Philadelphia Phillies.
- May 2 – Johnny Grodzicki, 81, pitcher who debuted for the St. Louis Cardinals in 1941, then missed four seasons (1942 to 1945) serving as a paratrooper in the U.S. Army during World War II, where he was wounded in action behind enemy lines; after surgery and rehabilitation, returned to the Cardinals and appeared in 19 MLB games in 1946 and 1947; later, a longtime scout and pitching instructor.
- May 4 – Sam Gentile, 81, outfielder who played for the Boston Braves during its 1943 season.
- May 9 – Ray Noble, 79, Cuban catcher who spent 14 seasons in the Minor and Negro leagues between 1945 and 1961, as well as three seasons with the New York Giants from 1951 to 1953.
- May 14 – Bill Sodd, 83, pinch hitter who appeared in just one game for the Cleveland Indians in the 1937 season.
- May 15 – Packy Rogers, 85, infielder who appeared in 23 games for the 1938 Brooklyn Dodgers and later managed in the Minor Leagues and scouted for the Minnesota Twins.
- May 16 – Rufino Linares, 47, Dominican left fielder for the Atlanta Braves (1981–1982, 1984) who hit .298 in 77 games for the 1982 division champion team; also played for California Angels (1985).
- May 22 – Fred Hatfield, 73, third baseman and utility infielder who appeared in 722 games from 1950 to 1958 for five teams, primarily the Detroit Tigers, Chicago White Sox and Boston Red Sox; later a Detroit coach.
- May 26 – Charlie White, 70, catcher who spent 16 years in baseball between 1950 and 1966, including 62 games over two seasons with the 1954–1955 Milwaukee Braves.

=== June ===
- June 4 – Shirley Povich, 92, sportswriter for The Washington Post since 1924.
- June 7 – Tom Buskey, 51, relief pitcher who played from 1973 through 1980 for the New York Yankees, Cleveland Indians and Toronto Blue Jays.
- June 10 – Jim Hearn, 77, All-Star pitcher for the St. Louis Cardinals and New York Giants who won 17 games for New York's 1951 pennant winners.
- June 11 – Harry Anderson, 66, outfielder and first baseman for the Philadelphia Phillies and Cincinnati Reds from 1957 to 1961.
- June 21 – Al Campanis, 81, general manager of the Los Angeles Dodgers from November 1968 to April 1987, previously a second baseman (1943), scout (1951–1957) and scouting director (1958–1968) for the organization; during his GM term, Dodgers won four NL pennants and 1981 World Series title; fired after making racially controversial remarks during a 1987 Nightline interview; as of 2026, the only MLB player to have been born in Greece.

=== July ===
- July 1 – Ed Connolly, 58, southpaw who pitched in the 1960s for the Boston Red Sox and Cleveland Indians; son of 1930s catcher Ed Sr.
- July 2 – Leon Brinkopf, 71, shortstop for the 1952 Chicago Cubs.
- July 6 – Ed Sanicki, 74, outfielder in 20 games for the Philadelphia Phillies in 1949 and 1951, who in his first Major League at-bat hit a three-run home run off Rip Sewell of the Pittsburgh Pirates.
- July 13 – Red Badgro, 95, outfielder who appeared in 143 MLB games with 1929–1930 St. Louis Browns; also an NFL Hall of Fame end who played for three teams between 1927 and 1936.
- July 16 – Jess Dobernic, 80, pitcher who played for the Chicago White Sox, Chicago Cubs and Cincinnati Reds in part of three seasons between 1939 and 1949, whose baseball career was interrupted because of his military service during World War II.
- July 19 – Elmer Valo, 77, Slovak-born right fielder who batted .300 five times for the Philadelphia/Kansas City Athletics; ace pinch hitter for Athletics and five other clubs; later worked as an MLB coach and minor league manager and scout.
- July 22 – Don Dunphy, 90, New York City sports announcer known nationally for boxing commentary; lead announcer for the Yankees and baseball Giants in 1944 during Mel Allen's World War II military service.
- July 27 – Bill Tuttle, 69, center fielder and third baseman for three American League teams between 1952 and 1963, who batted .300 for the 1959 Kansas City Athletics.

=== August ===
- August 3 – Bob Starr, 65, sportscaster and play-by-play announcer on radio or television for the St. Louis Cardinals, California Angels and Boston Red Sox between 1972 and 1997.
- August 6 – Jack Brickhouse, 82, broadcaster for the Chicago Cubs from 1941 through 1981, as well with the Chicago White Sox for over 20 years.
- August 9 – Ray Moss, 96, pitcher who played from 1926 to 1931 with the Brooklyn Robins and Boston Braves.
- August 13 – Rafael Robles, 50, Dominican Republic shortstop best known as the first player to come to bat in San Diego Padres history, for whom he played in parts of three seasons between 1969 and 1972.
- August 17 – Johnny Lipon, 75, shortstop for the Detroit Tigers and three other MLB teams (1942, 1946 and 1948–1954), who scored 104 runs in the 1950 season; manager of Cleveland Indians from July 30, 1971 through end of the season; spent three decades as a manager in the minor leagues.
- August 17 – Jim Murray, 79, sportswriter for the Los Angeles Times from 1961 to 1998, who earned a Pulitzer Prize and was named the nation's best sportswriter 14 times.
- August 20 – Gene Host, 65, pitcher for the Detroit Tigers in 1956 and the Kansas City Athletics in 1957.
- August 20 – Fred Sington, 88, outfielder who played from 1934 to 1939 for the Washington Senators and Brooklyn Dodgers.
- August 22 – Minoru Murayama, 61, Hall of Fame NPB pitcher and manager who played for the Osaka Tigers/Hanshin Tigers from 1959 to 1972 and managed them from 1970 to 1972 and again from 1988 to 1989.

=== September ===
- September 7 – Earl Harrist, 79, pitcher with the Cincinnati Reds, Chicago White Sox, Washington Senators, St. Louis Browns and the Detroit Tigers in five seasons between 1945 and 1953.
- September 9 – Jerry Zimmerman, 63, catcher who played in 483 games, mostly as a backup, for the Cincinnati Reds and Minnesota Twins from 1961 to 1968, then a coach for the Montreal Expos and Twins for 12 more seasons.
- September 11 – Larry Bradford, 48, pitcher for the Atlanta Braves during three seasons between 1977 and 1981.
- September 17 – Slim Emmerich, 78, pitcher for the New York Giants from 1945 to 1946.
- September 17 – Chet Hoff, 107, pitcher for the New York Highlanders and St. Louis Browns, who became the longest-lived major league player.
- September 22 – Billy Williams, 68, National League umpire from August 14, 1963 to June 29, 1987, when a broken leg ended his career; worked in 3,432 league games, four NL Championship Series, three World Series and three All-Star games.
- September 30 – Dan Quisenberry, 45, three-time All-Star relief pitcher who, as a Kansas City Royal (1979–1988), led American League in saves a record five times; posted first 40-save season in history, and held AL career record from 1987 to 1992; twice a Cy Young Award runner-up and member of 1985 World Series champions who finished career with St. Louis Cardinals (1988–1989) and San Francisco Giants (1990).

=== October ===
- October 2 – Gene Autry, 91, owner of the Angels since their formation in 1961 who hoped in vain for the team's first pennant, watching the team fall achingly short three times.
- October 4 – Lee Grissom, 90, All-Star pitcher who played from 1934 through 1941 for the Cincinnati Reds, New York Yankees, Brooklyn Dodgers and Philadelphia Phillies; brother of Marv Grissom.
- October 6 – Mark Belanger, 54, All-Star shortstop and eight-time Gold Glove winner for the Baltimore Orioles, and later a players' union official.
- October 10 – Strick Shofner, 79, third baseman for the 1947 Boston Red Sox.
- October 10 – El Tappe, 71, backup catcher who appeared in 145 games for the Chicago Cubs between 1954 and 1962, coached for them between 1959 and 1965, and served as "head coach" during their College of Coaches experiment for parts of 1961 and 1962.
- October 16 – Frank Carswell, 78, outfielder for the 1953 Detroit Tigers and prodigious minor-league slugger; later a successful minor league manager and Tiger scout; enshrined in the International League Hall of Fame.
- October 21 – Phil Haugstad, 74, pitcher for the Brooklyn Dodgers and Cincinnati Reds between 1947 and 1952.
- October 30 – George Schmees, 74, first baseman/outfielder/pitcher for the St. Louis Browns and Boston Red Sox in 1952.
- October 31 – Bob Thurman, 81, slugging outfielder in the Caribbean and Negro leagues between the mid-1940s and early 1950s, and from 1956 through 1959, at the end of his career, in majors with the Cincinnati Redlegs.

=== November ===
- November 2 – Elmo Plaskett, 60, catcher and native of U.S. Virgin Islands who played for the Pittsburgh Pirates in 1962 and 1963.
- November 10 – Hal Newhouser, 77, Hall of Fame pitcher for the Detroit Tigers who won back-to-back MVP awards in 1944 and 1945, while topping the American League in wins four times as well as in ERA and strikeouts twice each, and leading Detroit to Game 7 victory over the Chicago Cubs in the 1945 World Series.
- November 13 – Al Wright, 86, second baseman for the 1933 Boston Braves.
- November 20 – George Brophy, 72, Minnesota Twins executive from the team's relocation to Minneapolis–Saint Paul in 1961 through 1985; as assistant farm system director (through 1969) and farm director (1969–1985), he helped develop key players for the Twins' 1987 and 1991 World Series champions.
- November 20 – Dick Sisler, 78, All-Star first baseman and left fielder for three National League teams, whose closing day home run brought the Philadelphia Phillies the 1950 pennant; member of 1946 World Series champion St. Louis Cardinals; later acting manager (1964) and manager (1965) of Cincinnati Reds; longtime batting coach; son of Hall-of-Famer George Sisler whose brother Dave also played in the majors.
- November 23 – Bob Betts, 70, public announcer at Milwaukee County Stadium for 23 seasons
- November 28 – M. Donald Grant, 94, Canadian native and Wall Street stockbroker; chairman and minority owner of the New York Mets from their 1961 founding to 1978.
- November 29 – Jim Turner, 95, All-Star pitcher from 1937 through 1945 for the Boston Bees, Cincinnati Reds and New York Yankees; pitching coach of Yankees (1949–1959 and 1966–1973) and Reds (1961–1965); member of eight World Series champions.
- November 30 – Jesse Levan, 72, third baseman and outfielder for the Philadelphia Phillies in 1947 and the Washington Senators from 1954 to 1955, who bounced around in the minor leagues, where he won three batting titles; suspended for life on July 3, 1959, for failing to report his association with gamblers.
- November 30 – Ad Liska, 92, pitcher for the Washington Senators and Philadelphia Phillies from 1929 to 1933, who later went on to play 14 seasons for the Triple-A Portland Beavers, winning 15 or more games nine times.

=== December ===
- December 2 – Ben Guintini, 79, backup outfielder for the Pittsburgh Pirates in 1946 and the Philadelphia Athletics in 1950 who played a total of five games in the majors.
- December 2 – Red Roberts, 80, backup infielder for the 1943 Washington Senators.
- December 15 – Johnny Riddle, 93, catcher, manager and coach with unusual 33-year career; played from 1927 through 1930 in the minors, then with five MLB teams in parts of seven seasons between 1930–1948; in between, spent all or parts of three seasons as a player-manager in the minors (1942–1944); later worked for 101/2 years as a coach in the National League for five teams between 1948 and 1959; won a World Series ring as first base coach of 1957 Milwaukee Braves; brother of Elmer Riddle.
- December 16 - Johnny Gorsica, 83, pitcher for the Detroit Tigers during seven seasons between 1940 and 1947, also a member of the 1940 American League champion team who served in the United States Navy during World War II and missed the 1945 baseball season, when the Tigers won the World Series championship.
- December 18 – Denny Galehouse, 87, pitcher who won 109 games with the Cleveland Indians, Boston Red Sox and St. Louis Browns in a span of 15 seasons from 1934 to 1949; Red Sox' surprise starting pitcher in 1948 American League tie-breaker game who was routed by the Lou Boudreau's Indians, paving the way for Cleveland's 1948 World Series title.
- December 19 – Joe Mack, 86, first baseman for the 1945 Boston Braves.
- December 20 – John Anderson, 69, pitcher who played for the Philadelphia Phillies, Baltimore Orioles, St. Louis Cardinals and Houston Colt .45's in three seasons between 1958 and 1962.
- December 26 – Dewey Adkins, 80, pitcher for the Washington Senators and Chicago Cubs in part of three seasons between 1942 and 1949.
- December 30 – Jack Graham, 82, backup first baseman and right fielder who played in 239 games for the Brooklyn Dodgers, New York Giants and St. Louis Browns in 1946 and 1949; son of Peaches Graham.
