= Canizaro =

Canizaro may refer to:

- Jay Canizaro (born 1973), American athlete
- Joseph C. Canizaro (1937–2025), American philanthropist
