= List of most watched United States television broadcasts of 2001 =

The following is a list of most watched United States television broadcasts of 2001.

== Most watched by week ==
Broadcast (primetime only)
Week of	Title	Network	Viewers (in millions)	Ref.
January 1	ER	NBC	30.41	
January 8	ER	NBC	28.35	
January 15	58th Golden Globe Awards	NBC	22.49	
January 22	Super Bowl XXXV	CBS	84.34	
January 29	Survivor	CBS	29.04	
February 5	Survivor	CBS	29.04	
February 12	Survivor	CBS	28.23	
February 19	Survivor	CBS	28.78	
February 26	Survivor	CBS	31.32	
March 5	Survivor	CBS	28.72	
March 12	Survivor	CBS	28.46	
March 19	73rd Academy Awards	ABC	42.94	
March 26	Survivor	CBS	28.12	
April 2	Survivor	CBS	27.72	
April 9	Survivor	CBS	27.55	
April 16	Survivor	CBS	28.42	
April 23	Survivor	CBS	26.89	
April 29	Survivor	CBS	36.35	
May 7	ER	NBC	23.17	
May 14	ER	NBC	30.72	
May 21	Everybody Loves Raymond	CBS	20.13	
May 28	60 Minutes	CBS	14.86	
June 4	NBA Finals (Game 3)	NBC	20.28	
June 11	NBA Finals (Game 4)	NBC	19.98	
June 18	Who Wants to Be a Millionaire (Thurs)	ABC	14.06	
June 25	Who Wants to Be a Millionaire (Thurs)	ABC	13.71	
July 2	Who Wants to Be a Millionaire (Sun)	ABC	13.37	
July 9	2001 MLB All-Star Game	Fox	16.03	
July 16	Who Wants to Be a Millionaire (Tues)	ABC	13.94	
July 23	Fear Factor	NBC	14.12	
July 30	Fear Factor	NBC	15.41	
August 6	Who Wants to Be a Millionaire (Sun)	ABC	13.45	
August 13	Who Wants to Be a Millionaire (Sun)	ABC	13.28	
August 20	Primetime Thursday	ABC	23.70	
August 27	Who Wants to Be a Millionaire (Tues)	ABC	13.63	
September 3	Who Wants to Be a Millionaire (Fri)	ABC	13.61	
September 10	Unreleased			
September 17	Presidential Address analysis (Thurs)	NBC	23.87	
September 24	Friends	NBC	31.70	
October 1	Friends	NBC	30.04	
October 8	Friends	NBC	29.20	
October 15	ER	NBC	26.71	
October 22	ER	NBC	27.38	
October 29	World Series (Game 7)	Fox	39.08	
November 5	ER	NBC	26.85	
November 12	ER	NBC	27.37	
November 19	Friends	NBC	24.24	
November 26	The Carol Burnett Show: Show Stoppers	CBS	29.80	
December 3	CSI: Crime Scene Investigation	CBS	23.96	
December 10	ER	NBC	28.87	
December 17	CSI: Crime Scene Investigation	CBS	23.67	
December 24	CSI: Crime Scene Investigation	CBS	19.18	
December 31	Patriots vs. Panthers (NFL) post-game show	CBS	22.56	
