= 1998 Junior League World Series =

Tournament information
- Location: Taylor, Michigan
- Dates: August 17–22

Final positions
- Champions: Mission Viejo, California
- Runner-up: Waco, Texas

The 1998 Junior League World Series took place from August 17–22 in Taylor, Michigan, United States. Mission Viejo, California defeated Waco, Texas twice in the championship game.

== Teams ==
| United States | International |
|---|---|
| Fort Wayne, Indiana; Georgetown; Central | Surrey, British Columbia; Whalley; Canada |
| Meriden, Connecticut; Ed Walsh; East | Ramstein, Germany; Ramstein; Europe |
| Waco, Texas; Midway; South | Guadalupe, Nuevo León; Linda Vista; Mexico |
| Mission Viejo, California; South Mission Viejo; West | Arroyo, Puerto Rico; Hermanos Cruz; Puerto Rico |

== Results ==
Upper round 1 | Upper round 2 | Upper final | World Championship
— | Canada | 11
— | Germany | 0
1–0 | Canada | 3
1–0 | Connecticut | 1
— | Connecticut | 6
— | Puerto Rico | 4
2–0 | Canada | 4
2–0 | Texas | 8
— | Indiana | 1
— | Mexico | 7
1–0 | Mexico | 3
1–0 | Texas | 6
— | California | 0
— | Texas | 3 | 3–0 | Texas | 2 | 6
4–1 | California | 6 | 9
Lower round 1 | Lower round 2 | Lower round 3 | Lower final
1–1 | Puerto Rico | 7
0–1 | Germany | 3 | 1–1 | Mexico | 8 | 2–1 | Canada | 1
0–1 | Puerto Rico | 7 | 2–1 | Mexico | 0 | 3–1 | California | 3
2–1 | California | 5
1–1 | California | 9
0–1 | Indiana | 2 | 1–1 | Connecticut | 2
0–1 | California | 5

1998 Junior League World Series Champions
South Mission Viejo LL
Mission Viejo, California
