= John Barnes (outfielder) =

American baseball player (born 1976)

- Outfielder
- Born: April 24, 1976 (age 48); San Diego, California, U.S.
- Batted: Right Threw: Right

MLB debut
- September 16, 2000, for the Minnesota Twins

Last MLB appearance
- August 26, 2001, for the Minnesota Twins

MLB statistics
- Batting average: .241
- Home runs: 0
- Runs batted in: 2
- Stats at Baseball Reference

Teams
- Minnesota Twins (2000–2001)

John Delbert Barnes (born April 24, 1976) is an American former professional baseball outfielder. Barnes is a graduate of Granite Hills High School and attended Grossmont College in El Cajon, California

== Career ==
Barnes was selected in the fourth round of the 1996 Major League Baseball draft by the Boston Red Sox. In 1998, he was traded, along with Joe Thomas and Matt Kinney, to the Minnesota Twins for Greg Swindell and Orlando Merced. He achieved his best minor league season in 2000 with the Twins' Triple-A affiliate in Salt Lake City, winning the Pacific Coast League batting crown with a .365 average along with a 1.004 OPS, 56 extra base hits and 87 RBI. The performance earned him his first promotion to the major leagues, where he batted .351 with an .874 OPS in limited action for the Twins.

His numbers in Triple-A tailed off in 2001, and after a meager .048 average in 23 plate appearances with the 2001 Twins, he was placed on waivers and claimed by the Colorado Rockies. Barnes became a minor league nomad from there, spending the entire 2002 season with the Rockies' Triple-A Colorado Springs Sky Sox, 2003, with the Pittsburgh Pirates Triple-A Nashville Sounds. and 2004 in the Los Angeles Dodgers system with the Gulf Coast Dodgers and Las Vegas 51s.

In 2005, Barnes played with the Atlanta Braves organization with the Mississippi Braves and the Richmond Braves, his last season as a position player. In 2006 he returned to the Red Sox organization and was converted to a knuckleball pitcher. Between 2006 and 2007, he worked his way up from Boston's Gulf Coast League team to their Triple-A team in Pawtucket, but was granted free agency at 2007's end and has not played professionally since.
