= Ryan Tatusko =

American baseball player (born 1985)

- Pitcher
- Born: March 27, 1985 (age 41); Merrillville, Indiana, U.S.
- Batted: Right Threw: Right

KBO debut
- June 26, 2014, for the Hanwha Eagles

Last KBO appearance
- October 10, 2014, for the Hanwha Eagles

KBO statistics
- Win–loss record: 2–6
- Earned run average: 7.07
- Strikeouts: 49
- Stats at Baseball Reference

Teams
- Hanwha Eagles (2014)

Ryan P. Tatusko (born March 27, 1985) is an American former professional baseball pitcher. He in the KBO League for the Hanwha Eagles in 2014.

== Professional career ==
=== Texas Rangers ===
Tatusko was the Texas Rangers' eighteenth-round pick in the 2007 Major League Baseball draft.

=== Washington Nationals ===
Tatusko was traded from the Rangers along with Tanner Roark to the Washington Nationals in exchange for Cristian Guzmán on July 30, 2010.

=== Hanwha Eagles ===
On June 16, 2014, Tatusko was sold to the Hanwha Eagles of the KBO League.
