= 1998 Big League World Series =

Tournament details
- Country: United States
- City: Fort Lauderdale, Florida
- Dates: 14–22 August 1998
- Teams: 9

Final positions
- Champions: Thousand Oaks, California
- Runner-up: Venezuela

The 1998 Big League World Series took place from August 14–22 in Fort Lauderdale, Florida, United States. Thousand Oaks, California defeated Venezuela in the championship game. This was the final BLWS held in Fort Lauderdale.

== Teams ==
United States	International
(Florida) Broward County, Florida; District 10; Host	Cape Breton, Nova Scotia, Canada; Cape Breton; Canada
(Indiana) Jeffersonville, Indiana; District 5 Central	(Saudi Arabia) Dhahran, Saudi Arabia; Aramco; Europe
(New York (state)) Rockland, New York; District 18; East	(Northern Mariana Islands) Saipan, Northern Mariana Islands; Saipan; Far East
(Georgia (U.S. state)) Macon, Georgia South	Venezuela Latin America
(California) Thousand Oaks, California; District 13; West	

== Results ==
United States Pool

First Round
—	Florida	5
—	California	7
Lower round 1
0–1	Florida	4
0–1	Indiana	3

Second Round
1–0	California	17
—	(Georgia (U.S. state)) Georgia	2
—	Indiana	2
—	(New York (state)) New York	3
Lower round 2
1–1	Florida	7
0–1	(Georgia (U.S. state)) Georgia	12

Semifinals
2–0	California	11
1–0	(New York (state)) New York	5
Lower final
1–1	(New York (state)) New York	3
1–1	(Georgia (U.S. state)) Georgia	5

United States Championship
3–0	California	10	—
2–1	(Georgia (U.S. state)) Georgia	0	—

International Pool

First Round
—	Venezuela	12
—	Saudi Arabia	2
—	Northern Mariana Islands	3
—	Canada	0
Lower round 1
0–1	Saudi Arabia	3
0–1	Canada	13

Semifinals
1–0	Venezuela	10
1–0	Northern Mariana Islands	0
Lower final
1–1	Northern Mariana Islands	3
1–1	Canada	9

International Championship
2–0	Venezuela	16	—
2–1	Canada	1	—

Elimination Round

Semifinals
3–0	California	10
2–1	(Georgia (U.S. state)) Georgia	0
2–0	Venezuela	16
2–1	Canada	1

World Championship
4–0	California	10
3–0	Venezuela	9

1998 Big League World Series Champions
District 13
Thousand Oaks, California
