= Kevin Vicuña =

Venezuelan baseball player (born 1998)

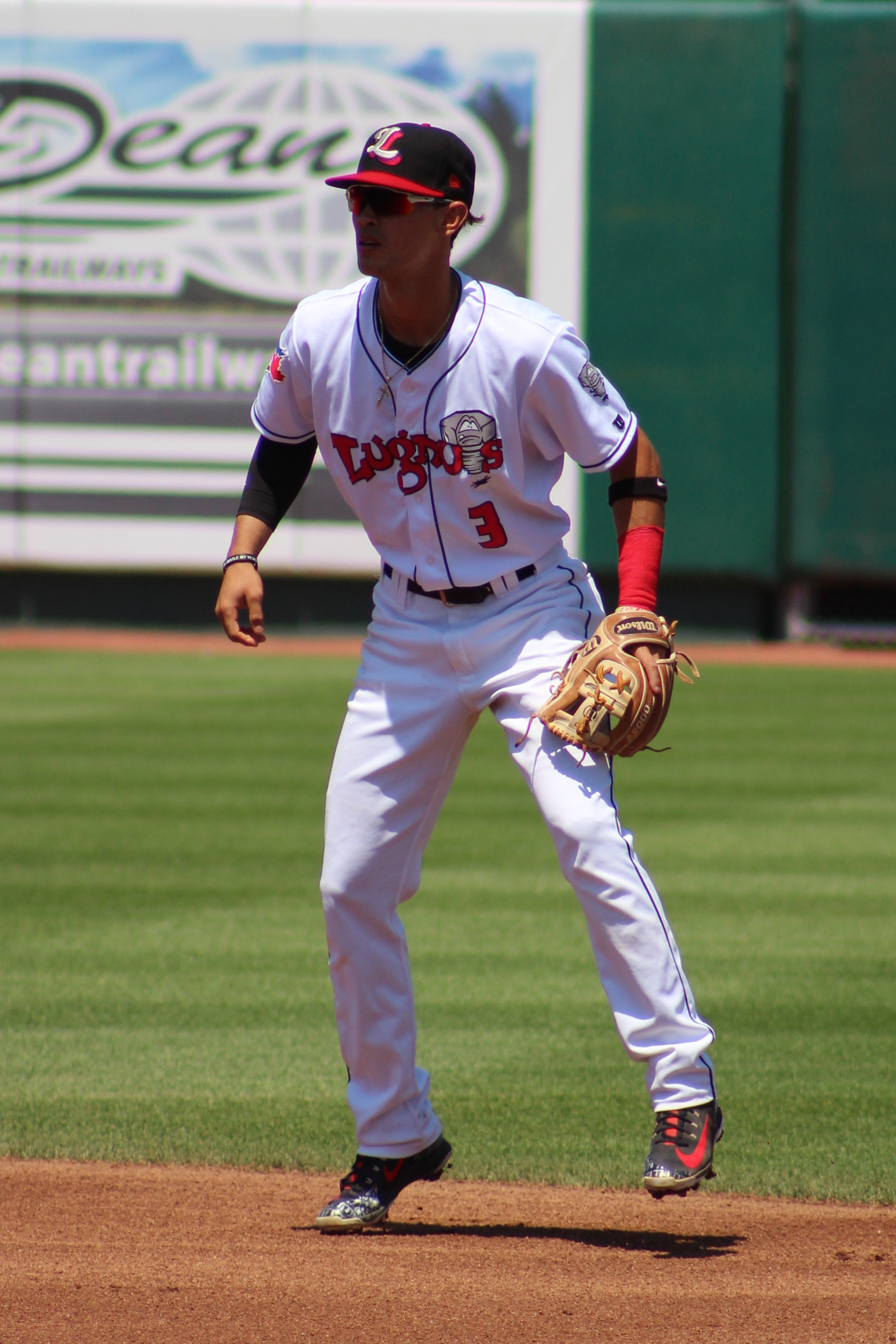
- Vicuña with the Lansing Lugnuts in 2018

Free agent
- Shortstop
- Born: January 14, 1998 (age 28); Puerto la Cruz, Venezuela
- Bats: Right Throws: Right
- Stats at Baseball Reference

Kevin Alejandro Vicuña (born January 14, 1998) is a Venezuelan professional baseball shortstop who is a free agent.

== Career ==
=== Toronto Blue Jays ===
Vicuña signed as an international free agent with the Toronto Blue Jays on July 2, 2014. He made his professional baseball debut in the Dominican Summer League in 2015, and batted .268 with 20 runs batted in (RBI) and 10 stolen bases in 62 games for the Dominican Summer League Blue Jays as a 17-year-old. He spent the 2016 season in Rookie ball, hitting .258 with 14 RBI and 11 stolen bases in 48 games for the Gulf Coast League Blue Jays.

In 2017, Vicuña played for all three of the Blue Jays Single-A affiliates: the Vancouver Canadians, Lansing Lugnuts, and Dunedin Blue Jays. He hit a combined .269 with 25 RBI and 17 stolen bases in 84 games across all levels. Vicuña played all of 2018 for the Lansing Lugnuts, where he hit .266 with two home runs, 37 RBI, and 10 stolen bases in a career-high 89 games. His impressive play started to gather the attention of those in the organization, and he was named the "Sleeper" of the Blue Jays minor league system by Baseball America for 2018. During the 2018 offseason, Vicuña played in 19 games for the Tigres de Aragua of the Venezuelan Winter League. He started the 2019 season in High-A for Dunedin, and hit .253 in 115 games for the year which included a short stint in Triple-A Buffalo. Vicuña did not play in a game in 2020 due to the cancellation of the minor league season because of the COVID-19 pandemic. Vicuña spent the majority of the 2021 season with the Double-A New Hampshire Fisher Cats, also playing 6 games for Triple-A Buffalo. On the year, Vicuña slashed .245/.305/.314 with 2 home runs and 38 RBI in 82 total games. He became a free agent on November 7, 2021.

=== Philadelphia Phillies ===
On January 4, 2022, Vicuña signed a minor league contract with the Philadelphia Phillies. Vicuña played in 88 games for the Double-A Reading Fightin Phils, slashing .272/.326/.372 with 2 home runs, 37 RBI, and 9 stolen bases. He elected free agency following the season on November 10.

=== Arizona Diamondbacks ===
On February 3, 2023, Vicuña signed a minor league contract with the Arizona Diamondbacks organization. On April 5, Vicuña was released by the Diamondbacks.

On April 13, 2023, Vicuña signed with the Cleburne Railroaders of the American Association of Professional Baseball. He was released by the team on April 24.

On May 5, 2023, Vicuña re-signed with the Diamondbacks on a minor league contract. In 36 games split between the High–A Hillsboro Hops and Double–A Amarillo Sod Poodles, he batted .259/.347/.411 with 4 home runs and 11 RBI. On August 21, Vicuña was released by the Diamondbacks organization.

=== Tigres de Quintana Roo ===
On July 4, 2024, Vicuña signed with the Tigres de Quintana Roo of the Mexican League. In 11 games for Quintana Roo, he went 7–for–36 (.194) with one RBI and three stolen bases. On October 1, Vicuña was released by the Tigres.

=== London Majors ===
On February 2, 2026, Vicuña signed with the London Majors of the Canadian Baseball League. However, he was released by the team prior to the start of the regular season on May 10.
