= Eric Milton =

American baseball player (born 1975)

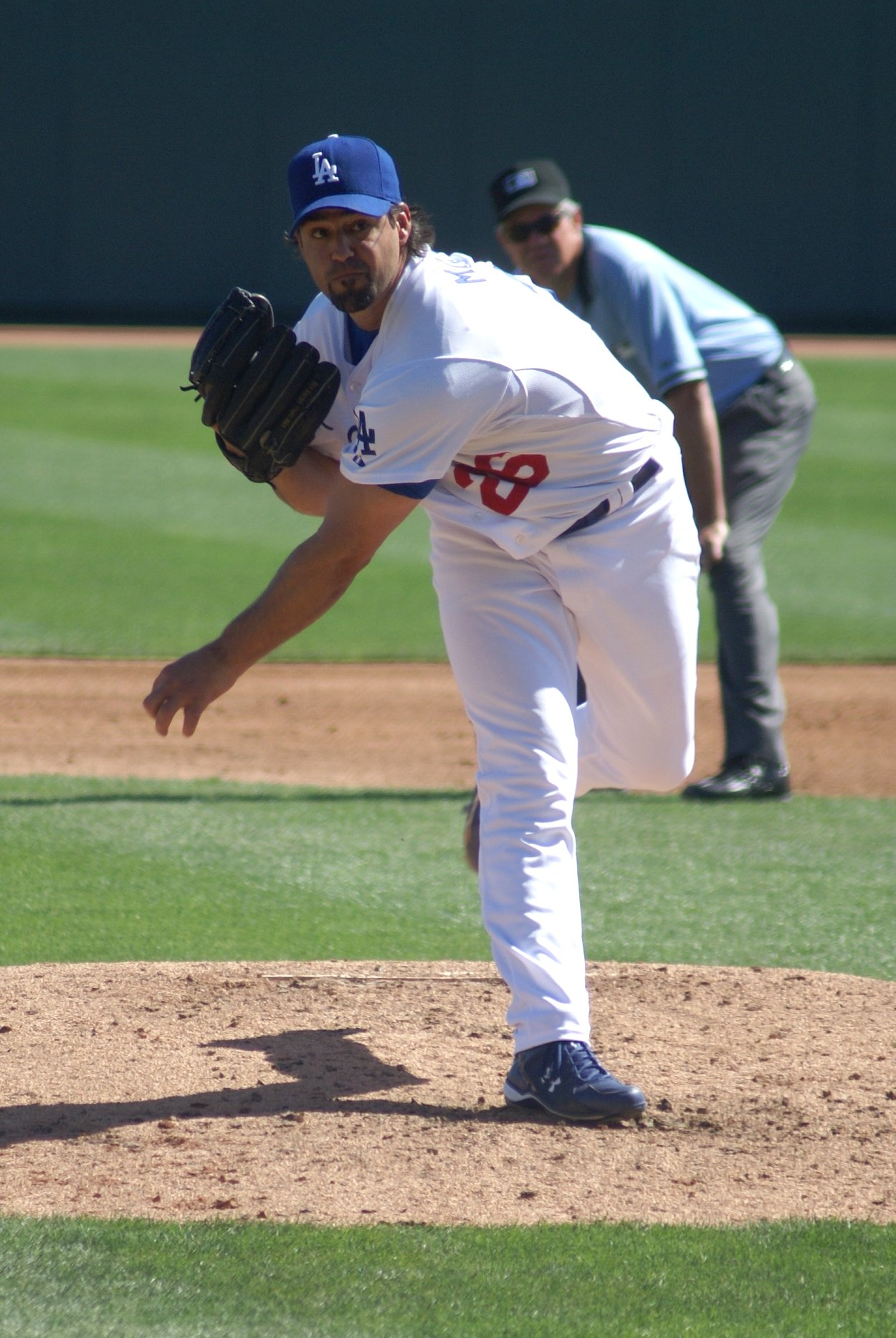
- Milton with the Los Angeles Dodgers
- Pitcher
- Born: August 4, 1975 (age 51); State College, Pennsylvania, U.S.
- Batted: Left Threw: Left

MLB debut
- April 5, 1998, for the Minnesota Twins

Last MLB appearance
- June 27, 2009, for the Los Angeles Dodgers

MLB statistics
- Win–loss record: 89–85
- Earned run average: 4.99
- Strikeouts: 1,127
- Stats at Baseball Reference

Teams
- Minnesota Twins (1998–2003); Philadelphia Phillies (2004); Cincinnati Reds (2005–2007); Los Angeles Dodgers (2009)

Career highlights and awards
- All-Star (2001); Pitched no-hitter on September 11, 1999

Eric Robert Milton (born August 4, 1975) is an American former Major League Baseball left-handed starting pitcher who played for several teams between 1998 and 2009, and is currently the head coach at Severna Park High School.

== Amateur career ==
A native of State College, Pennsylvania, Milton graduated from Bellefonte Area High School in Bellefonte, Pennsylvania and attended the University of Maryland, College Park. In 1996 while at Maryland, Milton played collegiate summer baseball for the Falmouth Commodores of the Cape Cod Baseball League (CCBL). A league all-star, he held opponents to a .105 batting average and set a league record with his microscopic 0.21 ERA. In 2004, Milton was inducted into the CCBL Hall of Fame.

== Major league career ==
=== Minnesota Twins ===
Milton was selected by the New York Yankees in the 1st round (20th pick) of the 1996 Major League Baseball draft; he was drafted as a compensation pick from the California Angels for the signing of Randy Velarde. He played one season in the Yankees minor league system. The New York Yankees traded Milton, Cristian Guzmán, Brian Buchanan, and Danny Mota to the Minnesota Twins for Chuck Knoblauch on February 6, 1998.

He made his Major League debut on April 5, 1998, for the Twins against the Kansas City Royals, working six scoreless innings to pick up the victory. He was 8–14 in his debut season with a 5.64 ERA in 32 starts.

On September 11, 1999, he struck out 13 batters in pitching a 7–0 no-hitter against the Anaheim Angels, the fifth no-hitter in Twins history. He finished the season with an ERA a full run lower than in his previous season, lowering it to 4.49 in 34 starts. He also completed 5 games with 2 shutouts.

In 2000, Milton went 13–10 in 33 starts. He led the team in wins.

In 2001, Milton enjoyed the best season of his career, going 15–7 with a career low 4.32 ERA and pitching in a career high 220 innings.

In 2002, Milton made just 29 starts due to injury. He walked a career low 30 batters, he finished the season 13–9 with a 4.84 ERA in a career low 171 innings. He was limited to 3 starts in 2003 due to a knee injury.

With Minnesota, Milton had a record of 57–51, with 715 strikeouts and a 4.76 ERA, and was selected to the 2001 AL All-Star team. He went 1–0 with a 1.65 ERA with the Twins in the 2002 and 2003 playoffs, and was traded to the Philadelphia Phillies for pitcher Carlos Silva and infielder Nick Punto following the 2003 season.

=== Philadelphia Phillies ===
Milton led the Phillies in wins, starts and strikeouts in 2004, going 14–6 with a 4.75 ERA and 171 strikeouts in 34 starts. He took a no-hitter into the 9th inning on July 25 against the Cubs but lost it before recording an out.

=== Cincinnati Reds ===
At the end of the 2004 season, he signed a three-year, $25 million contract as a free agent with Cincinnati. His record in 2005 with Cincinnati was 8–15 with a 6.47 ERA, one of the worst ERA's for a full-time starter in NL history. The following season, Milton lowered his ERA to 5.19 despite giving up 29 home runs in 26 starts. He finished 8–8 in just 26 starts after missing 3 weeks to repair a torn cartilage in his left knee.

After lingering elbow problems in 2007, Milton underwent Tommy John surgery after just 4 starts, ending his season.

Due to his poor performance and high contract, NPR of Minnesota called him a bust, ESPN named him to their all-overpaid team, and Sports Illustrated named him as the only pitcher on their all bust team, noting he gave up one home run per 11.9 batters.

=== New York Yankees ===
He left the Reds as a free agent after the 2007 season and went unsigned due to his injury history until signing a minor league deal with the New York Yankees on July 11, 2008. He never pitched for any of the Yankees minor league teams during 2008 however and was shortly released.

=== Los Angeles Dodgers ===
Milton signed a minor league contract with the Los Angeles Dodgers on February 10, 2009 with an invitation to spring training. He did not make the Major League team and was assigned to the AAA Albuquerque Isotopes to open the season. In 7 starts with the Isotopes, Milton was 3–2 with a 2.83 ERA. His contract was purchased by the Dodgers on May 14 and on May 16, Milton made his first appearance in the Major leagues since 2007 when he started for the Dodgers against the Florida Marlins.

On May 26, Milton made his second start of the season for the Dodgers against the Colorado Rockies at Coors Field. He worked five innings in the Dodgers 7–1 victory, recording his first Major League win since September 12, 2006. He made a total of five starts for the Dodgers, with a 2–1 record and a 3.80 ERA.

His season ended when he underwent surgery to remove a herniated disk on July 14.

== Coaching ==
Milton joined the Maryland Terrapins baseball program in September 2011 as an assistant coach. On June 28, 2012, Milton was named the interim head coach of the Terrapins after head coach Erik Bakich left to take the head coaching position at the University of Michigan.

Eric was named Head Coach of the Severna Park High School Baseball team in 2013. He coached his oldest son, Kody during the 2015 - 2018 seasons, coming close to winning the State Championship during his son's senior season

One of the players he coached was Jackson Merrill during his time at Severna Park High School. Merrill made his debut with the San Diego Padres in 2024.

== See also ==
- List of Major League Baseball no-hitters

Preceded by David Cone	No-hitter pitcher September 11, 1999	Succeeded by Hideo Nomo
