= 2001 Major League Baseball All-Star Game =

American baseball competition

	1	2	3	4	5	6	7	8	9	R	H	E
National League	0	0	0	0	0	1	0	0	0	1	3	1
American League	0	0	1	0	1	2	0	0	x	4	8	0
- Date: July 10, 2001
- Venue: Safeco Field
- City: Seattle, Washington
- Managers: Bobby Valentine (NYM); Joe Torre (NYY)
- MVP: Cal Ripken Jr. (BAL)
- Attendance: 47,364
- Ceremonial first pitch: Luis Aparicio, Orlando Cepeda, Ferguson Jenkins, Juan Marichal and Tony Pérez
- Television: Fox (United States); MLB International (International)
- TV announcers: Joe Buck and Tim McCarver (Fox); Gary Thorne and Ken Singleton (MLB International)
- Radio: ESPN
- Radio announcers: Charley Steiner and Dave Campbell

The 2001 Major League Baseball All-Star Game was the 72nd playing of the midsummer classic between the all-stars of the American League (AL) and National League (NL), the two leagues comprising Major League Baseball. The game was held on July 10, 2001 at Safeco Field in Seattle, Washington, home of the Seattle Mariners of the American League. The American League defeated the National League, 4–1. This was Cal Ripken Jr.'s 19th and final All-Star Game. It was also the final All-Star Game for San Diego Padres right fielder Tony Gwynn.

The American League squad for the game featured eight players from the Seattle Mariners.

== Rosters ==
=== American League ===
Starters
Position	Player	Team	All-Star Games
P	Roger Clemens	Yankees	8
C	Ivan Rodriguez	Rangers	10
1B	John Olerud	Mariners	2
2B	Bret Boone	Mariners	2
3B–SS	Alex Rodriguez^{[c]}	Rangers	5
SS–3B	Cal Ripken Jr.^{[c]}	Orioles	19
OF	Manny Ramírez	Red Sox	5
OF	Ichiro Suzuki	Mariners	1
OF	Juan Gonzalez	Indians	3
DH	Edgar Martinez	Mariners	6

Pitchers
Position	Player	Team	All-Star Games
P	Freddy Garcia	Mariners	1
P	Joe Mays	Twins	1
P	Jeff Nelson ^{[b]}	Mariners	1
P	Eric Milton	Twins	1
P	Troy Percival	Angels	4
P	Mariano Rivera^{[a]}	Yankees	4
P	Kazuhiro Sasaki	Mariners	1
P	Andy Pettitte	Yankees	2
P	Paul Quantrill	Blue Jays	1
P	Mike Stanton	Yankees	1

Reserves
Position	Player	Team	All-Star Games
C	Jorge Posada	Yankees	2
1B	Tony Clark	Tigers	1
1B	Jason Giambi	Athletics	2
1B	Mike Sweeney	Royals	2
2B	Roberto Alomar	Indians	12
3B	Troy Glaus	Angels	2
SS	Derek Jeter	Yankees	4
SS	Cristian Guzman	Twins	1
OF	Magglio Ordonez	White Sox	3
OF	Bernie Williams	Yankees	5
OF	Greg Vaughn^{[a]}	Devil Rays	4
OF	Mike Cameron ^{[b]}	Mariners	1

=== National League ===
Starters
Position	Player	Team	All-Star Games
P	Randy Johnson	Diamondbacks	8
C	Mike Piazza	Mets	9
1B	Todd Helton	Rockies	2
2B	Jeff Kent	Giants	3
3B	Chipper Jones	Braves	5
SS	Rich Aurilia	Giants	1
OF	Barry Bonds	Giants	10
OF	Luis Gonzalez	Diamondbacks	2
OF	Sammy Sosa	Cubs	5
DH	Larry Walker	Rockies	5

Pitchers
Position	Player	Team	All-Star Games
P	John Burkett	Braves	2
P	Mike Hampton	Rockies	2
P	Jon Lieber	Cubs	1
P	Matt Morris	Cardinals	1
P	Chan Ho Park	Dodgers	1
P	Rick Reed^{[a]}	Mets	2
P	Curt Schilling	Diamondbacks	4
P	Jeff Shaw	Dodgers	2
P	Ben Sheets	Brewers	1
P	Billy Wagner	Astros	2

Reserves
Position	Player	Team	All-Star Games
C	Charles Johnson	Marlins	2
1B	Ryan Klesko	Padres	1
1B	Sean Casey	Reds	2
3B	Albert Pujols	Cardinals	1
3B	Phil Nevin	Padres	1
SS	Jimmy Rollins	Phillies	1
OF	Moises Alou	Astros	4
OF	Lance Berkman	Astros	1
OF	Cliff Floyd^{[b]}	Marlins	1
OF	Brian Giles	Pirates	2
OF	Vladimir Guerrero	Expos	3

Notes

- ^{a} Player declined or was unable to play.
- ^{b} Player replaced vacant spot on roster.
- ^{c} Player played at either shortstop or third base during the game.

== Game ==
=== Umpires ===
Home Plate	Dana DeMuth
First Base	Dale Scott
Second Base	Jim Joyce
Third Base	Jerry Layne
Left Field	Ron Kulpa
Right Field	Tony Randazzo

=== Starting lineups ===
National League				American League			
Order	Player	Team	Position	Order	Player	Team	Position
1	Luis Gonzalez	Diamondbacks	CF	1	Ichiro Suzuki	Mariners	CF
2	Todd Helton	Rockies	1B	2	Alex Rodriguez^{[d]}	Rangers	3B
3	Barry Bonds	Giants	LF	3	Manny Ramírez	Red Sox	LF
4	Sammy Sosa	Cubs	RF	4	Bret Boone	Mariners	2B
5	Larry Walker	Rockies	DH	5	Juan González	Indians	RF
6	Mike Piazza	Mets	C	6	John Olerud	Mariners	1B
7	Chipper Jones	Braves	3B	7	Edgar Martínez	Mariners	DH
8	Jeff Kent	Giants	2B	8	Cal Ripken Jr.^{[d]}	Orioles	SS
9	Rich Aurilia	Giants	SS	9	Iván Rodríguez	Rangers	C
	Randy Johnson	Diamondbacks	P		Roger Clemens	Yankees	P

=== Game summary ===
Tuesday, July 10, 2001 5:35 pm (PDT) at Safeco Field in Seattle, Washington
Team	1	2	3	4	5	6	7	8	9	R	H	E
National League	0	0	0	0	0	1	0	0	0	1	3	1
American League	0	0	1	0	1	2	0	0	x	4	8	0
WP: Freddy García (1-0) LP: Chan Ho Park (0-1) Sv: Kazuhiro Sasaki (1); Home runs: NL: None; AL: Cal Ripken Jr. (1), Magglio Ordóñez (1), Derek Jeter (1)

Before the start of the first inning, Alex Rodriguez voluntarily elected to switch to third base to allow Cal Ripken Jr. to play at the shortstop position one final time at the All-Star Game, which the crowd gave a standing ovation. The move allowed Ripken to set the record for most MLB All-Star appearances at shortstop (15). Seattle's own Ichiro Suzuki gave his hometown fans something to cheer for early, when in the first, he singled off starter (and former Mariner) Randy Johnson, and then stole second. Johnson stranded him at second to hold the AL scoreless in the first inning. Ripken followed this with a home run in the third inning, which also got a standing ovation, to put the AL up 1–0.

The AL scored one more run in the fifth when Iván Rodríguez singled home Jason Giambi to make it 2–0. Ryan Klesko hit a sacrifice fly to cut the lead to one in the sixth, scoring Jeff Kent from third. In the sixth, with the score 2–1, Derek Jeter and Magglio Ordóñez hit back to back home runs off Jon Lieber to extend the AL's lead to 4–1.

That ended the scoring for the night. Mariner closer Kazuhiro Sasaki retired the side in order in the ninth to secure the win for the AL. Cal Ripken was awarded the game's MVP, becoming the fourth player ever—and first from the American League—to win two All-Star Game MVP awards.

Notes

- ^{d} Player changed starting position before the first inning.

== Home Run Derby ==
Safeco Field, Seattle—N.L. 41, A.L. 25
Player	Team	Round 1	Semis	Finals	Totals
Luis Gonzalez	Diamondbacks	5	5	6	16
Sammy Sosa	Cubs	3	8	2	13
Jason Giambi	A's	14	6	–	20
Barry Bonds	Giants	7	3	–	10
Bret Boone	Mariners	3	–	–	3
Todd Helton	Rockies	2	–	–	2
Alex Rodriguez	Rangers	2	–	–	2
Troy Glaus	Angels	0	–	–	0

Semifinals
1	Jason Giambi	6
4	Sammy Sosa	8
2	Barry Bonds	3
3	Luis Gonzalez	5

Finals
4	Sammy Sosa	2
3	Luis Gonzalez	6

== Trivia ==
- Cal Ripken Jr., most famous during his career as a shortstop, was elected as a third baseman to start the game. Texas Rangers shortstop Alex Rodriguez was elected to start at short. However, Rodriguez insisted that Ripken play shortstop for the first inning. American League manager Joe Torre agreed and allowed the change. When fans noticed the fielding change, they gave both players a standing ovation.
- This was the first All-Star Game to be awarded by Commissioner Bud Selig after being named to that post.
- American League starting pitcher Roger Clemens was booed in the pregame ceremonies for striking out 15 Mariners in a one-hit shutout in the previous season's playoffs. Also in the pregame ceremony, the Fort Lewis color guard provided the colors presentation, accompanied by Tacoma and Everett, Washington high school students who presented the flags in the outfield. After Diana Krall and Mýa sang the Canadian and U.S. national anthems, respectively, Tony Pérez, as the only link to the 1979 All-Star Game, the only other All-Star Game in Seattle, joined the ceremonial first pitch ceremonies.
- The film Summer Catch had a premiere in Seattle at the now-defunct theater chain General Cinemas Pacific Place 12 to coincide with the All-Star Game. In attendance was Meatloaf, Jessica Biel, Wilmer Valderrama and fellow That '70s Show costar Danny Masterson.
