= Joe Mays (pitcher) =

American baseball player (born 1975)

- Pitcher
- Born: December 10, 1975 (age 50); Flint, Michigan, U.S.
- Batted: Switch Threw: Right

MLB debut
- April 7, 1999, for the Minnesota Twins

Last MLB appearance
- July 22, 2006, for the Cincinnati Reds

MLB statistics
- Win–loss record: 48–70
- Earned run average: 5.05
- Strikeouts: 512
- Stats at Baseball Reference

Teams
- Minnesota Twins (1999–2003, 2005); Kansas City Royals (2006); Cincinnati Reds (2006)

Career highlights and awards
- All-Star (2001)

Joseph Emerson Mays (born December 10, 1975) is an American former professional baseball right-handed pitcher. He played in Major League Baseball (MLB) for the Minnesota Twins, Kansas City Royals, and Cincinnati Reds.

Mays is a 1994 graduate of Southeast High School in Bradenton, Florida. He also attended Manatee Community College in Bradenton. He and his wife, Melinda (née Rogers), have two children.

== Professional career ==
=== Minnesota Twins ===
Mays began his major league career with the Minnesota Twins on April 7, 1999. He began the season in the bullpen before going to the rotation, he finished the season pitching in 49 games with a record of 6-11 for the Twins.

The following season he was a member of the starting rotation, pitching poorly throughout the season, finishing with an ERA of 5.56 and a record of 7–15 in 31 games (28 starts).

He had his best season in 2001, going 17–13 with a 3.16 ERA. He led the league in ERA+ (143) and was selected to the All-Star Game. He pitched in a career high 233 innings and 4 complete games. In January 2002 he signed a four-year extension with the Twins for $20 million that would last to the end of the 2005 season.

Mays missed all of the 2004 season after having Tommy John surgery performed on his pitching arm. Through 2003, he posted a 42–55 record with a 4.70 ERA. Mays successfully bounced back from his surgery to rejoin the Twins' starting rotation at the beginning of the 2005 season, and recorded his first win since the 2003 season on April 27, 2005, against the Kansas City Royals.

Due to his losing record and disappointing ERA, on August 26, 2005, Twins manager Ron Gardenhire demoted Mays to the Twins bullpen and called up Scott Baker from the Triple-A Rochester Red Wings to replace Mays in the pitching rotation. Despite his pitching setbacks, Mays regularly shut down the rival Chicago White Sox, leading White Sox broadcaster Hawk Harrelson to call him “Cy” Mays.

Mays never recaptured the success of his 2001 season. From 2002 through 2005 he had a 5.81 ERA and a 77 ERA+.

On October 7, 2005, the Twins chose not to renew Mays' contract for 2006, making him a free agent.

=== Kansas City Royals ===
Mays signed with the Kansas City Royals on December 23, 2005. Mays' Royals career was short-lived, as he was released on May 16, 2006, after posting an 0–4 record in 6 starts with a 10.27 ERA.

=== Cincinnati Reds ===
On May 19, 2006, Mays signed a minor league contract with the Cincinnati Reds organization and was assigned to the Triple-A Louisville Bats. On June 6, Mays had his contract purchased by the Reds, and was added to their active roster. However, Mays was designated for assignment on July 26, ending his short stint with the Reds.

=== Los Angeles Dodgers ===
Mays was a free agent through the entirety of 2006. He signed a minor league contract with the Los Angeles Dodgers on February 7, 2007. The contract included an invitation to spring training, where Mays failed to make the big league roster. Mays requested and received his release on May 16, after pitching in eight starts.

== Personal ==
Mays is a distant cousin of submarine pitcher Carl Mays who threw the pitch that resulted in the death of Ray Chapman, the only Major League Baseball player to die during a game as a direct result of an on-field injury, on August 16, 1920.
