= Chuck Knoblauch =

American baseball player (born 1968)

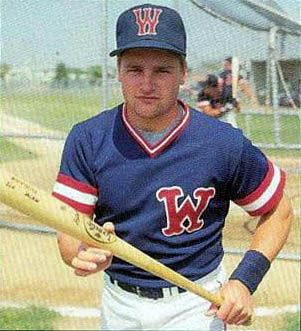
- Knoblauch with the Wareham Gatemen in 1988
- Second baseman
- Born: July 7, 1968 (age 58); Houston, Texas, U.S.
- Batted: Right Threw: Right

MLB debut
- April 9, 1991, for the Minnesota Twins

Last MLB appearance
- September 27, 2002, for the Kansas City Royals

MLB statistics
- Batting average: .289
- Home runs: 98
- Runs batted in: 615
- Stolen bases: 407
- Stats at Baseball Reference

Teams
- Minnesota Twins (1991–1997); New York Yankees (1998–2001); Kansas City Royals (2002)

Career highlights and awards
- 4× All-Star (1992, 1994, 1996, 1997); 4× World Series champion (1991, 1998–2000); AL Rookie of the Year (1991); Gold Glove Award (1997); 2× Silver Slugger Award (1995, 1997)

Edward Charles Knoblauch (/ˈnɒblɔːk/; born July 7, 1968) is an American former professional baseball player. He played 12 seasons in Major League Baseball, from 1991 through 2002, for the Minnesota Twins, New York Yankees, and Kansas City Royals. He played mostly as a second baseman before moving to left field for his final two seasons.

== Early life ==
Born in Houston, Texas, Knoblauch came from a baseball family, as his uncle Eddie Knoblauch and father Ray Knoblauch played and managed in the minor leagues between the late 1930s and mid-1950s. Knoblauch played for the Bellaire High School baseball team, which also produced many other former major leaguers, including Chris Young and José Cruz Jr. Knoblauch missed his senior season (1986) due to a broken leg, but he cheered from the bench as the team won the state championship.

The Philadelphia Phillies selected Knoblauch in the 18th round of the 1986 amateur draft, but he did not sign. He attended Texas A&M University and played college baseball for the Texas A&M Aggies, where he was a second-team All-American. He later played on the 1989 team that finished the season with 58 wins, the highest total in school history.

In 1988, Knoblauch played collegiate summer baseball with the Wareham Gatemen of the Cape Cod Baseball League (CCBL), and received the league's Outstanding Pro Prospect award. In 2001, he was inducted into the CCBL Hall of Fame.

== Major league career ==
=== Minnesota Twins ===
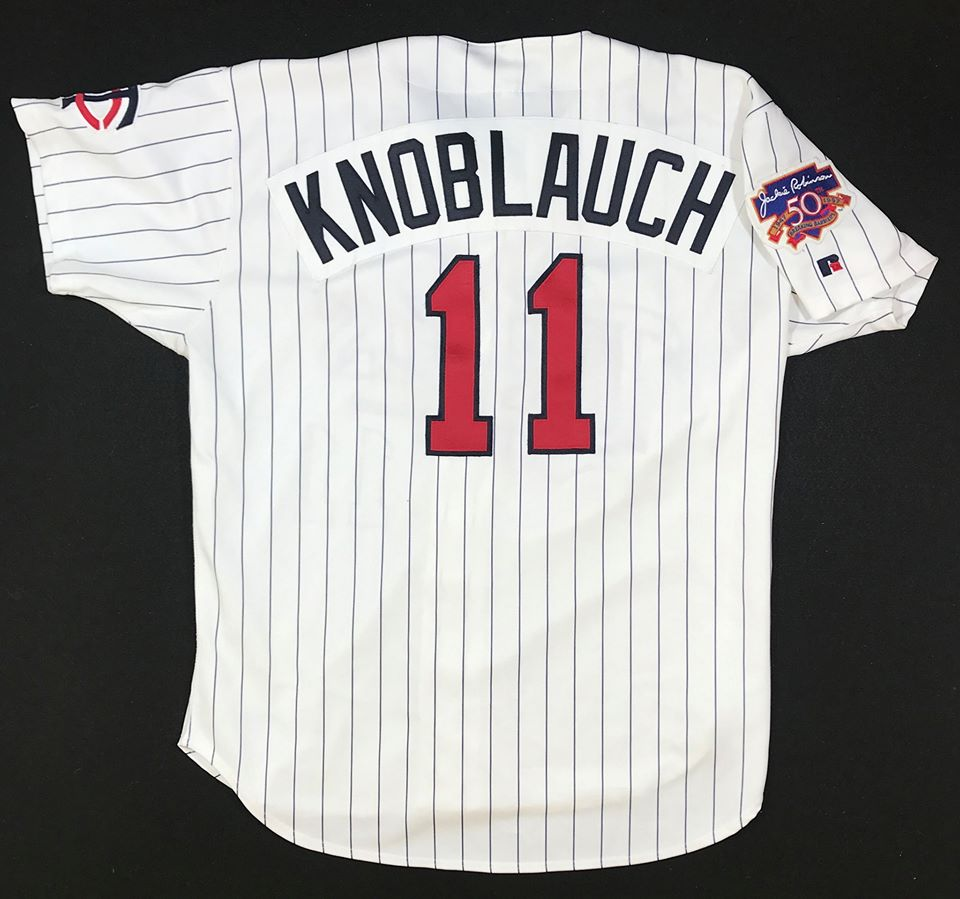
1997 Minnesota Twins #11 Chuck Knoblauch home jersey

Knoblauch was drafted by the Minnesota Twins in the first round of the 1989 MLB draft, 25th overall. Knoblauch won the American League Rookie of the Year award and a World Series ring as a member of the 1991 Minnesota Twins. In Game 7 of the World Series, Knoblauch attempted to deceive Lonnie Smith by appearing to start a double play on a Terry Pendleton double (causing Smith to get only to third base when he might have scored for the Atlanta Braves). Smith claimed he lost track of the ball and Knoblauch's decoy was not a factor.

During the 1994–96 seasons, Knoblauch batted .312, .333, and .341, respectively, won the AL Gold Glove Award at second base in 1997, and stole over 40 bases in three consecutive seasons.

The Twins traded Knoblauch to the New York Yankees for Eric Milton, Cristian Guzmán, Brian Buchanan, Danny Mota, and $3 million on February 6, 1998. Once a popular player in Minnesota, his request to be traded from the Twins resulted in being booed on successive trips to the Metrodome. This included throwing hot dogs, bottles, and golf balls at Knoblauch during a visit to the Metrodome in 2001.

=== New York Yankees ===
Knoblauch's arrival in New York was greeted with anticipation. Buster Olney, then with The New York Times, predicted that Knoblauch and Derek Jeter would form the greatest double play combination in history. Though he struggled early on with the team, he hit a career-high 17 home runs as the Yankees won a then-American league-record 114 games. In game 2 of the 1998 American League Championship Series against the Cleveland Indians, Knoblauch was involved in an infamous defensive play. In the 12th inning with the score tied 1–1, Indians batter Travis Fryman bunted, and Knoblauch covered first base for a possible putout. Jeff Nelson's throw hit Fryman and rolled away, but instead of retrieving the ball, Knoblauch argued with the first-base umpire interference should have been called, while the ball was still live at which Indians baserunner Enrique Wilson was able to score from first base on the play, giving Cleveland the lead in an eventual 4–1 victory. A New York newspaper called Knoblauch a "Blauch-head". Knoblauch recovered and was an important factor in the World Series victory over the San Diego Padres, and the 1999 World Series victory over the Atlanta Braves. In Game 3 of the 1999 World Series, Knoblauch scored the game's first run and hit a dramatic two-run home run in the eighth inning to tie the score, with the Yankees eventually winning in the 10th inning. In Game 5 of 2001 World Series, Knoblauch scored the winning run, having led off the inning with a single and scoring on a single by his replacement at second base, Alfonso Soriano. The Yankees won the American League pennant every year he was with the team, winning three World Series championships.

=== Kansas City Royals ===
Towards the end of his career, Knoblauch's performance at the plate grew worse, with many observers believing he was preoccupied by his fielding troubles and trying too hard to hit home runs. Knoblauch was benched in the final game of the 2001 World Series (he hit just .056), and left for Kansas City as a free agent in the off season. Knoblauch played in just 80 games in left field for the Royals, batting .210, and the team declined to offer him a new contract the following year. In 2003, having failed to gain a job with an MLB team, Knoblauch announced his retirement.

== Throwing troubles ==
Once considered one of the game's best fielders (in fact, ESPN personalities nicknamed him "Fundamentally Sound" Chuck Knoblauch), Knoblauch's play deteriorated shortly into his Yankee career; his errors at second doubled from 13 in 1998 to 26 the following year; all of these were throwing errors. In 2000, he began to have difficulty making accurate throws to first base, a condition sometimes referred to in sport as the yips. Personal problems may have contributed to the "yips" -- his divorce from his first wife, Lisa, in 1999, and the deterioration of his father's health from Alzheimer's.

Knoblauch tried various solutions to his problem, but his throwing did not improve. He made 15 errors in less than half a season in 2000, including 10 throwing miscues. (During one game, an errant throw sailed into the stands and hit sportscaster Keith Olbermann's mother in the head). After making three throwing errors in six innings of the Yankees' 12–3 loss to the Chicago White Sox, on June 15, 2000, Knoblauch voluntarily left the game. He then left Yankee Stadium in his street clothes while the game was still in progress. He was back at second the next day, but Knoblauch never fully recovered his throwing accuracy, especially after missing most of August with an injury. Knoblauch returned to the Yankees in September, but was often used as a designated hitter in lieu of playing second; he was exclusively a DH in the Yankees' run to a World Series title. Finally, in 2001, he was reassigned to left field by manager Joe Torre, never to return to his old position.

== Spousal assaults ==
On September 25, 2009, an officer from the Memorial Villages Police Department, near Houston, was told by Knoblauch's wife, Stacey Stelmach, that he hit and choked her. A police officer's affidavit alleged that "redness around her neck and swelling near her eye [were] consistent with her statement." On September 29, 2009, the Harris County, Texas District Attorney charged Knoblauch with assaulting a family member by choking, a third-degree felony in Texas. Knoblauch pleaded guilty to misdemeanor assault in connection with the case on March 16, 2010. The couple was reportedly going through a divorce.

On July 24, 2014, the 46-year-old Knoblauch was charged with assault of a family member again, his ex-wife Cheri. Due to this incident, the Twins cancelled the planned induction of Knoblauch into the Twins Hall of Fame.

== Legacy ==
A four-time All-Star, in his career Knoblauch batted .289 with 98 home runs and 615 runs batted in. He stole 25 or more bases in 10 of his 12 seasons, finishing with 407 in his career — including 276 with the Twins, the most for the team since its move from Washington in 1961. On August 18, 2018, Knoblauch returned to the new Yankee Stadium to commemorate the 1998 championship team.

== HGH use ==
In December 2007, Knoblauch was included in the Mitchell report, which provided evidence that he used performance-enhancing drugs during his career. In the Mitchell report, Brian McNamee stated that he procured human growth hormone (HGH) from Kirk Radomski for Knoblauch in 2001 when he served as the New York Yankees assistant strength coach. McNamee stated that during the season, he injected Knoblauch seven to nine times with HGH. McNamee said that Knoblauch paid Radomski for the drugs through him or Jason Grimsley, and also believed that Knoblauch obtained HGH from Grimsley. Knoblauch did not respond to a request to meet with the Mitchell investigators to discuss the allegations.

On December 20, 2007, Knoblauch was named in Jason Grimsley's unsealed affidavit as an alleged user of HGH. Knoblauch and Grimsley were teammates on the Yankees from 1999 to 2000.

On January 11, 2008, The New York Times published a look at Chuck Knoblauch's post-baseball life. The article painted Knoblauch's outlook on baseball and the Mitchell report as being apathetic. As he has been retired for 5 years, he expressed "bewilderment at his inclusion" in the report and stated, "I have nothing to defend and I have nothing to hide at the same time." In 2008, Knoblauch owned a condominium and house in the Houston area, and was not interested in returning to pro baseball in any capacity.

On January 22, 2008, Knoblauch was subpoenaed by the congressional committee investigating steroids in baseball after he failed to respond to an invitation to give a deposition by a January 18, 2008, deadline. On January 23, federal marshals had as yet been unable to find Knoblauch to serve him with the subpoena.

On January 28, 2008, the congressional subpoena was withdrawn after Knoblauch agreed to provide a deposition on February 1, 2008.

Knoblauch admitted to using HGH: "I did HGH. It didn't help me out. It didn't make me any better. I had the worst years of my career from a batting average standpoint. And I got hurt. So there was no good that came out of it for me — it was not performance-enhancing for me."

== See also ==
- List of Major League Baseball career runs scored leaders
- List of Major League Baseball career stolen bases leaders
- List of Major League Baseball annual doubles leaders
- List of Major League Baseball annual triples leaders
- List of Major League Baseball players named in the Mitchell Report
- List of Texas A&M University people
