= Matt Kinney =

American baseball player (born 1976)

- Pitcher
- Born: December 16, 1976 (age 49); Bangor, Maine, U.S.
- Batted: Right Threw: Right

Professional debut
- MLB: August 18, 2000, for the Minnesota Twins
- NPB: March 23, 2008, for the Saitama Seibu Lions

Last appearance
- MLB: September 28, 2005, for the San Francisco Giants
- NPB: September 28, 2008, for the Saitama Seibu Lions

MLB statistics
- Win–loss record: 19–27
- Earned run average: 5.29
- Strikeouts: 297
- Stats at Baseball Reference

Teams
- Minnesota Twins (2000, 2002); Milwaukee Brewers (2003–2004); Kansas City Royals (2004); San Francisco Giants (2005); Saitama Seibu Lions (2008)

Matthew John Kinney (born December 16, 1976) is an American former professional baseball pitcher. He spent 2008 with the Saitama Seibu Lions of the Nippon Professional Baseball (MLB). Kinney is a graduate of Bangor High School. Kinney and his Little League team was featured in the Stephen King essay "Head Down", featured in King's Nightmares and Dreamscapes collection. He now resides in Maine with his two sons.

== Career ==
Kinney was drafted out of Bangor High School in the sixth round of the 1995 amateur draft by the Boston Red Sox. He was traded to the Minnesota Twins along with John Barnes for Orlando Merced and Greg Swindell in July 1998. Kinney made his MLB debut in 2000 with the Twins, going 2–2 with a 5.10 ERA in 8 starts. In 2002, he had just a 4.64 ERA with the Minnesota Twins, but went 2-7 that year. He was traded in the 2002 off-season to the Milwaukee Brewers. In 2003 and 2004 with the Brewers, he combined for a 13–17 record. On August 6, 2004, Kinney was designated for assignment by the Brewers and was claimed off waivers by the Kansas City Royals. He made 11 relief appearances with the Royals that season. During the 2007-2008 offseason, Kinney signed with the Saitama Seibu Lions, playing in Japan for a single season. Kinney returned to the United States in 2009 to play with the Fresno Grizzlies, the AAA affiliate of the San Francisco Giants.

Kinney gave up Barry Bonds' 660th home run, which tied Bonds with his godfather Willie Mays.

On August 24, 2010, while with the Triple-A Fresno Grizzlies of the Pacific Coast League, Kinney received a 50-game suspension after testing positive for an amphetamine, a banned performance-enhancing substance. Kinney took responsibility for the suspension but explained that the amphetamine in question was contained in Adderall, a drug he has been taking since 2005 to treat his attention deficit hyperactivity disorder, and was taken for medical reasons, not to boost his on-field performance. The suspension came as a result of his forgetting to file the proper paperwork with Major League Baseball when he signed with the Giants earlier in the year.
