= Cristian Guzmán =

Dominican baseball player (born 1978)

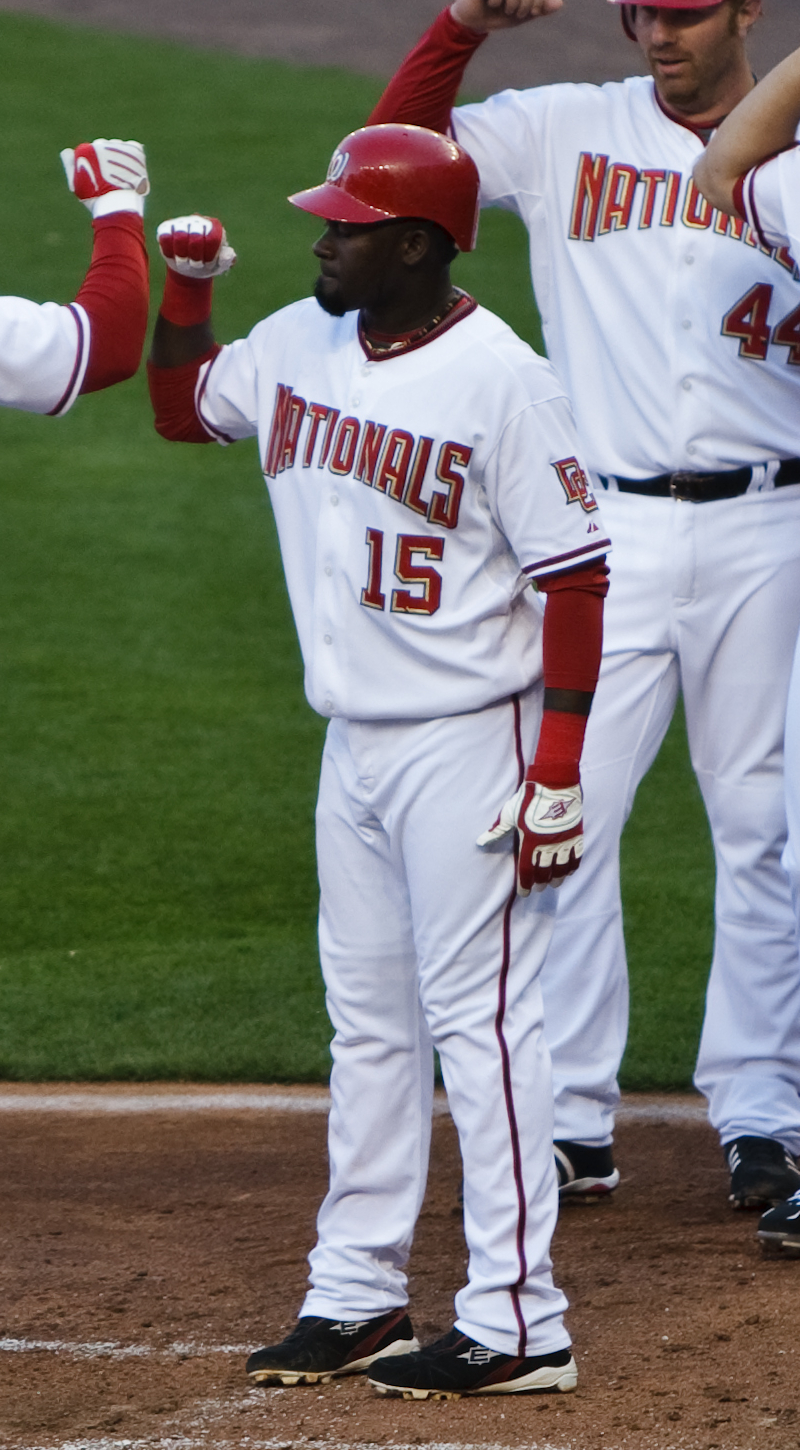
- Guzmán with the Washington Nationals in 2009
- Shortstop
- Born: March 21, 1978 (age 48); Baní, Dominican Republic
- Batted: Switch Threw: Right

MLB debut
- April 6, 1999, for the Minnesota Twins

Last MLB appearance
- September 8, 2010, for the Texas Rangers

MLB statistics
- Batting average: .271
- Home runs: 62
- Runs batted in: 467
- Stats at Baseball Reference

Teams
- Minnesota Twins (1999–2004); Washington Nationals (2005, 2007–2010); Texas Rangers (2010)

Career highlights and awards
- 2× All-Star (2001, 2008)

Cristian Antonio Guzmán (born March 21, 1978) is a Dominican former professional baseball shortstop. He played in Major League Baseball (MLB) for the Minnesota Twins, Washington Nationals, and Texas Rangers.

== Professional career ==
=== Minnesota Twins ===
The New York Yankees traded Guzmán, Eric Milton, Brian Buchanan, and Danny Mota to the Minnesota Twins for Chuck Knoblauch on February 6, 1998.

In 2001, Guzmán was named to the AL All-Star team and posted career bests with 10 home runs and a .302 batting average. He was a key part of the Twins teams that won three consecutive American League Central titles from 2002–2004. While a Twin, he led the American League in triples in 2000 (20), 2001 (14) and 2003 (14). His total of 20 in 2000 was only the tenth time a player had reached that number in the last 70 years.

=== Washington Nationals ===
After becoming a free agent, Guzmán signed a $16.8 million, four-year contract with the Washington Nationals for the 2005 season but then proceeded to have the worst year of his career. As the full-time shortstop, he was batting .192 at the end of August, but rallied in September, hitting .325, which helped bring his average up to .219.

Three days after the disastrous 2005 season, Guzmán had eye surgery, which he credited as a prime reason for his resurgence in the following years.

Guzmán was sidelined for the entire 2006 campaign with a shoulder injury and subsequent surgery, but returned in 2007 as the Nationals' starting shortstop following the trade of second baseman José Vidro to the Seattle Mariners and the move of Felipe López to second base. However, he injured his hamstring on the first day of the regular season. He was on the disabled list until May 7, 2007. Batting leadoff, he was hitting .329 (second on the team), and despite missing almost half of the season through late June, was third in the league with six triples. On June 24, however, Guzmán was injured while tagging out a would-be base-stealer, and had surgery the next day to repair a torn thumb ligament, sidelining him for the rest of the 2007 season.

On March 30, 2008, Guzmán got the first hit in the history of Nationals Park, a broken bat single to right off Atlanta Braves starter Tim Hudson. He followed with the first run in the history of the park, after an RBI double by Nick Johnson. He made the NL All-Star team as the Nationals' lone representative in 2008. He ended up playing third base in the All-Star Game, and made some crucial fielding plays at that position, even though he had previously only played shortstop as a major leaguer. On August 28, 2008, Guzmán hit for the cycle against the Los Angeles Dodgers; only the second cycle in Nationals history. Guzman signed a two-year contract extension to stay with the Nats.

He finished the 2008 season 4th the league in hits and batting average. By the All-Star break in 2009, he was fourth among active players for triples.

He had the lowest fielding percentage of any starting major league shortstop in 2009 (.962).

=== Texas Rangers ===
On July 31, 2010, the Texas Rangers acquired Guzmán from the Nationals for two minor leaguers, Tanner Roark and Ryan Tatusko. Guzman played his first game as a Ranger on August 1 against the Angels in L.A. and went 0–3 with a walk.

=== 2011 ===
Although Guzmán received spring training invitations from two teams, he was forced to miss at least the first half of the season to deal with unspecified family issues.

=== Cleveland Indians ===
Guzmán signed a minor league contract with the Cleveland Indians on February 21, 2012. After suffering a strained hamstring during spring training, he was released by the Indians on March 28.

== See also ==
- List of Major League Baseball annual triples leaders
- List of Major League Baseball players to hit for the cycle

Achievements
Preceded by Mark Kotsay	Hitting for the cycle August 28, 2008	Succeeded by Stephen Drew
