= Danny Mota =

Dominican baseball player (born 1975)

- Pitcher
- Born: October 9, 1975 (age 49); El Seibo, Dominican Republic
- Batted: Right Threw: Right

MLB debut
- September 15, 2000, for the Minnesota Twins

Last MLB appearance
- October 1, 2000, for the Minnesota Twins

MLB statistics
- Win–loss record: 0–0
- Earned run average: 8.44
- Strikeouts: 3

CPBL statistics
- Win–loss record: 0–1
- Earned run average: 6.23
- Strikeouts: 3
- Stats at Baseball Reference

Teams
- Minnesota Twins (2000); Sinon Bulls (2002)

Daniel Avila Mota (born October 9, 1975) is a Dominican former Major League Baseball pitcher. Mota played for the Minnesota Twins in the 2000 season. In four games, he had an 8.44 ERA in 5.1 innings pitched with three strikeouts. Mota batted and threw right-handed.

Mota was signed by the New York Yankees as an amateur free agent in 1994. The Yankees traded Mota, Eric Milton, Cristian Guzmán, and Brian Buchanan to the Minnesota Twins for Chuck Knoblauch on February 6, 1998.
