= Jay Canizaro =

American baseball player (born 1973)

- Second baseman
- Born: July 4, 1973 (age 51); Beaumont, Texas, U.S.
- Batted: Right Threw: Right

MLB debut
- April 28, 1996, for the San Francisco Giants

Last MLB appearance
- May 31, 2002, for the Minnesota Twins

MLB statistics
- Batting average: .250
- Home runs: 10
- Runs batted in: 68
- Stats at Baseball Reference

Teams
- San Francisco Giants (1996, 1999); Minnesota Twins (2000, 2002)

Jason Kyle Canizaro (born July 4, 1973) is an American former professional baseball second baseman who spent parts of four seasons in Major League Baseball (MLB) with the San Francisco Giants and the Minnesota Twins.

== Career ==
Canizaro was drafted by the Giants in 1993 in the fourth round of the draft after playing at Oklahoma State. He made his major league debut in 1996 with the team, but returned to the minors until 1999, when he was again called up. Following the 1999 season, he signed a contract with the Minnesota Twins. He enjoyed his best season in baseball with the Twins in 2000, hitting .269 as the Twins' primary second baseman. After the 2002 season with the Twins, his last in the majors, Canizaro signed a minor league contract with the Tampa Bay Devil Rays, but failed to make the major league roster and left baseball the following season.
