= Brian Buchanan =

American baseball player & coach (born 1973)

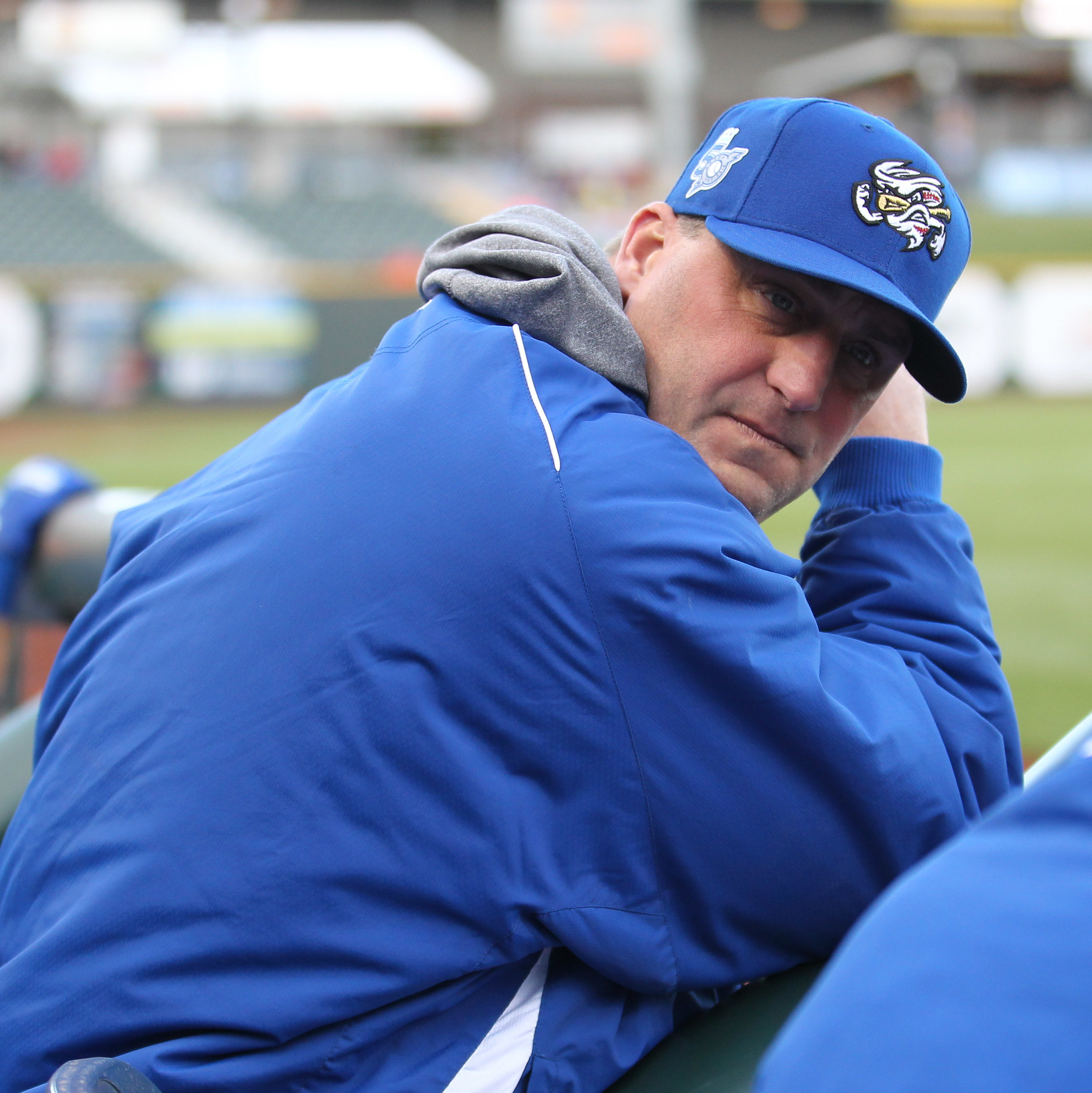
- Buchanan as hitting coach of the Omaha Storm Chasers in 2018
- Right fielder
- Born: July 21, 1973 (age 53); Miami, Florida, U.S.
- Batted: Right Threw: Right

Professional debut
- MLB: May 19, 2000, for the Minnesota Twins
- NPB: March 29, 2007, for the Fukuoka SoftBank Hawks

Last appearance
- MLB: August 29, 2004, for the New York Mets
- NPB: 2007, for the Fukuoka SoftBank Hawks

MLB statistics
- Batting average: .258
- Home runs: 32
- Runs batted in: 103

NPB statistics
- Batting average: .285
- Home runs: 11
- Runs batted in: 48
- Stats at Baseball Reference

Teams
- As player: Minnesota Twins (2000–2002); San Diego Padres (2002–2004); New York Mets (2004); Fukuoka SoftBank Hawks (2007); As coach: Kansas City Royals (2017–2022)

Brian James Buchanan (born July 21, 1973) is an American former professional baseball outfielder and coach. He played in Major League Baseball (MLB) from 2000 through 2004 for the Minnesota Twins, San Diego Padres, and the New York Mets, and in Nippon Professional Baseball (NPB) for the Fukuoka SoftBank Hawks in 2007.

== Early life ==
Buchanan was born in Miami, on July 21, 1973. He attended Fairfax High School in Fairfax, Virginia, where he excelled not only at hitting but at first base as well, and was named First Team All-Region for all of Northern Virginia. The team finished the regular season with a 17–4 record. Fairfax teammate Bill Pulsipher also made it to the Major Leagues after being drafted in the second round of the 1991 MLB draft by the New York Mets.

A standout player at the University of Virginia (UVA), in 1993 Buchanan played collegiate summer baseball with the Brewster Whitecaps of the Cape Cod Baseball League, and in 1994 returned to the Cape League to play for the Hyannis Mets. He was drafted by the New York Yankees in the first round (24th overall) of the 1994 MLB draft. Buchanan still holds Virginia baseball season records for home runs, slugging percentage, and total bases. He was the first University of Virginia player to be chosen in the first round of the MLB draft and was inducted into the Virginia Baseball Hall of Fame in 2018.

== Playing career ==
=== New York Yankees ===
From 1994 through 1997, Buchanan played in the New York Yankees' minor league system, advancing to the Triple-A level. While playing at Class A Greensboro, a horrific ankle injury in the spring of 1995 nearly ended Buchanan's career after his left foot hit first base at an awkward angle. Doctors were uncertain that Buchanan would recover, let alone play baseball again.

=== Minnesota Twins ===
The New York Yankees traded Buchanan, Eric Milton, Cristian Guzmán, and Danny Mota to the Minnesota Twins for Chuck Knoblauch on February 6, 1998.

With the Twins, Buchanan made his MLB debut in the 2000 season, appearing in 30 games. He went on to play 69 games with the Twins in 2001, and 44 games in 2002. In his 143 games with the Twins, he batted .258 with 16 home runs and 55 RBIs.

=== San Diego Padres ===
In July 2002, Buchanan was traded to the San Diego Padres for Jason Bartlett. He appeared in 48 games with the Padres in 2002, batting .293; 115 games in 2003, batting .263; and 38 games in 2004, batting .200. He had a total of 16 home runs and 48 RBIs with the Padres. During his time with the Padres, Buchanan was considered one of the most feared right-handed pinch hitters in the game. He was one of the few hitters in the league who would wear only one batting glove, and batting glove company, Franklin, decided to come out with a signature "Buck" batting glove.

=== New York Mets ===
In 2004, Buchanan appeared in two games with the New York Mets; he was hitless in three at bats. Overall in his MLB career, Buchanan appeared in 346 games, batting .258 with 32 home runs and 103 RBIs.

=== Late career ===
During 2006, Buchanan played for the St. Paul Saints of the American Association of Independent Professional Baseball. After the 2006 season, he joined the Fukuoka SoftBank Hawks in Japan, after two years playing in the minors for the Rochester Red Wings, Colorado Springs Sky Sox, and Louisville Bats. Buchanan played 99 games for the Hawks, mostly as a DH, batting .285 with 11 home runs and 48 RBI.

During the 2007–08 offseason, Buchanan signed a minor league contract with the Kansas City Royals and became a free agent after the season. In January 2009, he re-signed with the Royals and played for their Triple-A affiliate, the Omaha Royals, and even made relief pitching appearances on several occasions. Buchanan retired on November 18, 2009.

== Post-playing career ==
Buchanan was manager for the Idaho Falls Chukars of the Pioneer Baseball League in 2010 and 2011. In 2012, he was manager of the Kane County Cougars of the Class A Midwest League. In 2013, he became manager of the Lexington Legends in the Class A South Atlantic League. Buchanan was promoted to assistant hitting instructor for the Kansas City Royals for the 2017 season. He was named as the hitting coach for the Omaha Storm Chasers of the Pacific Coast League and the Triple-A affiliate for the Kansas City Royals on January 10, 2018. He remains the hitting coach for the Storm Chasers as of February 2021.

== Personal life ==
Buchanan is married to Jill Havlicek; his father-in-law was the late Basketball Hall of Fame inductee John Havlicek.
