= 2004 Cleveland Indians season =

2004 Cleveland Indians
- League: American League
- Division: Central
- Ballpark: Jacobs Field
- City: Cleveland, Ohio
- Record: 80–82 (.494)
- Divisional place: 3rd
- Owners: Larry Dolan
- General managers: Mark Shapiro
- Managers: Eric Wedge
- Television: FSN Ohio; John Sanders, Mike Hegan, Rick Manning
- Radio: WTAM; Tom Hamilton, Matt Underwood, Mike Hegan

The 2004 Cleveland Indians season was the 104th season for the franchise.

== Offseason ==
- November 13, 2003: Jason Bere was signed as a free agent with the Cleveland Indians.
- December 1, 2003: Ernie Young was signed as a free agent with the Cleveland Indians.
- January 21, 2004: Jeff D'Amico was signed as a free agent with the Cleveland Indians.

== Regular season ==
=== Season standings ===
AL Central
Team	W	L	Pct.	GB	Home	Road
Minnesota Twins	92	70	.568	—	49‍–‍32	43‍–‍38
Chicago White Sox	83	79	.512	9	46‍–‍35	37‍–‍44
Cleveland Indians	80	82	.494	12	44‍–‍37	36‍–‍45
Detroit Tigers	72	90	.444	20	38‍–‍43	34‍–‍47
Kansas City Royals	58	104	.358	34	33‍–‍47	25‍–‍57

=== Record vs. opponents ===
2004 American League record Source: MLB Standings Grid – 2004
Team	ANA	BAL	BOS	CWS	CLE	DET	KC	MIN	NYY	OAK	SEA	TB	TEX	TOR	NL
Anaheim	—	6–3	4–5	5–4	4–5	7–2	7–0	5–4	5–4	10–9	13–7	6–1	9–10	4–5	7–11
Baltimore	3–6	—	10–9	2–4	3–3	6–0	6–3	4–5	5–14	0–7	7–2	11–8	5–2	11–8	5–13
Boston	5–4	9–10	—	4–2	3–4	6–1	4–2	2–4	11–8	8–1	5–4	14–5	4–5	14–5	9–9
Chicago	4–5	4–2	2–4	—	10–9	8–11	13–6	9–10	3–4	2–7	7–2	4–2	6–3	3–4	8–10
Cleveland	5–4	3–3	4–3	9–10	—	9–10	11–8	7–12	2–4	6–3	5–4	3–3	1–8	5–2	10–8
Detroit	2–7	0–6	1–6	11–8	10–9	—	8–11	7–12	4–3	4–5	5–4	3–3	4–5	4–2	9–9
Kansas City	0–7	3–6	2–4	6–13	8–11	11–8	—	7–12	1–5	2–7	2–5	3–6	4–5	3–3	6–12
Minnesota	4–5	5–4	4–2	10–9	12–7	12–7	12–7	—	2–4	2–5	5–4	4–5	5–2	4–2	11–7
New York	4–5	14–5	8–11	4–3	4–2	3–4	5–1	4–2	—	7–2	6–3	15–4	5–4	12–7	10–8
Oakland	9–10	7–0	1–8	7–2	3–6	5–4	7–2	5–2	2–7	—	11–8	7–2	11–9	6–3	10–8
Seattle	7–13	2–7	4–5	2–7	4–5	4–5	5–2	4–5	3–6	8–11	—	2–5	7–12	2–7	9–9
Tampa Bay	1–6	8–11	5–14	2–4	3–3	3–3	6–3	5–4	4–15	2–7	5–2	—	2–7	9–9	15–3
Texas	10–9	2–5	5–4	3–6	8–1	5–4	5–4	2–5	4–5	9–11	12–7	7–2	—	7–2	10–8
Toronto	5–4	8–11	5–14	4–3	2–5	2–4	3–3	2–4	7–12	3–6	7–2	9–9	2–7	—	8–10

=== Notable transactions ===
- April 3, 2004: Milton Bradley was traded by the Cleveland Indians to the Los Angeles Dodgers for a player to be named later and Franklin Gutierrez. The Los Angeles Dodgers sent Andrew Brown (May 19, 2004) to the Cleveland Indians to complete the trade.
- April 25, 2004: Russell Branyan was traded by the Atlanta Braves to the Cleveland Indians for Scott Sturkie (minors).
- June 30, 2004: Jeff D'Amico was released by the Cleveland Indians.
- July 26, 2004: Russell Branyan was sent to the Milwaukee Brewers by the Cleveland Indians as part of a conditional deal.

=== Roster ===
2004 Cleveland Indians
Roster
Pitchers: 58 Jason Anderson; 56 Cliff Bartosh; 63 Rafael Betancourt; 64 Fernando Cabrera; 27 Jack Cressend; 55 Francisco Cruceta; 31 Jeff D'Amico; 50 Jason Davis; 58 Joey Dawley; 57 Kyle Denney; 49 Chad Durbin; 39 Scott Elarton; 53 Jeremy Guthrie; 62 Bob Howry; 36 José Jiménez; 34 Cliff Lee; 47 David Lee; 59 Matt Miller; 57 Lou Pote; 54 David Riske; 49 Jake Robbins; 53 Jeriome Robertson; 52 CC Sabathia; 61 Jason Stanford; 55 Scott Stewart; 32 Kazuhito Tadano; 37 Jake Westbrook; 24,00 Rick White; 26 Bob Wickman	Catchers: 44 Josh Bard; 15 Tim Laker; 2 Sandy Martínez; 41 Víctor Martínez; Infielders: 20 Ronnie Belliard; 1 Casey Blake; 23 Ben Broussard; 48 Travis Hafner; 8 John McDonald; 12 Lou Merloni; 16 Jhonny Peralta; 45 Josh Phelps; 7 Brandon Phillips; 13 Omar Vizquel	Outfielders: 10 Coco Crisp; 6 Alex Escobar; 9 Jody Gerut; 45 Raul González; 11 Matt Lawton; 31 Mark Little; 38 Ryan Ludwick; 24 Grady Sizemore; Other batters: 36 Ernie Young	Manager: 22 Eric Wedge; Coaches: 25 Buddy Bell (bench); 29 Jeff Datz (first base); 4 Luis Isaac (bullpen); 33 Eddie Murray (hitting); 35 Joel Skinner (third base); 43 Dan Williams (bullpen catcher); 51 Carl Willis (pitching)

== Game log ==
=== Regular season ===
2004 regular season game log: 80–82 (Home: 44–37; Away: 36–45)
April: 9–13 (Home: 5–5; Away: 4–8)

#	Date	Time (ET)	Opponent	Score	Win	Loss	Save	Time of Game	Attendance	Record	Box/ Streak
1	April 5		@ Twins	4–7 (11)	Rincon (1–0)	**Durbin** (0–1)	—		49,584	0–1	L1
2	April 6		@ Twins	6–7 (15)	Roa (1–0)	**Westbrook** (0–1)	—		19,832	0–2	L2
3	April 7		@ Twins	11–4	**Durbin** (1–1)	Lohse (0–1)	—		20,313	1–2	W1
4	April 8		@ Royals	6–1	**D'Amico** (1–0)	Affeldt (0–1)	—		14,671	2–2	W2
5	April 9		@ Royals	1–3	Grimsley (1–0)	**Cressend** (0–1)	Leskanic (1)		28,535	2–3	L1
6	April 10		@ Royals	6–7 (10)	Sullivan (1–0)	**Betancourt** (0–1)	—		21,889	2–4	L2
7	April 11		@ Royals	3–5	Sullivan (2–0)	**Jiménez** (0–1)	Leskanic (2)		16,933	2–5	L3
8	April 12		Twins	6–3	**Lee** (1–0)	Lohse (0–2)	—		42,424	3–5	W1
9	April 14		Twins	6–10	Silva (1–0)	**D'Amico** (1–1)	Rincon (1)		14,237	3–6	L1
10	April 15		Twins	0–3	Radke (2–0)	**Stanford** (0–1)	Nathan (1)		15,105	3–7	L2
11	April 16		Tigers	10–3	**Sabathia** (1–0)	Cornejo (1–1)	—		18,507	4–7	W1
12	April 17		Tigers	1–6	Maroth (2–0)	**Davis** (0–1)	—		18,155	4–8	L1
13	April 18		Tigers	9–7	**Lee** (2–0)	Bonderman (1–1)	**Riske** (1)		19,240	5–8	W1
14	April 19		Tigers	4–10	Levine (1–0)	**Betancourt** (0–2)	—		13,650	5–9	L1
15	April 20		Royals	5–15	Anderson (1–0)	**Durbin** (1–2)	—		13,563	5–10	L2
–	April 21		Royals	Postponed (rain, makeup July 24)							
16	April 22		Royals	5–4	**Betancourt** (1–2)	Grimsley (1–1)	**Riske** (2)		15,720	6–10	W1
17	April 23		@ Tigers	3–17	Bonderman (2–1)	**Davis** (0–2)	Yan (1)		22,008	6–11	L1
18	April 24		@ Tigers	2–5	Urbina (1–0)	**Stewart** (0–1)	—		20,913	6–12	L2
19	April 25		@ Tigers	3–2	**Westbrook** (1–1)	Johnson (1–4)	—		17,253	7–12	W1
20	April 27		@ White Sox	11–7 (10)	**Betancourt** (2–2)	Adkins (2–1)	—		14,572	8–12	W2
21	April 28		@ White Sox	8–9	Jackson (1–0)	**Betancourt** (2–3)	—		12,189	8–13	L1
22	April 30		Orioles	11–2	**Lee** (3–0)	Ponson (2–2)	—		18,782	9–13	W1

May: 13–13 (Home: 11–6; Away: 2–7)

#	Date	Time (ET)	Opponent	Score	Win	Loss	Save	Time of Game	Attendance	Record	Box/ Streak
23	May 1		Orioles	3–2 (13)	**Durbin** (2–2)	DeJean (0–2)	—		17,275	10–13	W2
–	May 2		Orioles	Postponed (rain, makeup June 14)							
24	May 3	7:06 p.m. EDT	Red Sox	2–1	**Westbrook** (2–1)	Schilling (3–2)	**Betancourt** (1)	2:52	16,285	11–13	W3
25	May 4	7:06 p.m. EDT	Red Sox	7–6	**Davis** (1–2)	Lowe (3–2)	**Betancourt** (2)	2:50	16,070	12–13	W4
26	May 5	7:06 p.m. EDT	Red Sox	5–9	Arroyo (1–1)	**D'Amico** (1–2)	—	3:17	17,370	12–14	L1
27	May 6	7:04 p.m. EDT	Red Sox	2–5	Martinez (4–2)	**Sabathia** (1–1)	Foulke (6)	2:37	26,825	12–15	L2
28	May 7		@ Orioles	2–3 (10)	Julio (1–0)	**Durbin** (2–3)	—		34,324	12–16	L3
29	May 8		@ Orioles	7–10	Parrish (3–1)	**Stewart** (0–2)	Julio (4)		30,687	12–17	L4
30	May 9		@ Orioles	11–12	Lopez (3–1)	**Riske** (0–1)	Julio (5)		35,778	12–18	L5
31	May 10	7:07 p.m. EDT	@ Red Sox	10–6	**Durbin** (3–3)	Kim (1–1)	—	3:38	35,257	13–18	W1
32	May 11	7:05 p.m. EDT	@ Red Sox	3–5	Embree (1–0)	**Jiménez** (0–2)	Foulke (7)	2:32	35,401	13–19	L1
33	May 12	7:06 p.m. EDT	@ Red Sox	6–4	**Lee** (4–0)	Wakefield (2–2)	—	2:49	35,371	14–19	W1
34	May 14		Devil Rays	8–7 (10)	**White** (1–0)	Carter (1–2)	—		19,796	15–19	W2
35	May 15		Devil Rays	9–7	**Westbrook** (3–1)	Zambrano (3–4)	—		18,040	16–19	W3
36	May 16		Devil Rays	10–0	**Sabathia** (2–1)	Waechter (1–4)	—		19,499	17–19	W4
37	May 17		White Sox	7–2	**Lee** (5–0)	Diaz (0–1)	—		15,617	18–19	W5
38	May 18		White Sox	2–4	Garland (3–2)	**Durbin** (3–4)	Koch (7)		15,298	18–20	L1
39	May 19		White Sox	3–15	Schoeneweis (4–1)	**Davis** (1–3)	—		17,205	18–21	L2
40	May 21		@ Devil Rays	3–5	Miller (1–1)	**Sabathia** (2–2)	Baez (6)		10,213	18–22	L3
41	May 22		@ Devil Rays	3–6	Waechter (2–4)	**Westbrook** (3–2)	Sosa (1)		12,008	18–23	L4
42	May 23		@ Devil Rays	4–5 (10)	Harper (1–0)	**Riske** (0–2)	—		10,555	18–24	L5
43	May 25		Mariners	4–5 (12)	Myers (2–1)	**Jiménez** (0–3)	Guardado (7)		15,349	18–25	L6
44	May 26		Mariners	3–7	Moyer (3–2)	**Sabathia** (2–3)	Guardado (8)		16,007	18–26	L7
45	May 27		Mariners	9–5	**Westbrook** (4–2)	Meche (1–5)	—		17,272	19–26	W1
46	May 28		Athletics	1–0	**Jiménez** (1–3)	Mecir (0–4)	—		19,257	20–26	W2
47	May 29		Athletics	8–6	**Riske** (1–2)	Rhodes (1–2)	**Jiménez** (1)		26,441	21–26	W3
48	May 30		Athletics	4–3	**White** (2–0)	Rhodes (1–3)	—		24,005	22–26	W4

June: 15–13 (Home: 7–5; Away: 8–8)

#	Date	Time (ET)	Opponent	Score	Win	Loss	Save	Time of Game	Attendance	Record	Box/ Streak
49	June 1		Rangers	5–6 (12)	Ramirez (3–2)	**White** (2–1)	Cordero (17)		17,136	22–27	L1
50	June 2		Rangers	3–5	Almanzar (5–0)	**Betancourt** (2–4)	Cordero (18)		18,098	22–28	L2
51	June 3		@ Angels	2–5	Escobar (4–2)	**Lee** (5–1)	—		39,353	22–29	L3
52	June 4		@ Angels	9–6	**Riske** (2–2)	Rodríguez (1–1)	**Jiménez** (2)	Angel Stadium of Anaheim	43,590	23–29	W1
53	June 5		@ Angels	3–2	**White** (3–1)	Lackey (3–7)	**Jiménez** (3)		43,514	24–29	W2
54	June 6		@ Angels	7–0	**Sabathia** (3–3)	Colón (4–4)	—		43,337	25–29	W3
55	June 8		Marlins	5–7	Bump (1–3)	**Jiménez** (1–4)	Benitez (23)		21,252	25–30	L1
56	June 9		Marlins	8–1	**Westbrook** (5–2)	Burnett (0–2)	—		17,072	26–30	W1
57	June 10		Marlins	1–4	Pavano (6–2)	**Davis** (1–4)	Benitez (24)		19,113	26–31	L1
58	June 11		Reds	6–5 (11)	**Riske** (3–2)	Norton (0–1)	—		27,308	27–31	W1
59	June 12		Reds	8–7	**Betancourt** (3–4)	Norton (0–2)	**Jiménez** (4)		42,101	28–31	W2
60	June 13		Reds	10–8	**Miller** (1–0)	Reith (2–2)	**Jiménez** (5)		31,235	29–31	W3
61	June 14		Orioles	14–0	**Westbrook** (6–2)	DuBose (4–5)	—		19,340	30–31	W4
62	June 15		@ Mets	2–7	Trachsel (6–5)	**Davis** (1–5)	—		22,783	30–32	L1
63	June 16		@ Mets	9–1	**Sabathia** (4–3)	Ginter (1–1)	—		29,512	31–32	W1
64	June 17		@ Mets	2–6	Bottalico (3–1)	**White** (3–2)	—		17,675	31–33	L1
65	June 18		@ Braves	4–2	**Lee** (6–1)	Hampton (1–7)	**Jiménez** (6)		28,000	32–33	W1
66	June 19		@ Braves	0–4	Byrd (1–0)	**Westbrook** (6–3)	Smoltz (11)		41,987	32–34	L1
67	June 20		@ Braves	5–2	**Davis** (2–5)	Ortiz (6–6)	**Jiménez** (7)		31,000	33–34	W1
68	June 21		@ White Sox	5–1	**Sabathia** (5–3)	Schoeneweis (5–6)	—		29,722	34–34	W2
69	June 22		@ White Sox	9–11 (10)	Takatsu (4–0)	**Jiménez** (1–5)	—		27,922	34–35	L1
70	June 23		@ White Sox	9–5	**Lee** (7–1)	Buehrle (7–2)	—		21,654	35–35	W1
71	June 24		@ White Sox	1–7	Rauch (1–1)	**Westbrook** (6–4)	—		20,744	35–36	L1
72	June 25	Rockies	8–10 (10)	Reed (1–1)	**Jiménez** (1–6)	Chacon (16)	**Jacobs Field**	22,642	35–37	L2	
73	June 26	Rockies	4–3 (12)	**Robertson** (1–0)	Reed (1–2)	—	**Jacobs Field**	29,124	36–37	W1	
74	June 27	Rockies	5–3	**Miller** (2–0)	Jennings (6–7)	**Jiménez** (8)	**Jacobs Field**	27,252	37–37	W2	
75	June 29		@ Tigers	7–9 (11)	Dingman (2–1)	**Jiménez** (1–7)	—		30,457	37–38	L1
76	June 30		@ Tigers	5–12	Robertson (7–3)	**Davis** (2–6)	—		27,665	37–39	L2

July: 16–12 (Home: 9–7; Away: 7–5)

#	Date	Time (ET)	Opponent	Score	Win	Loss	Save	Time of Game	Attendance	Record	Box/ Streak
77	July 1		@ Tigers	7–6 (10)	**Riske** (4–2)	Urbina (3–3)	**White** (1)		25,159	38–39	W1
78	July 2		@ Reds	15–2	**Tadano** (1–0)	Sanchez (0–1)	—		36,156	39–39	W2
79	July 3		@ Reds	2–4	Wilson (8–2)	**Elarton** (0–7)	Graves (31)		38,708	39–40	L1
80	July 4		@ Reds	4–5 (11)	Jones (6–2)	**White** (3–3)	—		30,375	39–41	L2
81	July 5		Rangers	5–8	Rogers (12–2)	**Sabathia** (5–4)	Cordero (25)		25,363	39–42	L3
82	July 6		Rangers	4–1	**Lee** (8–1)	Bierbrodt (1–1)	**Riske** (3)		16,796	40–42	W1
83	July 7		Rangers	8–9	Mahay (2–0)	**Robertson** (1–1)	Cordero (26)		18,499	40–43	L1
84	July 8		Rangers	9–10	Rodriguez (2–0)	**Elarton** (0–8)	—		24,914	40–44	L2
85	July 9		Athletics	5–4	**Howry** (1–0)	Dotel (1–5)	—		24,325	41–44	W1
86	July 10		Athletics	7–15	Mulder (12–2)	**White** (3–4)	—		28,448	41–45	L1
87	July 11		Athletics	4–1	**Lee** (9–1)	Zito (4–7)	**Riske** (4)		24,622	42–45	W1
ASG	July 13	8:46 p.m. EDT	75th All-Star Game in Houston, TX	9 – 4 NL	—	—	—	2:59	41,886	—	ASG
88	July 15		@ Mariners	1–2	Pineiro (5–10)	**Westbrook** (6–5)	Guardado (16)		32,896	42–46	L1
89	July 16		@ Mariners	18–6	**Lee** (10–1)	Blackley (1–2)	—		32,578	43–46	W1
90	July 17		@ Mariners	6–5	**Sabathia** (6–4)	Franklin (3–8)	**Riske** (5)		36,154	44–46	W2
91	July 18		@ Mariners	5–7	Hasegawa (3–3)	**Miller** (2–1)	Guardado (17)		37,363	44–47	L1
92	July 19		@ Angels	8–5 (10)	**Riske** (5–2)	Percival (2–2)	**Miller** (1)		42,986	45–47	W1
93	July 20		@ Angels	14–5	**Westbrook** (7–5)	Washburn (10–5)	—		40,000	46–47	W2
94	July 21		White Sox	0–14	Buehrle (10–3)	**Lee** (10–2)	—		21,922	46–48	L1
95	July 22		White Sox	0–3	Garcia (8–8)	**Sabathia** (6–5)	Takatsu (7)		23,168	46–49	L2
96	July 23		Royals	3–2 (11)	**White** (4–4)	Field (2–2)	—		26,504	47–49	W1
97	July 24 (1)		Royals	10–2	**Durbin** (4–4)	George (1–2)	—		18,873	48–49	W2
98	July 24 (2)		Royals	4–3	**Miller** (3–1)	Sullivan (3–3)	—		27,865	49–49	W3
99	July 25		Royals	5–1	**Westbrook** (8–5)	Greinke (2–8)	—		23,540	50–49	W4
100	July 26		Tigers	4–13	Maroth (8–7)	**Lee** (10–3)	—		18,359	50–50	L1
101	July 27		Tigers	10–6	**Sabathia** (7–5)	Knotts (5–6)	—		19,090	51–50	W1
102	July 28		Tigers	5–4	**Elarton** (1–8)	Walker (1–4)	**Wickman** (1)		23,213	52–50	W2
103	July 30		@ Royals	7–6 (11)	**Betancourt** (4–4)	Sullivan (3–4)	—		32,079	53–50	W3
104	July 31		@ Royals	3–10	Greinke (3–8)	**Tadano** (1–1)	—		27,689	53–51	L1

August: 14–15 (Home: 8–5; Away: 6–10)

#	Date	Time (ET)	Opponent	Score	Win	Loss	Save	Time of Game	Attendance	Record	Box/ Streak
105	August 1		@ Royals	7–8	May (8–11)	**Sabathia** (7–6)	Camp (2)		15,641	53–52	L2
106	August 2		@ Blue Jays	1–6	Lilly (8–7)	**Lee** (10–4)	—		17,549	53–53	L3
107	August 3		@ Blue Jays	6–7	Speier (3–6)	**Betancourt** (4–5)	Frasor (14)		15,025	53–54	L4
108	August 4		@ Blue Jays	14–5	**Westbrook** (9–5)	Towers (6–4)	—		15,675	54–54	W1
109	August 5		@ Blue Jays	6–3 (10)	**Betancourt** (5–5)	Ligtenberg (1–4)	**Wickman** (2)		30,037	55–54	W2
110	August 6		@ White Sox	3–2	**Sabathia** (8–6)	Buehrle (10–5)	**Wickman** (3)		23,811	56–54	W3
111	August 7		@ White Sox	6–5	**Miller** (4–1)	Takatsu (4–3)	**Wickman** (4)		32,790	57–54	W4
112	August 8		@ White Sox	2–3	Takatsu (5–3)	**Betancourt** (5–6)	—		25,897	57–55	L1
113	August 9		@ White Sox	13–11	**Westbrook** (10–5)	Diaz (1–3)	—		31,116	58–55	W1
114	August 10		Blue Jays	2–0	**Durbin** (5–4)	Bush (1–3)	**Wickman** (5)		19,942	59–55	W2
115	August 11		Blue Jays	3–2	**Sabathia** (9–6)	Frederick (0–1)	**Wickman** (6)		23,696	60–55	W3
116	August 12		Blue Jays	6–2	**Riske** (6–2)	Ligtenberg (1–5)	—		22,734	61–55	W4
117	August 13		Twins	8–2	**Elarton** (2–8)	Silva (10–8)	—		30,101	62–55	W5
118	August 14		Twins	7–1	**Westbrook** (11–5)	Lohse (5–10)	—		40,942	63–55	W6
119	August 15		Twins	2–4 (10)	Rincon (10–5)	**White** (4–5)	Nathan (34)		38,019	63–56	L1
120	August 16		@ Rangers	2–5	Ramirez (4–3)	**Sabathia** (9–7)	Cordero (36)		23,551	63–57	L2
121	August 17		@ Rangers	4–16	Erickson (1–3)	**Lee** (10–5)	Brocail (1)		24,864	63–58	L3
122	August 18		@ Rangers	2–5	Rogers (15–5)	**Elarton** (2–9)	Cordero (37)		31,572	63–59	L4
123	August 20		@ Twins	1–5	Lohse (6–10)	**Westbrook** (11–6)	—		25,157	63–60	L5
124	August 21		@ Twins	1–8	Mulholland (4–6)	**Durbin** (5–5)	—		27,945	63–61	L6
125	August 22		@ Twins	3–7	Radke (9–6)	**Sabathia** (9–8)	—		28,587	63–62	L7
126	August 23		Yankees	4–6	Gordon (5–3)	**Wickman** (0–1)	Rivera (42)		33,172	63–63	L8
127	August 24		Yankees	4–5	Gordon (6–3)	**Wickman** (0–2)	Rivera (43)		31,729	63–64	L9
128	August 25		Yankees	4–3	**Riske** (7–2)	Gordon (6–4)	**Betancourt** (3)		30,605	64–64	W1
129	August 26		White Sox	9–14	Cotts (2–3)	**Durbin** (5–6)	—		30,049	64–65	L1
130	August 27		White Sox	6–3	**Sabathia** (10–8)	Grilli (0–1)	**Wickman** (7)		30,527	65–65	W1
131	August 28		White Sox	3–5	Contreras (12–6)	**Lee** (10–6)	Takatsu (13)		37,374	65–66	L1
132	August 29		White Sox	9–0	**Elarton** (3–9)	Garland (9–10)	—		32,834	66–66	W1
133	August 31		@ Yankees	22–0	**Westbrook** (12–6)	Vazquez (13–8)	—		51,777	67–66	W2

September: 12–14 (Home: 4–9; Away: 8–5)

#	Date	Time (ET)	Opponent	Score	Win	Loss	Save	Time of Game	Attendance	Record	Box/ Streak
134	September 1		@ Yankees	3–5	Hernandez (6–0)	**Sabathia** (10–9)	Rivera (46)		41,448	67–67	L1
135	September 2		@ Yankees	1–9	Lieber (10–8)	**Lee** (10–7)	—		37,963	67–68	L2
136	September 3		Angels	5–10	Escobar (9–9)	**Elarton** (3–10)	—		20,994	67–69	L3
137	September 4		Angels	1–6	Washburn (11–5)	**Davis** (2–7)	—		23,786	67–70	L4
138	September 5		Angels	1–2	Lackey (12–11)	**Westbrook** (12–7)	Rodríguez (11)		26,208	67–71	L5
139	September 6		@ Mariners	6–0	**Sabathia** (11–9)	Meche (4–6)	—		33,084	68–71	W1
140	September 8		@ Mariners	9–5	**Lee** (11–7)	Baek (1–2)	—		28,764	69–71	W2
141	September 10		@ Athletics	4–3 (12)	**White** (5–5)	Duchscherer (5–6)	**Wickman** (8)		24,154	70–71	W3
142	September 11		@ Athletics	4–5	Rincon (1–0)	**Howry** (1–1)	Dotel (33)		30,436	70–72	L1
143	September 12		@ Athletics	0–1	Zito (11–10)	**Westbrook** (12–8)	Dotel (34)		29,107	70–73	L2
144	September 14		Tigers	3–11	Bonderman (10–11)	**Denney** (0–1)	—		16,489	70–74	L3
145	September 15		Tigers	5–3	**Howry** (2–1)	Yan (2–4)	**Wickman** (9)		15,411	71–74	W1
146	September 16		Tigers	4–6	Walker (3–4)	**Sabathia** (11–10)	Yan (4)		15,943	71–75	L1
147	September 17		Royals	4–6	Wood (3–7)	**Westbrook** (12–9)	Affeldt (11)		14,347	71–76	L2
148	September 18		Royals	1–7	Gobble (8–8)	**Lee** (11–8)	—		17,848	72–76	L3
149	September 19		Royals	8–3	**Denney** (1–1)	Bautista (0–3)	—		16,745	72–77	W1
150	September 20		@ Tigers	1–3	Maroth (11–11)	**Elarton** (3–11)	Yan (5)		13,820	72–78	L1
151	September 21		@ Tigers	8–7	**Howry** (3–1)	Yan (3–5)	**Wickman** (10)		11,351	73–78	W1
152	September 22		@ Tigers	7–6	**Westbrook** (13–9)	Ledezma (4–3)	—		16,360	74–78	W2
153	September 23		Twins	9–7	**Lee** (12–8)	Durbin (0–1)	**Betancourt** (4)		18,053	75–78	W3
154	September 24		Twins	2–8	Santana (20–6)	**Denney** (1–2)	—		16,253	75–79	L1
155	September 25		Twins	5–3	**Howry** (4–1)	Romero (7–3)	**Wickman** (11)		23,541	76–79	W1
156	September 26		Twins	2–6	Silva (14–8)	**Cruceta** (0–1)	—		22,091	76–80	L1
157	September 27		@ Royals	6–1	**Westbrook** (14–9)	Cerda (1–3)	—		11,544	77–80	W1
156	September 28		@ Royals	5–1	**Lee** (13–8)	May (9–19)	—		11,847	78–80	W2
159	September 29		@ Royals	5–2	**Bartosh** (1–0)	Wood (3–8)	**Wickman** (12)		11,193	79–80	W3

October: 1–2 (Home: 0–0; Away: 1–2)

#	Date	Time (ET)	Opponent	Score	Win	Loss	Save	Time of Game	Attendance	Record	Box/ Streak
160	October 1		@ Twins	3–4	Crain (3–0)	**Howry** (4–2)	Nathan (44)	]	25,322	79–81	L1
–	October 2		@ Twins	Suspended (pre-determined stopping time, continuation October 3)							
161	October 3		@ Twins	5–6 (12)	Lohse (9–12)	**Riske** (7–3)	—		32,268	79–82	L2
162	October 3		@ Twins	5–2	**Lee** (14–8)	Lohse (9–13)	**Wickman** (13)		28,624	80–82	W1

Legend: = Win = Loss = Eliminated from playoff race = Postponement
Bold = Indians team member

=== Detailed records ===
**American League**
Opponent	Home	Away	Total	Pct.	Runs scored	Runs allowed
**AL East**
Boston Red Sox	2–2	2–1	4–3	.571	35	36
	**2–2**	**2–1**	**4–3**	**.571**	**35**	**36**
**AL Central**
**Cleveland Indians**	—	—	—	—	—	—
	**0–0**	**0–0**	**0–0**	–	**0**	**0**
**AL West**
	**0–0**	**0–0**	**0–0**	–	**0**	**0**
**League Total**	**2–2**	**2–1**	**4–3**	**.571**	**35**	**36**

**National League**
Opponent	Home	Away	Total	Pct.	Runs scored	Runs allowed
**NL East**
	**0–0**	**0–0**	**0–0**	–	**0**	**0**
**NL Central**
	**0–0**	**0–0**	**0–0**	–	**0**	**0**
**NL West**
	**0–0**	**0–0**	**0–0**	–	**0**	**0**
	**0–0**	**0–0**	**0–0**	–	**0**	**0**
**Total**	**2–2**	**2–1**	**4–3**	**.571**	**35**	**36**

== Player stats ==
=== Batting ===
Note: G = Games played; AB = At bats; R = Runs scored; H = Hits; 2B = Doubles; 3B = Triples; HR = Home runs; RBI = Runs batted in; AVG = Batting average; SB = Stolen bases

Player	G	AB	R	H	2B	3B	HR	RBI	AVG	SB
Josh Bard	7	19	5	8	2	0	1	4	.421	0
Cliff Bartosh	2	0	0	0	0	0	0	0	—	0
Ronnie Belliard	152	599	78	169	48	1	12	70	.282	3
Rafael Betancourt	3	0	0	0	0	0	0	0	—	0
Casey Blake	152	587	93	159	36	3	28	88	.271	5
Ben Broussard	139	418	57	115	28	5	17	82	.275	4
Coco Crisp	139	491	78	146	24	2	15	71	.297	20
Jason Davis	2	5	1	1	0	0	1	1	.200	0
Scott Elarton	2	3	1	1	0	0	0	0	.333	0
Alex Escobar	46	152	20	32	8	2	1	12	.211	1
Jody Gerut	134	481	72	121	31	5	11	51	.252	13
Raul González	7	11	0	1	0	0	0	0	.091	0
Travis Hafner	140	482	96	150	41	3	28	109	.311	3
Bob Howry	1	0	0	0	0	0	0	0	—	0
Jose Jimenez	2	0	0	0	0	0	0	0	—	0
Tim Laker	43	117	12	25	2	0	3	17	.214	0
Matt Lawton	150	591	109	164	25	0	20	70	.277	23
Cliff Lee	1	3	0	1	0	0	0	0	.333	0
Mark Little	11	20	0	4	0	0	0	2	.200	0
Ryan Ludwick	15	50	3	11	2	0	2	4	.220	0
Victor Martinez	141	520	77	147	38	1	23	108	.283	0
John McDonald	66	93	17	19	5	1	2	7	.204	0
Lou Merloni	71	190	25	55	12	1	4	28	.289	1
Matt Miller	3	0	0	0	0	0	0	0	—	0
Jhonny Peralta	8	25	2	6	1	0	0	2	.240	0
Josh Phelps	24	76	13	23	6	0	5	10	.303	0
Brandon Phillips	6	22	1	4	2	0	0	1	.182	0
David Riske	4	0	0	0	0	0	0	0	—	0
Jeriome Robertson	2	0	0	0	0	0	0	0	—	0
CC Sabathia	1	4	0	1	0	0	0	0	.250	0
Grady Sizemore	43	138	15	34	6	2	4	24	.246	2
Kaz Tadano	2	3	1	1	0	0	0	0	.333	0
Omar Vizquel	148	567	82	165	28	3	7	59	.291	19
Jake Westbrook	2	3	0	0	0	0	0	0	.000	0
Rick White	6	0	0	0	0	0	0	0	—	0
Ernie Young	3	4	0	2	0	0	0	0	.500	0
Team totals	162	5674	848	1565	345	29	184	820	.276	94

=== Pitching ===
Note: W = Wins; L = Losses; ERA = Earned run average; G = Games pitched; GS = Games started; SV = Saves; IP = Innings pitched; H = Hits allowed; R = Runs allowed; ER = Earned runs allowed; BB = Walks allowed; K = Strikeouts

Player	W	L	ERA	G	GS	SV	IP	H	R	ER	BB	K
Jason Anderson	0	0	45.00	1	0	0	1.0	1	5	5	4	1
Cliff Bartosh	1	0	4.66	34	0	0	19.1	22	10	10	11	25
Rafael Betancourt	5	6	3.92	68	0	4	66.2	71	32	29	18	76
Fernando Cabrera	0	0	3.38	4	0	0	5.1	3	3	2	1	6
Jack Cressend	0	1	6.32	11	0	0	15.2	22	11	11	10	8
Francisco Cruceta	0	1	9.39	2	2	0	7.2	10	9	8	4	9
Jeff D'Amico	1	2	7.63	7	7	0	30.2	45	29	26	6	16
Jason Davis	2	7	5.51	26	19	0	114.1	148	81	70	51	72
Joe Dawley	0	0	5.40	2	2	0	8.1	7	5	5	7	8
Kyle Denney	1	2	9.56	4	4	0	16.0	32	17	17	8	13
Chad Durbin	5	6	6.66	17	8	0	51.1	63	40	38	24	38
Scott Elarton	3	5	4.53	21	21	0	117.1	107	62	59	42	80
Jeremy Guthrie	0	0	4.63	6	0	0	11.2	9	6	6	6	7
Bob Howry	4	2	2.74	37	0	0	42.2	37	14	13	12	39
Jose Jimenez	1	7	8.42	31	0	8	36.1	45	37	34	14	21
Tim Laker	0	0	0.00	1	0	0	1.0	1	0	0	1	0
Cliff Lee	14	8	5.43	33	33	0	179.0	188	113	108	81	161
David Lee	0	0	10.38	4	0	0	4.1	8	7	5	4	4
Matt Miller	4	1	3.09	57	0	1	55.1	42	22	19	23	55
Lou Pote	0	0	9.00	2	0	0	3.0	3	3	3	1	5
David Riske	7	3	3.72	72	0	5	77.1	69	32	32	41	78
Jake Robbins	0	0	5.40	2	0	0	1.2	3	1	1	0	0
Jeriome Robertson	1	1	12.21	8	0	0	14.0	22	22	19	9	6
CC Sabathia	11	10	4.12	30	30	0	188.0	176	90	86	72	139
Jason Stanford	0	1	0.82	2	2	0	11.0	12	1	1	5	5
Scott Stewart	0	2	7.24	23	0	0	13.2	23	14	11	6	18
Kaz Tadano	1	1	4.65	14	4	0	50.1	55	30	26	18	39
Jake Westbrook	14	9	3.38	33	30	0	215.2	208	95	81	61	116
Rick White	5	5	5.29	59	0	1	78.1	88	52	46	29	44
Bob Wickman	0	2	4.25	30	0	13	29.2	33	14	14	10	26
Team totals	80	82	4.82	162	162	32	1466.2	1553	857	785	579	1115

== Awards and honors ==
All-Star Game

== Minor league affiliates ==
Classification level	Team	League
AAA	Buffalo Bisons	International League
AA	Akron Aeros	Eastern League
Advanced A	Kinston Indians	Carolina League
A	Lake County Captains	South Atlantic League
Short Season A	Mahoning Valley Scrappers	New York–Penn League
Rookie	Burlington Indians	Appalachian League
