= 2006 Cleveland Indians season =

2006 Cleveland Indians
- League: American League
- Division: Central
- Ballpark: Jacobs Field
- City: Cleveland, Ohio
- Record: 78–84 (.481)
- Divisional place: 4th
- Owners: Larry Dolan
- General managers: Mark Shapiro
- Managers: Eric Wedge
- Television: SportsTime Ohio (John Sanders, Rick Manning, Mike Hegan); WKYC (Jim Donovan, Rick Manning, Mike Hegan)
- Radio: WTAM · WMMS; Cleveland Indians Radio Network (Tom Hamilton, Matt Underwood, Mike Hegan)

The 2006 Cleveland Indians season was the 106th season for the franchise. It began with the Cleveland Indians attempting to win the American League Central and make the playoffs. The Indians finished with a mediocre 78–84 record and missed the playoffs. It was the final season before Progressive bought the naming rights to then-Jacobs Field.

== Offseason ==
- December 7, 2005: Paul Byrd was signed as a free agent with the Cleveland Indians.
- January 6, 2006: Todd Hollandsworth was signed as a free agent with the Cleveland Indians.

== Regular season ==
On September 2, 2006, Kevin Kouzmanoff became the 23rd Major Leaguer to hit a home run in his first Major League at bat, the 12th American Leaguer to do so, and the second of 2006 (along with Adam Wainwright of the St. Louis Cardinals). He was only the third player to have the home run be a grand slam. Kouzmanoff is only one of two players in Major League Baseball history to hit a grand slam on his first pitch ever seen in the Major Leagues, along with Daniel Nava. The pitcher who gave up the hit was Edinson Vólquez.

=== Season standings ===
AL Central
Team	W	L	Pct.	GB	Home	Road
Minnesota Twins	96	66	.593	—	54‍–‍27	42‍–‍39
Detroit Tigers	95	67	.586	1	46‍–‍35	49‍–‍32
Chicago White Sox	90	72	.556	6	49‍–‍32	41‍–‍40
Cleveland Indians	78	84	.481	18	44‍–‍37	34‍–‍47
Kansas City Royals	62	100	.383	34	34‍–‍47	28‍–‍53

=== Record vs. opponents ===
2006 American League record Source: MLB Standings Grid – 2006
Team	BAL	BOS	CWS	CLE	DET	KC	LAA	MIN	NYY	OAK	SEA	TB	TEX	TOR	NL
Baltimore	—	3–15	2–5	4–2	3–3	5–1	4–6	3–6	7–12	2–4	4–6	13–6	3–6	8–11	9–9
Boston	15–3	—	4–2	3–4	3–3	4–5	3–3	1–5	8–11	3–7	4–6	10–9	5–4	7–12	16–2
Chicago	5–2	2–4	—	8–11	12–7	11–8	6–3	9–10	2–4	3–3	5–4	3–3	5–5	5–4	14–4
Cleveland	2–4	4–3	11–8	—	6–13	10–8	4–5	8–11	3–4	3–6	4–5	6–1	5–4	4–2	8–10
Detroit	3–3	3–3	7–12	13–6	—	14–4	3–5	11–8	2–5	5–4	6–3	5–3	5–5	3–3	15–3
Kansas City	1–5	5–4	8–11	8–10	4–14	—	3–7	7–12	2–7	4–5	3–5	1–5	3–3	3–4	10–8
Los Angeles	6–4	3–3	3–6	5–4	5–3	7–3	—	4–2	6–4	11–8	10–9	7–2	11–8	4–6	7–11
Minnesota	6–3	5–1	10–9	11–8	8–11	12–7	2–4	—	3–3	6–4	5–3	6–1	4–5	2–5	16–2
New York	12–7	11–8	4–2	4–3	5–2	7–2	4–6	3–3	—	3–6	3–3	13–5	8–2	10–8	10–8
Oakland	4–2	7–3	3–3	6–3	4–5	5–4	8–11	4–6	6–3	—	17–2	6–3	9–10	6–4	8–10
Seattle	6–4	6–4	4–5	5–4	3–6	5–3	9–10	3–5	3–3	2–17	—	6–3	8–11	4–5	14–4
Tampa Bay	6–13	9–10	3–3	1–6	3–5	5–1	2–7	1–6	5–13	3–6	3–6	—	3–6	6–12	11–7
Texas	6–3	4–5	5–5	4–5	5–5	3–3	8–11	5–4	2–8	10–9	11–8	6–3	—	4–2	7–11
Toronto	11–8	12–7	4–5	2–4	3–3	4–3	6–4	5–2	8–10	4–6	5–4	12–6	2–4	—	9–9

=== Transactions ===
- April 7, 2006: Brandon Phillips was traded by the Cleveland Indians to the Cincinnati Reds for a player to be named later. The Cincinnati Reds sent Jeff Stevens (minors) (June 13, 2006) to the Cleveland Indians to complete the trade.
- July 20, 2006: Bob Wickman was traded by the Cleveland Indians to the Atlanta Braves for Max Ramirez (minors).
- July 26, 2006: Ben Broussard was traded by the Cleveland Indians with cash to the Seattle Mariners for a player to be named later and Shin-Soo Choo. The Seattle Mariners sent Shawn Nottingham (minors) (August 24, 2006) to the Cleveland Indians to complete the trade.
- August 9, 2006: Todd Hollandsworth was purchased by the Cincinnati Reds from the Cleveland Indians.

=== Roster ===
2006 Cleveland Indians
Roster
Pitchers: 63 Rafael Betancourt; 58 Andrew Brown; 36 Paul Byrd; 56 Fernando Cabrera; 55 Fausto Carmona; 50 Jason Davis; 32 Danny Graves; 57 Jeremy Guthrie; 16 Jason Johnson; 46 Juan Lara; 31 Cliff Lee; 47 Tom Mastny; 40 Matt Miller; 59 Guillermo Mota; 49 Edward Mujica; 53 Rafael Pérez; 52 CC Sabathia; 47 Scott Sauerbeck; 44 Brian Sikorski; 54 Brian Slocum; 45 Jeremy Sowers; 37 Jake Westbrook; 26 Bob Wickman	Catchers: 13 Tim Laker; 41 Víctor Martínez; 10 Kelly Shoppach; Infielders: 20 Ronnie Belliard; 17 Aaron Boone; 23 Ben Broussard; 25 Ryan Garko; 48 Travis Hafner; 7 Joe Inglett; 11 Kevin Kouzmanoff; 27 Héctor Luna; 30 Andy Marte; 12 Lou Merloni; 2 Jhonny Peralta; 33 Eduardo Pérez; 15 Ramón Vázquez	Outfielders: 1 Casey Blake; 16 Shin-Soo Choo; 38 Franklin Gutiérrez; 28 Todd Hollandsworth; 8 Jason Michaels; 24 Grady Sizemore	Manager: 22 Eric Wedge; Coaches: 29 Jeff Datz (third base); 4 Luis Isaac (bullpen); 6 Luis Rivera (first base); 39 Derek Shelton (hitting); 35 Joel Skinner (bench); 51 Carl Willis (pitching)

=== Game log ===
2006 game log
April: 13–12

#	Date	Opponent	Score	Win	Loss	Save	Attendance	Record
1	April 2	@ White Sox	10–4	McCarthy (1–0)	Cabrera (0–1)		38,802	0–1
2	April 4	@ White Sox	8–2	Westbrook (1–0)	García (0–1)		37,591	1–1
3	April 5	@ White Sox	4–3	Graves (1–0)	Cotts (0–1)	Wickman (1)	33,586	2–1
4	April 7	Twins	11–6	Byrd (1–0)	Lohse (0–1)		42,445	3–1
5	April 8	Twins	3–0	Johnson (1–0)	Baker (0–1)	Wickman (2)	25,107	4–1
6	April 9	Twins	3–2	Westbrook (2–0)	Santana (0–2)	Wickman (3)	23,311	5–1
7	April 11	Mariners	9–5	Lee (1–0)	Washburn (1–1)		17,559	6–1
8	April 12	Mariners	11–9	Woods (1–0)	Byrd (1–1)	Guardado (1)	14,773	6–2
9	April 13	Mariners	9–5	Mateo (1–0)	Sauerbeck (0–1)	Putz (2)	24,638	6–3
10	April 14	@ Tigers	5–1	Rogers (2–1)	Westbrook (2–1)		27,358	6–4
11	April 15	@ Tigers	7–2	Carmona (1–0)	Bonderman (1–2)		30,107	7–4
12	April 16	@ Tigers	1–0	Maroth (2–0)	Lee (1–1)	Rodney (3)	14,303	7–5
13	April 17	@ Tigers	10–2	Byrd (2–1)	Robertson (1–2)		19,126	8–5
14	April 18	@ Orioles	15–1	Johnson (2–0)	Chen (0–2)		17,354	9–5
15	April 19	@ Orioles	18–9	Halama (1–0)	Westbrook (2–2)		19,510	9–6
16	April 20	@ Orioles	9–4	Bédard (4–0)	Carmona (1–1)		22,031	9–7
17	April 21	@ Royals	6–5	Graves (2–0)	Dessens (1–1)	Wickman (4)	16,791	10–7
18	April 22	@ Royals	11–5	Wood (2–0)	Byrd (2–2)		19,645	10–8
19	April 23	@ Royals	5–1	Affeldt (1–2)	Johnson (2–1)		12,194	10–9
20	April 25	Red Sox	8–6	Foulke (1–1)	Mota (0–1)	Papelbon (9)	18,438	10–110
21	April 26	Red Sox	7–1	Lee (2–1)	Wakefield (1–4)		21,575	11–10
22	April 27	Red Sox	15–3	Byrd (3–2)	Beckett (3–1)		26,952	12–10
23	April 28	Rangers	7–6	Davis (1–0)	Bauer (1–1)	Wickman (5)	22,106	13–10
24	April 29	Rangers	7–5	Millwood (2–2)	Carmona (1–2)	Otsuka (1)	37,496	13–11
25	April 30	Rangers	8–4	Padilla (3–1)	Davis (1–1)		22,989	13–12

May: 13–14

#	Date	Opponent	Score	Win	Loss	Save	Attendance	Record
26	May 1	White Sox	8–6	Vázquez (3–1)	Lee (2–2)	Jenks (8)	17,845	13–13
27	May 2	White Sox	7–1	Sabathia (1–0)	Buehrle (3–2)		22,630	14–13
28	May 3	@ Athletics	14–3	Byrd (4–2)	Haren (1–3)		18,248	15–13
29	May 4	@ Athletics	12–4	Saarloos (1–0)	Johnson (2–2)	Gaudin (1)	14,695	15–14
30	May 5	@ Mariners	9–4	Westbrook (3–2)	Soriano (0–1)		32,998	16–14
31	May 6	@ Mariners	4–1	Piñeiro (4–2)	Lee (2–3)	Putz (3)	28,672	16–15
32	May 7	@ Mariners	2–0	Sabathia (2–0)	Washburn (2–5)	Wickman (6)	35,562	17–15
33	May 8	@ Royals	4–3	Wood (3–0)	Byrd (4–3)	Burgos (5)	9,029	17–16
34	May 9	@ Royals	10–7	Peralta (1–0)	Graves (2–1)		14,784	17–17
35	May 10	@ Royals	10–8	Burgos (1–0)	Mota (0–2)		24,471	17–18
36	May 12	Tigers	5–4	Rogers (6–2)	Lee (2–4)	Jones (8)	23,588	17–19
37	May 13	Tigers	3–0	Bonderman (4–2)	Sabathia (2–1)	Jones (9)	24,051	17–20
38	May 14	Tigers	3–2	Maroth (5–2)	Johnson (2–3)	Rodney (6)	21,875	17–21
39	May 16	Royals	6–4	Davis (2–1)	Burgos (1–2)		15,399	18–21
40	May 17	Royals	5–0	Westbrook (4–2)	Affeldt (2–3)		15,064	19–21
41	May 18	Royals	6–5	Lee (3–4)	Hernández (1–3)	Wickman (7)	24,184	20–21
42	May 19	Pirates	4–1	Sabathia (3–1)	Duke (2–5)		32,499	21–21
43	May 20	Pirates	9–6	Snell (3–3)	Johnson (2–4)	Gonzalez (6)	30,799	21–22
44	May 21	Pirates	3–2 (10)	Wickman (1–0)	Gonzalez (1–3)		31,589	22–22
45	May 23	@ Twins	6–5 (10)	Nathan (2–0)	Mota (0–3)		19,334	22–23
46	May 24	@ Twins	11–0	Sabathia (4–1)	Radke (4–6)		22,789	23–23
47	May 26	@ Tigers	8–3	Robertson (5–3)	Westbrook (4–3)		31,241	23–24
48	May 27	@ Tigers	3–1	Verlander (7–3)	Byrd (4–4)	Jones (16)	37,102	23–25
49	May 28	@ Tigers	9–0	Johnson (3–4)	Rogers (7–3)		37,908	24–25
50	May 29	White Sox	11–0	Vázquez (6–3)	Lee (3–5)		31,803	24–26
51	May 30	White Sox	4–3	Sabathia (5–1)	Buehrle (6–3)	Wickman (8)	20,944	25–26
52	May 31	White Sox	5–0	Westbrook (5–3)	García (7–3)		21,671	26–26

June: 9–17

#	Date	Opponent	Score	Win	Loss	Save	Attendance	Record
53	June 1	White Sox	12–8	Cabrera (1–1)	Thornton (0–1)		20,846	27–26
54	June 2	Angels	10–3	Weaver (2–0)	Johnson (3–5)		22,957	27–27
55	June 3	Angels	14–2	Lee (4–5)	Escobar (5–6)		23,769	28–27
56	June 4	Angels	14–2	Lackey (4–3)	Sabathia (5–2)		19,148	28–28
57	June 6	Athletics	7–6	Zito (6–3)	Betancourt (0–1)	Street (10)	17,340	28–29
58	June 7	Athletics	11–2	Byrd (5–4)	Blanton (5–6)		20,311	29–29
59	June 8	Athletics	4–1	Loaiza (1–3)	Johnson (3–6)	Street (11)	21,099	29–30
60	June 9	@ White Sox	5–4	Thornton (1–1)	Betancourt (0–2)	Jenks (18)	33,909	29–31
61	June 10	@ White Sox	4–3 (11)	Montero (1–0)	Wickman (1–1)		36,265	29–32
62	June 11	@ White Sox	10–8	Westbrook (6–3)	García (7–4)	Wickman (9)	34,410	30–32
63	June 13	@ Yankees	1–0	Wang (7–2)	Byrd (5–5)	Rivera (13)	50,365	30–33
64	June 14	@ Yankees	6–1	Johnson (8–5)	Johnson (3–7)		53,448	30–34
65	June 15	@ Yankees	8–4	Lee (5–5)	Mussina (8–3)		54,648	31–34
66	June 16	@ Brewers	6–4	Capuano (7–4)	Sabathia (5–3)	Turnbow (20)	33,178	31–35
67	June 17	@ Brewers	3–2	Capellán (2–0)	Wickman (1–2)		42,069	31–36
68	June 18	@ Brewers	6–3	Turnbow (4–3)	Betanourt (0–3)		43,391	31–37
69	June 19	Cubs	12–8	Marshall (4–5)	Johnson (3–8)		26,769	31–38
70	June 20	Cubs	4–2	Lee (6–5)	Maddux (7–7)	Wickman (10)	25,049	32–38
71	June 21	Cubs	9–2 (7)	Zambrano (6–3)	Sabathia (5–4)		27,182	32–39
72	June 23	Reds	3–0	Harang (8–5)	Westbrook (6–4)		32,927	32–40
73	June 24	Reds	4–0	Byrd (6–5)	Arroyo (9–4)		33,072	33–40
74	June 25	Reds	4–2	Ramírez (3–6)	Sowers (0–1)	Coffey (6)	33,139	33–41
75	June 26	@ Cardinals	10–3	Lee (7–5)	Marquis (9–6)		44,659	34–41
76	June 27	@ Cardinals	3–1	Sabathia (6–4)	Reyes (1–2)	Wickman (11)	44,446	35–41
77	June 28	@ Cardinals	5–4	Isringhausen (2–3)	Wickman (1–3)		44,628	35–42
78	June 30	@ Reds	9–8	Mercker (1–1)	Wickman (1–4)		34,930	35–43

July: 10–16

#	Date	Opponent	Score	Win	Loss	Save	Attendance	Record
79	July 1	@ Reds	12–7	Lee (8–5)	Mays (0–1)		40,692	36–43
80	July 2	@ Reds	6–3	Mota (1–3)	Weathers (3–3)	Wickman (12)	36,849	37–43
81	July 3	Yankees	5–2	Sowers (1–1)	Wang (8–4)	Wickman (13)	42,706	38–43
82	July 4	Yankees	19–1	Westbrook (7–4)	Chacón (4–3)		29,638	39–43
83	July 5	Yankees	11–3	Mussina (10–3)	Byrd (6–6)		31,265	39–44
84	July 6	Yankees	10–4	Johnson (10–7)	Lee (8–6)		34,982	39–45
85	July 7	Orioles	9–0	Sabathia (7–4)	Benson (9–7)		27,110	40–45
86	July 8	Orioles	7–4	Bédard (10–6)	Sowers (1–2)	Ray (21)	28,902	40–46
87	July 9	Orioles	5–4	Birkins (4–1)	Carmona (1–3)	Ray (22)	26,452	40–47
All-Star Break
88	July 13	@ Twins	6–4	Lee (9–6)	Liriano (10–2)	Wickman (14)	21,085	41–47
89	July 14	@ Twins	3–2 (10)	Nathan (6–0)	Mujica (0–1)		21,279	41–48
90	July 15	@ Twins	6–2	Santana (10–5)	Sabathia (7–5)		33,904	41–49
91	July 16	@ Twins	5–2	Silva (5–9)	Sowers (1–3)	Nathan (16)	31,838	41–50
92	July 17	@ Angels	10–5	Moseley (1–0)	Westbrook (7–5)		43,921	41–51
93	July 18	@ Angels	7–5	Saunders (1–0)	Lee (9–7)	Rodríguez (23)	44,020	41–52
94	July 19	@ Angels	6–4	Byrd (7–6)	Lackey (8–6)	Wickman (15)	43,744	42–52
95	July 21	Twins	14–6	Reyes (2–0)	Sabathia (7–6)		29,695	42–53
96	July 22	Twins	11–0	Sowers (2–3)	Baker (3–6)		26,895	43–53
97	July 23	Twins	3–1	Liriano (12–2)	Westbrook (7–6)	Nathan (19)	25,889	43–54
98	July 24	Tigers	9–7	Bonderman (11–4)	Lee (9–8)	Jones (26)	19,045	43–55
99	July 25	Tigers	12–7	Davis (3–1)	Rogers (11–4)		28,085	44–55
100	July 26	Tigers	4–1	Verlander (13–4)	Sabathia (7–7)	Jones (27)	31,220	44–56
101	July 28	Mariners	1–0	Sowers (3–3)	Hernández (9–9)		25,045	45–56
102	July 29	Mariners	3–1	Washburn (5–10)	Westbrook (7–7)	Putz (21)	27,876	45–57
103	July 30	Mariners	7–3	Woods (3–1)	Carmona (1–4)	Putz (22)	23,146	45–58
104	July 31	@ Red Sox	9–8	Snyder (3–2)	Carmona (1–5)		36,387	45–59

August: 18–10

#	Date	Opponent	Score	Win	Loss	Save	Attendance	Record
105	August 1	@ Red Sox	6–3	Sabathia (8–7)	Johnson (3–11)		36,328	46–59
106	August 2	@ Red Sox	6–5	Papelbon (3–1)	Carmona (1–6)		36,022	46–60
107	August 3	@ Red Sox	7–6	Westbrook (8–7)	Beckett (13–6)	Davis (1)	36,557	47–60
108	August 4	@ Tigers	7–6	Colón (2–0)	Cabrera (1–2)	Jones (30)	41,502	47–61
109	August 5	@ Tigers	4–3	Zumaya (6–1)	Carmona (1–7)		43,015	47–62
110	August 6	@ Tigers	1–0	Ledezma (2–1)	Sabathia (8–8)	Jones (31)	39,178	47–63
111	August 8	Angels	5–4	Donnelly (2–0)	Betancourt (0–4)	Rodríguez (28)	23,293	47–64
112	August 9	Angels	4–0	Westbrook (9–7)	Lackey (10–8)		18,804	48–64
113	August 10	Angels	14–2	Lee (10–8)	Santana (12–6)		24,362	49–64
114	August 11	Royals	4–3	Cabrera (2–2)	Burgos (2–5)		30,929	50–64
115	August 12	Royals	5–4	Betancourt (1–4)	Nelson (0–1)		17,079	51–64
116	August 12	Royals	6–5	Sikorski (1–0)	Gobble (3–4)		28,842	52–64
117	August 13	Royals	13–0	Sowers (4–3)	Hudson (5–4)		25,251	53–64
118	August 15	@ Twins	4–1	Santana (14–5)	Westbrook (9–8)		34,854	53–65
119	August 16	@ Twins	7–2	Neshek (2–0)	Carmona (1–8)		42,328	53–66
120	August 17	@ Twins	3–2	Byrd (8–6)	Garza (0–2)		27,664	54–66
121	August 18	@ Devil Rays	6–5	McClung (4–11)	Sikorski (1–1)		15,405	54–67
122	August 19	@ Devil Rays	5–3	Sowers (5–3)	Corcoran (4–5)	Mastny (1)	17,865	55–67
123	August 20	@ Devil Rays	9–4	Westbrook (10–8)	Orvella (1–5)		19,938	56–67
124	August 22	@ Royals	5–2	Pérez (1–1)	Lee (10–9)	Nelson (3)	13,270	56–68
125	August 23	@ Royals	15–13 (10)	Betancourt (2–4)	Sisco (1–3)	Mastny (2)	12,671	57–68
126	August 24	@ Royals	8–4	Sabathia (9–8)	Gobble (3–5)		13,098	58–68
127	August 25	Tigers	4–2	Sowers (6–3)	Bonderman (11–6)	Betancourt (1)	33,416	59–68
128	August 26	Tigers	8–5	Westbrook (11–8)	Verlander (15–7)	Mastny (3)	29,138	60–68
129	August 27	Tigers	7–1	Rogers (14–6)	Lee (10–110)		28,342	60–69
130	August 28	Blue Jays	6–4	Byrd (9–6)	Burnett (6–6)	Mastny (4)	19,623	61–69
131	August 29	Blue Jays	5–2	Sabathia (10–8)	League (0–2)		21,563	62–69
132	August 30	Blue Jays	3–2 (10)	Betancourt (3–4)	Ryan (1–2)		22,065	63–69

September/October: 15–15

#	Date	Opponent	Score	Win	Loss	Save	Attendance	Record
133	September 1	@ Rangers	7–2	Westbrook (12–8)	Padilla (13–9)		23,776	64–69
134	September 2	@ Rangers	6–5	Lee (11–10)	Vólquez (1–4)	Mastny (5)	40,222	65–69
135	September 3	@ Rangers	5–2	Millwood (14–9)	Byrd (9–7)	Otsuka (30)	19,667	65–70
136	September 4	@ Blue Jays	4–3	League (1–2)	Sabathia (10–9)	Ryan (30)	27,864	65–71
137	September 5	@ Blue Jays	7–2	Sowers (7–3)	Accardo (1–1)		18,517	66–71
138	September 6	@ Blue Jays	3–2	Lilly (12–12)	Westbrook (12–9)	Ryan (31)	20,406	66–72
139	September 7	@ White Sox	9–1	Lee (12–10)	Buehrle (12–12)		34,671	67–72
140	September 8	@ White Sox	7–6	Thornton (5–2)	Mastny (0–1)		37,188	67–73
141	September 9	@ White Sox	10–8	Garland (17–4)	Carmona (1–9)	Thornton (2)	38,422	67–74
142	September 10	@ White Sox	5–2	Sabathia (11–9)	McCarthy (3–7)		37,723	68–74
143	September 12	Royals	5–3	Hernández (6–9)	Sowers (7–4)	Nelson (7)	18,883	68–75
144	September 13	Royals	6–2	de la Rosa (3–2)	Westbrook (12–10)		20,089	68–76
145	September 14	Twins	9–4	Crain (4–5)	Davis (3–2)		21,424	68–77
146	September 15	Twins	5–4 (10)	Cabrera (3–2)	Neshek (4–2)		32,473	69–77
147	September 16	Twins	4–1	Silva (10–13)	Sabathia (11–10)	Nathan (33)	26,757	69–78
148	September 17	Twins	6–1	Baker (5–8)	Byrd (9–8)	Guerrier (1)	20,324	69–79
149	September 18	@ Athletics	7–2	Westbrook (13–10)	Haren (14–12)		17,352	70–79
150	September 19	@ Athletics	7–3	Gaudin (2–2)	Lee (12–11)		15,866	70–80
151	September 20	@ Athletics	4–3	Loaiza (11–8)	Cabrera (3–3)	Street (35)	25,131	70–81
152	September 21	@ Athletics	7–4	Gaudin (3–2)	Sabathia (11–11)	Street (36)	20,452	70–82
153	September 22	@ Rangers	12–4	Eaton (7–4)	Byrd (9–9)		26,284	70–83
154	September 23	@ Rangers	6–3	Miller (1–0)	Padilla (14–10)	Betancourt (2)	38,351	71–83
155	September 24	@ Rangers	11–6	Westbrook (14–10)	Millwood (16–11)		36,617	72–83
156	September 25	White Sox	14–1	Lee (13–11)	Garland (17–7)		15,913	73–83
157	September 26	White Sox	6–0	Sabathia (12–11)	Vázquez (11–11)		16,080	74–83
158	September 27	White Sox	2–1 (8)	McCarthy (4–7)	Carmona (1–10)	Haeger (1)	16,404	74–84
159	September 28	Devil Rays	5–4	Byrd (10–9)	Lugo (2–4)	Betancourt (3)	14,503	75–84
160	September 29	Devil Rays	2–1	Sikorski (2–1)	Miceli (1–2)		19,983	76–84
161	September 30	Devil Rays	6–1	Westbrook (15–10)	Seo (1–8)		17,562	77–84
162	October 1	Devil Rays	6–3	Lee (14–11)	Hammel (0–6)		22,079	78–84

== Player stats ==
=== Batting ===
Note: G = Games played; AB = At bats; R = Runs scored; H = Hits; 2B = Doubles; 3B = Triples; HR = Home runs; RBI = Runs batted in; AVG = Batting average; SB = Stolen bases

Player	G	AB	R	H	2B	3B	HR	RBI	AVG	SB
Ronnie Belliard	93	350	43	102	21	0	8	44	.291	2
Rafael Betancourt	3	0	0	0	0	0	0	0	—	0
Casey Blake	109	401	63	113	20	1	19	68	.282	6
Aaron Boone	104	354	50	89	19	1	7	46	.251	5
Ben Broussard	88	268	44	86	14	0	13	46	.321	0
Paul Byrd	2	4	0	1	0	0	0	0	.250	0
Fernando Cabrera	3	0	0	0	0	0	0	0	—	0
Fausto Carmona	5	0	0	0	0	0	0	0	—	0
Shin-Soo Choo	45	146	23	43	11	3	3	22	.295	5
Ryan Garko	50	185	28	54	12	0	7	45	.292	0
Franklin Gutierrez	43	136	21	37	9	0	1	8	.272	0
Travis Hafner	129	454	100	140	31	1	42	117	.308	0
Todd Hollandsworth	56	156	21	37	12	1	6	27	.237	0
Joe Inglett	64	201	26	57	8	3	2	21	.284	5
Kevin Kouzmanoff	16	56	4	12	2	0	3	11	.214	0
Tim Laker	4	13	1	4	1	0	0	2	.308	0
Cliff Lee	2	6	0	1	0	0	0	0	.167	0
Héctor Luna	37	127	14	35	7	1	2	17	.276	0
Andy Marte	50	164	20	37	15	1	5	23	.226	0
Victor Martinez	153	572	82	181	37	0	16	93	.316	0
Tom Mastny	1	0	0	0	0	0	0	0	—	0
Lou Merloni	9	19	1	4	1	0	0	1	.211	1
Jason Michaels	123	494	77	132	32	1	9	55	.267	9
Guillermo Mota	2	0	0	0	0	0	0	0	—	0
Jhonny Peralta	149	569	84	146	28	3	13	68	.257	0
Eduardo Pérez	37	99	16	30	9	0	8	22	.303	0
Rafael Perez	3	0	0	0	0	0	0	0	—	0
CC Sabathia	3	9	0	2	0	0	0	2	.222	0
Kelly Shoppach	41	110	7	27	6	0	3	16	.245	0
Grady Sizemore	162	655	134	190	53	11	28	76	.290	22
Ramón Vázquez	34	67	11	14	2	0	1	8	.209	0
Jake Westbrook	2	4	0	2	1	0	0	1	.500	0
Bob Wickman	5	0	0	0	0	0	0	0	—	0
Team totals	162	5619	870	1576	351	27	196	839	.280	55

=== Pitching ===
Note: W = Wins; L = Losses; ERA = Earned run average; G = Games pitched; GS = Games started; SV = Saves; IP = Innings pitched; H = Hits allowed; R = Runs allowed; ER = Earned runs allowed; BB = Walks allowed; K = Strikeouts

Player	W	L	ERA	G	GS	SV	IP	H	R	ER	BB	K
Rafael Betancourt	3	4	3.81	50	0	3	56.2	52	25	24	11	48
Andrew Brown	0	0	3.60	9	0	0	10.0	6	4	4	8	7
Paul Byrd	10	9	4.88	31	31	0	179.0	232	120	97	38	88
Fernando Cabrera	3	3	5.19	51	0	0	60.2	53	36	35	32	71
Fausto Carmona	1	10	5.42	38	7	0	74.2	88	46	45	31	58
Jason Davis	3	2	3.74	39	0	1	55.1	67	28	23	14	37
Danny Graves	2	1	5.79	13	0	0	14.0	18	12	9	5	3
Jeremy Guthrie	0	0	6.98	9	1	0	19.1	24	15	15	15	14
Jason Johnson	3	8	5.96	14	14	0	77.0	108	55	51	22	32
Juan Lara	0	0	1.80	9	0	0	5.0	4	2	1	1	2
Cliff Lee	14	11	4.40	33	33	0	200.2	224	114	98	58	129
Tom Mastny	0	1	5.51	15	0	5	16.1	17	10	10	8	14
Matt Miller	1	0	3.45	14	0	0	15.2	11	6	6	9	12
Guillermo Mota	1	3	6.21	34	0	0	37.2	45	27	26	19	27
Edward Mujica	0	1	2.95	10	0	0	18.1	25	6	6	0	12
Rafael Perez	0	0	4.38	18	0	0	12.1	10	6	6	6	15
CC Sabathia	12	11	3.22	28	28	0	192.2	182	83	69	44	172
Scott Sauerbeck	0	1	6.23	24	0	0	13.0	9	9	9	9	11
Brian Sikorski	2	1	4.58	17	0	0	19.2	20	10	10	4	24
Brian Slocum	0	0	5.60	8	2	0	17.2	27	11	11	9	11
Jeremy Sowers	7	4	3.57	14	14	0	88.1	85	36	35	20	35
Jake Westbrook	15	10	4.17	32	32	0	211.1	247	106	98	55	109
Bob Wickman	1	4	4.18	29	0	15	28.0	29	15	13	11	17
Team totals	78	84	4.41	162	162	24	1423.1	1583	782	698	429	948

== Minor league affiliates ==
Classification level	Team	League	Season article
AAA	Buffalo Bisons	International League	2006 Buffalo Bisons season
AA	Akron Aeros	Eastern League	2006 Akron Aeros season
Advanced A	Kinston Indians	Carolina League	
A	Lake County Captains	South Atlantic League	
Short Season A	Mahoning Valley Scrappers	New York–Penn League	
Rookie	Gulf Coast Indians	Gulf Coast League	
Rookie	Burlington Indians	Appalachian League	
