= Brian Slocum =

American baseball player (born 1981)

- Pitcher
- Born: March 27, 1981 (age 45); New Rochelle, New York, U.S.
- Batted: Right Threw: Right

MLB debut
- April 22, 2006, for the Cleveland Indians

Last MLB appearance
- July 8, 2008, for the Cleveland Indians

MLB statistics
- Win–loss record: 0–0
- Earned run average: 7.78
- Strikeouts: 12
- Stats at Baseball Reference

Teams
- Cleveland Indians (2006, 2008)

Brian John Slocum (born March 27, 1981) is an American former Major League Baseball right-handed pitcher who played for the Cleveland Indians in 2006 and 2008.

== Amateur career ==
A native of New Rochelle, New York, Slocum was named MVP by the Archdiocesan of New York and Westchester County Player of the Year as a senior at Iona Prep (New York) in 1999, and was named one of the top 12 high school pitchers in the United States. After high school, he was drafted by the Minnesota Twins in the 14th round (419th overall) of the 1999 Major League Baseball draft, but chose to attend Villanova University.

In 2000, Slocum was named third-team freshman All-American by Baseball America and Louisville Slugger freshman All-America honorable mention at Villanova. In 2001, he played collegiate summer baseball with the Cotuit Kettleers of the Cape Cod Baseball League. In 2002, he was rated the #1 prospect in Pennsylvania and 40th nationally entering the 2002 draft by Baseball America. He compiled a 10–7 record with a 3.31 ERA, 128 strikeouts, and 68 walks in 155 innings in three years at Villanova. The Cleveland Indians selected him in the second round (63rd overall) of the 2002 Major League Baseball draft and he was signed in June of that year.

== Professional career ==
=== Cleveland Indians ===
Slocum made his professional debut in 2002 with the Single-A Mahoning Valley Scrappers, going 5–2 with a 2.60 ERA in 11 starts. In 2003, he spent the season with the Single-A Kinston Indians. In 22 games (21 starts), Slocum was 6–7 with a 4.46 ERA, and he was named a Carolina League top prospect by Sportsticker. In 2004, he led the Carolina League in wins (15) with Kinston and tied for the league lead in complete games (2) and shutouts (2). In November 2005, Cleveland added him to their 40-man roster.

On April 21, 2006, Slocum was recalled from the Triple-A Buffalo Bisons. He made his major league debut against the Kansas City Royals on April 22, pitching two innings, giving up two runs, walking two, and striking out two. Slocum recorded a 7.71 ERA in four relief appearances before being sent back down to Buffalo on May 2. He was recalled again on September 7 when the active rosters expanded. In eight total appearances (two starts) with Cleveland, Slocum recorded an ERA of 5.60.

Slocum began the 2007 season with the Bisons, but was limited to five starts due to injury, going 2–2 with a 4.15 ERA. After recovering in the offseason, he was sent to Buffalo again to begin the 2008 season. Slocum was 3–4 with a 5.66 ERA in his first 11 starts before being recalled by Cleveland on June 4. However, he did not feature in a game before being sent back down on June 8. On July 4, Slocum was recalled again after transitioning into a relief role with Buffalo. He was sent to the Bisons again on July 12 after struggling in two relief appearances. On September 23, it was announced that Slocum would undergo season-ending elbow surgery. He became a free agent after the season on November 3.

=== Pittsburgh Pirates ===
On December 8, 2008, Slocum signed a minor league contract with the Pittsburgh Pirates organization. After going 1–3 with two saves and a 3.94 ERA in 19 relief appearances with the Triple-A Indianapolis Indians, Slocum was released on July 14, 2009.

=== Southern Maryland Blue Crabs ===
Slocum signed with the Southern Maryland Blue Crabs of the Atlantic League of Professional Baseball for the 2011 season. He pitched in 15 games for the club, notching a 4.08 ERA and 4–4 record with 51 strikeouts over 81 2/3 innings pitched.
