= Jake Robbins =

American baseball player (born 1976)

- Pitcher
- Born: May 23, 1976 (age 48); Charlotte, North Carolina, U.S.
- Batted: Right Threw: Right

MLB debut
- September 20, 2004, for the Cleveland Indians

Last MLB appearance
- September 24, 2004, for the Cleveland Indians

MLB statistics
- Win–loss record: 0–0
- Earned run average: 5.40
- Strikeouts: 0
- Stats at Baseball Reference

Teams
- Cleveland Indians (2004)

Phillip Jacob Robbins (born May 23, 1976) is a former Major League Baseball pitcher who ended his career in the Chicago White Sox organization.

He appeared in only two major league games in 2004 for the Cleveland Indians at the age of 28. The only run he gave up was a solo home run by Jacque Jones on September 24 of that year. His earned run average was 5.40. In 2007, he pitched for the White Sox Triple-A affiliate, the Charlotte Knights, in Fort Mill, South Carolina. Robbins was 0–0 in 20 games, with an ERA of 5.11 and 14 strikeouts in 24 2/3 innings.

He currently runs the Jake Robbins Pitching School at Showcase Baseball Academy.
