= Matt Miller (baseball, born 1971) =

American baseball player (born 1971)

- Relief pitcher
- Born: November 23, 1971 (age 54); Greenwood, Mississippi, U.S.
- Batted: Right Threw: Right

MLB debut
- June 27, 2003, for the Colorado Rockies

Last MLB appearance
- June 12, 2007, for the Cleveland Indians

MLB statistics
- Win–loss record: 6–1
- Earned run average: 2.72
- Strikeouts: 95
- Stats at Baseball Reference

Teams
- Colorado Rockies (2003); Cleveland Indians (2004–2007)

Jacob Matthew Miller (born November 23, 1971) is an American former right-handed Major League Baseball relief pitcher who played for the Colorado Rockies and Cleveland Indians. He was noted for his distinct sidearm delivery.

== Independent and Minor League career ==
Miller began his professional baseball career playing for the Greenville Bluesmen in the independent Big South League (1996–1997) and Texas–Louisiana League (1998). He signed with the Texas Rangers in December 1997, was released at the end of spring training in 1998 and then re-signed with the Rangers in June. He played in their minor league system for the Savannah Sand Gnats (1998), Charlotte Rangers (1999), Tulsa Drillers (1999–2000) and Oklahoma RedHawks (2000). In November 2000, he was signed as a minor league free agent by the San Diego Padres and played for their triple-A Pacific Coast League affiliate, Portland Beavers, in 2001. He was signed by the Oakland Athletics after the 2001 season and played for their triple-A affiliate, Sacramento River Cats, in 2002.

== Major League career ==
He signed with the Colorado Rockies during the off-season and spent most of 2003 at Triple-A with the Colorado Springs Sky Sox, but finally made his major league debut with the Rockies June 27 against the Pittsburgh Pirates. He appeared in only four games for Colorado that season and was again granted free agency in November.

The Cleveland Indians became Miller's fifth major league organization in five years when they signed him in February 2004. He became an integral part of the Indians' bullpen, appearing in 57 games and posting a 4–1 record, 3.09 ERA, 55 strikeouts, 23 walks and one save. He continued his success in 2005 before a strained elbow tendon in his throwing arm landed him on the disabled list in mid-July. He made two rehabilitation appearances in August, but was shut down for the season when the soreness in his elbow recurred. He appeared in 23 games for Cleveland in 2005 and was 1–0 with one save and a 1.82 ERA. He made the Indians opening day roster in 2006 and appeared in six games in April. But when his elbow symptoms returned during a game on April 19, he was again placed on the disabled list and the following week underwent surgery to repair the flexor tendon in the elbow. He returned in September and was effective in eight appearances. For the season, he was 1–0 with a 3.45 ERA in just 15 2/3 innings.

In 2007, Miller began the season on the disabled list with a right forearm strain. When he returned May 9, he was optioned to Buffalo and made 14 appearances for the Bisons before he was recalled to Cleveland June 10, when Jeremy Sowers was sent down to Buffalo. He made only two appearances for the Indians and was returned to Buffalo to make room on the roster for Jason Stanford who was inserted into the starting rotation in place of the ineffective Sowers.

After the 2007 season, Miller signed with the Boston Red Sox, but did not appear in a game for their organization before being traded to the Pittsburgh Pirates. On July 29, 2008, Miller announced his retirement, after posting a 4–7 record with a 5.82 ERA for Triple-A Indianapolis.
