= Kyle Denney =

American baseball player (born 1977)

- Pitcher
- Born: July 27, 1977 (age 49); Prague, Oklahoma, U.S.
- Batted: Right Threw: Right

MLB debut
- September 14, 2004, for the Cleveland Indians

Last MLB appearance
- September 29, 2004, for the Cleveland Indians

MLB statistics
- Win–loss record: 1–2
- Earned run average: 9.56
- Strikeouts: 13
- Stats at Baseball Reference

Teams
- Cleveland Indians (2004)

Kyle Dean Denney (born July 27, 1977) is an American former Major League Baseball pitcher. Denney made four starts for the Cleveland Indians in 2004.

== Career ==
Denney was born in Prague, Oklahoma and attended Prague High School, where he played baseball, football, and basketball. He received a scholarship from Seminole State College and played baseball there for two years before playing baseball for two more years at the University of Oklahoma. After graduating, the Cleveland Indians drafted him in the 26th round of the 1999 Major League Baseball draft. He played for the Burlington Indians and Mahoning Valley Scrappers in 1999 before being promoted to the Columbus RedStixx for 2000, finishing the year with an 8–6 record and a 3.05 earned run average (ERA) in 28 games. After spending the first half of 2001 with the Kinston Indians, Denney missed the rest of 2001 and part of the 2002 season due to Tommy John surgery.

In 2002, Denney primarily played for Kinston and spent some time with the Akron Aeros. In 2003, Denney was an Eastern League All-Star, playing for Akron and the Buffalo Bisons. He spent most of the 2004 season with Buffalo, going 10–5 with a 4.41 ERA in 24 starts. He made his major league debut on September 14, 2004 and played in four games in September for the Indians. On September 29, 2004, while riding the team bus after a game in Kansas City, Denney was struck in the calf by a stray bullet fired by an unknown assailant. He was saved from suffering a more serious injury thanks to the pair of USC cheerleader boots he was wearing as part of a hazing ritual.

Denney recovered and spent the 2005 season with Buffalo, playing in nine games for the Bisons. He became a free agent after the 2005 season and signed with the Washington Nationals on February 10, 2006, starting for six games for their Triple-A team, the New Orleans Zephyrs. In 2007, Denney played five games for the Single-A Lakeland Tigers of the Detroit Tigers organization, ending his professional career.
