= Cliff Bartosh =

American baseball player (born 1979)

- Relief pitcher
- Born: September 5, 1979 (age 46); West, Texas, U.S.
- Batted: Left Threw: Left

MLB debut
- May 15, 2004, for the Cleveland Indians

Last MLB appearance
- June 18, 2005, for the Chicago Cubs

MLB statistics
- Win–loss record: 1–2
- Earned run average: 5.08
- Strikeouts: 40
- Stats at Baseball Reference

Teams
- Cleveland Indians (2004); Chicago Cubs (2005)

Clifford Paul Bartosh (born September 5, 1979) is a former left-handed relief pitcher in Major League Baseball who played for the Cleveland Indians and Chicago Cubs.

He was selected in the 29th round of the 1998 Major League Baseball draft by the San Diego Padres. He made his MLB debut on May 15, 2004, and was with the Indians in four different stints over the year. He improved as the year went on, posting an ERA of 2.70 in his last 30 appearances. His role in the bullpen often was to come in against a lefty, sometimes for just one out. For the Indians in 2004, he went 1–0 in 34 appearances in relief, posting a 4.66 ERA. In 2005, he went 0–2 with an ERA of 5.49 in 19 relief appearances.

A 2005 single in his only at-bat left Bartosh with a rare MLB career batting average of 1.000.
