= Scott Elarton =

American baseball player (born 1976)

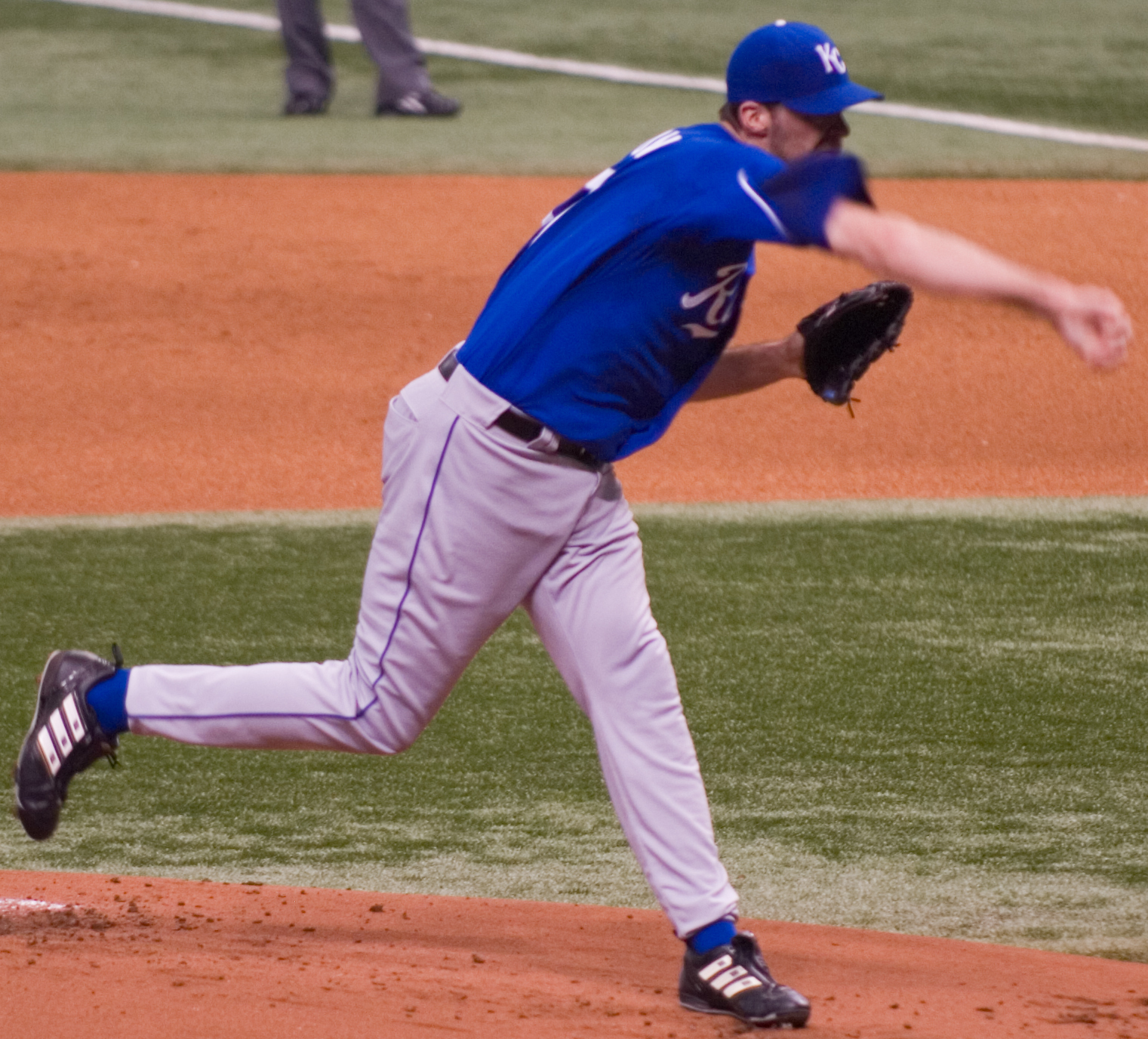
- Elarton with the Kansas City Royals in 2007
- Pitcher
- Born: February 23, 1976 (age 50); Lamar, Colorado, U.S.
- Batted: Right Threw: Right

MLB debut
- June 20, 1998, for the Houston Astros

Last MLB appearance
- June 28, 2008, for the Cleveland Indians

MLB statistics
- Win–loss record: 56–61
- Earned run average: 5.29
- Strikeouts: 698
- Stats at Baseball Reference

Teams
- Houston Astros (1998–2001); Colorado Rockies (2001, 2003–2004); Cleveland Indians (2004–2005); Kansas City Royals (2006–2007); Cleveland Indians (2008)

Vincent Scott Elarton (born February 23, 1976) is an American former right-handed pitcher. He played in Major League Baseball (MLB) for the Houston Astros (1998–2001), Colorado Rockies (2001–2004), Cleveland Indians (2004–2005, 2008) and the Kansas City Royals (2006–2007)

== Playing career ==
=== Minor leagues; Houston Astros (1994–2001) ===
Elarton was chosen by the Astros in the first round (25th overall) of the 1994 Major League Baseball draft when he was 18 years old. Foregoing college for the minor leagues, Elarton made his professional debut that year with the Gulf Coast League Astros, posting a 4–0 record in five starts while not allowing a single run and striking out 28 batters in 28 innings pitched. He was later promoted to the Single-A Quad Cities River Bandits, where he went 4–1 with a 3.79 earned run average (ERA) in nine starts. Elarton remained with Quad Cities in 1995, going 13–7 with a 4.45 ERA in 26 starts.

Prior to the 1996 season, Elarton was named Houston's fifth-best prospect by Baseball America. That year, he made the move to High-A with the Kissimmee Cobras, posting a 12–7 record with a 2.92 ERA in 27 starts. He also tossed three complete games (one shutout) and struck out 130 batters in 172 1/3 innings. Elarton split the 1997 season with the Double-A Jackson Generals and Triple-A New Orleans Zephyrs, where he had a combined 11–8 record and a 3.84 ERA in 29 starts.

On June 20, 1998, at 22 years of age, Elarton made his Major League debut against the Cincinnati Reds. He pitched 6 1/3 innings, allowing four earned runs on five hits while striking out nine batters to earn a no-decision. He spent most of 1998 as a relief pitcher, and finished the season 2–2 with two saves and a 3.32 ERA in 28 games (two starts). In the 1998 postseason, Elarton allowed the game-winning home run to Jim Leyritz in Game 3 of the National League Division Series against the San Diego Padres, giving him the loss in San Diego's 2–1 victory. The Astros went on to lose the series in four games.

Elarton started 1999 in the bullpen. He was moved to the starting rotation in early July and compiled a 9–5 record with one save and a 3.48 ERA in 42 games (15 starts) for the season. In the 1999 National League Division Series, Elarton posted a 3.86 in two relief appearances, recording four strikeouts in 2 1/3 innings. The Astros went on to lose the series to the Atlanta Braves in four games. After the season, Elarton underwent shoulder surgery to repair a partial tear in his rotator cuff.

Elarton started 2000 on the disabled list and in minor league rehabilitation. Despite the injury, he had the best season of his career in 2000, posting a 17–7 record and a 4.81 ERA in 30 starts for a poor Astros team that compiled only a 72–90 record. Winning twice as many games as any other pitcher on the team at the hitter-friendly Enron Field, he was named the team's Pitcher of the Year.

In 2001, Elarton got off to a bad start, going 4–8 with an ERA of 7.14 ERA in 20 starts with the Astros. On July 17, he was placed on the disabled list with right biceps tendinitis.

=== Colorado Rockies (2001–2004) ===
On July 31, 2001 Elarton was traded to the Colorado Rockies for Pedro Astacio and cash considerations. The move returned Elarton to his home state of Colorado. The Rockies' hitter-friendly Coors Field stadium did little to improve his season, as he finished with an 0–2 record and 6.65 ERA in four starts with Colorado, and a combined season ERA of 7.06. He also finished the season at fifth-worst in the National League in home runs allowed (34) and eighth-worst in earned runs allowed (104).

Elarton missed the entire 2002 season after undergoing arthroscopic surgery on his right shoulder. He then spent the majority of the 2003 season with the Triple-A Colorado Springs Sky Sox, going 6–8 with a 5.31 ERA in 20 starts. In 11 games (10 starts) with the Rockies, Elarton was 4–4 with 6.27 ERA.

Entering 2004, Elarton was competing for a starting spot in the Rockies rotation. After a good spring training, Elarton made the opening day roster as the fifth starter. Through eight starts, he posted an ERA of 9.80 without winning a decision and also set a Colorado record for most consecutive decision losses to open a season, as he opened the season 0–6. On May 21, the Rockies placed Elarton on release waivers.

=== Cleveland Indians (2004–2005) ===
After being released by the Rockies, Elarton signed with the Cleveland Indians on June 3, 2004. He earned his first victory with Cleveland on July 29 against the Detroit Tigers, pitching seven innings while allowing four runs on six hits while striking out five batters. On August 29, Elarton pitched the best game of his career against the Chicago White Sox, a two-hit complete game shutout, allowing only one walk and recording six strikeouts. He posted a win–loss record of 3–5 and a 4.53 ERA in 21 starts for the Indians. For the season, Elarton gave up 33 home runs, placing him in the top 10 in the major leagues among qualifying pitchers.

In 2005, Elarton spent his first season entirely in the Majors since 2001. He also recorded his first double-digit winning season since 2000. He finished with an 11–9 record and a 4.61 ERA in 31 starts for the second-place Indians. Elarton allowed 32 home runs, tying him for ninth in the majors along with Randy Johnson and placing him in the top 10 in that category for the second consecutive season.

=== Kansas City Royals (2006–2007) ===
On December 16, 2005, Elarton was signed as a free agent to a two-year, $8 million contract with the Kansas City Royals. He was the Royals' Opening Day starter, allowing two earned runs in 5 2/3 innings while walking three and striking out three. However, he was tagged with the loss in Kansas City's 3–1 defeat to the Detroit Tigers. On May 26, 2006, Elarton gave up Derek Jeter's 2,000th career hit. He also earned his first victory of the season in the game. Elarton was shut down after 20 starts, finishing with a 4–9 record, a 5.34 ERA and a strikeout/walk ratio of 3.8 (49 strikeouts, 52 walks) in 114 2/3 innings. He underwent season-ending shoulder surgery on August 1.

The Royals released Elarton on July 25, 2007. He had started the season 2–4 with a 10.46 ERA in nine starts, allowing 43 earned runs in 37 innings.

=== Return to the Cleveland Indians (2008) ===
Elarton signed a minor league contract with the Indians on August 3, 2007. He spent the remainder of the season with the Triple-A Buffalo Bisons, posting a 1–0 record and a 2.50 ERA in nine relief appearances. Elarton re-signed with the Indians on February 8, 2008, to a minor league contract with an invitation to spring training. He was called up to the majors on May 24. On July 8, Elarton was put on the disabled list with a non-baseball condition. He had been on the restricted list prior to that with what Indians manager Eric Wedge described as "personal issues." At the time, he was 0–1 with a 3.52 ERA in eight relief appearances.

=== Chicago White Sox (2010) ===
After taking a year off from baseball, Elarton signed a minor league deal with the White Sox. He appeared in just 16 games for their Triple-A affiliate, the Charlotte Knights, after being hampered by a toe injury the whole season. In those games, he finished with a 1–2 record and an 8.64 ERA.

=== Philadelphia Phillies (2012) ===
Elarton spent the following years battling numerous injuries and remaining outside of professional baseball. He was at 299 pounds between 2009 and 2011. In 2011, a chance encounter with Philadelphia Phillies general manager Rubén Amaro, Jr. led to Elarton receiving a minor league contract with Phillies and an invitation the team's 2012 spring training.

Elarton spent the 2012 season with the Triple-A Lehigh Valley IronPigs. He made 26 starts, going 6–11 with an ERA of 5.41. At one point, Elarton had a 22 inning scoreless streak. For Elarton, it was just a matter of having love for the game again after appearing in just 16 games from 2009 to 2012.

=== Minnesota Twins (2013) ===
On December 11, 2012, the Minnesota Twins signed Elarton to a minor-league contract. He was released on March 26, 2013.

=== Sugar Land Skeeters ===
Soon after being released by Minnesota, Elarton signed a contract to pitch for the Sugar Land Skeeters. At the end of the 2013 season, he announced his retirement, where the crowd gave him a standing ovation.

== Coaching career ==
=== Pittsburgh Pirates farm system ===
On January 14, 2014, it was announced that Elarton would serve as the pitching coach for the Gulf Coast League Pirates, the Gulf Coast League affiliate of the Pittsburgh Pirates. The following season, Elarton was named as the pitching coach for the Pirates' High-A affiliate, the Bradenton Marauders.

The next season, he was named a special assistant to the general manager in the Pirates' front office.

== Scouting report ==
At 6 feet, 7 inches, Elarton would hide the ball well due to his tall frame, relying on a sinking two-seam fastball. At the time of his callup with the Astros, his fastball clocked at 93–95 MPH, but due to multiple shoulder injuries, it lost two to three miles per hour, reaching between 90 and 92 MPH. Elarton also threw a curveball, a changeup and a cutter. His propensity for being a flyball pitcher was the reason he gave up a lot of home runs.

== Personal life ==
Elarton has two children, Kenan and Chloe. Kenan is a pitcher for the Houston Christian Huskies baseball team, while Chloe plays as a setter for the Georgia Bulldogs volleyball team.
