= Juan Lara =

Dominican baseball player (born 1981)

- Relief pitcher
- Born: January 26, 1981 (age 45); Azua, Dominican Republic
- Batted: Right Threw: Left

MLB debut
- September 8, 2006, for the Cleveland Indians

Last MLB appearance
- September 6, 2007, for the Cleveland Indians

MLB statistics
- Win–loss record: 0-0
- Earned run average: 4.26
- Strikeouts: 4
- Stats at Baseball Reference

Teams
- Cleveland Indians (2006–2007)

Juan Manuel Lara (born January 26, 1981) is a Dominican former professional baseball relief pitcher. He was signed by the Cleveland Indians as an amateur free agent in May 1999 and was called up to the major league club on September 5, 2006.

== Career ==
Lara played for the Dominican Summer League Indians (1999–2001), Burlington Indians (2002), Mahoning Valley Scrappers (2003), Lake County Captains (2003), Kinston Indians (2004–2005), Akron Aeros (2005–2007), and Buffalo Bisons (2006-2007). He worked as a starting pitcher from 2000 through the first half of 2003 and has worked primarily out of the bullpen since then compiling a minor league record of 24–28, 16 saves, a 3.96 ERA and 443 strike outs in 509 2/3 innings. Lara became a free agent at the end of the 2008 season.

=== Accident ===
Lara was involved in a serious automobile accident on the night of November 24, 2007, in his homeland of the Dominican Republic. His car was struck at an intersection by a motorcycle. Both occupants of the motorcycle were killed instantly, while Lara was taken to a Dominican Republic hospital with life-threatening injuries, including broken ribs, a broken D2 vertebra and possible brain damage. His injuries were considered to be possibly career-ending.

On March 12, 2008, Lara was released from the Indians' 40-man roster; he was subsequently re-signed to a minor league contract despite the fact that he was to miss the entire 2008 season. The Indians organization will handle all of Lara's medical expenses.

After wearing a halo vest to support his neck and surgeries on his spine and arms, Lara reported to the Indians' training camp on March 31, 2009. He made 15 appearances for the rookie-level AZL Indians, posting an 0–1 record and 4.24 ERA with 19 strikeouts across 17 innings pitched. Lara elected free agency following the season on November 9.
