= Jake Westbrook =

American baseball player (born 1977)

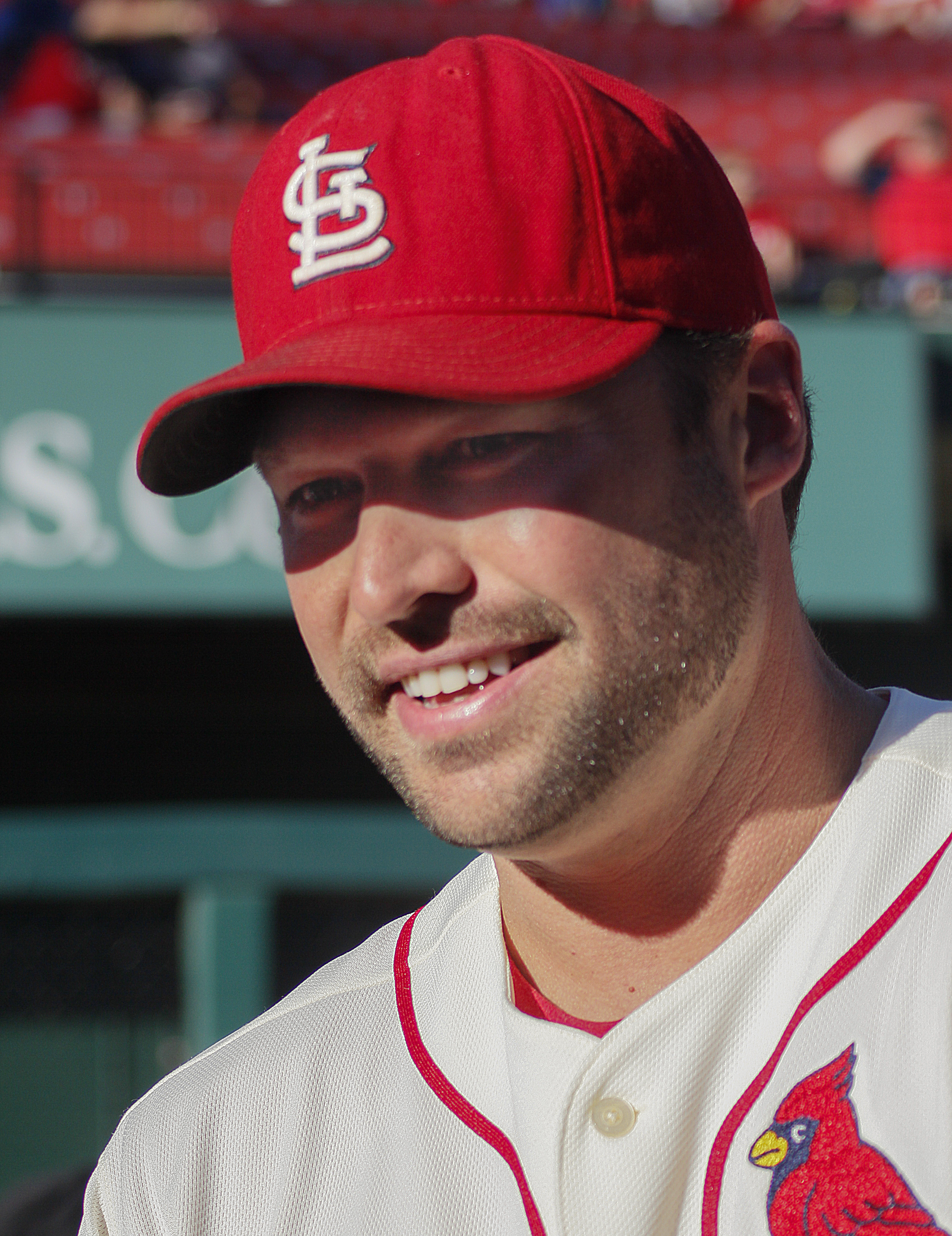
- Westbrook with the St. Louis Cardinals
- Pitcher
- Born: September 29, 1977 (age 48); Athens, Georgia, U.S.
- Batted: Right Threw: Right

MLB debut
- June 17, 2000, for the New York Yankees

Last MLB appearance
- September 29, 2013, for the St. Louis Cardinals

MLB statistics
- Win–loss record: 105–103
- Earned run average: 4.32
- Strikeouts: 965
- Stats at Baseball Reference

Teams
- New York Yankees (2000); Cleveland Indians (2001–2008, 2010); St. Louis Cardinals (2010–2013)

Career highlights and awards
- All-Star (2004); World Series champion (2011)

Jacob Cauthen Westbrook (born September 29, 1977) is an American former professional baseball pitcher in Major League Baseball. He was known as a sinker ball pitcher. Westbrook made his major league debut with the New York Yankees, but was soon traded to the Cleveland Indians, where he spent ten years. Cleveland eventually dealt him to the St. Louis Cardinals, where he won a World Series in 2011.

== Early and personal life ==
Westbrook was born on September 29, 1977, in Athens, Georgia. He attended Madison County High School. His father, Cauthen, played baseball and basketball at the University of Georgia. His grandfather and great-grandfather were also athletes at UGA. He signed a letter of intent with Georgia but never attended because he signed with the Colorado Rockies. He has an older sister, Jill.

Westbrook attended Madison County High School. He tossed five no-hitters and one perfect game in his high school career. During his senior season, Westbrook was 9–1 with a 1.11 ERA and 110 strikeouts in 63 innings. On March 28, 2008, Westbrook appeared at his high school alma mater to speak and give thanks as they retired his high school #12 jersey during a home baseball game.

Westbrook married his high school sweetheart, Heather Daniels, on December 12, 1998. The couple has four children. They reside in Danielsville, Georgia, and also have a home in Germantown, Tennessee.

== Professional career ==
=== Draft and minor leagues ===
Westbrook was a first-round draft pick (21st overall) in the 1996 Major League Baseball draft by the Colorado Rockies. He had previously committed to play college baseball for the Georgia Bulldogs. Following the draft, 18-year-old Westbrook began his pro career with the Arizona Rockies, the Rookie league affiliate of the Rockies in the Arizona League. He made 11 starts in Mesa, going 4–2 with a 2.87 ERA. He was later promoted to the short-season Single-A Portland Rockies in the Northwest League, and went 1–1 with a 2.55 ERA in four starts.

For the 1997 season, Westbrook was promoted to the Single-A Asheville Tourists in the South Atlantic League. He went 14–11 with a 4.29 ERA in 28 games (27 starts).

On November 18, 1997, the Rockies traded Westbrook along with fellow minor leaguers John Nicholson and Mark Hamlin to the Montreal Expos for infielder Mike Lansing. The Expos assigned Westbrook to the Jupiter Hammerheads, their Class A-Advanced affiliate in the Florida State League. In 1998, he went 11–6 for the Hammerheads with a 3.26 ERA in 27 starts. In 1999, he went 11–5 with a 3.92 ERA in 27 starts for the Harrisburg Senators, the Double-A club in the Eastern League.

On December 22, 1999, the Expos traded Westbrook along with two players to be named later to the New York Yankees for Hideki Irabu. The Yankees assigned Westbrook to the Triple-A Columbus Clippers in the International League. He went 5–7 with a 4.65 ERA in 15 starts.

=== New York Yankees (2000) ===
Westbrook made his major league debut on June 17, 2000. In his first start at Yankee Stadium for the Yankees against the Chicago White Sox, he did not make it past the second inning. He appeared in three games (two starts) for the Yankees as a rookie, going 0–2 with a 13.50 ERA.

=== Cleveland Indians (2000–2010) ===
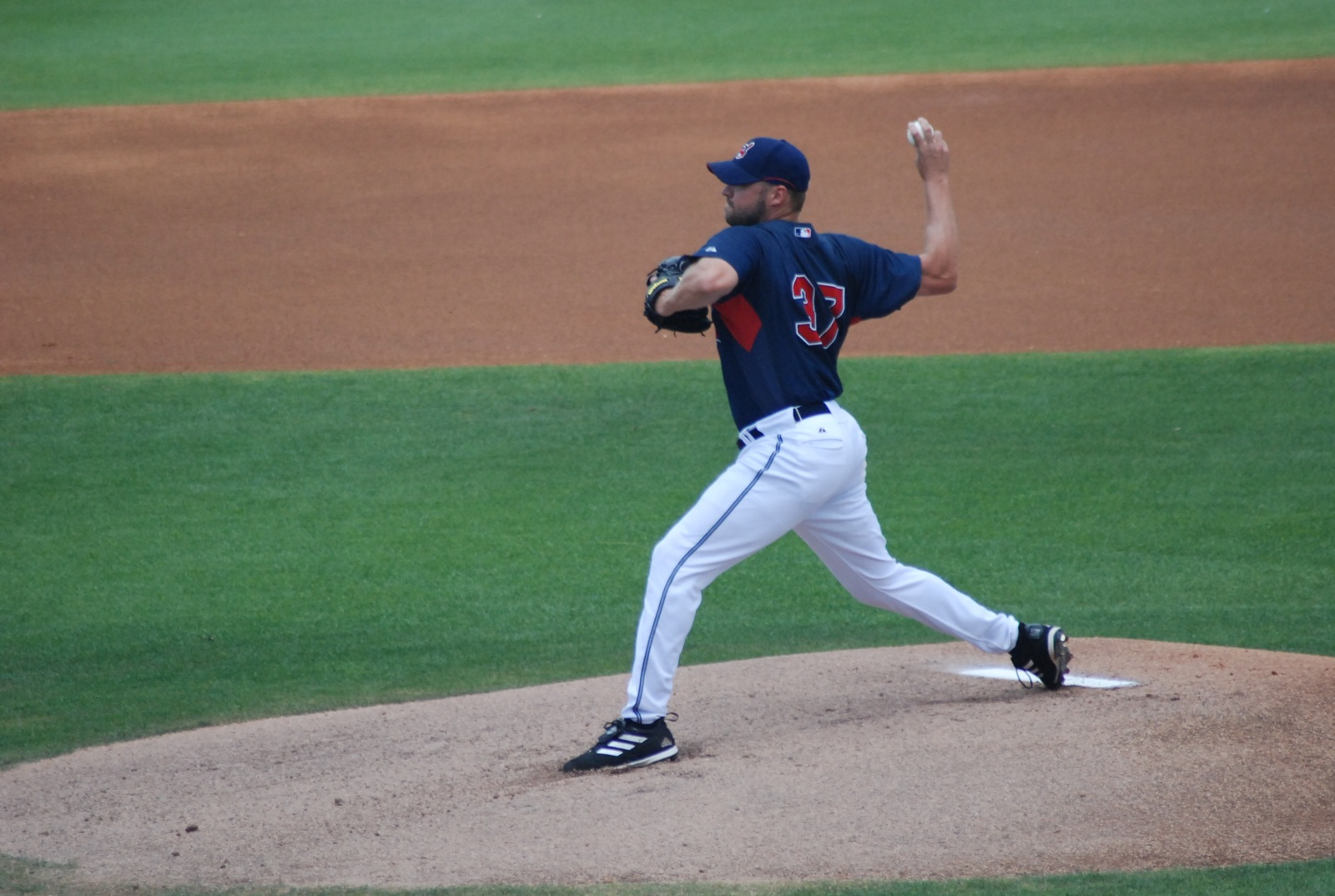
Westbrook pitching for the Cleveland Indians

On July 24, 2000, the Yankees sent Westbrook and Zach Day to the Cleveland Indians to complete the June 29 trade for outfielder/designated hitter David Justice. However, Westbrook cracked a rib at some point while he was pitching, so his 2000 season was cut short.

In 2001, Westbrook shuttled back and forth between Cleveland and its then Triple-A affiliate Buffalo Bisons in the International League. He did well in Buffalo, amassing an 8–1 record and a 3.20 ERA in 12 starts. For Cleveland, Westbrook appeared in 23 games (six starts), going 4–4 with a 5.85 ERA. He missed most of the 2002 season, appearing only 11 times for Cleveland, once for Triple-A Buffalo, and three times for Double-A Akron.

Westbrook began the 2003 season in the bullpen, but converted back to starter, going 7–10 with a 4.33 ERA in 34 games (22 starts).

Westbrook was named to the All-Star team in 2004, and finished that season 14–9 with a 3.38 ERA in 33 games (30 starts). He ranked among the American League leaders in complete games (5, tied for first), ERA (third), WHIP (1.247, seventh), wins (tied for eighth) and innings pitched (215 2/3, tied for ninth).

Westbrook finished the 2005 season with a 15–15 record and a 4.49 ERA in 34 starts.

In 2006, Westbrook went 15–10 with a 4.17 ERA in 32 starts. He pitched two complete game shutouts, and induced 35 double plays, the most in the major leagues. The 2006 season also marked the third consecutive season in which he won at least 14 games.

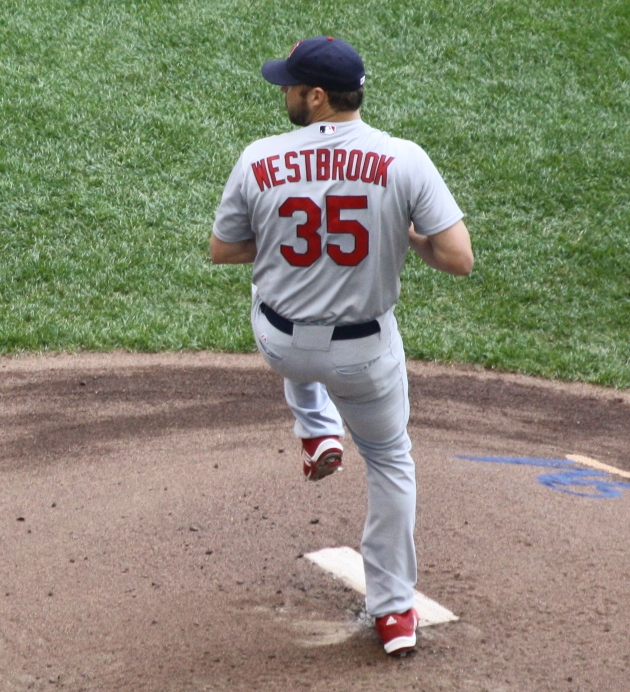
Pitching for the Cardinals in 2011

On April 13, 2007, Westbrook signed a three-year, $33 million contract extension with the Indians, which was intended to keep him in Cleveland through the 2010 season. He struggled in the first half of the season, going 1–4 with a 6.27 ERA in nine starts. His stats greatly improved in the second half, and he finished 5–5 with a 3.44 ERA in 16 starts after the All-Star break. Overall, Westbrook finished the season 6–9 with a 4.32 ERA in 25 starts. He also saw his first career postseason action when he started Game 3 of the 2007 American League Division Series against the Yankees, his former team. In five innings, Westbrook allowed six earned runs on nine hits while striking out one in a loss. The Indians went on to win the series in four games, advancing to the ALCS to face the Boston Red Sox. In Game 3 of the series, Westbrook earned his first postseason win, allowing just two earned runs in 6 2/3 innings, helping Cleveland to a 4–2 win and 2–1 series lead. Westbrook then started the decisive Game 7, but suffered the loss after allowing three earned runs on nine hits in six innings. In three postseason starts, he was 1–2 with a 5.60 ERA.

Westbrook started the 2008 season strong, going 1–2 with a 2.73 ERA in his first four starts. On April 23, he was placed on the 15-day disabled list with a strained left intercostal muscle. On May 28, he was activated to start against the Chicago White Sox. After the start, Westbrook began to feel soreness in his elbow, but was optimistic that he would be able to make his next start. On June 7, 2008, the Tribe announced that he would be undergoing Tommy John surgery and be out of action for 10–14 months, ending his 2008 season. Westbrook also spent the entire 2009 season on the 60-day DL, still recovering from the surgery.

Westbrook tested his surgically repaired elbow in the offseason, playing winter ball in Puerto Rico. He made four starts, recording a 3.65 ERA. Westbrook returned to action as the Indians' 2010 Opening Day starter. Through 21 starts, he was 6–7 with one complete game and a 4.65 ERA.

=== St. Louis Cardinals (2010–2013) ===
On July 31, 2010, the Indians traded Westbrook to the St. Louis Cardinals in a three-team deal which also involved the San Diego Padres. Westbrook, who had nearly $4 million remaining in his 2010 salary and another $2 million bonus because of the trade, agreed to forgo part of the bonus to make the deal happen.

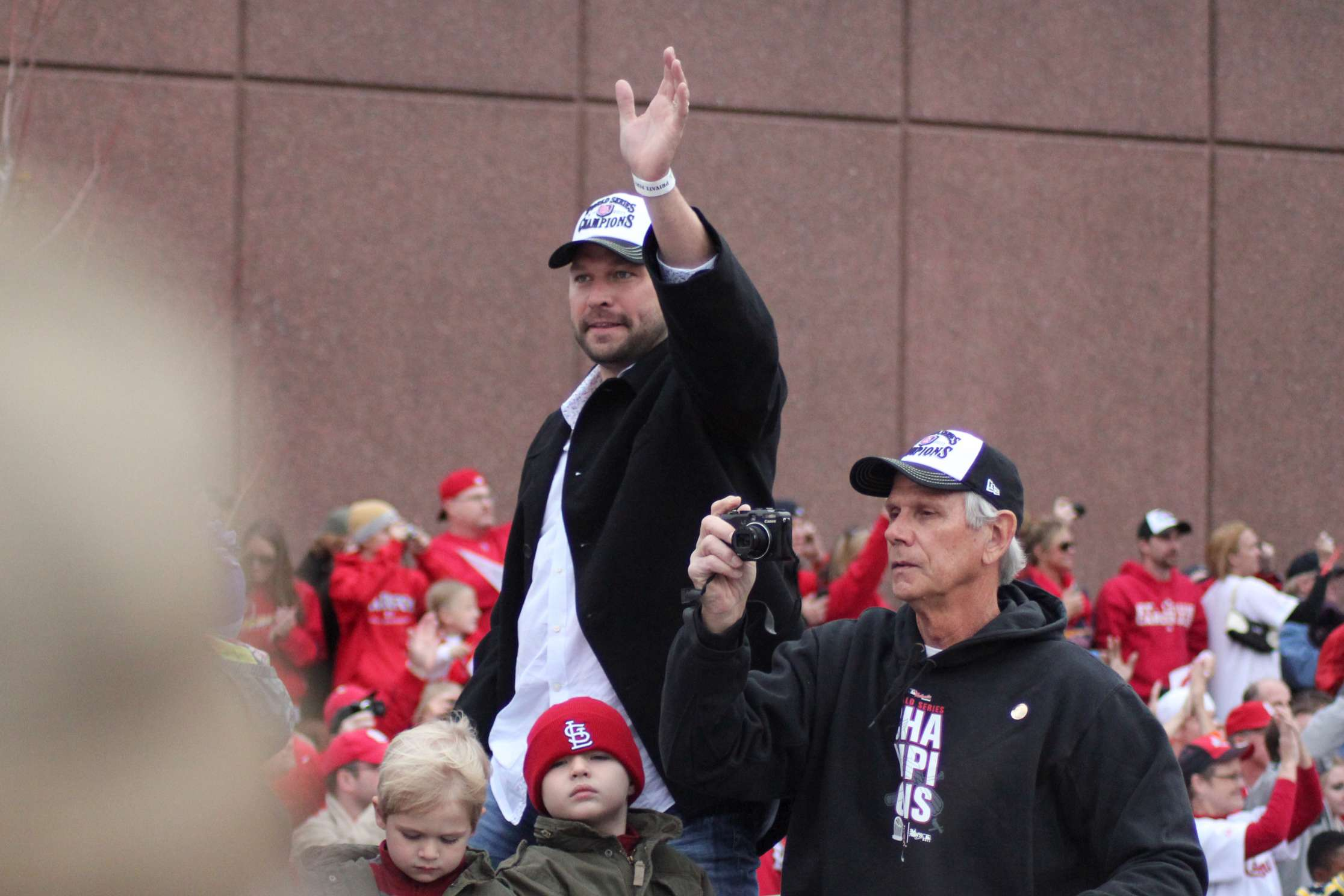
Westbrook during the 2011 World Series parade

Between Cleveland and St. Louis, Westbrook finished 10–11 with a 4.22 ERA in 33 starts. He went 4–4 with a 3.48 ERA in 12 starts for St. Louis following the trade.

On November 16, 2010, Westbrook and the Cardinals agreed to a two-year, $16.5 million deal with a mutual 2013 option and a blanket no-trade clause. On August 31, 2011, Westbrook hit his first career home run, a grand slam against the Milwaukee Brewers.

In 2011, Westbrook issued a career high 73 walks in 183 1/3 innings pitched, going 12–9 with a 4.66 ERA in 33 starts. He was initially left off the Cardinals' 2011 playoff roster. However, after the Cardinals' bullpen faced a heavy load in the National League Division Series and the National League Championship Series, Westbrook was added to the World Series roster. Westbrook pitched in two games and recorded a win in the pivotal Game 6 against the Texas Rangers, when the Cardinals came from behind to win in extra innings while facing elimination. The Cardinals went on to win Game 7, giving Westbrook his first World Series ring.

In 2012, Westbrook finished 13–11 and had a 3.97 ERA in 28 starts. On August 21, he signed a contract extension with the Cardinals through the 2013 season. The deal included a mutual option for 2014. On September 9, Westbrook was sidelined with a strained right oblique. After suffering a setback, he missed the remainder of the season and playoffs.

On July 19, 2013, Westbrook went 3–for–3 as a batter, scoring two runs and driving in one, while also pitching 6 1/3 innings. This was Westbrook's first multi-hit game.

On October 31, 2013, the Cardinals declined their $9.5 million option on Westbrook for the 2014 season, making him a free agent. Hampered by injuries after the All-Star break, Westbrook saw little action in the last months of the season and was left off the Cardinals post-season roster. He finished his Cardinal career with a 36–32 record and a 4.27 ERA over three seasons.

On February 14, 2014, Westbrook announced his retirement from baseball.

=== Pitching style ===
Westbrook was a sinkerballer, the pitch accounting for more than 60% of his total pitches. It sat in the low 90s, averaging about 91 mph. He also threw a slider/cutter in the mid-high 80s, as well as a changeup and curveball around 80 mph. Westbrook used his slider on both left- and right-handed hitters, but threw the curveball only to righties and the changeup only to lefties.

In 2013, Westbrook added a split-finger fastball to his arsenal.
