= Jason Stanford (baseball) =

American baseball player (born 1977)

- Pitcher
- Born: January 23, 1977 (age 49); Tucson, Arizona, U.S.
- Batted: Left Threw: Left

MLB debut
- July 6, 2003, for the Cleveland Indians

Last MLB appearance
- July 26, 2007, for the Cleveland Indians

MLB statistics
- Win–loss record: 2-5
- Earned run average: 3.61
- Strikeouts: 51
- Stats at Baseball Reference

Teams
- Cleveland Indians (2003–2005, 2007)
Medals
Men's baseball
Representing United States
Baseball World Cup
Silver medal – second place	2001 Taipei	National team

Jason John Stanford (born January 23, 1977) is a former left-handed Major League Baseball starting pitcher who played parts of three seasons for the Cleveland Indians. He is a 1995 graduate of Canyon del Oro High School in Oro Valley, Arizona. Stanford attended Barton County Community College in Great Bend, Kansas in 1996 and 1997, where he was an Academic All-American. In 1998 and 1999, he attended the University of North Carolina at Charlotte and was an All-Conference USA selection both years. The Cleveland Indians signed Stanford as an amateur free agent in November 1999.

He made his major league debut with the Indians in 2003 against the Minnesota Twins. In June 2007, Stanford was promoted to the Indians from Buffalo after the team optioned struggling starter Jeremy Sowers to the Triple-A club. He made his season debut against the Florida Marlins on June 14 during interleague play, but soon found himself moved to the bullpen, and then demoted to Triple-A Buffalo, where he finished the season. After signing a minor league contract with the Washington Nationals, Stanford was released on April 21, 2008. On April 25, 2008, Stanford signed a minor league contract with the Cleveland Indians, but was released on May 21. He signed with Los Potros de Tijuana in June. Once the season ended, he signed with the Chicago Cubs and was assigned to Triple-A Iowa in July. He became a free agent at the end of the season. During his baseball career in the Indians organization, he won the Bob Feller Award.

In 2009, Stanford became a baseball analyst for SportsTime Ohio and WKYC Channel 3 (NBC) in Cleveland. Beginning in the 2011 season, Stanford's role increased as he became the full-time pregame show analyst.

Stanford became head coach for the Howland Tigers baseball team in Warren, Ohio, for the 2010–2011 and 2011–2012 seasons.

In August 2012, Stanford became the pitching coach for the Youngstown State University baseball team.

In March 2015, Stanford's contract was not renewed by Fox Sports for Indians Live or Tribe Report. He currently is co-host for ESPN Radio 1540 KNR2 Alicia Scicolone Show.

Stanford started a college prep baseball organization in Niles, Ohio to help high school student athletes develop the skills to play college baseball.

Stanford was named as the pitching coach for the Rookie advanced level Danville Braves in the Atlanta Braves organization for the 2019 season.
