= Fernando Cabrera (baseball) =

Puerto Rican baseball player (born 1981)

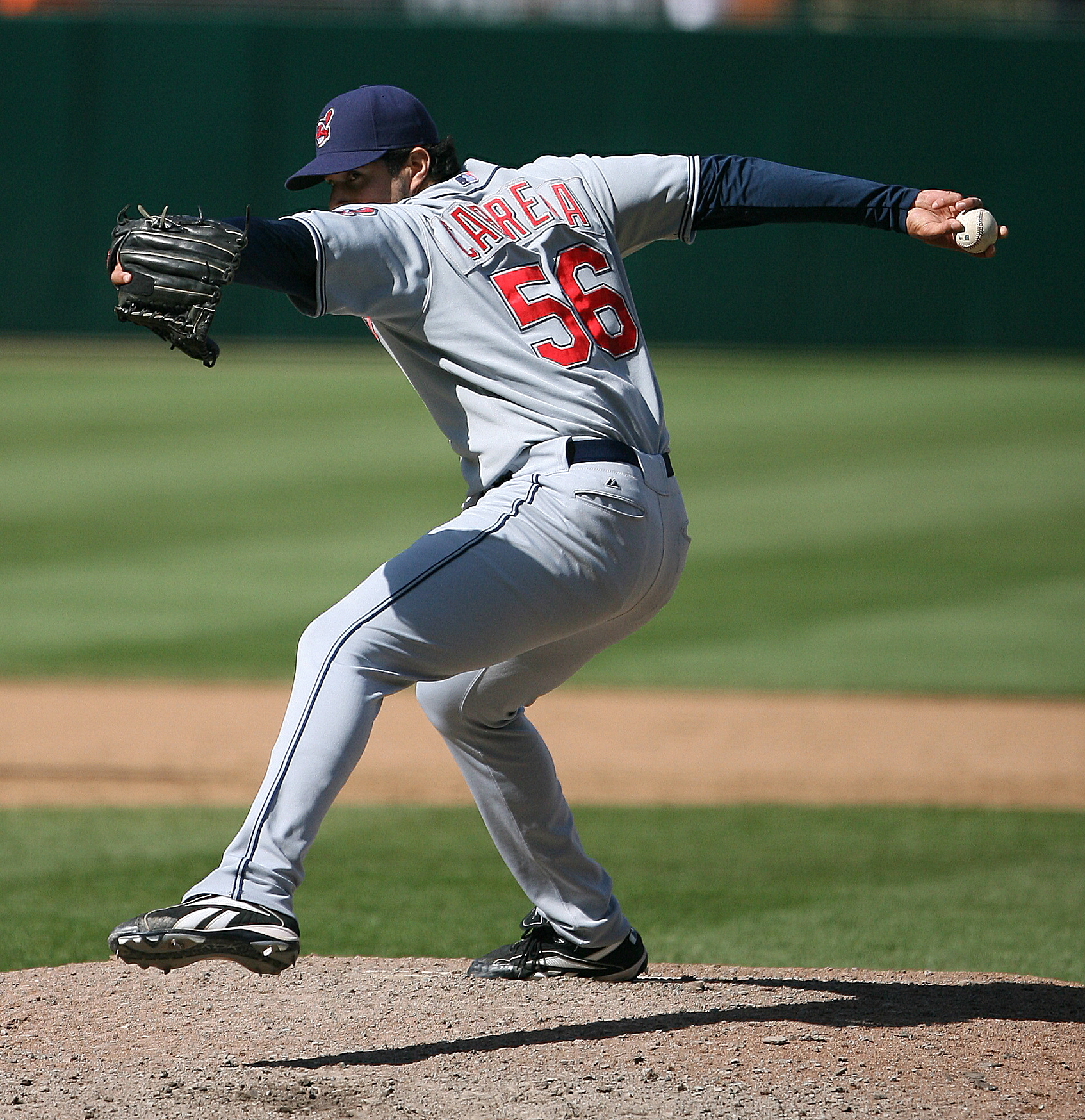
- Cabrera with the Cleveland Indians in 2007
- Relief pitcher
- Born: November 16, 1981 (age 43); Toa Baja, Puerto Rico
- Batted: Right Threw: Right

MLB debut
- August 20, 2004, for the Cleveland Indians

Last MLB appearance
- July 16, 2010, for the Boston Red Sox

MLB statistics
- Win–loss record: 8–7
- Earned run average: 5.24
- Strikeouts: 193
- Stats at Baseball Reference

Teams
- Cleveland Indians (2004–2007); Baltimore Orioles (2007–2008); Boston Red Sox (2009–2010)
Medals
Men's baseball
Representing Puerto Rico
World Baseball Classic
Silver medal – second place	2013 San Francisco	Team
Pan American Games
Gold medal – first place	2019 Lima	Team
Central American and Caribbean Games
Gold medal – first place	2018 Barranquilla	Team

Fernando José Cabrera (born November 16, 1981) is a Puerto Rican former professional baseball relief pitcher. He played in Major League Baseball (MLB) for the Cleveland Indians, Baltimore Orioles, and Boston Red Sox.

== Career ==
=== Cleveland Indians ===
Cabrera was drafted by the Cleveland Indians in the 10th round of the 1999 Major League Baseball draft and signed in August 1999. He was selected to participate in the 2005 All-Star Futures Game. He was designated for assignment by Cleveland on August 1, 2007, and was subsequently released on August 9.

=== Baltimore Orioles ===
The Tampa Bay Devil Rays claimed him off release waivers on August 13, and had five days to sign him or let Cabrera become a free agent. Cabrera decided to become a free agent and signed a minor league contract with the Baltimore Orioles on August 21, 2007. The Orioles recalled Cabrera in September 2007. He was placed on the 15-day disabled list by the Orioles at the beginning of the 2008 season. On September 5, 2008, Cabrera was released by the Orioles.

=== Boston Red Sox ===
On January 27, 2009, he signed a minor league contract with the Boston Red Sox. He was called up to the Red Sox on August 9, 2009.

=== Oakland Athletics ===
He played with the Sacramento River Cats in the Oakland Athletics system in 2011.

=== New York Mets ===
On January 10, 2012, Cabrera signed with the New York Mets to a minor league deal.

=== Los Angeles Angels ===
On January 11, 2013, Cabrera signed a minor league deal with the Los Angeles Angels of Anaheim. He was assigned to the Salt Lake Bees, and he played a season for them before retiring.

=== International play ===
Cabrera played for Puerto Rico in the 2006, 2009 and 2013 World Baseball Classic. In 2009, he gave up the ninth-inning single to David Wright to allow Team USA to come back from a 5–4 deficit to win the game, eliminating Puerto Rico from the competition.

== See also ==
- List of Major League Baseball players from Puerto Rico
