= 2007 Toronto Blue Jays season =

2007 Toronto Blue Jays
- League: American League
- Division: East
- Ballpark: Rogers Centre
- City: Toronto
- Record: 83–79 (.512)
- Divisional place: 3rd
- Owners: Rogers; Paul Godfrey (CEO)
- General managers: J. P. Ricciardi
- Managers: John Gibbons
- Television: Rogers Sportsnet (Jamie Campbell, Pat Tabler, Rance Mulliniks, Darrin Fletcher, Sam Cosentino (field reporter)) (116 games) TSN (Rod Black, Pat Tabler) (20 games); CBC (Jim Hughson, Rance Mulliniks, Jesse Barfield) (8 games)
- Radio: 590 AM

The 2007 Toronto Blue Jays season was the franchise's 31st season of Major League Baseball. The Blue Jays tried to improve on their 87-win 2006 season, hoping to make the playoffs for the first time since 1993.

In the offseason, the Jays signed All Star outfielder Vernon Wells to one of the richest contracts in MLB history, giving him a seven-year contract worth $126 million. Toronto also extended the contract of first baseman Lyle Overbay, and signed veteran designated hitter Frank Thomas. To offset the loss of starter Ted Lilly to the Chicago Cubs, Toronto signed Japanese pitcher Tomo Ohka and former Atlanta starter John Thomson to one-year contracts and inked former New York Mets hurler Víctor Zambrano to a minor-league deal. All three men, however, were eventually designated for assignment and released. The Jays also picked up infielder Jason Smith from the Rule 5 draft, but he too was released from his contract.

== Regular season ==
=== Summary ===
During the month of January, Toronto signed starting pitchers John Thomson and then Tomo Ohka to incentive-based one-year contracts in an effort to strengthen their 4th and 5th rotational slots. On January 30 Toronto also signed starting pitcher Víctor Zambrano to a minor league contract, and invited him to spring training. All three were eventually released. When Brandon League, who was being considered for the main setup role, arrived to Spring training with a strained lat muscle, Zambrano took the empty spot in the bullpen. Thomson injured himself in spring training, so the Blue Jays named Ohka and Towers as their fourth and fifth starters. After four mediocre starts, Josh Towers was sent to the bullpen and replaced by Dustin McGowan. Towers returned to the rotation later in the year replacing released pitcher Tomo Ohka. When Gustavo Chacín was injured, he was replaced in the rotation by Shaun Marcum, who had a breakout year.

The season was blighted by persistent injuries, with 12 Blue Jays landing on the DL. The most serious injury was that of B. J. Ryan, who was out for the entire season having had Tommy John Surgery. However, due to the emergence of young pitchers like Dustin McGowan, Casey Janssen and Jeremy Accardo, the Jays finished 4 games above .500.

One of the most memorable games this season for the Jays was on Tuesday, June 5, 2007, when they rallied from being down 11–6 in the bottom of the ninth inning against the Tampa Bay Devil Rays to win 12–11 on an RBI walk-off base on balls by Aaron Hill, a victory that moved them to within 1 game under .500

Another memorable moment of this season was Dustin McGowan's complete game one-hitter on Sunday, June 24 against the Colorado Rockies at the Rogers Centre. McGowan carried a no-hitter into the ninth inning when outfielder Jeff Baker hit a single with no out to break it up. This was the first Jays' one-hitter since September 27, 1998, in which Roy Halladay threw against the Detroit Tigers. The Jays won 5–0 and moved themselves up to .500 for the first time since May 1 of the season. The game was also notable for Frank Thomas hitting the 499th home run of his career. The day after McGowan's gem, the Jays defeated the Minnesota Twins 8–5 to climb over the .500 mark for the first time since April and get their first four-game winning streak of the season.

On June 28, Frank Thomas became the 21st Major Leaguer to hit 500 career home runs. The pitcher who surrendered the homer was Minnesota Twins' starter Carlos Silva. Despite jumping out to an early lead the Jays couldn't hold on and ended up losing 8–5. In addition, Thomas was ejected from the game in the ninth inning by home plate umpire Mark Wegner for arguing balls and strikes.

On July 6, Reed Johnson returned to the lineup after spending three months on the DL. Johnson had been suffering back problems early in the season and received surgery, which forced him onto the 60-Day DL. This situation left Adam Lind the odd-man out in the lineup and he was optioned down to Triple-A. In his first game back Johnson went 1–3 at the plate, and made a game-saving catch in the ninth which prevented two runs (only one run scored on a sac-fly) from scoring and a runner on second (possibly third) and a one-run lead with only one out. The Jays won the game 8–6 against the Cleveland Indians.

On September 16, Aaron Hill broke the Blue Jays club record for most doubles by a second baseman in one season, set by Roberto Alomar in 1991 with 41 doubles that season. Hill recorded his 42nd double of the season against the Baltimore Orioles.

On September 17, Frank Thomas hit three home runs in a game for only the second time in his career, both times against the Boston Red Sox.

=== Season standings ===
AL East
Team	W	L	Pct.	GB	Home	Road
Boston Red Sox	96	66	.593	—	51‍–‍30	45‍–‍36
New York Yankees	94	68	.580	2	52‍–‍29	42‍–‍39
Toronto Blue Jays	83	79	.512	13	49‍–‍32	34‍–‍47
Baltimore Orioles	69	93	.426	27	35‍–‍46	34‍–‍47
Tampa Bay Devil Rays	66	96	.407	30	37‍–‍44	29‍–‍52

=== Detailed record ===
Team	Home	Away	Total	Gms Left
AL East
Baltimore Orioles	6-3	4-5	10-8	-
Boston Red Sox	4-5	5-4	9-9	-
New York Yankees	4-5	4-5	8-10	-
Tampa Bay Rays	5-4	4-5	9-9	-
	19-17	17-19	36-36	-
AL Central
Chicago White Sox	3-1	1-2	4-3	-
Cleveland Indians	2-1	0-3	2-4	-
Detroit Tigers	2-2	1-2	3-4	-
Kansas City Royals	2-1	2-2	4-3	-
Minnesota Twins	3-0	3-4	6-4	-
	12-5	7-13	19-18	-
AL West
Los Angeles Angels	2-1	2-2	4-3	-
Oakland Athletics	0-3	4-2	4-5	-
Seattle Mariners	5-1	0-3	5-4	-
Texas Rangers	5-2	0-3	5-5	-
	12-7	6-10	18-17	-
National League
Colorado Rockies	3-0	N/A	3-0	-
Los Angeles Dodgers	1-2	2-1	3-3	-
Philadelphia Phillies	N/A	1-2	1-2	-
San Francisco Giants	N/A	1-2	1-2	-
Washington Nationals	2-1	N/A	2-1	-
	6-3	4-5	10-8	-

Month	Games	Won	Lost
April	25	13	12
May	28	12	16
June	27	14	13
July	26	14	12
August	28	15	13
September	28	15	13
	162	83	79

=== Record vs. opponents ===
2007 American League record Source: MLB Standings Grid – 2007
Team	BAL	BOS	CWS	CLE	DET	KC	LAA	MIN	NYY	OAK	SEA	TB	TEX	TOR	NL
Baltimore	—	6–12	5–3	3–4	1–5	7–0	3–7	0–7	9–9	4–4	2–7	11–7	4–6	8–10	6–12
Boston	12–6	—	7–1	5–2	3–4	3–3	6–4	4–3	8–10	4–4	4–5	13–5	6–4	9–9	12–6
Chicago	3–5	1–7	—	7–11	11–7	12–6	5–4	9–9	4–6	4–5	1–7	6–1	2–4	3–4	4–14
Cleveland	4–3	2–5	11–7	—	12–6	11–7	5–5	14–4	0–6	6–4	4–3	8–2	6–3	4–2	9–9
Detroit	5–1	4–3	7–11	6–12	—	11–7	3–5	12–6	4–4	4–6	6–4	3–4	5–4	4–3	14–4
Kansas City	0–7	3–3	6–12	7–11	7–11	—	5–2	9–9	1–9	6–4	3–6	4–3	5–4	3–4	10–8
Los Angeles	7–3	4–6	4–5	5–5	5–3	2–5	—	6–3	6–3	9–10	13–6	6–2	10–9	3–4	14–4
Minnesota	7–0	3–4	9–9	4–14	6–12	9–9	3–6	—	2–5	5–2	6–3	3–4	7–2	4–6	11–7
New York	9–9	10–8	6–4	6–0	4–4	9–1	3–6	5–2	—	2–4	5–5	10–8	5–1	10–8	10–8
Oakland	4–4	4–4	5–4	4–6	6–4	4–6	10–9	2–5	4–2	—	5–14	4–6	9–10	5–4	10–8
Seattle	7–2	5–4	7–1	3–4	4–6	6–3	6–13	3–6	5–5	14–5	—	4–3	11–8	4–5	9–9
Tampa Bay	7–11	5–13	1–6	2–8	4–3	3–4	2–6	4–3	8–10	6–4	3–4	—	5–4	9–9	7–11
Texas	6–4	4–6	4–2	3–6	4–5	4–5	9–10	2–7	1–5	10–9	8–11	4–5	—	5–5	11–7
Toronto	10–8	9–9	4–3	2–4	3–4	4–3	4–3	6–4	8–10	4–5	5–4	9–9	5–5	—	10–8

=== 2007 draft picks ===
The 2007 MLB draft was held on June 7–8. The Blue Jays had two first round picks, along with five compensation picks.

Round	Pick	Player	Position	College/School	Nationality	Signed
1	16*	Kevin Ahrens	3B	Memorial High School (TX)	(United States)	2007–06–15
1	21	J. P. Arencibia	C	Tennessee	(United States)	2007–06–15
C-A	38*	Brett Cecil	LHP	Maryland	(United States)	2007–06–15
C-A	45*	Justin Jackson	SS	Roberson High School (NC)	(United States)	2007–07–07
C-A	56*	Trystan Magnuson	RHP	Louisville	(Canada)	2007–07–07
2	85	John Tolisano	2B	Estero High School (FL)	(United States)	2007–06–15
2	88*	Eric Eiland	OF	Lamar High School (TX)	(United States)	2007–06–15
3	115	Alan Farina	RHP	Clemson	(United States)	2007–07–07
4	145	Brad Mills	LHP	Arizona	(United States)	2007–06–15
5	175	Marc Rzepczynski	LHP	Cal-Riverside	(United States)	2007–06–15
6	205	Mike McDade	1B	Silverado High School (NV)	(United States)	2007–06–12
7	235	Randy Boone	RHP	Texas	(United States)	–
8	265	Scott Leffler	RHP	Tampa	(United States)	2007–07–07
9	295	Marcus Walden	RHP	Fresno City College	(United States)	2007–06–12
10	325	Joel Collins	C	South Alabama	(Canada)	2007–06–15

- * The Blue Jays received the 16th pick from the Texas Rangers as compensation for signing of free agent Frank Catalanotto
- * The Blue Jays received the 38th pick as compensation for loss of free agent Justin Speier
- * The Blue Jays received the 45th pick as compensation for loss of free agent Frank Catalanotto
- * The Blue Jays received the 56th pick as compensation for loss of free agent Ted Lilly
- * The Blue Jays received the 88th pick from the Los Angeles Angels of Anaheim as compensation for signing of free agent Justin Speier

=== Roster ===
2007 Toronto Blue Jays
Roster
Pitchers: 49 Jeremy Accardo; 58 Josh Banks; 34 A. J. Burnett; 39 Gustavo Chacín; 57 Jordan De Jong; 37 Scott Downs; 54 Jason Frasor; 62 Lee Gronkiewicz; 32 Roy Halladay; 44 Casey Janssen; 46 Joe Kennedy; 22 Brandon League; 51 Jesse Litsch; 28 Shaun Marcum; 40,29 Dustin McGowan; 18 Tomo Ohka; 52 B. J. Ryan; 56 Brian Tallet; 48 Ty Taubenheim; 7 Josh Towers; 36 Jamie Vermilyea; 40 Brian Wolfe; 31 Víctor Zambrano	Catchers: 13 Sal Fasano; 47 Jason Phillips; 59 Curtis Thigpen; 9 Gregg Zaun; Infielders: 8 Russ Adams; 4 Howie Clark; 11,42 Royce Clayton; 25 Troy Glaus; 2 Aaron Hill; 4 Joe Inglett; 18 Héctor Luna; 6 John McDonald; 1 Ray Olmedo; 17 Lyle Overbay; 20 Ryan Roberts; 4 Jason Smith	Outfielders: 11 John-Ford Griffin; 3 Reed Johnson; 26 Adam Lind; 15 Alex Ríos; 24 Matt Stairs; 10 Vernon Wells; Other batters: 35 Frank Thomas	Manager: 5 John Gibbons; Coaches: 38 Brad Arnsberg (pitching); 14 Mickey Brantley (hitting); 55 Brian Butterfield (third base); 45 Marty Pevey (first base); 53 Bruce Walton (bullpen); 12 Ernie Whitt (bench)

=== Game log ===
2007 game log
April: 13–12 (Home: 7–6; Away: 6–5)

#	Date	Opponent	Score	Win	Loss	Save	Attendance	Record
1	April 2	@ Tigers	5–3 (10)	Frasor (1–0)	Rodney (0–1)	Ryan (1)	44,297	1–0
2	April 4	@ Tigers	10–9	Robertson (1–0)	Burnett (0–1)	Jones (1)	24,881	1–1
--	April 5	@ Tigers	Postponed (cold weather) Rescheduled for September 10					
3	April 6	@ Devil Rays	6–5	Ryu (1–0)	Ryan (0–1)		38,437	1–2
4	April 7	@ Devil Rays	8–5	Marcum (1–0)	Fossum (0–1)	Ryan (2)	18,495	2–2
5	April 8	@ Devil Rays	6–3	Halladay (1–0)	Kazmir (0–1)	Janssen (1)	12,436	3–2
6	April 9	Royals	9–1	Burnett (1–1)	Pérez (0–2)		50,125	4–2
7	April 10	Royals	6–3	Greinke (1–1)	Towers (0–1)	Soria (1)	22,106	4–3
8	April 11	Royals	7–4	Chacín (1–0)	de la Rosa (1–1)	Ryan (3)	15,218	5–3
9	April 12	Tigers	5–4	Maroth (2–0)	Ohka (0–1)	Zumaya (1)	20,416	5–4
10	April 13	Tigers	2–1 (10)	Halladay (2–0)	Rodney (1–2)		26,268	6–4
11	April 14	Tigers	10–7	Ledezma (2–0)	Ryan (0–2)	Jones (6)	28,203	6–5
12	April 15	Tigers	2–1	Towers (1–1)	Robertson (2–1)	Marcum (1)	25,983	7–5
13	April 17	Red Sox	2–1	Chacín (2–0)	Matsuzaka (1–2)	Frasor (1)	42,162	8–5
14	April 18	Red Sox	4–1	Wakefield (2–1)	Ohka (0–2)	Papelbon (3)	20,188	8–6
15	April 19	Red Sox	5–3	Timlin (1–0)	Marcum (1–1)	Papelbon (4)	33,297	8–7
16	April 20	@ Orioles	5–4	Ray (2–1)	Zambrano (0–1)		25,025	8–8
17	April 21	@ Orioles	5–2	Loewen (2–0)	Towers (1–2)	Ray (6)	25,898	8–9
18	April 22	@ Orioles	7–3	Trachsel (1–1)	Chacín (2–1)		27,285	8–10
19	April 23	@ Red Sox	7–3	Ohka (1–2)	Wakefield (2–2)	Frasor (2)	36,669	9–10
20	April 24	@ Red Sox	10–3	Halladay (3–0)	Tavárez (0–2)		37,161	10–10
--	April 25	@ Yankees	Postponed (rain) Rescheduled for September 24					
21	April 26	@ Yankees	6–0	Burnett (2–0)	Hughes (0–1)		45,118	11–10
22	April 27	Rangers	5–3	Tejeda (3–1)	Towers (1–3)	Otsuka (3)	24,795	11–11
23	April 28	Rangers	9–8 (10)	Otsuka (1–0)	Tallet (0–1)	Benoit (1)	24,119	11–12
24	April 29	Rangers	7–3	Ohka (2–2)	McCarthy (1–4)		27,516	12–12
25	April 30	Rangers	6–1	Halladay (4–0)	Padilla (0–4)		19,041	13–12

May: 12–16 (Home: 8–5; Away: 4–11)

#	Date	Opponent	Score	Win	Loss	Save	Attendance	Record
26	May 1	@ Indians	12–4	Sabathia (4–0)	Burnett (2–2)		13,389	13–13
27	May 2	@ Indians	7–6 (11)	Mastny (2–0)	Marcum (1–2)		14,163	13–14
28	May 3	@ Indians	6–5	Fultz (3–0)	Frasor (1–1)	Borowski (10)	16,284	13–15
29	May 4	@ Rangers	7–1	McCarthy (2–4)	Ohka (2–3)	Eyre (1)	24,342	13–16
30	May 5	@ Rangers	11–4	Padilla (1–4)	Halladay (4–1)		27,421	13–17
31	May 6	@ Rangers	3–2	Benoit (1–1)	Burnett (2–3)	Otsuka (4)	19,103	13–18
32	May 8	Red Sox	9–2	Beckett (7–0)	Zambrano (0–2)		41,203	13–19
33	May 9	Red Sox	9–3	Matsuzaka (4–2)	Ohka (2–4)		21,784	13–20
34	May 10	Red Sox	8–0	Wakefield (4–3)	Halladay (4–2)		22,290	13–21
35	May 11	Devil Rays	5–1	Burnett (3–3)	Kazmir (2–2)		20,542	14–21
36	May 12	Devil Rays	5–4	Downs (1–0)	Stokes (1–5)	Accardo (1)	23,208	15–21
37	May 13	Devil Rays	2–1	Seo (2–3)	Frasor (1–2)	Reyes (11)	25,453	15–22
38	May 14	Orioles	5–3	Janssen (1–0)	Báez (0–2)	Accardo (2)	19,819	16–22
39	May 15	Orioles	2–1	Litsch (1–0)	Cabrera (3–4)	Accardo (3)	30,958	17–22
40	May 16	Orioles	2–1	Burnett (4–3)	Burres (1–2)		24,339	18–22
41	May 18	@ Phillies	5–3	Lieber (2–2)	McGowan (0–1)	Myers (5)	34,723	18–23
42	May 19	@ Phillies	13–2	Marcum (2–2)	Moyer (4–3)		32,004	19–23
43	May 20	@ Phillies	5–3	Eaton (4–3)	Litsch (1–1)	Myers (6)	39,030	19–24
44	May 22	@ Orioles	6–4	Burnett (5–3)	Cabrera (3–5)	Accardo (4)	17,852	20–24
45	May 23	@ Orioles	5–2	Trachsel (3–3)	McGowan (0–2)	Ray (11)	16,938	20–25
46	May 24	@ Orioles	5–4 (10)	Janssen (2–0)	Báez (0–4)	Accardo (5)	15,182	21–25
47	May 25	@ Twins	4–3	Guerrier (1–1)	Downs (1–1)	Nathan (10)	26,781	21–26
48	May 26	@ Twins	9–8 (13)	Tallet (1–1)	Guerrier (1–2)		31,434	22–26
49	May 27	@ Twins	4–2	Silva (3–5)	Burnett (5–4)	Nathan (11)	25,781	22–27
50	May 28	Yankees	7–2	McGowan (1–2)	DeSalvo (1–2)		28,791	23–27
51	May 29	Yankees	3–2	Accardo (1–0)	Pettitte (3–4)		30,116	24–27
52	May 30	Yankees	10–5	Clippard (2–1)	Litsch (1–2)	Rivera (4)	29,187	24–28
53	May 31	White Sox	2–0	Halladay (5–2)	Buehrle (2–2)	Accardo (6)	22,436	25–28

June: 14–13 (Home: 9–6; Away: 5–7)

#	Date	Opponent	Score	Win	Loss	Save	Attendance	Record
54	June 1	White Sox	3–0	Vázquez (3–3)	Burnett (5–5)	Jenks (15)	20,051	25–29
55	June 2	White Sox	9–3	McGowan (2–2)	MacDougal (1–3)	Janssen (2)	25,691	26–29
56	June 3	White Sox	4–3	Tallet (2–1)	Masset (1–2)	Accardo (7)	30,886	27–29
57	June 5	Devil Rays	12–11	Towers (2–3)	Fossum (3–6)		19,063	28–29
58	June 6	Devil Rays	6–2	Kazmir (4–3)	Ohka (2–5)		16,663	28–30
59	June 7	Devil Rays	5–3	Glover (3–2)	Accardo (1–1)	Reyes (15)	37,105	28–31
60	June 8	@ Dodgers	4–3 (10)	Seánez (3–1)	Accardo (1–2)		52,173	28–32
61	June 9	@ Dodgers	1–0	Marcum (3–2)	Lowe (6–6)	Janssen (3)	51,057	29–32
62	June 10	@ Dodgers	11–5	Halladay (6–2)	Schmidt (1–3)		50,183	30–32
63	June 11	@ Giants	4–3	Morris (7–3)	Towers (2–4)		38,030	30–33
64	June 12	@ Giants	3–2	Lowry (6–5)	Burnett (5–6)	Hennessey (3)	37,574	30–34
65	June 13	@ Giants	7–4	McGowan (3–2)	Lincecum (2–1)	Accardo (7)	40,086	31–34
66	June 15	Nationals	7–2	Halladay (7–2)	Bacsik (1–4)		22,042	32–34
67	June 16	Nationals	7–3	Marcum (4–2)	Speigner (2–3)		26,342	33–34
68	June 17	Nationals	4–2	Bowie (4–2)	Towers (2–5)	Cordero (11)	28,867	33–35
69	June 19	Dodgers	10–1	Penny (9–1)	McGowan (3–3)		22,763	33–36
70	June 20	Dodgers	12–1	Halladay (8–2)	Kuo (1–2)		24,413	34–36
71	June 21	Dodgers	8–4	Seánez (4–1)	Janssen (2–1)		25,265	34–37
72	June 22	Rockies	9–8 (10)	Wolfe (1–0)	Fuentes (0–1)		27,369	35–37
73	June 23	Rockies	11–6	Wolfe (2–0)	Cook (4–5)		32,482	36–37
74	June 24	Rockies	5–0	McGowan (4–3)	Fogg (3–6)		33,910	37–37
75	June 25	@ Twins	8–5	Halladay (9–2)	Guerrier (1–3)	Accardo (9)	24,240	38–37
76	June 26	@ Twins	2–1 (12)	Rincón (3–1)	Tallet (2–2)		27,000	38–38
77	June 27	@ Twins	5–4	Towers (3–5)	Bonser (5–4)	Accardo (10)	30,959	39–38
78	June 28	@ Twins	8–5	Silva (6–8)	Frasor (1–3)	Nathan (15)	31,038	39–39
79	June 29	@ Mariners	5–3	Washburn (7–6)	McGowan (4–4)	Putz (23)	41,862	39–40
80	June 30	@ Mariners	8–3	Batista (8–6)	Halladay (9–3)		36,102	39–41

July: 14–12 (Home: 7–2; Away: 7–10)

#	Date	Opponent	Score	Win	Loss	Save	Attendance	Record
81	July 1	@ Mariners	2–1	Putz (1–0)	Accardo (1–3)		38,778	39–42
82	July 2	@ Athletics	11–7	Towers (4–5)	DiNardo (3–5)		13,281	40–42
83	July 3	@ Athletics	3–1	Blanton (8–4)	Litsch (1–3)		35,077	40–43
84	July 4	@ Athletics	10–3	McGowan (5–4)	Kennedy (2–7)		26,566	41–43
85	July 6	Indians	8–6	Halladay (10–3)	Lee (5–5)	Accardo (11)	28,526	42–43
86	July 7	Indians	9–4	Carmona (10–4)	Marcum (4–3)		25,744	42–44
87	July 8	Indians	1–0	Accardo (2–3)	Byrd (7–4)		28,239	43–44
88	July 12	@ Red Sox	7–4	Wakefield (10–8)	Halladay (10–4)	Papelbon (21)	36,887	43–45
89	July 13	@ Red Sox	6–5	Marcum (5–3)	Snyder (1–2)	Accardo (12)	36,908	44–45
90	July 14	@ Red Sox	9–4	Matsuzaka (11–6)	McGowan (5–5)		36,830	44–46
91	July 15	@ Red Sox	2–1	Litsch (2–3)	Beckett (12–3)	Accardo (13)	36,301	45–46
92	July 16	@ Yankees	6–4	Proctor (2–5)	Towers (4–6)	Rivera (14)	52,993	45–47
93	July 17	@ Yankees	3–2 (10)	Vizcaíno (6–2)	Janssen (2–2)		51,961	45–48
94	July 18	@ Yankees	6–2	Myers (1–0)	Marcum (5–4)	Rivera (15)	52,147	45–49
95	July 19	@ Yankees	3–2	McGowan (6–5)	Wang (10–5)	Accardo (14)	53,857	46–49
96	July 20	Mariners	4–2	Batista (10–7)	Litsch (2–4)	Putz (29)	27,079	46–50
97	July 21	Mariners	1–0	Towers (5–6)	Weaver (2–8)	Accardo (15)	28,921	47–50
98	July 22	Mariners	8–0	Halladay (11–4)	Hernández (6–6)		29,083	48–50
99	July 23	Twins	6–4	Marcum (6–4)	Santana (11–8)	Accardo (16)	26,091	49–50
100	July 24	Twins	7–0	McGowan (7–5)	Baker (4–4)		30,669	50–50
101	July 25	Twins	13–1	Litsch (3–4)	Silva (8–11)		37,342	51–50
102	July 27	@ White Sox	4–3	Garland (8–7)	Towers (5–7)	Jenks (29)	34,590	51–51
103	July 28	@ White Sox	2–0	Buehrle (8–6)	Halladay (11–5)	Jenks (30)	37,744	51–52
104	July 29	@ White Sox	4–1	Marcum (7–4)	Vázquez (8–6)	Accardo (17)	36,571	52–52
105	July 30	@ Devil Rays	5–4 (11)	Dohmann (1–0)	Wolfe (2–1)		8,807	52–53
106	July 31	@ Devil Rays	2–0	Litsch (4–4)	Jackson (2–11)	Accardo (18)	10,569	53–53

August: 15–13 (Home: 9–7; Away: 6–6)

#	Date	Opponent	Score	Win	Loss	Save	Attendance	Record
107	August 1	@ Devil Rays	6–2	Glover (5–3)	Towers (5–8)		10,109	53–54
108	August 3	Rangers	6–4	Halladay (12–5)	Wright (3–4)	Accardo (19)	23,777	54–54
109	August 4	Rangers	9–5	Marcum (8–4)	Eyre (3–4)		25,231	55–54
110	August 5	Rangers	4–1	McGowan (8–5)	McCarthy (5–8)	Accardo (20)	29,593	56–54
111	August 6	Yankees	5–4	Pettitte (8–7)	Downs (1–2)	Rivera (18)	42,714	56–55
112	August 7	Yankees	9–2	Clemens (4–5)	Towers (5–9)		38,078	56–56
113	August 8	Yankees	15–4	Halladay (13–5)	Wang (13–6)		40,811	57–56
114	August 10	@ Royals	2–1	Marcum (9–4)	Meche (7–10)	Accardo (21)	21,276	58–56
115	August 11	@ Royals	4–1	Núñez (2–0)	McGowan (8–6)	Soria (13)	25,934	58–57
116	August 12	@ Royals	4–1	Burnett (6–6)	Bannister (8–7)	Accardo (22)	18,381	59–57
117	August 13	@ Royals	6–2	Pérez (7–11)	Litsch (4–5)		14,845	59–58
118	August 14	Angels	4–1	Halladay (14–5)	Saunders (6–1)		31,978	60–58
119	August 15	Angels	2–1	Marcum (10–4)	Moseley (4–2)	Accardo (23)	30,353	61–58
120	August 16	Angels	4–3	Escobar (13–6)	McGowan (8–7)	Rodríguez (30)	27,861	61–59
121	August 17	Orioles	5–2	Burnett (7–6)	Olson (1–2)	Accardo (24)	25,524	62–59
122	August 18	Orioles	5–3	Trachsel (6–7)	Litsch (4–6)	Báez (2)	33,387	62–60
123	August 19	Orioles	3–2 (10)	Downs (2–2)	Bradford (2–6)		38,132	63–60
124	August 20	Athletics	6–4	Blanton (11–8)	Marcum (10–5)	Street (11)	27,193	63–61
125	August 21	Athletics	6–4	Haren (14–4)	Tallet (2–3)	Street (12)	32,639	63–62
126	August 22	Athletics	4–1	Loaiza (1–0)	Burnett (7–7)	Embree (16)	31,145	63–63
127	August 23	@ Angels	5–4	Litsch (5–6)	Santana (5–12)	Accardo (25)	41,009	64–63
128	August 24	@ Angels	3–0	Weaver (9–6)	Halladay (14–6)	Rodríguez (32)	41,131	64–64
129	August 25	@ Angels	9–2	Marcum (11–5)	Saunders (7–2)		41,631	65–64
130	August 26	@ Angels	3–1	Escobar (15–6)	McGowan (8–8)	Rodríguez (33)	40,565	65–65
131	August 27	@ Athletics	6–2 (12)	Accardo (3–3)	Embree (1–2)		18,092	66–65
132	August 28	@ Athletics	5–4	Wolfe (3–1)	Brown (2–1)	Janssen (4)	20,542	67–65
133	August 29	@ Athletics	5–4 (11)	Lugo (5–0)	Frasor (1–4)		16,015	67–66
134	August 31	Mariners	7–5	Marcum (12–5)	Washburn (9–12)	Accardo (26)	34,518	68–66

September: 17–13 (Home: 9–5; Away: 8–8)

#	Date	Opponent	Score	Win	Loss	Save	Attendance	Record
135	September 1	Mariners	2–1	McGowan (9–8)	Green (5–2)	Accardo (27)	30,672	69–66
136	September 2	Mariners	6–4	Burnett (8–7)	Weaver (6–11)	Janssen (5)	32,166	70–66
137	September 3	@ Red Sox	13–10	Matsuzaka (14–11)	Litsch (5–7)	Papelbon (32)	36,639	70–67
138	September 4	@ Red Sox	5–3	Beckett (17–6)	Halladay (14–7)	Papelbon (33)	36,839	70–68
139	September 5	@ Red Sox	6–4	Accardo (4–3)	Okajima (3–2)		37,106	71–68
140	September 7	@ Devil Rays	7–2	McGowan (10–8)	Jackson (4–14)		18,617	72–68
141	September 8	@ Devil Rays	5–4	Reyes (2–2)	Accardo (4–4)		19,822	72–69
142	September 9	@ Devil Rays	3–2	Shields (10–8)	Litsch (5–8)	Reyes (23)	20,556	72–70
143	September 10	@ Tigers	5–4	Bazardo (1–1)	Janssen (2–3)		35,689	72–71
144	September 11	Yankees	9–2	Hughes (3–3)	Marcum (12–6)		30,472	72–72
145	September 12	Yankees	4–1	Mussina (9–10)	McGowan (10–9)	Rivera (26)	27,082	72–73
146	September 13	Yankees	2–1	Downs (3–2)	Britton (0–1)		32,632	73–73
147	September 14	Orioles	6–2	Burres (6–5)	Litsch (5–9)		31,106	73–74
148	September 15	Orioles	8–3	Halladay (15–7)	Birkins (1–2)		37,441	74–74
149	September 16	Orioles	8–6 (12)	Bell (4–3)	Frasor (1–5)	Cabrera (1)	38,934	74–75
150	September 17	Red Sox	6–1	McGowan (11–9)	Wakefield (16–11)		29,316	75–75
151	September 18	Red Sox	4–3	Burnett (9–7)	Gagné (3–2)	Downs (1)	32,390	76–75
152	September 19	Red Sox	6–1	Litsch (6–9)	Buchholz (3–1)	Accardo (28)	34,927	77–75
153	September 21	@ Yankees	5–4 (14)	Kennedy (4–9)	Bruney (3–2)	Frasor (3)	54,151	78–75
154	September 22	@ Yankees	12–11 (10)	Karstens (1–3)	Towers (5–10)		54,887	78–76
155	September 23	@ Yankees	7–5	Mussina (11–10)	McGowan (11–10)	Chamberlain (1)	54,983	78–77
156	September 24	@ Yankees	4–1	Litsch (7–9)	Pettitte (14–9)	Janssen (6)	53,261	79–77
157	September 25	@ Orioles	11–4	Burnett (10–7)	Burres (6–7)		15,867	80–77
158	September 26	@ Orioles	8–5	Halladay (16–7)	Zambrano (0–3)	Accardo (29)	15,424	81–77
159	September 27	@ Orioles	8–5	Hoey (3–4)	Tallet (2–4)	Walker (7)	15,817	81–78
160	September 28	Devil Rays	5–4	McGowan (12–10)	Sonnanstine (6–10)	Accardo (30)	34,670	82–78
161	September 29	Devil Rays	5–3	Downs (4–2)	Wheeler (1–9)		37,681	83–78
162	September 30	Devil Rays	8–5	Hammel (3–5)	Burnett (10–8)	Reyes (26)	44,156	83–79

=== Player stats ===
==== Batting ====
Note: G = Games played; AB = At bats; H = Hits; Avg. = Batting average; HR = Home runs; RBI = Runs batted in; R = Runs; SB = Stolen bases

Player	G	AB	H	Avg.	HR	RBI	R	SB
Russ Adams	27	60	14	.233	2	12	14	2
Howie Clark	31	49	10	.204	0	2	6	1
Royce Clayton	69	189	48	.254	1	12	23	2
Sal Fasano	16	45	8	.178	1	4	5	0
Troy Glaus	115	385	101	.262	20	62	60	0
John-Ford Griffin	6	10	3	.300	1	3	4	0
Aaron Hill	160	608	177	.291	17	78	87	4
Joe Inglett	2	5	3	.600	0	2	0	1
Reed Johnson	79	275	65	.236	2	14	31	4
Adam Lind	89	290	69	.238	11	46	34	1
Hector Luna	22	42	7	.167	1	4	5	2
John McDonald	123	327	82	.251	1	31	32	7
Ray Olmedo	27	51	11	.216	0	1	6	0
Lyle Overbay	122	425	102	.240	10	44	49	2
Jason Phillips	55	144	30	.208	1	12	11	0
Alex Ríos	161	643	191	.297	24	85	114	17
Ryan Roberts	8	13	1	.077	0	0	2	0
Jason Smith	27	52	11	.212	0	4	7	0
Matt Stairs	125	357	103	.289	21	64	58	2
Curtis Thigpen	47	101	24	.238	0	11	13	2
Frank Thomas	155	531	147	.277	26	95	63	0
Vernon Wells	149	584	143	.245	16	80	85	10
Gregg Zaun	110	331	80	.242	10	52	43	0
Pitcher totals	162	19	4	.211	0	1	1	0
Team totals	162	5536	1434	.259	165	719	753	57

As of September 30, 2007

==== Pitching ====
===== Starting and other pitchers =====
Note: GS = Games started; IP = Innings pitched; W = Wins; L = Losses; ERA = Earned run average; BB = Walks allowed; SO = Strikeouts

Player	GS	IP	W	L	ERA	BB	SO
Josh Banks	1	7.1	0	0	7.36	2	2
A. J. Burnett	25	165.2	10	8	3.75	66	176
Gustavo Chacín	5	27.1	2	1	5.60	7	11
Roy Halladay	31	225.1	16	7	3.71	48	139
Jesse Litsch	20	111.0	7	9	3.81	36	50
Shaun Marcum (1 HLD)	25	159.0	12	6	4.13	49	122
Dustin McGowan	27	169.2	12	10	4.08	61	144
Tomo Ohka	10	56.0	2	5	5.79	22	21
Ty Taubenheim	1	5.0	0	0	9.00	4	4
Josh Towers	15	107.0	5	10	5.38	22	76
Víctor Zambrano	2	10.2	0	2	10.97	11	5

As of September 30, 2007

===== Relief pitchers =====
Note: G = Games pitched; IP = Innings pitched; W = Wins; L = Losses; SV = Saves; HLD = Holds; ERA = Earned run average; BB = Walks allowed; SO = Strikeouts

Player	G	IP	W	L	SV	HLD	ERA	BB	SO
Jeremy Accardo	64	67.1	4	4	30	2	2.14	24	57
Jordan De Jong	6	9.0	0	0	0	0	8.00	5	7
Scott Downs	81	58.0	4	2	1	24	2.17	24	57
Jason Frasor	51	57.0	1	5	3	4	4.58	23	59
Lee Gronkiewicz	1	4.0	0	0	0	0	2.25	2	2
Casey Janssen	70	72.2	2	3	6	24	2.35	20	39
Joe Kennedy	9	7.0	1	0	0	2	5.14	5	8
Brandon League	14	11.2	0	0	0	0	6.17	7	7
B. J. Ryan	5	4.1	0	2	3	0	12.46	4	3
Brian Tallet	48	62.1	2	4	0	1	3.47	28	54
Jamie Vermilyea	2	6.0	0	0	0	0	0.00	0	2
Brian Wolfe	38	45.1	3	1	0	6	2.98	9	22
Team Pitching Totals	162	1448.2	83	79	44	64	4.00	479	1067

As of September 30, 2007

== Draft ==
This is a partial list. For the full draft, see here.

== Players selected ==
Round	Pick	Player	Nationality	School
1	16 (for Frank Catalanotto)	Kevin Ahrens (SS)	United States	Memorial High School
1	21	J. P. Arencibia (C)	United States	Tennessee
C-A	38 (for Justin Speier)	Brett Cecil (LHP)	United States	Maryland-College Park
C-A	45 (for Frank Catalanotto)	Justin Jackson (SS)	United States	T.C. Roberson High School
C-A	56 (for Ted Lilly)	Trystan Magnuson (RHP)	Canada	Louisville
2	85	John Tolisano (2B)	United States	Estero High School
2	88 (for Justin Speier)	Eric Eiland (CF)	United States	Lamar High School
3	115	Alan Farina (RHP)	United States	Clemson
4	145	Brad Mills (LHP)	United States	Arizona
5	175	Marc Rzepczynski (LHP)	United States	UC-Riverside

== Farm system ==
Level	Team	League	Manager
AAA	Syracuse Chiefs	International League	Doug Davis
AA	New Hampshire Fisher Cats	Eastern League	Bill Masse
A	Dunedin Blue Jays	Florida State League	Omar Malavé
A	Lansing Lugnuts	Midwest League	Gary Cathcart
A-Short Season	Auburn Doubledays	New York–Penn League	Dennis Holmberg
Rookie	GCL Blue Jays	Gulf Coast League	Clayton McCullough

LEAGUE CHAMPIONS: Auburn
