= 2007 Boston Red Sox season =

Major League Baseball season

2007 Boston Red Sox
- World Series champions American League champions American League East champions
- League: American League
- Division: East
- Ballpark: Fenway Park
- City: Boston, Massachusetts
- Record: 96–66 (.593)
- Divisional place: 1st
- Owners: John W. Henry (New England Sports Ventures)
- President: Larry Lucchino
- General manager: Theo Epstein
- Manager: Terry Francona
- Television: New England Sports Network
- Radio: WRKO; WEEI; WROL (Spanish)
- Stats: ESPN.com; Baseball Reference

The 2007 Boston Red Sox season was the 107th season in the franchise's Major League Baseball history. Managed by Terry Francona, the Red Sox finished first in the American League East with a record of 96–66. In the postseason, the Red Sox first swept the American League West champion Los Angeles Angels of Anaheim in the ALDS. In the ALCS, the Red Sox defeated the American League Central champion Cleveland Indians in seven games, despite falling behind 3–1 in the series. Advancing to the World Series, the Red Sox swept the National League champion Colorado Rockies, to capture their second championship in four years.

== Off-season ==
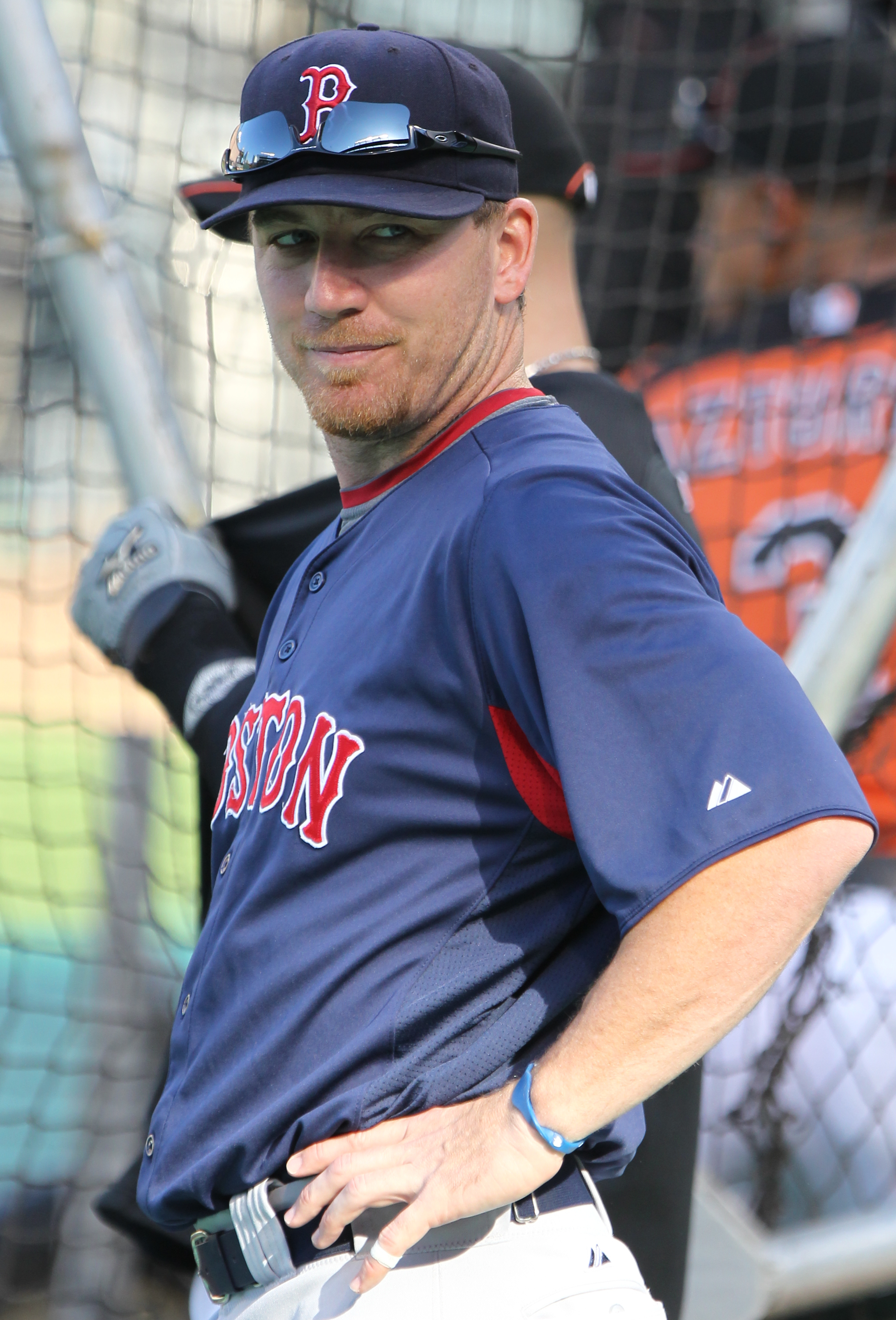
J. D. Drew

On November 14, 2006, Major League Baseball announced that the Red Sox had competed for the rights to negotiate a contract with Japanese pitcher Daisuke Matsuzaka. Boston won with a bid of US$51.1 million and had 30 days to complete a deal. On December 13, 2006, the day before the deadline, Matsuzaka signed a six-year contract worth $52 million.

It was initially announced that closer Jonathan Papelbon would become a starter in 2007, partially to protect his arm from the injury that sidelined him. Pitchers Hideki Okajima, J. C. Romero and Joel Piñeiro were signed as free agents. Brendan Donnelly was acquired from the Los Angeles Angels in a trade for pitcher Phil Seibel.

However, there was no clear candidate for the closer role. Papelbon wanted to re-fill that spot, and team officials believed he had rehabilitated himself so well in the offseason that his health of this shoulder was no longer a concern, and allowed him to return to the bullpen.

The Red Sox lost free agent Álex González to the Cincinnati Reds (leading the Red Sox to sign Julio Lugo) and Mark Loretta to the Houston Astros (allowing Dustin Pedroia to become the team's starting second baseman). Trot Nixon, also a free agent, signed with the Cleveland Indians, creating the need for a right fielder. The Red Sox pursued J. D. Drew, who had recently opted out of the remainder of his contract with the Los Angeles Dodgers to become a free agent. However, the Red Sox medical staff had concerns about Drew's previously injured shoulder. On January 25, 2007, the Red Sox and Drew agreed to a five-year deal worth $70 million.

Outfielder Gabe Kapler, age 31, announced his retirement to fulfill his lifelong dream of becoming a coach. The Red Sox named him manager of their single-A affiliate, the Greenville Drive.

At the end of spring training of 2007, the Red Sox traded minor league veteran catcher Alberto Castillo for Baltimore Orioles outfielder Cory Keylor.

== Regular season ==
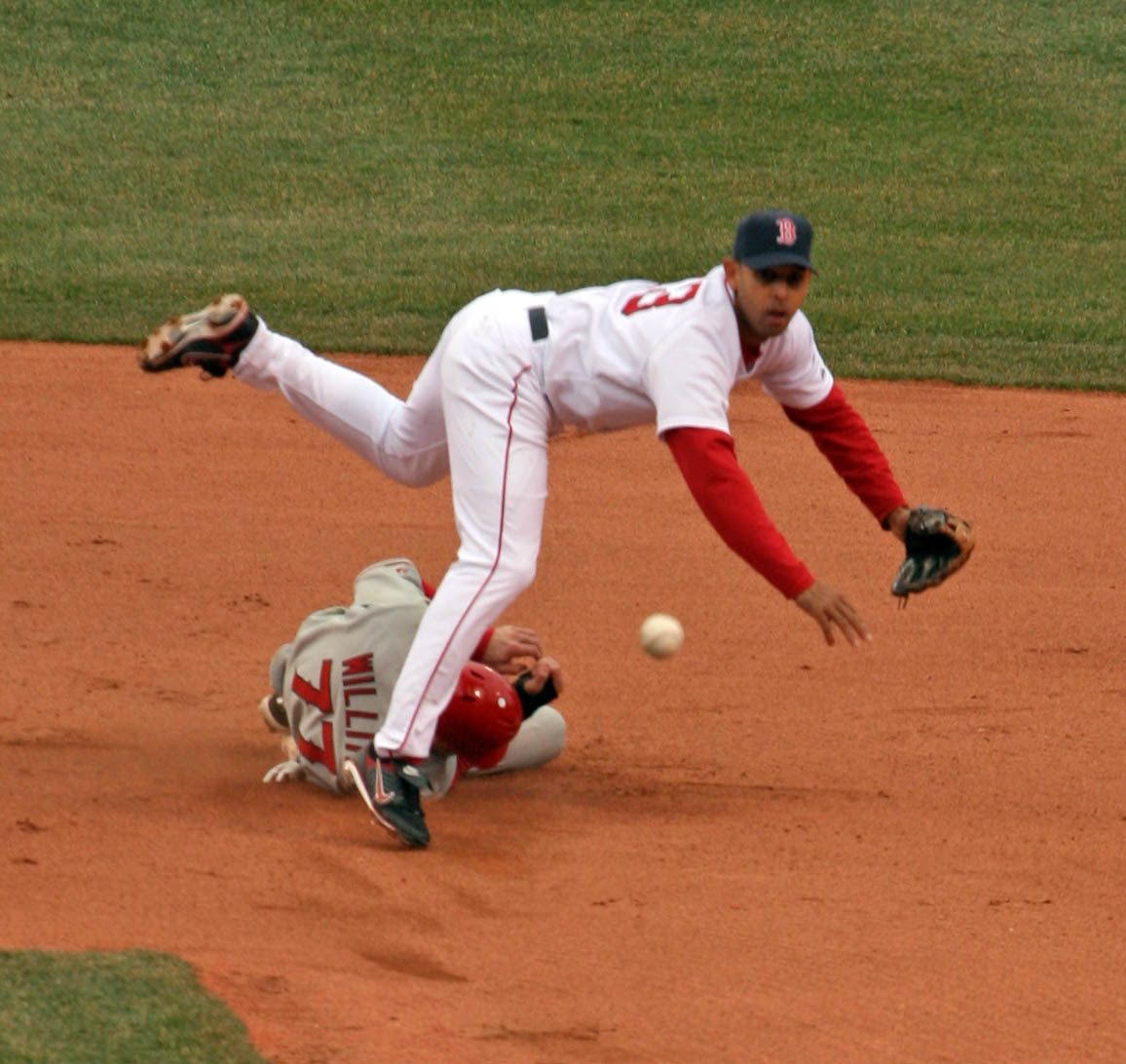
Alex Cora turning a double-play against the Los Angeles Angels of Anaheim at Fenway Park on April 16, 2007

=== Opening Day lineup ===
23	Julio Lugo	SS
20	Kevin Youkilis	1B
34	David Ortiz	DH
24	Manny Ramirez	LF
7	J. D. Drew	RF
25	Mike Lowell	3B
33	Jason Varitek	C
10	Coco Crisp	CF
15	Dustin Pedroia	2B
38	Curt Schilling	P

=== Honoring a Boston legend ===
Bright green jerseys, with "Red Sox" in white letters outlined in red across the front, were worn on April 20 to honor former Boston Celtics coach, general manager, and president Red Auerbach, who had died during the previous off-season. The jerseys also had players' names on the back, believed to be a first for Red Sox home uniforms.

=== Season standings ===
AL East
Team	W	L	Pct.	GB	Home	Road
Boston Red Sox	96	66	.593	—	51‍–‍30	45‍–‍36
New York Yankees	94	68	.580	2	52‍–‍29	42‍–‍39
Toronto Blue Jays	83	79	.512	13	49‍–‍32	34‍–‍47
Baltimore Orioles	69	93	.426	27	35‍–‍46	34‍–‍47
Tampa Bay Devil Rays	66	96	.407	30	37‍–‍44	29‍–‍52

=== Record vs. opponents ===
2007 American League record Source: MLB Standings Grid – 2007
Team	BAL	BOS	CWS	CLE	DET	KC	LAA	MIN	NYY	OAK	SEA	TB	TEX	TOR	NL
Baltimore	—	6–12	5–3	3–4	1–5	7–0	3–7	0–7	9–9	4–4	2–7	11–7	4–6	8–10	6–12
Boston	12–6	—	7–1	5–2	3–4	3–3	6–4	4–3	8–10	4–4	4–5	13–5	6–4	9–9	12–6
Chicago	3–5	1–7	—	7–11	11–7	12–6	5–4	9–9	4–6	4–5	1–7	6–1	2–4	3–4	4–14
Cleveland	4–3	2–5	11–7	—	12–6	11–7	5–5	14–4	0–6	6–4	4–3	8–2	6–3	4–2	9–9
Detroit	5–1	4–3	7–11	6–12	—	11–7	3–5	12–6	4–4	4–6	6–4	3–4	5–4	4–3	14–4
Kansas City	0–7	3–3	6–12	7–11	7–11	—	5–2	9–9	1–9	6–4	3–6	4–3	5–4	3–4	10–8
Los Angeles	7–3	4–6	4–5	5–5	5–3	2–5	—	6–3	6–3	9–10	13–6	6–2	10–9	3–4	14–4
Minnesota	7–0	3–4	9–9	4–14	6–12	9–9	3–6	—	2–5	5–2	6–3	3–4	7–2	4–6	11–7
New York	9–9	10–8	6–4	6–0	4–4	9–1	3–6	5–2	—	2–4	5–5	10–8	5–1	10–8	10–8
Oakland	4–4	4–4	5–4	4–6	6–4	4–6	10–9	2–5	4–2	—	5–14	4–6	9–10	5–4	10–8
Seattle	7–2	5–4	7–1	3–4	4–6	6–3	6–13	3–6	5–5	14–5	—	4–3	11–8	4–5	9–9
Tampa Bay	7–11	5–13	1–6	2–8	4–3	3–4	2–6	4–3	8–10	6–4	3–4	—	5–4	9–9	7–11
Texas	6–4	4–6	4–2	3–6	4–5	4–5	9–10	2–7	1–5	10–9	8–11	4–5	—	5–5	11–7
Toronto	10–8	9–9	4–3	2–4	3–4	4–3	4–3	6–4	8–10	4–5	5–4	9–9	5–5	—	10–8

Red Sox vs. National League
Team	NL West					
Team	ARI	COL	LAD	SDP	SFG	ATL
Boston	2–1	1–2	—	2–1	3–0	4–2

=== Notable transactions ===
- November 30, 2006: Hideki Okajima signed as a free agent with the Red Sox.
- December 6, 2006: Julio Lugo signed as a free agent with the Red Sox.
- December 14, 2006: Daisuke Matsuzaka was purchased by the Red Sox from Seibu Lions.
- December 15, 2006: J. C. Romero signed as a free agent with the Red Sox.
- January 4, 2007: Joel Piñeiro signed as a free agent with the Red Sox.
- February 14, 2007: J. D. Drew signed as a free agent with the Red Sox.
- June 18, 2007: J. C. Romero was released by the Red Sox.
- July 31, 2007: Éric Gagné was acquired by the Red Sox from the Rangers in exchange for Engel Beltré, Kason Gabbard and David Murphy. In a separate trade, minor leaguer Sean Danielson was acquired by the Red Sox from the Cardinals in exchange for Joel Piñeiro.
- August 6, 2007: Bobby Kielty signed as a free agent with the Red Sox.
- August 21, 2007: Minor leaguer Chris Carter was acquired by the Red Sox from the Nationals. Four days earlier, the Red Sox traded outfielder Wily Mo Peña to the Nationals.
- August 23, 2007: Royce Clayton signed as a free agent with the Red Sox.

=== Game log ===
2007 game log
April (16–8)

#	Date	Opponent	Score	Win	Loss	Save	Attendance	Record
1	April 2	@ Royals	7–1	Meche (1–0)	Schilling (0–1)		41,257	0–1
2	April 4	@ Royals	7–1	Beckett (1–0)	Pérez (0 – 1)		22,348	1-1
3	April 5	@ Royals	4–1	Matsuzaka (1–0)	Greinke (0–1)	Papelbon (1)	23,170	2–1
4	April 6	@ Rangers	2–0	Tejeda (1–0)	Wakefield (0–1)	Otsuka (1)	51,548	2-2
5	April 7	@ Rangers	8–2	Millwood (1–0)	Tavárez (0–1)		40,865	2–3
6	April 8	@ Rangers	3–2	Schilling (1-1)	Padilla (0–2)	Papelbon (2)	28,347	3-3
7	April 10	Mariners	14–3	Beckett (2–0)	Weaver (0–1)		35,847	4–3
8	April 11	Mariners	3–0	Hernández (2–0)	Matsuzaka (1-1)		36,630	4-4
--	April 12	Mariners	Postponed (rain) Rescheduled for May 3					4-4
9	April 13	Angels	10–1	Wakefield (1-1)	Lackey (2–1)		35,946	5–4
10	April 14	Angels	8–0	Schilling (2–1)	Carrasco (0–1)		36,300	6–4
--	April 15	Angels	Postponed (rain) Rescheduled for August 17					6–4
11	April 16	Angels	7–2	Beckett (3–0)	Santana (1–2)		35,424	7–4
12	April 17	@ Blue Jays	2–1	Chacín (2–0)	Matsuzaka (1–2)	Frasor (1)	42,162	7–5
13	April 18	@ Blue Jays	4–1	Wakefield (2–1)	Ohka (0–2)	Papelbon (3)	20,188	8–5
14	April 19	@ Blue Jays	5–3	Timlin (1–0)	Marcum (1-1)	Papelbon (4)	33,297	9–5
15	April 20	Yankees	7–6	Snyder (1–0)	Rivera (1–2)	Okajima (1)	36,786	10–5
16	April 21	Yankees	7–5	Beckett (4–0)	Karstens (0–1)	Papelbon (5)	36,342	11–5
17	April 22	Yankees	7–6	Matsuzaka (2-2)	Proctor (0–1)	Papelbon (6)	36,905	12–5
18	April 23	Blue Jays	7–3	Ohka (1–2)	Wakefield (2-2)	Frasor (2)	36,669	12–6
19	April 24	Blue Jays	10–3	Halladay (3–0)	Tavárez (0–2)		37,161	12–7
20	April 25	@ Orioles	6–1	Schilling (3–1)	Cabrera (1–2)		27,613	13–7
21	April 26	@ Orioles	5–2	Beckett (5–0)	Ray (2-2)	Papelbon (7)	33,522	14–7
22	April 27	@ Yankees	11–4	Matsuzaka (3–2)	Pettitte (1-1)		55,005	15–7
23	April 28	@ Yankees	3–1	Igawa (2–1)	Wakefield (2–3)	Rivera (1)	55,026	15–8
24	April 29	@ Yankees	7–4	Tavárez (1–2)	Wang (0–2)	Papelbon (8)	54,856	16–8

May (20–8)

#	Date	Opponent	Score	Win	Loss	Save	Attendance	Record
25	May 1	Athletics	5–4 (10)	Duchscherer (2–1)	Donnelly (0–1)	Street (7)	37,052	16–9
26	May 2	Athletics	6–4	Beckett (6–0)	Marshall (1-1)	Timlin (1)	37,006	17–9
27	May 3	Mariners	8–7	Donnelly(1-1)	Reitsma (0–1)	Romero (1)	37,216	18–9
28	May 4	@ Twins	2–0	Wakefield (3-3)	Silva (2-2)	Papelbon (9)	34,951	19–9
29	May 5	@ Twins	2–1	Santana (4–2)	Tavárez (1–3)	Nathan (8)	40,088	19–10
30	May 6	@ Twins	4–3	Schilling (4–1)	Ponson (2–4)	Papelbon (10)	27,807	20–10
31	May 8	@ Blue Jays	9–2	Beckett (7–0)	Zambrano (0–2)		41,203	21–10
32	May 9	@ Blue Jays	9–3	Matsuzaka (4–2)	Ohka (2-4-)		21,784	22–10
33	May 10	@ Blue Jays	8–0	Wakefield (4–3)	Halladay (4–2)		22,290	23–10
34	May 11	Orioles	6–3	Burres (1-1)	Tavárez (1–4)	Ray (8)	37,039	23–11
35	May 12	Orioles	13–4	López (1–0)	Leicester (0–1)		36,503	24–11
36	May 13	Orioles	6–5	Romero (1–0)	Ray (3-3)		36,379	25–11
37	May 14	Tigers	7–1	Matsuzaka (5–2)	Robertson (3-3)		36,935	26–11
38	May 15	Tigers	7–2	Verlander (3–1)	Wakefield (4-4)		37,031	26–12
--	May 16	Tigers	Postponed (rain) Rescheduled for May 17					26–12
39	May 17	Tigers	2–1	Tavárez (2–4)	Miner (0–1)	Papelbon (11)	36,767	27–12
40	May 17	Tigers	4–2	Donnelly (2–1)	Ledezma (0–1)	Okajima (2)	37,006	28–12
--	May 18	Braves	Postponed (rain) Rescheduled for May 19					28–12
41	May 19	Braves	13–3	Matsuzaka (6–2)	Lerew (0–2)		36,358	29–12
42	May 19	Braves	14–0	Smoltz (6–2)	Hansack (0–1)		36,792	29–13
43	May 20	Braves	6–3	Gabbard (1–0)	Hudson (5–2)		36,140	30–13
44	May 21	@ Yankees	6–2	Wang (3-3)	Wakefield (4–5)		55,078	30–14
45	May 22	@ Yankees	7–3	Tavárez (3–4)	Mussina		54,739	31–14
46	May 23	@ Yankees	8–3	Pettitte' (3-3)	Schilling (4–2)		55,000	31–15
47	May 25	@ Rangers	10–6	Matsuzaka (7–2)	Littleton (0–1)		33,552	32–15
48	May 26	@ Rangers	7–4	Wakefield (5-5)	Padilla (2–7)	Papelbon (12)	37,974	33–15
49	May 27	@ Rangers	6–5	Piñeiro (1–0)	Otsuka (1-1)	Okajima (3)	40,323	34–15
50	May 28	Indians	5–3	Schilling (5–2)	Lee (2-2)	Papelbon (13)	36,910	35–15
51	May 29	Indians	4–2	Beckett (8–0)	Sowers (1–5)	Okajima (4)	37,076	36–15
52	May 30	Indians	8–4	Byrd (6–1)	Matsuzaka (7–3)		37,091	36–16

June (13–14)

#	Date	Opponent	Score	Win	Loss	Save	Attendance	Record
53	June 1	Yankees	9–5	Wang (4-4)	Wakefield (5–6)		36,785	36–17
54	June 2	Yankees	11–6	Okajima (1–0)	Proctor (0–3)		36,294	37–17
55	June 3	Yankees	6–5	Bruney (2–1)	Papelbon (0–1)	Rivera (5)	36,793	37–18
56	June 4	@ Athletics	5–4 (11)	Casilla (1–0)	Snyder (1-1)		28,177	37–19
57	June 5	@ Athletics	2–0	DiNardo (2-2)	Matsuzaka (7–4)	Embree (5)	31,127	37–20
58	June 6	@ Athletics	3–2	Kennedy (2–4)	Wakefield (5–7)	Casilla (1)	32,280	37–21
59	June 7	@ Athletics	1–0	Schilling (6–2)	Blanton (5–4)		31,211	38–21
60	June 8	@ D-backs	10–3	Beckett (9–0)	Davis (4–7)		40,435	39–21
61	June 9	@ D-backs	4–3 (10)	Okajima (2–0)	Cruz (2–1)	Papelbon (14)	49,826	40–21
62	June 10	@ D-backs	5–1	Johnson (4–2)	Matsuzaka (7–5)		46,622	40–22
63	June 12	Rockies	2–1	Wakefield (6–7)	Cook (4–3)	Papelbon (15)	37,008	41–22
64	June 13	Rockies	12–2	Fogg (2–5)	Schilling (6–3)		36,808	41–23
65	June 14	Rockies	7–1	Francis (6–5)	Beckett (9–1)		36,936	41–24
66	June 15	Giants	10–2	Tavárez (4-4)	Zito (6–7)		36,508	42–24
67	June 16	Giants	1–0	Matsuzaka (8–5)	Cain (2–7)	Papelbon (16)	36,381	43–24
68	June 17	Giants	9–5	Wakefield (7-7)	Morris (7–4)		36,137	44–24
69	June 18	@ Braves	9–4	James (6-6)	Schilling (6–4)		47,562	44–25
70	June 19	@ Braves	4–0	Beckett (10–1)	Hudson (6–5)		47,910	45–25
71	June 20	@ Braves	11–0	Tavárez (5–4)	Carlyle (1–2)		49,585	46–25
72	June 22	@ Padres	2–1	Matsuzaka (9–5)	Maddux (6–4)	Papelbon (17)	44,405	47–25
73	June 23	@ Padres	6–1	Young (7–3)	Wakefield (7–8)		44,457	47–26
74	June 24	@ Padres	4–2	Beckett (11–1)	Peavy (9–2)	Papelbon (18)	44,449	48–26
75	June 25	@ Mariners	9–5	Weaver (2–6)	Tavárez (5-5)		33,830	48–27
76	June 26	@ Mariners	8–7	O'Flaherty (5–0)	Lopez (1-1)	Putz (22)	35,045	48–28
77	June 27	@ Mariners	2–1 (11)	Davis (2–0)	Piñeiro (1-1)		43,448	48–29
78	June 29	Rangers	2–1	Wakefield (8-8)	Wright (1–2)	Papelbon (19)	36,756	49–29
79	June 30	Rangers	5–4	Mahay (1–0)	Beckett (11–2)	Gagné (9)	36,747	49–31

July (15-12)

#	Date	Opponent	Score	Win	Loss	Save	Attendance	Record
80	July 1	Rangers	2–1	Loe (5–6)	Tavárez (5–6)	Gagné (10)	36,378	49–31
81	July 2	Rangers	7–3	Gabbard (2–0)	McCarthy (4–5)		36,778	50–31
82	July 3	Devil Rays	4–1	Matsuzaka (10–5)	Kazmir (5-5)		37,005	51–31
83	July 4	Devil Rays	7–5	Wakefield (9–8)	Jackson (1–9)	Papelbon (20)	36,629	52–31
84	July 5	Devil Rays	15–4	Beckett (12–2)	Howell (1–3)		37,044	53–31
85	July 6	@ Tigers	9–2	Miller (4–2)	Tavárez (5–7)		43,839	53–32
86	July 7	@ Tigers	3–2 (13)	Grilli (3–2)	Papelbon (0–2)		44,193	53–33
87	July 8	@ Tigers	6–5	Robertson (5–6)	Matsuzaka (10–6)	Jones (22)	41,943	53–34
88	July 12	Blue Jays	7–4	Wakefield (10–8)	Halladay (10–4)	Papelbon (21)	36,887	54–34
89	July 13	Blue Jays	6–5	Marcum (5–3)	Snyder (1–2)	Accardo (12)	36,908	54–35
90	July 14	Blue Jays	9–4	Matsuzaka (11–6)	McGowan (5-5)		36,830	55–35
91	July 15	Blue Jays	2–1	Litsch (2–3)	Beckett (12–3)	Accardo (13)	36,301	55–36
92	July 16	Royals	4–0	Gabbard (3–0)	Bannister (5–6)		37,099	56–36
93	July 17	Royals	9–3	Gobble (4–1)	Wakefield (10–9)		37,001	56–37
94	July 18	Royals	6–5	Pérez (5–8)	Tavárez (5–8)	Dotel (10)	36,681	56–38
95	July 19	White Sox	4–2	Vázquez (7–5)	Matsuzaka (11–7)	Jenks (26)	36,913	56–39
96	July 20	White Sox	10–3	Beckett (13–3)	Contreras (5–12)		36,737	57–39
97	July 21	White Sox	11–2	Gabbard (4–0)	Danks (6–7)		36,283	58–39
98	July 22	White Sox	8–5	Wakefield (11–9)	Garland (7-7)	Papelbon (22)	36,346	59–39
99	July 23	@ Indians	6–2	Lester (1–0)	Westbrook (1–6)	Delcarmen (1)	32,439	60–39
100	July 24	@ Indians	1–0	Matsuzaka (12–7)	Sabathia (13–5)	Papelbon (23)	39,339	61–39
101	July 25	@ Indians	1–0	Carmona (13–4)	Beckett (13–4)	Borowski (29)	29,614	61–40
102	July 26	@ Indians	14–9	Tavárez (6–8)	Lee (5–8)		34,286	62–40
103	July 27	@ Devil Rays	7–1	Wakefield (12–9)	Hammel (1-1)		33,144	63–40
104	July 28	@ Devil Rays	12–6 (12)	Snyder (2-2)	Stokes (2–7)		36,048	64–40
105	July 29	@ Devil Rays	5–2	Glover (4–3)	Matsuzaka (12–8)		34,813	64–41
106	July 31	Orioles	5–3	Bédard (11–4)	Beckett (13–5)	Walker (4)	36,866	64–42

August (16–13)

#	Date	Opponent	Score	Win	Loss	Save	Attendance	Record
107	August 1	Orioles	5–4	López (2–1)	Parrish (2-2)	Papelbon (24)	36,649	65-42
108	August 2	Orioles	7–4	Wakefield (13–9)	Bell (3–2)		36,457	66-42
109	August 3	@ Mariners	7–4	Green (5–1)	Timlin (1-1)	Putz (32)	46,235	66–43
110	August 4	@ Mariners	4–3	Matsuzaka (13–8)	Washburn (8-8)	Papelbon (25)	46,313	67–43
111	August 5	@ Mariners	9–2	Beckett (14–5)	Batista (11–8)		46,377	68–43
112	August 6	@ Angels	4–2	Speier (1–2)	Schilling (6–5)	Rodríguez (28)	44,142	68–44
113	August 7	@ Angels	10–4	Saunders (6–0)	Wakefield (13–10)		44,177	68–45
114	August 8	@ Angels	9–6	Okajima (3–0)	Speier (1–3)	Papelbon (26)	44,243	69–45
115	August 10	@ Orioles	6–5	Hoey (1–0)	Okajima (3–1)		48,993	69–46
116	August 11	@ Orioles	6–2	Beckett (15–5)	Olson (1-1)	Papelbon (27)	49,242	70–46
117	August 12	@ Orioles	6–3 (10)	Bradford (1–4)	Snyder (2–3)		48,551	70–47
118	August 13	Devil Rays	3–0	Wakefield (14–10)	Shields (9–8)	Papelbon (28)	36,808	71–47
119	August 14	Devil Rays	2–1	Gagné (3–0)	Reyes (1–2)		36,837	72–47
120	August 15	Devil Rays	6–5	Sonnanstine (2–8)	Matsuzaka (13–9)	Reyes (18)	36,413	72–48
121	August 17	Angels	8–4	Buchholz (1–0)	Lackey (15–7)	Papelbon (29)	36,686	73–48
122	August 17	Angels	7–5	Rodríguez (5–2)	Gagné (3–1)		36,538	73–49
123	August 18	Angels	10–5	Schilling (7–5)	Jer Weaver (8–6)		36,652	74–49
124	August 19	Angels	3–1	Saunders (7–1)	Tavárez (6–9)	Rodríguez (31)	36,346	74–50
125	August 20	@ Devil Rays	6–0	Wakefield (15–10)	Kazmir (9–8)		16,843	75–50
126	August 21	@ Devil Rays	8–6	Lester (2–0)	Sonnanstine (2–9)	Papelbon (30)	16,393	76–50
127	August 22	@ Devil Rays	2–1	Jackson (4–12)	Matsuzaka (13–10)	Reyes (19)	17,839	76–51
--	August 23	@ White Sox	Postponed (rain) Rescheduled for August 24					76–51
128	August 24	@ White Sox	11–3	Beckett (16–5)	Garland (8–10)		30,581	77–51
129	August 24	@ White Sox	10–1	Schilling (8–5)	Danks (6–12)		37,639	78–51
130	August 25	@ White Sox	14–2	Wakefield (16–10)	Buehrle (9-9)		38,874	79–51
131	August 26	@ White Sox	11–1	Tavárez (7–9)	Vázquez (11–7)		36,745	80–51
132	August 28	@ Yankees	5–3	Pettitte (12–7)	Matsuzaka (13–11)	Rivera (21)	55,037	80–52
133	August 29	@ Yankees	4–3	Clemens (6–5)	Beckett (16–6)	Rivera (22)	54,986	80–53
134	August 30	@ Yankees	5–0	Wang (16–6)	Schilling (8–6)		55,067	80–54
135	August 31	Orioles	9–8	Birkins (1-1)	Tavárez (7–10)	Báez (3)	36,810	80–55

September (16–11)

#	Date	Opponent	Score	Win	Loss	Save	Attendance	Record
136	September 1	Orioles	10–0	Buchholz (2–0)	Olson (1–3)		36,819	81–55
137	September 2	Orioles	3–2	Lester (3–0)	Cabrera (9–14)	Papelbon (31)	36,340	82–55
138	September 3	Blue Jays	13–10	Matsuzaka (14–11)	Litsch (5–7)	Papelbon (32)	36,639	83–55
139	September 4	Blue Jays	5–3	Beckett (17–6)	Halladay (14–7)	Papelbon (33)	36,839	84–55
140	September 5	Blue Jays	6–4	Accardo (4–3)	Okajima (3–2)		37,106	84–56
141	September 6	@ Orioles	7–6	Buchholz (3–0)	Báez (0–6)	Papelbon (34)	27,472	85–56
142	September 7	@ Orioles	4–0	Lester (4–0)	Cabrera (9–15)		34,091	86–56
143	September 8	@ Orioles	11–5	Leicester (1-1)	Matsuzaka (14–12)		48,043	86–57
144	September 9	@ Orioles	3–2	Beckett (18–6)	Bradford (3–7)	Papelbon (35)	39,234	87–57
145	September 10	Devil Rays	1–0	Kazmir (12–8)	Schilling (8–7)	Reyes (24)	36,907	87–58
146	September 11	Devil Rays	16–10	Corey (1–0)	Switzer (0–1)		36,640	88–58
147	September 12	Devil Rays	5–4	Papelbon (1–2)	Reyes (2–3)		36,931	89–58
148	September 14	Yankees	8–7	Bruney (3–1)	Papelbon (1–3)	Rivera (27)	36,590	89–59
149	September 15	Yankees	10–1	Beckett (19–6)	Wang (18–7)		36,215	90–59
150	September 16	Yankees	4–3	Chamberlain (2–0)	Schilling (8-8)	Rivera (28)	36,533	90–60
151	September 17	@ Blue Jays	6–1	McGowan (11–9)	Wakefield (16–11)		29,316	90–61
152	September 18	@ Blue Jays	4–3	Burnett (9–7)	Gagné (3–2)	Downs (1)	32,290	90–62
153	September 19	@ Blue Jays	6–1	Litsch (6–9)	Buchholz (3–1)	Accardo (28)	34,927	90–63
154	September 21	@ Devil Rays	8–1	Beckett (20–6)	Kazmir (13–9)		27,369	91–63
155	September 22	@ Devil Rays	8–6	Gagné (4–2)	Reyes (2–4)	Papelbon (36)	34,626	92–63
156	September 23	@ Devil Rays	5–4	Jackson (5–15)	Wakefield (16–12)	Reyes (25)	30,310	92–64
157	September 25	Athletics	7–3	Schilling (9–8)	Gaudin (11–13)		36,708	93–64
158	September 26	Athletics	11–6	Timlin (2–1)	Blevins (0–1)		36,570	94–64
159	September 27	Twins	5–4	Bonser (8–12)	Beckett (20–7)	Nathan (36)	36,743	94–65
160	September 28	Twins	5–2	Matsuzaka (15–12)	Slowey (4–1)	Papelbon (37)	36,843	95–65
161	September 29	Twins	4–6	Wakefield (17–12)	Blackburn (0–2)	Okajima (5)	36,619	96–65
162	September 30	Twins	3–2	Garza (5–7)	Tavárez (7–11)	Nathan (37)	36,364	96–66

== Postseason ==
=== ALDS vs. Los Angeles Angels of Anaheim ===
- Boston wins series 3–0

Game	Score	Date
1	Los Angeles Angels 0, Boston Red Sox 4	October 3
2	Los Angeles Angels 3, Boston Red Sox 6	October 5
3	Boston Red Sox 9, Los Angeles Angels 3	October 7

=== ALCS vs. Cleveland Indians ===
- Boston wins series 4–3

Game	Score	Date
1	Cleveland Indians 3, Boston Red Sox 10	October 12
2	Cleveland Indians 13, Boston Red Sox 6	October 13
3	Boston Red Sox 2, Cleveland Indians 4	October 15
4	Boston Red Sox 3, Cleveland Indians 7	October 16
5	Boston Red Sox 7, Cleveland Indians 3	October 18
6	Cleveland Indians 2, Boston Red Sox 12	October 20
7	Cleveland Indians 2, Boston Red Sox 11	October 21

=== World Series vs. Colorado Rockies ===
- Boston wins series 4–0

Game	Score	Date
1	Colorado Rockies 1, Boston Red Sox 13	October 24
2	Colorado Rockies 1, Boston Red Sox 2	October 25
3	Boston Red Sox 10, Colorado Rockies 5	October 27
4	Boston Red Sox 4, Colorado Rockies 3	October 28

- The Red Sox set an MLB post-season record by outscoring their collective opponents 99–46.

== Roster ==
2007 Boston Red Sox
Roster		Manager, Coaches
Pitchers: 19 Josh Beckett; 61 Clay Buchholz; 41 Bryan Corey; 17 Manny Delcarmen; 53 Brendan Donnelly; 61 Kason Gabbard; 83 Éric Gagné; 46,43 Devern Hansack; 31 Jon Lester; 48 Javier López; 18 Daisuke Matsuzaka; 37 Hideki Okajima; 58 Jonathan Papelbon; 36 Joel Piñeiro; 32 J. C. Romero; 38 Curt Schilling; 39 Kyle Snyder; 51 Julián Tavárez; 50 Mike Timlin; 49 Tim Wakefield; Catchers: 36 Kevin Cash; 28 Doug Mirabelli; 33 Jason Varitek	Infielders: 55 Jeff Bailey; 11,3 Royce Clayton; 13 Alex Cora; 12 Eric Hinske; 25 Mike Lowell; 23 Julio Lugo; 34 David Ortiz; 15 Dustin Pedroia; 20 Kevin Youkilis; Outfielders: 10 Coco Crisp; 7 J. D. Drew; 46 Jacoby Ellsbury; 32 Bobby Kielty; 44 Brandon Moss; 44 David Murphy; 22 Wily Mo Peña; 24 Manny Ramirez	Manager: 47 Terry Francona; Coaches: 16 Luis Alicea (First Base); 52 John Farrell (Pitching); 35 DeMarlo Hale (Third Base); 29 Dave Magadan (Hitting); 2 Brad Mills (Bench); 57 Gary Tuck (Bullpen)

== Player stats ==
=== Batting ===
==== Starters by position ====
Note: Pos = Position; G = Games played; AB = At bats; H = Hits; Avg. = Batting average; HR = Home runs; RBI = Runs batted in

Pos	Player	G	AB	H	Avg.	HR	RBI
C	Jason Varitek	131	435	111	.255	17	68
1B	Kevin Youkilis	145	528	152	.288	16	83
2B	Dustin Pedroia	139	520	165	.317	8	50
SS	Julio Lugo	147	570	135	.237	8	73
3B	Mike Lowell	154	589	191	.324	21	120
LF	Manny Ramírez	133	483	143	.296	20	88
CF	Coco Crisp	145	526	141	.268	6	60
RF	J. D. Drew	140	466	126	.270	11	64
DH	David Ortiz	149	549	182	.332	35	117

==== Other batters ====
Note: G = Games played; AB = At bat; H = Hits; Avg. = Batting average; HR = Home runs; RBI = Runs batted in

Player	G	AB	H	Avg.	HR	RBI
Alex Cora	83	207	51	.246	3	18
Eric Hinske	84	186	38	.204	6	21
Willy Mo Peña	73	156	34	.218	5	17
Jacoby Ellsbury	33	116	41	.353	3	18
Doug Mirabelli	48	114	23	.202	5	16
Bobby Kielty	33	87	19	.218	1	12
Kevin Cash	12	27	3	.111	0	4
Brandon Moss	15	25	7	.280	0	1
Jeff Bailey	3	9	1	.111	1	1
Royce Clayton	8	6	0	.000	0	0
David Murphy	3	2	1	.500	0	0

=== Pitching ===
==== Starting pitchers ====
Note: GS = Games started; IP = Innings pitched; W = Wins; L = Losses; ERA = Earned run average; SO = Strikeouts

Player	GS	IP	W	L	ERA	SO
Daisuke Matsuzaka	32	204.2	15	12	4.40	201
Josh Beckett	30	200.2	20	7	3.27	194
Tim Wakefield	31	189.0	16	12	4.76	110
Curt Schilling	24	151.0	9	8	3.87	101
Julián Tavárez*	23	137.0	6	11	5.22	68
Jon Lester*	11	61.0	4	0	4.72	66
Kason Gabbard	7	41.0	4	0	3.73	29

==== Spot-starting pitchers ====
Note: GS = Games started; IP = Innings pitched; W = Wins; L = Losses; ERA = Earned run average; SO = Strikeouts

Player	GS	IP	W	L	ERA	SO
Clay Buchholz	3	22.2	2	1	1.59	22
Devern Hansack	1	7.2	0	1	4.70	5

==== Relief pitchers ====
Note: G = Games pitched; W = Wins; L = Losses; SV = Saves; ERA = Earned run average; SO = Strikeouts

Player	G	W	L	SV	ERA	SO
Jonathan Papelbon	59	1	3	37	1.85	84
Hideki Okajima	66	3	2	5	2.22	63
Javier López	61	2	1	0	3.10	26
Mike Timlin	50	2	1	1	3.42	31
Kyle Snyder	61	2	3	0	3.81	41
Manny Delcarmen	44	0	0	1	2.05	41
Joel Piñeiro	31	1	1	0	5.03	20
Brendan Donnelly	27	2	1	0	3.05	15
J. C. Romero	23	1	0	1	3.15	11
Éric Gagné	20	2	2	0	6.75	22
Bryan Corey	9	1	0	0	1.93	6

== Post-season ==
2007 Post-season game log
American League Division Series

#	Date	Opponent	Score	Win	Loss	Save	Attendance	Record
1	October 3	Angels	4–0	Beckett (1–0)	Lackey (0–1)		37,597	1–0
2	October 5	Angels	6–3	Papelbon (1–0)	Speier (0–1)		37,706	2–0
3	October 7	@Angels	9–1	Schilling (1–0)	Weaver (0–1)		45,262	3–0

American League Championship Series

#	Date	Opponent	Score	Win	Loss	Save	Attendance	Record
1	October 12	Indians	10–3	Beckett (2–0)	Sabathia (1–1)		36,986	1–0 (4–0)
2	October 13	Indians	13–6 (11)	Mastny (1–0)	Gagne (0–1)		37,051	1–1 (4–1)
3	October 15	@ Indians	4–2	Westbrook (1–1)	Matsuzaka (1–1)	Borowski (2)	44,402	1–2 (4–2)
4	October 16	@ Indians	7–3	Byrd (1–0)	Wakefield (0–1)		44,008	1–3 (4–3)
5	October 18	@ Indians	7–1	Beckett (3–0)	Sabathia (1–2)		44,588	2–3 (5–3)
6	October 20	Indians	12–2	Schilling (2–0)	Carmona (0–1)		37,163	3–3 (6–3)
7	October 21	Indians	11–2	Matsuzaka (2–1)	Westbrook (1–2)	Papelbon (1)	37,165	4–3 (7–3)

World Series

#	Date	Opponent	Score	Win	Loss	Save	Attendance	Record
1	October 24	Rockies	13–1	Beckett (1–0)	Francis (0–1)		36,733	1–0 (8–3)
2	October 25	Rockies	2–1	Schilling (1–0)	Jiménez (0–1)	Papelbon (1)	36,730	2–0 (9–3)
3	October 27	@ Rockies	10–5	Matsuzaka (1–0)	Fogg (0–1)	Papelbon (2)	49,983	3–0 (10–3)
4	October 28	@ Rockies	4–3	Lester (1–0)	Cook (0–1)	Papelbon (3)	50,041	4–0 (11–3)

=== Division Series ===
The Red Sox not only won the AL East Division for the first time in 12 years, but clinched the best record in the American League—and all of baseball. While their 96–66 record was the same as that of the Cleveland Indians, the Red Sox held the season series tiebreaker for American League home-field advantage, having bested the Tribe 5 games to 2. Thus, the wild card New York Yankees were sent to Cleveland while the Sox would host the Los Angeles Angels of Anaheim.

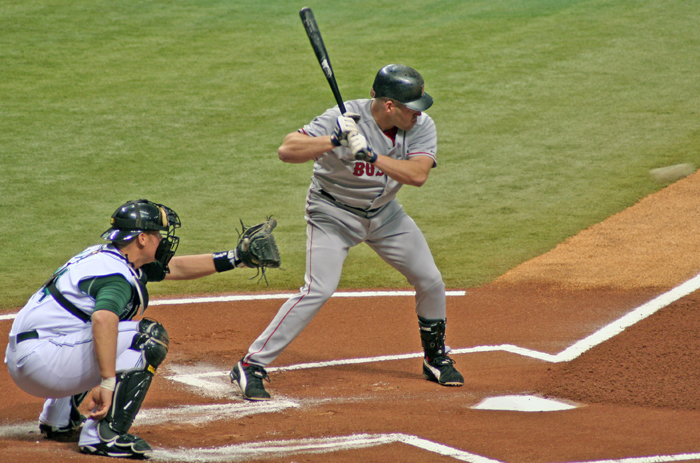
All Star Kevin Youkilis

Josh Beckett started the series with a complete-game shutout in Game 1, resuming his dominance of the postseason after a three-season absence. Although Kevin Youkilis hit a solo home run in the first inning that would prove to be all the offense Beckett needed, David Ortiz provided additional support with a two-run homer in the third to cap off a 4–0 Game 1 victory. Game 2 was much closer, with Daisuke Matsuzaka and Kelvim Escobar each surrendering three runs by the time the fifth inning was done. In the bottom of the ninth, after a Julio Lugo single and David Ortiz's playoff record-tying fourth walk of the night (this time, intentional), Manny Ramírez ended the game with a towering home run that left Fenway Park over the Green Monster. With a 6–3 Game 2 win, the Red Sox would go to Angel Stadium of Anaheim with a 2–0 series lead.

In Game 3, Curt Schilling brought back the dominant pitching, scattering six hits and striking out four in seven innings of shutout work. He had plenty of run support as well, with Ortiz and Ramírez hitting back-to-back solo home runs in the fourth, and a progression of hits that scored seven more in the eighth inning. Éric Gagné gave up the only run, giving up a ground-rule double to Maicer Izturis in the bottom of the ninth, then advancing Izturis to third on a wild pitch before giving up a sacrifice fly to Howie Kendrick that scored Izturis. After that, a strikeout and a flyout ended the game with a 9–1 Red Sox victory to clinch a series sweep.

The Red Sox sweep was one of three Division Series sweeps in the 2007 post-season. Only one series would go more than three—the Indians beat the Yankees in four games.

=== League Championship Series ===
In Game 1, Travis Hafner got the first run on Josh Beckett with a solo home run in the first inning. Manny Ramírez answered back, driving in Kevin Youkilis with a single in the bottom of the first. After that, Beckett settled in, while Indians starter C.C. Sabathia fell apart. In the bottom of the third, he gave up a ground-rule double to Julio Lugo, and then after a bunt groundout for Dustin Pedroia, he walked Kevin Youkilis, hit David Ortiz, and walked Manny Ramírez to give up the lead. Then he gave up a double to Mike Lowell that scored Youkilis and Ortiz. After Bobby Kielty was walked, Jason Varitek hit a groundout that could not be turned into a double-play, scoring Ramírez. The Sox tacked five more on, and win Game 1, 10–3.

Game 2 was a slugfest, with Curt Schilling and Fausto Carmona both failing to make it out of the fifth inning, and a 6–6 tie after six innings. The game drew into extra frames, but the Red Sox bullpen got hammered in the top of the eleventh, with Éric Gagné, Javier López and Jon Lester giving up seven runs. The Red Sox failed to answer back, and lost Game 2, 13–6. The series was even headed to Cleveland.

In Game 3, Daisuke Matsuzaka gave up 4 runs, and Jason Varitek provided the only Red Sox offense with a two-run homer in the seventh, as the Indians took the Jacobs Field opener, 4–2, for a 2–1 series lead. Game 4 did not start much better for the Red Sox, with a seven-run fifth inning that saw Manny Delcarmen allow four runs (two charged to starter Tim Wakefield). In the top of the sixth, the Sox showed some life with back-to-back-to-back solo home runs by Kevin Youkilis, David Ortiz and Manny Ramírez. That would be all of the Sox offense, as they fell, 7–3, to end up in a 3–1 ALCS hole once again.

Once more, the Red Sox faced ALCS elimination. But one person who was not panicking was Manny Ramírez. In his typical "Manny Being Manny" attitude, Ramirez told reporters that if the Red Sox were eliminated, it wouldn't be "the end of the world." His comments seemed laissez faire at the time, as many members of the Boston media chose to interpret them as meaning that Manny would not put forth his best effort in the games to come and would thus disrupt his team's ability to compete. Fate proved them wrong though. With Josh Beckett on the mound again for Game 5, the Red Sox dominated, with Kevin Youkilis driving in three and David Ortiz driving in two to power a 7–1 Red Sox victory to force the ALCS back to Fenway Park.

The Red Sox were hardly finished. In Game 6, Curt Schilling redeemed himself, giving up two runs in seven innings, while J. D. Drew hammered a grand slam in the first inning, and the Sox tacked on six more in the third, leading to a 12–2 victory. Éric Gagné finished the game by pitching a perfect 9th inning. Game 7 gave Daisuke Matsuzaka his chance at redemption, and he did not disappoint, giving up 2 runs in five innings, while Hideki Okajima and Jonathan Papelbon each pitched two scoreless innings. The Sox hammered out a run in each of the first three innings, then exploded with a Dustin Pedroia two-run homer in the seventh, and six more runs—including another two-run homer by Kevin Youkilis—in the eighth. With an 11–2 Game 7 victory, the Red Sox came back once again from elimination, bringing them to their second World Series in four years.

=== 2007 World Series ===
At first, the World Series seemed like a tough task. After going the distance with the Indians, the Red Sox had to face the red-hot Colorado Rockies, who had just finished a 21-of-22 run that included forcing and winning a Wild Card one-game playoff with the San Diego Padres, then sweeping the Philadelphia Phillies in the NLDS and the Arizona Diamondbacks in the NLCS. The Red Sox were counting on their historically dominant postseason pitching and the possibility that eight days off would leave the Rox rusty.

Game 1 proved, once more, to be a domination. Josh Beckett gave up just one run in seven innings of work while striking out nine, while Rockies starter Jeff Francis gave up a home run on his second pitch to Dustin Pedroia in the bottom of the first, and a total of six runs in four innings. It got worse from there, as the Red Sox hammered reliever Franklin Morales for seven runs in the fifth inning. The Red Sox took Game 1, 13–1.

In Game 2, Curt Schilling gave up one run in 5 1/3 innings, and Hideki Okajima and Jonathan Papelbon finished the game flawlessly. This time, the dominance was necessary, as the Red Sox scored two times, with Jason Varitek driving in Mike Lowell in the fourth, then Lowell driving in David Ortiz in the fifth for their only offense of the game. With a 2–1 Game 2 win, the Red Sox went to Coors Field in Denver with the advantage, hoping the rarefied air would not affect them too much.

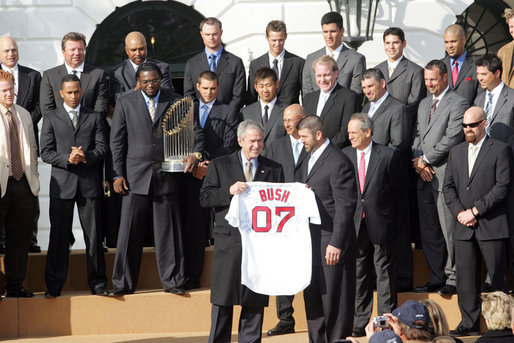
Victorious Red Sox players being honored at the White House by President George W. Bush

Game 3 began with another dominating offensive performance. Boston struck first, with six runs in the third inning that knocked out Rox starter Josh Fogg. Mike Lowell and pitcher Daisuke Matsuzaka each had two RBIs, and Manny Ramírez was called out at home on a controversial, but ultimately correct, tagout call. The Rockies tried to come back, bringing in five runs, including a Matt Holliday home run. But the Sox put it away, with rookies Dustin Pedroia and Jacoby Ellsbury combining to drive in three in the eighth inning, and Mike Lowell scoring the final Sox run in the ninth to seal a 10–5 win that put the Red Sox one game away from their second World Series Championship in four years.

Game 4 gave Jon Lester his shot at redemption, as a back injury to Tim Wakefield gave Lester the start. He was scoreless in 5 2/3 innings, with Mike Lowell scoring two runs and Jacoby Ellsbury scoring one in support. In the eighth inning, Bobby Kielty hit a pinch-hit home run to put an end to the Sox's scoring. Hideki Okajima almost gave the game up, allowing two runs in the eighth before Jonathan Papelbon came in to save the game in 1 2/3 innings. The Red Sox celebrated a 4–3 win and a four-game World Series sweep at Coors Field. Mike Lowell, with his .400 average and six runs scored, was named the MVP of the World Series.

Two days later, on October 30, the Red Sox were the guests of honor in a Rolling Rally through Boston, after which the team began to lay their plans for the 2008 season.

== Red Sox rookies ==
During the course of the 2007 season, the Red Sox were helped out and sometimes carried by rookies. Five rookies stick out in particular. Dustin Pedroia, Jacoby Ellsbury, Clay Buchholz, Daisuke Matsuzaka, and Hideki Okajima all had their moments and left their mark of this season in Red Sox history.

Dustin Pedroia began the season as the Red Sox starting second baseman. Pedroia, 24, struggled in April only batting .182, with 10 hits in 55 at-bats. Although he struggled in the first month, Pedroia heated up batting an outstanding .415 in the month of May. Pedroia was honored as American League Rookie of the Month for the month of May. Pedroia continued this hot hitting for the remainder of the season. Pedroia also excelled his play in the postseason by 2 HR and driving in 10 runs in 14 games to help the Red Sox win the World Series. Pedroia ended batting .317 which ranked 10th among all American League players. Pedroia also finished with 8 home runs and 50 runs batted in. Pedroia won the American League Rookie of the Year award.

Pedroia was not the only rookie position player to make an impact this season. Jacoby Ellsbury, 24, made his MLB debut on June 30. Instantly Ellsbury succeeded. In only 33 games and 116 at-bats, Ellsbury hit .353, had 3 home runs, and had 41 hits. Jacoby also showed off his versatility by stealing 9 bases without getting caught. Ellsbury also had a terrific postseason. Ellsbury replaced center fielder Coco Crisp in Game 6 of the ALCS against the Indians. He did not heat up until Game 3 of the World Series, where he had 4 hits and 2 doubles. Ellsbury batted an amazing .438 in the 4-game sweep of the Colorado Rockies.

The Boston Red Sox also had one incredible rookie pitcher named Clay Buchholz. Buchholz, 23, made his MLB debut on August 17. In his first start against the Los Angeles Angels of Anaheim at Fenway Park, Buchholz pitched 6 innings, allowing 3 earned runs, while striking out 5 batters. However, it was not until his second Major League start before Clay Buchholz became a household name throughout Red Sox Nation. On September 1 against the Baltimore Orioles at Fenway Park, Buchholz pitched a no-hitter. He struck out 9 Orioles including Oriole right fielder Nick Markakis on a curveball to complete this outstanding feat. Buchholz became the second rookie in Major League history to pitch a no-hitter. Buchholz pitched in 4 games with the Red Sox. He was 3–1 with a 1.59 ERA and 22 strikeouts. Despite his success in the regular season, Buchholz was left off the Red Sox postseason roster due to what Red Sox management determined was a fatigued arm.

== Season milestones ==
The season got off to a wonderful start. On April 22, 2007, in a game against the New York Yankees, the Red Sox hit four consecutive home runs for the first time in franchise history (and the fifth time in major league history), when Manny Ramírez, J. D. Drew, Mike Lowell, and Jason Varitek all hit home runs off Yankees pitcher Chase Wright. Drew also hit the second of four consecutive home runs the last time this happened, when the Los Angeles Dodgers did it against the San Diego Padres on September 18, 2006. That series was also the first series since the 1990 season that the Red Sox swept the Yankees in a three-game series at Fenway.

Six members of the Red Sox were chosen to play in the season's all-star game. David Ortiz was elected to start at first base by the fans, third baseman Mike Lowell and outfielder Manny Ramírez were chosen by their fellow players as reserves. Pitchers Josh Beckett and Jonathan Papelbon made the initial team, and reliever Hideki Okajima was voted in by the fans as the winner of the 32nd-man internet vote. It was the first time the Red Sox had more than two pitchers make the all-star team. Josh Beckett was credited with the win for the American League.

On September 1, 2007, against the Baltimore Orioles, rookie pitcher Clay Buchholz threw a no hitter in his second major league start. He was the first rookie in Red Sox history to throw a no hitter, as well as the 17th pitcher in Red Sox history to throw one. He got nine strikeouts and gave up three walks and hit one batter.

Julio Lugo and Coco Crisp became the first pair of Red Sox players to have at least 25 stolen bases since Tris Speaker and Hal Janvrin in 1914.

Leading the league with a perfect 1.000 fielding percentage, and an AL-record 1,079 errorless chances at first, Kevin Youkilis won the 2007 AL Gold Glove award for first basemen.

== Awards and honors ==
- Jacoby Ellsbury – AL Rookie of the Month (September)
- Hideki Okajima – AL Rookie of the Month (April)
- David Ortiz – Silver Slugger Award (DH), AL Player of the Month (September)
- Dustin Pedroia – American League Rookie of the Year, AL Rookie of the Month (May)
- Kevin Youkilis – Gold Glove Award (1B)

All-Star Game

- Josh Beckett, reserve P
- Mike Lowell, reserve 3B
- Hideki Okajima, reserve P (final vote winner)
- David Ortiz, starting 1B
- Jonathan Papelbon, reserve P
- Manny Ramírez, reserve OF

== Farm system ==
The Class A-Advanced affiliate changed from the Wilmington Blue Rocks to the Lancaster JetHawks.

Level	Team	League	Manager
AAA	Pawtucket Red Sox	International League	Ron Johnson
AA	Portland Sea Dogs	Eastern League	Arnie Beyeler
A-Advanced	Lancaster JetHawks	California League	Chad Epperson
A	Greenville Drive	South Atlantic League	Gabe Kapler
A-Short Season	Lowell Spinners	New York–Penn League	Gary DiSarcina
Rookie	GCL Red Sox	Gulf Coast League	Dave Tomlin
Rookie	DSL Red Sox	Dominican Summer League	José Zapata
