= Accardo =

Accardo is an Italian surname. Notable people with the surname include:

- Jeremy Accardo (born 1981), American bullpen coach and former baseball player
- Salvatore Accardo (born 1941), Italian violin virtuoso and conductor
- Tony Accardo (1906–1992), Italian-American mobster
