= B. J. Ryan =

American baseball player and coach (born 1975)

B.J. Ryan
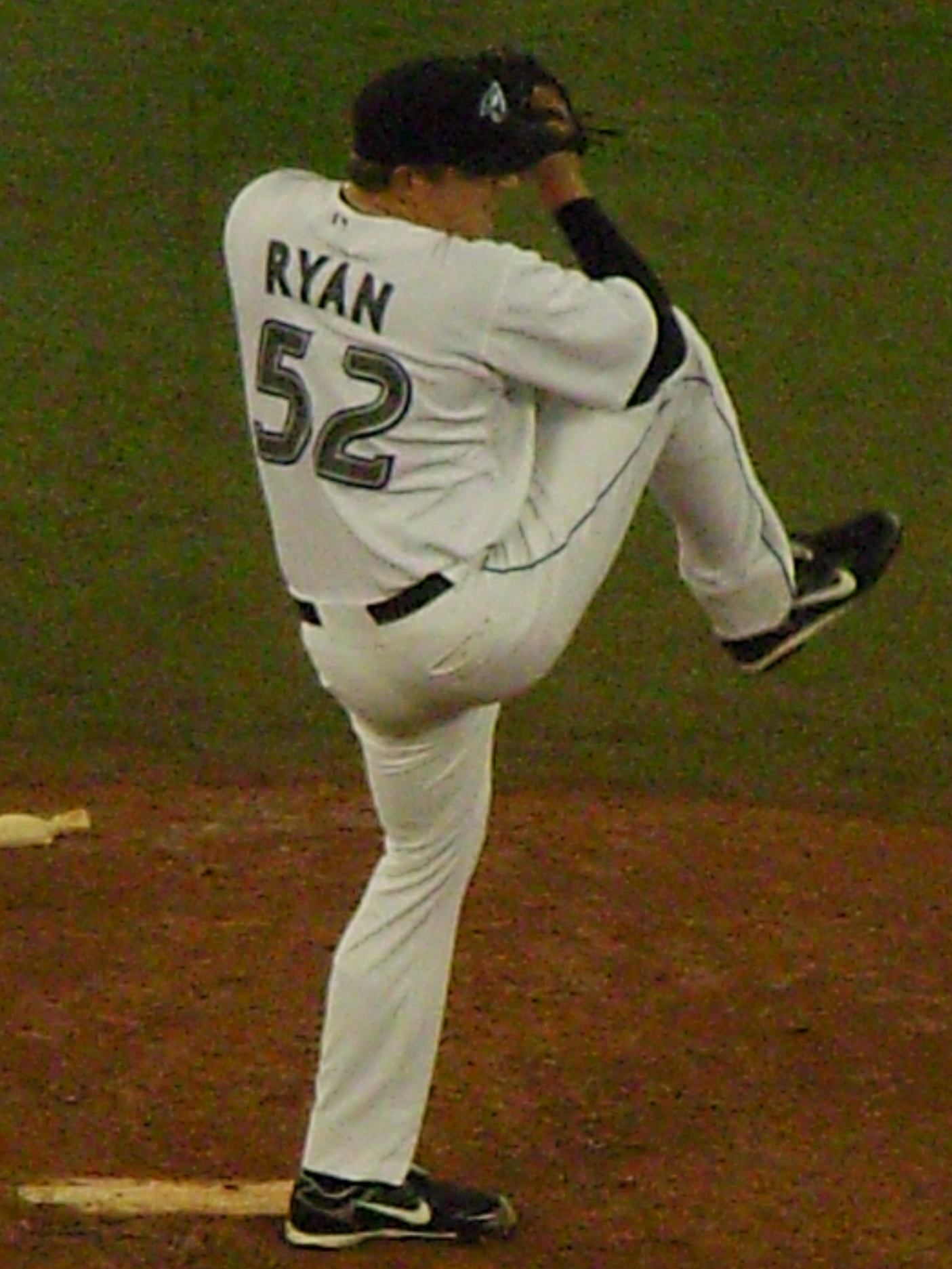
- Ryan with the Toronto Blue Jays in 2008
- Pitcher
- Born: December 28, 1975 (age 49); Bossier City, Louisiana, U.S.
- Batted: Left Threw: Left

MLB debut
- July 29, 1999, for the Cincinnati Reds

Last MLB appearance
- July 5, 2009, for the Toronto Blue Jays

MLB statistics
- Win–loss record: 21–28
- Earned run average: 3.37
- Strikeouts: 625
- Saves: 117
- Stats at Baseball Reference

Teams
- Cincinnati Reds (1999); Baltimore Orioles (1999–2005); Toronto Blue Jays (2006–2009)

Career highlights and awards
- 2× All-Star (2005, 2006)

Robert Victor "B. J." Ryan Jr. (born December 28, 1975) is an American baseball coach and former relief pitcher. He played college baseball at Louisiana, where he played for coach Tony Robichaux in 1997 and 1998. He played in Major League Baseball (MLB) from 1999 to 2009 for the Cincinnati Reds, Baltimore Orioles, and Toronto Blue Jays.

== Amateur career ==
Ryan attended Airline High School in Bossier City, Louisiana, where he played for the school's baseball team. After going unselected in the Major League Baseball (MLB) draft out of high school, Ryan enrolled at the Centenary College of Louisiana and played for the Gentlemen. He was a two-way player while at Centenary. Ryan threw three complete games as a true freshman for the Gentlemen. As a sophomore pitcher, Ryan threw seven complete games while racking up 100.2 innings pitched for the season. As a hitter, he had 209 at bats.

When Ryan decided to transfer to the University of Louisiana at Lafayette in the fall of 1996, the team used him as a relief pitcher, filling the role of their spot starter, in addition to playing outfield and first base. He quickly became one of UL Lafayette's best hitters, so the team moved Ryan into their starting first base position midway through the season.

As a senior in 1998, he made two starts for the Ragin' Cajuns, pitching to a 6–1 win–loss record with a 2.28 earned run average, while earning six saves. Additionally, he made 51 starts at first base, hitting at .370 batting average with 11 home runs and 36 RBI. At the conclusion of the regular season, Ryan was named Second Team All-Sun Belt Conference. He was also named the Most Outstanding Player of the 1998 Sun Belt Conference Baseball Tournament.

== Professional career ==
=== Cincinnati Reds ===
The Cincinnati Reds selected Ryan in the 17th round as a pitcher, with the 500th overall selection, of the 1998 MLB draft. The Reds assigned Ryan to the Billings Mustangs of the rookie-level Pioneer League, where he made 14 appearances before he was promoted to the Charleston Alley Cats of the Low-A South Atlantic League. He earned yet another promotion before the season ended to the Chattanooga Lookouts of the Southern League finishing the year with a 2.06 ERA in 33 games with 10 saves. In 1999, he began the season with Chattanooga, but was promoted to the Indianapolis Indians of the Triple-A International League.

The Reds added Ryan to their 40-man roster on July 28, 1999, to use him in the bullpen. He made his major league debut that same day, logging two innings, walking one and giving up four hits.

=== Baltimore Orioles ===
On July 31, 1999, Ryan was traded to the Baltimore Orioles with Jacobo Sequea for Juan Guzmán and cash. Ryan started his career as a left-handed specialist. His inability to command his pitches, combined with a history of difficulty facing right-handed batters, prevented him from acquiring a larger role in the bullpen. However, his eccentric, three-quarter, slingshot-like delivery made him a dominant force against left-handed batters.

On May 1, 2003, Ryan logged an unusual accomplishment: he won a game without throwing a pitch. Ryan's first throw was to first base where he picked off the Detroit Tigers' Omar Infante to end the inning. The Orioles took the lead in the next half-inning and Ryan was relieved to begin the half-inning after that.

During his prime, Ryan was able to not only control his pitches, but also add tailing movement to his low-90s fastball. This movement, combined with his devastating slider, helped his success rate against right-handed batters. During his years with Baltimore, he translated this success into a larger role in the Orioles' bullpen. By the middle of 2004, he secured the primary setup role. By the end of the year, he took Jorge Julio's job as the closer.

In 2005, Ryan had a spectacular season as closer for Baltimore, going 1–4 with a 2.43 ERA while converting 36 of 41 save opportunities in 69 relief appearances. He was also named to the All-Star Game for the first time in his career.

=== Toronto Blue Jays ===
Ryan became one of the most coveted free agents in Major League Baseball during the 2005 off-season. After considering an offer to rejoin the Orioles, as well as visiting with other potential suitors such as the Cleveland Indians and New York Yankees, Ryan signed a five-year, $47 million contract with the Toronto Blue Jays on November 28, 2005. At the time, that was the largest contract for a reliever in Major League Baseball history, surpassing Mariano Rivera's four-year, $40 million deal with the Yankees from 2001 to 2004.

On July 3, 2006, it was announced that Ryan would make his second All-Star Game appearance when he was one of five Toronto Blue Jays players selected for the American League All-Star Team. During the 2006 All-Star Game held on July 10 in Pittsburgh, Pennsylvania, Ryan pitched the scoreless eighth inning and earned the win for the American League. He finished the year with a career-high 38 saves, ranking third in the league behind Francisco Rodriguez of the Los Angeles Angels of Anaheim and Bobby Jenks of the Chicago White Sox. Ryan also finished with a career-low 1.37 ERA in 65 games.

On May 10, 2007, the Blue Jays announced that Ryan underwent Tommy John surgery in his left elbow and would be out for the remainder of the 2007 season. Ryan's place in the bullpen was taken by Jeremy Accardo and Casey Janssen, with Accardo making the league minimum salary.

On April 13, 2008, less than one year removed from Tommy John surgery, Ryan was activated from the disabled list. Later that afternoon, he entered the game in the 10th inning, and picked up his first save in over one year.

Despite his arm not being fully healed and his slider's reduced effectiveness, he still managed to save an impressive 32 games for the Jays, placing sixth in the American League. He was also nominated for the DHL Delivery Man of the Year Award. From his return to around a month later, he had an average ERA under 1.00.

Despite eight years of solid health, some have criticized Ryan's mechanics as making him significantly more susceptible to injury.

Ryan got off to slow start to the 2009 season due to his significant drop in velocity, which limited his effectiveness. On April 23, Ryan was placed on the 15-day DL with problems in his throwing shoulder, more specifically a strained trapezius muscle. When he was activated from the DL, he was used as a middle reliever. The closing job went to Scott Downs.

On July 8, 2009, Ryan was released by the Blue Jays. At the time of his release, the Blue Jays were still responsible for the roughly $5 million remaining on his contract for the remainder of 2009, as well as the $10 million he was owed for 2010. Blue Jays general manager J.P. Ricciardi was widely criticized for the Ryan contract.

=== Chicago Cubs ===
On July 16, 2009, eight days after being released by the Blue Jays, the Chicago Cubs came to an agreement with Ryan. After working out at the Cubs' Arizona Spring Training facility, he was assigned to their Triple-A affiliate, the Iowa Cubs. He felt that his velocity would not get any higher, so he asked for his unconditional release, which was granted on August 5.

== Personal ==
Ryan's entrance music was "Duality" by Slipknot.

== Coaching career ==
On July 24, 2019, Ryan was named the pitching coach at the University of Louisiana at Lafayette where he stayed for three seasons until 2022.
