= Lee Gronkiewicz =

American baseball player (born 1978)

- Relief pitcher
- Born: August 21, 1978 (age 47); Los Angeles, California
- Batted: Right Threw: Right

MLB debut
- June 19, 2007, for the Toronto Blue Jays

Last MLB appearance
- June 19, 2007, for the Toronto Blue Jays

MLB statistics
- Win–loss record: 0–0
- Earned run average: 2.25
- Strikeouts: 2
- Stats at Baseball Reference

Teams
- Toronto Blue Jays (2007)
Medals
Men's baseball
Representing United States
Baseball World Cup
Gold medal – first place	2007 Tianmu	National team

Lee Matthew Gronkiewicz (born August 21, 1978) is an American former Major League Baseball relief pitcher who played for the Toronto Blue Jays in 2007. He is the previous head coach of the Columbia Blowfish and is also involved with USA baseball on the college national team selection committee.

== College career ==
A native of Los Angeles, California, Gronkiewicz attended Lancaster High School in South Carolina. He started his college baseball career at Spartanburg Methodist College, and then transferred to the University of South Carolina. In 1999, he played collegiate summer baseball with the Falmouth Commodores of the Cape Cod Baseball League. In 2001, he set a school record in saves and was selected to the All-SEC team and was a First-team All-American. He led the country in saves that year and had a 1.42 earned run average.

== Minor league career ==
Gronkiewicz signed with the Cleveland Indians in 2001 as an amateur free agent. In 2003, he was recognized as the best relief pitcher in the minor leagues and given the minor leagues' Rolaids Relief Award. He spent four years in Cleveland's minor league system before he was acquired by the Toronto Blue Jays in the 2004 Rule 5 draft. In seven minor-league seasons, Gronkiewicz has a career 18–16 record, pitching almost entirely in relief with just one start for the 2007 Syracuse Sky Chiefs, putting up a 2.48 ERA and a 1.16 WHIP along the way. He struck out nearly four times as many batters as he walked (421 strikeouts and 111 walks through 2007).

== Major league career ==
Gronkiewicz' major league debut (and only major league appearance to date) was on June 19, 2007, when the Blue Jays hosted the Los Angeles Dodgers. He allowed one run—a home run to Dodgers catcher Russell Martin—on two hits, walking two and striking out two, over four innings of work. He was on the Major League roster for about a week before being demoted.

In November 2007, he signed as a free agent with the Boston Red Sox.

In April 2008, after a stellar month in Triple-A where he allowed 1 run in 11 innings, he was placed on the DL with elbow soreness. It was later determined to be damage to his UCL and he underwent Tommy John surgery, ending his season. He became a free agent at the end of the season.

== See also ==
- Rule 5 draft results
