= Jeremy Accardo =

American baseball player (born 1981)

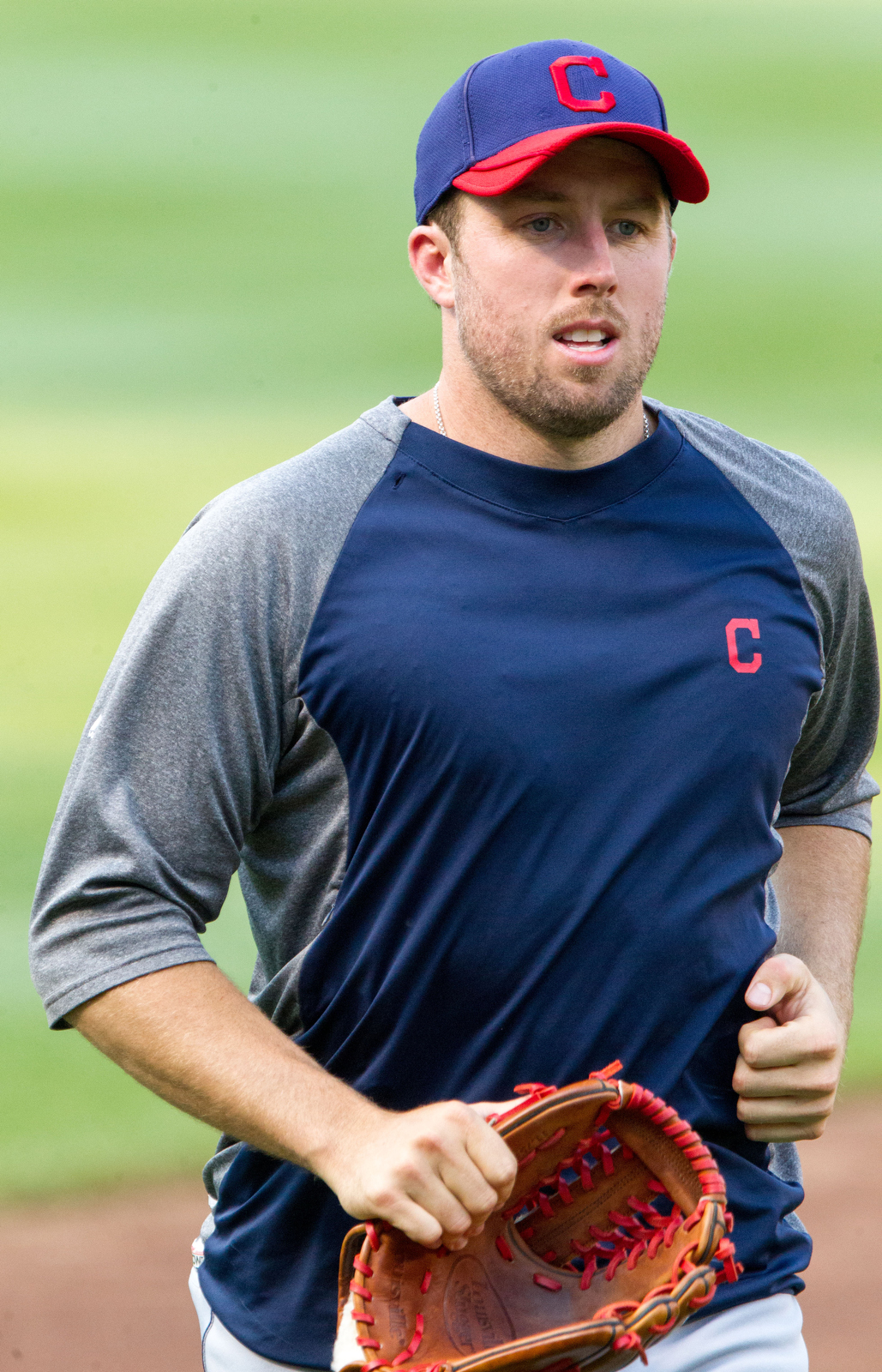
- Accardo with the Cleveland Indians
- Pitcher
- Born: December 8, 1981 (age 44); Phoenix, Arizona, U.S.
- Batted: Right Threw: Right

MLB debut
- May 4, 2005, for the San Francisco Giants

Last MLB appearance
- September 27, 2012, for the Oakland Athletics

MLB statistics
- Win–loss record: 10–20
- Earned run average: 4.30
- Strikeouts: 205
- Stats at Baseball Reference

Teams
- San Francisco Giants (2005–2006); Toronto Blue Jays (2006–2010); Baltimore Orioles (2011); Cleveland Indians (2012); Oakland Athletics (2012)

Jeremiah Lee Accardo (born December 8, 1981) is an American former professional baseball pitcher and coach. He played in Major League Baseball (MLB) for the San Francisco Giants, Toronto Blue Jays, Baltimore Orioles, Cleveland Indians, and Oakland Athletics. He later was the assistant pitching coach for the New York Mets of MLB before joining the Milwaukee Brewers' minor league organization as a coach. Prior to playing professionally, Accardo attended Mesa High School and later Illinois State University.

== Professional career ==
=== San Francisco Giants ===
Accardo signed as an undrafted free agent by the San Francisco Giants of the National League in 2003 after attending Illinois State University.

He made his major league debut on May 4, 2005, pitching one perfect inning in relief against the Arizona Diamondbacks. He finished the 2005 season with a 3.94 ERA, 1.19 WHIP, nine walks and 16 strikeouts in 29 2/3 innings of work. In 2006, Accardo was briefly the team's closer when Armando Benítez suffered an ankle injury.

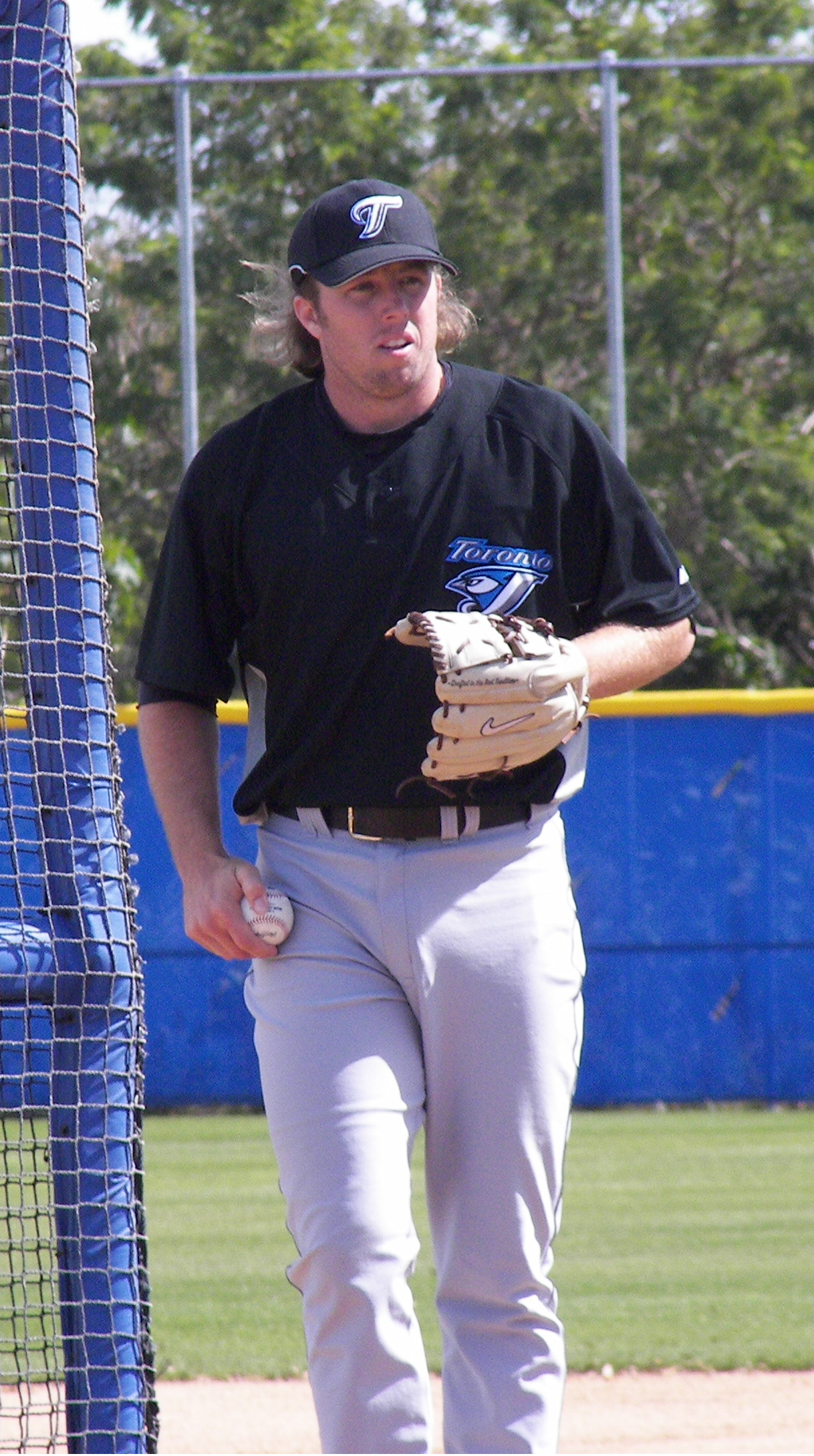
Accardo with the Toronto Blue Jays in 2007

=== Toronto Blue Jays ===
On July 21, 2006, Accardo was traded to the Toronto Blue Jays for third baseman Shea Hillenbrand and relief pitcher Vinnie Chulk, where he finished the season. In 2006, he posted a combined 5.35 ERA, 1.39 WHIP, 20 walks and 54 strikeouts in 69 innings of work.

In 2007, Accardo took the role of closer from Jason Frasor, who had only become the closer due to an elbow injury sustained by B. J. Ryan. He began the season posting 21 consecutive scoreless innings until allowing three runs on May 26, 2007, in a game against the Minnesota Twins. On September 28, he recorded his 30th save of the year.

Accardo missed much of the 2008 season because of injury. He had a good spring training in 2009 but did not make the Toronto Blue Jays 25-man roster out of camp. He started the season at Triple A with the Las Vegas 51s. On June 18, his contract was purchased by Toronto to replace the injured Scott Downs. At the time, the Blue Jays' pitching staff continued to be hit by a string of injuries. He made his first 2009 major league appearance that day against the Philadelphia Phillies in an 8–7 victory and earned the save. After making 31 appearances for the Jays over 2009–2010, Toronto did not tender a contract to Accardo prior to the 2010 non-tender deadline, thereby making him a free agent.

=== Baltimore Orioles ===
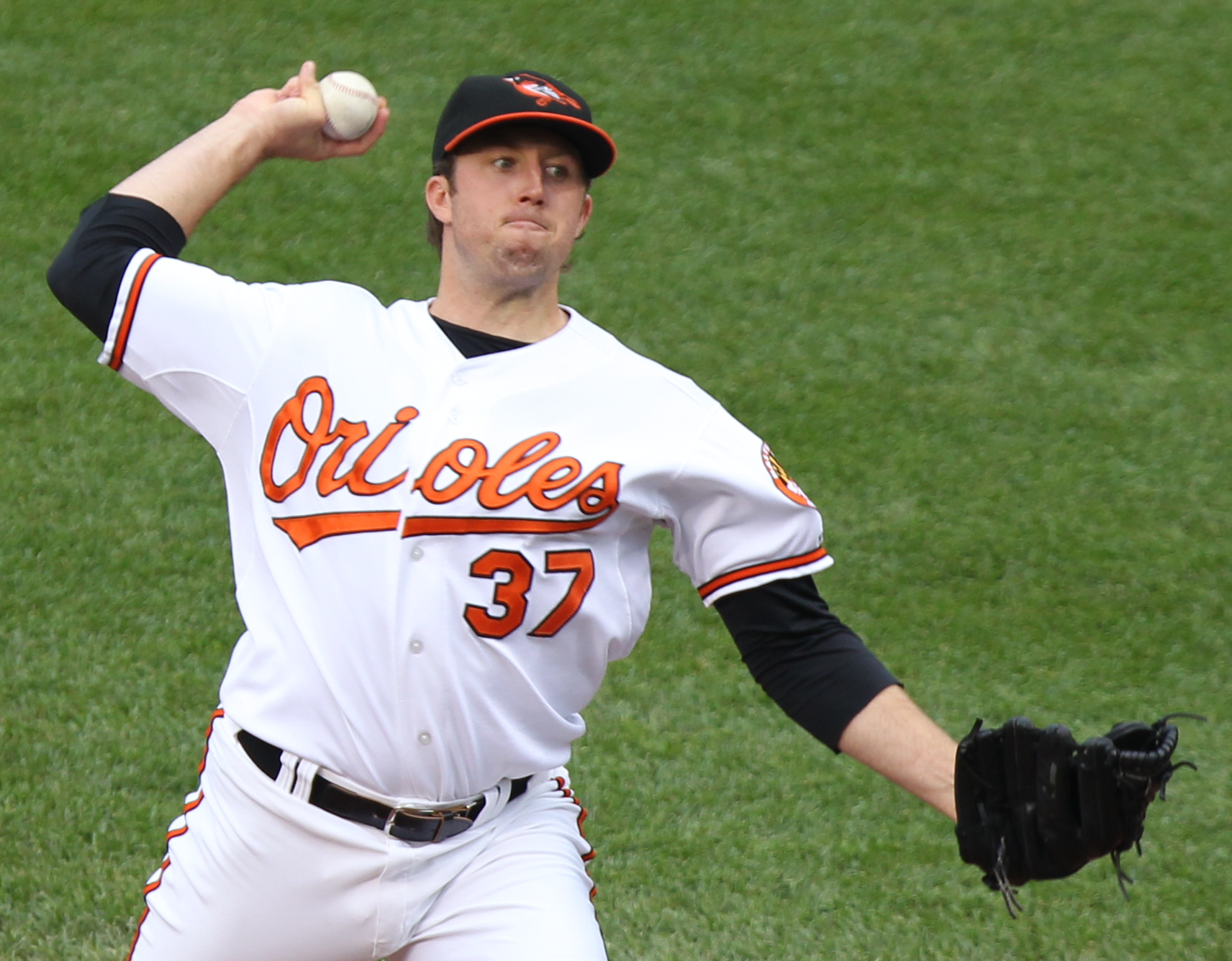
Accardo pitching for the Baltimore Orioles in 2011

On December 14, 2010, Accardo signed a one-year deal worth $1.08 million with the Baltimore Orioles. On June 18, 2011, Accardo was designated for assignment. He finished the season with a 5.73 ERA and 1.62 WHIP in 31 appearances, and elected free agency on October 11.

=== Cleveland Indians ===
Accardo signed a minor-league contract with the Cleveland Indians on January 19, 2012. He was invited to the Indians' spring training camp, but did not make the Opening Day roster. His contract was purchased by the Indians' on May 14, 2012. Accardo was designated for assignment on August 5, 2012, to make room on the roster for Chris Seddon and was released on August 9.

=== Oakland Athletics ===
On August 15, 2012, he signed a minor league contract with the Oakland Athletics and was assigned to the Triple-A Sacramento River Cats. On September 23, the Athletics selected his contract from Sacramento, and he made his final major league appearance to date, allowing two runs in two innings against the Texas Rangers on September 27.

On October 18, 2012, the Athletics announced that Accardo had cleared waivers and elected free agency rather than accept an outright assignment to Triple-A.

=== Later playing career ===
On February 5, 2013, Accardo signed a minor league contract with the Washington Nationals. He was released on June 26, 2013, after struggling at Triple-A Syracuse, where he posted a 5.16 ERA in 22 2/3 innings.

Accardo began the 2014 season pitching for the Long Island Ducks of the Atlantic League of Professional Baseball before being released. He later signed with the Bridgeport Bluefish to finish out the season, posting a combined 4.40 ERA and 1.52 WHIP in 60 appearances.

On February 26, 2015, Accardo signed a minor league contract with the Arizona Diamondbacks. He was released on March 30.

=== Coaching career ===
Accardo was the pitching coach for the Gulf Coast Mets in 2017. He served as the bullpen coach for the Las Vegas 51s in 2018. Accardo served as the Mets minor league pitching coordinator in 2019, and as a pitching strategist on the major league staff starting in June 2019. From 2020 to 2021, he was the Mets' assistant pitching coach. Accardo was hired by the Milwaukee Brewers to serve as the pitching coach for their Triple-A affiliate, the Nashville Sounds, in 2022.

On June 27, 2024, it was announced that Accardo would join the Arizona State Sun Devils Baseball program as the team's pitching coach.

== Pitching style ==
Accardo has four pitches. He leads with a four-seam fastball at 90–92 mph and his main off-speed pitch is a splitter from 84 to 86 mph. He also features a two-seam fastball (90–92) and a cutter (89–91). Right-handed hitters see his full repertoire, but he does not throw the cutter to left-handed hitters. Accardo relies heavily on the splitter with two strikes.

== Personal life ==
Accardo's daughter, Leighton, was diagnosed with germ cell cancer in 2019. She died on November 24, 2020, at the age of nine.
