= Al Reyes =

Dominican baseball player (born 1970)

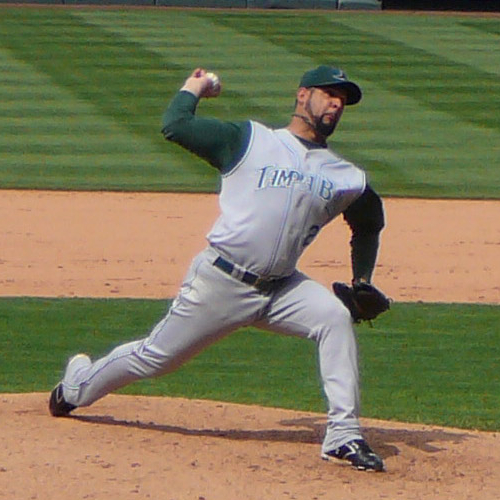
- Reyes with the Tampa Bay Devil Rays
- Pitcher
- Born: April 10, 1970 (age 55); San Cristóbal, Dominican Republic
- Batted: Right Threw: Right

MLB debut
- April 27, 1995, for the Milwaukee Brewers

Last MLB appearance
- August 5, 2008, for the Tampa Bay Rays

MLB statistics
- Win–loss record: 23–16
- Earned run average: 3.82
- Strikeouts: 422
- Stats at Baseball Reference

Teams
- Milwaukee Brewers (1995–1999); Baltimore Orioles (1999–2000); Los Angeles Dodgers (2000–2001); Pittsburgh Pirates (2002); New York Yankees (2003); St. Louis Cardinals (2004–2005); Tampa Bay Devil Rays / Rays (2007–2008)

Rafael Alberto "Al" Reyes (born April 10, 1970) is a Dominican former Major League Baseball pitcher. A right-handed pitcher and career reliever, he played for seven teams; debuting on April 27, 1995, with the Milwaukee Brewers and playing for the Baltimore Orioles, Los Angeles Dodgers, Pittsburgh Pirates, New York Yankees, St. Louis Cardinals, and Tampa Bay Devil Rays/Rays, over the years.

== Career ==
Reyes was originally drafted by the Montreal Expos in 1988. He was 2–0 with a 4.25 earned run average (ERA) and a .206 opponents batting average in 26 games with the Brewers in 1999 until he was sent to the Orioles on July 21 of that year to complete a transaction from five days prior on July 16 when Rocky Coppinger was sent to Milwaukee.

He missed the Cardinals 2005 playoff run after tearing a ligament in his right elbow, and required reconstructive surgery.

In 2006, he signed with the Tampa Bay Devil Rays and was placed on the Durham Bulls minor league roster, but did not play a game that season while recovering from Tommy John surgery. On December 22, 2006, he re-signed with the Tampa Bay Devil Rays, where he became their closer. Reyes finished the 2007 year with 26 saves in 30 chances. Notably, his only blown saves came against the Arizona Diamondbacks and the Boston Red Sox.

On April 10, 2008, Reyes got into a fight at a bar in South Tampa and was tasered twice by a police officer. This had little effect on his ability to throw, as the very next night he got the win for the Rays against the Orioles.

Reyes was designated for assignment on August 9, 2008, and became a free agent on August 18 after refusing an assignment to the minors. He signed a minor league contract with the New York Mets two days later, and was called up to the team when rosters expanded in September. He was released on September 18, 2008, without making any appearances.
