= Scott Downs =

American baseball player (born 1976)

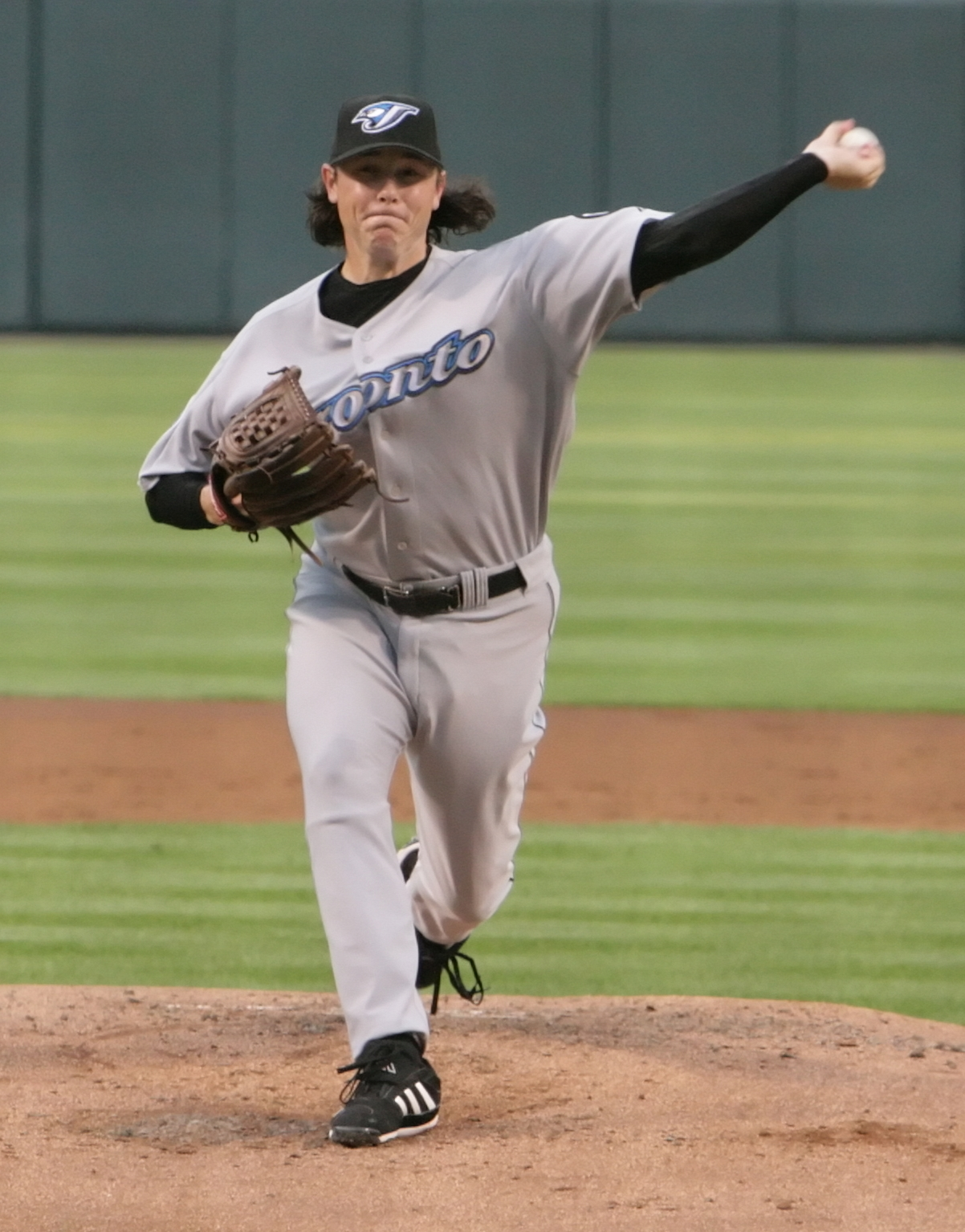
- Downs with the Toronto Blue Jays in 2006
- Pitcher
- Born: March 17, 1976 (age 50); Louisville, Kentucky, U.S.
- Batted: Left Threw: Left

MLB debut
- April 9, 2000, for the Chicago Cubs

Last MLB appearance
- September 23, 2014, for the Kansas City Royals

MLB statistics
- Win–loss record: 38–40
- Earned run average: 3.56
- Strikeouts: 575
- Stats at Baseball Reference

Teams
- Chicago Cubs (2000); Montreal Expos (2000, 2003–2004); Toronto Blue Jays (2005–2010); Los Angeles Angels of Anaheim (2011–2013); Atlanta Braves (2013); Chicago White Sox (2014); Kansas City Royals (2014)

Scott Jeremy Downs (born March 17, 1976) is an American former professional baseball relief pitcher. He played in Major League Baseball (MLB) for the Chicago Cubs, Montreal Expos, Toronto Blue Jays, Los Angeles Angels of Anaheim, Atlanta Braves, and Chicago White Sox. He has been a starter, reliever and closer during his baseball career.

== Amateur career ==
Downs was born and raised in Louisville, Kentucky. He attended Pleasure Ridge Park High School, where he was selected as Kentucky's Mr. Baseball. He was selected by the Atlanta Braves in the 12th round (342nd overall) of the 1994 Major League Baseball draft, but he opted to attend the University of Kentucky instead of signing a professional contract. In 1996, he played collegiate summer baseball in the Cape Cod Baseball League for the Yarmouth-Dennis Red Sox. At the end of his junior season at Kentucky, he was selected by the Chicago Cubs in third round (94th overall) of the 1997 Major League Baseball draft.

== Professional career ==
=== Chicago Cubs ===
Downs made his debut for the Williamsport Cubs of the New York–Penn League, a Low-A affiliate of the Cubs. He made his way through the minor leagues and eventually made the Cubs' roster for opening day 2000. Between the time Downs started in the Cubs' system and when he made the major leagues, he was briefly in the Minnesota Twins system as he was sent by the Cubs to the Twins in November 1998 as a player to be named later from an earlier trade that had brought Mike Morgan back to the Cubs for a second stint. Downs was traded back to the Cubs by the Twins in May 1999 as part of a trade that also saw Rick Aguilera go to Chicago.

Downs made his major league debut for the Chicago Cubs on April 9, 2000. He finished with a 4–3 record and a 5.17 ERA in 18 starts with the Cubs.

=== Montreal Expos ===
At the MLB trading deadline for the 2000 season, July 31, 2000, Downs was traded by the Cubs to the Expos for Rondell White.

On June 11, 2004, while playing for the Edmonton Trappers, the Triple-A affiliate of the Expos, Downs threw a no-hitter against the Las Vegas 51s. It was the first no-hitter by a Trapper since August 8, 1996, when Aaron Small threw one against the Vancouver Canadians.

After struggling in 2004 for the Expos, he was released on November 29.

=== Toronto Blue Jays ===
Downs was signed by the Toronto Blue Jays on December 16, 2004. He split the season between Triple-A and Toronto, posting a 4–3 record with a 4.31 ERA in 26 games (13 starts).

On February 2, 2007, the Blue Jays and Downs agreed to a one-year, $1.025 million contract, avoiding the arbitration process. Downs appeared in 81 games for Toronto in the 2007 season, tying Baltimore's Jamie Walker for the American League lead in that category. Downs went 4–2 with a 2.17 earned run average as a situational reliever, allowing 47 hits in 58 innings.

On January 18, 2008, the Blue Jays signed Downs to a three-year contract worth $10 million.

Downs was scheduled to be the Toronto Blue Jays' primary set up man for the 2009 season. However, when closer B. J. Ryan was sent to the disabled list on April 23, Downs was announced as having taken his place.

On July 8, Ryan was released and Downs was activated from the disabled list. Manager Cito Gaston named Downs the Blue Jays' permanent closer.

=== Los Angeles Angels of Anaheim ===
On December 10, 2010, Downs signed a three-year, $15 million contract with the Los Angeles Angels of Anaheim. He took over the role of closer from struggling reliever Jordan Walden on April 27, 2012.

=== Atlanta Braves ===
On July 29, 2013, Downs was traded to the Atlanta Braves for Cory Rasmus. He made his debut with the team the same day, pitching 1 1/3 scoreless innings and earning a win versus the Colorado Rockies. However, Downs did not make the Braves' NLDS roster.

=== Chicago White Sox ===
On January 2, 2014, the Chicago White Sox announced that they had signed Downs to a one-year, $4 million contract with a club option for 2015. On June 26, the White Sox designated Downs for assignment. The left hander had struggled over 23 2/3 innings pitched, posting a 6.08 ERA. He was released on July 3.

=== Kansas City Royals ===
On July 6, 2014, the Kansas City Royals signed Downs to a one-year contract. He posted a 3.14 ERA in 17 relief appearances with the Royals while posting an 0–2 record.

=== Cleveland Indians ===
On December 20, 2014, the Cleveland Indians announced that Downs had been signed to a minor-league contract, and that he had received an invitation to their spring training camp. He was released on March 30.

=== Pitching style ===
Downs is a two-pitch pitcher. He mainly uses a heavy sinker at about 88–90 mph, and he complements it with a mid-70s curveball, mostly used against left-handed hitters. Prior to 2011, he also threw a slider.

== Personal ==
In 2000, Downs married his college sweetheart Katie Sisler, and lives with her and their children in Lexington, Kentucky.
