= 2007 Oakland Athletics season =

2007 Oakland Athletics
- League: American League
- Division: West
- Ballpark: McAfee Coliseum
- City: Oakland, California
- Record: 76–86 (.469)
- Divisional place: 3rd
- Owners: Lewis Wolff
- General managers: Billy Beane
- Managers: Bob Geren
- Television: FSN Bay Area; KICU (Action 36)
- Radio: KYCY; KNTS; KFRC-FM

The Oakland Athletics' 2007 season was their first since 2004 in which they defended a title. The Athletics were without Frank Thomas (Toronto) and ace Barry Zito (San Francisco), both players who the Athletics lost to free agency. They filled the space left by Frank Thomas by signing free agent catcher Mike Piazza to a one-year contract worth $8.5 million to be the team's designated hitter. They were also without Ken Macha, their former manager who was fired after four seasons with the team and replaced by Bob Geren, as well as third-base coach Ron Washington, who accepted the managerial position of the Texas Rangers. It was their first losing season since 1998.

== Offseason ==
- December 6, 2006: Alan Embree was signed as a free agent with the Oakland Athletics.
- December 7, 2006: Jared Burton was drafted by the Cincinnati Reds from the Oakland Athletics in the 2006 rule 5 draft.
- February 5, 2007: Ricky Ledée signed as a free agent with the Oakland Athletics.

== Regular season ==
=== Season standings ===
AL West
Team	W	L	Pct.	GB	Home	Road
Los Angeles Angels of Anaheim	94	68	.580	—	54‍–‍27	40‍–‍41
Seattle Mariners	88	74	.543	6	49‍–‍33	39‍–‍41
Oakland Athletics	76	86	.469	18	40‍–‍41	36‍–‍45
Texas Rangers	75	87	.463	19	47‍–‍34	28‍–‍53

=== Record vs. opponents ===
2007 American League record Source: MLB Standings Grid – 2007
Team	BAL	BOS	CWS	CLE	DET	KC	LAA	MIN	NYY	OAK	SEA	TB	TEX	TOR	NL
Baltimore	—	6–12	5–3	3–4	1–5	7–0	3–7	0–7	9–9	4–4	2–7	11–7	4–6	8–10	6–12
Boston	12–6	—	7–1	5–2	3–4	3–3	6–4	4–3	8–10	4–4	4–5	13–5	6–4	9–9	12–6
Chicago	3–5	1–7	—	7–11	11–7	12–6	5–4	9–9	4–6	4–5	1–7	6–1	2–4	3–4	4–14
Cleveland	4–3	2–5	11–7	—	12–6	11–7	5–5	14–4	0–6	6–4	4–3	8–2	6–3	4–2	9–9
Detroit	5–1	4–3	7–11	6–12	—	11–7	3–5	12–6	4–4	4–6	6–4	3–4	5–4	4–3	14–4
Kansas City	0–7	3–3	6–12	7–11	7–11	—	5–2	9–9	1–9	6–4	3–6	4–3	5–4	3–4	10–8
Los Angeles	7–3	4–6	4–5	5–5	5–3	2–5	—	6–3	6–3	9–10	13–6	6–2	10–9	3–4	14–4
Minnesota	7–0	3–4	9–9	4–14	6–12	9–9	3–6	—	2–5	5–2	6–3	3–4	7–2	4–6	11–7
New York	9–9	10–8	6–4	6–0	4–4	9–1	3–6	5–2	—	2–4	5–5	10–8	5–1	10–8	10–8
Oakland	4–4	4–4	5–4	4–6	6–4	4–6	10–9	2–5	4–2	—	5–14	4–6	9–10	5–4	10–8
Seattle	7–2	5–4	7–1	3–4	4–6	6–3	6–13	3–6	5–5	14–5	—	4–3	11–8	4–5	9–9
Tampa Bay	7–11	5–13	1–6	2–8	4–3	3–4	2–6	4–3	8–10	6–4	3–4	—	5–4	9–9	7–11
Texas	6–4	4–6	4–2	3–6	4–5	4–5	9–10	2–7	1–5	10–9	8–11	4–5	—	5–5	11–7
Toronto	10–8	9–9	4–3	2–4	3–4	4–3	4–3	6–4	8–10	4–5	5–4	9–9	5–5	—	10–8

=== Roster mike neu ===
2007 Oakland Athletics
Roster
Pitchers: 55 Joe Blanton; 64 Jerry Blevins; 61 Dallas Braden; 54 Andrew Brown; 50 Kiko Calero; 44 Santiago Casilla; 56 Lenny DiNardo; 58 Justin Duchscherer; 41 Alan Embree; 47 Ron Flores; 57 Chad Gaudin; 40 Rich Harden; 15 Dan Haren; 37 Joe Kennedy; 60 Shane Komine; 46 Colby Lewis; 25 Esteban Loaiza; 45 Ruddy Lugo; 52 Jay Marshall; 30 Dan Meyer; 54,61 Erasmo Ramirez; 62 Connor Robertson; 20 Huston Street; 45 Jay Witasick	Catchers: 17 Rob Bowen; 18 Jason Kendall; 17 Adam Melhuse; 28 Kurt Suzuki; Infielders: 10 Daric Barton; 3 Eric Chavez; 7 Bobby Crosby; 14 Mark Ellis; 22 Jack Hannahan; 29 Dan Johnson; 8 Kevin Melillo; 12 Donnie Murphy; 19 Marco Scutaro; 12 Todd Walker	Outfielders: 44 Hiram Bocachica; 22 Milton Bradley; 18 Dee Brown; 6 Travis Buck; 32 Jack Cust; 37 Jeff DaVanon; 8 J. J. Furmaniak; 23 Bobby Kielty; 21 Mark Kotsay; 11 Ryan Langerhans; 26 Danny Putnam; 11 Chris Snelling; 24 Shannon Stewart; 33 Nick Swisher; 51 Kevin Thompson; Other batters: 31 Mike Piazza	Manager: 53 Bob Geren; Coaches: 48 Brad Fischer (bullpen); 4 Rene Lachemann (third base); 38 Bob Schaefer (bench); 39 Ty Van Burkleo (hitting); 36 Tye Waller (first base); 41 Curt Young (pitching)

=== Game log ===
2007 game log
April: 12-13

#	Date	Opponent	Score	Win	Loss	Save	Attendance	Record
1	April 2	@ Mariners	4 – 0	Hernández (1-0)	Haren (0-1)		46,003	0-1
2	April 3	@ Mariners	8 – 4	Mateo (1-0)	Calero (0-1)		25,287	0-2
3	April 4	@ Mariners	9 – 0	Harden (1-0)	Batista (0-1)		22,816	1-2
4	April 5	@ Angels	4 – 3	Duchscherer (1-0)	Rodríguez (0-1)	Street (1)	39,234	2-2
5	April 6	@ Angels	5 – 2	Moseley (1-0)	Kennedy (0-1)	Rodríguez (3)	43,534	2-3
6	April 7	@ Angels	2 – 1	Lackey (2-0)	Haren (0-2)	Shields (1)	44,007	2-4
7	April 8	@ Angels	2 – 1	Blanton (1-0)	Escobar (1-1)	Street (2)	37,783	3-4
8	April 9	White Sox	4 – 1	Contreras (1-1)	Harden (1-1)		35,077	3-5
9	April 10	White Sox	2 – 1	Street (1-0)	Jenks (1-1)		15,153	4-5
10	April 11	White Sox	6 – 3	Aardsma (1-0)	Street (1-1)	Jenks (2)	19,130	4-6
11	April 13	Yankees	5 – 4 (11)	Street (2-1)	Bruney (0-1)		35,077	5-6
12	April 14	Yankees	4 – 3 (13)	Bruney (1-1)	DiNardo (0-1)		35,077	5-7
13	April 15	Yankees	5 – 4	Marshall (1-0)	Rivera (1-1)		35,077	6-7
14	April 17	Angels	4 – 1	Gaudin (1-0)	Weaver (0-1)	Street (3)	20,174	7-7
15	April 18	Angels	3 – 0	Haren (1-2)	Lackey (2-2)	Street (4)	17,322	8-7
16	April 20	@ Rangers	16 – 4	Blanton (2-0)	McCarthy (1-3)		29,782	9-7
17	April 21	@ Rangers	7 – 0	Loe (1-0)	Kennedy (0-2)		42,945	9-8
18	April 22	@ Rangers	4 – 3	Eyre (1-0)	Duchscherer (1-1)	Otsuka (2)	37,002	9-9
19	April 23	@ Orioles	6 – 5	Haren (2-2)	Bédard (3-2)	Street (5)	13,862	10-9
20	April 24	@ Orioles	4 – 2	Braden (1-0)	Guthrie (1-1)	Street (6)	14,452	11-9
21	April 25	Mariners	2 – 0	Washburn (1-2)	Blanton (2-1)		19,674	11-10
22	April 26	Mariners	4 – 2	Batista (2-2)	Calero (0-2)	Putz (2)	14,683	11-11
23	April 27	Devil Rays	4 – 1	Shields (2-0)	Gaudin (1-1)	Reyes (8)	15,388	11-12
24	April 28	Devil Rays	12 – 5	Haren (3-2)	Fossum (2-2)		26,760	12-12
25	April 29	Devil Rays	5 – 3	Kazmir (2-1)	Braden (1-1)	Reyes (9)	23,827	12-13

May: 14-13

#	Date	Opponent	Score	Win	Loss	Save	Attendance	Record
26	May 1	@ Red Sox	5 – 4 (10)	Duchscherer (2-1)	Donnelly (0-1)	Street (7)	37,052	13-13
27	May 2	@ Red Sox	6 – 4	Beckett (6-0)	Marshall (1-1)	Timlin (1)	37,006	13-14
28	May 4	@ Devil Rays	5 – 2	Duchscherer (3-1)	Glover (0-2)	Street (8)	11,546	14-14
29	May 5	@ Devil Rays	3 – 2 (12)	Lugo (2-0)	Marshall (1-2)		16,604	14-15
30	May 6	@ Devil Rays	5 – 3	Blanton (3-1)	Jackson (0-5)	Street (9)	16,880	15-15
31	May 8	@ Royals	6 – 1	Gaudin (2-1)	de la Rosa (3-3)		10,989	16-15
32	May 9	@ Royals	3 – 2	Gobble (1-1)	Duchscherer (3-2)	Soria (6)	10,974	16-16
33	May 10	@ Royals	17 – 3	Kennedy (1-2)	Hudson (0-1)		31,006	17-16
34	May 11	Indians	8 – 2	Blanton (4-1)	Sabathia (5-1)		20,393	18-16
35	May 12	Indians	6 – 3	Carmona (4-1)	Braden (1-2)	Borowski (12)	22,705	18-17
36	May 13	Indians	10 – 7	Witasick (1-0)	Borowski (0-1)		24,692	19-17
37	May 14	Royals	2 – 1	Gobble (2-1)	Duchscherer (3-3)	Soria (7)	12,477	19-18
38	May 15	Royals	5 – 4 (11)	DiNardo (1-1)	Soria (1-2)		14,966	20-18
39	May 16	Royals	4 – 3	Gobble (3-1)	Calero (0-3)	Riske (3)	16,242	20-19
40	May 17	Royals	7 – 4	Elarton (1-0)	Braden (1-3)	Soria (8)	21,037	20-20
41	May 18	Giants	15 – 3	Gaudin (3-1)	Zito (3-5)		35,077	21-20
42	May 19	Giants	4 – 2	Haren (4-2)	Cain (2-4)	Embree (1)	35,077	22-20
43	May 20	Giants	4 – 1	Morris (5-1)	Kennedy (1-3)		35,077	22-21
44	May 21	@ White Sox	8 – 5	Contreras (4-4)	Blanton (4-2)	Jenks (14)	35,327	22-22
45	May 22	@ White Sox	10 – 4	Danks (2-4)	Lewis (0-1)		34,122	22-23
46	May 23	@ White Sox	4 – 0	Gaudin (4-1)	Garland (3-3)			23-23
47	May 25	@ Orioles	3 - 2	Haren (5-2)	Bédard (3-3)	Embree (2)	30,382	24-23
48	May 26	@ Orioles	8 – 3	Burres (2-2)	Kennedy (1-4)		29,194	24-24
49	May 27	@ Orioles	8 – 4	Cabrera (4-5)	Blanton (4-3)		30,140	24-25
50	May 28	Rangers	5 – 3	Gaudin (5-1)	Tejeda (4-5)	Embree (3)	18,230	25-25
51	May 29	Rangers	4 – 0	Wood (1-1)	DiNardo (1-2)	Gagné (3)	18,006	25-26
52	May 30	Rangers	6 – 1	Haren (6-2)	Koronka (0-2)		25,674	26-26

June: 15-13

#	Date	Opponent	Score	Win	Loss	Save	Attendance	Record
53	June 1	Twins	3 – 2 (10)	Neshek (3-0)	Calero (0-4)	Nathan (12)	20,219	26-27
54	June 2	Twins	1 – 0	Blanton (5-3)	Silva (3-6)		30,576	27-27
55	June 3	Twins	4 – 2	Gaudin (6-1)	Santana (6-5)	Embree (4)	25,388	28-27
56	June 4	Red Sox	5 – 4 (11)	Castilla (1-0)	Snyder (1-1)		28,177	29-27
57	June 5	Red Sox	2 – 0	DiNardo (2-2)	Matsuzaka (7-3)	Embree (5)	31,127	30-27
58	June 6	Red Sox	3 – 2	Kennedy (2-4)	Wakefield (5-7)	Casilla (1)	32,280	31-27
59	June 7	Red Sox	1 – 0	Schilling (6-2)	Blanton (5-4)		31,211	31-28
60	June 8	@ Giants	5 – 3 (10)	Calero (1-4)	Hennessey (1-2)	Embree (6)	42,427	32-28
61	June 9	@ Giants	6 – 0	Haren (7-2)	Zito (6-6)		42,526	33-28
62	June 10	@ Giants	2 – 0	Casilla (2-0)	Cain (2-6)		42,345	34-28
63	June 12	@ Astros	5 – 4 (11)	Borkowski (1-0)	Flores (0-1)		33,637	34-29
64	June 13	@ Astros	7 – 3	Blanton (6-4)	Wheeler (0-3)		34,611	35-29
65	June 14	@ Astros	6 – 5 (11)	Embree (1-0)	Moehler (0-2)	Casilla (2)	42,024	36-29
66	June 15	Cardinals	14 – 3	Haren (8-2)	Looper (6-6)		24,241	37-29
67	June 16	Cardinals	15 – 6	Springer (2-0)	DiNardo (2-3)		28,572	37-30
68	June 17	Cardinals	10 – 6	Springer (3-0)	Lewis (0-2)		35,077	37-31
69	June 18	Reds	6 – 1	Blanton (7-4)	Lohse (3-9)		16,466	38-31
70	June 19	Reds	5 – 2	Bailey (2-0)	Gaudin (6-2)	Weathers (14)	19,351	38-32
71	June 20	Reds	5 – 3	Haren (9-2)	McBeth (1-1)	Embree (8)	25,872	39-32
72	June 22	@ Mets	9 – 1	Glavine (6-5)	DiNardo (2-4)		43,029	39-33
73	June 23	@ Mets	1 – 0	Wagner (1-0)	Casilla (2-1)		52,920	39-34
74	June 24	@ Mets	10 – 2	Maine (8-4)	Kennedy (2-5)		50,143	39-35
75	June 25	@ Indians	5 – 2	Sabathia (11-2)	Gaudin (6-3)		17,737	39-36
76	June 26	@ Indians	8 – 5	Betancourt (1-0)	Embree (1-1)		18,494	39-37
77	June 27	@ Indians	13 – 2	DiNardo (3-4)	Carmona (8-4)		18,614	40-37
78	June 28	@ Indians	4 – 3	Byrd (7-3)	Flores (0-2)	Borowski (22)	22,921	40-38
79	June 29	@ Yankees	2 – 1	Mussina (4-5)	Kennedy (2-6)	Rivera (10)	52,622	40-39
80	June 30	@ Yankees	7 – 0	Gaudin (7-3)	Igawa (2-2)		54,150	41-39

July: 9-18

#	Date	Opponent	Score	Win	Loss	Save	Attendance	Record
81	July 1	@ Yankees	11 – 5	Haren (10-2)	Pettitte (4-6)		54,266	42-39
82	July 2	Blue Jays	11 – 7	Towers (4-5)	DiNardo (3-5)		13,281	42-40
83	July 3	Blue Jays	3 – 1	Blanton (8-4)	Litsch (1-3)		35,077	43-40
84	July 4	Blue Jays	10 – 3	McGowan (5-4)	Kennedy (2-7)		26,566	43-41
85	July 5	Mariners	3 – 2	Gaudin (8-3)	Batista (8-7)	Embree (9)	15,654	44-41
86	July 6	Mariners	7 – 1	O'Flaherty (6-0)	Haren (10-3)		19,158	44-42
87	July 7	Mariners	4 – 0	Hernández (5-4)	Harden (1-2)		29,225	44-43
88	July 8	Mariners	7 – 3	Green (2-1)	Blanton (8-5)		27,059	44-44
89	July 12	@ Twins	6 – 2	Baker (4-3)	Gaudin (8-4)		25,207	44-45
90	July 13	@ Twins	5 – 3	Santana (11-6)	DiNardo (3-6)	Nathan (17)	36,338	44-46
91	July 14	@ Twins	4 – 3	Silva (6-10)	Blanton (8-6)	Nathan (18)	36,066	44-47
92	July 15	@ Twins	4 – 3	Neshek (4-1)	Kennedy (2-8)		36,737	44-48
93	July 16	Rangers	4-1	Wright (3-2)	Braden (1-4)	Gagné (13)	18,160	44-49
94	July 17	Rangers	11 – 4	Eyre (3-3)	Gaudin (8-5)	Mahay (1)	20,209	44-50
95	July 18	Rangers	6 – 0	DiNardo (4-6)	Millwood (6-8)		23,440	45-50
96	July 20	Orioles	6 – 1	Bédard (9-4)	Blanton (8-7)		18,444	45-51
97	July 21	Orioles	4 – 3	Haren (11-3)	Trachsel (5-7)	Embree (10)	30,828	46-51
98	July 22	Orioles	2 – 0	Guthrie (6-3)	Braden (1-5)	Walker (1)	25,552	46-52
99	July 23	@ Angels	12 – 6	Kennedy (3-8)	Colón (6-6)		43,847	47-52
100	July 24	@ Angels	4 – 3	DiNardo (5-6)	Escobar (11-4)	Embree (11)	43,784	48-52
101	July 25	@ Angels	7 – 6	Rodríguez (4-2)	Kennedy (3-9)		44,252	48-53
102	July 26	@ Mariners	6 – 2	Haren (12-3)	Weaver (2-9)		34,250	49-53
103	July 27	@ Mariners	7 – 1	Hernández (7-6)	Braden (1-6)		37,643	49-54
104	July 28	@ Mariners	4 – 3	Ramírez (6-3)	Gaudin (8-6)	Putz (30)	41,260	49-55
105	July 29	@ Mariners	14 – 10	Green (4-1)	Street (2-2)		41,961	49-56
106	July 30	Tigers	5 – 2	Tata (1-0)	Blanton (8-8)	Jones (28)	18,468	49-57
107	July 31	Tigers	7 – 3	Haren (13-3)	Verlander (11-4)		21,305	50-57

August: 17-12

#	Date	Opponent	Score	Win	Loss	Save	Attendance	Record
108	August 1	Tigers	3 – 2	Brown (1-0)	Robertson (6-9)	Embree (12)	27,118	51-57
109	August 2	Angels	6 – 4	Saunders (5-0)	Gaudin (8-7)	Rodríguez (26)	21,654	51-58
110	August 3	Angels	8 – 4	Casilla (3-1)	Shields (3-4)		21,552	52-58
111	August 4	Angels	2 – 1	Blanton (9-8)	Escobar (11-6)	Embree (13)	29,144	53-58
112	August 5	Angels	4 – 3	Lackey (14-6)	Calero (1-5)	Rodríguez (27)	26,782	53-59
113	August 6	@ Rangers	9 – 7 (13)	Brown (2-0)	Eyre (3-5)	Calero (1)	24,737	54-59
114	August 7	@ Rangers	8 – 6	Gabbard (5-1)	Gaudin (8-8)	Wilson (3)	25,122	54-60
115	August 8	@ Rangers	6 – 3	DiNardo (6-6)	Murray (0-1)	Embree (14)	29,647	55-60
116	August 10	@ Tigers	16 – 10	Lugo (3-0)	McBride (1-1)		40,922	56-60
117	August 11	@ Tigers	5 – 2	Verlander (12-4)	Haren (13-4)	Jones (31)	42,016	56-61
118	August 12	@ Tigers	11 – 6	Robertson (7-9)	Braden (1-7)		39,960	56-62
119	August 13	@ Tigers	7 – 2	Gaudin (9-8)	Durbin (7-5)		37,229	57-62
120	August 14	White Sox	4 – 3	DiNardo (7-6)	Garland (8-8)	Embree (15)	24,082	58-62
121	August 15	White Sox	3 – 2	Blanton (10-8)	Buehrle (9-8)	Street (10)	25,295	59-62
122	August 16	White Sox	8 – 5 (10)	Lugo (4-0)	Thornton (3-4)		20,218	60-62
123	August 17	Royals	8 – 2	Bannister (9-7)	Meyer (0-1)		18,185	60-63
124	August 18	Royals	7 – 3	Pérez (8-11)	Gaudin (9-9)		24,638	60-64
125	August 19	Royals	6 – 1	DiNardo (8-6)	Davies (5-10)		26,445	61-64
126	August 20	@ Blue Jays	6 – 4	Blanton (11-8)	Marcum (10-5)	Street (11)	27,193	62-64
127	August 21	@ Blue Jays	6 – 4	Haren (14-4)	Tallet (2-3)	Street (12)	32,639	63-64
128	August 22	@ Blue Jays	4 – 1	Loaiza (1-0)	Burnett (7-7)	Embree (16)	31,145	64-64
129	August 23	@ Devil Rays	12 – 2	Gaudin (10-9)	Hammel (1-4)		9,444	65-64
130	August 24	@ Devil Rays	12 – 2	Shields (10-8)	DiNardo (8-7)		9,592	65-65
131	August 25	@ Devil Rays	14 – 3	Kazmir (10-8)	Blanton (11-9)		18,163	65-66
132	August 26	@ Devil Rays	7 – 4	Sonnanstine (3-9)	Haren (14-5)	Reyes (20)	19,044	65-67
133	August 27	Blue Jays	6 – 2 (12)	Accardo (3-3)	Embree (1-2)		18,092	65-68
134	August 28	Blue Jays	5 – 4	Wolfe (3-1)	Brown (2-1)	Janssen (4)	20,542	65-69
135	August 29	Blue Jays	5 – 4 (11)	Lugo (5-0)	Frasor (1-4)		16,015	66-69
136	August 31	Tigers	5 – 4 (10)	Street (3-2)	Zumaya (1-3)		27,250	67-69

September: 9-17

#	Date	Opponent	Score	Win	Loss	Save	Attendance	Record
137	September 1	Tigers	6 – 1	Verlander (15-5)	Haren (14-6)		21,336	67-70
138	September 2	Tigers	8 – 7 (10)	Street (4-2)	Bazardo (0-1)		23,195	68-70
139	September 3	@ Angels	9 – 5	Santana (6-12)	Gaudin (10-10)		39,164	68-71
140	September 4	@ Angels	4 – 3	Weaver (11-6)	DiNardo (8-8)	Rodríguez (34)	39,017	68-72
141	September 5	@ Angels	6 – 2	Blanton (12-9)	Saunders (7-3)		34,000	69-72
142	September 7	@ Rangers	5 – 3	Vólquez (2-0)	Haren (14-7)	Benoit (4)	22,318	69-73
143	September 8	@ Rangers	7 – 3	Murray (1-1)	Gaudin (10-11)		32,476	69-74
144	September 9	@ Rangers	12 – 9	White (1-0)	DiNardo (8-9)		25,054	69-75
145	September 10	@ Mariners	9 – 3	Blanton (13-9)	Ramírez (8-9)	Street (13)	26,698	70-75
146	September 11	@ Mariners	7 – 4	Lugo (6-0)	Washburn (9-14)	Street (14)	26,676	71-75
147	September 12	@ Mariners	6 – 5	Putz (3-1)	Brown (2-2)		26,194	71-76
148	September 13	Rangers	6 – 5	Gaudin (11-11)	Millwood (9-12)	Street (15)	16,240	72-76
149	September 14	Rangers	11 – 9	Brown (3-2)	Rheinecker (2-2)	Street (16)	19,346	73-76
150	September 15	Rangers	7 – 3	Blanton (14-9)	McCarthy (5-10)	Embree (17)	24,517	74-76
151	September 16	Rangers	11 – 9	Rheinecker (3-2)	Brown (3-3)	Benoit (5)	23,770	74-77
152	September 17	Mariners	4 – 0	Batista (14-11)	Haren (14-8)		17,228	74-78
153	September 18	Mariners	8 – 7	Weaver (7-12)	Gaudin (11-12)	Sherrill (2)	18,145	74-79
154	September 19	Mariners	9 – 5	Hernández (13-7)	Meyer (0-2)		21,171	74-80
155	September 21	@ Indians	4 – 3	Carmona (18-8)	Blanton (14-10)	Borowski (43)	36,016	74-81
156	September 22	@ Indians	9 – 3	Haren (15-8)	Byrd (15-7)		40,663	75-81
157	September 23	@ Indians	6 – 2	Westbrook (6-9)	Braden (1-8)	Betancourt (2)	40,250	75-82
158	September 25	@ Red Sox	7 – 3	Schilling (9-8)	Gaudin (11-13)		36,708	75-83
159	September 26	@ Red Sox	11 – 6	Timlin (2-1)	Blevins (0-1)		36,570	75-84
160	September 28	Angels	2 – 0	Lackey (19-9)	Haren (15-9)	Rodríguez (39)	32,287	75-85
161	September 29	Angels	3 – 2	Escobar (18-7)	DiNardo (8-10)	Rodríguez (40)	26,480	75-86
162	September 30	Angels	3 – 2	Street (5-2)	Bootcheck (3-3)		28,062	76-86

=== Notable games ===
- April 5, 2007 – Mike Piazza hits a go-ahead home run to center field giving the A's a 4-3 win over the Los Angeles Angels of Anaheim. It was notable because it was his first home run of the season, his first as an Oakland Athletic, and his first ever at Angel Stadium.
- April 15, 2007 – Trailing 4-2 in the bottom of the ninth with two outs against the New York Yankees, Todd Walker got a hit and Jason Kendall was walked to put two men on base. Backup Marco Scutaro who was then 1 for 20 on the season hit a home run to left field which gave the A's a remarkable 5-4 win as well as the series vs. the Yankees.
- May 13, 2007 – Again trailing by two in the bottom of the ninth with two outs, the Athletics seemed to be out vs. the Cleveland Indians. However Chavez overcame a 0-2 strike count to hit a single and get on board. Milton Bradley then hit a home run to right field to tie the game. After Dan Johnson and Bobby Crosby got on base, Jack Cust, coming off a hot streak after being in the lineup for seven days at the time, hit a three-run shot to center field which gave the A's another dramatic comeback at home for a 10-7 victory.
- May 18, 2007 – The first game of the season against the San Francisco Giants saw former A's pitcher Barry Zito return to Oakland and try to beat his former team. However, the A's would not allow that. Zito allowed seven runs and six hits in four-plus innings, and walked seven. The A's would pound the Giants even harder, scoring eight runs on the Giants bullpen, including a Mark Ellis grand slam for a 15-3 win.
- June 2, 2007 – Joe Blanton hit nine scoreless innings for his fifth complete game against the Minnesota Twins. The Twins' pitcher Carlos Silva also pitched the entire eight innings in which the Twins were on the field. (The A's were at home, so the bottom of the ninth was not necessary.) The one run Silva allowed was the difference as the A's won 1-0.
- June 4, 2007 – Mark Ellis was having a great day for the entire game vs. the Boston Red Sox. After hitting a triple in the bottom of the 2nd which gave the A's the lead, he would hit a home run in the fourth, and a double in the sixth. With a chance to hit for the cycle in the bottom of the eighth, Ellis grounded the ball into a fielder's choice and was not awarded a single, despite that no one was out as a result of the play. With the A's having a 4-2 lead it seemed like Ellis would not hit for the cycle. However, the Red Sox would tie the game in the top of the ninth, and the A's were unable to break the tie in the bottom of the inning. This was a blessing in disguise as Mark Ellis had another chance to hit for the cycle, which he did with a single to midfield. He was the sixth player in the Oakland Athletics to hit for the cycle (not including when the A's were in Philadelphia and Kansas City). Eric Chavez, who has also hit for the cycle in 2000, won the game with a solo home run in the 11th.
- June 7, 2007 – Shannon Stewart broke up a hitless game for the A's in the bottom of the ninth. This spoiled Red Sox pitcher Curt Schilling's bid for his first career no-hitter. The A's however could not score, and Schilling still walked away with a complete game 1-0 shutout. It was Boston's only win of the four-game series.

== Player stats ==
=== Batting ===
==== Starters by position ====
Note: Pos = Position; G = Games played; AB = At bats; H = Hits; Avg. = Batting average; HR = Home runs; RBI = Runs batted in

Pos	Player	G	AB	H	Avg.	HR	RBI
C	Jason Kendall	80	292	66	.226	2	22
1B	Dan Johnson	117	416	98	.236	18	62
2B	Mark Ellis	150	583	161	.276	19	76
SS	Bobby Crosby	93	349	79	.226	8	31
3B	Eric Chavez	90	341	82	.240	15	46
LF	Shannon Stewart	146	576	167	.290	12	48
CF	Nick Swisher	150	539	141	.262	22	78
RF	Travis Buck	82	285	82	.288	7	34
DH	Mike Piazza	83	309	85	.275	8	44

==== Other batters ====
Note: G = Games played; AB = At bats; H = Hits; Avg. = Batting average; HR = Home runs; RBI = Runs batted in

Player	G	AB	H	Avg.	HR	RBI
Jack Cust	124	395	101	.256	26	82
Marco Scutaro	104	338	88	.260	7	41
Kurt Suzuki	68	213	53	.249	7	39
Mark Kotsay	56	206	44	.214	1	20
Jack Hannahan	41	144	40	.278	3	24
Donnie Murphy	42	118	26	.220	6	21
Daric Barton	18	72	25	.347	4	8
Milton Bradley	19	65	19	.292	2	7
Jeff DaVanon	26	63	15	.238	0	5
Todd Walker	18	48	13	.271	0	4
Rob Bowen	21	43	12	.279	2	5
Bobby Kielty	13	35	7	.200	0	3
Danny Putnam	11	28	6	.214	1	2
Adam Melhuse	12	26	6	.231	0	2
Chris Snelling	6	20	7	.350	0	0
J.J. Furmaniak	16	17	3	.176	0	1
Hiram Bocachica	6	17	1	.059	1	3
Kevin Thompson	9	14	1	.071	0	1
Ryan Langerhans	2	4	0	.000	0	0
Dee Brown	8	3	0	.000	0	0
Kevin Melillo	1	0	0	----	0	0

=== Pitching ===
==== Starting pitchers ====
Note: G = Games pitched; IP = Innings pitched; W = Wins; L = Losses; ERA = Earned run average; SO = Strikeouts

Player	G	IP	W	L	ERA	SO
Joe Blanton	34	230.0	14	10	3.95	140
Dan Haren	34	222.2	15	9	3.07	192
Chad Gaudin	34	199.1	11	13	4.42	154
Esteban Loaiza	2	14.2	1	0	1.84	5

==== Other pitchers ====
Note: G = Games pitched; IP = Innings pitched; W = Wins; L = Losses; ERA = Earned run average; SO = Strikeouts

Player	G	IP	W	L	ERA	SO
Lenny DiNardo	35	131.1	8	10	4.11	59
Joe Kennedy	27	101.0	3	9	4.37	42
Dallas Braden	20	72.1	1	8	6.72	55
Rich Harden	7	25.2	1	2	2.45	27
Dan Meyer	6	16.1	0	2	8.82	11

==== Relief pitchers ====
Note: G = Games pitched; W = Wins; L = Losses; SV = Saves; ERA = Earned run average; SO = Strikeouts

Player	G	W	L	SV	ERA	SO
Huston Street	48	5	2	16	2.88	63
Alan Embree	68	1	2	7	3.97	51
Jay Marshall	51	1	2	0	6.43	18
Santiago Casilla	46	3	1	2	4.44	52
Kiko Calero	46	1	5	1	5.75	31
Andrew Brown	33	3	3	0	4.54	43
Ruddy Lugo	27	4	0	0	4.30	26
Colby Lewis	26	0	2	0	6.45	23
Ron Flores	17	0	2	0	3.57	15
Justin Duchscherer	17	3	3	0	4.96	13
Jay Witasick	16	1	0	0	3.60	10
Jerry Blevins	6	0	1	0	9.64	3
Erasmo Ramirez	3	0	0	0	0.00	0
Connor Robertson	3	0	0	0	18.00	2
Shane Komine	2	0	0	0	4.70	1

== Farm system ==
Level	Team	League	Manager
AAA	Sacramento River Cats	Pacific Coast League	Tony DeFrancesco
AA	Midland RockHounds	Texas League	Todd Steverson
A	Stockton Ports	California League	Darren Bush
A	Kane County Cougars	Midwest League	Aaron Nieckula
A-Short Season	Vancouver Canadians	Northwest League	Rick Magnante
Rookie	AZL Athletics	Arizona League	Ruben Escalera

LEAGUE CHAMPIONS: Sacramento
