= 2007 Seattle Mariners season =

2007 Seattle Mariners
- League: American League
- Division: West
- Ballpark: Safeco Field
- City: Seattle, Washington
- Record: 88–74 (.543)
- Divisional place: 2nd
- Owners: Nintendo of America (represented by Howard Lincoln)
- General manager: Bill Bavasi
- Managers: Mike Hargrove 44–33 (.571) (resigned July 1); John McLaren 44–41 (.518)
- Television: KSTW-TV (Dave Niehaus, Dave Sims, Rick Rizzs, Mike Blowers); FSN Northwest (Dave Niehaus, Dave Sims, Rick Rizzs, Mike Blowers)
- Radio: KOMO (English) (Dave Niehaus, Rick Rizzs); KDOW (Spanish) (Alex Rivera, Julio Cruz)

The 2007 Seattle Mariners season was the 31st season in franchise history. The Mariners played their 8th full season (9th overall) at Safeco Field and finished with a record of 88–74, clinching their first winning season since 2003.

The Mariners signed free agent infielders Adrián Beltré and Richie Sexson to multi-year contracts before the season. The team also traded for designated hitter José Vidro.

After spending two and a half seasons managing the Mariners and guiding the team to a 44–33 (.571) record this season, including a major league-best 25-12 record since May 22, manager Mike Hargrove shocked the team by announcing his resignation prior to a July 1 game against the Toronto Blue Jays. Hargrove said he could no longer give the same passion or commitment to his bosses and players. Bench coach John McLaren was named as Hargrove's replacement. The Mariners won eight consecutive games between June 23 and July 1, making Hargrove the first manager since 1900 to resign after a winning streak of more than seven games.

That eight-game streak was the longest winning streak of the season, while their longest losing streak was nine, from August 25 to September 2. That losing streak effectively ended their effort to make the playoffs. The team finished six games out of the playoffs.

For the seventh consecutive time in his seven-year MLB career, Ichiro Suzuki was named to the All-Star Game, held at AT&T Park in San Francisco. Closer J. J. Putz was selected to his first All-Star Game. Suzuki was named the All-Star Game MVP after going 3-for-3 with a two-run, inside-the-park home run (the first home run in All-Star history to be hit inside the park). Three days after the All-Star Game, on July 13, the Mariners announced that they had signed Suzuki to a five-year contract extension with an estimated value of $90 million, making Suzuki the highest-paid player in Mariners history for the second time.

Suzuki led the majors with 238 hits and 203 singles. Suzuki won a Silver Slugger Award, and he and Beltré won Gold Glove Awards. Jeff Weaver tied for the American League lead with two shutouts while Putz tied for second with 40 saves.

== Regular season ==
=== Season standings ===
AL West
Team	W	L	Pct.	GB	Home	Road
Los Angeles Angels of Anaheim	94	68	.580	—	54‍–‍27	40‍–‍41
Seattle Mariners	88	74	.543	6	49‍–‍33	39‍–‍41
Oakland Athletics	76	86	.469	18	40‍–‍41	36‍–‍45
Texas Rangers	75	87	.463	19	47‍–‍34	28‍–‍53

=== Record vs. opponents ===
2007 American League record Source: MLB Standings Grid – 2007
Team	BAL	BOS	CWS	CLE	DET	KC	LAA	MIN	NYY	OAK	SEA	TB	TEX	TOR	NL
Baltimore	—	6–12	5–3	3–4	1–5	7–0	3–7	0–7	9–9	4–4	2–7	11–7	4–6	8–10	6–12
Boston	12–6	—	7–1	5–2	3–4	3–3	6–4	4–3	8–10	4–4	4–5	13–5	6–4	9–9	12–6
Chicago	3–5	1–7	—	7–11	11–7	12–6	5–4	9–9	4–6	4–5	1–7	6–1	2–4	3–4	4–14
Cleveland	4–3	2–5	11–7	—	12–6	11–7	5–5	14–4	0–6	6–4	4–3	8–2	6–3	4–2	9–9
Detroit	5–1	4–3	7–11	6–12	—	11–7	3–5	12–6	4–4	4–6	6–4	3–4	5–4	4–3	14–4
Kansas City	0–7	3–3	6–12	7–11	7–11	—	5–2	9–9	1–9	6–4	3–6	4–3	5–4	3–4	10–8
Los Angeles	7–3	4–6	4–5	5–5	5–3	2–5	—	6–3	6–3	9–10	13–6	6–2	10–9	3–4	14–4
Minnesota	7–0	3–4	9–9	4–14	6–12	9–9	3–6	—	2–5	5–2	6–3	3–4	7–2	4–6	11–7
New York	9–9	10–8	6–4	6–0	4–4	9–1	3–6	5–2	—	2–4	5–5	10–8	5–1	10–8	10–8
Oakland	4–4	4–4	5–4	4–6	6–4	4–6	10–9	2–5	4–2	—	5–14	4–6	9–10	5–4	10–8
Seattle	7–2	5–4	7–1	3–4	4–6	6–3	6–13	3–6	5–5	14–5	—	4–3	11–8	4–5	9–9
Tampa Bay	7–11	5–13	1–6	2–8	4–3	3–4	2–6	4–3	8–10	6–4	3–4	—	5–4	9–9	7–11
Texas	6–4	4–6	4–2	3–6	4–5	4–5	9–10	2–7	1–5	10–9	8–11	4–5	—	5–5	11–7
Toronto	10–8	9–9	4–3	2–4	3–4	4–3	4–3	6–4	8–10	4–5	5–4	9–9	5–5	—	10–8

=== Roster ===
2007 Seattle Mariners
Roster
Pitchers: 58 Cha Seung Baek; 43 Miguel Batista; 38 Jorge Campillo; 50 Jason Davis; 31 Ryan Feierabend; 54 Sean Green; 34 Félix Hernández; 60 Jon Huber; 57 Mark Lowe; 40 Julio Mateo; 35 Brandon Morrow; 59 Eric O'Flaherty; 48 John Parrish; 20 J. J. Putz; 26 Horacio Ramírez; 18 Ryan Rowland-Smith; 52 George Sherrill; 56 Jarrod Washburn; 36 Jeff Weaver; 46 Rick White; 46 Sean White; 49 Jake Woods	Catchers: 15 Jamie Burke; 2 Kenji Johjima; 32 Rob Johnson; Infielders: 29 Adrián Beltré; 5 Yuniesky Betancourt; 23 Ben Broussard; 22 Nick Green; 4 José López; 12 Mike Morse; 44 Richie Sexson; 3 José Vidro	Outfielders: 50 Wladimir Balentien; 16 Willie Bloomquist; 9 Jason Ellison; 6 José Guillén; 28 Raúl Ibañez; 25 Charlton Jimerson; 10 Adam Jones; 7 Jeremy Reed; 51 Ichiro Suzuki; Other batters: 9 Jeff Clement	Manager: 21 Mike Hargrove; 8 John McLaren; Coaches: 43 Rafael Chaves (pitching); 13 Carlos García (third base); 47 Mike Goff (first base, bench); 8 John McLaren (bench); -- John Moses (interim first base); 45 Jeff Pentland (hitting); 46 Dan Rohn (administrative coach); 41 Jim Slaton (bullpen); 55 Gary Thurman (first base)

=== Game log ===
2007 game log
April

#	Date	Opponent	Score	Win	Loss	Save	Attendance	Record
1	April 2	Athletics	4–0	Hernández (1–0)	Haren (0–1)		46,003	1–0
2	April 3	Athletics	8–4	Mateo (1–0)	Calero (0–1)		25,287	2–0
3	April 4	Athletics	9–0	Harden (1–0)	Batista (0–1)		22,816	2–1
--	April 6	@ Indians	Postponed (snow) Rescheduled for May 21					2–1
--	April 7	@ Indians	Postponed (snow) Rescheduled for June 11					2–1
--	April 8	@ Indians	Postponed (snow) Rescheduled for August 30					2–1
--	April 9	@ Indians	Postponed (snow) Rescheduled for September 26					2–1
4	April 10	@ Red Sox	14–3	Beckett (2–0)	Weaver (0–1)		35,847	2–2
5	April 11	@ Red Sox	3–0	Hernández (2–0)	Matsuzaka (1–1)		36,630	3–2
--	April 12	@ Red Sox	Postponed (rain) Rescheduled for May 3					3–2
6	April 13	Rangers	5–2	Millwood (2–1)	Washburn (0–1)	Gagné (1)	25,243	3–3
7	April 14	Rangers	8–3	Batista (1–1)	Padilla (0–3)		25,954	4–3
8	April 15	Rangers	14–6	Ramírez (1–0)	McCarthy (1–2)		25,001	5–3
9	April 17	Twins	11–2	Ortiz (3–0)	Weaver (0–2)		19,015	5–4
10	April 18	Twins	5–4	Silva (1–1)	Hernández (2–1)	Nathan (4)	20,871	5–5
11	April 19	Twins	6–5	Santana (3–1)	Washburn (0–2)	Nathan (5)	19,350	5–6
12	April 20	@ Angels	8–4	Saunders (2–0)	Batista (1–2)	Rodríguez (5)	43,359	5–7
13	April 21	@ Angels	7–6	Colón (1–0)	Ramírez (1–1)	Rodríguez (6)	41,752	5–8
14	April 22	@ Angels	6–1	Santana (2–2)	Weaver (0–3)		43,628	5–9
15	April 23	@ Rangers	5–4	Morrow (1–0)	Millwood (2–3)	Putz (1)	26,592	6–9
--	April 24	@ Rangers	Postponed (rain) Rescheduled for July 24					6–9
16	April 25	@ Athletics	2–0	Washburn (1–2)	Blanton (2–1)		19,674	7–9
17	April 26	@ Athletics	4–2	Batista (2–2)	Calero (0–2)	Putz (2)	14,683	8–9
18	April 27	Royals	7–4	Ramírez (2–1)	de la Rosa (2–2)	Putz (3)	37,281	9–9
19	April 28	Royals	8–3	Meche (2–1)	Weaver (0–4)	Duckworth (1)	32,441	9–10
20	April 29	Royals	5–1	Morrow (2–0)	Bannister (0–1)		26,019	10–10

May

#	Date	Opponent	Score	Win	Loss	Save	Attendance	Record
21	May 1	White Sox	5–2	Washburn (2–2)	Vázquez (2–1)	Putz (4)	20,739	11–10
22	May 2	White Sox	3–2	Batista (3–2)	Danks (0–4)	Putz (5)	16,555	12–10
23	May 3	@ Red Sox	8–7	Donnelly (1–1)	Reitsma (0–1)	Romero (1)	37,216	12–11
24	May 4	@ Yankees	15–11	O'Flaherty (1–0)	Bean (0–1)	Putz (6)	49,519	13–11
25	May 5	@ Yankees	8–1	Wang (1–2)	Weaver (0–5)		51,702	13–12
26	May 6	@ Yankees	5–0	Rasner (1–1)	Washburn (2–3)		52,553	13–13
27	May 7	@ Yankees	3–2	Sherrill (1–0)	Rivera (1–3)	Putz (7)	47,424	14–13
28	May 8	@ Tigers	9–7	Bonderman (2–0)	Ramírez (2–2)	Jones (13)	30,171	14–14
29	May 9	@ Tigers	9–2	Baek (1–0)	Robertson (3–2)		27,377	15–14
30	May 10	@ Tigers	7–3	Verlander (3–1)	Weaver (0–6)		37,359	15–15
31	May 11	Yankees	3–0	Washburn (3–3)	Rasner (2–1)	Putz (8)	44,214	16–15
32	May 12	Yankees	7–2	DeSalvo (1–0)	Batista (3–3)		46,153	16–16
33	May 13	Yankees	2–1	Ramírez (3–2)	Pettitte (2–2)	Putz (9)	46,181	17–16
34	May 15	Angels	11–3	White (1–0)	Escobar (4–2)		21,769	18–16
35	May 16	Angels	5–0	Lackey (6–3)	Baek (1–1)		22,331	18–17
36	May 17	Angels	7–3	Colón (5–0)	Washburn (3–4)		20,488	18–18
37	May 18	Padres	8–1	Young (5–3)	Batista (3–4)		39,531	18–19
38	May 19	Padres	7–4	Ramírez (4–2)	Maddux (3–3)	Putz (10)	34,287	19–19
39	May 20	Padres	2–1	Germano (2–0)	Hernández (2–2)	Hoffman (11)	38,844	19–20
40	May 21	@ Indians	5–2	Mastny (3–1)	Baek (1–2)	Borowski (14)	38,645	19–21
41	May 22	@ Devil Rays	5–2	Washburn (4–4)	Orvella (0–1)	Putz (11)	9,254	20–21
42	May 23	@ Devil Rays	5–1	Batista (4–4)	Fossum (3–4)		8,440	21–21
43	May 24	@ Devil Rays	13–12	Seo (3–4)	White (1–1)		9,149	21–22
44	May 25	@ Royals	10–2	Hernández (3–2)	Meche (3–3)		28,651	22–22
45	May 26	@ Royals	9–1	Baek (2–2)	Bannister (0–3)		21,138	23–22
46	May 27	@ Royals	7–4	Washburn (5–4)	Pérez (2–5)	Putz (12)	16,091	24–22
47	May 28	@ Angels	12–5	Batista (5–4)	Colón (5–2)		42,352	25–22
48	May 29	@ Angels	4–1	Santana (4–6)	Feierabend (0–1)	Rodríguez (17)	38,174	25–23
49	May 30	@ Angels	8–6	Moseley (4–0)	Hernández (3–3)	Rodríguez (18)	39,288	25–24
50	May 31	Rangers	9–5	Baek (3–2)	Padilla (2–8)		20,137	26–24

June

#	Date	Opponent	Score	Win	Loss	Save	Attendance	Record
51	June 1	Rangers	9–8	Benoit (2–1)	Green (0–1)	Gagné (4)	34,570	26–25
52	June 2	Rangers	5–4	Batista (6–4)	Loe (1–5)	Putz (13)	41,988	27–25
53	June 3	Rangers	11–6	Feierabend (1–1)	Tejeda (4–6)		36,886	28–25
54	June 4	Orioles	7–4	Sherrill (2–0)	Bradford (0–2)	Putz (14)	19,090	29–25
55	June 5	Orioles	5–4	Davis (1–0)	Walker (1–1)	Putz (15)	19,287	30–25
56	June 6	Orioles	9–5	Cabrera (5–6)	Washburn (5–5)		29,010	30–26
57	June 8	@ Padres	6–5 (11)	O'Flaherty (2–0)	Meredith (2–4)	Putz (16)	44,325	31–26
58	June 9	@ Padres	6–5	Green (1–1)	Brocail (2–1)	Putz (17)	37,178	32–36
59	June 10	@ Padres	4–3	Batista (7–4)	Hoffman (2–3)	Putz (18)	35,950	33–26
60	June 11	@ Indians	8–7	Morrow (3–0)	Borowski (0–3)		22,325	34–26
61	June 12	@ Cubs	5–3 (13)	O'Flaherty (3–0)	Ohman (0–4)	Putz (19)	40,071	35–26
62	June 13	@ Cubs	3–2	Marshall (3–2)	Batista (7–5)	Dempster (14)	40,163	35–27
63	June 14	@ Cubs	5–4	Howry (3–3)	Morrow (3–1)		39,846	35–28
64	June 15	@ Astros	5–1	Rodríguez (4–6)	Hernández (3–4)		37,322	35–29
65	June 16	@ Astros	9–4	Williams (3–9)	Baek (3–3)		41,974	35–30
66	June 17	@ Astros	10–3	Oswalt (7–4)	Washburn (5–6)		42,019	35–31
67	June 19	Pirates	5–3	Gorzelanny (7–4)	Batista (7–6)	Chacón (1)	24,520	35–32
68	June 20	Pirates	7–0	Weaver (1–6)	Maholm (3–10)		23,553	36–32
69	June 21	Pirates	3–0	Hernández (4–4)	Van Benschoten (0–2)	Putz (20)	22,950	37–32
70	June 22	Reds	16–1	Harang (8–2)	Feierabend (1–2)		46,340	37–33
71	June 23	Reds	9–1	Washburn (6–6)	Lohse (3–10)		45,939	38–33
72	June 24	Reds	3–2	O'Flaherty (4–0)	Arroyo (2–9)	Putz (21)	46,064	39–33
73	June 25	Red Sox	9–5	Weaver (2–6)	Tavárez (5–5)		33,830	40–33
74	June 26	Red Sox	8–7	O'Flaherty (5–0)	López (1–1)	Putz (22)	35,045	41–33
75	June 27	Red Sox	2–1 (11)	Davis (2–0)	Piñeiro (1–1)		43,448	42–33
76	June 29	Blue Jays	5–3	Washburn (7–6)	McGowan (4–4)	Putz (23)	41,862	43–33
77	June 30	Blue Jays	8–3	Batista (8–6)	Halladay (9–3)		36,102	44–33

July

#	Date	Opponent	Score	Win	Loss	Save	Attendance	Record
78	July 1	Blue Jays	2–1	Putz (1–0)	Accardo (1–3)		38,778	45–33
79	July 2	@ Royals	3–2 (11)	Dotel (1–1)	Morrow (3–2)		13,257	45–34
80	July 3	@ Royals	17–3	de la Rosa (6–9)	Feierabend (1–3)		28,140	45–35
81	July 4	@ Royals	4–0	Washburn (8–6)	Bannister (5–5)	Putz (24)	27,797	46–35
82	July 5	@ Athletics	3–2	Gaudin (8–3)	Batista (8–7)	Embree (9)	15,654	46–36
83	July 6	@ Athletics	7–1	O'Flaherty (6–0)	Haren (10–3)		19,158	47–36
84	July 7	@ Athletics	4–0	Hernández (5–4)	Harden (1–2)		29,225	48–36
85	July 8	@ Athletics	7–3	Green (2–1)	Blanton (8–5)		27,059	49–36
86	July 12	Tigers	3–2	Hernández (6–4)	Miller (4–3)	Putz (25)	31,994	50–36
87	July 13	Tigers	6–3	Bonderman (10–1)	Washburn (8–7)	Jones (23)	37,393	50–37
88	July 14	Tigers	6–4	Batista (9–7)	Rogers (3–1)	Putz (26)	38,202	51–37
89	July 15	Tigers	11–7	Verlander (11–3)	Weaver (2–7)		39,073	51–38
90	July 16	Orioles	4–2	Ramírez (5–2)	Burres (4–4)	Putz (27)	23,128	52–38
91	July 17	Orioles	8–3	Guthrie (5–3)	Hernández (6–5)		22,470	52–39
92	July 18	Orioles	6–5	Green (3–1)	Báez (0–5)	Putz (28)	28,550	53–39
93	July 20	@ Blue Jays	4–2	Batista (10–7)	Litsch (2–4)	Putz (29)	27,079	54–39
94	July 21	@ Blue Jays	1–0	Towers (5–6)	Weaver (2–8)	Accardo (15)	28,921	54–40
95	July 22	@ Blue Jays	8–0	Halladay (11–4)	Hernández (6–6)		29,083	54–41
96	July 23	@ Rangers	8–7	Millwood (7–8)	Ramírez (5–3)		20,584	54–42
97	July 24	@ Rangers	2–1	Rheinecker (1–0)	Feierabend (1–4)	Gagné (15)	26,842	54–43
98	July 24	@ Rangers	4–3	Wilson (2–1)	Reitsma (0–2)	Gagné (16)	26,842	54–44
99	July 25	@ Rangers	7–6	Benoit (4–3)	Putz (1–1)		34,853	54–45
100	July 26	Athletics	6–2	Haren (12–3)	Weaver (2–9)		34,250	54–46
101	July 27	Athletics	7–1	Hernández (7–6)	Braden (1–6)		37,643	55–46
102	July 28	Athletics	4–3	Ramírez (6–3)	Gaudin (8–6)	Putz (30)	41,260	56–46
103	July 29	Athletics	14–10	Green (4–1)	Street (2–2)		41,961	57–46
104	July 30	Angels	2–0	Batista (11–7)	Escobar (11–5)	Putz (31)	31,232	58–46
105	July 31	Angels	8–0	Lackey (13–6)	Weaver (2–10)		28,903	58–47

August

#	Date	Opponent	Score	Win	Loss	Save	Attendance	Record
106	August 1	Angels	8–7 (12)	O'Flaherty (7–0)	Speier (0–2)		34,471	59–47
107	August 3	Red Sox	7–4	Green (5–1)	Timlin (1–1)	Putz (32)	46,235	60–47
108	August 4	Red Sox	4–3	Matsuzaka (13–8)	Washburn (8–8)	Papelbon (25)	46,313	60–48
109	August 5	Red Sox	9–2	Beckett (14–5)	Batista (11–8)		46,377	60–49
110	August 7	@ Orioles	10–3	Weaver (3–10)	Walker (1–2)		25,060	61–49
111	August 8	@ Orioles	8–4	Hernández (8–6)	Guthrie (7–4)	Putz (33)	17,511	62–49
112	August 9	@ Orioles	13–8	Ramírez (7–3)	Cabrera (8–12)	Sherrill (1)	18,679	63–49
113	August 10	@ White Sox	5–3	Vázquez (10–6)	Washburn (8–9)	Jenks (33)	38,586	63–50
114	August 11	@ White Sox	7–6	Batista (12–8)	Floyd (1–2)	Putz (34)	38,210	64–50
115	August 12	@ White Sox	6–0	Weaver (4–10)	Danks (6–10)		36,629	65–50
116	August 13	Twins	4–3	Putz (2–1)	Guerrier (1–4)		37,902	66–50
117	August 14	Twins	11–3	Garza ()	Ramírez (7–4)		33,729	66–51
118	August 15	Twins	6–1	Neshek (7–2)	Washburn (8–10)		42,921	66–52
119	August 17	White Sox	5–4	Batista (13–8)	Contreras (6–15)	Putz (35)	46,170	67–52
120	August 18	White Sox	7–5	Weaver (5–10)	Danks (6–11)	Putz (36)	41,121	68–52
121	August 19	White Sox	11–5	Hernández (9–6)	Garland (8–9)		45,668	69–52
122	August 20	@ Twins	9–4	Ramírez (8–4)	Garza (2–4)		31,755	70–52
123	August 21	@ Twins	7–2	Washburn (9–10)	Baker (6–6)		42,373	71–52
124	August 22	@ Twins	8–4	Silva (10–12)	Batista (13–9)		29,881	71–53
125	August 23	@ Rangers	9–4	Weaver (6–10)	Loe (6–10)		26,963	72–53
126	August 24	@ Rangers	4–2	Hernández (10–6)	Millwood (8–11)	Putz (37)	32,716	73–53
127	August 25	@ Rangers	5–3	Benoit (7–3)	White (1–1)	Wilson (8)	47,977	73–54
128	August 26	@ Rangers	5–3	Padilla (4–9)	Washburn (9–11)		25,437	73–55
129	August 27	Angels	6–0	Lackey (16–8)	Batista (13–10)		45,998	73–56
130	August 28	Angels	10–6	Speier (2–3)	Morrow (3–3)		44,395	73–57
131	August 29	Angels	8–2	Weaver (10–6)	Hernández (10–7)		46,047	73–58
132	August 30	@ Indians	6–5	Borowski (3–5)	O'Flaherty (7–1)		25,949	73–59
133	August 31	@ Blue Jays	7–5	Marcum (12–5)	Washburn (9–12)	Accardo (26)	34,518	73–60

September

#	Date	Opponent	Score	Win	Loss	Save	Attendance	Record
134	September 1	@ Blue Jays	2–1	McGowan (9–8)	Green (5–2)	Accardo (27)	30,672	73–61
135	September 2	@ Blue Jays	6–4	Burnett (8–7)	Weaver (6–11)	Janssen (5)	32,166	73–62
136	September 3	@ Yankees	7–1	Hernández (11–7)	Clemens (6–6)		54,522	74–62
137	September 4	@ Yankees	12–3	Wang (17–6)	Ramírez (8–5)		52,487	74–63
138	September 5	@ Yankees	10–2	Chamberlain (1–0)	Washburn (9–13)		52,538	74–64
139	September 7	@ Tigers	6–1	Verlander (16–5)	Batista (13–11)		39,750	74–65
140	September 8	@ Tigers	12–6	Miner (3–3)	Weaver (6–12)		42,184	74–66
141	September 9	@ Tigers	14–7	Hernández (12–7)	Bonderman (11–9)		39,990	75–66
142	September 10	Athletics	9–3	Blanton (13–9)	Ramírez (8–6)	Street (13)	29,698	75–67
143	September 11	Athletics	7–4	Lugo (6–0)	Washburn (9–14)	Street (14)	26,676	75–68
144	September 12	Athletics	6–5	Putz (3–1)	Brown (2–2)		26,194	76–68
145	September 13	Devil Rays	8–7	Rowland-Smith (1–0)	Wheeler (1–8)	Putz (38)	23,991	77–68
146	September 14	Devil Rays	2–1	Putz (4–1)	Glover (5–5)		30,164	78–68
147	September 15	Devil Rays	6–2	Kazmir (13–8)	Ramírez (8–7)		33,793	78–69
148	September 16	Devil Rays	9–2	Sonnanstine (6–9)	Washburn (9–15)		36,234	78–70
149	September 17	@ Athletics	4–0	Batista (14–11)	Haren (14–8)		17,228	79–70
150	September 18	@ Athletics	8–7	Weaver (7–12)	Gaudin (11–12)	Sherrill (2)	18,145	80–70
151	September 19	@ Athletics	9–5	Hernández (13–7)	Meyer (0–2)		21,171	81–70
152	September 20	@ Angels	9–5	Weaver (13–7)	Feierabend (1–5)		40,016	81–71
153	September 21	@ Angels	6–0	Washburn (10–15)	Saunders (8–4)		44,018	82–71
154	September 22	@ Angels	3–2	Batista (15–11)	Colón (6–8)	Putz (39)	43,583	83–71
155	September 23	@ Angels	7–4	Lackey (18–9)	Weaver (7–13)	Rodríguez (38)	44,234	83–72
156	September 25	Indians	4–3 (12)	Mastny (7–2)	Morrow (3–4)	Betancourt (3)	22,200	83–73
157	September 26	@ Indians*	12–4	Carmona (19–8)	Feierabend (1–6)		n/a	83–74
158	September 26	Indians	3–2 (10)	Putz (5–1)	Fultz (4–3)		26,801	84–74
159	September 27	Indians	4–2	Baek (4–3)	Byrd (15–8)	Sherrill (3)	21,285	85–74
160	September 28	Rangers	6–4	Putz (6–1)	Wood (3–2)		31,954	86–74
161	September 29	Rangers	5–1	Batista (16–11)	Millwood (10–14)		26,799	87–74
162	September 30	Rangers	4–2	Hernández (14–7)	Murray (1–2)	Putz (40)	30,442	88–74
*At Safeco Field in Seattle, Washington

=== Player stats ===
==== Regular batters ====
Note: G = Games played; AB = At bats; H = Hits; Avg. = Batting average; HR = Home runs; RBI = Runs batted in

Player	G	AB	H	Avg.	HR	RBI
Adrián Beltré, 3B	149	595	164	.276	26	99
Yuniesky Betancourt, SS	155	536	172	.289	9	67
José Guillén, RF	153	593	155	.289	23	99
Raúl Ibañez, LF	149	573	167	.291	21	105
Kenji Johjima, C	135	485	139	.287	14	61
José López, 2B	149	524	132	.252	11	62
Richie Sexson, 1B	121	434	89	.205	21	63
Ichiro Suzuki, CF	161	678	238	.351	6	68
José Vidro, DH	147	548	172	.314	6	59

==== Other batters ====
Note: G = Games played; AB = At bats; H = Hits; Avg. = Batting average; HR = Home runs; RBI = Runs batted in

Player	G	AB	H	Avg.	HR	RBI
Ben Broussard	99	240	66	.275	7	29
Willie Bloomquist	91	173	48	.277	2	13
Jamie Burke	50	113	34	.301	1	12
Adam Jones	41	65	16	.246	2	4
Jason Ellison	63	46	13	.283	0	0
Mike Morse	9	18	8	.444	0	3
Jeremy Reed	13	17	3	.176	0	0
Jeff Clement	4	16	6	.375	2	3
Nick Green	6	7	0	.000	0	0
Wladimir Balentien	3	3	2	.667	1	4
Rob Johnson	6	3	1	.333	0	0
Charlton Jimerson	11	2	2	1.000	1	1

==== Pitching ====
===== Starting pitchers =====
Note: GS = Games started; IP = Innings pitched; W = Wins; L = Losses; ERA = Earned run average; SO = Strikeouts

Player	GS	IP	W	L	ERA	SO
Cha Seung Baek	14	73.1	4	3	5.15	49
Miguel Batista	32	193.0	16	11	4.29	133
Ryan Feierabend	9	49.1	1	6	8.03	27
Félix Hernández	30	190.1	14	7	3.92	165
Horacio Ramírez	20	98.0	8	7	7.16	40
Jarrod Washburn	32	193.2	10	15	4.32	114
Jeff Weaver	27	146.2	7	13	6.20	80

===== Relief pitchers =====
Note: G = Games pitched; IP = Innings pitched; SV = Saves; W = Wins; L = Losses; H = Hits; ERA = Earned run average; SO = Strikeouts

Player	G	IP	W	L	H	SV	ERA	SO
Jorge Campillo	4	13.1	0	0	18	0	6.75	9
Jason Davis (8 Cle)	16	25.2	2	0	29	0	6.31	14
Sean Green	64	68.0	5	2	77	0	3.84	53
Jon Huber	9	11.1	0	0	13	0	4.76	8
Mark Lowe	4	2.2	0	0	2	0	6.75	3
Julio Mateo	9	12.0	1	0	12	0	3.75	4
Brandon Morrow	60	63.1	3	4	56	0	4.12	66
Eric O'Flaherty	56	52.1	7	1	45	0	4.47	36
John Parrish (45 Bal)	8	10.1	0	0	22	0	6.97	5
J. J. Putz	68	71.2	6	1	37	40	1.38	82
Chris Reitsma	26	23.2	0	2	37	0	7.61	11
Ryan Rowland-Smith	26	38.2	1	0	39	0	3.96	42
George Sherrill	73	45.2	2	0	28	3	2.36	56
Sean White	15	35.1	1	1	35	0	5.60	16
Jake Woods	4	10.2	0	0	9	0	5.91	4
Rick White (23 Hou)	6	5.1	0	1	42	0	5.84	19

== Farm system ==
Level	Team	League	Manager
AAA	Tacoma Rainiers	Pacific Coast League	Daren Brown
AA	West Tenn Diamond Jaxx	Southern League	Eddie Rodríguez
A	High Desert Mavericks	California League	Scott Steinmann
A	Wisconsin Timber Rattlers	Midwest League	Jim Horner
A-Short Season	Everett AquaSox	Northwest League	Mike Tosar
Rookie	AZL Mariners	Arizona League	José Moreno

League champions: AZL Mariners
