= Donnie Murphy =

American baseball player (born 1983)

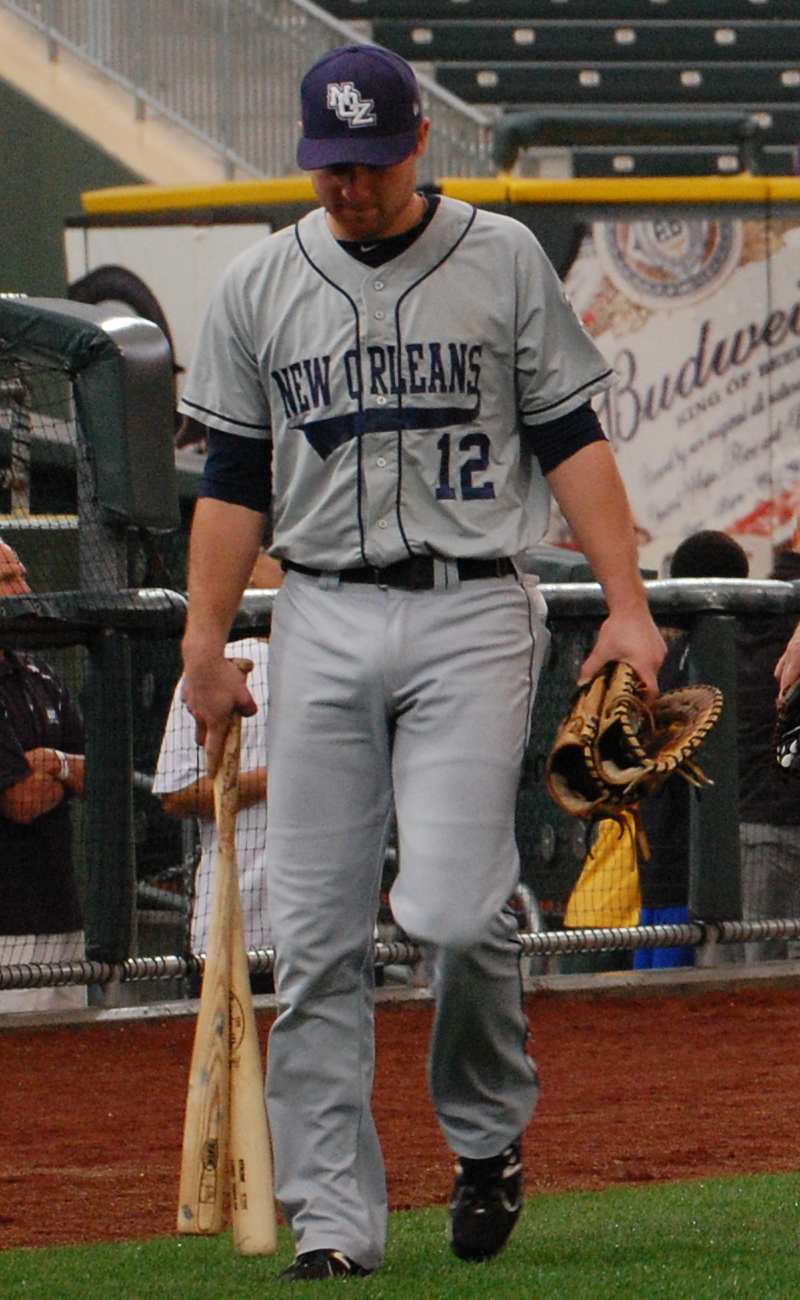
- Murphy with the New Orleans Zephyrs in 2012
- Infielder
- Born: March 10, 1983 (age 43); Lakewood, California, U.S.
- Batted: Right Threw: Right

MLB debut
- September 18, 2004, for the Kansas City Royals

Last MLB appearance
- July 4, 2014, for the Texas Rangers

MLB statistics
- Batting average: .212
- Home runs: 33
- Runs batted in: 119
- Stats at Baseball Reference

Teams
- Kansas City Royals (2004–2005); Oakland Athletics (2007–2008); Florida / Miami Marlins (2010–2012); Chicago Cubs (2013); Texas Rangers (2014)

Donald Rex Murphy (born March 10, 1983) is an American former professional baseball infielder. He attended Riverside Polytechnic High School and Orange Coast Community College in Costa Mesa, California, and was selected by the Kansas City Royals in the 5th round of the 2002 Major League Baseball draft.

He is currently the manager for the Class A-Advanced Dunedin Blue Jays, a position he was named to in 2020 after spending several years as a hitting coach in the Toronto Blue Jays organization.

== Playing career ==
=== Kansas City Royals ===
In 2004 and 2005, he appeared in 39 games for the Royals, hitting .163 with one home run and eleven RBI.

=== Oakland Athletics ===
Murphy was acquired by the Oakland Athletics in exchange for cash considerations on November 28, 2006.

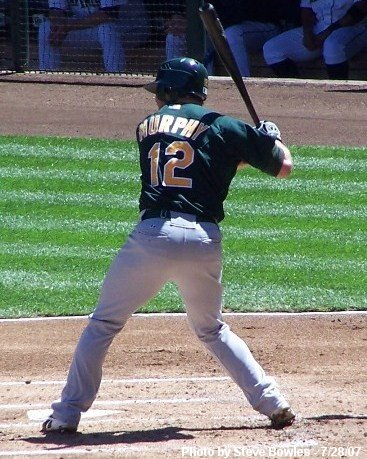
Murphy batting for the Oakland Athletics in 2007

He began the 2007 season at Sacramento, the A's Pacific Coast League Triple-A affiliate. He hit .342 for the River Cats and was recalled to Oakland June 8 when Milton Bradley was placed on the disabled list.

=== Baltimore Orioles ===
Murphy was signed by the Baltimore Orioles to a minor league deal with a spring training invitation for the 2009 season.

=== Florida/Miami Marlins ===
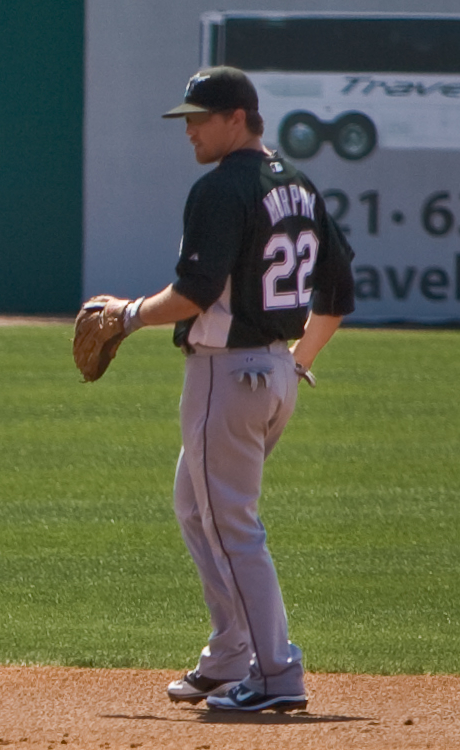
Murphy with the Florida Marlins in 2010

On December 14, 2009, Murphy signed a minor league contract with the Florida Marlins with an invitation to spring training. He was called up on July 3, 2010. He hit a walk-off home run to defeat the Colorado Rockies on July 19, 2010. It was the first walk-off home run by the Marlins that season. Continuing to play with the Marlins in a utility role, Murphy's season was cut short on September 1 when he dislocated his right wrist on a tough catch in the fourth inning. He had surgery the following day, ending one of his most successful seasons.

Murphy became a free agent on October 15 after refusing a minor league assignment. He was re-signed to a minor league contract on October 18.

In 2012, Murphy ended up on the 25-man roster for the Marlins going into opening day. On June 10, 2012, the Marlins designated Murphy for assignment to make room for Gaby Sánchez. He passed waivers and was sent to the New Orleans Zephyrs. On July 27, he was recalled by the Marlins after a trade sent Hanley Ramírez and Randy Choate to the Los Angeles Dodgers for Nathan Eovaldi and Scott McGough. On August 3, he pulled his left hamstring against the Washington Nationals. Five days later, he was placed on the 15-day DL. On August 19, he and Emilio Bonifacio were both reinstated. Murphy ended the year with three homers, six doubles, two triples, 12 RBIs, nine walks and one stolen base while batting .216 in 116 at-bats.

On October 18, 2012, Murphy was outrighted off the Marlins' 40-man roster and elected free agency.

=== Milwaukee Brewers ===
On December 17, 2012, Murphy signed a minor league contract with the Milwaukee Brewers. He was released on March 27, 2013.

=== Chicago Cubs ===
In April 2013, Murphy signed with the Chicago Cubs. Murphy hit a career-high 11 home runs in 2013 with Chicago, leading to him signing a one-year deal worth $825,000 with the Cubs after the season. Murphy also underwent surgery for a torn meniscus he had originally injured in 2009.

=== Texas Rangers ===
On March 26, 2014, Murphy was claimed off waivers from the Chicago Cubs by the Texas Rangers. He was designated for assignment on July 7. With the Rangers, he hit .196, with 4 homers, 14 RBIs, and 11 walks. He was released on July 9.

=== Cincinnati Reds ===
On July 18, Murphy was signed by the Cincinnati Reds and assigned to AAA Louisville. He was released in August.

=== Atlanta Braves ===
Murphy signed with Atlanta Braves on August 16, 2014.

=== Second stint with the Brewers ===
Murphy re-signed with the Milwaukee Brewers for the 2015 season and was assigned to AAA Colorado Springs Sky Sox. On August 2, 2015, Murphy was released by the Brewers.

== Coaching career ==
On February 23, 2016, the Toronto Blue Jays hired Murphy to be their new hitting coach for the Single-A Lansing Lugnuts for the 2016 season.

Murphy became the hitting coach for the High-A Dunedin Blue Jays on January 10, 2018.

After spending the 2019 season as the hitting coach for the Double-A New Hampshire Fisher Cats, Murphy was named the manager for Dunedin on January 31, 2020.

On March 9, 2021, Murphy was named the manager of the Vancouver Canadians for the 2021 season.

Murphy was named as the bench coach for the Buffalo Bisons the Triple-A affiliate for the 2024 season.
