= Lenny DiNardo =

American baseball player (born 1979)

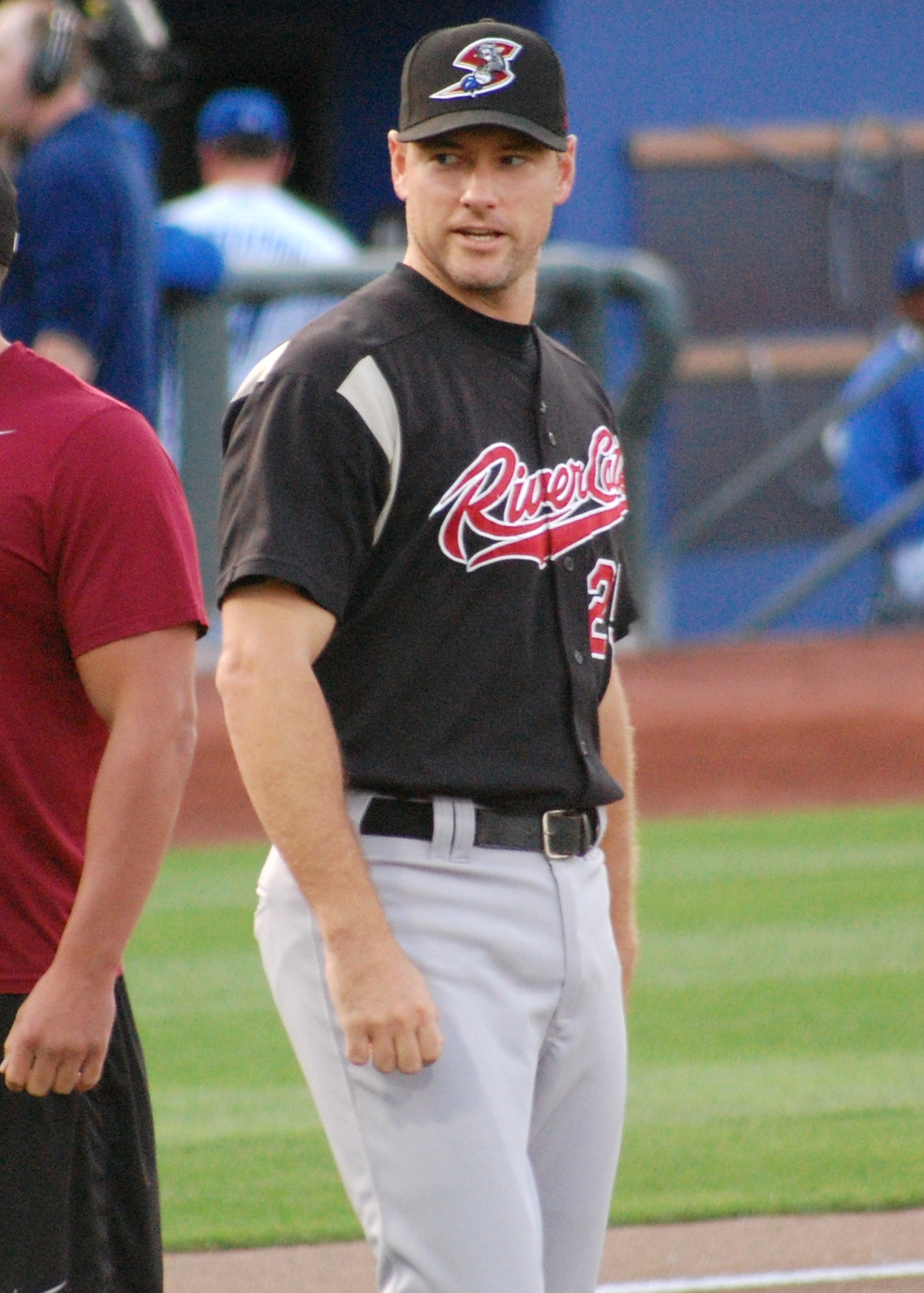
- DiNardo with the Sacramento River Cats in 2011
- Pitcher
- Born: September 19, 1979 (age 46); Miami, Florida, U.S.
- Batted: Left Threw: Left

Professional debut
- MLB: April 23, 2004, for the Boston Red Sox
- CPBL: March 20, 2012, for the Lamigo Monkeys

Last appearance
- MLB: October 2, 2009, for the Kansas City Royals
- CPBL: July 18, 2012, for the Lamigo Monkeys

MLB statistics
- Win–loss record: 10–18
- Earned run average: 5.36
- Strikeouts: 132

CPBL statistics
- Win–loss record: 3-6
- Earned run average: 4.50
- Strikeouts: 28
- Stats at Baseball Reference

Teams
- Boston Red Sox (2004–2006); Oakland Athletics (2007–2008); Kansas City Royals (2009); Lamigo Monkeys (2012)

Leonard Edward DiNardo (born September 19, 1979) is an American former professional baseball pitcher. He played in Major League Baseball (MLB) from 2004 through 2009, with the Boston Red Sox, Oakland Athletics, and Kansas City Royals. Listed at 6 feet 2 inches (1.88 m) and 220 pounds (100 kg), he both threw and batted left-handed.

== Early years ==
DiNardo graduated from Santa Fe High School in Alachua, Florida, in 1998. The Boston Red Sox selected DiNardo in the 10th round of the 1998 Major League Baseball draft, but he did not sign, opting to attend Stetson University instead.

== Professional career ==
=== Road to the majors ===
DiNardo was selected by the New York Mets in the third round of the 2001 MLB draft; he signed with the team in July 2001. In the summer of 2001, DiNardo made his professional debut with the Brooklyn Cyclones, the Mets' Single-A affiliate.

In 2002, DiNardo played for the Columbia Mets in the South Atlantic League, another Single-A farm team of the Mets. In 2003, he split time between the St. Lucie Mets (Single-A) and Binghamton Mets (Double-A). He pitched well enough to warrant being selected by the Boston Red Sox during the Rule 5 draft on December 15.

=== Boston Red Sox ===
As is the requirement with Rule 5 selections, DiNardo would remain on the Red Sox major league roster during the entire 2004 season. He began the season on the disabled list and made his major league debut on April 23 against the New York Yankees in Yankee Stadium, retiring the side in order in the ninth inning. DiNardo spent much of the second half of the season back on the disabled list. With the 2004 Boston Red Sox, DiNardo made 22 appearances (all in relief) compiling a 4.23 ERA in 27 2/3 innings pitched; he did not register a win or a loss. He received a World Series ring for his contributions to the 2004 World Series championship team.

Having satisfied the Rule 5 requirement of keeping DiNardo on the major league roster during 2004, the Red Sox sent the pitcher to the Triple-A Pawtucket Red Sox to start the 2005 season. He was recalled to the major league club five different times during the year. For the 2005 Boston Red Sox, DiNardo appeared in eight games (one start), compiling an 0–1 record with 1.84 ERA in 14 2/3 innings pitched.

In 2006, DiNardo made six starts in place of the injured David Wells. His first MLB win came on May 7, against the Baltimore Orioles. DiNardo spent a lot of time on the disabled list himself, due to a neck injury. With the 2006 Boston Red Sox, he appeared in 13 games (six starts), compiling a 1–2 record with 7.85 ERA in 39 innings pitched.

DiNardo played for Italy at the 2006 World Baseball Classic. To prepare for the 2007 MLB season, he played for the Peoria Javelinas of the Arizona Fall League.

=== Oakland Athletics ===
On February 14, 2007, the Oakland Athletics claimed DiNardo off waivers from the Boston Red Sox. With the 2007 Oakland Athletics, DiNardo made 20 starts and 15 relief appearances, logging 131 1/3 innings with an 8–10 record and a 4.11 ERA. During 2007, DiNardo had his first and only MLB hit, a single off of Matt Cain of the San Francisco Giants on June 10. For the 2008 Oakland Athletics, DiNardo made 11 appearances (two starts), compiling a 7.43 ERA with 1–2 record in 23 innings pitched.

=== Kansas City Royals ===
DiNardo signed a minor league contract with the Kansas City Royals on December 17, 2008. He spent the last month of the 2009 season in the major leagues; these would be his final MLB appearances. For the 2009 Kansas City Royals, DiNardo appeared in five games (all starts), compiling an 0–3 record with 10.12 ERA in 21 1/3 innings pitched.

DiNardo again represented Italy at the 2009 World Baseball Classic.

=== Oakland Athletics ===
On January 8, 2010, DiNardo signed a minor league contract to return to the Oakland Athletics; the deal included an invite to spring training. He played in the rookie-level Arizona League and for the Triple-A Sacramento River Cats, making 12 appearances (11 starts) with a 3.53 ERA and 2–5 record. He elected free agency following the season on November 6.

=== Boston Red Sox (second stint) ===
On December 16, 2010, DiNardo signed a minor league contract to return to the Boston Red Sox. He was released on March 29.

=== Long Island Ducks ===
On April 14, 2011, DiNardo signed with the Long Island Ducks of the independent Atlantic League of Professional Baseball. In 3 starts across 17.2 innings he went 2-1 with a 5.09 ERA with 17 strikeouts.

=== Oakland Athletics (second stint) ===
On May 21, 2011, DiNardo signed a minor league contract with the Oakland Athletics. He played for the Double-A Midland RockHounds and with Triple-A Sacramento, making 19 appearances (13 starts) with a 5.61 ERA and 4–7 record. He elected free agency following the season on November 2.

=== Lamigo Monkeys ===
On February 7, 2012, DiNardo signed with the Lamigo Monkeys of the Chinese Professional Baseball League. In 10 starts for the team, he compiled a 3–6 record and 4.50 ERA with 28 strikeouts across 58 innings pitched. He was released on May 25, 2012.

=== Lancaster Barnstormers ===
On April 8, 2013, DiNardo signed with the Lancaster Barnstormers of the Atlantic League of Professional Baseball. He went 5–9 with a 5.25 ERA in 20 games (19 starts). He tossed the franchise's first ever no-hitter on May 8, 2013, against the Long Island Ducks. He retired on August 20.

== Personal life ==
DiNardo previously lived in Miami and Micanopy, Florida. He has worked as a pitching instructor in Florida (Fort Myers and Naples) and in South Kingstown, Rhode Island. In 2017, he became a licensed realtor in Rhode Island. DiNardo plays guitar and has been a part of the annual Hot Stove Cool Music concert in Boston. Since 2017, he has worked as an in-studio baseball analyst with NESN.
