= Danny Putnam =

American baseball player (born 1982)

- Outfielder
- Born: September 17, 1982 (age 43); Scott Air Force Base, Illinois, U.S.
- Batted: Left Threw: Left

MLB debut
- April 23, 2007, for the Oakland Athletics

Last MLB appearance
- May 10, 2007, for the Oakland Athletics

MLB statistics
- Batting average: .214
- Home runs: 1
- Runs batted in: 2
- Stats at Baseball Reference

Teams
- Oakland Athletics (2007)
Medals
Men's baseball
Representing United States
Pan American Games
Silver medal – second place	2003 Santo Domingo	Team competition

Daniel Chris Putnam (born September 17, 1982) is an American former professional baseball outfielder. He played in Major League Baseball (MLB) for the Oakland Athletics.

== Career ==
=== Amateur ===
As a student at Rancho Bernardo High School in 2001, he was named the USA Today California High School Player of the Year. He attended Stanford University, and in 2002 he played collegiate summer baseball with the Hyannis Mets of the Cape Cod Baseball League where he was named a league all-star. He was selected by the A's in the first round of the 2004 MLB draft.

=== Oakland Athletics ===
He played parts of three seasons in the minors for the Athletics. In 2004 he played for the Low-A Vancouver Canadians and the Single-A Kane County Cougars. In 2005 he played for High-A Stockton Ports and in 2006 he played for Stockton and the Double-A Midland RockHounds. He was called up to the majors in April 2007. He made his major league debut on April 23, 2007 against the Baltimore Orioles, and got his first major league hit the same day. Putnam returned to the minors in May when Milton Bradley returned from an injury. May 10, would be his final major league appearance.

Putnam was designated for assignment on January 11, 2008, and started the year playing for their Triple-A affiliate, the Sacramento River Cats and would end up playing 89 games for Sacramento during the season. In 2009, Putnam played for Sacramento and Midland for the Athletics organization.

=== San Diego Padres ===
On July 8, 2009, Putnam was traded to the San Diego Padres as the player to be named later in the Chad Reineke trade that had occurred on April 2. He would finish the 2009 season with the Padres Triple-A affiliate, the Portland Beavers. Putnam was released by the Padres organization on March 25, 2010.

=== Bridgeport Bluefish ===
Following his release from the Padres, Putnam signed with the Bridgeport Bluefish of the independent Atlantic League for the 2010 season. He played in 108 games for Bridgeport, hitting .272/.367/.448 to go along with 11 homers and 56 runs batted in. In 2011 for the Bluefish, Putnam slashed .270/.331/.420 over 105 games. He became a free agent after the season.
