= Dan Meyer (pitcher) =

American baseball player & coach (born 1981)

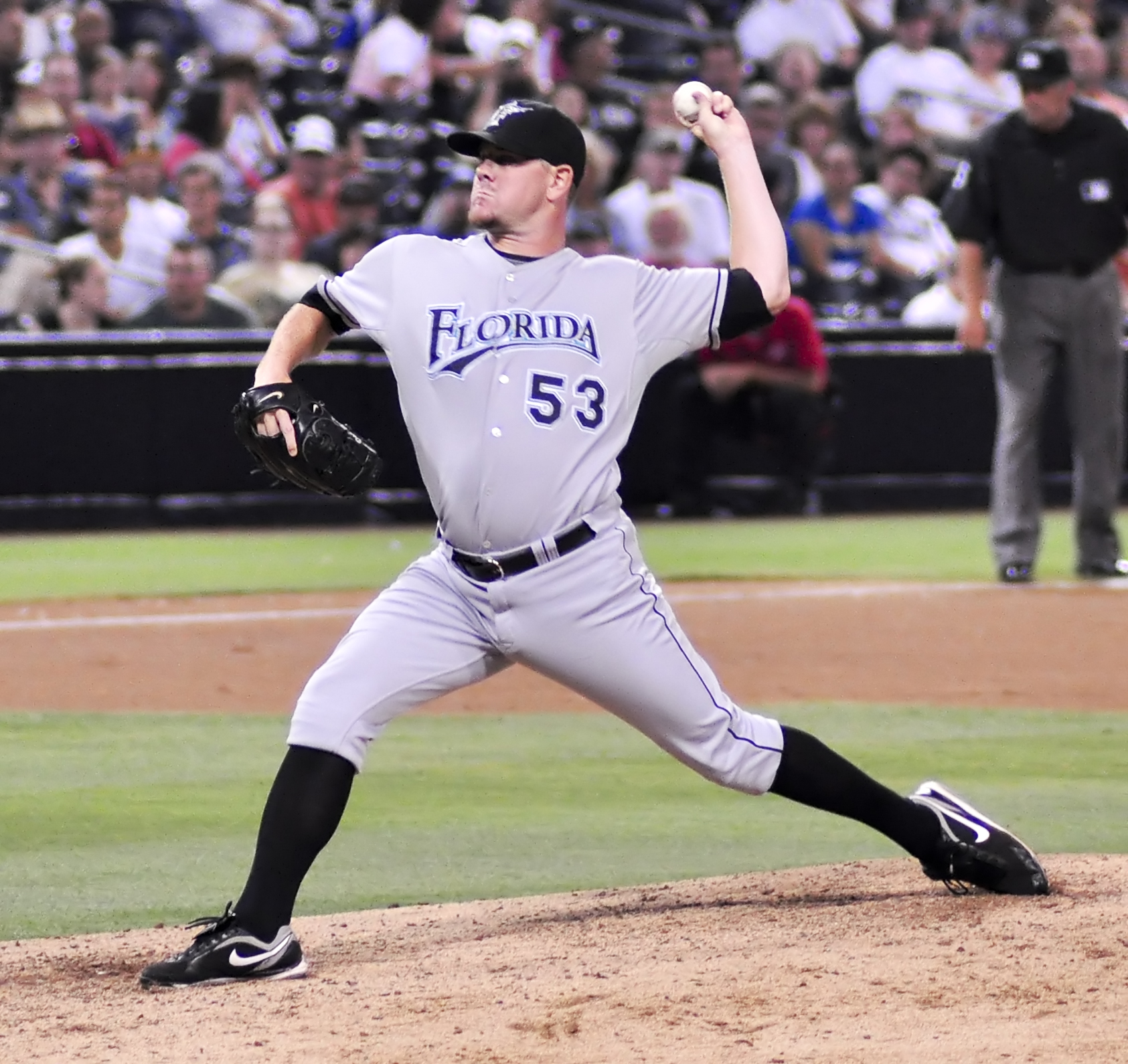
- Meyer with the Florida Marlins
- Pitcher
- Born: July 3, 1981 (age 45); Woodbury, New Jersey, U.S.
- Batted: Right Threw: Left

MLB debut
- September 14, 2004, for the Atlanta Braves

Last MLB appearance
- July 10, 2010, for the Florida Marlins

MLB statistics
- Win–loss record: 3–9
- Earned run average: 5.46
- Strikeouts: 92
- Stats at Baseball Reference

Teams
- Atlanta Braves (2004); Oakland Athletics (2007–2008); Florida Marlins (2009–2010)

Daniel Livingston Meyer (born July 3, 1981) is an American former professional baseball pitcher. He played in Major League Baseball (MLB) from 2004 to 2010 for the Atlanta Braves, Oakland Athletics, and Florida Marlins. Meyer's coaching career began in 2014, within the Braves organization. Prior to the 2022 season, he was hired by the Pittsburgh Pirates. In 2024, Meyer was hired by the Colorado Rockies organization.

== Amateur career ==
Meyer pitched for Kingsway Regional High School in Woolwich Township, New Jersey, with whom he reached the South Jersey Group II final in 1999.

He played college baseball at James Madison University in Harrisonburg, Virginia under head coach Spanky McFarland. In 2001, he played collegiate summer baseball with the Cotuit Kettleers of the Cape Cod Baseball League. Meyer was a member of the Dukes' 2002 NCAA tournament team. After going 9–2 with a 3.15 earned run average and ninety strikeouts in 97 innings that season, the touted prospect was drafted in the first round (34th overall) in the 2002 Major League Baseball draft by the Atlanta Braves.

== Playing career ==
=== Atlanta Braves ===
Used as a starter in the minor leagues, Meyer went 3–3 with a 2.74 ERA and 77 strikeouts in his first professional season with the Appalachian League's Danville Braves. Despite a losing record (7-10) in 2003 for the Rome Braves and Myrtle Beach Pelicans, Meyer posted a modest 2.87 ERA while striking out 158 batters in 160 innings pitched.

He began the 2004 season with the Double-A Greenville Braves and ended it with a September call up to Atlanta. Meyer appeared in two games for the Braves, both against the New York Mets. He faced a total of eight batters, allowing two hits and striking out one. At the 2004 Winter Meetings, Meyer was traded to the Oakland Athletics, along with pitcher Juan Cruz and outfielder Charles Thomas, for ace Tim Hudson.

=== Oakland Athletics ===
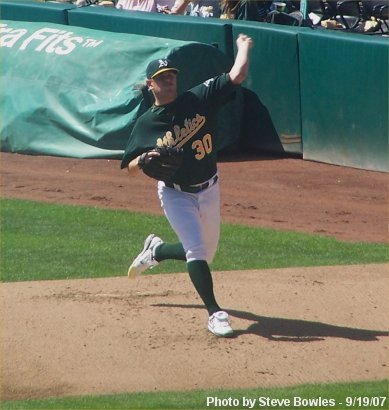
Meyer with the A's in 2007

After posting a 7.78 ERA in 6 games (4 starts) in Spring training 2005, Meyer was reassigned to the triple A Sacramento River Cats. For the first time in his minor league career, Meyer struggled in Sacramento. He led the River Cats pitching staff with eight losses (versus two wins) in nineteen games (17 starts), and landed on the disabled list twice with soreness in his pitching shoulder. His 5.36 ERA was a career high, as were his earned run (53), home run (15) and walk (43) totals. His strikeout numbers also declined from the days of being a prospect in the Atlanta Braves organization.

Meyer would spend most of his Oakland Athletics career in Sacramento, compiling a 23–18 record with a 4.40 ERA and 306 strikeouts in four seasons. During the 2006 season, he had season ending surgery in which bone chips were removed from his shoulder. He returned healthy in 2007, going 6–2 with a 3.40 ERA through the middle of August to earn his first call to the majors since joining his new organization. Making his first career start on August 17 at McAfee Coliseum, Meyer lasted just four innings against the Kansas City Royals, who fell a single short of hitting for the cycle in the first inning. All told, he walked two, allowed two home runs, two triples and uncorked a wild pitch for a total of six runs (3 earned) in picking up the loss.

He returned to Sacramento after the game, where he picked up two more wins with a 2.25 ERA before receiving his third call-up to the majors when rosters expanded in September. He pitched 12.1 innings that September, compiling a 9.49 ERA and one loss. He returned to the A's as a reliever in 2008, and was fairly effective in his first two appearances (4 strikeouts in 5 innings, no earned runs) before making a start. He lasted five innings and gave up three earned runs, all on solo home runs, to take the loss. From there, his season spiraled downward. He went 0–3 with a 10.19 ERA in eight games over the rest of the season.

=== Florida Marlins ===
Following the 2008 season, Meyer was claimed off waivers by the Florida Marlins. He earned a job in the Marlins bullpen for 2009, and soon emerged as one of manager Fredi González's top relievers. On June 12, Meyer earned his first major league win against the Toronto Blue Jays. Two weeks later, he earned his first career save against the Baltimore Orioles.

Through the All-Star break, Meyer was 2–0 with two saves and a 1.78 ERA, however, Meyer's success would be short lived. His ERA soared in the second half to 5.09. His 2010 season with the Marlins started out very badly, and continued to get worse as time went by. He was optioned down to the triple A New Orleans Zephyrs with a 10.80 ERA after his first twelve appearances. After working out mechanical issues, he returned to the big league club on July 9. He pitched one scoreless inning the following day before being shut down for the season with a calf injury.

=== Philadelphia Phillies ===
The Philadelphia Phillies signed Meyer to a Minor League contract with an invitation to spring training during the off-season. On March 18, 2011, he was reassigned to minor league camp. He requested his release on April 3, and signed with the Pittsburgh Pirates shortly afterwards.

Though Meyer's time with the Phillies was brief and included no regular season experience, it provided one of the more interesting footnotes to his career. Antonio Bastardo, with whom Meyer competed for a lefty spot in the Phillies bullpen that Spring, was suspended by Major League Baseball on August 5, 2014, for his connection to Biogenesis of America. The news prompted the following tweet from Meyer on Twitter:

Hey Antonio Bastardo, remember when we competed for a job in 2011. Thx a lot. #ahole

=== Pittsburgh Pirates ===
He pitched only 19 1/3 innings for the Pirates' triple A affiliate, the Indianapolis Indians with a 7.45 ERA before his season was cut short by a second shoulder surgery. He recovered from his surgery too late to try to catch on with a Major League team for 2012, so he joined the Atlantic League's Long Island Ducks midway through the season. He appeared in eighteen games for the Ducks, and was 2–6 with a 7.02 ERA.

=== Baltimore Orioles ===
On November 13, 2012, Meyer signed a minor league contract with the Baltimore Orioles organization. He did not pitch at all in 2013 after failing to make the team in Spring training.

== Coaching career ==
=== Atlanta Braves ===
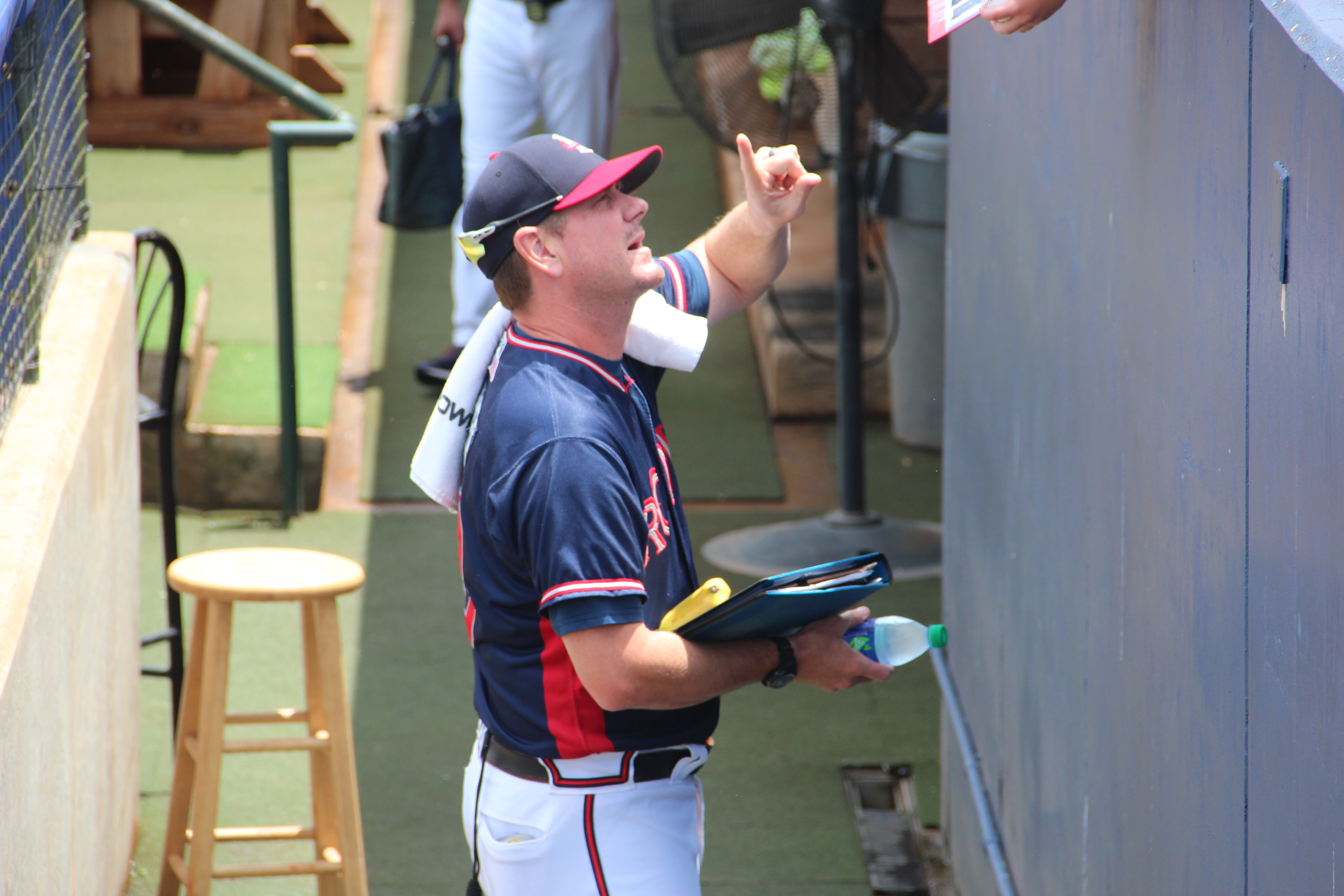
Meyer with the Rome Braves, 2018

Meyer returned to the Atlanta Braves organization and began his coaching career with the Danville Braves in 2014. In March 2015, Meyer became a minor league pitching rehabilitation coordinator for the Braves system. Meyer was named as the pitching coach for the Rome Braves for the 2016 season, and held the position through the 2018 season. Meyer was named as the pitching coach for the Florida Fire Frogs for the 2019 season. Meyer was later named as the pitching coach for the Mississippi Braves for the 2021 season. In May 2021, Meyer was named the interim manager for Mississippi. At season's end, Meyer was named the Double-A South Manager of the Year.

=== Pittsburgh Pirates ===
In January 2022, Meyer was named pitching coach for the Pittsburgh Pirates' Triple-A affiliate Indianapolis Indians.

=== Colorado Rockies ===
Meyer was named pitching coach for the Hartford Yard Goats the Double-A affiliate of the Colorado Rockies for the 2024 season.

== Personal life ==
Meyer was inducted into the South Jersey Hall of Fame in November 2018.
