= A. J. Murray (baseball) =

American baseball player (born 1982)

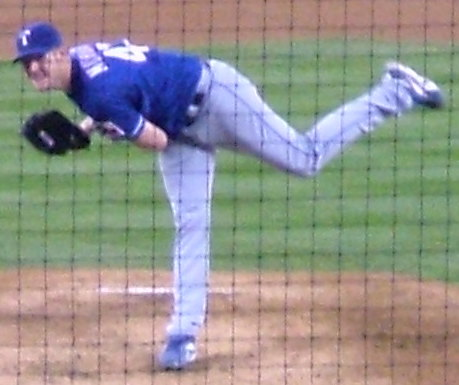
- Murray with the Rangers in 2007
- Pitcher
- Born: March 17, 1982 (age 44); Vernal, Utah
- Batted: Switch Threw: Left

MLB debut
- May 16, 2007, for the Texas Rangers

Last MLB appearance
- June 3, 2008, for the Texas Rangers

MLB statistics
- Win–loss record: 2–2
- Earned run average: 4.29
- Strikeouts: 23
- Stats at Baseball Reference

Teams
- Texas Rangers (2007–2008)

Arlington John "A. J." Murray (born March 17, 1982) is an American former professional baseball pitcher. He played in Major League Baseball (MLB) for the Texas Rangers.

== Career ==
On July 28, 2005, together with Scott Feldman and Steve Karsay, he threw a perfect game against the Corpus Christi Hooks. It was the first combined nine-inning perfect game in Texas League history, and the third overall.

Murray was recalled from the minor leagues by the Rangers on May 15, 2007, and made his major league debut against the Tampa Bay Devil Rays on May 16. He struck out Ty Wigginton swinging for his first major league strikeout. He was outrighted to the minors on October 1, 2008.

On December 15, 2009, Murray signed a minor league contract with the Milwaukee Brewers and also received an invitation to Spring Training. He was assigned to the Triple-A Nashville Sounds for the 2010 season, but was released on June 22, 2010. Murray signed with the York Revolution of the independent Atlantic League on July 19, 2010.
