= Andrew Brown (pitcher) =

American baseball player (born 1981)

- Relief pitcher
- Born: February 17, 1981 (age 45); Chardon, Ohio, U.S.
- Batted: Right Threw: Right

MLB debut
- August 13, 2006, for the Cleveland Indians

Last MLB appearance
- July 25, 2008, for the Oakland Athletics

MLB statistics
- Win–loss record: 4–3
- Earned run average: 3.84
- Strikeouts: 78
- Stats at Baseball Reference

Teams
- Cleveland Indians (2006); Oakland Athletics (2007–2008)

Andrew Aaron Brown (born February 17, 1981) is an American former professional baseball relief pitcher. He has played parts of three seasons in Major League Baseball for the Cleveland Indians and Oakland Athletics.

Brown was originally drafted by the Atlanta Braves in the sixth round of the 1999 Major League Baseball draft. He was traded by Atlanta to the Los Angeles Dodgers on January 15, 2002, in a deal for Gary Sheffield; and from Los Angeles to Cleveland on May 19, 2004, as the player to be named from an earlier deal for Milton Bradley.

In 2005, he appeared on the Indians roster for two different stints but never appeared in a game. In 2006, while with the Buffalo Bisons, he was called up to the Cleveland Indians on August 13.

On November 8, 2006, he was traded from Cleveland to the San Diego Padres along with third baseman Kevin Kouzmanoff in exchange for second baseman Josh Barfield. On June 28, 2007, Brown was traded to the Oakland Athletics, once again for Milton Bradley.

On January 29, 2009, Brown was released to clear a roster spot for Russ Springer. On April 28, 2009, Brown signed back with the Oakland Athletics on a minor league deal, but did not pitch in their organization before becoming a free agent at the end of the season. He signed with the Washington Nationals as a minor league free agent before the 2010 season, then was traded to the St. Louis Cardinals on May 24. The Cardinals released him on August 19.
