= Joe Blanton =

American baseball player (born 1980)

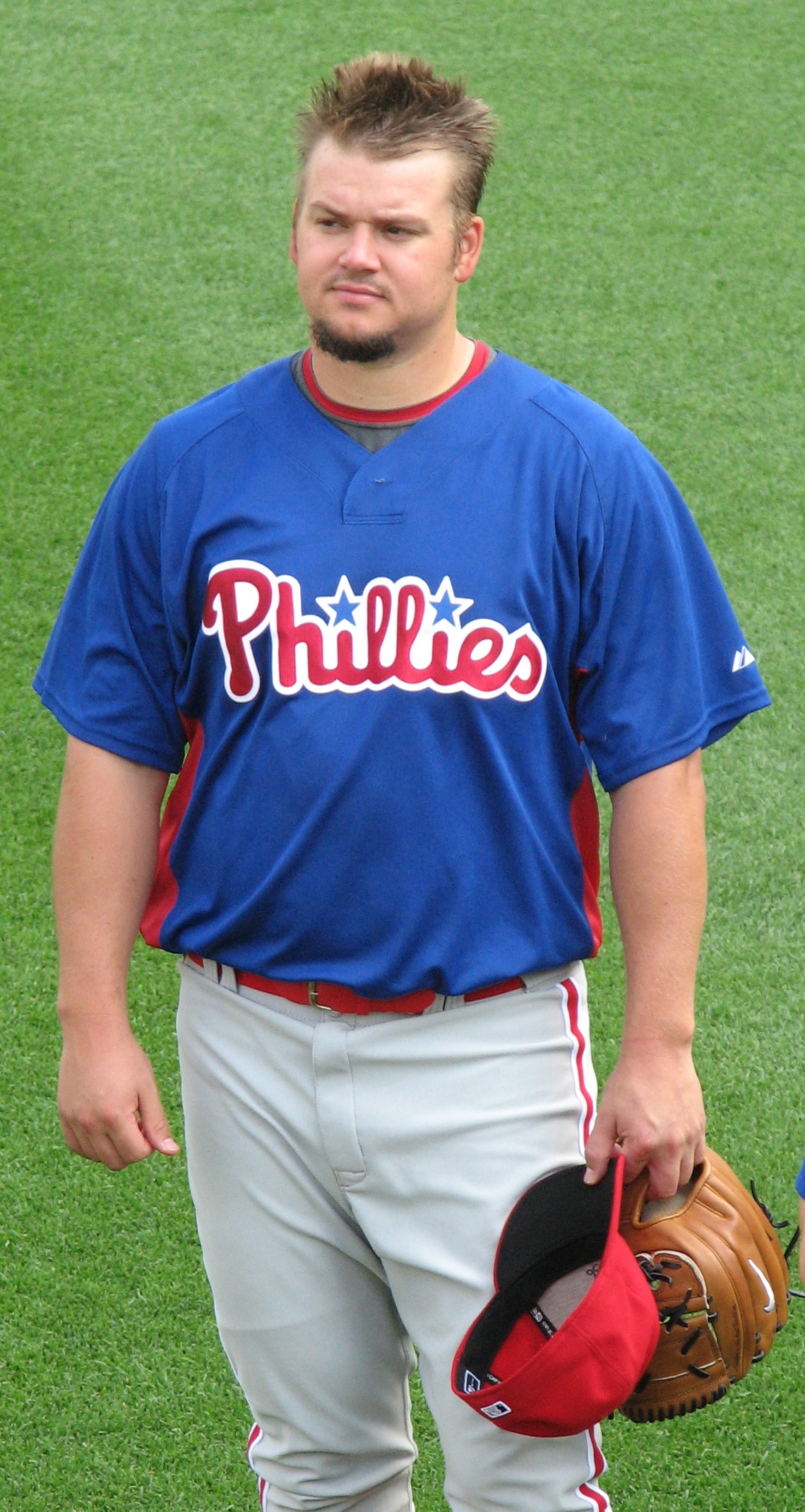
- Blanton with the Philadelphia Phillies
- Pitcher
- Born: December 11, 1980 (age 45); Nashville, Tennessee, U.S.
- Batted: Right Threw: Right

MLB debut
- September 21, 2004, for the Oakland Athletics

Last MLB appearance
- October 1, 2017, for the Washington Nationals

MLB statistics
- Win–loss record: 101–97
- Earned run average: 4.38
- Strikeouts: 1,284
- Stats at Baseball Reference

Teams
- Oakland Athletics (2004–2008); Philadelphia Phillies (2008–2012); Los Angeles Dodgers (2012); Los Angeles Angels of Anaheim (2013); Kansas City Royals (2015); Pittsburgh Pirates (2015); Los Angeles Dodgers (2016); Washington Nationals (2017)

Career highlights and awards
- World Series champion (2008)

Joseph Matthew Blanton (born December 11, 1980) is an American former professional baseball pitcher, who played in Major League Baseball (MLB) for the Oakland Athletics, Philadelphia Phillies, Los Angeles Angels of Anaheim, Kansas City Royals, Pittsburgh Pirates, Los Angeles Dodgers, and Washington Nationals.

After playing college baseball for the University of Kentucky, the Athletics selected him in the 2002 MLB draft and later made his MLB debut in 2004. While pitching for the Phillies, he was a member of the 2008 World Series championship team. Blanton continued to pitch in MLB through 2013, when he retired in 2014. Blanton returned from retirement to pitch in MLB from 2015 through 2017.

== Amateur career ==
Joe Blanton was born in Nashville, Tennessee, but grew up in Chalybeate, Kentucky. He graduated from Franklin-Simpson High School in 1999. He attended the University of Kentucky and played college baseball for the Kentucky Wildcats, with a 13–12 record from 2000 to 2002, and led the Southeastern Conference with 133 strikeouts in his final season, finishing with a 4.59 earned run average (ERA). In 2001 he played collegiate summer baseball in the Cape Cod Baseball League for the Bourne Braves.

== Professional career ==
=== Minor leagues ===
The Oakland Athletics selected Blanton in the first round of the 2002 Major League Baseball draft using a compensation pick from the New York Yankees for the signing of free agent Jason Giambi. This draft was chronicled by Michael Lewis in his book, Moneyball. In 2003, while pitching for the Kane County Cougars and the Midland RockHounds, Blanton ranked second in all of Minor League Baseball with a combined 174 strikeouts. The next season, he helped the Triple-A Sacramento River Cats win the Pacific Coast League Championship with an 11–8 record and a 4.19 ERA. He struck out 143 batters in 176 innings, tossing one complete game in 26 starts.

=== Oakland Athletics ===
Blanton made his major league debut on September 21, 2004, against the Texas Rangers. He made three appearances and pitched eight innings. He posted a 5.63 ERA and did not get a decision in any of his games.

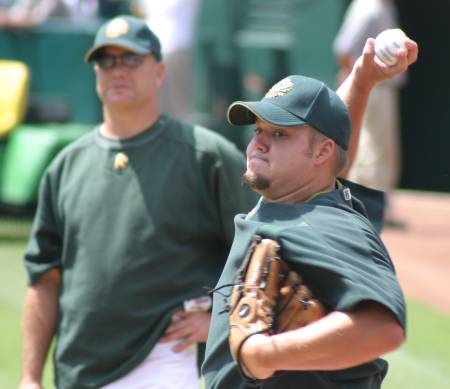
Blanton with the Athletics

In 2005, Blanton joined the starting rotation that had lost pitchers Mark Mulder and Tim Hudson to trades. He made his first start on April 8 against the Tampa Bay Devil Rays, pitching five innings and allowing two runs. After losing his first five decisions, he picked up his first win when he worked seven innings against the Toronto Blue Jays on June 4. Blanton was third on the team in innings pitched, but still exceeded 200 innings in his first full season. He posted a 12–12 record with a 3.53 ERA in 33 starts, and his 33 starts set an Oakland rookie record for most games started which had broken the previous mark of 32 set by Matt Keough in 1978. His ERA was best among all rookies with 100 or more innings pitched. He also tied the Oakland rookie record for most wins in a season with 12. His first career complete game came in a 1–0 loss to the Los Angeles Angels of Anaheim on April 24, 2005; he was the only rookie to post two complete games in 2005. Blanton's high loss total was attributed to poor run support, as the A's only posted six runs total in all twelve of his losses combined, while posting 62 runs in his 12 wins. Blanton was also named the American League Rookie of the Month for June, as he tied with teammate Dan Haren for the AL lead in wins and finished third in ERA in June.

In 2006, Blanton's ERA rose over a full point to 4.82 and gave up the fifth highest number of hits in the American League (241), resulting in a .309 batting average against. However, he had four more wins than the previous year, posting a 16–12 record, striking out 107 batters and walking 58. He pitched his first career complete game shutout against the Kansas City Royals on May 31. Blanton did not pitch in the ALDS for the Athletics, but was named to the roster for the ALCS, where he pitched two innings in one appearance, allowing no hits or runs.

Blanton had a 14–10 record in 230 innings pitched in 2007. He struck out 140 batters, walked 40, and gave up 101 earned runs, resulting in a 3.95 ERA for the year. Though Blanton's road and home records were the same (7–5), his home ERA was 2.69 compared with 5.11 on the road. He also pitched three complete games in 2007, but his first one of the season was his third career complete-game loss, on April 25. Blanton made his 100th career appearance at the end of the season, in a 7–3 win against the Texas Rangers on September 15.

The A's traded Blanton, who had a 5–12 record and a 4.96 ERA to the Philadelphia Phillies for second baseman Adrian Cárdenas, pitcher Josh Outman, and outfielder Matthew Spencer on July 17, 2008.

=== Philadelphia Phillies ===
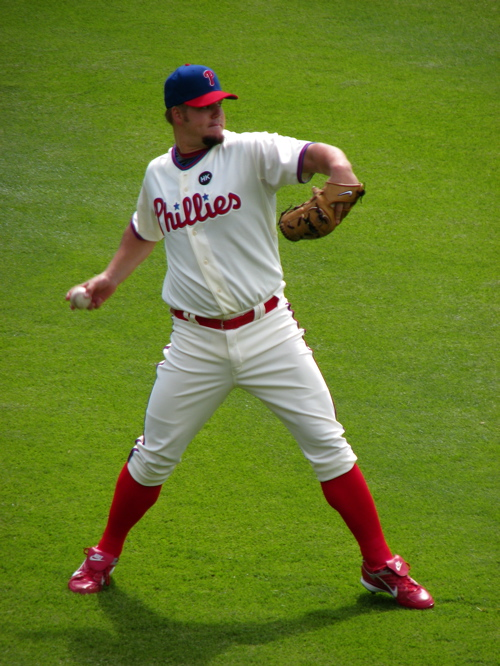
Blanton with the Philadelphia Phillies in 2011

In Blanton's first start for the Phillies, he pitched six innings and allowed five runs; however, he did not factor in the decision as the Phillies scored six runs off the New York Mets' bullpen in the ninth inning to win. On August 2, Blanton recorded his first win as a Phillie against the St. Louis Cardinals by a score of 2–1 in his third Phillies start. For the season, 51% of his strikeouts were "looking", the highest percentage in the majors.

In Game 4 of the 2008 World Series, Blanton hit his first major league home run to become the 13th pitcher overall and first since Ken Holtzman in 1974 to hit a home run in a World Series game. He was also credited with the win in the Phillies' Game 4 victory over the Tampa Bay Rays, pitching six innings and allowing two runs on four hits. On January 21, 2010, the Phillies announced Blanton agreed to a three-year extension worth $24 million.

=== Los Angeles Dodgers ===
On August 3, 2012, Blanton was traded to the Los Angeles Dodgers for a player to be named later (minor league prospect Ryan O'Sullivan). He started 10 games for the Dodgers and was 2–4 with a 4.99 ERA. He became a free agent following the season.

=== Los Angeles Angels of Anaheim ===
In December 2012, Blanton signed a two-year contract worth $15 million with the Los Angeles Angels of Anaheim. Blanton would go on to finish the 2013 season with a disappointing 2–14 record and a 6.04 ERA. Most of his struggles were attributed to the home run ball, giving up 29 in 132.2 innings. On March 26, 2014, Blanton was granted his unconditional release from the Angels.

=== Second stint with the Oakland Athletics ===
On March 31, 2014, the Oakland Athletics signed Blanton to a minor league deal and sent him to the Triple-A Sacramento River Cats. He made two starts in the minors and then on April 13, 2014, Blanton announced his retirement from baseball.

After working out in the offseason with Gallatin, Tennessee, neighbor and fellow pitcher Zach Duke, Blanton announced that he would attempt a comeback for the 2015 season. He pitched in a pro day at Volunteer State Community College in Gallatin to demonstrate his pitching for potential major league clubs.

=== Kansas City Royals ===
On February 13, 2015, Blanton signed a minor league contract with the Kansas City Royals. Blanton would earn $1 million at the major league level with up to $3 million in incentives. The contract contained an invitation to spring training, and two opt-out clauses on April 1 and May 15. He had his contract selected to the major league roster on May 16, where he debuted against the Yankees, pitching four innings of relief with one earned run in a 5–1 loss. On July 28, Blanton was designated for assignment to make room for Johnny Cueto. Despite the fact that he was traded before the Royals' World Series run that year, he still received a World Series ring, the second of his career.

=== Pittsburgh Pirates ===
On July 29, 2015, Blanton was traded to the Pittsburgh Pirates for cash considerations. Blanton appeared in 21 games, going 5–0 with a 1.57 ERA. He struck out 39 batters in 34 1/3 innings pitched. He became a free agent following the season.

=== Second stint with Los Angeles Dodgers ===
On January 19, 2016, Blanton signed a one-year, $4 million contract to return to the Dodgers. He became the Dodgers primary setup man, appearing in 75 games with a 7–2 record and a 2.48 ERA in 80 innings. He pitched five scoreless innings in the 2016 National League Division Series against the Washington Nationals but struggled in the 2016 National League Championship Series against the Chicago Cubs, allowing seven earned runs in only three innings of work to be credited with the loss in two games. He became a free agent following the season.

=== Washington Nationals ===
On March 2, 2017, Blanton signed a one-year, $4 million contract with the Washington Nationals. He was put on the 10-day disabled list on May 17 with right shoulder inflammation and reactivated June 11. Both before and after his stint on the disabled list, Blanton struggled with a significant increase in his rate of home runs given up. He finished the 2017 season with a 2–4 record and a 5.68 ERA in 44 1/3 innings across 51 appearances, all in relief. Blanton retired following the 2017 season.

== Personal life ==
Blanton and his wife, LeeAndra, have three children and live in St. Helena, California, where they own a 3-acre (1.2 ha) vineyard on Howell Mountain producing cabernet sauvignon.

== Scouting ==
Blanton threw a low-90's fastball, along with a 12–6 curveball, a slider, and a straight changeup. His curveball was his best secondary pitch, drawing comparisons to former teammate Barry Zito's 12–6 curve.
