= Ruddy Lugo =

Dominican baseball player (born 1980)

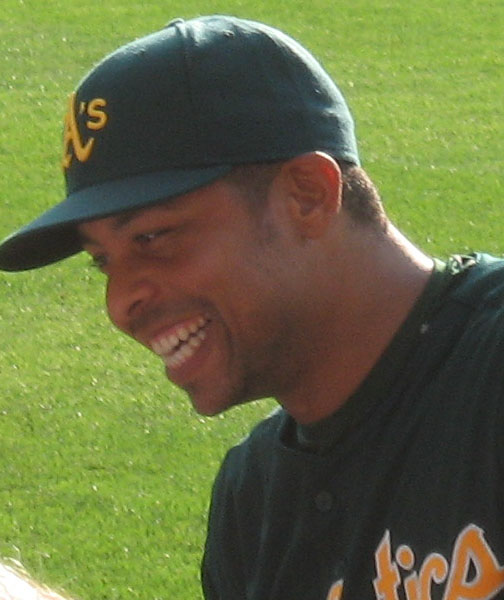
- Pitcher
- Born: May 22, 1980 (age 46); Barahona, Dominican Republic
- Batted: Switch Threw: Right

MLB debut
- April 30, 2006, for the Tampa Bay Devil Rays

Last MLB appearance
- September 29, 2007, for the Oakland Athletics

MLB statistics
- Win–loss record: 8–4
- Earned run average: 4.39
- Strikeouts: 82
- Stats at Baseball Reference

Teams
- Tampa Bay Devil Rays (2006–2007); Oakland Athletics (2007)

Ruddy Joraider Lugo (born May 22, 1980) is a Dominican-American former professional baseball relief pitcher. He played in Major League Baseball (MLB) for the Tampa Bay Devil Rays and Oakland Athletics. Julio Lugo, who played in MLB for 12 seasons as a shortstop, was his older brother.

== Career ==
He attended Xaverian High School in Brooklyn, New York.

Lugo was born in Barahona, Dominican Republic, and was drafted by the Milwaukee Brewers in the third round of the 1999 Major League Baseball draft. During spring training 2005, he was signed by the Tampa Bay Devil Rays. He then started the season with the Single-A Visalia Oaks and finished it with the Double-A Montgomery Biscuits. In 2006, he was called up to the Devil Rays and made his debut on April 3 against the Baltimore Orioles. In June 2007, the Oakland Athletics claimed him off waivers.

In January 2008, Lugo was claimed off waivers by the New York Mets. In August, Lugo was promoted to the Majors due to injuries to John Maine and Billy Wagner. After being a starter for the New Orleans Zephyrs in Triple-A, Lugo was placed in the bullpen for the Mets. However, he was optioned a few days afterward without getting into a game. He became a free agent at the end of the season and signed a minor-league contract with the Detroit Tigers.

Lugo was released by the Toledo Mud Hens in July 2010. He then spent the 2011 season with the independent Atlantic League Long Island Ducks as a starting pitcher. On July 4, 2013, he joined the Bridgeport Bluefish as a relief pitcher, and pitched in 25 games for the team that season.
