= Milton Bradley (baseball) =

American baseball player (born 1978)

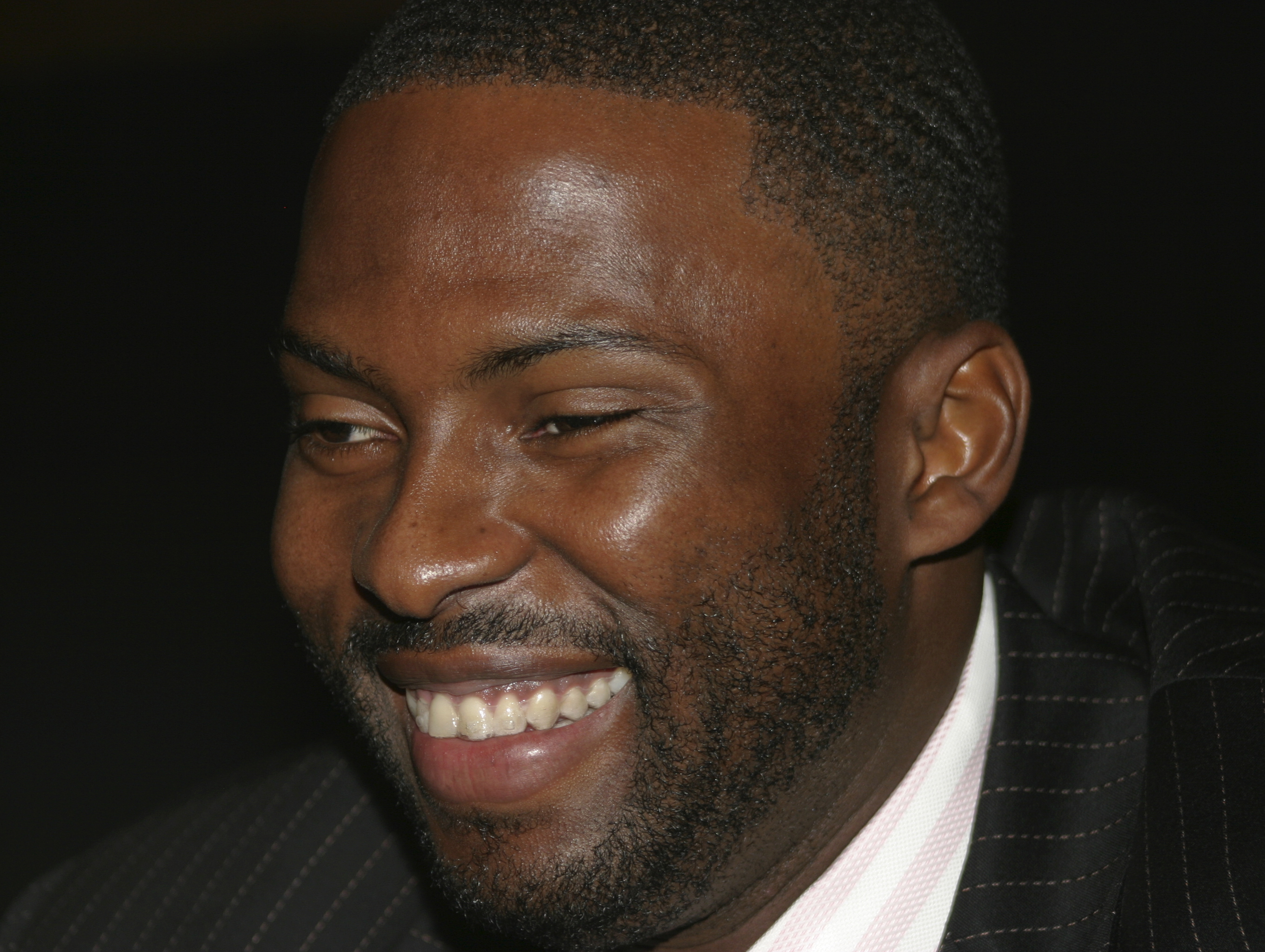
- Bradley at the 2008 Major League Baseball All-Star Game
- Outfielder
- Born: April 15, 1978 (age 48); Harbor City, California, U.S.
- Batted: Switch Threw: Right

MLB debut
- July 19, 2000, for the Montreal Expos

Last MLB appearance
- May 8, 2011, for the Seattle Mariners

MLB statistics
- Batting average: .271
- Home runs: 125
- Runs batted in: 481
- Stats at Baseball Reference

Teams
- Montreal Expos (2000–2001); Cleveland Indians (2001–2003); Los Angeles Dodgers (2004–2005); Oakland Athletics (2006–2007); San Diego Padres (2007); Texas Rangers (2008); Chicago Cubs (2009); Seattle Mariners (2010–2011)

Career highlights and awards
- All-Star (2008)
Medals
Men's baseball
Representing United States
Pan American Games
Silver medal – second place	1999 Winnipeg	Team

Milton Obelle Bradley Jr. (born April 15, 1978) is an American former professional baseball player. Standing 6 feet (1.8 m) and weighing 215 pounds (98 kg), Bradley was an outfielder and a switch hitter who threw right-handed. During an 11-year career in Major League Baseball (MLB), Bradley played with the Montreal Expos (2000–01), Cleveland Indians (2001–03), Los Angeles Dodgers (2004–05), Oakland Athletics (2006–07), San Diego Padres (2007), Texas Rangers (2008), Chicago Cubs (2009), and Seattle Mariners (2010–11). His career was also marred by legal troubles and several notable on-field incidents.

Born in Harbor City, California, Bradley attended Long Beach Polytechnic High School before he was drafted by the Expos in the 1996 Major League Baseball draft. After playing four seasons of minor league baseball for the organization, he made his major league debut on July 19, 2000. In 2001, Bradley was traded to the Cleveland Indians in exchange for pitching prospect Zach Day; he was again traded in 2004 to the Los Angeles Dodgers. After playing in 216 games for the Dodgers, the most among all teams he has played for, Bradley was traded to the Oakland Athletics for Andre Ethier. Bradley was traded to the Padres in 2007, was granted free agency after one season with the team, and signed with the Texas Rangers in 2007. He was voted to the 2008 Major League Baseball All-Star Game with the Rangers, and led the American League with a .436 on-base percentage and a .999 on-base plus slugging percentage. For the year, Bradley finished 17th in American League Most Valuable Player Award voting.

After becoming a free agent, Bradley signed with the Chicago Cubs in January 2009, who traded him in December of that year to the Seattle Mariners. In Seattle, Bradley batted .205 in 2010 and .218 in 2011 before he was released by the club. He has a career batting average of .271 with 135 home runs and 481 runs batted in (RBIs) in 1,042 games played, and was described as having "power, speed, a strong arm and star qualities", although "his temper … has never allowed him to fulfill his immense potential."

In 2013, Bradley was convicted by a jury of nine counts of physically attacking and threatening his wife including four counts of spousal battery, two counts of criminal threats, one count of assault with a deadly weapon, one count of vandalism and one count of brandishing a deadly weapon, and was sentenced to 32 months in prison.

== Early life ==
Bradley was born on April 15, 1978, in Harbor City, California. His mother, Charlena Rector, worked as a clerk at a local Safeway supermarket, while his father, Milton Bradley Sr., was a veteran of the Vietnam War, and was awarded a Purple Heart for his service. Bradley was named Milton Bradley Jr. when Milton Bradley Sr. filled out his son's birth certificate without Rector's permission. According to Bradley Jr.'s mother, Bradley Sr. was addicted to cocaine, physically abused her, and was homeless for several years. Growing up, Bradley had four half-siblings from Rector's previous marriage.

Bradley played baseball at Long Beach Polytechnic High School, and was a teammate of Chase Utley. After graduating high school with a 3.7 grade point average, he committed to California State University, Long Beach, but instead signed with the Expos on July 1, 1996, after being drafted by the team in the second round of the 1996 Major League Baseball June amateur draft.

== Major League Baseball career ==
=== Montreal Expos (1996–2001) ===
Bradley began his professional baseball career with the GCL Expos of the Gulf Coast League in 1996; in 32 games, he batted .241 with 27 hits. The following season, he played nine games for the GCL Expos and 50 for the Vermont Expos, a short season affiliate of the Montreal Expos. For Vermont, he was named to the postseason New York–Penn League All-Star team. In 1998, he played for the Cape Fear Crocs and the Jupiter Hammerheads, tying for the Croc team lead in doubles with 21 while hitting .302 for the Crocs and .287 for the Hammerheads. While playing for the Harrisburg Senators the next season, he was suspended seven games for starting a fight after he had been hit by a pitch. He also played for the silver medal-winning United States in the 1999 Pan American Games.

Finishing 76–66, the Senators played the Norwich Navigators for the Eastern League championship. The series was tied two games to two in a best-of-five series. In the final game, Bradley hit a walk-off grand slam with two outs and a full count, in the bottom of the ninth inning, to give the Senators a 12–11 win. During the next season, after playing in 88 games for the Ottawa Lynx, he was promoted to the major league club and made his MLB debut on July 19, 2000. In his debut, he hit three straight singles against the New York Mets; and for the season, he batted .221 with 15 RBIs over 42 games played.

For the 2001 Expos, Bradley played 67 games, including one on April 26 in which he walked to give the Expos the go-ahead run against Rick Ankiel of the St. Louis Cardinals in the top of the 15th inning. On July 31 of that year, he was traded to the Cleveland Indians to serve as a possible replacement for Kenny Lofton; in exchange, the Expos received right-handed pitcher Zach Day. Speaking to the Associated Press about the trade, Indians General Manager John Hart stated:

In Milton Bradley we are getting a top-of-the-order, middle-of-the-diamond player we feel will have a major impact at the major-league level in the near future.

=== Cleveland Indians (2001–2003) ===
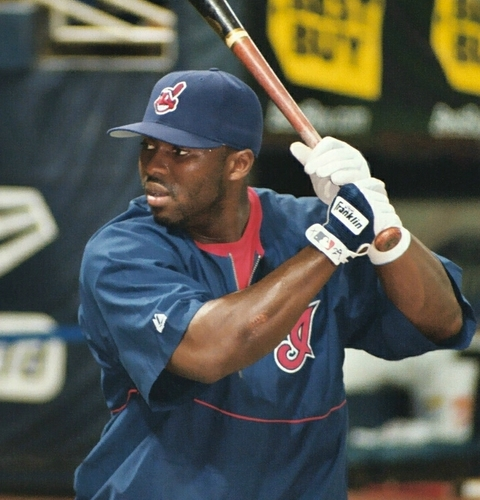
Bradley as a Cleveland Indian

After the deal, Bradley was assigned to the Triple-A Buffalo Bisons and reported to the team on August 2. In addition to the 30 games he played for the Bisons, he also played 10 games for the major league Indians.

On April 15, 2002, he was placed on the disabled list (DL) following an appendectomy a day earlier at St. Anthony's Hospital in St. Petersburg, Florida. He went on the disabled list again on May 2 with a broken orbital bone and a scratched iris after a batted ball had bounced off the outfield wall and hit him below his left eye while he was trying to make a catch; up to that point, he was hitting .266 in 23 games. After a rehabilitation stint of six games with the Bisons, he was reactivated by the Indians on June 4 and finished the season with a .249 batting average, 38 RBIs and nine home runs.

Bradley spent the 2003 campaign with the Indians. Despite being placed on the 15-day DL with a strained right hamstring and missing the final six weeks of the season with a lower back injury, he led the team in stolen bases, with 17. On August 30, while on the DL with a back injury, he was ticketed for speeding in Cuyahoga Falls, Ohio. After being stopped, he refused the ticket and sped away. He pleaded not guilty to speeding and fleeing charges on September 12, but was sentenced to a three-day jail term. The ruling was upheld by the Supreme Court of Ohio in December 2004.

On November 19, 2003, he signed a one-year, $1.73 million contract with the Indians for the Indians to avoid salary arbitration with him. During 2004 spring training, manager Eric Wedge pulled Bradley from a game for not running out a popup He was subsequently banned from training camp, and the Indians decided to trade him as soon as possible. On April 3, 2004, he was traded to the Dodgers for Franklin Gutiérrez and a player to be named later (Andrew Brown); the Akron Beacon Journal later reported that Wedge had insisted that Bradley be traded.

=== Los Angeles Dodgers (2004–2005) ===
When we traded for Milton, I think we knew everything that came along with it. We knew the past, we don't necessarily think that everything's going to be completely different because he came to a different place. That's fine. I would take nine Milton Bradleys if I could get them.

— Dodgers general manager Paul DePodesta

In his first game with the Dodgers, playing center field, Bradley went 2-for-3, with two singles and two walks. On June 1, he was ejected from a game by home plate umpire Terry Craft for arguing over balls and strikes. After being restrained by manager Jim Tracy, he returned to the dugout and threw a ball bag onto the field. Bradley was suspended for four games and Tracy for one game. On September 19, he hit a 479-foot home run against the Colorado Rockies in Coors Field. On September 28, during a home game against the Rockies, Bradley mishandled a line drive and was charged with an error. A fan threw a bottle at Bradley, who left his position in right field, picked up the bottle and threw it into the stands, yelling at the fan. Bradley was immediately ejected from the game. The next day, MLB suspended him for the remainder of the season and fined him an undisclosed amount. In postseason play, he hit .273 with a home run while the Dodgers lost the National League Division Series to the St. Louis Cardinals three games to one. He finished the 2004 season batting .267 with 19 home runs and 67 RBIs, but was caught stealing 11 times, tying for eighth most in MLB.

During the offseason, Bradley went through anger management counseling. In a game against the San Francisco Giants on April 12, 2005, he drove in two runs with a single to tie the game in the bottom of the ninth inning with two outs, the winning run then scoring on Jason Ellison's error in the same play. On August 25, 2005, after hitting .290 with 38 RBIs in 75 games, he was put on the 15-day DL with a torn patellar tendon and anterior cruciate ligament which rendered him inactive for the remainder of the season. On December 13, 2005, the Dodgers traded him to the Oakland Athletics along with infielder Antonio Pérez for outfielder prospect Andre Ethier.

=== Oakland Athletics (2006–2007) ===
In his first season with the Oakland Athletics, Bradley posted a .276 batting average with 14 home runs and 52 runs batted in, in a part-time role. He went on the 15-day DL on May 11, 2006, for a strained oblique muscle and a sprained right knee. On July 30, he hit a three-run walk-off home run to beat the Toronto Blue Jays with two outs in the bottom of the ninth inning. During game four of the 2006 American League Championship Series versus the Detroit Tigers, Bradley became the third player in MLB history to hit home runs from each side of the plate in a postseason game, joining Bernie Williams and Chipper Jones. For the series, he went nine-for-eighteen with two home runs and five RBIs.

On June 21, 2007, the Athletics designated him for assignment. A trade completed the next day, which would have sent Bradley to the Kansas City Royals for Leo Núñez, was voided by the Royals because Bradley had sustained an oblique injury in his last game as an Athletic. He was then traded to the San Diego Padres on June 29, with cash, in exchange for Andrew Brown; it was the second time those two players had been traded for each other.

=== San Diego Padres (2007) ===
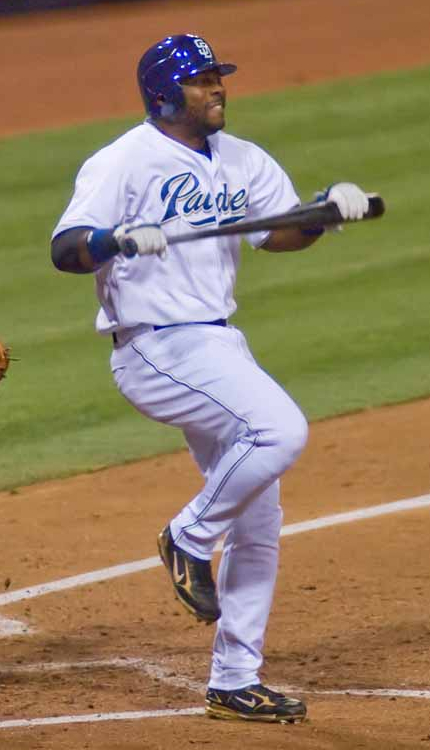
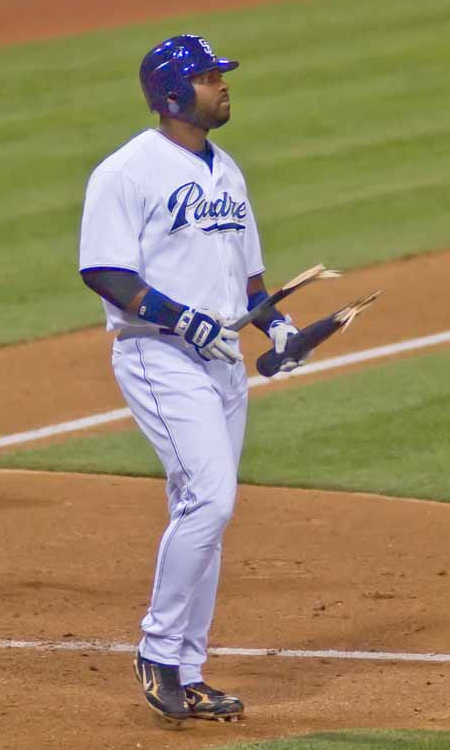
Bradley with the Padres, broke his bat over his knee after striking out on August 28, 2007.

Bradley started his tenure with the Padres on the 15-day DL, but came off it on July 7; in July, he batted .364 with four home runs and 12 RBIs in 18 games. On September 23, 2007, however, he tore his right ACL while being restrained by Padres manager Bud Black during an altercation with first base umpire Mike Winters. Home plate umpire Brian Runge reportedly told Bradley that Winters said that he had tossed his bat in Runge's direction in a previous at-bat. After Bradley reached first base, he questioned Winters about the alleged bat throwing and subsequent communication with Runge. According to Bradley and Padres first base coach Bobby Meacham, Winters addressed Bradley with a barrage of profanity. Bradley then moved towards Winters. While restrained by Black, Bradley fell to the ground and injured himself. He missed the final week of the regular season in 2007, during which the Padres lost to the Colorado Rockies in a one game playoff for the National League wild card on October 1.

Winters was suspended for the remainder of the season and also spent the postseason on the restricted list for the incident, after MLB determined that he had indeed directed obscene language toward Bradley. Bradley was not suspended, MLB finding no need for such discipline since he did not make physical contact with Winters.

=== Texas Rangers (2008) ===
After the 2007 season, Bradley agreed to a one-year contract with the Texas Rangers. He announced in early January 2008 that he expected to be healthy and ready to play in the season opener. As the Rangers' designated hitter, he led the AL in on-base percentage (.436) and on-base plus slugging (.999), and was third in batting average (.321). On making the All-Star game, he stated, "If I somehow miraculously made it to the All-Star Game, I would be floored. I'd really be totally humbled by that. I'm just happy right now to play, to produce and to be with a good group of guys." He was selected to play in his first All-Star Game in 2008 as a designated hitter (DH) after being officially selected as a DH reserve. However, he moved into the starting lineup when David Ortiz was injured.

According to The Dallas Morning News Bradley attempted to confront Kansas City Royals television announcer Ryan Lefebvre in the press box following a June 2008 game for what he believed were unfair comments made on the air. As the Rangers' designated hitter, Bradley watched the broadcast when he was not batting and took offense to a comparison Lefebvre made between him and Josh Hamilton. Manager Ron Washington and general manager Jon Daniels chased after him and stopped him before he got to Lefebvre, at which point he returned to the clubhouse in tears and said:

All I want to do is play baseball and make a better life for my kid than I had, that's it. I love all you guys. … I'm strong, but I'm not that strong.

He was quoted by Rangers radio broadcasters as saying that he never intended to physically harm Lefebvre but did want to speak to him; Daniels said he was upset that someone he didn't know was judging him.

=== Chicago Cubs (2009) ===
On January 8, 2009, Bradley signed a three-year, $30 million deal with the Chicago Cubs. He was issued a two-game suspension for making contact with umpire Larry Vanover while arguing a strike call on April 16, which was reduced to one game on appeal. During an interleague game against the Minnesota Twins on June 12, he caught a routine fly ball in right field and threw it into the stands, believing it was the third out of the inning when there were only two outs, with runners on third and first base. The umpire allowed the runner on third to score as a sacrifice fly, and allowed the runner on first to advance to third (two bases are awarded to each runner at the time of throw when a wild throw goes out of bounds).

Later that month, Cub manager Lou Piniella told Bradley to leave the dugout and go home after he "went after" a Gatorade cooler in frustration after flying out in another interleague game, against the Chicago White Sox. Piniella and Bradley later confronted each other in the locker room and exchanged words. Piniella later apologized to Bradley, and reinserted him back into the lineup during the team's next start.

On September 20, 2009, Cubs general manager Jim Hendry suspended Bradley for the remainder of the season after Bradley, in an interview with the Daily Herald, stated the team lacked a "positive environment", that there were "too many people everywhere in your face with a microphone asking the same questions repeatedly" and that "[y]ou understand why [the Cubs] haven't won in 100 years here". In response, Hendry stated he would not "tolerate [Bradley] not being able to answer questions from the media respectably." Bradley later apologized to the Cubs organization for his remarks. For the Cubs, Bradley hit .257 with 12 home runs and 40 RBIs before being traded to the Seattle Mariners for Carlos Silva and cash on December 18, 2009.

=== Seattle Mariners (2010–2011) ===
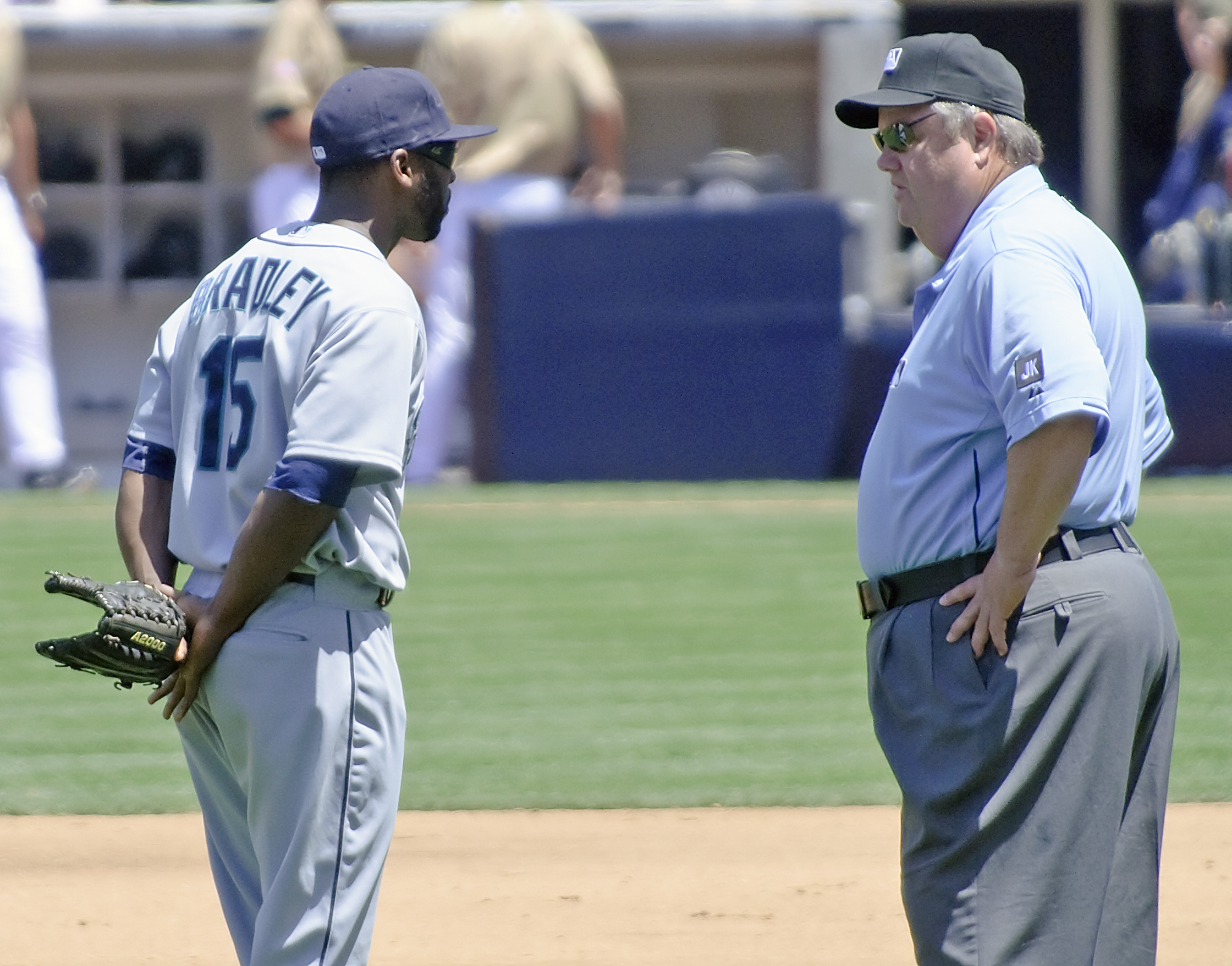
Bradley speaking to umpire Joe West

Bradley was part of a flurry of offseason moves by the Mariners in hopes of returning to the playoffs, having not reached the postseason since 2001. On May 4, 2010, he removed himself from a game, without permission, and left the stadium after an "angry exchange" with Mariners manager Don Wakamatsu after Bradley struck out with the bases loaded. The Mariners placed Bradley on the restricted list on May 6, and activated Bradley from the restricted list on May 19. He ended the season on the DL after having been placed there on July 31, retroactive to July 27, prior to arthroscopic surgery on his right knee to repair a lateral meniscus tear on August 17. He finished the 2010 season batting .205, with eight home runs and 29 RBIs over 73 games played.

On May 9, 2011, the Mariners designated Bradley for assignment after starting the 2011 season hitting .218 with two home runs and 13 RBIs in 28 games. Reportedly, the Mariners lost patience with Bradley due to his performance in a series against the White Sox. In the first game, he was ejected for arguing balls and strikes in the eighth inning, preventing the Mariners from putting in a pinch-runner due to not having enough available players. In the second game, he was booed for not hustling after several balls hit his way. In the final game, he made a poor throw that led to two White Sox runs. The Mariners released Bradley on May 16.

== Personal life ==
In August 2003, Bradley was stopped in Cuyahoga Falls, Ohio for speeding and drove away before signing for his ticket. In February 2004, he was sentenced to serve three days in jail, pay a $250 fine and complete 40 hours of community service.

In 2003, Bradley met his future wife, Monique Williams, a community relations intern for the Indians, while with the team. In 2005, Bradley was the Dodgers' nominee for the Roberto Clemente Award for working with the Dodgers Dream Foundation, Children's Hospital Los Angeles, and the Long Beach Boys & Girls Clubs, among other charities. Bradley has also opened two baseball academies, one in Long Beach and another in Baldwin Hills. In August 2005, Redondo Beach police received three domestic-violence-related calls from Bradley's house. No charges were filed. In 2006, Bradley filed for divorce but the petition was never finalized. On January 18, 2011, Bradley was arrested at his home in Encino, California and charged with making criminal threats to his wife. When he agreed to participate in an out-of-court hearing process, no charges were filed against him. However, his wife subsequently filed for divorce.

In January 2013, Bradley was charged with several crimes stemming from five different domestic incidents which occurred in 2011 and 2012. On June 3, 2013, Bradley was convicted by a jury of nine counts of physically attacking and threatening his wife including four counts of spousal battery, two counts of criminal threats, one count of assault with a deadly weapon, one count of vandalism and one count of brandishing a deadly weapon. On July 2, 2013, Bradley received a sentence of 32 months in prison and 52 weeks of anger management and domestic violence classes. Pending appeal, Bradley was released on $250,000 bail. On September 14, 2013, at the age of 33, Bradley's wife died at Encino Hospital Medical Center; an October 10 death certificate listed cryptogenic cirrhosis of the liver, hemorrhagic shock and cardiac arrest as her causes of death. In 2015, Milton maintained sole custody of his and Monique's two sons.

A Los Angeles appellate court rejected Bradley's appeal on January 21, 2015. Sports Illustrated reported in May 2015 that following another unsuccessful appeal, Bradley was ordered to begin serving the 32-month sentence for his 2013 convictions. Superior Court Judge Thomas Robinson said Bradley had "dehumanized" his wife through an "an atmosphere of fear and intimidation." Robinson was angered by Bradley's request for leniency, saying it was "breathtaking, frankly, in how callous" it was. He was not impressed by how Bradley called Monique an alcoholic while addressing the court at sentencing. In early 2016, Bradley's request to have his jail sentence reduced was denied by a Los Angeles Superior Court judge.

By April 2018, Bradley, according to Sports Illustrated, had been married to his second wife, Rachel, for two and a half years. In April 2018, Bradley was charged with spousal battery and taken into custody on bail of $175,000 for allegedly assaulting his wife during a January 2018 incident, at which time Bradley was on probation for his earlier domestic violence conviction. That June, Bradley pleaded no contest to domestic battery, was sentenced to 36 months of probation, and was required to complete 52 weeks of domestic violence counseling.

== See also ==
- List of Pan American Games medalists in baseball
- List of Texas Rangers team records
