= 2006 Toronto Blue Jays season =

2006 Toronto Blue Jays
- League: American League
- Division: East
- Ballpark: Rogers Centre
- City: Toronto
- Record: 87–75 (.537)
- Divisional place: 2nd
- Owners: Rogers; Paul Godfrey (CEO)
- General managers: J. P. Ricciardi
- Managers: John Gibbons
- Television: The Sports Network (Rod Black, Pat Tabler); Rogers Sportsnet (Jamie Campbell, Pat Tabler, Rance Mulliniks, Darrin Fletcher)
- Radio: CJCL (AM) (Jerry Howarth, Mike Wilner, Warren Sawkiw)

The 2006 Toronto Blue Jays season was the franchise's 30th season of Major League Baseball. It resulted in the Blue Jays finishing second in the American League East with a record of 87 wins and 75 losses. For the second straight season, Blue Jays hitters combined for fewer than 1,000 strikeouts. It was the first time since the team's World Series championships in 1992 and 1993 that the Blue Jays had combined for fewer than 1,000 strikeouts in consecutive 162-game seasons, as well as the first season since 1993 that the team finished above third place in its division.

== Offseason ==
- December 7, 2005: Lyle Overbay was traded by the Milwaukee Brewers with Ty Taubenheim to the Toronto Blue Jays for Dave Bush, Gabe Gross, and Zach Jackson.
- December 27, 2005: Orlando Hudson was traded by the Toronto Blue Jays with Miguel Batista to the Arizona Diamondbacks for Troy Glaus and Sergio Santos (minors).

== Regular season ==
=== Summary ===
On January 3, J.P. Ricciardi signed free-agent catcher Jason Phillips to a minor league contract. Phillips, who hit .238 the previous season for the Los Angeles Dodgers, also had an invitation to spring training, was supposed to have competed with Guillermo Quiróz for the role of the Blue Jays' backup catcher. Quiroz was later claimed on waivers by the Seattle Mariners, and Phillips started the season with the team after Gregg Zaun was put on the disabled list.

The trades for Troy Glaus and Lyle Overbay in the off-season created a glut of corner infielders for the Jays, as the team now had five players (Glaus, Overbay, Eric Hinske, Corey Koskie, and Shea Hillenbrand) who could play third base, first base, or designated hitter. The Jays relieved some of this pressure on January 6, by trading Koskie to the Milwaukee Brewers in the second deal between the two clubs in less than a month. The Blue Jays received minor league pitcher Brian Wolfe in return for Koskie. The Blue Jays also moved first baseman (and former third baseman) Eric Hinske to right field as a result.

On February 6, Toronto signed former Angels catcher Bengie Molina to a one-year contract with an option for a second. Three days later, Toronto wrapped up its off season moves by re-signing Shea Hillenbrand and Pete Walker, each to a one-year deal.

On July 2, Troy Glaus, Vernon Wells, Roy Halladay, B. J. Ryan, and Alex Ríos were picked to represent the Blue Jays at the Major League Baseball All-Star Game. However, Rios would not compete in the game due to a serious staph infection that occurred around June 28, possibly as the result of a foul ball off Rios' leg during a game on June 27. Manager John Gibbons was also picked as an assistant coach for the AL team. The five Blue Jay players selected to the AL All-Star team was the most to appear in an All-Star Game since 1993. The only AL team with more All-Stars than the Jays was the World Series champion the Chicago White Sox, with six.

On July 7, Troy Glaus was picked to compete in the 2006 Home Run Derby, though during the Derby, he hit only one home run and was eliminated after the first round.

On July 19, infielder Shea Hillenbrand was designated for assignment after an altercation with the team management. Shortly after Hillenbrand, along with reliever Vinnie Chulk, was traded to the San Francisco Giants for reliever Jeremy Accardo.

On August 3, rookie second baseman Ryan Roberts started his first game in the MLB, and had his first hit, which was a home run. He is one of few Blue Jays rookies to have his first hit a home run in his first start.

On August 12, the Blue Jays got the Minnesota Twins to hit into six double plays, tying a Blue Jays record set on April 16, 1996. (Blue Jays vs. Detroit).

On August 16, the Blue Jays traded reliever Scott Schoeneweis to the Cincinnati Reds for cash considerations or a player to be named later (later announced to be INF Trevor Lawhorn).

On August 17, the Blue Jays traded first and third baseman and outfielder Eric Hinske and cash considerations to the Boston Red Sox for a player to be named later.

During a game against the Oakland Athletics on August 21, 2006, while on the verge of blowing an 8-run lead, John Gibbons walked to the mound to remove starter Ted Lilly. An argument ensued on the mound, in front of the audience at the Rogers Centre. Lilly eventually did leave the game and then headed into the clubhouse. Gibbons subsequently followed him into the hallway, where it appeared to eyewitnesses that he and Lilly got into a fight. Numerous team members and support personnel rushed into the tunnel to break them up. After the game, both the pitcher and manager denied any altercation and said the problem had been resolved.

Despite their on-field and off-field problems, the Blue Jays managed to play well in the critical month of September, going 18–10. This, combined with the slumping of the Boston Red Sox, enabled Toronto to snare sole possession of second place in the American League East by the end of the season. This marked the first time that the Jays had finished above third place in their division since their World Championship season of 1993, and with the most wins since the 1998 season.

On November 17, the Blue Jays announced that they had signed designated hitter Frank Thomas to a two-year contract worth $18 million, with an option for 2009.

On November 28, the Blue Jays announced that they had re-signed catcher Gregg Zaun to a two-year contract with an option for 2009.

On December 18, the Blue Jays announced that they had re-signed centre fielder Vernon Wells to a seven-year contract worth $126 million, to come into effect after the 2007 season. It was the largest contract in club history.

=== Season standings ===
AL East
Team	W	L	Pct.	GB	Home	Road
New York Yankees	97	65	.599	—	50‍–‍31	47‍–‍34
Toronto Blue Jays	87	75	.537	10	50‍–‍31	37‍–‍44
Boston Red Sox	86	76	.531	11	48‍–‍33	38‍–‍43
Baltimore Orioles	70	92	.432	27	40‍–‍41	30‍–‍51
Tampa Bay Devil Rays	61	101	.377	36	41‍–‍40	20‍–‍61

=== Record vs. opponents ===
2006 American League record Source: MLB Standings Grid – 2006
Team	BAL	BOS	CWS	CLE	DET	KC	LAA	MIN	NYY	OAK	SEA	TB	TEX	TOR	NL
Baltimore	—	3–15	2–5	4–2	3–3	5–1	4–6	3–6	7–12	2–4	4–6	13–6	3–6	8–11	9–9
Boston	15–3	—	4–2	3–4	3–3	4–5	3–3	1–5	8–11	3–7	4–6	10–9	5–4	7–12	16–2
Chicago	5–2	2–4	—	8–11	12–7	11–8	6–3	9–10	2–4	3–3	5–4	3–3	5–5	5–4	14–4
Cleveland	2–4	4–3	11–8	—	6–13	10–8	4–5	8–11	3–4	3–6	4–5	6–1	5–4	4–2	8–10
Detroit	3–3	3–3	7–12	13–6	—	14–4	3–5	11–8	2–5	5–4	6–3	5–3	5–5	3–3	15–3
Kansas City	1–5	5–4	8–11	8–10	4–14	—	3–7	7–12	2–7	4–5	3–5	1–5	3–3	3–4	10–8
Los Angeles	6–4	3–3	3–6	5–4	5–3	7–3	—	4–2	6–4	11–8	10–9	7–2	11–8	4–6	7–11
Minnesota	6–3	5–1	10–9	11–8	8–11	12–7	2–4	—	3–3	6–4	5–3	6–1	4–5	2–5	16–2
New York	12–7	11–8	4–2	4–3	5–2	7–2	4–6	3–3	—	3–6	3–3	13–5	8–2	10–8	10–8
Oakland	4–2	7–3	3–3	6–3	4–5	5–4	8–11	4–6	6–3	—	17–2	6–3	9–10	6–4	8–10
Seattle	6–4	6–4	4–5	5–4	3–6	5–3	9–10	3–5	3–3	2–17	—	6–3	8–11	4–5	14–4
Tampa Bay	6–13	9–10	3–3	1–6	3–5	5–1	2–7	1–6	5–13	3–6	3–6	—	3–6	6–12	11–7
Texas	6–3	4–5	5–5	4–5	5–5	3–3	8–11	5–4	2–8	10–9	11–8	6–3	—	4–2	7–11
Toronto	11–8	12–7	4–5	2–4	3–3	4–3	6–4	5–2	8–10	4–6	5–4	12–6	2–4	—	9–9

=== 2006 draft picks ===
The 2006 MLB draft was held on June 6–7.

Round	Pick	Player	Position	College/School	Nationality	Signed
1	14	Travis Snider	OF	Jackson High School (WA)	(United States)	2006–06–18
4	120	Brandon Magee	RHP	Bradley	(United States)	2006–06–16
5	150	Luke Hopkins	1B	New Mexico State	(United States)	2006–06–11
6	180	Brian Jeroloman	C	Florida	(United States)	2006–06–29
7	210	Jonathan Baksh	OF	Florida Tech	(Canada)	2006–06–09
8	240	Daniel O'Brien	LHP	Western Michigan	(United States)	2006–06–11
9	270	Cole Figueroa	SS	Lincoln High School (FL)	(United States)	Unsigned
10	300	Scott Campbell	2B	Gonzaga	(New Zealand)	2006–06–21

=== Roster ===
2006 Toronto Blue Jays
Roster
Pitchers: 49 Jeremy Accardo; 34 A. J. Burnett; 39 Gustavo Chacín; 50 Vinnie Chulk; 37 Scott Downs; 54 Jason Frasor; 32 Roy Halladay; 44 Casey Janssen; 22 Brandon League; 31 Ted Lilly; 28 Shaun Marcum; 40 Dustin McGowan; 50 Davis Romero; 36 Francisco Rosario; 52 B. J. Ryan; 60 Scott Schoeneweis; 30 Justin Speier; 56 Brian Tallet; 48 Ty Taubenheim; 7 Josh Towers; 41 Pete Walker	Catchers: 1 Bengie Molina; 47 Jason Phillips; 9 Gregg Zaun; Infielders: 8 Russ Adams; 13 Edgardo Alfonzo; 43 Kevin Barker; 46 Luis Figueroa; 25 Troy Glaus; 23 John Hattig; 2 Aaron Hill; 29 Shea Hillenbrand; 6 John McDonald; 35 Lyle Overbay; 4 Ryan Roberts	Outfielders: 27 Frank Catalanotto; 11 Eric Hinske; 3 Reed Johnson; 26 Adam Lind; 21 Chad Mottola; 15 Alex Ríos; 10 Vernon Wells	Manager: 5 John Gibbons; Coaches: 38 Brad Arnsberg (pitching); 14 Mickey Brantley (hitting); 55 Brian Butterfield (third base); 58 Marty Pevey (first base); 52 Bruce Walton (bullpen); 12 Ernie Whitt (bench)

=== Game log ===
2006 Game Log: 87–75
April

#	Date	Opponent	Score	Win	Loss	Save	Attendance	Record	GB
1	April 4	Twins	6–3	Halladay (1–0)	Santana (0–1)	Ryan (1)	50,449	1–0	
2	April 5	Twins	13–4	Radke (1–0)	Towers (0–1)		18,156	1–1	
3	April 6	Twins	6–3	Chacín (1–0)	Silva (0–1)	Ryan (2)	16,221	2–1	
4	April 7	Devil Rays	9–8	Dunn (1–0)	Walker (0–1)	Miceli (1)	15,631	2–2	
5	April 8	Devil Rays	8–4	Tallet (1–0)	Childers (0–1)		18,755	3–2	
6	April 9	Devil Rays	5–2	Kazmir (1–1)	Halladay (1–1)	Miceli (2)	20,184	3–3	
7	April 11	@ Red Sox	5–3	Beckett (2–0)	Towers (0–2)	Papelbon (4)	35,491	3–4	
8	April 12	@ Red Sox	8–4	Chacín (2–0)	Wells (0–1)		36,378	4–4	
9	April 13	@ Red Sox	8–6	Lilly (1–0)	Clement (1–1)	Ryan (3)	36,524	5–4	
10	April 14	@ White Sox	13–7	Walker (1–1)	Vázquez (0–1)		31,418	6–4	
11	April 15	@ White Sox	4–2	Buehrle (2–0)	Burnett (0–1)	Jenks (4)	33,247	6–5	
12	April 16	@ White Sox	6–4 (5)	García (2–1)	Towers (0–3)		27,137	6–6	
13	April 18	Yankees	10–5	Chacín (3–0)	Johnson (2–2)		48,776	7–6	
14	April 19	Yankees	3–1	Mussina (2–1)	Lilly (1–1)	Rivera (2)	32,886	7–7	
15	April 21	Red Sox	7–6 (12)	Speier (1–0)	Foulke (0–1)		28,333	8–7	
16	April 22	Red Sox	8–1	Halladay (2–1)	DiNardo (0–1)	Walker (1)	34,387	9–7	
17	April 23	Red Sox	6–3	Clement (2–1)	Towers (0–4)	Papelbon (8)	28,737	9–8	
18	April 25	Orioles	7–3	Chacín (4–0)	López (1–2)		32,257	10–8	
19	April 26	Orioles	8–2	Lilly (2–1)	Bédard (4–1)		19,336	11–8	
20	April 27	Orioles	7–5	Benson (3–2)	Janssen (0–1)		18,756	11–9	
21	April 28	@ Yankees	7–2	Halladay (3–1)	Wright (0–2)	Ryan (4)	47,204	12–9	
22	April 29	@ Yankees	17–6	Johnson (4–2)	Towers (0–5)		50,119	12–10	
23	April 30	@ Yankees	4–1	Mussina (4–1)	Chacín (4–1)	Rivera (4)	52,954	12–11	

May

#	Date	Opponent	Score	Win	Loss	Save	Attendance	Record	GB
24	May 1	@ Orioles	9–7	Lilly (3–1)	Hawkins (0–1)	Ryan (5)	14,315	13–11	
25	May 2	@ Orioles	9–2	Benson (4–2)	Janssen (0–2)	Williams (1)	15,795	13–12	
26	May 3	@ Red Sox	7–6	McGowan (1–0)	Papelbon (0–1)	Ryan (6)	35,881	14–12	
27	May 4	@ Red Sox	7–4	Clement (3–2)	Towers (0–6)	Papelbon (11)	36,396	14–13	
28	May 5	Angels	13–3	Chacín (5–1)	Santana (2–1)		22,227	15–13	
29	May 6	Angels	3–0	Escobar (4–2)	Lilly (3–2)	Rodríguez (9)	29,761	15–14	
30	May 7	Angels	3–1	Janssen (1–2)	Lackey (3–3)	Ryan (7)	24,351	16–14	
31	May 8	Angels	5–1	Halladay (4–1)	Weaver (1–5)		18,611	17–14	
32	May 9	Athletics	6–5	Haren (2–3)	Towers (0–7)	Street (5)	36,269	17–15	
33	May 10	Athletics	9–7	Rosario (1–0)	Blanton (3–4)	Ryan (8)	19,269	18–15	
34	May 11	Athletics	8–3	Lilly (4–2)	Saarloos (1–1)		23,974	19–15	
35	May 12	@ Devil Rays	4–1	McClung (2–4)	Janssen (1–3)	Walker (5)	11,816	19–16	
36	May 13	@ Devil Rays	8–1	Halladay (5–1)	Hendrickson (2–3)		15,184	20–16	
37	May 14	@ Devil Rays	8–3	Towers (1–7)	Fossum (1–2)		12,224	21–16	
38	May 16	@ Angels	8–3	Santana (4–1)	Lilly (4–3)		43,066	21–17	
39	May 17	@ Angels	3–0	Janssen (2–3)	Escobar (5–3)	Ryan (9)	38,767	22–17	
40	May 18	@ Angels	8–4 (10)	Frasor (1–0)	Rodríguez (0–1)		37,850	23–17	
41	May 19	@ Rockies	8–3	Cook (5–3)	Towers (1–8)		26,011	23–18	
42	May 20	@ Rockies	5–1	Francis (3–3)	Taubenheim (0–1)		26,212	23–19	
43	May 21	@ Rockies	5–3	Fogg (3–2)	Lilly (4–4)	Fuentes (10)	30,291	23–20	
44	May 22	Devil Rays	6–4	Janssen (3–3)	McClung (2–5)	Ryan (10)	22,563	24–20	
45	May 23	Devil Rays	4–1	Halladay (6–1)	Hendrickson (3–4)	Ryan (11)	34,594	25–20	
46	May 24	Devil Rays	10–8	Camp (2–0)	Frasor (1–1)	Walker (9)	20,187	25–21	
47	May 26	White Sox	8–2	Lilly (5–4)	García (7–2)		22,729	26–21	
48	May 27	White Sox	3–2 (11)	Schoeneweis (1–0)	Nelson (0–1)		30,063	27–21	
49	May 28	White Sox	7–5	Garland (4–2)	Taubenheim (0–2)	Jenks (14)	35,277	27–22	
50	May 29	Red Sox	7–6	Ryan (1–0)	Riske (0–1)		24,038	28–22	
51	May 30	Red Sox	8–5	Chacín (6–1)	Beckett (7–2)	Ryan (12)	27,324	29–22	
52	May 31	Red Sox	8–6	Van Buren (1–0)	Lilly (5–5)	Papelbon (19)	24,526	29–23	

June

#	Date	Opponent	Score	Win	Loss	Save	Attendance	Record	GB
53	June 2	@ Devil Rays	13–4	Janssen (4–3)	McClung (2–7)		9,463	30–23	
54	June 3	@ Devil Rays	6–2	Halladay (7–1)	Hendrickson (3–6)	Ryan (13)	15,696	31–23	
55	June 4	@ Devil Rays	10–5	Waechter (1–4)	Chacín (6–2)		14,347	31–24	
56	June 5	@ Orioles	4–0	Cabrera (3–2)	Lilly (5–6)		15,185	31–25	
57	June 6	@ Orioles	6–4	Downs (1–0)	Britton (0–1)	Ryan (14)	16,868	32–25	
58	June 7	@ Orioles	5–3	Janssen (5–3)	Benson (6–5)	Ryan (15)	15,803	33–25	
59	June 8	@ Orioles	7–5	Birkins (2–0)	Rosario (1–1)	Ray (15)	17,637	33–26	
60	June 9	Tigers	10–5	Frasor (2–1)	Jones (0–4)		21,425	34–26	
61	June 10	Tigers	5–3	Miner (1–1)	Lilly (5–7)	Jones (17)	27,021	34–27	
62	June 11	Tigers	10–5	Robertson (6–3)	Taubenheim (0–3)	Zumaya (1)	30,404	34–28	
63	June 12	Orioles	6–4	Benson (7–5)	Janssen (5–4)	Ray (16)	17,876	34–29	
64	June 13	Orioles	7–1	Halladay (8–1)	Loewen (0–1)		20,766	35–29	
65	June 14	Orioles	6–3	Chulk (1–0)	López (4–8)	Ryan (16)	23,325	36–29	
66	June 15	Orioles	4–2	Lilly (6–7)	Cabrera (4–3)	Ryan (17)	32,285	37–29	
67	June 16	@ Marlins	3–1	Olsen (6–3)	Taubenheim (0–4)	Tankersley (2)	10,242	37–30	
68	June 17	@ Marlins	8–2	Moehler (5–5)	Janssen (5–5)		12,099	37–31	
69	June 18	@ Marlins	4–1	Johnson (6–4)	Halladay (8–2)	Borowski (11)	10,536	37–32	
70	June 20	@ Braves	6–5	Schoeneweis (2–0)	Yates (0–1)	Ryan (18)	26,915	38–32	
71	June 21	@ Braves	6–3	Lilly (7–7)	Hudson (6–6)	Ryan (19)	26,232	39–32	
72	June 22	@ Braves	3–2	Taubenheim (1–4)	Remlinger (2–4)	Ryan (20)	26,829	40–32	
73	June 23	Mets	6–1	Glavine (11–2)	Janssen (5–6)		28,507	40–33	
74	June 24	Mets	7–4	Halladay (9–2)	Hernández (4–7)	Ryan (21)	31,327	41–33	
75	June 25	Mets	7–4	Trachsel (6–4)	Towers (1–9)	Wagner (15)	32,277	41–34	
76	June 27	Nationals	6–0	Burnett (1–1)	Ortiz (5–6)		20,288	42–34	
77	June 28	Nationals	6–1	Lilly (8–7)	Hill (1–3)		17,067	43–34	
78	June 29	Nationals	8–4	Halladay (10–2)	Patterson (1–2)		17,175	44–34	
79	June 30	Phillies	8–1	Janssen (6–6)	Bernero (0–1)		17,311	45–34	

July

#	Date	Opponent	Score	Win	Loss	Save	Attendance	Record	GB
80	July 1	Phillies	5–2	Downs (2–0)	Lidle (4–7)	Ryan (22)	24,248	46–34	
81	July 2	Phillies	11–6	Geary (5–0)	Burnett (1–2)		26,177	46–35	
82	July 3	@ Rangers	6–1	Rheinecker (4–2)	Lilly (8–8)		30,021	46–36	
83	July 4	@ Rangers	3–2	Halladay (11–2)	Koronka (6–5)	Ryan (23)	42,255	47–36	
84	July 5	@ Rangers	9–3	Padilla (8–5)	Janssen (6–7)	Cordero (6)	25,803	47–37	
85	July 6	@ Royals	6–2	Redman (6–4)	Taubenheim (1–5)		10,858	47–38	
86	July 7	@ Royals	13–3	Hudson (2–3)	Burnett (1–3)		17,162	47–39	
87	July 8	@ Royals	7–5	Tallet (2–0)	Peralta (1–1)	Ryan (24)	22,635	48–39	
88	July 9	@ Royals	11–3	Halladay (12–2)	Gobble (3–2)		17,748	49–39	
89	July 14	Mariners	5–3	Meche (9–4)	Janssen (6–8)	Putz (17)	23,443	49–40	
90	July 15	Mariners	7–6 (14)	Downs (3–0)	Fruto (0–1)		36,069	50–40	
91	July 16	Mariners	4–3 (11)	Downs (4–0)	Sherrill (2–2)		28,679	51–40	
92	July 17	Rangers	10–1	Lilly (9–8)	Koronka (6–6)		16,872	52–40	
93	July 18	Rangers	5–2	Padilla (10–5)	Schoeneweis (2–1)	Otsuka (19)	20,017	52–41	
94	July 19	Rangers	5–4	Millwood (10–5)	Janssen (6–9)	Otsuka (20)	20,778	52–42	
95	July 20	Yankees	5–4 (11)	Tallet (3–0)	Rivera (4–5)		42,336	53–42	
96	July 21	Yankees	7–3	Burnett (2–3)	Wright (6–6)	Schoeneweis (1)	40,149	54–42	
97	July 22	Yankees	5–4	Wang (11–4)	Downs (4–1)	Rivera (23)	50,014	54–43	
98	July 23	Yankees	13–5	Marcum (1–0)	Ponson (0–1)		42,337	55–43	
99	July 24	@ Mariners	7–3	Piñeiro (7–8)	Janssen (6–10)		29,787	55–44	
100	July 25	@ Mariners	12–3	Halladay (13–2)	Meche (9–5)		30,793	56–44	
101	July 26	@ Mariners	7–4	Moyer (6–9)	Burnett (2–4)	Putz (20)	33,629	56–45	
102	July 27	@ Athletics	5–2	Blanton (11–8)	Lilly (9–9)	Street (21)	19,251	56–46	
103	July 28	@ Athletics	4–3	Downs (5–1)	Loaiza (4–7)	Ryan (25)	22,217	57–46	
104	July 29	@ Athletics	7–4	Zito (11–7)	McGowan (1–1)	Street (22)	25,627	57–47	
105	July 30	@ Athletics	6–5	Street (4–3)	Ryan (1–1)		29,709	57–48	

August

#	Date	Opponent	Score	Win	Loss	Save	Attendance	Record	GB
106	August 1	@ Yankees	5–1	Wright (7–6)	Burnett (2–5)		52,237	57–49	
107	August 2	@ Yankees	7–2	Wang (13–4)	Lilly (9–10)		54,414	57–50	
108	August 3	@ Yankees	8–1	Lidle (1–0)	Marcum (1–1)		52,156	57–51	
109	August 4	White Sox	6–4	Garland (12–3)	Halladay (13–3)	Jenks (30)	30,060	57–52	
110	August 5	White Sox	7–1	Vázquez (10–6)	Rosario (1–2)		35,117	57–53	
111	August 6	White Sox	7–3	Burnett (3–5)	Contreras (10–4)		36,453	58–53	
112	August 7	Orioles	8–1	Accardo (1–0)	Ortiz (0–3)	League (1)	23,838	59–53	
113	August 8	Orioles	8–4	Cabrera (5–7)	Schoeneweis (2–2)		28,823	59–54	
114	August 9	Orioles	4–3	Halladay (14–3)	Bédard (12–8)	Ryan (26)	34,199	60–54	
115	August 10	@ Twins	5–0	Lilly (10–10)	Silva (8–10)		30,118	61–54	
116	August 11	@ Twins	7–1	Burnett (4–5)	Garza (0–1)		31,814	62–54	
117	August 12	@ Twins	4–0	Downs (6–1)	Bonser (2–4)		36,261	63–54	
118	August 13	@ Twins	5–0	Radke (12–8)	Marcum (1–2)		32,811	63–55	
119	August 15	@ Devil Rays	4–3	Halladay (15–3)	Meadows (2–3)	Ryan (27)	9,217	64–55	
120	August 16	@ Devil Rays	8–3	Shields (5–6)	Lilly (10–11)		8,195	64–56	
121	August 17	@ Devil Rays	6–2	Burnett (5–5)	Meadows (2–4)		8,697	65–56	
122	August 18	@ Orioles	7–2	Benson (10–9)	Downs (6–2)		22,679	65–57	
123	August 19	@ Orioles	15–0	Cabrera (6–8)	Marcum (1–3)		25,380	65–58	
124	August 20	@ Orioles	9–2	Halladay (16–3)	Bédard (12–9)		23,639	66–58	
125	August 21	Athletics	12–10	Haren (12–9)	League (0–1)	Duchscherer (4)	28,280	66–59	
126	August 22	Athletics	4–3	Burnett (6–5)	Halsey (3–4)	Ryan (28)	30,071	67–59	
127	August 23	Athletics	6–0	Loaiza (7–7)	Chacín (6–3)		32,516	67–60	
128	August 25	Royals	6–3	Marcum (2–3)	Hudson (6–5)	Ryan (29)	26,343	68–60	
129	August 26	Royals	2–0	Hernández (4–8)	Halladay (16–4)		38,070	68–61	
130	August 27	Royals	10–6	Lilly (11–11)	Pérez (1–2)		36,417	69–61	
131	August 28	@ Indians	6–4	Byrd (9–6)	Burnett (6–6)	Mastny (4)	19,623	69–62	
132	August 29	@ Indians	5–2	Sabathia (10–8)	League (0–2)		21,563	69–63	
133	August 30	@ Indians	3–2 (10)	Betancourt (3–4)	Ryan (1–2)		22,065	69–64	
134	August 31	@ Red Sox	6–4	Delcarmen (2–0)	Halladay (16–5)	Papelbon (35)	36,238	69–65	

September

#	Date	Opponent	Score	Win	Loss	Save	Attendance	Record	GB
135	September 1	@ Red Sox	2–1	Snyder (4–3)	Lilly (11–12)	Timlin (3)	36,235	69–66	
136	September 2	@ Red Sox	5–1	Burnett (7–6)	Jarvis (0–1)		35,973	70–66	
137	September 3	@ Red Sox	6–1	Chacín (7–3)	Beckett (14–10)		35,719	71–66	
138	September 4	Indians	4–3	League (1–2)	Sabathia (10–9)	Ryan (30)	27,864	72–66	
139	September 5	Indians	7–2	Sowers (7–3)	Accardo (1–1)		18,517	72–67	
140	September 6	Indians	3–2	Lilly (12–12)	Westbrook (12–9)	Ryan (31)	20,406	73–67	
141	September 8	@ Angels	4–1	Saunders (5–2)	Burnett (7–7)	Rodríguez (40)	42,259	73–68	
142	September 9	@ Angels	2–1	Chacín (8–3)	Escobar (10–13)	Ryan (32)	44,007	74–68	
143	September 10	@ Angels	4–3	Weaver (11–2)	Towers (1–10)	Rodríguez (41)	40,506	74–69	
144	September 11	@ Mariners	6–2	Lilly (13–12)	Woods (4–3)		24,462	75–69	
145	September 12	@ Mariners	4–2	Meche (10–8)	Marcum (2–4)	Putz (32)	26,144	75–70	
146	September 13	@ Mariners	10–0	Burnett (8–7)	Baek (3–1)		26,225	76–70	
147	September 15	Devil Rays	5–4 (10)	Ryan (2–2)	Meadows (3–6)		27,607	77–70	
148	September 16	Devil Rays	6–1	Lilly (14–12)	Howell (0–3)		30,698	78–70	
149	September 17	Devil Rays	5–3	Speier (2–0)	Camp (7–4)	Ryan (33)	32,959	79–70	
150	September 18	Yankees	7–6	Rasner (3–0)	Burnett (8–8)	Veras (1)	32,846	79–71	
151	September 19	Yankees	6–3	Karstens (2–1)	Frasor (2–2)	Farnsworth (6)	30,793	79–72	
152	September 20	Yankees	3–2	Romero (1–0)	Henn (0–1)	Ryan (34)	33,029	80–72	
153	September 22	Red Sox	7–1	Tavárez (4–4)	Lilly (14–13)		33,874	80–73	
154	September 23	Red Sox	5–3	Burnett (9–8)	Hansack (0–1)	Ryan (35)	42,267	81–73	
155	September 24	Red Sox	13–4	Chacín (9–3)	Snyder (4–5)		44,212	82–73	
156	September 25	Red Sox	5–0	Marcum (3–4)	Wakefield (7–11)		40,123	83–73	
157	September 26	@ Tigers	4–3	Bonderman (14–8)	McGowan (1–2)	Jones (37)	27,908	83–74	
158	September 27	@ Tigers	7–4	Lilly (15–13)	Robertson (13–13)	Ryan (36)	26,430	84–74	
159	September 28	@ Tigers	8–6	Burnett (10–8)	Rogers (17–7)	Ryan (37)	28,670	85–74	
160	September 29	@ Yankees	7–2	Mussina (15–7)	Chacín (9–4)		52,331	85–75	
161	September 30	@ Yankees	6–5	Frasor (3–2)	Myers (1–2)	Ryan (38)	54,576	86–75	

October

#	Date	Opponent	Score	Win	Loss	Save	Attendance	Record	GB
162	October 1	@ Yankees	7–5	Towers (2–10)	Farnsworth (3–6)	Downs (1)	54,886	87–75	

== Player stats ==
= Indicates team leader

=== Batting ===
==== Starters by position ====
Note: Pos = Position; G = Games played; AB = At bats; H = Hits; Avg. = Batting average; HR = Home runs; RBI = Runs batted in

Pos	Player	G	AB	H	Avg.	HR	RBI
C	Bengie Molina	117	433	123	.284	19	57
1B	Lyle Overbay	157	581	181	.312	22	92
2B	Aaron Hill	155	546	159	.291	6	50
SS	John McDonald	104	260	58	.223	3	23
3B	Troy Glaus	153	540	136	.252	38	104
LF	Frank Catalanotto	128	437	131	.300	7	56
CF	Vernon Wells	154	611	185	.303	32	106
RF	Alex Ríos	128	450	136	.302	17	82
DH	Shea Hillenbrand	81	296	89	.301	12	39

==== Other batters ====
Note: G = Games played; AB = At bats; H = Hits; Avg. = Batting average; HR = Home runs; RBI = Runs batted in

Player	G	AB	H	Avg.	HR	RBI
Reed Johnson	134	461	147	.319	12	49
Gregg Zaun	99	290	79	.272	12	40
Russ Adams	90	251	55	.219	3	28
Eric Hinske	78	197	52	.264	12	29
Adam Lind	18	60	22	.367	2	8
Jason Phillips	25	48	12	.250	0	6
Edgardo Alfonzo	12	37	6	.162	0	4
John Hattig	13	24	8	.333	0	3
Kevin Barker	12	17	4	.235	1	1
Chad Mottola	10	16	4	.250	0	0
Ryan Roberts	9	13	1	.077	1	1
Luis Figueroa	8	9	1	.111	0	0

=== Pitching ===
==== Starting pitchers ====
Note: G = Games pitched; IP = Innings pitched; W = Wins; L = Losses; ERA = Earned run average; SO = Strikeouts

Player	G	IP	W	L	ERA	SO
Roy Halladay	32	220.0	16	5	3.19	132
Ted Lilly	32	181.2	15	13	4.31	160
A.J. Burnett	21	135.2	10	8	3.98	118
Casey Janssen	19	94.0	6	10	5.07	44
Gustavo Chacin	17	87.1	9	4	5.05	47

==== Other pitchers ====
Note: G = Games pitched; IP = Innings pitched; W = Wins; L = Losses; ERA = Earned run average; SO = Strikeouts

Player	G	IP	W	L	ERA	SO
Shawn Marcum	21	78.1	3	4	5.06	65
Josh Towers	15	62.0	2	10	8.42	35
Ty Taubenheim	12	35.0	1	5	4.89	26
Dustin McGowan	16	27.1	1	2	7.24	22

==== Relief pitchers ====
Note: G = Games pitched; W = Wins; L = Losses; SV = Saves; ERA = Earned run average; SO = Strikeouts

Player	G	W	L	SV	ERA	SO
B.J. Ryan	65	2	2	38	1.37	86
Scott Downs	59	6	2	1	4.09	61
Justin Speier	58	2	0	0	2.98	55
Scott Schoenweis	55	2	2	1	6.51	18
Jason Frasor	51	3	2	0	4.32	51
Brian Tallet	44	3	0	0	3.81	37
Brandon League	33	1	2	1	2.53	29
Jeremy Accardo	27	1	1	0	5.97	14
Pete Walker	23	1	1	1	5.40	27
Vinnie Chulk	20	1	0	0	5.25	18
Francisco Rosario	17	1	2	0	6.65	21
Davis Romero	7	1	0	0	3.86	10

== Award winners ==
- Vernon Wells, Gold Glove Award

All-Star Game

- Troy Glaus, third base
- Roy Halladay, pitcher
- Alex Ríos, outfield
- B. J. Ryan, pitcher
- Vernon Wells, outfield

== Farm system ==
Level	Team	League	Manager
AAA	Syracuse SkyChiefs	International League	Mike Basso
AA	New Hampshire Fisher Cats	Eastern League	Doug Davis
A	Dunedin Blue Jays	Florida State League	Omar Malavé
A	Lansing Lugnuts	Midwest League	Ken Joyce
A-Short Season	Auburn Doubledays	New York–Penn League	Dennis Holmberg
Rookie	Pulaski Blue Jays	Appalachian League	Dave Pano
