= 2005 Toronto Blue Jays season =

2005 Toronto Blue Jays
- League: American League
- Division: East
- Ballpark: Rogers Centre
- City: Toronto
- Record: 80–82 (.494)
- Divisional place: 3rd
- Owners: Rogers; Paul Godfrey (CEO)
- General managers: J. P. Ricciardi
- Managers: John Gibbons
- Television: The Sports Network (Pat Tabler, Rod Black); Rogers Sportsnet (Tom Candiotti, Darrin Fletcher, Rance Mulliniks, Pat Tabler, Jamie Campbell)
- Radio: CJCL (AM) (Jerry Howarth, Warren Sawkiw, Mike Wilner)

The 2005 Toronto Blue Jays season was the franchise's 29th season in Major League Baseball. It resulted in the Blue Jays finishing third in the American League East with a record of 80 wins and 82 losses. This was the first 162-game season since 1993 that Blue Jays hitters would combine for less than 1,000 strikeouts. This was also the team's first season as Canada's only MLB team, as the Montreal Expos relocated and became the Washington Nationals at the end of the 2004 MLB season.

== Transactions ==
Transactions by the Toronto Blue Jays during the off-season before the 2005 season.

=== October 2004 ===
October 4	Jason Kershner granted free agency (signed with Boston Red Sox to a one-year contract on November 18, 2004).
October 5	Chad Hermansen granted free agency. Dave Maurer granted free agency.
October 8	Bobby Estalella granted free agency.
October 11	Signed amateur free agent Joel Carreño to a contract.
October 14	Sean Douglass granted free agency (signed with Detroit Tigers to a one-year contract on November 9, 2004).
October 15	Stubby Clapp granted free agency. Bob File granted free agency (signed with St. Louis Cardinals to a contract on January 12, 2005). Aquilino López granted free agency (signed with Los Angeles Dodgers to a contract on December 2, 2004). Julius Matos granted free agency (signed with Toronto Blue Jays to a one-year contract on November 12, 2004). Micheal Nakamura granted free agency. Simon Pond granted free agency (signed with Boston Red Sox to a one-year contract on December 15, 2004). Jesús Sánchez granted free agency. Anthony Sanders granted free agency (signed with Toronto Blue Jays to a one-year contract on November 16, 2004). Glenn Williams granted free agency (signed with Minnesota Twins to a one-year contract on December 14, 2004). Chris Woodward granted free agency (signed with New York Mets to a one-year, $700,000 contract on December 29, 2004).
October 19	Howie Clark granted free agency (signed with Pittsburgh Pirates to a one-year contract on November 1, 2004).
October 28	Dave Berg granted free agency (signed with Boston Red Sox to a one-year contract on February 7, 2005). Carlos Delgado granted free agency (signed with Florida Marlins to a four-year, $52 million contract on January 26, 2005). Valerio De Los Santos granted free agency (signed with Florida Marlins to a one-year contract on April 13, 2005). Chris Gomez granted free agency (signed with Baltimore Orioles to a one-year, $850,000 contract on December 8, 2004).
October 29	Greg Myers granted free agency (signed with Toronto Blue Jays to a contract on November 19, 2004).

=== November 2004 ===
November 1	Gregg Zaun granted free agency (signed with Toronto Blue Jays to a two-year, $1.95 million contract on January 6, 2005).
November 3	Signed free agent Matt Whiteside from the Atlanta Braves to a one-year contract.
November 11	Signed free agent Jesse Carlson from the Houston Astros to a one-year contract. Pat Hentgen granted free agency.
November 12	Re-signed free agent Julius Matos to a one-year contract.
November 16	Re-signed free agent Anthony Sanders to a one-year contract.
November 17	Signed free agent Jason Alfaro from the Houston Astros to a one-year contract.
November 19	Re-signed free agent Greg Myers to a contract.

=== December 2004 ===
December 2	Acquired John McDonald from the Cleveland Indians for a player to be named later (Tom Mastny on December 14, 2004).
December 6	Selected Steve Andrade off of waivers from the Anaheim Angels.
December 8	Tyrell Godwin selected by the Washington Nationals in the 2004 MLB Rule 5 draft.
December 12	Acquired Chad Gaudin from the Tampa Bay Devil Rays for Kevin Cash.
December 13	Drafted Lee Gronkiewicz from the Cleveland Indians in the 2004 MLB Rule 5 draft.
December 14	Signed free agent Corey Koskie from the Minnesota Twins to a three-year, $17 million contract.
December 16	Signed free agent Scott Downs from the Washington Nationals to a one-year, $705,000 contract. Signed free agent Bry Nelson from the Chicago White Sox to a one-year contract.
December 21	Kevin Frederick granted free agency (signed with Boston Red Sox to a contract on July 11, 2005).

=== January 2005 ===
January 1	Released Jayson Durocher.
January 6	Signed free agent Ken Huckaby from the Texas Rangers to a one-year contract. Re-signed free agent Gregg Zaun to a two-year, $1.95 million contract.
January 8	Signed free agent Chad Mottola from the Baltimore Orioles to a contract.
January 10	Signed free agent Billy Koch from the Florida Marlins to a contract.
January 11	Signed free agent Scott Schoeneweis from the Anaheim Angels to a two-year, $5.25 million contract.
January 12	Acquired Shea Hillenbrand from the Arizona Diamondbacks for Adam Peterson.
January 17	Signed free agent Matt Duff from the Boston Red Sox to a contract.

=== February 2005 ===
February 19	Signed free agent Pete Walker from the Yokohama Bay Stars of the NPB to a one-year, $400,000 contract.
February 28	Signed free agent Chris Michalak from the Florida Marlins to a contract.

=== March 2005 ===
March 22	Tyrell Godwin returned from the Washington Nationals. Acquired A.J. Wideman from the Washington Nationals for Tyrell Godwin.
March 28	Released Mike Smith.

=== April 2005 ===
April 1	Purchased Andy Dominique from the New York Yankees. Released Kerry Ligtenberg.
April 3	Signed free agent Kevin Barker from the Philadelphia Phillies to a one-year contract. Released Chris Michalak.

== Regular season ==
=== Summary ===
On February 2, 2005, several days after finalizing the purchase of SkyDome by Rogers Communications, Rogers renamed the stadium to the Rogers Centre. In spite of the best efforts of the new ownership, a wide majority of Blue Jays fans continued (and still continue) to refer to the stadium as SkyDome. By the start of the season, Rogers had upgraded the stadium with a new "JumboTron" videoboard and added other state-of-the-art video screens around the stadium. Furthermore, the AstroTurf surface was replaced by the more natural-looking FieldTurf. Owner Ted Rogers also promised a payroll increase to $210 million over the next three years, which allowed the team to have a team payroll of $70 million per year.

The Blue Jays finished spring training with a 16–10 record. Among the stars of spring training was Gabe Gross, who tied the Jays' record for most home runs in spring training with eight (the previous record breaker was long time Blue Jay Carlos Delgado). The Jays were able to translate their success in spring training into an excellent start—the team led the AL East from early to mid-April and held their record around .500 until late August. The Jays were hit with the injury bug when third baseman Corey Koskie broke his finger, taking him out of the lineup, but the club was pleasantly surprised with the performance of rookie call-up Aaron Hill in his stead.

On July 8, just prior to the All-Star break, Blue Jays ace Roy Halladay was struck on the shin by a line drive from Texas left fielder Kevin Mench and was placed on the DL with a fractured leg. The injury cost Halladay his chance to be the American League starter in the All-Star Game in Detroit; his place on the All-Star squad was taken by Red Sox pitcher Matt Clement. Though Halladay's injury was hoped to be minor, the recovery process was met with constant delays, and Halladay eventually would prove to be out for the rest of the season. Team management officially announced that he would miss the rest of the season in August. The Halladay injury is seen by many as the negative turning point in the Jays season; the team had been in serious wild card contention at the time, but afterwards fell out of the race and failed to make the playoffs for the 12th consecutive year.

On July 22, Toronto traded utility infielder John McDonald to the Detroit Tigers for cash considerations. This gave the Blue Jays an open spot on the roster so that Aaron Hill could stay with the team when Corey Koskie returned from injury.

On July 28, Toronto played in the longest game in franchise history, innings-wise, an 18-inning marathon against the Los Angeles Angels of Anaheim at Rogers Centre. The Jays won 2–1, after nearly five hours of play when Orlando Hudson hit a line drive past a drawn in infield, scoring Alex Ríos from third base.

The shutdown of Halladay for the remainder of the season seemed to affect the performance of the Jays. They went on a slump that brought their record under .500 in the beginning of September. From there, the Blue Jays finished the season 80–82 while receiving glimpses of the future from September call-ups Guillermo Quiróz, John-Ford Griffin, and Shaun Marcum. Marcum made himself noteworthy by posting an ERA of 0.00 over 5 relief appearances and 8 innings in September. Griffin hit his first career home run in the last game of the season and ended up going 4 for 13.

Josh Towers also stepped up, showing largely unseen potential going 7–5 with a 2.91 ERA in the 2nd half of the year and a 13–12, 3.71 ERA season overall, making him arguably the unlikely ace of the Jays rotation with Halladay injured and Gustavo Chacín faltering somewhat after the All-Star break.

The 2005 Jays inability to score with men in scoring position was a turning point in many games that ended up as losses, also contributing to the 80–82 record, although as a positive, the team did improve by 13 wins and returned to their usual 80-win plateau.

On October 9, the Jays, along with their fans, mourned the loss of inaugural broadcaster Tom Cheek. Cheek, 66, succumbed to brain cancer after just over a year-long battle. Cheek had broadcast 4,306 consecutive games since the first day of the franchise. His streak was ended in June 2004 when he took time off to visit his ailing father.

In the off-season, general manager J. P. Ricciardi began to make good use of the money that had been granted to the Jays by Rogers Communications before the season. Rogers had given Ricciardi $210 million over three years, which became $75 million a season to spend, $25 million more than the previous year. Ricciardi fulfilled the team's need for a stable closer by signing former Baltimore Orioles standout B. J. Ryan to the richest contract ever for a reliever – a 5-year, $47 million on November 28. Following that, the club awarded a 5-year, $55 million contract to highly coveted starting pitcher A. J. Burnett, formerly of the Florida Marlins, on December 6.

On December 23, 2005, Rogers Sportsnet reported that the Jays added a much needed 30 plus home run hitter to their lineup by getting third baseman and 2002 World Series MVP Troy Glaus and minor league shortstop Sergio Santos in a trade with the Arizona Diamondbacks. In return, the Diamondbacks received second baseman and 2005 Gold Glove Award winner Orlando Hudson and pitcher Miguel Batista. Glaus passed a team physical on December 26, and the trade was officially announced the next day. On the same day as the announcement of the Glaus deal, the Jays acquired solid-hitting first baseman Lyle Overbay and right-handed pitching prospect Ty Taubenheim in a trade with the Milwaukee Brewers; with pitcher Dave Bush, pitching prospect Zach Jackson, and outfielder Gabe Gross going to Milwaukee. Glaus and Overbay were both introduced to the Toronto media together a few days later.

=== Season standings ===
AL East
Team	W	L	Pct.	GB	Home	Road
New York Yankees	95	67	.586	—	53‍–‍28	42‍–‍39
Boston Red Sox	95	67	.586	—	54‍–‍27	41‍–‍40
Toronto Blue Jays	80	82	.494	15	43‍–‍38	37‍–‍44
Baltimore Orioles	74	88	.457	21	36‍–‍45	38‍–‍43
Tampa Bay Devil Rays	67	95	.414	28	40‍–‍41	27‍–‍54

=== Record vs. opponents ===
2005 American League record Source: MLB Standings Grid – 2005
Team	BAL	BOS	CWS	CLE	DET	KC	LAA	MIN	NYY	OAK	SEA	TB	TEX	TOR	NL
Baltimore	—	8–10	2–6	1–6	3–5	4–2	2–4	3–3	7–11	4–6	7–3	12–6	4–6	9–10	8–10
Boston	10–8	—	4–3	4–2	6–4	4–2	6–4	4–2	9–10	6–4	3–3	13–6	7–2	7–11	12–6
Chicago	6–2	3–4	—	14–5	14–5	13–5	4–6	11–7	3–3	2–7	6–3	4–2	3–6	4–2	12–6
Cleveland	6–1	2–4	5–14	—	12–6	13–6	3–5	10–9	3–4	6–3	7–3	4–6	3–3	4–2	15–3
Detroit	5–3	4–6	5–14	6–12	—	10–9	4–6	8–11	1–5	1–5	5–4	5–2	4–2	4–3	9–9
Kansas City	2–4	2–4	5–13	6–13	9–10	—	2–7	6–13	3–3	2–4	2–7	3–5	2–8	3–6	9–9
Los Angeles	4–2	4–6	6–4	5–3	6–4	7–2	—	6–4	6–4	10–9	9–9	4–5	15–4	1–5	12–6
Minnesota	3–3	2–4	7–11	9–10	11–8	13–6	4–6	—	3–3	4–6	6–4	6–0	3–6	4–2	8–10
New York	11–7	10–9	3–3	4–3	5–1	3–3	4–6	3–3	—	7–2	7–3	8–11	7–3	12–6	11–7
Oakland	6–4	4–6	7–2	3–6	5–1	4–2	9–10	6–4	2–7	—	12–6	4–5	11–8	5–5	10–8
Seattle	3–7	3–3	3–6	3–7	4–5	7–2	9–9	4–6	3–7	6–12	—	4–2	6–13	4–6	10–8
Tampa Bay	6–12	6–13	2–4	6–4	2–5	5–3	5–4	0–6	11–8	5–4	2–4	—	6–2	8–11	3–15
Texas	6–4	2–7	6–3	3–3	2–4	8–2	4–15	6–3	3–7	8–11	13–6	2–6	—	7–3	9–9
Toronto	10–9	11–7	2–4	2–4	3–4	6–3	5–1	2–4	6–12	5–5	6–4	11–8	3–7	—	8–10

=== Transactions ===
Transactions for the Toronto Blue Jays during the 2005 regular season.

==== April 2005 ====
April 26	Greg Myers granted free agency.

==== May 2005 ====
May 11	Signed free agent Joe DePastino from the New York Yankees to a one-year contract.
May 14	Player rights of Ryan Glynn sold to the Oakland Athletics.
May 24	Eric Crozier selected off of waivers by the New York Yankees.

==== July 2005 ====
July 15	Justin Miller granted free agency.
July 22	Sent John McDonald to the Detroit Tigers as part of conditional deal. Signed free agent Kevin Tolar from the Arizona Diamondbacks to a one-year contract.

==== August 2005 ====
August 13	Signed free agent Desi Relaford from the Colorado Rockies to a one-year contract.

=== 2005 draft picks ===
The 2005 MLB draft was held on June 7–8.

Round	Pick	Player	Position	College/School	Nationality	Signed
1	6	Ricky Romero	LHP	Cal State Fullerton	(United States)	2005–06–16
3	86	Brian Pettway	OF	Ole Miss	(United States)	2005–06–27
4	161	Ryan Patterson	OF	Louisiana State	(United States)	2005–06–13
5	146	Eric Fowler	LHP	Ole Miss	(United States)	2005–06–18
6	176	Joshua Bell	C	Auburn	(United States)	2005–06–14
7	206	Robert Ray	LHP	Texas A&M	(United States)	2005–06–14
8	236	Jacob Butler	OF	Nevada	(United States)	2005–06–13
9	266	Paul Phillips	RHP	Oakland	(United States)	2005–06–13
10	296	Josh Sowers	RHP	Yale	(United States)	2005–06–13

=== Roster ===
2005 Toronto Blue Jays
Roster
Pitchers: 43 Miguel Batista; 49 Dave Bush; 39 Gustavo Chacín; 50 Vinnie Chulk; 37 Scott Downs; 54 Jason Frasor; 35 Chad Gaudin; 32 Roy Halladay; 22 Brandon League; 31 Ted Lilly; 28 Shaun Marcum; 40 Dustin McGowan; 34 Justin Miller; 60 Scott Schoeneweis; 30 Justin Speier; 7 Josh Towers; 41 Pete Walker; 48 Matt Whiteside	Catchers: 56 Andy Dominique; 20 Ken Huckaby; 28 Greg Myers; 16 Guillermo Quiróz; 9 Gregg Zaun; Infielders: 8 Russ Adams; 2 Aaron Hill; 29 Shea Hillenbrand; 11 Eric Hinske; 1 Orlando Hudson; 47 Corey Koskie; 6 John McDonald; 4 Frank Menechino	Outfielders: 27 Frank Catalanotto; 18 Gabe Gross; 3 Reed Johnson; 15 Alex Ríos; 10 Vernon Wells; Other batters: 24 John-Ford Griffin	Manager: 5 John Gibbons; Coaches: 38 Brad Arnsberg (pitching); 56 Mike Barnett (hitting); 14 Mickey Brantley (first base); 55 Brian Butterfield (third base); 52 Bruce Walton (bullpen); 12 Ernie Whitt (bench)

=== Game log ===
2005 Game Log
April: 13–12 (Home: 5–6; Away: 8–6)

#	Date	Opponent	Score	Win	Loss	Save	Attendance	Record
1	April 4	@ Devil Rays	5–2	Halladay (1–0)	Brazelton (0–1)	Batista (1)	26,018	1–0
2	April 5	@ Devil Rays	6–3	Chacín (1–0)	McClung (0–1)	Batista (2)	9,144	2–0
3	April 6	@ Devil Rays	8–5	Báez (1–0)	Schoeneweis (0–1)		8,764	2–1
4	April 8	Red Sox	6–5	Arroyo (1–0)	Bush (0–1)	Foulke (1)	50,560	2–2
5	April 9	Red Sox	12–5	Frasor (1–0)	Wells (0–2)		28,765	3–2
6	April 10	Red Sox	4–3	Batista (1–0)	Timlin (1–1)		22,845	4–2
7	April 11	@ Athletics	10–3	Chacín (2–0)	Saarloos (1–1)		44,815	5–2
8	April 12	@ Athletics	5–2	Towers (1–0)	Haren (0–1)	Batista (3)	10,106	6–2
9	April 13	@ Athletics	6–3	Calero (1–0)	Frasor (1–1)		15,860	6–3
10	April 14	@ Rangers	2–1	Halladay (2–0)	Astacio (0–1)		19,366	7–3
11	April 15	@ Rangers	4–2	Drese (1–1)	Lilly (0–1)	Cordero (4)	30,453	7–4
12	April 16	@ Rangers	8–0	Chacín (3–0)	Rogers (0–1)		40,499	8–4
13	April 17	@ Rangers	6–5	Young (1–1)	Towers (1–1)	Cordero (5)	31,310	8–5
14	April 18	@ Red Sox	12–7	Schilling (1–1)	Bush (0–2)		35,243	8–6
15	April 19	@ Red Sox	4–3	Halladay (3–0)	Foulke (1–2)	Batista (4)	35,598	9–6
16	April 20	Yankees	11–2	Pavano (1–2)	Lilly (0–2)		22,838	9–7
17	April 21	Yankees	4–3	Mussina (1–1)	Chacín (3–1)	Rivera (3)	23,178	9–8
18	April 22	Orioles	13–5	Williams (2–0)	Speier (0–1)		18,095	9–9
19	April 23	Orioles	4–1	Bédard (1–1)	Bush (0–3)		20,051	9–10
20	April 24	Orioles	7–1	Ponson (3–1)	Halladay (3–1)		20,566	9–11
21	April 26	Devil Rays	7–5	Lilly (1–2)	Brazelton (1–4)	Batista (5)	16,690	10–11
22	April 27	Devil Rays	8–2	Chacín (4–1)	Kazmir (0–2)		19,527	11–11
23	April 28	Devil Rays	7–4	Towers (2–1)	Waechter (0–1)	Batista (6)	21,409	12–11
24	April 29	@ Yankees	2–0	Halladay (4–1)	Johnson (2–2)		40,839	13–11
25	April 30	@ Yankees	4–3	Rivera (2–1)	Chulk (0–1)		47,483	13–12

May: 15–12 (Home: 9–6; Away: 6–6)

#	Date	Opponent	Score	Win	Loss	Save	Attendance	Record
26	May 1	@ Yankees	8–6	Walker (1–0)	Stanton (0–1)	Batista (7)	54,224	14–12
27	May 2	@ Orioles	6–2 (12)	Schoeneweis (1–1)	Williams (3–1)		15,641	15–12
28	May 3	@ Orioles	1–0	Towers (3–1)	Cabrera (1–2)	Batista (8)	17,934	16–12
29	May 4	@ Orioles	5–1	Bédard (3–1)	Halladay (4–2)		17,645	16–13
30	May 6	White Sox	5–3	Hernández (4–1)	Frasor (1–2)	Hermanson (5)	21,769	16–14
31	May 7	White Sox	10–7	Garland (6–0)	Lilly (1–3)		23,078	16–15
32	May 8	White Sox	5–4	Buehrle (5–1)	Chacín (4–2)	Marte (2)	20,946	16–16
33	May 9	Royals	6–1	Towers (4–1)	Hernández (1–5)		13,839	17–16
34	May 10	Royals	3–1	Halladay (5–2)	Greinke (0–4)		20,123	18–16
35	May 11	Royals	12–9	Batista (2–0)	Burgos (1–2)		24,402	19–16
36	May 13	@ Indians	6–4	Davis (2–1)	Lilly (1–4)	Wickman (10)	19,637	19–17
37	May 14	@ Indians	3–2	Rhodes (2–1)	Frasor (1–3)	Wickman (11)	22,525	19–18
38	May 15	@ Indians	5–2	Halladay (6–2)	Sabathia (2–3)		23,446	20–18
39	May 17	@ Twins	10–3	Towers (5–1)	Santana (5–2)		18,717	21–18
40	May 18	@ Twins	3–2	Lohse (3–2)	Bush (0–4)	Nathan (12)	23,929	21–19
41	May 19	@ Twins	4–0	Mays (3–1)	Chacín (4–3)		22,680	21–20
42	May 20	Nationals	6–1	Lilly (2–4)	Vargas (0–2)	Walker (1)	17,465	22–20
43	May 21	Nationals	7–0	Halladay (7–2)	Armas (1–2)		24,518	23–20
44	May 22	Nationals	9–2	Ohka (3–3)	Towers (5–2)		28,408	23–21
45	May 24	Red Sox	9–6	Batista (3–0)	Embree (1–2)		34,280	24–21
46	May 25	Red Sox	6–1	Lilly (3–4)	Arroyo (4–1)		23,221	25–21
47	May 26	Red Sox	8–1	Chacín (5–3)	Miller (1–1)	Walker (2)	26,255	26–21
48	May 27	Twins	7–2	Santana (6–2)	Towers (5–3)		18,702	26–22
49	May 28	Twins	4–3	Lohse (4–3)	Bush (0–5)	Nathan (15)	29,263	26–23
50	May 29	Twins	4–0	Halladay (8–2)	Mays (3–2)		24,287	27–23
51	May 30	@ Mariners	4–3	Moyer (5–2)	Lilly (3–5)	Guardado (14)	25,540	27–24
52	May 31	@ Mariners	9–7	Gaudin (1–0)	Franklin (2–7)	Batista (9)	25,737	28–24

June: 12–15 (Home: 6–4; Away: 6–11)

#	Date	Opponent	Score	Win	Loss	Save	Attendance	Record
53	June 1	@ Mariners	3–0	Meche (5–3)	Chacín (5–4)	Guardado (15)	24,815	28–25
54	June 2	@ Athletics	5–3	Saarloos (2–4)	Towers (5–4)	Street (1)	10,637	28–26
55	June 3	@ Athletics	6–2	Halladay (9–2)	Glynn (0–1)		12,332	29–26
56	June 4	@ Athletics	5–2	Blanton (1–5)	Lilly (3–6)	Street (2)	25,273	29–27
57	June 5	@ Athletics	12–4	Haren (3–7)	Gaudin (1–1)		28,754	29–28
58	June 6	@ Cubs	4–1	Chacín (6–4)	Koronka (1–1)	Batista (10)	38,807	30–28
59	June 7	@ Cubs	6–4	Schoeneweis (2–1)	Wellemeyer (1–1)	Batista (11)	39,159	31–28
60	June 8	@ Cubs	2–0	Mitre (1–1)	Halladay (9–3)	Dempster (7)	38,086	31–29
61	June 10	@ Astros	4–2	Rodríguez (2–2)	Lilly (3–7)	Lidge (16)	28,607	31–30
62	June 11	@ Astros	6–3	Lidge (2–2)	Schoeneweis (2–2)		34,925	31–31
63	June 12	@ Astros	3–0	Oswalt (7–7)	Towers (5–5)		30,584	31–32
64	June 13	Cardinals	4–1	Halladay (10–3)	Suppan (5–6)		20,032	32–32
65	June 14	Cardinals	7–0	Carpenter (9–4)	Gaudin (1–2)		37,536	32–33
66	June 15	Cardinals	5–2	Lilly (4–7)	Marquis (8–4)	Batista (12)	22,905	33–33
67	June 17	Brewers	9–5	Walker (2–0)	Davis (8–6)		17,615	34–33
68	June 18	Brewers	5–2	Sheets (3–6)	Halladay (10–4)	Phelps (1)	25,264	34–34
69	June 19	Brewers	5–2	Capuano (6–6)	Towers (5–6)	Turnbow (11)	30,480	34–35
70	June 20	Orioles	11–2	Lilly (5–7)	Chen (6–5)		15,849	35–35
71	June 21	Orioles	9–5	López (7–2)	Chacín (6–5)		17,884	35–36
72	June 22	Orioles	3–2	Walker (3–0)	Cabrera (5–7)	Batista (13)	20,617	36–36
73	June 23	Orioles	6–2	Halladay (11–4)	Ponson (7–5)		22,390	37–36
74	June 24	@ Nationals	3–0	Loaiza (3–5)	Towers (5–7)	Cordero (24)	36,689	37–37
75	June 25	@ Nationals	5–2	Hernández (11–2)	Lilly (5–8)	Cordero (25)	39,881	37–38
76	June 26	@ Nationals	9–5	Speier (1–1)	Ayala (6–4)	Batista (14)	33,557	38–38
77	June 27	@ Devil Rays	4–3	Nomo (5–6)	Walker (3–1)	Báez (13)	8,779	38–39
78	June 28	@ Devil Rays	3–1 (11)	Batista (4–0)	Waechter (3–6)		8,545	39–39
79	June 29	@ Devil Rays	12–3	Towers (6–7)	Hendrickson (3–5)		20,267	40–39

July: 13–12 (Home: 10–7; Away: 3–5)

#	Date	Opponent	Score	Win	Loss	Save	Attendance	Record
80	July 1	@ Red Sox	15–2	Lilly (6–8)	Clement (9–2)		35,302	41–39
81	July 2	@ Red Sox	6–4	Timlin (3–1)	Walker (3–2)	Foulke (15)	35,268	41–40
82	July 3	@ Red Sox	5–2	Halladay (12–4)	Arroyo (6–5)	Schoeneweis (1)	34,794	42–40
83	July 5	Athletics	10–7 (11)	Duchscherer (4–1)	Batista (4–1)		21,667	42–41
84	July 6	Athletics	8–0	Lilly (7–8)	Blanton (5–7)		21,208	43–41
85	July 7	Athletics	4–2	Chacín (7–5)	Harden (5–4)	Batista (15)	22,339	44–41
86	July 8	@ Rangers	7–6	Cordero (1–1)	Batista (4–2)		30,242	44–42
87	July 9	@ Rangers	12–10	Rogers (10–4)	Downs (0–1)	Cordero (20)	36,285	44–43
88	July 10	@ Rangers	9–8	Loe (3–1)	Frasor (1–4)		25,767	44–44
89	July 14	Devil Rays	3–0	Fossum (4–7)	Lilly (7–9)	Báez (14)	20,010	44–45
90	July 15	Devil Rays	11–6	Chacín (8–5)	Nomo (5–8)		20,841	45–45
91	July 16	Devil Rays	6–5	Hendrickson (4–6)	Towers (6–8)	Báez (15)	24,801	45–46
92	July 17	Devil Rays	5–4	Orvella (1–1)	Batista (4–3)	Báez (16)	25,198	45–47
93	July 19	Mariners	12–10	Lilly (8–9)	Sele (6–10)	Batista (16)	20,516	46–47
94	July 20	Mariners	9–4	Chacín (9–5)	Franklin (5–11)		28,801	47–47
95	July 21	Mariners	6–3	Towers (7–8)	Piñeiro (3–6)	Batista (17)	26,837	48–47
96	July 22	@ Royals	5–3	Hernández (8–9)	Walker (3–3)	MacDougal (14)	20,958	48–48
97	July 23	@ Royals	9–4	Bush (1–5)	Snyder (0–1)		26,626	49–48
98	July 24	@ Royals	6–5	Carrasco (5–4)	Gaudin (1–3)	MacDougal (15)	10,994	49–49
99	July 26	Angels	8–0	Chacín (10–5)	Byrd (9–7)		18,754	50–49
100	July 27	Angels	3–2 (10)	Batista (5–3)	Donnelly (6–3)		18,998	51–49
101	July 28	Angels	2–1 (18)	Walker (4–3)	Shields (6–6)		19,706	52–49
102	July 29	Rangers	4–1	Brocail (4–2)	Downs (0–2)	Cordero (25)	21,113	52–50
103	July 30	Rangers	3–2	Benoit (3–1)	Frasor (1–5)	Cordero (26)	23,039	52–51
104	July 31	Rangers	5–1	Chacín (11–5)	Wilson (0–3)		24,123	53–51

August: 13–15 (Home: 6–6; Away: 7–9)

#	Date	Opponent	Score	Win	Loss	Save	Attendance	Record
105	August 2	@ White Sox	7–3	Towers (8–8)	Garland (15–5)		32,162	54–51
106	August 3	@ White Sox	4–3	Bush (2–5)	Hernández (8–4)	Batista (18)	28,116	55–51
107	August 4	@ White Sox	5–4	Vizcaíno (5–5)	Speier (1–2)	Hermanson (26)	32,027	55–52
108	August 5	Yankees	6–2	Small (3–0)	Chacín (11–6)	Rivera (28)	43,688	55–53
109	August 6	Yankees	8–5	Walker (5–3)	Johnson (11–7)		48,088	56–53
110	August 7	Yankees	6–2	Leiter (2–3)	Towers (8–9)	Rivera (29)	46,114	56–54
111	August 8	Tigers	9–8 (12)	Darensbourg (1–0)	Schoeneweis (2–3)	Dingman (2)	20,887	56–55
112	August 9	Tigers	6–4	McGowan (1–0)	Douglass (4–2)	Batista (19)	21,145	57–55
113	August 10	Tigers	4–3	Speier (2–2)	Dingman (0–1)		24,624	58–55
114	August 11	Tigers	2–1	Downs (1–2)	Bonderman (13–9)	Batista (20)	30,578	59–55
115	August 12	@ Orioles	12–0	Towers (9–9)	Cabrera (8–11)		29,069	60–55
116	August 13	@ Orioles	1–0	Maine (1–0)	Bush (2–6)	Ryan (26)	29,445	60–56
117	August 14	@ Orioles	7–6	Frasor (2–5)	Byrdak (0–1)	Batista (21)	30,954	61–56
118	August 15	@ Angels	5–4 (11)	Shields (8–8)	Walker (5–4)		38,936	61–57
119	August 16	@ Angels	4–3	League (1–0)	Rodríguez (2–3)	Batista (22)	42,468	62–57
120	August 17	@ Angels	4–1	Towers (10–9)	Washburn (6–7)	Batista (23)	43,026	63–57
121	August 19	@ Tigers	9–5	Maroth (11–11)	Bush (2–7)	Dingman (3)	32,769	63–58
122	August 20	@ Tigers	3–2 (13)	Germán (4–0)	Batista (5–4)		38,073	63–59
123	August 21	@ Tigers	17–6	Douglass (5–2)	McGowan (1–1)		36,818	63–60
124	August 22	@ Yankees	7–0	Wright (4–2)	Downs (1–3)		50,162	63–61
125	August 23	@ Yankees	5–4	Rivera (6–3)	Batista (5–5)		50,528	63–62
126	August 24	@ Yankees	9–5	Bush (3–7)	Mussina (12–8)		54,705	64–62
127	August 25	@ Yankees	6–2	Chacón (3–1)	Chacín (11–7)		54,329	64–63
128	August 26	Indians	9–3	Sabathia (11–9)	McGowan (1–2)		24,649	64–64
129	August 27	Indians	2–1	Downs (2–3)	Millwood (7–11)	Batista (24)	27,630	65–64
130	August 28	Indians	4–1	Westbrook (13–13)	Towers (10–10)	Wickman (34)	31,785	65–65
131	August 30	Orioles	7–2	Bush (4–7)	López (13–8)		25,311	66–65
132	August 31	Orioles	7–0	Chen (11–8)	Chacín (11–8)		24,686	66–66

September: 13–15 (Home: 6–9; Away: 7–6)

#	Date	Opponent	Score	Win	Loss	Save	Attendance	Record
133	September 1	Orioles	5–3	Penn (3–2)	McGowan (1–3)	Ryan (29)	20,928	66–67
134	September 2	Devil Rays	4–3	Schoeneweis (3–3)	Borowski (1–2)	Batista (25)	15,108	67–67
135	September 3	Devil Rays	3–2	McClung (6–8)	Batista (5–6)	Báez (32)	18,841	67–68
136	September 4	Devil Rays	1–0	Kazmir (8–9)	Bush (4–8)	Báez (33)	20,679	67–69
137	September 5	@ Orioles	6–2	Chacín (12–8)	Chen (11–9)		22,123	68–69
138	September 6	@ Orioles	5–0	Cabrera (9–11)	Lilly (8–10)		20,729	68–70
139	September 7	@ Orioles	7–4	Walker (6–4)	Julio (3–5)	Batista (26)	20,146	69–70
140	September 9	@ Devil Rays	7–2	Towers (11–10)	McClung (6–9)		10,092	70–70
141	September 10	@ Devil Rays	3–2	Bush (5–8)	Báez (5–4)	Batista (27)	10,984	71–70
142	September 11	@ Devil Rays	6–5 (11)	Harper (3–6)	Schoeneweis (3–4)		10,590	71–71
143	September 12	Red Sox	6–5 (11)	Papelbon (1–1)	Walker (6–5)		24,617	71–72
144	September 13	Red Sox	9–3	Downs (3–3)	Clement (13–5)		25,253	72–72
145	September 14	Red Sox	5–3	Wells (13–7)	Towers (11–11)	Timlin (8)	25,865	72–73
146	September 16	Yankees	11–10	Proctor (1–0)	Bush (5–9)	Rivera (40)	36,543	72–74
147	September 17	Yankees	1–0	Chacón (5–3)	Chacín (12–9)	Gordon (1)	43,433	72–75
148	September 18	Yankees	6–5	Lilly (9–10)	Wright (5–3)	Batista (28)	39,891	73–75
149	September 19	Mariners	7–5	Sherrill (4–2)	Batista (5–7)	Guardado (32)	18,762	73–76
150	September 20	Mariners	6–4	Towers (12–11)	Harris (2–5)	Frasor (1)	19,002	74–76
151	September 21	Mariners	3–2	Hernández (4–4)	Bush (5–10)	Guardado (33)	21,469	74–77
152	September 22	Mariners	7–5	Speier (3–2)	Piñeiro (7–10)	Batista (29)	23,118	75–77
153	September 23	@ Yankees	5–0	Chacón (6–3)	Lilly (9–11)		53,175	75–78
154	September 24	@ Yankees	7–4	Downs (4–3)	Wright (5–4)	Batista (30)	53,911	76–78
155	September 25	@ Yankees	8–4	Wang (8–4)	Towers (12–12)	Rivera (42)	55,136	76–79
--	September 26	@ Red Sox	Postponed (rain) Rescheduled for September 27					
156	September 27	@ Red Sox	3–1	Wakefield (16–11)	Bush (5–11)	Timlin (12)	35,700	76–80
157	September 27	@ Red Sox	7–5	Frasor (3–5)	Bradford (2–1)	Batista (31)	35,476	77–80
158	September 28	@ Red Sox	7–2	Lilly (10–11)	Arroyo (14–10)		35,313	78–80
159	September 29	@ Red Sox	5–4	Papelbon (3–1)	Batista (5–8)		35,345	78–81
160	September 30	Royals	10–1	Towers (13–12)	Greinke (5–17)		23,381	79–81

October: 1–1 (Home: 1–1; Away: 0–0)

#	Date	Opponent	Score	Win	Loss	Save	Attendance	Record
161	October 1	Royals	7–6	Burgos (3–5)	Walker (6–6)	MacDougal (21)	28,271	79–82
162	October 2	Royals	7–2	Chacín (13–9)	Hernández (8–14)		37,046	80–82

== Player stats ==
= Indicates team leader

=== Batting ===
==== Starters by position ====
Note: Pos = Position; G = Games played; AB = At bats; H = Hits; Avg. = Batting average; HR = Home runs; RBI = Runs batted in

Pos	Player	G	AB	H	Avg.	HR	RBI
C	Gregg Zaun	133	434	109	.251	11	61
1B	Eric Hinske	147	477	125	.262	15	68
2B	Orlando Hudson	131	461	125	.271	10	63
SS	Russ Adams	139	481	123	.256	8	63
3B	Corey Koskie	97	354	88	.249	11	36
LF	Frank Catalanotto	130	419	126	.301	8	59
CF	Vernon Wells	156	620	167	.269	28	97
RF	Alex Ríos	146	481	126	.262	10	59
DH	Aaron Hill	105	361	99	.274	3	40

==== Other batters ====
Note: G = Games played; AB = At bats; H = Hits; Avg. = Batting average; HR = Home runs; RBI = Runs batted in

Player	G	AB	H	Avg.	HR	RBI
Shea Hillenbrand	152	594	173	.291	18	82
Reed Johnson	142	398	107	.269	8	58
Frank Menechino	70	148	32	.216	4	13
John McDonald	37	93	27	.290	0	12
Gabe Gross	40	92	23	.250	1	7
Ken Huckaby	35	87	18	.207	0	6
Guillermo Quiróz	12	36	7	.194	0	4
John-Ford Griffin	7	13	4	.308	1	6
Greg Myers	6	12	1	.083	0	1
Andy Dominique	2	2	0	.000	0	0

=== Pitching ===
==== Starting pitchers ====
Note: G = Games pitched; IP = Innings pitched; W = Wins; L = Losses; ERA = Earned run average; SO = Strikeouts

Player	G	IP	W	L	ERA	SO
Josh Towers	33	208.2	13	12	3.71	112
Gustavo Chacin	34	203.0	13	9	3.72	121
Roy Halladay	19	141.2	12	4	2.41	108
Dave Bush	25	136.1	5	11	4.49	75
Ted Lilly	25	126.1	10	11	5.56	96

==== Other pitchers ====
Note: G = Games pitched; IP = Innings pitched; W = Wins; L = Losses; ERA = Earned run average; SO = Strikeouts

Player	G	IP	W	L	ERA	SO
Scott Downs	26	94.0	4	3	4.31	75
Dustin McGowan	13	45.1	1	3	6.35	34
Chad Gaudin	5	13.0	1	3	13.15	12

==== Relief pitchers ====
Note: G = Games pitched; W = Wins; L = Losses; SV = Saves; ERA = Earned run average; SO = Strikeouts

Player	G	W	L	SV	ERA	SO
Miguel Batista	71	5	8	31	4.10	54
Scott Schoeneweis	80	3	4	1	3.32	43
Jason Frasor	67	3	5	1	3.25	62
Justin Speier	65	3	2	0	2.57	56
Vinnie Chulk	62	0	1	0	3.88	39
Pete Walker	41	6	6	2	3.54	43
Brandon League	20	1	0	0	6.56	17
Shaun Marcum	5	0	0	0	0.00	4
Matt Whiteside	2	0	0	0	19.64	5
Justin Miller	1	0	0	0	15.43	2

== Award winners ==
- Vernon Wells, Gold Glove Award

All-Star Game

- Roy Halladay, pitcher
- Shea Hillenbrand, designated hitter

== Farm system ==
Level	Team	League	Manager
AAA	Syracuse SkyChiefs	International League	Marty Pevey
AA	New Hampshire Fisher Cats	Eastern League	Mike Basso
A	Dunedin Blue Jays	Florida State League	Omar Malavé
A	Lansing Lugnuts	Midwest League	Ken Joyce
A-Short Season	Auburn Doubledays	New York–Penn League	Dennis Holmberg
Rookie	Pulaski Blue Jays	Appalachian League	Dave Pano
