= John Gibbons =

American baseball manager and coach (born 1962)

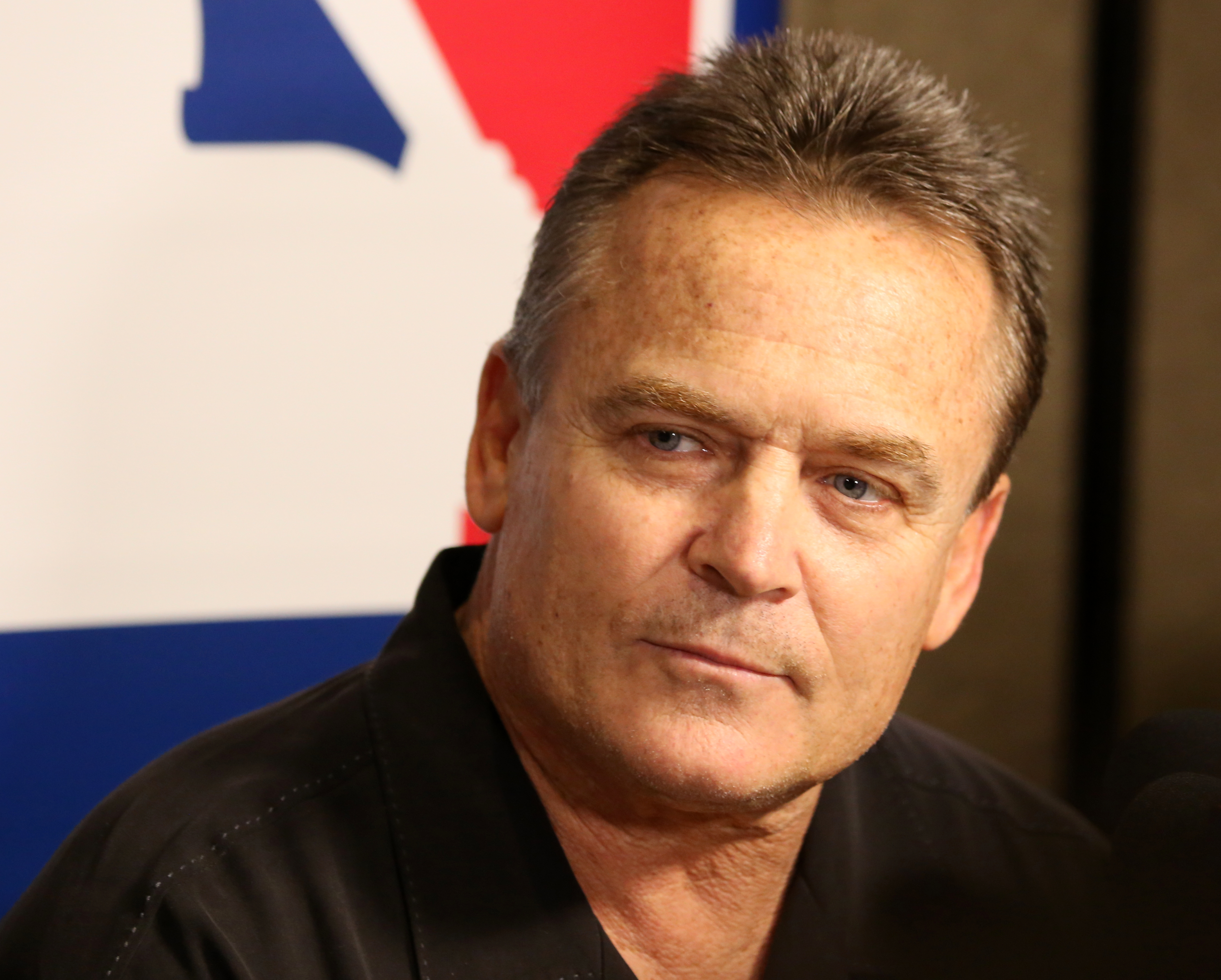
- Gibbons in 2015

Los Angeles Angels – No. 85
- Catcher / Manager / Coach
- Born: June 8, 1962 (age 64); Great Falls, Montana, U.S.
- Batted: Right Threw: Right

MLB debut
- April 11, 1984, for the New York Mets

Last MLB appearance
- October 4, 1986, for the New York Mets

MLB statistics
- Batting average: .220
- Home runs: 1
- Runs batted in: 2
- Managerial record: 793–789
- Winning %: .501
- Stats at Baseball Reference

Teams
- As player: New York Mets (1984, 1986); As manager: Toronto Blue Jays (2004–2008, 2013–2018); As coach: Toronto Blue Jays (2002–2004); Kansas City Royals (2009–2011); New York Mets (2024–2025); Los Angeles Angels (2026–present)

Career highlights and awards
- World Series champion (1986)

John Michael Gibbons (born June 8, 1962) is an American professional baseball coach, manager and former player who is the bench coach for the Los Angeles Angels of Major League Baseball (MLB). He played in MLB as a catcher with the New York Mets in 1984 and 1986.

Gibbons became a coach for the Toronto Blue Jays in 2002 and then became manager in 2004. He was fired during the 2008 season. He coached for the Kansas City Royals from 2009 to 2011 and managed in the minor leagues in 2012 before managing the Blue Jays again from 2013 to 2018. He last served as the bench coach for the New York Mets from 2024 to 2025.

== Early life ==
Gibbons was born in Great Falls, Montana, and raised in San Antonio, Texas, where he attended Douglas MacArthur High School. The son of United States Air Force colonel William Gibbons, he had his first Little League Baseball at-bat while playing in Happy Valley-Goose Bay, Labrador, Canada, where the family lived temporarily.

== Playing career ==
Gibbons was selected by the New York Mets with the 24th overall pick of the 1980 amateur draft. He spent the next three years moving up through the Mets minor-league system. In 1984, he was considered to be the Mets' top catching prospect, and was set to start the season in the majors. However, a collision with the Phillies' Joe Lefebvre in late March landed him on the 15-day disabled list. He eventually started six games at catcher in April 1984, but batted only .040 in that stretch. He went back on the disabled list with a sore arm at the end of April, and was sent back to AAA Tidewater after that.

Gibbons was next called up to the majors in the 1986 Mets season. He appeared in 8 games and batted .474 (9 for 19), but the Mets already had the majors' best catcher in Gary Carter and an established backup in Ed Hearn. Gibbons served as the Mets' bullpen catcher during the 1986 postseason, and earned a World Series ring when the Mets won the World Series.

Gibbons spent the next four seasons on five different AAA teams. He retired as a player after the 1990 season.

== Coaching and managerial career ==
=== Minor leagues ===
Gibbons began his coaching career with the Mets in 1990 as a minor league roving catching instructor. In 1994, he joined the Mets' South Atlantic League franchise, the Capital City Bombers, as a hitting coach.

Gibbons began his minor-league managing career in the Mets' organization with the Kingsport Mets, guiding them to the Appalachian League championship in 1995. He followed that by guiding the St. Lucie Mets to the Florida State League title the next season. In 1998, he led the Eastern League's Binghamton Mets to the playoffs, and then followed that with three seasons as manager of the Norfolk Tides. He led the Tides to the International League playoffs in 2001.

=== Toronto Blue Jays (2002–2008) ===
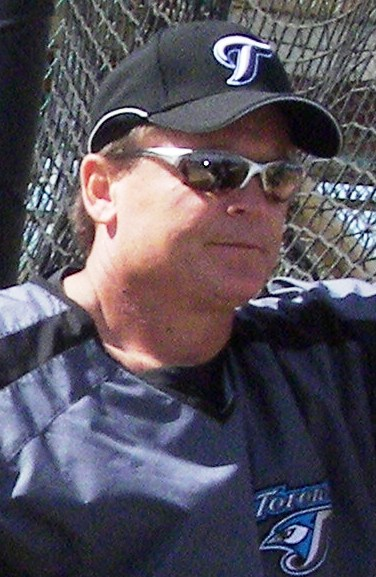
Gibbons in 2007 with the Blue Jays

Hired by the Toronto Blue Jays' former general manager J. P. Ricciardi in 2002, as a bullpen catcher, Gibbons worked his way up to first base coach in June 2002. Ricciardi was his former roommate in the minor leagues.

After Ricciardi fired manager Carlos Tosca in 2004, Gibbons was promoted to the manager position. The Blue Jays went 20–30 with Gibbons at the helm.

At the end of the 2004 regular season, Gibbons signed a one-year contract as the manager for the 2005 season. He was later given a two-year contract extension just a week into the 2005 season. Gibbons went on to lead the Jays to an 80–82 record in his first full season as a big league manager.

Expectations were higher in 2006, after the Blue Jays acquired A. J. Burnett, Troy Glaus, Lyle Overbay, B. J. Ryan, and Bengie Molina. Toronto ended the season in second place in the American League East division with an 87–75 record, one game ahead of the Boston Red Sox. Although they finished 10 games out of first, it was the first time the Jays had finished higher than third since 1993, when they won their second of two consecutive World Series titles.

With the Blue Jays mired in a slump that put them five games below .500, Gibbons was fired on June 20, 2008. He was replaced by former Jays manager Cito Gaston. He finished with a record of 305 wins and 305 losses.

=== Kansas City Royals and San Antonio Missions (2009–2012) ===
On October 10, 2008, Gibbons was hired as the bench coach by the Kansas City Royals, replacing Dave Owen, who became the third base coach.

Gibbons was hired at the end of the 2011 season to manage the San Diego Padres' Double-A affiliate, the San Antonio Missions.

=== Second stint with Toronto (2013–2018) ===
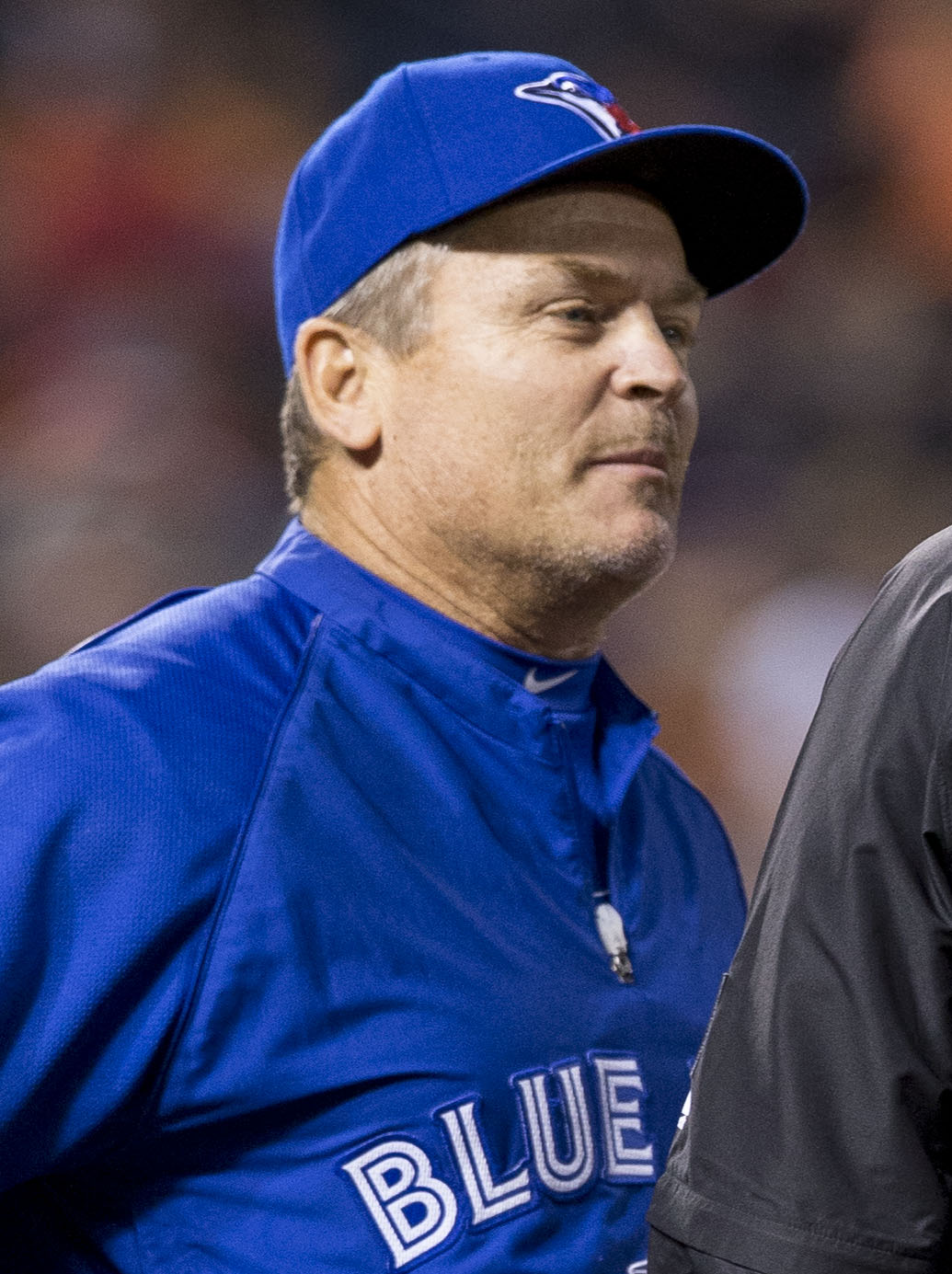
Gibbons in 2014

On November 20, 2012, the Blue Jays re-hired Gibbons as their manager on a two–year rolling contract. Gibbons was named to the 2013 American League All-Star coaching staff by Detroit Tigers manager Jim Leyland. The Blue Jays finished the 2013 season with a 74–88 record, putting them last in the AL East.

The Blue Jays were six games up in the AL East title race on June 6, 2014, but posted a 45–54 record from that point on, including a 9–17 record in August. They would finish the season with a record of 83–79, good enough for third place in the AL East, and five games back of a wild card spot.

On June 22, 2015, the Blue Jays defeated the Tampa Bay Rays 8–5 for Gibbons' 500th managerial win. On August 2, Gibbons was ejected for the third time in the 2015 season, for arguing with umpire Jim Wolf. Gibbons returned to the field later in the game during a bench-clearing incident, and was subsequently suspended for one game. On September 25, Gibbons and the Blue Jays ended the team's 22-year playoff drought by clinching a playoff berth. Five days later, the Blue Jays defeated the Baltimore Orioles 15–2, and clinched the American League East. On October 14, 2015, the Blue Jays defeated the Texas Rangers to win the American League Division Series after losing the first two games of the series. The Blue Jays moved on to play in their first American League Championship Series since 1993. They were defeated by the eventual World Series champions, the Kansas City Royals, in six games.

On April 5, 2016, after a 3–2 loss to the Tampa Bay Rays ended on a questionable slide by José Bautista which was ruled as a double play, Gibbons stated, "Maybe we'll come out and wear dresses tomorrow. Maybe that's what everybody's looking for." A day later, after he received criticism for his initial comment, he said that "the world needs to lighten up a little bit". On May 17, Gibbons was suspended three games by Major League Baseball for his role in a benches-clearing incident between the Blue Jays and Texas Rangers on May 15 involving Rangers infielder Rougned Odor and Blue Jays outfielder José Bautista. On September 11, Gibbons was ejected for the eighth time in the 2016 season, tying the team's single-season record set by Bobby Cox; he led the major leagues in 2016. In 2016, he was successful on a lower percentage of replay challenges than any other MLB manager with 10 or more challenges, at 38.8%. The Blue Jays made the playoffs for the second consecutive season, and defeated Baltimore in the Wild Card Game to advance. In the Division Series, the Blue Jays swept the Texas Rangers in three games. Toronto was eliminated by the Cleveland Indians in the Championship Series, four games to one.

On April 1, 2017, Gibbons signed a two-year extension with the Blue Jays, that also included an option for the 2020 season. In 2017, he was again successful on a lower percentage of replay challenges than any other MLB manager with 10 or more challenges, at 26.7%.

On September 26, 2018, it was confirmed by the Blue Jays that Gibbons would not return for the 2019 season. Toronto mayor John Tory proclaimed the 26th as "John Gibbons Day" in Toronto, noting Gibbons' "tremendous contributions to the Toronto Blue Jays franchise." His final game was a 9–4 loss to the Tampa Bay Rays. The Blue Jays finished the 2018 season with a 73–89 record. In 2018 he was ejected seven times, more than any other manager in the major leagues. During his second stint as Blue Jays manager, he finished with a record of 488 wins and 484 losses. Overall, Gibbons has a 793–789 record from both stints as Blue Jays manager.

=== New York Mets ===
On November 22, 2023, it was announced that Gibbons was expected to be hired as the bench coach of the New York Mets. Gibbons announced his departure from the Mets in 2025, after two seasons in the role.

=== Los Angeles Angels ===
On November 22, 2025, the Los Angeles Angels hired Gibbons to serve as their bench coach under new manager Kurt Suzuki.

=== Managerial record ===
As of games played on September 30, 2018

Team	Year	Regular season					Postseason			
Team	Year	Games	Won	Lost	Win %	Finish	Won	Lost	Win %	Result
TOR	2004	50	20	30	.400	5th in AL East	–	–	–	–
TOR	2005	162	80	82	.494	3rd in AL East	–	–	–	–
TOR	2006	162	87	75	.537	2nd in AL East	–	–	–	–
TOR	2007	162	83	79	.512	3rd in AL East	–	–	–	–
TOR	2008	74	35	39	.473	fired	–	–	–	–
TOR	2013	162	74	88	.457	5th in AL East	–	–	–	–
TOR	2014	162	83	79	.512	3rd in AL East	–	–	–	–
TOR	2015	162	93	69	.574	1st in AL East	5	6	.455	Lost ALCS (KC)
TOR	2016	162	89	73	.549	2nd in AL East	5	4	.556	Lost ALCS (CLE)
TOR	2017	162	76	86	.469	4th in AL East	–	–	–	–
TOR	2018	162	73	89	.451	4th in AL East	–	–	–	–
Total		1582	793	789	.501		10	10	.500	

Sporting positions
Preceded by Dave Owen	Kansas City Royals Bench Coach; 2009–2011	Succeeded by Chino Cadahia
