= Ty Taubenheim =

American baseball player (born 1982)

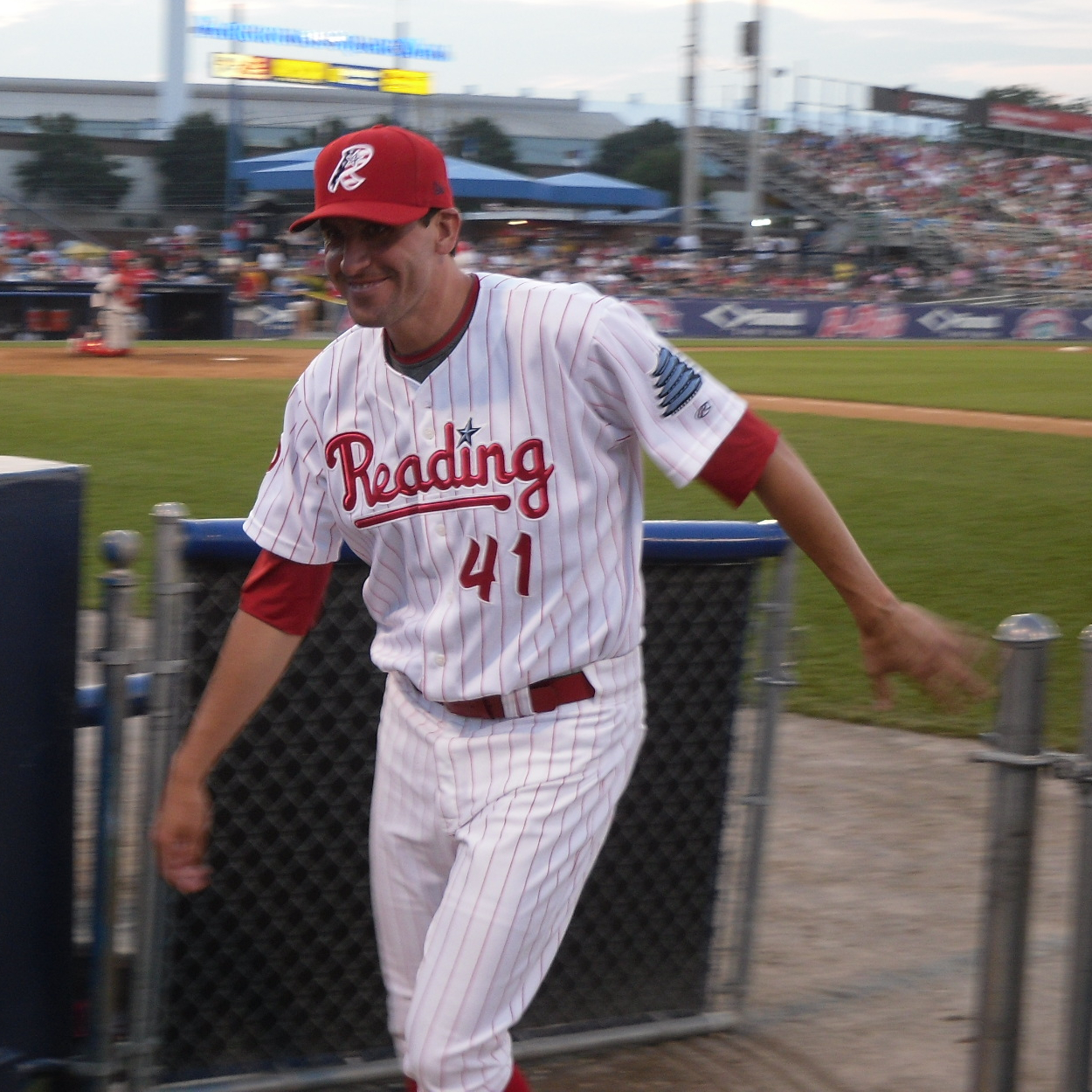
- Taubenheim with the Reading Phillies, double-A affiliates of the Philadelphia Phillies, in 2010.
- Pitcher
- Born: November 17, 1982 (age 43); Bellingham, Washington, U.S.
- Batted: Right Threw: Right

MLB debut
- May 20, 2006, for the Toronto Blue Jays

Last MLB appearance
- June 28, 2008, for the Pittsburgh Pirates

MLB statistics
- Win–loss record: 1–5
- Earned run average: 5.09
- Strikeouts: 34
- Stats at Baseball Reference

Teams
- Toronto Blue Jays (2006–2007); Pittsburgh Pirates (2008)

Ty Andrew Taubenheim (born November 17, 1982) is an American former pitcher in Major League Baseball. He is 6'6", 250 lb (110 kg)., and throws and bats right-handed. Taubenheim features a 90 mph (140 km/h) sinking fastball, a slider, and a changeup.

== Playing career ==
Taubenheim was drafted in the 19th round of the 2003 Major League Baseball draft by the Milwaukee Brewers.

He was acquired by the Toronto Blue Jays from the Brewers along with Lyle Overbay for Dave Bush, Zach Jackson, and Gabe Gross on December 7, 2005.

Taubenheim made his major league debut with the Blue Jays in 2006, but finished the year 0–5 as a starter. He earned his first win in a relief appearance against the Atlanta Braves on June 22, 2006, pitching just 0.2 innings and allowing one hit, but no runs.

He was claimed off waivers by the Pittsburgh Pirates from the Blue Jays after the 2007 season.

Taubenheim was released by the Pirates on September 2, 2008, to make room on the 40-man roster for infielder Luis Cruz, but was re-signed to a minor league contract in January 2009.

On March 31, 2010, Taubenheim signed a minor league contract with the Philadelphia Phillies.

On July 25, 2010, the Reading Phillies of the Eastern League announced Taubenheim had been assigned from Lehigh Valley of the International League.

Taubenheim signed a major league contract with the Texas Rangers in January 2011, but was released before the season began.
