= Zach Jackson (pitcher, born 1983) =

American baseball player (born 1983)

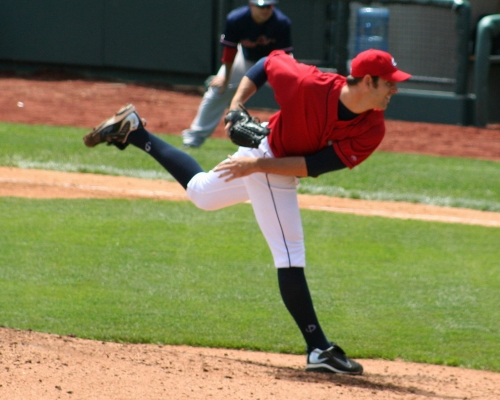
- Jackson pitching for the Columbus Clippers in 2009
- Pitcher
- Born: May 13, 1983 (age 43); Greensburg, Pennsylvania, U.S.
- Batted: Left Threw: Left

MLB debut
- June 4, 2006, for the Milwaukee Brewers

Last MLB appearance
- May 27, 2009, for the Cleveland Indians

MLB statistics
- Win–loss record: 4–5
- Earned run average: 5.81
- Strikeouts: 63
- Stats at Baseball Reference

Teams
- Milwaukee Brewers (2006, 2008); Cleveland Indians (2008–2009)

Zachary Thomas Jackson (born May 13, 1983) is an American former professional baseball pitcher. He played in Major League Baseball (MLB) for the Milwaukee Brewers and Cleveland Indians.

== Amateur career ==
Jackson was originally drafted by the Chicago White Sox in the 50th round (1,482nd overall) of the 2001 Major League Baseball draft, but did not sign. He attended Texas A&M University, and in 2003, he played collegiate summer baseball with the Hyannis Mets of the Cape Cod Baseball League, where he was named a league all-star. After his junior year, Jackson was selected by the Toronto Blue Jays in the first round (32nd overall) of the 2004 Major League Baseball draft.

== Professional career ==
=== Toronto Blue Jays ===
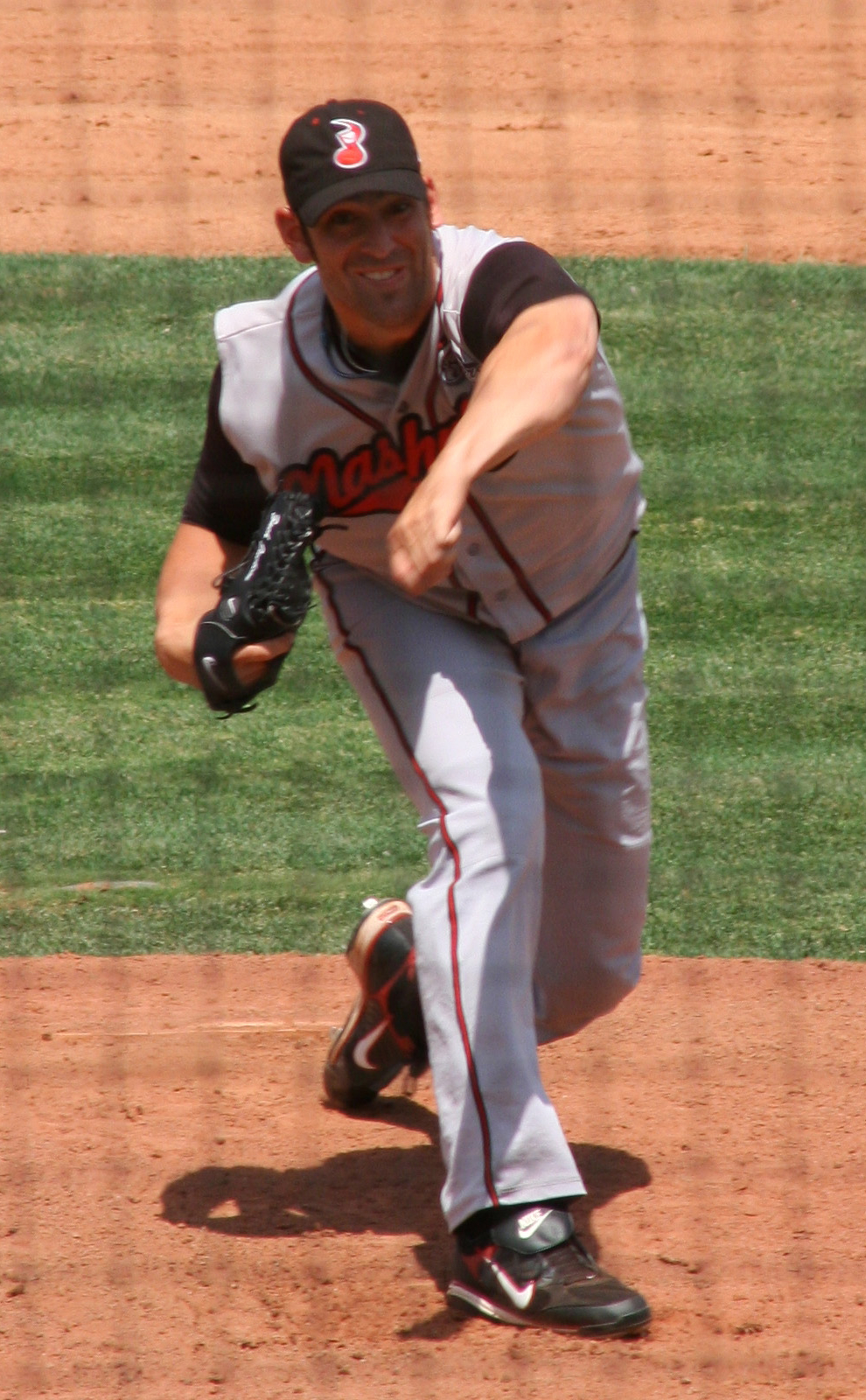
Jackson during his tenure with the Nashville Sounds, Triple-A affiliates of the Milwaukee Brewers, in 2008.

On July 20, 2004, Jackson signed with the Blue Jays. He began his career with the Single-A Auburn Doubledays, posting a 5.40 ERA in four starts. In 2005, his first full season in the Blue Jays organization, Jackson made the leap from Single-A to Triple-A. He made 27 minor league starts, posting a combined 16–8 record and a 3.92 ERA across three levels of baseball.

=== Milwaukee Brewers ===
On December 7, 2005, Jackson was traded along with Dave Bush and Gabe Gross to the Milwaukee Brewers for Lyle Overbay and Ty Taubenheim. The Brewers assigned Jackson to the Triple-A Nashville Sounds at the beginning of the 2006 season. He pitched well to start the season, and had a 3.00 ERA for the first month and a half. The Brewers called Jackson up on June 2 to help with their current pitching problems. He made his major league debut on June 4 against the Washington Nationals, tossing a perfect ninth inning while striking out two in an 8–4 loss. Three days later, Jackson made his first MLB start against the San Diego Padres. He pitched 6 1/3 innings, allowing four runs (two earned) on 10 hits while walking one and striking out two in a no decision. Jackson filled a major void left by the injured Tomo Ohka, replacing him in the starting rotation. He appeared in eight games (seven starts) with Milwaukee, going 2–2 with a 5.40 ERA.

At the start of the 2007 season, Jackson was sent down to Triple-A Nashville to fine-tune his game, and he spent the entire year with the Sounds, finishing 11–10 with a 4.46 ERA in 29 games (28 starts). He finished among the Pacific Coast League leaders in innings pitched (169 2/3, second), starts (28, tied for second), and strikeouts (123, third).

Jackson began the 2008 season with Nashville, but was recalled to the majors on May 16. He appeared in two games with Milwaukee, posting a 4.91 ERA before being sent back to Nashville on May 27.

=== Cleveland Indians ===
On July 7, 2008, Jackson was part of the deal that sent Cy Young Award winner CC Sabathia to Milwaukee for left fielder Matt LaPorta, pitcher Rob Bryson, and Michael Brantley. Jackson was recalled in August 2008 to fill the starting pitcher spot vacated by Paul Byrd, who had been traded to the Boston Red Sox. He made nine starts with Cleveland to finish the season, going 2–3 with a 5.60 ERA. Jackson spent the majority of the 2009 season with the Triple-A Columbus Clippers, posting a 4–8 record with a 6.05 ERA in 30 games (14 starts). With Cleveland, he recorded a 9.35 ERA in three games (one start) without recording a decision.

=== Toronto Blue Jays ===
On January 9, 2010, Jackson was traded back to his first team, the Toronto Blue Jays, for a player to be named later. He spent the season with the Triple-A Las Vegas 51s, finishing 2–3 with a 5.64 ERA in 35 games (five starts).

=== Texas Rangers ===
Jackson signed a minor league contract with the Texas Rangers on January 6, 2011. He pitched two seasons for their Triple-A affiliate, the Round Rock Express.

=== Kansas City Royals ===
On February 11, 2013, Jackson signed a minor league contract with the Kansas City Royals. He was converted to a reliever in the Royals system, and was 2–1 with 18 saves and a 1.38 ERA in 33 relief appearances with the Double-A Northwest Arkansas Naturals. He also made two scoreless appearances with the Triple-A Omaha Storm Chasers.

=== Washington Nationals ===
Jackson signed a minor league contract with the Washington Nationals on January 17, 2014. He was released on July 27.

On July 20, 2015, Jackson announced his retirement from baseball.
