= Gabe Gross =

American baseball player and coach (born 1979)

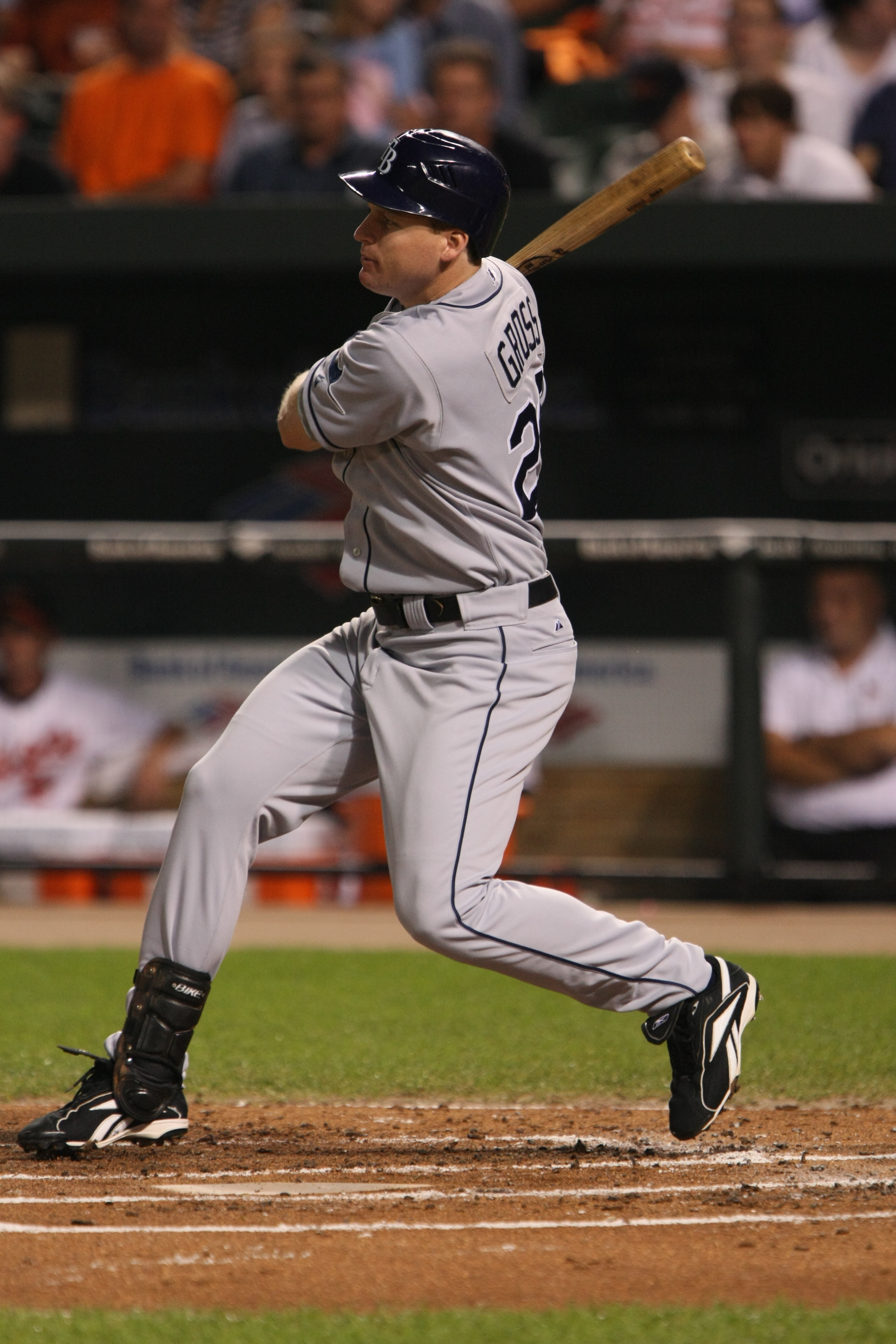
- Gross with the Tampa Bay Rays in 2008

Auburn Tigers
- Outfielder / Coach
- Born: October 21, 1979 (age 47); Baltimore, Maryland, U.S.
- Batted: Left Threw: Right

MLB debut
- August 7, 2004, for the Toronto Blue Jays

Last MLB appearance
- October 3, 2010, for the Oakland Athletics

MLB statistics
- Batting average: .239
- Home runs: 40
- Runs batted in: 186
- Stats at Baseball Reference

Teams
- Toronto Blue Jays (2004–2005); Milwaukee Brewers (2006–2008); Tampa Bay Rays (2008–2009); Oakland Athletics (2010)

Gabriel Jordan Gross (born October 21, 1979) is an American former professional baseball outfielder who is currently the hitting coach for the Auburn Tigers. He played in Major League Baseball (MLB) for the Toronto Blue Jays, Milwaukee Brewers, Tampa Bay Rays, and Oakland Athletics.

His father, Lee Gross, was center for the Auburn Tigers and in the NFL. His brother, Bo Gross, played football for Texas Christian University.

== Career ==
Gross played football, basketball, and baseball at Northview High School in Dothan, Alabama. Formerly a starting quarterback for the Auburn football team, and an outfielder for the Auburn baseball team, Gross was drafted by the Toronto Blue Jays in the first round (15th overall) of the 2001 Major League Baseball draft. Promoted from Triple-A Syracuse on August 7, 2004, he saw limited duty against left-handed pitching.

On September 5, 2004, he belted his first major league home run, a grand slam off Oakland Athletics pitcher Justin Duchscherer. His outfield range was very good, and he had a strong arm. In 38 games, he collected 73 putouts with five assists and one double play in 78 total chances, for a perfect 1.000 fielding percentage.

On December 7, 2005, Gross was traded by the Blue Jays to the Milwaukee Brewers, along with pitchers Dave Bush and Zach Jackson, in exchange for first baseman Lyle Overbay and pitching prospect Ty Taubenheim.

Gross made his debut with the Brewers on April 4, 2006, and hit a pinch-hit home run to give the Brewers a victory over the Pittsburgh Pirates.

At the beginning of the 2006 season with the Brewers, he obtained the nickname "the Southern Gentleman" for his politeness and well-mannered attitude both on and off the field.

The plan was to have him share time with Tony Gwynn Jr. and Gabe Kapler in center field in 2008 while Mike Cameron served his 25-game suspension. With a focus on defense, manager Ned Yost indicated in March that Gwynn and Kapler might have a leg up on Gross.

Gross was traded to the Tampa Bay Rays on April 22, 2008, for pitching prospect Josh Butler.

Gross finished the 2008 season batting .243, with 13 home runs and 38 RBI.

On December 12, 2009, Gross was non-tendered by the Rays. On February 1, 2010, Gross signed with Oakland Athletics to a one-year contract. Gross signed a minor league contract with an invitation to spring training with the Seattle Mariners on February 5, 2011. He was released on March 26. On April 23, he signed a minor league contract with the Florida (now Miami) Marlins.

Gross retired on April 26, 2011.
