= Runelvys Hernández =

Dominican baseball player

Runelvys Hernandez
- Pitcher
- Born: 27 April 1978 (age 48); Santo Domingo, Dominican Republic
- Batted: Right Threw: Right

Professional debut
- MLB: 15 July, 2002, for the Kansas City Royals
- KBO: 5 April, 2009, for the Samsung Lions

Last appearance
- MLB: 21 July, 2008, for the Houston Astros
- KBO: 2 July, 2009, for the Samsung Lions

MLB statistics
- Win–loss record: 25–36
- Earned run average: 5.50
- Strikeouts: 246

KBO statistics
- Win–loss record: 2–3
- Earned run average: 5.70
- Strikeouts: 24
- Stats at Baseball Reference

Teams
- Kansas City Royals (2002–2003, 2005–2006); Houston Astros (2008); Samsung Lions (2009)

Runelvys Antonio Hernandez (Spanish pronunciation: [ruˈnelβis eɾˈnandeθ]; born 27 April 1978) is a Dominican former right-handed Major League Baseball (MLB) starting pitcher.

== Career ==
Hernandez made his major league debut 15 July, 2002, with Kansas City Royals. His encouraging rookie campaign manifested itself in a 4–4 record with a 4.36 ERA in 74 1/3 innings of work over 12 starts.

Initially thought of as the right-handed ace of the 2003 Royals team that posted the franchise's first winning record in nine seasons, Hernandez became the opening-day pitcher by winning Royals' manager Tony Peña's coin toss against left-hander Jeremy Affeldt. After spending the first five weeks on the leaderboard in almost every pitching category, Hernandez faltered as he tried to pitch through pain, and his season ended after 16 starts. He finished the season with a 7–5 record, but missed the entire 2004 season with Tommy John surgery.

On 17 July, 2005, Hernandez ignited a bench-clearing brawl by hitting Detroit Tigers shortstop Carlos Guillén in the head to lead off the sixth inning. The two continued to exchange words down the first base line, and Hernandez threw down his glove and went after Guillén. In all, seven players were ejected, most notably Kyle Farnsworth, who tackled Jeremy Affeldt to reignite the situation that had been settling down. Later in his Royals career, Hernandez got into a scuffle with batterymate John Buck.

On 26 August, 2006, Hernandez pitched his first complete game shutout against the Toronto Blue Jays. The win was made even more special because he defeated Roy Halladay, one of the best pitchers in the game at the time.

Hernandez was released by the Royals on 7 December 2006, and signed to a minor-league contract by the Boston Red Sox on 22 December 2006. The contract he signed with the Red Sox included an opt-out clause that would become effective if he was not on the Major League roster by 1 June. On that date, he exercised that option and was released. On 5 June, he signed a minor league contract with the New York Yankees. He was released a month later on 6 July. On 17 July, he signed a minor league contract with the Pittsburgh Pirates, but would be released less than a month later.

On 17 January, 2008, Hernandez signed a minor league contract with the Houston Astros. In September of that year, Hernandez, 25–36 for career in majors, received a 50-day suspension for testing positive for an amphetamine-based substance. However, the Office of the Commissioner of Major League Baseball announced on Friday, 17 October 2008 that it had withdrawn the suspension of the former Astros' starting pitcher because it was a first offense. The Commissioner’s Office also issued a brief statement to clarify that Hernandez's 12 June 2008 positive test for an amphetamine based substance under the Minor League Drug Prevention Program "shall not constitute a violation," and that Hernandez would not be subject to disciplinary action.

On 22 December, 2008, Hernandez signed with the Samsung Lions in South Korea's Korea Baseball Organization, but he sought and was issued his release on 9 July 2009.
