= Lyle Overbay =

American baseball player (born 1977)

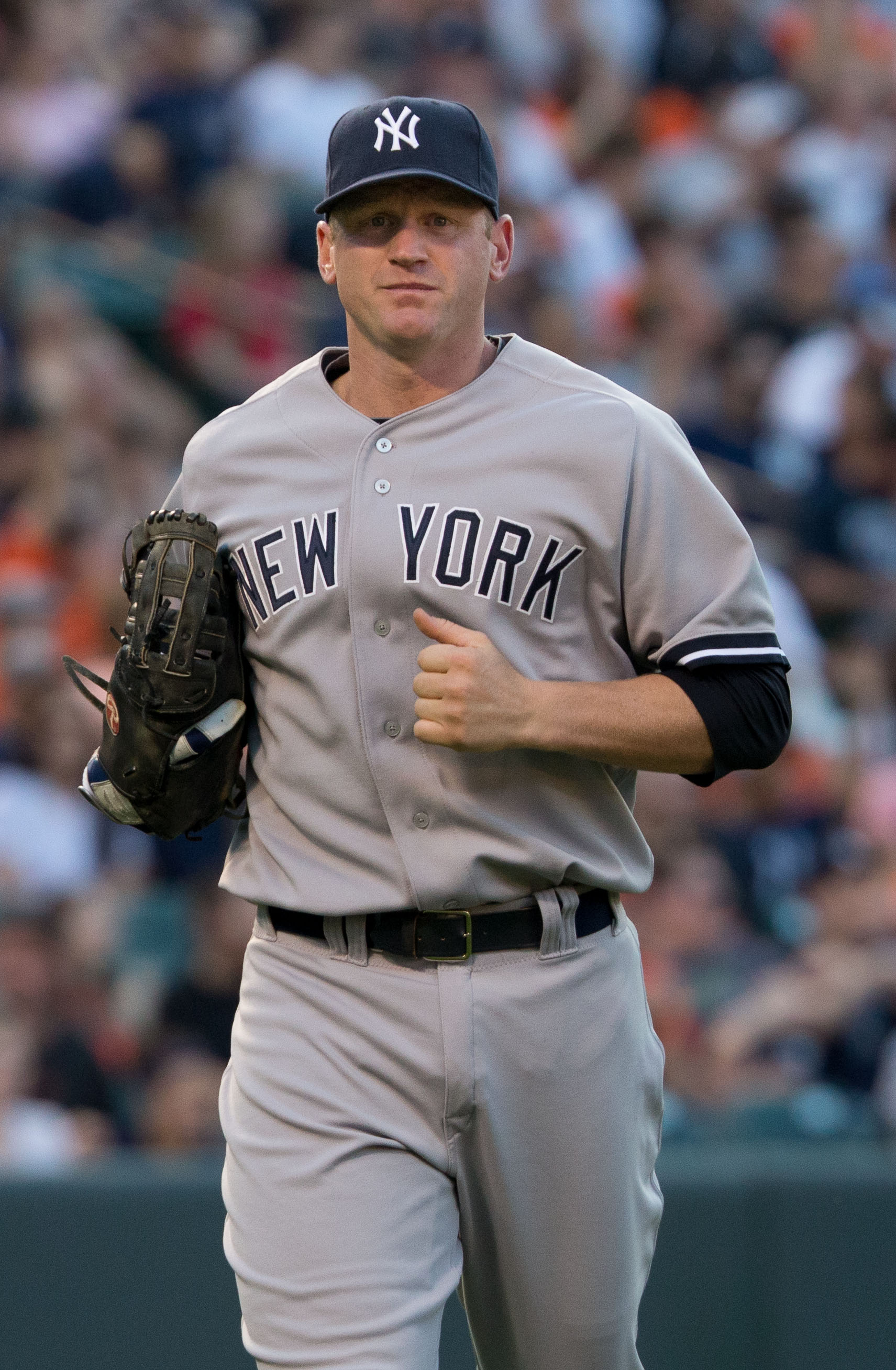
- Overbay with the New York Yankees
- First baseman
- Born: January 28, 1977 (age 49); Centralia, Washington, U.S.
- Batted: Left Threw: Left

MLB debut
- September 19, 2001, for the Arizona Diamondbacks

Last MLB appearance
- September 28, 2014, for the Milwaukee Brewers

MLB statistics
- Batting average: .266
- Home runs: 151
- Runs batted in: 675
- Stats at Baseball Reference

Teams
- Arizona Diamondbacks (2001–2003); Milwaukee Brewers (2004–2005); Toronto Blue Jays (2006–2010); Pittsburgh Pirates (2011); Arizona Diamondbacks (2011–2012); Atlanta Braves (2012); New York Yankees (2013); Milwaukee Brewers (2014)

Lyle Stefan Overbay (born January 28, 1977) is an American former professional baseball first baseman. He played in Major League Baseball (MLB) for the Arizona Diamondbacks, Toronto Blue Jays, Pittsburgh Pirates, Atlanta Braves, New York Yankees, and Milwaukee Brewers from 2001 through 2014.

== College career ==
Overbay attended the University of Nevada, Reno, where he played college baseball for the Nevada Wolf Pack baseball team.

== Professional career ==
=== Draft and minors ===
Overbay was selected by the Arizona Diamondbacks in the 18th round of the 1999 MLB draft. While playing in the farm system, he was named Diamondbacks minor league player of the year in 2001.

=== Arizona Diamondbacks ===
Overbay made his Major League debut on September 19, 2001. Overbay appeared in two games, getting one hit out of two plate appearances during his brief stint in the majors in 2001.

During the 2002 season, Overbay played mostly in the minors and only played in 10 games in the majors.

Overbay first played with the Diamondbacks as the full-time first baseman in 2003. He played in 86 games, batting .276 with four home runs and 28 RBI. He was sent down to Triple-A Tucson in June, but was called up in September to be part of the 40-man roster expansion. He was traded to the Milwaukee Brewers during the off-season.

=== Milwaukee Brewers ===
Overbay was acquired by the Milwaukee Brewers on December 1, 2003, in a trade that sent Richie Sexson and Shane Nance to Arizona for Overbay, Craig Counsell, Junior Spivey, Chris Capuano, Chad Moeller, and Jorge de la Rosa. During the 2004 season, Overbay batted .301 with 16 home runs, 87 RBI, and a major league-leading 53 doubles.

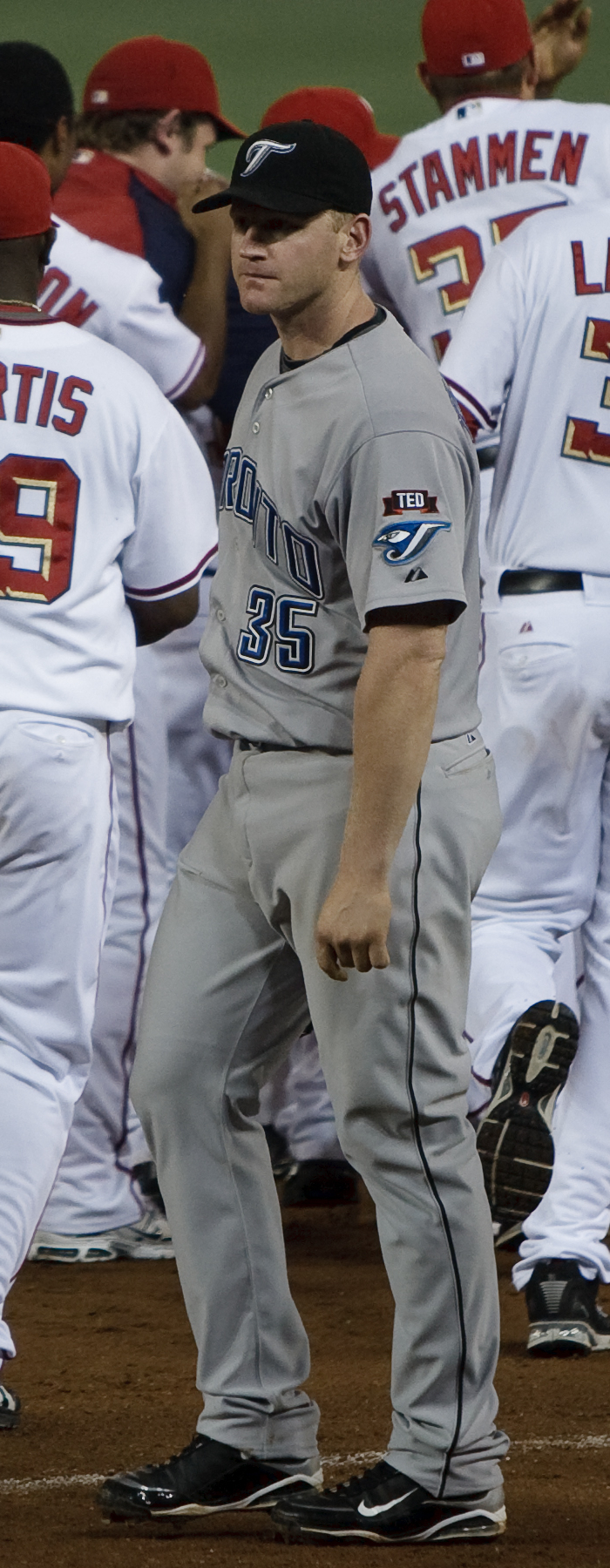
Overbay with the Toronto Blue Jays in 2009

In 2005, Overbay hit 19 home runs, surpassing his 2004 total of 16. On July 23, he had a career high 6 RBI against the Cincinnati Reds, hitting two home runs, including a grand slam. This feat was also the most in a season by a Brewer. He played very well against the Reds, batting .431 with six home runs and 18 RBI. He was traded to the Blue Jays in the off-season. He was a fan favorite in Milwaukee. When Overbay stepped up to plate, fans would do the "O chant." Fans would raise their hands over their heads in an "O" symbol – some brought cardboard cut outs of the letter "O" – and would chant a prolonged "O" sound to honor Overbay. Overbay said of the chant, "The "O" chant doesn't break my concentration. Sometimes it gets me too pumped up because I want to come through and give the fans something to cheer about, instead of just chanting. But overall, I think it's cool that I get that treatment from Brewers fans."

=== Toronto Blue Jays ===
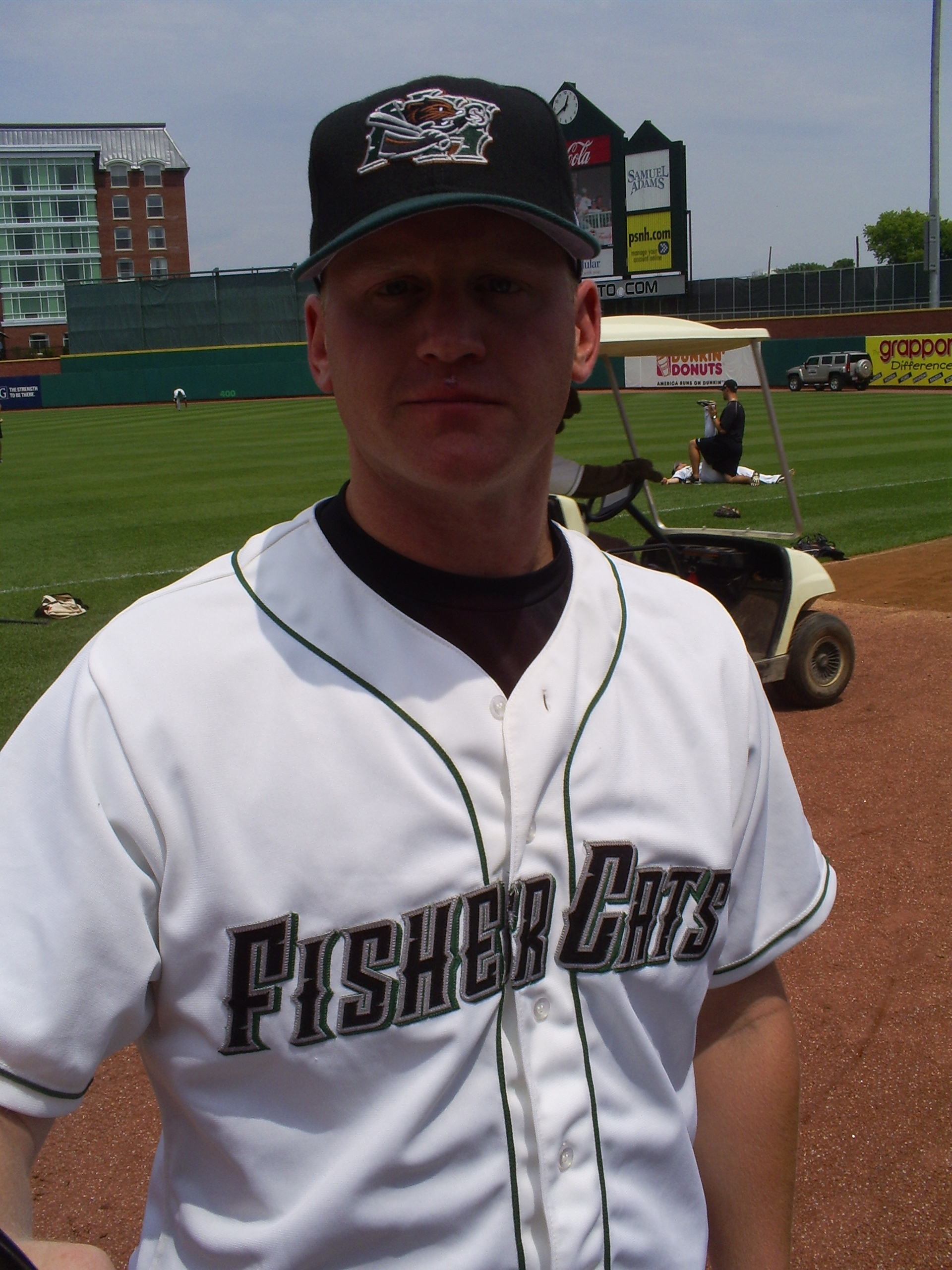
Overbay with the New Hampshire Fisher Cats

On December 7, 2005, Overbay was traded from the Brewers along with pitching prospect Ty Taubenheim to the Toronto Blue Jays in exchange for outfielder Gabe Gross and pitchers Dave Bush and Zach Jackson. Although the trade was acknowledged as a needed acquisition for the Blue Jays, Overbay did not have the statistical impact hoped for, at least beyond 2006. From 2007 to 2008, Overbay statistically trailed Bush in the sabermetric categories wins above replacement player and value over replacement player.

On July 5, 2006, Overbay was named American League Player of the Week after hitting .423 and hitting four home runs during the week of June 26 to July 2, 2006. In 2006, he had a career season, batting .312 with 22 home runs, 92 RBI and 181 hits, which were all career-highs. He also had 46 doubles, which was tenth among the major leagues.

On January 15, 2007, the Toronto Blue Jays signed Overbay to a four-year contract, buying out his final two arbitration-eligible years, and his first two years of free agency, with a $24 million contract. On June 4, 2007, Overbay was hit by a pitch in the sixth inning of a game against the Chicago White Sox. The pitch was a high and inside fastball that ran in and hit him in the hand, resulting in a fracture that was estimated to sideline him for four to six weeks. He was on the disabled list until July 12, 2007, rejoining the Blue Jays after the All-Star break. After his return, he struggled at the plate, especially with hitting for power.

Overbay set a new team record on May 25, 2008, by reaching base in his 12th consecutive plate appearance after walking on a full count in the second inning. The previous record holder was Tony Fernández who reached base 11 straight times. That season, he was criticized by fans for his penchant to ground into double plays. He finished 2008 tied for seventh overall in this category, with 24. Overbay is also one of only 15 players to hit into an unassisted triple play, serving up Asdrúbal Cabrera of the Cleveland Indians on May 12, 2008.

On June 8, 2009, Overbay was again named American League Player of the Week after leading the Major League in both batting average and slugging. He was also named the 2009 American Legion Graduate of the Year.

=== Pittsburgh Pirates ===
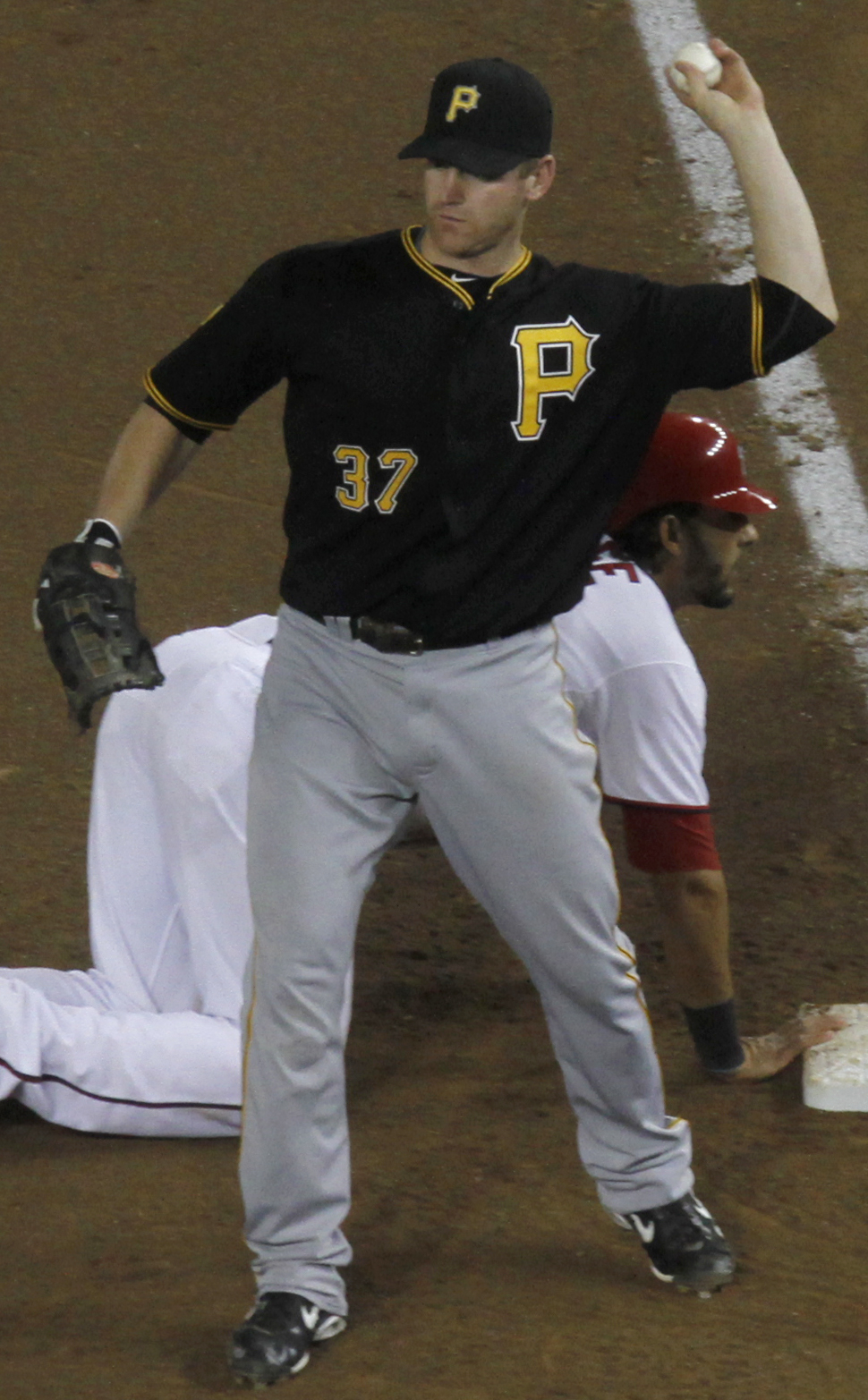
Overbay playing for the Pittsburgh Pirates in 2011

On December 14, 2010, Overbay signed a one-year, $5 million contract with the Pittsburgh Pirates. After batting .227 with eight home runs and 37 RBIs in 103 games, he was designated for assignment on August 1, 2011, and released on August 5.

=== Second stint with the Arizona Diamondbacks ===
On August 13, Overbay re-signed with the Arizona Diamondbacks, replacing the injured Xavier Nady. The Diamondbacks paired Overbay with Paul Goldschmidt, who Overbay mentored.

On December 8, 2011, Overbay signed a one-year deal with the Diamondbacks. He was used mostly as a pinch hitter. On July 30, Arizona designated Overbay for assignment. They then released him on August 6.

=== Atlanta Braves ===
On August 20, 2012, the Atlanta Braves signed Overbay to a minor league contract. He was called up when the rosters expanded on September 1, 2012.

=== Boston Red Sox, New York Yankees ===
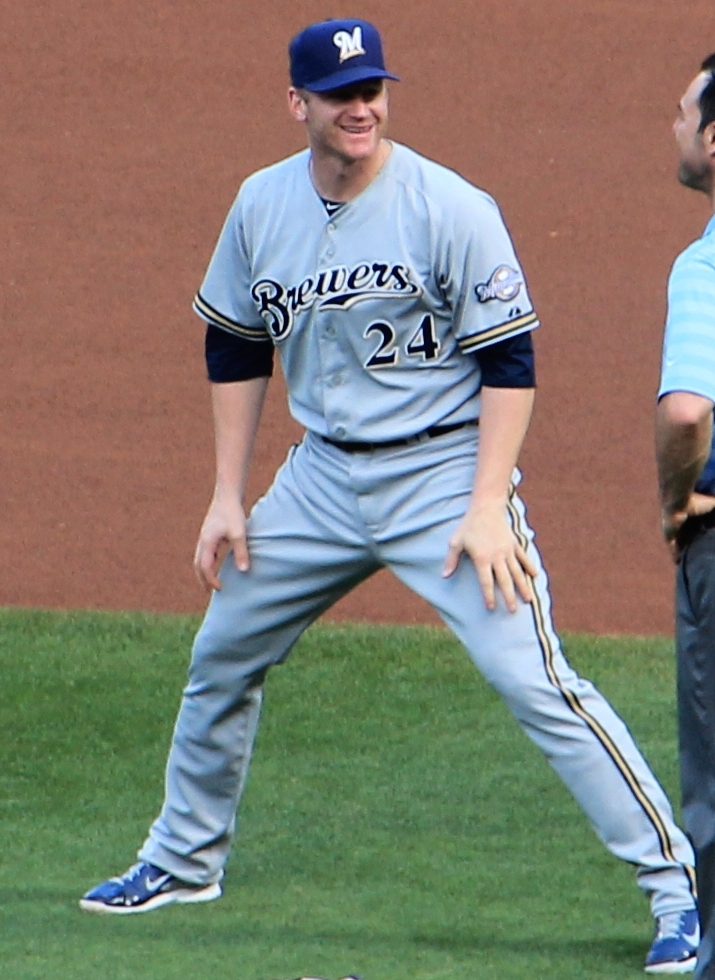
Overbay with the Brewers in 2014

On January 13, 2013, the Boston Red Sox announced that Overbay had been signed to a minor league contract with an invitation to major league spring training. He was released by the Red Sox on March 26, 2013, and signed by the New York Yankees to a minor league deal later that day. On March 31, the Yankees added Overbay to their 25-man active roster.

On May 10, 2013, Overbay went 4-for-5 with two doubles, a two-run home run, 5 RBI, and two runs scored in an 11–6 win over the Kansas City Royals at Kauffman Stadium. On June 3, he made his first career start in right field. On June 26, the Yankees announced that Mark Teixeira was going to undergo season-ending wrist surgery, allowing Overbay to be the everyday first baseman for the remainder of the season. After the team signed Mark Reynolds on August 15, who had been released by the Cleveland Indians several days prior, Overbay and Reynolds platooned at first base for the remainder of the season, with the left-handed hitting Overbay usually starting against right-handed pitchers.

=== Second stint with the Milwaukee Brewers ===
On January 20, 2014, Overbay agreed to a minor league contract with the Milwaukee Brewers that contained an invite to spring training.

Overbay made the Brewers regular season roster, announced March 23, and will play first base for the Brewers alongside Mark Reynolds, the team's other first baseman. Coincidentally, these same two players played for the Yankees at the same time in the previous season. Manager Ron Roenicke cited Overbay's good defense skills at first base and his veteran status in making his decision. On May 19, 2014, Overbay made his first career pitching appearance against his old team, the Atlanta Braves. With two outs in the bottom of the eighth inning of a 9–3 game, he was called upon to get the final out. He faced only one batter (Ryan Doumit), getting the needed out on a popup to the shortstop Jean Segura. Overbay finished the 2014 season batting .233 in 121 games, with four home runs and 35 RBI. On October 1, he told MLB Radio Network that he was "99.9 percent sure" he would retire.

=== Career statistics ===
In 1587 games over 14 seasons, Overbay posted a .266 batting average (1,355-for-5,102) with 645 runs, 356 doubles, 12 triples, 151 home runs, 675 RBI, 638 bases on balls, .347 on-base percentage and .429 slugging percentage. He finished his career with a .995 fielding percentage as a first baseman and also played several games at right field.

== Personal life ==
Overbay and his wife Sarah have six children. Overbay is a Christian. He is the coach for Tumwater's High Schools, Tumwater Thunderbirds. Overbay lead them to two state championships, 2021-

== See also ==
- List of Major League Baseball annual doubles leaders
