= Dave Bush =

American baseball player & coach (born 1979)

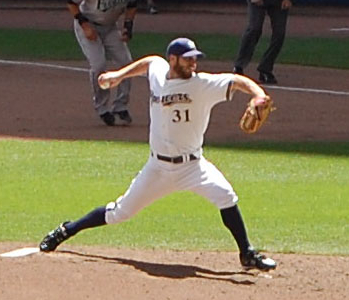
- Bush with the Milwaukee Brewers in 2009

Texas Rangers – No. 89
- Pitcher / Coach
- Born: November 9, 1979 (age 46); Pittsburgh, Pennsylvania, U.S.
- Batted: Right Threw: Right

Professional debut
- MLB: July 2, 2004, for the Toronto Blue Jays
- KBO: June 6, 2012, for the SK Wyverns

Last appearance
- KBO: October 4, 2012, for the SK Wyverns
- MLB: April 7, 2013, for the Toronto Blue Jays

MLB statistics
- Win–loss record: 56–69
- Earned run average: 4.73
- Strikeouts: 768

KBO statistics
- Win–loss record: 4–6
- Earned run average: 4.43
- Strikeouts: 45
- Stats at Baseball Reference

Teams
- Toronto Blue Jays (2004–2005); Milwaukee Brewers (2006–2010); Texas Rangers (2011); SK Wyverns (2012); Toronto Blue Jays (2013); As coach: Boston Red Sox (2020–2023); Texas Rangers (2025–present)

David Thomas Bush (born November 9, 1979) is an American professional baseball coach and former pitcher who is the current assistant pitching coach for the Texas Rangers. He played in Major League Baseball (MLB) for the Toronto Blue Jays, Milwaukee Brewers, and Texas Rangers, as well as in the KBO League for the SK Wyverns.

From 2020 to 2023, Bush was the pitching coach for the Boston Red Sox.

== Early life ==
Bush graduated from Conestoga High School in Berwyn, Pennsylvania and played college baseball at Wake Forest University where he was a double major in psychology and sociology. In 2000 and 2001, he played collegiate summer baseball for the Chatham A's of the Cape Cod Baseball League (CCBL), where he posted a league-leading 11 saves in 2000 with an earned run average of 0.84, and returned in 2001 to post an ERA of 0.34. In 2011, Bush was inducted into the CCBL Hall of Fame.

== Playing career ==
=== Milwaukee Brewers ===
On August 11, 2010, in a game against the Arizona Diamondbacks, Bush became the third player in Major League history to allow four straight home runs (Paul Foytack and Chase Wright were the others). Bush was touched for consecutive solo blasts by Adam LaRoche, Miguel Montero, Mark Reynolds and Stephen Drew.

=== Texas Rangers ===
On January 30, 2011, Bush signed a minor league contract with the Texas Rangers as their long reliever. He was designated for assignment on July 1, 2011. He was released on July 6.

=== Chicago Cubs ===
Bush signed a minor league contract with the Chicago Cubs on July 15. He opted out of his contract on August 11, after appearing in five games for the Triple-A Iowa Cubs, recording a 6.14 ERA.

=== Philadelphia Phillies ===
On August 14, 2011, Bush signed a minor league contract with the Philadelphia Phillies. On June 5, 2012, Bush opted out of that contract to pitch for the SK Wyverns of the KBO.

=== Toronto Blue Jays ===
Bush started the 2013 season with the Triple-A Buffalo Bisons, but the Blue Jays brought him up on April 6 when Jeremy Jeffress was designated for assignment. Bush was designated for assignment on April 8, 2013. Bush cleared waivers and was assigned to Triple-A Buffalo.

=== Near no-hitters ===
On three instances in Bush's career, he flirted with a no-hitter, taking it beyond seven complete innings. The first was on July 20, 2004, while pitching with the Blue Jays in only his third major-league starting appearance. He pitched 7 1/3 innings against the Oakland A's until Damian Miller, his future teammate with the Brewers, singled against him. In Milwaukee, Bush's next opportunity came against his former team, Toronto, on June 19, 2008. Lyle Overbay, the man Bush was traded for, led off the eighth inning with a triple to end the bid. In an April 23, 2009 game against the Philadelphia Phillies, he once again took the no-hit bid 7 1/3 innings before giving up a home run to Matt Stairs.

== Post-playing career ==
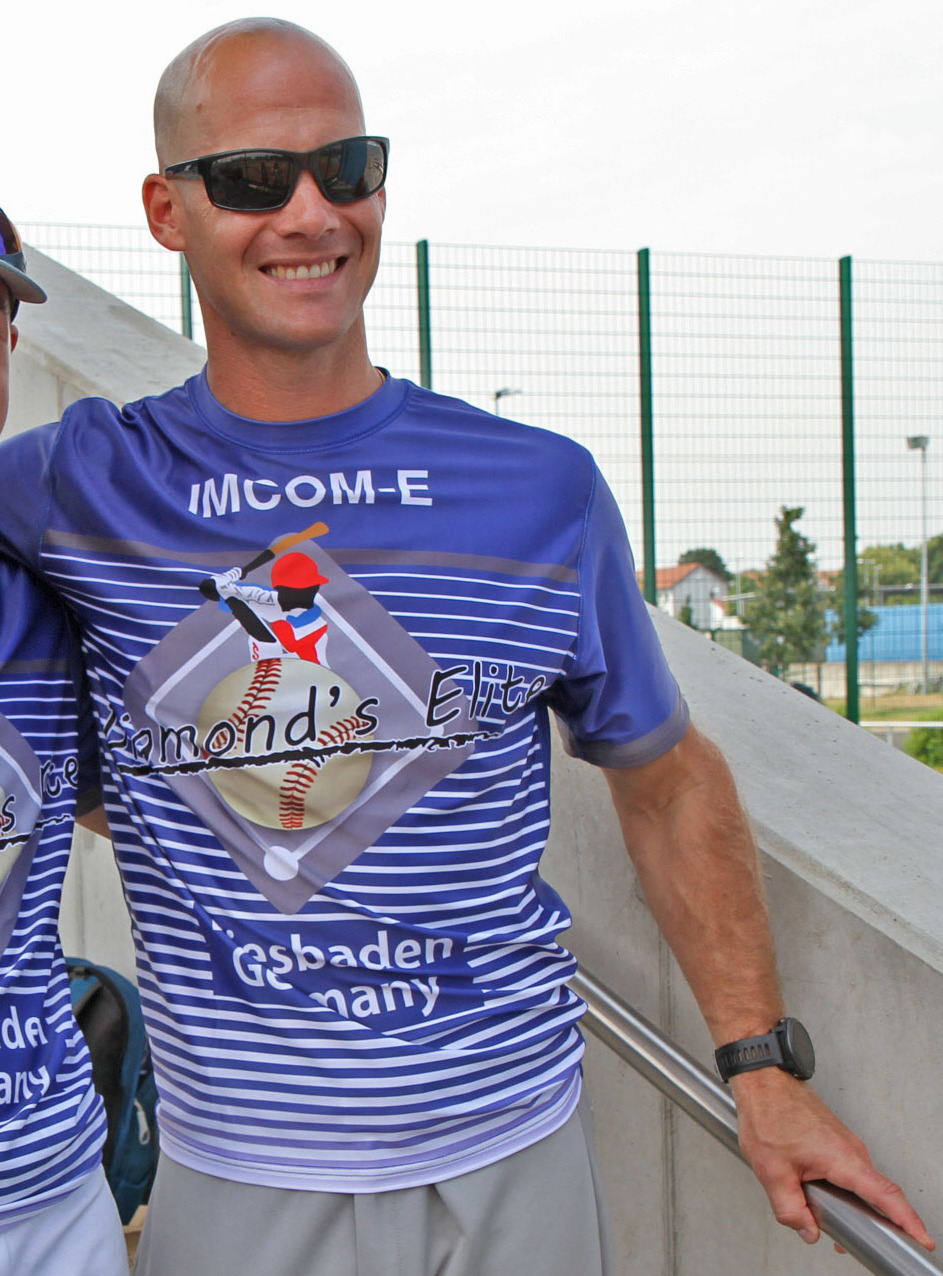
Bush at a baseball clinic at Lucius D. Clay Kaserne in 2016

Bush began working in private business in Bridgton, Maine, in 2011, but he remained in baseball as a coach at Bridgton Academy. He joined MLB International as an envoy-coach in March 2015, serving for two years as a pitching coach with national teams from China and South Africa, then joined the Red Sox late in 2016 as a pitching development analyst. On January 10, 2019, Bush was named minor league pitching coordinator (performance) for the Boston Red Sox of Major League Baseball.

On October 31, 2019, Bush was named the pitching coach for the Boston Red Sox. He was fired by the Red Sox on October 9, 2023.

After being let go as by Boston in 2023, Bush was hired in January 2024 as the director of pitching strategy for the Texas Rangers.

Sporting positions
Preceded by Dana LeVangie	Boston Red Sox pitching coach 2020–2023	Succeeded by Andrew Bailey
