= 2007 Detroit Tigers season =

Major League Baseball season

2007 Detroit Tigers
- League: American League
- Division: Central
- Ballpark: Comerica Park
- City: Detroit
- Record: 88–74 (.543)
- Divisional place: 2nd
- Owners: Mike Ilitch
- General managers: Dave Dombrowski
- Managers: Jim Leyland
- Television: FSN Detroit; WJBK (Mario Impemba, Rod Allen)
- Radio: The Detroit Tigers Radio Network (Dan Dickerson, Jim Price)

The 2007 Detroit Tigers season was the team's 107th season and its eighth at Comerica Park. The season ended with the 88–74 Tigers finishing runner-up in the American League Central, eight games in back of the Cleveland Indians. They failed in winning the Wild Card.

After a trip to the 2006 World Series that ended with a defeat to the St. Louis Cardinals, the Tigers started the offseason by trading pitchers Humberto Sánchez, Kevin Whelan, and Anthony Claggett to the New York Yankees for outfielder and designated hitter Gary Sheffield. Plus, they re-signed players from the previous season's team; first baseman Sean Casey, second baseman Omar Infante, outfielder Craig Monroe, left-handed starting pitcher Nate Robertson, and right-handed relief pitcher Fernando Rodney all returned with the Tigers for the 2007 season.

== Regular season ==
As of July 18, the Tigers had sold 2,712,393 tickets at Comerica Park for the 2007 season, setting a new single-season home attendance record for the team. The previous record had been 2,704,794 customers at Tiger Stadium in 1984. At the end of the season, the Tigers had sold over 3,000,000 tickets for 2007.

=== Season standings ===
AL Central
Team	W	L	Pct.	GB	Home	Road
Cleveland Indians	96	66	.593	—	51‍–‍29	45‍–‍37
Detroit Tigers	88	74	.543	8	45‍–‍36	43‍–‍38
Minnesota Twins	79	83	.488	17	41‍–‍40	38‍–‍43
Chicago White Sox	72	90	.444	24	38‍–‍43	34‍–‍47
Kansas City Royals	69	93	.426	27	35‍–‍46	34‍–‍47

=== Record vs. opponents ===
2007 American League record Source: MLB Standings Grid – 2007
Team	BAL	BOS	CWS	CLE	DET	KC	LAA	MIN	NYY	OAK	SEA	TB	TEX	TOR	NL
Baltimore	—	6–12	5–3	3–4	1–5	7–0	3–7	0–7	9–9	4–4	2–7	11–7	4–6	8–10	6–12
Boston	12–6	—	7–1	5–2	3–4	3–3	6–4	4–3	8–10	4–4	4–5	13–5	6–4	9–9	12–6
Chicago	3–5	1–7	—	7–11	11–7	12–6	5–4	9–9	4–6	4–5	1–7	6–1	2–4	3–4	4–14
Cleveland	4–3	2–5	11–7	—	12–6	11–7	5–5	14–4	0–6	6–4	4–3	8–2	6–3	4–2	9–9
Detroit	5–1	4–3	7–11	6–12	—	11–7	3–5	12–6	4–4	4–6	6–4	3–4	5–4	4–3	14–4
Kansas City	0–7	3–3	6–12	7–11	7–11	—	5–2	9–9	1–9	6–4	3–6	4–3	5–4	3–4	10–8
Los Angeles	7–3	4–6	4–5	5–5	5–3	2–5	—	6–3	6–3	9–10	13–6	6–2	10–9	3–4	14–4
Minnesota	7–0	3–4	9–9	4–14	6–12	9–9	3–6	—	2–5	5–2	6–3	3–4	7–2	4–6	11–7
New York	9–9	10–8	6–4	6–0	4–4	9–1	3–6	5–2	—	2–4	5–5	10–8	5–1	10–8	10–8
Oakland	4–4	4–4	5–4	4–6	6–4	4–6	10–9	2–5	4–2	—	5–14	4–6	9–10	5–4	10–8
Seattle	7–2	5–4	7–1	3–4	4–6	6–3	6–13	3–6	5–5	14–5	—	4–3	11–8	4–5	9–9
Tampa Bay	7–11	5–13	1–6	2–8	4–3	3–4	2–6	4–3	8–10	6–4	3–4	—	5–4	9–9	7–11
Texas	6–4	4–6	4–2	3–6	4–5	4–5	9–10	2–7	1–5	10–9	8–11	4–5	—	5–5	11–7
Toronto	10–8	9–9	4–3	2–4	3–4	4–3	4–3	6–4	8–10	4–5	5–4	9–9	5–5	—	10–8

=== Roster ===
2007 Detroit Tigers
Roster
Pitchers: 40 Yorman Bazardo; 38 Jeremy Bonderman; 34 Tim Byrdak; 41 José Capellán; 36 Eulogio de la Cruz; 52 Chad Durbin; 49 Jason Grilli; 59 Todd Jones; 46 Jair Jurrjens; 41 Wilfredo Ledezma; 45 Aquilino López; 46 Mike Maroth; 43 Macay McBride; 94 José Mesa; 48 Andrew Miller; 31 Zach Miner; 50 Clay Rapada; 29 Nate Robertson; 56 Fernando Rodney; 37 Kenny Rogers; 44 Bobby Seay; 53 Jordan Tata; 32 Virgil Vasquez; 35 Justin Verlander; 54 Joel Zumaya	Catchers: 58 Mike Rabelo; 7,42 Iván Rodríguez; Infielders: 21 Sean Casey; 9 Carlos Guillén; 24 Mike Hessman; 20 Omar Infante; 15 Brandon Inge; 8 Neifi Pérez; 14 Plácido Polanco; 39 Ramón Santiago	Outfielders: 27 Brent Clevlen; 28,42 Curtis Granderson; 4 Cameron Maybin; 27,42 Craig Monroe; 30 Magglio Ordóñez; 19 Timo Pérez; 25 Ryan Raburn; 3,42 Gary Sheffield; 33,42 Marcus Thames	Manager: 10 Jim Leyland; Coaches: 17 Rafael Belliard (infield); 55 Chuck Hernandez (pitching); 51 Jeff Jones (bullpen); 22 Gene Lamont (third base); 12 Lloyd McClendon (hitting); 18 Andy Van Slyke (first base)

=== Season highlights ===
- On June 12, Pitcher Justin Verlander threw a no-hitter against the Milwaukee Brewers, winning the game 4–0. This was the first no-hitter by a Tiger since Jack Morris did it in 1984 and the first ever thrown at Comerica Park.
- Five players, second only to Boston's six, represented Detroit in the 2007 MLB All-Star Game. Carlos Guillén, Magglio Ordóñez, Plácido Polanco, Iván Rodríguez and Justin Verlander joined American League manager Jim Leyland in the All-Star game.
- On July 6, Neifi Pérez was suspended 25 games by MLB for a second positive test for a banned stimulant. He subsequently tested positive for a third time and was suspended on August 3 for 80 games.
- On August 17, highly touted prospect Cameron Maybin made his major league debut in New York City against the Yankees playing left-field.

=== Curtis Granderson ===
- On August 7, 2007, Granderson became only the second player in franchise history to have at least 30 doubles, 15 triples, 15 home runs, and 10 stolen bases in a single season when he hit a double in a game against the Tampa Bay Devil Rays. The other Tiger to accomplish this feat was Charlie Gehringer in 1930. Granderson hit his second inside-the-park home run in his first at bat against the Yankees on August 26, 2007.
- On September 7, 2007, Granderson became the 6th member all-time of baseball's exclusive 20–20–20 club. Granderson joined the 20–20–20 club with Kansas City's George Brett (1979), Willie Mays of the New York Giants (1957), Cleveland's Jeff Heath (1941), St. Louis' Jim Bottomley (1928), and Frank Schulte of the Chicago Cubs (1911).
- On September 9, 2007, Granderson stole his 20th base of the season and joined Willie Mays and Frank "Wildfire" Schulte as the only players in major league history to reach 20 doubles, 20 triples, 20 home runs, and 20 stolen bases in a season. Schulte was the first to accomplish the feat in 1911 while playing for the Chicago Cubs and Mays did it in 1957 with the New York Giants. Jimmy Rollins of the Philadelphia Phillies would later that year accomplish the same feat.

=== Magglio Ordóñez ===
Magglio Ordóñez had one of the best season by a Detroit Tiger batter in the past 60 years. Magglio's records and accomplishments in 2007 include:

- His .363 batting average was the highest in Major League Baseball. He finished the season as the AL batting champion, and is the first Tiger player to accomplish the feat since Norm Cash in 1961. The last Tiger to hit for a higher average was Charlie Gehringer in 1937.
- His 54 doubles was the most in Major League Baseball. It is the most by a Tiger since George Kell hit 56 in 1950.
- His 139 RBIs was the highest by a Tiger since Rocky Colavito had 140 in 1961. Colavito is the only Tiger batter with more RBIs than Ordóñez in the past 60 years.
- On August 12, 2007, Magglio hit two home runs in an eight-run second-inning of an 11–6 win over the Oakland Athletics, becoming the second batter in Tigers' history to achieve this feat; Al Kaline had done so on April 17, 1955, in a 16–0 win over the then-Kansas City Athletics.
- Ordóñez had an on-base percentage of .434. Only two other Tiger batters in the past 60 years have hit for a higher on-base percentage: Tony Phillips in 1993 (.443) and Norm Cash in 1961 (.487).
- Only one Tiger in the past 60 years has had a higher slugging percentage than Magglio's .595: Norm Cash in 1961 had a slugging percentage of .662.

The one Tiger hitting season in the past 60 years that exceeds Ordonez's 2007 season is that of Norm Cash in 1961. In 1961, the AL MVP award was given to New York Yankee slugger Roger Maris who hit 61 home runs.

== 2007–08 offseason events ==
On October 9, 2007, the Tigers announced that they were picking up the $13 million, fifth-year option on Iván Rodríguez's contract, keeping him on the roster through at least the 2008 season. The Tigers could have bought out the option for $3 million and allowed him to become a free agent.

On October 10, the Tigers returned Rule 5 draftee Edward Campusano to the Chicago Cubs. Campusano spent the entire 2007 season on the 60-day disabled list.

Relief pitcher Joel Zumaya was injured while at his off-season home in California. While moving boxes during the October 2007 California wildfires, a large box fell on Zumaya, separating his shoulder. Zumaya had surgery to correct the problem and is currently rehabilitating the shoulder.

On October 29, first baseman Sean Casey filed for free agency, on the first day players could do so. The team's management had already informed Casey that he would not return to the lineup the following season. The same day, the Tigers acquired shortstop Édgar Rentería from the Atlanta Braves, in exchange for pitching prospect Jair Jurrjens and outfielding prospect Gorkys Hernández. The move paves the way for current shortstop Carlos Guillén to move to the vacant spot at first base.

On October 30, utility infielder Neifi Pérez filed for free agency. He had not played since July 5 after being suspended for violating the league's performance-enhancing drug policy.

On November 12, veteran closer Todd Jones was re-signed to a one-year, $7 million contract. The same day, the Tigers received outfielder Jacque Jones in a trade with the Chicago Cubs for utility man Omar Infante.

On November 30, Kenny Rogers agreed to a one-year, 8-million contract to return to the Tigers. Rogers represented himself in contract negotiations after firing agent Scott Boras on November 17. The contract contains performance bonuses based on how many innings Rogers pitches in 2008. The team also signed free-agent pitcher Francisco Cruceta to a one-year deal.

On December 5, the Tigers pulled off a blockbuster trade with the Florida Marlins, with starting pitcher Dontrelle Willis and third-baseman Miguel Cabrera arriving from Florida. The Tigers send in exchange backup catcher Mike Rabelo, top outfielding prospect Cameron Maybin, top pitching prospect Andrew Miller, and three other minor leaguers. The same day, the Tigers swapped pitchers with the Colorado Rockies, acquiring Denny Bautista for prospect José Capellán. Also, the Tigers sent minor-league slugger Chris Shelton to Texas for outfielder Freddy Guzman.

The Cabrera trade would make current third-baseman Brandon Inge expendable. Inge asked management for a trade, but the team was unable to make a deal. Inge's four-year, $24 million contract, signed before the 2007 season, was partly to blame. Inge would eventually drop the matter and accept the role as a utilityman.

On December 6, the Tigers selected minor-league pitchers Juan Cedeño from the Washington organization and Ben Fritz from the Oakland organization in the Rule 5 draft. The Tigers lost minor-league pitchers Randor Bierd, Corey Hamman and Jose Fragoso.

On December 29, the Tigers and Dontrelle Willis signed a three-year, $29 million contract extension.

On January 16, 2008, the Tigers avoided arbitration with Nate Robertson and signed him to a three-year, $21.25 million contract. He would have been a free agent after the 2009 season. The following day, the Tigers avoided arbitration with outfielder Marcus Thames, signing him to a one-year, $1,275,000 contract. On the 18th, the team was able to avoid arbitration with all of their eligible players by signing Miguel Cabrera to a one-year, $11.3 million contract. Reliever Bobby Seay was given a one-year, $780,000 contract.

On February 4, center fielder Curtis Granderson signed a 5-year, $30.25 million contract extension, keeping the speedy lead-off man on the roster through at least 2012. There is a team option for 2013.

On February 5, the Tigers completed another trade with the Texas Rangers, sending Class A Lakeland and Class AA Erie outfielder Michael Hernandez in exchange for minor league right-hander Armando Galarraga.

On March 25, the Tigers finalized a long-term contract for Miguel Cabrera. Cabrera signed an eight-year, $152.3 million deal, which is the biggest in Detroit Tigers history.

== Game log ==
2007 game log
April

#	Date	Opponent	Score	Win	Loss	Save	Attendance	Record
1	April 2	Blue Jays	5 – 3 (10)	Frasor (1–0)	Rodney (0–1)	Ryan (1)	44,297	0–1
2	April 4	Blue Jays	10 – 9	Robertson (1–0)	Burnett (0–1)	Jones (1)	24,881	1-1
--	April 5	Blue Jays	Postponed (cold weather) Rescheduled for September 10					1-1
3	April 6	@ Royals	3 – 1	de la Rosa (1–0)	Mesa (0–1)	Riske (1)	13,330	1–2
4	April 7	@ Royals	6 – 5	Maroth (1–0)	Meche (1-1)	Jones (2)	13,899	2-2
5	April 8	@ Royals	3 – 2	Rodney (1-1)	Riske (0–1)	Jones (3)	13,109	3–2
6	April 9	@ Orioles	6 – 2	Cabrera (1-1)	Durbin (0–1)		48,159	3-3
7	April 10	@ Orioles	3 – 1	Robertson (2–0)	Wright (0–2)	Jones (4)	18,594	4–3
8	April 11	@ Orioles	4 – 1 (12)	Ledezma (1–0)	Birkins (0–1)	Jones (5)	13,288	5–3
9	April 12	@ Blue Jays	5 – 4	Maroth (2–0)	Ohka (0–1)	Zumaya (1)	20,416	6–3
10	April 13	@ Blue Jays	2 – 1 (10)	Halladay (2–0)	Rodney (1–2)		26,268	6–4
11	April 14	@ Blue Jays	10 – 7	Ledezma (2–0)	Ryan (0–2)	Jones (6)	28,203	7–4
12	April 15	@ Blue Jays	2 – 1	Towers (1-1)	Robertson (2–1)	Marcum (1)	25,983	7–5
13	April 16	Royals	12 – 5	Verlander (1–0)	Greinke (1–2)		21,832	8–5
14	April 17	Royals	7 – 6	Ledezma (3–0)	Riske (0–2)	Jones (7)	21,263	9–5
15	April 18	Royals	4 – 3 (10)	Soria (1–0)	Rodney (1–3)		27,945	9–6
16	April 20	White Sox	5 – 4	Masset (1–0)	Grilli (0–1)	Jenks (5)	40,685	9–7
17	April 21	White Sox	7 – 5 (10)	Aardsma (2–0)	Rodney (1–4)	Jenks (6)	39,618	9–8
18	April 22	White Sox	6 – 5 (12)	Grilli (1-1)	Masset (1-1)		38,379	10–8
19	April 23	@ Angels	9 – 5	Grilli (2–1)	Weaver (0–2)		40,563	11-8
20	April 24	@ Angels	9 – 8 (10)	Moseley (2–0)	Jones (0–1)		36,055	11-9
21	April 25	@ White Sox	6 – 2	Durbin (1-1)	Danks (0–3)		26,342	12–9
--	April 26	@ White Sox	Postponed (rain) Rescheduled for July 24					12–9
22	April 27	Twins	5 – 3	Crain (1-1)	Zumaya (0–1)	Nathan (7)	31,147	12-10
23	April 28	Twins	11 – 3	Silva (2–1)	Verlander (1-1)		39,547	12–11
24	April 29	Twins	4 – 3	Jones (1-1)	Crain (1–2)		36,483	13–11
25	April 30	Orioles	8 – 4	Bonderman (1–0)	Cabrera (1–3)	Rodney (1)	24,914	14–11

May

#	Date	Opponent	Score	Win	Loss	Save	Attendance	Record
26	May 1	Orioles	5 – 4	Zumaya (1-1)	Báez (0–1)	Jones (9)	23,126	15–11
27	May 2	Orioles	3 – 2	Robertson (3–1)	Trachsel (1–3)	Jones (10)	29,278	16–11
28	May 4	@ Royals	6 – 3	Verlander (2–1)	Bannister (0–2)	Jones (11)	17,614	17–11
29	May 5	@ Royals	7 – 5	Mesa (1-1)	Duckworth (0–2)	Jones (12)	26,070	18–11
30	May 6	@ Royals	13 – 4	Durbin (2–1)	Greinke (1–4)		17,034	19–11
31	May 8	Mariners	9 – 7	Bonderman (2–0)	Ramírez (2-2)	Jones (13)	30,171	20–11
32	May 9	Mariners	9 – 2	Baek (1–0)	Robertson (3–2)		27,377	20–12
33	May 10	Mariners	7 – 3	Verlander (3–1)	Weaver (0–6)		37,359	21–12
34	May 11	@ Twins	7 – 3	Maroth (3–0)	Santana (4–3)		31,458	22–12
35	May 12	@ Twins	8 – 2	Durbin (3–1)	Ponson (2–5)		32,176	23–12
36	May 13	@ Twins	16 – 4	Bonser (1-1)	Vasquez (0–1)		25,037	23–13
37	May 14	@ Red Sox	7 – 1	Matsuzaka (5–2)	Robertson (3-3)		36,935	23–14
38	May 15	@ Red Sox	7 – 2	Verlander (4–1)	Wakefield (4-4)		37,031	24–14
--	May 16	@ Red Sox	Postponed (rain) Rescheduled for May 17					24–14
39	May 17	@ Red Sox	2 – 1	Tavárez (2–4)	Miner (0–1)	Papelbon (11)	36,767	24-15
40	May 17	@ Red Sox	4 – 2	Donnelly (2–1)	Ledezma (3–2)	Okajima (2)	37,006	24–16
41	May 18	Cardinals	14 – 4	Miller (1–0)	Looper (5–3)		40,816	25-16
42	May 19	Cardinals	8 – 7	Robertson (4–3)	Reyes (0–7)	Jones (14)	42,625	26–16
43	May 20	Cardinals	6 – 3	Verlander (5–1)	Thompson (2–1)	Seay (1)	39,562	27–16
44	May 22	Angels	6 – 3	Lackey (7–3)	Maroth (3–1)	Rodríguez (14)	28,678	27–17
45	May 23	Angels	8 – 7	Durbin (4–1)	Colón (5–1)	Jones (15)	28,105	28–17
46	May 24	Angels	12 – 0	Bonderman (3–0)	Santana (3–6)		36,048	29–17
47	May 25	Indians	7 – 4	Byrd (5–1)	Robertson (4-4)	Borowski (15)	40,074	29–18
48	May 26	Indians	6 – 3	Sabathia (7–1)	Grilli (2-2)	Borowski (16)	40,375	29–19
49	May 27	Indians	5 – 3	Carmona (6–1)	Maroth (3–2)	Borowski (17)	40,723	29–20
50	May 28	@ Devil Rays	6 – 5	Glover (2-2)	Jones (1–2)		14,769	29–21
51	May 29	@ Devil Rays	14 – 2	Bonderman (4–0)	Fossum (3–5)		11,518	30–21
52	May 30	@ Devil Rays	5 – 3	Shields (4–0)	Robertson (4–5)		12,435	30–22
53	May 31	@ Indians	11 – 5	Sabathia (8–1)	Verlander (5–2)		30,038	30–23

June

#	Date	Opponent	Score	Win	Loss	Save	Attendance	Record
54	June 1	@ Indians	12 – 11	Hernández (1–3)	Jones (1–3)		41,365	30–24
55	June 2	@ Indians	9 – 5	Durbin (5–1)	Lee (2–3)		38,254	31–24
56	June 3	@ Indians	9 – 2	Bonderman (5–0)	Sowers (1–6)		30,268	32–24
57	June 5	@ Rangers	7 – 4	Eyre (2-2)	Robertson (4–6)	Gagné (5)	32,003	32–25
58	June 6	@ Rangers	10 – 0	Verlander (6–2)	Millwood (2–5)		28,795	33–25
59	June 7	@ Rangers	11 – 4	Maroth (4–2)	Loe (1–6)		22,990	34–25
60	June 8	Mets	3 – 0	Sosa (6–1)	Durbin (5–2)	Wagner (14)	42,007	34–26
61	June 9	Mets	8 – 7	Bonderman (6–0)	Pérez (6–5)	Jones (16)	42,364	35–26
62	June 10	Mets	15 – 7	Miller (2–0)	Glavine (5–4)		40,914	36–26
63	June 12	Brewers	4 – 0	Verlander (7–2)	Suppan (7-7)		33,555	37–26
64	June 13	Brewers	3 – 2	Spurling (1–0)	Rodney (1–5)	Cordero (23)	37,593	37–27
65	June 14	Brewers	6 – 5	Sheets (7–3)	Durbin (5–3)	Cordero (24)	41,390	37–28
66	June 15	@ Phillies	12 – 8	Bonderman (7–0)	Lieber (3–5)		42,719	38–28
67	June 16	@ Phillies	6 – 3	Moyer (6–5)	Miller (2–1)		45,102	38-29
68	June 17	@ Phillies	7 – 4	Verlander (8–2)	Geary (1–2)	Jones (17)	45,537	39–29
69	June 18	@ Nationals	9 – 8	Maroth (5–2)	Chico (3–5)		22,562	40–29
70	June 19	@ Nationals	15 – 1	Durbin (6–3)	Simontacchi (4–5)		22,227	41–29
71	June 20	@ Nationals	8 – 4	Bonderman (8–0)	Rivera (1–2)		26,637	42–29
72	June 22	@ Braves	5 – 0	Rogers (1–0)	Smoltz (8–4)		44,034	43–29
73	June 23	@ Braves	2 – 1	Verlander (9–2)	Davies (3–7)	Jones (18)	49,074	44–29
74	June 24	@ Braves	5 – 0	Miller (3–1)	James (6–7)	Durbin (1)	34,181	45–29
75	June 25	Rangers	8 – 3	Loe (4–6)	Bonderman (8–1)		36,330	45–30
76	June 26	Rangers	9 – 6	Otsuka (2–1)	Jones (1–4)	Gagné (8)	39,709	45–31
--	June 27	Rangers	Postponed (rain) Rescheduled for September 11					45–31
77	June 28	Rangers	5 – 2	Rogers (2–0)	Millwood (4–7)	Jones (19)	37,253	46–31
78	June 29	Twins	11 – 1	Santana (9–6)	Verlander (9–3)		42,361	46–32
79	June 30	Twins	8 – 5	Slowey (3–0)	Miller (3–2)	Nathan (16)	41,588	46–33

July

#	Date	Opponent	Score	Win	Loss	Save	Attendance	Record
80	July 1	Twins	1 – 0	Bonderman (9–1)	Baker (2–3)	Jones (20)	41,078	47–33
81	July 3	Indians	5 – 4 (11)	Mastny (6–2)	Capellán (0–3)	Borowski (25)	40,741	47–34
82	July 4	Indians	6 – 4	Rogers (3–0)	Westbrook (1–4)	Jones (21)	40,782	48–34
83	July 5	Indians	12 – 3	Verlander (10–3)	Sabathia (12–3)		40,923	49–34
84	July 6	Red Sox	9 – 2	Miller (4–2)	Tavárez (5–7)		43,839	50–34
85	July 7	Red Sox	3 – 2 (13)	Grilli (3–2)	Papelbon (0–2)		44,193	51–34
86	July 8	Red Sox	6 – 5	Robertson (5–6)	Matsuzaka (10–6)	Jones (22)	41,943	52–34
87	July 12	@ Mariners	3 – 2	Hernández (6–4)	Miller (4–3)	Putz (25)	31,994	52–35
88	July 13	@ Mariners	6 – 3	Bonderman (10–1)	Washburn (8–7)	Jones (23)	37,393	53–35
89	July 14	@ Mariners	6 – 4	Batista (9–7)	Rogers (3–1)	Putz (26)	38,202	53–36
90	July 15	@ Mariners	11 – 7	Verlander (11–3)	Weaver (2–7)		39,073	54–36
91	July 17	@ Twins	1 – 0	Robertson (6-6)	Garza (1-1)	Jones (24)	30,939	55–36
92	July 18	@ Twins	3 – 2	Miller (5–3)	Santana (10–7)	Jones (25)	38,070	56–36
93	July 19	@ Twins	4 – 3 (10)	Miner (1-1)	Nathan (3–2)	Jones (26)	36,551	57–36
94	July 20	Royals	10 – 2	Meche (7–6)	Rogers (3–2)		43,200	57–37
95	July 21	Royals	10 – 8 (10)	Durbin (7–3)	Soria (1–3)		43,408	58–37
96	July 22	Royals	5 – 2	Bannister (6-6)	Robertson (6–7)		42,201	58–38
97	July 23	@ White Sox	9 – 6	Grilli (4–2)	Buehrle (7–6)	Jones (27)	30,122	59–38
98	July 24	@ White Sox	5 – 3	Vázquez (8–5)	Bonderman (10–2)	Jenks (27)	30,569	59–39
99	July 24	@ White Sox	8 – 7	Thornton (3-3)	Miner (1–2)	Jenks (28)	29,042	59–40
100	July 25	@ White Sox	13 – 9	Grilli (5–2)	Contreras (5–13)	Byrdak (1)	28,462	60–40
101	July 26	@ White Sox	4 – 3	Jenks (3–4)	Miner (1–3)		30,567	60–41
102	July 27	@ Angels	11 – 6	Weaver (7–5)	Robertson (6–8)		44,042	60–42
103	July 28	@ Angels	10 – 3	Shields (3-3)	Grilli (5–3)		43,122	60–43
104	July 29	@ Angels	13 – 4	Bootcheck (3–2)	Bonderman (10–3)		44,019	60–44
105	July 30	@ Athletics	5 – 2	Tata (1–0)	Blanton (8-8)	Jones (28)	18,468	61–44
106	July 31	@ Athletics	7 – 3	Haren (13–3)	Verlander (11–4)		21,305	61–45

August

#	Date	Opponent	Score	Win	Loss	Save	Attendance	Record
107	August 1	@ Athletics	3 – 2	Brown (1–0)	Robertson (6–9)	Embree (12)	27,118	61–46
108	August 3	White Sox	7 – 4	Buehrle (9–6)	Miller (5–4)		42,066	61–47
109	August 4	White Sox	7 – 5	Vázquez (9–6)	Bonderman (10–4)	Jenks (31)	42,907	61–48
110	August 5	White Sox	3 – 1	Floyd (1-1)	Tata (1-1)	Jenks (32)	39,778	61–49
111	August 6	@ Devil Rays	6 – 4	Miner (2–3)	Glover (5–4)	Jones (29)	39,289	62–49
112	August 7	@ Devil Rays	9 – 6	Byrdak (1–0)	Wheeler (1–5)	Jones (30)	35,288	63–49
113	August 8	@ Devil Rays	7 – 1	Shields (9–7)	Durbin (7–4)		37,777	63–50
114	August 9	@ Devil Rays	8 – 1	Kazmir (9–7)	Bonderman (10–5)		38,789	63–51
115	August 10	Athletics	16 – 10	Lugo (3–0)	McBride (1-1)		40,922	63–52
116	August 11	Athletics	5 – 2	Verlander (12–4)	Haren (13–4)	Jones (31)	42,016	64–52
117	August 12	Athletics	11 – 6	Robertson (7–9)	Braden (1–7)		39,960	65–52
118	August 13	Athletics	7 – 2	Gaudin (9–8)	Durbin (7–5)		37,229	65–53
119	August 14	@ Indians	6 – 2 (10)	Rodney (2–5)	Borowski (2–5)		37,570	66–53
120	August 15	@ Indians	5 – 2	Carmona (14–7)	Jurrjens (0–1)	Borowski (33)	39,250	66–54
121	August 16	@ Yankees	8 – 5	Verlander (13–4)	Mussina (8-8)		53,914	67–54
122	August 17	@ Yankees	6 – 1	Pettitte (10–7)	Robertson (7–10)		54,290	67–55
123	August 18	@ Yankees	5 – 2	Clemens (5-5)	Durbin (7–6)	Rivera (20)	54,702	67–56
124	August 19	@ Yankees	9 – 3	Wang (14–6)	Bonderman (10–6)	Ramirez (1)	55,071	67–57
125	August 21	Indians	2 – 1	Jurrjens (1-1)	Carmona (14–8)	Jones (32)	42,868	68–57
126	August 22	Indians	11 – 8	Byrd (12–5)	Verlander (13–5)	Borowski (35)	40,914	68–58
127	August 23	Indians	3 – 1 (10)	Pérez (1-1)	Zumaya (1–2)	Borowski (36)	40,946	68–59
128	August 24	Yankees	9 – 6 (11)	Durbin (8–6)	Henn (2-2)		44,163	69–59
129	August 25	Yankees	7 – 2	Wang (15–6)	Bonderman (10–7)		44,250	69–60
130	August 26	Yankees	5 – 4	Seay (1–0)	Hughes (2-2)	Jones (33)	43,268	70–60
131	August 27	Yankees	16 – 0	Verlander (14–5)	Mussina (8–10)		42,428	71–60
132	August 28	@ Royals	6 – 3	Bannister (11–7)	Robertson (7–11)		16,193	71–61
133	August 29	@ Royals	5 – 0	Braun (2–0)	Miller (5-5)	Riske (4)	11,628	71–62
134	August 30	@ Royals	6 – 1	Bonderman (11–7)	Núñez (2-2)		11,196	72–62
135	August 31	@ Athletics	5 – 4 (10)	Street (3–2)	Zumaya (1–3)		27,250	72–63

September

#	Date	Opponent	Score	Win	Loss	Save	Attendance	Record
136	September 1	@ Athletics	6 – 1	Verlander (15–5)	Haren (14–6)		21,336	73–63
137	September 2	@ Athletics	8 – 7 (10)	Street (4–2)	Bazardo (0–1)		23,195	73–64
138	September 4	White Sox	3 – 1	Garland (9–10)	Bonderman (11–8)	Jenks (37)	32,505	73–65
139	September 5	White Sox	2 – 1 (11)	Seay (2–0)	Phillips (0–1)		32,980	74–65
140	September 6	White Sox	3 – 2	Seay (3–0)	Jenks (3–5)		35,977	75–65
141	September 7	Mariners	6 – 1	Verlander (16–5)	Batista (13–11)		39,750	76–65
142	September 8	Mariners	12 – 6	Miner (3-3)	Weaver (6–12)		42,184	77–65
143	September 9	Mariners	14 – 7	Hernández (12–7)	Bonderman (11–9)		39,990	77–66
144	September 10	Blue Jays	5 – 4	Bazardo (1-1)	Janssen (2–3)		35,689	78–66
145	September 11	Rangers	13 – 6	Padilla (6–9)	Durbin (8–7)		32,719	78–67
146	September 11	Rangers	4 – 1	Jurrjens (2–1)	McCarthy (5–9)	Jones (34)	33,840	79–67
147	September 12	Rangers	5 – 1	Verlander (17–5)	Vólquez (2–1)		32,490	80–67
148	September 14	@ Twins	4 – 2	Robertson (8–11)	Garza (3–6)	Jones (35)	22,282	81–67
149	September 15	@ Twins	4 – 3	Zumaya (2–3)	Santana (15–12)	Jones (36)	35,230	82–67
150	September 16	@ Twins	6 – 4	Jurrjens (3–1)	Baker (9–8)	Jones (37)	21,771	83–67
151	September 17	@ Indians	6 – 5 (11)	Betancourt (5–1)	Miner (3–4)		28,825	83–68
152	September 18	@ Indians	7 – 4	Lewis (1-1)	Verlander (17–6)	Borowski (41)	41,103	83–69
153	September 19	@ Indians	4 – 2	Sabathia (18–7)	Robertson (8–12)	Borowski (42)	32,511	83–70
154	September 21	Royals	5 – 4	Byrdak (2–0)	Núñez (2–4)	Jones (38)	40,117	84–70
155	September 22	Royals	7 – 4	Davies (7–14)	Rogers (3-3)		41,792	84–71
156	September 23	Royals	7 – 2	Verlander (18–6)	de la Rosa (8–12)		40,068	85–71
157	September 24	Twins	2 – 0	Silva (13–14)	Robertson (8–13)	Nathan (35)	32,716	85–72
158	September 25	Twins	8 – 0	Bazardo (2–1)	Garza (4–7)		31,394	86–72
159	September 26	Twins	9 – 4 (6)	Byrdak (3–0)	Blackburn (0–1)		35,375	87–72
160	September 28	@ White Sox	5 – 2	J. Vázquez (15–8)	Rogers (3–4)	Jenks (40)	30,281	87–73
161	September 29	@ White Sox	3 – 2	Wassermann (1-1)	Rodney (2–6)		33,066	87–74
162	September 30	@ White Sox	13 – 3	Robertson (9–13)	Contreras (10–17)		33,154	88–74

== Player stats ==
=== Batting ===
Note: G = Games played; AB = At bats; H = Hits; Avg. = Batting average; HR = Home runs; RBI = Runs batted in

Player	G	AB	H	Avg.	HR	RBI
Timo Pérez	29	90	35	.389	0	13
**Magglio Ordóñez**	157	595	216	.363	28	139
**Plácido Polanco**	142	587	200	.341	9	67
Ryan Raburn	49	138	42	.304	4	27
**Curtis Granderson**	158	612	185	.302	23	74
**Carlos Guillén**	151	564	167	.296	21	102
Sean Casey	143	453	134	.296	4	54
Ramón Santiago	32	67	19	.284	0	7
**Iván Rodríguez**	129	502	141	.281	11	63
Omar Infante	66	166	45	.271	2	17
**Gary Sheffield**	133	494	131	.265	25	75
Mike Rabelo	51	168	43	.256	1	18
Marcus Thames	86	269	65	.242	18	54
**Brandon Inge**	151	508	120	.236	14	71
Mike Hessman	17	51	12	.235	4	12
Craig Monroe*	99	343	76	.222	11	55
Neifi Pérez	33	64	11	.172	1	6
Cameron Maybin	24	49	7	.143	1	2
Brent Clevlen	13	10	1	.100	1	0
Pitcher totals	162	27	2	.074	0	1
**Team totals**	**162**	**5757**	**1652**	**.287**	**177**	**857**

* Player released or traded. Stats only reflect games with Tigers.

Players in Bold qualify for batting title.

=== Pitching ===
==== Starting and other pitchers ====
Note: G = Games pitched; IP = Innings pitched; W = Wins; L = Losses; ERA = Earned run average; SO = Strikeouts

Player	G	IP	W	L	ERA	SO
Yorman Bazardo (1 HLD)	11	23.2	2	1	2.28	15
**Justin Verlander**	32	201.2	18	6	3.66	183
Kenny Rogers	11	63.0	3	4	4.43	36
Jair Jurrjens	7	30.2	3	1	4.70	13
Chad Durbin (3 HLD)	36	127.2	8	7	4.72	66
**Nate Robertson**	30	177.2	9	13	4.76	119
**Jeremy Bonderman**	28	174.1	11	9	5.01	145
Mike Maroth *	13	78.1	5	2	5.06	28
Andrew Miller	12	64.0	5	5	5.63	56
Jordan Tata	3	14.0	1	1	7.71	8
Virgil Vasquez	5	16.2	0	1	8.64	7

* Player released or traded. Stats only reflect games with Tigers.

Players in Bold qualify for ERA title.

==== Relief pitchers ====
Note: G = Games pitched; IP = Innings pitched; W= Wins; L= Losses; SV = Saves; HLD = Holds; ERA = Earned run average; SO = Strikeouts

Player	G	IP	W	L	SV	HLD	ERA	SO
Bobby Seay	58	46.1	3	0	1	10	2.33	38
Zach Miner	34	53.2	3	4	0	9	3.02	34
Tim Byrdak	39	45.0	3	0	1	8	3.20	49
Todd Jones	63	61.1	1	4	38	0	4.26	33
Fernando Rodney	48	50.2	2	6	1	12	4.26	54
Joel Zumaya	28	33.2	2	3	1	7	4.28	27
Jason Grilli	57	79.2	5	3	0	11	4.74	62
Wilfredo Ledezma *	23	35.2	3	1	0	2	4.79	24
Aquilino López	10	17.1	0	0	1	1	5.19	7
Macay McBride	20	17.2	0	1	0	4	6.11	13
José Capellán	10	14.0	0	1	0	1	6.43	12
Eulogio de la Cruz	6	6.2	0	0	0	0	6.75	5
Clay Rapada	4	2.1	0	0	0	0	11.57	4
José Mesa *	16	11.2	1	1	0	3	12.34	9
**Team Pitching Totals**	**162**	**1447.1**	**88**	**74**	**44**	**72**	**4.57**	**1047**

* Player released or traded. Stats only reflect games with Tigers.

== Farm system ==
Level	Team	League	Manager
AAA	Toledo Mud Hens	International League	Larry Parrish
AA	Erie SeaWolves	Eastern League	Matt Walbeck
A	Lakeland Flying Tigers	Florida State League	Kevin Bradshaw
A	West Michigan Whitecaps	Midwest League	Tom Brookens
A-Short Season	Oneonta Tigers	New York–Penn League	Andy Barkett
Rookie	GCL Tigers	Gulf Coast League	Benny Castillo

LEAGUE CHAMPIONS: West Michigan
