= 2007 Kansas City Royals season =

2007 Kansas City Royals
- League: American League
- Division: Central
- Ballpark: Kauffman Stadium
- City: Kansas City, Missouri
- Record: 69–93 (.426)
- Divisional place: 5th
- Owners: David Glass
- General managers: Dayton Moore
- Managers: Buddy Bell
- Television: KMCI; RSTN
- Radio: WHB 810AM; KCXM 97.3FM

The 2007 Kansas City Royals season was the 39th season for the franchise, and their 35th at Kauffman Stadium. The season began with the team attempting to win the American League Central - a task not achieved since the division was formed in 1994.

In trying to improve on their 62–100 record in the 2006 season, the team avoided a fourth straight 100-loss season. Buddy Bell returned for his second and final full season as manager, while Dayton Moore began his first season as the team's general manager.

Anticipation surrounded the Royals' newfound approach to once again become a playoff contender with rebuilding the roster. Roster moves generated much interest in the Kansas City area, including the big-budget signing of starting pitcher Gil Meche, and the arrival of young, new talent—such as rookie third baseman Alex Gordon and designated hitter Billy Butler. The team's payroll for the 2007 season was increased to $67 million (22nd in the major leagues).

== Free agency and roster moves ==
The biggest free-agent pickups for the Royals in 2007 included RHP Gil Meche—who was signed to a 5-year, $55 million deal—and RHP Octavio Dotel, who quickly became trade bait to the Atlanta Braves.

Royals activity in free agency
- (x) = club option for 2007
- (m) = mutual option for 2007
- (y) = player option for 2007

Color Code Key

Color	Meaning
Green	Player will return to team
Light Green	Player joins team
Crimson	Player will not return to team (released, option not exercised, signed with new team, or retired)
White	Player's status undetermined

Player	Position	2006 Team	2007 Team	Comments
Steve Andrade	RP	Royals	Devil Rays	Signed a minor league contract
Paul Bako	C	Royals	Orioles	Signed for 1 year
Adam Bernero	SP	Royals	Red Sox	Signed a minor league contract
Dewon Brazelton	SP	Padres	Royals	Signed a minor league contract
Jose Diaz	RP	Royals	None	Did not return in 2007
Scott Dohmann	RHP	Royals	Devil Rays	Signed one-year contract
Octavio Dotel	RHP	Yankees	Royals	Signed for 1 year, $5 M
Brandon Duckworth	RHP	Royals	Royals	Signed a minor league contract
Seth Etherton	RP	Royals	None	Did not return in 2007
Wayne Franklin	RP	Braves	Royals	Signed a minor league contract
Alex S. Gonzalez	3B	Phillies	Royals	Signed a minor league contract
Runelvys Hernández	RHP	Royals	Red Sox	Signed a minor league contract
Ken Harvey	IF	Royals	Twins	Signed a minor league contract
Jason LaRue	C	Reds	Royals	Signed by Reds to a two-year contract, then traded to Royals
Gil Meche	RHP	Mariners	Royals	Signed for 5 years, $55 M
Doug Mientkiewicz	IF	Royals	Yankees	Signed one-year contract
Mark Redman	LHP	Royals	Braves	Signed a minor league contract
David Riske	RHP	White Sox	Royals	Signed one-year contract with club option
Kerry Robinson	OF	Royals	Red Sox	Signed a minor league contract
Jason Shiell	RHP	Braves	Royals	Signed a minor league contract
Jason Standridge	RHP	Mets	Royals	Signed a minor league contract

== Regular season ==
=== Season summary ===
==== April ====
The Royals began the season with expectations of improvement from their fans, and the team never ceased to impress in their home opener against the Boston Red Sox. The Royals defeated the Red Sox 7–1 in front of the sold-out home crowd. The magic did not last, however—Kansas City was just 3–7 through the first ten games of the season, and 8–18 by the end of April.

==== May ====
The Royals hit minor spots of winning when the team won 8 of 10 games from May 13 to 23, but finished the month of May on a seven-game losing streak with series sweeps by the Seattle Mariners and Baltimore Orioles. Kansas City went 11–17 in May and finished the month with an overall record of 19–35.

==== June ====
In the 2007 MLB draft held on June 7, the Royals selected shortstop Mike Moustakas at No. 2 overall. The team went 15–12 in June, their first winning month since July 2003. Pitcher Brian Bannister won the American League Rookie of the Month Award.

==== July ====
Gil Meche was the only Royal selected to represent the team at the 2007 Major League Baseball All-Star Game in San Francisco. At the All-Star break, the Royals had a record of 38–50 and the lowest team ERA in 13 years. On July 31, the Royals traded pitcher Octavio Dotel to the Atlanta Braves for pitcher Kyle Davies. The Royals went 13–12 in July, giving the team its first consecutive winning months since June and July 2003. Billy Butler won the Rookie of the Month Award.

==== August ====
On August 1, manager Buddy Bell announced his intention to resign following the 2007 season before a game against the Minnesota Twins. Also, about an hour before the first pitch, the Interstate 35W bridge over the Mississippi River in downtown Minneapolis collapsed with a death toll of at 13. Before the game, a moment of silence was held for the victims of the collapse. The team rescheduled their August 2 game against the Twins to the afternoon of August 31 for a double-header. Brian Bannister won his second Rookie of the Month Award for the season. The Royals went 13–15 in August, completing a three-month stretch in which the team compiled a record of 41–39.

==== September ====
On September 12, the Royals defeated the Minnesota Twins 6–3 to win their 63rd game, guaranteeing that they would not lose 100 games in 2007. The victory ended the team's string of three consecutive seasons of 100 losses of more from 2004 to 2006. While the Royals struggled with a 9–19 record in September, their overall record of 69–93 was the team's best finish since 2003.

=== Season standings ===
AL Central
Team	W	L	Pct.	GB	Home	Road
Cleveland Indians	96	66	.593	—	51‍–‍29	45‍–‍37
Detroit Tigers	88	74	.543	8	45‍–‍36	43‍–‍38
Minnesota Twins	79	83	.488	17	41‍–‍40	38‍–‍43
Chicago White Sox	72	90	.444	24	38‍–‍43	34‍–‍47
Kansas City Royals	69	93	.426	27	35‍–‍46	34‍–‍47

=== Record vs. opponents ===
2007 American League record Source: MLB Standings Grid – 2007
Team	BAL	BOS	CWS	CLE	DET	KC	LAA	MIN	NYY	OAK	SEA	TB	TEX	TOR	NL
Baltimore	—	6–12	5–3	3–4	1–5	7–0	3–7	0–7	9–9	4–4	2–7	11–7	4–6	8–10	6–12
Boston	12–6	—	7–1	5–2	3–4	3–3	6–4	4–3	8–10	4–4	4–5	13–5	6–4	9–9	12–6
Chicago	3–5	1–7	—	7–11	11–7	12–6	5–4	9–9	4–6	4–5	1–7	6–1	2–4	3–4	4–14
Cleveland	4–3	2–5	11–7	—	12–6	11–7	5–5	14–4	0–6	6–4	4–3	8–2	6–3	4–2	9–9
Detroit	5–1	4–3	7–11	6–12	—	11–7	3–5	12–6	4–4	4–6	6–4	3–4	5–4	4–3	14–4
Kansas City	0–7	3–3	6–12	7–11	7–11	—	5–2	9–9	1–9	6–4	3–6	4–3	5–4	3–4	10–8
Los Angeles	7–3	4–6	4–5	5–5	5–3	2–5	—	6–3	6–3	9–10	13–6	6–2	10–9	3–4	14–4
Minnesota	7–0	3–4	9–9	4–14	6–12	9–9	3–6	—	2–5	5–2	6–3	3–4	7–2	4–6	11–7
New York	9–9	10–8	6–4	6–0	4–4	9–1	3–6	5–2	—	2–4	5–5	10–8	5–1	10–8	10–8
Oakland	4–4	4–4	5–4	4–6	6–4	4–6	10–9	2–5	4–2	—	5–14	4–6	9–10	5–4	10–8
Seattle	7–2	5–4	7–1	3–4	4–6	6–3	6–13	3–6	5–5	14–5	—	4–3	11–8	4–5	9–9
Tampa Bay	7–11	5–13	1–6	2–8	4–3	3–4	2–6	4–3	8–10	6–4	3–4	—	5–4	9–9	7–11
Texas	6–4	4–6	4–2	3–6	4–5	4–5	9–10	2–7	1–5	10–9	8–11	4–5	—	5–5	11–7
Toronto	10–8	9–9	4–3	2–4	3–4	4–3	4–3	6–4	8–10	4–5	5–4	9–9	5–5	—	10–8

=== Roster ===
2007 Kansas City Royals
Roster
Pitchers: 49 John Bale; 40 Brian Bannister; 47 Ryan Z. Braun; 38 Billy Buckner; 28 Kyle Davies; 36 Jorge de la Rosa; 28 Octavio Dotel; 31 Brandon Duckworth; 37 Scott Elarton; 41 Jimmy Gobble; 23 Zack Greinke; 44 Luke Hochevar; 34 Luke Hudson; 55 Gil Meche; 58 Neal Musser; 43 Leo Núñez; 57 Joel Peralta; 45 Odalis Pérez; 54 David Riske; 48 Joakim Soria; 30 Jason Standridge; 52,66 John Thomson; 56 Todd Wellemeyer	Catchers: 14 John Buck; 6 Jason LaRue; 12 Paul Phillips; Infielders: 4 Ángel Berroa; 39 Craig Brazell; 21 Billy Butler; 30 Fernando Cortez; 3 Esteban Germán; 11 Ross Gload; 7 Alex Gordon; 15 Mark Grudzielanek; 1 Tony Peña Jr.; 43 Ryan Shealy; 26 Jason Smith; 29 Mike Sweeney	Outfielders: 35,42 Emil Brown; 32 Shane Costa; 9 David DeJesus; 2 Joey Gathright; 30 Justin Huber; 16,42 Reggie Sanders; 24 Mark Teahen	Manager: 25 Buddy Bell; Coaches: 8 Mike Barnett (hitting); 19 Bill Doran (bench); 18 Fred Kendall (bullpen); 33 Bob McClure (pitching); 49 Brian Poldberg (first base); 17 Luis Silverio (third base)

=== Game log ===
2007 game log
April

#	Date	Opponent	Score	Win	Loss	Save	Attendance	Record
1	April 2	Red Sox	7 – 1	Meche (1–0)	Schilling (0–1)		41,257	1–0
2	April 4	Red Sox	7 – 1	Beckett (1–0)	Pérez (0–1)		22,348	1-1
3	April 5	Red Sox	4 – 1	Matsuzaka (1–0)	Greinke (0–1)	Papelbon (1)	23,170	1–2
4	April 6	Tigers	3 – 1	de la Rosa (1–0)	Mesa (0–1)	Riske (1)	13,330	2-2
5	April 7	Tigers	6 – 5	Maroth (1–0)	Meche (1-1)	Jones (2)	13,899	2–3
6	April 8	Tigers	3 – 2	Rodney (1-1)	Riske (0–1)	Jones (3)	13,109	2–4
7	April 9	@ Blue Jays	9 – 1	Burnett (1-1)	Pérez (0–2)		50,125	2–5
8	April 10	@ Blue Jays	5 – 3	Greinke (1-1)	Towers (0–1)	Soria (1)	22,106	3–5
9	April 11	@ Blue Jays	7 – 4	Chacín (1–0)	de la Rosa (1-1)	Ryan (3)	15,218	3–6
10	April 12	@ Orioles	2 – 1 (10)	Ray (1-1)	Standridge (0–1)		13,229	3–7
11	April 13	@ Orioles	8 – 1	Bédard (2–1)	Duckworth (0–1)		20,922	3–8
12	April 14	@ Orioles	6 – 4	Williamson (1–0)	Peralta (0–1)	Ray (3)	15,244	3–9
--	April 15	@ Orioles	Postponed (rain) Rescheduled for September 24					3–9
13	April 16	@ Tigers	12 – 5	Verlander (1–0)	Greinke (1–2)		21,832	3–10
14	April 17	@ Tigers	7 – 6	Ledezma (3–0)	Riske (0–2)	Jones (7)	21,263	3–11
15	April 18	@ Tigers	4 – 3 (10)	Soria (1–0)	Rodney (1–3)		27,945	4–11
16	April 20	Twins	11 – 7	Pérez (1–2)	Ponson (1–2)	Riske (2)	31,813	5–11
17	April 21	Twins	7 – 5	Neshek (2–0)	Peralta (0–2)	Nathan (6)	20,566	5–12
18	April 22	Twins	3 – 1	de la Rosa (2–1)	Ortiz (3–1)	Soria (2)	14,801	6–12
19	April 23	White Sox	7 – 4	Buehrle (2–0)	Gobble (0–1)	Jenks (7)	12,265	6–13
20	April 24	White Sox	9 – 7	Logan (1–0)	Soria (1-1)	Jenks (8)	14,907	6–14
21	April 25	@ Twins	4 – 3	Pérez (2-2)	Ponson (1–3)	Soria (3)	21,496	7–14
22	April 26	@ Twins	1 – 0 (11)	Rincón (1–0)	Wellemeyer (0–1)		18,520	7–15
23	April 27	@ Mariners	7 – 4	Ramírez (2–1)	de la Rosa (2-2)	Putz (3)	37,281	7–16
24	April 28	@ Mariners	8 – 3	Meche (2–1)	Weaver (0–4)	Duckworth (1)	32,441	8–16
25	April 29	@ Mariners	5 – 1	Morrow (2–0)	Bannister (0–1)		26,019	8–17
26	April 30	Angels	3 – 1	Lackey (4–2)	Pérez (2–3)	Rodríguez (9)	10,866	8–18

May

#	Date	Opponent	Score	Win	Loss	Save	Attendance	Record
27	May 1	Angels	7 – 5	Colón (3–0)	Greinke (1–3)	Rodríguez (10)	11,225	8–19
28	May 2	Angels	3 – 1	de la Rosa (3–2)	Santana (2–4)	Soria (4)	9,697	9–19
29	May 3	Angels	5 – 2	Meche (3–1)	Weaver (1–3)	Soria (5)	12,683	10–19
30	May 4	Tigers	6 – 3	Verlander (2–1)	Bannister (0–2)	Jones (11)	17,614	10–20
31	May 5	Tigers	7 – 5	Mesa (1-1)	Duckworth (0–2)	Jones (12)	26,070	10–21
32	May 6	Tigers	13 – 4	Durbin (2–1)	Greinke (1–4)		17,034	10–22
33	May 8	Athletics	6 – 1	Gaudin (2–1)	de la Rosa (3-3)		10,989	10–23
34	May 9	Athletics	3 – 2	Gobble (1-1)	Duchscherer (3–2)	Soria (6)	10,974	11–23
35	May 10	Athletics	17 – 3	Kennedy (1–2)	Hudson (0–1)		31,006	11–24
36	May 11	@ White Sox	2 – 1	Garland (2-2)	Pérez (2–4)	Jenks (12)	34,522	11–25
37	May 12	@ White Sox	5 – 4 (10)	MacDougal (1–0)	Duckworth (0–3)		36,702	11–26
38	May 13	@ White Sox	11 – 1	de la Rosa (4–3)	Vázquez (2-2)		34,468	12–26
39	May 14	@ Athletics	2 – 1	Gobble (2–1)	Duchscherer (3-3)	Soria (7)	12,477	13–26
40	May 15	@ Athletics	5 – 4 (11)	DiNardo (1-1)	Soria (1–2)		14,966	13–27
41	May 16	@ Athletics	4 – 3	Gobble (3–1)	Calero (0–3)	Riske (3)	16,242	14–27
42	May 17	@ Athletics	7 – 4	Elarton (1–0)	Braden (1–3)	Soria (8)	21,037	15–27
43	May 18	@ Rockies	5 – 2	Duckworth (1–3)	Corpas (0–2)	Soria (9)	22,399	16–27
44	May 19	@ Rockies	6 – 4	Buchholz (2-2)	Meche (3–2)	Fuentes (11)	24,017	16–28
45	May 20	@ Rockies	10 – 5 (12)	Peralta (1–2)	Ramírez (1-1)		25,829	17–28
46	May 22	Indians	4 – 3	Greinke (2–4)	Mastny (3–2)	Soria (10)	19,776	18–28
47	May 23	Indians	11 – 7	Duckworth (2–3)	Lee (2–1)		11,506	19–28
48	May 24	Indians	10 – 3	Sowers (1–4)	de la Rosa (4-4)		11,681	19–29
49	May 25	Mariners	10 – 2	Hernández (3–2)	Meche (3-3)		28,651	19–30
50	May 26	Mariners	9 – 1	Baek (2-2)	Bannister (0–3)		21,138	19–31
51	May 27	Mariners	7 – 4	Washburn (5–4)	Pérez (2–5)	Putz (12)	16,091	19–32
52	May 28	Orioles	9 – 1	Trachsel (4–3)	Elarton (1-1)		14,758	19–33
53	May 29	Orioles	6 – 2	Guthrie (3–1)	de la Rosa (4–5)		13,556	19–34
54	May 30	Orioles	3 – 0	Bédard (4–3)	Meche (3–4)	Ray (12)	10,513	19–35

June

#	Date	Opponent	Score	Win	Loss	Save	Attendance	Record
55	June 1	@ Devil Rays	4 – 1	Bannister (1–3)	Kazmir (3-3)	Dotel (1)	12,032	20–35
56	June 2	@ Devil Rays	9 – 4	Pérez (3–5)	Jackson (0–7)		14,403	21–35
57	June 3	@ Devil Rays	5 – 1	Howell (1–0)	Elarton (1–2)		12,220	21–36
58	June 4	@ Devil Rays	4 – 2	Shields (5–0)	Meche (3–5)	Reyes (14)	9,435	21–37
59	June 5	@ Indians	1 – 0	Sabathia (9–1)	de la Rosa (4–6)		14,036	21–38
60	June 6	@ Indians	4 – 3	Bannister (2–3)	Byrd (6–2)	Dotel (2)	17,632	22–38
61	June 7	@ Indians	8 – 3	Carmona (7–1)	Pérez (3–6)		19,315	22–39
62	June 8	Phillies	8 – 4	Elarton (2-2)	García (1–5)	Dotel (3)	19,121	23–39
63	June 9	Phillies	4 – 0	Lieber (3–4)	Meche (3–6)		23,734	23–40
64	June 10	Phillies	17 – 5	Greinke (3–4)	Moyer (5-5)		16,034	24–40
65	June 12	Cardinals	8 – 1	Bannister (3-3)	Thompson (4–2)		29,354	25–40
66	June 13	Cardinals	7 – 3	Wainwright (5-5)	Pérez (3–7)		25,555	25–41
67	June 14	Cardinals	17 – 8	Greinke (4-4)	Wells (2–11)		28,837	26–41
68	June 15	Marlins	6 – 2	Meche (4–6)	Mitre (2–3)	Dotel (4)	28,015	27–41
69	June 16	Marlins	9 – 8	VandenHurk (2-2)	de la Rosa (4–7)	Gregg (11)	24,323	27–42
70	June 17	Marlins	5 – 4	Bannister (4–3)	Olsen (5–6)	Dotel (5)	19,433	28–42
71	June 18	@ Cardinals	5 – 3	Pérez (4–7)	Wainwright (5–6)	Dotel (6)	43,524	29–42
72	June 19	@ Cardinals	5 – 1	Thompson (5–2)	Elarton (2–3)		42,712	29–43
73	June 20	@ Cardinals	7 – 6 (14)	Wells (3–11)	de la Rosa (4–8)		42,623	29–44
74	June 22	@ Brewers	11 – 6	Suppan (8–7)	de la Rosa (4–9)		36,328	29–45
75	June 23	@ Brewers	7 – 1	Bush (5–6)	Bannister (4-4)		41,721	29–46
76	June 24	@ Brewers	4 – 3 (11)	Riske (1–2)	Capellán (0–2)	Gobble (1)	44,064	30–46
77	June 25	@ Angels	5 – 3	Thomson (1–0)	Lackey (10–5)	Dotel (7)	43,895	31–46
78	June 26	@ Angels	12 – 4	Meche (5–6)	Santana (5–8)		44,002	32–46
79	June 27	@ Angels	1 – 0	de la Rosa (5–9)	Weaver (6–4)	Dotel (8)	41,269	33–46
80	June 29	White Sox	8 – 1	Bannister (5–4)	Contreras (5–9)	Greinke (1)	20,525	34–46
81	June 30	White Sox	3 – 1 (10)	Bukvich (1–0)	Dotel (0–1)	Jenks (21)	25,119	34–47

July

#	Date	Opponent	Score	Win	Loss	Save	Attendance	Record
82	July 1	White Sox	3 – 1	Garland (6–5)	Thomson (1-1)	Jenks (22)	23,004	34–48
83	July 2	Mariners	3 – 2 (11)	Dotel (1-1)	Morrow (3–2)		13,257	35–48
84	July 3	Mariners	17 – 3	de la Rosa (6–9)	Feierabend (1–3)		28,140	36–48
85	July 4	Mariners	4 – 0	Washburn (8–6)	Bannister (5-5)	Putz (24)	27,797	36–49
86	July 6	Devil Rays	6 – 5	Shields (7–4)	Pérez (4–8)	Glover (1)	18,753	36–50
87	July 7	Devil Rays	8 – 7	Dotel (2–1)	Shawn Camp (0–3)		20,458	37–50
88	July 8	Devil Rays	12 – 4	de la Rosa (7–9)	Kazmir (5–6)		14,726	38–50
89	July 13	@ Indians	5 – 4	Borowski (2–3)	Greinke (4–5)		32,624	38–51
90	July 14	@ Indians	6 – 5	Meche (6-6)	Sabathia (12–4)	Dotel (9)	31,599	39–51
91	July 15	@ Indians	5 – 3	Carmona (11–4)	de la Rosa (7–10)	Borowski (26)	29,657	39–52
92	July 16	@ Red Sox	4 – 0	Gabbard (3–0)	Bannister (5–6)		37,099	39–53
93	July 17	@ Red Sox	9 – 3	Gobble (4–1)	Wakefield (10–9)		37,001	40–53
94	July 18	@ Red Sox	6 – 5	Pérez (5–8)	Tavárez (5–8)	Dotel (10)	36,681	41–53
95	July 20	@ Tigers	10 – 2	Meche (7–6)	Rogers (3–2)		43,200	42–53
96	July 21	@ Tigers	10 – 8 (10)	Durbin (7–3)	Soria (1–3)		43,408	42–54
97	July 22	@ Tigers	5 – 2	Bannister (6-6)	Robertson (6–7)		42,201	43–54
98	July 23	Yankees	9 – 2	Clemens (3–4)	Pérez (5–9)		30,746	43–55
99	July 24	Yankees	9 – 4	Wang (11–5)	Elarton (2–4)		38,212	43–56
100	July 25	Yankees	7 – 1	Mussina (5–7)	Meche (7-7)		28,460	43–57
101	July 26	Yankees	7 – 0	de la Rosa (8–10)	Igawa (2–3)		37,036	44–57
102	July 27	Rangers	6 – 1	Bannister (7–6)	Wright (3-3)		21,730	45–57
103	July 28	Rangers	6 – 5	Pérez (6–9)	Millwood (7–9)	Dotel (11)	27,700	46–57
104	July 29	Rangers	10 – 0	Núñez (1–0)	Loe (5–9)	Peralta (1)	15,638	47–57
105	July 30	@ Twins	3 – 1	Baker (5–4)	Meche (7–8)	Nathan (23)	23,628	47–58
106	July 31	@ Twins	5 – 3	Silva (9–11)	de la Rosa (8–11)	Nathan (24)	22,890	47–59

August

#	Date	Opponent	Score	Win	Loss	Save	Attendance	Record
107	August 1	@ Twins	5 – 3 (10)	Greinke (5-5)	Rincón (3–2)	Soria (11)	24,880	48–59
---	August 2	@ Twins	Postponed (I-35W bridge collapse) Rescheduled for August 31					48–59
108	August 3	@ Yankees	7 – 1	Wang (13–5)	Pérez (6–10)		54,246	48–60
109	August 4	@ Yankees	16 – 8	Myers (1–0)	Bale (0–1)		54,056	48–61
110	August 5	@ Yankees	8 – 5	Mussina (7-7)	Meche (7–9)	Rivera (17)	54,525	48–62
111	August 7	Twins	5 – 1	Bannister (8–6)	Bonser (5–8)		15,648	49–62
112	August 8	Twins	11 – 4	Santana (12–9)	Pérez (6–11)		21,503	49–63
113	August 9	Twins	1 – 0	Davies (5–8)	Garza (1–3)	Soria (12)	14,569	50–63
114	August 10	Blue Jays	2 – 1	Marcum (9–4)	Meche (7–10)	Accardo (21)	21,276	50–64
115	August 11	Blue Jays	4 – 1	Núñez (2–0)	McGowan (8–6)	Soria (13)	25,934	51–64
116	August 12	Blue Jays	4 – 1	Burnett (6-6)	Bannister (8–7)	Accardo (22)	18,381	51–65
117	August 13	Blue Jays	6 – 2	Pérez (7–11)	Litsch (4–5)		14,845	52–65
118	August 14	@ Rangers	5 – 3	Millwood (8–9)	Davies (5–9)	Wilson (5)	23,906	52–66
119	August 15	@ Rangers	4 – 3	Wood (3–1)	Meche (7–11)	Wilson (6)	24,529	52–67
120	August 16	@ Rangers	6 – 2	Braun (1–0)	Eyre (4–6)		22,674	53–67
121	August 17	@ Athletics	9 – 2	Bannister (9–7)	Meyer (0–1)		18,185	54–67
122	August 18	@ Athletics	7 – 3	Pérez (8–11)	Gaudin (9-9)		24,638	55–67
123	August 19	@ Athletics	6 – 1	DiNardo (8–6)	Davies (5–10)		26,445	55–68
124	August 20	@ White Sox	4 – 3	Thornton (4-4)	Riske (1–3)	Jenks (34)	35,391	55–69
125	August 21	@ White Sox	5 – 2	Vázquez (11–6)	Núñez (2–1)	Jenks (35)	35,309	55–70
126	August 22	@ White Sox	7 – 6	Bannister (10–7)	Contreras (6–16)		31,739	56–70
127	August 24	Indians	2 – 1	Bale (1-1)	Sabathia (14–7)	Soria (14)	25,640	57–70
128	August 25	Indians	9 – 4	Laffey (2–1)	Davies (5–11)		23,167	57–71
129	August 26	Indians	5 – 3 (11)	Betancourt (3–0)	Peralta (1–3)	Borowski (37)	18,268	57–72
130	August 28	Tigers	6 – 3	Bannister (11–7)	Robertson (7–11)		16,193	58–72
131	August 29	Tigers	5 – 0	Braun (2–0)	Miller (5-5)	Riske (4)	11,628	59–72
132	August 30	Tigers	6 – 1	Bonderman (11–7)	Núñez (2-2)		11,196	59–73
133	August 31	@ Twins	9 – 4	Davies (6–11)	Garza (3–5)		15,736	60–73
134	August 31	@ Twins	5 – 0	Baker (8–6)	Meche (7–12)		24,986	60–74

September

#	Date	Opponent	Score	Win	Loss	Save	Attendance	Record
135	September 1	@ Twins	6 – 4	Silva (11–13)	Duckworth (2–4)	Nathan (29)	21,738	60–75
136	September 2	@ Twins	8 – 1	Bannister (12–7)	Bonser (6–12)		26,454	61–75
137	September 3	@ Rangers	8 – 1	Greinke (6–5)	Loe (6–11)		19,214	62–75
138	September 4	@ Rangers	9 – 8	Rheinecker (2–1)	Núñez (2–3)	Wilson (11)	18,892	62–76
139	September 5	@ Rangers	3 – 2	Padilla (5–9)	Davies (6–12)	Benoit (3)	17,232	62–77
140	September 7	Yankees	3 – 2	Farnsworth (2–1)	Musser (0–1)	Rivera (24)	27,462	62–78
141	September 8	Yankees	11 – 5	Pettitte (13–8)	Bannister (12–8)		35,518	62–79
142	September 9	Yankees	6 – 3	Wang (18–6)	Duckworth (2–5)	Rivera (25)	24,910	62–80
143	September 10	Twins	4 – 2	Bonser (7–12)	Buckner (0–1)	Nathan (31)	10,525	62–81
144	September 11	Twins	6 – 3	Baker (9–7)	Davies (6–13)	Nathan (32)	12,891	62–82
145	September 12	Twins	6 – 3	Meche (8–12)	Silva (11–14)		10,102	63–82
146	September 14	@ Indians	5 – 4	Borowski (4–5)	Riske (1–4)		35,230	63–83
147	September 15	@ Indians	6 – 0	Carmona (17–8)	Greinke (6-6)		32,113	63–84
148	September 16	@ Indians	4 – 3	Buckner (1-1)	Laffey (3–2)	Soria (15)	30,112	64–84
149	September 17	White Sox	11 – 3	Vázquez (13–8)	Davies (6–14)		14,421	64–85
150	September 18	White Sox	3 – 2	Meche (9–12)	Floyd (1–4)	Soria (16)	15,015	65–85
151	September 19	White Sox	7 – 0	Contreras (10–16)	Bannister (12–9)		11,857	65–86
152	September 20	White Sox	3 – 0	Greinke (7–6)	Garland (9–13)	Soria (17)	10,264	66–86
153	September 21	@ Tigers	5 – 4	Byrdak (2–0)	Núñez (2–4)	Jones (38)	40,117	66–87
154	September 22	@ Tigers	7 – 4	Davies (7–14)	Rogers (3-3)		41,792	67–87
155	September 23	@ Tigers	7 – 2	Verlander (18–6)	de la Rosa (8–12)		40,068	67–88
156	September 24	@ Orioles	3 – 2	Walker (3–2)	Meche (9–13)	Bradford (2)	15,769	67–89
157	September 25	@ White Sox	9 – 5	Duckworth (3–5)	Wassermann (0–1)		31,607	68–89
158	September 26	@ White Sox	3 – 0	Garland (10–13)	Greinke (7-7)		32,091	68–90
159	September 27	@ White Sox	10 – 0	Broadway (1-1)	Buckner (1–2)		34,477	68–91
160	September 28	Indians	5 – 3	Sabathia (19–7)	Davies (7–15)	Borowski (44)	29,846	68–92
161	September 29	Indians	4 – 3	Soria (2–3)	Pérez (1–2)		24,274	69–92
162	September 30	Indians	4 – 2	Laffey (4–2)	Hochevar (0–1)	Borowski (45)	19,104	69–93

== Statistical team leaders ==
=== Batting ===
Stat	Player	Total
Avg.	Mark Teahen	.285
HR	John Buck	18
RBI	Emil Brown	62
R	David DeJesus	101
H	David DeJesus	157
SB	Alex Gordon	14

=== Pitching ===
Stat	Player	Total
W	Brian Bannister	12
L	Gil Meche	13
ERA	Gil Meche	3.67
SO	Gil Meche	156
SV	Joakim Soria	17
IP	Gil Meche	216

Stats as of September 30, 2007

== Royals among league leaders ==
=== Batting ===
Stat	Player	Total	AL Rank	MLB Rank
R	David DeJesus	101	13	26
3B	David DeJesus	9	2 (tie)	5 (tie)
G	David DeJesus	157	16 (tie)	30 (tie)

=== Pitching ===
Stat	Player	Total	AL Rank	MLB Rank
ERA	Gil Meche	3.67	14	24
IP	Gil Meche	216	8	13
G	Jimmy Gobble	74	5	25

Stats as of September 30, 2007

== Player stats ==
=== Batting ===
Note: G = Games played; AB = At bats; R = Runs; H = Hits; 2B = Doubles; 3B = Triples; HR = Home runs; RBI = Runs batted in; SB = Stolen bases; BB = Walks; AVG = Batting average; SLG = Slugging average

Player	G	AB	R	H	2B	3B	HR	RBI	SB	BB	AVG	SLG
David DeJesus	157	605	101	157	29	9	7	58	10	64	.260	.372
Mark Teahen	144	544	78	155	31	8	7	60	13	55	.285	.410
Alex Gordon	151	543	60	134	36	4	15	60	14	41	.247	.411
Tony Peña Jr.	152	509	58	136	25	7	2	47	5	10	.267	.356
Mark Grudzielanek	116	453	70	137	32	3	6	51	1	23	.302	.426
Emil Brown	113	366	44	94	13	1	6	62	12	24	.257	.347
Esteban Germán	121	348	49	92	15	6	4	37	11	43	.264	.376
John Buck	113	347	41	77	18	0	18	48	0	36	.222	.429
Billy Butler	92	329	38	96	23	2	8	52	0	27	.292	.447
Ross Gload	102	320	37	92	22	3	7	51	2	16	.288	.441
Mike Sweeney	74	265	26	69	15	1	7	38	0	17	.260	.404
Joey Gathright	74	228	28	70	8	0	0	19	9	20	.307	.342
Ryan Shealy	52	172	18	38	6	0	3	21	0	13	.221	.308
Jason LaRue	66	169	14	25	9	0	4	13	1	17	.148	.272
Shane Costa	55	103	13	23	6	1	0	12	0	5	.223	.301
Jason Smith	40	85	9	16	2	1	6	14	0	3	.188	.447
Reggie Sanders	24	73	12	23	7	0	2	11	0	11	.315	.493
Fernando Cortez	8	14	3	4	1	0	0	1	0	1	.286	.357
Paul Phillips	8	14	2	2	1	0	0	2	0	1	.143	.214
Ángel Berroa	9	11	0	1	0	0	0	1	0	0	.091	.091
Justin Huber	8	10	2	1	0	0	0	0	0	0	.100	.100
Craig Brazell	5	4	1	1	0	0	0	0	0	1	.250	.250
Pitcher totals	162	22	2	4	1	0	0	2	0	0	.182	.227
Team totals	162	5534	706	1447	300	46	102	660	78	428	.261	.388

=== Pitching ===
Note: W = Wins; L = Losses; ERA = Earned run average; G = Games pitched; GS = Games started; SV = Saves; IP = Innings pitched; H = Hits allowed; R = Runs allowed; ER = Earned runs allowed; BB = Walks allowed; SO = Strikeouts

Player	W	L	ERA	G	GS	SV	IP	H	R	ER	BB	SO
Gil Meche	9	13	3.67	34	34	0	216.0	218	98	88	62	156
Brian Bannister	12	9	3.87	27	27	0	165.0	156	76	71	44	77
Odalis Pérez	8	11	5.57	26	26	0	137.1	178	90	85	50	64
Jorge De La Rosa	8	12	5.82	26	23	0	130.0	160	88	84	53	82
Zack Greinke	7	7	3.69	52	14	1	122.0	122	52	50	36	106
Joel Peralta	1	3	3.80	62	0	1	87.2	93	39	37	19	66
David Riske	1	4	2.45	65	0	4	69.2	61	19	19	27	52
Joakim Soria	2	3	2.48	62	0	17	69.0	46	20	19	19	75
Jimmy Gobble	4	1	3.02	74	0	1	53.2	56	23	18	23	50
Kyle Davies	3	7	6.66	11	11	0	50.0	63	41	37	26	40
Brandon Duckworth	3	5	4.63	26	3	1	46.2	51	30	24	23	21
Juan Carlos Oviedo	2	4	3.92	13	6	0	43.2	44	21	19	10	37
John Bale	1	1	4.05	26	0	0	40.0	45	18	18	17	42
Ryan Braun	2	0	6.64	26	0	0	39.1	46	32	29	22	24
Scott Elarton	2	4	10.46	9	9	0	37.0	53	44	43	21	13
Billy Buckner	1	2	5.29	7	5	0	34.0	37	20	20	16	17
Neal Musser	0	1	4.38	17	0	0	24.2	32	13	12	14	19
Octavio Dotel	2	1	3.91	24	0	11	23.0	24	11	10	11	29
Todd Wellemeyer	0	1	10.34	12	0	0	15.2	25	19	18	11	9
Luke Hochevar	0	1	2.13	4	1	0	12.2	11	4	3	4	5
John Thomson	1	1	3.38	2	2	0	10.2	13	5	4	3	3
Jason Standridge	0	1	8.22	4	0	0	7.2	11	10	7	5	6
Luke Hudson	0	1	18.00	1	1	0	2.0	2	5	4	4	0
Team totals	69	93	4.48	162	162	36	1437.1	1547	778	716	520	993

== Awards and honors ==
- Mike Sweeney, Hutch Award

2007 Major League Baseball All-Star Game

- Gil Meche, pitcher, reserve

== Farm system ==
Level	Team	League	Manager
AAA	Omaha Royals	Pacific Coast League	Mike Jirschele
AA	Wichita Wranglers	Texas League	Tony Tijerina
A	Wilmington Blue Rocks	Carolina League	John Mizerock
A	Burlington Bees	Midwest League	Jim Gabella
Rookie	Burlington Royals	Appalachian League	Darryl Kennedy
Rookie	AZL Royals	Arizona League	Lloyd Simmons
Rookie	Idaho Falls Chukars	Pioneer League	Brian Rupp
