= Royals Sports Television Network =

Defunct regional sports network

The Royals Sports Television Network (RSTN) was a regional sports network serving the Kansas City area, Kansas, western Missouri, Nebraska, Oklahoma, and Iowa owned by the Kansas City Royals. The network began operations before the 2003 Major League Baseball season in response to Fox Sports Midwest's decision to reduce the number of Royals games it broadcast. RSTN had trouble getting widespread carriage by cable systems in the area and had no satellite carriage. However, the Royals began the season with good form and RSTN was able to make a deal with Fox Sports Midwest in June to redistribute most of their broadcasts. RSTN ceased operations after the 2007 season, with the Royals moving to the new channel Fox Sports Kansas City in 2008.

The Royals Insider weekly magazine show won a Regional Emmy Award in 2005 for Best Sports Program.
