= FanDuel Sports Network Kansas City =

Regional sports network in Kansas City

- Type: Regional sports network
- Country: United States
- Broadcast area: Kansas City metropolitan area Kansas; Nationwide (via DirecTV; games only)
- Network: FanDuel Sports Network
- Headquarters: St. Louis, Missouri

Programming
- Language: English
- Picture format: 720p (HDTV); 480i (SDTV)

Ownership
- Owner: Main Street Sports Group
- Sister channels: FanDuel Sports Network Midwest; FanDuel Sports Network Indiana

History
- Launched: March 31, 2008; 18 years ago
- Replaced: Fox Sports Midwest (within designated broadcast area)
- Closed: September 30, 2026 (45 days ago)
- Former names: Fox Sports Kansas City (2008–2021); Bally Sports Kansas City (2021–2024)

Links
- Website: www.fanduelsportsnetwork.com

Availability (some events may air on overflow feed Bally Sports Midwest Extra due to event conflicts)

Streaming media
- FanDuel Sports Network app: www.fanduelsportsnetwork.com (U.S. cable internet subscribers only; requires login from participating providers to stream content; some events may not be available due to league rights restrictions)
- DirecTV Stream: Internet Protocol television
- FuboTV: Internet Protocol television

FanDuel Sports Network Kansas City was an American regional sports network owned by Main Street Sports Group (formerly Diamond Sports Group), and operates as an affiliate of FanDuel Sports Network. The channel broadcasts coverage of professional, collegiate, and high school sports events both within and outside the Kansas City area. It maintains offices at Kauffman Stadium in Kansas City, Missouri.

FanDuel Sports Network Kansas City was available on cable providers throughout western and central Missouri, Kansas, eastern Nebraska, and Iowa; it was also available nationwide on satellite via DirecTV.

== History ==
Fox Sports Kansas City logo, used from 2008 to 2012.

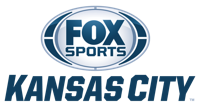
Former Fox Sports Kansas City logo, used from 2012 to 2021

Originally operating as a subfeed of Fox Sports Rocky Mountain, then Fox Sports Midwest in 1998, the network formally announced that it would spin-off Fox Sports Kansas City as a separate channel on January 24, 2008, after Fox Sports Midwest signed an exclusive long-term broadcast agreement with the Kansas City Royals. The agreement was struck following the dissolution of the Royals Sports Television Network, a regional network formed in 2003 to broadcast games and analysis programs for the Major League Baseball franchise, which distributed its event telecasts to broadcast and cable affiliates throughout the Midwestern and South Central United States. Specifically, Fox Sports Kansas City was created to avoid scheduling conflicts with coverage of St. Louis Cardinals games televised by Fox Sports Midwest.

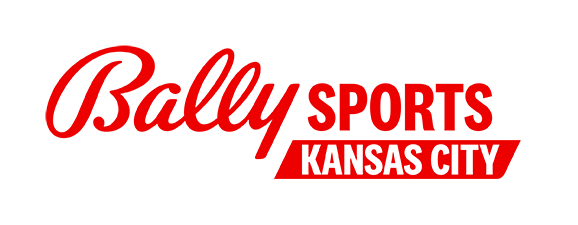
Former Bally Sports Kansas City logo, used from 2021 to 2024.

On December 14, 2017, as part of a merger between both companies, The Walt Disney Company announced plans to acquire all 22 regional Fox Sports networks from 21st Century Fox, including Fox Sports Kansas City. However, on June 27, 2018, the Justice Department ordered their divestment under antitrust grounds, citing Disney's ownership of ESPN. On May 3, 2019, Sinclair Broadcast Group and Entertainment Studios (through their joint venture, Diamond Holdings) bought Fox Sports Networks from The Walt Disney Company for $10.6 billion. The deal closed on August 22, 2019. On November 17, 2020, Sinclair announced an agreement with casino operator Bally's Corporation to serve as a new naming rights partner for the FSN channels. Sinclair announced the new Bally Sports branding for the channels on January 27, 2021. On March 31, 2021, coinciding with the start of the 2021 Major League Baseball season, Fox Sports Kansas City rebranded as Bally Sports Kansas City, resulting in 18 other Regional Sports Networks renamed Bally Sports in their respective regions.

On March 14, 2023, Diamond Sports filed for Chapter 11 Bankruptcy.

On October 16, 2024, it was revealed in a court filing that Diamond had reached a new sponsorship agreement with FanDuel Group, under which it intended to rebrand Bally Sports as the FanDuel Sports Network; on October 18, 2024, Diamond officially announced the rebranding, which took effect October 21. Under the agreement, FanDuel has the option to take a minority equity stake of up to 5% once Diamond Sports exits bankruptcy. The branding is downplayed during programming related to high school sports.

On February 2, 2026, the Kansas City Royals terminated their agreement with Main Street Sports Group, with future games now being produced and distributed by MLB Local Media.

== Programming ==
FanDuel Sports Network Kansas City previously held the exclusive regional cable television rights to the Kansas City Royals, and produced the Major League Baseball team's pre-game and post-game show Royals Live and the weekly magazine program Royals Insider. From 2017 to 2021, the channel held the exclusive regional television rights to Sporting Kansas City broadcasts. Because at the time there was Royals and SKC programming at the same time, FanDuel Sports Network Kansas City is provided to cable operators as two separate channels, which normally carry identical programming.

During the college football season, the channel broadcasts Kansas Jayhawks and Kansas State Wildcats games in different time slots to avoid scheduling conflicts; the channel also broadcasts Kansas State Wildcats basketball and volleyball and baseball from the Wildcats and Kansas Jayhawks.

The channel also carries select events televised by FanDuel Sports Network Midwest including games from the St. Louis Blues (NHL); basketball, volleyball, baseball and wrestling events from the Missouri Tigers, with the university's college football games televised on an alternate feed. The Blues games are only shown within the Kansas City metropolitan area, as a separate feed exists for the rest of Kansas since it is part of the Colorado Avalanche's territory.

Other sports programming on the network includes Big 12 Conference regular season women's basketball and baseball games, and championship matches from both conference-sanctioned sports; regular season and championship basketball games from the Missouri Valley Conference; college coaches' shows; football and basketball championships from the Missouri State High School Activities Association; and NBA games from the Oklahoma City Thunder televised by FanDuel Sports Network Oklahoma. In addition select Minnesota Timberwolves (produced by FanDuel Sports Network North) are shown outside of the Kansas City metropolitan area.

Region served	MLB	NBA		NHL
Region served	Kansas City Royals (before 2026)	Minnesota Timberwolves (FanDuel Sports Network North)	Oklahoma City Thunder (FanDuel Sports Network Oklahoma)	St. Louis Blues (FanDuel Sports Network Midwest)
Kansas City, St. Joseph, Lawrence	Yes	No	Yes	Yes
Rest of Kansas	Yes	Yes	Yes	No

== Former on-air staff ==
=== Sporting Kansas City ===
- Nate Bukaty - play-by-play commentary
- Jacob Peterson - color analyst
- Carter Augustine - sideline reporter

=== Kansas City Royals ===
- Ryan Lefebvre – play-by-play commentary
- Jake Eisenberg – fill in play-by-play commentary
- Rex Hudler – analyst
- Jeff Montgomery – analyst
- Joel Goldberg – in game reporter
- Mike Sweeney - Fill in studio analyst
- Jeremy Guthrie - Fill in studio analyst
