= FanDuel Sports Network Midwest =

American regional sports network

- Type: Regional sports network
- Country: United States
- Broadcast area: Eastern and Central Missouri; Western, Central and Southern Illinois; Iowa; Nebraska; Nationwide (via satellite)
- Network: FanDuel Sports Network
- Headquarters: St. Louis, Missouri

Programming
- Language: English
- Picture format: 720p (HDTV); 480i (SDTV)

Ownership
- Owner: Main Street Sports Group (70%); St. Louis Cardinals (30%)
- Sister channels: FanDuel Sports Network Indiana; FanDuel Sports Network Kansas City

History
- Launched: November 1989 (36 years ago)
- Closed: September 30, 2026 (6 days ago)
- Former names: Prime Sports Midwest (1989–1996); Fox Sports Midwest (1996–1999; 2008–2021); Fox Sports Net Midwest (1999–2004); FSN Midwest (2004–2008); Bally Sports Midwest (2021-2024)

Links
- Website: www.fanduelsportsnetwork.com

FanDuel Sports Network Midwest was an American regional sports network owned by Main Street Sports Group (formerly Diamond Sports Group) operated as an affiliate of FanDuel Sports Network. The channel broadcast regional event coverage of sports teams throughout the Midwestern United States, most prominently, professional sports teams based in St. Louis, Missouri.

FanDuel Sports Network Midwest was available on cable providers throughout eastern and central Missouri, Western and Southern Illinois, Nebraska, and Iowa; it was also available nationwide on satellite via DirecTV.

== History ==
Fox Sports Midwest logo, used from 2008 to 2012.

The channel originally launched by TCI and Bill Daniels in November 1989 as Prime Sports Network Midwest (also referred to as Prime Sports Midwest), serving as an affiliate of the Prime Network. The network was originally based in Indianapolis and held rights to 25 home games of the Indiana Pacers. Originally seen mainly within Indiana, the channel began expanding its cable provider coverage westward in 1994. Following Liberty Media's sale of the Prime Network to News Corporation, the channel became a member of the newly formed Fox Sports Net (then a joint venture between Liberty Media and News Corporation) and rebranded as Fox Sports Midwest (FSMW) on November 1, 1996. The channel was then rebranded as Fox Sports Net Midwest in 1999, as part of a collective brand modification of the FSN networks under the "Fox Sports Net" banner; subsequently in 2004, the channel shortened its name to FSN Midwest, through the networks' de-emphasis of the brand.

In the spring of 2006, Fox Sports Midwest obtained the exclusive regional cable television rights to broadcast NBA games involving the Indiana Pacers. This resulted in the channel creating a spin-off regional sports network channel, Fox Sports Indiana, for the primary purpose of airing games from the Pacers and the WNBA's Indiana Fever; Fox Sports Indiana launched on November 1, 2006, at the start of the team's regular season.

In the fall of 2007, Fox Sports Midwest signed an exclusive long-term agreement to broadcast games from the Kansas City Royals (this followed the team's decision to dissolve the Royals Sports Television Network, a regional television syndication service for the team's game broadcasts). On January 24, 2008, the network formally announced that it would spin off its subfeed for the Kansas City market into a separate channel, Fox Sports Kansas City, to avoid scheduling conflicts with Fox Sports Midwest's St. Louis Cardinals game coverage. The main St. Louis-based feed reverted to the Fox Sports Midwest moniker that same year.

Former Fox Sports Midwest logo, used from 2012 to 2021

On July 15, 2010, Fox Sports Midwest signed a new television contract with the St. Louis Cardinals, giving the channel exclusive regional broadcast rights to the team's games beginning with the 2011 season, ending the team's local broadcasts in the St. Louis market on NBC affiliate KSDK (channel 5).

On July 30, 2015, Fox Sports Midwest and the St. Louis Cardinals agreed to a long-term television rights agreement. The new agreement began in 2018 and will run 15 seasons through the 2032 season. The deal will guarantee the St. Louis Cardinals more than $1 billion, including a 30% equity stake in the network.

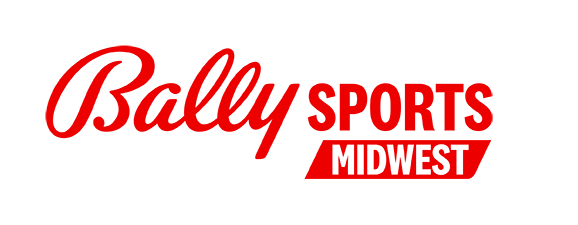
Former logo as Bally Sports Midwest, used from 2021 to 2024

On December 14, 2017, as part of a merger between both companies, The Walt Disney Company announced plans to acquire all 22 regional Fox Sports networks from 21st Century Fox, including Fox Sports Midwest. However, on June 27, 2018, the Justice Department ordered their divestment under antitrust grounds, citing Disney's ownership of ESPN. On May 3, 2019, Sinclair Broadcast Group and Entertainment Studios (through their joint venture, Diamond Holdings) bought Fox Sports Networks from The Walt Disney Company for $10.6 billion. The deal closed on August 22, 2019. On November 17, 2020, Sinclair announced an agreement with casino operator Bally's Corporation to serve as a new naming rights partner for the FSN channels. Sinclair announced the new Bally Sports branding for the channels on January 27, 2021. On March 31, 2021, coinciding with the 2021 Major League Baseball season, Fox Sports Midwest was rebranded as Bally Sports Midwest, resulting in 18 other Regional Sports Networks renamed Bally Sports in their respective regions.

On March 14, 2023, Diamond Sports filed for Chapter 11 Bankruptcy.

On October 16, 2024, it was revealed in a court filing that Diamond had reached a new sponsorship agreement with FanDuel Group, under which it intended to rebrand Bally Sports as the FanDuel Sports Network; on October 18, 2024, Diamond officially announced the rebranding, which took effect October 21. Under the agreement, FanDuel has the option to take a minority equity stake of up to 5% once Diamond Sports exits bankruptcy. The branding is downplayed during programming related to high school sports.

== Programming ==
FanDuel Sports Network Midwest holds the exclusive regional cable television rights to the NHL games from the St. Louis Blues. As the St. Louis region is claimed by both the NBA's Indiana Pacers and Memphis Grizzlies, select games from FanDuel Sports Network Indiana and FanDuel Sports Network South are carried, either as repeats, on FanDuel Sports Network Midwest Plus, or on the main channel if a Blues or SLU game is not scheduled that night. The channel also broadcasts college athletics, including men's basketball games from the Missouri Valley Conference and St. Louis Billikens.

=== Regional feeds ===
FanDuel Sports Network Midwest maintains a total of 6 feeds (not including 5 additional feeds for FanDuel Sports Network Indiana and FanDuel Sports Network Kansas City). In addition to Cardinals games before 2026 and Blues games which are available in all regions except Nebraska, select games produced by neighboring FanDuel Sports networks are also carried in some areas. The Kansas City Royals (produced by FanDuel Sports Network Kansas City) are offered in most regions outside of the Cardinals exclusive market area. Since the entire coverage area lacks an NBA team, games from two of the following teams are offered in each region: Indiana Pacers, Memphis Grizzlies, Minnesota Timberwolves, and Oklahoma City Thunder.

Region served	MLB		NBA				NHL
Region served	St. Louis Cardinals (before 2026)	Kansas City Royals (FanDuel Sports Network Kansas City)	Indiana Pacers (FanDuel Sports Network Indiana)	Memphis Grizzlies (FanDuel Sports Network Southeast)	Minnesota Timberwolves (FanDuel Sports Network North)	Oklahoma City Thunder (FanDuel Sports Network Oklahoma)	St. Louis Blues
St. Louis	Yes	No	Yes	Yes	No	No	Yes
Northeast Missouri	Yes	No	No	No	No	No	Yes
Southeast Missouri	Yes	Yes	Yes	Yes	No	No	Yes
Central/Downstate Illinois	Yes	No	Yes	Yes	No	No	Yes
Southwest/Mid-Missouri	Yes	Yes	No	Yes	No	Yes	Yes
Northern Iowa	No	No	No	No	Yes	No	No
Southeastern Iowa	Yes	No	No	No	No	No	Yes
East Central Iowa	Yes	No	No	No	No	No	Yes
South Central Iowa	Yes	No	No	No	No	No	Yes
Central Iowa	Yes	Yes	No	No	Yes	No	Yes
Southwestern Iowa	No	Yes	No	No	Yes	No	Yes
Nebraska	No	Yes	No	No	Yes	Yes	No

=== Former programming ===
Until the creation of the SEC Network in 2014, FanDuel Sports Network Midwest also screened a substantial amount of Missouri Tigers programming, including select football games, basketball, and occasional Olympic sports telecasts. It aired weekly Mizzou magazine shows, as well as football and men's basketball coaches' shows. It also filled a similar role for the Nebraska Cornhuskers until they joined the Big Ten Conference (which too has its own TV channel) in 2012, and like for Mizzou it aired university-produced ancillary programming for the Huskers. Additionally, the network carried SIUE Cougars men’s basketball through the 2017-18 season, Kansas State Wildcats men’s and women’s basketball (simulcasted from sister network Fox Sports Kansas City) through the 2018-19 season, and a limited schedule of Creighton Bluejays men’s basketball games through the 2019-20 season. The Creighton games were aired through a sub-licensing deal with then-sister network Fox Sports 1 in which some games not of national interest are distributed to their regional sports network partners, CBS Sports Network and the ESPN family of networks as part of the "new" Big East's television contract. Syndicated coverage of football and men’s and women’s basketball from the ACC, Big 12, Big East, Big Ten, Conference USA, Pac-12, SEC, and WCC also aired on the network until all of those conferences ultimately discontinued their syndication packages to regional sports networks at various points throughout the past two decades.

On February 2nd, 2026, the St. Louis Cardinals announced their departure from FanDuel Sports Network Midwest. The Cardinals will also launch Cardinals.TV, with the MLB producing future games starting in 2026.

== Other services ==
=== FanDuel Sports Network Midwest Extra ===
FanDuel Sports Network Extra is an overflow feed of FanDuel Sports Network Midwest that was launched in October 2011 as Fox Sports Midwest Plus. FanDuel Sports Network Kansas City and FanDuel Sports Network Indiana also operate their own FanDuel Sports Network Extra overflow feeds to resolve scheduling conflicts with FanDuel Sports Network Midwest-televised events that are simulcast on the two channels.

=== St. Louis Cardinals outside of FanDuel Sports Network Midwest broadcast area prior to 2026 ===
The St. Louis Cardinals have one of the largest geographic territories for an MLB team, with includes all or part of 10 states and partially overlaps the territories of 9 other teams. As a result, FanDuel Sports Network provides Cardinals games to neighboring FDSN networks (in addition to FanDuel Sports Network Indiana and Kansas City) in areas where FanDuel Sports Network Midwest is not carried, prior to the 2026 MLB season. Most games appear on FanDuel Sports Network South or FanDuel Sports Network Southeast in parts of western Kentucky, western Tennessee, and northern Mississippi, with the remaining games available on an alternate channel. In Arkansas and Oklahoma games are broadcast on FanDuel Sports Network Southwest Extra/Bally Sports Oklahoma Extra.

== Notable on-air staff ==
=== Former ===
==== St. Louis Blues ====
- Chris Kerber – play-by-play announcer
- Joey Vitale – color analyst
- Andy Strickland – Blues LIVE studio host (road) and rinkside reporter
- Scott Warmann – Blues LIVE studio host (home)
- Bernie Federko – Blues LIVE studio analyst
- Chris Pronger – Blues LIVE studio analyst
- Jamie Rivers – Blues LIVE studio analyst

==== College sports ====
- Scott Warmann – Saint Louis Billikens men's basketball play-by-play announcer
- Scott Highmark – Saint Louis Billikens men's basketball color analyst
- Joe Pott – SIU Edwardsville Cougars men's basketball color analyst
- Mitch Holthus – Missouri Valley Conference men's basketball play-by-play announcer
- Rich Zvosec – Missouri Valley Conference men's basketball color analyst
- Joe Buck – St. Louis Cardinals play-by-play (now with ESPN)
- Quinn Buckner – Indiana Pacers analyst (now with FanDuel Sports Network Indiana)
- Jim Edmonds – St. Louis Cardinals color analyst
- Clark Kellogg – Indiana Pacers analyst (now with CBS Sports and FanDuel Sports Network Indiana)
- John Kelly – St. Louis Blues play-by-play
- Ryan Lefebvre – Royals play-by-play (now with FanDuel Sports Network Kansas City)
- Dan McLaughlin – St. Louis Cardinals baseball and Saint Louis Billikens men's basketball play-by-play announcer
- Darren Pang – St. Louis Blues color analyst (now with the Chicago Sports Network)
- Pat Parris – Blues LIVE host, Cardinals LIVE host, Saint Louis Billikens and SIUE Cougars men's basketball play-by-play (now with KGUN-TV)
- Eric Piatkowski – Nebraska Cornhuskers basketball analyst (now with Big Ten Network)
- Jon Sundvold – Missouri Tigers basketball analyst (now with ESPN/SEC Network)
- Erica Weston – St. Louis Cardinals field reporter and studio host (now with CBS Sports/CBS Los Angeles)
- Frank White – Kansas City Royals analyst (now with FanDuel Sports Network Kansas City)

==== St. Louis Cardinals ====
- Chip Caray – play-by-play announcer
- Tom Ackerman – fill-in play-by-play announcer
- Brad Thompson – color analyst
- Jim Hayes – Cardinals LIVE studio host and field reporter
- Scott Warmann – Cardinals LIVE studio host and field reporter
- Alexa Datt – Cardinals LIVE studio host and field reporter
- Mark Sweeney – Cardinals LIVE studio analyst
- Tom Pagnozzi – Cardinals LIVE studio analyst
- Ricky Horton – Cardinals LIVE studio analyst
- Al Hrabosky – Cardinals LIVE studio analyst
