= Brian Bannister =

American baseball player (born 1981)

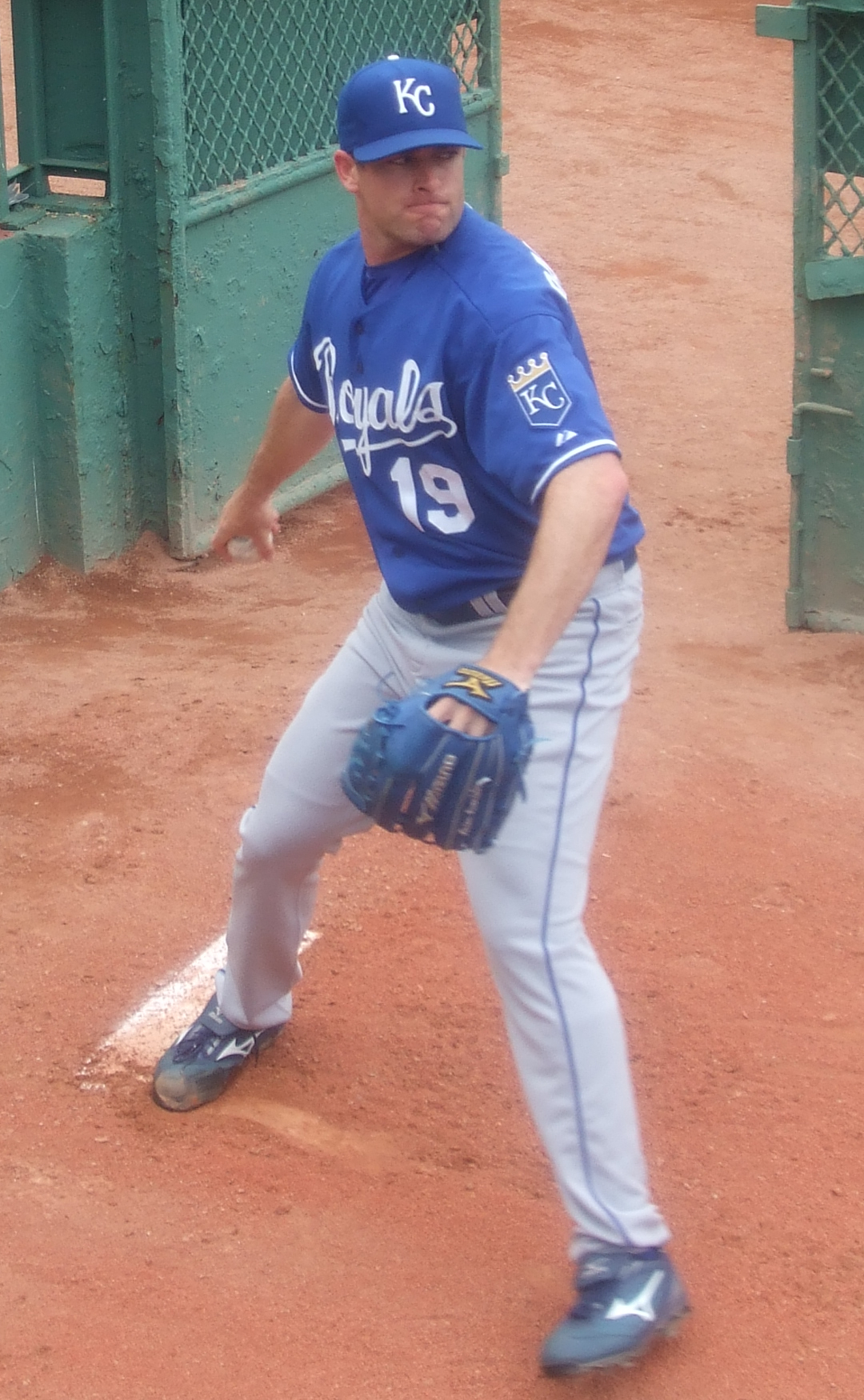
- Bannister with the Kansas City Royals

Chicago White Sox
- Pitcher / Director of Pitching
- Born: February 28, 1981 (age 44); Scottsdale, Arizona, U.S.
- Batted: Right Threw: Right

MLB debut
- April 5, 2006, for the New York Mets

Last MLB appearance
- September 10, 2010, for the Kansas City Royals

MLB statistics
- Win–loss record: 37–50
- Earned run average: 5.08
- Strikeouts: 384
- Stats at Baseball Reference

Teams
- As player: New York Mets (2006); Kansas City Royals (2007–2010); As coach: Boston Red Sox (2016–2019); San Francisco Giants (2020–2023)

Career highlights and awards
- World Series champion (2018)

Brian Patrick Bannister (born February 28, 1981) is an American director of pitching for the Chicago White Sox. He is a former professional baseball starting pitcher who played for the New York Mets and Kansas City Royals of Major League Baseball (MLB) from 2006 through 2010. He played college baseball as a walk-on for the University of Southern California. Bannister was selected by the Mets in the seventh round of the 2003 Major League Baseball draft. He previously served as assistant pitching coach and vice president of pitching development for the Boston Red Sox.

== Amateur career ==
Bannister was born in Scottsdale, Arizona. He had a remarkable high school career at Chaparral High School, former home of Chicago White Sox star Paul Konerko, as he was named All-Region and All-City in 1997, 1998 and 1999. Chaparral was the runner-up to the state title in 1997 and 1998, but in Bannister's senior year, he helped take home the state championship by striking out seven of the nine batters he faced in the championship game.

Bannister began his college career as a walk-on at the University of Southern California. Entering as a second baseman, he became a full-time pitcher before the start of his freshman season. He posted an ERA of 4.35 in 10 games out of the bullpen in his freshman year. Acting as the team closer during his 2001 sophomore campaign, he compiled a 2.80 ERA and five saves in 34 relief appearances. Bannister helped the Trojans to the College World Series in both 2000 and 2001 while pitching alongside fellow future major leaguers Mark Prior and Anthony Reyes. After the 2001 season, he played collegiate summer baseball with the Brewster Whitecaps of the Cape Cod Baseball League. He redshirted in 2002, due to arthroscopic elbow surgery to remove impinged scar tissue in his elbow.

Bannister was drafted by the Boston Red Sox in the 45th round (1,342nd overall) of the 2002 Major League Baseball draft, but did not sign. He returned to the Trojans in 2003 to play his junior year, which was also his first year as a starter. In 18 games (14 starts), Bannister compiled a 6–5 record with an ERA of 4.53.

== Professional career ==
=== Minor leagues ===
Bannister was drafted by the New York Mets in the seventh round (199th overall) of the 2003 Major League Baseball draft. He signed with the team, agreeing to a signing bonus of $95,000, and was assigned to the Single-A Brooklyn Cyclones. There, he put together a strong season, posting a 4–1 record with one save and an ERA of 2.15 in 12 games (nine starts) and was named a New York–Penn League Postseason All-Star.

In 2004, Bannister was assigned to play for the High-A St. Lucie Mets in the Florida State League, where he put together a 5–7 record with a 4.24 ERA in 20 starts and was a Florida State League All-Star. His experimentation with throwing a two-seam fastball and circle changeup led to this decline in numbers, but prepared him for the competition at higher levels of professional baseball. Bannister was then promoted to the Double-A Binghamton Mets following the trade of Scott Kazmir to the Tampa Bay Devil Rays, where he had a 3–3 record and an ERA of 4.08 in eight starts. After the 2004 season, Bannister played for the Peoria Saguaros of the Arizona Fall League. He posted strong numbers, going 2–0 with a 3.77 ERA against the top prospects in the minor leagues. More importantly, he developed his cut fastball while in the AFL, which would develop into one of his strongest pitches.

The next year, Bannister began the 2005 season in Double-A Binghamton, where he posted numbers that reflected the quality of his newly developed pitches: a 9–4 record with a 2.56 ERA in 18 starts. This earned him an All-Star selection for the third consecutive season, and the honor of starting pitcher for the Double-A All-Star Game. This display caused Bannister to earn a promotion to Triple-A Norfolk Tides, where he showed further promise against better competition. He finished with a 4–1 record and an ERA of 3.18 in eight starts with the Tides.

=== New York Mets ===
==== 2006 ====
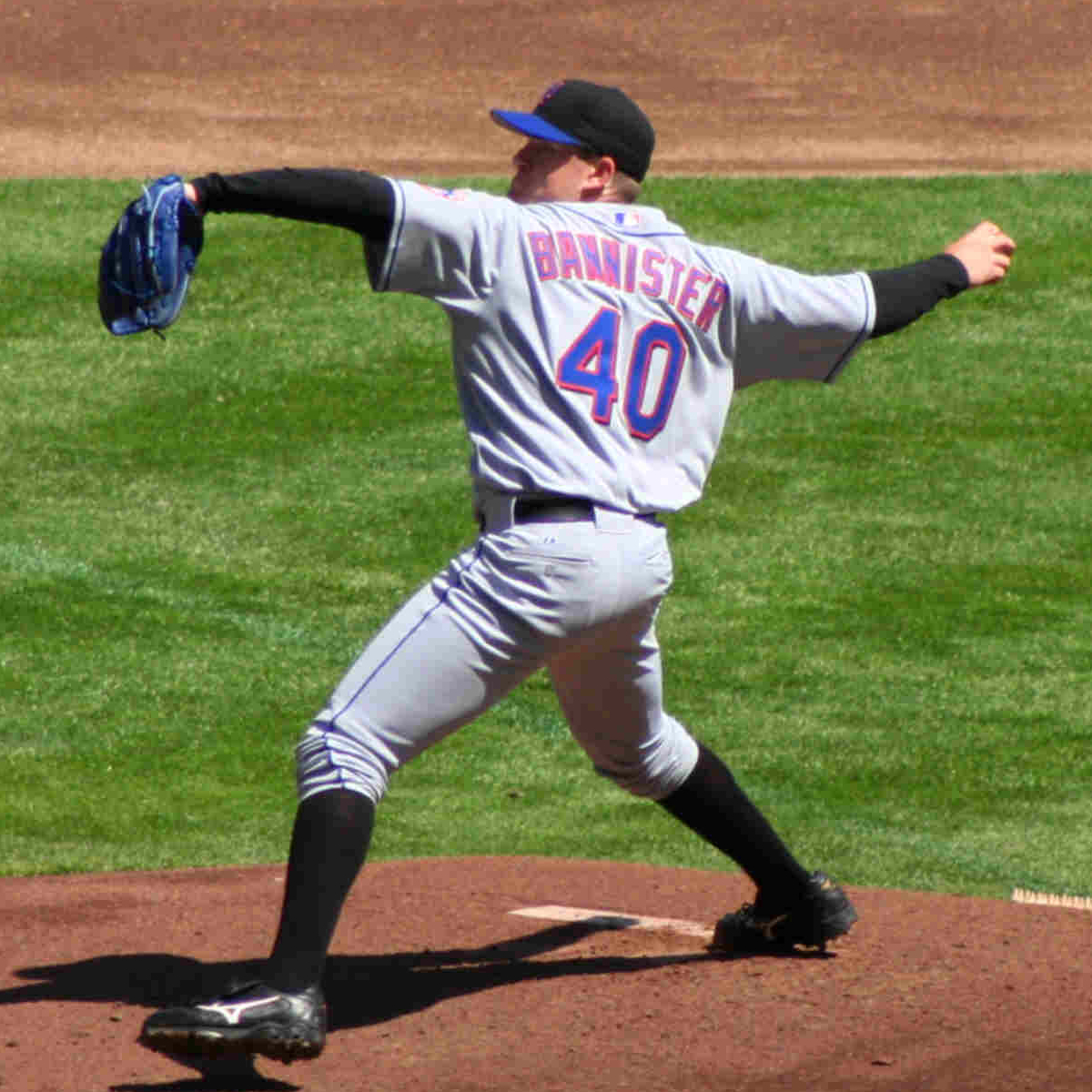
Bannister pitching for the New York Mets in 2006

At 25 years old, Bannister was named a member of the Mets' starting rotation to begin the 2006 season. He made his Major League debut against the Washington Nationals on April 5, and took a no-hitter into the sixth inning. Bannister ultimately allowed three earned runs, two hits and four walks in six innings of work, earning a no decision. His first major league win came in his second start, also against Washington, on April 11, 2006. A former second baseman, Bannister also excelled at the plate, acquiring four hits in his first ten at-bats, including three doubles and two RBI.

After making five starts, Bannister was put on the 15-day disabled list with a strained right hamstring, which he injured while running the bases in the fifth inning of an April 26 game against the San Francisco Giants. At the time of his injury, Bannister had made five starts for the Mets, posting a record of 2–0 with a 2.89 ERA.

Bannister spent a month on a Minor League rehab assignment, pitching for the St. Lucie Mets and the Norfolk Tides. When Orlando Hernández was unable to pitch in late August, Bannister made a spot start against the Philadelphia Phillies, giving up four runs in six innings in a 4–3 loss. The game was Bannister's first major league defeat. Immediately after the game, Bannister was optioned to Triple-A Norfolk to allow Óliver Pérez to make a spot start the following day. Bannister returned to the Mets for the month of September and made two relief appearances. He finished the season with a 2–1 record and a 4.26 ERA in eight games (six starts).

On September 6, 2006, the Brooklyn Cyclones honored Bannister with his own bobblehead and retired his number, 19. Bannister was the first pitcher from the Cyclones to make his Major League debut with the Mets.

Because his hamstring injury reduced the number of innings pitched in 2006, Bannister joined the Tomateros de Culiacán in the Mexican Pacific League. He won in his debut, pitching five innings against the Algodoneros de Guasave. After completing the first half of the season with the Tomateros, Bannister returned home with a 3–2 record and a 3.68 ERA in six starts.

=== Kansas City Royals ===
==== 2007 ====
On December 5, 2006, during the MLB Winter Meetings, Bannister was traded from the New York Mets to the Kansas City Royals for relief pitcher Ambiorix Burgos.

In spring 2007, Bannister's high school jersey number, 15, was retired alongside former Chaparral High School players Darryl Deak, Brian Deak, coach Mark Miller, and former Chicago White Sox star Paul Konerko.

On April 24, 2007, Bannister made his debut with the Royals against the Chicago White Sox. He gave up four runs, three of them earned runs, in 4 1/3 innings, and received a no decision.

In June 2007, Bannister was one of two major league pitchers to win five games, going 5–1 with a 2.75 ERA in six starts, including a streak of 18 innings without an earned run, and was named AL Rookie of the Month. He won the award for the second time in August 2007, posting a 4–1 record and a 2.90 ERA in six starts. Bannister also struck out 16 batters while walking nine in 40 1/3 innings for the month.

On August 16, 2007, Bannister threw his first career complete game, a four-hitter against the Oakland Athletics. He threw 111 pitches, 73 for strikes, and retired 21 of the last 22 batters he faced in the 9–2 win.

Bannister finished the season 12–9 with a 3.87 ERA in 27 starts. After the season, he placed third in the 2007 American League Rookie of the Year voting. He received one first place vote, eight second place votes, and seven third place votes. Bannister was also selected to the 2007 Topps Major League Rookie All-Star Team. The selection was the result of the 49th annual Topps balloting of Major League managers.

==== 2008 ====
For the 2008 season, Bannister was named the Royals' number-two starter behind Gil Meche. He regressed from his 2007 form, finishing the season with a record of 9–16 and a 5.76 ERA in 32 starts. He led the majors in grand slams allowed, with four, and tied for second in the AL in losses. On August 17, 2008, against the New York Yankees, Bannister gave up 10 earned runs on 10 hits (three home runs) and three walks while pitching only one complete inning. In this year, his daughter Brynn was born on October 11.

==== 2009 ====
On February 4, 2009, Bannister signed a one-year, $1.7375 million contract with the Royals, avoiding arbitration. On April 1, he was assigned to the Triple-A Omaha Royals to begin the 2009 season. He was called up on April 22 to fill the number-five spot in the rotation, and tossed six shutout innings in his return that day against the Cleveland Indians. After adding a new changeup to his repertoire, his ground ball rate increased and he had a 7–7 record and a 3.59 ERA into early August, ranking in the Top 10 in the American League in ERA and being the subject of numerous trade deadline rumors. Unfortunately, he suffered a season-ending right rotator cuff tear in a 117-pitch game August 2 against Tampa Bay. After attempting to pitch with the injury and losing five consecutive starts, he was placed on the disabled list for the rest of the season in early September. He finished the year compiling a record of 7–12 with a 4.73 ERA in 26 starts.

==== 2010 ====
Bannister spent the winter rehabilitating his shoulder and returned to what would be his last MLB season. On June 23, 2010, Bannister and the Royals handed Washington Nationals phenom Stephen Strasburg his first career loss in a 1–0 victory in Washington. During the season, he struggled with ineffectiveness, giving up home runs and pitching deep into games, and went 7–12 with a 6.34 ERA in 24 games (23 starts).

In 2010, Bannister was chosen as "honorable mention" in a list of the smartest athletes in sports by Sporting News.

=== Yomiuri Giants ===
==== 2011 ====
On January 6, 2011, Bannister signed a one-year contract to play for Japan's Yomiuri Giants. In April, Bannister left the team following the earthquake and tsunami in Northern Japan, stating he had no further plans to play in either Japan or the United States. He currently runs a fund that supports non-profit organizations for families in crisis in the San Francisco Bay Area.

== Post-playing career ==
During his pitching career, Bannister became known in baseball for his interest in scouting and player analysis and evaluation. He became interested in statistical analysis and Sabermetrics such as FIP and UZR as means of determining a player's true value. On January 13, 2015, Bannister joined the Boston Red Sox as a member of its professional scouting department. On September 9, 2015, he was promoted by Red Sox president of baseball operations Dave Dombrowski to a new position, director of pitching analysis and development. On July 6, 2016, Bannister was promoted to assistant pitching coach. On November 3, 2016, he was promoted to vice president of pitching development, in addition to his role as assistant pitching coach. After the 2019 season, he was taken off the coaching staff while remaining as vice president of pitching development, until leaving the Red Sox to become the director of pitching for the San Francisco Giants in December 2019.

In September 2023, Bannister was hired as the senior pitching advisor for the Chicago White Sox under new general manager Chris Getz.

== Photography career ==
Bannister is an avid photographer and photography supporter. He is the founder of a full-service photography studio complex and equipment rental house in Phoenix, Arizona. He graduated cum laude from the University of Southern California with a Bachelor of Arts degree from the School of Fine Arts. His work has been featured in The New York Times, New York Daily News, and American Photo.

== Personal ==
Bannister is married and has one daughter, Brynn, who was born in the 2008 offseason. In 2011, his son Atley was born in December. He is a devout Christian and the oldest son of former Major League All-Star pitcher Floyd Bannister, who pitched from 1977 to 1992 with Houston, Seattle, Chicago (AL), Kansas City, California, and Texas. His uncle, Greg Cochran, also played in the Yankees' and Athletics' minor league systems. His brother Brett spent time as a pitcher in the Mariners' system, and his brother Cory pitched at Stanford. Brian and Brett are both members of Lambda Chi Alpha fraternity.

== See also ==
- List of second-generation Major League Baseball players
