= Ryan Braun (pitcher) =

Canadian baseball pitcher (born 1980)

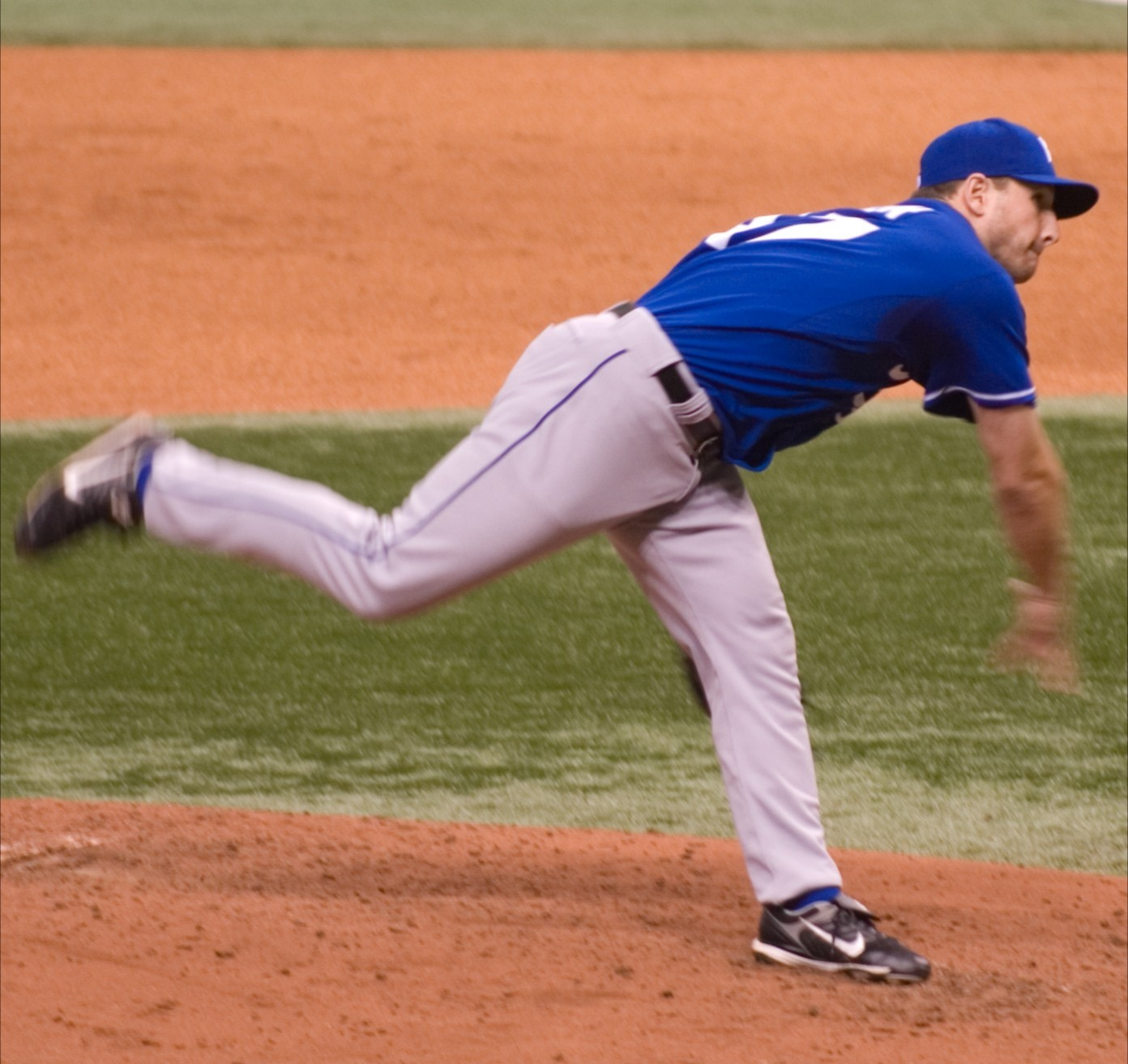
- Braun pitching for the Kansas City Royals in 2007
- Relief pitcher
- Born: July 29, 1980 (age 45); Kitchener, Ontario, Canada
- Batted: Right Threw: Right

MLB debut
- September 2, 2006, for the Kansas City Royals

Last MLB appearance
- September 25, 2007, for the Kansas City Royals

MLB statistics
- Win–loss record: 2–1
- Earned run average: 6.66
- Strikeouts: 30
- Stats at Baseball Reference

Teams
- Kansas City Royals (2006–2007)

Ryan Zachary Braun (born July 29, 1980) is a Canadian former professional baseball pitcher. He played in Major League Baseball (MLB) for the Kansas City Royals. Listed at 6 feet 1 inch (1.85 m) and 215 pounds (98 kg) as a player, he threw and batted right-handed.

== Career ==
Although born in Canada, Braun grew up in Fresno, California, where he attended Edison High School. He played college baseball at Wake Forest University (1999–2002) and the University of Nevada, Las Vegas (2003). In 2000, Braun played collegiate summer baseball with the Chatham A's of the Cape Cod Baseball League, and returned to the league in 2002 to play for the Cotuit Kettleers.

Braun began his professional career in 2003 for the Kansas City Royals organization, playing for the AZL Royals. In 2004, Braun played for the Class A-Advanced Wilmington Blue Rocks. In 2005, Braun split time between the Class A-Advanced High Desert Mavericks and the Double-A Wichita Wranglers. Braun spent most of the 2006 season in Wichita and for the Triple-A Omaha Royals.

Braun made his MLB debut on September 2, 2006. His first major-league strikeout was David Ortiz. He made nine appearances during the 2006 season, and had a 6.75 earned run average (ERA). In 2007, he had a 6.64 ERA. In March 2008, the Royals optioned him to Triple-A Omaha. He then underwent reconstructive elbow surgery, and missed the 2008 season.

Braun signed a minor league contract with an invitation to spring training with the Chicago White Sox on June 23, 2009. In 2009, he played for the Rookie-level Bristol White Sox and Class A Kannapolis Intimidators. Braun was invited to spring training in 2010 but did not make the club; he played for the Triple-A Charlotte Knights the entire season before becoming a free agent on November 6, 2010.

On December 13, 2010, Braun signed a minor-league deal with the Los Angeles Angels. He was invited to spring training for 2011 but did not make the team and was released before the start of the season.

After his release from the Angels, Braun signed with the Lancaster Barnstormers of the Atlantic League of Professional Baseball. He pitched to a 6.00 ERA over three games for the team and became a free agent after the season.
