= Nate Robertson =

American baseball player (born 1977)

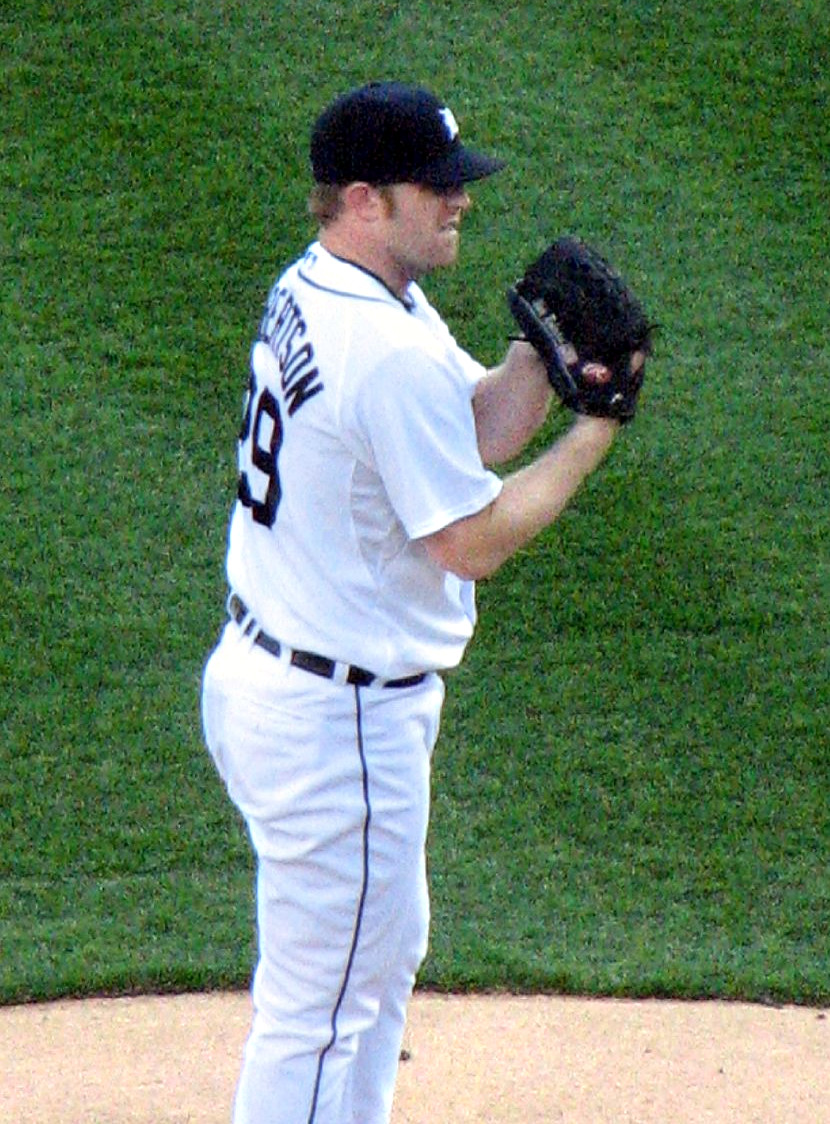
- Robertson with the Detroit Tigers
- Pitcher
- Born: September 3, 1977 (age 48); Wichita, Kansas, U.S.
- Batted: Right Threw: Left

MLB debut
- September 7, 2002, for the Florida Marlins

Last MLB appearance
- September 8, 2010, for the Philadelphia Phillies

MLB statistics
- Win–loss record: 57–77
- Earned run average: 5.01
- Strikeouts: 775
- Stats at Baseball Reference

Teams
- Florida Marlins (2002); Detroit Tigers (2003–2009); Florida Marlins (2010); Philadelphia Phillies (2010)

Nathan Daniel Robertson (born September 3, 1977) is an American former professional baseball pitcher. He played in Major League Baseball for the Florida Marlins, Detroit Tigers and Philadelphia Phillies.

== Career ==
=== Florida Marlins ===
Robertson attended Wichita State University and was drafted by the Florida Marlins in the fifth round of the 1999 Major League Baseball draft. Robertson underwent Tommy John surgery in 1998 while a sophomore at Wichita State. Robertson pitched for the Low-A Utica Blue Sox and Single-A Kane County Cougars; with the latter he was 6–1 with a 2.29 ERA in eight starts. Robertson returned to Kane County for the 2000 season but spent most of the year on the disabled list battling tendinitis in his left elbow. Florida moved him up to the High-A Brevard County Manatees, where he went 11–4 as a starter. Robertson's rise continued in 2002, as Florida promoted him to the Double-A Portland Sea Dogs of the Eastern League. At Portland Robertson amassed a 10–9 record with a 3.42 ERA, sufficient that Florida summoned him to the major league club in early September.

Robertson made his Major League debut on September 7, 2002, for the Marlins, pitching 4 2/3 innings and allowing four earned runs in a 4–1 loss to the Pittsburgh Pirates at PNC Park. Robertson moved to the bullpen for the remainder of the season, making five relief appearances. The following January Florida traded Robertson along with Gary Knotts and Rob Henkel to the Detroit Tigers for Mark Redman and Jerrod Fuell.

=== Detroit Tigers ===
Robertson began the 2003 season with the Toledo Mud Hens, Detroit's Triple-A affiliate. Robertson remained there until late August, when Detroit, recalled him. In his first start with Detroit and second major league start overall, Robertson threw 8 1/3 innings against the Texas Rangers, giving up two earned runs and striking out eight. Robertson did not figure in the decision, as Detroit lost the game 4–2 in sixteen innings. Robertson won his first major league game eleven days later, pitching five innings in an 8–4 victory over the Chicago White Sox.

Robertson's best pitch is his four-seam fastball, followed by a "plus" slider and major-league quality change-up.

In 2005, he began wearing clear corrective lenses to correct his lazy eye.

Robertson invented a new means of rallying the Tigers during a June 2006 game with the New York Yankees. While wearing a microphone for television, Robertson began stuffing his mouth with Big League Chew to encourage the Tigers to score, down 5–0. Iván Rodríguez hit a home run on the subsequent at-bat. Though the Tigers lost the game, the "Gum Time!" tradition has caught on among Detroit players and fans.

Robertson earned his first career postseason victory on October 10, 2006, by pitching five shutout innings against the Oakland Athletics in game 1 which helped launch the Detroit Tigers into their ALCS sweep of the A's and their first pennant since 1984.

In 2008, he tied for the major league lead in bunt hits allowed, with nine.

Robertson is also a part owner of the Wichita Wingnuts independent baseball organization.

On August 22, 2008, Tigers manager Jim Leyland announced that Nate was being demoted to the bullpen due to ongoing trouble with his slider. Nate was quoted by the Detroit Free Press as saying that it was the "lowest point" of his career.

=== Florida Marlins (second stint) ===
On March 30, 2010, Robertson was traded to the Florida Marlins for minor league pitcher Jay Voss and cash considerations. He was designated for assignment on July 21. He was released on July 27.

=== St. Louis Cardinals ===
On August 5, 2010, Robertson signed a minor league contract with the St. Louis Cardinals. He was assigned to the Triple-A Memphis Redbirds. Robertson exercised an opt-out clause on August 23,

=== Philadelphia Phillies ===
On August 25, 2010, Robertson signed a minor league contract with the Philadelphia Phillies, reporting to Triple-A Lehigh Valley. He had his contract selected to the major league roster on September 6. On September 9, 2010, Robertson was designated for assignment by the Phillies, a day after giving up 5 runs in 2/3 innings against the Marlins and nearly blowing a 10-run lead. He was released the next day.

=== Seattle Mariners ===
On January 20, 2011, Robertson signed a minor league contract with the Seattle Mariners with an invitation to Spring training. He elected free agency following the season on November 2.

=== Chicago Cubs ===
On February 18, 2012, Robertson signed a minor league contract with the Chicago Cubs. He was released on May 29.

=== Wichita Wingnuts ===
On June 18, 2012, Robertson signed with the Wichita Wingnuts of the American Association of Professional Baseball. In 3 starts 8 innings of work he went 0-0 with a 0.00 ERA and 6 strikeouts.

=== Toronto Blue Jays ===
On July 16, 2012, Robertson signed a minor league contract with the Toronto Blue Jays. The Blue Jays assigned Robertson to their AAA affiliate Las Vegas 51s. He elected free agency following the season November 2.

=== Texas Rangers ===
On January 26, 2013, the Texas Rangers signed Robertson to a minor league contract. He elected free agency following the season on November 4.

=== Detroit Tigers (second stint) ===
On March 6, 2014, Robertson signed a minor league deal with the Detroit Tigers. On May 17, 2014, Robertson was granted his release from the Tigers, as he was struggling with his command in Triple-A.

=== Coaching career ===
Robertson is now a pitching coach for Maize High School. In 2017, he won a state championship.
