= David Riske =

American baseball player (born 1976)

- Pitcher
- Born: October 23, 1976 (age 49); Renton, Washington, U.S.
- Batted: Right Threw: Right

MLB debut
- August 14, 1999, for the Cleveland Indians

Last MLB appearance
- August 15, 2010, for the Milwaukee Brewers

MLB statistics
- Win–loss record: 20–20
- Earned run average: 3.67
- Strikeouts: 441
- Stats at Baseball Reference

Teams
- Cleveland Indians (1999, 2001–2005); Boston Red Sox (2006); Chicago White Sox (2006); Kansas City Royals (2007); Milwaukee Brewers (2008–2010)

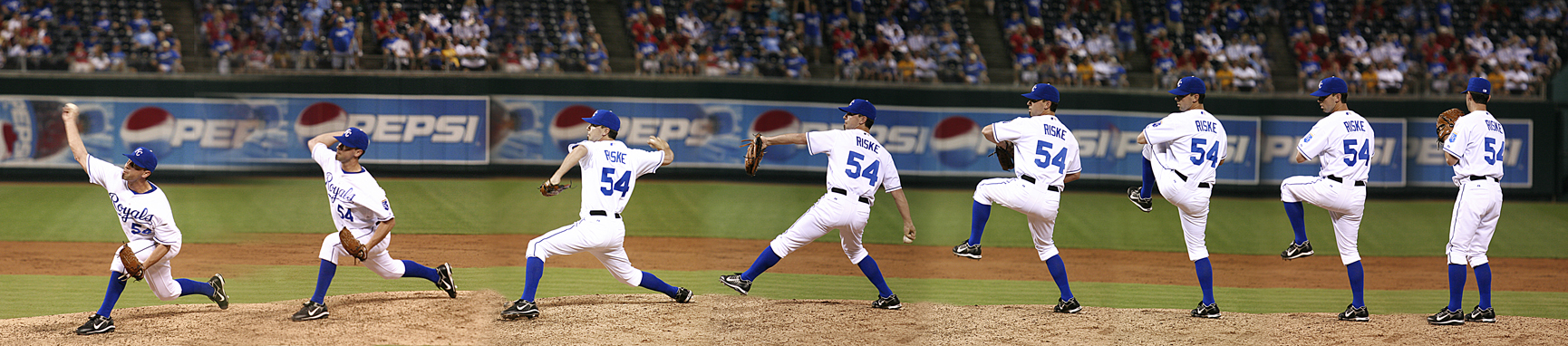
David Riske, pitching for the Kansas City Royals

David Richard Riske (/ˈrɪski/ RIS-kee; born October 23, 1976) is an American former Major League Baseball relief pitcher.

== Career ==
Riske was drafted by the Cleveland Indians in the 56th round of the June 1996 amateur draft. In January 2006, he was traded along with outfielder Coco Crisp, and catcher Josh Bard to the Boston Red Sox in exchange for reliever Guillermo Mota, third baseman Andy Marte, and catcher Kelly Shoppach.

Riske was traded on June 15 of that year to the Chicago White Sox for minor league pitcher Javier López. Theo Epstein commented that Riske was traded because the Red Sox had too many right-handed relievers, and needed a left-hander like Lopez. He throws a low-90s fastball, but due to his deceptive delivery, it appears even faster. He also throws a slider and a split-fingered fastball.

Having posted solid numbers the past two seasons, Riske continued to put up good numbers in the 2005 season. In 58 games and 72 2/3 innings, Riske had an ERA of 3.10 and a WHIP of 0.96. His strikeout total had noticeably declined over the past two seasons. In 2005 Riske experienced his first season in which he did not average more than one strikeout per inning pitched. He also is known for allowing home runs, allowing 11 in 2004 and 2005, and six in only 44 innings in 2006. Riske played a minor role with the Red Sox in 2006, mainly appearing in blow-out games before being traded.

=== Leader in the bullpen ===
Riske lead the Kansas City Royals bullpen to the best season they had had in years in 2007. Besides being a leader on the field, he was also a leader off. He was credited with helping turn around Zack Greinke's career.

On October 31, 2007, Riske declined his $2.9 million player option. Later, on December 5, he signed a three-year contract with the Milwaukee Brewers. He was part of the 2008 Brewers team that made the playoffs for the first time in more than 25 years. When future hall of famer C.C. Sabathia was traded from Cleveland to Milwaukee in the middle of that season, Sabathia recalled in 2025 that having his "best friend" Riske in the clubhouse at that time helped him transition to his new team as Sabathia led the team to the playoffs. Riske was released by the Brewers on August 23, 2010.

On February 7, 2011, Riske signed a minor league deal with the Baltimore Orioles. He was released after spring training, and retired.
