= Chad Durbin =

American baseball player (born 1977)

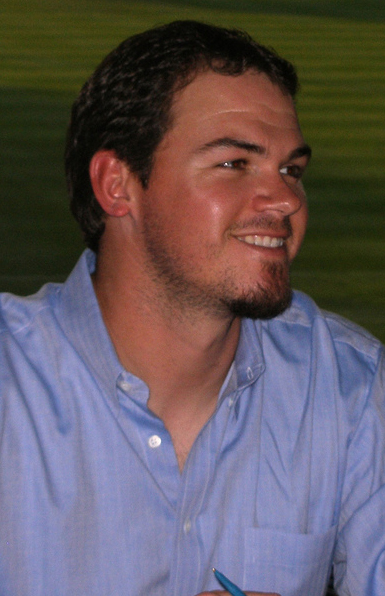
- Pitcher
- Born: December 3, 1977 (age 48); Spring Valley, Illinois, U.S.
- Batted: Right Threw: Right

MLB debut
- September 26, 1999, for the Kansas City Royals

Last MLB appearance
- May 30, 2013, for the Philadelphia Phillies

MLB statistics
- Win–loss record: 43–47
- Earned run average: 5.03
- Strikeouts: 577
- Stats at Baseball Reference

Teams
- Kansas City Royals (1999–2002); Cleveland Indians (2003–2004); Arizona Diamondbacks (2004); Detroit Tigers (2006–2007); Philadelphia Phillies (2008–2010); Cleveland Indians (2011); Atlanta Braves (2012); Philadelphia Phillies (2013)

Career highlights and awards
- World Series champion (2008)

Chad Griffin Durbin (born December 3, 1977), is an American former professional baseball pitcher, who played in Major League Baseball (MLB) for the Kansas City Royals, Cleveland Indians, and Detroit Tigers of the American League (AL), and the Arizona Diamondbacks, Philadelphia Phillies, and Atlanta Braves of the National League (NL).

Durbin attended Woodlawn High School, in Baton Rouge, Louisiana. He was drafted by the Kansas City Royals, in the 3rd round, 79th overall, of the 1996 Major League Baseball draft. Durbin's major league debut came in a scoreless relief appearance, for the Royals, on September 26, 1999.

== Professional career ==
=== Detroit Tigers ===
Durbin signed with the Tigers as a minor league free agent prior to the 2006 baseball season. He was a part of the 2006 International League champion Toledo Mud Hens, while also making 3 late-season appearances with the Tigers.

During 2007 spring training, Durbin was in the mix for one of the final spots in the Tigers bullpen. However, starting pitcher Kenny Rogers soon went on the disabled list with a shoulder injury, and the Tigers turned to Durbin to fill his spot in the rotation. Durbin served as a starting pitcher for several stints, before ultimately joining the bullpen. Pitching in relief, Durbin served several roles, including long relief and setup.

During a game on ESPN's Sunday Night Baseball against the Atlanta Braves, Durbin had a sacrifice fly for his first career RBI. He also recorded his first major league save in the same game. On December 12, 2007, Durbin was not offered a new contract by the Tigers and he became a free agent.

=== Philadelphia Phillies ===
On December 20, 2007, he signed with the Philadelphia Phillies to compete for a spot in their starting rotation. Though he lost out to Adam Eaton for a starting spot, Durbin enjoyed a strong season out of the bullpen for the eventual World Series Champions. In 2009, Durbin earned the first two postseason victories of his career, as he was the winning pitcher in Game 3 of the NLDS against the Colorado Rockies and Game 5 of the NLCS against the Los Angeles Dodgers. The latter clinched a second straight trip to the World Series for the Phillies, where they'd lose to the New York Yankees in six games. Durbin spent one more season with the Phillies before rejoining the Indians as a free agent on March 1, 2011.

=== Washington Nationals ===
Durbin signed a minor league contract with the Washington Nationals on February 1, 2012. He was released from Nationals after Spring Training.

=== Atlanta Braves ===
He was then signed by the Atlanta Braves to a one-year contract. With the Braves, he posted an ERA of 3.10.

=== Second Stint with Phillies ===
On January 28, 2013, Durbin signed a one-year deal with the Phillies with a base salary of $1.1 million and possible incentives totaling $350,000. The signing did not work out; the Phillies released Durbin on May 31, 2013, following a series of poor outings during which he had an ERA of 9.00.

Durbin retired on November 25, 2013.

== Post-playing career ==
In March 2022, it was announced that Durbin would join the Phillies radio broadcast team as a part-time color analyst. Durbin did not return for the 2023 season.

== Personal life ==
Durbin lives with his wife Crystal and sons Cade and Cavan and daughter Caris in Baton Rouge, Louisiana. Cade is a pitcher for the Southern Miss Golden Eagles baseball team.
