= Gil Meche =

American baseball player (born 1978)

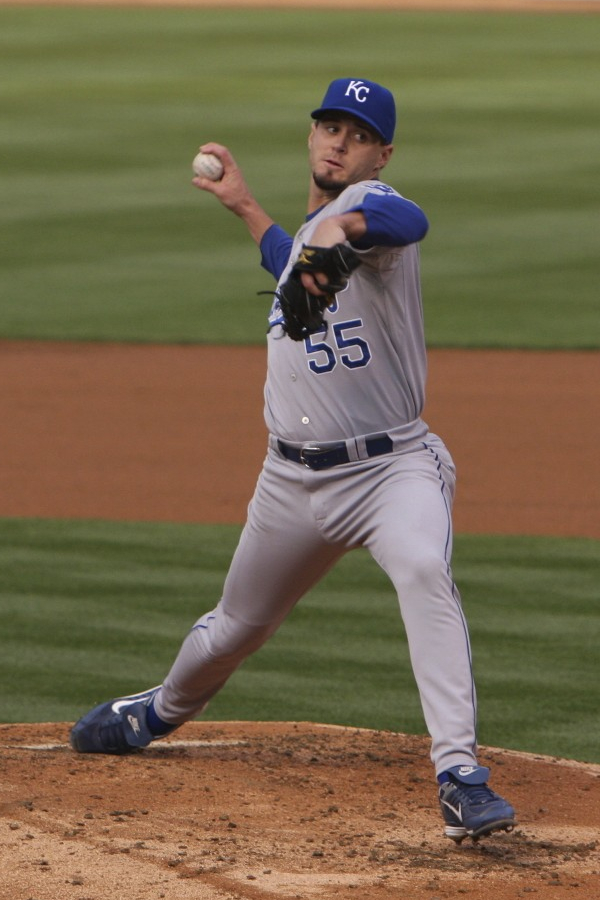
- Meche with the Kansas City Royals
- Pitcher
- Born: September 8, 1978 (age 47); Lafayette, Louisiana, U.S.
- Batted: Right Threw: Right

MLB debut
- July 6, 1999, for the Seattle Mariners

Last MLB appearance
- October 3, 2010, for the Kansas City Royals

MLB statistics
- Win–loss record: 84–83
- Earned run average: 4.49
- Strikeouts: 1,050
- Stats at Baseball Reference

Teams
- Seattle Mariners (1999–2000, 2003–2006); Kansas City Royals (2007–2010)

Career highlights and awards
- All-Star (2007)
Medals
Men's baseball
Representing United States
World Junior Baseball Championship
Gold medal – first place	1995 Massachusetts	Team

Gilbert Allen Meche (/ɡɪl mɛʃ/; born September 8, 1978) is an American former right-handed Major League Baseball starting pitcher. He pitched for the Seattle Mariners for six seasons between 1999 and 2006. He also made three straight Opening Day starts with the Kansas City Royals and was an All-Star with them in 2007. Shoulder and back problems caused him to retire in 2011 at just 32 years old.

== Early years ==
Meche, who is Cajun, was a star pitcher at Acadiana High School in his hometown of Lafayette, Louisiana, and was a member of the U.S. Junior Olympic team that won the gold medal in the 1995 World Junior Baseball Championship. After his junior year of high school, he earned most valuable pitcher honors at the 1995 National Amateur All-Star Tournament at just sixteen years old. However, shortly afterwards, he suffered a viral infection that caused him to miss a considerable amount of playing time his senior year. Nonetheless, he was named to the All-America Second Team by the American Baseball Coaches Association and Rawlings. He intended to attend Louisiana State University, but changed his mind when the Seattle Mariners surprised him by selecting him in the first round (22nd overall) of the 1996 Major League Baseball draft.

== Seattle Mariners ==
Meche debuted with the Mariners on July 6, 1999, two months shy of his twenty-first birthday, making him the second-youngest debut for the Mariners at that time (only Ken Griffey Jr. was younger). Pitching with a 2–1 lead over the Anaheim Angels and two outs in the sixth, he walked two consecutive batters to force in a run and surrender the lead. He ended up with a no-decision. On July 19, he allowed three earned runs in seven innings against the Arizona Diamondbacks, earning his first major league win in Seattle's 7–5 victory. For the season, he went 8–4 with a 4.73 earned run average (ERA) in 16 games (15 starts).

Meche lost his first four decisions of the 2000 season. On June 13, 2000, in a game shortened by rain, he tossed a five-inning, one-hit shutout against the Kansas City Royals. After coming back to go 4–0 with a 2.64 ERA through his July 4 start against Anaheim, he was lifted in the sixth inning having thrown 113 pitches. His season was cut short due to what was thought at the time to be a dead arm. He went 1–2 with a 3.15 ERA in five rehab starts, but did not pitch at the major league level again for the rest of the season. At the major league level, he was 4–4 with a 3.78 ERA in 15 starts with Seattle.

In February 2001, Meche underwent arthroscopic surgery to partially repair a frayed rotator cuff, and at the time was expected to only be on the disabled list for six months. He ended up missing the entire season and undergoing surgery again on October 3, 2001, on his right AC joint. He returned to pitching in 2002 for the Double-A San Antonio Missions of the Texas League, and went 4–6 with a 6.51 ERA in 25 games (13 starts).

Meche officially returned to the Mariners on April 5, 2003. Despite giving up four first inning runs and taking the loss against the Texas Rangers, he came back to pitch four solid innings in which he allowed just two earned runs on solo shots by Iván Rodríguez and Juan González. From there, he went 15–13 with a 4.59 ERA in 32 starts and 186 1/3 innings pitched. He went on to earn the Sporting News' American League Comeback Player of the Year Award at the end of the season.

Meche's 2004 season got off to a slow start, as his record stood at 1–5 with a 7.06 ERA following a June 1 start against the Toronto Blue Jays. He was optioned to the Triple-A Tacoma Rainiers of the Pacific Coast League after the game. He returned to the Mariners on July 30 and proceeded to go 6–2 with a 3.95 ERA in 13 second-half starts. On September 12, he tossed his first career nine-inning shutout against the Boston Red Sox. Overall, he finished 7–7 with a 5.01 ERA in 22 starts.

On January 13, 2005, Meche signed a one-year, $2.54 million contract with the Mariners to avoid arbitration. In 2005, he posted a winning record of 10–8, but had an ERA of 5.09 in 29 games (26 starts). He pitched 143 1/3 innings, and averaged less than six innings in over half of his starts.

On January 26, 2006, Meche avoided arbitration again, signing a one-year, $3.7 million contract. He finished the 2006 season with an 11–8 record and a 4.48 ERA in 32 starts. He also struck out 156 batters in 186 2/3 innings.

== Kansas City Royals ==
Meche signed a five-year, $55 million contract with the Kansas City Royals on December 7, 2006, matching Mike Sweeney's contract as the largest in club history until Alex Gordon agreed to a four-year $72 million deal in 2016. His record stood at 5–6 with a 3.28 ERA when he was named the Royals' sole representative at the 2007 Major League Baseball All-Star Game in San Francisco. He finished the season with a 9–13 record, while posting career bests in ERA (3.67), innings pitched (216) and a league-leading 34 starts.

Meche led the American League with 34 starts again in 2008 while improving to 14–11 with a 3.98 ERA and pitching over 200 innings for the second consecutive year for a Royals club that finished 75–87 and in fourth place in the American League Central.

On June 16, 2009, Meche pitched a four-hit shutout against the Diamondbacks to improve his season record to 4–5 with a 3.31 ERA. The 132 pitch count took a toll on him, however, and he began experiencing back and shoulder problems soon afterwards. For the rest of the 2009 season, he went just 2–5 with an 8.46 ERA in his final nine starts. He made 23 total starts, going 6–10 with a 5.09 ERA.

For the first time in his Royals career, the 31-year-old Meche did not receive the Opening Day nod for Kansas City in 2010. Instead, he was slated as the number-two starter behind reigning AL Cy Young Award winner Zack Greinke. He struggled throughout the season, and was 0–4 with a 6.66 ERA after making what would be his final career start on May 25. On May 30, he was placed on the disabled list with right shoulder bursitis, which marked his second stint on the DL for the season. After five rehab appearances with the Double-A Northwest Arkansas Naturals and Triple-A Omaha Royals, he returned to the Royals as a reliever that September. He made 11 appearances, giving up three earned runs in thirteen innings for a 2.08 ERA.

== Retirement ==
Seasons	W	L	PCT	ERA	G	GS	CG	SHO	SV	IP	H	ER	R	HR	BB	K	WP	HBP	Fld%
10	84	83	.503	4.49	258	243	7	3	0	1,432.1	1,441	714	772	176	594	1,050	38	29	.954

Despite a contract that called for a guaranteed $12 million salary in 2011, Meche chose to retire rather than play the last year. This was because the previous two years of the contract had been injury-ridden and it was planned that he would be a reliever for the 2011 season rather than a starting pitcher.

== In popular culture ==
The rock group Band of Horses, which was founded in Seattle in 2004, wrote and dedicated their song "Wicked Gil" to Meche.
