= 2007 Tampa Bay Devil Rays season =

2007 Tampa Bay Devil Rays
- League: American League
- Division: East
- Ballpark: Tropicana Field
- City: St. Petersburg, Florida
- Record: 66–96 (.407)
- Divisional place: 5th
- Owners: Stuart Sternberg
- General managers: Andrew Friedman
- Managers: Joe Maddon
- Television: FSN Florida; WXPX (Ion TV 66)
- Radio: WHNZ; WGES (Spanish)

10th anniversary logo

The Tampa Bay Devil Rays' 2007 season, the tenth season in franchise history, involved the Devil Rays trying to improve on their 2006 season, where they finished last in the American League East, and managed to finish the season with a league-worst record of 66–96. During the offseason they signed Japanese infielder Akinori Iwamura to a three-year deal. Their manager was Joe Maddon, who entered his second season with the Devil Rays.

Although the Devil Rays again finished last in the division, they improved their record by five games, to 66–96. Their season attendance increased by 18,653 to 1,387,603. This marks the first time home attendance has increased in consecutive seasons. Joe Maddon's option years through 2009 were picked up by the club on September 8, 2007. The season was marked by incredible pitching performances by club ace Scott Kazmir and rookie James Shields, and the bats of club standby Carl Crawford; rookies Delmon Young, B.J. Upton and Brendan Harris; and free agents Akinori Iwamura and Carlos Peña. Several club single-season records fell during the course of the season.

This was also the tenth and last season with the team being named the Devil Rays. The team dropped the "Devil" from the name. The following year, the team would win the AL East, beating the usual contenders in the Yankees and the Red Sox. The team would win the pennant, but lost to the Philadelphia Phillies in the World Series.

== Regular season ==
The Devil Rays opened their 2007 season April 2, on the road against the defending division champion New York Yankees. The bullpen blew a lead and Tampa Bay lost, 9–5, but came back to win the third game, 7-6 (the second of the opening series was rained out). They suffered a setback in the middle of April when new third baseman Iwamura, off to a hot start with a .339 batting average to that point, suffered an oblique strain and went on the disabled list. However, the team continued to play better than in past years, and on May 4 moved into a tie for second place, the latest that Tampa Bay had been that high in the standings since the 1999 season.

The Rays trailed off going into May, falling eventually back into last place, but surged into their series in Orlando, Florida, against the Texas Rangers, which they swept. After the series with the Rangers, they won only one of the next seven games, skidding to a then season low, nine games below .500.

After a 9–4 win against the Dodgers to improve their record to 33–40 on June 24, the Devil Rays went on to lose 11 straight games and went on to lose 13 of 14 games since the Dodgers series and went into the All-Star Break 34–53. After the break it wasn't much better losing 3 games out of 4 against the Yankees in their 1st series after the break and went on to lose 8 straight games between July 21 to 28. The low point of that losing streak were two dismal losses to the Yankees. One game losing 17-5 and the other 21–4. The Rays' lack of pitching between their two aces and closer Al Reyes led to the coining of the idiom, "Kazmir and Shields, then off come the wheels."

For the Devil Rays it was a July to forget but things were getting better in August. Improvements made to the bullpen at the trade deadline led to shorter losing streaks and, eventually, more series wins. On August 11, Starting pitcher Edwin Jackson pitched the Devil Rays 1st complete game shutout of the year in a 3–0 win against the Rangers. On August 25, Pitcher Scott Kazmir went 8 innings with a career high 13 strikeouts in a 14–3 win against the Oakland Athletics and in that series the Rays took 3 of 4 games out scoring the A's 33 to 9 in the last three games of that series. The hot streak continued with a sweep of the tailspinning Baltimore Orioles and series wins at the Yankees and home against the Orioles and the Blue Jays before finally losing 2 of 3 at the Boston Red Sox and splitting a 4-game series at the Seattle Mariners.

Their September upswing ensured that they would finish the 2007 season with a better record than the 2006 season. They did, however, hobble into the end of the season, with Carl Crawford's season-ending groin pull in late-September contributing to a 5-13 finish. They did win their final game of the season, though, giving hope for next year.

== New team records ==
Andy Sonnanstine broke a team record with seven consecutive strikeouts on June 10 in a victory over the Florida Marlins, his first win of the season.

On September 3, Carlos Peña broke the club single-season home run record, previously 34, held by José Canseco (1999) and Aubrey Huff (2003). Peña's 35th was a two-run homer off Jim Hoey in the seventh inning of a 9–7 victory over the Baltimore Orioles. On September 16, he became the first Rays player to hit 40 home runs in a season, the 40th being a leadoff homer coming off Jarrod Washburn in the 4th inning of a 9–2 victory over the Seattle Mariners. His 45th home run came off Dustin McGowan in the 5th inning of a 5–4 loss to the Toronto Blue Jays; it was the second of back-to-back homers, following Jorge Velandia's second homer of the season.

On September 27, Peña took the RBI record, previously set by Jorge Cantú at 117 in 2005. He tied it with an RBI single in the 1st inning for his 117th, and broke it with a solo home run in the 5th inning for his 118th. Both RBIs were off Chien-Ming Wang in a 12–4 loss to the New York Yankees. He finished the season with 46 home runs, 121 RBIs and a 1.037 OPS (.411 OBP, .627 SLG, both Rays season records), becoming the first Devil Ray to finish a season with at least a 1.000 OPS. Peña went on to win Comeback Player of the Year honors for the American League.

Carl Crawford approached the 1,000-hit plateau, but a groin pull in late September ended his season early, leaving him stuck at 990 career hits. He hit his 1000th hit on April 11, 2008. This was not be the first four-digit hit milestone for the club; Wade Boggs got his 3,000th hit while with the team in 1999. His injury, however, did not prevent him from finishing the season with a share of the AL stolen base title with Brian Roberts of the Baltimore Orioles. Both players finished the year with 50, marking the fourth time he's led or shared the lead in that category for a year.

Delmon Young became the first Rays rookie to play in every game of a 162-game season, setting a team record for most at bats taken in a season with 645. He is the second Rays player ever to play in every game in a season, after Aubrey Huff in 2003. Young was held from the lineup for the last game of the season after not hustling to first on a ground ball during the previous game, but apologized for not giving that game his all and entered the final game as a mid-game replacement. At the end of the season, he was considered a leading candidate for the AL Rookie of the Year award.

On September 10, Scott Kazmir became the first Rays pitcher to record 200 strikeouts in a season, in a 1–0 victory over the Boston Red Sox. His 200th strikeout victim for the year was Coco Crisp. He ultimately claimed the A.L. strikeout title, finishing the year with 239. (A one-game playoff permitted Jake Peavy to take the MLB strikeout title with 240.) Kazmir is also the first D-Ray starter to finish a season with at least 10 strikeouts per 9 innings (10.41).

During the course of the season, Scott Kazmir became the first Rays starting pitcher to log enough starts and innings to begin compiling rate-based team all-time pitching records, such as ERA.

== Season standings ==
AL East
Team	W	L	Pct.	GB	Home	Road
Boston Red Sox	96	66	.593	—	51‍–‍30	45‍–‍36
New York Yankees	94	68	.580	2	52‍–‍29	42‍–‍39
Toronto Blue Jays	83	79	.512	13	49‍–‍32	34‍–‍47
Baltimore Orioles	69	93	.426	27	35‍–‍46	34‍–‍47
Tampa Bay Devil Rays	66	96	.407	30	37‍–‍44	29‍–‍52

=== Record vs. opponents ===
2007 American League record Source: MLB Standings Grid – 2007
Team	BAL	BOS	CWS	CLE	DET	KC	LAA	MIN	NYY	OAK	SEA	TB	TEX	TOR	NL
Baltimore	—	6–12	5–3	3–4	1–5	7–0	3–7	0–7	9–9	4–4	2–7	11–7	4–6	8–10	6–12
Boston	12–6	—	7–1	5–2	3–4	3–3	6–4	4–3	8–10	4–4	4–5	13–5	6–4	9–9	12–6
Chicago	3–5	1–7	—	7–11	11–7	12–6	5–4	9–9	4–6	4–5	1–7	6–1	2–4	3–4	4–14
Cleveland	4–3	2–5	11–7	—	12–6	11–7	5–5	14–4	0–6	6–4	4–3	8–2	6–3	4–2	9–9
Detroit	5–1	4–3	7–11	6–12	—	11–7	3–5	12–6	4–4	4–6	6–4	3–4	5–4	4–3	14–4
Kansas City	0–7	3–3	6–12	7–11	7–11	—	5–2	9–9	1–9	6–4	3–6	4–3	5–4	3–4	10–8
Los Angeles	7–3	4–6	4–5	5–5	5–3	2–5	—	6–3	6–3	9–10	13–6	6–2	10–9	3–4	14–4
Minnesota	7–0	3–4	9–9	4–14	6–12	9–9	3–6	—	2–5	5–2	6–3	3–4	7–2	4–6	11–7
New York	9–9	10–8	6–4	6–0	4–4	9–1	3–6	5–2	—	2–4	5–5	10–8	5–1	10–8	10–8
Oakland	4–4	4–4	5–4	4–6	6–4	4–6	10–9	2–5	4–2	—	5–14	4–6	9–10	5–4	10–8
Seattle	7–2	5–4	7–1	3–4	4–6	6–3	6–13	3–6	5–5	14–5	—	4–3	11–8	4–5	9–9
Tampa Bay	7–11	5–13	1–6	2–8	4–3	3–4	2–6	4–3	8–10	6–4	3–4	—	5–4	9–9	7–11
Texas	6–4	4–6	4–2	3–6	4–5	4–5	9–10	2–7	1–5	10–9	8–11	4–5	—	5–5	11–7
Toronto	10–8	9–9	4–3	2–4	3–4	4–3	4–3	6–4	8–10	4–5	5–4	9–9	5–5	—	10–8

== Roster ==
2007 Tampa Bay Devil Rays
Roster
Pitchers: 50 Grant Balfour; 22 Shawn Camp; 56 Tim Corcoran; 27 Scott Dohmann; 15 Casey Fossum; 47 Gary Glover; 49 Jason Hammel; 39 J. P. Howell; 36 Edwin Jackson; 19 Scott Kazmir; 45 Ruddy Lugo; 54 Chad Orvella; 28 Al Reyes; 46 Jeff Ridgway; 11 Jae Kuk Ryu; 53 Juan Salas; 40 Jae Weong Seo; 33 James Shields; 38 Andy Sonnanstine; 41 Brian Stokes; 52 Jon Switzer; 35 Dan Wheeler; 45 Jay Witasick	Catchers: 17 Raul Casanova; 30 Dioner Navarro; 8 Josh Paul; 32 Shawn Riggans; Infielders: 3 Jorge Cantú; 29 Joel Guzmán; 16 Brendan Harris; 1 Akinori Iwamura; 23 Carlos Peña; 3 Jorge Velandia; 21 Ty Wigginton; 9 Josh Wilson; 18 Ben Zobrist	Outfielders: 5 Rocco Baldelli; 13,42 Carl Crawford; 35 Elijah Dukes; 31 Jonny Gomes; 10 Dustan Mohr; 14 Greg Norton; 10 Justin Ruggiano; 2 B. J. Upton; 26 Delmon Young	Manager: 70 Joe Maddon; Coaches: 20 Bill Evers (bench); 6 Tom Foley (third base); 55 Steve Henderson (hitting); 25 George Hendrick (first base); 48 Jim Hickey (pitching); 7 Bobby Ramos (bullpen); 59 Don Zimmer (senior advisor)

== Game log ==
2007 game log
April

#	Date	Opponent	Score	Win	Loss	Save	Attendance	Record
1	April 2	@ Yankees	9 – 5	Vizcaíno (1–0)	Stokes (0–1)		55,035	0–1
--	April 4	@ Yankees	Postponed (rain) Rescheduled for July 21					0–1
2	April 5	@ Yankees	7 – 6	Lugo (1–0)	Vizcaíno (1-1)	Reyes (1)	52,096	1-1
3	April 6	Blue Jays	6 – 5	Ryu (1–0)	Ryan (0–1)		38,437	2–1
4	April 7	Blue Jays	8 – 5	Marcum (1–0)	Fossum (0–1)	Ryan (2)	18,495	2-2
5	April 8	Blue Jays	6 – 3	Halladay (1–0)	Kazmir (0–1)	Janssen (1)	12,436	2–3
6	April 9	@ Rangers	8 – 4	McCarthy (1-1)	Jackson (0–1)		21,547	2–4
7	April 10	@ Rangers	12 – 9	Feldman (1–0)	Seo (0–1)		23,897	2–5
8	April 11	@ Rangers	6 – 5	Shields (1–0)	Tejeda (1-1)		33,674	3–5
9	April 12	@ Twins	3 – 2	Nathan (1–0)	Stokes (0–2)		15,869	3–6
10	April 13	@ Twins	4 – 2	Kazmir (2–0)	Santana (2–1)	Reyes (3)	27,783	4–6
11	April 14	@ Twins	12 – 5	Ponson (1-1)	Jackson (0–2)		35,269	4–7
12	April 15	@ Twins	6 – 4	Stokes (1–2)	Nathan (1-1)	Reyes (4)	27,024	5–7
13	April 16	Orioles	9 – 7	Guthrie (1–0)	Ryu (1-1)	Ray (4)	9,157	5–8
14	April 17	Orioles	6 – 4	Fossum (1-1)	Trachsel (0–1)	Reyes (5)	9,575	6–8
15	April 18	Orioles	6 – 4	Bédard (3–1)	Glover (0–1)	Ray (5)	10,540	6–9
16	April 20	Indians	4 – 3	Hernández (1-1)	Salas (0–1)	Borowski (6)	13,391	6–10
17	April 21	Indians	6 – 5	Seo (1-1)	Byrd (1-1)	Reyes (6)	22,805	7–10
18	April 22	Indians	6 – 4	Mastny (1–0)	Stokes (1–3)	Borowski (7)	18,131	7–11
19	April 23	Yankees	10 – 8	Fossum (2–1)	Igawa (1-1)		20,409	8–11
20	April 24	Yankees	4 – 6	Salas (1-1)	Wang (0–1)	Reyes (7)	22,328	9–11
21	April 25	@ Angels	9 – 1	Lackey (3–2)	Jackson (0–3)		36,850	9–12
22	April 26	@ Angels	11 – 3	Colón (2–0)	Seo (1–2)		35,597	9–13
23	April 27	@ Athletics	4 – 1	Shields (2–0)	Gaudin (1-1)	Reyes (8)	15,388	10–13
24	April 28	@ Athletics	12 – 5	Haren (3–2)	Fossum (2-2)		26,760	10–14
25	April 29	@ Athletics	5 – 3	Kazmir (2–1)	Braden (1-1)	Reyes (9)	23,827	11–14

May

#	Date	Opponent	Score	Win	Loss	Save	Attendance	Record
26	May 1	Twins	9 – 1	Ponson (2–3)	Jackson (0–4)		8,773	11–15
27	May 2	Twins	4 – 3 (10)	Reyes (1–0)	Guerrier (0–1)		9,101	12–15
28	May 3	Twins	6 – 4	Shields (3–0)	Ortiz (3–2)	Reyes (10)	8,793	13–15
29	May 4	Athletics	5 – 2	Duchscherer (3–1)	Glover (0–2)	Street (8)	11,546	13–16
30	May 5	Athletics	3 – 2 (12)	Lugo (2–0)	Marshall (1–2)		16,604	14–16
31	May 6	Athletics	5 – 3	Blanton (3–1)	Jackson (0–5)	Street (9)	16,880	14–17
32	May 8	@ Orioles	8 – 3	Guthrie (2–1)	Seo (1–3)		17,818	14–18
33	May 9	@ Orioles	1 – 0 (10)	Parrish (1–0)	Stokes (1–4)		14,780	14–19
34	May 10	@ Orioles	11 – 6	Cabrera (3-3)	Fossum (2–3)		15,915	14–20
35	May 11	@ Blue Jays	5 – 1	Burnett (3-3)	Kazmir (2-2)		20,542	14–21
36	May 12	@ Blue Jays	5 – 4	Downs (1–0)	Stokes (1–5)	Accardo (1)	23,208	14–22
37	May 13	@ Blue Jays	2 – 1	Seo (2–3)	Frasor (1–2)	Reyes (11)	25,453	15–22
38	May 15	Rangers*	4 – 3 (10)	Stokes (2–5)	Feldman (1–2)		8,443	16–22
39	May 16	Rangers*	11 – 8	Fossum (3-3)	Padilla (1–6)	Reyes (12)	8,839	17–22
40	May 17	Rangers*	8 – 6 (10)	Glover (1–2)	Eyre (1–2)		9,635	18–22
41	May 18	Marlins	8 – 4	Kim (2-2)	Jackson (0–6)		13,003	18–23
42	May 19	Marlins	7 – 2	Willis (6–3)	Seo (2–4)		19,566	18–24
43	May 20	Marlins	4 – 3	Mitre (2-2)	Shawn Camp (0–1)	Gregg (3)	23,554	18–25
44	May 22	Mariners	5 – 2	Washburn (4-4)	Orvella (0–1)	Putz (11)	9,254	18–26
45	May 23	Mariners	5 – 1	Batista (4-4)	Fossum (3–4)		8,440	18–27
46	May 24	Mariners	13 – 12	Seo (3–4)	White (1-1)		9,149	19–27
47	May 25	@ White Sox	5 – 4	Jenks (2–1)	Orvella (0–2)		34,538	19–28
--	May 26	@ White Sox	Postponed (rain) Rescheduled for August 27					19–28
48	May 27	@ White Sox	11 – 5	Kazmir (3–2)	Vázquez (2–3)		38,103	20–28
49	May 28	Tigers	6 – 5	Glover (2-2)	Jones (1–2)		14,769	21–28
50	May 29	Tigers	14 – 2	Bonderman (4–0)	Fossum (3–5)		11,518	21–29
51	May 30	Tigers	5 – 3	Shields (4–0)	Robertson (4–5)		12,435	22–29
*At Walt Disney World in Orlando, Florida

June

#	Date	Opponent	Score	Win	Loss	Save	Attendance	Record
52	June 1	Royals	4 – 1	Bannister (1–3)	Kazmir (3-3)	Dotel (1)	12,032	22–30
53	June 2	Royals	9 – 4	Pérez (3–5)	Jackson (0–7)		14,403	22–31
54	June 3	Royals	5 – 1	Howell (1–0)	Elarton (1–2)		12,220	23–31
55	June 4	Royals	4 – 2	Shields (5–0)	Meche (3–5)	Reyes (14)	9,435	24–31
56	June 5	@ Blue Jays	12 – 11	Towers (2–3)	Fossum (3–6)		19,063	24–32
57	June 6	@ Blue Jays	6 – 2	Kazmir (4–3)	Ohka (2–5)		16,663	25–32
58	June 7	@ Blue Jays	5 – 3	Glover (3–2)	Accardo (1-1)	Reyes (15)	37,105	26–32
59	June 8	@ Marlins	14 – 8	Miller (2–0)	Stokes (2–6)		13,520	26–33
60	June 9	@ Marlins	7 – 2	Shields (6–0)	Willis (7–5)		20,189	27–33
61	June 10	@ Marlins	9 – 4	Sonnanstine (1–0)	VandenHurk (1–2)		11,525	28–33
62	June 12	Padres	11 – 4	Fossum (4–6)	Meredith (2–5)		12,870	29–33
63	June 13	Padres	9 – 0	Peavy (8–1)	Jackson (0–8)		12,020	29–34
64	June 14	Padres	7 – 1	Germano (5–0)	Howell (1-1)		19,270	29–35
65	June 15	@ Rockies	12 – 2	López (3–0)	Shields (6–1)		25,762	29–36
66	June 16	@ Rockies	10 – 5	Buchholz (4–3)	Sonnanstine (1-1)		30,101	29–37
67	June 17	@ Rockies	7 – 4	Kazmir (5–3)	Cook (4-4)	Reyes (16)	31,190	30–37
68	June 18	@ D-backs	10 – 2	Hammel (1–0)	Hernández (5-5)		18,963	31–37
69	June 19	@ D-backs	10 – 8 (10)	Lyon (5–2)	Reyes (1-1)		19,761	31–38
70	June 20	@ D-backs	7 – 4	Owings (5–1)	Shields (6–2)	Valverde (23)	31,805	31–39
71	June 22	Dodgers	6 – 3	Lowe (8–6)	Sonnanstine (1–2)	Saito (20)	14,961	31–40
72	June 23	Dodgers	4 – 3	Fossum (5–6)	Wolf (8–6)	Reyes (17)	24,068	32–40
73	June 24	Dodgers	9 – 4	Jackson (1–8)	Kuo (1–3)		18,248	33–40
74	June 25	White Sox	5 – 4	Danks (4–6)	Fossum (5–7)	Jenks (19)	10,514	33–41
75	June 26	White Sox	6 – 1	Garland (5-5)	Shields (6–3)		11,954	33–42
76	June 27	White Sox	5 – 3	Buehrle (5–4)	Glover (3-3)	Jenks (20)	10,492	33–43
77	June 28	White Sox	5 – 1	Vázquez (4–5)	Kazmir (5–4)		13,496	33–44
78	June 29	@ Indians	2 – 1	Borowski (1–3)	Shawn Camp (0–2)		34,557	33–45
79	June 30	@ Indians	8 – 6	Sabathia (12–2)	Howell (1–2)	Borowski (23)	36,726	33–46

July

#	Date	Opponent	Score	Win	Loss	Save	Attendance	Record
80	July 1	@ Indians	3 – 2	Lee (5–4)	Shields (6–4)	Borowski (24)	30,410	33–47
81	July 2	@ Indians	10 – 2	Carmona (9–4)	Sonnanstine (1–3)		34,372	33–48
82	July 3	@ Red Sox	4 – 1	Matsuzaka (10–5)	Kazmir (5-5)		37,005	33–49
83	July 4	@ Red Sox	7 – 5	Wakefield (9–8)	Jackson (1–9)	Papelbon (20)	36,629	33–50
84	July 5	@ Red Sox	15 – 4	Beckett (12–2)	Howell (1–3)		37,044	33–51
85	July 6	@ Royals	6 – 5	Shields (7–4)	Pérez (4–8)	Glover (1)	18,753	34–51
86	July 7	@ Royals	8 – 7	Dotel (2–1)	Shawn Camp (0–3)		20,458	34–52
87	July 8	@ Royals	12 – 4	de la Rosa (7–9)	Kazmir (5–6)		14,726	34–53
88	July 12	Yankees	7 – 3	Pettitte (5–6)	Shields (7–5)		21,907	34–54
89	July 13	Yankees	6 – 4	Kazmir (6-6)	Clemens (2–4)	Glover (2)	29,803	35–54
90	July 14	Yankees	6 – 4	Wang (10–4)	Sonnanstine (1–4)	Rivera (12)	36,048	35–55
91	July 15	Yankees	7 – 6	Vizcaíno (5–2)	Fossum (5–8)	Rivera (13)	36,048	35–56
92	July 17	Angels	8 – 3	Shields (8–5)	Santana (5–11)		9,430	36–56
93	July 18	Angels	7 – 2	Kazmir (7–6)	Colón (6–5)		13,521	37–56
94	July 19	Angels	3 – 0	Escobar (11–3)	Sonnanstine (1–5)	Rodríguez (25)	18,163	37–57
95	July 20	@ Yankees	14 – 4	Jackson (2–9)	Mussina (4–7)		53,957	38–57
96	July 21	@ Yankees	7 – 3	Vizcaíno (7–2)	Ryu (1–2)		54,412	38–58
97	July 21	@ Yankees	17 – 5	Vizcaíno (8–2)	Howell (1–4)		52,983	38–59
98	July 22	@ Yankees	21 – 4	Pettitte (6-6)	Shields (8–6)		54,751	38–60
99	July 24	@ Orioles	3 – 0	Cabrera (7–10)	Kazmir (7-7)	Walker (2)	42,579	38–61
100	July 25	@ Orioles	6 – 1	Bédard (10–4)	Sonnanstine (1–6)		21,427	38–62
101	July 26	@ Orioles	10 – 7	Bell (3–1)	Jackson (2–10)		22,393	38–63
102	July 27	Red Sox	7 – 1	Wakefield (12–9)	Hammel (1-1)		33,144	38–64
103	July 28	Red Sox	12 – 6 (12)	Snyder (2-2)	Stokes (2–7)		36,048	38–65
104	July 29	Red Sox	5 – 2	Glover (4–3)	Matsuzaka (12–8)		34,813	39–65
105	July 30	Blue Jays	5 – 4 (11)	Dohmann (1–0)	Wolfe (2–1)		8,807	40–65
106	July 31	Blue Jays	2 – 0	Litsch (4-4)	Jackson (2–11)	Accardo (18)	10,569	40–66

August

#	Date	Opponent	Score	Win	Loss	Save	Attendance	Record
107	August 1	Blue Jays	6 – 2	Glover (5–3)	Towers (5–8)		10,109	41–66
108	August 3	Orioles	3 – 1	Cabrera (8–11)	Shields (8–7)	Báez (1)	15,542	41–67
109	August 4	Orioles	9 – 2	Kazmir (8–7)	Burres (5-5)		18,230	42–67
110	August 5	Orioles	11 – 3	Bédard (12–4)	Sonnanstine (1–7)		19,845	42–68
111	August 6	@ Tigers	6 – 4	Miner (2–3)	Glover (5–4)	Jones (29)	39,289	42–69
112	August 7	@ Tigers	9 – 6	Byrdak (1–0)	Wheeler (1–5)	Jones (30)	35,288	42–70
113	August 8	@ Tigers	7 – 1	Shields (9–7)	Durbin (7–4)		37,777	43–70
114	August 9	@ Tigers	8 – 1	Kazmir (9–7)	Bonderman (10–5)		38,789	44–70
115	August 10	@ Rangers	7 – 4	Wood (2–1)	Sonnanstine (1–8)	Wilson (4)	28,314	44–71
116	August 11	@ Rangers	3 – 0	Jackson (3–11)	Rheinecker (1-1)		36,709	45–71
117	August 12	@ Rangers	9 – 1	Eyre (4–5)	Hammel (1–2)		24,042	45–72
118	August 13	@ Red Sox	3 – 0	Wakefield (14–10)	Shields (9–8)	Papelbon (28)	36,808	45–73
119	August 14	@ Red Sox	2 – 1	Gagné (3–0)	Reyes (1–2)		36,837	45–74
120	August 15	@ Red Sox	6 – 5	Sonnanstine (2–8)	Matsuzaka (13–9)	Reyes (18)	36,413	46–74
121	August 17	Indians	2 – 1	Byrd (11–5)	Jackson (3–12)	Borowski (34)	15,343	46–75
122	August 18	Indians	8 – 1	Westbrook (4–7)	Hammel (1–3)		24,397	46–76
123	August 19	Indians	4 – 3 (12)	Dohmann (2–0)	Pérez (0–1)		22,328	47–76
124	August 20	Red Sox	6 – 0	Wakefield (15–10)	Kazmir (9–8)		16,843	47–77
125	August 21	Red Sox	8 – 6	Lester (2–0)	Sonnanstine (2–9)	Papelbon (30)	16,393	47–78
126	August 22	Red Sox	2 – 1	Jackson (4–12)	Matsuzaka (13–10)	Reyes (19)	17,839	48–78
127	August 23	Athletics	12 – 2	Gaudin (10–9)	Hammel (1–4)		9,444	48–79
128	August 24	Athletics	12 – 2	Shields (10–8)	DiNardo (8–7)		9,592	49–79
129	August 25	Athletics	14 – 3	Kazmir (10–8)	Blanton (11–9)		18,163	50–79
130	August 26	Athletics	7 – 4	Sonnanstine (3–9)	Haren (14–5)	Reyes (20)	19,044	51–79
131	August 27	@ White Sox	5 – 4	Contreras (7–16)	Wheeler (1–6)	Jenks (36)	37,030	51–80
132	August 28	@ Orioles	15 – 8	Dohmann (3–0)	Hoey (1–3)		17,781	52–80
133	August 29	@ Orioles	5 – 4 (12)	Balfour (1–2)	Bell (3-3)	Reyes (21)	16,944	53–80
134	August 30	@ Orioles	8 – 6	Kazmir (11–8)	Guthrie (7–5)	Reyes (22)	17,546	54–80
135	August 31	@ Yankees	9 – 1	Sonnanstine (4–9)	Hughes (2–3)		53,275	55–80

September

#	Date	Opponent	Score	Win	Loss	Save	Attendance	Record
136	September 1	@ Yankees	9 – 6	Kennedy (1–0)	Jackson (4–13)	Rivera (23)	53,637	55–81
137	September 2	@ Yankees	8 – 2	Hammel (2–4)	Pettitte (12–8)		53,957	56–81
138	September 3	Orioles	9 – 7	Shields (11–8)	Hoey (1–4)		10,350	57–81
139	September 4	Orioles	8 – 4	Bradford (3–6)	Wheeler (1–7)		9,112	57–82
140	September 5	Orioles	17 – 2	Sonnanstine (5–9)	Liz (0–2)		9,856	58–82
141	September 7	Blue Jays	7 – 2	McGowan (10–8)	Jackson (4–14)		18,617	58–83
142	September 8	Blue Jays	5 – 4	Reyes (2-2)	Accardo (4-4)		19,822	59–83
143	September 9	Blue Jays	3 – 2	Shields (10–8)	Litsch (5–8)	Reyes (23)	20,556	60–83
144	September 10	@ Red Sox	2 – 1	Kazmir (12–8)	Schilling (8–7)	Reyes (24)	36,907	61–83
145	September 11	@ Red Sox	16 – 10	Corey (1–0)	Switzer (0–1)		36,640	61–84
146	September 12	@ Red Sox	5 – 4	Papelbon (1–2)	Reyes (2–3)		36,931	61–85
147	September 13	@ Mariners	8 – 7	Rowland-Smith (1–0)	Wheeler (1–8)	Putz (38)	23,991	61–86
148	September 14	@ Mariners	2 – 1	Putz (4–1)	Glover (5-5)		30,164	61–87
149	September 15	@ Mariners	6 – 2	Kazmir (13–8)	H. Ramírez (8–7)		33,793	62–87
150	September 16	@ Mariners	9 – 2	Sonnanstine (6–9)	Washburn (9–15)		36,234	63–87
151	September 17	@ Angels	10 – 7	Oliver (3–0)	Jackson (4–15)		37,530	63–88
152	September 18	@ Angels	2 – 1	Lackey (17–9)	Hammel (2–5)	Rodríguez (36)	36,313	63–89
153	September 19	@ Angels	2 – 1	Santana (7–13)	Howell (1–5)	Rodríguez (37)	33,699	63–90
154	September 21	Red Sox	8 – 1	Beckett (20–6)	Kazmir (13–9)		27,369	63–91
155	September 22	Red Sox	8 – 6	Gagné (4–2)	Reyes (2–4)	Papelbon (36)	34,626	63–92
156	September 23	Red Sox	5 – 4	Jackson (5–15)	Wakefield (16–12)	Reyes (25)	30,310	64–92
157	September 25	Yankees	7 – 6 (10)	Glover (6–5)	Karstens (1–4)		24,503	65–92
158	September 26	Yankees	12 – 4	Wang (19–7)	Howell (1–6)		21,621	65–93
159	September 27	Yankees	3 – 1	Hughes (5–3)	Switzer (0–2)	Veras (1)	28,962	65–94
160	September 28	@ Blue Jays	5 – 4	McGowan (12–10)	Sonnanstine (6–10)	Accardo (30)	34,670	65–95
161	September 29	@ Blue Jays	5 – 3	Downs (4–2)	Wheeler (1–9)		37,681	65–96
162	September 30	@ Blue Jays	8 – 5	Hammel (3–5)	Burnett (10–8)	Reyes (26)	44,156	66–96

== Player stats ==
=== Batting ===
==== Starters by position ====
Note: Pos = Position; G = Games played; AB = At bats; H = Hits; Avg. = Batting average; HR = Home runs; RBI = Runs batted in

Pos	Player	G	AB	H	Avg.	HR	RBI
C	Dioner Navarro	119	388	88	.227	9	44
1B	Carlos Peña	148	490	138	.282	46	121
2B	Ty Wigginton	98	378	104	.275	16	49
SS	Brendan Harris	137	521	149	.286	12	59
3B	Akinori Iwamura	123	491	140	.285	7	34
LF	Carl Crawford	143	584	184	.315	11	80
CF	B.J. Upton	129	474	142	.300	24	82
RF	Delmon Young	162	645	186	.288	13	93
DH	Greg Norton	75	202	49	.243	4	23

==== Other batters ====
Note: G = Games played; AB = At bats; H = Hits; Avg. = Batting average; HR = Home runs; RBI = Runs batted in

Player	G	AB	H	Avg.	HR	RBI
Jonny Gomes	107	348	85	.244	17	49
Josh Wilson	90	263	66	.251	2	24
Elijah Dukes	52	184	35	.190	10	21
Rocco Baldelli	35	137	28	.204	5	12
Josh Paul	35	105	20	.190	1	9
Ben Zobrist	31	97	15	.155	1	9
Raul Casanova	29	79	20	.253	6	11
Jorge Cantú	25	58	12	.207	0	4
Jorge Velandia	14	50	16	.320	2	11
Joel Guzmán	16	37	9	.243	0	4
Dustan Mohr	7	16	2	.125	1	2
Justin Ruggiano	7	14	3	.214	0	3
Shawn Riggans	3	10	1	.100	0	2

=== Pitching ===
==== Starting pitchers ====
Note: G = Games pitched; IP = Innings pitched; W = Wins; L = Losses; ERA = Earned run average; SO = Strikeouts

Player	G	IP	W	L	ERA	SO
James Shields	31	215.0	12	8	3.85	184
Scott Kazmir	34	206.2	13	9	3.48	239
Edwin Jackson	32	161.0	5	15	5.76	128
Andy Sonnanstine	22	130.2	6	10	5.85	97
Jae Weong Seo	11	52.0	3	4	8.13	28
J.P. Howell	10	51.0	1	6	7.59	49

==== Other pitchers ====
Note: G = Games pitched; IP = Innings pitched; W = Wins; L = Losses; ERA = Earned run average; SO = Strikeouts

Player	G	IP	W	L	ERA	SO
Jason Hammel	24	85.0	3	5	6.14	64
Casey Fossum	40	76.0	5	8	7.70	53

==== Relief pitchers ====
Note: G = Games pitched; W = Wins; L = Losses; SV = Saves; ERA = Earned run average; SO = Strikeouts

Player	G	W	L	SV	ERA	SO
Al Reyes	61	2	4	26	4.90	70
Gary Glover	67	6	5	2	4.89	51
Brian Stokes	59	2	7	0	7.07	35
Shawn Camp	50	0	3	0	7.20	36
Juan Salas	34	1	1	0	3.72	26
Scott Dohmann	31	3	0	0	3.31	26
Dan Wheeler	25	0	5	0	5.76	26
Grant Balfour	22	1	0	0	6.14	27
Jon Switzer	21	0	2	0	8.05	13
Jay Witasick	20	0	0	0	6.61	8
Jae Kuk Ryu	17	1	2	0	7.33	14
Ruddy Lugo	11	2	0	0	9.28	8
Chad Orvella	10	0	2	0	14.63	6
Tim Corcoran	9	0	0	0	6.75	6
Jeff Ridgway	3	0	0	0	189.00	0
Josh Wilson	1	0	0	0	0.00	0

== Farm system ==
Level	Team	League	Manager
AAA	Durham Bulls	International League	Charlie Montoyo
AA	Montgomery Biscuits	Southern League	Billy Gardner Jr.
A	Vero Beach Devil Rays	Florida State League	Joe Szekely
A	Columbus Catfish	South Atlantic League	Jim Morrison
A-Short Season	Hudson Valley Renegades	New York–Penn League	Matt Quatraro
Rookie	Princeton Devil Rays	Appalachian League	Jamie Nelson

LEAGUE CHAMPIONS: Montgomery, Columbus
