= 2006 Tampa Bay Devil Rays season =

2006 Tampa Bay Devil Rays
- League: American League
- Division: East
- Ballpark: Tropicana Field
- City: St. Petersburg, Florida
- Record: 61–101 (.377)
- Divisional place: 5th
- Owners: Stuart Sternberg
- General managers: Andrew Friedman
- Managers: Joe Maddon
- Television: FSN Florida; WXPX (Joe Magrane, Dewayne Staats)
- Radio: WHNZ (Dave Wills, Andy Freed); WMGG (Ricardo Taveras, Enrique Oliu)

The 2006 Tampa Bay Devil Rays season was their ninth since the franchise was created. They finished last in the American League East, posting a league-worst record of 61–101. Their manager was Joe Maddon, who entered his first season with the Devil Rays. The Devil Rays' offense had the fewest runs (689), hits (1,395) and RBI (650) in Major League Baseball, as well as the joint-lowest batting average (.255) and lowest on-base percentage (.314).

== Offseason ==
- December 2, 2005: Pete LaForest was selected off waivers by the San Diego Padres from the Tampa Bay Devil Rays.
- December 7, 2005: Dewon Brazelton was traded by the Tampa Bay Devil Rays to the San Diego Padres for Sean Burroughs.
- January 18, 2006: Luis Rivas was signed as a free agent with the Tampa Bay Devil Rays.
- January 31, 2006: Russell Branyan was signed as a free agent with the Tampa Bay Devil Rays.

== Regular season ==
=== Season standings ===
AL East
Team	W	L	Pct.	GB	Home	Road
New York Yankees	97	65	.599	—	50‍–‍31	47‍–‍34
Toronto Blue Jays	87	75	.537	10	50‍–‍31	37‍–‍44
Boston Red Sox	86	76	.531	11	48‍–‍33	38‍–‍43
Baltimore Orioles	70	92	.432	27	40‍–‍41	30‍–‍51
Tampa Bay Devil Rays	61	101	.377	36	41‍–‍40	20‍–‍61

=== Record vs. opponents ===
2006 American League record Source: MLB Standings Grid – 2006
Team	BAL	BOS	CWS	CLE	DET	KC	LAA	MIN	NYY	OAK	SEA	TB	TEX	TOR	NL
Baltimore	—	3–15	2–5	4–2	3–3	5–1	4–6	3–6	7–12	2–4	4–6	13–6	3–6	8–11	9–9
Boston	15–3	—	4–2	3–4	3–3	4–5	3–3	1–5	8–11	3–7	4–6	10–9	5–4	7–12	16–2
Chicago	5–2	2–4	—	8–11	12–7	11–8	6–3	9–10	2–4	3–3	5–4	3–3	5–5	5–4	14–4
Cleveland	2–4	4–3	11–8	—	6–13	10–8	4–5	8–11	3–4	3–6	4–5	6–1	5–4	4–2	8–10
Detroit	3–3	3–3	7–12	13–6	—	14–4	3–5	11–8	2–5	5–4	6–3	5–3	5–5	3–3	15–3
Kansas City	1–5	5–4	8–11	8–10	4–14	—	3–7	7–12	2–7	4–5	3–5	1–5	3–3	3–4	10–8
Los Angeles	6–4	3–3	3–6	5–4	5–3	7–3	—	4–2	6–4	11–8	10–9	7–2	11–8	4–6	7–11
Minnesota	6–3	5–1	10–9	11–8	8–11	12–7	2–4	—	3–3	6–4	5–3	6–1	4–5	2–5	16–2
New York	12–7	11–8	4–2	4–3	5–2	7–2	4–6	3–3	—	3–6	3–3	13–5	8–2	10–8	10–8
Oakland	4–2	7–3	3–3	6–3	4–5	5–4	8–11	4–6	6–3	—	17–2	6–3	9–10	6–4	8–10
Seattle	6–4	6–4	4–5	5–4	3–6	5–3	9–10	3–5	3–3	2–17	—	6–3	8–11	4–5	14–4
Tampa Bay	6–13	9–10	3–3	1–6	3–5	5–1	2–7	1–6	5–13	3–6	3–6	—	3–6	6–12	11–7
Texas	6–3	4–5	5–5	4–5	5–5	3–3	8–11	5–4	2–8	10–9	11–8	6–3	—	4–2	7–11
Toronto	11–8	12–7	4–5	2–4	3–3	4–3	6–4	5–2	8–10	4–6	5–4	12–6	2–4	—	9–9

=== Opening Day starters ===
- Carl Crawford
- Jonny Gomes
- Nick Green
- Toby Hall
- Damon Hollins
- Aubrey Huff
- Travis Lee
- Seth McClung
- Tomás Pérez
- Ty Wigginton

=== Transactions ===
- Evan Longoria was drafted by the Tampa Bay Devil Rays in the 1st round of the June amateur draft.
- July 12, 2006: Aubrey Huff was traded by the Tampa Bay Devil Rays with cash to the Houston Astros for Ben Zobrist and Mitch Talbot (minors).
- August 24, 2006: Russell Branyan was traded by the Tampa Bay Devil Rays to the San Diego Padres for a player to be named later and Evan Meek (minors). The San Diego Padres sent Dale Thayer (minors) (September 15, 2006) to the Tampa Bay Devil Rays to complete the trade.

=== Roster ===
2006 Tampa Bay Devil Rays
Roster
Pitchers: 59 Shawn Camp; 39 Jason Childers; 49 Jesús Colomé; 56 Tim Corcoran; 47 Scott Dunn; 15 Casey Fossum; 49 Jason Hammel; 38 Travis Harper; 43 Chad Harville; 30 Mark Hendrickson; 39 J. P. Howell; 36 Edwin Jackson; 26 Scott Kazmir; 68,45 Ruddy Lugo; 37 Seth McClung; 46 Brian Meadows; 33 Dan Miceli; 54 Chad Orvella; 53 Juan Salas; 98 Jae Weong Seo; 50 James Shields; 41 Brian Stokes; 52 Jon Switzer; 40 Doug Waechter; 51 Tyler Walker	Catchers: 44 Toby Hall; 30 Dioner Navarro; 8 Josh Paul; 32 Shawn Riggans; Infielders: 24 Sean Burroughs; 3 Jorge Cantú; 18 Nick Green; 19 Aubrey Huff; 16 Travis Lee; 23 Julio Lugo; 62,10 Luis Ordaz; 9 Tomás Pérez; 2 B. J. Upton; 21 Ty Wigginton; 24 Kevin Witt; 18 Ben Zobrist	Outfielders: 5 Rocco Baldelli; 29 Russell Branyan; 13 Carl Crawford; 4 Joey Gathright; 31 Jonny Gomes; 27 Damon Hollins; 14 Greg Norton; 35 Delmon Young	Manager: 70 Joe Maddon; Coaches: 48 Mike Butcher (pitching); 20 Bill Evers (bench); 6 Tom Foley (third base); 55 Steve Henderson (hitting); 25 George Hendrick (first base); 7 Bobby Ramos (bullpen); 58 Don Zimmer (senior advisor)

== Player stats ==
=== Batting ===
==== Starters by position ====
Note: Pos = Position; G = Games played; AB = At bats; H = Hits; Avg. = Batting average; HR = Home runs; RBI = Runs batted in

Pos	Player	G	AB	H	Avg.	HR	RBI
C	Toby Hall	64	221	51	.231	8	23
1B	Travis Lee	114	343	77	.224	11	31
2B	Jorge Cantú	107	413	103	.249	14	62
SS	Julio Lugo	73	289	89	.308	12	27
3B	Aubrey Huff	63	230	65	.283	8	28
LF	Carl Crawford	151	600	183	.305	18	77
CF	Rocco Baldelli	92	364	110	.302	16	57
RF	Damon Hollins	121	333	76	.228	15	33
DH	Jonny Gomes	117	385	83	.216	20	59

==== Other batters ====
Note: G = Games played; AB = At bats; H = Hits; Avg. = Batting average; HR = Home runs; RBI = Runs batted in

Player	G	AB	H	Avg.	HR	RBI
Ty Wigginton	122	444	122	.275	24	79
Greg Norton	98	294	87	.296	17	45
Tomás Pérez	99	241	51	.212	2	16
Dioner Navarro	56	193	47	.244	4	20
Ben Zobrist	52	183	41	.224	2	18
B.J. Upton	50	175	43	.246	1	10
Russell Branyan	64	169	34	.201	12	27
Joey Gathright	55	154	31	.201	0	13
Josh Paul	58	146	38	.260	1	8
Delmon Young	30	126	40	.317	3	10
Kevin Witt	19	61	9	.148	2	5
Nick Green	17	39	3	.077	0	0
Shawn Riggans	10	29	5	.172	0	1
Sean Burroughs	8	21	4	.190	0	1
Luis Ordaz	1	2	0	.000	0	0

=== Pitching ===
==== Starting pitchers ====
Note: G = Games pitched; IP = Innings pitched; W = Wins; L = Losses; ERA = Earned run average; SO = Strikeouts

Player	G	IP	W	L	ERA	SO
Scott Kazmir	24	144.2	10	8	3.24	163
Casey Fossum	25	130.0	6	6	5.33	88
James Shields	21	124.2	6	8	4.84	104
Tim Corcoran	21	90.1	5	9	4.38	59
Jae Weong Seo	17	90.0	1	8	5.00	39
Mark Hendrickson	13	89.2	4	8	3.81	51
Doug Waechter	11	53.0	1	4	6.62	25
Jason Hammel	9	44.0	0	6	7.77	32
J.P. Howell	8	42.1	1	3	5.10	33
Brian Stokes	5	24.0	1	0	4.88	15

==== Other pitchers ====
Note: G = Games pitched; IP = Innings pitched; W = Wins; L = Losses; ERA = Earned run average; SO = Strikeouts

Player	G	IP	W	L	ERA	SO
Seth McClung	39	103.0	6	12	6.29	59

==== Relief pitchers ====
Note: G = Games pitched; W = Wins; L = Losses; SV = Saves; ERA = Earned run average; SO = Strikeouts

Player	G	W	L	SV	ERA	SO
Tyler Walker	20	1	3	10	4.95	16
Shawn Camp	75	7	4	4	4.68	53
Ruddy Lugo	64	2	4	0	3.81	48
Brian Meadows	53	3	6	8	5.17	35
Jon Switzer	40	2	2	0	4.54	18
Dan Miceli	33	1	2	4	3.94	18
Chad Harville	32	0	2	1	5.93	30
Travis Harper	30	2	0	0	4.93	32
Edwin Jackson	23	0	0	0	5.45	27
Chad Orvella	22	1	5	0	7.40	17
Juan Salas	8	0	0	0	5.40	8
Scott Dunn	7	1	0	0	11.74	4
Jason Childers	5	0	1	0	4.70	5
Jesús Colomé	1	0	0	0	27.00	0

== Farm system ==
Level	Team	League	Manager
AAA	Durham Bulls	International League	John Tamargo
AA	Montgomery Biscuits	Southern League	Charlie Montoyo
A	Visalia Oaks	California League	Joe Szekely
A	Southwest Michigan Devil Rays	Midwest League	Skeeter Barnes
A-Short Season	Hudson Valley Renegades	New York–Penn League	Matt Quatraro
Rookie	Princeton Devil Rays	Appalachian League	Jamie Nelson

LEAGUE CHAMPIONS: Montgomery
