= 2005 Tampa Bay Devil Rays season =

2005 Tampa Bay Devil Rays
- League: American League
- Division: East
- Ballpark: Tropicana Field
- City: St. Petersburg, Florida
- Record: 67–95 (.414)
- Divisional place: 5th
- Owners: Vince Naimoli
- General managers: Chuck LaMar
- Managers: Lou Piniella
- Television: FSN Florida; WXPX (Joe Magrane, Dewayne Staats, Todd Kalas, Dick Crippin)
- Radio: WHNZ (Rich Herrera, Dave Wills, Andy Freed); WZHR (Jose Anzola, Enrique Oliu)

The 2005 Tampa Bay Devil Rays season was the team's eighth since the franchise was created. This season, they finished last in the American League East, and managed to finish the season with the AL's third-worst record of 67–95. Their manager was Lou Piniella who entered his third and last season with the Devil Rays.

== Offseason ==
- October 15, 2004: Midre Cummings was released by the Tampa Bay Devil Rays.
- January 12, 2005: Alex Gonzalez was signed as a free agent with the Tampa Bay Devil Rays.
- February 7, 2005: Denny Neagle was signed as a free agent with the Tampa Bay Devil Rays.
- April 4, 2005: Charles Johnson was signed as a free agent by the Devil Rays.

== Regular season ==
=== Season standings ===
AL East
Team	W	L	Pct.	GB	Home	Road
New York Yankees	95	67	.586	—	53‍–‍28	42‍–‍39
Boston Red Sox	95	67	.586	—	54‍–‍27	41‍–‍40
Toronto Blue Jays	80	82	.494	15	43‍–‍38	37‍–‍44
Baltimore Orioles	74	88	.457	21	36‍–‍45	38‍–‍43
Tampa Bay Devil Rays	67	95	.414	28	40‍–‍41	27‍–‍54

=== Record vs. opponents ===
2005 American League record Source: MLB Standings Grid – 2005
Team	BAL	BOS	CWS	CLE	DET	KC	LAA	MIN	NYY	OAK	SEA	TB	TEX	TOR	NL
Baltimore	—	8–10	2–6	1–6	3–5	4–2	2–4	3–3	7–11	4–6	7–3	12–6	4–6	9–10	8–10
Boston	10–8	—	4–3	4–2	6–4	4–2	6–4	4–2	9–10	6–4	3–3	13–6	7–2	7–11	12–6
Chicago	6–2	3–4	—	14–5	14–5	13–5	4–6	11–7	3–3	2–7	6–3	4–2	3–6	4–2	12–6
Cleveland	6–1	2–4	5–14	—	12–6	13–6	3–5	10–9	3–4	6–3	7–3	4–6	3–3	4–2	15–3
Detroit	5–3	4–6	5–14	6–12	—	10–9	4–6	8–11	1–5	1–5	5–4	5–2	4–2	4–3	9–9
Kansas City	2–4	2–4	5–13	6–13	9–10	—	2–7	6–13	3–3	2–4	2–7	3–5	2–8	3–6	9–9
Los Angeles	4–2	4–6	6–4	5–3	6–4	7–2	—	6–4	6–4	10–9	9–9	4–5	15–4	1–5	12–6
Minnesota	3–3	2–4	7–11	9–10	11–8	13–6	4–6	—	3–3	4–6	6–4	6–0	3–6	4–2	8–10
New York	11–7	10–9	3–3	4–3	5–1	3–3	4–6	3–3	—	7–2	7–3	8–11	7–3	12–6	11–7
Oakland	6–4	4–6	7–2	3–6	5–1	4–2	9–10	6–4	2–7	—	12–6	4–5	11–8	5–5	10–8
Seattle	3–7	3–3	3–6	3–7	4–5	7–2	9–9	4–6	3–7	6–12	—	4–2	6–13	4–6	10–8
Tampa Bay	6–12	6–13	2–4	6–4	2–5	5–3	5–4	0–6	11–8	5–4	2–4	—	6–2	8–11	3–15
Texas	6–4	2–7	6–3	3–3	2–4	8–2	4–15	6–3	3–7	8–11	13–6	2–6	—	7–3	9–9
Toronto	10–9	11–7	2–4	2–4	3–4	6–3	5–1	2–4	6–12	5–5	6–4	11–8	3–7	—	8–10

=== Notable transactions ===
- June 13, 2005: Charles Johnson was released by the Devil Rays.

=== Roster ===
2005 Tampa Bay Devil Rays
Roster
Pitchers: 28 Danys Báez; 97 Joe Beimel; 41 Rob Bell; 48 Joe Borowski; 45 Dewon Brazelton; 38 Lance Carter; 49 Jesús Colomé; 56 Tim Corcoran; 15 Casey Fossum; 52 Lee Gardner; 58 Travis Harper; 30 Mark Hendrickson; 26 Scott Kazmir; 37 Seth McClung; 51 Trever Miller; 11,99 Hideo Nomo; 47 Franklin Núñez; 54 Chad Orvella; 48 Jon Switzer; 40 Doug Waechter; 53 John Webb	Catchers: 17 Kevin Cash; 44 Toby Hall; 24 Charles Johnson; 39 Pete Laforest; 36 Tim Laker; Infielders: 3 Jorge Cantú; 2 Fernando Cortez; 8 Alex Gonzalez; 18 Nick Green; 16 Travis Lee; 23 Julio Lugo; 24 Eric Munson; 33 Eduardo Pérez; 21 Josh Phelps	Outfielders: 13 Carl Crawford; 1 Joey Gathright; 31 Jonny Gomes; 27 Damon Hollins; 19 Aubrey Huff; 2 Alex Sánchez; 10 Chris Singleton; 29 Reggie Taylor	Manager: 14 Lou Piniella; Coaches: 4 Lee Elia (hitting); 6 Tom Foley (third base); 22 Billy Hatcher (first base); 55 Chuck Hernandez (pitching); 7 John McLaren (bench); 15 Matt Sinatro (bullpen); 56 Don Zimmer (advisor)

== Player stats ==
=== Batting ===
==== Starters by position ====
Note: Pos = Position; G = Games played; AB = At bats; H = Hits; Avg. = Batting average; HR = Home runs; RBI = Runs batted in

Pos	Player	G	AB	H	Avg.	HR	RBI
C	Toby Hall	135	432	124	.287	5	48
1B	Travis Lee	129	404	110	.272	12	49
2B	Nick Green	111	318	76	.239	5	29
SS	Julio Lugo	158	616	182	.295	6	57
3B	Alex Gonzalez	109	349	94	.269	9	38
LF	Carl Crawford	156	644	194	.301	15	81
CF	Damon Hollins	120	342	85	.249	13	46
RF	Aubrey Huff	154	575	150	.261	22	92
DH	Jonny Gomes	101	348	98	.282	21	54

==== Other batters ====
Note: G = Games played; AB = At bats; H = Hits; Avg. = Batting average; HR = Home runs; RBI = Runs batted in

Player	G	AB	H	Avg.	HR	RBI
Jorge Cantú	150	598	171	.286	28	117
Joey Gathright	76	203	56	.276	0	13
Eduardo Pérez	77	161	41	.255	11	28
Josh Phelps	47	158	42	.266	5	26
Alex Sánchez	43	133	46	.346	2	13
Pete LaForest	25	64	11	.172	1	4
Chris Singleton	28	59	16	.271	0	11
Charles Johnson	19	46	9	.196	0	5
Kevin Cash	13	31	5	.161	2	2
Reggie Taylor	11	22	4	.182	0	1
Eric Munson	11	18	3	.167	0	2
Fernando Cortez	8	13	1	.077	0	1
Tim Laker	1	1	0	.000	0	0

=== Pitching ===
==== Starting pitchers ====
Note: G = Games pitched; IP = Innings pitched; W = Wins; L = Losses; ERA = Earned run average; SO = Strikeouts

Player	G	IP	W	L	ERA	SO
Scott Kazmir	32	186.0	10	9	3.77	174
Mark Hendrickson	31	178.1	11	8	5.90	89
Doug Waechter	29	157.0	5	12	5.62	87
Hideo Nomo	19	100.2	5	8	7.24	59
John Webb	1	4.0	0	1	18.00	2

==== Other pitchers ====
Note: G = Games pitched; IP = Innings pitched; W = Wins; L = Losses; ERA = Earned run average; SO = Strikeouts

Player	G	IP	W	L	ERA	SO
Casey Fossum	36	162.2	8	12	4.92	128
Seth McClung	34	109.1	7	11	6.59	92
Dewon Brazelton	20	71.0	1	8	7.61	43
Rob Bell	8	25.0	1	1	8.28	13
Tim Corcoran	10	22.2	0	0	5.96	13

==== Relief pitchers ====
Note: G = Games pitched; W = Wins; L = Losses; SV = Saves; ERA = Earned run average; SO = Strikeouts

Player	G	IP	W	L	SV	ERA	SO
Danys Báez	67	72.1	5	4	41	2.86	51
Trever Miller	61	44.1	2	2	0	4.06	35
Travis Harper	52	73.1	4	6	0	6.75	40
Lance Carter	39	57.0	1	2	1	4.89	22
Chad Orvella	37	50.0	3	3	1	3.60	43
Jesús Colomé	36	45.1	2	3	0	4.57	28
Joe Borowski	32	35.1	1	5	0	3.82	16
Joe Beimel	7	11.0	0	0	0	3.27	3
Lee Gardner	5	7.1	0	0	0	4.91	4
Franklin Núñez	5	5.0	1	0	0	10.80	2
Jon Switzer	2	4.0	0	0	0	6.75	5

== Farm system ==
Level	Team	League	Manager
AAA	Durham Bulls	International League	Bill Evers
AA	Montgomery Biscuits	Southern League	Charlie Montoyo
A	Visalia Oaks	California League	Steve Livesey
A	Southwest Michigan Devil Rays	Midwest League	Joe Szekely
A-Short Season	Hudson Valley Renegades	New York–Penn League	Dave Howard
Rookie	Princeton Devil Rays	Appalachian League	Jamie Nelson
