= Ryu Jae-kuk =

South Korean baseball player (born 1983)

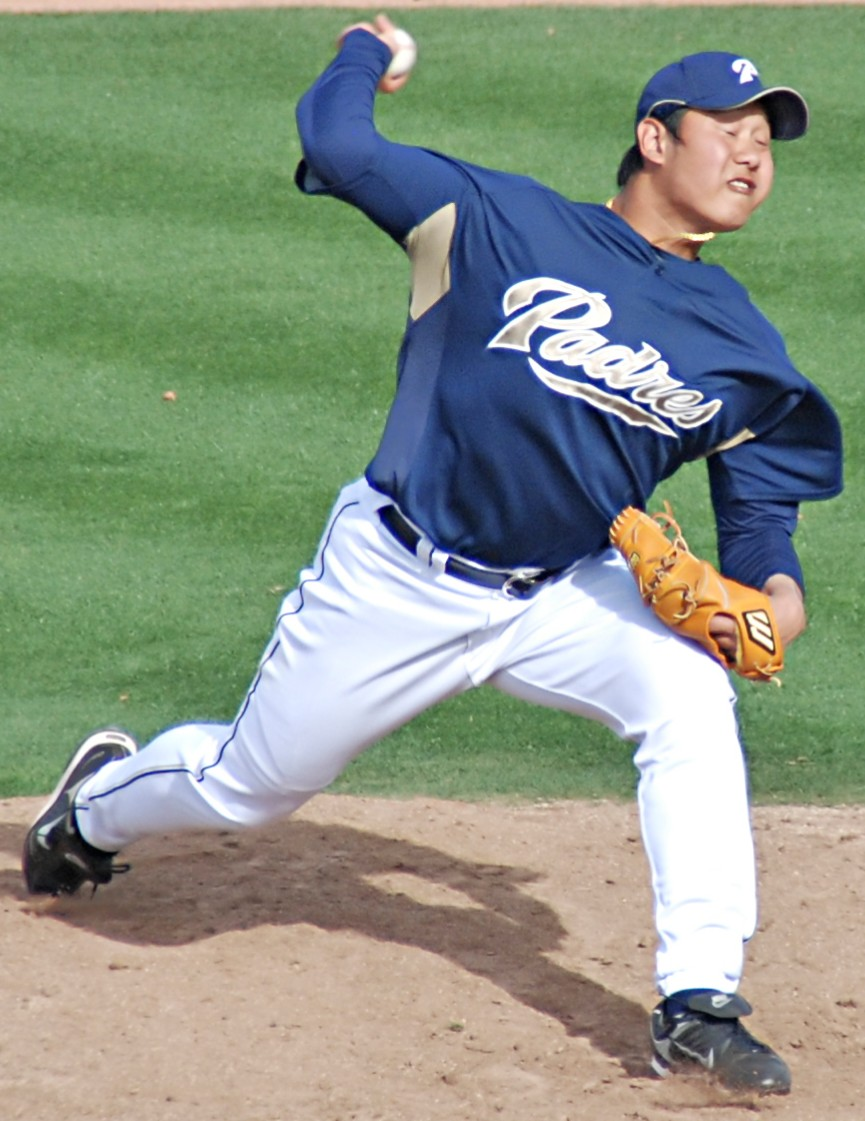
- Ryu pitching for the San Diego Padres
- Pitcher
- Born: May 30, 1983 (age 43); Seoul, South Korea
- Batted: Right Threw: Right

Professional debut
- MLB: May 14, 2006, for the Chicago Cubs
- KBO: May 19, 2013, for the LG Twins

Last appearance
- MLB: April 9, 2008, for the Tampa Bay Rays
- KBO: 2019, for the LG Twins

MLB statistics
- Win–loss: 1–3
- Earned run average: 7.49
- Strikeouts: 32

KBO statistics
- Win–loss: 46–36
- Earned run average: 4.58
- Strikeouts: 571
- Stats at Baseball Reference

Teams
- Chicago Cubs (2006); Tampa Bay Devil Rays / Rays (2007–2008); LG Twins (2013–2019)

- Ryu Jae-kuk
- Hangul: 류제국
- Hanja: 柳濟國
- RR: Ryu Jeguk
- MR: Ryu Cheguk

Ryu Jae-kuk (Korean: 류제국; Hanja: 柳済國; Korean pronunciation: [ɾju.dʑe̞.ɡuk]; born May 30, 1983, in Seoul, South Korea), also known as Jae Kuk Ryu, is a former professional baseball pitcher. He played in Major League Baseball (MLB) for the Chicago Cubs and Tampa Bay Rays and in the KBO League for the LG Twins.

== Professional career ==
Ryu signed with the Chicago Cubs as an undrafted free agent on June 1, 2001. Ryu made headlines on April 23, 2003, when he knocked an osprey from its perch by throwing a baseball at it at Jackie Robinson Ballpark in Daytona Beach before a game in the Single-A Florida State League causing it to die 6 days later. He faced a fine for the incident.

Ryu made his major league debut with the Chicago Cubs on May 14, 2006, in a relief appearance against the San Diego Padres. He made his first major league start on May 28, 2006, in which he threw only 28 pitches before being relieved after having allowed 6 runs in 1 1/3 innings pitched. He was sent back to the minor leagues almost immediately afterwards. He would go on to make the 2006 MLB Futures Team. He would return to the Cubs for late August and September making several bullpen appearances, faring slightly better and finishing the year with an 8.40 ERA. Ryu was traded to the Tampa Bay Devil Rays on February 14, 2007, in exchange for minor leaguers. He made the Devil Rays' active roster, and began the season in the bullpen.

On January 15, 2009, Ryu was claimed off waivers by the San Diego Padres. On March 26, 2009, Ryu was claimed off waivers by the Cleveland Indians. However, Major League Baseball declined the waiver claim on April 1, and Ryu was returned to the Padres, then released.

On January 24, 2010, it was reported that Ryu had signed with the Texas Rangers.

On January 30, 2013, Ryu, joined the LG Twins of the KBO League. On August 23, 2019, Ryu announced his retirement from baseball, citing a nagging back injury. In 6 seasons with the Twins, Ryu pitched to a 46–37 record and 4.66 ERA in 136 appearances.
