= Fernando Cortez =

American baseball player (born 1981)

- Infielder
- Born: August 10, 1981 (age 44); Stockton, California
- Batted: Left Threw: Right

MLB debut
- July 5, 2005, for the Tampa Bay Devil Rays

Last MLB appearance
- July 3, 2007, for the Kansas City Royals

MLB statistics
- Batting average: .185
- Home runs: 0
- Runs batted in: 2
- Stats at Baseball Reference

Former teams
- Tampa Bay Devil Rays (2005); Kansas City Royals (2007)

Fernando Cortez (born August 10, 1981) is an American former professional baseball infielder. He played in Major League Baseball (MLB) for the Tampa Bay Devil Rays and the Kansas City Royals.

== Career ==
=== Tampa Bay Rays ===
Cortez was selected by the Tampa Bay Devil Rays in the 9th round of the 2001 Major League Baseball draft. He began his professional career that year for the Hudson Valley Renegades. He received a promotion to the Charleston RiverDogs in 2002, where he would spend the season. In 2003, he played for the high-A Bakersfield Blaze and the AA Orlando Rays. In 2004, he remained in AA for the Montgomery Biscuits. He began 2005 in Montgomery before receiving a promotion to the AAA Durham Bulls.He saw his first Major League action with the Devil Rays in 2005, serving as a utility infielder in his limited time with the club after making his debut on July 5, 2005.

=== Kansas City Royals ===
On June 20, 2006, Cortez, along with outfielder Joey Gathright, was traded to Kansas City for left-handed pitcher J.P. Howell. Cortez was assigned to the roster of the Triple-A Omaha Royals and did not play in the majors with Kansas City in 2006. In 2007, Cortez saw limited action with Kansas City, appearing in eight games. His 2007 campaign with the Royals resulted in a .286 batting average four hits in 14 at-bats, with one RBI and three runs scored. Kansas City designated him for assignment on July 11.

=== Chicago White Sox ===
Cortez signed with the Chicago White Sox for the 2008 season and was assigned to the AAA Charlotte Knights. He played in 104 games in Charlotte, hitting .262/.296/.341 to go along with 93 hits. He became a free agent after the season.

=== Second Stint with Tampa Bay Rays ===
On April 20, 2009, Cortez signed a minor league contract with the Tampa Bay Rays and was assigned to the AA Montgomery Biscuits. He spent the entire year in Montgomery and elected free agency on November 9, 2009. On June 5, 2010, Cortez resigned with the Rays organization.

=== Second Stint with Chicago White Sox ===
On June 29, 2010, Cortez signed with the Chicago White Sox organization and was assigned to the Charlotte Knights. On November 6, 2010, Cortez elected free agency.

=== Somerset Patriots ===
Cortez signed with the Somerset Patriots of the Atlantic League of Professional Baseball for the 2011 season. Cortez played in 113 games for Somerset in 2011, carrying a .290/.341/.371 batting line and 125 hits. He became a free agent at seasons end.
