= Brian Stokes =

American baseball player (born 1979)

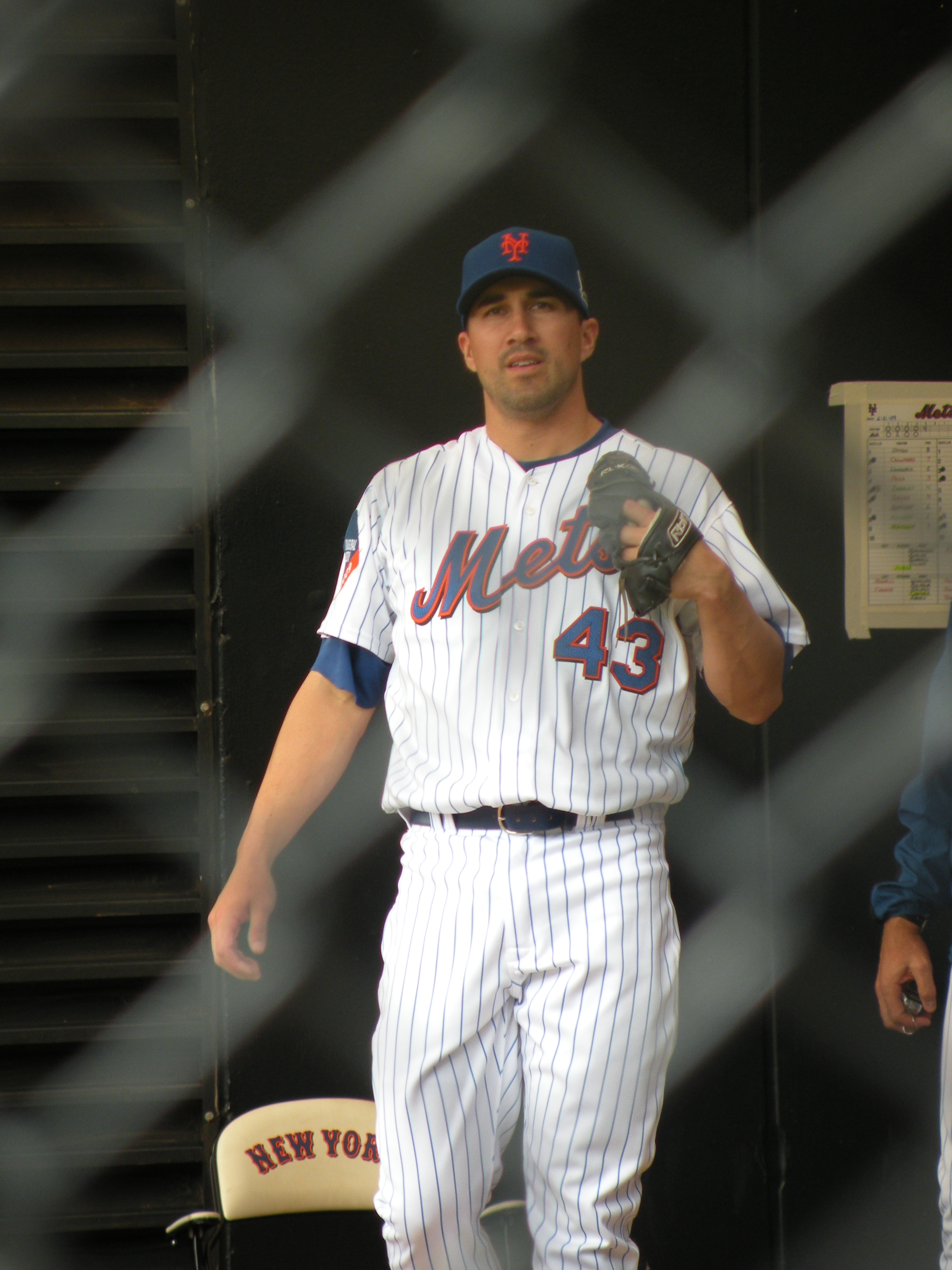
- Stokes with the New York Mets
- Pitcher
- Born: September 7, 1979 (age 46); Montclair, California, U.S.
- Batted: Right Threw: Right

MLB debut
- September 3, 2006, for the Tampa Bay Devil Rays

Last MLB appearance
- September 3, 2010, for the Los Angeles Angels of Anaheim

MLB statistics
- Win–loss record: 6–11
- Earned run average: 5.27
- Strikeouts: 137
- Stats at Baseball Reference

Teams
- Tampa Bay Devil Rays (2006–2007); New York Mets (2008–2009); Los Angeles Angels of Anaheim (2010)

Brian Alexander Stokes (born September 7, 1979) is an American former professional baseball pitcher. He played in Major League Baseball (MLB) for the Tampa Bay Devil Rays, New York Mets, and Los Angeles Angels of Anaheim.

== Early life ==
Stokes was born in Montclair, California, and graduated from Jurupa Valley High School. He played college baseball at Riverside Community College in California.

== Career ==
=== Tampa Bay Devil Rays ===
On October 2, 1998, Stokes was signed as an amateur free agent by the Tampa Bay Devil Rays. He spent his first professional season with the Princeton Devil Rays in 1999. While with Princeton, Stokes led the Appalachian League in games finished with 35. He pitched for the Single-A Charleston RiverDogs in 2000, allowing one home run in 70 1/3 innings pitched. Stokes pitched his first complete game at Mudville on June 23, 2001, but lost the game. He played for the Bakersfield Blaze during the 2002 season, leading the team in wins (10) and strikeouts (154). Stokes threw his first professional shutout on July 14 against the San Jose Giants. Stokes started ten games for the Double-A Orlando Rays before undergoing Tommy John surgery in 2003, resulting in his missing the entire 2004 season. In 2005, Stokes pitched for both the Single-A Visalia Oaks and Double-A Montgomery Biscuits. A hamstring injury sidelined him for the month of July.

Stokes was recalled from the Triple-A Durham on September 2, 2005. Stokes made his major league debut on September 3, 2006. In 2007, Brian's 59 appearances were fourth among American League rookies.

=== New York Mets ===
On November 28, 2007, Stokes was sent from Tampa Bay to the New York Mets in exchange for cash considerations and was added to the Mets' 40-man roster. During spring training on the last day, he was designated for assignment. He started the season with the Mets Triple-A affiliate, the New Orleans Zephyrs. He was called up to the Mets on August 9, 2008, to start in place of injured starting pitcher, John Maine.

=== Los Angeles Angels ===
On January 22, 2010, Stokes was traded to the Los Angeles Angels of Anaheim in exchange for Gary Matthews, Jr. He was released by the Angels on September 7, after making 16 appearances with an 8.10 ERA.

=== Camden Riversharks ===
On December 21, 2010, Stokes signed a minor league contract with the Toronto Blue Jays that included an invitation to spring training. On February 14, 2011, Stokes' contract was voided by the Blue Jays "due to the results of his physical".

On April 9, 2011, Stokes signed with the Camden Riversharks of the Atlantic League of Professional Baseball. He made 31 appearances (one start) for Camden, compiling a 2-3 record and 3.47 ERA with 23 strikeouts and 11 saves across 36 1/3 innings pitched.

=== Arizona Diamondbacks ===
On August 1, 2011, Stokes signed a minor league contract with the Arizona Diamondbacks; he was assigned to the Triple-A Reno Aces. He became a free agent following the season on November 2.
