= Shawn Riggans =

American baseball player (born 1980)

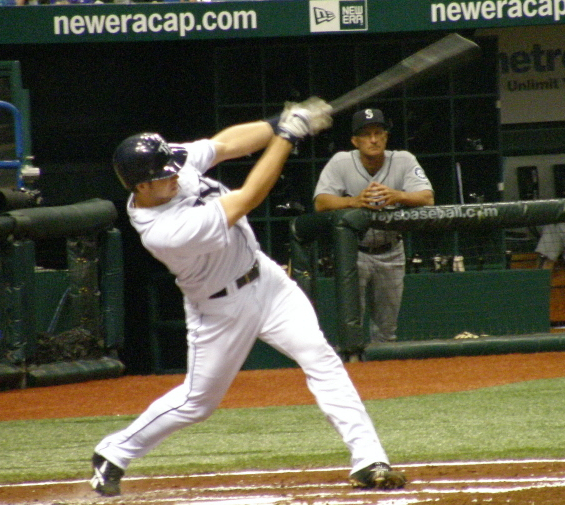
- Riggans with the Tampa Bay Rays
- Catcher
- Born: July 25, 1980 (age 46); Fort Lauderdale, Florida, U.S.
- Batted: Right Threw: Right

MLB debut
- September 5, 2006, for the Tampa Bay Devil Rays

Last MLB appearance
- October 4, 2009, for the Tampa Bay Rays

MLB statistics
- Batting average: .202
- Home runs: 7
- Runs batted in: 28
- Stats at Baseball Reference

Teams
- Tampa Bay Devil Rays / Tampa Bay Rays (2006–2009)

Shawn Willis Riggans (born July 25, 1980) is an American former professional baseball catcher. He played in Major League Baseball (MLB) from 2006 to 2009 for the Tampa Bay Rays.

== Amateur career ==
Riggans was born in Fort Lauderdale, Florida to John and Patricia Riggans. He played for St. Thomas Aquinas High School as a reserve player, in part to his small size, and upon entering college at Florida International University he was initially rejected from the team. After performing well during a subsequent opportunity he earned a spot on the roster. Receiving more experience following a transfer to Indian River Community College Riggans was noticed and drafted in the 24th round (706th overall) of the 2000 MLB draft by the Tampa Bay Devil Rays.

== Career ==
=== Tampa Bay Devil Rays / Tampa Bay Rays ===
==== Minor leagues ====
In his first season in the Rays' organization, Riggans hit .345 with 8 home runs in 15 games for the rookie–level Princeton Devil Rays. He earned the Rays' minor league defensive catcher of the year award four times. He would spend a total of six seasons in the Rays' minor league system before being called up as part of the September roster expansion in 2006.

==== Major Leagues ====
Riggans' major league debut came on September 5, 2006, when Rays manager Joe Maddon pinch hit Riggans for Rocco Baldelli in the ninth inning of a game against the Minnesota Twins; he proceeded to get a hit to center field. He would finish the remainder of the season with five hits in 29 at–bats over 10 games.

After appearing in only three games in the 2007 season, Riggans' most significant season came in 2008, appearing in 44 games and hitting a .222 average with six home runs and 24 runs batted in while serving as the back up catcher to Dioner Navarro. The Rays would win the American League pennant that year, defeating the Chicago White Sox in the American League Division Series and the Boston Red Sox in the American League Championship Series, before falling to the Philadelphia Phillies in the 2008 World Series. Though Riggans made the postseason roster, he did not appear in any games during any of the series.

Riggans would again receive some playing time at the major league level in 2009, appearing in seven games for the club.

=== New York Mets ===
On February 11, 2010, Riggans signed a minor league contract with the New York Mets. In 4 games split between the Double–A Binghamton Mets and Triple–A Buffalo Bisons, he went 3–for–10 (.300) with 2 RBI. Riggans was released by the Mets organization on May 11.

=== New Jersey Jackals ===
After being released by the Mets, Riggans signed with the New Jersey Jackals of the independent Can-Am League. In 34 games for the Jackals, Riggans slashed .328/.414/.492 with four home runs and 26 RBI.

=== Milwaukee Brewers ===
On December 10, 2010, Riggans signed a minor league contract with the Milwaukee Brewers organization. He played in 7 games for the Double–A Huntsville Stars in 2011, going 1–for–6 (.167) with 1 walk. Riggans was granted free agency at the end of the year.

== Personal life ==
Riggans' mother died while in need of a liver transplant in 2001. He would subsequently say a prayer to his mother during the national anthem prior to the start of each game. Shawn is married to Aimee Guevara since November 1, 2013. They have 2 children and a French Bulldog.
