= Juan Salas =

Dominican baseball player (born 1978)

- Relief pitcher
- Born: November 7, 1978 (age 47); Santo Domingo, Dominican Republic
- Batted: Right Threw: Right

MLB debut
- September 5, 2006, for the Tampa Bay Devil Rays

Last appearance
- September 15, 2008, for the Tampa Bay Rays

MLB statistics
- Win–loss record: 1–1
- Earned run average: 4.44
- Strikeouts: 42
- Stats at Baseball Reference

Teams
- Tampa Bay Rays (2006–2008)

Juan Salas (born November 7, 1978) is a Dominican professional baseball relief pitcher. Salas signed with Tampa Bay on July 8, 1998, as an amateur free agent, and made his Major League debut September 5, 2006.

Salas is notable for being converted from playing third base to pitching while in the Devil Rays' minor league system. Salas became a pitcher in the 2004 season and had a 1-0 record and 4.82 ERA for the Rookie-Level Princeton Devil Rays. He split the 2005 season between the High-A Visalia Oaks and the Double-A Montgomery Biscuits.

The 2006 season was the breakout year in Salas' minor-league career; he gave up no earned runs in 23 games for Montgomery, earned 14 saves, and struck out 52 batters in 34 2/3 innings. This earned him an appearance in the 2006 All-Star Futures Game for the World Team. He finished off a no hitter started by Jason Hammel on July 17, 2006, beating the Columbus Clippers 4-1. He was called up to the Triple-A Durham Bulls, with whom he went 1-1 with a 1.57 ERA and three saves in 27 games, striking out 33 batters in 28 2/3 innings. The Devil Rays then called him up to help out their bullpen; he made eight appearances with Tampa Bay in the 2006 season and won a roster spot out of spring training with the Devil Rays in 2007. In 2007, he went 1-1 with a 3.95 ERA in 12 games and was suspended in May for 50 games for using performance-enhancing drugs. To take his place on the roster, the Devil Rays recalled Tim Corcoran from Durham.

Salas started the 2008 season on the restricted list due to problems obtaining a visa to come to the United States. He missed spring training and did not arrive in the United States until April 17, 2008, several weeks after the 2008 MLB season started. He reported to the Triple-A Durham Bulls for a rehab assignment beginning May 9.

On February 12, 2009, Salas was designated for assignment. He was traded to the Cleveland Indians on February 19, 2009 for minor league infielder Isaias Valasquez. He was released on May 6.

== See also ==
- List of sportspeople sanctioned for doping offences
