= Jon Switzer =

American baseball player (born 1979)

- Relief pitcher
- Born: August 13, 1979 (age 46); Bowling Green, Kentucky, U.S.
- Batted: Left Threw: Left

MLB debut
- August 2, 2003, for the Tampa Bay Devil Rays

Last MLB appearance
- June 22, 2009, for the New York Mets

MLB statistics
- Win–loss record: 2–4
- Earned run average: 6.20
- Strikeouts: 46
- Stats at Baseball Reference

Teams
- Tampa Bay Devil Rays (2003, 2005–2007); New York Mets (2009)

Jon Michael Switzer (born August 13, 1979) is a former Major League Baseball relief pitcher.

== Amateur career ==
=== High school ===
Switzer is a 1998 graduate of Clear Lake High School in Houston, Texas While there he was three-year letterwinner and was selected for the following honors: '98 first-team all-district, '97 second-team all-district, USA Today 1998 All-USA honorable mention, Houston Area All-Star, '98 all-state selection. He also played for the South in the Texas North/South All-Star game at The Ballpark in Arlington.

=== College ===
In 1998, Switzer was selected by the Pittsburgh Pirates in 26th round of the amateur entry draft but chose to attend Arizona State University where he majored in marketing.

Switzer attended Arizona State for three years (1999–2001) and appeared in 66 games compiling a 23–13 record with a 4.01 ERA striking out 327 batters in 303.1 innings. He posted back-to-back seasons with 100+ strikeouts in 2000 (121) and 2001 (128). He was named Pac-10 Honorable Mention in 2000 and 2001, third-team Collegiate Baseball All-American in 2000.

== Professional career ==
Switzer was selected by Tampa Bay Devil Rays in 2nd round of the 2001 Major League Baseball draft and began his professional career playing for the Hudson Valley Renegades of the New York–Penn League.

By 2003 Switzer worked his way up to the Triple-A Durham Bulls and made his first major league appearance against the Kansas City Royals on August 2, 2003.

Switzer missed the entire 2004 season with an injury. He split the 2005–2007 seasons between Durham and the parent club. On November 30, 2007, Tampa outrighted Switzer to Durham. December 1, he refused the minor league assignment and became a free agent.

On January 4, 2008, Switzer was signed by the Boston Red Sox to a minor league contract and was invited to spring training. On March 13, he was optioned to the Triple-A Pawtucket Red Sox. He became a free agent at the end of the season and signed a minor league contract with the New York Mets in January 2009.

On June 12, the Mets called him up following John Maine's placement on the Disabled List. He was designated for assignment on June 24.

On December 22, 2009, Switzer signed a minor league contract with the Houston Astros. Jon Switzer retired after the 2010 season. He went back to school, and is now currently a business manager.
