= Chad Orvella =

American baseball player (born 1980)

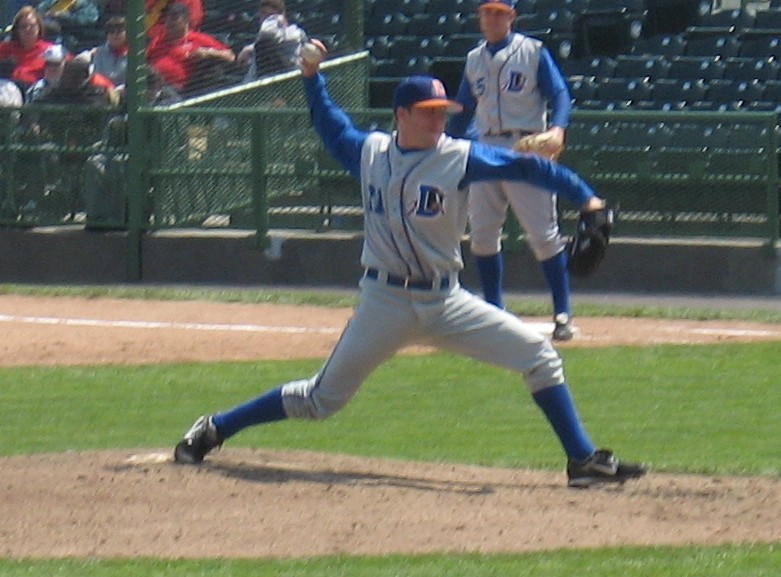
- Orvella playing for the Durham Bulls in 2007
- Pitcher
- Born: October 1, 1980 (age 45); Renton, Washington, U.S.
- Batted: Right Threw: Right

MLB debut
- May 31, 2005, for the Tampa Bay Devil Rays

Last MLB appearance
- June 8, 2007, for the Tampa Bay Devil Rays

MLB statistics
- Win–loss record: 4–10
- Earned run average: 5.79
- Strikeouts: 66
- Stats at Baseball Reference

Teams
- Tampa Bay Devil Rays (2005–2007)

Chad Robert Orvella (born October 1, 1980) is an American former Major League Baseball (MLB) relief pitcher who played for the Tampa Bay Rays from 2005 to 2007. He played collegiate baseball for Columbia Basin College and North Carolina State University as a shortstop.

== Early life ==
Chad Orvella grew up in Renton, Washington, where both of his parents were athletes; his father excelled in golf, while his mother was a tennis player. Throughout high school, Orvella participated in various sports including soccer, golf, basketball, and baseball. However, his primary focus was on baseball and golf. Orvella developed a passion for baseball at a young age, attending numerous Seattle Mariners games during his childhood and starting to play the sport at the age of 4. He attended Eastlake High School in Washington, where he played baseball at the varsity level. Upon graduation he accepted an offer continue his baseball career at Columbia Basin College.

== College experience ==
Orvella had every intention of using his time at Columbia Basin as a stepping-stone to get into a bigger Division 1 baseball program. Ultimately, he received transfer offers from Texas and almost every ACC school. Orvella chose to transfer to North Carolina State University for his junior year. In 2002, he played collegiate summer baseball for the Chatham A's of the Cape Cod Baseball League. During his senior season, MLB scouts began to scout Orvella and note that he could pitch well in addition to playing shortstop. When scouts approached him and asked him if he would enter the MLB draft as a pitcher, he said he would do anything to get to the next level. All but one interested team wanted him to pitch at the next level.

== Minor League ==
Orvella was drafted as a shortstop in the thirteenth round of the 2003 MLB draft by the Tampa Bay Devil Rays. In late 2003, after his college career was over, he reported to rookie ball in New York for the Hudson Valley Renegades. He had been preparing to play shortstop, but he was called into the managers office on the day he arrived and was told that the team wasn't sure what they would do with him. He was instructed to throw a bullpen session after the meeting. In his first game, he came in for two innings of relief and struck out five of six batters, securing his role as a pitcher. Orvella's pitching repertoire consisted of a fastball, a changeup, and a slider. He threw fifteen innings that year before tearing the lateral meniscus in his right knee. He returned in 2004. He started the year at low A level ball in Charleston, South Carolina. He made the all-star team at that level, and just after that game, was promoted to High A ball. A month later he was promoted to AA ball in California, and a month after that he was promoted to AAA ball in Durham, North Carolina. He was awarded the 2004 minor league pitcher of the year award following the year.

== Major League ==
Orvella made his major league debut on May 31, 2005, against the Oakland Athletics. He was sent back to AA after a short stint, where he would pitch thirty innings and allow only one run. He was again called up to the Devil Rays the day before Memorial Day and stayed with the MLB team for the rest of the year. He pitched so well that in 2006 he was considered the front-runner for the closer position. He pitched in AAA for two weeks before reporting back to the Devil Rays. That year he struggled to stay in MLB and went up and down between AAA and MLB. He dominated AAA hitters, but his delivery to the plate was too slow for Devil Rays manager Joe Maddon. His accuracy and effectiveness decreased when he attempted to quicken his delivery. Although he was a right handed pitcher, he stayed with the Devil Rays for half the year in 2007 as their left-handed specialist, due to their being no lefties in the bullpen and him being the most effective against left-handed hitters. Orvella hurt his shoulder during Spring Training in 2008, which ended his season. He rehabbed and spent his first half of the 2009 season with the Rays before he was released. He was picked up by The Kansas City Royals and finished his season with them. He signed with the Angels in 2010. He was never able to get his velocity back after the surgery and rehab process. Orvella would average a fastball velocity of 95 mph before the surgery, but only averaged about 85 mph after. His lone major league save came on June 12, 2005 in a Devil Rays extra inning victory over the Pirates. Orvella pitched the 13th inning, allowing 1 hit and 1 walk but no runs to close out a 7-5 Rays victory.

== Notables and life after baseball ==
In his time pitching, he had three wins over Mariano Rivera and the Yankees. His very first pitch to Derek Jeter was a home run. While in the Cape Cod leagues, there was a book written about him and his team called The Last Best League.

== Sources ==
- Personal interview with Chad Orvella via telephone.
- Orvella, C. (2015, March 29). Telephone interview
