= Tim Corcoran (pitcher) =

American baseball player (born 1978)

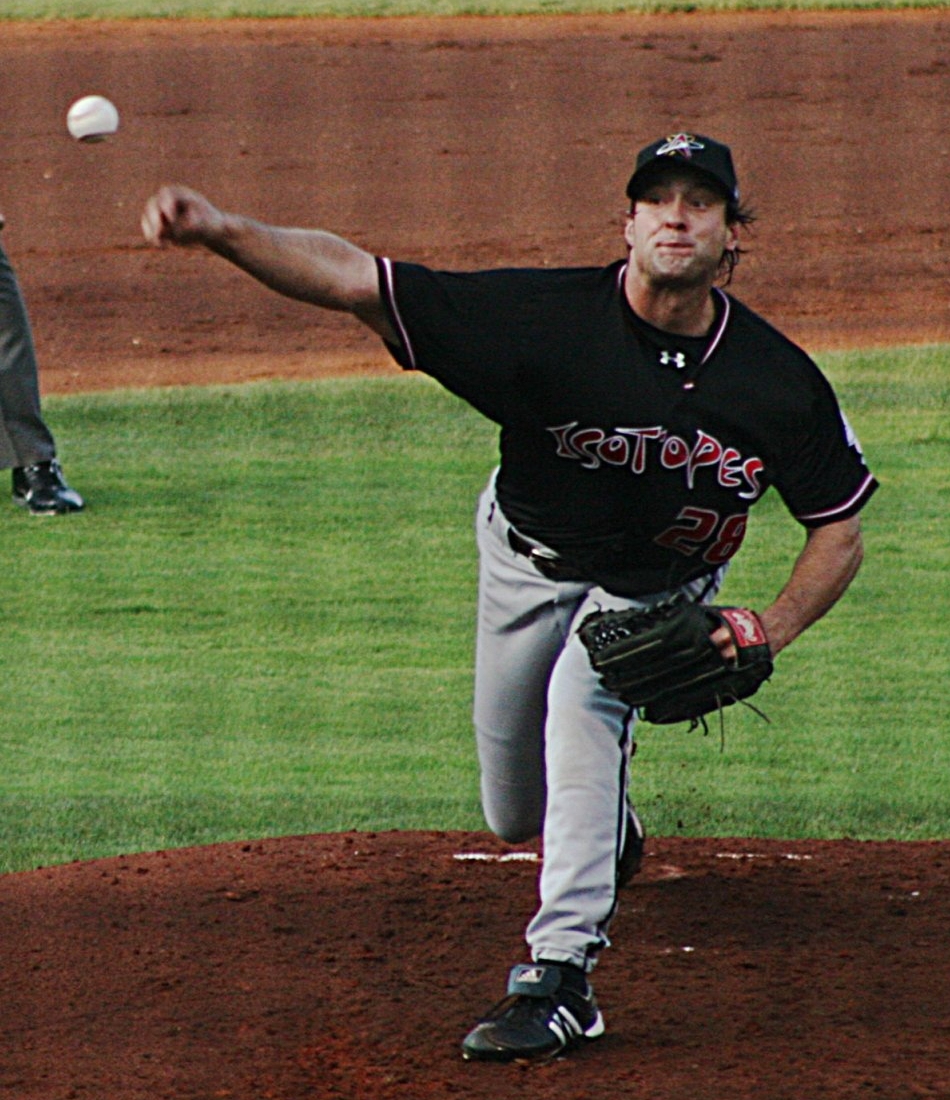
- Corcoran pitching for the Albuquerque Isotopes, Triple-A affiliates of the Los Angeles Dodgers, in 2010
- Pitcher
- Born: April 15, 1978 (age 47); Baton Rouge, Louisiana, U.S.
- Batted: Right Threw: Right

Professional debut
- MLB: June 14, 2005, for the Tampa Bay Devil Rays
- NPB: July 5, 2013, for the Yokohama DeNA BayStars

Last appearance
- MLB: June 8, 2007, for the Tampa Bay Devil Rays
- NPB: September 30, 2013, for the Yokohama DeNA BayStars

MLB statistics
- Win–loss record: 5–9
- Earned run average: 4.97
- Strikeouts: 78

NPB statistics
- Win–loss record: 1–3
- Earned run average: 5.61
- Strikeouts: 14
- Stats at Baseball Reference

Teams
- Tampa Bay Devil Rays (2005–2007); Yokohama DeNA BayStars (2013)

Timothy Hugh Corcoran (born April 15, 1978) is an American former professional baseball pitcher. He played in Major League Baseball (MLB) for the Tampa Bay Devil Rays and in Nippon Professional Baseball (NPB) for the Yokohama DeNA BayStars. Corcoran's brother, Roy Corcoran, also played professional baseball

== Professional career ==
=== New York Mets ===
Corcoran was selected by the New York Mets in the 44th round of the 1996 MLB draft out of Jackson High School. He began his professional career with the Kingsport Mets in 1997 and played in the Mets farm system through 2000. He played with Kingsport (1997), the Gulf Coast Mets (1997), and St. Lucie Mets (1998) but spent most of his time with the Capital City Bombers.

=== Baltimore Orioles ===
On December 11, 2000, he was selected from the Mets by the Baltimore Orioles in the minor league portion of the Rule 5 draft. He remained with the Orioles farm system through 2003, mostly with the Double-A Bowie Baysox.

=== Tampa Bay Devil Rays ===
In December 2003, he was once more selected in the minor league portion of the Rule 5 draft, this time by the Tampa Bay Devil Rays. The Devil Rays assigned him to the AAA Durham Bulls for 2004 and 2005.

Corcoran made his Major League debut on June 14, 2005 for the Devil Rays against the Milwaukee Brewers, working two scoreless innings of relief.

He went into 2006 spring training looking to stay in the majors, but was sent down to Triple-A to begin the season and not recalled until June 15 (due to an injury to closer Tyler Walker). He appeared in three relief appearances before getting a spot start in place of recently demoted Seth McClung. He pitched well enough to remain in the rotation, going 5–9 with a 4.38 ERA in 16 starts and 5 relief appearances.

He started the 2007 season with Triple-A Durham and was recalled by the Devil Rays after Juan Salas received a 50-game suspension following a positive drug test. On June 11, 2007, however, Corcoran was optioned back to the minors.

=== Florida Marlins ===
On Jan. 4, 2008, he signed a minor league deal with the Florida Marlins, and spent most of the year playing for their Double-A team, the Carolina Mudcats.

=== Los Angeles Dodgers ===
On March 10, 2010, Corcoran signed a minor league contract with the Los Angeles Dodgers. With the Dodgers, he played for the AA Chattanooga Lookouts and AAA Albuquerque Isotopes. He spent the entire 2011 season on the disabled list for Albuquerque after undergoing Tommy John surgery on his elbow. He became a free agent following the season on November 2.

He re-signed a minor league contract with the Dodgers on January 20. He was released on March 6.

=== Delfines de Ciudad del Carmen ===
On April 20, 2012, Corcoran signed with the Delfines de Ciudad del Carmen of the Mexican League. He was released on August 23. He appeared in 16 games (14 starts) throwing 93.2 innings going 7-4 with a 2.50 ERA and 74 strikeouts also throwing one complete game.

=== Los Angeles Dodgers (second stint) ===
On August 24, 2012, Corcoran signed a minor league contract with the Los Angeles Dodgers. He became a free agent following the season on November 2.

=== Atlanta Braves ===
On November 28, 2012, Corcoran signed a minor league contract with the Atlanta Braves. He was released on June 3.

=== Yokohama Bay Stars ===
On June 27, 2013, Corcoran signed with the Yokohama Bay Stars of Nippon Professional Baseball. He became a free agent following the season.
