= Jamie Nelson =

American baseball player and coach (born 1959)

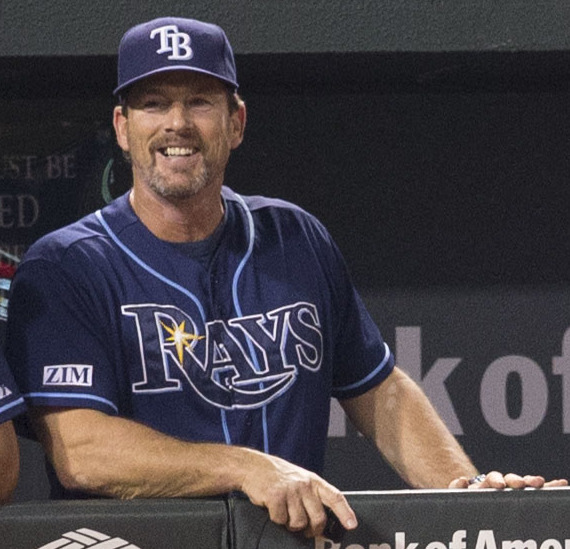
- Nelson with the Tampa Bay Rays in 2014
- Catcher / Coach
- Born: September 5, 1959 (age 67); Clinton, Oklahoma, U.S.
- Batted: Right Threw: Right

MLB debut
- July 21, 1983, for the Seattle Mariners

Last MLB appearance
- October 1, 1983, for the Seattle Mariners

MLB statistics
- Batting average: .219
- Home runs: 1
- Runs batted in: 5
- Stats at Baseball Reference

Teams
- Seattle Mariners (1983)

James Victor Nelson (born September 5, 1959) is an American former professional baseball player. Nelson played in Major League Baseball (MLB) for the Seattle Mariners during the 1983 season. He is currently a coach for the Tampa Bay Rays.

Nelson attended Bolsa Grande High School in Garden Grove, California, then Orange Coast College. The New York Mets drafted Nelson in the eighth round of the 1978 MLB draft. He played three seasons in the minors in Class A. He signed as a free agent with the Mariners in 1981. He reached the majors in 1983. In 40 games, he batted .219 with one home run and five RBIs. He began having trouble with his throwing arm in 1984, while in spring training with the Chicago Cubs. That September, Dr. Frank Jobe performed surgery on Nelson. He played in Minor League Baseball through 1990.

Nelson became a coach in the minor leagues with the Rays in 2000. He coached in the majors with the Rays from 2013 to 2017, then moved back down to the team's minor league system, including managing the Princeton Rays. Ahead of the 2026 season, he became a major league coach again, coaching catchers and hitters, though he is not a uniformed Rays coach during games.
