= Carl Crawford =

American baseball player (born 1981)

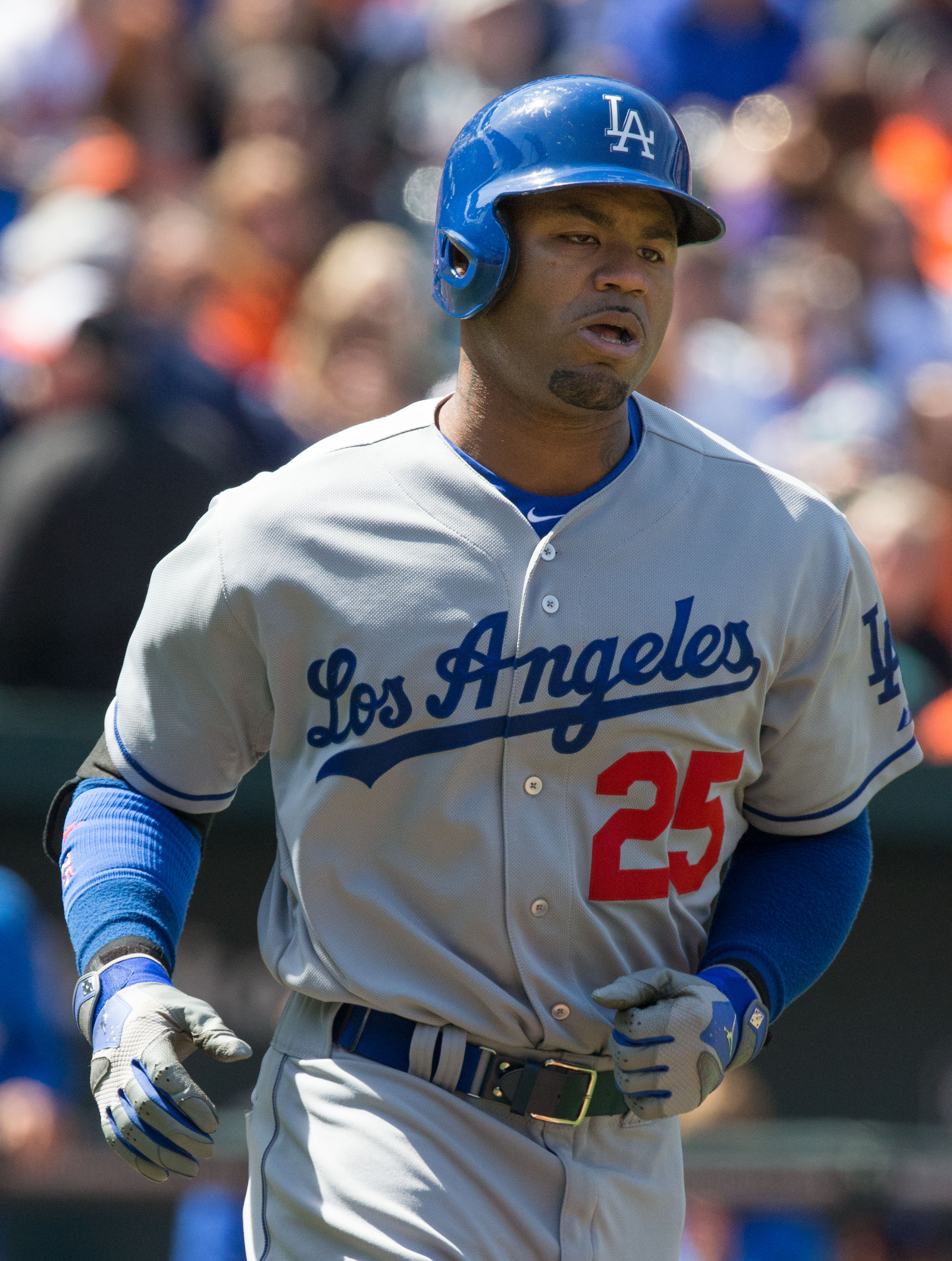
- Crawford with the Dodgers in 2013
- Left fielder
- Born: August 5, 1981 (age 45); Houston, Texas, U.S.
- Batted: Left Threw: Left

MLB debut
- July 20, 2002, for the Tampa Bay Devil Rays

Last MLB appearance
- June 3, 2016, for the Los Angeles Dodgers

MLB statistics
- Batting average: .290
- Home runs: 136
- Runs batted in: 766
- Stolen bases: 480
- Stats at Baseball Reference

Teams
- Tampa Bay Devil Rays / Rays (2002–2010); Boston Red Sox (2011–2012); Los Angeles Dodgers (2013–2016)

Career highlights and awards
- 4× All-Star (2004, 2007, 2009, 2010); Gold Glove Award (2010); Silver Slugger Award (2010); 4× AL stolen base leader (2003, 2004, 2006, 2007); Tampa Bay Rays Hall of Fame
Medals
Men's baseball
Representing United States
Baseball World Cup
| Silver medal – second place | 2001 Taipei | National team |

Carl Demonte Crawford (born August 5, 1981), nicknamed "the Perfect Storm", is an American former professional baseball left fielder. He played in Major League Baseball (MLB) for the Tampa Bay Rays, Boston Red Sox and Los Angeles Dodgers. He batted and threw left-handed.

Crawford is best known for his nine years with the Rays, during which he was considered one of the best baserunners in baseball. He led the American League in stolen bases and triples four times each while with Tampa Bay. After retiring from baseball in 2016, he founded the record label 1501 Certified Entertainment in 2016.

== Early life ==
Crawford is a native of the Fifth Ward area of Houston. He participated in the Reviving Baseball in Inner Cities program, and attended Jefferson Davis High School in Houston, Texas, and was a letterman in football, basketball, and baseball. As a child, he was on the same little league team as Michael Bourn, who also played in MLB. In high school baseball, he began working with former #1 pick Willie Ansley after his sophomore year. He batted .638 as a senior. In the summer of his junior year in high school coach Ansley advised him to get on a team that played in the same tournaments that Josh Beckett played in so he could be seen by the pro scouts and Crawford joined the Pasadena Stars select baseball team. It was there that he gained his first real exposure to Major League Baseball scouts. So intent on capitalizing on this exposure, he was advised by coach Ansley to skip basketball his senior year to concentrate on baseball so that his knees would be fresh from the beginning of the season. Crawford was offered scholarships to play basketball as a point guard at UCLA. He also had an option to play college football as an option quarterback at Nebraska, USC, Oklahoma, Florida, and Tulsa. He had originally signed a letter of intent to play football for Nebraska, but he turned down both offers in favor of a baseball career.

== Professional career ==
Crawford was drafted by the Devil Rays in the second round (52nd overall) of the 1999 Major League Baseball draft.

=== Minor leagues ===
In 2002, the Tampa Bay chapter of the BBWAA named Crawford the Devil Rays' Most Outstanding Rookie, and he earned International League Rookie of the Year playing for the AAA Durham Bulls.

=== Major leagues ===
==== Tampa Bay Devil Rays/Rays (2002–2010) ====
===== 2002–2006 =====
Crawford made his Major League debut at age 20 on July 20, 2002, against the Toronto Blue Jays. His first hit was in that game, a two RBI single off Steve Parris. He hit his first home run on August 10 off Shawn Sedlacek of the Kansas City Royals. He played in 63 games for the Devil Rays in 2002, batting .259 with 9 stolen bases.

In 2003, Crawford had a breakout season, batting .281 with 54 RBI and leading the league with 55 steals. Along with Juan Pierre, Crawford was co-winner of the Negro Leagues Baseball Museum James "Cool Papa" Bell Legacy Award for 2003.

In 2004, Crawford stole 59 bases, again leading the league and posting the second-highest total in the majors that season. He batted .296 with 11 home runs and 55 RBIs. Crawford also hit a league-leading 19 triples. He was selected for the All Star Game, played in his hometown of Houston, and was named Devil Rays team MVP in 2004 by the BBWAA.

Crawford batted .301 in 2005, becoming just the third .300 hitter in Devil Rays history, joining Aubrey Huff (.311 in 2003) and Fred McGriff (.310 in 1999). Crawford also posted career highs in hits (194), home runs (15), and RBI (81). He again led the league with 15 triples and placed third in steals (46).

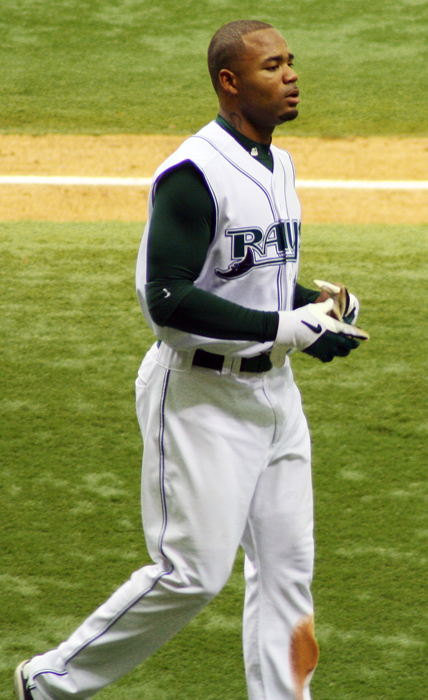
Crawford going back to the dugout in 2006

On July 5, 2006, against the Boston Red Sox, Crawford became only the eighth player in history to get 200 stolen bases before his 25th birthday. Crawford finished the season with career highs in batting average (.305) and home runs (18), joining Hall-of-Famer Rogers Hornsby as the only players in Major League history to increase their batting average and home run totals every year for five straight years. He won a Fielding Bible Award for his defensive excellence in left field during the season.

===== 2007–2010 =====
Crawford was named an All-Star for the second time in 2007, becoming the first Devil Ray to receive the honor more than once. He homered in the 6th inning of the All-Star Game, on a 3–2 pitch from Francisco Cordero of the Milwaukee Brewers.

In the second half of the season, Crawford had a sore right wrist which had been bothering him for some time, and did not hit a home run for a period of 42 days. Prior to a game against the Toronto Blue Jays, he had an MRI and was listed as doubtful to play because of the wrist. However, he pinch hit as the game went into extra innings and hit a walk-off home run, ending his drought. This kicked off a run of four homers in ten games. In August, ESPN.com named Crawford the Devil Rays' "Face of the Franchise".

On April 11, 2008, Crawford accumulated his 1,000th hit, making him the eighth player to hit 1,000 and steal 250 bases before turning 27. In game four of the American League Championship Series against the Boston Red Sox, Crawford tied an ALCS record with five hits in one game, going 5–5 and stealing two bases. After the season, he won his second Fielding Bible Award.

In 2008, he had surgery to fix the tendon of the middle finger of his right hand.

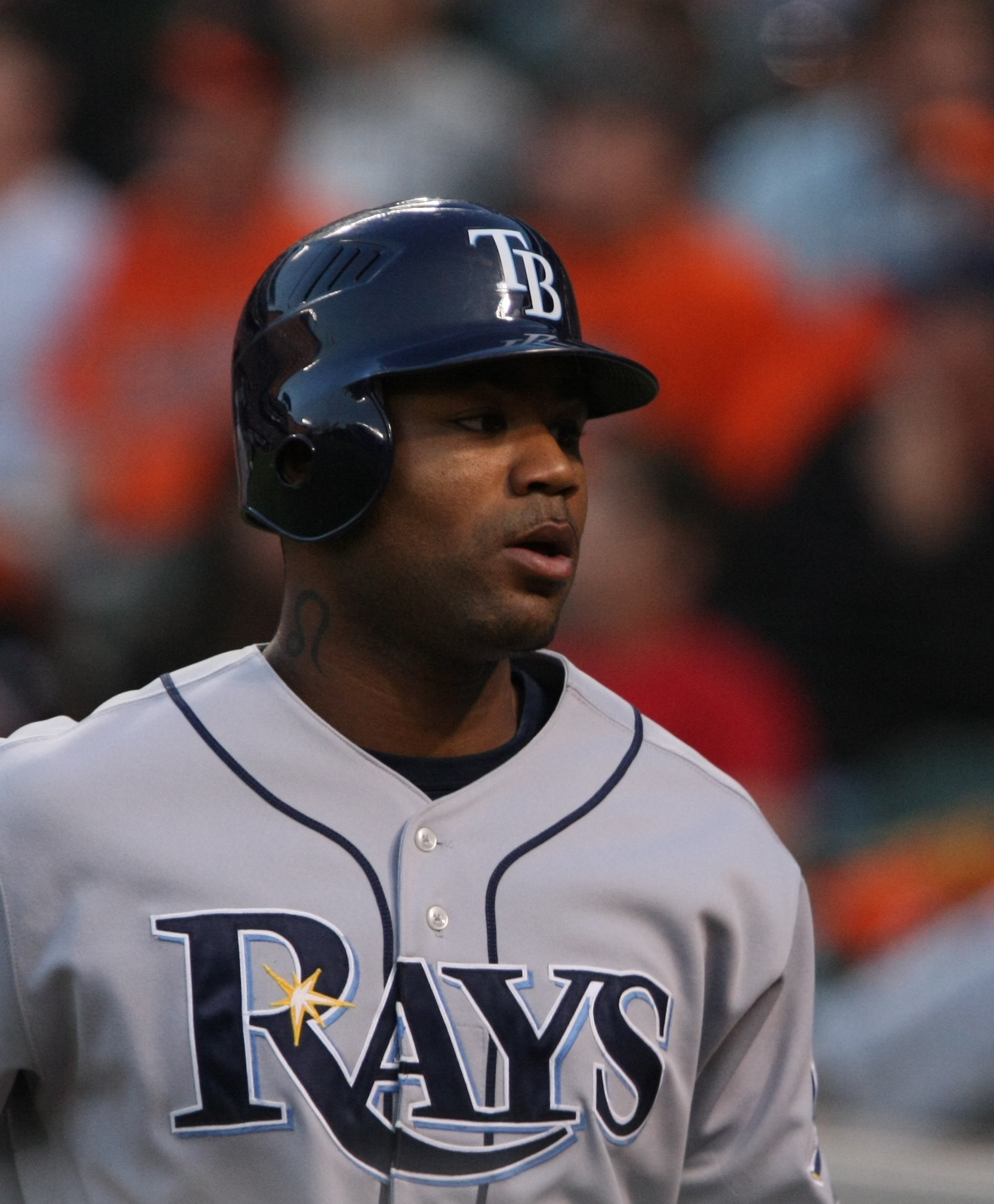
Crawford with the Tampa Bay Rays in 2009

On May 3, 2009, Carl Crawford tied a modern-era record by stealing six bases in a game against the Boston Red Sox, part of a team-record eight total stolen bases. On July 14, 2009, Crawford represented Tampa Bay in the 2009 All Star Game, where he was named MVP for a leaping catch at the top of the 8-foot outfield wall to prevent a possible go-ahead home run by Rockies outfielder Brad Hawpe.

In 2009, Crawford stole a career-high 60 bases and had the best range factor of all starting major league left fielders (2.34). He won his second consecutive Fielding Bible Award and third overall at left field.

On July 31, 2010, Crawford reached 400 stolen bases. He is the 7th player in history to reach that mark before his 29th birthday. On August 17, 2010, Crawford hit the 100th triple of his career, joining Ty Cobb as the only major league players to hit 100 triples and steal 400 bases before the age of 30. He finished the 2010 season with a career-high 19 home runs and 90 RBIs.

The Tampa Bay chapter of the Baseball Writers' Association of America voted Crawford the Most Valuable Player for the Rays in 2010. Following the conclusion of the season, Crawford was given the Gold Glove Award, as well as the Silver Slugger Award.

==== Boston Red Sox (2011–2012) ====
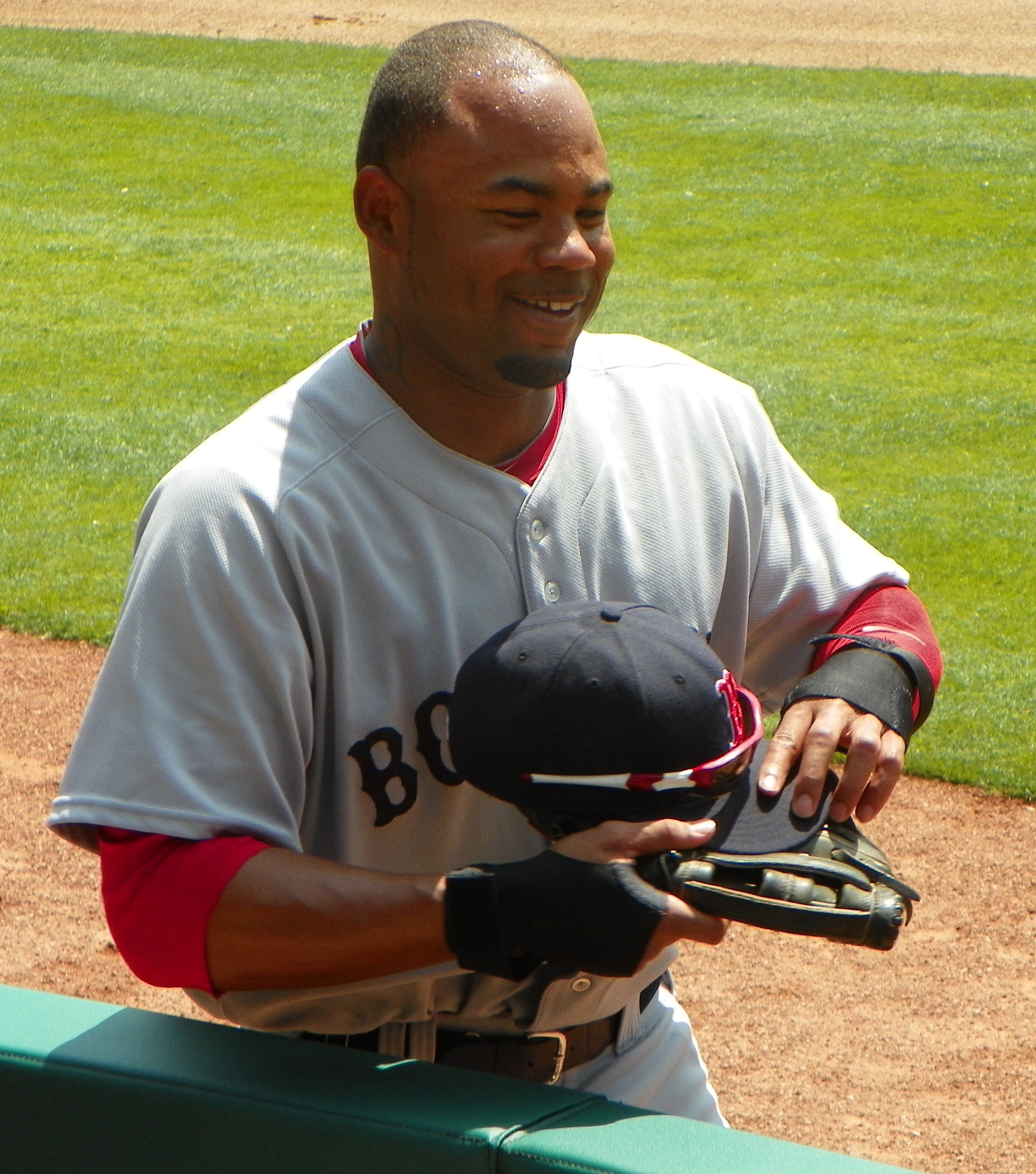
Crawford during his tenure with the Boston Red Sox in 2011

On December 8, 2010, Crawford signed a seven-year, $142-million contract with the Boston Red Sox. Crawford struggled to begin the 2011 season, batting .137 and stealing only 2 bases in his first 12 games. On May 3, he hit his 1,500th career hit, a single against Dan Haren of the Los Angeles Angels in the 3rd inning, becoming the 588th player with 1,500 or more career hits.

For the 2011 season, he batted .255 with an on-base percentage of .289. Through 2011, he had the third-best career fielding percentage (.990) among all active major league left fielders, behind Ryan Braun and Reed Johnson. However, on the last day of the regular season, his unsuccessful attempt to catch a ninth-inning line drive off the bat of Robert Andino was ruled a trap, allowing the Baltimore Orioles to walk off and completing Boston's historic nine-game September collapse that denied them a postseason berth.

Crawford injured his left wrist in January 2012. He had wrist surgery to repair cartilage damage, but had discomfort in his elbow and was told he had a sprained ligament.

He began the 2012 season on the 60-day disabled list. He had a rehab assignment with the Gulf Coast League, Double-A Portland, and Triple-A Pawtucket to recover from both injuries. Crawford made his 2012 regular season debut on July 16, 2012, against the Chicago White Sox.

On August 23, 2012, Crawford underwent season-ending reconstructive Tommy John surgery to repair a chronic ulnar collateral tear in his left elbow. For 2012, he batted .282/.306/.479 in 117 at bats. After being traded to the Dodgers, Crawford voiced his unhappiness with the Red Sox organization and the city of Boston, claiming that the baseball environment was "toxic" and that he was in a "depression stage" with Boston.

==== Los Angeles Dodgers (2012–2016) ====
===== 2012 =====
On August 25, 2012, he was traded to the Los Angeles Dodgers (along with Josh Beckett, Adrián González, Nick Punto, and $11 million in cash) for James Loney, Iván DeJesús, Jr., Allen Webster, and two players to be named later (Jerry Sands and Rubby De La Rosa). Despite initial concerns that his injury would keep him out for the first part of the 2013 season as well, Crawford made his Dodger debut as the starting left fielder and lead off hitter on Opening Day 2013.

===== 2013 =====
Crawford got off to a hot start with the Dodgers in 2013, hitting .308 with 4 home runs in the month of April. In 2013 with the Dodgers, missing almost one full month with a hamstring injury, he played in 116 games and hit .283/.329/.407 with 6 homers, 31 RBIs, and 15 stolen bases.

In the 2013 NLDS against the Braves, Crawford hit three home runs, including two in Game 4, which gave the Dodgers a huge boost and allowed them to beat the Braves in four games.

===== 2014 =====
Crawford had a slow start to the 2014 season, hitting just .191 in the month of April. However, he bounced back with a strong month of May, hitting .333. On May 27, Crawford suffered a sprained left ankle in a game against the Cincinnati Reds and was placed on the 15-day disabled list the next day. He was reactivated on July 10 after a rehab assignment with the Albuquerque Isotopes. Crawford finished the regular season with his highest batting average since leaving Tampa Bay. He hit .300 in 105 games, with 8 home runs, 46 RBIs, and 23 stolen bases.

===== 2015 =====
On April 27, 2015, Crawford tore his oblique muscle in a game against the Giants and was placed on the disabled list. He did not rejoin the Dodgers active roster until July 21. He appeared in 69 games for the Dodgers in 2015, hitting .265.

===== 2016 =====
Crawford spent the first two months of 2016 as a backup outfielder/occasional pinch hitter. In 30 games, he hit .185 with a .230 on-base percentage in 81 at bats. On June 5, Crawford was designated for assignment with approximately $35 million remaining on his contract. On June 13, he was released by the Dodgers. In a 2017 interview, Crawford said that he declined offers to try out with other major league teams after the Dodgers released him and was planning to retire when his final contract expired.

===== Career statistics =====
In 1,716 games over 15 seasons, Crawford posted a .290 batting average (1931-for-6655) with 998 runs, 309 doubles, 123 triples, 136 home runs, 766 RBI, 480 stolen bases, 377 bases on balls, .330 on-base percentage and .435 slugging percentage. He finished his career with a .989 fielding percentage playing at left and center field. In 39 postseason games, he hit .260 (40-for-154) with 21 runs, 5 doubles, 7 home runs, 16 RBI, 10 stolen bases and 6 walks.

=== Awards and accomplishments ===
- American League All-Star (2004, 2006, 2009, 2010)
- Gold Glove Award (2010)
- Silver Slugger Award (2010)
- Fielding Bible Award (2006, 2008, 2009)
- American League stolen base leader (2003, 2004, 2006, 2007)
- American League triples leader (2004), (2005), (2006), (2010)
- All-Star Game MVP (2009)
- MLB modern-era, single-game, stolen-base record: 6 (May 3, 2009)
- International League Rookie of the Year (2002)
- Negro Leagues Baseball Museum "Cool Papa Bell Legacy Award" (2003)
- Tampa Bay Chapter/BBWAA Devil Rays Most Valuable Player (2004, 2010)
- Tampa Bay Chapter/BBWAA Devil Rays Most Outstanding Rookie (2002)
- Rays' single-season runs record: 110 (2010)
- Rays' single-season triples record: 19 (2004)
- Rays' single-season stolen base record: 60 (2009)
- Rays' all-time leader in at bats, plate appearances, RBIs, runs scored, hits, doubles, triples, strikeouts, stolen bases, and singles.
- Named the Rays' "Face of the Franchise" by ESPN

Crawford was included on the ballot for the National Baseball Hall of Fame class of 2022 when it was announced on November 22, 2021; he did not receive any votes.

== Personal life ==
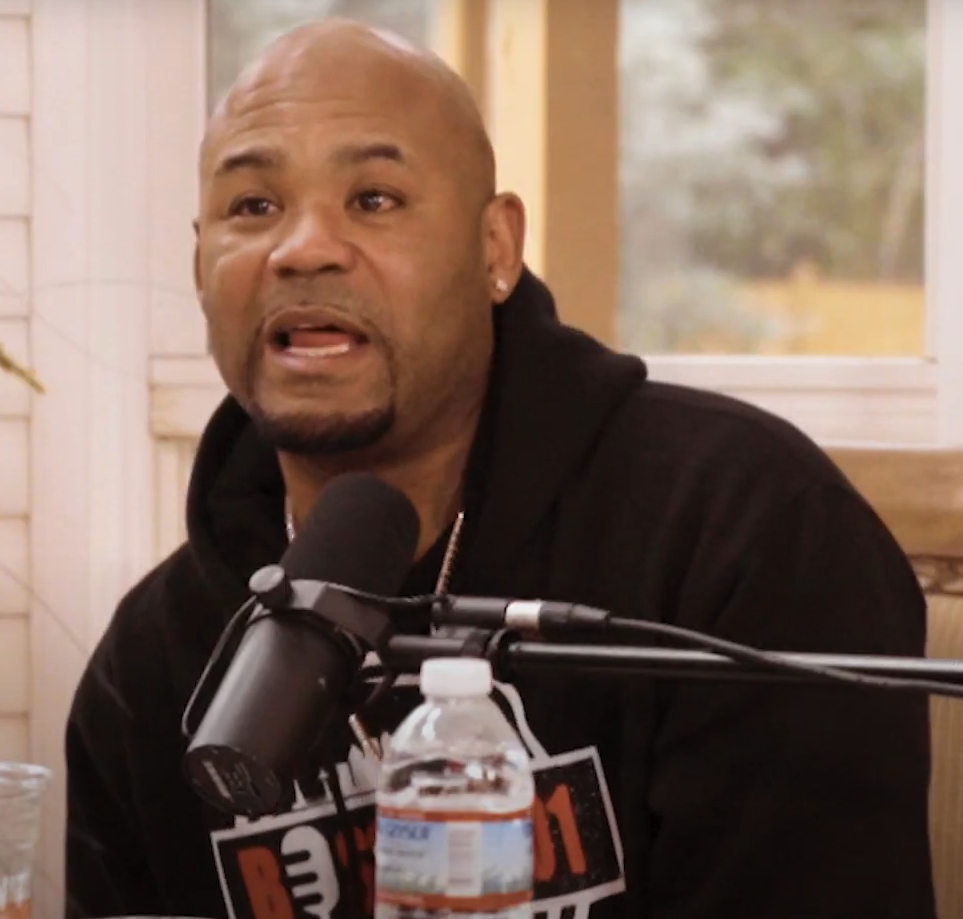
Crawford giving an interview c. January 2022

Crawford's first cousin once removed, J. P. Crawford, also plays baseball. He was drafted by the Philadelphia Phillies in the 1st round of the 2013 MLB draft, 17th overall.

Carl has two children with Amy Freeman: son, Justin, born in 2004 and daughter, Ari, born in June 2013. Justin Crawford was selected in the first round of the 2022 MLB draft, also by the Philadelphia Phillies.

In December 2013, Crawford announced his engagement to Evelyn Lozada. Crawford and Lozada have a son, Carl Jr., who was born in March 2014. In August 2017, the couple called off the engagement.

In May 2020, Crawford was arrested and charged with assaulting an ex-girlfriend Gabriele Washington in the presence of their one-year-old daughter.

On May 16, 2020, a five-year-old boy and 25-year-old woman drowned in the swimming pool during a party at Crawford's home in Harris County, Texas. The child's mother filed a lawsuit against Crawford that June.

=== 1501 Certified Entertainment ===
Crawford is CEO of 1501 Certified Entertainment, an independent record label based in Houston. In early 2018, the label signed hip-hop artist Megan Thee Stallion, who quickly rose to fame with a string of hit songs. All of her releases from 1501 Certified are now marketed by 300 Entertainment and distributed by Warner Music Group. In March 2020, several months after she signed a management deal with Roc Nation, Megan Thee Stallion sued 1501 Certified and Crawford, claiming they were blocking her from releasing music while refusing to renegotiate or terminate a contract she called "entirely unconscionable." In an interview with Billboard magazine, Crawford denied wrongdoing, insisted the contract was generous for a new musical act, and characterized the lawsuit as an attempt by Roc Nation to intimidate him into renegotiating.

== See also ==
- List of Major League Baseball stolen base records
- List of Major League Baseball annual stolen base leaders
- List of Major League Baseball career stolen bases leaders
- List of Major League Baseball annual triples leaders
- List of Major League Baseball career triples leaders

| Preceded by Josh Hamilton | American League Player of the Month; June 2008 | Succeeded by Miguel Cabrera |
