= 2008 Tampa Bay Rays season =

2008 Tampa Bay Rays
- American League champions American League East champions
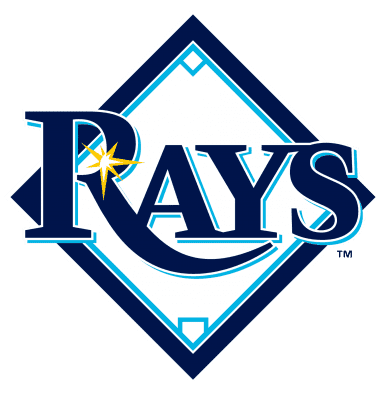
- League: American League
- Division: East
- Ballpark: Tropicana Field
- City: St. Petersburg, Florida
- Record: 97–65 (.599)
- Divisional place: 1st
- Owners: Stuart Sternberg
- General managers: Andrew Friedman (de facto)
- Managers: Joe Maddon
- Television: FSN Florida; WXPX (Ion TV 66)
- Radio: WHNZ; WGES (Spanish)

The 2008 Tampa Bay Rays season was the 11th season in franchise history, and the first season in which they were known as the Tampa Bay Rays, formerly being known as the Tampa Bay Devil Rays. This was the third season with Joe Maddon managing the club. After being plagued by futility as the Devil Rays, amassing just a .398 winning percentage over their first 10 years as a franchise and finishing in last place nine times, the team finished their first season as the Rays with a 97–65 record to win their first American League East division title. In the postseason, they beat the Chicago White Sox three games to one in the ALDS, and beat the defending World Series champion Boston Red Sox in seven games in the ALCS to advance to their first World Series in franchise history. They would go on to lose to the Philadelphia Phillies in five games.

== Summary ==
=== Spring training ===
The Rays, with their off-season acquisitions and continued prospect development, fostered high hopes both within the organization and from analysts for the team to perform well during the 2008 season. Their performance on the field during spring training justified those hopes. On March 23, they won their team-record 15th spring training game, and finished with a record of 18–8 with two ties and two cancellations due to rain, along with having the highest winning percentage of all teams in spring training.

There were lingering questions, however. Ace pitcher Scott Kazmir had been dogged with arm soreness all spring, and was placed on the 15-day disabled list, retroactive to March 21. He was expected to be ready in early May. Ben Zobrist, who had been groomed for a super-utility role, suffered a broken thumb during the second week of spring training. Rocco Baldelli, after missing most of the 2007 season with a hamstring injury, was sidelined indefinitely due to chronic fatigue believed to be caused by mitochondrial disease, and placed on the 60-day disabled list just days before the start of the season.

Elliot Johnson, an infielder prospect on the 40-man roster who spent the previous season with the Durham Bulls, made headlines during a game against the New York Yankees when he crashed into Yankees prospect catcher Francisco Cervelli in a play at the plate. He was tagged out, but the collision led to Cervelli breaking his wrist. While the Yankee organization said the move was uncalled-for, most analysts claimed that it was a good baseball play. Johnson himself stated he never intended to hurt Cervelli. The act is believed to have led to heightened tensions in their next game on March 12. It led to an incident where Yankees outfielder Shelley Duncan slid with his spikes high into Akinori Iwamura, leading to a fight between Duncan and Jonny Gomes. During the bench-clearing brawl, Melky Cabrera punched Rays third baseman Evan Longoria. Duncan, Cabrera and Gomes were suspended for three, three, and two games respectively. All three dropped their appeals, and had their suspensions reduced by a game.

Pitcher David Price, the #1 pick in the 2007 Amateur Draft, made his spring training debut on March 8 (prior to the Elliot Johnson incident), accidentally hitting Francisco Cervelli on the arm before striking out 2 to get through the inning. His fastball reached 99 mph on radar guns. After three appearances, he was officially assigned to High-A Vero Beach but was expected to advance quickly through the minor leagues.

The initial starting rotation for the Rays was James Shields, Matt Garza, Andy Sonnanstine, Edwin Jackson and Jason Hammel.

=== April ===
April turned into feast-or-famine for the Rays. The bullpen, which was derided as the worst in baseball in 2007, was the best in the league at the end of the month, with a 2.52 ERA. New closer Troy Percival saved 5 games, and did not allow a single run.

Carlos Peña was bringing the lumber that made him a superstar in 2007, having six home runs in the first 20 games, but finished the month with 31 strikeouts, and had difficulty getting on base with a batting average of just .200. The bigger surprise has been Eric Hinske. Appearing in 25 games, he hit .293 with 6 home runs and 15 RBI. On April 22, against the Toronto Blue Jays in Orlando, he was a single away from hitting for the cycle, which would have made him the first Ray to ever accomplish such a feat. For the second year in a row, the Rays won a sweep during the home series at Champion Stadium.

Evan Longoria was one of the last cuts in spring training, surprising Rays fans. He was called up on April 11 after their chosen third baseman, Willy Aybar, went on the disabled list. After six appearances, he was signed to a six-year, $15 million contract. His future seemed promising for the season, with a .250 average and 3 home runs in April. In one game against the Yankees, Longoria hit a home run that capped a 5-run inning to tie the game, and a few weeks later, he homered off of Josh Beckett of the Red Sox, which provided a cushion for the team to complete their first sweep of the Boston Red Sox in franchise history.

James Shields, with the absence of Scott Kazmir, became the team's ace pitcher. In six starts, he went 3–1, with the one loss coming to the New York Yankees, opposite their ace Chien-Ming Wang. On April 27, he pitched his first complete game of his career in a game against the Red Sox, where he allowed only 3 batters to reach base. Just a few days after his career outing, he was named AL Player of the Week.

After their sweep of the Red Sox, the Rays were 14–11, which was the latest the team had ever been 3 games over .500 in a season. In 26 games during the month, the Rays went 14–12, which marked the first time in franchise history that the team had a winning record for the month of April.

=== May ===
After winning a series in Baltimore on May 1, the Rays were 16–12, the first time ever the team was 4 games over .500. Although they suffered a sweep to the Red Sox at Fenway Park immediately following, they bounced back with a series win against the Blue Jays at Rogers Centre and a sweep of the Angels at Tropicana Field. After a win over the Yankees in extra innings Hank Steinbrenner, Senior Vice President and part-owner of the New York Yankees, expressed his frustration with his team at the time, saying that the Yankees "got to start playing the way the Rays are playing", and that he wished the Rays were in a different division. Hank also stated that he was happy for the Rays, but that he wished they played in the National League instead.

Following a win on Memorial Day, the Rays became the first team in over 100 years to hold the best record in the league through Memorial Day after having the worst record in the league the year before. The last team to do it was the New York Giants in 1903.

Closer Troy Percival was placed on the disabled list for precautionary measures following his removal from a game in which he felt tightness in his hamstring after striking out a batter and then falling to the ground. Percival threw several warm-up pitches but then left the game.

Scott Kazmir set a new franchise record for the most wins in one month. Kazmir lost his first start of the season in Boston, but then won his next five starts following that loss, also sporting a 1.22 ERA in all six starts. Because of this, he was named American League Pitcher of the Month.

The Rays finished May with a 34–22 record, the best record in the American League, leading the division by one game over the Boston Red Sox, and had their first winning record in the month of May (19–10).

=== June ===
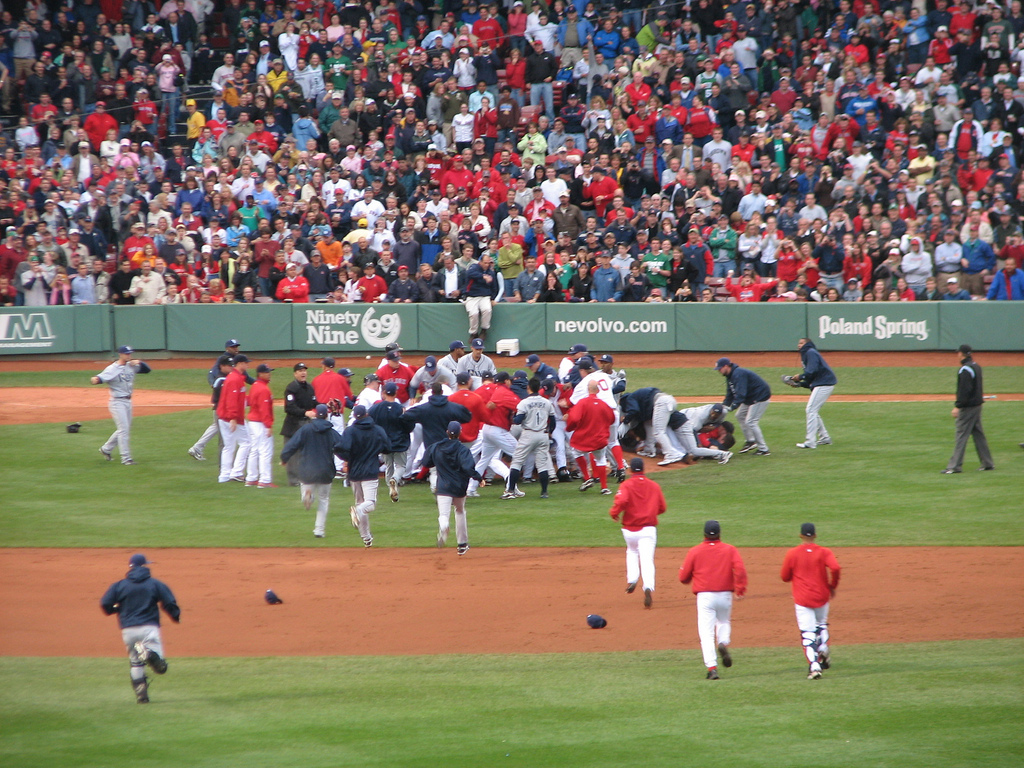
The Rays and Red Sox brawl at Fenway Park, 2008.

Carlos Peña fractured his left index finger on June 4, and was placed on the disabled list. He returned to the team on June 26, wearing a protective padding outside of his left batting glove to help ease impact. Rays manager Joe Maddon stated that once the Rays finished interleague play, and returned to playing American League teams, he would consider putting Pena in the designated hitter role to help ease the workload on his left index finger, as the Rays were more concerned about his ability to throw the ball, more than having to swing the bat.

On June 5 the Rays were involved in a benches clearing brawl at Fenway Park with the Boston Red Sox following a series of events leading up from the previous night's game. In the previous game, Red Sox center fielder Coco Crisp attempted to steal second base, and slid into the base head first. Rays Shortstop Jason Bartlett who was covering the base on the play, knelt on his left knee while attempting to catch the throw from Catcher Dioner Navarro, which blocked the base and caused Crisp to make contact with Bartlett's leg, jamming Crisp's thumb. Crisp was safe on the play. Crisp stated that Bartlett's actions were "not something you do. You can do that, but that's shady. And he's not a bad dude, but that was shady. If you going to hurt me, I'm gonna come back and hurt you."

In the same game, Crisp reached base in his next at-bat, and attempted to steal second base once again. On this steal attempt however, Rays second baseman Akinori Iwamura was covering the bag. Unlike his previous steal attempt, Crisp slid feet first, resembling the way a runner attempts to break up a double play by sliding into the player covering the base. Crisp was out on the play. Rays manager Joe Maddon engaged in a heated argument with Crisp upon Maddon making a mound visit, with Crisp being in the Red Sox dugout at that time. Joe Maddon said after the game's conclusion, "I was not pleased with the slide. I totally felt there was intent to hurt our middle infielder and that's what I was upset with. There's no place for that when you intentionally try to hurt somebody."

The next night, Rays pitcher James Shields hit Crisp below the waist on the first pitch in Crisp's first at-bat of the game. Crisp then charged the mound, punches were thrown by both players, and both teams' benches emptied onto the field. Shields and Crisp were ejected from the game, as well as Rays Designated Hitter Jonny Gomes.

Following the brawl, suspensions were given to players on both teams. For the Rays, Shields was given a suspension of 6 games, and for their actions in the fight, Gomes and pitcher Edwin Jackson were given 5 game suspensions, left fielder Carl Crawford was given a four-game suspension, and Iwamura was given a three-game suspension. For the Red Sox, Crisp was suspended for seven games, and for their actions in the fight, pitcher Jon Lester was given a 5-game suspension, and first baseman Sean Casey was given a 3-game suspension.

Both Crisp and Iwamura appealed their suspensions. On June 27, it was announced that Iwamura's suspension was upheld, while Crisp's was reduced to 5 games, no longer making him the longest suspended player of all involved. Iwamura was unhappy that his suspension was upheld so that he had to miss the first game of the next series against the Red Sox. Rays manager Joe Maddon stated that the decision "baffles" him and sought an explanation from the decision-makers. Both suspensions started the following day, and the decision caused Crisp to miss the next series against the Rays at Tropicana Field.

On June 12, it was reported that Red Sox closer Jonathan Papelbon had made comments about the incident stating that in his opinion, it was "a bunch of bull what [the Rays] did. All I got to say is what comes around goes around, man. Payback's a bitch, I'll tell you what", and that "this thing isn't all settled and done." Papelbon also said that things would be different at Tropicana Field the next time the Red Sox were there, as opposed to the last time in which the Red Sox were swept by the Rays for the first time in franchise history. In that series from June 30 to July 2, the Rays swept the Red Sox at home for the second time in the season, and Papelbon never pitched in the series.

On June 19, the Rays swept the Chicago Cubs in a 3-game series. It was the first time in franchise history that the Rays had swept a team with the best record in baseball, as the Cubs entered the series with the best record in the league at 45–25.

The Rays went 16–10 in June, improving to 50–32 overall and leading the division over the Red Sox by ½ game.

=== July ===
Troy Percival was placed on the Disabled List once again on July 1, due to re-injuring his hamstring, this time after running to back up a throw to third base. Percival and Rays manager Joe Maddon had a brief argument over Maddon's decision to take Percival out of the game, but Percival eventually walked off the field and understood Maddon's concern.

On July 2, the Rays completed a 3-game sweep of the Boston Red Sox, which was the first series between the two teams since their altercation in early June. It was the second home sweep by the Rays of the Red Sox in the season, and increased their division lead to 3.5 games over the Red Sox, as well as giving the Rays the best record in the league.

Pitcher Scott Kazmir and Catcher Dioner Navarro were named to the American League All-Star team on July 6. It was Navarro's first selection, while Kazmir had been selected previously in 2006.

Third baseman Evan Longoria was named to the American League All-Star roster on July 10. It was the first time the Rays sent three players to the All-Star Game. Longoria was voted into the roster by the All-Star Final Vote, where fans vote for one of five players for each league to be the final players selected for the All-Star Game. The chance to vote began on July 6 after the initial All-Star lineups were announced. Longoria was reported to have received over 9 million votes out of 47.8 million total votes cast. He won over Jermaine Dye, Jason Giambi, Brian Roberts, and José Guillén.

Longoria also took part in the Home Run Derby, the first Ray to ever do so. He was quickly eliminated, hitting only three home runs in the first round, the least of any competitor.

The Rays went into the All-Star break with a 7-game losing streak. They had won 7 straight before then. The losing streak caused the Rays to fall to 2nd place in the AL East, but by only half a game behind the Boston Red Sox. Even though the Rays lost the division lead, they still led the Wild Card spot by 2 1/2 games.

Barely managing a winning record for the month of July at 13–12, the Rays nonetheless went into August with the AL East division lead having an overall record of 63–44.

Despite many rumors and reports that the Rays would make a deal before the July 31 trade deadline, the Rays made no trades. Andrew Friedman, Executive Vice President of Baseball Operations for the Rays, commented on the lack of trade activity saying, "At the end of the day we didn't find something that lined up for us. We're in first place on July 31 and we control our own destiny. I feel we have the talent on hand to continue to do what we did the first two-thirds of the season."

=== August ===
The Rays acquired relief pitcher Chad Bradford on August 8 from the Baltimore Orioles for a player to be named later. To make room for Bradford on the roster, relief pitcher Al Reyes, who was the Rays' closer from the 2007 season and had 26 saves in that role, was designated for assignment.

On August 9, against the Seattle Mariners, the Rays equaled their franchise record, set in 2004, of 70 wins in a season. The following day, the Rays won again meaning at the season's conclusion, the Rays will have won more games in one season than in any other season in franchise history.

The injury bug bit the Rays a few times in August. On August 3, Shortstop Jason Bartlett was hit by a pitch on his right index finger, the result of a failed bunt attempt. Bartlett was not placed on the Disabled List but missed several days before returning to the lineup as the designated hitter. He did not return to his position in the field until August 15. Left fielder Carl Crawford was placed on the disabled lst on August 10, with a hand injury. Crawford's injury was called by the Rays as a "tendon subluxation" in the middle finger of his right hand, simply meaning that the tendon is not in its normal position. Crawford opted to have surgery, deciding not to place a splint on his hand instead. An initial report stated that there was a possibility that Crawford could miss the rest of the season, but after it was announced that he would undergo surgery, he was reported to "likely, though not absolutely" miss the rest of the regular season. One day after placing Crawford on the Disabled List, the Rays place third baseman Evan Longoria on it as well, retroactive to August 8. The injury to Longoria's right hand, suffered from being hit by a pitch, was at first thought to be just a bruise, but turned out to be a fracture. Executive Vice President, Andrew Friedman, stated that Longoria was expected to be out for three weeks. Closer Troy Percival was removed from another game on August 14, because of a right knee sprain which he suffered from fielding a bunt and tagging the runner out. After further evaluation, it was reported that there was "cartilage involvement" in Percival's injury, but it was not a tear. The following day, Percival was once again placed on the Disabled List. When the announcement was made that he would not have surgery, Percival revealed that he may return sooner than expected.

Because of Crawford's injury, Rocco Baldelli was finally activated to take his place on the roster. On August 10, Baldelli started the day's game in right field, his first major league game since May 15, 2007.

On August 29, the Rays recorded their 82nd win of the season, needing just 133 games to reach the milestone, and thus clinching the first winning season in franchise history.

By the end of the month, the Rays' entire starting rotation, Scott Kazmir, Matt Garza, Edwin Jackson, Andy Sonnanstine, and James Shields, had recorded at least 10 wins.

On the last day in August, shortstop Jason Bartlett hit his first home run as a member of the Rays, and his first home run overall since August 27, 2007, spanning 471 at-bats.

Despite the injuries to Longoria, Crawford, and Percival, the Rays had the best single month in franchise history, going 21–7 for the month of August. With an 84–51 overall record, the Rays went into September with the best record in baseball, with a 5 1/2-game lead in the division, and eyeing their first playoff appearance in franchise history. As Jason Bartlett stated, the Rays were "pumped" for the final month of the season, "no one wants to play us, especially at home," and the team was determined to prove that they were a legitimate post-season contender.

=== September ===
Troy Percival was activated from the disabled list on September 2. In Toronto for his second outing since his return, he allowed a walk-off grand slam with two outs when the Rays were ahead by a single run and in position to win the game in extra innings. Against Boston during another extra inning game, Percival came in to close with a three-run lead and allowed the first three batters to reach base. He was removed from the game in favor of Jason Hammel, who had never recorded a save at the MLB level, and was the only remaining reliever available for the Rays in the game due to its length. Hammel converted the save opportunity, but many questioned if Percival should remain as the team's closer. The reason for Percival's removal from the game against Boston was a stiff back, and not for the game's situation, or for any sort of leg injury that had plagued him throughout the year. Percival stated that because of warming up multiple times throughout the game, only to not come in until the Rays took a lead, was what pained his back. Percival acknowledged that he knew he didn't feel well, and that he should have called for his own removal, but decided that with the lead the Rays had, he was able to get the job done. As a result of the game, the Rays decided to not use Percival too often on consecutive nights, and using him in a tie game if the situation of the game changes while he is warming up. He still was listed as the team's closer.

Instant replay made its Major League Baseball debut at Tropicana Field on September 3 after Alex Rodriguez of the New York Yankees hit a ball near the left-field foul pole that was initially ruled a home run by third base umpire Brian Runge. Rays manager Joe Maddon argued that the ball was foul and asked for a review. After a conversation among the umpires, though all agreed the play was ruled correctly, crew chief Charlie Reliford allowed the replay to take place and after review, upheld the home run call. On September 19 at Tropicana Field, instant replay overturned a call on the field for the first time ever in Major League Baseball. A fly ball hit by Rays first baseman Carlos Peña, the umpires ruled, was interfered with by a fan sitting in the front row of the stands, when the ball hit the hands of the fan and fell back onto the field of play. After Joe Maddon requested the umpires hold a conference to discuss the play, the umpires, headed by Gerry Davis, decided to look at instant replay. Just over four minutes later, Davis returned to the field and signaled that the ball was a home run.

David Price, the Rays' first overall pick in the 2007 Major League Baseball draft, was called up from Triple-A class Durham on September 12. Price made his way up through the ranks, accumulating a 12–1 minor league record, and a 2.30 ERA in 19 starts. He made his first career start against the Baltimore Orioles on September 22, pitching 5 1/3 innings, allowing four hits and two runs (one earned), while striking out three, but did not pick up a decision in the Rays 4–2 win that night.

Third baseman Evan Longoria made his return to the Rays as a starter on September 13 in the first game of a doubleheader against the New York Yankees, more than a month after being hit by a pitch in his hand, causing a fracture.

On September 18, it was reported that left fielder Carl Crawford would miss the rest of the regular season due to a finger injury suffered in the previous month. Joe Maddon stated that the concern was over Crawford's inability to swing a bat, and that if he were to be used at all before being completely healed, it would be for defense and baserunning. Crawford said that if the Rays were to make the ALCS or the World Series, he had a chance to come back.

On September 20, the Rays clinched their first playoff berth in franchise history, after a 7–2 victory over the Minnesota Twins. On September 24, St. Petersburg mayor Rick Baker declared 2008 the "Year of the Rays" in the city. On September 26, despite losing that day, the Rays clinched their first ever AL East Division championship when the Boston Red Sox lost to the New York Yankees.

Going 13–14 for the month, the Rays suffered their only losing month of the season.

The Rays finished the regular season 2 games ahead of the Boston Red Sox for the division championship with a 97–65 record, the third best record in the league, and 31 games better than their finish in the 2007 season. They also surpassed the record for most wins by a team in a single season having finished with the worst record in the previous year, set by the Atlanta Braves in 1991 who went 94–68 after finishing 65–97 in 1990.

=== Postseason ===
==== American League Division Series: vs. Chicago White Sox ====
The Rays began their first playoff run in franchise history against the AL Central division champion Chicago White Sox, who finished the regular season 89–74 and advanced to the playoffs after defeating the Minnesota Twins in a one-game playoff to decide the winner of their division. In the regular season, the Rays were 5–2 against the White Sox. The Rays had home-field advantage for the series.

On September 30, it was announced that Carl Crawford would start for the Rays in his regular left field position, his first start in nearly two months after injuring his right hand and undergoing surgery thereafter.

In Game 1, Rays first baseman Carlos Peña started the game, but left after his first at-bat after reportedly having blurry vision because of an eye injury suffered at his home the previous night. Rays third baseman Evan Longoria hit a solo home run in the 2nd inning on the first pitch of his first career post-season at-bat, giving the Rays the early one-run lead. White Sox left fielder DeWayne Wise hit a 3-run home run in the next inning to put Chicago ahead 3–1. The Rays came back in the bottom half of the 3rd inning with three runs of their own, including another home run by Longoria, putting the Rays back on top 4–3. Two more RBI singles in the 5th inning gave the Rays a 6–3 cushion. In the 7th inning, Rays relief pitcher Grant Balfour appeared to get into an argument with White Sox shortstop Orlando Cabrera. After Balfour's first pitch to Cabrera, which was a ball to Cabrera's far side, Cabrera kicked some dirt in Balfour's direction. Balfour, who is known to get fired up by shouting to himself, may have yelled something that Cabrera took offense too. After words were exchanged between the two, play continued and Balfour finished the at-bat by striking out Cabrera. Cabrera later stated that he was unaware of Balfour's tendency to pump himself up, and that "it was just heat of the moment." Dan Wheeler came in to close for the Rays in the 9th inning. After giving up a leadoff home run, he retired the next three batters, capping off a 6–4 win for the Rays in their first playoff game in franchise history, giving them a one-game lead in the 5-game series.

Peña was expected to start Game 2, but was scratched before the first pitch. Still, the Rays continued to shine. After starter Scott Kazmir allowed the bases to become loaded in the 1st inning, and gave up two runs to put the Rays in an early hole, the pitching staff did not allow another run as the Rays' offense came through strong for the second consecutive night. In the 2nd inning, Dioner Navarro cut the deficit to 2–1 on an RBI single. Akinori Iwamura hit a 2-run home run in the 5th inning to put the Rays ahead 3–2. Adding some insurance runs in the 8th inning from three RBI singles by Carl Crawford, Rocco Baldelli, and Navarro, the Rays had a comfortable 6–2 lead going into the final inning. Chad Bradford came in to finish the game off, and did so by striking out Jim Thome of the White Sox to give the Rays a commanding two games to none lead in the best-of-five series, with a chance to win their first ever playoff series, and a trip to the ALCS in Game 3 as the series moved to Chicago.

The Rays looked to be in shape to win the series early in Game 3, after Akinori Iwamura hit an infield single to bring in the game's first run, but starter Matt Garza allowed the White Sox to tie the game in the 3rd inning, and then take a 4–1 lead in the 4th inning. Juan Uribe of the White Sox added an RBI single in the 6th inning to increase the lead for Chicago. B.J. Upton hit a 2-run home run for the Rays in the 7th inning to make the game a bit closer, but the Rays could not get their bats going enough. The White Sox took Game 3 by a final score of 5–3, living to play another day only down two games to one in the series.

In Game 4, B.J. Upton hit two solo home runs in his first two at-bats which gave the Rays an early 2–0 lead. Cliff Floyd added an RBI double, followed by a Dioner Navarro RBI single in the 4th inning put the Rays ahead by 4 runs. Paul Konerko put the White Sox on the board with a solo home run in the 4th inning, but was answered in the 5th inning by a Carlos Peña single that scored one run, giving the Rays a 5–1 lead. Jermaine Dye had a solo home run in the 6th inning, but once again the Rays answered back with another RBI single by Peña in the 7th inning. Grant Balfour came in to close the game and struck out Ken Griffey Jr. to end the game, and in their first playoff series in franchise history, the Rays took the series three games to one, and advanced to the American League Championship Series.

==== American League Championship Series: vs. Boston Red Sox ====
The Rays' next round opponent was their division rivals, the Boston Red Sox. Boston won the American League wild card, and advanced to the ALCS by defeating the team who had finished the regular season with the best record in baseball, the Los Angeles Angels of Anaheim, three games to one in their ALDS series. The Rays won the season series against the Red Sox 10–8. In those 18 games, the visiting team won only three times.

In Game 1 neither team scored until the 5th inning when Jed Lowrie of the Red Sox hit a sacrifice fly that scored a run from third base. Red Sox starter Daisuke Matsuzaka held a no-hitter through six innings until a hit by Carl Crawford leading off the 7th inning. Following Crawford's base hit, Cliff Floyd singled, advancing Crawford to a scoring position. However, the Rays could not capitalize as the next three batters were retired to end the inning. In the 8th inning, Kevin Youkilis hit a fly ball to left field for the Red Sox, which went off the end of Carl Crawford's glove, scoring Dustin Pedroia from first base and giving the Red Sox a 2–0 lead. The 8th inning for the Rays saw the first two batter reach base to send Carlos Peña to the plate with none out. With three balls and no strikes, Rays manager Joe Maddon gave Pena the green light to swing away, a move which backfired as Peña flew out to right field. Evan Longoria then grounded into an inning ending double play. The Red Sox held on to their lead and shut out the Rays by a score of 2–0, taking the first game of the series.

While the first game of the series was a pitchers' duel, Game 2 was the exact opposite. The scoring opened up quickly, as the Red Sox put on a 2-out rally against Rays starter Scott Kazmir in the 1st inning from a Jason Bay double that scored Kevin Youkilis and David Ortiz to put the Red Sox up 2–0. The Rays answered in their half of the 1st inning off Red Sox starter Josh Beckett, with a 2-out home run by Evan Longoria which also brought in Carlos Peña, evening the game at 2–2. Dustin Pedroia hit a solo home run to left field in the 3rd inning, which was again answered by the Rays with B.J. Upton hitting a solo home run of his own to left field to tie the game back up at 3–3. Carl Crawford hit a single to score Evan Longoria, and the Rays took their first lead of the night at 4–3. Cliff Floyd went deep to center field in the 4th inning to give the Rays a 5–3 lead. The Red Sox hit three solo home runs in the 5th inning, including Dustin Pedroia for his second long ball of the night, Kevin Youkilis, and Jason Bay, respectively, putting the Red Sox back on top at 6–5. The Rays also scored three separate times in the 5th inning, off of a single from Carlos Peña, a double by Evan Longoria, and a single by Carl Crawford, retaking the lead at 8–6. The Red Sox did not go away quietly as Jason Bay hit a bases-loaded single to center field and cut the Rays' lead to 8–7. With Dan Wheeler in to pitch for the Rays in the 8th, a wild pitch scored Dustin Pedroia from third base to again tie the game at 8–8. The game went extra innings, where in the 11th inning, and Dan Wheeler still pitching for the Rays, walked a batter with one out, and rookie David Price came in for the Rays. Price walked the first batter he faced but stuck out Mark Kotsay, and was able to get Coco Crisp to ground into a force out at second base. For the Rays in the 11th inning, Dioner Navarro walked to lead off, and Fernando Perez came in to pinch run. Ben Zobrist then walked, and a ground out by Jason Bartlett advanced the runners. The Red Sox intentionally walked Akinori Iwamura to set up a double play chance, but B.J. Upton hit a fly ball to right field deep enough to score Fernando Perez from third base on a sacrifice fly, ending the game in the Rays' favor 9–8, knotting the series at one game each as the series shifted to Fenway Park for the next three games. The time that the game took to complete was 5 hours and 27 minutes.

Game 3 did play out very well for the Rays. Red Sox starter Jon Lester threw four pitches in the 1st inning, but gave up one run in the 2nd inning to put his team in an early hole. In the 3rd inning, the Rays distanced themselves from their opponents. B.J. Upton hit a 3-run home run, and two batters later, Evan Longoria added a solo home run to put the Rays up 5–0 in Boston. Rays starter Matt Garza held the Red Sox scoreless until a sacrifice fly scored a run in the 7th inning, the Rays still having a 5–1 advantage. Rocco Baldelli and Carlos Peña put the final nails in the Red Sox' coffin as far as Game 3 was concerned, Baldelli with a 3-run home run, and Peña with a solo shot in the 8th and 9th innings, respectively. The Rays won 9–1, taking a two games to one lead in the series.

It was more of the same for Tampa Bay in Game 4, jumping out to a 3–0 lead in the 1st inning on Red Sox starter Tim Wakefield with a 2-run home run by Carlos Peña, immediately followed by a solo home run by Evan Longoria. Willy Aybar added a 2-run home run of his own in the 3rd inning to make it 5–0. Kevin Cash put the Red Sox on the board in the bottom half of the 3rd inning with a solo home run. The Rays however, were not finished with their offensive explosion, putting together a lead of 11–1 through six innings. The Red Sox scored a run in the 8th inning, causing Rays manager Joe Maddon to pull starter Andy Sonnanstine. Both teams scored two runs in the 8th inning, but the Rays' lead proved to be insurmountable for the Red Sox, and they won by a final score of 13–4.

Game 5, for the longest time, looked as if it was going to be the clinching win for the Rays. B.J. Upton hit a two-run home run in the 1st inning to make it 2–0. Carlos Peña hit one of his own in the 3rd inning, immediately followed by a home run by Evan Longoria, giving the Rays a 5–0 lead. Upton double in the 7th inning, scoring two more runs, increasing the lead to 7–0. In the bottom half of the 7th inning, with Rays starter Scott Kazmir having been removed from the game by manager Joe Maddon, the Red Sox began to rally. Boston scored four runs in that inning via a Dustin Pedroia RBI single, and a 3-run home run by David Ortiz which cut the Rays' lead to 7–4. With the Rays' bats quiet in the 8th inning, J. D. Drew hit a 2-run home run to bring the Red Sox within one run, and Coco Crisp singled home the tying run to make the score even at 7–7. In the 9th inning, with the score still tied and two out, Kevin Youkilis hit a ground ball to Rays third baseman Evan Longoria who made an errant throw which allowed Youkilis to advance to second base. After an intentional walk issued by the Rays, J. D. Drew came up big for Boston once again, sailing a fly ball over the head of right fielder Gabe Gross which fell to the ground and then bounced over the right field wall, scoring Youkilis on the ground rule double and capping off the largest comeback by a team facing elimination in postseason history. The Rays series lead was now down to only one game heading into Game 6, but returned home as the series shifted back to Tropicana Field.

Game 6 began well for the Rays, with B.J. Upton continuing his postseason emergence with a solo home run in the 1st inning and giving the Rays the first lead of the night. The Red Sox returned that with a solo home run by Kevin Youkilis, leveling the score at 1–1. Youkilis gave the Red Sox the lead in the 3rd inning by grounding out, but scoring Dustin Pedroia from third base. In the 5th inning, Jason Bartlett hit his second home run of the entire season, another solo shot which tied the game at 2–2. Again, Boston quickly answered back, with a solo home run by captain Jason Varitek, his first base hit of the ALCS, Boston now having a 3–2 lead. Later in the inning, Coco Crisp singled, and in the next at-bat, Jason Bartlett committed a throwing error to First Base, allowing Crisp to advance to third base. David Ortiz then hit a single to give the Red Sox a 4–2 cushion, having scored Crisp. The Rays were unable to make a comeback, and lost the game by that score, their series lead now erased as a Game 7 had to be played to decide the series.

The starting pitchers of Game 7 were Jon Lester of the Red Sox, and Matt Garza of the Rays, a rematch of Game 3. Lester, who was the losing pitcher in Game 3, had never lost consecutive outings in his career. Dustin Pedroia wasted no time, homering off of Garza in the 1st inning for the early 1–0 lead in favor of Boston. After that, Garza was almost unhittable until his departure. Lester was also great early, retiring the first nine batters he faced before allowing a single in the 4th inning. Later in the inning, Evan Longoria dropped a double into right field, and scored Carlos Peña all the way from 1st Base to tie the game at 1–1. Rocco Baldelli knocked a single into left field in the 5th inning, scoring Willy Aybar from second base and putting the Rays ahead for the first time in the game, 2–1. With one out the 6th inning for the Red Sox, with Dustin Pedroia on first base and David Ortiz at the plate, Matt Garza was able to get "Big Papi" to swing and miss for the strikeout, and Dioner Navarro gunned down Pedroia at second base, who was attempting to steal on the pitch, ending that half of the inning. Willy Aybar belt a solo home run for the Rays in the 7th inning to give them a slightly more comfortable lead at 3–1. Garza was removed with one out in the 8th inning, having allowed only two hits and striking out nine batters, and receiving a standing ovation from Rays fans at the game as he left the field. The defending world champion Red Sox did not go away though, loading the bases in that inning. Joe Maddon elected to go with rookie David Price in hopes of ending the threat. Price did just that by striking out J. D. Drew on a check swing. Price returned to close out the game in the 9th inning, and after two strikeouts and a walk, Jed Lowrie hit a ground ball to Rays second baseman Akinori Iwamura, who stepped on second base to make the final out and send the Tampa Bay Rays to their first World Series in franchise history, defeating the Boston Red Sox four games to three. Garza, who had won two games in the series, was named ALCS MVP.

==== World Series: vs. Philadelphia Phillies ====
The Rays now stood only four wins from their first world championship, with only the Phillies in their way. Philadelphia won the NL East division title, disposed of the Milwaukee Brewers in their division series in four games, and the Los Angeles Dodgers in the NLCS in five games. The Rays had home field advantage because of the American League's win in the 2008 All-Star Game.

===== Game 1 =====
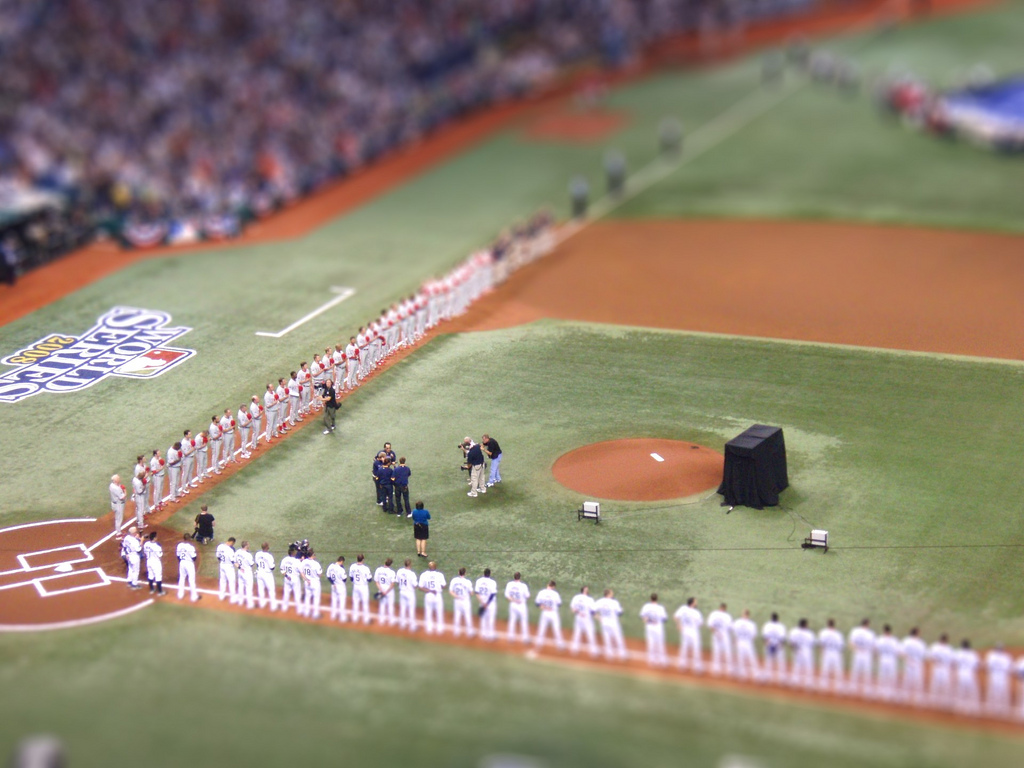
The teams on the field before Game 1

In Game 1, Rays starting pitcher Scott Kazmir did not get off to a good start to the Rays' first ever World Series game, giving up a 2-run home run to the Phillies' Chase Utley in the 1st inning. The Rays had a chance to get on the scoreboard in the 3rd inning with the bases loaded and one out, but did not score as B.J. Upton hit into a double play. The Phillies added another run in the 4th inning on an RBI groundout, jumping out to a 3–0 lead. Carl Crawford, the longest tenured Ray on the team's roster, gave the Rays their first run in World Series history, by hitting a solo home run off of Phillies' starter Cole Hamels in the 4th inning, cutting the deficit of 3–1. In the 5th inning, Akinori Iwamura hit an RBI double to bring the Rays within one. The Rays were not able to put up any more offense, with the Phillies relief pitchers retiring the Rays' last six batters and winning the game 3–2, taking the first game of the series.

===== Game 2 =====
Game 2, saw an impressive performance by the Rays' "Big Game James" Shields. In this game, it was the Rays taking a 2–0 lead in the 1st inning, on two consecutive RBI groundouts, each scoring a runner from third base. In the 3rd inning, B.J. Upton singled home Dioner Navarro, with Rocco Baldelli being thrown out at home plate after the score, giving the Rays a 3–0 lead. Shields was taken out of the game in the 6th inning after getting into a jam, but he did not give up any runs to the Phillies in the game. David Price eventually came into the game for the Rays in the 7th inning, and allowed the Phillies to get on the scoreboard from a solo home run by pinch-hitter Eric Bruntlett to make the score 4–1 with the Rays still ahead. Price finished the game, with the Phillies making it interesting by scoring a runner from second base because of an error by Rays' third baseman Evan Longoria, who deflected the ball into shallow left field. Already with one out, Price then struck out Chase Utley, and retired Ryan Howard on a groundout to end the game and give the Rays the 4–2 win. The series moved to Philadelphia and Citizens Bank Park, tied at one game for each team.

===== Game 3 =====
With the start of Game 3 delayed by rain for an hour and 31 minutes, the series finally resumed in Philadelphia just after 10 pm EST. Jamie Moyer became the oldest pitcher to start a World Series game, facing off against ALCS MVP Matt Garza. Philadelphia was on the board early, as Chase Utley was put out on a ground ball that scored a runner from third. The Rays evened the game at one run each in the 2nd inning as Gabe Gross flew out on a sacrifice fly. The Phillies took back the back in the 2nd inning after a solo home run by Carlos Ruiz. The Phillies made it 4–1 in the 6th inning from back-to-back home runs by Chase Utley and Ryan Howard. Gabe Gross scored Carl Crawford by grounding out, and Jason Bartlett did the same to score Dioner Navarro during the next at-bat to make the score 4–3 Philadelphia. In the 8th inning for the Rays, B.J. Upton singled to reach base. During Evan Longoria's at-bat, Upton stole second base, and later steal third base in the same at-bat. Trying to throw out Upton at third base, Phillies catcher Carlos Ruiz made a throwing error which allowed Upton to score and tie the game at 4–4. The 9th inning went sour for the Rays defensively, as Phillies batter Eric Bruntlett was hit by a pitch. When Bruntlett attempted to steal second base, Rays catcher Dioner Navarro made a throwing error which allowed Bruntlett to advance to third base. The Rays intentionally walked the next two batters, which loaded the bases with no outs. Carlos Ruiz hit a soft ground ball down the third base line, which was fielded cleanly by Rays third baseman Evan Longoria, but trying to toss to Navarro at home to make a forceout, sailed the throw over the catcher's head, and the winning run was scored by the Phillies to win the game 5–4, and take a two games to one series lead. Because of the game's late start, it was not completed until 1:47 am EST.

===== Game 4 =====
The Phillies scored in the 1st inning of Game 4 on a bases-loaded walk, and never looked back. Pedro Feliz drove in a run in the 3rd inning to make it a 2–0 Phillies lead. In the 4th inning, Carl Crawford hit a solo home run to cut the deficit in half to just one run for the Rays, but in the bottom half of the inning, Ryan Howard knocked a 3-run home run to make it a 5–1 game. Eric Hinske hit a solo home run to make it 5–2, but Phillies pitcher Joe Blanton hit a solo home run of his own to make it 6–2. In the 8th inning for the Phillies, Jayson Werth and Ryan Howard each hit 2-run home runs, finishing off the Rays in the most one-sided game the series had seen by a score of 10–2. The Phillies now had the Rays on the ropes, needing just one more win to become World Champions.

===== Game 5 =====
Game 5 was perhaps the most interesting game of the series. The Phillies scored in the 1st inning again, on a bases-loaded single by Shane Victorino to make it 2–0. Evan Longoria scored Carlos Peña to make it a 2–1 game.

At one point, it began to rain, and the weather conditions got worse as the game continued. There was much speculation, including that from Fox baseball commentators Joe Buck and Tim McCarver, that the game may be called early because of the weather. Major League Baseball rules state that the game could have been called after the 5th inning, ending the game and resulting in the Phillies winning the World Series. MLB commissioner Bud Selig had made it clear to both teams prior to the game anyway, that the game was not going to be called early under any circumstance, as he would not allow such an important game like this to be ended before the 9th inning. However, such a controversy was prevented from happening because of the events on the field, when in the 6th inning, Carlos Peña scored B.J. Upton to tie the game at 2–2.

Following the completion of the top of the 6th inning, the tarps were pulled over the infield, and the game was delayed until 11:10 pm EST, when it was officially announced that the game was suspended, making it the first time ever for a World Series game. It was not resumed the next day, as it continued to rain in Philadelphia, but the day following that, the game resumed.

The Phillies had scored in the 1st inning in each game of the World Series in Philadelphia, and essentially did the same again as Jayson Werth singled on a pop up that scored a run in the bottom of the 6th inning to give the Phillies a 3–2 lead. Rocco Baldelli kept the Rays in it with a solo home run in the 7th inning to tie the game again. Pedro Feliz answered that home run with an RBI single that ended up being the game winner, as Phillies closer Brad Lidge struck out Eric Hinske in the 9th inning to end the game. The Philadelphia Phillies had defeated the Rays four games to one to win their second World Series title, and first since 1980, and the first championship for the city of Philadelphia since the 76ers swept the 1983 NBA Finals. Cole Hamels was named MVP of the series.

== Regular season ==
=== Season standings ===
AL East
Team	W	L	Pct.	GB	Home	Road
Tampa Bay Rays	97	65	.599	—	57‍–‍24	40‍–‍41
Boston Red Sox	95	67	.586	2	56‍–‍25	39‍–‍42
New York Yankees	89	73	.549	8	48‍–‍33	41‍–‍40
Toronto Blue Jays	86	76	.531	11	47‍–‍34	39‍–‍42
Baltimore Orioles	68	93	.422	28½	37‍–‍43	31‍–‍50

=== Record vs. opponents ===
2008 American League record Source: MLB Standings Grid – 2008
Team	BAL	BOS	CWS	CLE	DET	KC	LAA	MIN	NYY	OAK	SEA	TB	TEX	TOR	NL
Baltimore	–	6–12	4–5	4–4	4–3	5–3	3–6	3–3	7–11	0–5	8–2	3–15	4–5	6–12	11–7
Boston	12–6	–	4–3	5–1	5–2	6–1	1–8	4–3	9–9	6–4	6–3	8–10	9–1	9–9	11–7
Chicago	5–4	3–4	–	11–7	12–6	12–6	5–5	9–10	2–5	5–4	5–1	4–6	3–3	1–7	12–6
Cleveland	4–4	1–5	7–11	–	11–7	10–8	4–5	8–10	4–3	5–4	4–5	5–2	6–4	6–1	6–12
Detroit	3–4	2–5	6–12	7–11	–	7–11	3–6	7–11	4–2	3–6	7–3	3–4	6–3	3–5	13–5
Kansas City	3–5	1–6	6–12	8–10	11–7	–	2–3	6–12	5–5	6–3	7–2	3–5	2–7	2–5	13–5
Los Angeles	6–3	8–1	5–5	5–4	6–3	3–2	–	5–3	7–3	10–9	14–5	3–6	12–7	6–3	10–8
Minnesota	3–3	3–4	10–9	10–8	11–7	12–6	3–5	–	4–6	5–5	5–4	3–3	5–5	0–6	14–4
New York	11–7	9–9	5–2	3–4	2–4	5–5	3–7	6–4	–	5–1	7–2	11–7	3–4	9–9	10–8
Oakland	5–0	4–6	4–5	4–5	6–3	3–6	9–10	5–5	1–5	-	10–9	3–6	7–12	4–6	10–8
Seattle	2–8	3–6	1–5	5–4	3–7	2–7	5–14	4–5	2–7	9–10	–	3–4	8–11	5–4	9–9
Tampa Bay	15–3	10–8	6–4	2–5	4–3	5–3	6–3	3–3	7–11	6–3	4–3	–	6–3	11–7	12–6
Texas	5–4	1–9	3–3	4–6	3–6	7–2	7–12	5–5	4–3	12–7	11–8	3–6	–	4–4	10–8
Toronto	12–6	9–9	7–1	1–6	5–3	5–2	3–6	6–0	9–9	6–4	4–5	7–11	4–4	–	8–10

== Walk-off wins ==
A key component of the success of the Rays in 2008 was its ability to hang on late in games. The team took eleven walk-off victories in the 2008 regular season, and one in the postseason, four of which were home runs:

1. April 25 vs. Red Sox: Nathan Haynes hit a walk-off RBI single off of Mike Timlin with two on and no outs in the bottom of the 11th inning, scoring Carl Crawford from second base.
2. May 9 vs. Angels: Evan Longoria hit a two-run walk-off home run off of Justin Speier with one on and one out in the bottom of the 9th inning, also scoring B. J. Upton.
3. May 13 vs. Yankees: Gabe Gross hit a walk-off RBI single off of Mariano Rivera with one on and no outs in the bottom of the 11th inning, scoring Jonny Gomes from second base.
4. May 25 vs. Orioles: Evan Longoria hit a walk-off RBI double off of Jim Johnson with one on and one out in the bottom of the 9th inning, scoring Carlos Peña from first base.
5. May 30 vs. White Sox: Cliff Floyd hit a walk-off home run off of Scott Linebrink to lead off the bottom of the 9th inning.
6. June 1 vs. White Sox: Gabe Gross hit a walk-off home run off of Matt Thornton to lead off the bottom of the 10th inning.
7. June 21 vs. Astros: Gabe Gross hit a walk-off two-RBI double off of Doug Brocail with the bases loaded and no outs in the bottom of the 9th inning, scoring Cliff Floyd and Eric Hinske.
8. August 3 vs. Tigers: Carlos Peña took a walk from Fernando Rodney with the bases loaded and two outs in the bottom of the 10th inning, scoring Shawn Riggans from third base.
9. August 6 vs. Indians: Carlos Peña hit a walk-off three-run home run off of Masahide Kobayashi with no outs in the bottom of the 9th inning, also scoring Akinori Iwamura and Ben Zobrist. Earlier in the inning, Edward Mujica lost a three-run lead by giving up an RBI double to Eric Hinske, followed by a two-run homer to Gabe Gross.
10. August 30 vs. Orioles: Rocco Baldelli hit a walk-off RBI double off of Rocky Cherry with one on and one out in the bottom of the 9th inning, scoring Carlos Peña from first base.
11. September 16 vs. Red Sox: Dioner Navarro hit a walk-off RBI single off of Justin Masterson with the bases loaded and one out in the bottom of the 9th inning, scoring Jason Bartlett from third base.
12. October 11 vs. Red Sox: In Game 2 of the ALCS, B.J. Upton hit a walk-off sacrifice fly off of Mike Timlin with the bases loaded and one out, scoring Fernando Perez from third base.

== Summer Concert Series ==
In March 2008, the Rays announced Tropicana Field would host seven Saturday night postgame concerts featuring various artists. One concert was added to the schedule later in the season. The Rays did not lose any of the eight games in which a concert followed.

1. On May 24, The Commodores performed after an 11–4 win over the Orioles.
2. On May 31, Trace Adkins performed after a 2–0 win over the White Sox.
3. On June 14, Gilberto Santa Rosa performed after a 4–1 win over the Marlins.
4. On June 21, Kool & The Gang performed after a 4–3 win over the Astros.
5. On July 5, Loverboy performed after a 3–0 win over the Royals.
6. On July 19, MC Hammer performed after a 6–4 win over the Blue Jays.
7. On August 2, LL Cool J performed after a 9–3 win over the Tigers.
8. On August 30, We The Kings performed after a 10–9 win over the Orioles.

== Game log ==
=== Regular season ===
2008 Game Log: 97–65 (Home: 57–24; Road: 40–41)
March (1–0)

#	Date	Opponent	Score	Win	Loss	Save	Attendance	Record
1	March 31	@ Orioles	6–2	Shields (1–0)	Guthrie (0–1)		46,807	1–0

April (14–12)

#	Date	Opponent	Score	Win	Loss	Save	Attendance	Record
2	April 2	@ Orioles	9–6	Walker (1–0)	Reyes (0–1)	Sherrill (1)	10,505	1–1
	April 3	@ Orioles	Postponed (rain) Rescheduled for September 23					
3	April 4	@ Yankees	13–4	Sonnanstine (1–0)	Kennedy (0–1)		49,255	2–1
4	April 5	@ Yankees	6–3	Jackson (1–0)	Pettitte (0–1)	Percival (1)	52,247	3–1
5	April 6	@ Yankees	2–0	Wang (2–0)	Shields (1–1)	Rivera (3)	51,279	3–2
6	April 7	@ Yankees	6–1	Mussina (1–0)	Hammel (0–1)		41,302	3–3
7	April 8	Mariners	6–5	Bédard (1–0)	Glover (0–1)	Rowland-Smith (1)	36,048	3–4
8	April 9	Mariners	7–1	Washburn (1–1)	Sonnanstine (1–1)		12,106	3–5
9	April 10	Mariners	7–0	Jackson (2–0)	Batista (0–2)		11,898	4–5
10	April 11	Orioles	10–5	Reyes (1–1)	Sarfate (2–1)		12,146	5–5
11	April 12	Orioles	3–2	Bradford (1–1)	Wheeler (0–1)	Sherrill (5)	19,295	5–6
12	April 13	Orioles	6–2	Niemann (1–0)	Burres (1–1)		16,748	6–6
13	April 14	Yankees	8–7	Bruney (1–0)	Reyes (1–2)	Rivera (4)	18,872	6–7
14	April 15	Yankees	5–3	Pettitte (2–1)	Jackson (2–1)	Rivera (5)	20,923	6–8
15	April 16	@ Twins	6–5	Rincón (1–0)	Wheeler (0–2)	Nathan (5)	20,209	6–9
16	April 17	@ Twins	7–3	Hammel (1–1)	Bonser (1–3)	Howell (1)	14,781	7–9
17	April 18	White Sox	9–2	Vázquez (3–1)	Niemann (1–1)		12,379	7–10
18	April 19	White Sox	5–0	Sonnanstine (2–1)	Buehrle (1–2)		17,613	8–10
19	April 20	White Sox	6–0	Danks (2–1)	Jackson (2–2)		17,212	8–11
20	April 22	Blue Jays*	6–4	Shields (2–1)	Litsch (2–1)	Percival (2)	8,269	9–11
21	April 23	Blue Jays*	5–3	Hammel (2–1)	Halladay (2–3)	Percival (3)	8,989	10–11
22	April 24	Blue Jays*	5–3	Sonnanstine (3–1)	McGowan (1–2)	Percival (4)	9,540	11–11
23	April 25	Red Sox	5–4 (11)	Dohmann (1–0)	Timlin (2–2)		30,290	12–11
24	April 26	Red Sox	2–1	Dohmann (2–0)	Buchholz (1–2)	Percival (5)	36,048	13–11
25	April 27	Red Sox	3–0	Shields (3–1)	Beckett (2–2)		32,363	14–11
26	April 29	@ Orioles	7–4	Olson (1–0)	Hammel (2–2)	Sherrill (10)	11,588	14–12
27	April 30	@ Orioles	8–1	Sonnanstine (4–1)	Albers (2–1)		11,944	15–12
* Played at Disney's Wide World of Sports in Orlando, Florida

May (19–10)

#	Date	Opponent	Score	Win	Loss	Save	Attendance	Record
28	May 1	@ Orioles	4–2	Garza (1–0)	Burres (3–2)	Percival (6)	16,456	16–12
29	May 2	@ Red Sox	7–3	Buchholz (2–2)	Jackson (2–3)		37,541	16–13
30	May 3	@ Red Sox	12–4	Beckett (3–2)	Shields (3–2)		37,700	16–14
31	May 4	@ Red Sox	7–3	Lester (2–2)	Kazmir (0–1)	Papelbon (9)	37,091	16–15
32	May 6	@ Blue Jays	5–4	Sonnanstine (5–1)	Burnett (3–3)	Percival (7)	30,397	17–15
33	May 7	@ Blue Jays	6–2	Marcum (4–2)	Garza (1–1)		19,276	17–16
34	May 8	@ Blue Jays	8–3 (13)	Howell (1–0)	Camp (0–1)		21,118	18–16
35	May 9	Angels	2–0	Shields (4–2)	Speier (0–2)		12,039	19–16
36	May 10	Angels	2–0	Kazmir (1–1)	Saunders (6–1)	Percival (8)	25,512	20–16
37	May 11	Angels	8–5	Howell (2–0)	Speier (0–3)	Percival (9)	13,010	21–16
38	May 12	Yankees	7–1	Garza (2–1)	Pettitte (3–4)		13,932	22–16
39	May 13	Yankees	2–1 (11)	Howell (3–0)	Rivera (0–1)		16,558	23–16
40	May 14	Yankees	2–1	Mussina (6–3)	Shields (4–3)	Rivera (11)	20,936	23–17
41	May 15	Yankees	5–2	Kazmir (2–1)	Kennedy (0–3)	Percival (10)	19,976	24–17
42	May 16	@ Cardinals	3–1	Sonnanstine (6–1)	Looper (5–3)	Percival (11)	43,136	25–17
43	May 17	@ Cardinals	9–8 (10)	Franklin (2–1)	Wheeler (0–3)		43,907	25–18
44	May 18	@ Cardinals	5–4	Perez (1–0)	Glover (0–2)		46,392	25–19
45	May 19	@ Athletics	7–6 (13)	Hammel (3–2)	Gaudin (3–3)	Percival (12)	11,077	26–19
46	May 20	@ Athletics	3–2	Kazmir (3–1)	Smith (2–4)	Percival (13)	11,272	27–19
47	May 21	@ Athletics	9–1	Eveland (4–3)	Sonnanstine (6–2)		22,712	27–20
48	May 23	Orioles	2–0	Garza (3–1)	Guthrie (2–5)	Percival (14)	13,635	28–20
49	May 24	Orioles	11–4	Jackson (3–3)	Trachsel (2–5)		30,445	29–20
50	May 25	Orioles	5–4	Percival (1–0)	Sherrill (1–1)		17,762	30–20
51	May 26	Rangers	7–3	Kazmir (4–1)	Ponson (3–1)		12,174	31–20
52	May 27	Rangers	12–6	Padilla (7–2)	Sonnanstine (6–3)		10,511	31–21
53	May 28	Rangers	5–3	Garza (4–1)	Gabbard (1–2)	Wheeler (1)	10,927	32–21
54	May 29	White Sox	5–1	Danks (4–4)	Jackson (3–4)		12,636	32–22
55	May 30	White Sox	2–1	Wheeler (1–3)	Linebrink (2–1)		14,679	33–22
56	May 31	White Sox	2–0	Kazmir (5–1)	Vázquez (5–4)	Balfour (1)	36,048	34–22

June (16–10)

#	Date	Opponent	Score	Win	Loss	Save	Attendance	Record
57	June 1	White Sox	4–3 (10)	Howell (4–0)	Thornton (1–1)		24,720	35–22
58	June 3	@ Red Sox	7–4	Masterson (2–0)	Garza (4–2)	Papelbon (17)	37,823	35–23
59	June 4	@ Red Sox	5–1	Beckett (6–4)	Jackson (3–5)		37,474	35–24
60	June 5	@ Red Sox	7–1	Lester (4–3)	Shields (4–4)		37,639	35–25
61	June 6	@ Rangers	12–4	Kazmir (6–1)	Padilla (7–3)		21,783	36–25
62	June 7	@ Rangers	5–4	Howell (5–0)	Benoit (3–2)	Wheeler (2)	28,788	37–25
63	June 8	@ Rangers	6–3	Mathis (2–1)	Garza (4–3)		20,258	37–26
64	June 9	@ Angels	13–4	Jackson (4–5)	Saunders (9–3)		42,019	38–26
65	June 10	@ Angels	6–1	Weaver (6–6)	Shields (4–5)		37,610	38–27
66	June 11	@ Angels	4–2	Lackey (6–6)	Kazmir (6–2)	Rodríguez (27)	36,622	38–28
67	June 13	Marlins	7–3	Sonnanstine (7–3)	Tucker (1–1)		19,312	39–28
68	June 14	Marlins	4–1	Garza (5–3)	Hendrickson (7–5)	Percival (15)	31,195	40–28
69	June 15	Marlins	9–3	Nolasco (7–4)	Jackson (4–6)		28,886	40–29
70	June 17	Cubs	3–2	Balfour (1–0)	Cotts (0–1)	Percival (16)	31,607	41–29
71	June 18	Cubs	5–4	Sonnanstine (8–3)	Zambrano (8–3)	Percival (17)	31,496	42–29
72	June 19	Cubs	8–3	Balfour (2–0)	Mármol (1–2)		34,441	43–29
73	June 20	Astros	4–3	Oswalt (6–7)	Garza (5–4)	Valverde (17)	14,741	43–30
74	June 21	Astros	4–3	Wheeler (2–3)	Brocail (2–3)		29,953	44–30
75	June 22	Astros	3–2	Backe (5–8)	Kazmir (6–3)	Valverde (18)	19,778	44–31
76	June 24	@ Marlins	6–4	Howell (6–0)	Pinto (2–3)	Percival (18)	12,352	45–31
77	June 25	@ Marlins	15–3	Shields (5–5)	Tucker (2–2)		13,165	46–31
78	June 26	@ Marlins	6–1	Garza (6–4)	Hendrickson (7–6)		17,107	47–31
79	June 27	@ Pirates	10–5	Kazmir (7–3)	Barthmaier (0–1)		19,970	48–31
80	June 28	@ Pirates	4–3 (13)	Van Benschoten (1–2)	Hammel (3–3)		17,790	48–32
81	June 29	@ Pirates	4–3	Sonnanstine (9–3)	Yates (3–1)	Percival (19)	15,828	49–32
82	June 30	Red Sox	5–4	Shields (6–5)	Masterson (4–2)	Howell (2)	34,145	50–32

July (13–12)

#	Date	Opponent	Score	Win	Loss	Save	Attendance	Record
83	July 1	Red Sox	3–1	Garza (7–4)	Wakefield (5–6)	Balfour (2)	31,112	51–32
84	July 2	Red Sox	7–6	Glover (1–2)	Hansen (1–3)	Wheeler (3)	36,048	52–32
85	July 4	Royals	11–2	Jackson (5–6)	Bannister (7–8)		16,830	53–32
86	July 5	Royals	3–0	Sonnanstine (10–3)	Greinke (7–5)	Balfour (3)	30,418	54–32
87	July 6	Royals	9–2	Shields (7–5)	Hochevar (6–5)		20,587	55–32
88	July 7	Royals	7–4	Soria (1–1)	Wheeler (2–4)		16,293	55–33
89	July 8	@ Yankees	5–0	Pettitte (10–6)	Kazmir (7–4)		53,089	55–34
90	July 9	@ Yankees	2–1 (10)	Rivera (4–3)	Balfour (2–1)		53,552	55–35
91	July 10	@ Indians	13–2	Laffey (5–5)	Sonnanstine (10–4)		22,665	55–36
92	July 11	@ Indians	5–0	Lee (12–2)	Shields (7–6)		33,633	55–37
93	July 12	@ Indians	8–4	Ginter (1–0)	Garza (7–5)		35,706	55–38
94	July 13	@ Indians	5–2	Mastny (1–2)	Kazmir (7–5)	Kobayashi (5)	29,700	55–39
95	July 18	Blue Jays	2–1	Shields (8–6)	Burnett (10–9)	Balfour (4)	23,706	56–39
96	July 19	Blue Jays	6–4	Garza (8–5)	Halladay (11–7)	Wheeler (4)	32,669	57–39
97	July 20	Blue Jays	9–4	Camp (3–1)	Jackson (5–7)		21,037	57–40
98	July 21	Athletics	4–0	Kazmir (8–5)	Eveland (7–7)		12,428	58–40
99	July 22	Athletics	8–1	Braden (2–0)	Sonnanstine (10–5)		16,800	58–41
100	July 23	Athletics	4–3	Shields (9–6)	Smith (5–9)	Percival (20)	23,437	59–41
101	July 24	@ Royals	4–2	Meche (8–9)	Garza (8–6)	Soria (27)	25,900	59–42
102	July 25	@ Royals	5–3	Jackson (6–7)	Bannister (7–9)	Percival (21)	31,535	60–42
103	July 26	@ Royals	5–3	Reyes (2–2)	Ramírez (1–1)	Percival (22)	24,322	61–42
104	July 27	@ Royals	6–1	Davies (4–2)	Sonnanstine (10–6)		13,779	61–43
105	July 28	@ Blue Jays	3–1	Burnett	Shields (9–7)	Ryan (20)	23,476	61–44
106	July 29	@ Blue Jays	3–0	Garza (9–6)	Halladay (12–8)		26,791	62–44
107	July 30	@ Blue Jays	3–2	Jackson (7–7)	Richmond (0–1)	Percival (23)	40,322	63–44

August (21–7)

#	Date	Opponent	Score	Win	Loss	Save	Attendance	Record
108	August 1	Tigers	5–2	Balfour (3–1)	Miner (5–4)	Percival (24)	26,403	64–44
109	August 2	Tigers	9–3	Sonnanstine (11–6)	Rogers (8–8)		36,048	65–44
110	August 3	Tigers	6–5 (10)	Miller (1–0)	Rodney (0–3)		33,438	66–44
111	August 4	Indians	5–2	Lee (15–2)	Garza (9–7)	Pérez (2)	17,049	66–45
112	August 5	Indians	8–4	Jackson (8–7)	Carmona (5–4)		20,063	67–45
113	August 6	Indians	10–7	Percival (2–0)	Kobayashi (5–4)		27,533	68–45
114	August 7	@ Mariners	2–1	Putz (5–4)	Wheeler (2–5)		25,423	68–46
115	August 8	@ Mariners	5–3	Shields (10–7)	Silva (4–13)	Percival (25)	30,220	69–46
116	August 9	@ Mariners	8–7 (11)	Bradford (4–3)	Batista (4–12)	Percival (26)	27,905	70–46
117	August 10	@ Mariners	11–3	Jackson (9–7)	Dickey (3–7)		30,336	71–46
118	August 12	@ Athletics	2–1	Gonzalez (1–1)	Kazmir (8–6)	Ziegler (2)	14,284	71–47
119	August 13	@ Athletics	3–2	Sonnanstine (12–6)	Duchscherer (10–8)	Percival (27)	21,438	72–47
120	August 14	@ Athletics	7–6 (12)	Hammel (4–3)	Casilla (1–0)	Miller (1)	16,689	73–47
121	August 15	@ Rangers	7–0	Garza (10–7)	Millwood (6–7)		20,233	74–47
122	August 16	@ Rangers	3–0	Harrison (5–2)	Jackson (9–8)	Guardado (4)	29,238	74–48
123	August 17	@ Rangers	7–4	Kazmir (9–6)	Nippert (1–3)	Wheeler (5)	18,363	75–48
124	August 18	Angels	6–4	Sonnanstine (13–6)	Garland (11–8)	Wheeler (6)	15,896	76–48
125	August 19	Angels	4–2	Shields (11–7)	Shields (5–4)	Wheeler (7)	15,902	77–48
126	August 20	Angels	5–4	Arredondo (5–1)	Balfour (3–2)	Rodríguez (48)	19,157	77–49
127	August 22	@ White Sox	9–4	Jackson (10–8)	Danks (10–6)		38,747	78–49
128	August 23	@ White Sox	5–3	Balfour (4–2)	Vázquez (10–11)	Wheeler (8)	36,482	79–49
129	August 24	@ White Sox	6–5 (10)	Jenks (3–0)	Hammel (4–4)		38,562	79–50
130	August 26	Blue Jays	6–2	Halladay (16–9)	Shields (11–8)		13,478	79–51
131	August 27	Blue Jays	1–0	Garza (11–7)	Purcey (2–5)	Wheeler (9)	12,678	80–51
132	August 28	Blue Jays	3–2	Jackson (11–8)	Litsch (9–8)	Wheeler (10)	14,039	81–51
133	August 29	Orioles	14–3	Kazmir (10–6)	Guthrie (10–11)		21,439	82–51
134	August 30	Orioles	10–9	Wheeler (3–5)	Cherry (0–2)		34,805	83–51
135	August 31	Orioles	10–4	Shields (12–8)	Burres (7–9)		32,379	84–51

September (13–14)

#	Date	Opponent	Score	Win	Loss	Save	Attendance	Record
136	September 2	Yankees	7–2	Mussina (17–7)	Garza (11–8)		21,629	84–52
137	September 3	Yankees	8–4	Ramírez (5–1)	Jackson (11–9)		25,215	84–53
138	September 4	Yankees	7–5	Kazmir (11–6)	Rasner (5–10)	Wheeler (11)	26,080	85–53
139	September 5	@ Blue Jays	6–4	Halladay (18–9)	Sonnanstine (13–7)	Ryan (27)	32,477	85–54
140	September 6	@ Blue Jays	7–4 (13)	Tallet (1–1)	Percival (2–1)		34,469	85–55
141	September 7	@ Blue Jays	1–0	Purcey (3–5)	Garza (11–9)	Carlson (2)	39,854	85–56
142	September 8	@ Red Sox	3–0	Lester (14–5)	Jackson (11–10)	Papelbon (36)	37,662	85–57
143	September 9	@ Red Sox	5–4	Wheeler (4–5)	Papelbon (5–4)	Percival (28)	37,573	86–57
144	September 10	@ Red Sox	4–2	Miller (2–0)	Timlin (4–4)	Hammel (1)	38,114	87–57
	September 12	@ Yankees	Postponed (rain) Rescheduled for September 13					
145	September 13	@ Yankees	7–1	Shields (13–8)	Mussina (17–9)		54,088	88–57
146	September 13	@ Yankees	6–5	Marte (5–3)	Howell (6–1)	Rivera (34)	53,568	88–58
147	September 14	@ Yankees	8–4	Pavano (3–1)	Jackson (11–11)	Rivera (35)	54,279	88–59
148	September 15	Red Sox	13–5	Matsuzaka (17–2)	Kazmir (11–7)		29,772	88–60
149	September 16	Red Sox	2–1	Wheeler (5–5)	Masterson (6–5)		32,079	89–60
150	September 17	Red Sox	10–3	Balfour (5–2)	Wakefield (9–11)		36,048	90–60
151	September 18	Twins	11–8	Guardado (4–4)	Wheeler (5–6)	Nathan (37)	17,296	90–61
152	September 19	Twins	11–1	Jackson (12–11)	Blackburn (11–10)		28,306	91–61
153	September 20	Twins	7–2	Kazmir (12–7)	Slowey (12–11)		36,048	92–61
154	September 21	Twins	4–1	Liriano (6–3)	Sonnanstine (13–8)	Nathan (38)	36,048	92–62
155	September 22	@ Orioles	4–2	Balfour (6–2)	Cherry (0–3)	Wheeler (12)	12,489	93–62
156	September 23	@ Orioles	5–2	Shields (14–8)	Olson (9–10)	Wheeler (13)	15,215	94–62
157	September 23	@ Orioles	7–5	Niemann (2–1)	Walker (1–3)	Howell (3)	15,215	95–62
158	September 24	@ Orioles	11–6	Jackson (13–11)	Burres (7–10)	Miller (2)	13,632	96–62
159	September 25	@ Tigers	7–5	Galarraga (13–6)	Kazmir (12–8)	Rodney (11)	36,259	96–63
160	September 26	@ Tigers	6–4	Verlander (11–17)	Sonnanstine (13–9)	Rodney (12)	39,617	96–64
161	September 27	@ Tigers	4–3	López (4–1)	Niemann (2–2)	Rodney (13)	40,756	96–65
162	September 28	@ Tigers	8–7 (11)	Jackson (14–11)	Lambert (1–2)	Hammel (2)	40,373	97–65

=== Postseason ===
2008 Postseason
American League Division Series

Game	Date	Opponent	Score	Win	Loss	Save	Location/Attendance	Series
1	October 2	White Sox	6–4	Shields (1–0)	Vázquez (0–1)	Wheeler (1)	Tropicana Field; 35,041	1–0
2	October 3	White Sox	6–2	Kazmir (1–0)	Buehrle (0–1)		Tropicana Field; 35,257	2–0
3	October 5	@ White Sox	5–3	Danks (1–0)	Garza (0–1)	Jenks (1)	U.S. Cellular Field; 40,142	2–1
4	October 6	@ White Sox	6–2	Sonnanstine (1–0)	Floyd (0–1)		U.S. Cellular Field; 40,453	3–1

American League Championship Series

Game	Date	Opponent	Score	Win	Loss	Save	Location/Attendance	Series
1	October 10	Red Sox	2–0	Matsuzaka (1–0)	Shields (0–1)	Papelbon (1)	Tropicana Field; 35,001	0–1
2	October 11	Red Sox	9–8 (11)	Price (1–0)	Timlin (0–1)		Tropicana Field; 34,904	1–1
3	October 13	@ Red Sox	9–1	Garza (1–0)	Lester (0–1)		Fenway Park; 38,301	2–1
4	October 14	@ Red Sox	13–4	Sonnanstine (1–0)	Wakefield (0–1)		Fenway Park; 38,133	3–1
5	October 16	@ Red Sox	8–7	Masterson (1–0)	Howell (0–1)		Fenway Park; 38,437	3–2
6	October 18	Red Sox	4–2	Beckett (1–0)	Shields (0–2)	Papelbon (2)	Tropicana Field; 40,947	3–3
7	October 19	Red Sox	3–1	Garza (2–0)	Lester (0–2)	Price (1)	Tropicana Field; 40,473	4–3

World Series

Game	Date	Opponent	Score	Win	Loss	Save	Location/Attendance	Series
1	October 22	Phillies	3–2	Hamels (1–0)	Kazmir (0–1)	Lidge (1)	Tropicana Field; 40,783	0–1
2	October 23	Phillies	4–2	Shields (1–0)	Myers (0–1)		Tropicana Field; 40,843	1–1
3	October 25	@ Phillies	5–4	Romero (1–0)	Howell (0–1)		Citizens Bank Park; 45,900	1–2
4	October 26	@ Phillies	10–2	Blanton (1–0)	Sonnanstine (0–1)		Citizens Bank Park; 45,903	1–3
5	October 27 & 29	@ Phillies	4–3	Romero (2–0)	Howell (0–2)	Lidge (2)	Citizens Bank Park; 45,940	1–4

== Player stats ==
Note: Team leaders in each category are noted in bold.

=== Batting ===
Note: G = Games played; AB = At bats; R = Runs scored; H = Hits; 2B = Doubles; 3B = Triples; HR = Home runs; RBI = Runs batted in; AVG = Batting average; SB = Stolen bases

Player	G	AB	R	H	2B	3B	HR	RBI	AVG	SB
Willy Aybar	95	324	33	82	17	2	10	33	.253	2
Rocco Baldelli	28	80	12	21	5	0	4	13	.263	0
Jason Bartlett	128	454	48	130	25	3	1	37	.286	20
Reid Brignac	4	10	1	0	0	0	0	0	.000	0
Andy Cannizaro	1	1	0	0	0	0	0	0	.000	0
Carl Crawford	109	443	69	121	12	**10**	8	57	.273	25
Mike DiFelice	7	20	1	6	1	0	0	4	.300	0
Cliff Floyd	80	246	32	66	13	0	11	39	.268	1
Jonny Gomes	77	154	23	28	5	1	8	21	.182	8
Gabe Gross	127	302	40	73	13	3	13	38	.242	2
Nathan Haynes	20	44	3	10	0	0	0	3	.227	4
Michel Hernández	5	15	2	3	0	0	0	0	.200	0
Eric Hinske	133	381	59	94	21	1	20	60	.247	10
Akinori Iwamura	**152**	**627**	**91**	**172**	30	9	6	48	**.274**	8
John Jaso	5	10	2	2	0	0	0	0	.200	0
Dan Johnson	10	25	3	5	0	0	2	4	.200	0
Elliot Johnson	7	19	0	3	0	0	0	0	.158	0
Evan Longoria	122	448	67	122	31	2	27	85	.272	7
Dioner Navarro	120	427	43	126	27	0	7	54	.295	0
Carlos Peña	139	490	76	121	24	2	**31**	**102**	.247	1
Fernando Perez	23	60	18	15	2	0	3	8	.250	5
Shawn Riggans	44	135	21	30	7	0	6	24	.222	0
Justin Ruggiano	45	76	9	15	4	0	2	7	.197	2
B.J. Upton	145	531	85	145	**37**	2	9	67	.273	**44**
Ben Zobrist	62	198	32	50	10	2	12	30	.253	3
Pitcher Totals	162	21	4	3	0	0	0	1	.143	0
**Team totals**	**162**	**5541**	**774**	**1443**	**284**	**37**	**180**	**735**	**.260**	**142**

=== Pitching ===
Note: W = Wins; L = Losses; ERA = Earned run average; G = Games pitched; GS = Games started; SV = Saves; IP = Innings pitched; H = Hits allowed; R = Runs allowed; ER = Earned runs allowed; BB = Walks allowed; K = Strikeouts

Player	W	L	ERA	G	GS	SV	IP	H	R	ER	BB	K
Grant Balfour	6	2	1.54	51	0	4	58.1	28	10	10	24	82
Kurt Birkins	0	0	0.90	6	0	0	10.0	5	1	1	5	7
Chad Bradford	4	3	1.42	68	0	0	19.1	18	20	14	15	17
Scott Dohmann	2	0	6.14	12	0	0	14.2	18	10	10	7	12
Matt Garza	11	9	3.70	30	30	0	184.2	170	83	76	59	128
Gary Glover	1	2	5.82	29	0	0	34.0	42	22	22	18	22
Jason Hammel	4	4	4.60	40	5	2	78.1	83	45	40	35	44
J.P. Howell	6	1	2.22	64	0	3	89.1	62	29	22	39	92
Edwin Jackson	**14**	**11**	4.42	32	31	0	183.1	199	91	90	**77**	108
Scott Kazmir	12	8	3.49	27	27	0	152.1	123	61	59	70	**166**
Trever Miller	2	0	4.15	68	0	2	43.1	39	21	20	20	44
Jeff Niemann	2	2	5.06	5	2	0	16.0	18	12	9	8	14
Troy Percival	2	1	4.53	50	0	**28**	45.2	29	26	23	27	38
David Price	0	0	1.93	5	1	0	14.0	9	4	3	4	12
Al Reyes	2	2	4.37	26	0	0	22.2	21	12	11	10	19
Jae Kuk Ryu	0	0	0.00	1	0	0	1.1	0	0	0	1	1
Juan Salas	0	0	7.11	5	0	0	6.1	5	5	5	4	8
James Shields	**14**	8	**3.56**	33	**33**	0	**215.0**	208	94	85	40	160
Andy Sonnanstine	13	9	4.38	32	32	0	193.1	**212**	**105**	**94**	37	124
Mitch Talbot	0	0	11.17	3	1	0	9.2	16	12	12	11	5
Dan Wheeler	5	6	3.12	**70**	0	13	66.1	44	25	23	22	53
**Team totals**	**97**	**65**	**3.82**	**162**	**162**	**52**	**1457.2**	**1349**	**671**	**618**	**526**	**1143**

=== Roster ===
2008 Tampa Bay Rays
**Roster**
**Pitchers**: 50 Grant Balfour; 24 Kurt Birkins; 53 Chad Bradford; 27 Scott Dohmann; 22 Matt Garza; 47 Gary Glover; 49 Jason Hammel; 39 J. P. Howell; 36 Edwin Jackson; 19 Scott Kazmir; 57 Trever Miller; 34 Jeff Niemann; 40 Troy Percival; 14 David Price; 28 Al Reyes; 11 Jae Kuk Ryu; 52 Juan Salas; 33 James Shields; 21 Andy Sonnanstine; 51 Mitch Talbot; 35 Dan Wheeler	**Catchers**: 20 Mike DiFelice; 41 Michel Hernández; 28 John Jaso; 30 Dioner Navarro; 9 Shawn Riggans; **Infielders**: 16 Willy Aybar; 8 Jason Bartlett; 44 Reid Brignac; 41 Andy Cannizaro; 1 Akinori Iwamura; 24 Dan Johnson; 43 Elliot Johnson; 3 Evan Longoria; 23 Carlos Peña; 18 Ben Zobrist	**Outfielders**: 5 Rocco Baldelli; 13 Carl Crawford; 31 Jonny Gomes; 26 Gabe Gross; 37 Nathan Haynes; 32 Eric Hinske; 38 Fernando Perez; 10 Justin Ruggiano; 2 B. J. Upton; **Other batters**: 15 Cliff Floyd	**Manager**: 70 Joe Maddon; **Coaches**: 72 Tim Bogar; 6 Tom Foley (third base); 55 Steve Henderson (hitting); 25 George Hendrick (first base); 48 Jim Hickey (pitching); 4 Dave Martinez (bench); 7 Bobby Ramos (bullpen); 60 Don Zimmer (senior advisor)

== Farm system ==
Level	Team	League	Manager
AAA	Durham Bulls	International League	Charlie Montoyo
AA	Montgomery Biscuits	Southern League	Billy Gardner Jr.
A	Vero Beach Devil Rays	Florida State League	Jim Morrison
A	Columbus Catfish	South Atlantic League	Matt Quatraro
A-Short Season	Hudson Valley Renegades	New York–Penn League	Joe Alvarez
Rookie	Princeton Rays	Appalachian League	Joe Szekely
