= 2008 American League Championship Series =

39th edition of Major League Baseball's American League Championship Series

| Team (Wins) | Managers | Season |
|---|---|---|
| Tampa Bay Rays (4) | Joe Maddon | 97–65 (.599), GA: 2 |
| Boston Red Sox (3) | Terry Francona | 95–67 (.586), GB: 2 |
- Dates: October 10–19
- MVP: Matt Garza (Tampa Bay)
- Umpires: Tim McClelland (crew chief), Sam Holbrook, Brian O'Nora, Brian Gorman, Alfonso Márquez, Derryl Cousins, Ángel Hernández (Game 7 replacement for Cousins)

Broadcast
- Television: TBS; MLB International
- TV announcers: Chip Caray, Ron Darling, Buck Martinez, and Craig Sager (TBS); Dave O'Brien and Rick Sutcliffe (MLB International)
- Radio: ESPN
- Radio announcers: Jon Miller and Joe Morgan
- ALDS: Boston Red Sox over Los Angeles Angels of Anaheim (3–1); Tampa Bay Rays over Chicago White Sox (3–1)

The 2008 American League Championship Series (ALCS) was the best-of-seven playoff series pitting the second-seeded Tampa Bay Rays against the fourth-seeded and defending World Series champion Boston Red Sox for the American League pennant. Tampa Bay held the home field advantage.

The Rays won the series four games to three, becoming the first team since the 1992 Atlanta Braves to win a seventh game after blowing a 3–1 series lead. The series began at Tropicana Field in St. Petersburg, Florida, on Friday, October 10, 2008, and was broadcast on TBS. Game 7 was played on Sunday, October 19. This was the Rays' first appearance in the ALCS while the Red Sox were making their fourth appearance in the last six seasons and ninth overall. The two teams hit a combined 26 home runs—a record for league championship series.

The Rays would go on to lose the World Series to the Philadelphia Phillies in five games.

== Background ==
=== Tampa Bay Rays ===
In spring training before the start of the 2008 season, James Shields and B.J. Upton joked with each other that the goal for the newly branded Rays (they had just changed their name from the Devil Rays) was to not lose 100 games — after narrowly avoiding this mark in 2007 with 96 losses. Veteran and former World Series champion Cliff Floyd, who had signed with the team in the off-season at age 35, contemplated retirement after the first few days of spring training. “You’re wondering, ‘What the hell are you doing?'”, said Floyd in 2018 at the team’s ten year-anniversary. With a payroll of only $43.8 million, the second lowest in the majors, Tampa Bay entered the season facing 125–1 odds to win the AL pennant and 300–1 odds to win the World Series. But the franchise that never had finished above .500 or reached the postseason in their brief 11-year history, improbably won the American League East over the New York Yankees ($209 million payroll) and Boston Red Sox ($133.4 million). To get to their first ALCS appearance in franchise history, they beat the White Sox in four games in the ALDS.

=== Boston Red Sox ===
Finishing 2nd in the American League East were the defending champion Boston Red Sox. After being a season-long running distraction in the clubhouse, GM Theo Epstein traded superstar Manny Ramirez to the Dodgers in a blockbuster three-way deal. In the deal, the Red Sox acquired outfielder Jason Bay and minor league infielder Josh Wilson, while the Pittsburgh Pirates received infielder Andy LaRoche and pitching prospect Bryan Morris from the Dodgers and outfielder Brandon Moss and pitcher Craig Hansen from the Red Sox. The acquisition of Jason Bay proved to be a wake-up call for the defending champs, as they finished with a 34–19 record after the trade and qualified for the postseason as a wild card. In the ALDS, they upset the Angels in four games.

== Summary ==
=== Tampa Bay Rays vs. Boston Red Sox ===
Tampa Bay won the series, 4–3.

| Game | Date | Score | Location | Time | Attendance |
|---|---|---|---|---|---|
| 1 | October 10 | Boston Red Sox – 2, Tampa Bay Rays – 0 | Tropicana Field | 3:25 | 35,001 |
| 2 | October 11 | Boston Red Sox – 8, Tampa Bay Rays – 9 (11) | Tropicana Field | 5:27 | 34,904 |
| 3 | October 13 | Tampa Bay Rays – 9, Boston Red Sox – 1 | Fenway Park | 3:23 | 38,031 |
| 4 | October 14 | Tampa Bay Rays – 13, Boston Red Sox – 4 | Fenway Park | 3:07 | 38,133 |
| 5 | October 16 | Tampa Bay Rays – 7, Boston Red Sox – 8 | Fenway Park | 4:08 | 38,437 |
| 6 | October 18 | Boston Red Sox – 4, Tampa Bay Rays – 2 | Tropicana Field | 3:48 | 40,947 |
| 7 | October 19 | Boston Red Sox – 1, Tampa Bay Rays – 3 | Tropicana Field | 3:31 | 40,473 |

== Game summaries ==
=== Game 1 ===
October 10, 2008 8:39 pm (EDT) at Tropicana Field in St. Petersburg, Florida 73 °F (23 °C), dome
| Team | 1 | 2 | 3 | 4 | 5 | 6 | 7 | 8 | 9 | R | H | E |
|---|---|---|---|---|---|---|---|---|---|---|---|---|
| Boston | 0 | 0 | 0 | 0 | 1 | 0 | 0 | 1 | 0 | 2 | 7 | 0 |
| Tampa Bay | 0 | 0 | 0 | 0 | 0 | 0 | 0 | 0 | 0 | 0 | 4 | 0 |
WP: Daisuke Matsuzaka (1–0) LP: James Shields (0–1) Sv: Jonathan Papelbon (1); Attendance: 35,001; Boxscore

Boston won a pitcher's duel on a sacrifice fly by Jed Lowrie in the fifth off James Shields and an RBI double by Kevin Youkilis in the eighth off J. P. Howell with the run charged to Shields. Starter Daisuke Matsuzaka held the Rays hitless until Carl Crawford singled to lead off the seventh inning. He allowed four singles and five walks in seven innings while striking out nine. Jonathan Papelbon pitched a perfect ninth for his fourth career ALCS save.

=== Game 2 ===
October 11, 2008 8:08 pm (EDT) at Tropicana Field in St. Petersburg, Florida 73 °F (23 °C), dome
| Team | 1 | 2 | 3 | 4 | 5 | 6 | 7 | 8 | 9 | 10 | 11 | R | H | E |
|---|---|---|---|---|---|---|---|---|---|---|---|---|---|---|
| Boston | 2 | 0 | 1 | 0 | 3 | 1 | 0 | 1 | 0 | 0 | 0 | 8 | 12 | 0 |
| Tampa Bay | 2 | 0 | 2 | 1 | 3 | 0 | 0 | 0 | 0 | 0 | 1 | 9 | 12 | 0 |
WP: David Price (1–0) LP: Mike Timlin (0–1); Home runs: BOS: Dustin Pedroia 2 (2), Kevin Youkilis (1), Jason Bay (1); TB: Evan Longoria (1), B. J. Upton (1), Cliff Floyd (1); Attendance: 34,904; Boxscore

The Rays won a hard-hitting, marathon game that lasted 5 hours and 27 minutes, and featured seven home runs, which broke the ALCS record and tied the all-time LCS record. Starters Scott Kazmir and Josh Beckett were both ineffective, giving up six of those home runs and lasting under five innings.

In the top of the first, David Ortiz walked and Kevin Youkilis singled with two outs before both scored on Jason Bay's double, but in the bottom of the inning, Carlos Pena doubled with two outs before Evan Longoria's home run tied the game. Dustin Pedroia's leadoff home run in the third put the Red Sox up 3−2, but in the bottom of the inning, B. J. Upton's one-out home run tied the game again, then Longoria doubled with two outs before scoring on Carl Crawford's single to put the Rays up 4–3. Cliff Floyd's leadoff home run in the fourth extended the Rays' lead to 5–3, but home runs by Pedroia and Youkilis in the fifth tied the game. Grant Balfour relieved Kazmir and allowed a home run to Bay to put the Red Sox up 6–5. In the bottom of the inning, Upton walked with one out, stole second and scored on Pena's single to tie the game. Longoria's RBI double then put the Rays up 7–6. Javier Lopez relieved Beckett and allowed an RBI single to Crawford. Bay's single in the seventh off Chad Bradford scored Pedroia, who walked off J. P. Howell with one out earlier that inning. A wild pitch by Dan Wheeler in the eighth allowed Pedroia, who singled to lead off the inning off Bradford, to score and tie the game, forcing extra innings. In the bottom of the 11th, Mike Timlin walked three to load the bases before a sacrifice fly by Upton allowed Fernando Perez to score the winning run. The Rays' 2007 #1 draft pick, David Price, was credited with the win.

=== Game 3 ===
October 13, 2008 4:39 pm (EDT) at Fenway Park in Boston, Massachusetts 60 °F (16 °C), clear
| Team | 1 | 2 | 3 | 4 | 5 | 6 | 7 | 8 | 9 | R | H | E |
|---|---|---|---|---|---|---|---|---|---|---|---|---|
| Tampa Bay | 0 | 1 | 4 | 0 | 0 | 0 | 0 | 3 | 1 | 9 | 13 | 0 |
| Boston | 0 | 0 | 0 | 0 | 0 | 0 | 1 | 0 | 0 | 1 | 7 | 0 |
WP: Matt Garza (1–0) LP: Jon Lester (0–1); Home runs: TB: B. J. Upton (2), Evan Longoria (2), Rocco Baldelli (1), Carlos Peña (1); BOS: None; Attendance: 38,031; Boxscore

The Rays hit Boston ace Jon Lester and reliever Paul Byrd hard in Game 3, moving ahead two games to one. The Rays scored their first run in the second on Dioner Navarro's RBI groundout with runners on second and third. Next inning, B. J. Upton hit a towering three-run homer over the Green Monster to make it 4–0. Evan Longoria followed with a home run later in the inning to make it 5–0. Tampa Bay starter Matt Garza pitched brilliantly against the Red Sox lineup. The 3–4–5 hitters went 0–9 against him and the Red Sox's only run came in the seventh on Jacoby Ellsbury's sacrifice fly off J. P. Howell that scored Jason Varitek, who walked off Garza to lead off the inning. In the eighth, New England native Rocco Baldelli hit a three-run homer of his own, also over the Green Monster, off Byrd to seal the win. Carlos Peña homered in the ninth, also off Byrd to extend his postseason success.

=== Game 4 ===
October 14, 2008 8:08 pm (EDT) at Fenway Park in Boston, Massachusetts 60 °F (16 °C), mostly clear
| Team | 1 | 2 | 3 | 4 | 5 | 6 | 7 | 8 | 9 | R | H | E |
|---|---|---|---|---|---|---|---|---|---|---|---|---|
| Tampa Bay | 3 | 0 | 2 | 0 | 1 | 5 | 0 | 2 | 0 | 13 | 14 | 3 |
| Boston | 0 | 0 | 1 | 0 | 0 | 0 | 1 | 2 | 0 | 4 | 7 | 0 |
WP: Andy Sonnanstine (1–0) LP: Tim Wakefield (0–1); Home runs: TB: Carlos Peña (2), Evan Longoria (3), Willy Aybar (1); BOS: Kevin Cash (1); Attendance: 38,133; Boxscore

The Rays routed the defending World Champions for the second straight night with a 13–4 win in Boston. Carlos Peña got it going in the first with a two-run homer off starter Tim Wakefield. Evan Longoria followed it up with his third homer of the series and fifth in the playoffs. Willy Aybar hit his first home run of the postseason in the third when he sent one over the Green Monster for a two-run homer. Kevin Cash's leadoff home run in the third off Rays starter Andy Sonnanstine put the Red Sox on the board. In the fifth, Carl Crawford doubled with one out in the fifth off Justin Masterson and scored on Aybar's single. Next inning, Jason Bartlett tripled with one out off Manny Delcarmen.

After Akinori Iwamura walked, B. J. Upton's RBI single made it 7–1 Rays. Delcarmen walked two to load the bases and force in another run before being relieved by Javier Lopez, who allowed back-to-back RBI singles to Crawford and Aybar, then an RBI groundout to Navarro. In the bottom of the inning, David Ortiz hit a leadoff triple and scored on Kevin Youkilis's groundout. In the eighth, Mike Timlin walked Pena to lead off the inning, then allowed an RBI triple to Crawford and RBI single to Aybar. In the bottom of the inning, Jed Lowrie hit a leadoff single, moved to second on a groundout and scored on Dustin Pedroia's single. Trever Miller relieved Sonnastine and allowed a two-out RBI double to Youkilis. Edwin Jackson pitched a scoreless ninth as the Rays were one win away from the World Series. Carl Crawford went 5-for-5 with two stolen bases in the game.

=== Game 5 ===
October 16, 2008 8:08 pm (EDT) at Fenway Park in Boston, Massachusetts 66 °F (19 °C), overcast
| Team | 1 | 2 | 3 | 4 | 5 | 6 | 7 | 8 | 9 | R | H | E |
|---|---|---|---|---|---|---|---|---|---|---|---|---|
| Tampa Bay | 2 | 0 | 3 | 0 | 0 | 0 | 2 | 0 | 0 | 7 | 8 | 1 |
| Boston | 0 | 0 | 0 | 0 | 0 | 0 | 4 | 3 | 1 | 8 | 11 | 0 |
WP: Justin Masterson (1–0) LP: J. P. Howell (0–1); Home runs: TB: B. J. Upton (3), Carlos Peña (3), Evan Longoria (4); BOS: David Ortiz (1), J. D. Drew (1); Attendance: 38,437; Boxscore

Tampa Bay jumped out to an early lead when B. J. Upton hit a two-run home run with no one out in the first inning. Carlos Peña and Evan Longoria increased the lead to 5–0 with back-to-back home runs in the third, the former a two-run shot. With his home run, Longoria tied Carlos Beltrán's record for consecutive postseason games with a home run. Daisuke Matsuzaka allowed no more runs after that through six innings, but Boston was unable to score against Scott Kazmir. In the top of the seventh, Jonathan Papelbon came on after Manny Delcarmen walked the only two batters he faced. The inherited runners scored on an Upton double, making it 7–0.

In the bottom of the seventh, with two outs and runners on first and third, Dustin Pedroia hit an RBI single off Grant Balfour to finally get the Red Sox on the board. The next batter, David Ortiz, hit a three-run home run to right field, ending a postseason home run drought of 61 at-bats. In the eighth inning, J. D. Drew hit a two-run homer to right field off Dan Wheeler. Later, Coco Crisp hit an RBI single to right field to score Mark Kotsay from second to tie the game. In the ninth inning, after J. P. Howell retired the first two Boston batters, Kevin Youkilis hit a ground ball to third base. Longoria scooped the ball, but his throw was off, and bounced into the stands, allowing Youkilis to reach second. After an intentional walk to Jason Bay, Drew hit a single over the head of right fielder Gabe Gross to win the game.

The comeback of the Red Sox from a seven-run deficit is the second-biggest in postseason history, the largest since Game 4 of the 1929 World Series, and the largest ever for a team on the brink of elimination.

=== Game 6 ===
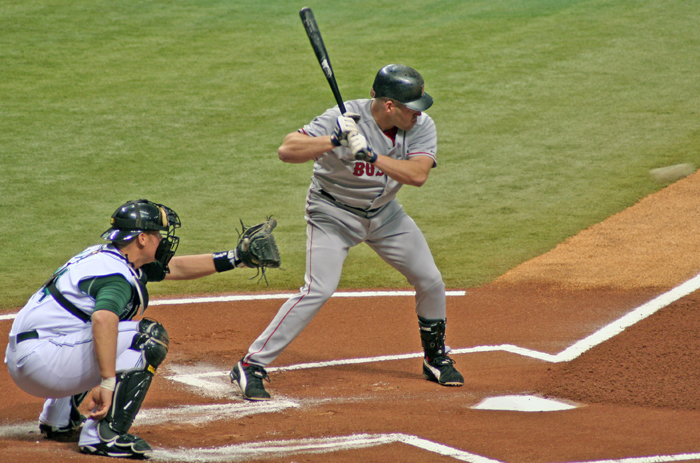
All Star Kevin Youkilis

October 18, 2008 8:08 pm (EDT) at Tropicana Field in St. Petersburg, Florida 73 °F (23 °C), dome
| Team | 1 | 2 | 3 | 4 | 5 | 6 | 7 | 8 | 9 | R | H | E |
|---|---|---|---|---|---|---|---|---|---|---|---|---|
| Boston | 0 | 1 | 1 | 0 | 0 | 2 | 0 | 0 | 0 | 4 | 10 | 0 |
| Tampa Bay | 1 | 0 | 0 | 0 | 1 | 0 | 0 | 0 | 0 | 2 | 4 | 1 |
WP: Josh Beckett (1–0) LP: James Shields (0–2) Sv: Jonathan Papelbon (2); Home runs: BOS: Kevin Youkilis (2), Jason Varitek (1); TB: B. J. Upton (4), Jason Bartlett (1); Attendance: 40,947; Boxscore

Josh Beckett pitched five innings and allowed two solo home runs, to B. J. Upton in the first and Jason Bartlett in the fifth, to record the win. Boston scored on home runs from Kevin Youkilis in the second and Jason Varitek (his first series hit) in the sixth, a Youkilis groundout in the third, and a single by David Ortiz after Bartlett's throwing error extended the sixth inning.

Umpire Derryl Cousins was struck by a foul ball from Varitek in the second inning, leaving the game with a bruised collarbone after the third. The game was delayed for 15 minutes while Cousins was X-rayed by Rays trainer Ron Porterfield; the game resumed with a five-man umpiring crew.

TBS television missed most of the game's first inning, with viewers getting a rerun of The Steve Harvey Show instead. The network picked up the game just prior to the last out in the bottom of the first, with announcer Chip Caray apologizing to viewers for "technical difficulties". TBS acknowledged there was a problem with one of their routers used in the broadcast transmission of the relay of the telecast from Atlanta. When facing elimination, Terry Francona's Red Sox have won nine of ten postseason games.

=== Game 7 ===
October 19, 2008 8:09 pm (EDT) at Tropicana Field in St. Petersburg, Florida 73 °F (23 °C), dome
| Team | 1 | 2 | 3 | 4 | 5 | 6 | 7 | 8 | 9 | R | H | E |
|---|---|---|---|---|---|---|---|---|---|---|---|---|
| Boston | 1 | 0 | 0 | 0 | 0 | 0 | 0 | 0 | 0 | 1 | 3 | 0 |
| Tampa Bay | 0 | 0 | 0 | 1 | 1 | 0 | 1 | 0 | X | 3 | 6 | 1 |
WP: Matt Garza (2–0) LP: Jon Lester (0–2) Sv: David Price (1); Home runs: BOS: Dustin Pedroia (3); TB: Willy Aybar (2); Attendance: 40,473; Boxscore

The Rays shook off the ghosts of Red Sox past to win their first American League pennant, winning a tight game 3–1. Dustin Pedroia got the Red Sox off to a good start with a one-out homer in the first off Matt Garza, but Garza settled in and delivered an MVP performance. Tampa Bay tied the game in the fourth with an Evan Longoria RBI double, then went ahead in the fifth on an RBI single by Rocco Baldelli. In the seventh, Willy Aybar added insurance with a home run to lead off. In the eighth, David Price, who made his major league debut a little over a month before came on to pitch to J. D. Drew with the bases loaded and struck him out on a checked swing. In the ninth, Price recorded his first Major League save by getting Jed Lowrie to ground into a force play to Akinori Iwamura. With the win, the Rays became the second team to go to the World Series after posting the worst record the year before, joining the 1991 Atlanta Braves, who went on to lose to the Minnesota Twins.

== Composite box ==
2008 ALCS (4–3): Tampa Bay Rays over Boston Red Sox

| Team | 1 | 2 | 3 | 4 | 5 | 6 | 7 | 8 | 9 | 10 | 11 | R | H | E |
|---|---|---|---|---|---|---|---|---|---|---|---|---|---|---|
| Tampa Bay Rays | 8 | 1 | 11 | 2 | 6 | 5 | 3 | 5 | 1 | 0 | 1 | 43 | 61 | 6 |
| Boston Red Sox | 3 | 1 | 3 | 0 | 4 | 3 | 6 | 7 | 1 | 0 | 0 | 28 | 57 | 0 |
Total attendance: 265,926 Average attendance: 37,989

== Aftermath ==
After being plagued by futility as the Devil Rays, amassing just a .399 winning percentage over their brief first 11 years as a franchise, the “worst-to-first” 2008 Rays set a new standard of success for baseball in Tampa Bay. The Rays success continued as they won at least 90 games from 2010–2013, for a team with one of the lowest payrolls in baseball in a division with the Yankees and Red Sox, the two highest spending teams at the time.

In 2011, The Red Sox became the first team in the history of Major League Baseball to have a nine-game lead in September and fail to make the postseason that season, thanks to their 7–20 record in the final month of the regular season. Their collapse allowed the Rays to sneak past them to win a wild card spot. The Red Sox avenged their 2011 collapse and 2008 ALCS series loss to the Rays in the 2013 American League Division Series, beating Tampa Bay in four games. The Red Sox would go on to win the World Series in 2013, their third championship in nine seasons. The Red Sox would later go on to beat the Rays in the 2021 American League Division Series in four games, as well.

Kevin Cash, a back-up catcher in 2008 for the Red Sox, has been the Tampa Bay Rays manager since 2015, winning the manager of the year in 2020 and 2021. Cash was also a part-time catcher for Tampa Bay in 2005.
