= B. J. Upton =

American baseball player (born 1984)

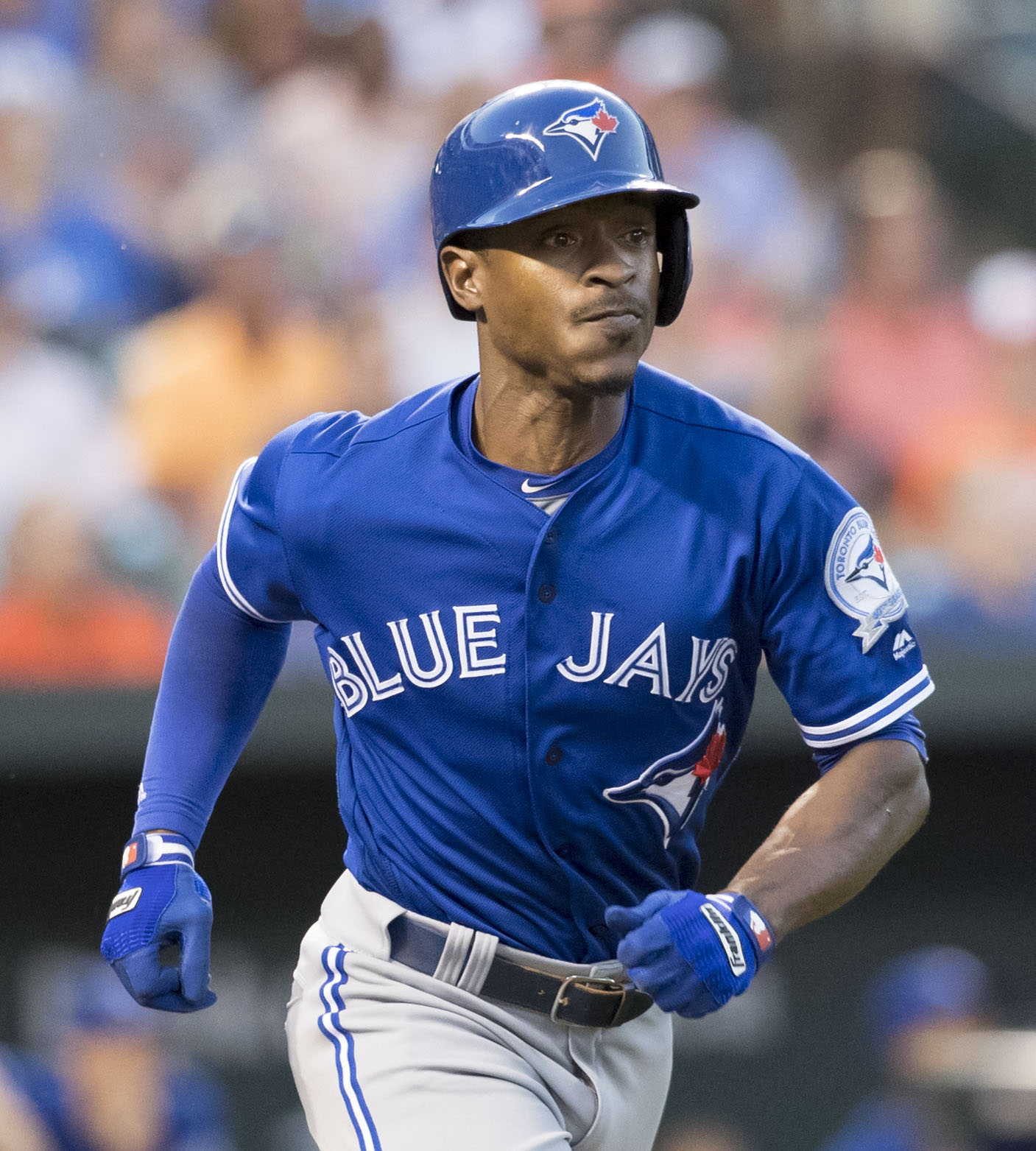
- Upton with the Blue Jays in 2016
- Center fielder
- Born: August 21, 1984 (age 42); Norfolk, Virginia, U.S.
- Batted: Right Threw: Right

MLB debut
- August 2, 2004, for the Tampa Bay Devil Rays

Last MLB appearance
- October 2, 2016, for the Toronto Blue Jays

MLB statistics
- Batting average: .243
- Home runs: 164
- Runs batted in: 586
- Stats at Baseball Reference

Teams
- Tampa Bay Devil Rays / Rays (2004, 2006–2012); Atlanta Braves (2013–2014); San Diego Padres (2015–2016); Toronto Blue Jays (2016)

Melvin Emanuel "B. J." Upton Jr. (born August 21, 1984) is an American former professional baseball center fielder. He played in Major League Baseball (MLB) for the Tampa Bay Devil Rays / Rays, Atlanta Braves, San Diego Padres, and Toronto Blue Jays.

Upton has played with his brother, Justin Upton, as members of the Atlanta Braves and San Diego Padres. They are the only two brothers in MLB history to be selected in the No. 1 and 2 slots of the draft (in separate years). The Upton brothers are also the first brothers to both hit 20 home runs and steal 20 bases in a season.

== Early life and amateur career ==
Upton was born to Melvin and Yvonne (née Gordon) Upton. Yvonne worked as a teacher and Melvin worked variously as a scout for the Kansas City Royals, a mortgage broker and a college basketball referee in the Mid-Eastern Athletic Conference after playing both college football and basketball at Norfolk State.

Before high school, Upton played on the same travel baseball team as several other MLB players, including Mark Reynolds, David Wright, and Ryan Zimmerman. Upton is a graduate of Greenbrier Christian Academy, in Chesapeake, Virginia.

As a member of the 18U United States national baseball team, Upton batted .462 (12-for-26) in nine games. The team went 9–2 and finished in second place in the Pan American Baseball Confederation in the qualifying for the 2002 World Junior Baseball Championship. In 2002, Upton was named a first-team All-American by Baseball America, batting .641 (50-for-78) with 11 doubles, four triples, 11 home runs, and 32 RBI during his senior year at Greenbrier. For his entire high school career, he hit .633 with 13 home runs, 51 RBI, 44 runs and 43 stolen bases in 47 attempts. He signed a letter of intent to play college baseball at Florida State.

== Minor leagues ==
Upton was drafted second overall as a shortstop in the 2002 Major League Baseball draft by Tampa Bay out of Greenbrier Christian Academy. He was widely considered a very polished prospect able to hit for both power and average.

Upton was ranked as the #21 prospect in baseball before the 2003 season by Baseball America, and as the #2 prospect a year later in 2004. In both 2004 and 2005, Upton was the starting shortstop in the All-Star Futures Game. In 2003, Upton committed 56 errors, leading the minor leagues.

== Major leagues ==
=== Tampa Bay Rays (2004–2012) ===
He made his major league debut on August 2, 2004, less than three weeks before his 20th birthday, becoming the youngest Ray ever and the youngest player in the major leagues in 2004. In that game against the Boston Red Sox, he went 1-for-3 with a walk, with his hit being a seventh-inning single. His younger brother, Justin, was taken with the top overall choice of the 2005 Major League Baseball draft, making them the highest-drafted siblings of all time. In 2004, he started 16 games at shortstop, 11 at third base, and one in left field. He spent the 2005 season with the Rays' Triple-A affiliate the Durham Bulls, appearing in 139 games. He returned to the major leagues in 2006, starting 48 games, all at third base.

In 2007, Upton emerged from spring training as the Rays' starting second baseman. On June 8, Upton was forced to leave a game against the Florida Marlins early due to a strained left quadriceps. The injury forced him out of action until July 13. Before the injury, he was batting .320/.396/.545 with nine home runs. Starting 48 games at second base in 2007, he committed 12 errors, fifth in the league for the year. Although he played mostly second base until the injury, Upton became the team's starting center fielder upon returning.

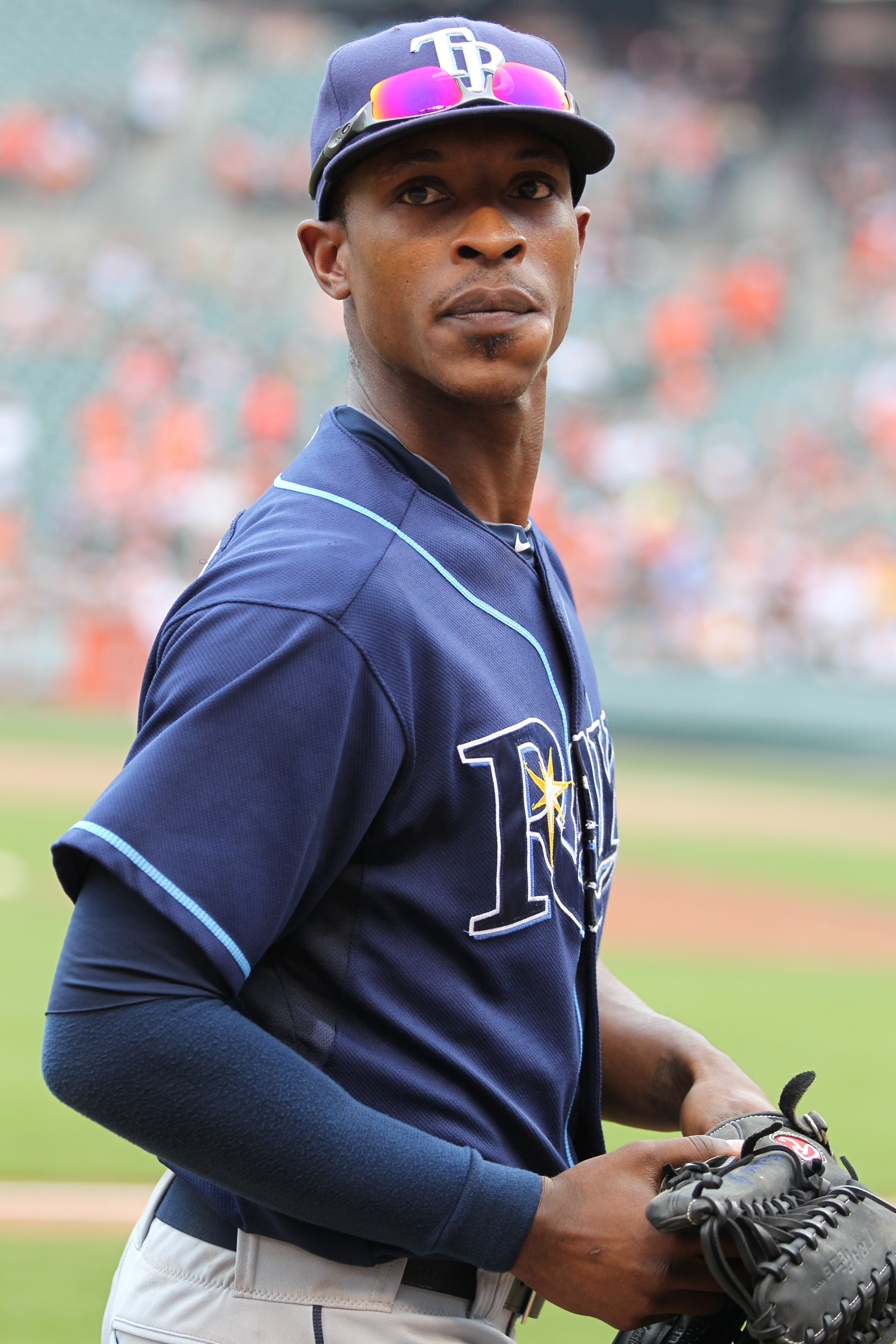
Upton with the Tampa Bay Rays in 2011

In 2007, he had 24 home runs, and was 22 out of 30 in stolen base attempts. He was one of only 6 batters in the AL to have at least 20 home runs and 20 stolen bases, along with Alex Rodriguez, Gary Sheffield, Ian Kinsler, Grady Sizemore, and Curtis Granderson.

During the 2008 season, Upton was twice disciplined by Rays manager Joe Maddon for lack of hustle. On August 6, Upton was held out of the lineup for failing to run out a ground ball the night before. On August 15, Upton was benched in the sixth inning for not running out a double play ball. He was replaced by Justin Ruggiano. A few days later, Upton hit a ball to left field that bounced off the wall. From the crack of the bat, Upton reacted to it as a home run, dropping the bat and casually jogging down the first base line. He then tried to stretch it into a double and was thrown out by the left fielder. He was not benched for this incident, however. Joe Maddon was interviewed and called it "just a mental mistake".

Upton hit .273 with just nine home runs and 44 stolen bases in 2008 (second in the AL; while he led the AL in times caught stealing, with 16). However, he would become one of the team's postseason heroes, as he hit 7 home runs in the three post-season series' Tampa Bay played in.

During the 2008 American League Division Series against the Chicago White Sox, Upton hit three home runs and drove in four runs. Against the Boston Red Sox in the 2008 ALCS he hit four home runs and drove in 11. In Game 5 of the World Series, Upton stole second base and scored a crucial game-tying run moments before the game was suspended due to torrential rain. It resumed two nights later and the Rays lost the World Series to the Philadelphia Phillies, 4 games to 1.

Upton became the first Tampa Bay Ray to hit for the cycle, doing so on October 2, 2009. In 2009, he batted .241, his 42 stolen bases were third in the league (as he was caught a third-most 14 times), and his 152 strikeouts were fifth in the AL.

During the Rays' June 27, 2010, home game against the Arizona Diamondbacks, Upton took a long time to retrieve a ball hit by Rusty Ryal into left-center field, allowing a double to become a triple. At the end of that half inning, Evan Longoria approached Upton in the dugout and argued with Upton about his lack of effort. Upton and Longoria argued at very close range until Longoria walked away, while Rays player Willy Aybar grabbed Upton by the waist and took him away from the scene. Maddon found fault with how hard Upton ran after the ball after Ryal pulled it into left center field.

In 2010, he batted .237, his 164 strikeouts were second in the American League, and his 42 steals were fifth. On September 11, 2011, Upton hit his first grand slam in a game against the Boston Red Sox.

On August 3, 2012, Upton hit his 100th career home run. His brother, Justin, would also hit his 100th career home run the same day. On September 9, 2012, Upton had his first three home run game in a game against the Texas Rangers. In the final game of the 2012 season, Upton hit a base hit into left and was taken out of the game for his final appearance for the Rays.

=== Atlanta Braves (2013–2015) ===
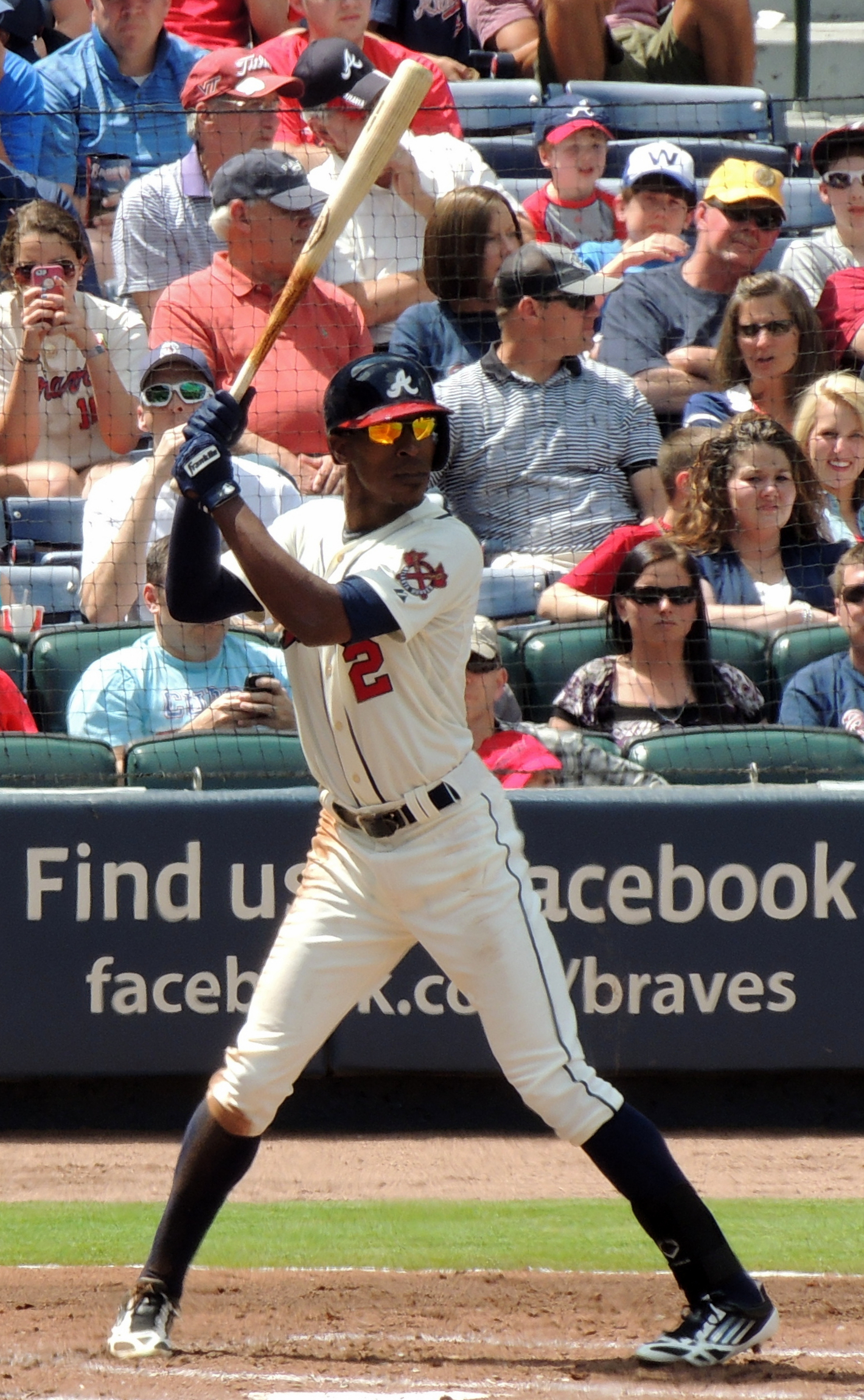
Upton with the Atlanta Braves in 2013

During the 2012–2013 offseason, Upton entered free agency where he signed a five-year, $75.25 million contract with the Atlanta Braves. This contract was the largest free agent contract ever by the Braves, surpassing the 15 million dollar-a-year deal they inked with starting pitcher Derek Lowe in the offseason before the 2009 season. He and his brother, who had been acquired via a trade, hit back to back home runs on April 23, 2013, against the Colorado Rockies, which was the first time brothers hit back to back home runs since 1938.

Upton's offensive output suffered in 2013. He batted just .184/.268/.289 with 26 RBIs in 126 games, and had the second-highest strikeout rate among hitters with at least 400 plate appearances. Baseball Reference put his offensive value at −1.3 wins above replacement.

On April 26, 2014, Upton recorded his 1,000th career hit in a game against the Cincinnati Reds on an infield single that deflected off the glove of Reds pitcher Mike Leake, who attempted to make a play on the ball. On August 8, the Uptons both hit home runs in the same game for the fifth time, setting a new Major League record for brothers. The Uptons previously shared the record for homering in the same game on four occasions with Vladimir and Wilton Guerrero and Jason and Jeremy Giambi.

Upton missed spring training in 2015 due to left foot inflammation.

On April 4, 2015, Upton was placed on the disabled list due to his ongoing foot problems.

=== San Diego Padres (2015–2016) ===
On April 5, 2015, Upton was traded to the San Diego Padres along with Craig Kimbrel in exchange for Carlos Quentin, Cameron Maybin, outfield prospect Jordan Paroubeck, pitching prospect Matt Wisler, and the 41st overall pick in the 2015 MLB draft, which 2 months later turned out to be Austin Riley. This once again reunited him with his brother Justin, who had also been traded to the Padres in December 2014.

Upton was activated on June 7 after missing the start of the season with an injured foot. Upton soon began making starts in center field, which had been primarily manned by Wil Myers and Will Venable earlier in the season. Upton finished 2015 with a .259 batting average and five home runs in 87 games, including 47 starts in center field. In 2016, Upton hit .256 with 16 home runs, 45 RBI, and 20 stolen bases in 92 games before being traded.

=== Toronto Blue Jays (2016) ===
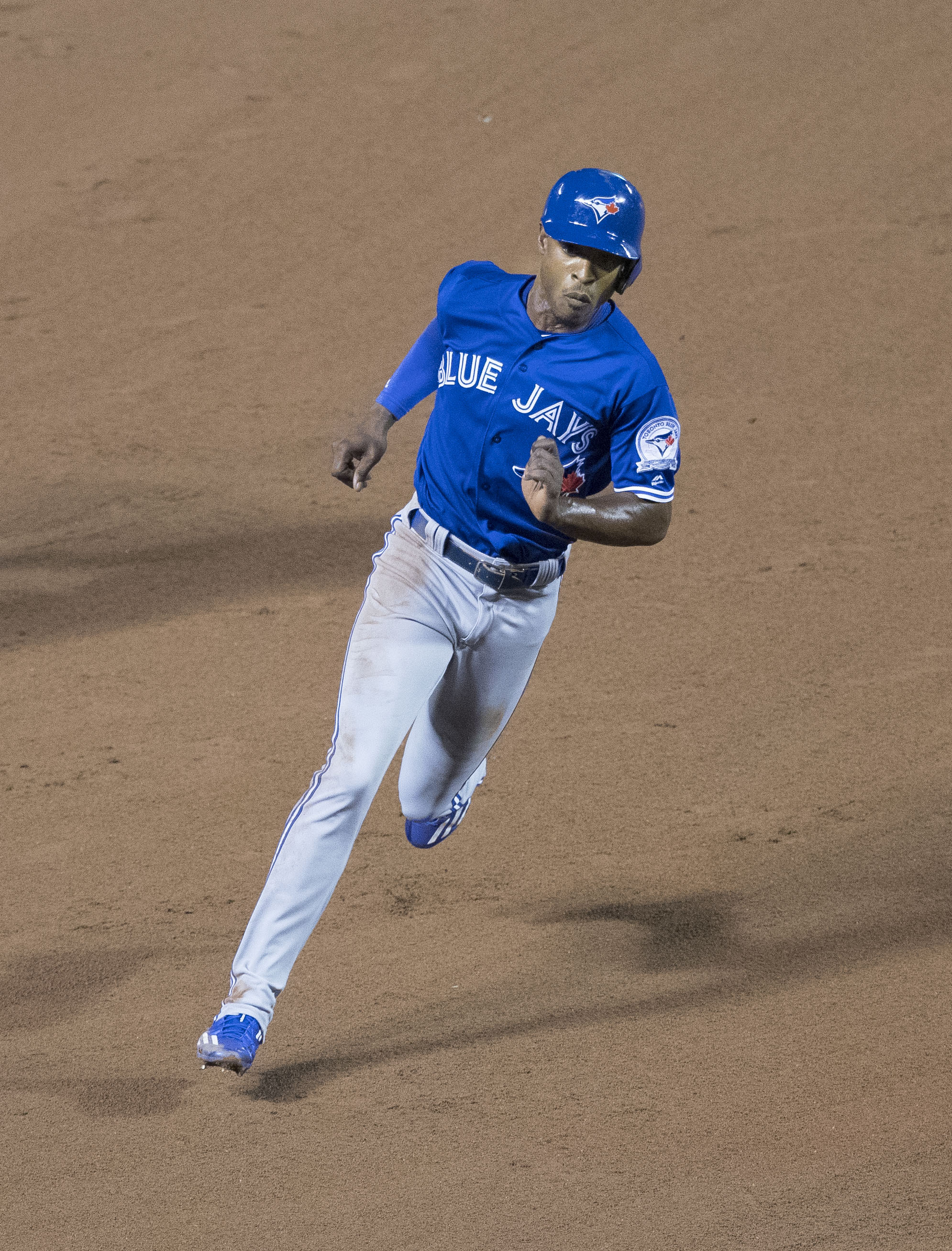
Upton running the bases on August 29, 2016

On July 26, 2016, Upton was traded to the Toronto Blue Jays, along with cash considerations, for minor league pitcher Hansel Rodriguez. His first at-bat as a member of the Blue Jays came on July 26, against the San Diego Padres. Upton would go on to appear in 57 games for Toronto, and hit .196/.261/.318 with four home runs and 16 RBIs. He also recorded seven stolen bases, including the 300th of his career. He was released by the Blue Jays on April 2, 2017, shortly before the team finalized their Opening Day roster. Upton never returned to the major leagues, spending the next few years in the minors.

=== San Francisco Giants (2017) ===
On April 8, 2017, Upton signed a minor-league contract with the San Francisco Giants and was assigned to the Giants' Triple-A affiliate, the Sacramento River Cats. Upton struggled with injuries during the year and twice was placed on the disabled list. He batted .244/.306/.333 in 45 at bats.

On August 21, he was released by the Giants.

=== Cleveland Indians ===
On December 20, 2017, Upton signed a minor league contract with the Cleveland Indians. The deal included an invitation to the Indians' 2018 spring training camp. He was released on March 19, 2018.

In January 2019, Upton retired after not receiving interest from any teams.

== Personal life ==
Early in his career, Upton went by the initials "B. J.", which stood for "Bossman Junior"; Upton's father, Melvin, was nicknamed "Bossman". In 2015, Upton spoke with his family members about using his birth name of "Melvin Upton Jr." full-time, before filing the paperwork with the Major League Baseball office. Upton stated his desire to use his actual name was a result of teammates and fans knowing him as B. J. and feeling the name was irrelevant to him away from the ballpark. In January 2019, Upton announced that he would return to being known as "B. J." at the suggestion of his wife.

== See also ==
- List of Major League Baseball career stolen bases leaders
- List of Major League Baseball players to hit for the cycle

Achievements
Preceded by Félix Pie	Hitting for the cycle October 2, 2009	Succeeded by Jody Gerut
