= Nathan Haynes =

American baseball player (born 1979)

- Outfielder
- Born: September 7, 1979 (age 46); Oakland, California, U.S.
- Batted: Left Threw: Left

MLB debut
- May 28, 2007, for the Los Angeles Angels of Anaheim

Last MLB appearance
- May 9, 2008, for the Tampa Bay Rays

MLB statistics
- Batting average: .256
- Home runs: 0
- Runs batted in: 4
- Stats at Baseball Reference

Teams
- Los Angeles Angels of Anaheim (2007); Tampa Bay Rays (2008)

Nathan Raymond Quinn Haynes (born September 7, 1979) is an American former professional baseball outfielder. He played in Major League Baseball (MLB) for the Los Angeles Angels and Tampa Bay Rays.

== Biography ==
Haynes is the son of John Haynes and Karen Haynes. He has one sister and two nieces.

He was drafted by the Oakland Athletics in the 1st Round (32nd overall) of the 1997 amateur draft. On July 29, 1999, he was traded with Jeff DaVanon and Elvin Nina to the Angels for Omar Olivares and Randy Velarde. After the 2003 season, Haynes became a minor league free agent and signed with the San Francisco Giants. Haynes played in only 8 games for the Giants minor league system over the next two years before becoming a free agent and re-signing with the Angels. He became the second former Gary SouthShore RailCats player to later land on a Major Leagues roster when he played with the Los Angeles Angels in 2007. He played in 40 games for the Angels, hitting .267 with one RBI and one stolen base. His mother is Karen Haynes; his father, John Haynes; and his sister Kayla and two nieces.

On March 28, 2008, Haynes was claimed off waivers by the Tampa Bay Rays. He made 20 appearances for Tampa Bay, going 10-for-44 (.227) with three RBI and four stolen bases. On May 10, Haynes was designated for assignment by Tampa Bay after Cliff Floyd returned from the disabled list. He made 77 total appearances for the Triple-A Durham Bulls during the remainder of the year, batting .253/.287/.318 with two home runs, 24 RBI, and 13 stolen bases.

On January 10, 2009, Haynes signed a minor league contract with the Texas Rangers. He did not appear for the organization before being released on November 24, 2010.
