= Dan Wheeler =

American baseball player (born 1977)

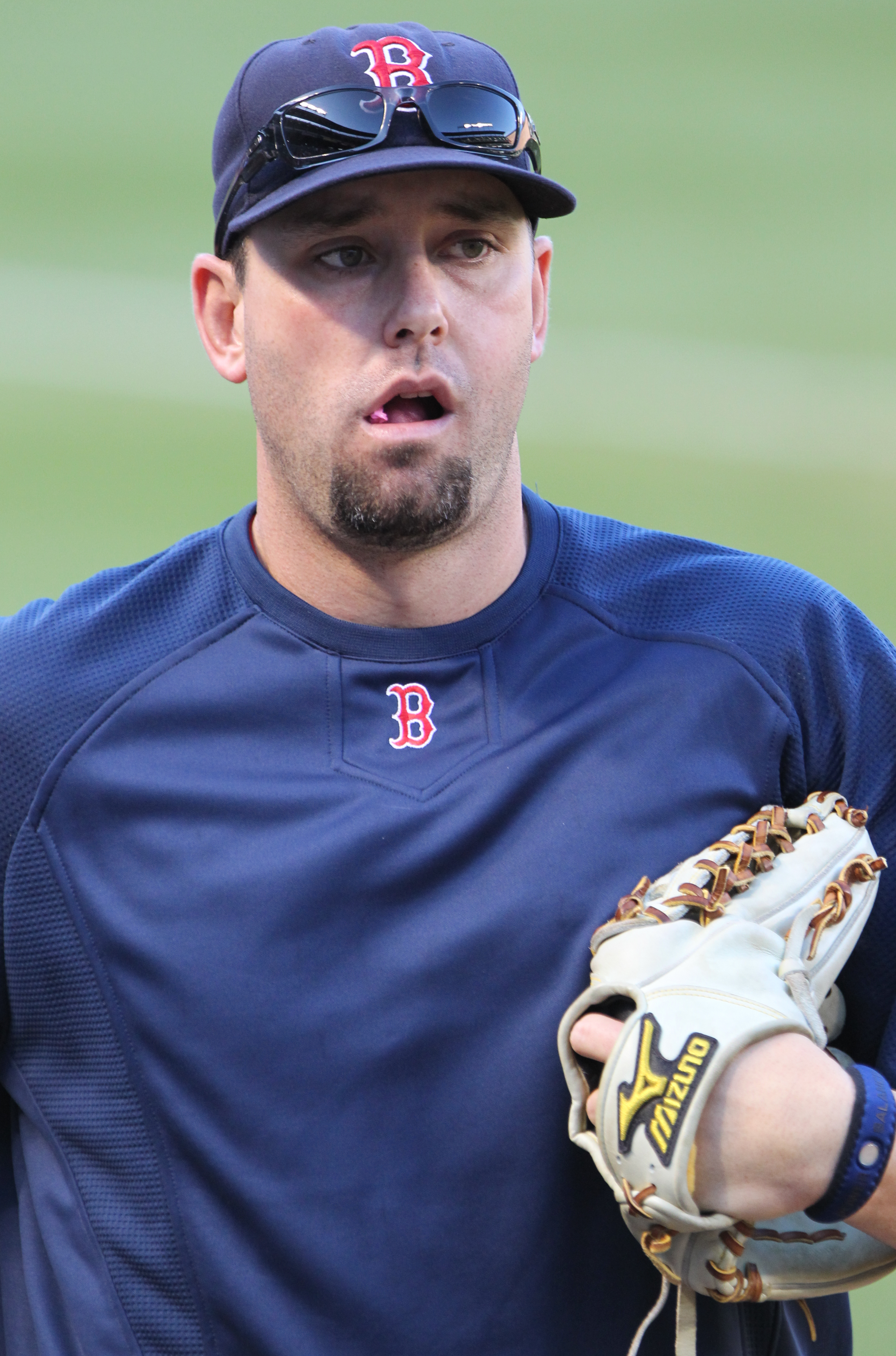
- Wheeler with the Boston Red Sox in 2011
- Pitcher
- Born: December 10, 1977 (age 48); Providence, Rhode Island, U.S.
- Batted: Right Threw: Right

MLB debut
- September 1, 1999, for the Tampa Bay Devil Rays

Last MLB appearance
- May 13, 2012, for the Cleveland Indians

MLB statistics
- Win–loss record: 25–43
- Earned run average: 3.98
- Strikeouts: 555
- Stats at Baseball Reference

Teams
- Tampa Bay Devil Rays (1999–2001); New York Mets (2003–2004); Houston Astros (2004–2007); Tampa Bay Devil Rays / Rays (2007–2010); Boston Red Sox (2011); Cleveland Indians (2012)
Medals
Men's baseball
Representing United States
Pan American Games
Silver medal – second place	1999 Winnipeg	Team

Daniel Michael Wheeler (born December 10, 1977) is an American former professional baseball pitcher. He played in Major League Baseball (MLB) for the Tampa Bay Devil Rays, New York Mets, Houston Astros, Boston Red Sox, and Cleveland Indians from 1999 through 2012.

== Career ==
=== Early career ===
Wheeler attended Pilgrim High School in Warwick, Rhode Island. He was drafted in the 1996 MLB draft by the Tampa Bay Devil Rays out of Central Arizona College. He pitched for the Devil Rays for three years, 1999-2001, and then for the New York Mets in 2003 and part of 2004. The Mets traded him to the Houston Astros during the 2004 season for minor leaguer Adam Seuss.

=== Houston Astros ===
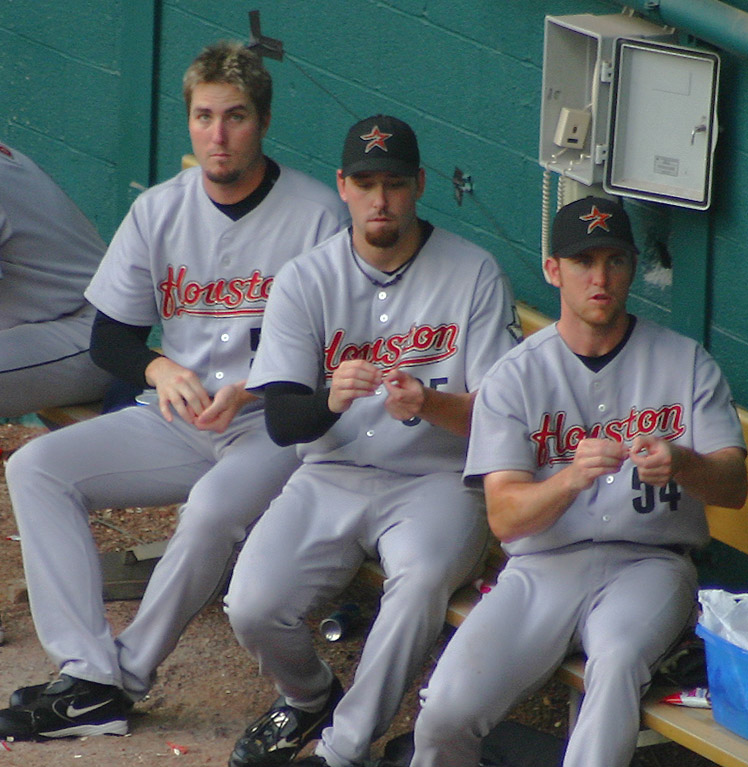
Wheeler (center) with Chad Qualls and Brad Lidge

Wheeler was utterly brilliant during the Astros' 2004 postseason run, throwing 8 innings while striking out 9 and allowing 4 hits, no walks and no runs, posting a perfect 0.00 ERA, over the course of 5 appearances.

In 2005, Wheeler established himself as a top setup man for the Astros, going 2-3 with a 2.21 ERA in 71 games.

On October 19, 2005 during the National League Championship Series, he recorded the last out at Busch Memorial Stadium in St. Louis, Missouri, a fly ball which was caught by Astro Jason Lane in right field off the bat of Yadier Molina. He played on Team USA in the 2006 World Baseball Classic in the offseason.

On April 9, 2007, Wheeler became the Astros' closer, replacing Brad Lidge. However, Wheeler lost the closer's job when Lidge overcame injury and returned to the team.

=== Tampa Bay Devil Rays / Rays ===
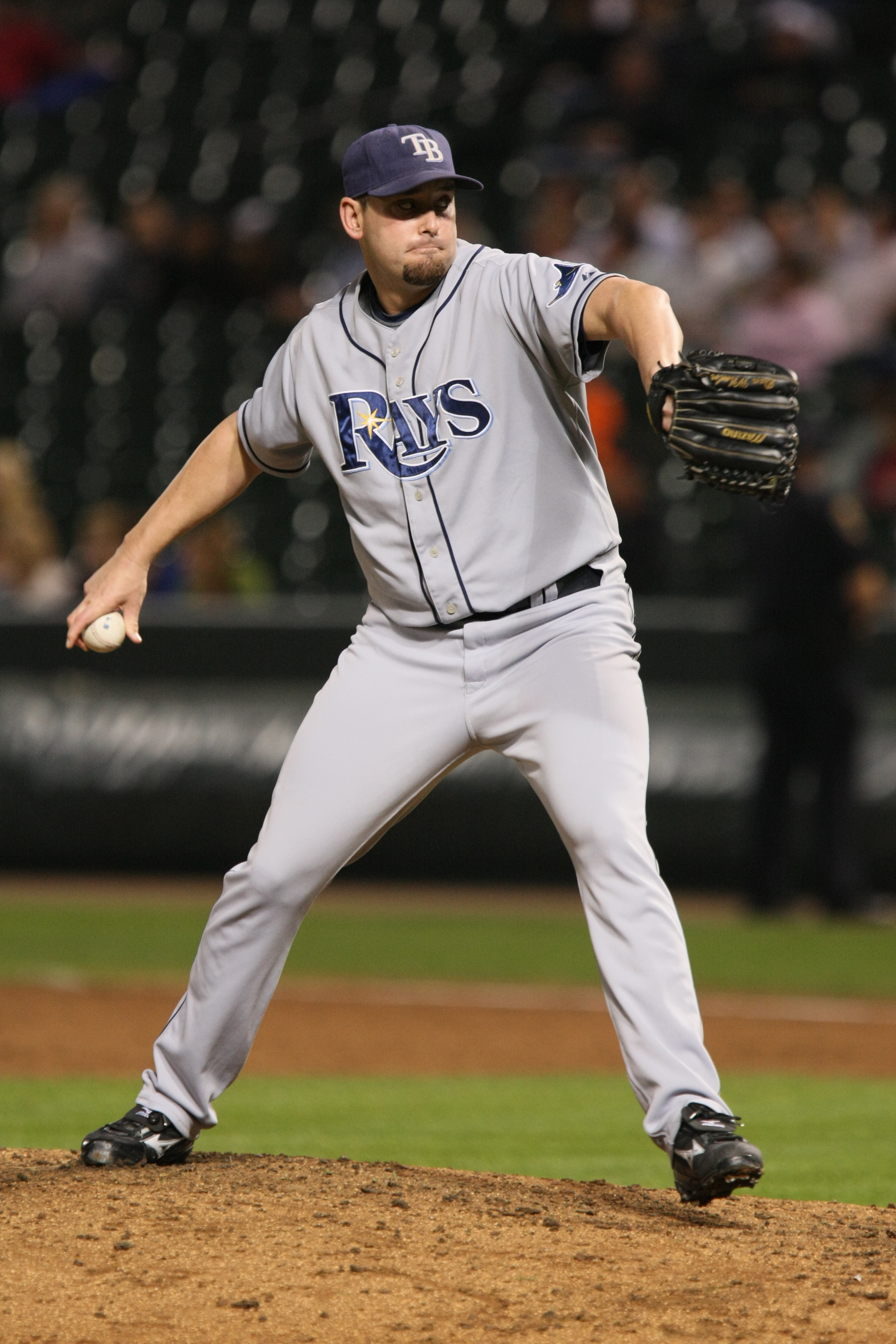
Wheeler in 2008

On July 28, 2007, Wheeler was traded back to the Tampa Bay Devil Rays in exchange for third baseman Ty Wigginton. The organization changed their name from "Devil Rays" to "Rays" after the 2007 season.

=== Boston Red Sox ===
On December 17, 2010, the Boston Red Sox signed Wheeler to a one-year, $3 million contract with a club option for 2012.

=== Cleveland Indians ===
On January 26, 2012, Wheeler signed a minor league contract with the Cleveland Indians. He was added to the team's Opening Day roster on April 4. He struggled early, however, with an 8.76 ERA and two strikeouts in 12 games. Wheeler was designated for assignment immediately following the game on May 13, against the Boston Red Sox in which he gave up six earned runs in one inning. After clearing waivers, Wheeler was outrighted to the triple-A Columbus Clippers on May 16. He appeared in 36 games for Columbus, posting a 3-3 record and a 2.32 ERA. On October 4, Wheeler elected free agency.

=== Kansas City Royals ===
On December 11, 2012, the Kansas City Royals confirmed they had signed Wheeler to a minor league contract with an expected invite to Major League spring training, but he would never appear in another major league game. He was released on May 11, 2013.

Wheeler retired from professional baseball on February 7, 2014.

== Personal life ==
Wheeler is married to Stephanie, who is the daughter of long time Rays play-by-play broadcaster Dewayne Staats.
