= Willy Aybar =

Dominican baseball player (born 1983)

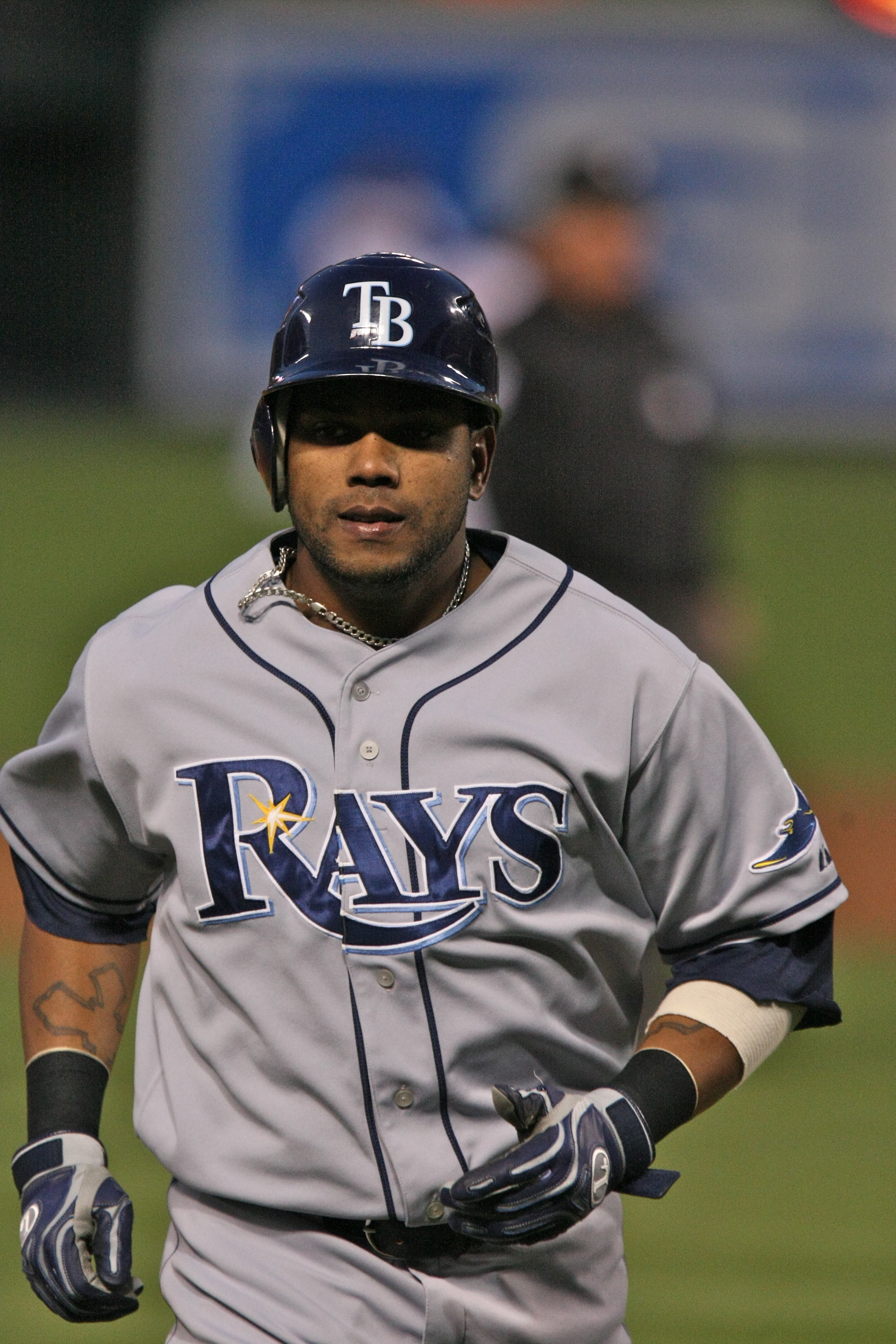
- Aybar with the Tampa Bay Rays
- Infielder
- Born: March 9, 1983 (age 43); Bani, Dominican Republic
- Batted: Switch Threw: Right

MLB debut
- August 31, 2005, for the Los Angeles Dodgers

Last MLB appearance
- October 3, 2010, for the Tampa Bay Rays

MLB statistics
- Batting average: .258
- Home runs: 33
- Runs batted in: 157
- Stats at Baseball Reference

Teams
- Los Angeles Dodgers (2005–2006); Atlanta Braves (2006); Tampa Bay Rays (2008–2010)
Medals
Men's baseball
Representing Dominican Republic
Central American and Caribbean Games
Bronze medal – third place	2014 Veracruz	Team

Willy Del Jesus Aybar Marquez (born March 9, 1983) is a Dominican former professional baseball infielder. He previously played for the Los Angeles Dodgers, Atlanta Braves and Tampa Bay Rays of Major League Baseball (MLB). He is the older brother of Erick Aybar.

== Professional career ==
=== Los Angeles Dodgers ===
On August 31, 2005, Aybar made his MLB debut with the Los Angeles Dodgers. In his short time on the big league roster, Aybar made strides in impressing then-manager Jim Tracy. In 86 at-bats, Aybar compiled a .326 batting average with 10 runs batted in and 3 stolen bases.

After the 2005 season, Aybar was a candidate to start at third base for the Dodgers in 2006. However, in the offseason, the Dodgers signed free agent and former batting champion Bill Mueller as their starting third baseman. After they also signed Ramón Martínez to join Óscar Robles in being the primary backups, Aybar found himself out of a job. His .216 batting average during spring training did not help his cause either.

On May 12, 2006, Aybar received another opportunity to be the starting third baseman when Mueller was placed on the 15-day disabled list for arthroscopic knee surgery, he was recalled from the Dodgers Triple-A affiliate, the Las Vegas 51s.

=== Atlanta Braves ===
On July 28, 2006, the Dodgers traded Aybar and relief pitcher Danys Báez to the Atlanta Braves for infielder Wilson Betemit.

On April 18, 2007, Aybar was suspended indefinitely for unknown reasons. He was first suspended on April 15 for three games for failing to show up for treatments for an injured hand. This was a rare move by the Braves organization, and Aybar's lack of participation caused third baseman Chipper Jones to remark "I didn't even know he was still on the team." The next day, Aybar's agent said that Aybar was struggling substance abuse. Aybar then failed to report to New York for a meeting with MLB officials on April 20. It was later revealed that Aybar was seeking help at a drug treatment facility. The Braves removed Aybar from the suspended list on August 4 and sent him on a rehab assignment in early August. However, on August 14, he underwent season-ending surgery for a stress fracture in his right hand.

=== Tampa Bay Rays ===
On January 17, 2008, Aybar was traded with Chase Fontaine to the Tampa Bay Rays for Jeff Ridgway. On March 24, the Rays announced that he would be the team's starting third baseman. He held this position until Evan Longoria was called up early in the season. Aybar then took the role of utility player. He finished the season batting .253 with 10 home runs and 35 RBI in 95 games. In the field, Aybar started 40 games at third base, 18 at first base, 14 at designated hitter, six at second base, and two at shortstop.

Aybar hit a home run in the seventh and deciding game of the ALCS, a 3–1 Rays victory that sent the franchise to the World Series for the first time.

On February 18, 2009, Aybar signed a two-year, $2.6 million contract with the Rays to avoid arbitration. On December 3, 2010, Aybar was non-tendered by the Rays, making him a free agent.

=== Yuma Scorpions ===
Aybar was selected to play for the Edmonton Capitals in the North American League on February 11, 2011. However, he was released by the Capitals due to the Canadian government not granting him a visa. He later joined the Yuma Scorpions in the same Independent league, which was managed by Jose Canseco. In 13 games he hit .302/.388/.372 with 0 home runs and 3 RBIs.

=== Delfines de Ciudad del Carmen ===
On March 15, 2012, Aybar signed with the Delfines de Ciudad del Carmen of the Mexican League. He was released on April 22. In 7 games he struggled mightily going 4-24 (.167) with 0 home runs and 1 RBI.

=== Leones de Yucatán ===
On March 27, 2015, after 3 years of inactivity, Aybar signed with the Leones de Yucatán of the Mexican League. He was released on June 9. In 35 games he hit .282/.353/.427 with 3 home runs and 17 RBIs.

=== Vaqueros Laguna ===
On June 12, 2015, Aybar signed with the Vaqueros Laguna of the Mexican League. He was released on July 11. In 21 games he hit .314/.402/.514 with 4 home runs and 12 RBIs.

== International career ==
In the 2009 World Baseball Classic, the Dominican Republic team faced the Netherlands in the first round. After the game went into extra innings, the Dutch team scored on an error made by Aybar, eliminating the heavily-favored Dominican team.

Aybar later won a bronze medal with the Dominican Republic at the 2014 Central American and Caribbean Games.

== Personal life ==
Aybar’s brother, Erick Aybar, played in Major League Baseball and the Mexican League. His nephew, Wander Franco, played for the Tampa Bay Rays.

=== Legal issues ===
Aybar has been arrested on multiple occasions for assaulting his wife. On January 31, 2008, he was arrested on domestic violence charges for assaulting his wife in the Dominican Republic. In 2010, Aybar was convicted and sentenced to three months in prison for assaulting his wife and violating a restraining order. She had suffered serious injuries and spent some time in an ICU while in critical condition. In June 2011, Aybar was arrested again for allegedly assaulting his wife. According to the police report, Aybar, who has also battled alcohol problems, was found "extremely intoxicated" at the front entrance of the SeaTac Hilton Hotel. Police documents stated they went to Aybar's room, where his wife was crying and holding a bloody towel to her face and had a cut lip and an abrasion on her forehead and cheek.
