= 2005 Texas Rangers season =

2005 Texas Rangers
- League: American League
- Division: West
- Ballpark: Ameriquest Field in Arlington
- City: Arlington, Texas
- Record: 79–83 (.488)
- Divisional place: 3rd
- Owners: Tom Hicks
- General managers: John Hart
- Managers: Buck Showalter
- Television: KDFI; KDFW; FSN Southwest (Tom Grieve, Josh Lewin)
- Radio: KRLD (Eric Nadel); KFLC (Eleno Ornelas, José Guzmán)

The 2005 Texas Rangers season was the 45th of the Texas Rangers franchise overall, their 34th in Arlington as the Rangers, and their 12th season at Ameriquest Field in Arlington. The Rangers finished third in the American League West. The Rangers had four players in the 2005 All-Star Game. Michael Young, Kenny Rogers, Alfonso Soriano, and Mark Teixeira. Young was also the A.L. batting champion in 2005.

On offense, the team led Major League Baseball in home runs (260), at bats (5,716), slugging percentage (.468) and total bases (2,677). All starters wound up in double figures in home runs. The Rangers used 30 pitchers during the season, the most by any team.

== Offseason ==
- November 16, 2004: Jason Standridge was signed as a free agent with the Texas Rangers.
- March 30, 2005: Cody Ransom was purchased by the Texas Rangers from the Chicago Cubs.

== Regular season ==
=== Opening Day starters ===
- Rod Barajas, C
- Mark Teixeira, 1B
- Alfonso Soriano, 2B
- Hank Blalock, 3B
- Michael Young, SS
- Kevin Mench, LF
- Gary Matthews Jr., CF
- Richard Hidalgo, RF
- David Dellucci, DH
- Ryan Drese, RHP

=== Season standings ===
AL West
Team	W	L	Pct.	GB	Home	Road
Los Angeles Angels of Anaheim	95	67	.586	—	49‍–‍32	46‍–‍35
Oakland Athletics	88	74	.543	7	45‍–‍36	43‍–‍38
Texas Rangers	79	83	.488	16	44‍–‍37	35‍–‍46
Seattle Mariners	69	93	.426	26	39‍–‍42	30‍–‍51

=== Record vs. opponents ===
2005 American League record Source: MLB Standings Grid – 2005
Team	BAL	BOS	CWS	CLE	DET	KC	LAA	MIN	NYY	OAK	SEA	TB	TEX	TOR	NL
Baltimore	—	8–10	2–6	1–6	3–5	4–2	2–4	3–3	7–11	4–6	7–3	12–6	4–6	9–10	8–10
Boston	10–8	—	4–3	4–2	6–4	4–2	6–4	4–2	9–10	6–4	3–3	13–6	7–2	7–11	12–6
Chicago	6–2	3–4	—	14–5	14–5	13–5	4–6	11–7	3–3	2–7	6–3	4–2	3–6	4–2	12–6
Cleveland	6–1	2–4	5–14	—	12–6	13–6	3–5	10–9	3–4	6–3	7–3	4–6	3–3	4–2	15–3
Detroit	5–3	4–6	5–14	6–12	—	10–9	4–6	8–11	1–5	1–5	5–4	5–2	4–2	4–3	9–9
Kansas City	2–4	2–4	5–13	6–13	9–10	—	2–7	6–13	3–3	2–4	2–7	3–5	2–8	3–6	9–9
Los Angeles	4–2	4–6	6–4	5–3	6–4	7–2	—	6–4	6–4	10–9	9–9	4–5	15–4	1–5	12–6
Minnesota	3–3	2–4	7–11	9–10	11–8	13–6	4–6	—	3–3	4–6	6–4	6–0	3–6	4–2	8–10
New York	11–7	10–9	3–3	4–3	5–1	3–3	4–6	3–3	—	7–2	7–3	8–11	7–3	12–6	11–7
Oakland	6–4	4–6	7–2	3–6	5–1	4–2	9–10	6–4	2–7	—	12–6	4–5	11–8	5–5	10–8
Seattle	3–7	3–3	3–6	3–7	4–5	7–2	9–9	4–6	3–7	6–12	—	4–2	6–13	4–6	10–8
Tampa Bay	6–12	6–13	2–4	6–4	2–5	5–3	5–4	0–6	11–8	5–4	2–4	—	6–2	8–11	3–15
Texas	6–4	2–7	6–3	3–3	2–4	8–2	4–15	6–3	3–7	8–11	13–6	2–6	—	7–3	9–9
Toronto	10–9	11–7	2–4	2–4	3–4	6–3	5–1	2–4	6–12	5–5	6–4	11–8	3–7	—	8–10

=== Transactions ===
- May 25, 2005: Cody Ransom was released by the Texas Rangers.
- June 30, 2005: Jason Standridge was released by the Texas Rangers.

=== Roster ===
2005 Texas Rangers
Roster
Pitchers: 40,98 Carlos Almanzar; 39 Pedro Astacio; 39 James Baldwin; 53 Joaquín Benoit; 46 Doug Brocail; 35 Ryan Bukvich; 31 Francisco Cordero; 45 R. A. Dickey; 41 Juan Dominguez; 38 Ryan Drese; 39 Scott Feldman; 48 Kevin Gryboski; 21 Steve Karsay; 57 Travis Hughes; 43 Kameron Loe; 32 Ron Mahay; 61 Chan Ho Park; 54 Erasmo Ramirez; 57 Nick Regilio; 48 Matt Riley; 30 Ricardo Rodríguez; 37 Kenny Rogers; 59 Josh Rupe; 58 Brian Shouse; 44 Jason Standridge; 56 Michael Tejera; 38 Justin Thompson; 40 Edinson Vólquez; 47 John Wasdin; 36 C. J. Wilson; 49 Chris Young	Catchers: 15 Sandy Alomar Jr.; 27 Rod Barajas; 6 Gerald Laird; Infielders: 9 Hank Blalock; 4 Esteban Germán; 24 Adrián González; 20 Marshall McDougall; 25 Phil Nevin; 12 Alfonso Soriano; 23 Mark Teixeira; 10 Michael Young	Outfielders: 13 Chad Allen; 44 Jason Botts; 22 David Dellucci; 7 Mark DeRosa; 51 Richard Hidalgo; 14 Gary Matthews Jr.; 28 Kevin Mench; 17 Laynce Nix; 2 Andrés Torres	Manager: 11 Buck Showalter; Coaches: 52 Mark Connor (bullpen); 16 DeMarlo Hale (first base); 55 Orel Hershiser (pitching); 8 Rudy Jaramillo (hitting); 1 Steve Smith (third base); 18 Don Wakamatsu (bench)

=== Lone Star series ===
The annual interleague games between the Houston Astros and the Texas Rangers were played in June and July. They are known as the Lone Star Series.

Date	Winning team	Score	Winning pitcher	Losing pitcher	Attendance	Location
May 20	Texas	7–3	Kenny Rogers	Brandon Backe	38,109	Arlington
May 21	Texas	18–3	Chris Young	Ezequiel Astacio	35,781	Arlington
May 22	Texas	2–0	Chan Ho Park	Roy Oswalt	40,583	Arlington
June 24	Houston	5–2	Roy Oswalt	Ricardo Rodríguez	36,199	Houston
June 25	Texas	6–5	Chris Young	Brandon Backe	41,868	Houston
June 26	Houston	3–2	Chad Qualls	Juan Domínguez	35,331	Houston

=== Game log ===
2005 game log
April

#	Date	Opponent	Score	Win	Loss	Save	Attendance	Record
1	April 5	@ Angels	3–2	Colón	Drese (0–1)	Rodríguez	43,590	0–1
2	April 6	@ Angels	3–2	Shouse (1–0)	Prinz		35,077	1–1
3	April 7	@ Angels	7–6	Shields	Shouse (1–1)		35,169	1–2
4	April 8	@ Mariners	9–6	Putz	Regilio (0–1)	Guardado	29,652	2–2
5	April 9	@ Mariners	7–6	Brocail (1–0)	Guardado	Cordero (1)	31,501	2–3
6	April 10	@ Mariners	7–6	Riley (1–0)	Thornton	Cordero (2)	30,434	3–3
7	April 11	Angels	7–6	Shields	Dickey (0–1)	Rodríguez	50,054	3–4
8	April 12	Angels	13–8	Lackey	Young (0–1)	Shields	23,061	3–5
9	April 13	Angels	7–5	Park (1–0)	Byrd	Cordero (3)	21,625	4–5
10	April 14	Blue Jays	2–1	Halladay	Astacio (0–1)		19,366	4–6
11	April 15	Blue Jays	4–2	Drese (1–1)	Lilly	Cordero (4)	30,453	5–6
12	April 16	Blue Jays	8–0	Chacín	Rogers (0–1)		40,499	5–7
13	April 17	Blue Jays	6–5	Young (1–1)	Towers	Cordero (5)	31,310	6–7
14	April 18	Athletics	8–5	Haren	Park (1–1)	Dotel	20,939	6–8
15	April 19	Athletics	3–0	Astacio (1–1)	Blanton	Cordero (6)	22,146	7–8
16	April 20	@ Devil Rays	12–10	Drese (2–1)	Webb	Cordero (7)	8,816	8–8
17	April 21	@ Devil Rays	3–2	Brazelton	Rogers (0–2)	Báez	8,799	8–9
18	April 22	@ Yankees	5–3	Young (2–1)	Brown	Cordero (8)	42,710	9–9
19	April 23	@ Yankees	10–2	Park (2–1)	Wright		44,731	10–9
20	April 24	@ Yankees	11–1	Johnson	Astacio (1–2)		42,732	10–10
21	April 26	Mariners	7–4	Piñeiro	Drese (2–2)	Guardado	23,064	10–11
22	April 27	Mariners	8–2	Rogers (1–2)	Franklin		26,308	11–11
23	April 28	Mariners	4–1	Meche	Young (2–2)	Guardado	23,928	11–12
24	April 29	Red Sox	7–2	Park (3–1)	Wakefield	Mahay (1)	43,933	12–12
25	April 30	Red Sox	9–2	Arroyo	Astacio (1–3)		44,114	12–13

May

#	Date	Opponent	Score	Win	Loss	Save	Attendance	Record
26	May 1	Red Sox	6–5	Clement	Drese (2–3)	Foulke	49,342	12–14
27	May 2	@Athletics	3–2	Shouse (2–1)	Harden	Cordero (9)	10,144	13–14
28	May 3	@Athletics	6–1	Young (3–2)	Saarloos		10,427	14–14
29	May 4	@Athletics	16–7	Rogers (2–2)	Haren		15,654	15–14
30	May 6	Indians	8–6	Lee	Astacio (1–4)	Wickman	30,742	15–15
31	May 7	Indians	6–1	Drese (3–3)	Elarton		36,311	16–15
32	May 8	Indians	7–2	Rogers (3–2)	Westbrook	Cordero (10)	23,203	17–15
33	May 9	Tigers	2–0	Robertson	Cordero (0–1)		24,122	17–16
34	May 10	Tigers	5–4	Brocail (2–0)	Johnson	Cordero (11)	24,766	18–16
35	May 11	Tigers	6–5	Walker	Mahay (0–1)	Urbina	28,689	18–17
36	May 13	@Twins	9–6	Brocail (3–0)	Nathan	Cordero (12)	24,524	19–17
37	May 14	@Twins	5–0	Rogers (4–2)	Silva		28,624	20–17
38	May 15	@Twins	5–2	Radke	Mahay (0–2)	Nathan	27,891	20–18
39	May 16	@White Sox	7–6	Regilio (1–1)	Marte	Cordero (13)	26,889	21–18
40	May 17	@White Sox	5–2	Garland	Astacio (1–5)	Hermanson	18,333	21–19
41	May 18	@White Sox	7–0	Buehrle	Drese (3–4)		16,255	21–20
42	May 20	Astros	7–3	Rogers (5–2)	Backe		38,109	22–20
43	May 21	Astros	18–3	Young (4–2)	Astacio		35,781	23–20
44	May 22	Astros	2–0	Park (4–1)	Oswalt	Cordero (14)	40,583	24–20
45	May 24	Royals	4–3	Drese (4–4)	Hernández	Cordero (15)	27,449	25–20
46	May 25	Royals	7–3	Astacio (2–5)	Greinke		23,755	26–20
47	May 26	Royals	8–1	Rogers (6–2)	Lima		25,022	27–20
48	May 27	White Sox	6–2	Young (5–2)	McCarthy	Cordero (16)	31,149	28–20
--	May 28	Postponed						29–20
49	May 29	White Sox	12–4	Park (5–1)	Garland		36,265	29–20
50	May 31	@Tigers	8–2	Rogers (7–2)	Maroth		16,931	30–20

June

#	Date	Opponent	Score	Win	Loss	Save	Attendance	Record
51	June 1	@Tigers	6–4	Bonderman	Drese (4–5)	Urbina	15,428	30–21
52	June 2	@Tigers	6–5	Urbina	Regilio (1–2)		21,166	30–22
53	June 3	@Royals	2–1	Sisco	Astacio (2–6)	MacDougal	11,635	30–23
54	June 4	@Royals	14–9	Park (6–1)	Lima		18,808	31–23
55	June 5	@Royals	8–1	Rogers (8–2)	Greinke		21,424	32–23
56	June 7	@Phillies	8–5	Lieber	Drese (4–6)	Wagner	33,616	32–24
57	June 8	@Phillies	2–0	Fultz	Young (5–3)	Wagner	24,339	32–25
58	June 9	@Phillies	10–8	Padilla	Astacio (2–7)	Wagner	25,205	32–26
59	June 10	@Marlins	12–5	Jones	Brocail (3–1)		16,622	32–27
60	June 11	@Marlins	6–5	Riedling	Domínguez (0–1)	Jones	25,557	32–28
61	June 12	@Marlins	6–2	Rodríguez (1–0)	Moehler	Wasdin (1)	21,303	33–28
62	June 13	Braves	7–3	Young (6–3)	Hudson		41,594	34–28
63	June 14	Braves	7–2	Sosa	Astacio (2–8)		30,221	34–29
64	June 15	Braves	9–5	Park (7–1)	Davies	Cordero (17)	33,663	35–29
65	June 17	Nationals	8–1	Rogers (9–2)	Patterson		33,653	36–29
66	June 18	Nationals	7–4	Rodríguez (2–0)	Armas		48,663	37–29
67	June 19	Nationals	8–2	Hughes	Wilson (0–1)		34,474	37–30
68	June 20	@Angels	5–1	Byrd	Young (6–4)		41,007	37–31
69	June 21	@Angels	8–6	Colón	Park (7–2)		43,025	37–32
70	June 22	@Angels	6–0	Washburn	Rogers (9–3)		41,763	37–33
71	June 24	@Astros	5–2	Oswalt	Rodríguez (2–1)	Lidge	36,199	37–34
72	June 25	@Astros	6–5	Young (7–4)	Backe	Cordero (18)	41,868	38–34
73	June 26	@Astros	3–2	Qualls	Domínguez (0–2)		35,331	38–35
74	June 27	Angels	13–3	Colón	Wilson (0–2)		34,471	38–36
75	June 28	Angels	5–1	Donnelly	Loe (0–1)		27,159	38–37
76	June 29	Angels	7–6	Loe (1–1)	Shields		30,112	39–37
77	June 30	Angels	18–5	Young (8–4)	Santana		27,466	40–37

July

#	Date	Opponent	Score	Win	Loss	Save	Attendance	Record
78	July 1	@Mariners	6–2	Park (8–2)	Sele		37,270	41–37
79	July 2	@Mariners	6–5	Loe (2–1)	Putz	Cordero (19)	34,209	42–37
80	July 3	@Mariners	2–1	Moyer	Rogers (9–4)	Guardado	34,397	42–38
81	July 4	Red Sox	6–5	Benoit (1–0)	Foulke		50,492	43–38
82	July 5	Red Sox	7–4	Wakefield	Young (8–5)	Timlin	33,356	43–39
83	July 6	Red Sox	7–4	Clement	Park (8–3)	Embree	34,962	43–40
84	July 8	Blue Jays	7–6	Cordero (1–1)	Batista		30,242	44–40
85	July 9	Blue Jays	12–10	Rogers (10–4)	Downs	Cordero (20)	36,285	45–40
86	July 10	Blue Jays	9–8	Loe (3–1)	Frasor		25,767	46–40
87	July 14	@Athletics	6–0	Harden	Park (8–4)		17,987	46–41
88	July 15	@Athletics	7–2	Zito	Wasdin (0–1)		22,423	46–42
89	July 16	@Athletics	10–8	Rogers (11–4)	Blanton	Cordero (21)	22,826	47–42
90	July 17	@Athletics	5–4	Kennedy	Loe (3–2)		25,330	47–43
91	July 18	Yankees	11–10	Sturtze	Brocail (3–2)	Rivera	46,538	47–44
92	July 19	Yankees	2–1	Loe (4–2)	Franklin	Cordero (22)	45,208	48–44
93	July 20	Yankees	8–4	Small	Benoit (1–1)		45,354	48–45
94	July 21	Athletics	6–4	Witasick	Loe (4–3)	Street	31,643	48–46
95	July 22	Athletics	11–10	Haren	Young (8–6)		35,266	48–47
96	July 23	Athletics	5–4	Saarloos	Rodríguez (2–2)	Street	38,841	48–48
97	July 24	Athletics	8–3	Harden	Park (8–5)		29,410	48–49
98	July 25	Orioles	4–2	Benoit (2–1)	Cabrera	Cordero (23)	29,314	49–49
99	July 26	@Orioles	5–4	Grimsley	Baldwin (0–1)	Ryan	25,235	49–50
100	July 27	@Orioles	11–8	Cordero (2–1)	Julio	Baldwin (1)	31,540	50–50
101	July 28	@Orioles	2–1	Loe (5–3)	Ray	Cordero (24)	22,254	51–50
102	July 29	@Blue Jays	4–1	Brocail (4–2)	Downs	Cordero (25)	21,113	52–50
103	July 30	@Blue Jays	3–2	Benoit (3–1)	Frasor	Cordero (26)	23,039	53–50
104	July 31	@Blue Jays	5–1	Chacín	Wilson (0–3)		24,123	53–51

August

#	Date	Opponent	Score	Win	Loss	Save	Attendance	Record
105	August 2	Devil Rays	10–8	McClung	Young (8–7)	Báez	30,038	53–52
106	August 3	Devil Rays	8–5	Harper	Rodríguez (2–3)	Báez	30,513	53–53
107	August 4	Devil Rays	13–5	Gryboski (1–0)	Orvella		27,176	54–53
108	August 5	Orioles	10–5	Chen	Wilson (0–4)		37,296	54–54
109	August 6	Orioles	10–3	Wasdin (1–1)	Cabrera	Loe (1)	34,632	55–54
110	August 7	Orioles	9–3	Young (9–7)	Ponson		27,137	56–54
111	August 8	@Red Sox	11–6	González	Karsay (0–1)		35,453	56–55
112	August 9	@Red Sox	8–7	Schilling	Gryboski (1–1)		35,308	56–56
113	August 10	@Red Sox	16–5	Arroyo	Rogers (11–5)		35,379	56–57
114	August 11	@Yankees	9–8	Sturtze	Baldwin (0–2)	Rivera	54,283	56–58
115	August 12	@Yankees	6–5	Leiter	Wilson (0–5)	Sturtze	54,442	56–59
116	August 13	@Yankees	7–5	Small	Loe (5–4)		54,919	56–60
117	August 14	@Yankees	10–3	Chacón	Benoit (3–2)		54,824	56–61
118	August 16	@Indians	8–2	Sabathia	Rogers (11–6)		27,403	56–62
119	August 17	@Indians	3–0	Young (10–7)	Millwood	Cordero (27)	20,442	57–62
120	August 18	@Indians	9–4	Westbrook	Wilson (0–6)		23,214	57–63
121	August 19	@Devil Rays	2–1	McClung	Domínguez (0–3)	Báez	10,188	57–64
122	August 20	@Devil Rays	4–2	Kazmir	Benoit (3–3)	Baez	19,041	57–65
123	August 21	@Devil Rays	6–3	Fossum	Rogers (11–7)	Báez	13,974	57–66
124	August 23	Mariners	6–4	Young (11–7)	Moyer	Cordero (28)	25,653	58–66
125	August 24	Mariners	8–1	Domínguez (1–3)	Franklin	Wasdin (2)	28,612	59–66
126	August 25	Mariners	8–2	Harris	Benoit (3–4)		19,112	59–67
127	August 26	Twins	6–0	Loe (6–4)	Kyle Lohse	Wilson (1)	28,877	60–67
128	August 27	Twins	7–2	Nathan	Shouse (2–2)		25,351	60–68
129	August 28	Twins	2–1	Brocail (5–2)	Crain		20,882	61–68
130	August 29	White Sox	7–5	Domínguez (2–3)	Buehrle	Brocail (1)	27,819	62–68
131	August 30	White Sox	8–6	Wilson (1–6)	Garland	Cordero (29)	n/a	63–68
132	August 30	White Sox	8–0	McCarthy	Vólquez (0–1)		28,183	63–69
133	August 31	White Sox	9–2	Loe (7–4)	Hernández		23,493	64–69

September/October

#	Date	Opponent	Score	Win	Loss	Save	Attendance	Record
134	September 1	@Royals	5–4	Rogers (12–7)	Howell	Cordero (30)	12,735	65–69
135	September 2	@Royals	8–7	Cordero (3–1)	MacDougal	Wasdin (3)	14,425	66–69
136	September 3	@Royals	5–3	Domínguez (3–3)	Carrasco		18,932	67–69
137	September 4	@Royals	17–8	Núñez	Vólquez (0–2)		15,512	67–70
138	September 5	@Twins	7–0	Loe (8–4)	Silva		15,627	68–70
139	September 6	@Twins	10–7	Wasdin (2–1)	Nathan	Cordero (31)	12,564	69–70
140	September 7	@Twins	8–6	Romero	Brocail (5–3)	Nathan	13,034	69–71
141	September 9	Athletics	9–8	Zito	Domínguez (3–4)	Street	26,468	69–72
142	September 10	Athletics	5–4	Blanton	Loe (8–5)	Street	41,058	69–73
143	September 11	Athletics	7–4	Rogers (13–7)	Kennedy	Wasdin (4)	19,913	70–73
144	September 12	Orioles	4–2	Cabrera	Vólquez (0–3)	Ryan	20,418	70–74
145	September 13	Orioles	4–3	Ray	Wilson (1–7)	Ryan	21,167	70–75
146	September 14	Orioles	7–6	Benoit (4–4)	Grimsley		18,077	71–75
147	September 15	Mariners	4–3	Loe (9–5)	Harris	Cordero (32)	23,679	72–75
148	September 16	Mariners	5–3	Rupe (1–0)	Hernández	Cordero (33)	25,567	73–75
149	September 17	Mariners	7–6	Shouse (3–2)	Guardado		41,983	74–75
150	September 18	Mariners	8–6	Dickey (1–1)	Franklin	Cordero (34)	26,532	75–75
151	September 20	@Angels	2–1	Colón	Domínguez (3–5)	Rodríguez	36,170	75–76
152	September 21	@Angels	6–5	Yan	Feldman (0–1)	Rodríguez	37,776	75–77
153	September 22	@Angels	7–4	Santana	Vólquez (0–4)	Escobar	36,588	75–78
154	September 23	@Athletics	3–1	Rogers (14–7)	Haren	Cordero (35)	33,402	76–78
155	September 24	@Athletics	7–6	Duchscherer	Wasdin (2–2)	Street	26,704	76–79
156	September 25	@Athletics	6–2	Domínguez (4–5)	Saarloos		27,709	77–79
157	September 27	@Mariners	3–2	Wasdin (3–2)	Mateo	Cordero (36)	22,739	78–79
158	September 28	@Mariners	7–3	Young (12–7)	Piñeiro	Cordero (37)	20,723	79–79
159	September 29	@Mariners	4–3	Franklin	Rogers (14–8)	Guardado	19,481	79–80
160	September 30	Angels	7–1	Lackey	Dickey (1–2)		38,187	79–81
161	October 1	Angels	7–6	Shields	Domínguez (4–6)	Rodríguez	48,174	79–82
162	October 2	Angels	7–4	Santana	Loe (9–6)	Rodríguez	38,334	79–83

Source: ESPN.com

== Player stats ==
=== Batting ===
Note: Pos = Position; G = Games played; AB = At bats; H = Hits; Avg. = Batting average; HR = Home runs; RBI = Runs batted in

Pos	Player	G	AB	H	Avg.	HR	RBI
C	Rod Barajas	120	410	104	.254	21	60
1B	Mark Teixeira	162	644	194	.301	43	144
2B	Alfonso Soriano	156	637	171	.268	36	104
SS	Michael Young	159	668	221	.331	24	91
3B	Hank Blalock	161	647	170	.263	25	92
LF	Kevin Mench	150	557	147	.264	25	73
CF	Gary Matthews Jr.	131	475	121	.255	17	55
RF	Richard Hidalgo	88	308	68	.221	16	43
DH	David Dellucci	128	435	109	.251	29	65

==== Other batters ====
Note: G = Games played; AB = At bats; H = Hits; Avg. = Batting average; HR = Home runs; RBI = Runs batted in

Player	G	AB	H	Avg.	HR	RBI
Laynce Nix	63	229	55	.240	6	32
Adrián González	43	150	34	.227	6	17
Mark DeRosa	66	148	36	.243	8	20
Sandy Alomar Jr.	46	128	35	.273	0	14
Phil Nevin	29	99	18	.182	3	8
Chad Allen	21	53	15	.283	0	5
Gerald Laird	13	40	9	.225	1	4
Jason Botts	10	27	8	.296	0	3
Andres Torrés	8	19	3	.158	0	1
Marshall McDougall	18	18	3	.167	0	0
Esteban Germán	5	4	3	.750	0	1

=== Starting pitchers ===
Note: G = Games pitched; IP = Innings pitched; W = Wins; L = Losses; ERA = Earned run average; SO = Strikeouts

Player	G	IP	W	L	ERA	SO
Kenny Rogers	30	195.1	14	8	3.46	87
Chris Young	31	164.2	12	7	4.26	137
Chan Ho Park	20	109.2	8	5	5.66	80
Ryan Drese	12	69.2	4	6	6.46	20
Pedro Astacio	12	67.0	2	8	6.04	45
Ricardo Rodríguez	12	57.0	2	3	5.53	24

==== Other pitchers ====
Note: G = Games pitched; IP = Innings pitched; W = Wins; L = Losses; ERA = Earned run average; SO = Strikeouts

Player	G	IP	W	L	ERA	SO
Kameron Loe	48	92.0	9	6	3.42	45
Joaquín Benoit	32	87.0	4	4	3.72	78
John Wasdin	31	75.2	3	2	4.28	44
Juan Domínguez	22	70.1	4	6	4.22	45
C.J. Wilson	24	48.0	1	7	6.94	30
R.A. Dickey	9	29.2	1	2	6.67	15
Edinson Vólquez	6	12.2	0	4	14.21	11
Josh Rupe	4	9.2	1	0	2.79	6

===== Relief pitchers =====
Note: G = Games pitched; W = Wins; L = Losses; SV = Saves; ERA = Earned run average; SO = Strikeouts

Player	G	W	L	SV	ERA	SO
Francisco Cordero	69	3	1	37	3.39	79
Brian Shouse	64	3	2	0	5.23	35
Doug Brocail	61	5	3	1	5.52	61
Ron Mahay	30	0	2	1	6.81	30
Nick Regilio	18	1	2	0	4.58	14
Erasmo Ramirez	16	0	0	0	3.91	6
Steve Karsay	14	0	1	0	7.47	9
Kevin Gryboski	11	1	1	0	11.17	2
James Baldwin	8	0	2	1	5.19	9
Scott Feldman	8	0	1	0	0.96	4
Matt Riley	7	1	0	0	9.95	4
Carlos Almanzar	6	0	0	0	14.40	3
Ryan Bukvich	4	0	0	0	11.25	4
Michael Tejera	3	0	0	0	13.50	2
Jason Standridge	2	0	0	0	11.57	2
Justin Thompson	2	0	0	0	21.60	1

== Awards and honors ==
- Michael Young, A.L. Batting Title
- Mark Teixeira, 1B, Gold Glove
- Mark Teixeira, 1B, Silver Slugger Award
- Alfonso Soriano, 2B, Silver Slugger Award

All-Star Game

== Farm system ==
Level	Team	League	Manager
AAA	Oklahoma RedHawks	Pacific Coast League	Bobby Jones
AA	Frisco RoughRiders	Texas League	Darryl Kennedy
A	Bakersfield Blaze	California League	Arnie Beyeler
A	Clinton LumberKings	Midwest League	Carlos Subero
A-Short Season	Spokane Indians	Northwest League	Greg Riddoch
Rookie	AZL Rangers	Arizona League	Pedro López

LEAGUE CHAMPIONS: Spokane
