= 2005 Cleveland Indians season =

2005 Cleveland Indians
- League: American League
- Division: Central
- Ballpark: Jacobs Field
- City: Cleveland, Ohio
- Record: 93–69 (.574)
- Divisional place: 2nd
- Owners: Larry Dolan
- General managers: Mark Shapiro
- Managers: Eric Wedge
- Television: Fox Sports Ohio (John Sanders, Rick Manning, Mike Hegan)
- Radio: WTAM; Cleveland Indians Radio Network (Tom Hamilton, Matt Underwood, Mike Hegan)

The 2005 Cleveland Indians season was the 105th season for the franchise. It involved the Indians attempting to win the American League Central. They had a very good September (with 17 wins and 9 losses), and went into a season-closing series with the Chicago White Sox with a chance to tie the White Sox record (though the White Sox held the tiebreaker and had already won the division) and make it into the playoffs, but lost three close games to finish 6 games behind the White Sox, who were the eventual World Series winners, eliminating Cleveland from the possibility to go to the playoffs.

== Offseason ==
- November 3, 2004: Ernie Young was signed as a free agent with the Cleveland Indians.
- November 24, 2004: Bob Wickman was signed as a free agent by the Indians.
- January 17, 2005: Juan González was signed as a free agent by the Indians. His season – and his career – ended on his first regular season at-bat, when he pulled a leg muscle trying to run out a ground ball.

== Regular season ==
=== Season standings ===
AL Central
Team	W	L	Pct.	GB	Home	Road
Chicago White Sox	99	63	.611	—	47‍–‍34	52‍–‍29
Cleveland Indians	93	69	.574	6	43‍–‍38	50‍–‍31
Minnesota Twins	83	79	.512	16	45‍–‍36	38‍–‍43
Detroit Tigers	71	91	.438	28	39‍–‍42	32‍–‍49
Kansas City Royals	56	106	.346	43	34‍–‍47	22‍–‍59

=== Record vs. opponents ===
2005 American League record Source: MLB Standings Grid – 2005
Team	BAL	BOS	CWS	CLE	DET	KC	LAA	MIN	NYY	OAK	SEA	TB	TEX	TOR	NL
Baltimore	—	8–10	2–6	1–6	3–5	4–2	2–4	3–3	7–11	4–6	7–3	12–6	4–6	9–10	8–10
Boston	10–8	—	4–3	4–2	6–4	4–2	6–4	4–2	9–10	6–4	3–3	13–6	7–2	7–11	12–6
Chicago	6–2	3–4	—	14–5	14–5	13–5	4–6	11–7	3–3	2–7	6–3	4–2	3–6	4–2	12–6
Cleveland	6–1	2–4	5–14	—	12–6	13–6	3–5	10–9	3–4	6–3	7–3	4–6	3–3	4–2	15–3
Detroit	5–3	4–6	5–14	6–12	—	10–9	4–6	8–11	1–5	1–5	5–4	5–2	4–2	4–3	9–9
Kansas City	2–4	2–4	5–13	6–13	9–10	—	2–7	6–13	3–3	2–4	2–7	3–5	2–8	3–6	9–9
Los Angeles	4–2	4–6	6–4	5–3	6–4	7–2	—	6–4	6–4	10–9	9–9	4–5	15–4	1–5	12–6
Minnesota	3–3	2–4	7–11	9–10	11–8	13–6	4–6	—	3–3	4–6	6–4	6–0	3–6	4–2	8–10
New York	11–7	10–9	3–3	4–3	5–1	3–3	4–6	3–3	—	7–2	7–3	8–11	7–3	12–6	11–7
Oakland	6–4	4–6	7–2	3–6	5–1	4–2	9–10	6–4	2–7	—	12–6	4–5	11–8	5–5	10–8
Seattle	3–7	3–3	3–6	3–7	4–5	7–2	9–9	4–6	3–7	6–12	—	4–2	6–13	4–6	10–8
Tampa Bay	6–12	6–13	2–4	6–4	2–5	5–3	5–4	0–6	11–8	5–4	2–4	—	6–2	8–11	3–15
Texas	6–4	2–7	6–3	3–3	2–4	8–2	4–15	6–3	3–7	8–11	13–6	2–6	—	7–3	9–9
Toronto	10–9	11–7	2–4	2–4	3–4	6–3	5–1	2–4	6–12	5–5	6–4	11–8	3–7	—	8–10

=== Notable transactions ===
- June 7, 2005: Tim Lincecum was drafted by the Cleveland Indians in the 42nd round of the 2005 Major League Baseball draft, but did not sign.

=== Roster ===
2005 Cleveland Indians
**Roster**
**Pitchers**: 63 Rafael Betancourt; 56 Fernando Cabrera; 50 Jason Davis; 39 Scott Elarton; 36 Jeremy Guthrie; 46 Bob Howry; 31 Cliff Lee; 59 Matt Miller; 34 Kevin Millwood; 53 Arthur Rhodes; 54 David Riske; 52 CC Sabathia; 47 Scott Sauerbeck; 30 Brian Tallet; 32 Kazuhito Tadano; 37 Jake Westbrook; 26 Bob Wickman	**Catchers**: 44 Josh Bard; 41 Víctor Martínez; **Infielders**: 20 Ronnie Belliard; 17 Aaron Boone; 23 Ben Broussard; 12 Alex Cora; 48 Travis Hafner; 11 José Hernández; 8 Jeff Liefer; 2 Jhonny Peralta; 7 Brandon Phillips; 15 Ramón Vázquez	**Outfielders**: 1 Casey Blake; 10 Coco Crisp; 9 Jason Dubois; 9 Jody Gerut; 16 Juan González; 38 Franklin Gutiérrez; 38 Ryan Ludwick; 24 Grady Sizemore; **Other batters**: 25 Ryan Garko	**Manager**: 22 Eric Wedge; **Coaches**: 25 Buddy Bell (Bench); 29 Jeff Datz (First Base); 4 Luis Isaac (Bullpen); 33 Eddie Murray (Hitting, Until June 4); -- Derek Shelton (Hitting, Starting June 5); 35 Joel Skinner (Third Base); -- Robby Thompson (Bench); 43 Dan Williams (Bullpen Catcher); 51 Carl Willis (Pitching)

=== Game log ===
2005 Game Log: 93–69 (Home: 43–38; Away: 50–31)
April: 9–14 (Home: 3–7; Away: 6–7)

#	Date	Opponent	Score	Win	Loss	Save	Stadium	Attendance	Record	Streak
1	April 4	@ White Sox	0–1	Buehrle (1–0)	**Westbrook** (0–1)	Takatsu (1)	U.S. Cellular Field	38,141	0–1	L1
2	April 6	@ White Sox	3–4	Marte (1–0)	**Wickman** (0–1)	—	U.S. Cellular Field	10,520	0–2	L2
3	April 7	@ White Sox	11–5 (11)	**Rhodes** (1–0)	Vizcaino (0–1)	—	U.S. Cellular Field	10,800	1–2	W1
4	April 8	@ Tigers	4–3	**Riske** (1–0)	Urbina (0–1)	**Wickman** (1)	Comerica Park	23,294	2–2	W2
5	April 9	@ Tigers	1–11	Ledezma (1–0)	**Westbrook** (0–2)	—	Comerica Park	26,037	2–3	L1
6	April 10	@ Tigers	7–6	**Davis** (1–0)	Bonderman (1–1)	**Wickman** (2)	Comerica Park	25,758	3–3	W1
7	April 11	White Sox	1–2	Garcia (1–0)	**Millwood** (0–1)	Takatsu (3)	**Jacobs Field**	42,461	3–4	L1
8	April 13	White Sox	4–5 (10)	Vizcaino (1–1)	**Howry** (0–1)	Hermanson (1)	**Jacobs Field**	14,410	3–5	L2
9	April 14	White Sox	8–6	**Betancourt** (1–0)	Hernandez (1–1)	**Wickman** (3)	**Jacobs Field**	12,470	4–5	W1
10	April 15	Twins	2–4	Santana (3–0)	**Westbrook** (0–3)	Nathan (3)	**Jacobs Field**	15,360	4–6	L1
11	April 16	Twins	4–6	Gassner (1–0)	**Millwood** (0–2)	Nathan (4)	**Jacobs Field**	18,699	4–7	L2
12	April 17	Twins	2–1	**Howry** (1–1)	Romero (0–1)	**Wickman** (4)	**Jacobs Field**	19,021	5–7	W1
13	April 18	@ Royals	5–1	**Lee** (1–0)	Greinke (0–1)	—	Kauffman Stadium	11,115	6–7	W2
14	April 19	@ Royals	5–6	MacDougal (1–0)	**Rhodes** (1–1)	—	Kauffman Stadium	11,884	6–8	L1
15	April 20	@ Angels	0–2	Colon (3–1)	**Westbrook** (0–4)	Rodriguez (3)	Angel Stadium of Anaheim	42,531	6–9	L2
16	April 21	@ Angels	5–6 (10)	Rodriguez (1–0)	**Davis** (1–1)	—	Angel Stadium of Anaheim	39,673	6–10	L3
17	April 22	@ Mariners	6–1	**Sabathia** (1–0)	Meche (1–1)	—	Safeco Field	43,207	7–10	W1
18	April 23	@ Mariners	5–2	**Lee** (2–0)	Sele (1–2)	**Wickman** (5)	Safeco Field	33,564	8–10	W2
19	April 24	@ Mariners	1–9	Moyer (4–0)	**Elarton** (0–1)	—	Safeco Field	32,889	8–11	L1
–	April 26	Tigers	Postponed (rain, makeup July 4)							
20	April 27	Tigers	3–10	Bonderman (3–2)	**Westbrook** (0–5)	—	**Jacobs Field**	12,162	8–12	L2
21	April 28	Tigers	2–3	Maroth (2–1)	**Millwood** (0–3)	Percival (2)	**Jacobs Field**	13,809	8–13	L3
22	April 29	Royals	6–0	**Sabathia** (2–0)	Greinke (0–2)	—	**Jacobs Field**	16,666	9–13	W1
23	April 30	Royals	1–8	Bautista (2–1)	**Lee** (2–1)	—	**Jacobs Field**	15,771	9–14	L1

May: 16–11 (Home: 8–5; Away: 8–6)

#	Date	Opponent	Score	Win	Loss	Save	Stadium	Attendance	Record	Streak
24	May 1	Royals	5–6	Wood (1–2)	**Betancourt** (1–1)	Burgos (1)	**Jacobs Field**	17,672	9–15	L2
25	May 3	@ Twins	4–2	**Westbrook** (1–5)	Mays (1–1)	**Wickman** (6)	Hubert H. Humphrey Metrodome	16,919	10–15	W1
26	May 4	@ Twins	5–4	**Howry** (2–1)	Romero (0–2)	**Wickman** (7)	Hubert H. Humphrey Metrodome	19,856	11–15	W2
27	May 5	@ Twins	0–9	Radke (3–3)	**Sabathia** (2–1)	—	Hubert H. Humphrey Metrodome	18,265	11–16	L1
28	May 6	@ Rangers	8–6	**Lee** (3–1)	Astacio (1–4)	**Wickman** (8)	Ameriquest Field in Arlington	30,742	12–16	W1
29	May 7	@ Rangers	1–6	Drese (3–3)	**Elarton** (0–2)	—	Ameriquest Field in Arlington	36,311	12–17	L1
30	May 8	@ Rangers	2–7	Rogers (3–2)	**Westbrook** (1–6)	Cordero (10)	Ameriquest Field in Arlington	23,203	12–18	L2
31	May 9	@ Angels	3–0	**Millwood** (1–3)	Lackey (3–2)	**Wickman** (9)	Angel Stadium of Anaheim	36,763	13–18	W1
32	May 10	@ Angels	4–5	Byrd (3–3)	**Sabathia** (2–2)	Rodriguez (9)	Angel Stadium of Anaheim	38,320	13–19	L1
33	May 11	@ Angels	8–3	**Lee** (4–1)	Escobar (1–2)	—	Angel Stadium of Anaheim	35,508	14–19	W1
34	May 13	Blue Jays	6–4	**Davis** (2–1)	Lilly (1–4)	**Wickman** (10)	**Jacobs Field**	19,637	15–19	W2
35	May 14	Blue Jays	3–2	**Rhodes** (2–1)	Frasor (1–3)	**Wickman** (11)	**Jacobs Field**	22,525	16–19	W3
36	May 15	Blue Jays	2–5	Halladay (6–2)	**Sabathia** (2–3)	—	**Jacobs Field**	23,446	16–20	L1
37	May 16	Angels	1–3	Byrd (4–3)	**Lee** (4–2)	Shields (3)	**Jacobs Field**	13,729	16–21	L2
38	May 17	Angels	13–5	**Elarton** (1–2)	Santana (0–1)	—	**Jacobs Field**	15,033	17–21	W1
39	May 18	Angels	1–2	Colon (5–3)	**Westbrook** (1–7)	Shields (4)	**Jacobs Field**	19,030	17–22	L1
40	May 20	@ Reds	1–2	Harang (3–2)	**Millwood** (1–4)	Graves (10)	Great American Ball Park	25,412	17–23	L2
41	May 21	@ Reds	5–3	**Sabathia** (3–3)	Ramirez (0–2)	**Wickman** (12)	Great American Ball Park	31,083	18–23	W1
42	May 22	@ Reds	9–2	**Lee** (5–2)	Ortiz (1–3)	—	Great American Ball Park	21,862	19–23	W2
43	May 23	Twins	2–1	**Rhodes** (3–1)	Lohse (3–3)	**Wickman** (13)	**Jacobs Field**	13,257	20–23	W3
44	May 24	Twins	3–6 (11)	Crain (4–0)	**Riske** (1–1)	Nathan (13)	**Jacobs Field**	15,884	20–24	L1
45	May 25	Twins	3–2 (10)	**Howry** (3–1)	Rincon (2–2)	—	**Jacobs Field**	15,794	21–24	W1
46	May 26	Twins	4–5 (11)	Crain (5–0)	**Riske** (1–2)	Nathan (14)	**Jacobs Field**	19,161	21–25	L1
47	May 27	Athletics	4–1	**Lee** (6–2)	Zito (1–6)	**Riske** (1)	**Jacobs Field**	19,711	22–25	W1
48	May 28	Athletics	6–3	**Elarton** (2–2)	Saarloos (1–4)	**Howry** (1)	**Jacobs Field**	33,646	23–25	W2
49	May 29	Athletics	6–2	**Westbrook** (2–7)	Etherton (1–1)	**Miller** (1)	**Jacobs Field**	25,737	24–25	W3
50	May 31	@ Twins	4–3	**Sabathia** (4–3)	Silva (3–3)	**Wickman** (14)	Hubert H. Humphrey Metrodome	15,494	25–25	W4

June: 17–10 (Home: 8–4; Away: 9–6)

#	Date	Opponent	Score	Win	Loss	Save	Stadium	Attendance	Record	Streak
51	June 1	@ Twins	2–6	Radke (5–4)	**Lee** (6–3)	—	Hubert H. Humphrey Metrodome	20,739	25–26	L1
52	June 2	@ Twins	3–4 (13)	Romero (1–2)	**Betancourt** (1–2)	—	Hubert H. Humphrey Metrodome	17,351	25–27	L2
53	June 3	@ White Sox	4–6	Hernandez (6–1)	**Westbrook** (2–8)	Hermanson (12)	U.S. Cellular Field	23,132	25–28	L3
54	June 4	@ White Sox	5–6	Garland (9–2)	**Davis** (2–2)	Hermanson (13)	U.S. Cellular Field	26,365	25–29	L4
55	June 5	@ White Sox	6–4 (12)	**Riske** (2–2)	Hermanson (0–1)	—	U.S. Cellular Field	26,146	26–29	W1
56	June 7	@ Padres	2–0 (11)	**Betancourt** (2–2)	Hoffman (0–2)	**Wickman** (15)	Petco Park	25,047	27–29	W2
57	June 8	@ Padres	6–1	**Elarton** (3–2)	Peavy (5–1)	**Howry** (2)	Petco Park	29,464	28–29	W3
58	June 9	@ Padres	2–3	Eaton (9–1)	**Westbrook** (2–9)	Hoffman (17)	Petco Park	27,149	28–30	L1
59	June 10	@ Giants	10–2	**Sabathia** (5–3)	Tomko (5–8)	—	SBC Park	37,102	29–30	W1
60	June 11	@ Giants	7–6	**Davis** (3–2)	Schmidt (3–3)	**Wickman** (16)	SBC Park	39,961	30–30	W2
61	June 12	@ Giants	5–3	**Lee** (7–3)	Rueter (2–5)	**Wickman** (17)	SBC Park	41,500	31–30	W3
62	June 14	Rockies	11–2	**Westbrook** (3–9)	Francis (5–4)	—	**Jacobs Field**	17,631	32–30	W4
63	June 15	Rockies	7–6 (11)	**Howry** (4–1)	Neal (1–3)	—	**Jacobs Field**	20,986	33–30	W5
64	June 16	Rockies	2–1	**Millwood** (2–4)	Wright (4–6)	**Wickman** (18)	**Jacobs Field**	19,244	34–30	W6
65	June 17	Diamondbacks	13–6	**Lee** (8–3)	Halsey (4–5)	—	**Jacobs Field**	23,138	35–30	W7
66	June 18	Diamondbacks	3–1	**Elarton** (4–2)	Webb (7–3)	**Wickman** (19)	**Jacobs Field**	28,306	35–30	W8
67	June 19	Diamondbacks	3–2	**Westbrook** (4–9)	Estes (5–5)	**Wickman** (20)	**Jacobs Field**	27,416	37–30	W9
68	June 20	Red Sox	9–10	Wells (6–4)	**Sabathia** (5–4)	Foulke (14)	**Jacobs Field**	30,562	37–31	L1
69	June 21	Red Sox	2–9	Arroyo (6–3)	**Millwood** (2–5)	—	**Jacobs Field**	28,450	37–32	L2
70	June 22	Red Sox	4–5	Foulke (5–3)	**Wickman** (0–2)	—	**Jacobs Field**	29,915	37–33	L3
71	June 24	Reds	4–5	Mercker (2–1)	**Howry** (4–2)	Weathers (3)	**Jacobs Field**	27,129	37–34	L4
72	June 25	Reds	12–7	**Westbrook** (5–9)	Hudson (1–2)	—	**Jacobs Field**	42,521	38–34	W1
73	June 26	Reds	4–3	**Howry** (5–2)	Weathers (4–1)	**Wickman** (21)	**Jacobs Field**	29,355	39–34	W2
74	June 27	@ Red Sox	7–0	**Millwood** (3–5)	Arroyo (6–4)	—	Fenway Park	35,458	40–34	W3
75	June 28	@ Red Sox	12–8	**Miller** (1–0)	Foulke (5–4)	—	Fenway Park	35,445	41–34	W4
76	June 29	@ Red Sox	2–5	Wakefield (7–6)	**Elarton** (4–3)	Timlin (1)	Fenway Park	35,069	41–35	L1
77	June 30	@ Orioles	9–3	**Westbrook** (6–9)	Penn (2–2)	—	Oriole Park at Camden Yards	27,272	42–35	W1

July: 13–16 (Home: 6–9; Away: 7–7)

#	Date	Opponent	Score	Win	Loss	Save	Stadium	Attendance	Record	Streak
78	July 1	@ Orioles	3–1	**Sabathia** (6–4)	Lopez (7–4)	**Wickman** (22)	Oriole Park at Camden Yards	26,407	43–35	W2
79	July 2	@ Orioles	0–4	Cabrera (6–7)	**Millwood** (3–6)	—	Oriole Park at Camden Yards	38,059	43–36	L1
80	July 3	@ Orioles	9–4	**Lee** (9–3)	Ponson (7–6)	—	Oriole Park at Camden Yards	41,655	44–36	W1
81	July 4 (1)	Tigers	9–3	**Elarton** (5–3)	Johnson (5–7)	—	**Jacobs Field**	26,869	45–36	W2
82	July 4 (2)	Tigers	6–0	**Davis** (4–2)	Verlander (0–1)	—	**Jacobs Field**	33,599	46–36	W3
83	July 5	Tigers	2–3	Maroth (6–9)	**Westbrook** (6–10)	Percival (6)	**Jacobs Field**	18,478	46–37	L1
84	July 6	Tigers	3–7	Bonderman (11–5)	**Sabathia** (6–5)	Percival (7)	**Jacobs Field**	22,539	46–38	L2
85	July 7	@ Yankees	2–7	Mussina (9–5)	**Millwood** (3–7)	—	Yankee Stadium	52,201	46–39	L3
86	July 8	@ Yankees	4–5	Wang (6–3)	**Lee** (9–4)	Rivera (19)	Yankee Stadium	52,938	46–40	L4
87	July 9	@ Yankees	8–7	**Elarton** (6–3)	May (1–4)	**Wickman** (23)	Yankee Stadium	54,366	47–40	W1
88	July 10	@ Yankees	4–9	R. Johnson (9–6)	**Westbrook** (6–11)	Rivera (20)	Yankee Stadium	54,256	47–41	L1
–	July 12	76th All-Star Game	National League vs. American League (Comerica Park, Detroit, Michigan)							
89	July 14	White Sox	0–1	Contreras (5–5)	**Millwood** (3–8)	Hermanson (22)	**Jacobs Field**	21,472	47–42	L2
90	July 15	White Sox	1–7	Garcia (9–3)	**Sabathia** (6–6)	—	**Jacobs Field**	29,684	47–43	L3
91	July 16	White Sox	5–7	Buehrle (11–3)	**Westbrook** (6–12)	Marte (3)	**Jacobs Field**	27,114	47–44	L4
92	July 17	White Sox	0–4	Garland (14–4)	**Elarton** (6–4)	—	**Jacobs Field**	24,548	47–45	L5
93	July 18	Royals	6–2 (5)	**Lee** (10–4)	Carrasco (4–4)	—	**Jacobs Field**	18,073	48–45	W1
94	July 19	Royals	0–4	Greinke (3–11)	**Millwood** (3–9)	—	**Jacobs Field**	20,862	48–46	L1
95	July 20	Royals	3–5	Lima (3–8)	**Sabathia** (6–7)	MacDougal (13)	**Jacobs Field**	21,860	48–47	L2
96	July 21	Royals	10–1	**Westbrook** (7–12)	Howell (1–4)	—	**Jacobs Field**	24,694	49–47	W1
97	July 22	Mariners	3–4	Putz (3–3)	**Elarton** (6–5)	Guardado (22)	**Jacobs Field**	27,208	49–48	L1
98	July 23	Mariners	4–3	**Lee** (11–4)	Meche (10–7)	**Wickman** (24)	**Jacobs Field**	28,498	50–48	W1
99	July 24	Mariners	6–3	**Millwood** (4–9)	Sele (6–11)	—	**Jacobs Field**	22,863	51–48	W2
100	July 25	@ Athletics	4–13	Zito (9–8)	**Sabathia** (6–8)	Yabu (1)	McAfee Coliseum	19,242	51–49	L1
101	July 26	@ Athletics	2–0	**Westbrook** (8–12)	Blanton (5–9)	**Wickman** (25)	McAfee Coliseum	18,606	52–49	W1
102	July 27	@ Athletics	4–5 (10)	Street (4–1)	**Riske** (2–3)	—	McAfee Coliseum	40,331	52–50	L1
103	July 28	@ Mariners	6–5	**Howry** (6–2)	Putz (4–4)	**Wickman** (26)	Safeco Field	28,500	53–50	W1
104	July 29	@ Mariners	10–5	**Millwood** (5–9)	Sele (6–12)	—	Safeco Field	32,966	54–50	W2
105	July 30	@ Mariners	2–3	Franklin (6–11)	**Sabathia** (6–9)	Guardado (24)	Safeco Field	37,719	54–51	L1
106	July 31	@ Mariners	9–7	**Westbrook** (9–12)	Pineiro (3–7)	**Wickman** (27)	Safeco Field	33,652	55–51	W1

August: 19–8 (Home: 8–6; Away: 11–2)

#	Date	Opponent	Score	Win	Loss	Save	Stadium	Attendance	Record	Streak
107	August 2	Yankees	6–5	**Elarton** (7–5)	Leiter (4–10)	**Wickman** (28)	**Jacobs Field**	34,457	56–51	W3
108	August 3	Yankees	7–4	**Lee** (12–4)	Mussina (10–7)	**Wickman** (29)	**Jacobs Field**	35,737	57–51	W4
109	August 4	Yankees	3–4	Gordon (5–4)	**Wickman** (0–3)	Rivera (27)	**Jacobs Field**	40,048	57–52	L1
110	August 5	@ Tigers	9–6	**Sabathia** (7–9)	Robertson (5–10)	**Howry** (3)	Comerica Park	38,928	58–52	W1
111	August 6	@ Tigers	4–2	**Westbrook** (10–12)	Bonderman (13–8)	**Wickman** (30)	Comerica Park	39,817	59–52	W2
112	August 7	@ Tigers	6–5	**Riske** (3–3)	Rodney (1–2)	**Wickman** (31)	Comerica Park	34,553	60–52	W3
113	August 9	@ Royals	13–7	**Sauerbeck** (1–0)	MacDougal (2–4)	—	Kauffman Stadium	15,182	61–52	W4
114	August 10	@ Royals	6–1	**Sabathia** (8–9)	Greinke (3–14)	—	Kauffman Stadium	16,061	62–52	W5
115	August 11	@ Royals	4–2	**Millwood** (6–9)	Carrasco (5–6)	**Wickman** (32)	Kauffman Stadium	14,506	63–52	W6
116	August 12	Devil Rays	6–8	Hendrickson (7–7)	**Westbrook** (10–13)	Baez (24)	**Jacobs Field**	22,597	63–53	L1
117	August 13	Devil Rays	2–8	McClung (3–7)	**Elarton** (7–6)	—	**Jacobs Field**	34,765	63–54	L2
118	August 14	Devil Rays	0–1	Borowski (1–0)	**Wickman** (0–4)	Baez (25)	**Jacobs Field**	25,361	63–55	L3
119	August 16	Rangers	8–2	**Sabathia** (9–9)	Rogers (11–6)	—	**Jacobs Field**	27,403	64–55	W1
120	August 17	Rangers	0–3	Young (10–7)	**Millwood** (6–10)	Cordero (27)	**Jacobs Field**	20,442	64–56	L1
121	August 18	Rangers	9–4	**Westbrook** (11–13)	Wilson (0–6)	—	**Jacobs Field**	23,214	65–56	W1
122	August 19	Orioles	5–4 (10)	**Cabrera** (1–0)	Kline (2–4)	—	**Jacobs Field**	33,160	66–56	W2
123	August 20	Orioles	6–1	**Lee** (13–4)	Lopez (12–7)	—	**Jacobs Field**	41,034	67–56	W3
124	August 21	Orioles	5–1	**Sabathia** (10–9)	Chen (10–7)	—	**Jacobs Field**	28,025	68–56	W4
125	August 22	@ Devil Rays	11–4	**Millwood** (7–10)	Miller (1–1)	—	Tropicana Field	8,564	69–56	W5
126	August 23	@ Devil Rays	5–4	**Westbrook** (12–13)	Miller (1–2)	**Wickman** (33)	Tropicana Field	8,648	70–56	W6
127	August 24	@ Devil Rays	3–13	McClung (5–7)	**Elarton** (7–7)	—	Tropicana Field	11,261	70–57	L1
128	August 25	@ Devil Rays	12–4	**Lee** (14–4)	Kazmir (7–9)	—	Tropicana Field	9,172	71–57	W1
129	August 26	@ Blue Jays	9–3	**Sabathia** (11–9)	McGowan (1–2)	—	Rogers Centre	24,649	72–57	W2
130	August 27	@ Blue Jays	1–2	Downs (2–3)	**Millwood** (7–11)	Batista (24)	Rogers Centre	27,630	72–58	L1
131	August 28	@ Blue Jays	4–1	**Westbrook** (13–13)	Towers (10–10)	**Wickman** (34)	Rogers Centre	31,785	73–58	W1
132	August 29	Tigers	10–8	**Cabrera** (2–0)	Bonderman (14–11)	**Wickman** (35)	**Jacobs Field**	22,713	74–58	W2
–	August 30	Tigers	Postponed (rain, makeup September 8)							
133	August 31	Tigers	3–4	Maroth (12–12)	**Betancourt** (2–3)	Rodney (7)	**Jacobs Field**	22,091	74–59	L1

September: 19–8 (Home: 10–4; Away: 9–4)

#	Date	Opponent	Score	Win	Loss	Save	Stadium	Attendance	Record	Streak
134	September 2	@ Twins	6–1	**Sabathia** (12–9)	Radke (8–11)	—	Hubert H. Humphrey Metrodome	16,119	75–59	W1
135	September 3	@ Twins	2–3	Nathan (7–3)	**Howry** (6–3)	—	Hubert H. Humphrey Metrodome	21,757	75–60	L1
136	September 4	@ Twins	5–7	Crain (10–4)	**Westbrook** (13–14)	Nathan (35)	Hubert H. Humphrey Metrodome	21,717	75–61	L2
137	September 5	@ Tigers	2–0	**Elarton** (8–7)	Maroth (12–13)	**Wickman** (36)	Comerica Park	26,150	76–61	W1
138	September 6	@ Tigers	6–1	**Lee** (15–4)	Johnson (7–12)	—	Comerica Park	15,308	77–61	W2
139	September 7	@ Tigers	4–1	**Sabathia** (13–9)	Colon (2–6)	—	Comerica Park	13,193	78–61	W3
140	September 8	Tigers	4–2	**Betancourt** (3–3)	Robertson (6–13)	**Wickman** (37)	**Jacobs Field**	20,363	79–61	W4
141	September 9	Twins	4–2	**Westbrook** (14–14)	Santana (13–7)	**Wickman** (38)	**Jacobs Field**	26,078	80–61	W5
142	September 10	Twins	7–5	**Elarton** (9–7)	Baker (1–2)	**Wickman** (39)	**Jacobs Field**	32,123	81–61	W6
143	September 11	Twins	12–4	**Lee** (16–4)	Silva (9–8)	—	**Jacobs Field**	38,564	82–61	W7
144	September 12	Athletics	0–2	Haren (13–10)	**Sabathia** (13–10)	Street (21)	**Jacobs Field**	20,282	82–62	L1
145	September 13	Athletics	5–2	**Millwood** (8–11)	Duchscherer (6–4)	**Wickman** (40)	**Jacobs Field**	21,564	83–62	W1
146	September 14	Athletics	6–4	**Westbrook** (15–14)	Zito (13–12)	**Wickman** (41)	**Jacobs Field**	21,920	84–62	W2
147	September 16	Royals	3–1	**Elarton** (10–7)	Gobble (1–1)	**Wickman** (42)	**Jacobs Field**	21,975	85–62	W3
148	September 17	Royals	5–4	**Lee** (17–4)	Hernandez (8–12)	**Wickman** (43)	**Jacobs Field**	32,392	86–62	W4
149	September 18	Royals	11–0	**Sabathia** (14–10)	Lima (5–16)	—	**Jacobs Field**	22,654	87–62	W5
150	September 19	@ White Sox	7–5	**Betancourt** (4–3)	Marte (3–4)	**Wickman** (44)	U.S. Cellular Field	35,748	88–62	W6
151	September 20	@ White Sox	6–7 (10)	Hermanson (2–4)	**Riske** (3–4)	—	U.S. Cellular Field	26,147	88–63	L1
152	September 21	@ White Sox	8–0	**Elarton** (11–7)	Garland (17–10)	—	U.S. Cellular Field	36,543	89–63	W1
153	September 22	@ Royals	11–6	**Lee** (18–4)	Sisco (2–4)	**Betancourt** (1)	Kauffman Stadium	10,028	90–63	W2
154	September 23	@ Royals	7–6	**Howry** (7–3)	MacDougal (4–6)	**Wickman** (45)	Kauffman Stadium	12,519	91–63	W3
155	September 24	@ Royals	11–4	**Millwood** (9–11)	Wood (5–8)	—	Kauffman Stadium	17,358	92–63	W4
156	September 25	@ Royals	4–5	MacDougal (5–6)	**Howry** (7–4)	—	Kauffman Stadium	11,453	92–64	L1
157	September 27	Devil Rays	4–5	Kazmir (10–9)	**Elarton** (11–8)	Baez (40)	**Jacobs Field**	23,795	92–65	L2
158	September 28	Devil Rays	0–1	McClung (7–11)	**Lee** (18–5)	Baez (41)	**Jacobs Field**	24,356	92–66	L3
159	September 29	Devil Rays	6–0	**Sabathia** (15–10)	Fossum (8–12)	—	**Jacobs Field**	25,870	93–66	W1
160	September 30	White Sox	2–3 (13)	Politte (7–1)	**Cabrera** (2–1)	Jenks (5)	**Jacobs Field**	41,072	93–67	L1

October: 0–2 (Home: 0–2; Away: 0–0)

#	Date	Opponent	Score	Win	Loss	Save	Stadium	Attendance	Record	Streak
161	October 1	White Sox	3–4	Garland (18–10)	**Westbrook** (15–15)	Jenks (6)	**Jacobs Field**	41,026	93–68	L2
162	October 2	White Sox	1–3	McCarthy (3–2)	**Elarton** (11–9)	Hernandez (1)	**Jacobs Field**	41,034	93–69	L3

Legend: = Win = Loss = Postponement
Bold = Indians team member

== Player stats ==
=== Batting ===
Note: G = Games played; AB = At bats; R = Runs scored; H = Hits; 2B = Doubles; 3B = Triples; HR = Home runs; RBI = Runs batted in; AVG = Batting average; SB = Stolen bases

Player	G	AB	R	H	2B	3B	HR	RBI	AVG	SB
Josh Bard	34	83	6	16	4	0	1	9	.193	0
Ronnie Belliard	145	536	71	152	36	1	17	78	.284	2
Rafael Betancourt	2	0	0	0	0	0	0	0	—	0
Casey Blake	147	523	72	126	32	1	23	58	.241	4
Aaron Boone	143	511	61	124	19	1	16	60	.243	9
Ben Broussard	142	466	59	119	30	5	19	68	.255	2
Alex Cora	49	146	11	30	5	2	1	8	.205	6
Coco Crisp	145	594	86	178	42	4	16	69	.300	15
Jason Davis	1	2	0	0	0	0	0	0	.000	0
Jason Dubois	14	45	6	10	0	0	2	2	.222	0
Scott Elarton	1	2	0	0	0	0	0	0	.000	0
Ryan Garko	1	1	0	0	0	0	0	0	.000	0
Jody Gerut	44	138	12	38	9	1	1	12	.275	1
Juan González	1	1	0	0	0	0	0	0	.000	0
Franklin Gutierrez	7	1	2	0	0	0	0	0	.000	0
Travis Hafner	137	486	94	148	42	0	33	108	.305	0
José Hernández	84	234	28	54	7	0	6	31	.231	1
Bob Howry	6	1	0	0	0	0	0	0	.000	0
Cliff Lee	3	8	0	0	0	0	0	0	.000	0
Jeff Liefer	19	56	5	11	2	0	1	8	.196	0
Ryan Ludwick	19	41	8	9	0	0	4	5	.220	0
Victor Martinez	147	547	73	167	33	0	20	80	.305	0
Matt Miller	2	0	0	0	0	0	0	0	—	0
Kevin Millwood	1	2	0	0	0	0	0	0	.000	0
Jhonny Peralta	141	504	82	147	35	4	24	78	.292	0
Brandon Phillips	6	9	1	0	0	0	0	0	.000	0
Arthur Rhodes	2	0	0	0	0	0	0	0	—	0
CC Sabathia	2	6	1	2	1	0	1	4	.333	0
Scott Sauerbeck	4	0	0	0	0	0	0	0	—	0
Grady Sizemore	158	640	111	185	37	11	22	81	.289	22
Ramón Vázquez	12	24	1	6	3	0	0	1	.250	0
Jake Westbrook	1	2	0	0	0	0	0	0	.000	0
Bob Wickman	4	0	0	0	0	0	0	0	—	0
Team totals	162	5609	790	1522	337	30	207	760	.271	62

=== Pitching ===
Note: W = Wins; L = Losses; ERA = Earned run average; G = Games pitched; GS = Games started; SV = Saves; IP = Innings pitched; H = Hits allowed; R = Runs allowed; ER = Earned runs allowed; BB = Walks allowed; K = Strikeouts

Player	W	L	ERA	G	GS	SV	IP	H	R	ER	BB	K
Rafael Betancourt	4	3	2.79	54	0	1	67.2	57	23	21	17	73
Fernando Cabrera	2	1	1.47	15	0	0	30.2	24	7	5	11	29
Jason Davis	4	2	4.69	11	4	0	40.1	44	22	21	20	32
Scott Elarton	11	9	4.61	31	31	0	181.2	189	100	93	48	103
Jeremy Guthrie	0	0	6.00	1	0	0	6.0	9	4	4	2	3
Bob Howry	7	4	2.47	79	0	3	73.0	49	23	20	16	48
Cliff Lee	18	5	3.79	32	32	0	202.0	194	91	85	52	143
Matt Miller	1	0	1.82	23	0	1	29.2	22	6	6	10	23
Kevin Millwood	9	11	2.86	30	30	0	192.0	182	72	61	52	146
Arthur Rhodes	3	1	2.08	47	0	0	43.1	33	13	10	12	43
David Riske	3	4	3.10	58	0	1	72.2	55	28	25	15	48
CC Sabathia	15	10	4.03	31	31	0	196.2	185	92	88	62	161
Scott Sauerbeck	1	0	4.04	58	0	0	35.2	35	18	16	16	35
Kaz Tadano	0	0	2.25	1	0	0	4.0	4	1	1	0	1
Brian Tallet	0	0	7.71	2	0	0	4.2	6	4	4	3	2
Jake Westbrook	15	15	4.49	34	34	0	210.2	218	121	105	56	119
Bob Wickman	0	4	2.47	64	0	45	62.0	57	17	17	21	41
Team totals	93	69	3.61	162	162	51	1452.2	1363	642	582	413	1050

== Awards and honors ==
All-Star Game

== Minor league affiliates ==
Classification level	Team	League	Season article
AAA	Buffalo Bisons	International League	2005 Buffalo Bisons season
AA	Akron Aeros	Eastern League	2005 Akron Aeros season
Advanced A	Kinston Indians	Carolina League	
A	Lake County Captains	South Atlantic League	
Short Season A	Mahoning Valley Scrappers	New York–Penn League	
Rookie	Burlington Indians	Appalachian League	
