= 2005 New York Yankees season =

Season for the Major League Baseball team the New York Yankees

2005 New York Yankees
- American League East champions
- League: American League
- Division: East
- Ballpark: Yankee Stadium
- City: New York
- Record: 95–67 (.586)
- Divisional place: 1st
- Owners: George Steinbrenner
- General managers: Brian Cashman
- Managers: Joe Torre
- Television: WWOR-TV; YES Network (Michael Kay, Jim Kaat, Ken Singleton, Bobby Murcer, Paul O'Neill, David Justice)
- Radio: WCBS (AM) (John Sterling, Suzyn Waldman); WKDM (Francisco X. Rivera, Beto Villa)

The 2005 New York Yankees season was the 103rd season for the New York Yankees franchise. The team finished the regular season with a record of 95–67, tied with the Boston Red Sox, but won the division due to winning the season series 10–9 over Boston. New York was managed by Joe Torre. The Yankees played at Yankee Stadium. In the playoffs, they lost in the ALDS in 5 games to the Los Angeles Angels of Anaheim. It was their eleventh year making the playoffs in a row.

== Offseason ==
- December 3, 2004: Kenny Lofton was traded by the New York Yankees to the Philadelphia Phillies for Félix Rodríguez.
- December 3, 2004: Félix Heredia was traded by the New York Yankees to the New York Mets for Mike Stanton.
- December 20, 2004: Carl Pavano signed as a free agent with the New York Yankees.
- December 28, 2004: Jaret Wright signed as a free agent with the New York Yankees.
- January 11, 2005: Javier Vázquez, Brad Halsey, Dioner Navarro, and cash were traded by New York Yankees to the Arizona Diamondbacks for Randy Johnson.
- January 21, 2005: Aaron Small signed as a free agent with the New York Yankees.
- February 9, 2005: Buddy Groom signed as a free agent with the New York Yankees.
- February 18, 2005: Ramiro Mendoza signed as a free agent with the New York Yankees.

== Regular season ==
=== Season standings ===
AL East
Team	W	L	Pct.	GB	Home	Road
New York Yankees	95	67	.586	—	53‍–‍28	42‍–‍39
Boston Red Sox	95	67	.586	—	54‍–‍27	41‍–‍40
Toronto Blue Jays	80	82	.494	15	43‍–‍38	37‍–‍44
Baltimore Orioles	74	88	.457	21	36‍–‍45	38‍–‍43
Tampa Bay Devil Rays	67	95	.414	28	40‍–‍41	27‍–‍54

=== Record vs. opponents ===
2005 American League record Source: MLB Standings Grid – 2005
Team	BAL	BOS	CWS	CLE	DET	KC	LAA	MIN	NYY	OAK	SEA	TB	TEX	TOR	NL
Baltimore	—	8–10	2–6	1–6	3–5	4–2	2–4	3–3	7–11	4–6	7–3	12–6	4–6	9–10	8–10
Boston	10–8	—	4–3	4–2	6–4	4–2	6–4	4–2	9–10	6–4	3–3	13–6	7–2	7–11	12–6
Chicago	6–2	3–4	—	14–5	14–5	13–5	4–6	11–7	3–3	2–7	6–3	4–2	3–6	4–2	12–6
Cleveland	6–1	2–4	5–14	—	12–6	13–6	3–5	10–9	3–4	6–3	7–3	4–6	3–3	4–2	15–3
Detroit	5–3	4–6	5–14	6–12	—	10–9	4–6	8–11	1–5	1–5	5–4	5–2	4–2	4–3	9–9
Kansas City	2–4	2–4	5–13	6–13	9–10	—	2–7	6–13	3–3	2–4	2–7	3–5	2–8	3–6	9–9
Los Angeles	4–2	4–6	6–4	5–3	6–4	7–2	—	6–4	6–4	10–9	9–9	4–5	15–4	1–5	12–6
Minnesota	3–3	2–4	7–11	9–10	11–8	13–6	4–6	—	3–3	4–6	6–4	6–0	3–6	4–2	8–10
New York	11–7	10–9	3–3	4–3	5–1	3–3	4–6	3–3	—	7–2	7–3	8–11	7–3	12–6	11–7
Oakland	6–4	4–6	7–2	3–6	5–1	4–2	9–10	6–4	2–7	—	12–6	4–5	11–8	5–5	10–8
Seattle	3–7	3–3	3–6	3–7	4–5	7–2	9–9	4–6	3–7	6–12	—	4–2	6–13	4–6	10–8
Tampa Bay	6–12	6–13	2–4	6–4	2–5	5–3	5–4	0–6	11–8	5–4	2–4	—	6–2	8–11	3–15
Texas	6–4	2–7	6–3	3–3	2–4	8–2	4–15	6–3	3–7	8–11	13–6	2–6	—	7–3	9–9
Toronto	10–9	11–7	2–4	2–4	3–4	6–3	5–1	2–4	6–12	5–5	6–4	11–8	3–7	—	8–10

=== Notable transactions ===
- July 1, 2005: Mike Stanton was released by the Yankees.
- July 30, 2005: Alan Embree was signed as a free agent by the Yankees.
- July 31, 2005: Buddy Groom was sent to the Arizona Diamondbacks by the New York Yankees as part of a conditional deal.
- August 30, 2005: Mark Bellhorn was signed as a free agent with the New York Yankees.

=== Roster ===
2005 New York Yankees
Roster
Pitchers: 31 Jason Anderson; 58 Colter Bean; 27 Kevin Brown; 39 Shawn Chacón; 61,58 Jorge De Paula; 46 Alan Embree; 48 Wayne Franklin; 36 Tom Gordon; 58 Alex Graman; 38 Buddy Groom; 58 Sean Henn; 41 Randy Johnson; 31 Steve Karsay; 19 Al Leiter; 46 Darrell May; 38 Ramiro Mendoza; 35 Mike Mussina; 45 Carl Pavano; 43 Scott Proctor; 48 Paul Quantrill; 29 Tim Redding; 42 Mariano Rivera; 47 Félix Rodríguez; 31 Aaron Small; 29 Mike Stanton; 56 Tanyon Sturtze; 40 Chien-Ming Wang; 33 Jaret Wright	Catchers: 17 John Flaherty; 60 Wil Nieves; 20 Jorge Posada; Infielders: 26 Mark Bellhorn; 14,22 Robinson Canó; 29 Félix Escalona; 25 Jason Giambi; 2 Derek Jeter; 14 Russ Johnson; 24 Tino Martinez; 39,18,14 Andy Phillips; 13 Alex Rodriguez; 26 Rey Sánchez	Outfielders: 39 Melky Cabrera; 19,18 Bubba Crosby; 50 Matt Lawton; 55 Hideki Matsui; 39 Kevin Reese; 11 Gary Sheffield; 28 Rubén Sierra; 58 Mike Vento; 51 Bernie Williams; 12 Tony Womack	Manager: 6 Joe Torre; Coaches: 57 Neil Allen (bullpen); 52 Joe Girardi (bench); 23 Don Mattingly (hitting); 53 Luis Sojo (third base); 34 Mel Stottlemyre (pitching); 54 Roy White (first base)

=== Game log ===
Legend
Yankees Win	Yankees Loss	Game postponed

Game Log
April (10–14)

#	Date	Opponent	Score	Win	Loss	Save	Attendance	Record	Boxscore
1	April 3	Red Sox	9–2	Johnson (1–0)	Wells (0–1)		54,818	1–0	W1
2	April 5	Red Sox	4–3	Rivera (1–0)	Foulke (0–1)		54,690	2–0	W2
3	April 6	Red Sox	3–7	Timlin (1–0)	Rivera (1–1)		55,165	2–1	L1
4	April 8	Orioles	5–12	Ponson (1–0)	Wright (0–1)		43,128	2–2	L2
5	April 9	Orioles	8–5	Sturtze (1–0)	Reed (0–1)	Rivera (1)	50,275	3–2	W1
6	April 10	Orioles	2–7	López (2–0)	Pavano (0–1)		46,797	3–3	L1
7	April 11	@ Red Sox	1–8	Wakefield (1–0)	Mussina (0–1)		33,072	3–4	L2
8	April 13	@ Red Sox	5–2	Wright (1–1)	Schilling (0–1)	Rivera (2)	35,115	4–4	W1
9	April 14	@ Red Sox	5–8	Foulke (1–1)	Gordon (0–1)		35,251	4–5	L1
10	April 15	@ Orioles	1–8	Chen (1–0)	Pavano (0–2)		48,061	4–6	L2
11	April 16	@ Orioles	6–7	Kline (2–1)	Gordon (0–2)	Ryan (2)	48,598	4–7	L3
12	April 17	@ Orioles	4–8	Cabrera (1–1)	Brown (0–1)		47,883	4–8	L4
13	April 18	Devil Rays	19–8	Wright (2–1)	Bell (1–1)		35,282	5–8	W1
14	April 19	Devil Rays	2–6	Nomo (2–1)	Johnson (1–1)		45,802	5–9	L1
15	April 20	@ Blue Jays	11–2	Pavano (1–2)	Lilly (0–2)		22,838	6–9	W1
16	April 21	@ Blue Jays	4–3	Mussina (1–1)	Chacín (3–1)	Rivera (3)	23,178	7–9	W2
17	April 22	Rangers	3–5	Young (2–1)	Brown (0–2)	Cordero (8)	42,710	7–10	L1
18	April 23	Rangers	2–10	Park (2–1)	Wright (2–2)		44,731	7–11	L2
19	April 24	Rangers	11–1	Johnson (2–1)	Astacio (1–2)		42,732	8–11	W1
20	April 26	Angels	12–4	Pavano (2–2)	Colón (3–2)		36,328	9–11	W2
21	April 27	Angels	1–5	Washburn (1–0)	Mussina (1–2)		37,934	9–12	L1
22	April 28	Angels	1–3	Lackey (2–1)	Brown (0–3)	Rodríguez (5)	51,951	9–13	L2
23	April 29	Blue Jays	0–2	Halladay (4–1)	Johnson (2–2)		40,839	9–14	L3
24	April 30	Blue Jays	4–3	Rivera (2–1)	Chulk (0–1)		47,483	10–14	W1

May (17–10)

#	Date	Opponent	Score	Win	Loss	Save	Attendance	Record	Boxscore
25	May 1	Blue Jays	6–8	Walker (1–0)	Stanton (0–1)	Batista (7)	54,224	10–15	L1
26	May 2	@ Devil Rays	6–2	Mussina (2–2)	Kazmir (0–3)		13,217	11–15	W1
27	May 3	@ Devil Rays	4–11	Waechter (1–1)	Brown (0–4)		14,824	11–16	L1
28	May 4	@ Devil Rays	8–11	Fossum (2–1)	Henn (0–1)	Báez (2)	16,452	11–17	L2
29	May 5	@ Devil Rays	2–6	Hendrickson (1–1)	Wang (0–1)		16,662	11–18	L3
30	May 6	Athletics	3–6 (10)	Dotel (1–0)	Rivera (2–2)	Calero (1)	47,973	11–19	L4
31	May 7	Athletics	5–0	Mussina (3–2)	Blanton (0–3)		52,776	12–19	W1
32	May 8	Athletics	6–0	Brown (1–4)	Harden (2–2)		47,575	13–19	W2
33	May 9	Mariners	4–3	Johnson (3–2)	Nelson (0–1)	Rivera (4)	38,079	14–19	W2
34	May 10	Mariners	7–4	Wang (1–1)	Sele (2–4)	Rivera (5)	39,780	15–19	W3
35	May 11	Mariners	13–9	Quantrill (1–0)	Thornton (0–3)		47,844	16–19	W4
36	May 13	@ Athletics	9–4	Mussina (4–2)	Harden (2–3)		38,636	17–19	W5
37	May 14	@ Athletics	15–6	Brown (2–4)	Blanton (0–4)		41,180	18–19	W6
38	May 15	@ Athletics	6–4	Johnson (4–2)	Rincón (1–1)	Rivera (6)	37,237	19–19	W7
39	May 16	@ Mariners	6–3	Wang (2–1)	Hasegawa (0–1)	Rivera (7)	37,814	20–19	W8
40	May 17	@ Mariners	6–0	Pavano (3–2)	Mateo (1–1)		35,549	21–19	W9
41	May 18	@ Mariners	6–7	Nelson (1–1)	Gordon (0–3)	Villone (1)	37,419	21–20	L1
42	May 20	@ Mets	5–2	Brown (3–4)	Zambrano (2–4)	Rivera (8)	55,740	22–20	W1
43	May 21	@ Mets	1–7	Benson (2–1)	Johnson (4–3)		55,800	22–21	L1
44	May 22	@ Mets	5–3	Pavano (4–2)	Hernández (2–2)	Rivera (9)	55,953	23–21	W1
45	May 24	Tigers	12–3	Mussina (5–2)	Ledezma (2–4)		37,099	24–21	W2
46	May 25	Tigers	4–2	Wang (3–1)	Maroth (4–4)	Rivera (10)	51,833	25–21	W3
47	May 26	Tigers	4–3	Brown (4–4)	Bonderman (5–3)	Rivera (11)	42,835	26–21	W4
48	May 27	Red Sox	6–3	Johnson (5–3)	Wakefield (4–4)	Rivera (12)	55,051	27–21	W5
49	May 28	Red Sox	1–17	Clement (6–0)	Pavano (4–3)		55,315	27–22	L1
50	May 29	Red Sox	2–7	Wells (3–4)	Mussina (5–3)		55,235	27–23	L2
51	May 31	@ Royals	3–5	Greinke (1–6)	Brown (4–5)	MacDougal (3)	18,680	27–24	L3

June (12–14)

#	Date	Opponent	Score	Win	Loss	Save	Attendance	Record	Boxscore
52	June 1	@ Royals	1–3	Carrasco (1–1)	Johnson (5–4)	MacDougal (4)	28,033	27–25	L4
53	June 2	@ Royals	2–5	Jensen (2–1)	Pavano (4–4)	Burgos (2)	25,590	27–26	L5
54	June 3	@ Twins	3–6	Lohse (5–3)	Mussina (5–4)	Nathan (16)	41,588	27–27	L6
55	June 4	@ Twins	4–3 (10)	Gordon (1–3)	Nathan (1–2)	Rivera (13)	45,553	28–27	W1
56	June 5	@ Twins	3–9	Silva (4–3)	Brown (4–6)		37,349	28–28	L1
57	June 6	@ Brewers	3–4	Davis (8–5)	Johnson (5–5)	Turnbow (9)	34,627	28–29	L2
58	June 7	@ Brewers	1–2	Sheets (2–5)	Pavano (4–5)	Turnbow (10)	35,611	28–30	L3
59	June 8	@ Brewers	12–3	Mussina (6–4)	Capuano (5–5)		37,586	29–30	W1
60	June 10	@ Cardinals	1–8	Marquis (8–3)	Wang (3–2)		50,250	29–31	L1
61	June 11	@ Cardinals	5–0	Johnson (6–5)	Mulder (7–4)	Rivera (14)	50,177	30–31	W1
62	June 12	@ Cardinals	3–5	King (1–1)	Sturtze (1–1)	Isringhausen (18)	50,372	30–32	L1
63	June 14	Pirates	9–0	Mussina (7–4)	Wells (5–5)		44,541	31–32	W1
64	June 15	Pirates	7–5 (10)	Rivera (3–2)	Mesa (0–5)		48,828	32–32	W2
65	June 16	Pirates	6–1	Johnson (7–5)	Pérez (5–5)		54,734	33–32	W3
66	June 17	Cubs	9–6	Stanton (1–1)	Ohman (2–1)	Rivera (15)	54,773	34–32	W4
67	June 18	Cubs	8–1	Wang (4–2)	Rusch (5–3)		55,284	35–32	W5
68	June 19	Cubs	6–3	Mussina (8–4)	Mitre (2–2)	Rivera (16)	55,060	36–32	W6
69	June 20	Devil Rays	4–5	Fossum (3–5)	Henn (0–2)	Báez (10)	43,543	36–33	L1
70	June 21	Devil Rays	20–11	Groom (1–0)	Harper (1–6)		40,271	37–33	W1
71	June 22	Devil Rays	3–5	Kazmir (3–5)	Pavano (4–6)	Báez (11)	48,452	37–34	L1
72	June 23	Devil Rays	4–9	Hendrickson (3–4)	Wang (4–3)	Báez (12)	45,382	37–35	L2
73	June 24	Mets	4–6	Martínez (8–2)	Mussina (8–5)		55,297	37–36	L3
74	June 25	Mets	3–10	Glavine (5–7)	Henn (0–3)		55,114	37–37	L4
75	June 26	Mets	5–4	Rivera (4–2)	Looper (2–3)		55,327	38–37	W1
76	June 27	@ Orioles	6–4	Sturtze (2–1)	Kline (2–3)	Rivera (17)	45,801	39–27	W2
77	June 28	@ Orioles	4–5 (10)	Ryan (1–1)	Stanton (1–2)		47,465	39–38	L1
	June 29	@ Orioles	Postponed (rain; rescheduled for September 26)						

July (17–9)

#	Date	Opponent	Score	Win	Loss	Save	Attendance	Record	Boxscore
78	July 1	@ Tigers	2–10	Bonderman (10–5)	Johnson (7–6)		40,776	39–39	L2
79	July 2	@ Tigers	8–4	Gordon (2–3)	Percival (1–2)		41,207	40–39	W1
80	July 3	@ Tigers	1–0	Wang (5–3)	Robertson (3–7)	Rivera (18)	40,056	41–39	W2
81	July 4	Orioles	13–8	Anderson (1–0)	Ryan (1–2)		53,844	42–39	W3
82	July 5	Orioles	12–3	Johnson (8–6)	López (7–5)		55,276	43–39	W4
83	July 7	Indians	7–2	Mussina (9–5)	Millwood (3–7)		52,201	44–39	W5
84	July 8	Indians	5–4	Wang (6–3)	Lee (9–4)	Rivera (19)	52,938	45–39	W6
85	July 9	Indians	7–8	Elarton (6–3)	May (1–4)	Wickman (23)	54,366	45–40	L1
86	July 10	Indians	9–4	Johnson (9–6)	Westbrook (6–11)	Rivera (20)	54,256	46–40	W1
All-Star Break: AL defeats NL 7–5
87	July 14	@ Red Sox	8–6	Gordon (3–3)	Schilling (1–3)	Rivera (21)	35,232	47–40	W2
88	July 15	@ Red Sox	1–17	Wells (7–5)	Redding (0–6)		35,083	47–41	L1
89	July 16	@ Red Sox	7–4	Johnson (10–6)	Clement (10–3)	Rivera (22)	34,694	48–41	W1
90	July 17	@ Red Sox	5–3	Leiter (4–7)	Wakefield (8–8)	Rivera (23)	34,802	49–41	W2
91	July 18	@ Rangers	11–10	Sturtze (3–1)	Brocail (3–2)	Rivera (24)	46,538	50–41	W3
92	July 19	@ Rangers	1–2	Loe (4–2)	Franklin (0–1)	Cordero (22)	45,208	50–42	L1
93	July 20	@ Rangers	8–4	Small (1–0)	Benoit (1–1)		45,354	51–42	W1
94	July 21	@ Angels	5–6	Colón (12–6)	Gordon (3–4)	Rodríguez (22)	44,109	51–43	L1
95	July 22	@ Angels	3–6	Lackey (8–4)	Leiter (4–8)	Rodríguez (23)	44,043	51–44	L2
96	July 23	@ Angels	6–8	Santana (5–4)	Brown (4–7)	Rodríguez (24)	44,035	51–45	L3
97	July 24	@ Angels	4–1	Mussina (10–5)	Washburn (6–6)	Rivera (25)	44,032	52–45	W1
98	July 26	Twins	4–0	Johnson (11–6)	Radke (6–10)		53,855	53–45	W2
99	July 27	Twins	3–7	Santana (10–5)	Leiter (4–9)	Nathan (28)	50,334	53–46	L1
100	July 28	Twins	6–3	Small (2–0)	Mays (5–6)	Rivera (26)	53,524	54–46	W1
101	July 29	Angels	1–4	Santana (6–4)	Mussina (10–6)	Rodríguez (26)	54,025	54–47	L1
102	July 30	Angels	8–7	Rivera (5–2)	Rodríguez (2–2)		54,220	55–47	W1
103	July 31	Angels	8–7 (11)	Gordon (4–4)	Gregg (1–2)		53,653	56–47	W2

August (19–10)

#	Date	Opponent	Score	Win	Loss	Save	Attendance	Record	Boxscore
104	August 2	@ Indians	7–8	Elarton (7–5)	Leiter (4–10)	Wickman (28)	34,457	56–48	L1
105	August 3	@ Indians	4–7	Lee (12–4)	Mussina (10–7)	Wickman (29)	35,737	56–49	L2
106	August 4	@ Indians	4–3	Gordon (5–4)	Wickman (0–3)	Rivera (27)	40,048	57–49	W1
107	August 5	@ Blue Jays	6–2	Small (3–0)	Chacín (11–6)	Rivera (28)	43,688	58–49	W2
108	August 6	@ Blue Jays	5–8	Walker (5–3)	Johnson (11–7)		48,088	58–50	L1
109	August 7	@ Blue Jays	6–2	Leiter (5–10)	Towers (8–9)	Rivera (29)	46,114	59–50	W1
110	August 8	White Sox	3–2	Mussina (11–7)	Hernández (8–5)	Rivera (30)	54,871	60–50	W2
111	August 9	White Sox	1–2	Contreras (7–6)	Chacón (1–8)	Hermanson (29)	53,946	60–51	L1
112	August 10	White Sox	1–2 (10)	Cotts (4–0)	Rivera (5–3)	Hermanson (30)	54,635	60–52	L2
113	August 11	Rangers	9–8	Sturtze (4–1)	Baldwin (0–2)	Rivera (31)	54,283	61–52	W1
114	August 12	Rangers	6–5	Leiter (6–10)	Wilson (0–5)	Sturtze (1)	54,442	62–52	W2
115	August 13	Rangers	7–5 (11)	Small (4–0)	Loe (5–4)		54,919	63–52	W3
116	August 14	Rangers	10–3	Chacón (2–8)	Benoit (3–2)		54,824	64–52	W4
117	August 15	@ Devil Rays	5–2	Wright (3–2)	Fossum (6–10)	Rivera (32)	19,320	65–52	W5
118	August 16	@ Devil Rays	3–4 (11)	Orvella (2–2)	Embree (1–5)		20,678	65–53	L1
119	August 17	@ Devil Rays	6–7	Miller (1–0)	Sturtze (4–2)	Báez (26)	20,178	65–54	L2
120	August 19	@ White Sox	3–1	Mussina (12–7)	Garland (16–7)	Rivera (33)	39,496	66–54	W1
121	August 20	@ White Sox	5–0	Chacón (3–8)	Hernández (8–6)		38,938	67–54	W2
122	August 21	@ White Sox	2–6	Contreras (8–7)	Johnson (11–8)		39,480	67–55	L1
123	August 22	Blue Jays	7–0	Wright (4–2)	Downs (1–3)		50,162	68–55	W1
124	August 23	Blue Jays	5–4	Rivera (6–3)	Batista (5–5)		50,258	69–55	W2
125	August 24	Blue Jays	5–9	Bush (3–7)	Mussina (12–8)		54,705	69–56	L1
126	August 25	Blue Jays	6–2	Chacón (4–8)	Chacín (11–7)		54,329	70–56	W1
127	August 26	Royals	5–1	Johnson (12–8)	Wood (4–5)		53,922	71–56	W2
128	August 27	Royals	8–7	Embree (2–5)	Camp (1–3)		54,452	72–56	W3
129	August 28	Royals	10–3	Leiter (7–10)	Greinke (3–16)		54,951	73–56	W4
130	August 29	@ Mariners	7–4	Small (5–0)	Thornton (0–4)	Rivera (34)	41,731	74–56	W5
131	August 30	@ Mariners	3–8	Harris (2–1)	Chacón (4–9)		37,773	74–57	L1
132	August 31	@ Mariners	2–0	Johnson (13–8)	Hernández (2–2)	Rivera (35)	46,240	75–57	W1

September–October (20–10)

#	Date	Opponent	Score	Win	Loss	Save	Attendance	Record	Boxscore
133	September 1	@ Mariners	1–5	Sherrill (3–2)	Sturtze (4–3)		39,986	75–58	L1
134	September 2	@ Athletics	0–12	Haren (12–10)	Leiter (7–11)		36,048	75–59	L2
135	September 3	@ Athletics	7–0	Small (6–0)	Saarloos (9–7)		40,076	76–59	W1
136	September 4	@ Athletics	7–3	Chacón (5–9)	Zito (12–11)		43,874	77–59	W2
137	September 6	Devil Rays	3–4	Orvella (3–2)	Rivera (6–4)	Báez (34)	48,820	77–60	L1
138	September 7	Devil Rays	5–4	Sturtze (5–3)	Borowski (1–3)	Rivera (36)	52,928	78–60	W1
139	September 8	Devil Rays	4–7	Hendrickson (9–7)	Wang (6–4)	Báez (35)	49,673	78–61	L1
140	September 9	Red Sox	8–4	Small (7–0)	Wells (12–7)		55,024	79–61	W1
141	September 10	Red Sox	2–9	Schilling (6–7)	Chacón (5–10)		55,076	79–62	L1
142	September 11	Red Sox	1–0	Johnson (14–8)	Wakefield (15–11)	Rivera (37)	55,123	80–62	W1
143	September 13	@ Devil Rays	17–3	Wright (5–2)	Waechter (5–10)		14,048	81–62	W2
144	September 14	@ Devil Rays	6–5	Wang (7–4)	Orvella (3–3)	Rivera (38)	14,396	82–62	W3
145	September 15	@ Devil Rays	9–5	Small (8–0)	McClung (6–10)	Rivera (39)	18,391	83–62	W4
146	September 16	@ Blue Jays	11–10	Proctor (1–0)	Bush (5–9)	Rivera (40)	36,543	84–62	W5
147	September 17	@ Blue Jays	1–0	Chacón (6–10)	Chacín (12–9)	Gordon (1)	43,433	85–62	W6
148	September 18	@ Blue Jays	5–6	Lilly (9–10)	Wright (5–3)	Batista (28)	39,891	85–63	L1
149	September 19	Orioles	3–2	Rivera (7–4)	DuBose (1–3)		51,521	86–63	W1
150	September 20	Orioles	12–9	Small (9–0)	Maine (2–2)		46,982	87–63	W2
151	September 21	Orioles	2–1	Johnson (15–8)	López (14–11)	Rivera (41)	50,382	88–63	W3
152	September 22	Orioles	7–6	Mussina (13–8)	Chen (12–10)	Gordon (2)	52,368	89–63	W4
153	September 23	Blue Jays	5–0	Chacón (7–10)	Lilly (9–11)		53,175	90–63	W5
154	September 24	Blue Jays	4–7	Downs (4–3)	Wright (5–4)	Batista (30)	53,911	90–64	L1
155	September 25	Blue Jays	8–4	Wang (8–4)	Towers (12–12)	Rivera (42)	55,136	91–64	W1
156	September 26	@ Orioles	11–3	Johnson (16–8)	López (14–12)		43,039	92–64	W2
157	September 27	@ Orioles	9–17	Rakers (1–0)	Leiter (7–12)		29,557	92–65	L1
158	September 28	@ Orioles	2–1	Chacón (8–10)	Cabrera (10–13)	Rivera (43)	30,539	93–65	W1
159	September 29	@ Orioles	8–4	Small (10–0)	Bédard (6–8)		36,821	94–65	W2
160	September 30	@ Red Sox	3–5	Wells (15–7)	Wang (8–5)	Timlin (13)	34,832	94–66	L1
161	October 1	@ Red Sox	8–4	Johnson (17–8)	Wakefield (16–12)		34,556	95–66	W1
162	October 2	@ Red Sox	1–10	Schilling (8–8)	Wright (5–5)		34,534	95–67	L1

Legend
Yankees Win	Yankees Loss	Game postponed

Postseason Game Log
American League Division Series VS Angels (2–3)

#	Date	Opponent	Score	Win	Loss	Save	Attendance	Record	Boxscore
1	October 4	@ Angels	4–2	Mussina (1–0)	Colón (0–1)	Rivera (1)	45,142	1–0	W1
2	October 5	@ Angels	3–5	Escobar (1–0)	Wang (0–1)	Rodríguez (1)	45,150	1–1	L1
3	October 7	Angels	7–11	Shields (1–0)	Small (0–1)		56,277	1–2	L2
4	October 9	Angels	3–2	Leiter (1–0)	Shields (1–1)	Rivera (2)	56,226	2–2	W1
5	October 10	@ Angels	3–5	Santana (1–0)	Mussina (1–1)	Rodríguez (2)	45,133	2–3	L1

== Player stats ==
=== Batting ===
==== Starters by position and other batters ====
Note: Pos = Position; G = Games played; AB = At bats; H = Hits; Avg. = Batting average; HR = Home runs; RBI = Runs batted in

Pos	Player	G	AB	H	Avg.	HR	RBI
C	Jorge Posada	142	474	124	.262	19	71
1B	Tino Martinez	131	303	73	.241	17	49
2B	Robinson Canó	132	522	155	.297	14	62
SS	Derek Jeter	159	654	202	.309	19	70
3B	Alex Rodriguez	162	605	194	.321	48	130
LF	Hideki Matsui	162	629	192	.305	23	116
CF	Bernie Williams	141	485	121	.249	12	64
RF	Gary Sheffield	154	584	170	.291	34	123
DH	Jason Giambi	139	417	113	.271	32	87
LF	Tony Womack	108	329	82	.249	0	15
DH	Rubén Sierra	61	170	39	.229	4	29
C	John Flaherty	47	127	21	.165	2	11
RF	Bubba Crosby	76	98	27	.276	1	6
RF	Matt Lawton	21	48	6	.125	2	4
2B	Rey Sanchez	23	43	12	.279	0	2
1B	Andy Phillips	27	40	6	.150	1	4
CF	Melky Cabrera	6	19	4	.211	0	0
3B	Russ Johnson	22	18	4	.222	0	0
2B	Mark Bellhorn	9	17	2	.118	1	2
SS	Félix Escalona	10	14	4	.286	0	2
C	Wil Nieves	3	4	0	.000	0	0
RF	Mike Vento	2	2	0	.000	0	0
LF	Kevin Reese	2	1	0	.000	0	0
	Pitcher totals	162	21	1	.048	0	0
	Team totals	162	5624	1552	.276	229	847

Note: Individual pitchers batting not included

=== Pitching ===
==== Starting pitchers ====
Note: G = Games pitched; GS = Games started; IP = Innings pitched; W = Wins; L = Losses; ERA = Earned run average; SO = Strikeouts

Player	G	GS	IP	W	L	ERA	SO
Randy Johnson	34	34	225.2	17	8	3.79	211
Mike Mussina	30	30	179.2	13	8	4.41	142
Chien-Ming Wang	18	17	116.1	8	5	4.02	47
Carl Pavano	17	17	100.0	4	6	4.77	56
Shawn Chacón	14	12	79.0	7	3	2.85	40
Kevin Brown	13	13	73.1	4	7	6.50	50
Jaret Wright	13	13	63.2	5	5	6.08	34
Sean Henn	3	3	11.1	0	3	11.12	3
Tim Redding	1	1	1.0	0	1	54.00	2

==== Other pitchers ====
Note: G = Games pitched; IP = Innings pitched; W = Wins; L = Losses; ERA = Earned run average; SO = Strikeouts

Player	G	IP	W	L	ERA	SO
Aaron Small	15	76.0	10	0	3.20	37
Al Leiter	16	62.1	4	5	5.49	45
Darrell May	2	7.0	0	1	16.71	3

==== Relief pitchers ====
Note: G = Games pitched; IP = Innings pitched; W = Wins; L = Losses; SV = Saves; ERA = Earned run average; SO = Strikeouts

Player	G	IP	W	L	SV	ERA	SO
Mariano Rivera	71	78.1	7	4	43	1.38	80
Tom Gordon	79	80.2	5	4	2	2.57	69
Tanyon Sturtze	64	78.0	5	3	1	4.73	45
Félix Rodríguez	34	32.1	0	0	0	5.01	18
Scott Procter	29	44.2	1	0	0	6.04	36
Mike Stanton	28	14.0	1	2	0	7.07	12
Buddy Groom	24	25.2	1	0	0	4.91	13
Alan Embree	24	14.1	1	1	0	7.53	8
Paul Quantrill	22	32.0	1	0	0	6.75	11
Wayne Franklin	13	12.2	0	1	0	6.39	10
Steve Karsay	6	6.0	0	0	0	6.00	5
Jorge De Paula	3	6.2	0	0	0	8.10	3
Jason Anderson	3	5.2	1	0	0	7.94	2
Alex Graman	2	1.1	0	0	0	13.50	0
Colter Bean	1	2.0	0	0	0	4.50	2
Ramiro Mendoza	1	1.0	0	0	0	18.00	1
Team Pitching Totals	162	1430.2	95	67	46	4.52	985

== Postseason ==
=== ALDS ===
Game	Score	Date
1	New York 4, Los Angeles 2	October 4
2	New York 3, Los Angeles 5	October 5
3	Los Angeles 11, New York 7	October 7
4	Los Angeles 2, New York 3	October 9
5	New York 3, Los Angeles 5	October 10

== Farm system ==
Level	Team	League	Manager
AAA	Columbus Clippers	International League	Bucky Dent
AA	Trenton Thunder	Eastern League	Bill Masse
A	Tampa Yankees	Florida State League	Joe Breeden
A	Charleston RiverDogs	South Atlantic League	Bill Mosiello
A-Short Season	Staten Island Yankees	New York–Penn League	Andy Stankiewicz
Rookie	GCL Yankees	Gulf Coast League	Oscar Acosta

LEAGUE CHAMPIONS: Staten Island, GCL Yankees
