= 2005 Los Angeles Angels season =

Major League Baseball season

2005 Los Angeles Angels
- American League West champions
- League: American League
- Division: West
- Ballpark: Angel Stadium
- City: Anaheim, California
- Record: 95–67 (.586)
- Divisional place: 1st
- Owner: Arte Moreno
- General manager: Bill Stoneman
- Manager: Mike Scioscia
- Television: FSN West; KCAL-9; KDOC •Rex Hudler, Steve Physioc
- Radio: KSPN (AM 710) •Terry Smith, Rory Markas; KTNQ (AM 1020—Spanish) •José Mota, Ivan Lara
- Stats: ESPN.com; Baseball Reference

The 2005 Los Angeles Angels season was the 45th season of the Angels franchise in the American League, the 40th in Anaheim, and their 40th season playing their home games at Angel Stadium. The regular season ended with a record of 95–67, resulting in the Angels winning the American League West title for the second consecutive season, their fifth in franchise history.

In the postseason, the Angels defeated the New York Yankees in the American League Division Series, 3–2, but were subsequently defeated by the eventual World Series champion Chicago White Sox in the American League Championship Series, 4–1.

The season was the first the team played under its controversial "Los Angeles Angels of Anaheim" moniker.

== Offseason ==
- October 20, 2004: Adam Riggs was released by the Anaheim Angels.
- December 14, 2004: Paul Byrd was signed as a free agent with the Anaheim Angels.

== Regular season ==
=== Season standings ===
AL West
Team	W	L	Pct.	GB	Home	Road
Los Angeles Angels	95	67	.586	—	49‍–‍32	46‍–‍35
Oakland Athletics	88	74	.543	7	45‍–‍36	43‍–‍38
Texas Rangers	79	83	.488	16	44‍–‍37	35‍–‍46
Seattle Mariners	69	93	.426	26	39‍–‍42	30‍–‍51

=== Record vs. opponents ===
2005 American League record Source: MLB Standings Grid – 2005
Team	BAL	BOS	CWS	CLE	DET	KC	LAA	MIN	NYY	OAK	SEA	TB	TEX	TOR	NL
Baltimore	—	8–10	2–6	1–6	3–5	4–2	2–4	3–3	7–11	4–6	7–3	12–6	4–6	9–10	8–10
Boston	10–8	—	4–3	4–2	6–4	4–2	6–4	4–2	9–10	6–4	3–3	13–6	7–2	7–11	12–6
Chicago	6–2	3–4	—	14–5	14–5	13–5	4–6	11–7	3–3	2–7	6–3	4–2	3–6	4–2	12–6
Cleveland	6–1	2–4	5–14	—	12–6	13–6	3–5	10–9	3–4	6–3	7–3	4–6	3–3	4–2	15–3
Detroit	5–3	4–6	5–14	6–12	—	10–9	4–6	8–11	1–5	1–5	5–4	5–2	4–2	4–3	9–9
Kansas City	2–4	2–4	5–13	6–13	9–10	—	2–7	6–13	3–3	2–4	2–7	3–5	2–8	3–6	9–9
Los Angeles	4–2	4–6	6–4	5–3	6–4	7–2	—	6–4	6–4	10–9	9–9	4–5	15–4	1–5	12–6
Minnesota	3–3	2–4	7–11	9–10	11–8	13–6	4–6	—	3–3	4–6	6–4	6–0	3–6	4–2	8–10
New York	11–7	10–9	3–3	4–3	5–1	3–3	4–6	3–3	—	7–2	7–3	8–11	7–3	12–6	11–7
Oakland	6–4	4–6	7–2	3–6	5–1	4–2	9–10	6–4	2–7	—	12–6	4–5	11–8	5–5	10–8
Seattle	3–7	3–3	3–6	3–7	4–5	7–2	9–9	4–6	3–7	6–12	—	4–2	6–13	4–6	10–8
Tampa Bay	6–12	6–13	2–4	6–4	2–5	5–3	5–4	0–6	11–8	5–4	2–4	—	6–2	8–11	3–15
Texas	6–4	2–7	6–3	3–3	2–4	8–2	4–15	6–3	3–7	8–11	13–6	2–6	—	7–3	9–9
Toronto	10–9	11–7	2–4	2–4	3–4	6–3	5–1	2–4	6–12	5–5	6–4	11–8	3–7	—	8–10

=== Roster ===
2005 Los Angeles Angels of Anaheim
Roster
Pitchers: 49 Chris Bootcheck; 36 Paul Byrd; 46 Jason Christiansen; 40 Bartolo Colón; 53 Brendan Donnelly; 45 Kelvim Escobar; 63 Kevin Gregg; 37 Greg Jones; 41 John Lackey; 58 Joel Peralta; 64 Bret Prinz; 57 Francisco Rodríguez; 54 Ervin Santana; 68 Joe Saunders; 62 Scot Shields; 56 Jarrod Washburn; 36,34 Jake Woods; 59 Esteban Yan	Catchers: 44 Jeff Mathis; 1 Bengie Molina; 28 José Molina; 8 Josh Paul; Infielders: 18 Orlando Cabrera; 17 Darin Erstad; 9 Chone Figgins; 6 Maicer Izturis; 2 Adam Kennedy; 35 Casey Kotchman; 5 Dave Matranga; 23 Dallas McPherson; 21 Lou Merloni; 39 Robb Quinlan; 51 Zach Sorensen	Outfielders: 16 Garret Anderson; 55 Jeff DaVanon; 12 Steve Finley; 27 Vladimir Guerrero; 19 Curtis Pride; 38 Chris Prieto; 20 Juan Rivera	Manager: 14 Mike Scioscia; Coaches: 24 Bud Black (pitching); 4 Alfredo Griffin (first base); 7 Mickey Hatcher (hitting); 70 Joe Maddon (bench); 48 Orlando Mercado (bullpen); 12 Ron Roenicke (third base); 61 Steve Soliz (bullpen catcher)

== Player stats ==
=== Batting ===
Note: Pos = Position; G = Games played; AB = At bats; H = Hits; Avg. = Batting average; HR = Home runs; RBI = Runs batted in

Pos	Player	G	AB	H	Avg.	HR	RBI
C	Bengie Molina	119	410	121	.295	15	69
1B	Darin Erstad	153	609	166	.273	7	66
2B	Adam Kennedy	129	416	125	.300	2	37
SS	Orlando Cabrera	141	540	139	.257	8	57
3B	Dallas McPherson	61	205	50	.244	8	26
LF	Garret Anderson	142	575	163	.283	17	96
CF	Steve Finley	112	406	90	.222	12	54
RF	Vladimir Guerrero	141	520	165	.317	32	108
DH	Jeff DaVanon	108	225	52	.231	2	15

==== Other batters ====
Note: G = Games played; AB = At bats; H = Hits; Avg. = Batting average; HR = Home runs; RBI = Runs batted in

Player	G	AB	H	Avg.	HR	RBI
Chone Figgins	158	642	186	.290	8	57
Juan Rivera	106	350	95	.271	15	59
Maicer Izturis	77	191	47	.246	1	15
José Molina	75	184	42	.228	6	25
Robb Quinlan	54	134	31	.231	5	14
Casey Kotchman	47	126	35	.278	7	22
Josh Paul	34	37	7	.189	2	4
Zach Sorensen	12	12	2	.167	0	0
Curtis Pride	11	11	1	.091	0	0
Lou Merloni	5	5	0	.000	0	1
Jeff Mathis	5	3	1	.333	0	0
Chris Prieto	2	2	0	.000	0	0
Dave Matranga	1	1	0	.000	0	0

=== Starting pitchers ===
Note: G = Games pitched; IP = Innings pitched; W = Wins; L = Losses; ERA = Earned run average; SO = Strikeouts

Player	G	IP	W	L	ERA	SO
Bartolo Colón	33	222.2	21	8	3.48	157
John Lackey	33	209.0	14	5	3.44	199
Paul Byrd	31	204.1	12	11	3.74	102
Jarrod Washburn	29	177.1	8	8	3.20	94
Ervin Santana	23	133.2	12	8	4.65	99
Joe Saunders	2	9.1	0	0	7.71	4

==== Other pitchers ====
Note: G = Games pitched; IP = Innings pitched; W = Wins; L = Losses; ERA = Earned run average; SO = Strikeouts

Player	G	IP	W	L	ERA	SO
Kelvim Escobar	16	59.2	3	2	3.02	63
Chris Bootcheck	5	18.2	0	1	3.38	8

===== Relief pitchers =====
Note: G = Games pitched; W = Wins; L = Losses; SV = Saves; ERA = Earned run average; SO = Strikeouts

Player	G	W	L	SV	ERA	SO
Francisco Rodríguez	66	2	5	45	2.67	91
Scot Shields	78	10	11	7	2.75	98
Brendan Donnelly	65	9	3	0	3.72	53
Esteban Yan	49	1	1	0	4.59	45
Kevin Gregg	33	1	2	0	5.04	52
Joel Peralta	28	1	0	0	3.89	30
Jake Woods	28	1	1	0	4.55	20
Jason Christiansen	12	0	0	0	2.45	4
Greg Jones	6	0	0	0	6.75	6
Bret Prinz	3	0	1	0	3.00	1

== Postseason ==
With their win on Monday, September 27, 2005, the Angels clinched their second straight American League West championship.

=== American League Division Series ===
The 2005 American League Division Series featured the AL West champion Los Angeles Angels of Anaheim and the AL East champion New York Yankees. The series began on October 4, 2005 with the Angels splitting the first two games at Angel Stadium. The Angels then proceeded to split the two games at Yankee Stadium and finally won the fifth game at Angel Stadium ultimately winning the series 3–2.

=== American League Championship Series ===
The 2005 American League Championship Series featured the AL West champion Los Angeles Angels of Anaheim and the AL Central champion Chicago White Sox. The series began on October 11, 2005 with the Angels winning the first game at U.S. Cellular Field, but after an incredibly controversial second game loss, the Angels dropped the next three and lost the series 4–1. Because of the controversy surrounding game two, Angel fans to this day (as of the 2013 season) give A. J. Pierzynski a poor welcome at Angel Stadium.

=== Game log ===
2005 Postseason Game Log
American League Division Series (3–2)

#	Date	Opponent	Score	Win	Loss	Save	Attendance	Record	Stadium	Boxscore
1	October 4	Yankees	4–2	Mussina (1–0)	Colón (0–1)	Rivera (1)	45,142	0–1	Angel Stadium	
2	October 5	Yankees	5–3	Escobar (1–0)	Wang (0–1)	Rodríguez (1)	45,150	1–1	Angel Stadium	
3	October 7	@ Yankees	11–7	Shields (1–0)	Small (0–1)		56,277	2–1	Yankee Stadium	
	October 8	@ Yankees	Postponed (rain); Rescheduled for October 9					2–1	Yankee Stadium	
4	October 9	@ Yankees	3–2	Leiter (1–0)	Shields (1–1)	Rivera (2)	56,226	2–2	Yankee Stadium	
5	October 10	Yankees	5–3	Santana (1–0)	Mussina (1–1)	Rodríguez (2)	45,133	3–2	Angel Stadium	

American League Championship Series (1–4)

#	Date	Opponent	Score	Win	Loss	Save	Attendance	Record	Stadium	Boxscore
1	October 11	@ White Sox	3–2	Byrd (1–0)	Contreras (1–1)	Rodríguez (3)	40,659	1–0	U.S. Cellular Field	
2	October 12	@ White Sox	2–1	Buehrle (2–0)	Escobar (1–1)		41,013	1–1	U.S. Cellular Field	
3	October 14	White Sox	5–2	Garland (1–0)	Lackey (0–1)		44,725	1–2	Angel Stadium	
4	October 15	White Sox	8–2	García (2–0)	Santana (1–1)		44,857	1–3	Angel Stadium	
5	October 16	White Sox	6–3	Contreras (2–1)	Escobar (1–2)		44,712	1–4	Angel Stadium	

Legend
Angels Win	Angels Loss	Game postponed

=== Bracket ===
Division Series (ESPN/FOX)
1	Chicago White Sox	3
4	Boston Red Sox	0
American League
2	Los Angeles Angels of Anaheim	3
3	New York Yankees	2
1	St. Louis Cardinals	3
3	San Diego Padres	0
National League
2	Atlanta Braves	1
4	Houston Astros	3

League Championship Series (FOX)
1	Chicago White Sox	4
2	Los Angeles Angels of Anaheim	1
1	St. Louis Cardinals	2
4	Houston Astros	4

World Series (FOX)
AL1	Chicago White Sox	4
NL4	Houston Astros	0

Note: Major League Baseball's playoff format automatically seeds the Wild Card team 4th. Normally, the No. 1 seed plays the No. 4 seed in the Division Series. However, MLB does not allow the No. 1 seed to play the 4th seed/Wild Card winner in the Division Series if they are from the same division, instead having the No. 1 seed play the next lowest seed, the No. 3 seed.

== Farm system ==
Level	Team	League	Manager
AAA	Salt Lake Stingers	Pacific Coast League	Dino Ebel
AA	Arkansas Travelers	Texas League	Tom Gamboa
A	Rancho Cucamonga Quakes	California League	Tyrone Boykin
A	Cedar Rapids Kernels	Midwest League	Bobby Magallanes
Rookie	AZL Angels	Arizona League	Brian Harper
Rookie	Orem Owlz	Pioneer League	Tom Kotchman

Records
Preceded by 2004	Los Angeles Angels seasons 2005	Succeeded by 2006
