= 2005 Oakland Athletics season =

2005 Oakland Athletics
- League: American League
- Division: West
- Ballpark: McAfee Coliseum
- City: Oakland, California
- Record: 88–74 (.543)
- Divisional place: 2nd
- Owners: Lewis Wolff
- General managers: Billy Beane
- Managers: Ken Macha
- Television: KICU-TV; FSN Bay Area (Ray Fosse, Tim Roye, Hank Greenwald, Glen Kuiper)
- Radio: KFRC (Bill King, Ken Korach); KZSF (Fernando Arias, Julio Gonzalez)

The Oakland Athletics' 2005 season was their 37th in Oakland, California. It was also the 105th season in franchise history. The team finished second in the American League West with a record of 88–74.

The Athletics entered the 2005 season with low expectations. The team had won more than 90 games in each of the previous five seasons; despite this, there were concerns about the team's starting pitching. During the 2004–05 offseason, general manager Billy Beane traded two of the team's so-called "Big Three" starting pitchers. Beane traded two of the three, Tim Hudson and Mark Mulder, to the Atlanta Braves and St. Louis Cardinals (respectively); in both instances, he received prospects in return. The A's retained All-Star starter Barry Zito; despite this, many worried about the quality of the team's remaining starters. Some even picked the Athletics to finish last in the American League West, despite their having finished second (one game behind the Anaheim Angels) just months prior.

The A's seemed to validate these concerns in the early days of the 2005 season. On May 29, they were 17–32 (the third-worst record in baseball at the time); moreover, the team trailed the division-leading Angels by 12.5 games. The Athletics would follow this poor start with a stunning turnaround. From May 30 to August 13, Oakland would go a league-best 50–17. The surge was brought about, in large part, by the strong pitching of young starters Dan Haren (received in the Mulder trade), Rich Harden, and Joe Blanton. The team stunningly erased their 12.5 game deficit over this span. Oakland would pace the Angels well into September; at their peak, on August 30, the A's actually led the Angels by two games. In the end, though, the team fell short; a collapse in the second half of the 2005 season, combined with a dramatic Angels surge, saw the Athletics finish seven games out of first place.

The 2005 season also saw Athletics closer Huston Street win the American League Rookie of the Year Award. Street earned the honor after posting a 1.72 earned run average in his first major-league season; he did so while recording 23 saves. The Rookie of the Year Award was Oakland's second in as many years (and sixth overall).

== Offseason ==
- November 27, 2004: Jason Kendall was traded by the Pittsburgh Pirates with cash to the Oakland Athletics for Mark Redman, Arthur Rhodes, and cash.
- December 16, 2004: Tim Hudson was traded by the Oakland Athletics to the Atlanta Braves for Juan Cruz, Dan Meyer, and Charles Thomas.
- December 18, 2004: Dan Haren was traded by the St. Louis Cardinals with Daric Barton and Kiko Calero to the Oakland Athletics for Mark Mulder.

== Regular season ==
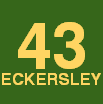
Dennis
Eckersley
Pitcher:
1987-95(OAK)

Retired 2005

=== Season standings ===
AL West
Team	W	L	Pct.	GB	Home	Road
Los Angeles Angels of Anaheim	95	67	.586	—	49‍–‍32	46‍–‍35
Oakland Athletics	88	74	.543	7	45‍–‍36	43‍–‍38
Texas Rangers	79	83	.488	16	44‍–‍37	35‍–‍46
Seattle Mariners	69	93	.426	26	39‍–‍42	30‍–‍51

=== Record vs. opponents ===
2005 American League record Source: MLB Standings Grid – 2005
Team	BAL	BOS	CWS	CLE	DET	KC	LAA	MIN	NYY	OAK	SEA	TB	TEX	TOR	NL
Baltimore	—	8–10	2–6	1–6	3–5	4–2	2–4	3–3	7–11	4–6	7–3	12–6	4–6	9–10	8–10
Boston	10–8	—	4–3	4–2	6–4	4–2	6–4	4–2	9–10	6–4	3–3	13–6	7–2	7–11	12–6
Chicago	6–2	3–4	—	14–5	14–5	13–5	4–6	11–7	3–3	2–7	6–3	4–2	3–6	4–2	12–6
Cleveland	6–1	2–4	5–14	—	12–6	13–6	3–5	10–9	3–4	6–3	7–3	4–6	3–3	4–2	15–3
Detroit	5–3	4–6	5–14	6–12	—	10–9	4–6	8–11	1–5	1–5	5–4	5–2	4–2	4–3	9–9
Kansas City	2–4	2–4	5–13	6–13	9–10	—	2–7	6–13	3–3	2–4	2–7	3–5	2–8	3–6	9–9
Los Angeles	4–2	4–6	6–4	5–3	6–4	7–2	—	6–4	6–4	10–9	9–9	4–5	15–4	1–5	12–6
Minnesota	3–3	2–4	7–11	9–10	11–8	13–6	4–6	—	3–3	4–6	6–4	6–0	3–6	4–2	8–10
New York	11–7	10–9	3–3	4–3	5–1	3–3	4–6	3–3	—	7–2	7–3	8–11	7–3	12–6	11–7
Oakland	6–4	4–6	7–2	3–6	5–1	4–2	9–10	6–4	2–7	—	12–6	4–5	11–8	5–5	10–8
Seattle	3–7	3–3	3–6	3–7	4–5	7–2	9–9	4–6	3–7	6–12	—	4–2	6–13	4–6	10–8
Tampa Bay	6–12	6–13	2–4	6–4	2–5	5–3	5–4	0–6	11–8	5–4	2–4	—	6–2	8–11	3–15
Texas	6–4	2–7	6–3	3–3	2–4	8–2	4–15	6–3	3–7	8–11	13–6	2–6	—	7–3	9–9
Toronto	10–9	11–7	2–4	2–4	3–4	6–3	5–1	2–4	6–12	5–5	6–4	11–8	3–7	—	8–10

=== Transactions ===
- July 13, 2005: Eric Byrnes was traded by the Oakland Athletics with Omar Quintanilla to the Colorado Rockies for Joe Kennedy and Jay Witasick.

=== Roster ===
2005 Oakland Athletics
Roster
Pitchers: 55 Joe Blanton; 50 Kiko Calero; 46 Santiago Casilla; 51 Juan Cruz; 29 Octavio Dotel; 58 Justin Duchscherer; 30 Seth Etherton; 40 Ron Flores; 56 Ryan Glynn; 40 Rich Harden; 24 Dan Haren; 49 Tim Harikkala; 37 Joe Kennedy; 57 Britt Reames; 73 Ricardo Rincón; 31 Kirk Saarloos; 20 Huston Street; 45 Jay Witasick; 13 Keiichi Yabu; 75 Barry Zito	Catchers: 22 Alberto Castillo; 18 Jason Kendall; 17 Adam Melhuse; Infielders: 49 Freddie Bynum; 3 Eric Chavez; 4 Jermaine Clark; 7 Bobby Crosby; 44 Erubiel Durazo; 14 Mark Ellis; 6 Keith Ginter; 10 Scott Hatteberg; 11 Dan Johnson; 19 Marco Scutaro	Outfielders: 29 Hiram Bocachica; 22 Eric Byrnes; 23 Bobby Kielty; 21 Mark Kotsay; 16 Jay Payton; 33 Nick Swisher; 26 Charles Thomas; 12 Matt Watson	Manager: 39 Ken Macha; Coaches: 35 Brad Fischer (first base); 52 Bob Geren (bullpen); 48 Dave Hudgens (hitting); 15 Rene Lachemann (bench); 38 Ron Washington (third base); 41 Curt Young (pitching)

== Player stats ==
=== Batting ===
Note: Pos = Position; G = Games played; AB = At bats; H = Hits; Avg. = Batting average; HR = Home runs; RBI = Runs batted in

Pos	Player	G	AB	H	Avg.	HR	RBI
C	Jason Kendall	150	601	163	.271	0	53
1B	Dan Johnson	109	375	103	.275	15	58
2B	Mark Ellis	122	434	137	.316	13	52
SS	Bobby Crosby	84	333	92	.276	9	38
3B	Eric Chavez	160	625	168	.269	27	101
LF	Bobby Kielty	116	377	99	.263	10	57
CF	Mark Kotsay	139	582	163	.280	15	82
RF	Nick Swisher	131	462	109	.236	21	74
DH	Scott Hatteberg	134	464	119	.256	7	59

==== Other batters ====
Note: G = Games played; AB = At bats; H = Hits; Avg. = Batting average; HR = Home runs; RBI = Runs batted in

Player	G	AB	H	Avg.	HR	RBI
Marco Scutaro	118	381	94	.247	9	37
Jay Payton	69	275	74	.269	13	42
Eric Byrnes	59	192	51	.266	7	24
Erubiel Durazo	41	152	36	.237	4	16
Keith Ginter	51	137	22	.161	3	25
Adam Melhuse	39	97	24	.247	2	12
Matt Watson	19	48	9	.188	0	5
Charles Thomas	30	46	5	.109	0	1
Hiram Bocachica	9	19	2	.105	0	0
Freddie Bynum	7	7	2	.286	0	1
Alberto Castillo	1	1	0	.000	0	0
Jermaine Clark	4	0	0	----	0	0

=== Starting pitchers ===
Note: G = Games pitched; IP = Innings pitched; W = Wins; L = Losses ERA = Earned run average; SO = Strikeouts

Player	G	IP	W	L	ERA	SO
Barry Zito	35	228.1	14	13	3.86	171
Dan Haren	34	217.0	14	12	3.73	163
Joe Blanton	33	201.1	12	12	3.53	116
Kirk Saarloos	29	159.2	10	9	4.17	53
Rich Harden	22	128.0	10	5	2.53	121
Seth Etherton	3	17.2	1	1	6.62	10

==== Other pitchers ====
Note: G = Games pitched; IP = Innings pitched; W = Wins; L = Losses; ERA = Earned run average; SO = Strikeouts

Player	G	IP	W	L	ERA	SO
Joe Kennedy	19	60.2	4	5	4.45	45
Ryan Glynn	5	17.0	0	4	6.88	15

===== Relief pitchers =====
Note: G = Games pitched; W = Wins; L = Losses; SV = Saves; ERA = Earned run average; SO = Strikeouts

Player	G	W	L	SV	ERA	SO
Huston Street	67	5	1	23	1.72	72
Ricardo Rincón	67	1	1	0	4.34	27
Justin Duchscherer	65	7	4	5	2.21	85
Kiko Calero	58	4	1	1	3.23	52
Keiichi Yabu	40	4	0	1	4.50	44
Juan Cruz	28	0	3	0	7.44	34
Jay Witasick	28	1	1	1	3.25	33
Octavio Dotel	15	1	2	7	3.52	16
Ron Flores	11	0	0	0	1.04	6
Tim Harikkala	8	0	0	0	6.39	7
Santiago Casilla	3	0	0	0	3.00	1
Britt Reames	2	0	0	0	9.53	4

== Farm system ==
Level	Team	League	Manager
AAA	Sacramento River Cats	Pacific Coast League	Tony DeFrancesco
AA	Midland RockHounds	Texas League	Von Hayes
A	Stockton Ports	California League	Todd Steverson
A	Kane County Cougars	Midwest League	Dave Joppie
A-Short Season	Vancouver Canadians	Northwest League	Juan Navarrette
Rookie	AZL Athletics	Arizona League	Ruben Escalera

LEAGUE CHAMPIONS: Midland
