= Freddie Bynum =

American baseball player (born 1980)

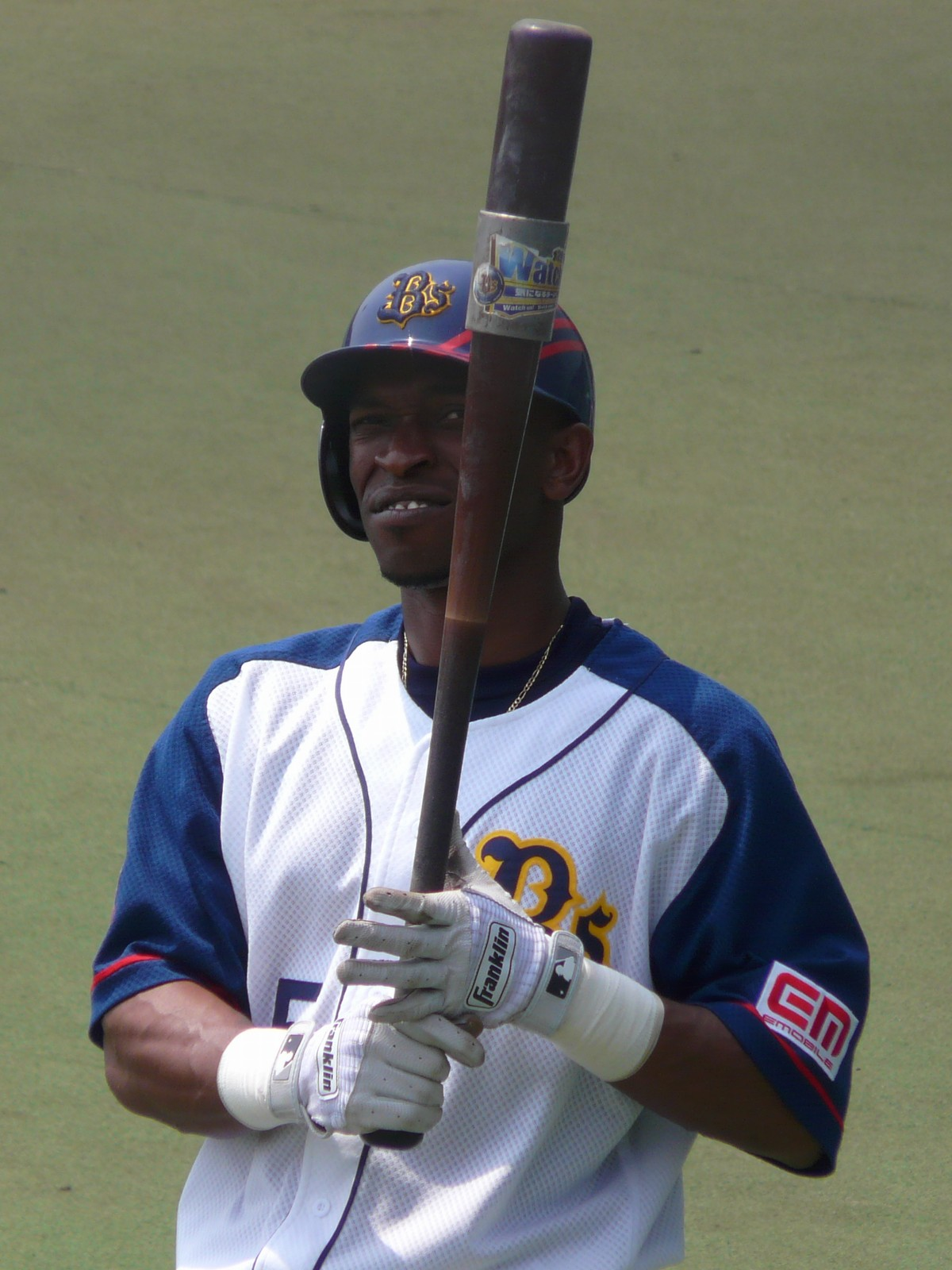
- Bynum with the Orix Buffaloes
- Shortstop / Outfielder
- Born: March 15, 1980 (age 45); Wilson, North Carolina, U.S.
- Batted: Left Threw: Right

Professional debut
- MLB: August 30, 2005, for the Oakland Athletics
- NPB: March 31, 2010, for the Orix Buffaloes

Last appearance
- MLB: July 17, 2008, for the Baltimore Orioles
- NPB: October 1, 2010, for the Orix Buffaloes

MLB statistics
- Batting average: .234
- Home runs: 6
- Runs batted in: 32

NPB statistics
- Batting average: .138
- Home runs: 0
- Runs batted in: 1
- Stats at Baseball Reference

Teams
- Oakland Athletics (2005); Chicago Cubs (2006); Baltimore Orioles (2007–2008); Orix Buffaloes (2010)

Freddie Lee Bynum Jr. (born March 15, 1980) is an American former professional baseball shortstop and outfielder. He played in Major League Baseball (MLB) for the Chicago Cubs, Oakland Athletics, and Baltimore Orioles. Bynum also played in Nippon Professional Baseball (NPB) for Orix Buffaloes.

== Career ==
=== Oakland Athletics ===
Bynum was selected by the Oakland Athletics in the second round (60th overall) of the 2000 MLB draft. He made his major league debut with the A's on August 30, 2005, where he entered the game as a pinch runner in the tenth inning before moving to left field. Bynum played in seven games with Oakland in 2005, batting .286 with an RBI.

=== Chicago Cubs ===
On March 31, 2006, the Chicago Cubs acquired Bynum from the A's in a three-way deal. The Cubs traded pitcher John Koronka to the Texas Rangers, while the Rangers sent pitcher Juan Dominguez to the A's to complete the deal.

=== Baltimore Orioles ===
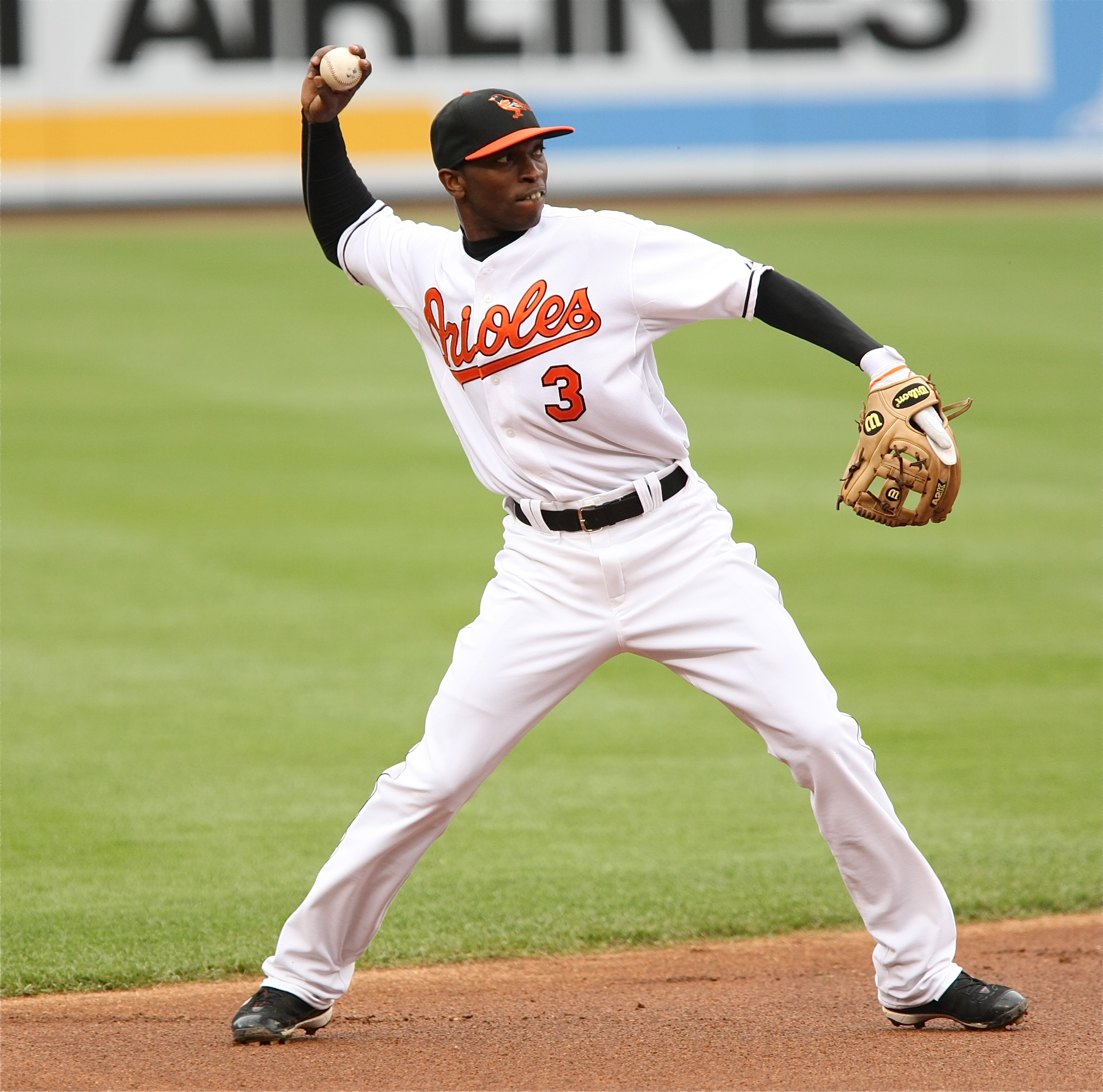
Bynum with the Baltimore Orioles in 2008

On December 6, 2006, Bynum was dealt to the Baltimore Orioles for a player to be named later, who became Kevin Hart. He was designated for assignment by the Orioles on June 22, 2008, and was sent outright to the minors a few days later. However, he was recalled by the Orioles on July 1. He was sent outright to the minors once again on July 19.

=== Washington Nationals ===
On December 13, 2008, Bynum signed a minor league contract with the Washington Nationals and received an invitation to spring training.

=== Chicago White Sox ===
Bynum signed a minor league contract with the Chicago White Sox on December 13, 2009, but was released early on in Spring Training.

=== Orix Buffaloes ===
Upon his release from the White Sox, Bynum was signed by the Orix Buffaloes of Nippon Professional Baseball on February 27, 2010.

=== St. Louis Cardinals ===
On January 19, 2011, Bynum signed a minor league contract with the St. Louis Cardinals.

=== Somerset Patriots ===
On April 26, 2012, Bynum signed with the Somerset Patriots of the Atlantic League of Professional Baseball. He became a free agent after the season.
