= Juan Domínguez (baseball) =

Dominican baseball player (born 1980)

- Pitcher
- Born: May 18, 1980 (age 46); Sánchez Ramírez, Dominican Republic
- Batted: Right Threw: Right

MLB debut
- August 12, 2003, for the Texas Rangers

Last MLB appearance
- October 1, 2005, for the Texas Rangers

MLB statistics
- Win–loss record: 5–10
- Earned run average: 4.60
- Strikeouts: 72
- Stats at Baseball Reference

Teams
- Texas Rangers (2003–2005)

Juan Domínguez (born May 18, 1980) is a Dominican former professional baseball pitcher. He played in Major League Baseball (MLB) for the Texas Rangers.

== Career ==
Over three seasons, the right-hander appeared in 32 games for the Rangers, 17 of them as a starter, compiling an ERA of 4.60. In the 2005–06 offseason, Domínguez was dealt by Texas to the Oakland Athletics for pitcher John Rheinecker and infielder Freddie Bynum. Domínguez started the 2006 with Oakland's Triple-A squad, the Sacramento River Cats, but suffered a season-ending ankle injury in July. The Athletics released Domínguez after the end of the 2006 season.
