= Ryan Drese =

American baseball player (born 1976)

- Pitcher
- Born: April 5, 1976 (age 50); San Francisco, California, U.S.
- Batted: Right Threw: Right

MLB debut
- June 29, 2001, for the Cleveland Indians

Last MLB appearance
- April 14, 2006, for the Washington Nationals

MLB statistics
- Win–loss record: 34–39
- Earned run average: 5.31
- Strikeouts: 301
- Stats at Baseball Reference

Teams
- Cleveland Indians (2001–2002); Texas Rangers (2003–2005); Washington Nationals (2005–2006)
Medals
Men's baseball
Representing United States
World Junior Baseball Championship
Silver medal – second place	1994 Brandon	Team

Ryan Thomas Drese (born April 5, 1976) is an American former professional baseball pitcher.

== Career ==
He is a graduate of the University of California Berkeley and Bishop O'Dowd High School in Oakland, California.

During a 6-year major league baseball career, Drese pitched from 2001 to 2006 for the Cleveland Indians, Texas Rangers, and Washington Nationals. He was very effective for the Rangers as a starter in 2004, winning 14 games. In his last start of the season, he surrendered Ichiro Suzuki's 258th base hit of the year, the one which broke George Sisler's longstanding record. In 2005, Drese was, somewhat surprisingly, placed on waivers after a slow start. This followed shortly after a mid-game, dugout scuffle between Drese and catcher Rod Barajas (apparently sparked by Barajas being unprofessional and assaulting Drese regarding pitch selection).

Drese spent most of the 2006 season on the disabled list. He was released by the Nationals on October 3, 2006. He signed a minor league contract with the Atlanta Braves on August 3, 2007, and was assigned to the Myrtle Beach Pelicans, but he was released in March 2008.

Drese signed with the Camden Riversharks of the Atlantic League on April 24, 2008. On June 27, he signed a minor league deal with the Pittsburgh Pirates and became a free agent at the end of the season. He re-signed with the Riversharks for the 2009 season and played with the Long Island Ducks in 2010.

On February 3, 2011, Drese signed a minor league deal with the Baltimore Orioles with an invite to spring training. He signed a minor league contract with the Houston Astros on May 27, after he was released by the Orioles.

== See also ==
- List of Texas Rangers Opening Day starting pitchers
