= Seth McClung =

American baseball player (born 1981)

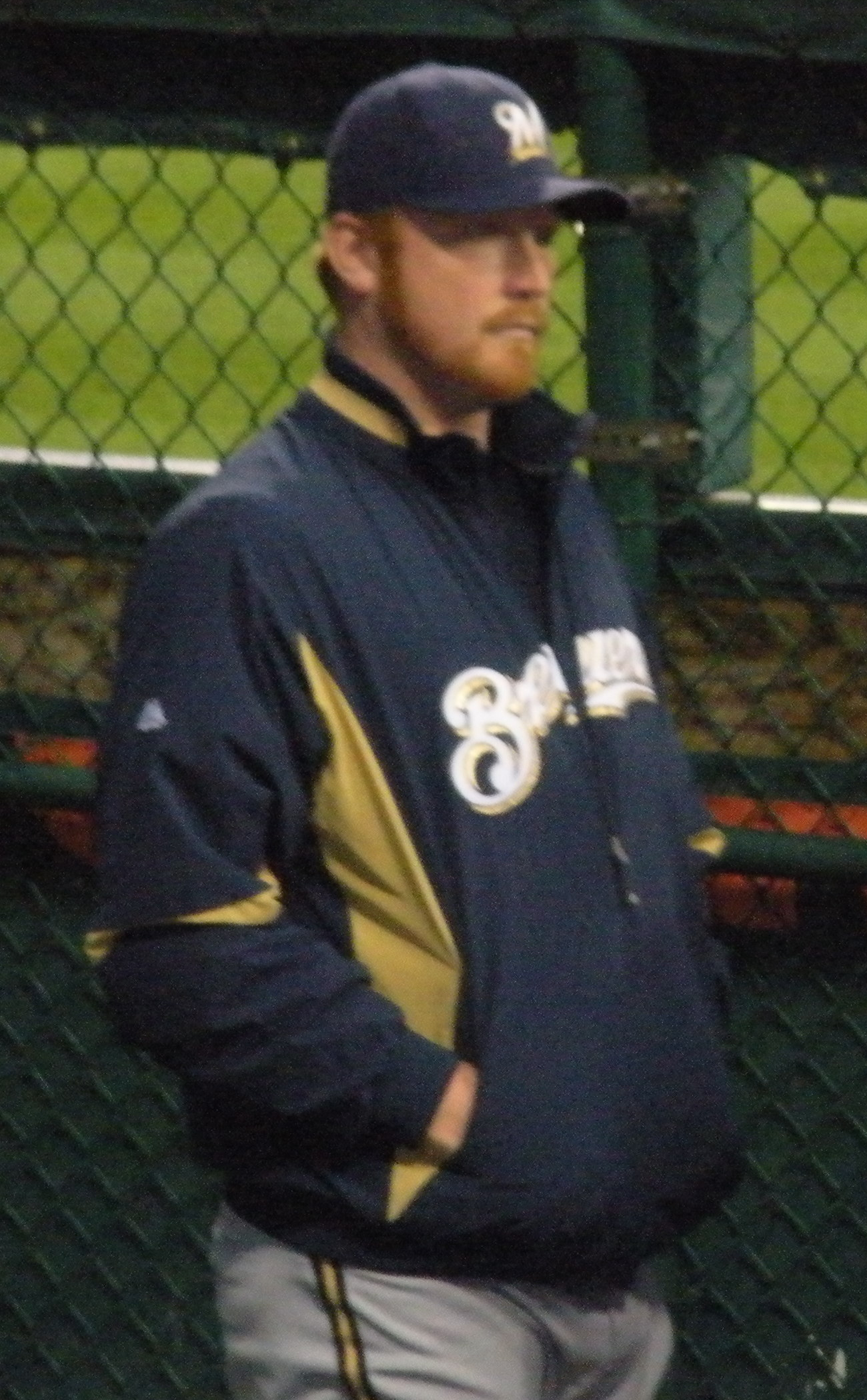
- McClung with the Milwaukee Brewers in 2009
- Pitcher
- Born: February 7, 1981 (age 45); Lewisburg, West Virginia, U.S.
- Batted: Left Threw: Right

Professional debut
- MLB: March 31, 2003, for the Tampa Bay Devil Rays
- CPBL: May 25, 2013, for the Uni-President Lions

Last appearance
- MLB: October 4, 2009, for the Milwaukee Brewers
- CPBL: June 15, 2013, for the Uni-President Lions

MLB statistics
- Win–loss record: 26–34
- Earned run average: 5.46
- Strikeouts: 314

CPBL statistics
- Win–loss record: 1–2
- Earned run average: 4.09
- Strikeouts: 19
- Stats at Baseball Reference

Teams
- Tampa Bay Devil Rays (2003, 2005–2006); Milwaukee Brewers (2007–2009); Uni-President Lions (2013)

Michael Seth McClung (born February 7, 1981), nicknamed "Big Red", is an American former professional baseball pitcher. In his career, he pitched as a starting pitcher and as a relief pitcher. He played in Major League Baseball (MLB) for the Tampa Bay Devil Rays and Milwaukee Brewers, and in the Chinese Professional Baseball League (CPBL) for the Uni-President Lions.

== Career ==
=== Tampa Bay Devil Rays ===
McClung began the 2006 season with the Tampa Bay Devil Rays as a starting pitcher, was sent later that year to the minor leagues, and was converted to be a closer.

=== Milwaukee Brewers ===
He started the 2007 season in Triple-A Durham of the International League, before being traded to the Milwaukee Brewers for Grant Balfour on July 27. He was then assigned to the Nashville Sounds of the Pacific Coast League before being called up to Milwaukee on August 21, making his debut with the Brewers in a relief appearance on the same day.

He began the 2008 season in the Brewers bullpen, later being moved into the rotation in place of Carlos Villanueva. His first appearance as a starter for Milwaukee was against the Washington Nationals on May 24. After the Brewers traded for CC Sabathia, McClung and Dave Bush shared a spot in the rotation with Bush pitching on the road and McClung pitching at home. This experiment ended on August 2, with Bush taking the rotation spot and McClung moving to the bullpen. He became a free agent following the 2009 season.

=== Florida Marlins ===
On February 1, 2010, McClung signed a minor league contract with the Florida Marlins with an invite to spring training. He was released on March 30.

=== Texas Rangers ===
On December 18, 2010, McClung signed a minor league contract with the Texas Rangers. He was released on July 13, 2011.

=== Milwaukee Brewers (second stint) ===
On January 10, 2012, McClung signed a minor league deal with the Brewers. On July 29, McClung was released. He went 2–13 with a 6.36 ERA in 21 appearances (20 starts) with Triple-A Nashville.

=== Chicago Cubs ===
On August 13, 2012, McClung signed a minor league contract with the Chicago Cubs. In 4 appearances (3 starts) for the Triple-A Iowa Cubs, he struggled to a 1–2 record and 6.32 ERA with 16 strikeouts across 15 2/3 innings pitched. McClung elected free agency following the season on November 2.

=== Sultanes de Monterrey ===
On March 21, 2013, McClung signed with the Sultanes de Monterrey of the Mexican League. In 13 appearances for Monterrey, he recorded a 1.69 ERA with 15 strikeouts and five saves across 10 2/3 innings pitched. McClung was released by the Sultanes on April 26.

=== Uni-President Lions ===
On May 20, 2013, McClung signed with the Uni-President Lions of the Chinese Professional Baseball League. He was released on June 16.

=== Pericos de Puebla ===
On July 6, 2013, McClung signed with the Pericos de Puebla of the Mexican League. In 11 appearances for Puebla, he posted a 1–1 record and 2.92 ERA with 9 strikeouts across 12 1/3 innings pitched. McClung was released by the Pericos on November 18.

=== Pittsburgh Pirates ===
On November 20, 2013, McClung signed a minor league contract with the Pittsburgh Pirates. He was released on March 19, 2014.

== Personal life ==
McClung is the uncle of professional basketball player Mac McClung. Mac grew up going to games and spending time with his big league uncle, surrounding himself with high levels of success at a young age. Seth could be attributed to inspiring the younger McClung as he encouraged Mac to achieve greatness and for his "younger generation of the family to pass [his] accomplishments". Currently, he is the head baseball coach at Tarpon Springs High School.
