= 2005 Minnesota Twins season =

2005 Minnesota Twins
- League: American League
- Division: Central
- Ballpark: Hubert H. Humphrey Metrodome
- City: Minneapolis
- Record: 83–79 (.512)
- Divisional place: 3rd
- Owners: Carl Pohlad
- General managers: Terry Ryan
- Managers: Ron Gardenhire
- Television: WFTC; FSN North (Bert Blyleven, Dick Bremer)
- Radio: 830 WCCO AM (Herb Carneal, John Gordon, Dan Gladden)

The 2005 Minnesota Twins Season was the franchise's 45th season playing in the Twin Cities and the 105th season in its history. The team was managed by Ron Gardenhire in his fourth year as the Twins' manager. They played their home games in the Metrodome.

The Twins' final record was 83–79. They finished third in the American League Central, behind the Chicago White Sox and the Cleveland Indians, and they missed the playoffs for the first time since 2001.

== Regular season ==
The Twins got off to an average start. However, the Chicago White Sox had a fantastic start to the season. The Twins tried to stay close in the standings, but their offense was insufficient. The Twins (83–79) finished in 3rd place behind the Chicago White Sox and the Cleveland Indians, and missed the playoffs for the first time since 2001. The White Sox went on to earn the division title, their first trip to the playoffs since 2000, and their first World Series title since 1917.

=== Standings ===
AL Central
Team	W	L	Pct.	GB	Home	Road
Chicago White Sox	99	63	.611	—	47‍–‍34	52‍–‍29
Cleveland Indians	93	69	.574	6	43‍–‍38	50‍–‍31
Minnesota Twins	83	79	.512	16	45‍–‍36	38‍–‍43
Detroit Tigers	71	91	.438	28	39‍–‍42	32‍–‍49
Kansas City Royals	56	106	.346	43	34‍–‍47	22‍–‍59

=== Record vs. opponents ===
2005 American League record Source: MLB Standings Grid – 2005
Team	BAL	BOS	CWS	CLE	DET	KC	LAA	MIN	NYY	OAK	SEA	TB	TEX	TOR	NL
Baltimore	—	8–10	2–6	1–6	3–5	4–2	2–4	3–3	7–11	4–6	7–3	12–6	4–6	9–10	8–10
Boston	10–8	—	4–3	4–2	6–4	4–2	6–4	4–2	9–10	6–4	3–3	13–6	7–2	7–11	12–6
Chicago	6–2	3–4	—	14–5	14–5	13–5	4–6	11–7	3–3	2–7	6–3	4–2	3–6	4–2	12–6
Cleveland	6–1	2–4	5–14	—	12–6	13–6	3–5	10–9	3–4	6–3	7–3	4–6	3–3	4–2	15–3
Detroit	5–3	4–6	5–14	6–12	—	10–9	4–6	8–11	1–5	1–5	5–4	5–2	4–2	4–3	9–9
Kansas City	2–4	2–4	5–13	6–13	9–10	—	2–7	6–13	3–3	2–4	2–7	3–5	2–8	3–6	9–9
Los Angeles	4–2	4–6	6–4	5–3	6–4	7–2	—	6–4	6–4	10–9	9–9	4–5	15–4	1–5	12–6
Minnesota	3–3	2–4	7–11	9–10	11–8	13–6	4–6	—	3–3	4–6	6–4	6–0	3–6	4–2	8–10
New York	11–7	10–9	3–3	4–3	5–1	3–3	4–6	3–3	—	7–2	7–3	8–11	7–3	12–6	11–7
Oakland	6–4	4–6	7–2	3–6	5–1	4–2	9–10	6–4	2–7	—	12–6	4–5	11–8	5–5	10–8
Seattle	3–7	3–3	3–6	3–7	4–5	7–2	9–9	4–6	3–7	6–12	—	4–2	6–13	4–6	10–8
Tampa Bay	6–12	6–13	2–4	6–4	2–5	5–3	5–4	0–6	11–8	5–4	2–4	—	6–2	8–11	3–15
Texas	6–4	2–7	6–3	3–3	2–4	8–2	4–15	6–3	3–7	8–11	13–6	2–6	—	7–3	9–9
Toronto	10–9	11–7	2–4	2–4	3–4	6–3	5–1	2–4	6–12	5–5	6–4	11–8	3–7	—	8–10

=== Roster ===
2005 Minnesota Twins
Roster
Pitchers: 30 Scott Baker; 56 Travis Bowyer; 28 Jesse Crain; 59 Dave Gassner; 54 Matt Guerrier; 47 Francisco Liriano; 49 Kyle Lohse; 25 Joe Mays; 45 Terry Mulholland; 36 Joe Nathan; 22 Brad Radke; 39 Juan Rincón; 33 J. C. Romero; 57 Johan Santana; 52 Carlos Silva	Catchers: 41 Chris Heintz; 7 Joe Mauer; 51 Corky Miller; 55 Mike Redmond; Infielders: 15 Brent Abernathy; 18 Jason Bartlett; 21 Bret Boone; 17 Juan Castro; 5 Michael Cuddyer; 24 Matthew LeCroy; 27 Justin Morneau; 8 Nick Punto; 2 Luis Rivas; 38 Luis Rodríguez; 32 Terry Tiffee; 16 Glenn Williams	Outfielders: 20 Lew Ford; 48 Torii Hunter; 11 Jacque Jones; 12 Michael Ryan; 23 Shannon Stewart; 21 Jason Tyner	Manager: 35 Ron Gardenhire; Coaches: 40 Rick Anderson (pitching); 62 Al Newman (third base); 9 Steve Liddle (bench); 43 Rick Stelmaszek (bullpen); 46 Scott Ullger (hitting); 13 Jerry White (first base)

== Offense ==
Australian-born infielder Glenn Williams played in thirteen games for his "cup of coffee" in the major leagues between June 7 to June 28. He hit safely in every game, establishing a franchise record for the longest hitting streak to start a major league career. Over his 40 at-bats, he accumulated 17 hits and finished with a .425 batting average. A shoulder injury ended his major league stint and sent him back to the minor leagues for rehab. Although he never returned to the majors, he retired with a career hitting streak intact across all 13 of his appearances.

Joe Mauer led the team with a .294 batting average, Justin Morneau led the team in runs batted in with 79, but Mauer hit only 9 home runs and 55 RBI, while Morneau hit only .239.

These problems were endemic to the team. No starter batted over .300 or hit over 25 home runs; however, Matthew LeCroy managed to hit 17 home runs in part-time duty.

The team's offensive struggles led to an uncertain lineup, with many defensive positions lacking regular starters. The team experimented by bringing in Seattle Mariners infielder Bret Boone to fill the void at second base, but he lasted for only 53 at-bats, hitting .170. The weak hitting led to hitting coach Scott Ullger being reassigned to third base coach after the season was over.

Team Leaders
Statistic	Player	Quantity
HR	Jacque Jones	23
RBI	Justin Morneau	79
Avg.	Joe Mauer	.294
Runs	Jacque Jones	74

== Pitching ==
Twins pitchers performed well in 2005. The staff was led by All-Star Johan Santana (16–7, 2.87 ERA, 238 strikeouts) and All-Star closer Joe Nathan (43 saves, 2.70 ERA). However, the weak hitting prevented any other starter from winning ten games. (Jesse Crain, in a stellar year out of the bullpen, did go 12–5.) The anemic offense also may have cost Santana a second Cy Young Award, as he finished with only sixteen victories.

The top end of the rotation—Santana, Brad Radke, Kyle Lohse, and Carlos Silva—pitched well. Many bullpen pitchers had outstanding years, in particular Crain, Juan Rincón (2.45 ERA), J. C. Romero (3.47), and Matt Guerrier (3.39).

Silva in particular had what seemed to be a breakout year, walking only nine batters during the entire season to set a modern-era record (over 188.1 innings, a 0.43 rate). Silva induced 34 double plays to lead the majors, and won a May 20 game throwing just 74 pitches over nine innings. No pitcher has thrown as few pitches in a nine-inning win since 1957.

In early May, the pitching staff was shaken when Major League Baseball announced that Juan Rincón would be suspended for ten days for violating the sport's policy on performance-enhancing drugs. Rincón pitched well both before and after this occurred.

Team Leaders
Statistic	Player	Quantity
ERA	Johan Santana	2.87
Wins	Johan Santana	16
Saves	Joe Nathan	43
Strikeouts	Johan Santana	238

== Defense ==
Like his predecessor Tom Kelly, Gardenhire emphasized baseball fundamentals like defense. Despite Hunter's injury, he still won a Gold Glove in center field. Joe Mauer established a reputation as an outstanding defensive catcher, with a .993 fielding percentage. Morneau, not known for his defense, surprised many with a .994 average at first. Luis Rivas was a solid defensive second baseman, but his offensive shortcomings became too much to bear, leading the team to experiment with Boone and Nick Punto at the position. In contrast to Rivas, Michael Cuddyer saw a majority of the time at third base. Jason Bartlett and Juan Castro split time at shortstop, with Castro being the superior defensive player. Shannon Stewart and Jacque Jones both had .985 fielding percentages in the corner outfield positions. Lew Ford saw time at all three outfield positions.

== Player stats ==
=== Batting ===
Note: G = Games played; AB = At bats; R = Runs; H = Hits; 2B = Doubles; 3B = Triples; HR = Home runs; RBI = Runs batted in; SB = Stolen bases; BB = Walks; AVG = Batting average; SLG = Slugging average

Player	G	AB	R	H	2B	3B	HR	RBI	SB	BB	AVG	SLG
Shannon Stewart	132	551	69	151	27	3	10	56	7	34	.274	.388
Jacque Jones	142	523	74	130	22	4	23	73	13	51	.249	.438
Lew Ford	147	522	70	138	30	4	7	53	13	45	.264	.377
Justin Morneau	141	490	62	117	23	4	22	79	0	44	.239	.437
Joe Mauer	131	489	61	144	26	2	9	55	13	61	.294	.411
Michael Cuddyer	126	422	55	111	25	3	12	42	3	41	.263	.422
Nick Punto	112	394	45	94	18	4	4	26	13	36	.239	.335
Torii Hunter	98	372	63	100	24	1	14	56	23	34	.269	.452
Matt LeCroy	101	304	33	79	5	0	17	50	0	41	.260	.444
Juan Castro	97	272	27	70	18	1	5	33	0	9	.257	.386
Jason Bartlett	74	224	33	54	10	1	3	16	4	21	.241	.335
Luis Rodríguez	79	175	21	47	10	2	2	20	2	18	.269	.383
Terry Tiffee	54	150	9	31	8	1	1	15	1	8	.207	.293
Mike Redmond	45	148	17	46	9	0	1	26	0	6	.311	.392
Luis Rivas	59	136	21	35	3	1	1	12	4	9	.257	.316
Michael Ryan	57	117	7	27	5	0	2	13	1	9	.231	.325
Brent Abernathy	24	67	5	16	1	0	1	6	2	7	.239	.299
Jason Tyner	18	56	8	18	1	1	0	5	2	4	.321	.375
Bret Boone	14	53	3	9	0	0	0	3	0	4	.170	.170
Glenn Williams	13	40	3	17	1	0	0	3	1	2	.425	.450
Chris Heintz	8	25	1	5	3	0	0	2	0	1	.200	.320
Corky Miller	5	12	0	0	0	0	0	0	0	0	.000	.000
Pitcher totals	162	22	1	2	0	0	0	0	0	0	.091	.091
Team totals	162	5564	688	1441	269	32	134	644	102	485	.259	.391

=== Pitching ===
Note: W = Wins; L = Losses; ERA = Earned run average; G = Games pitched; GS = Games started; SV = Saves; IP = Innings pitched; H = Hits allowed; R = Runs allowed; ER = Earned runs allowed; BB = Walks allowed; SO = Strikeouts

Player	W	L	ERA	G	GS	SV	IP	H	R	ER	BB	SO
Johan Santana	16	7	2.87	33	33	0	231.1	180	77	74	45	238
Brad Radke	9	12	4.04	31	31	0	200.2	214	98	90	23	117
Carlos Silva	9	8	3.44	27	27	0	188.1	212	83	72	9	71
Kyle Lohse	9	13	4.18	31	30	0	178.2	211	85	83	44	186
Joe Mays	6	10	5.65	31	26	0	156.0	203	109	98	41	59
Jesse Crain	12	5	2.71	75	0	1	79.2	61	28	24	29	125
Juan Rincón	6	6	2.45	75	0	0	77.0	63	26	21	30	84
Matt Guerrier	0	3	3.39	43	0	0	71.2	71	29	27	24	46
Joe Nathan	7	4	2.70	69	0	43	70.0	46	22	21	22	94
Terry Mulholland	0	2	4.27	49	0	0	59.0	61	30	28	17	18
J.C. Romero	4	3	3.47	68	0	0	57.0	50	26	22	39	48
Scott Baker	3	3	3.35	10	9	0	53.2	48	21	20	14	32
Francisco Liriano	1	2	5.70	6	4	0	23.2	19	15	15	7	33
Travis Bowyer	0	1	5.59	8	0	0	9.2	10	6	6	3	12
Dave Gassner	1	0	5.87	2	2	0	7.2	9	7	5	1	2
Team totals	83	79	3.71	162	162	44	1464.1	1458	662	604	348	965

== Notable transactions ==
- January 3: Signed Brent Abernathy as a free agent.
- January 24: Former first-round pick Adam Johnson released.
- March 31: Lost Michael Restovich to the Tampa Bay Devil Rays on waivers.
- June 7: Drafted pitcher Matt Garza with the 25th pick in the first round of the 2005 Amateur Draft. Garza would make his debut the following year.
- July 11: Received Bret Boone from the Seattle Mariners for future consideration. Boone would hit .170 and was released on July 31.
- October 3: Former all-star pitcher Joe Mays and Augie Ojeda granted free agency.
- October 11: Matthew LeCroy, Glenn Williams, and Jason Tyner granted free agency. Tyner would re-sign with the Twins four days later. Williams would be re-signed on November 23.
- October 12: Brent Abernathy and Luis Rivas granted free agency.
- October 27: Terry Mulholland granted free agency.
- October 28: Outfielder Jacque Jones granted free agency.
- December 2: Traded Travis Bowyer and Scott Tyler to the Florida Marlins for second baseman Luis Castillo.
- December 9: Traded pitcher J. C. Romero to the Los Angeles Angels for infielder Alexi Casilla, who would make his debut next September.
- December 15: Signed Tony Batista as a free agent.
- December 21: Grant Balfour granted free agency.
- December 22: Rondell White signed as a free agent.
- December 23: Mike Smith signed as a free agent.
- December 27: Dennys Reyes signed as a free agent.

== Miscellaneous ==
Twins 40th Anniversary of 1965 World Series.

- On May 15, pitcher Brad Radke walked Texas' Mark Teixeira, after a streak of 191 consecutive batters who hadn't earned a walk off Radke.
- Johan Santana finished in third in the voting for the Cy Young Award behind Mariano Rivera and the winner, Bartolo Colón.
- In 2005, the Twins celebrated the 40th anniversary of their AL pennant win in 1965.
- The representatives of the Twins in the All-Star Game were closer Joe Nathan and Johan Santana.
- Frank Viola and Carl Pohlad were inducted into the Twins Hall of Fame.
- The Twins wore the uniforms of the 1909 St. Paul Colored Gophers during a Turn Back the Clock game on July 10, 2005, in Kansas City against the Royals.

== Other post-season awards ==
- Calvin R. Griffith Award (Most Valuable Twin) – Johan Santana
- Joseph W. Haynes Award (Twins Pitcher of the Year) – Johan Santana
- Bill Boni Award (Twins Outstanding Rookie) – Jesse Crain
- Charles O. Johnson Award (Most Improved Twin) – Carlos Silva
- Dick Siebert Award (Upper Midwest Player of the Year) – Travis Hafner
- Bob Allison Award (Leadership Award) – Mike Redmond
  - The above awards are voted on by the Twin Cities chapter of the BBWAA
- Carl R. Pohlad Award (Outstanding Community Service) – Ron Gardenhire
- Sherry Robertson Award (Twins Outstanding Farm System Position Player) – David Winfree
- Jim Rantz Award (Twins Outstanding Farm System Pitcher) – Francisco Liriano

== Farm system ==
Level	Team	League	Manager
AAA	Rochester Red Wings	International League	Phil Roof and Rich Miller
AA	New Britain Rock Cats	Eastern League	Stan Cliburn
A	Fort Myers Miracle	Florida State League	Riccardo Ingram
A	Beloit Snappers	Midwest League	Kevin Boles
Rookie	Elizabethton Twins	Appalachian League	Ray Smith
Rookie	GCL Twins	Gulf Coast League	Nelson Prada

LEAGUE CHAMPIONS: Elizabethton
