= 2005 Seattle Mariners season =

2005 Seattle Mariners
- League: American League
- Division: West
- Ballpark: Safeco Field
- City: Seattle, Washington
- Record: 69–93 (.426)
- Divisional place: 4th
- Owners: Nintendo of America (represented by Howard Lincoln)
- General managers: Bill Bavasi
- Managers: Mike Hargrove
- Television: KSTW 11; FSN Northwest
- Radio: KOMO 710 AM(Dave Niehaus, Rick Rizzs, Ron Fairly, Dave Valle, Dave Henderson, Jay Buhner)

The 2005 Seattle Mariners season was the 29th season in franchise history, and their second consecutive season finishing at the bottom of the American League West, finishing with a record of 69–93 (.426). They only had one player represented at the 2005 All-Star Game, who was Ichiro Suzuki with his fifth selection for the All-Star Game.

Over the course of the disappointing season, the Mariners managed to have their longest winning streak over the course of a four-game series with the Angels (July 7–10), while having two losing streaks of seven between April 30–8 May / June 25 – July 2.

== Offseason ==
- December 17, 2004: Adrián Beltré was signed as a free agent with the Seattle Mariners.

== Regular season ==
=== Opening Day starters ===
- Adrián Beltré
- Bret Boone
- Raúl Ibañez
- Jamie Moyer
- Miguel Olivo
- Jeremy Reed
- Richie Sexson
- Ichiro Suzuki
- Wilson Valdez
- Randy Winn

=== Season standings ===
AL West
Team	W	L	Pct.	GB	Home	Road
Los Angeles Angels of Anaheim	95	67	.586	—	49‍–‍32	46‍–‍35
Oakland Athletics	88	74	.543	7	45‍–‍36	43‍–‍38
Texas Rangers	79	83	.488	16	44‍–‍37	35‍–‍46
Seattle Mariners	69	93	.426	26	39‍–‍42	30‍–‍51

=== Record vs. opponents ===
2005 American League record Source: MLB Standings Grid – 2005
Team	BAL	BOS	CWS	CLE	DET	KC	LAA	MIN	NYY	OAK	SEA	TB	TEX	TOR	NL
Baltimore	—	8–10	2–6	1–6	3–5	4–2	2–4	3–3	7–11	4–6	7–3	12–6	4–6	9–10	8–10
Boston	10–8	—	4–3	4–2	6–4	4–2	6–4	4–2	9–10	6–4	3–3	13–6	7–2	7–11	12–6
Chicago	6–2	3–4	—	14–5	14–5	13–5	4–6	11–7	3–3	2–7	6–3	4–2	3–6	4–2	12–6
Cleveland	6–1	2–4	5–14	—	12–6	13–6	3–5	10–9	3–4	6–3	7–3	4–6	3–3	4–2	15–3
Detroit	5–3	4–6	5–14	6–12	—	10–9	4–6	8–11	1–5	1–5	5–4	5–2	4–2	4–3	9–9
Kansas City	2–4	2–4	5–13	6–13	9–10	—	2–7	6–13	3–3	2–4	2–7	3–5	2–8	3–6	9–9
Los Angeles	4–2	4–6	6–4	5–3	6–4	7–2	—	6–4	6–4	10–9	9–9	4–5	15–4	1–5	12–6
Minnesota	3–3	2–4	7–11	9–10	11–8	13–6	4–6	—	3–3	4–6	6–4	6–0	3–6	4–2	8–10
New York	11–7	10–9	3–3	4–3	5–1	3–3	4–6	3–3	—	7–2	7–3	8–11	7–3	12–6	11–7
Oakland	6–4	4–6	7–2	3–6	5–1	4–2	9–10	6–4	2–7	—	12–6	4–5	11–8	5–5	10–8
Seattle	3–7	3–3	3–6	3–7	4–5	7–2	9–9	4–6	3–7	6–12	—	4–2	6–13	4–6	10–8
Tampa Bay	6–12	6–13	2–4	6–4	2–5	5–3	5–4	0–6	11–8	5–4	2–4	—	6–2	8–11	3–15
Texas	6–4	2–7	6–3	3–3	2–4	8–2	4–15	6–3	3–7	8–11	13–6	2–6	—	7–3	9–9
Toronto	10–9	11–7	2–4	2–4	3–4	6–3	5–1	2–4	6–12	5–5	6–4	11–8	3–7	—	8–10

=== Transactions ===
- June 7, 2005: Jeff Clement was drafted by the Seattle Mariners in the 1st round (3rd pick) of the 2005 amateur draft. Player signed July 26, 2005.
- July 11, 2005: Bret Boone was sent to the Minnesota Twins by the Seattle Mariners as part of a conditional deal.
- July 30, 2005: Yorvit Torrealba was traded by the San Francisco Giants with Jesse Foppert to the Seattle Mariners for Randy Winn.
- August 19, 2005: Scott Spiezio was released by the Seattle Mariners.

=== Roster ===
2005 Seattle Mariners
Roster
Pitchers: 57 Scott Atchison; 32,49 Jorge Campillo; 45 Ryan Franklin; 18 Eddie Guardado; 58 Jeff Harris; 17 Shigetoshi Hasegawa; 59 Félix Hernández; 35 Masao Kida; 56 Bobby Madritsch; 40 Julio Mateo; 55 Gil Meche; 50 Jamie Moyer; 37 Clint Nageotte; 38 Joel Piñeiro; 20 J. J. Putz; 30 Aaron Sele; 52 George Sherrill; 39 Rafael Soriano; 53 Matt Thornton; 47 Ron Villone	Catchers: 37 Pat Borders; 31 Wiki González; 35,2 Miguel Ojeda; 8 Miguel Olivo; 59,30 René Rivera; 8 Yorvit Torrealba; 6 Dan Wilson; Infielders: 5 Adrián Beltré; 46 Yuniesky Betancourt; 16 Willie Bloomquist; 29 Bret Boone; 22 Greg Dobbs; 10 Dave Hansen; 4 José López; 46,12 Mike Morse; 1 Ramón Santiago; 44 Richie Sexson; 23 Scott Spiezio; 12 Wilson Valdéz	Outfielders: 62 Jaime Bubela; 54 Shin-Soo Choo; 28 Raúl Ibañez; 7 Jeremy Reed; 32 Chris Snelling; 36 Jamal Strong; 51 Ichiro Suzuki; 2 Randy Winn	Manager: 21 Mike Hargrove; Coaches: 15 Don Baylor (hitting); 13 Carlos García (first base); 9 Ron Hassey (bench); 5 Jeff Newman (third base); 34 Bryan Price (pitching); 41 Jim Slaton (bullpen)

== Game log ==
2005 game log
April

#	Date	Opponent	Score	Win	Loss	Save	Attendance	Record
1	April 4	Twins	5–1	Moyer (1–0)	Radke (0–1)		46,249	1–0
2	April 5	Twins	8–4	Santana (1–0)	Thornton (0–1)		28,373	1–1
3	April 6	Twins	4–1	Silva (1–0)	Madritsch (0–1)	Nathan (1)	25,580	1–2
4	April 8	Rangers	9–6	Putz (1–0)	Regilio (0–1)	Guardado (1)	29,652	2–2
5	April 9	Rangers	7–6	Brocail (1–0)	Guardado (0–1)	Cordero (1)	31,501	2–3
6	April 10	Rangers	7–6	Riley (1–0)	Thornton (0–2)	Cordero (2)	30,434	2–4
7	April 11	@ Royals	8–2	Franklin (1–0)	Hernández (1–1)		41,788	3–4
8	April 13	@ Royals	2–1	Sele (1–0)	Cerda (0–1)	Guardado (2)	10,577	4–4
9	April 14	@ Royals	10–2	Moyer (2–0)	Bautista (1–1)		10,212	5–4
10	April 15	@ White Sox	6–4	Garland (2–0)	Piñeiro (0–1)	Hermanson (2)	16,749	5–5
11	April 16	@ White Sox	2–1	Buehrle (2–1)	Franklin (1–1)		25,931	5–6
12	April 17	@ White Sox	5–4	Meche (1–0)	García (1–1)	Guardado (3)	23,324	6–6
13	April 18	@ Angels	6–1	Byrd (1–2)	Sele (1–1)		39,638	6–7
14	April 19	@ Angels	5–3	Moyer (3–0)	Gregg (1–1)	Guardado (4)	38,667	7–7
15	April 20	Athletics	7–6	Piñeiro (1–1)	Street (1–1)	Guardado (5)	24,841	8–7
16	April 21	Athletics	3–0	Harden (2–0)	Franklin (1–2)	Dotel (3)	22,428	8–8
17	April 22	Indians	6–1	Sabathia (1–0)	Meche (1–1)		43,207	8–9
18	April 23	Indians	5–2	Lee (2–0)	Sele (1–2)	Wickman (5)	33,564	8–10
19	April 24	Indians	9–1	Moyer (4–0)	Elarton (0–1)		32,889	9–10
20	April 26	@ Rangers	7–4	Piñeiro (2–1)	Drese (2–2)	Guardado (6)	23,064	10–10
21	April 27	@ Rangers	8–2	Rogers (1–2)	Franklin (1–3)		26,308	10–11
22	April 28	@ Rangers	4–1	Meche (2–1)	Young (2–2)	Guardado (7)	23,928	11–11
23	April 29	@ Athletics	4–2	Sele (2–2)	Haren (1–3)	Guardado (8)	18,545	12–11
24	April 30	@ Athletics	6–5	Yabu (2–0)	Villone (0–1)		23,288	12–12

May

#	Date	Opponent	Score	Win	Loss	Save	Attendance	Record
25	May 1	@ Athletics	3–2	Zito (1–4)	Piñeiro (2–2)	Dotel (6)	30,634	12–13
26	May 2	Anaheim	5–0	Washburn (2–0)	Franklin (1–4)		24,184	12–14
27	May 3	Anaheim	5–2	Lackey (3–1)	Meche (2–2)	Shields (2)	29,917	12–15
28	May 4	Anaheim	5–2	Byrd (2–3)	Sele (2–3)	Rodríguez (7)	26,303	12–16
29	May 6	@ Red Sox	7–2	Clement (4–0)	Moyer (4–1)		35,229	12–17
–	May 7	@ Red Sox	Postponed, rescheduled for 8 May					12–17
30	May 8	@ Red Sox	6–3	González (1–0)	Piñeiro (2–3)	Foulke (8)	34,848	12–18
31	May 8	@ Red Sox	6–4	Franklin (2–4)	Halama (1–1)	Guardado (9)	34,671	13–18
32	May 9	@ Yankees	4–3	Johnson (3–2)	Nelson (0–1)	Rivera (4)	38,079	13–19
33	May 10	@ Yankees	7–4	Wang (1–1)	Sele (2–4)	Rivera (5)	39,780	13–20
34	May 11	@ Yankees	13–9	Quantrill (1–0)	Thornton (0–3)		47,844	13–21
35	May 13	Red Sox	14–7	Mateo (1–0)	González (1–1)		44,534	14–21
36	May 14	Red Sox	6–3	Myers (1–0)	Villone (0–2)	Foulke (9)	46,229	14–22
37	May 15	Red Sox	5–4	Meche (3–2)	Wakefield (4–2)	Guardado (10)	46,145	15–22
38	May 16	Yankees	6–3	Wang (2–1)	Hasegawa (0–1)	Rivera (7)	37,814	15–23
39	May 17	Yankees	6–0	Pavano (3–2)	Mateo (1–1)		35,549	15–24
40	May 18	Yankees	7–6	Nelson (1–1)	Gordon (0–3)	Villone (1)	37,419	16–24
41	May 20	Padres	6–1	Peavy (4–0)	Franklin (2–5)		38,400	16–25
42	May 21	Padres	5–3	Meche (4–2)	Lawrence (2–5)	Guardado (11)	37,286	17–25
43	May 22	Padres	5–0	Sele (3–4)	Stauffer (1–1)		41,017	18–25
44	May 24	@ Orioles	3–2	Williams (4–3)	Putz (1–1)	Ryan (13)	19,839	18–26
45	May 25	@ Orioles	3–1	López (3–2)	Moyer (4–2)	Ryan (14)	18,820	18–27
46	May 26	@ Orioles	5–2	Cabrera (4–3)	Franklin (2–6)		22,166	18–28
47	May 27	@ Devil Rays	5–4	Hendrickson (2–2)	Meche (4–3)	Báez (7)	10,130	18–29
48	May 28	@ Devil Rays	3–2	Sele (4–4)	Fossum (2–3)	Guardado (12)	13,281	19–29
49	May 29	@ Devil Rays	10–9	Villone (1–2)	McClung (0–2)	Guardado (13)	13,851	20–29
50	May 30	Blue Jays	4–3	Moyer (5–2)	Lilly (3–5)	Guardado (14)	25,540	21–29
51	May 31	Blue Jays	9–7	Gaudin (1–0)	Franklin (2–7)	Batista (9)	25,737	21–30

June

#	Date	Opponent	Score	Win	Loss	Save	Attendance	Record
52	June 1	Blue Jays	3–0	Meche (5–3)	Chacín (5–4)	Guardado (15)	24,815	22–30
53	June 3	Devil Rays	6–1	Waechter (2–3)	Sele (4–5)		35,344	22–31
54	June 4	Devil Rays	6–5	Mateo (2–1)	Báez (4–1)	Guardado (16)	32,742	23–31
55	June 5	Devil Rays	6–5	Villone (2–2)	Orvella (0–1)		40,004	24–31
56	June 7	@ Marlins	4–3	Hasegawa (1–1)	Mecir (1–1)	Guardado (17)	20,519	25–31
57	June 8	@ Marlins	5–4	Willis (10–2)	Meche (5–4)	Jones (10)	19,313	25–31
58	June 9	@ Marlins	8–0	Sele (5–5)	Beckett (7–4)		16,069	26–32
59	June 10	@ Nationals	9–3	Ayala (6–3)	Hasegawa (1–2)		28,704	26–33
60	June 11	@ Nationals	2–1	Patterson (3–1)	Putz (1–2)	Cordero (18)	39,108	26–34
61	June 12	@ Nationals	3–2	Armas (3–3)	Franklin (2–8)	Cordero (19)	37,170	26–35
62	June 14	Phillies	3–1	Meche (6–4)	Lieber (8–5)	Guardado (18)	26,818	27–35
63	June 15	Phillies	5–1	Sele (6–5)	Padilla (3–6)		26,019	28–35
64	June 16	Phillies	3–2	Geary (1–0)	Mateo (2–2)	Wagner (18)	27,162	28–36
65	June 17	Mets	5–0	Moyer (6–2)	Ishii (1–6)	Nelson (1)	37,443	29–36
66	June 18	Mets	4–1	Franklin (3–8)	Martínez (7–2)	Guardado (19)	45,841	30–36
67	June 19	Mets	11–5	Meche (7–4)	Glavine (4–7)		45,785	31–36
68	June 20	Athletics	6–2	Haren (5–7)	Villone (2–3)		27,263	31–37
69	June 21	Athletics	4–2	Harden (3–3)	Piñeiro (2–4)	Duchscherer (3)	31,673	31–38
70	June 22	Athletics	5–4	Guardado (1–1)	Glynn (0–4)		28,829	32–38
71	June 23	Athletics	5–0	Saarloos (4–4)	Franklin (3–9)		37,549	32–39
72	June 24	@ Padres	14–5	Meche (8–4)	May (1–2)		35,942	33–39
73	June 25	@ Padres	8–5	Peavy (7–2)	Sele (6–6)	Hoffman (20)	33,926	33–40
74	June 26	@ Padres	5–4	Seánez (4–0)	Mateo (2–3)	Hoffman (21)	39,098	33–41
75	June 28	@ Athletics	8–1	Zito (4–8)	Moyer (6–3)		14,384	33–42
76	June 29	@ Athletics	6–2	Blanton (5–6)	Franklin (3–10)		25,177	33–43
77	June 30	@ Athletics	6–2	Haren (7–7)	Meche (8–5)		19,583	33–44

July

#	Date	Opponent	Score	Win	Loss	Save	Attendance	Record
78	July 1	Rangers	6–2	Park (8–2)	Sele (6–7)		37,270	33–45
79	July 2	Rangers	6–5	Loe (2–1)	Putz (1–3)	Cordero (19)	34,209	33–46
80	July 3	Rangers	2–1	Moyer (7–3)	Rogers (9–4)	Guardado (20)	34,397	34–46
81	July 4	@ Royals	6–0	Franklin (4–10)	Howell (1–3)		23,562	35–46
82	July 5	@ Royals	8–6	Carrasco (4–3)	Meche (8–6)	MacDougal (10)	10,658	35–47
83	July 6	@ Royals	5–1	Hernández (6–9)	Sele (6–8)	MacDougal (11)	12,206	35–48
84	July 7	@ Angels	10–2	Piñeiro (3–4)	Colon (11–5)		43,747	36–48
85	July 8	@ Angels	10–4	Moyer (8–3)	Washburn (5–4)		43,853	37–48
86	July 9	@ Angels	6–3	Franklin (5–10)	Lackey (6–4)		44,012	38–48
87	July 10	@ Angels	7–4	Meche (9–6)	Santana (3–4)	Guardado (21)	41,657	39–48
88	July 14	Orioles	5–3	Cabrera (8–7)	Sele (6–9)	Ryan (20)	36,316	39–49
89	July 15	Orioles	6–3	López (9–5)	Piñeiro (3–5)	Ryan (21)	39,044	39–50
90	July 16	Orioles	3–2	Putz (2–3)	Ray (0–1)		39,282	40–50
91	July 17	Orioles	8–2	Meche (10–6)	Ponson (7–8)		41,215	41–50
92	July 19	@ Blue Jays	12–10	Lilly (8–9)	Sele (6–10)	Batista (16)	20,516	41–51
93	July 20	@ Blue Jays	9–4	Chacín (9–5)	Franklin (5–11)		28,801	41–52
94	July 21	@ Blue Jays	6–3	Towers (7–8)	Piñeiro (3–6)	Batista (17)	26,837	41–53
95	July 22	@ Indians	4–3	Putz (3–3)	Elarton (6–5)	Guardado (22)	27,208	42–53
96	July 23	@ Indians	4–3	Lee (11–4)	Meche (10–7)	Wickman (24)	28,498	42–54
97	July 24	@ Indians	6–3	Millwood (4–9)	Sele (6–11)		22,863	42–55
98	July 25	Tigers	5–3	Putz (4–3)	Robertson (5–8)	Guardado (23)	27,102	43–55
99	July 26	Tigers	8–5	Johnson (7–8)	Mateo (2–4)	Farnsworth (6)	30,644	43–56
100	July 27	Tigers	9–3	Moyer (9–3)	Maroth (8–11)		29,323	44–56
101	July 28	Indians	6–5	Howry (6–2)	Putz (4–4)	Wickman (26)	28,500	44–57
102	July 29	Indians	10–5	Millwood (5–9)	Sele (6–12)		32,966	44–58
103	July 30	Indians	3–2	Franklin (6–11)	Sabathia (6–9)	Guardado (24)	37,719	45–58
104	July 31	Indians	9–7	Westbrook (9–12)	Piñeiro (3–7)	Wickman (27)	33,652	45–59

August

#	Date	Opponent	Score	Win	Loss	Save	Attendance	Record
105	August 2	@ Tigers	4–1	Mateo (3–4)	Johnson (7–9)	Guardado (25)	30,306	46–59
106	August 3	@ Tigers	10–7	Maroth (9–11)	Meche (10–8)	Rodney (1)	26,760	46–60
107	August 4	@ Tigers	3–1	Douglass (4–1)	Hernández (0–1)	Rodney (2)	28,148	46–61
108	August 5	@ White Sox	4–2	Piñeiro (4–7)	García (11–5)	Guardado (26)	39,165	47–61
109	August 6	@ White Sox	4–2	Buehrle (13–4)	Moyer (9–4)	Hermanson (27)	37,529	47–62
110	August 7	@ White Sox	3–1	Garland (16–5)	Harris (0–1)	Hermanson (28)	35,706	47–63
111	August 8	Twins	5–4	Sherrill (1–0)	Silva (7–6)	Guardado (27)	35,401	48–63
112	August 9	Twins	1–0	Hernández (1–1)	Lohse (7–11)	Guardado (28)	34,213	49–63
113	August 10	Twins	7–3	Nathan (5–3)	Nelson (1–2)		35,801	49–64
114	August 12	Angels	9–4	Donnelly (7–3)	Putz (4–5)		37,585	49–65
115	August 13	Angels	9–1	Colon (15–6)	Franklin (6–12)		42,500	49–66
116	August 14	Angels	7–6	Donnelly (8–3)	Sherrill (1–1)	Rodríguez (27)	38,468	49–67
117	August 15	Royals	11–3	Hernández (2–1)	Hernández (8–11)		31,908	50–67
118	August 16	Royals	4–3	Piñeiro (5–7)	Affeldt (0–2)	Guardado (29)	31,425	51–67
119	August 17	Royals	11–5	Moyer (10–4)	Carrasco (5–7)		35,224	52–67
120	August 18	@ Twins	7–3	Mays (6–8)	Franklin (6–13)		22,230	52–68
121	August 19	@ Twins	7–4	Silva (8–6)	Sherrill (1–2)	Nathan (31)	24,795	52–69
122	August 20	@ Twins	8–3	Sherrill (2–2)	Guerrier (0–2)		33,334	53–69
123	August 21	@ Twins	8–3	Radke (8–10)	Piñeiro (5–8)		33,405	53–70
124	August 23	@ Rangers	6–4	Young (11–7)	Moyer (10–5)	Cordero (28)	25,653	53–71
125	August 24	@ Rangers	8–1	Domínguez (1–3)	Franklin (6–14)	Wasdin (2)	28,612	53–72
126	August 25	@ Rangers	8–2	Harris (1–1)	Benoit (3–4)		19,112	54–72
127	August 26	White Sox	5–3	Vizcaíno (6–5)	Nelson (1–3)	Hermanson (32)	40,431	54–73
128	August 27	White Sox	4–3	Contreras (9–7)	Piñeiro (5–9)	Marte (4)	37,326	54–74
129	August 28	White Sox	9–2	Moyer (11–5)	García (11–7)		36,838	55–75
130	August 29	Yankees	7–4	Small (5–0)	Thornton (0–4)	Rivera (34)	41,731	55–75
131	August 30	Yankees	8–3	Harris (2–1)	Chacón (3–2)		37,773	56–75
132	August 31	Yankees	2–0	Johnson (13–8)	Hernández (2–2)	Rivera (35)	46,240	56–76

September

#	Date	Opponent	Score	Win	Loss	Save	Attendance	Record
133	September 1	Yankees	5–1	Sherrill (3–2)	Sturtze (4–3)		39,986	57–76
134	September 2	@ Angels	4–1	Byrd (10–9)	Moyer (11–6)	Rodríguez (33)	42,604	57–77
135	September 3	@ Angels	6–3	Putz (5–5)	Shields (8–10)		43,819	58–77
136	September 4	@ Angels	5–3	Colon (18–6)	Harris (2–2)	Rodríguez (34)	43,757	58–78
137	September 5	@ Athletics	2–0	Hernández (3–2)	Blanton (8–11)	Guardado (30)	22,262	59–78
138	September 6	@ Athletics	3–2	Piñeiro (6–9)	Kennedy (3–2)	Guardado (31)	24,012	60–78
139	September 7	@ Athletics	8–7	Street (5–1)	Guardado (1–2)		14,609	60–79
140	September 9	Orioles	3–2	Moyer (12–6)	Bédard (6–7)	Putz (1)	27,429	61–79
141	September 10	Orioles	5–3	López (14–9)	Harris (2–3)	Ryan (30)	30,408	61–80
142	September 11	Orioles	6–3	Chen (12–9)	Hernández (3–3)	Ryan (31)	30,212	61–81
143	September 12	Angels	8–1	Piñeiro (7–9)	Santana (8–8)		27,952	62–81
144	September 13	Angels	2–1	Putz (6–5)	Byrd (11–10)		28,813	63–81
145	September 14	Angels	10–9	Guardado (2–2)	Rodríguez (2–5)		23,397	64–81
146	September 15	@ Rangers	4–3	Loe (9–5)	Harris (2–4)	Cordero (32)	23,679	64–82
147	September 16	@ Rangers	5–3	Rupe (1–0)	Hernández (3–4)	Cordero (33)	25,567	64–83
148	September 17	@ Rangers	7–6	Shouse (3–2)	Guardado (2–3)		41,983	64–84
149	September 18	@ Rangers	8–6	Dickey (1–1)	Franklin (6–15)	Cordero (34)	26,532	64–85
150	September 19	@ Blue Jays	7–5	Sherrill (4–2)	Batista (5–7)	Guardado (32)	18,762	65–85
151	September 20	@ Blue Jays	6–4	Towers (12–11)	Harris (2–5)	Frasor (1)	19,002	65–86
152	September 21	@ Blue Jays	3–2	Hernández (4–4)	Bush (5–10)	Guardado (33)	21,469	66–86
153	September 22	@ Blue Jays	7–5	Speier (3–2)	Piñeiro (7–10)	Batista (29)	23,118	66–87
154	September 23	@ Tigers	2–1	Franklin (7–15)	Spurling (3–4)	Guardado (34)	23,972	67–87
155	September 24	@ Tigers	7–1	Grilli (1–0)	Moyer (12–7)		25,328	67–88
156	September 25	@ Tigers	8–1	Maroth (14–13)	Hasegawa (1–3)		26,128	67–89
157	September 27	Rangers	3–2	Wasdin (3–2)	Mateo (3–5)	Cordero (36)	22,739	67–90
158	September 28	Rangers	7–3	Young (12–7)	Piñeiro (7–11)	Cordero (37)	20,723	67–91
159	September 29	Rangers	4–3	Franklin (8–15)	Rogers (14–8)	Guardado (35)	19,481	68–91
160	September 30	Athletics	4–1	Moyer (13–7)	Saarloos (10–9)	Guardado (36)	34,809	69–91

October

#	Date	Opponent	Score	Win	Loss	Save	Attendance	Record
161	October 1	Athletics	4–3	Blanton (12–12)	Mateo (3–6)	Street (23)	26,998	69–92
162	October 2	Athletics	8–3	Kennedy (4–5)	Sherrill (4–3)		35,300	69–93

== Player stats ==
=== Batting ===
==== Starters by position ====
Note: Pos = Position; G = Games played; AB = At bats; H = Hits; Avg. = Batting average; HR = Home runs; RBI = Runs batted in

Player	Pos	G	AB	H	Avg.	HR	RBI
Miguel Olivo	C	54	152	23	.151	5	18
Richie Sexson	1B	156	558	147	.263	39	121
Bret Boone	2B	74	273	63	.231	7	34
Yuniesky Betancourt	SS	60	211	54	.256	1	15
Adrián Beltré	3B	156	603	154	.255	19	87
Randy Winn	LF	102	386	106	.275	6	37
Jeremy Reed	CF	141	488	124	.254	3	45
Ichiro Suzuki	RF	162	679	206	.303	15	68
Raúl Ibañez	DH	162	614	172	.280	20	89

=== Other batters ===
Note: G = Games played; AB = At bats; H = Hits; Avg. = Batting average; HR = Home runs; RBI = Runs batted in

Player	G	AB	H	Avg.	HR	RBI
Willie Bloomquist	82	249	64	.257	0	22
Michael Morse	72	230	64	.278	3	23
José López	54	190	47	.247	2	25
Greg Dobbs	59	142	35	.246	1	20
Wilson Valdez	42	126	25	.198	0	8
Pat Borders	39	117	23	.197	1	7
Yorvit Torrealba	42	108	26	.241	2	8
Dave Hansen	60	75	13	.173	2	11
René Rivera	16	48	19	.396	1	6
Scott Spiezio	29	47	3	.064	1	1
Wiki González	14	45	12	.267	0	2
Miguel Ojeda	16	29	5	.172	1	3
Chris Snelling	15	29	8	.276	1	1
Dan Wilson	11	27	5	.185	0	2
Jamal Strong	16	20	5	.250	0	2
Jaime Bubela	11	19	2	.105	0	0
Shin-Soo Choo	10	18	1	.056	0	1
Ramón Santiago	8	8	1	.125	0	0

=== Pitching ===
==== Starting and other pitchers ====
Note: G = Games pitched; IP = Innings pitched; W = Wins; L = Losses; ERA = Earned run average; SO = Strikeouts

Player	G	IP	W	L	ERA	SO
Jorge Campillo	2	2.0	0	0	0.00	1
Félix Hernández	12	84.1	4	4	2.67	77
Jeff Harris	11	53.2	2	5	4.19	25
Jamie Moyer	32	200.0	13	7	4.28	102
Ryan Franklin	30	186.2	8	15	5.16	93
Gil Meche	26	139.2	10	8	5.22	80
Joel Piñeiro	30	189.0	7	11	5.62	107
Aaron Sele	21	116.0	6	12	5.66	53
Bobby Madritsch	1	4.1	0	1	6.23	1

==== Relief pitchers ====
Note: G = Games pitched; IP = Innings pitched; W = Wins; L = Losses; H = Holds; SV = Saves; ERA = Earned run average; SO = Strikeouts

Player	G	IP	W	L	H	SV	ERA	SO
Ron Villone	52	40.1	2	3	17	1	2.45	41
Rafael Soriano	7	7.1	0	0	1	0	2.45	9
Eddie Guardado	58	56.1	2	0	0	36	2.72	48
Julio Mateo	55	88.1	3	6	8	0	3.06	52
J. J. Putz	64	60.0	6	5	21	1	3.60	45
Jeff Nelson	49	36.2	1	3	9	1	3.93	34
Shigetoshi Hasegawa	46	66.2	1	3	3	0	4.19	30
Masao Kida	1	2.0	0	0	0	0	4.50	0
Matt Thornton	55	57.0	0	4	5	0	5.21	57
George Sherrill	29	19.0	4	3	9	0	5.21	24
Scott Atchison	6	6.2	0	0	0	0	6.75	9
Clint Nageotte	3	4.0	0	0	0	0	6.75	1

=== Team statistics ===
Positions in brackets are in league with other MLB teams

==== Batting ====
Note: G = Games played; AB = At bats; H = Hits; R = Runs; Avg. = Batting average; HR = Home runs; RBI = Runs batted in

Team	G	AB	H	R	Avg.	HR	RBI
Mariners	162	5507 (20th)	1408 (27th)	699 (22nd)	.256 (26th)	130 (25th)	657 (22nd)
Opponents	162	5529	1483	751	.268	179	729

==== Pitching ====
Note: G = Games pitched; W = Wins; L = Losses; ERA = Earned run average; SO = Strikeouts; SHO = Shutouts

Team	G	IP	W	L	ERA	SO	SHO
Mariners	162	1427.2 (26th)	69 (26th)	93 (5th)	4.49 (20th)	892 (30th)	7 (22nd)

== Farm system ==
Level	Team	League	Manager
AAA	Tacoma Rainiers	Pacific Coast League	Dan Rohn
AA	San Antonio Missions	Texas League	Dave Brundage
A	Inland Empire 66ers	California League	Daren Brown
A	Wisconsin Timber Rattlers	Midwest League	Scott Steinmann
A-Short Season	Everett AquaSox	Northwest League	Pedro Grifol
Rookie	AZL Mariners	Arizona League	Dana Williams

== Major League Baseball draft ==
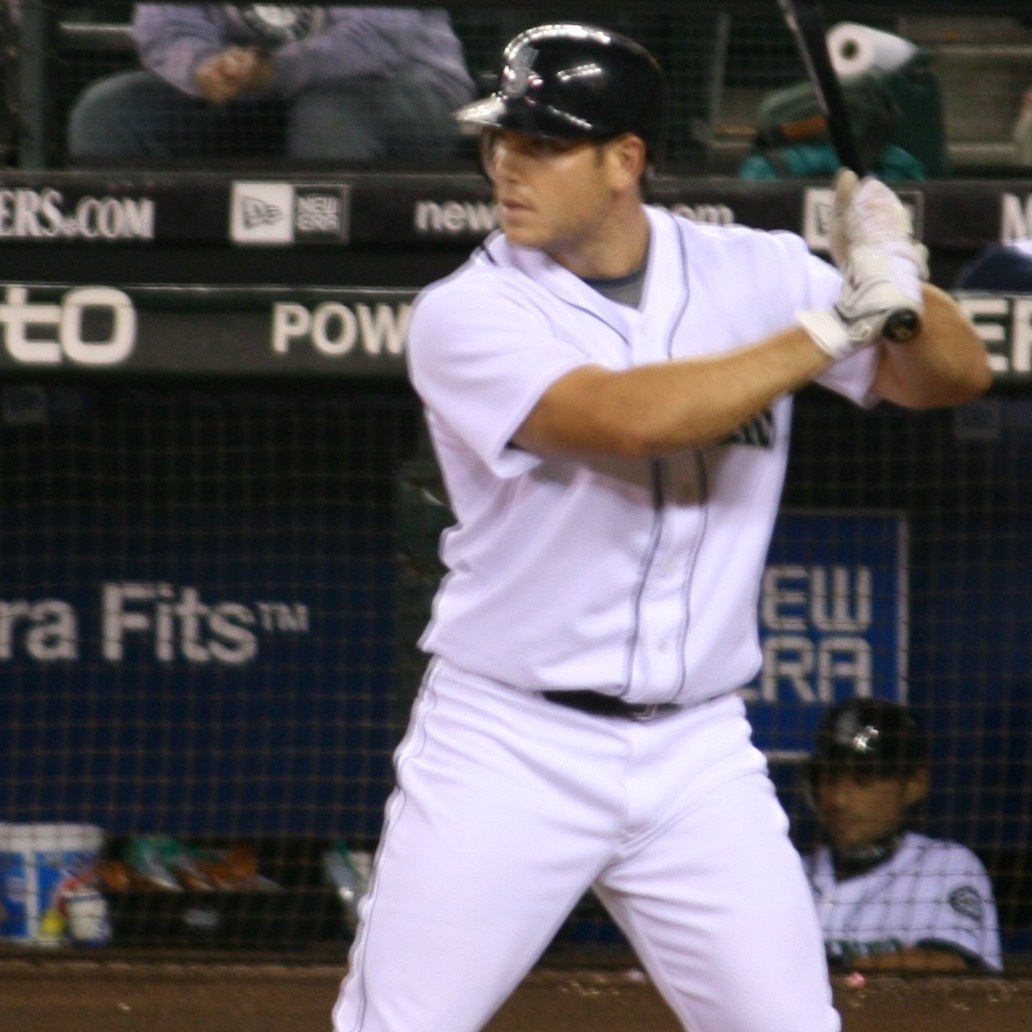
2005 Seattle Mariners draft picks
Jeff Clement (pictured) was the Mariners first round pick in 2005.
Information
**Owner**	Nintendo of America
**General Manager(s)**	Bill Bavasi
**Manager(s)**	Mike Hargrove
**First pick**	Jeff Clement (Rule 4) Jason Bourgeois (Rule 5)
**Draft positions**	5 (Rule 4) 4 (Rule 5)
**Number of selections**	50 (Rule 4) 1 (Rule 5)
**Players signed (Rule 4)**	26
Links
**Results**	The Baseball Cube
**Official Site**	The Official Site of the Seattle Mariners
**Years**	2004 • 2005 • 2006

Below is a list of 2005 Seattle Mariners draft picks. The Mariners took part in both the Rule 4 draft (June amateur draft) and the Rule 5 draft. The first selection by the Mariners in the Rule 4 draft was catcher Jeff Clement. The first and only player selected by Seattle in the Rule 5 draft was infielder Jason Bourgeois.

=== Key ===
Round (Pick)	Indicates the round and pick the player was drafted
Position	Indicates the secondary/collegiate position at which the player was drafted, rather than the professional position the player may have gone on to play
**Bold**	Indicates the player signed with the Mariners
Italics	Indicates the player did not sign with the Mariners

=== Table ===
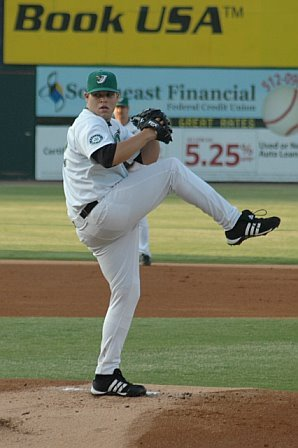
Justin Thomas was selected in the fourth round of the 2005 draft.

Round (Pick)	Name	Position	School	Ref
1 (3)	**Jeff Clement**	Catcher	University of Southern California	
4 (113)	**Justin Thomas**	Left-handed pitcher	Youngstown State University	
5 (143)	**Stephen Kahn**	Right-handed pitcher	Loyola Marymount University	
6 (173)	Michael Lynn	Right-handed pitcher	Brownsburg High School	
7 (203)	**Robert Rohrbaugh**	Left-handed pitcher	Clemson University	
8 (233)	**David Asher**	Left-handed pitcher	Florida International University	
9 (263)	**Bryan Sabatella**	Third baseman	Quinnipiac College	
10 (293)	**Ronald Prettyman**	Third baseman	California State University, Fullerton	
11 (323)	Brian Contreras	Outfielder	Puerto Rico Baseball Academy and High School	
12 (353)	**Anthony Varvaro**	Right-handed pitcher	St. John's University	
13 (383)	**Reed Eastley**	Shortstop	Niagara University	
14 (413)	Bradley Boyer	Second baseman	University of Arizona	
15 (443)	John Holdzkom	Right-handed pitcher	Rancho Cucamonga High School	
16 (473)	Grant Gerrard	Outfielder	Southern Illinois University	
17 (503)	James Russell	Left-handed pitcher	Navarro College	
18 (533)	**Curtis Ledbetter**	First baseman	University of Nebraska–Lincoln	
19 (563)	**Brett Bannister**	Right-handed pitcher	University of Southern California	
20 (593)	**Travis Scott**	Catcher	Lincoln Land Community College	
21 (623)	**Nicholas Allen**	Right-handed pitcher	Villanova University	
22 (653)	**Alex Gary**	Outfielder	Virginia Commonwealth University	
23 (683)	Ryan Lindgren	Right-handed pitcher	Stillwater High School	
24 (713)	**Kevin Gergel**	Catcher	Kennesaw State University	
25 (743)	**William Brown**	Left-handed pitcher	Downey High School	
26 (773)	**Ari Kafka**	Right-handed pitcher	Quinnipiac College	
27 (803)	Jeremy Hill	Right-handed pitcher	Ohlone College	
28 (883)	**Lance Beus**	Left-handed pitcher	Brigham Young University	
29 (863)	Eric Thomas	Outfielder	Buchholz High School	
30 (893)	**Aric Van Gaalen**	Left-handed pitcher	Edmonton Cracker-Cats (Independent baseball)	
31 (923)	**Jeffrey Gilmore**	Right-handed pitcher	Stanford University	
32 (953)	**John Heckman**	Second baseman	Indiana University	
33 (983)	**Julian Henson**	Catcher	Cordova High School	
34 (1013)	Andrew Schneider	Right-handed pitcher	Franklin High School	
35 (1043)	Blake Amador	Outfielder	Modesto Junior College	
36 (1073)	Ross Kwan	Catcher	Seattle Preparatory School	
37 (1103)	Jesse Costa	Right-handed pitcher	Magnolia High School	
38 (1133)	Joe Agreste	First baseman	Greenbrier Christian Academy	
39 (1163)	Duke Welker	Right-handed pitcher	Seminole State College	
40 (1192)	Eugene Edwards	Outfielder	Long Beach Community College	
41 (1221)	**Joseph White**	First baseman	Georgia Perimeter College	
42 (1250)	**Kevin Reynolds**	Outfielder	Quincy University	
43 (1279)	Philip Roy	Right-handed pitcher	Miami Southridge High School	
44 (1308)	Paul Patterson	Right-handed pitcher	Northern Kentucky University	
45 (1337)	Luis Coste	Outfielder	Cochise County Community College	
46 (1366)	**Rufus Lumry**	Left-handed pitcher	Princeton University	
47 (1395)	**Andrew Hargrove**	First baseman	Kent State University	
48 (1423)	Matthew Gardner	Right-handed pitcher	Grayson County Community College	
49 (1450)	Dennis Raben	First baseman	St. Thomas Aquinas High School	
50 (1477)	Xavier Scruggs	First baseman	Poway High School	

== Rule 5 draft ==
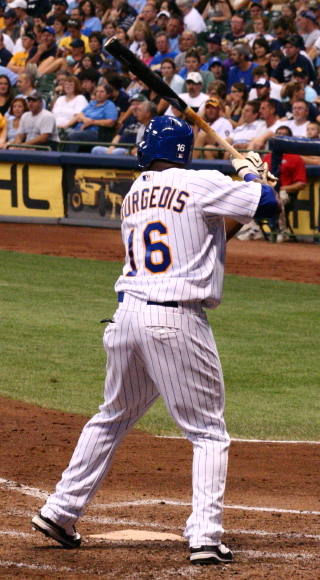
Jason Bourgeois was the Mariners only Rule 5 selection in 2005.

=== Key ===
Pick	Indicates the pick the player was drafted
Previous team	Indicates the previous organization, not Minor league team

=== Table ===
Phase (Pick)	Name	Position	Previous team	Notes	Ref
Triple-A (4)	Jason Bourgeois	Infielder	Atlanta Braves	He spent the entire season with the Double-A San Antonio Missions.	
