= 1999 College Baseball All-America Team =

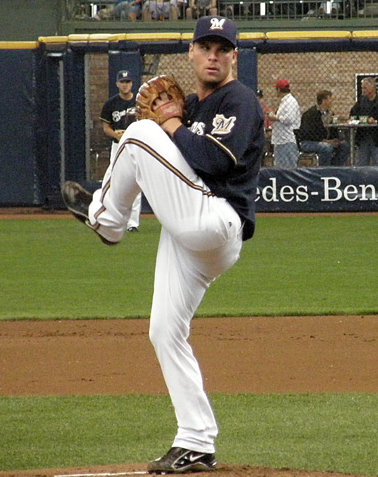
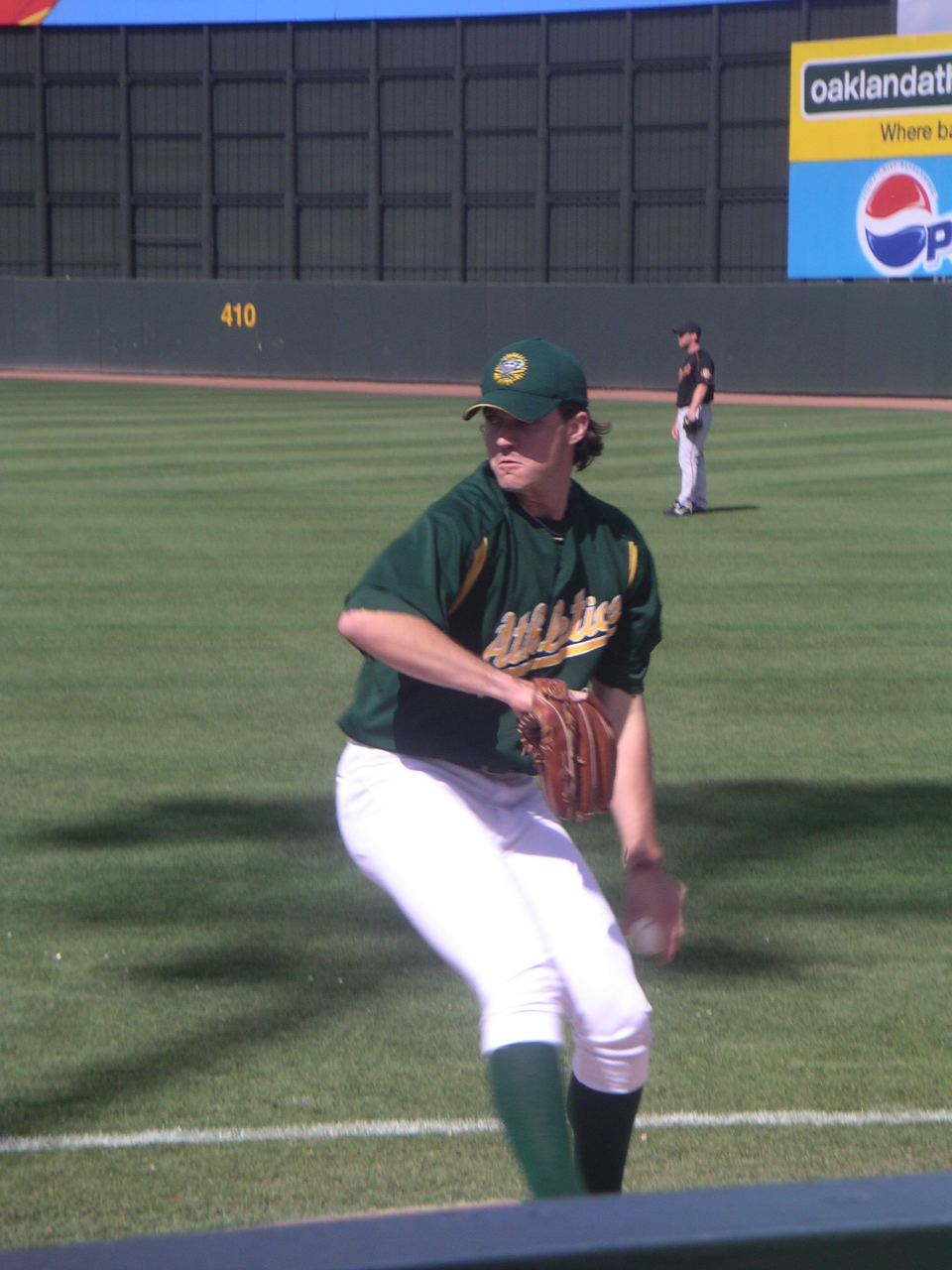
1999 All-Americans included 4× MLB All-Star Ben Sheets (left) and 2002 Cy Young Award winner Barry Zito (right).

This is a list of college baseball players named first team All-Americans for the 1999 NCAA Division I baseball season. In 1999, there were five generally recognized All-America selectors for baseball: the American Baseball Coaches Association, Baseball America, the Collegiate Baseball Newspaper, the National Collegiate Baseball Writers Association, and USA Today Baseball Weekly. The Sporting News did not name a team in this season. In order to be considered a "consensus" All-American, a player must have been selected by at least three of these.

== Key ==
A	American Baseball Coaches Association
B	Baseball America
C	Collegiate Baseball Newspaper
N	National Collegiate Baseball Writers Association
U	USA Today Baseball Weekly
	Member of the National College Baseball Hall of Fame
	Consensus All-American – selected by all five organizations
	Consensus All-American – selected by three or four organizations

== All-Americans ==
Position	Name	School	#	A	B	C	N	U	Other awards and honors
Starting pitcher	Kurt Ainsworth	LSU	1	—	✓	—	—	—	
Starting pitcher	Phil Devey	Southwestern Louisiana	1	—	—	—	✓	—	
Starting pitcher	Cosey Fossum	Texas A&M	1	—	—	—	✓	—	
Starting pitcher	Mike Gallo	Long Beach State	1	—	—	—	✓	—	
Starting pitcher	Mike MacDougal	Wake Forest	1	—	✓	—	—	—	
Starting pitcher	Todd Moser	Florida Atlantic	4	✓	—	✓	✓	✓	
Starting pitcher	Mario Ramos	Rice	4	✓	—	✓	✓	✓	
Starting pitcher	Ben Sheets	Northeast Louisiana	4	✓	✓	✓	✓	—	
Starting pitcher	Nick Stocks	Florida State	1	—	—	—	✓	—	
Starting pitcher	Jason Young	Stanford	1	—	—	—	✓	—	
Starting pitcher	Barry Zito	USC	5	✓	✓	✓	✓	✓	
Relief pitcher	Brendan Belanger	Tulane	1	—	—	✓	—	—	
Relief pitcher	Jay Gehrke	Pepperdine	4	✓	✓	✓	—	✓	
Catcher	Josh Bard	Texas Tech	3	✓	✓	—	✓	—	
Catcher	Casey Dunn	Auburn	2	—	—	—	✓	✓	
Catcher	Eric Munson	USC	1	—	—	—	✓	—	
Catcher	Chad Sutter	Tulane	1	—	—	✓	—	—	
First baseman	Ben Broussard	McNeese State	1	—	—	—	✓	—	
First baseman / DH	Ken Harvey	Nebraska	5	✓	✓	✓	✓	✓	
First baseman	Jon Palmieri	Wake Forest	2	—	✓	—	✓	—	
Second baseman	Kevin Hooper	Wichita State	1	—	—	—	✓	—	
Second baseman	Marshall McDougall	Florida State	5	✓	✓	✓	✓	✓	College World Series Most Outstanding Player
Shortstop	Willie Bloomquist	Arizona State	3	✓	✓	✓	—	—	
Shortstop	Bobby Hill	Miami (FL)	1	—	—	—	✓	—	
Shortstop	Andy Phillips	Alabama	1	—	—	—	✓	—	
Shortstop	Brian Roberts	South Carolina	1	—	—	—	—	✓	
Shortstop	Damon Thames	Rice	1	—	—	—	✓	—	
Third baseman	Hunter Bledsoe	Vanderbilt	2	—	—	✓	✓	—	
Third baseman	Tagg Bozied	San Francisco	3	—	—	✓	✓	✓	
Third baseman	Ryan Gripp	Creighton	1	✓	—	—	—	—	
Third baseman	Royce Huffman	TCU	1	—	—	—	✓	—	
Third baseman	Xavier Nady	California	2	—	✓	—	✓	—	
Outfielder	Matt Cepicky	Southwest Missouri State	4	—	✓	✓	✓	✓	
Outfielder	Matt Diaz	Florida State	2	✓	—	—	✓	—	
Outfielder	Daylan Holt	Texas A&M	4	✓	✓	—	✓	✓	
Outfielder	Jason Lane	USC	1	—	—	—	—	✓	
Outfielder	Lamont Matthews	Oklahoma State	1	—	—	—	✓	—	
Outfielder	Spencer Oborn	Cal State Fullerton	3	✓	—	✓	✓	—	
Outfielder	Keith Reed	Providence	3	✓	✓	—	✓	—	
Outfielder	Jeff Stallings	Oral Roberts	1	—	—	✓	—	—	
Designated hitter	Macky Waguespack	Southeastern Louisiana	1	✓	—	—	—	—	
Utility player	Mike Dwyer	Richmond	1	—	—	—	✓	—	
Utility player	Jason Jennings	Baylor	5	✓	✓	✓	✓	✓	Dick Howser Trophy Golden Spikes Award ABCA Player of the Year Baseball America Player of the Year Collegiate Baseball Player of the Year Rotary Smith Award

== See also ==
- List of college baseball awards
