= 2005 Baltimore Orioles season =

Major League Baseball season

2005 Baltimore Orioles
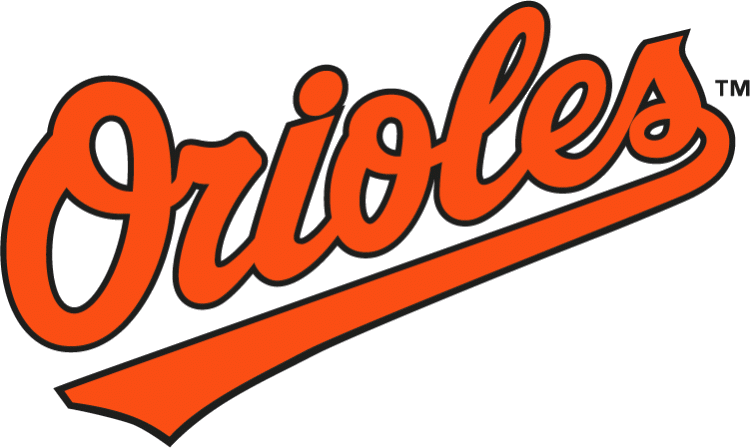
- League: American League
- Division: East
- Ballpark: Oriole Park at Camden Yards
- City: Baltimore
- Record: 74–88 (.457)
- Divisional place: 4th
- Owners: Peter Angelos
- General managers: Jim Beattie/Mike Flanagan
- Managers: Lee Mazzilli and Sam Perlozzo
- Television: WJZ-TV; WNUV; Comcast SportsNet (Jim Palmer, Jim Hunter, Buck Martinez, Fred Manfra, Dave Raymond)
- Radio: WBAL (AM) (Fred Manfra, Jim Hunter, Joe Angel, Dave Raymond)

The 2005 Baltimore Orioles season was the 105th season in Baltimore Orioles franchise history, the 52nd in Baltimore, and the 14th at Oriole Park at Camden Yards. They failed to improve on their 78–84 (.481) record from the previous year with a 74–88 record, and missed the postseason for the 8th straight season. The team started off hot, compiling a record of 42 wins and 30 losses while spending 62 days in first place in the AL East. After June 23, the team started slipping on the way to a losing record and manager Lee Mazzilli's dismissal in early August.

== Offseason ==
- December 7, 2004: B.J. Surhoff was signed as a free agent with the Baltimore Orioles.
- January 18, 2005: Midre Cummings was signed as a free agent with the Baltimore Orioles.
- February 2, 2005: Sammy Sosa was traded by the Chicago Cubs with cash to the Baltimore Orioles for Jerry Hairston, Mike Fontenot, and Dave Crouthers (minors).

== Regular season ==
=== Season standings ===
AL East
| Team | W | L | Pct. | GB | Home | Road |
|---|---|---|---|---|---|---|
| New York Yankees | 95 | 67 | .586 | — | 53‍–‍28 | 42‍–‍39 |
| Boston Red Sox | 95 | 67 | .586 | — | 54‍–‍27 | 41‍–‍40 |
| Toronto Blue Jays | 80 | 82 | .494 | 15 | 43‍–‍38 | 37‍–‍44 |
| Baltimore Orioles | 74 | 88 | .457 | 21 | 36‍–‍45 | 38‍–‍43 |
| Tampa Bay Devil Rays | 67 | 95 | .414 | 28 | 40‍–‍41 | 27‍–‍54 |

=== Record vs. opponents ===
2005 American League record Source: MLB Standings Grid – 2005
| Team | BAL | BOS | CWS | CLE | DET | KC | LAA | MIN | NYY | OAK | SEA | TB | TEX | TOR | NL |
|---|---|---|---|---|---|---|---|---|---|---|---|---|---|---|---|
| Baltimore | — | 8–10 | 2–6 | 1–6 | 3–5 | 4–2 | 2–4 | 3–3 | 7–11 | 4–6 | 7–3 | 12–6 | 4–6 | 9–10 | 8–10 |
| Boston | 10–8 | — | 4–3 | 4–2 | 6–4 | 4–2 | 6–4 | 4–2 | 9–10 | 6–4 | 3–3 | 13–6 | 7–2 | 7–11 | 12–6 |
| Chicago | 6–2 | 3–4 | — | 14–5 | 14–5 | 13–5 | 4–6 | 11–7 | 3–3 | 2–7 | 6–3 | 4–2 | 3–6 | 4–2 | 12–6 |
| Cleveland | 6–1 | 2–4 | 5–14 | — | 12–6 | 13–6 | 3–5 | 10–9 | 3–4 | 6–3 | 7–3 | 4–6 | 3–3 | 4–2 | 15–3 |
| Detroit | 5–3 | 4–6 | 5–14 | 6–12 | — | 10–9 | 4–6 | 8–11 | 1–5 | 1–5 | 5–4 | 5–2 | 4–2 | 4–3 | 9–9 |
| Kansas City | 2–4 | 2–4 | 5–13 | 6–13 | 9–10 | — | 2–7 | 6–13 | 3–3 | 2–4 | 2–7 | 3–5 | 2–8 | 3–6 | 9–9 |
| Los Angeles | 4–2 | 4–6 | 6–4 | 5–3 | 6–4 | 7–2 | — | 6–4 | 6–4 | 10–9 | 9–9 | 4–5 | 15–4 | 1–5 | 12–6 |
| Minnesota | 3–3 | 2–4 | 7–11 | 9–10 | 11–8 | 13–6 | 4–6 | — | 3–3 | 4–6 | 6–4 | 6–0 | 3–6 | 4–2 | 8–10 |
| New York | 11–7 | 10–9 | 3–3 | 4–3 | 5–1 | 3–3 | 4–6 | 3–3 | — | 7–2 | 7–3 | 8–11 | 7–3 | 12–6 | 11–7 |
| Oakland | 6–4 | 4–6 | 7–2 | 3–6 | 5–1 | 4–2 | 9–10 | 6–4 | 2–7 | — | 12–6 | 4–5 | 11–8 | 5–5 | 10–8 |
| Seattle | 3–7 | 3–3 | 3–6 | 3–7 | 4–5 | 7–2 | 9–9 | 4–6 | 3–7 | 6–12 | — | 4–2 | 6–13 | 4–6 | 10–8 |
| Tampa Bay | 6–12 | 6–13 | 2–4 | 6–4 | 2–5 | 5–3 | 5–4 | 0–6 | 11–8 | 5–4 | 2–4 | — | 6–2 | 8–11 | 3–15 |
| Texas | 6–4 | 2–7 | 6–3 | 3–3 | 2–4 | 8–2 | 4–15 | 6–3 | 3–7 | 8–11 | 13–6 | 2–6 | — | 7–3 | 9–9 |
| Toronto | 10–9 | 11–7 | 2–4 | 2–4 | 3–4 | 6–3 | 5–1 | 2–4 | 6–12 | 5–5 | 6–4 | 11–8 | 3–7 | — | 8–10 |

== Season summary ==
The Baltimore Orioles were in contention up to the all-star break, in second place, posting a record of 47–40. The Orioles trailed the Red Sox by just 2 games. The Orioles, however, posted a 27–48 record after the all-star break, finishing 21 games behind the Boston Red Sox and the New York Yankees.

=== Transactions ===
- June 8, 2005: Eli Marrero was traded by the Kansas City Royals for minor leaguer Pete Maestrales.
- July 30, 2005: Eric Byrnes was traded by the Colorado Rockies to the Baltimore Orioles for Larry Bigbie.
- August 11, 2005: Midre Cummings was released by the Baltimore Orioles.

=== Roster ===
2005 Baltimore Orioles
Roster
| Pitchers: 23,19 James Baldwin; 30 Rick Bauer; 45 Érik Bédard; 40 Tim Byrdak; 35 Daniel Cabrera; 27 Bruce Chen; 28 Eric DuBose; 38 Jason Grimsley; 50 Jorge Julio; 41 Steve Kline; 13 Rodrigo López; 61 John Maine; 36 John Parrish; 49 Hayden Penn; 43 Sidney Ponson; 47 Aaron Rakers; 37 Chris Ray; 39 Steve Reed; 52 B. J. Ryan; 53 Todd Williams | Catchers: 26 Sal Fasano; 9 Gerónimo Gil; 18 Javy López; 77 Eli Whiteside; Infielders: 64 Bernie Castro; 23,58 Alejandro Freire; 14 Chris Gomez; 6 Melvin Mora; 25 Rafael Palmeiro; 1 Brian Roberts; 67 Ed Rogers; 10 Miguel Tejada; 75 Walter Young | Outfielders: 3 Larry Bigbie; 15 Eric Byrnes; 37 Napoleón Calzado; 3 Midre Cummings; 16 Jeff Fiorentino; 31 Jay Gibbons; 16 Eli Marrero; 32 Luis Matos; 11 David Newhan; 15 Ramón Nivar; 28 Keith Reed; 21 Sammy Sosa; 17 B. J. Surhoff | Manager: 13 Lee Mazzilli; 2 Sam Perlozzo; Coaches: 48 Terry Crowley (hitting); 24 Rick Dempsey (first base); 44 Elrod Hendricks (bullpen catcher); 34 Ray Miller (pitching); 2 Sam Perlozzo (bench); 49 Tom Trebelhorn (third base) |

== Player stats ==
=== Batting ===
==== Starters by position ====
Note: Pos = Position; G = Games played; AB = At bats; H = Hits; Avg. = Batting average; HR = Home runs; RBI = Runs batted in

| Pos | Player | G | AB | H | Avg. | HR | RBI |
|---|---|---|---|---|---|---|---|
| C | Javy López | 103 | 395 | 110 | .278 | 15 | 49 |
| 1B | Rafael Palmeiro | 110 | 369 | 98 | .266 | 18 | 60 |
| 2B | Brian Roberts | 143 | 561 | 176 | .314 | 18 | 73 |
| 3B | Melvin Mora | 149 | 593 | 168 | .283 | 27 | 88 |
| SS | Miguel Tejada | 162 | 654 | 199 | .304 | 26 | 98 |
| LF | Larry Bigbie | 67 | 206 | 51 | .248 | 5 | 21 |
| CF | Luis Matos | 121 | 389 | 109 | .280 | 4 | 32 |
| RF | Sammy Sosa | 102 | 380 | 84 | .221 | 14 | 45 |
| DH | Jay Gibbons | 139 | 488 | 135 | .277 | 26 | 79 |

==== Other batters ====
Note: G = Games played; AB = At bats; H = Hits; Avg. = Batting average; HR = Home runs; RBI = Runs batted in

| Player | G | AB | H | Avg. | HR | RBI |
|---|---|---|---|---|---|---|
| BJ Surhoff | 91 | 303 | 78 | .257 | 5 | 34 |
| Chris Gomez | 89 | 219 | 61 | .279 | 1 | 18 |
| David Newhan | 96 | 218 | 44 | .202 | 5 | 21 |
| Eric Byrnes | 52 | 167 | 32 | .192 | 3 | 11 |
| Sal Fasano | 64 | 160 | 40 | .250 | 11 | 20 |
| Gerónimo Gil | 62 | 125 | 24 | .192 | 4 | 17 |
| Bernie Castro | 24 | 80 | 23 | .288 | 0 | 7 |
| Alejandro Freire | 25 | 65 | 16 | .246 | 1 | 4 |
| Eli Marrero | 22 | 50 | 11 | .220 | 3 | 10 |
| Jeff Fiorentino | 13 | 44 | 11 | .250 | 1 | 5 |
| Walter Young | 14 | 33 | 10 | .303 | 1 | 3 |
| Ramón Nivar | 7 | 13 | 4 | .308 | 0 | 1 |
| Eli Whiteside | 9 | 12 | 3 | .250 | 0 | 1 |
| Keith Reed | 6 | 5 | 1 | .200 | 0 | 1 |
| Napoleón Calzado | 4 | 5 | 1 | .200 | 0 | 0 |
| Midre Cummings | 2 | 2 | 0 | .000 | 0 | 0 |
| Ed Rogers | 8 | 1 | 1 | 1.000 | 1 | 2 |

=== Pitching ===
==== Starting pitchers ====
Note: G = Games pitched; IP = Innings pitched; W = Wins; L = Losses; ERA = Earned run average; SO = Strikeouts

| Player | G | IP | W | L | ERA | SO |
|---|---|---|---|---|---|---|
| Rodrigo López | 35 | 209.1 | 15 | 12 | 4.90 | 118 |
| Bruce Chen | 34 | 197.1 | 13 | 10 | 3.83 | 133 |
| Daniel Cabrera | 29 | 161.1 | 10 | 13 | 4.52 | 157 |
| Érik Bédard | 24 | 141.2 | 6 | 8 | 4.00 | 125 |
| Sidney Ponson | 23 | 130.1 | 7 | 11 | 6.21 | 68 |

==== Other pitchers ====
Note: G = Games pitched; IP = Innings pitched; W = Wins; L = Losses; ERA = Earned run average; SO = Strikeouts

| Player | G | IP | W | L | ERA | SO |
|---|---|---|---|---|---|---|
| John Maine | 10 | 40.0 | 2 | 3 | 6.30 | 24 |
| Hayden Penn | 8 | 38.1 | 3 | 2 | 6.34 | 18 |

==== Relief pitchers ====
Note: G = Games pitched; W = Wins; L = Losses; SV = Saves; ERA = Earned run average; SO = Strikeouts

| Player | G | W | L | SV | ERA | SO |
|---|---|---|---|---|---|---|
| BJ Ryan | 69 | 1 | 4 | 36 | 2.43 | 100 |
| Todd Williams | 72 | 5 | 5 | 1 | 3.30 | 38 |
| Jorge Julio | 67 | 3 | 5 | 0 | 5.90 | 58 |
| Steve Kline | 67 | 2 | 4 | 0 | 4.28 | 36 |
| Tim Byrdak | 41 | 0 | 1 | 1 | 4.05 | 31 |
| Chris Ray | 41 | 1 | 3 | 0 | 2.66 | 43 |
| Steve Reed | 30 | 1 | 2 | 0 | 6.61 | 15 |
| Jason Grimsley | 22 | 1 | 2 | 0 | 5.73 | 10 |
| James Baldwin | 20 | 0 | 0 | 0 | 3.20 | 20 |
| Eric DuBose | 15 | 2 | 3 | 0 | 4.05 | 31 |
| John Parrish | 14 | 1 | 0 | 0 | 3.12 | 25 |
| Aaron Rakers | 10 | 1 | 0 | 0 | 3.29 | 11 |
| Rick Bauer | 5 | 0 | 0 | 0 | 9.72 | 5 |

== Farm system ==
| Level | Team | League | Manager |
|---|---|---|---|
| AAA | Ottawa Lynx | International League | Dave Trembley |
| AA | Bowie Baysox | Eastern League | Don Werner |
| A | Frederick Keys | Carolina League | Bien Figueroa |
| A | Delmarva Shorebirds | South Atlantic League | Gary Kendall |
| A-Short Season | Aberdeen IronBirds | New York–Penn League | Andy Etchebarren |
| Rookie | Bluefield Orioles | Appalachian League | Jesus Alfaro |

LEAGUE CHAMPIONS: Frederick
