= 2005 Detroit Tigers season =

Major League Baseball season

2005 Detroit Tigers
- League: American League
- Division: Central
- Ballpark: Comerica Park
- City: Detroit, Michigan
- Record: 71–91 (.438)
- Divisional place: 4th
- Owners: Mike Ilitch
- General managers: Dave Dombrowski
- Managers: Alan Trammell
- Television: FSN Detroit (Mario Impemba, Rod Allen)
- Radio: WXYT (AM) (Jim Price, Dan Dickerson)

The 2005 Detroit Tigers season was the team's 105th season and its sixth at Comerica Park. It involved the Detroit Tigers finishing fourth in the American League Central with a 71–91 record, 28 games back of the World Series Champion Chicago White Sox. The Tigers hosted the All-Star Game on July 12.

== Offseason ==
- October 15, 2004: DeWayne Wise was selected off waivers by the Detroit Tigers from the Atlanta Braves.
- February 7, 2005: Magglio Ordóñez was signed as a free agent with the Detroit Tigers.
- February 7, 2005: DeWayne Wise was released by the Detroit Tigers.
- February 28, 2005: DeWayne Wise was signed as a free agent with the Detroit Tigers.

== Regular season ==
=== Season standings ===
AL Central
Team	W	L	Pct.	GB	Home	Road
Chicago White Sox	99	63	.611	—	47‍–‍34	52‍–‍29
Cleveland Indians	93	69	.574	6	43‍–‍38	50‍–‍31
Minnesota Twins	83	79	.512	16	45‍–‍36	38‍–‍43
Detroit Tigers	71	91	.438	28	39‍–‍42	32‍–‍49
Kansas City Royals	56	106	.346	43	34‍–‍47	22‍–‍59

=== Record vs. opponents ===
2005 American League record Source: MLB Standings Grid – 2005
Team	BAL	BOS	CWS	CLE	DET	KC	LAA	MIN	NYY	OAK	SEA	TB	TEX	TOR	NL
Baltimore	—	8–10	2–6	1–6	3–5	4–2	2–4	3–3	7–11	4–6	7–3	12–6	4–6	9–10	8–10
Boston	10–8	—	4–3	4–2	6–4	4–2	6–4	4–2	9–10	6–4	3–3	13–6	7–2	7–11	12–6
Chicago	6–2	3–4	—	14–5	14–5	13–5	4–6	11–7	3–3	2–7	6–3	4–2	3–6	4–2	12–6
Cleveland	6–1	2–4	5–14	—	12–6	13–6	3–5	10–9	3–4	6–3	7–3	4–6	3–3	4–2	15–3
Detroit	5–3	4–6	5–14	6–12	—	10–9	4–6	8–11	1–5	1–5	5–4	5–2	4–2	4–3	9–9
Kansas City	2–4	2–4	5–13	6–13	9–10	—	2–7	6–13	3–3	2–4	2–7	3–5	2–8	3–6	9–9
Los Angeles	4–2	4–6	6–4	5–3	6–4	7–2	—	6–4	6–4	10–9	9–9	4–5	15–4	1–5	12–6
Minnesota	3–3	2–4	7–11	9–10	11–8	13–6	4–6	—	3–3	4–6	6–4	6–0	3–6	4–2	8–10
New York	11–7	10–9	3–3	4–3	5–1	3–3	4–6	3–3	—	7–2	7–3	8–11	7–3	12–6	11–7
Oakland	6–4	4–6	7–2	3–6	5–1	4–2	9–10	6–4	2–7	—	12–6	4–5	11–8	5–5	10–8
Seattle	3–7	3–3	3–6	3–7	4–5	7–2	9–9	4–6	3–7	6–12	—	4–2	6–13	4–6	10–8
Tampa Bay	6–12	6–13	2–4	6–4	2–5	5–3	5–4	0–6	11–8	5–4	2–4	—	6–2	8–11	3–15
Texas	6–4	2–7	6–3	3–3	2–4	8–2	4–15	6–3	3–7	8–11	13–6	2–6	—	7–3	9–9
Toronto	10–9	11–7	2–4	2–4	3–4	6–3	5–1	2–4	6–12	5–5	6–4	11–8	3–7	—	8–10

=== Transactions ===
- June 8, 2005: Ugueth Urbina was traded by the Detroit Tigers with Ramón Martínez to the Philadelphia Phillies for Plácido Polanco.

=== Roster ===
2005 Detroit Tigers
Roster
Pitchers: 38 Jeremy Bonderman; 43 Román Colón; 52 Doug Creek; 51 Vic Darensbourg; 57 Craig Dingman; 53 Sean Douglass; 44 Kyle Farnsworth; 62 Franklyn Germán; 34 Matt Ginter; 50 Andrew Good; 49 Jason Grilli; 21 Jason Johnson; 39 Jason Karnuth; 41 Wilfredo Ledezma; 46 Mike Maroth; 40 Troy Percival; 37 Nate Robertson; 56 Fernando Rodney; 48 Chris Spurling; 74 Ugueth Urbina; 59 Justin Verlander; 50 Mark Woodyard	Catchers: 7 Iván Rodríguez; 26 Vance Wilson; Infielders: 39 Tony Giarratano; 9 Carlos Guillén; 20 Omar Infante; 15 Brandon Inge; 14 Ramón Martínez; 36 John McDonald; 12 Carlos Peña; 14 Plácido Polanco; 31 Chris Shelton; 17 Jason Smith; 25 Dmitri Young	Outfielders: 43 Alexis Gómez; 28 Curtis Granderson; 4 Bobby Higginson; 49 Kevin Hooper; 19 Nook Logan; 27 Craig Monroe; 30 Magglio Ordóñez; 33 Marcus Thames; 24 Rondell White	Manager: 3 Alan Trammell; Coaches: 54 Bob Cluck (pitching); 29 Bruce Fields (hitting); 22 Kirk Gibson (bench); 18 Mick Kelleher (first base); 13 Lance Parrish (bullpen); 8 Juan Samuel (third base)

== Player stats ==
= Indicates team leader

=== Batting ===
==== Starters by position ====
Note: Pos = Position; G = Games played; AB = At bats; H = Hits; Avg. = Batting average; HR = Home runs; RBI = Runs batted in

Pos	Player	G	AB	H	Avg.	HR	RBI
C	Iván Rodríguez	129	504	139	.276	14	50
1B	Chris Shelton	107	388	116	.299	18	59
2B	Plácido Polanco	86	343	116	.338	6	36
3B	Brandon Inge	160	616	161	.261	16	72
SS	Carlos Guillén	87	334	107	.320	5	23
LF	Craig Monroe	157	567	157	.277	20	89
CF	Nook Logan	129	322	83	.258	1	17
RF	Magglio Ordóñez	82	305	92	.302	8	46
DH	Dmitri Young	126	469	127	.271	21	72

==== Other batters ====
Note: G = Games played; AB = At bats; H = Hits; Avg. = Batting average; HR = Home runs; RBI = Runs batted in

Player	G	AB	H	Avg.	HR	RBI
Omar Infante	121	406	90	.222	9	43
Rondell White	97	374	117	.313	12	53
Carlos Peña	79	260	61	.235	18	44
Curtis Granderson	47	162	44	.272	8	20
Vance Wilson	61	152	30	.197	3	19
Marcus Thames	38	107	21	.196	7	16
John McDonald	31	73	19	.260	0	4
Jason Smith	27	58	11	.190	0	2
Ramón Martínez	19	56	15	.268	0	5
Tony Giarratano	15	42	6	.143	1	4
Bobby Higginson	10	26	2	.077	0	1
Alexis Gómez	9	16	3	.188	0	1
Kevin Hooper	6	5	1	.200	0	0

=== Pitching ===
==== Starting and other pitchers ====
Note: G = Games pitched; IP = Innings pitched; W = Wins; L = Losses; ERA = Earned run average; SO = Strikeouts

Player	G	IP	W	L	ERA	SO
Jason Johnson	33	210.0	8	13	4.54	93
Mike Maroth	34	209.0	14	14	4.74	115
Nate Robertson	32	196.2	7	16	4.48	122
Jeremy Bonderman	29	189.0	14	13	4.57	145
Sean Douglass	18	87.1	5	5	5.56	55
Wilfredo Ledezma	10	49.2	2	4	7.07	30
Román Colón	12	25.0	1	1	6.12	17
Jason Grilli	3	16.0	1	1	3.38	5
Justin Verlander	2	11.1	0	2	7.15	7

==== Relief pitchers ====
Note: G = Games pitched; W = Wins; L = Losses; SV = Saves; ERA = Earned run average; SO = Strikeouts

Player	G	W	L	SV	ERA	SO
Fernando Rodney	39	2	3	9	2.86	42
Chris Spurling	56	3	4	0	3.44	26
Franklyn Germán	58	4	0	1	3.66	38
Jamie Walker	66	4	3	0	3.70	30
Kyle Farnsworth	46	1	1	6	2.32	55
Matt Ginter	14	0	1	0	6.17	15
Craig Dingman	34	2	3	4	3.66	24
Ugueth Urbina	25	1	3	9	2.63	31
Troy Percival	26	1	3	8	5.76	20
Doug Creek	20	0	0	0	6.85	18
Vic Darensbourg	22	1	1	0	2.82	9
Mark Woodyard	3	0	0	0	1.50	3
Andrew Good	2	0	0	0	5.40	7
Jason Karnuth	3	0	0	0	5.40	0

== Awards and honors ==
All-Star Game

- Ivan Rodriguez, Catcher, Reserve

== Farm system ==
Level	Team	League	Manager
AAA	Toledo Mud Hens	International League	Larry Parrish
AA	Erie SeaWolves	Eastern League	Duffy Dyer
A	Lakeland Tigers	Florida State League	Mike Rojas
A	West Michigan Whitecaps	Midwest League	Matt Walbeck
A-Short Season	Oneonta Tigers	New York–Penn League	Tom Brookens
Rookie	GCL Tigers	Gulf Coast League	Kevin Bradshaw

LEAGUE CHAMPIONS: Toledo
