= Kevin Hooper =

Kevin Hooper may refer to:

- Kevin Hooper (baseball)
- Kevin Hooper (politician)
