= Ken Harvey (baseball) =

American baseball player (born 1978)

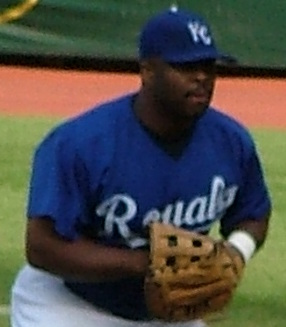
- Harvey with the Kansas City Royals in 2004
- First baseman / Designated hitter
- Born: March 1, 1978 (age 48); Los Angeles, California, U.S.
- Batted: Right Threw: Right

MLB debut
- September 18, 2001, for the Kansas City Royals

Last MLB appearance
- May 18, 2005, for the Kansas City Royals

MLB statistics
- Batting average: .274
- Home runs: 27
- Runs batted in: 126
- Stats at Baseball Reference

Teams
- Kansas City Royals (2001, 2003–2005)

Career highlights and awards
- All-Star (2004)

Kenneth Eugene Harvey (born March 1, 1978) is an American former Major League Baseball first baseman.

Harvey earned consensus first-team All-America honors in 1999 at Nebraska, leading the Huskers to a Big 12 Tournament title and an NCAA appearance. He led the nation with a .478 average, while hitting 23 homers and driving in 86 runs. Although he made his name on offense, Harvey was the Easton Redline Defensive Player of the Year after committing just two errors in 1999. A career .426 hitter, Harvey was selected in the fifth round of the 1999 MLB draft by the Kansas City Royals.

Harvey played his rookie season in Kansas City in 2003. After an impressive first half of the 2004 season, featuring an early battle with Baltimore Orioles Melvin Mora for the AL lead in batting average, Harvey was selected as the Royals' lone representative in the All-Star Game. In interleague play with no designated hitter, the Royals played Harvey in left field in order to keep both Harvey and 1B/DH Mike Sweeney, their two most productive bats, in the lineup.

After struggling the second half of the 2004 season, Harvey found himself battling Calvin Pickering for his roster spot the following spring. After hitting .238 in spring training, the Royals sent Harvey to their Triple-A Omaha affiliate on March 29, 2005. In 18 games at Omaha, Harvey hit .375 with three home runs and 14 RBI and was recalled less than a month later on April 28. However, after playing in only 12 games, during which he batted just .222 with five RBI, Harvey was placed on the disabled list on May 22 due to recurring back problems.

On December 8, 2006, Harvey signed a minor league contract with the Minnesota Twins with an invitation to spring training. He opted for minor league free agency on November 3, 2007. In 2008, he played for the Kansas City T-Bones in the independent Northern League. He split the 2009 season between the T-Bones and the Southern Maryland Blue Crabs of the independent Atlantic League.
