= Alejandro Freire =

Venezuelan baseball player (born 1974)

- First baseman
- Born: August 23, 1974 (age 51); Caracas, Venezuela
- Batted: Right Threw: Right

MLB debut
- August 9, 2005, for the Baltimore Orioles

Last MLB appearance
- October 1, 2005, for the Baltimore Orioles

MLB statistics
- Batting average: .246
- Home runs: 1
- Runs batted in: 4
- On-base percentage: .319
- Stats at Baseball Reference

Teams
- Baltimore Orioles (2005)

Alejandro Freire (Spanish pronunciation: [aleˈxandɾo ˈfɾejɾe]; born August 23, 1974) is a Venezuelan former first baseman in Major League Baseball who played briefly for the Baltimore Orioles during the 2005 season. Listed at 6' 2", 220 lb., Freire batted and threw right-handed.

== Biography ==
Born in Caracas, Venezuela, Freire debuted as a rookie in 1994, with the GCL Astros, a minor league affiliate team of the Houston Astros. He spent nearly twelve full seasons in the minors, playing also for the Detroit, St. Louis, San Francisco and Baltimore systems before reaching the majors. In between, Freire played winter ball for the Águilas del Zulia, Caribes de Oriente, Navegantes del Magallanes and Tiburones de La Guaira clubs of the Venezuelan Professional Baseball League from 1995 through 2006.

Freire debuted with the Orioles in the middle of the 2005 season. He gained the promotion after hitting 299 with 19 home runs and 69 RBI in 106 games for Triple-A Ottawa Lynx. In 25 games for Baltimore he hit .246 (16-for-65) with one home run and four RBI, appearing as a backup for Rafael Palmeiro (in 16 games) or as designated hitter (9).

Freire divided his playing time between Ottawa and with the independent Camden Riversharks in 2006, his last professional season. He hit a combined .289 average with 184 home runs and 741 RBI in 1323 games for 12 different minor league teams between 1994, and 2006.

Following his playing retirement, Freire has worked as a color commentator for ESPN Deportes during winter baseball.

== See also ==
- 2005 Baltimore Orioles season
- Cup of coffee
- Players from Venezuela in MLB
