= Jeff Harris (baseball) =

American baseball player (born 1974)

- Pitcher
- Born: July 4, 1974 (age 51); Alameda, California, U.S.
- Batted: Right Threw: Right

MLB debut
- April 2, 2005, for the Seattle Mariners

Last MLB appearance
- April 11, 2006, for the Seattle Mariners

MLB statistics
- Win–loss record: 2–5
- Earned run average: 4.26
- Strikeouts: 26
- Stats at Baseball Reference

Teams
- Seattle Mariners (2005–2006)

Jeffrey Austin Harris (born July 4, 1974) is an American former Major League Baseball relief pitcher and coach who pitched for the Seattle Mariners in 2005 and 2006. He was drafted by the Minnesota Twins in 1995 MLB draft out of the University of San Francisco.

== Career ==
When Harris debuted with the Seattle Mariners on April 2, 2005, he was 31 years of age. This was unusually old for a major league rookie and came after a long minor league tenure. Hespent six years in the Minnesota Twins organization before being released in 2000, then played for the Chico Heat of the independent Western Baseball League in 2001 and 2002. Harris played for the Quebec Capitales of the Canadian-American Association of Professional Baseball beginning in 2003 and played for the Rieleros de Aguascalientes of the Mexican League at the start of 2004. The Mariners scouted Harris playing for the Capitales and signed him in June 2004.

Harris made eight starts and three long-relief appearances in the 2005 season. He posted a 2–5 record with 25 strikeouts and a 4.19 ERA in 54 2/3 innings. In 2006, Harris pitched in only 3 games early in season.

In December 2006, the Cleveland Indians signed Harris to a minor league contract. He became a free agent at the end of the 2008 season and retired. He was named the pitching coach of the Arizona League Indians for the 2009 season. He later then the pitching coach for the Lake County Captains. He was the pitching coach for the Akron RubberDucks in 2014 and 2015.

Harris has also worked as a scout. He worked as a pro scout for the Philadelphia Phillies in 2019. In 2025, he was a scouting supervisor for the Cincinnati Reds.
