= Lew Ford =

American baseball player (born 1976)

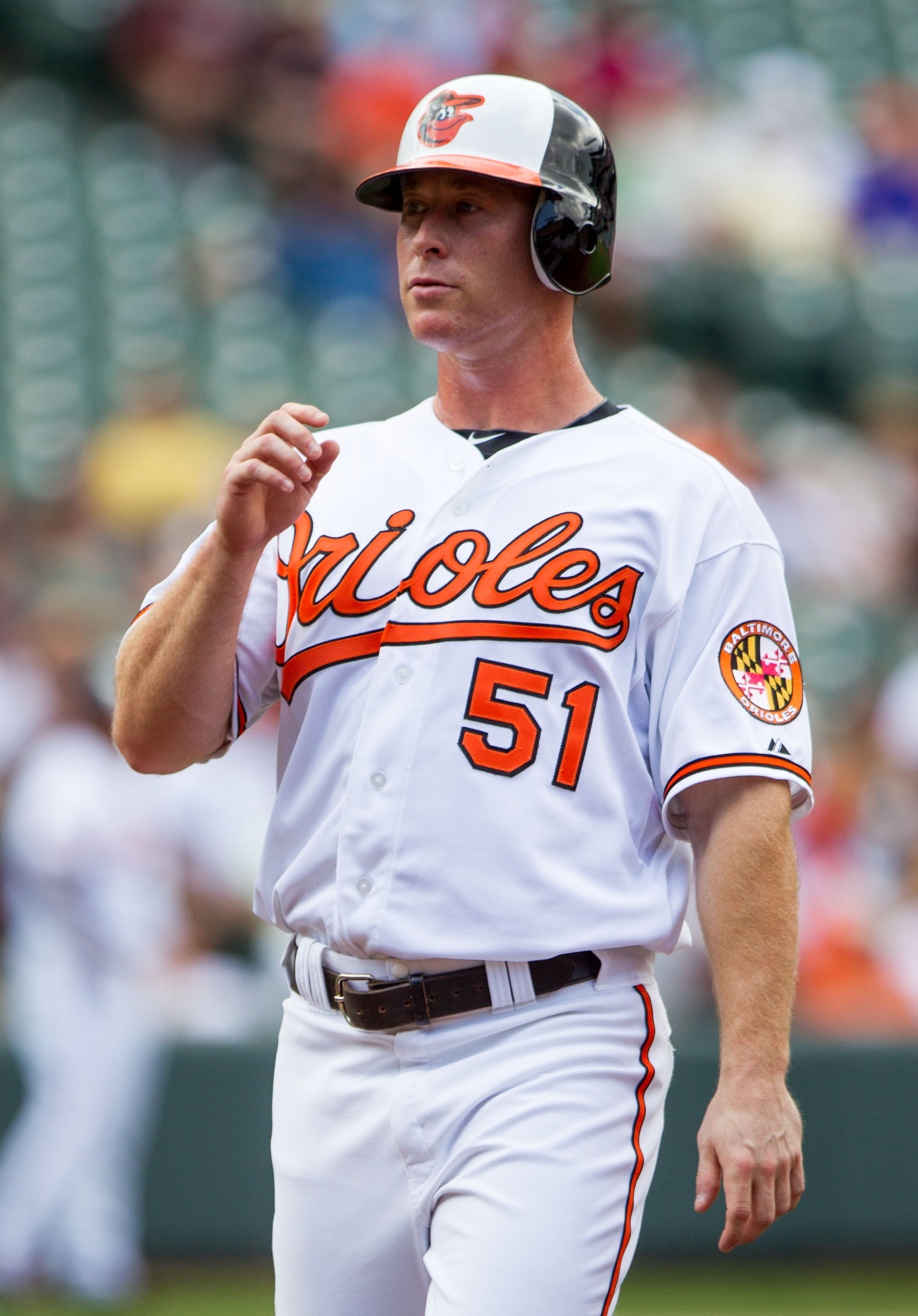
- Ford with the Baltimore Orioles in 2012

Long Island Ducks – No. 20
- Outfielder / Manager
- Born: August 12, 1976 (age 49); Beaumont, Texas, U.S.
- Batted: Right Threw: Right

MLB debut
- May 29, 2003, for the Minnesota Twins

Last MLB appearance
- September 29, 2012, for the Baltimore Orioles

MLB statistics
- Batting average: .268
- Home runs: 35
- Runs batted in: 176

NPB statistics
- Batting average: .225
- Home runs: 3
- Runs batted in: 11
- Stats at Baseball Reference

Teams
- Minnesota Twins (2003–2007); Hanshin Tigers (2008); Baltimore Orioles (2012)

Jon Lewis Ford (born August 12, 1976) is an American former professional baseball outfielder and current manager for the Long Island Ducks of the Atlantic League of Professional Baseball. He played in Major League Baseball (MLB) for the Minnesota Twins, Baltimore Orioles, and in Nippon Professional Baseball (NPB) for the Hanshin Tigers.

== Playing career ==
Ford is a 1994 graduate of Port Neches–Groves High School where he played football and baseball and is also a 1999 graduate of Dallas Baptist University. He also played college baseball at Texas A&M University, Seminole State Junior College, and Lee College.

In 1998, Ford was a first team All-American at Dallas Baptist. He set their single school batting record, batting .507 over the course of more than 50 games. In spite of this, Ford was not chosen in the MLB draft. He came back the following year and had another season at Dallas Baptist.

=== Boston Red Sox ===
Ford was drafted by the Boston Red Sox in the 12th round of the 1999 Major League Baseball draft. In 2000, he played his first full year of Single-A ball for the Augusta Greenjackets of the South Atlantic League. He had a good season, stealing 52 bases on 56 attempts and established the team single-season batting record by hitting .315, adding 74 RBI from the leadoff spot. Baseball America named him as the best defensive outfielder in Single-A and The Sporting News identified him as the Best 5-Tool Prospect in the Red Sox organization. He led all of minor league baseball in runs scored with 122.

=== Minnesota Twins ===
On September 9, 2000, Ford was traded to the Minnesota Twins for Héctor Carrasco. He also led all of Minor League Baseball in runs scored in 2002.

He is known for an episode of accidentally burning himself with a hotel iron, which is often erroneously told as a result of the attempted ironing of a shirt while wearing it.

In 2004, he had 170 hits in 154 games with 15 home runs, 20 stolen bases and 31 doubles while batting .299. He finished tied for 24th in the American League's Most Valuable Player balloting, garnering a total 2 points out of a possible 392.

Ford was named AL Player of the Week for the week ending August 21, 2005. He helped the Twins take three out of four games from the Seattle Mariners after hitting 12-for-33, including 3 home runs, and leading the league in RBI's and runs for that week.

Ford was out-righted to the minor leagues on October 5, 2007, but refused the assignment and became a free agent.

=== Hanshin Tigers ===
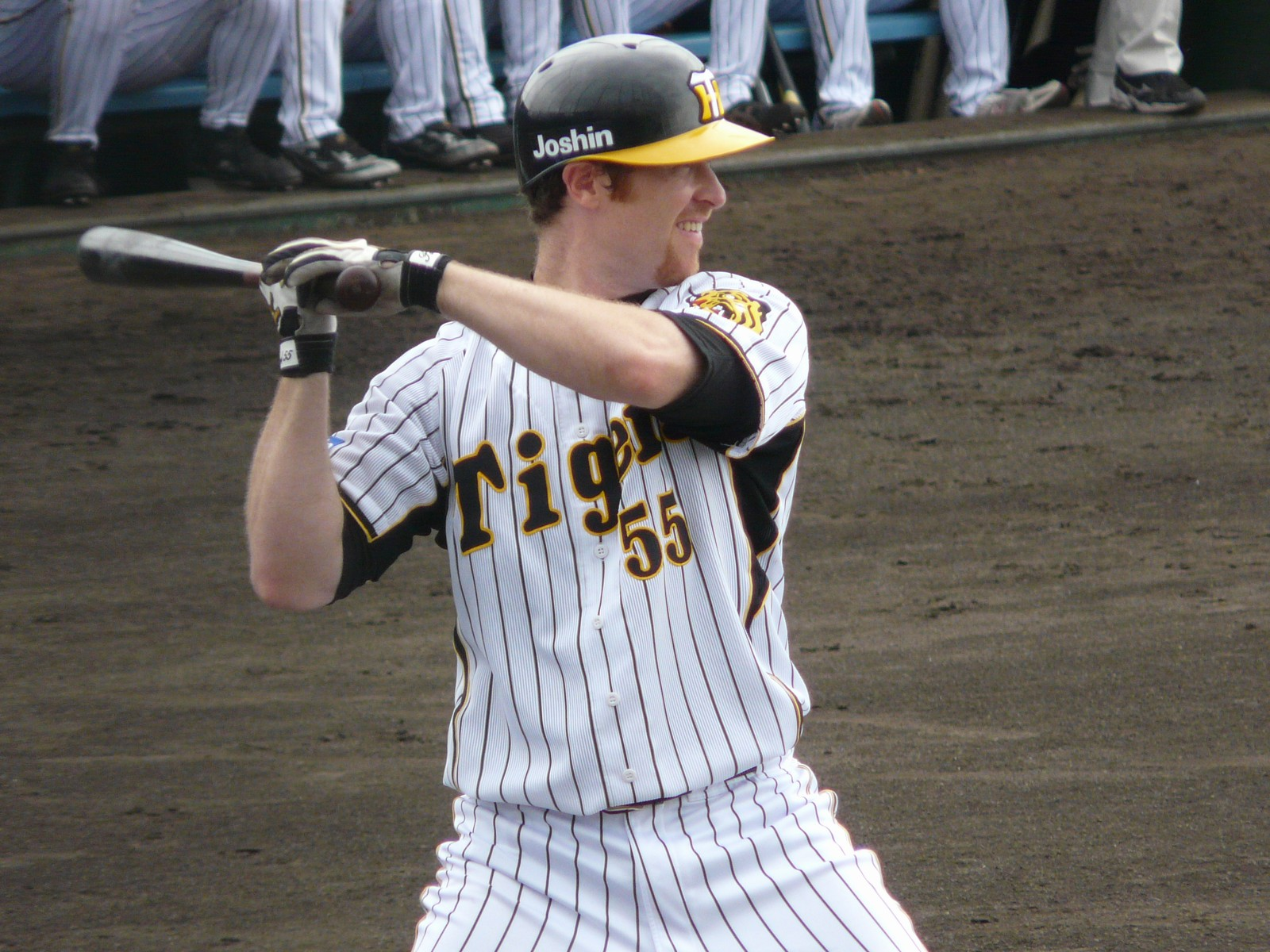
Ford batting for the Hanshin Tigers in 2008.

Ford Signed with the Hanshin Tigers in Japan's Nippon Professional Baseball on November 29, 2007.

=== Colorado Rockies ===
In March 2009, Ford signed a minor league contract with the Colorado Rockies, but did not play the season there.

=== Long Island Ducks/Cincinnati Reds ===
On August 24, 2009, Ford signed a minor league contract with the Cincinnati Reds. Ford was a member of the Long Island Ducks when he posted 10 home runs, 2 triples, and 55 RBI's in 93 games. The Texas native finished second in the league in batting average (.330) and fourth in on-base percentage (.407). His efforts earned him a contract with the Cincinnati Reds organization.

=== Guerreros de Oaxaca ===
Played in (2010) with the Guerreros de Oaxaca of the Mexican League.

=== Long Island Ducks (second stint) ===
On March 7, 2011, Ford signed with the Long Island Ducks of the independent Atlantic League of Professional Baseball.

=== Baltimore Orioles ===
On May 19, 2012, Ford signed with the Baltimore Orioles; he was subsequently assigned to the Triple-A Norfolk Tides. On July 29, Ford appeared in an MLB lineup for the first time since 2007. He batted fifth and played left field for the Orioles. Ford hit home runs for the Orioles in consecutive games against the Chicago White Sox on August 27 and August 28. He finished the year hitting .183/.256/.352 with three home runs and four RBI in 25 games. On November 2, Ford was out-righted off the 40-man roster and elected free agency four days later.

On November 9, 2012, Ford re-signed with the Orioles organization on a minor league contract and was invited to the team's spring training.

On August 26, 2013, Ford was released from the Bowie Baysox, the Orioles' Double-A affiliate.

=== Long Island Ducks (third stint) ===
Ford finished the 2013 season playing for the Long Island Ducks of the Atlantic League. Ford stated the 2014 season playing for the Ducks as a starting outfielder.

On October 29, 2014, Ford was named the 2014 Atlantic League Player of the Year. Ford's 2014 season was highlighted by breaking two Atlantic League records. He finished the year with 189 hits, surpassing the previous high of 170 set by Victor Rodriguez (Somerset) in 2004. In addition, Ford became the first player in league history to play in all 140 games during the regular season. Navarrete and Wayne Lydon (Camden) had previously held the record of 139, which was set in 2009. The 38-year old led the Atlantic League in doubles (40) during the 2014 campaign and finished second in batting average (.347), runs batted in (95), runs scored (100), total bases (278), and on-base percentage (.415). Ford earned Atlantic League Player of the Month honors in May after compiling a .402 batting average with 47 hits and a .470 on-base percentage. Two months later, he was selected to play in the Atlantic League All-Star Game at Constellation Field in Sugar Land, Texas. The former big leaguer's defense was also outstanding, as he did not commit a single error in 97 games played in the outfield. He became a free agent after the 2016 season.

On May 28, 2017, Ford re-signed with the Long Island Ducks of the Atlantic League for the 2017 season.

On February 6, 2018, Ford re-signed with the Long Island Ducks for the 2018 season.

On January 15, 2019, Ford re-signed with the Ducks for his 10th season with the club, and his sixth as a player-coach.

On January 30, 2020, Ford re-signed with the Ducks for what would've been his 11th season, and seventh as a player-coach. However, Ford did not play in 2020 due to the cancellation of the 2020 ALPB season because of the COVID-19 pandemic. He became a free agent after the season.

On March 4, 2021, Ford re-signed with the Ducks for his 11th season with the club and seventh as a player-coach. On October 2, Ford collected his 964 career hit for the Ducks, becoming the Ducks' all-time hit leader.

On January 12, 2022, Ford re-signed with the Ducks for his 12th season with the team, and eighth as a player-coach. On August 28, Ford recorded his 1,000th ALPB hit in a game against the Charleston Dirty Birds. In doing so, he became the fourth player in Atlantic League history to achieve the feat, joining Bryant Nelson, Jeff Nettles, and Ray Navarrete.

On January 31, 2023, Ford re-signed with the Ducks for his 13th season with the club, and ninth season as a player-coach. In 35 games, he batted .340/.389/.460 with one home run and 14 RBI.

== Coaching career ==
After spending the past nine seasons as a player coach, on November 15, 2023, Ford was named the manager for the Long Island Ducks of the Atlantic League of Professional Baseball.
