= Stephen Kahn =

- Pitcher
- Born: December 14, 1983 (age 42); Fullerton, California, US
- Bats: Left Throws: Right

Stephen Kahn
Medal record

Men's baseball

Representing United States

World University Championship
Gold medal – first place	2004 Tainan	Team

Stephen James Kahn (born December 14, 1983) is an American former professional baseball pitcher. Kahn was drafted in the fifth round of the 2005 Major League Baseball draft by the Seattle Mariners. Kahn attended Servite High School and then Loyola Marymount University prior to being drafted. He was signed by scouts Greg Whitworth, Dennis Gonsalves, and Phil Pote.

Kahn was a member of the 2004 United States national baseball team. He was ranked as the ninth best prospect in the Mariners' organization by the Seattle Post-Intelligencer in 2006. Kahn's pitching repertoire included a 93 to 96-mph four-seam fastball and a curveball.

== Amateur career ==
=== High school ===
Kahn attended Servite High School in Anaheim, California. He earned three varsity letters and was voted Most Valuable Player his freshman year. In his senior season he served as the team's captain. He was drafted in the eight round of the 2002 Major League Baseball draft by the Milwaukee Brewers but did not sign.

=== College ===
In 2003 with Loyola Marymount University, he went 5-4 with a 4.98 ERA in 25 games. He was the West Coast Conference pitcher of the year in 2004. In 2005 with them, he went 5-6 with a 5.60 ERA in 17 games.

He was named West Coast Conference Pitcher of the Year in 2004 and was selected to Team USA where he became a gold medalist at the World University Baseball Championship in Tainan, Taiwan. He was also named as an All-WCC first-team selection. Baseball America named him a top-ten college pitcher. He was also named a 2005 Pre-season All-American by Baseball America. On May 6, 2005 he was named the WCC Player of the Week.

== Professional career ==
He began his professional career in 2005, playing for the AZL Mariners in one game and the Short-Season Everett AquaSox, appearing in 17 games. Kahn made his Short-Season debut on July 30 and gave-up three runs in one inning pitched. He finished fourth in the Northwest League with 14 saves and recorded saves in nine consecutive relief appearances from July 31 to August 17, allowing only one run in nine innings of work. He played in the post-season with the Class-A Wisconsin Timber Rattlers of the Midwest League.

In 2006, he played for the Class-A Advanced Inland Empire 66ers and the Double-A San Antonio Missions. He made 20 appearances for the 66ers, going 2-0 with a 1.95 ERA. However, in 31 games for the Missions, he went 1-3 with a 6.23 ERA. He played for the Peoria Javelinas in the Arizona Fall League. He was named an Arizona Fall League Rising Star during his time in the AFL. He played for the Cardenales de Lara in the 2007 Venezuelan Winter League.

He only played in one game since 2006, as he damaged an ACL in early 2007 and he damaged his other in 2008. He did however get an invitation to spring training in 2008 but was reassigned in the first round of cuts. He also played for the Peoria Javelinas in the Arizona Fall League in at the end of the '08 going 0-1 with one save and an 8.79 ERA in 10 appearances. He was added to the 40-man roster on November 20, 2008.

Kahn was sidelined this season with right shoulder inflammation, and missed 2007 and 2008 with a pair of knee injuries. He was re-signed by the Mariners on February 21, 2009. He was released by the Mariners on September 13, 2009. In early-November 2010, the Mariners re-signed Kahn. He pitched for 24 games in 2011 for the High Desert Mavericks, his last season in affiliated baseball. In 2012, he pitched for the Laredo Lemurs and Winnipeg Goldeyes.
