= Travis Bowyer =

American baseball player

- Pitcher
- Born: August 3, 1981 (age 44); Lynchburg, Virginia, U.S.
- Batted: Right Threw: Right

MLB debut
- September 10, 2005, for the Minnesota Twins

Last MLB appearance
- September 29, 2005, for the Minnesota Twins

MLB statistics
- Win–loss record: 0–1
- Earned run average: 5.59
- Strikeouts: 12
- Stats at Baseball Reference

Teams
- Minnesota Twins (2005)

Travis Charlton Bowyer (born August 3, 1981) is an American former professional baseball relief pitcher. He played for the Minnesota Twins of Major League Baseball in 2005.

== Career ==
On June 2, 1999, Bowyer was drafted out of high school by the Minnesota Twins in the 20th round of the 1999 Major League Baseball draft. After spending his first three seasons in rookie ball, Bowyer rose through the minor league system and made it to the Twins major league roster in 2005. He was traded on December 2, 2005, along with Scott Tyler to the Marlins for Luis Castillo. The Marlins intended to use Bowyer in the bullpen, but due to injury, Bowyer has not pitched since the trade.

In early 2007, Florida Marlins GM Larry Beinfest stated his belief that Bowyer was still a future closer. However, in March, Bowyer was released and re-signed to a minor league deal. He then missed all of 2007 after undergoing shoulder surgery in August 2006. After being out of baseball for seven years, he played in 2012 with the Somerset Patriots of the Atlantic League of Professional Baseball.

== Awards and honors ==
- 2005 - International League All-Star RP
- Participated in the 2005 Futures Game during All-Star Weekend
