= Mark Woodyard =

American baseball player (born 1978)

- Pitcher
- Born: December 19, 1978 (age 47); Mobile, Alabama, U.S.
- Batted: Right Threw: Right

MLB debut
- September 17, 2005, for the Detroit Tigers

Last MLB appearance
- October 1, 2005, for the Detroit Tigers

MLB statistics
- Win–loss record: 0–0
- Earned run average: 1.50
- Strikeouts: 3
- Stats at Baseball Reference

Teams
- Detroit Tigers (2005)

Mark Anthony Woodyard (born December 19, 1978) is an American former professional baseball pitcher, who played three games in Major League Baseball (MLB) for the 2005 Detroit Tigers. He batted and threw right-handed.

Woodyard played high school baseball as a pitcher at Mobile County High School in Grand Bay, Alabama. In his senior year, he helped lead the team to the Alabama 4A Baseball Championship.

After graduation, Woodyard attended Bethune-Cookman University. He was drafted by the Detroit Tigers in the 4th round of the 2000 Major League Baseball draft. In three games, Woodyard pitched in six innings with a 1.50 earned run average (ERA).

After becoming a free agent following the 2006 season, Woodyard played for the independent St. George Starzz of the Golden Baseball League and Newark Bears of the Atlantic League in 2007. After sitting out the 2008 season, he signed with the independent Grand Prairie AirHogs of the American Association on January 26, 2009, but was traded to the Southern Maryland Blue Crabs of the Atlantic League on March 5. However, Woodyard never pitched for either team, and has not played professionally since.
