= Napoleón Calzado =

Dominican baseball player (born 1977)

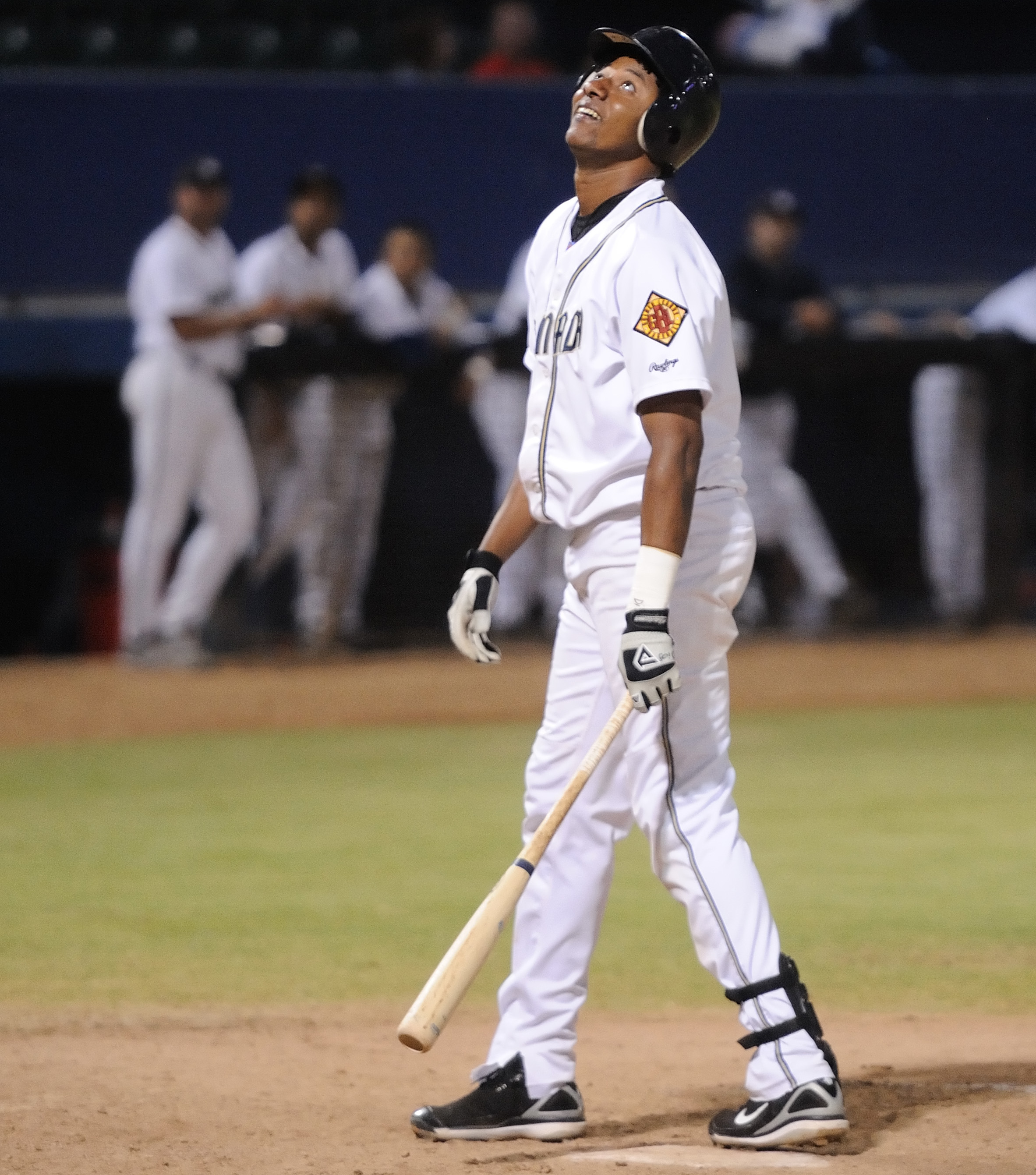
- Calzado with the Long Beach Armada in 2009
- Outfielder
- Born: February 9, 1977 (age 48); Santo Domingo, Dominican Republic
- Batted: Right Threw: Right

MLB debut
- May 29, 2005, for the Baltimore Orioles

Last MLB appearance
- June 7, 2005, for the Baltimore Orioles

MLB statistics
- Batting average: .200
- Home runs: 0
- Runs batted in: 0

CPBL statistics
- Batting average: .313
- Home runs: 3
- Runs batted in: 32
- Stats at Baseball Reference

Teams
- Baltimore Orioles (2005); dmedia T-REX (2008)
Medals
Men's baseball
Representing Dominican Republic
Central American and Caribbean Games
Gold medal – first place	2010 Mayagüez	Team
Bronze medal – third place	2002 San Salvador	Team
Intercontinental Cup
Bronze medal – third place	2002 Havana	Team

Napoleón Calzado (born February 9, 1977) is a Dominican former Major League Baseball player for the Baltimore Orioles. He won the bronze medal in the 2000 Pan American Championship where this national team qualified for the 2001 Baseball World Cup.

Calzado played for the Orioles in the 2005 season. In four games, he had one hit in five at bats, playing the outfield. He batted and threw right-handed. He spent his entire career, except for a portion of 2004 with the Atlanta Braves, with the Orioles after being signed as an amateur free agent in 1996. In December 2008, Calzado and 8 teammates on the dMedia T-Rex were accused of throwing games from the Chinese Professional Baseball League. On June 26, 2009, Calzado signed with the Long Beach Armada, Golden Baseball League in Long Beach, California. He played with the national team in the 2010 Central American and Caribbean Games played in Mayagüez, Puerto Rico, winning the tournament's gold medal. During this tournament, Calzado was scouted and later signed by the Nicaraguan team Indios del Bóer to play the 2010–11 Nicaraguan Professional Baseball League season, helping his team to win the championship.
