= Dave Gassner =

American baseball player (born 1978)

- Pitcher
- Born: December 14, 1978 (age 47); Hortonville, Wisconsin, U.S.
- Batted: Right Threw: Left

MLB debut
- April 16, 2005, for the Minnesota Twins

Last appearance
- April 21, 2005, for the Minnesota Twins

MLB statistics
- Win–loss record: 1-0
- Earned run average: 5.87
- Strikeouts: 2
- Stats at Baseball Reference

Teams
- Minnesota Twins (2005)

David K. Gassner (born December 14, 1978) is an American former professional baseball pitcher. Gassner is a 1997 graduate of Hortonville High School in Hortonville, Wisconsin and 2002 graduate of Purdue University with a degree in Education.

== Career ==
Gassner played college baseball for the Purdue Boilermakers from 1998–2001.

He was selected by Toronto Blue Jays in the 2001 amateur entry draft, and played in their minor league organization from 2001 through 2003

On December 15, 2003, Gassner was sent to the Minnesota Twins to complete a trade made on July 16, 2003 where the Blue Jays sent Shannon Stewart and a player to be named later (Gassner) to the Twins for Bobby Kielty.

Gassner spent the entire 2004 season with the Rochester Red Wings of the International League. On April 16, 2005 made his major league debut for the Twins against the Cleveland Indians getting the win by pitching 6 innings giving up only one earned run. Gassner was to have only one more start for the Twins, spending most of the season with the Rochester Red Wings.

Gassner missed the majority of the 2006 season with a left elbow strain and spent the entire 2007 season with the Rochester Red Wings where he compiled a 6-12 record and a 4.95 ERA.

Gassner started the 2008 season playing for the York Revolution of the Atlantic League, but on June 6, 2008 he was signed to a minor league contract by the Boston Red Sox and assigned to the Double-A Portland Sea Dogs.

On June 7 Gassner made his first start for the Sea Dogs against the Akron Aeros earning a no decision after pitching 5 2/3 innings, allowing 6 hits and 2 earned runs. He became a free agent at the end of the season. Gassner signed with the York Revolution of the Atlantic League for the 2009 season. He retired on August 26, 2009.

== Awards and recognition ==
- 2001 – Big Ten Conference All-Star SP
- 2003 – Eastern League (AA) All-Star and League ERA Leader.
- 2004 – Triple-A All-Star SP
- 2007 – International League Pitcher of the Week

== After baseball life ==
In 2010, Gassner was named head coach of the Appleton West varsity baseball team in Appleton, Wisconsin. He is also a substitute teacher in the fields of science and mathematics for the Appleton Area School District.
