= Keith Reed =

American baseball player (born 1978)

- Outfielder
- Born: October 8, 1978 (age 47); Yarmouth Port, Massachusetts, U.S.
- Batted: Right Threw: Right

MLB debut
- May 11, 2005, for the Baltimore Orioles

Last MLB appearance
- May 18, 2005, for the Baltimore Orioles

MLB statistics
- Batting average: .200
- Home runs: 0
- Runs batted in: 1
- Stats at Baseball Reference

Teams
- Baltimore Orioles (2005)

Keith A. Reed (born October 8, 1978) is an American former outfielder for the Baltimore Orioles of the Major League Baseball (MLB).

Reed was one of Baltimore's seven first-round draft picks in the 1999 Major League Baseball draft. He was the Orioles #1 prospect in 2001 and made his major league debut on May 11, 2005, called up to replace Sammy Sosa on the roster. Reed played only 6 games with the Orioles, getting 1 hit in 5 at bats. He spent all of 2006 with Triple-A Ottawa, hitting .279 with 10 home runs and 65 RBI.

After the 2006 season, Reed signed with the Newark Bears of the independent Atlantic League. He batted .286 and set career-highs in home runs, RBI, stolen bases, hits, runs, and at-bats, helping the team win the atlantic league championship over the Somerset Patriots that September. In 2008, Reed had an even better season, hitting .295 with 26 home runs and 93 RBI.
