= Kevin Hooper (baseball) =

American baseball player (born 1976)

- Second baseman
- Born: December 7, 1976 (age 48); Lawrence, Kansas, U.S.
- Batted: Right Threw: Right

MLB debut
- July 9, 2005, for the Detroit Tigers

Last MLB appearance
- September 24, 2006, for the Detroit Tigers

MLB statistics
- Batting average: .125
- Home runs: 0
- Runs batted in: 0

Teams
- Detroit Tigers (2005–2006)

Kevin James Hooper (born December 7, 1976) is an American former professional baseball infielder who played for the Detroit Tigers of Major League Baseball (MLB). He was also the manager of the Wichita Wingnuts of the independent American Association.

== Career ==
=== Amateur career ===
Hooper attended Wichita State University and was named to the All-Missouri Valley Conference team in 1999, and led Wichita State in batting average at .402.

He was originally drafted in the 49th round of the 1998 Major League Baseball draft, by the Cleveland Indians, but did not sign.

=== Florida Marlins ===
He was then drafted in 1999, this time in the 8th round, by the Florida Marlins. He signed with the Marlins on June 3, 1999. In 1999, he played with the Low-A Utica Blue Sox of the New York–Penn League. In 2000, he moved up to Single-A playing for the Kane County Cougars, for 2000 and only part of 2001, after 17 games he was moved to Double-A Portland Sea Dogs. In 2002 he made the move to Triple-A Calgary Cannons. In 2003 he stayed in Triple-A, but this time with the Albuquerque Isotopes, where he remained until he was claimed off waivers by the New York Yankees.

=== New York Yankees ===
The Yankees claimed him off waivers from Florida on May 26, 2004, where he played for the Columbus Clippers the Triple-A team for the Yankees, at the time. He played there until the Yankees released him on August 6, 2004.

=== Kansas City Royals ===
The Kansas City Royals signed him as a free agent on August 13, 2004. He played for Triple-A Omaha Royals for the remainder of the season. He was granted free agency on October 15, 2004.

=== Detroit Tigers ===
The Detroit Tigers signed him as a free agent in the 2005 offseason. He played for the Detroit Tigers and Toledo Mud Hens after being signed and gained two Governors' Cup Championships with Toledo in 2005 and 2006. During a home game, the last of the season against the Indianapolis Indians, Kevin Hooper played one inning in every position of the game, including a successful inning pitching. On September 2, 2006, his contract was purchased by the Tigers. On October 11, 2006, he was designated for assignment and refused, becoming a free agent. On November 17, 2006, Hooper was re-signed by the Tigers and invited to spring training in Lakeland, Florida. He became a free agent after the 2007 season in which he spent the whole season in Triple-A

=== Houston Astros ===
On November 28, 2007, Hooper signed a minor league contract with an invitation to spring training with the Houston Astros.

=== Wichita Wingnuts ===
Before the 2008 season started, Hooper signed with the Wichita Wingnuts, where he was the starting shortstop. He hit .373, winning the American Association batting title, and was successful in 34 of 35 stolen base attempts. At the end of the season, he was named the Wingnuts MVP. On November 6, 2008, Hooper was named the manager of the Wingnuts. Hooper left Wichita prior to the 2016 season to coach in the San Diego Padres farm system. The Wingnuts replaced him with Pete Rose Jr. as their new manager.
