= 2007 Baltimore Orioles season =

Major League Baseball season

2007 Baltimore Orioles
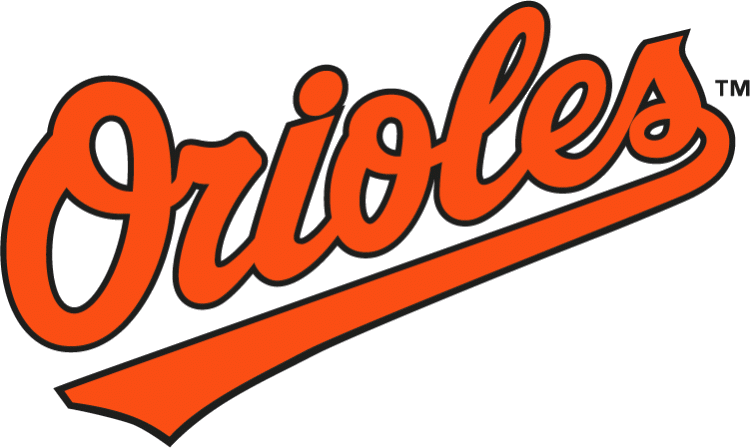
- League: American League
- Division: East
- Ballpark: Oriole Park at Camden Yards
- City: Baltimore
- Record: 69–93 (.426)
- Divisional place: 4th
- Owners: Peter Angelos
- General managers: Mike Flanagan, Andy MacPhail
- Managers: Sam Perlozzo (until 06/18); Dave Trembley
- Television: MASN; WJZ-TV (CBS 13)
- Radio: WHFS

The 2007 Baltimore Orioles season was the 107th season in Baltimore Orioles franchise history, the 54th in Baltimore, and the 16th at Oriole Park at Camden Yards.

The Orioles finished with a record of 69 wins and 93 losses and fourth place in the AL East. On June 18, 2007, manager Sam Perlozzo was fired and replaced with bullpen coach Dave Trembley as interim manager. Trembley was named full-time manager on August 22, 2007. On this same day, the Orioles suffered a 30 to 3 loss to the Texas Rangers, the most lopsided loss in franchise history. Perlozzo's record was 29 wins, and 40 losses and Trembley's was 40 wins and 53 losses.

== Offseason ==
- November 12, 2006: Jaret Wright was traded by the New York Yankees with cash to the Baltimore Orioles for Chris Britton.
- February 2, 2007: Paul Shuey was signed as a free agent with the Baltimore Orioles.

== Regular season ==
=== Season standings ===
AL East
Team	W	L	Pct.	GB	Home	Road
Boston Red Sox	96	66	.593	—	51‍–‍30	45‍–‍36
New York Yankees	94	68	.580	2	52‍–‍29	42‍–‍39
Toronto Blue Jays	83	79	.512	13	49‍–‍32	34‍–‍47
Baltimore Orioles	69	93	.426	27	35‍–‍46	34‍–‍47
Tampa Bay Devil Rays	66	96	.407	30	37‍–‍44	29‍–‍52

=== Record vs. opponents ===
2007 American League record Source: MLB Standings Grid – 2007
Team	BAL	BOS	CWS	CLE	DET	KC	LAA	MIN	NYY	OAK	SEA	TB	TEX	TOR	NL
Baltimore	—	6–12	5–3	3–4	1–5	7–0	3–7	0–7	9–9	4–4	2–7	11–7	4–6	8–10	6–12
Boston	12–6	—	7–1	5–2	3–4	3–3	6–4	4–3	8–10	4–4	4–5	13–5	6–4	9–9	12–6
Chicago	3–5	1–7	—	7–11	11–7	12–6	5–4	9–9	4–6	4–5	1–7	6–1	2–4	3–4	4–14
Cleveland	4–3	2–5	11–7	—	12–6	11–7	5–5	14–4	0–6	6–4	4–3	8–2	6–3	4–2	9–9
Detroit	5–1	4–3	7–11	6–12	—	11–7	3–5	12–6	4–4	4–6	6–4	3–4	5–4	4–3	14–4
Kansas City	0–7	3–3	6–12	7–11	7–11	—	5–2	9–9	1–9	6–4	3–6	4–3	5–4	3–4	10–8
Los Angeles	7–3	4–6	4–5	5–5	5–3	2–5	—	6–3	6–3	9–10	13–6	6–2	10–9	3–4	14–4
Minnesota	7–0	3–4	9–9	4–14	6–12	9–9	3–6	—	2–5	5–2	6–3	3–4	7–2	4–6	11–7
New York	9–9	10–8	6–4	6–0	4–4	9–1	3–6	5–2	—	2–4	5–5	10–8	5–1	10–8	10–8
Oakland	4–4	4–4	5–4	4–6	6–4	4–6	10–9	2–5	4–2	—	5–14	4–6	9–10	5–4	10–8
Seattle	7–2	5–4	7–1	3–4	4–6	6–3	6–13	3–6	5–5	14–5	—	4–3	11–8	4–5	9–9
Tampa Bay	7–11	5–13	1–6	2–8	4–3	3–4	2–6	4–3	8–10	6–4	3–4	—	5–4	9–9	7–11
Texas	6–4	4–6	4–2	3–6	4–5	4–5	9–10	2–7	1–5	10–9	8–11	4–5	—	5–5	11–7
Toronto	10–8	9–9	4–3	2–4	3–4	4–3	4–3	6–4	8–10	4–5	5–4	9–9	5–5	—	10–8

=== Transactions ===
- June 30, 2007: Gustavo Molina was acquired of waivers from the Chicago White Sox.
- August 9, 2007: Minor league player Sebastien Bouchier was acquired from the Seattle Mariners in exchange for John Parrish.
- August 9, 2007: Chris Gomez was acquired off waivers from the Baltimore Orioles by the Cleveland Indians.
- August 31, 2007: Steve Trachsel was acquired from the Chicago Cubs in exchange for Scott Moore and Rocky Cherry.
- September 5, 2007: Paul Shuey was released by the Baltimore Orioles.
- September 7, 2007: Víctor Santos was acquired from the Cincinnati Reds in exchange for cash.
- September 9, 2007: Víctor Zambrano was acquired from the Pittsburgh Pirates in exchange for cash.

=== Rangers 30, Orioles 3 ===
August 22, 2007 5:05 pm (ET) at Oriole Park at Camden Yards in Baltimore, Maryland 74 °F (23 °C), Wind 7 mph in from Leftfield
Team	1	2	3	4	5	6	7	8	9	R	H	E
Texas	0	0	0	5	0	9	0	10	6	30	29	1
Baltimore	1	0	2	0	0	0	0	0	0	3	9	1
WP: Kason Gabbard (6–1) LP: Daniel Cabrera (9–13) Sv: Wes Littleton (1); Home runs: TEX: Ramon Vazquez (2), Jarrod Saltalamacchia (2), Marlon Byrd (1), Travis Metcalf (1); BAL: None; Attendance: 21,828; Notes: Game 1 of Doubleheader, American League record for most runs scored in one game. Boxscore

On August 22 of the season, the Orioles were slated to play against the Texas Rangers in a doubleheader, as the two teams had their game on August 20 postponed due to rain. Both teams were well out of contention by this point, with the Rangers at 54-70 and the Orioles at 58–65, and it was the first game for manager Dave Trembley in a full-time capacity, as he had served as an interim manager since June 19.

Every batter for the Rangers recorded at least two hits, with eight of the nine batters reaching home plate to score twice (with the exception of Michael Young, who left in the seventh inning after scoring once); incidentally, every Oriole pitcher (four used) allowed at least six runs to score. Wes Littleton, who came in when the score was 14–3 in the seventh inning, received the save for his three innings of work; the offensive explosion of sixteen runs after he came in helped set a new record for the largest margin of victory in a game with a save, and the previous record was coincidentally a win by the Rangers over the Orioles (26–7, April 19, 1996).

The victory set a record for most runs scored by an American League team in one game while being the most runs scored by a team since the Chicago Colts in 1897 (who scored 36 against the Louisville Colonels on June 29); it was the ninth time a team had scored 30 runs in a game. The 29 hits were the most by a team in a game since August 28, 1992, when Milwaukee recorded 33 hits against Toronto. Less than an hour after the game, the two teams played the second game of the doubleheader, which the Rangers won 9–7.

=== Game log ===
2007 game log
April

#	Date	Opponent	Score	Win	Loss	Save	Attendance	Record
1	April 2	@ Twins	7 – 4	Santana (1–0)	Bédard (0–1)	Nathan (1)	48,711	0–1
2	April 3	@ Twins	3 – 2	Neshek (1–0)	Cabrera (0–1)	Nathan (2)	24,439	0–2
3	April 4	@ Twins	7 – 2	Ortiz (1–0)	Wright (0–1)		27,539	0–3
4	April 6	@ Yankees	6 – 4	Loewen (1–0)	Mussina (0–1)	Ray (1)	50,074	1–3
5	April 7	@ Yankees	10 – 7	Rivera (1–0)	Ray (0–1)		50,510	1–4
6	April 8	@ Yankees	6 – 4	Bédard (1-1)	Rasner (0–1)	Ray (2)	47,679	2–4
7	April 9	Tigers	6 – 2	Cabrera (1-1)	Durbin (0–1)		48,159	3–4
8	April 10	Tigers	3 – 1	Robertson (2–0)	Wright (0–2)	Jones (4)	18,594	3–5
9	April 11	Tigers	4 – 1 (12)	Ledezma (1–0)	Birkins (0–1)	Jones (5)	13,288	3–6
10	April 12	Royals	2 – 1 (10)	Ray (1-1)	Standridge (0–1)		13,229	4–6
11	April 13	Royals	8 – 1	Bédard (2–1)	Duckworth (0–1)		20,922	5–6
12	April 14	Royals	6 – 4	Williamson (1–0)	Jo. Peralta (0–1)	Ray (3)	15,244	6-6
--	April 15	Royals	Postponed (rain) Rescheduled for September 24					6-6
13	April 16	@ Devil Rays	9 – 7	Guthrie (1–0)	Ryu (1-1)	Ray (4)	9,157	7–6
14	April 17	@ Devil Rays	6 – 4	Fossum (1-1)	Trachsel (0–1)	Al Reyes (5)	9,575	7-7
15	April 18	@ Devil Rays	6 – 4	Bédard (3–1)	Glover (0–1)	Ray (5)	10,540	8–7
16	April 20	Blue Jays	5 – 4	Ray (2–1)	Zambrano (0–1)		25,025	9–7
17	April 21	Blue Jays	5 – 2	Loewen (2–0)	Towers (1–2)	Ray (6)	25,898	10–7
18	April 22	Blue Jays	7 – 3	Trachsel (1-1)	Chacín (2–1)		27,285	11–7
19	April 23	Athletics	6 – 5	Haren (2-2)	Bédard (3–2)	Street (5)	13,862	11–8
20	April 24	Athletics	4 – 2	Braden (1–0)	Guthrie (1-1)	Street (6)	14,452	11–9
21	April 25	Red Sox	6 – 1	Schilling (3–1)	Cabrera (1–2)		27,613	11–10
22	April 26	Red Sox	5 – 2	Beckett (5–0)	Ray (2-2)	Papelbon (7)	33,522	11-11
23	April 27	@ Indians	5 – 4	Westbrook (1–2)	Trachsel (1–2)	Borowski (9)	20,484	11–12
24	April 28	@ Indians	7 – 4	Walker (1–0)	Cabrera (1-1)	Ray (7)	25,065	12-12
25	April 29	@ Indians	6 – 1	Carmona (2–1)	Wright (0–3)		25,402	12–13
26	April 30	@ Tigers	8 – 4	Bonderman (1–0)	Cabrera (1–3)	Rodney (1)	24,914	12–14

May

#	Date	Opponent	Score	Win	Loss	Save	Attendance	Record
27	May 1	@ Tigers	5 – 4	Zumaya (1-1)	Báez (0–1)	Jones (9)	23,126	12–15
28	May 2	@ Tigers	3 – 2	Robertson (3–1)	Trachsel (1–3)	Jones (10)	29,278	12–16
29	May 4	Indians	3 – 2 (10)	Ray (3–2)	Mastny (2–1)		28,575	13–16
30	May 5	Indians	8 – 2	Cabrera (2–3)	Sowers (0–2)		25,752	14–16
31	May 6	Indians	9 – 6	Sabathia (5–0)	Burres (0–1)	Borowski (11)	37,464	14–17
32	May 7	Indians	10 – 1	Carmona (3–1)	Bradford (0–1)		17,944	14–18
33	May 8	Devil Rays	8 – 3	Guthrie (2–1)	Seo (1–3)		17,818	15–18
34	May 9	Devil Rays	1 – 0 (10)	Parrish (1–0)	Stokes (1–4)		14,780	16–18
35	May 10	Devil Rays	11 – 6	Cabrera (3-3)	Fossum (2–3)		15,915	17–18
36	May 11	@ Red Sox	6 – 3	Burres (1-1)	Tavárez (1–4)	Ray (8)	37,039	18-18
37	May 12	@ Red Sox	13 – 4	López (1–0)	Leicester (0–1)		36,503	18–19
38	May 13	@ Red Sox	6 – 5	Romero (1–0)	Ray (3-3)		36,379	18–20
39	May 14	@ Blue Jays	5 – 3	Janssen (1–0)	Báez (0–2)	Accardo (2)	19,819	18–21
40	May 15	@ Blue Jays	2 – 1	Litsch (1–0)	Cabrera (3–4)	Accardo (3)	30,958	18–22
41	May 16	@ Blue Jays	2 – 1	Burnett (4–3)	Burres (1–2)		24,339	18–23
42	May 18	@ Nationals	5 – 4	Trachsel (2–3)	Simontacchi (1–2)	Ray (9)	22,375	19–23
43	May 19	@ Nationals	3 – 2 (11)	Parrish (2–0)	Abreu (0–1)	Ray (10)	30,661	20–23
44	May 20	@ Nationals	4 – 3	Colomé (2–0)	Báez (0–3)	Cordero (5)	29,281	20–24
45	May 22	Blue Jays	6 – 4	Burnett (5–3)	Cabrera (3–5)	Accardo (4)	17,852	20–24
46	May 23	Blue Jays	5 – 2	Trachsel (3-3)	McGowan (0–2)	Ray (11)	16,938	21–25
47	May 24	Blue Jays	5 – 4 (10)	Janssen (2–0)	Báez (0–4)	Accardo (5)	15,182	21–26
48	May 25	Athletics	3 - 2	Haren (5–2)	Bédard (3-3)	Embree (2)	30,382	21–27
49	May 26	Athletics	8 – 3	Burres (2-2)	Kennedy (1–4)		29,194	22–27
50	May 27	Athletics	8 – 4	Cabrera (4–5)	Blanton (4–3)		30,140	23–27
51	May 28	@ Royals	9 – 1	Trachsel (4–3)	Elarton (1-1)		14,758	24–27
52	May 29	@ Royals	6 – 2	Guthrie (3–1)	de la Rosa (4–5)		13,556	25–27
53	May 30	@ Royals	3 – 0	Bédard (4–3)	Meche (3–4)	Ray (12)	10,513	26–27
54	May 31	@ Angels	6 – 2	Burres (3–2)	Escobar (6–3)		42,266	27-27

June

#	Date	Opponent	Score	Win	Loss	Save	Attendance	Record
55	June 1	@ Angels	3 – 2	Lackey (9–3)	Cabrera (4–6)	Rodríguez (19)	43,012	27–28
56	June 2	@ Angels	7 – 4	Saunders (3–0)	Trachsel (4-4)		42,190	27–29
57	June 3	@ Angels	4 – 3	Bootcheck (1–0)	Ray (3–4)		41,026	27–30
58	June 4	@ Mariners	5 – 4	Sherrill (2–0)	Bradford (0–2)	Putz (14)	19,090	27–31
59	June 5	@ Mariners	5 – 4	Davis (1–0)	Walker (1-1)	Putz (15)	19,287	27–32
60	June 6	@ Mariners	9 – 5	Cabrera (5–6)	Washburn (5-5)		29,010	28–32
61	June 8	Rockies	4 – 2	Trachsel (5–4)	Francis (5-5)	Ray (13)	22,375	29–32
62	June 9	Rockies	3 – 2 (10)	Affeldt (4–1)	Williams (0–1)	Fuentes (18)	27,320	29–33
63	June 10	Rockies	6 – 1	Hirsh (3–6)	Bédard (4-4)		34,784	29–34
64	June 12	Nationals	7 – 4	Bowie (3–2)	Cabrera (5–7)	Cordero (9)	21,151	29–35
65	June 13	Nationals	9 – 6 (11)	Traber (2–0)	Ray (3–5)	S. Rivera (3)	21,782	29–36
66	June 14	Nationals	3 – 1	Simontacchi (4-4)	Bradford (0–3)	Cordero (10)	20,770	29–37
67	June 15	D-backs	7 – 3	Slaten (3–0)	Williams (0–2)		26,174	29–38
68	June 16	D-backs	8 – 4	González (3–2)	Cabrera (5–8)		26,964	29–39
69	June 17	D-backs	6 – 4	Webb (7–4)	Bradford (0–4)	Valverde (22)	27,934	29–40
70	June 19	@ Padres	12 – 6	Peavy (9–1)	Trachsel (5-5)		38,181	29–41
71	June 20	@ Padres	7 – 1	Guthrie (4–1)	Germano (5–1)		26,931	30–41
72	June 21	@ Padres	6 – 3	Bédard (5–4)	Wells (3–5)		40,680	31–41
73	June 22	@ D-backs	7 – 1	Cabrera (6–8)	Webb (7–5)		21,722	32–41
74	June 23	@ D-backs	7 – 4	Cruz (3–1)	Bell (0–1)	Valverde (24)	29,832	32–42
75	June 24	@ D-backs	8 – 3	Davis (5–8)	Trachsel (5–6)		27,744	32–43
76	June 26	Yankees	3 – 2	Ray (4–5)	Proctor (1–5)		39,934	33–43
77	June 27	Yankees	4 – 0	Bédard (6–4)	Clemens (1–3)		35,776	34–43
78	June 28	Yankees	8 – 7*	Myers (1–0)	Parrish (2–1)	Rivera (10)	40,737	34–44
79	June 29	Angels	9 – 7	Shields (2-2)	Ray (4–6)	Rodríguez (23)	36,689	34–45
80	June 30	Angels	6 – 3	Burres (4–2)	Colón (6–4)	Shuey (1)	26,235	35–45
*Game suspended, completed July 27

July

#	Date	Opponent	Score	Win	Loss	Save	Attendance	Record
81	July 1	Angels	4 – 3	Lackey (11–6)	Guthrie (4–2)	Rodríguez (24)	25,058	35–46
82	July 2	@ White Sox	7 – 6	Bell (1-1)	Jenks (2–4)	Ray (14)	35,161	36–46
83	July 3	@ White Sox	5 – 1	Vázquez (5-5)	Cabrera (6–9)		37,281	36–47
84	July 4	@ White Sox	9 – 6	Bell (2–1)	Contreras (5–10)		33,640	37–47
85	July 5	@ White Sox	11 – 4	Danks (5–6)	Burres (4–3)		30,364	37–48
86	July 6	@ Rangers	4 – 3 (10)	Benoit (3–2)	Shuey (0–1)		24,035	37–49
87	July 7	@ Rangers	3 – 0	Bédard (7–4)	McCarthy (4–6)		32,849	38–49
88	July 8	@ Rangers	2 – 1	Millwood (6–7)	Cabrera (6–10)	Gagné (12)	22,843	38–50
89	July 12	White Sox	9 – 7	Garland (7–6)	Guthrie (4–3)	Jenks (24)	21,000	38–51
90	July 13	White Sox	2 – 0	Bédard (8–4)	Buehrle (6–5)	Ray (15)	28,162	39–51
91	July 14	White Sox	7 – 6 (10)	Ray (5–6)	Haeger (0–1)		29,208	40–51
92	July 15	White Sox	5 – 3	Olson (1–0)	Contreras (5–11)	Ray (16)	29,382	41–51
93	July 16	@ Mariners	4 – 2	Ramírez (5–2)	Burres (4-4)	Putz (27)	23,128	41–52
94	July 17	@ Mariners	8 – 3	Guthrie (5–3)	Hernández (6–5)		22,470	42–52
95	July 18	@ Mariners	6 – 5	Green (3–1)	Báez (0–5)	Putz (28)	28,550	42–53
96	July 20	@ Athletics	6 – 1	Bédard (9–4)	Blanton (8–7)		18,444	43–53
97	July 21	@ Athletics	4 – 3	Haren (11–3)	Trachsel (5–7)	Embree (10)	30,828	43–54
98	July 22	@ Athletics	2 – 0	Guthrie (6–3)	Braden (1–5)	Walker (1)	25,552	44–54
99	July 24	Devil Rays	3 – 0	Cabrera (7–10)	Kazmir (7-7)	Walker (2)	42,579	45–54
100	July 25	Devil Rays	6 – 1	Bédard (10–4)	Sonnanstine (1–6)		21,427	46–54
101	July 26	Devil Rays	10 – 7	Bell (3–1)	Jackson (2–10)		22,393	47–54
102	July 27	Yankees	4 – 2	Guthrie (7–3)	Pettitte (6–7)	Bradford (1)	47,952	48–54
103	July 28	Yankees	7 – 5	Burres (5–4)	Clemens (3–5)	Walker (3)	48,402	49–54
104	July 29	Yankees	10 – 6	Wang (12–5)	Cabrera (7–11)		47,936	49–55
105	July 31	@ Red Sox	5 – 3	Bédard (11–4)	Beckett (13–5)	Walker (4)	36,866	50–55

August

#	Date	Opponent	Score	Win	Loss	Save	Attendance	Record
106	August 1	@ Red Sox	5 – 4	López (2–1)	Parrish (2-2)	Papelbon (24)	36,649	50–56
107	August 2	@ Red Sox	7 – 4	Wakefield (13–9)	Bell (3–2)		36,457	50–57
108	August 3	@ Devil Rays	3 – 1	Cabrera (8–11)	Shields (8–7)	Báez (1)	15,542	51–57
109	August 4	@ Devil Rays	9 – 2	Kazmir (8–7)	Burres (5-5)		18,230	51–58
110	August 5	@ Devil Rays	11 – 3	Bédard (12–4)	Sonnanstine (1–7)		19,845	52–58
111	August 7	Mariners	10 – 3	Weaver (3–10)	Walker (1–2)		25,060	52–59
112	August 8	Mariners	8 – 4	Hernández (8–6)	Guthrie (7–4)	Putz (33)	17,511	52–60
113	August 9	Mariners	13 – 8	Ramírez (7–3)	Cabrera (8–12)	Sherrill (1)	18,679	52–61
114	August 10	Red Sox	6 – 5	Hoey (1–0)	Okajima (3–1)		48,993	53–61
115	August 11	Red Sox	6 – 2	Beckett (15–5)	Olson (1-1)	Papelbon (27)	49,242	53–62
116	August 12	Red Sox	6 – 3 (10)	Bradford (1–4)	Snyder (2–3)		48,551	54–62
117	August 13	@ Yankees	7 – 6	Rivera (3-3)	Bradford (1–5)		54,398	54–63
118	August 14	@ Yankees	12 – 0	Cabrera (9–12)	Karstens (0–3)		52,567	55–63
119	August 15	@ Yankees	6 – 3 (10)	Bradford (2–5)	Rivera (3–4)		53,363	56–63
120	August 17	@ Blue Jays	5 – 2	Burnett (7–6)	Olson (1–2)	Accardo (24)	25,524	56–64
121	August 18	@ Blue Jays	5 – 3	Trachsel (6–7)	Litsch (4–6)	Báez (2)	33,387	57–64
122	August 19	@ Blue Jays	3 – 2 (10)	Downs (2-2)	Bradford (2–6)		38,132	57–65
--	August 20	Rangers	Postponed (rain) Rescheduled for August 22					57–65
123	August 21	Rangers	6 – 2	Bédard (13–4)	Padilla (3–9)		18,926	58–65
124	August 22	Rangers	30 – 3	Gabbard (6–1)	Cabrera (3–9)	Littleton (1)	21,828	58–66
125	August 22	Rangers	9 – 7	Benoit (6–3)	Hoey (1-1)	Wilson (7)	21,828	58–67
126	August 23	Twins	5 – 2	Bonser (6–10)	Trachsel (6–8)	Guerrier (1)	19,389	58–68
127	August 24	Twins	7 – 4	Santana (14–9)	Hoey (1–2)	Nathan (28)	29,742	58–69
128	August 25	Twins	8 – 1	Garza (3–4)	Liz (0–1)		28,700	58–70
129	August 26	Twins	11 – 3	Baker (7–6)	Bédard (13–5)		30,876	58–71
130	August 28	Devil Rays	15 – 8	Dohmann (3–0)	Hoey (1–3)		17,781	58–72
131	August 29	Devil Rays	5 – 4 (12)	Balfour (1–2)	Bell (3-3)	Reyes (21)	16,944	58–73
132	August 30	Devil Rays	8 – 6	Kazmir (11–8)	Guthrie (7–5)	Reyes (22)	17,546	58–74
133	August 31	@ Red Sox	9 – 8	Birkins (1-1)	Tavárez (7–10)	Báez (3)	36,810	59–74

September

#	Date	Opponent	Score	Win	Loss	Save	Attendance	Record
134	September 1	@ Red Sox	10 – 0	Buchholz (2–0)	Olson (1–3)		36,819	59–75
135	September 2	@ Red Sox	3 – 2	Lester (3–0)	Cabrera (9–14)	Papelbon (31)	36,340	59–76
136	September 3	@ Devil Rays	9 – 7	Shields (11–8)	Hoey (1–4)		10,350	59–77
137	September 4	@ Devil Rays	8 – 4	Bradford (3–6)	Wheeler (1–7)		9,112	60–77
138	September 5	@ Devil Rays	17 – 2	Sonnanstine (5–9)	Liz (0–2)		9,856	60–78
139	September 6	Red Sox	7 – 6	Buchholz (3–0)	Báez (0–6)	Papelbon (34)	27,472	60–79
140	September 7	Red Sox	4 – 0	Lester (4–0)	Cabrera (9–15)		34,091	60–80
141	September 8	Red Sox	11 – 5	Leicester (1-1)	Matsuzaka (14–12)		48,043	61–80
142	September 9	Red Sox	3 – 2	Beckett (18–6)	Bradford (3–7)	Papelbon (35)	39,234	61–81
143	September 11	Angels	10 – 5	Saunders (8–3)	Santos (1–5)		15,371	61–82
144	September 12	Angels	18 – 6	Escobar (17–7)	Cabrera (9–16)		15,136	61–83
145	September 13	Angels	3 – 0	Leicester (2–1)	Lackey (16–9)	Walker (5)	16,359	62–83
146	September 14	@ Blue Jays	6 – 2	Burres (6–5)	Litsch (5–9)		31,106	63–83
147	September 15	@ Blue Jays	8 – 3	Halladay (15–7)	Birkins (1–2)		37,441	63–84
148	September 16	@ Blue Jays	8 – 6 (12)	Bell (4–3)	Frasor (1–5)	F. Cabrera (1)	38,934	64–84
149	September 17	@ Yankees	8 – 5	Hughes (4–3)	Cabrera (9–17)	Rivera (29)	52,548	64–85
150	September 18	@ Yankees	12 – 0	Mussina (10-10)	Leicester (2-2)		52,685	64–86
151	September 19	@ Yankees	2 – 1	Pettitte (14–8)	Burres (6-6)	Rivera (30)	53,857	64–87
152	September 20	@ Rangers	6 – 3	Walker (2-2)	Rheinecker (3-3)		20,136	65–87
153	September 21	@ Rangers	3 – 2	Mendoza (1–0)	Santos (1–6)	Benoit (6)	30,603	65–88
154	September 22	@ Rangers	11 – 9	Hoey (2–4)	Littleton (3–2)	Walker (6)	40,148	66–88
155	September 23	@ Rangers	3 – 0	Millwood (10–13)	Leicester (2–3)	Wilson (12)	37,812	66–89
156	September 24	Royals	3 – 2	Walker (3–2)	Meche (9–13)	Bradford (2)	15,769	67–89
157	September 25	Blue Jays	11 – 4	Burnett (10–7)	Burres (6–7)		15,867	67–90
158	September 26	Blue Jays	8 – 5	Halladay (16–7)	Zambrano (0–3)	Accardo (29)	15,424	67–91
159	September 27	Blue Jays	8 – 5	Hoey (3–4)	Tallet (2–4)	Walker (7)	15,817	68–91
160	September 28	Yankees	10 – 9 (10)	Bradford (4–7)	Ramírez (1-1)		38,113	69–91
161	September 29	Yankees	11 – 10	Pettitte (15–9)	Cabrera (9–15)	Veras (2)	47,616	69–92
162	September 30	Yankees	10 – 4	Wright (2–0)	Burres (6–8)		43,589	69–93

== Player stats ==
=== Batting ===
==== Starters by position ====
Note: Pos = Position; G = Games played; AB = At bats; H = Hits; Avg. = Batting average; HR = Home runs; RBI = Runs batted in

Pos	Player	G	AB	H	Avg.	HR	RBI
C	Ramón Hernández	106	364	94	.258	9	62
1B	Kevin Millar	140	476	121	.254	17	63
2B	Brian Roberts	156	621	180	.290	12	57
3B	Melvin Mora	126	467	128	.274	14	58
SS	Miguel Tejada	133	514	152	.296	18	81
RF	Nick Markakis	161	637	191	.300	23	112
CF	Corey Patterson	132	461	124	.269	8	45
LF	Jay Payton	131	434	111	.256	7	58
DH	Aubrey Huff	151	550	154	.280	15	72

==== Other batters ====
Note: G = Games played; AB = At bats; H = Hits; Avg. = Batting average; HR = Home runs; RBI = Runs batted in

Player	G	AB	H	Avg.	HR	RBI
Jay Gibbons	84	270	62	.230	6	28
Chris Gomez	73	169	51	.302	1	16
Paul Bako	60	156	32	.205	1	8
Tike Redman	40	132	42	.318	2	16
Freddie Bynum	70	96	25	.260	2	11
Luis Hernández	30	69	20	.290	1	7
Brandon Fahey	40	54	9	.167	0	1
JR House	19	38	8	.211	3	3
Scott Moore	17	42	12	.255	1	11
Alberto Castillo	11	31	5	.161	1	3
Jon Knott	7	14	3	.214	1	4
Gustavo Molina	7	9	2	.222	0	0
Adam Stern	2	0	0	----	0	0

=== Pitching ===
==== Starting pitchers ====
Note: G = Games pitched; IP = Innings pitched; W = Wins; L = Losses; ERA = Earned run average; SO = Strikeouts

Player	G	IP	W	L	ERA	SO
Daniel Cabrera	34	204.1	9	18	5.55	166
Érik Bédard	28	182.0	13	5	3.16	221
Jeremy Guthrie	32	175.1	7	5	3.70	123
Steve Trachsel	25	140.2	6	8	4.48	45

==== Other pitchers ====
Note: G = Games pitched; IP = Innings pitched; W = Wins; L = Losses; ERA = Earned run average; SO = Strikeouts

Player	G	IP	W	L	ERA	SO
Brian Burres	37	121.0	6	8	5.95	96
Jon Leicester	10	32.0	2	3	7.59	16
Garrett Olson	7	32.1	1	3	7.79	28
Adam Loewen	6	30.1	2	0	3.56	21
Víctor Santos	4	14.1	0	2	8.16	4
Jaret Wright	3	10.1	0	3	6.97	7

==== Relief pitchers ====
Note: G = Games pitched; IP = Inning pitched; SV = Saves; W = Wins; L = Losses; ERA = Earned run average; SO = Strikeouts

Player	G	W	L	SV	ERA	SO
Chris Ray	43	5	6	16	4.43	44
Jamie Walker	81	3	2	7	3.23	41
Chad Bradford	78	4	7	2	3.34	29
Danys Báez	53	0	6	3	6.44	29
John Parrish	45	2	2	0	5.40	36
Rob Bell	30	4	3	0	5.94	28
Paul Shuey	25	0	1	1	9.82	22
Jim Hoey	23	3	4	0	7.30	18
Kurt Birkins	19	1	2	0	8.13	30
Scott Williamson	16	1	0	0	4.40	16
Todd Williams	14	0	2	0	7.53	9
Rocky Cherry	10	0	0	0	7.71	10
Radhames Liz	9	0	2	0	6.93	24
Fernando Cabrera	7	0	0	1	12.60	9
Cory Doyne	5	0	0	0	14.73	2
Víctor Zambrano	5	0	1	0	9.49	11
Jim Johnson	1	0	0	0	9.00	1

==== Team leaders ====
===== Batting =====
Stat	Player	Total
Avg.	Nick Markakis	.300
HR	Nick Markakis	23
RBI	Nick Markakis	112
R	Brian Roberts	103
H	Nick Markakis	191
SB	Brian Roberts	50

===== Pitching =====
Stat	Player	Total
W	Érik Bédard	13
L	Daniel Cabrera	18
SV	Chris Ray	16
IP	Daniel Cabrera	204.1
ERA	Érik Bédard	3.16
SO	Érik Bédard	221

== Roster ==
2007 Baltimore Orioles
Roster
Pitchers: 28 Danys Báez; 45 Érik Bédard; 30 Rob Bell; 25 Kurt Birkins; 52,53 Chad Bradford; 56 Brian Burres; 35 Daniel Cabrera; 38 Rocky Cherry; 52 Cory Doyne; 46 Jeremy Guthrie; 39 Jim Hoey; 47 Jim Johnson; 52 Jon Leicester; 58 Radhames Liz; 57 Garrett Olson; 36 John Parrish; 37 Chris Ray; 51 Víctor Santos; 23 Paul Shuey; 41 Steve Trachsel; 32 Jamie Walker; 53 Todd Williams; 51 Scott Williamson; 27 Jaret Wright; 41 Víctor Zambrano	Catchers: 9 Paul Bako; 18 Alberto Castillo; 55 Ramón Hernández; 40 J. R. House; 63 Gustavo Molina; Infielders: 12 Brandon Fahey; 14 Chris Gomez; 2 Luis Hernández; 19 Aubrey Huff; 15 Kevin Millar; 43 Scott Moore; 6 Melvin Mora; 1 Brian Roberts; 10 Miguel Tejada	Outfielders: 3,42 Freddie Bynum; 31 Jay Gibbons; 39,2 Jon Knott; 21 Nick Markakis; 17,42 Corey Patterson; 16 Jay Payton; 13 Tike Redman; 40,67 Adam Stern	Manager: 2 Sam Perlozzo; 41 Dave Trembley; Coaches: 48 Terry Crowley (hitting); 36 Alan Dunn (bullpen); 54 Leo Mazzone (pitching); 50 Sam Mejías (first base); 11 Juan Samuel (third base); 26 Tom Trebelhorn (bench)

== Farm system ==
Level	Team	League	Manager
AAA	Norfolk Tides	International League	Gary Allenson
AA	Bowie Baysox	Eastern League	Bien Figueroa
A	Frederick Keys	Carolina League	Tommy Thompson
A	Delmarva Shorebirds	South Atlantic League	Gary Kendall
A-Short Season	Aberdeen IronBirds	New York–Penn League	Andy Etchebarren
Rookie	Bluefield Orioles	Appalachian League	Alex Arias

LEAGUE CHAMPIONS: Frederick
