= 2006 Baltimore Orioles season =

Major League Baseball season

2006 Baltimore Orioles
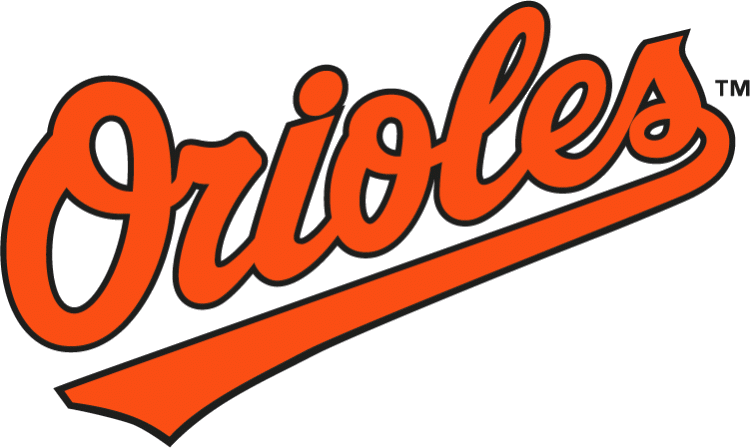
- League: American League
- Division: East
- Ballpark: Oriole Park at Camden Yards
- City: Baltimore
- Record: 70–92 (.432)
- Divisional place: 4th
- Owners: Peter Angelos
- General managers: Mike Flanagan
- Managers: Sam Perlozzo
- Television: WJZ-TV; WNUV; Comcast SportsNet (Jim Palmer, Jim Hunter, Buck Martinez, Fred Manfra)
- Radio: WBAL (AM) (Fred Manfra, Jim Hunter, Joe Angel)

The 2006 Baltimore Orioles season was the 106th season in Baltimore Orioles franchise history, the 53rd in Baltimore, and the 15th at Oriole Park at Camden Yards. They failed to improve on their 74–88 (.457) record from the previous year with a 70–92 record, and missed the postseason for the 9th straight season.

== Offseason ==
=== Front office changes ===
Following the disappointing 2005 season, it was clear major changes needed to be made within the Orioles. In the front office, Executive VP Jim Beattie was not re-signed, allowing Mike Flanagan to become the sole GM of the Orioles. Shortly after, Jim Duquette was hired as Vice President of Baseball Operations, which was Flanagan's previous position. Duquette made it clear at his signing that he reported to Flanagan, so the "two-headed GM" did not exist anymore. The Orioles also fired Assistant General Manager Ed Kenney and asked for the resignation of Dave Ritterpusch, Director of Baseball Information Systems.

=== Coaching staff changes ===
There were also drastic changes in the Orioles coaching staff. Perlozzo was named the new manager, and unlike Mazzilli, was given full freedom to name his coaching staff. Sam Perlozzo led off strong by convincing Atlanta pitching coach Leo Mazzone, who had revolutionized the careers of many pitchers in Atlanta, to become the pitching coach for the Orioles. He retained hitting coach Terry Crowley and first base coach Dave Cash. Former base coach and 1983 World Series MVP Rick Dempsey replaced Elrod Hendricks as the bullpen coach, with Tom Trebelhorn resuming third base coach. Perlozzo rounded out his staff with former Cubs and Phillies manager Lee Elia as the bench coach.

=== Roster changes ===
The roster changes of 2005 were prefaced with Peter Angelos' comments: "We are coming back strong next year. I know you have heard that tune before, but this time it will literally come true." The Orioles allowed Rafael Palmeiro, Sammy Sosa, and B.J. Surhoff to become free agents. They also set their wishlist: An everyday first baseman, an experienced starter, a closer, a defensive catcher, outfield help, more defense, and more speed. However, their offseason moves showed no differences from past years. The Orioles were not able to re-sign closer B. J. Ryan, who signed a landmark deal with the Toronto Blue Jays. They were also locked out in bids to sign first baseman Paul Konerko, outfielder Johnny Damon, and starter Paul Byrd. The Orioles chose not to enter the bidding for players like A. J. Burnett and Kevin Millwood, whose asking prices were far beyond what the Orioles were willing to pay, but they did sign catcher Ramón Hernández.

Locked out of pursuits to sign top-tier players, the Orioles decided to make several moves to allow minor league prospects more time to develop. This led to bringing in players like Jeff Conine and Kevin Millar, both of whom are known for their positive presence in the clubhouse. On February 4, 2006, Ricky Bottalico was signed as a free agent with the Baltimore Orioles. The Orioles also made several trades to bring in needed players. They first traded disgruntled reliever Steve Kline for LaTroy Hawkins, then traded for outfielder Corey Patterson, who brought speed and defense to the outfield, and traded former closer Jorge Julio and John Maine for experienced starter Kris Benson. The Orioles also addressed future free agents by extending the contract of outfielder Jay Gibbons and third baseman Melvin Mora, and recently signed a contract extension with second baseman Brian Roberts. The team's Opening Day roster featured top prospect Nick Markakis, a potential A.L. "Rookie of the Year", the best young position player the Orioles' farm system has produced since Brian Roberts. Markakis represents the revival of the Orioles' farm system, which features four players listed in Baseball America's 2006 list of the top 100 prospects in minor league baseball.

== Regular season ==
=== Season standings ===
AL East
| Team | W | L | Pct. | GB | Home | Road |
|---|---|---|---|---|---|---|
| New York Yankees | 97 | 65 | .599 | — | 50‍–‍31 | 47‍–‍34 |
| Toronto Blue Jays | 87 | 75 | .537 | 10 | 50‍–‍31 | 37‍–‍44 |
| Boston Red Sox | 86 | 76 | .531 | 11 | 48‍–‍33 | 38‍–‍43 |
| Baltimore Orioles | 70 | 92 | .432 | 27 | 40‍–‍41 | 30‍–‍51 |
| Tampa Bay Devil Rays | 61 | 101 | .377 | 36 | 41‍–‍40 | 20‍–‍61 |

=== Record vs. opponents ===
2006 American League record Source: MLB Standings Grid – 2006
| Team | BAL | BOS | CWS | CLE | DET | KC | LAA | MIN | NYY | OAK | SEA | TB | TEX | TOR | NL |
|---|---|---|---|---|---|---|---|---|---|---|---|---|---|---|---|
| Baltimore | — | 3–15 | 2–5 | 4–2 | 3–3 | 5–1 | 4–6 | 3–6 | 7–12 | 2–4 | 4–6 | 13–6 | 3–6 | 8–11 | 9–9 |
| Boston | 15–3 | — | 4–2 | 3–4 | 3–3 | 4–5 | 3–3 | 1–5 | 8–11 | 3–7 | 4–6 | 10–9 | 5–4 | 7–12 | 16–2 |
| Chicago | 5–2 | 2–4 | — | 8–11 | 12–7 | 11–8 | 6–3 | 9–10 | 2–4 | 3–3 | 5–4 | 3–3 | 5–5 | 5–4 | 14–4 |
| Cleveland | 2–4 | 4–3 | 11–8 | — | 6–13 | 10–8 | 4–5 | 8–11 | 3–4 | 3–6 | 4–5 | 6–1 | 5–4 | 4–2 | 8–10 |
| Detroit | 3–3 | 3–3 | 7–12 | 13–6 | — | 14–4 | 3–5 | 11–8 | 2–5 | 5–4 | 6–3 | 5–3 | 5–5 | 3–3 | 15–3 |
| Kansas City | 1–5 | 5–4 | 8–11 | 8–10 | 4–14 | — | 3–7 | 7–12 | 2–7 | 4–5 | 3–5 | 1–5 | 3–3 | 3–4 | 10–8 |
| Los Angeles | 6–4 | 3–3 | 3–6 | 5–4 | 5–3 | 7–3 | — | 4–2 | 6–4 | 11–8 | 10–9 | 7–2 | 11–8 | 4–6 | 7–11 |
| Minnesota | 6–3 | 5–1 | 10–9 | 11–8 | 8–11 | 12–7 | 2–4 | — | 3–3 | 6–4 | 5–3 | 6–1 | 4–5 | 2–5 | 16–2 |
| New York | 12–7 | 11–8 | 4–2 | 4–3 | 5–2 | 7–2 | 4–6 | 3–3 | — | 3–6 | 3–3 | 13–5 | 8–2 | 10–8 | 10–8 |
| Oakland | 4–2 | 7–3 | 3–3 | 6–3 | 4–5 | 5–4 | 8–11 | 4–6 | 6–3 | — | 17–2 | 6–3 | 9–10 | 6–4 | 8–10 |
| Seattle | 6–4 | 6–4 | 4–5 | 5–4 | 3–6 | 5–3 | 9–10 | 3–5 | 3–3 | 2–17 | — | 6–3 | 8–11 | 4–5 | 14–4 |
| Tampa Bay | 6–13 | 9–10 | 3–3 | 1–6 | 3–5 | 5–1 | 2–7 | 1–6 | 5–13 | 3–6 | 3–6 | — | 3–6 | 6–12 | 11–7 |
| Texas | 6–3 | 4–5 | 5–5 | 4–5 | 5–5 | 3–3 | 8–11 | 5–4 | 2–8 | 10–9 | 11–8 | 6–3 | — | 4–2 | 7–11 |
| Toronto | 11–8 | 12–7 | 4–5 | 2–4 | 3–3 | 4–3 | 6–4 | 5–2 | 8–10 | 4–6 | 5–4 | 12–6 | 2–4 | — | 9–9 |

=== Roster ===
2006 Baltimore Orioles
Roster
| Pitchers: 40 Winston Abreu; 45 Érik Bédard; 34 Kris Benson; 25 Kurt Birkins; 52 Chris Britton; 38 Jim Brower; 56 Brian Burres; 40 Tim Byrdak; 35 Daniel Cabrera; 27 Bruce Chen; 28 Eric DuBose; 50 John Halama; 23,32 LaTroy Hawkins; 47 Jim Hoey; 47 Jim Johnson; 13 Rodrigo López; 57 Julio Manon; 30 Russ Ortiz; 49 Hayden Penn; 37 Chris Ray; 43 Sendy Rleal; 50 Eddy Rodríguez; 53 Todd Williams | Catchers: 55 Danny Ardoin; 9,36 Raúl Chávez; 55 Ramón Hernández; 18 Javy López; 18 Chris Widger; Infielders: 52 Howie Clark; 19 Jeff Conine; 14 Chris Gomez; 15 Kevin Millar; 6 Melvin Mora; 1 Brian Roberts; 23 Fernando Tatís; 10 Miguel Tejada | Outfielders: 12 Brandon Fahey; 16 Jeff Fiorentino; 31 Jay Gibbons; 21 Nick Markakis; 32 Luis Matos; 11 David Newhan; 17 Corey Patterson; 16 Ed Rogers; 28 Luis Terrero | Manager: 2 Sam Perlozzo; Coaches: 30 Dave Cash (first base); 48 Terry Crowley (hitting); 24 Rick Dempsey (bullpen); 3 Lee Elia (bench); 54 Leo Mazzone (pitching); 26 Tom Trebelhorn (third base) |

=== Beltway Series ===
During spring training in 2006, the Nationals and Orioles played each other in Washington on March 31 and in Baltimore on April 1. The first match up of the Beltway Series rivalry took place on May 19, 2006, during the 2006 regular season; the Orioles won at RFK Stadium. This marked first time in 35 years that the Orioles played a regular-season game in Washington, as they played the Washington Senators, another team in the American League annually from 1954 to 1960. The Orioles continued that rivalry with the new Washington Senators from 1961 to 1971.

The two teams split the season series 3–3 with each time winning two games at home and one on the road.

== Player stats ==
=== Batting ===
==== Starters by position ====
Note: Pos = Position; G = Games played; AB = At bats; H = Hits; Avg. = Batting average; HR = Home runs; RBI = Runs batted in

| Pos | Player | G | AB | H | Avg. | HR | RBI |
|---|---|---|---|---|---|---|---|
| C | Ramón Hernández | 144 | 501 | 138 | .275 | 23 | 91 |
| 1B | Kevin Millar | 132 | 430 | 117 | .272 | 15 | 64 |
| 2B | Brian Roberts | 138 | 563 | 161 | .286 | 10 | 55 |
| SS | Miguel Tejada | 162 | 648 | 214 | .330 | 24 | 100 |
| 3B | Melvin Mora | 155 | 624 | 171 | .274 | 16 | 83 |
| LF | Jeff Conine | 114 | 389 | 103 | .265 | 9 | 49 |
| CF | Corey Patterson | 135 | 463 | 128 | .276 | 16 | 53 |
| RF | Nick Markakis | 147 | 491 | 143 | .291 | 16 | 62 |
| DH | Javy López | 76 | 279 | 74 | .265 | 8 | 31 |

==== Other batters ====
Note: G = Games played; AB = At bats; H = Hits; Avg. = Batting average; HR = Home runs; RBI = Runs batted in

| Player | G | AB | H | Avg. | HR | RBI |
|---|---|---|---|---|---|---|
| Jay Gibbons | 90 | 343 | 95 | .277 | 13 | 46 |
| Brandon Fahey | 91 | 251 | 59 | .235 | 2 | 23 |
| Chris Gomez | 55 | 132 | 45 | .341 | 2 | 17 |
| David Newhan | 39 | 131 | 33 | .252 | 4 | 18 |
| Luis Matos | 55 | 121 | 25 | .207 | 2 | 5 |
| Fernando Tatis | 28 | 56 | 14 | .250 | 2 | 8 |
| Luis Terrero | 27 | 40 | 8 | .200 | 1 | 6 |
| Jeff Fiorentino | 19 | 39 | 10 | .256 | 0 | 7 |
| Raúl Chávez | 16 | 28 | 5 | .179 | 0 | 0 |
| Ed Rogers | 17 | 25 | 5 | .200 | 0 | 2 |
| Chris Widger | 9 | 17 | 2 | .118 | 0 | 2 |
| Danny Ardoin | 5 | 13 | 1 | .077 | 0 | 1 |
| Howie Clark | 7 | 7 | 1 | .143 | 0 | 0 |

=== Pitching ===
==== Starting pitchers ====
Note: G = Games pitched; IP = Innings pitched; W = Wins; L = Losses; ERA = Earned run average; SO = Strikeouts

| Player | G | IP | W | L | ERA | SO |
|---|---|---|---|---|---|---|
| Érik Bédard | 33 | 196.1 | 15 | 11 | 3.76 | 171 |
| Rodrigo López | 36 | 189.0 | 9 | 18 | 5.90 | 136 |
| Kris Benson | 30 | 183.0 | 11 | 12 | 4.82 | 88 |
| Daniel Cabrera | 26 | 148.0 | 9 | 10 | 4.74 | 157 |
| Adam Loewen | 22 | 112.1 | 6 | 6 | 5.37 | 98 |
| Hayden Penn | 6 | 19.2 | 0 | 4 | 15.10 | 8 |
| Jim Johnson | 1 | 3.0 | 0 | 1 | 24.00 | 0 |

==== Other pitchers ====
Note: G = Games pitched; IP = Innings pitched; W = Wins; L = Losses; ERA = Earned run average; SO = Strikeouts

| Player | G | IP | W | L | ERA | SO |
|---|---|---|---|---|---|---|
| Bruce Chen | 40 | 98.2 | 0 | 7 | 6.93 | 70 |
| Russ Ortiz | 20 | 40.1 | 0 | 3 | 8.48 | 23 |

==== Relief pitchers ====
Note: G = Games pitched; W = Wins; L = Losses; SV = Saves; ERA = Earned run average; SO = Strikeouts

| Player | G | W | L | SV | ERA | SO |
|---|---|---|---|---|---|---|
| Chris Ray | 61 | 4 | 4 | 33 | 2.73 | 51 |
| Todd Williams | 62 | 2 | 4 | 1 | 4.74 | 24 |
| LaTroy Hawkins | 60 | 3 | 2 | 0 | 4.48 | 27 |
| Chris Britton | 52 | 0 | 2 | 1 | 3.35 | 41 |
| Sendy Rleal | 42 | 1 | 1 | 0 | 4.44 | 19 |
| Kurt Birkins | 35 | 5 | 2 | 0 | 4.94 | 27 |
| Julio Mañón | 22 | 0 | 1 | 0 | 5.40 | 22 |
| John Halama | 17 | 3 | 1 | 0 | 6.14 | 12 |
| Tim Byrdak | 16 | 1 | 0 | 0 | 12.86 | 2 |
| Jim Brower | 12 | 0 | 1 | 0 | 13.86 | 9 |
| Jim Hoey | 12 | 0 | 1 | 0 | 10.24 | 6 |
| Brian Burres | 11 | 0 | 0 | 0 | 2.25 | 6 |
| Eddy Rodríguez | 9 | 1 | 1 | 0 | 7.20 | 11 |
| Winston Abreu | 7 | 0 | 0 | 0 | 10.13 | 6 |
| Eric DuBose | 2 | 0 | 0 | 0 | 9.64 | 2 |

== Farm system ==
| Level | Team | League | Manager |
|---|---|---|---|
| AAA | Ottawa Lynx | International League | Dave Trembley |
| AA | Bowie Baysox | Eastern League | Don Werner |
| A | Frederick Keys | Carolina League | Bien Figueroa |
| A | Delmarva Shorebirds | South Atlantic League | Gary Kendall |
| A-Short Season | Aberdeen IronBirds | New York–Penn League | Andy Etchebarren |
| Rookie | Bluefield Orioles | Appalachian League | Gary Allenson |

LEAGUE CHAMPIONS: Frederick
