= Dave Trembley =

American baseball coach and manager (born 1951)

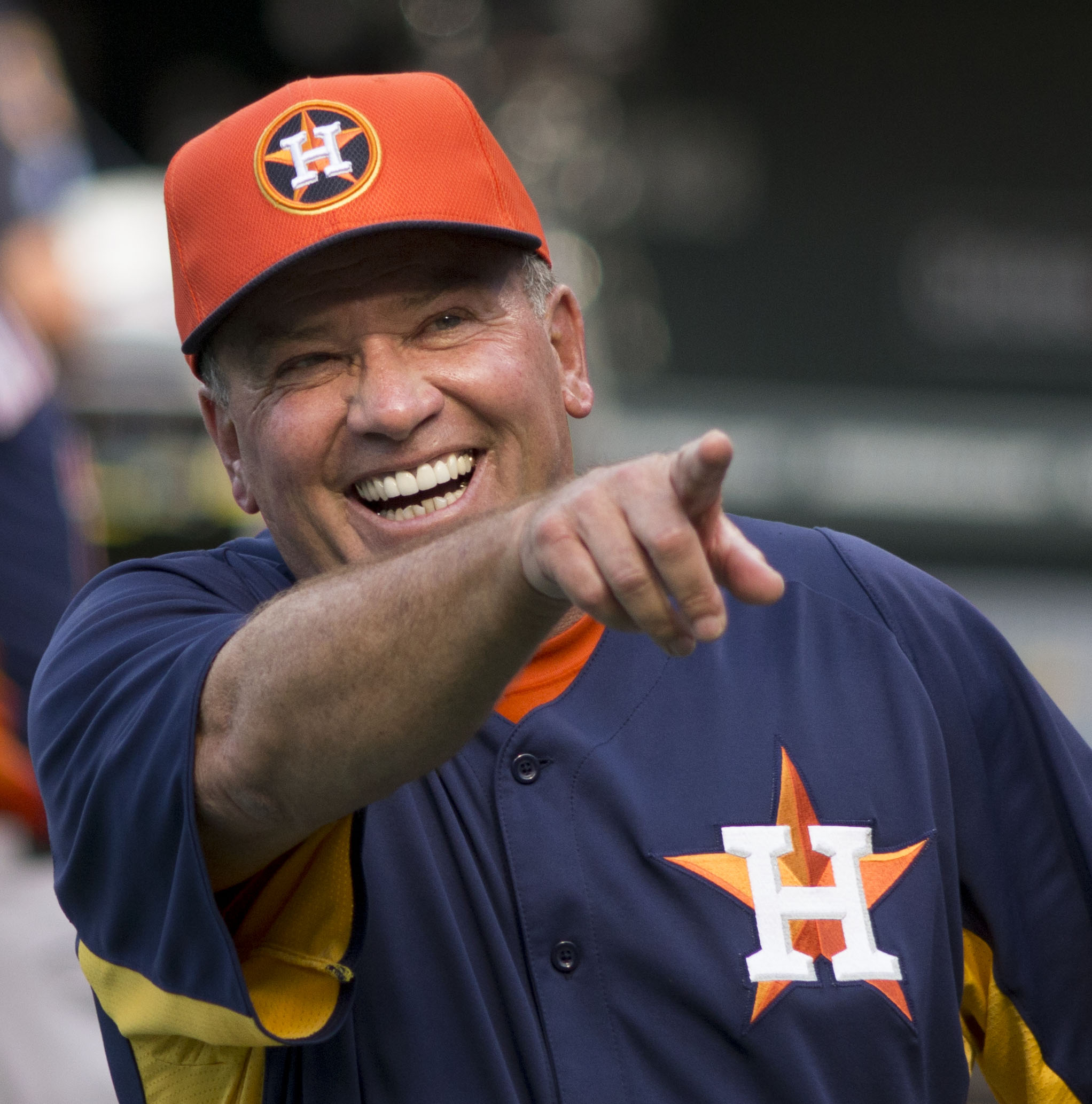
- Trembley with the Houston Astros in 2013
- Coach / Manager
- Born: October 31, 1951 (age 74); Carthage, New York, U.S.

MLB statistics
- Games: 470
- Win–loss record: 187–283
- Winning %: .398
- Stats at Baseball Reference
- Managerial record at Baseball Reference

Teams
- As manager: Baltimore Orioles (2007–2010); State College Spikes (2022–2023) (2026); As coach: Baltimore Orioles (2007); Houston Astros (2013–2014)

David Michael Trembley (born October 31, 1951) is an American professional baseball coach, manager, and executive who recently served as the director of player development for the Atlanta Braves of Major League Baseball (MLB) in 2015. Trembley has been the bench coach for the Houston Astros and a manager of the Baltimore Orioles. Before managing the Orioles, Trembley was a minor league manager for twenty seasons, compiling a 1,369–1,413 record. He won two league titles and earned Manager of the Year awards in three leagues. In December 2001, Baseball America selected him as one of minor league baseball's top five managers of the previous 20 years. He served as a coach in the inaugural Futures Game in 1999 and also served as manager for the Southern League and Double-A All-Star Games that season. Trembley has worked for the Baltimore Orioles, Chicago Cubs, Pittsburgh Pirates, San Diego Padres and Atlanta Braves.

== Coaching career ==
He began his career in professional baseball as a Los Angeles-area scout for the Chicago Cubs in 1984. The next season, he became an instructor in the Cubs minor league system until June, when he was named to coach at their Wytheville club in the Appalachian League. Trembley left the Cubs organization to embark on his managing career with the unaffiliated Kinston Eagles franchise of the Class A Carolina League in 1986. It began a stretch in which he would manage in the minors in 20 of the ensuing 21 years (the lone exception being the 1990 season).

Trembley joined the Baltimore Orioles organization after he was named manager of the Bowie Baysox on January 27, 2003. His hiring was part of the Orioles' plan to improve its underachieving farm system with an emphasis on fundamentals and discipline. Taking over a ballclub that had ended its previous three seasons in or below fifth place in the Eastern League's Southern Division, he led the Baysox to fourth at 69–72 in 2003. The 13 1/2-game improvement earned him the organization's Cal Ripken, Sr. Player Development Award. The only Orioles affiliate to post a winning record in 2004, the Baysox finished above .500 for the first time since 1997 at 73–69. Trembley achieved his 1,200th victory as a minor-league manager during that campaign in a win over the Binghamton Mets on July 9. He managed the Eastern League All-Star Team that season (2004). He moved up to the Ottawa Lynx in a similar capacity on December 2, 2004. Trembley managed the Orioles' AAA team, the Ottawa Lynx, in 2005 and 2006, combining to go 143–144.

Trembley was promoted to Baltimore's major league coaching staff when he was named the team's bullpen coach on February 14, 2007.

=== Orioles manager ===
Trembley was named interim manager of the Orioles following Sam Perlozzo's dismissal on June 18, 2007. He inherited a 29–40 ballclub that was mired in last place in the American League (AL) East and in the midst of an eight-game losing streak. As a result of a 29–25 stretch, he had the interim tag removed from his title as his contract was extended through the 2008 season on August 22. Later that same night, the Orioles began a nine-game losing streak by surrendering the most runs ever in an AL contest in a 30–3 defeat to the Texas Rangers in the first game of a twi-night doubleheader at Camden Yards. The team avoided last place in the AL East despite losing 28 of its last 39 contests.

The Orioles exercised their option on Trembley's contract through the 2009 season on September 5, 2008, even though they were in last place at 63–76. They finished at the bottom of the division this time by dropping 17 of its final 22 games, including ten in a row. His contract was similarly extended again a year later on October 2, 2009, despite another last-place finish, a worse record and a 24–50 performance after the All-Star break. The moves were made because the team was in a rebuilding phase, and it was hoped that his emphasis on fundamentals would help the development of its young players.

With the Orioles still stuck in last place in the AL East with a major-league-worst 15–39 record and an eight-game losing streak, Trembley was fired on June 4, 2010 and replaced by third-base coach Juan Samuel. The ballclub's 2–16 start was the second worst in franchise history. They were also stricken by a rash of injuries and the lowest run production in the majors a third into the campaign. Trembley had become a target for increasing criticism from fans who felt his disciplinary approach was too soft and that he mishandled the bullpen. Details of the latter included overworking his relief pitchers and putting them in situations to fail. His tenure lasted just under three years with a 187–283 record.

=== Post-Baltimore ===
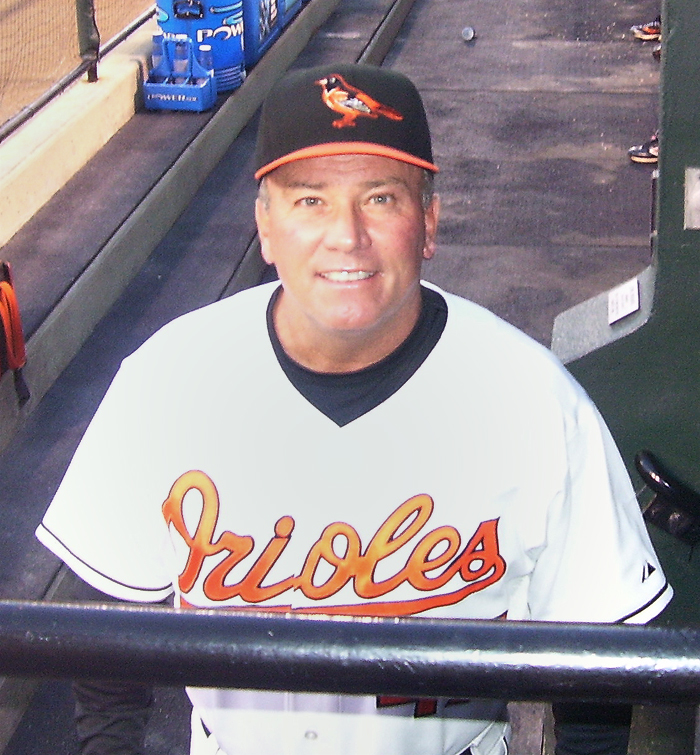
Trembley with Baltimore in 2007.

Trembley was the minor league field coordinator for the Atlanta Braves during the 2011 and 2012 seasons. On October 19, 2012, Trembley was announced to be a member of the 2013 Houston Astros coaching staff. Later that year, it was announced Trembley would be the third base coach. Trembley was relieved of his duties as the Houston Astros bench coach on September 1, 2014, and rejoined the Braves as director of player development/Field Coordinator in October 2014. In May 2021 Trembley was named the Manager by MLB/USA Baseball to Manage at Bristol, Va. in the Appalachian League. In March 2022, Trembley was named manager of the State College Spikes, a collegiate summer baseball team of the MLB Draft League based in State College, Pennsylvania. In February 2026, Trembley was rehired as the manager of the State College Spikes after his previous tenure ended with a 23-24 record in 2023.

== Managerial record ==
As of June 4, 2010

Team	Year	Regular season					Postseason			
Team	Year	Games	Won	Lost	Win %	Finish	Won	Lost	Win %	Result
BAL	2007	93	40	53	.430	4th in AL East	–	–	–	–
BAL	2008	161	68	93	.422	5th in AL East	–	–	–	–
BAL	2009	162	64	98	.395	5th in AL East	–	–	–	–
BAL	2010	54	15	39	.278	Fired	–	–	–	–
Total		470	187	283	.398		0	0	–	

Sporting positions
Preceded by first manager	Kinston Eagles Manager; 1986	Succeeded by last manager
Preceded by first manager	Harrisburg Senators Manager; 1987–1989	Succeeded by Marc Bombard
Preceded by Tommy Jones	Orlando Cubs Manager; 1994	Succeeded by Bruce Kimm
Preceded by Ken Bolek	Daytona Cubs Manager; 1995–1996	Succeeded by Steve Roadcap
Preceded by Bruce Kimm	Orlando Cubs Manager; 1997	Succeeded by last manager
Preceded by first manager	West Tenn Diamond Jaxx Manager; 1998–1999	Succeeded by Dave Bialas
Preceded by Terry Kennedy	Iowa Cubs Manager; 2000	Succeeded by Bruce Kimm
Preceded by Richie Zisk	Daytona Cubs Manager; 2001–2002	Succeeded by Rick Kranitz
Preceded by Dave Stockstill	Bowie Baysox Manager; 2003–2004	Succeeded by Don Werner
Preceded by Tim Leiper	Ottawa Lynx Manager; 2005–2006	Succeeded by John Russell
Preceded by Rick Dempsey	Baltimore Orioles Bullpen Coach; 2007	Succeeded by Alan Dunn
Preceded by Dave Clark	Houston Astros Third Base Coach; 2013	Succeeded by Pat Listach
Preceded by Eduardo Pérez	Houston Astros Bench Coach; 2014	Succeeded by Trey Hillman
