= Luis Hernández (baseball) =

Venezuelan baseball player (born 1984)

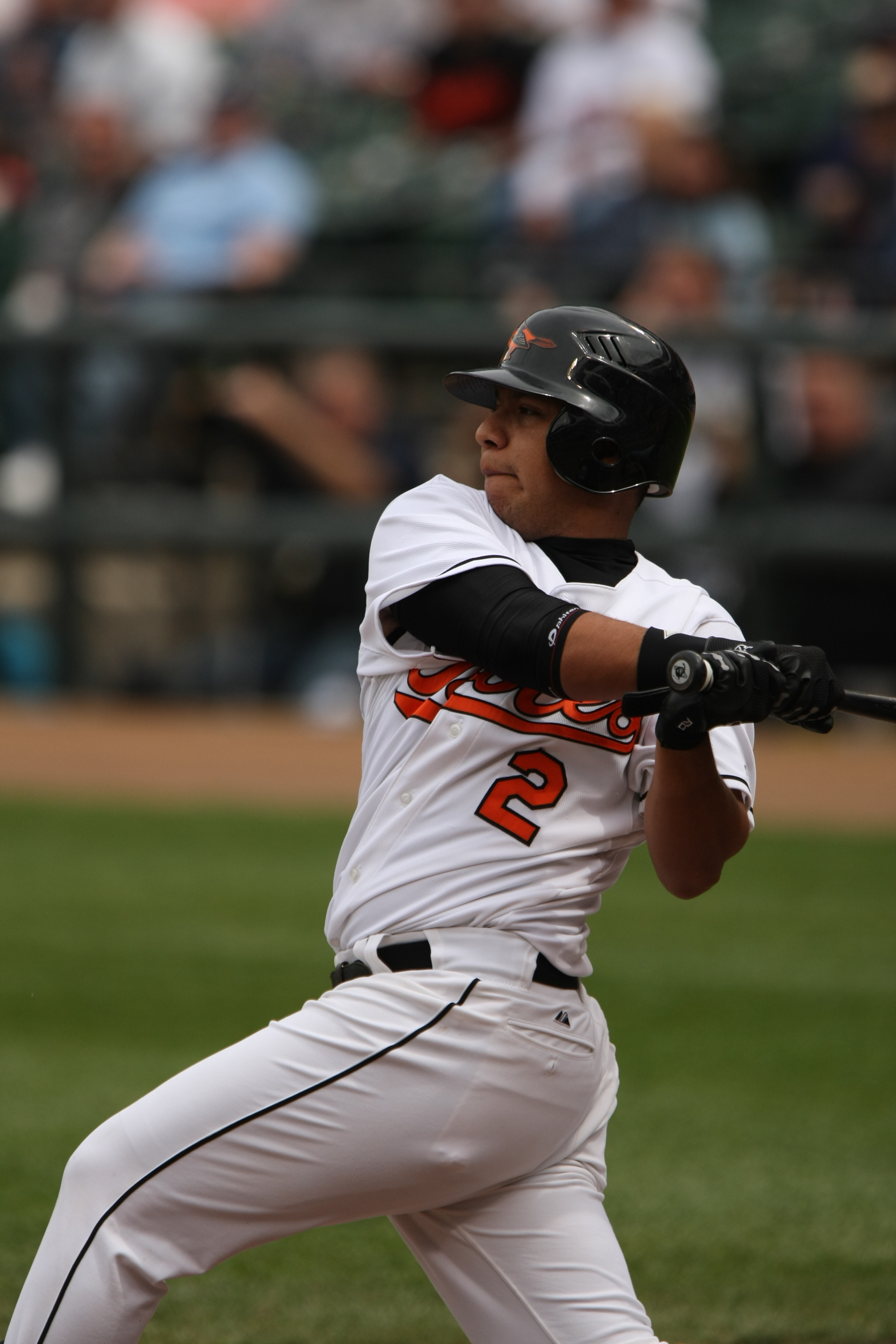
- Hernández with the Baltimore Orioles in 2008
- Shortstop
- Born: June 26, 1984 (age 42); Quíbor, Lara, Venezuela
- Batted: Switch Threw: Right

MLB debut
- July 8, 2007, for the Baltimore Orioles

Last MLB appearance
- August 26, 2012, for the Texas Rangers

MLB statistics
- Batting average: .243
- Home runs: 3
- Runs batted in: 20
- Stats at Baseball Reference

Teams
- Baltimore Orioles (2007–2008); Kansas City Royals (2009); New York Mets (2010); Texas Rangers (2012)

Luís Andres Hernández Mendoza (born June 26, 1984) is a Venezuelan former professional baseball shortstop. He played in Major League Baseball (MLB) for the Baltimore Orioles, Kansas City Royals, New York Mets and Texas Rangers.

== Career ==
=== Atlanta Braves ===
Hernández was signed as a non-drafted free agent by the Atlanta Braves on September 16, 2000. He spent five seasons in the Braves' minor league organization, but only played 19 games for their AAA affiliate, the Richmond Braves, before moving to Baltimore.

=== Baltimore Orioles ===
Hernández was claimed off waivers by the Baltimore Orioles on October 12, 2006. He made his major league debut for the Orioles as a late-inning defensive replacement July 8, 2007 against the Texas Rangers. Hernández collected his first major league hit, a double, in his second career game on July 12, 2007 against the Chicago White Sox at Oriole Park at Camden Yards. Hernández got his hit, a line drive to center field, off of the first pitch he saw from White Sox relief pitcher Dewon Day in the bottom of the ninth inning. He also got his first major league RBI on the play, as Jay Gibbons came in to score. His first major league home run was hit on September 27, 2007 against the Toronto Blue Jays.

Hernández was penciled in as the Orioles' starting shortstop for the 2008 season, but faced Spring Training competition from Brandon Fahey. Considered an "all-defense" player, Hernández and Fahey vied for the position vacated by Miguel Tejada, who was traded to the Houston Astros over the offseason. He became a free agent at the end of the season.

=== Kansas City Royals ===
In November 2008, Hernández signed a minor league deal with the Kansas City Royals. He added to the major league roster on May 3, 2009 after Tony Peña Jr.was placed on the disabled list. On July 6, 2009, he was designated for assignment to make room for the newly acquired Ryan Freel. Hernández was released on January 19, 2010.

=== New York Mets ===
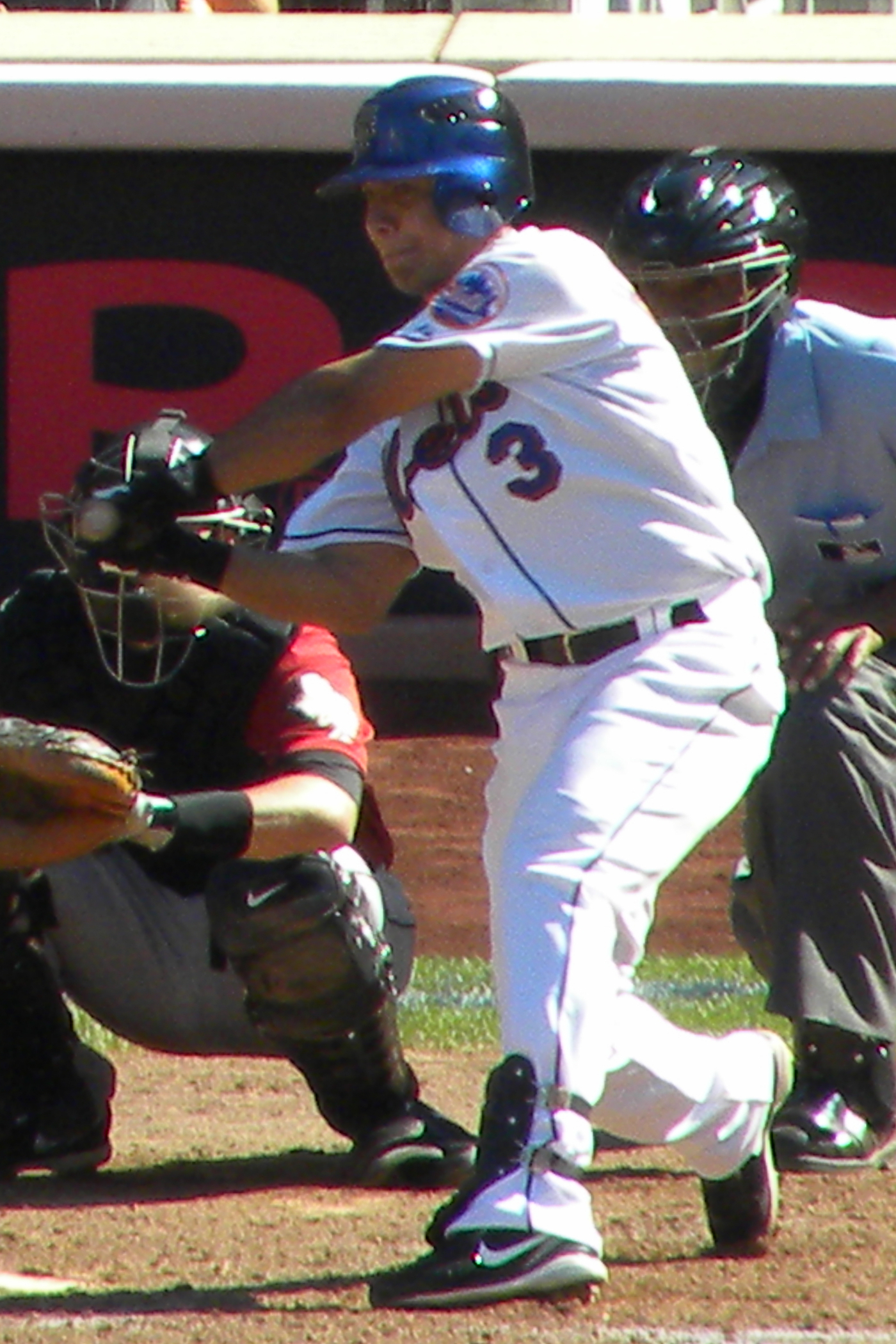
Hernández batting for the New York Mets in 2010

On February 3, 2010, Hernández signed a minor league contract with the New York Mets. The Mets purchased Hernández's contract from the Buffalo Bisons on August 27, 2010. Hernández played in 17 games for the Mets in 2010, batting .250 with two home runs with 6 RBI. His season ended after hitting a foul ball off his right foot, breaking a bone in his foot on September 18, although he still managed to hit a home run on the next pitch. On October 17, 2011, he elected free agency.

=== Texas Rangers ===
On December 1, 2011, Hernández signed a minor league contract with the Texas Rangers. Hernández spent most of 2012 with the Triple-A Round Rock Express, hitting .262/.303/.376 with eight home runs and 70 RBI in 129 games as the team's shortstop. Hernández did play two games with the Rangers, going 0-for-1 in each, coming in as a defensive replacement.

=== Cleveland Indians ===
On November 7, 2012, Hernández signed a minor league deal with the Cleveland Indians.

=== Wichita Wingnuts ===
Hernandez signed with the Wichita Wingnuts of the American Association of Independent Professional Baseball and played with them in the 2015 season.

=== Bridgeport Bluefish ===
On March 29, 2016, Hernández signed with the Bridgeport Bluefish of the Atlantic League of Professional Baseball.

On November 1, 2017, Hernández was drafted by the New Britain Bees of the Bridgeport Bluefish dispersal draft. On February 20, 2018, Hernández signed with the Bees for the 2018 season.

=== Post-playing career ===
Hernández announced his retirement prior to the season on April 21, 2018, in order to pursue a coaching opportunity in the Kansas City Royals organization.

== See also ==
- List of Major League Baseball players from Venezuela
