= Cory Doyne =

American baseball player (born 1981)

- Pitcher
- Born: August 13, 1981 (age 45); Tampa, Florida, U.S.
- Batted: Right Threw: Right

MLB debut
- June 16, 2007, for the Baltimore Orioles

Last MLB appearance
- August 2, 2007, for the Baltimore Orioles

MLB statistics
- Win–loss record: 0–0
- Earned run average: 14.73
- Strikeouts: 2
- Stats at Baseball Reference

Teams
- Baltimore Orioles (2007)

Michael Cory Doyne (born August 13, 1981) is an American former professional baseball pitcher. He played in Major League Baseball (MLB) for the Baltimore Orioles. Height 5’8

== Career highlights ==
He spent most of the 2007 season with the Triple-A Norfolk Tides. He made his major league debut on June 16, 2007, (although the official Orioles website states that his contract was not purchased until the next day). He was then optioned back to Triple-A on June 19. His latest call-up was on July 25, when he took Chris Ray's place on the roster, after Ray was placed on the DL.

Doyne's major league debut was June 16, 2007, against the Arizona Diamondbacks at Oriole Park at Camden Yards. The first batter he faced was Conor Jackson, who was also the first walk he surrendered in his career (on five pitches). His first out recorded came against the very next batter, as Arizona second baseman Orlando Hudson grounded the 7th pitch of the at-bat to second, and was retired 4–3.

His first career strike out came in his second Major League game (also at Camden Yards) on July 25, 2007, against the Tampa Bay Devil Rays. Carl Crawford, the first batter Doyne faced in the game, swung and missed on the fourth pitch of the at-bat. Doyne retired the next two batters on fly balls, turning in the first complete inning of his career.

The first earned run he surrendered came the next night, also against the Devil Rays. Doyne came on to pitch in the 9th inning, and walked Brendan Harris to begin the inning (his second career walk). Harris moved over to third base on a single by catcher Raul Casanova, and scored on a sacrifice fly off the bat of Akinori Iwamura. Casanova would later score Doyne's second career earned run on a single by Greg Norton, but Doyne would complete the inning, and the Orioles won the game by a score of 10–7.

On June 3, 2009, Doyne signed a Minor League deal with the Washington Nationals.
