= Jon Leicester =

American baseball player (born 1979)

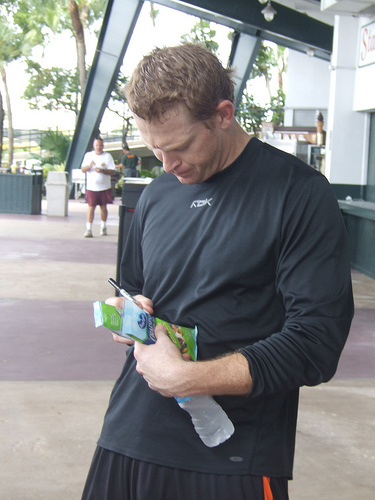
- Pitcher
- Born: February 7, 1979 (age 47); Mariposa, California, U.S.
- Batted: Right Threw: Right

Professional debut
- MLB: June 9, 2004, for the Chicago Cubs
- NPB: May 30, 2009, for the Orix Buffaloes
- CPBL: March 17, 2012, for the Uni-President 7-Eleven Lions

Last appearance
- MLB: September 28, 2007, for the Baltimore Orioles
- NPB: August 15, 2010, for the Orix Buffaloes
- CPBL: July 14, 2013, for the Uni-President 7-Eleven Lions

MLB statistics
- Win–loss record: 7–6
- Earned run average: 5.88
- Strikeouts: 58

NPB statistics
- Win–loss record: 2–3
- Earned run average: 4.88
- Strikeouts: 53

CPBL statistics
- Win–loss record: 14–9
- Earned run average: 3.03
- Strikeouts: 149
- Stats at Baseball Reference

Teams
- Chicago Cubs (2004–2005); Baltimore Orioles (2007); Orix Buffaloes (2009–2010); Uni-President 7-Eleven Lions (2012–2013)

Career highlights and awards
- Taiwan Series champion (2013)

Jonathan David Leicester (born February 7, 1979) is an American former professional baseball pitcher. He previously played for the Chicago Cubs and Baltimore Orioles of Major League Baseball.

== Career ==
Originally drafted by the Chicago Cubs in the 2000 Major League Baseball draft, Leicester made his major league debut for the Cubs in 2004.

Prior to the 2006 season, Leicester was traded to the Texas Rangers in exchange for left-handed minor league pitcher Clint Brannon. Leicester never appeared in a game for the Rangers in the majors, and after the 2006 season, became a free agent.

In 2007, he began playing for the Baltimore Orioles organization. He spent most of the season with the Triple-A Norfolk Tides, but pitched his first major league complete game in a September callup. He began the 2008 season in Norfolk. After the 2008 season, he signed with the Orix Buffaloes in Nippon Professional Baseball, playing for the club in 2009 and 2010. On March 1, 2011, San Diego signed him and he spent the year at AAA Tucson starting 25 games. He elected free agency after the season. Leicester played two seasons for the Uni-President 7-Eleven Lions of the Chinese Professional Baseball League in 2012 and 2013.

On March 29, 2014, Leicester signed with the Diablos Rojos del Mexico of the Mexican League. On June 3, 2014, Leicester was released. On February 6, 2015, Leicester signed with the Leones de Yucatán. He was released on June 22, 2015, and signed with the Pericos de Puebla the next day. Leicester was released by Puebla on July 2.

Leicester signed with the Southern Maryland Blue Crabs of the Atlantic League of Professional Baseball shortly after his release from the Pericos. He re-signed with the Blue Crabs for the 2016 season and became a free agent after the year.
