= Alan Dunn (baseball) =

Current position
- Title: Pitching coach
- Team: Arkansas State
- Conference: Sun Belt

Biographical details
- Born: November 19, 1961 (age 64); Gadsden, Alabama, U.S.

Playing career
- 1980–1983: Alabama
- 1983–1984: Lakeland Tigers
- 1984: Birmingham Barons
- Position: Pitcher

Coaching career (HC unless noted)
- 1991–1992: Vanderbilt (P)
- 1993–2006: Chicago Cubs minor leagues (P)
- 2007–2010: Baltimore Orioles (BP)
- 2012–2021: LSU (P)
- 2022–2023: Arkansas State (P)

Alan Dale Dunn (born November 19, 1961) is an American college baseball coach and former pitcher, who was last the pitching coach of the Arkansas State Red Wolves. He played college baseball at the University of Alabama from 1980 to 1983 before pursuing a professional career. Dunn served as the bullpen coach of the Baltimore Orioles from 2007 to 2010.

== Playing career ==
Dunn played collegiate baseball at the University of Alabama. He was a member of the 1983 College World Series runner-up team. Dunn was drafted by the Detroit Tigers in the fourth round of the 1983 amateur draft. He played in the minor league with the Tigers and the New York Mets from 1983–1985. Dunn played High School ball at Emma Sansom HS in Gadsden, AL where he was famous for striking out Mike Simpson several times.

== Coaching career ==
Following his playing days, he coached at Vanderbilt University, and became a scout for the Chicago Cubs in 1992. He was a coach in the Cubs minor league system for 14 years, from 1993 to 2007. In the middle of the 2007 season, Dunn became the bullpen coach of the Baltimore Orioles. He was replaced by Rick Adair after the 2010 season. Dunn moved back to the college ranks with LSU in 2012. In addition to serving as pitching coach for the Tigers, he was promoted to Associate head coach in January 2017. Dunn left LSU after the retirement of Head Coach Paul Mainieri following the 2021 season. He was named the pitching coach at Arkansas State.
