= Kurt Birkins =

American baseball player (born 1980)

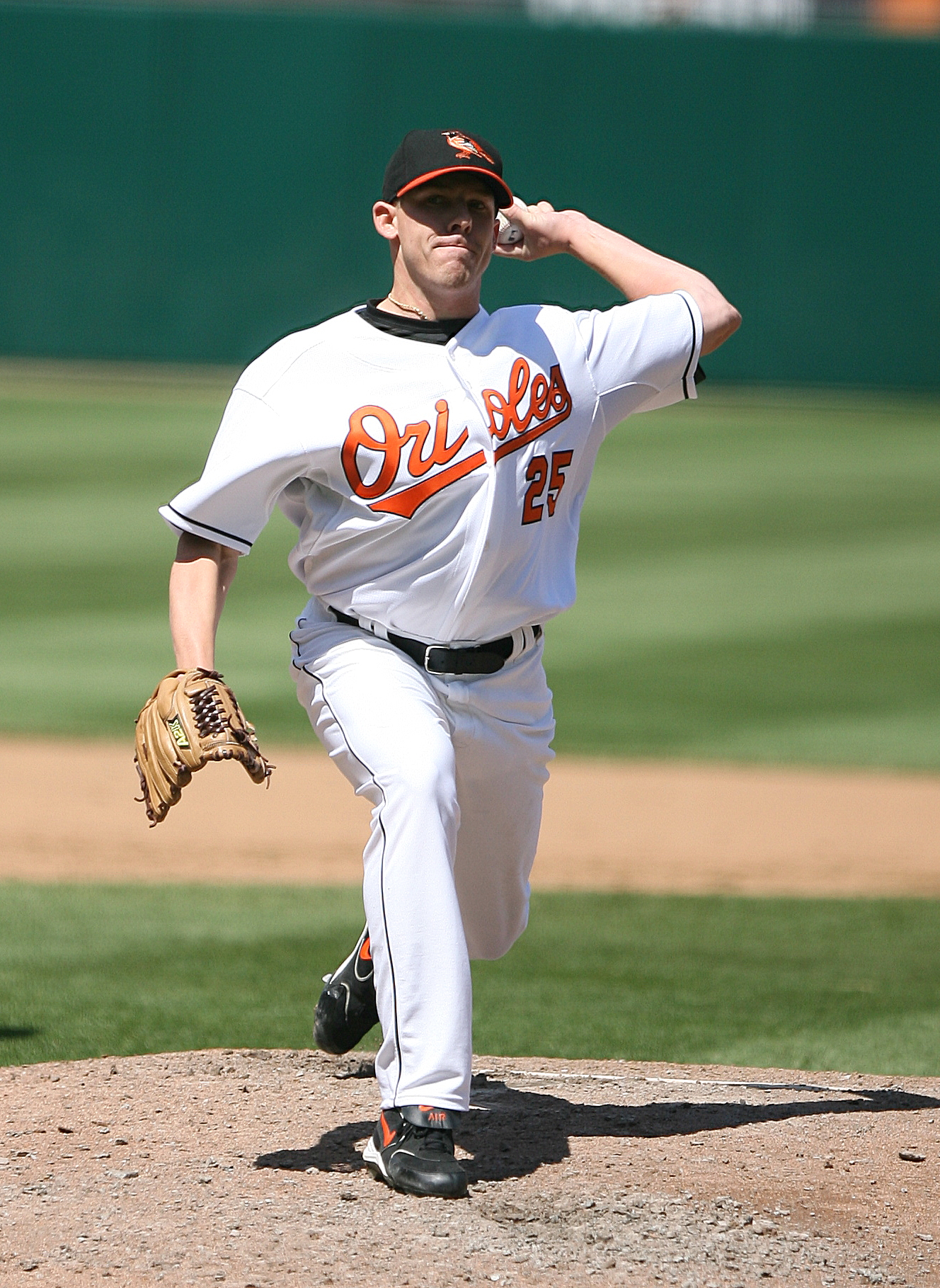
- Kurt Birkins
- Pitcher
- Born: August 11, 1980 (age 46); West Hills, California, U.S.
- Batted: Left Threw: Left

MLB debut
- May 4, 2006, for the Baltimore Orioles

Last MLB appearance
- May 4, 2008, for the Tampa Bay Rays

MLB statistics
- Win–loss record: 6–4
- Earned run average: 5.85
- Strikeouts: 64
- Stats at Baseball Reference

Teams
- Baltimore Orioles (2006–2007); Tampa Bay Rays (2008)

Kurt Daniel Birkins (born August 11, 1980) is an American former Major League Baseball (MLB) player who pitched for the Baltimore Orioles (2006-2007) and Tampa Bay Rays (2008).

== High school/college ==
Birkins attended El Camino Real high school in Woodland Hills, California. He played baseball for the Conquistadors and helped them win back-to-back LA City Championships in 1997 and 1998. He was named MVP of the 1998 championship game after throwing a 10 inning complete game, striking out 12, and hitting the go ahead 2-run double.

Birkins pitched for the UCLA Bruins in 1999 and led the staff in ERA, but decided to step away after the season due to burn out. During his time away from school, he volunteered as an assistant coach for his alma mater. That June, Birkins was selected in the 33rd round (984th overall) by the Baltimore Orioles. El Camino Real's senior infielder Conor Jackson was drafted in the 31st round (936th overall) by the Cleveland Indians which meant a player and coach from the same high school were drafted on the same day, and both went on to play in the Major Leagues.

In the fall of 2000, Birkins enrolled at Los Angeles Pierce College and was rated by Baseball America as the #1 Junior College draft prospect in the country. Birkins signed with the Baltimore Orioles prior to the 2001 draft as they held his rights from the previous year as a "draft-and-follow" prospect.

== MLB career ==
Birkins made his Major League debut on May 4, 2006, against the Texas Rangers throwing 2.1 scoreless innings in relief. He struck out Mark Texiera to record his first Major League strikeout. He picked up his first Major League victory on May 28, 2006, against the Anaheim Angels. Birkins retired all four batters he faced including two strikeouts.

After the 2007 season, Birkins was claimed off waivers by the Tampa Bay Rays. He was a member of the 2008 Tampa Bay Rays which won the franchise's first American League pennant.

He signed a minor league contract with the Colorado Rockies in February 2009 and pitched for the AAA Colorado Springs SkySox in 2009 and 2010. After conclusion of the 2010 season, Birkins retired from professional baseball.

== Personal ==
After his baseball career, Birkins enrolled at the University of North Carolina at Greensboro and graduated summa cum laude. He is currently the Assistant Executive Director at the ABCA and resides in Winston-Salem, North Carolina with his wife Ashley and their two daughters.
