= Ramón Hernández =

Venezuelan baseball player (born 1976)

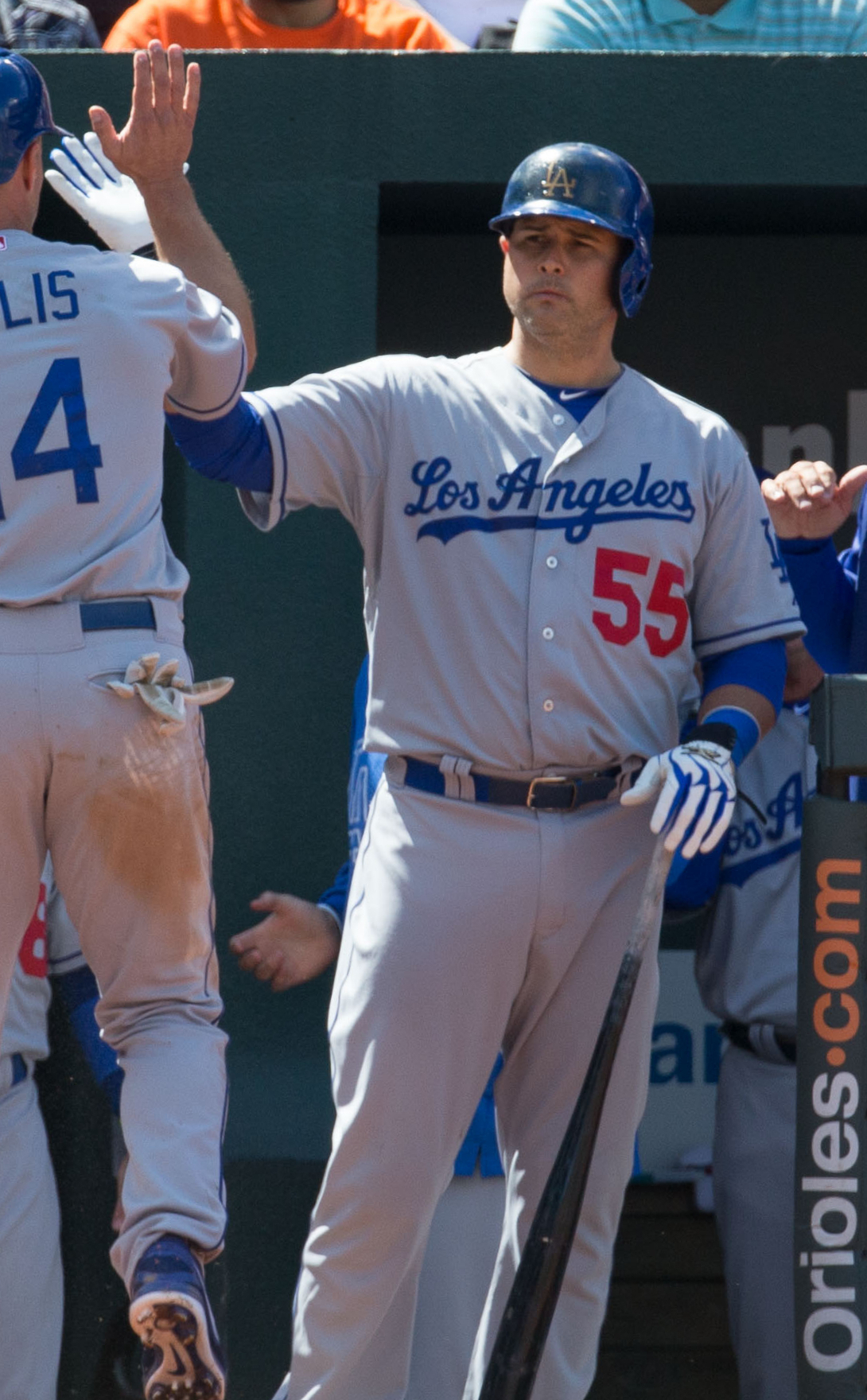
- Hernández with the Los Angeles Dodgers

Athletics – No. 55
- Catcher
- Born: May 20, 1976 (age 50); Caracas, Venezuela
- Batted: Right Threw: Right

MLB debut
- June 29, 1999, for the Oakland Athletics

Last MLB appearance
- June 12, 2013, for the Los Angeles Dodgers

MLB statistics
- Batting average: .263
- Home runs: 169
- Runs batted in: 757
- Stats at Baseball Reference

Teams
- Oakland Athletics (1999–2003); San Diego Padres (2004–2005); Baltimore Orioles (2006–2008); Cincinnati Reds (2009–2011); Colorado Rockies (2012); Los Angeles Dodgers (2013); As coach: Oakland Athletics / Athletics (2023–present)

Career highlights and awards
- All-Star (2003)

Ramón José Hernández Marin (Spanish pronunciation: [raˈmon eɾˈnandeθ]; born May 20, 1976) is a Venezuelan former professional baseball catcher and current major league staff assistant for the Athletics of Major League Baseball (MLB). He played in MLB with the Oakland Athletics (1999–2003), San Diego Padres (2004–2005), Baltimore Orioles (2006–2008), Cincinnati Reds (2009–2011), Colorado Rockies (2012) and Los Angeles Dodgers (2013).

== Career ==
=== Oakland Athletics ===
Hernández made his debut with Oakland on June 29, 1999, as a backup catcher for A. J. Hinch. His steady progress enabled the Athletics to trade Hinch to the Kansas City Royals a year later.

Hernández became known as a catcher who could hit, mentor young pitchers and had steady defense. He earned praise for his defense and game-calling skills with a pitching staff that included Cy Young Award winner Barry Zito, Mark Mulder and Tim Hudson.

In 2003, Hernández broke out with his best season, hitting .273 with 21 home runs and 78 RBI and made his first All-Star Game. His most memorable moment as an Athletic came in Game 1 of the 2003 ALDS against the Boston Red Sox. With the bases loaded and two outs in the bottom of the 12th inning, Hernández bunted down the third base line, which scored Eric Chavez to win the game. After the season on November 26, Oakland traded him to the San Diego Padres along with outfielder Terrence Long in exchange for outfielder Mark Kotsay. At the time of the deal, Hernández had caught at least 135 games each of the prior four years.

=== San Diego Padres ===
In both 2004 and 2005, Hernández battled injuries. On June 20, 2004, against the Toronto Blue Jays, he strained his left knee after being involved in a collision at home plate. The injury sidelined him for four weeks; he was activated on July 26. Upon his return, he batted .281 with 11 home runs and 38 RBI in the second half. He finished the 2004 season with a .276 batting average, 18 home runs, and 63 RBI in 111 games.

In 2005, he suffered a wrist injury on June 17 while diving into first base during a game against the Minnesota Twins. His jammed wrist forced him to the disabled list, causing him to miss 18 games. Hernández returned to the lineup on July 7, but the condition worsened and he decided to have surgery to repair the torn cartilage. The surgery forced Hernández to the DL for the third time in two seasons, and he missed the entire month of August. He rejoined the team in time for the September stretch run, and was pivotal in the Padres' run to the National League West championship. Hernández hit .359 in September with five home runs, and drove in 20 runs in just 22 games. He came up with several clutch hits, including two dramatic game-winning home runs: a three-run walk-off shot against Washington in the 12th inning on September 17, and a grand slam against division rival San Francisco just 10 days later. He finished the season with a .290 average, 12 home runs and 58 RBI in 99 games. With his performance, Hernández became one of baseball's more coveted players in the winter's free agent market.

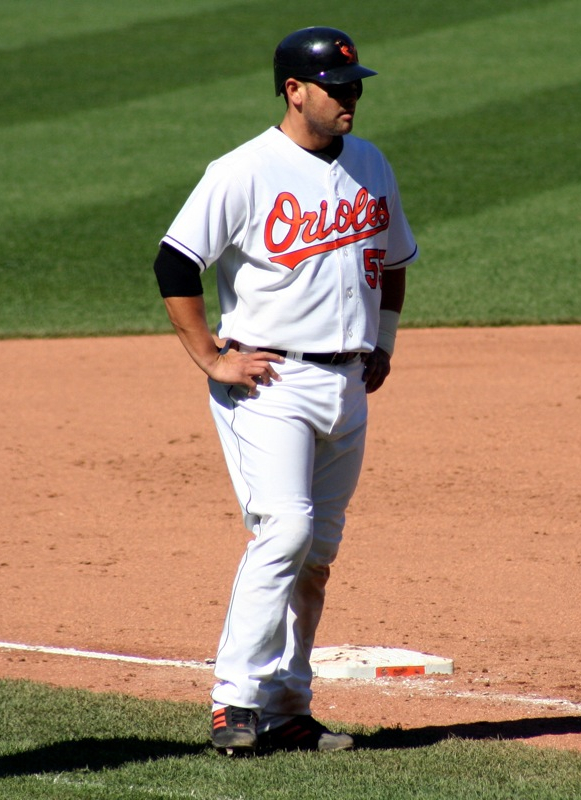
Hernández on April 9, 2006, with the Baltimore Orioles.

=== Baltimore Orioles ===
On December 8, 2005, Hernández agreed to a four-year, $27.5 million contract with the Baltimore Orioles. The contract included a team option for the 2010 season as well. In his introductory press conference, Hernández spoke excitedly about working with a young pitching staff, hitting in Camden Yards and helping the team become a contender. He also expressed optimism about spending the next four years with Miguel Tejada as a teammate. (Two years, as it turned out; Tejada was traded to the Astros before the 2008 season). Hernández and Tejada had been teammates in Oakland for almost five years, and are godfathers to each other's children. Hernández would compile a respectable .275 batting average in 2006 with 23 home runs and 91 RBI. Veterans Chris Widger and Danny Ardoin served as Hernández's backups throughout the season.

=== Cincinnati Reds ===
Hernández was traded to the Cincinnati Reds for Ryan Freel and minor leaguers Justin Turner and Brandon Waring on December 9, 2008. Following the season, the Reds signed Hernandez to a one-year, $3 million contract.

=== Colorado Rockies ===
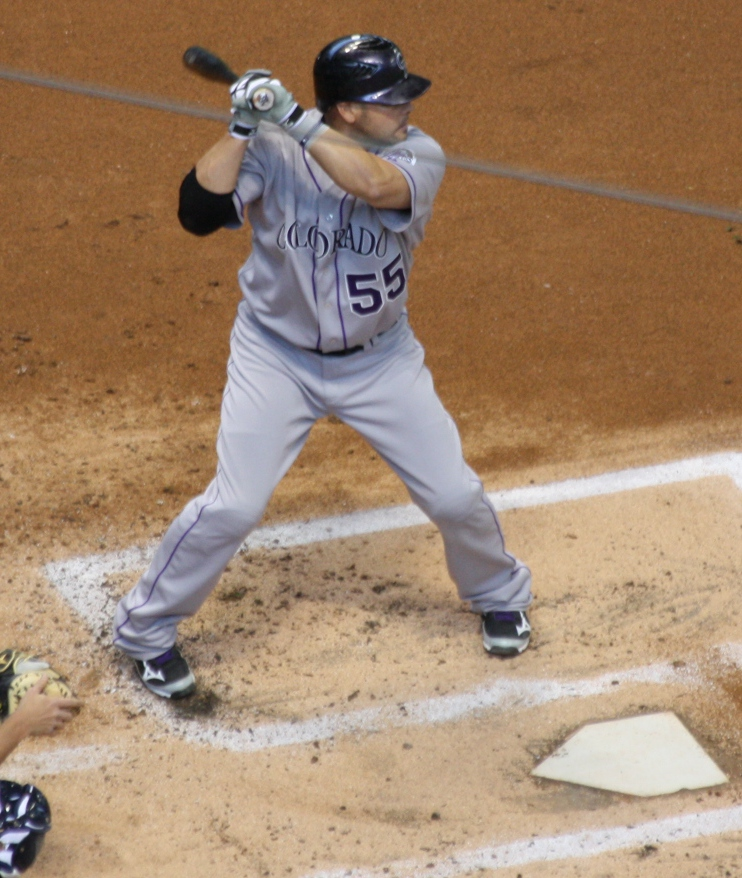
Batting with the Rockies in 2012

On November 30, 2011, Hernandez signed a two-year contract with the Colorado Rockies. He played 52 games for the Rockies and four games for the Triple-A Colorado Springs Sky Sox in the 2012 season.

On March 28, 2013, towards the end of spring training, the Rockies designated Hernández for assignment.

=== Los Angeles Dodgers ===
On April 6, 2013, the Rockies traded Hernández to the Los Angeles Dodgers for pitcher Aaron Harang. In 17 games as the Dodgers backup catcher, he hit .208 with three home runs and 6 RBI. He was designated for assignment on June 14, and released on June 22.

=== Toronto Blue Jays ===
The Toronto Blue Jays signed Hernández on June 30, 2013, and assigned him to their Triple-A affiliate, the Buffalo Bisons.

Hernández was released on July 9 after playing in five games for the Bisons and hitting .105 (2-for-19) with 2 RBI.

=== Kansas City Royals ===
Hernández signed a minor league deal with an invitation to Spring Training with the Kansas City Royals on January 7, 2014. He opted out of his deal on March 23 and became a free agent.

== Post-playing career ==
On December 20, 2022, Hernández was hired by the Oakland Athletics as a staff assistant/interpreter for the 2023 season.

On November 1, 2024, Hernández was elected to the Venezuelan Baseball Hall of Fame, receiving 76% of the votes from the Contemporary Committee.

== See also ==
- List of Major League Baseball players from Venezuela
- List of Major League Baseball career putouts as a catcher leaders
