= Jim Hoey =

American baseball player (born 1982)

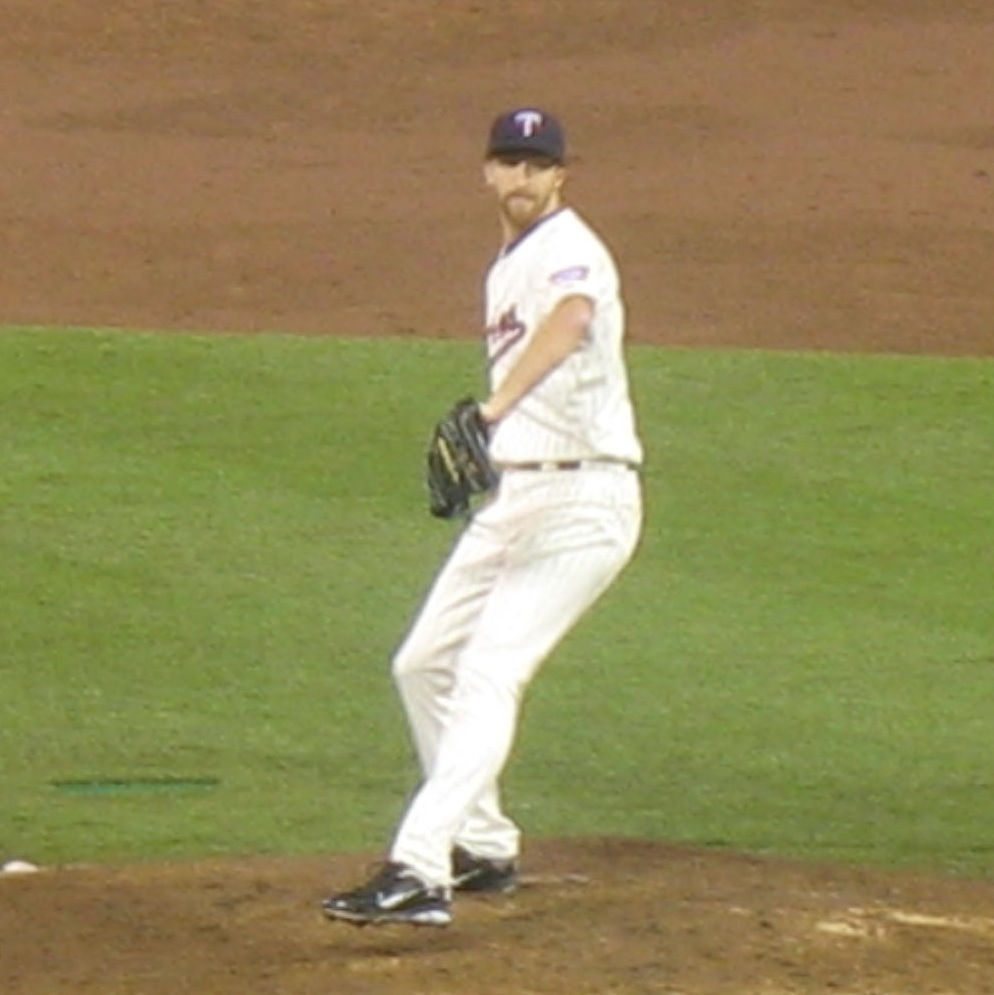
- Hoey with the Minnesota Twins in 2011
- Pitcher
- Born: December 30, 1982 (age 43); Hamilton Township, Mercer County, New Jersey, U.S.
- Batted: Right Threw: Right

MLB debut
- August 23, 2006, for the Baltimore Orioles

Last MLB appearance
- September 26, 2011, for the Minnesota Twins

MLB statistics
- Win–loss record: 4–7
- Earned run average: 7.02
- Strikeouts: 38
- Stats at Baseball Reference

Teams
- Baltimore Orioles (2006–2007); Minnesota Twins (2011)

James Urban Hoey (born December 30, 1982) is an American former Major League Baseball pitcher who played for the Baltimore Orioles and Minnesota Twins between 2006 and 2011.

== Early years ==
Hoey returned to the Trenton area in his sophomore year of high school and played for the Hamilton High School West varsity baseball team. In his senior year of high school, Hoey helped the team to win the NJSIAA Group III state championship with a 13-1 season. This was the school's first championship in its 70-year history. James walked away with 131 strike outs and a 0.48 ERA. In honor of James's prior accomplishments and his rapid success through the minor-league system, Hamilton High West retired his number during a formal ceremony on February 1, 2007.

Hoey played college baseball for Rider University in Lawrenceville, New Jersey. In 2001, he played collegiate summer baseball with the Hyannis Mets of the Cape Cod Baseball League.

== Professional career ==
During the 13th round of the June 2003 MLB amateur draft, the Orioles organization drafted Hoey out of Rider University and signed him on June 11. Initially, Rider University was using him as a starting pitcher. As a starter, Hoey had a 2.79 ERA for the rookie-level Bluefield Orioles and also made 15 starts for the Aberdeen IronBirds in 2004. He missed the rest of 2004 and most of 2005 due to Tommy John surgery; the surgery, as well as maturing, allowed him to gain three miles per hour on his fastball. Upon returning from the surgery, he became a relief pitcher. He pitched fifteen innings as a reliever in the short-season Class A New York–Penn League for the Aberdeen IronBirds in 2005 and started 2006 in the South Atlantic League with the Delmarva Shorebirds. He became Delmarva's closer at the start of the season; from there, he started a rapid ascent through the Orioles' minor-league system, receiving call-ups to the high-Class A Frederick Keys and the Class AA Bowie Baysox before the end of the minor-league season. Across the three levels, he combined for 33 saves and a 2.28 ERA; he allowed three home runs, struck out 73 batters, and walked 18 in 51 1/3 innings of work. He was called up to the Orioles on August 23, 2006, and made his first appearance with them against the Minnesota Twins. Early in the 2008 season it was announced that Hoey would undergo arthroscopic shoulder surgery and miss the entire year. He began the 2009 season with the Bowie Baysox.

On December 9, 2010, the Orioles traded Hoey along with fellow minor-league pitcher Brett Jacobson to the Minnesota Twins for shortstop J. J. Hardy and utility infielder Brendan Harris.

Hoey was called up to the major leagues by Minnesota on April 17, 2011, when they optioned Jeff Manship to the minors.

On December 12, 2011, Hoey was claimed off waivers by the Toronto Blue Jays. Hoey started the 2012 season with the Blue Jays AAA affiliate Las Vegas 51s. The International League transaction page for October 10 shows that Hoey elected free agency.

He was signed by the Milwaukee Brewers to a minor league contract on December 22, 2012.

== Personal ==
Hoey has begun a charity golf tournament, to benefit the Wounded Warrior Project and the Leukemia & Lymphoma Society.
