= Brian Burres =

American baseball player (born 1981)

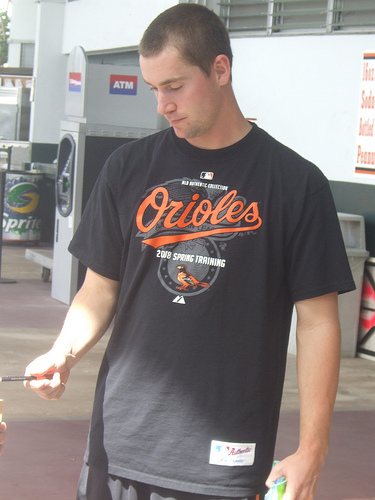
- Burres with the Baltimore Orioles in 2008
- Pitcher
- Born: April 8, 1981 (age 45); Oregon City, Oregon, U.S.
- Batted: Left Threw: Left

Professional debut
- MLB: September 8, 2006, for the Baltimore Orioles
- CPBL: March 24, 2013, for the Lamigo Monkeys

Last appearance
- MLB: September 28, 2011, for the Pittsburgh Pirates
- CPBL: August 24, 2013, for the Lamigo Monkeys

MLB statistics
- Win–loss record: 18–25
- Earned run average: 5.75
- Strikeouts: 224

CPBL statistics
- Win–loss record: 9–5
- Earned run average: 3.49
- Strikeouts: 93
- Stats at Baseball Reference

Teams
- Baltimore Orioles (2006–2008); Toronto Blue Jays (2009); Pittsburgh Pirates (2010–2011); Lamigo Monkeys (2013)

Brian Burres (born April 8, 1981) is an American former professional baseball pitcher. Burres' best pitch is his changeup. He also has a high 80s-low 90 MPH fastball and a curveball. He played in Major League Baseball (MLB) for the Baltimore Orioles, Toronto Blue Jays, and Pittsburgh Pirates, and in the Chinese Professional Baseball League (CPBL) for the Lamigo Monkeys.

== High school and collegiate career ==
Burres attended Sam Barlow High School in Gresham, Oregon, where he was named both Conference Player of the Year and Pitcher of the Year in 1999, as well as a first team all state outfielder. Burres went on to play at Mount Hood Community College, being drafted by the San Francisco Giants after one year.

== Professional career ==
=== San Francisco Giants ===
Burres was originally drafted by the San Francisco Giants in the 31st round (931st overall) of the 2000 MLB draft. He was in the Giants' system for three years. Following the 2005 season, the Giants signed utility infielder José Vizcaíno. They made room for Vizcaíno on the roster by designating Burres for assignment. He pitched for the Connecticut Defenders prior to being designated. He was later released.

=== Baltimore Orioles ===
On January 6, 2006, Burres was claimed off waivers by the Baltimore Orioles. He never cleared waivers, so the Orioles released him. Six days later, he was assigned to the Triple-A Ottawa Lynx.

On September 8, 2006, Burres made his major league debut with the Orioles, allowing two earned runs on three hits in two-thirds of an inning against the New York Yankees. He spent most of the 2006 season with Triple-A Ottawa, going 10–6 with a 3.76 ERA in 26 starts with the Lynx. He was promoted to the Orioles for most of the 2007 season, finishing the season 6–8 with a 5.95 ERA in 37 games (17 starts). Burres was named the fifth starter in the Orioles rotation to open the 2008 season, after a competition in spring training with teammate Matt Albers.

On February 2, 2009, Burres was designated for assignment to make room on the roster for Rich Hill.

=== Toronto Blue Jays ===
On February 4, 2009, Burres was claimed by the Toronto Blue Jays.

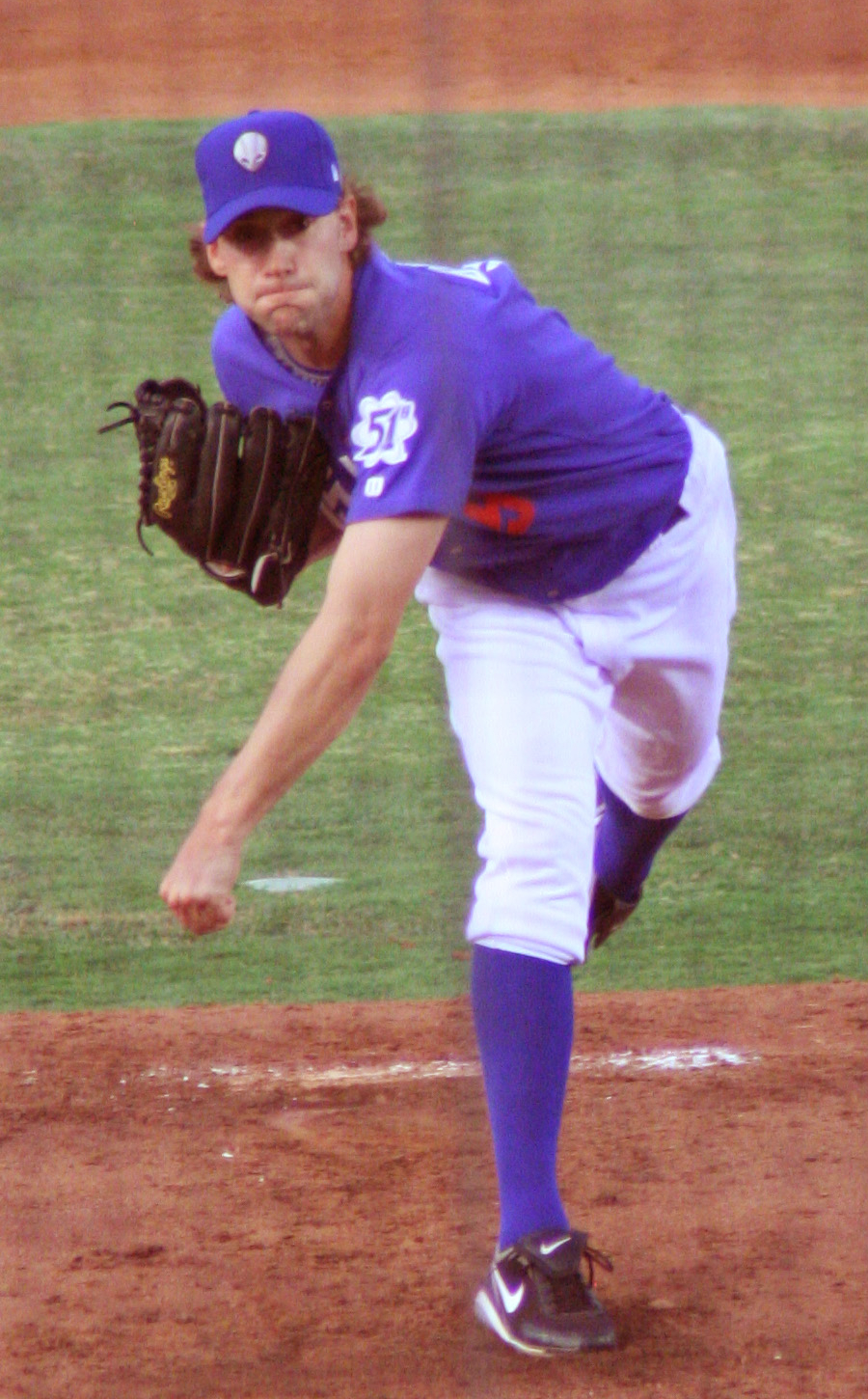
Burres with the Las Vegas 51s, Triple-A affiliate of the Toronto Blue Jays, in 2009

Burres spent spring training 2009 with Toronto, and was assigned to Triple-A Las Vegas 51s. With Toronto dealing with early-season injuries to several pitchers, Burres was recalled to the majors by the Jays on April 24, 2009, and made his first appearance for Toronto the next day, starting on the road against the Chicago White Sox. He wound up as the losing pitcher, but held the White Sox to two runs through the first four innings, before struggling in the fifth inning, when he left the game. Jays' manager Cito Gaston stated that Burres would remain in the rotation until several of Toronto's injured pitchers make their return to active duty.

=== Pittsburgh Pirates ===
On January 4, 2010, Burres signed a minor league contract with the Pittsburgh Pirates that included an invitation to spring training. On April 12, the Pirates selected Burres' contract, adding him to their active roster. In 20 games (13 starts) for Pittsburgh, he compiled a 4-5 record and 4.99 ERA with 45 strikeouts across 79 1/3 innings pitched. On December 2, the Pirates non-tendered Burres, making him a free agent.

On January 3, 2011, Burres re-signed with the Pirates on a new minor league contract. He had his contract selected on September 1. In 5 games (2 starts) for Pittsburgh, Burres logged a 3.86 ERA with 10 strikeouts over 14 innings of work. On October 31, Burres was removed from the 40-man roster and sent outright to the Triple-A Indianapolis Indians, but he rejected the assignment and elected free agency.

=== San Francisco Giants (second stint) ===
On January 18, 2012, Burres returned to his original team, the San Francisco Giants, signing a minor league contract that included an invite to spring training. In 22 starts split between the rookie-level Arizona League Giants and Triple-A Fresno Grizzlies, he accumulated a 4-6 record and 5.13 ERA with 73 strikeouts across 105 1/3 innings pitched. Burres elected free agency following the season on November 2.

=== Lamigo Monkeys ===
On February 4, 2013, after little interest from MLB and NPB teams, Burres signed with the Lamigo Monkeys of the Chinese Professional Baseball League. In 20 starts for the Monkeys, he posted a 9-5 record and 3.49 ERA with 93 strikeouts across 121+1/3 innings pitched. He was released on August 28.

=== Southern Maryland Blue Crabs ===
On March 31, 2014, Burres signed with the Southern Maryland Blue Crabs of the Atlantic League of Professional Baseball. In 9 starts for the Blue Crabs, he posted a 3-2 record and 1.64 ERA with 31 strikeouts across 49 1/3 innings pitched. Burres became a free agent following the season.

=== Colorado Rockies ===
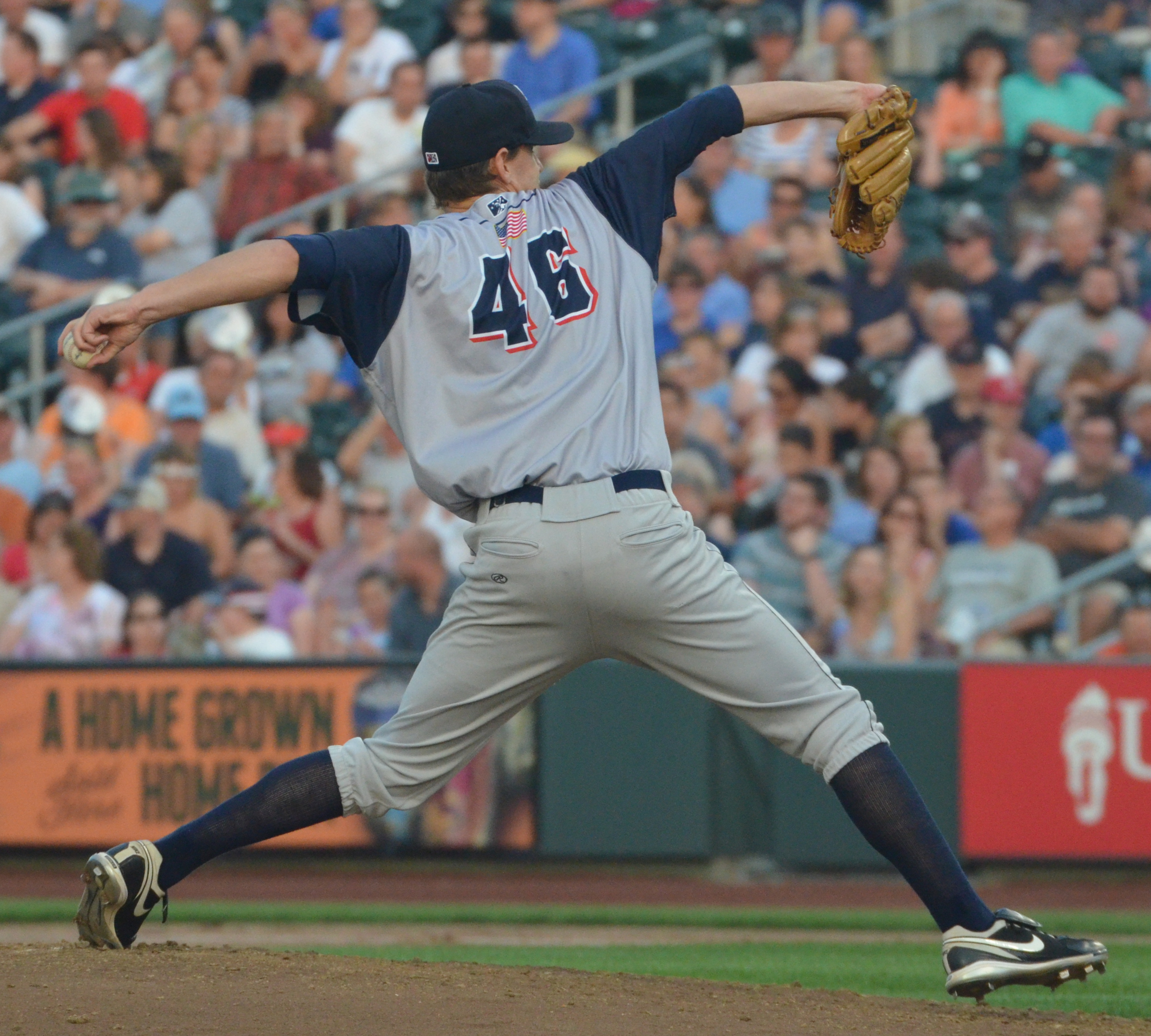
Burres pitching for the Colorado Springs Sky Sox, Triple-A affiliate of the Colorado Rockies, in 2014

On June 13, 2014, Burres signed a minor league contract with the Colorado Rockies.

=== Southern Maryland Blue Crabs (second stint) ===
On March 24, 2015, Burres signed with the Southern Maryland Blue Crabs of the Atlantic League of Professional Baseball. In 26 games (23 starts) for Southern Maryland. he compiled an 8-9 record and 3.98 ERA with 104 strikeouts across 133 1/3 innings pitched.

Burres re-signed with the Blue Crabs on April 5, 2016. In 28 appearances (27 starts) for the team, he registered an 11-9 record and 3.33 ERA with 139 strikeouts over 156 2/3 innings of work. Burres became a free agent after the season.

== Coaching career ==
On January 11, 2023, Burres was hired by the San Diego Padres to serve as an assistant coach for their High-A affiliate, the Fort Wayne TinCaps. On March 15, 2024, he was named the pitching coach for the team's rookie-level affiliate, the Arizona Complex League Padres. On January 17, 2025, Burres was promoted to serve as the manager of the Single-A Lake Elsinore Storm. On January 21, 2026, Burres was once again promoted, this time to serve as the bench coach for the Double-A San Antonio Missions.

== Personal life ==
Brian has an identical twin brother, Greg, who resides in the Pacific Northwest. Brian is the son of Nancy and Kirk, and has two other brothers, Kevin and Patrick. Brian married Lacy on the July 14, 2014, episode of Say Yes to the Dress: Atlanta.

Brian competes every year in the prestigious “Battle for the Boot” golf tournament held at Bandon Dunes and has won four times (2012, 2016, 2022, 2023).
