= Daniel Cabrera =

Dominican baseball player (born 1981)

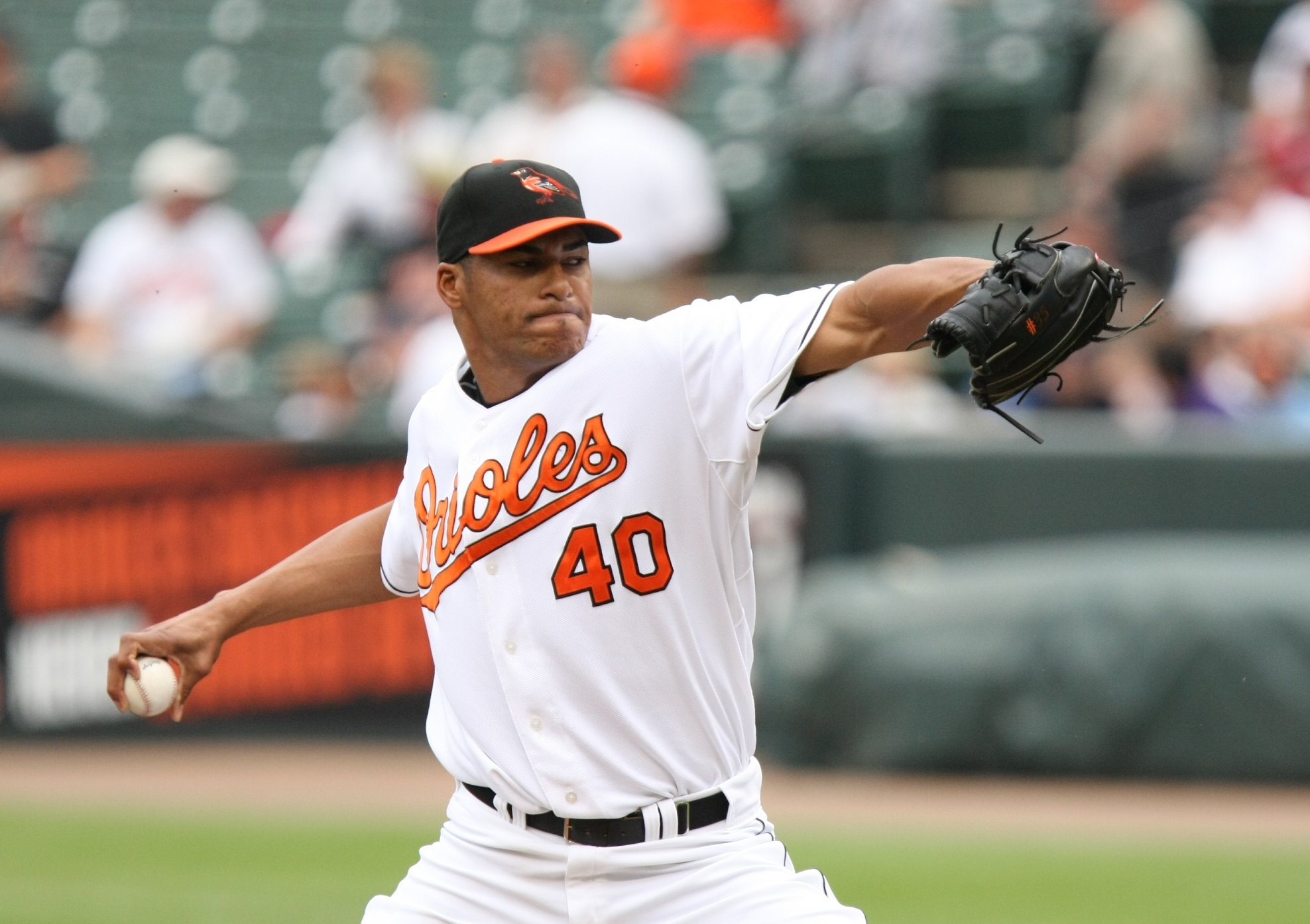
- Cabrera pitching for the Orioles in 2008
- Pitcher
- Born: May 28, 1981 (age 44); San Pedro de Macorís, Dominican Republic
- Batted: Right Threw: Right

Professional debut
- MLB: May 13, 2004, for the Baltimore Orioles
- NPB: April 4, 2013, for the Chunichi Dragons

Last appearance
- MLB: October 3, 2009, for the Arizona Diamondbacks
- NPB: August 28, 2014, for the Chunichi Dragons

MLB statistics
- Win–loss record: 48–65
- Earned run average: 5.10
- Strikeouts: 674

NPB statistics
- Win–loss record: 11–12
- Earned run average: 3.49
- Strikeouts: 157
- Stats at Baseball Reference

Teams
- Baltimore Orioles (2004–2008); Washington Nationals (2009); Arizona Diamondbacks (2009); Chunichi Dragons (2013–2014)

Daniel Alberto Cabrera Cruz (born May 28, 1981) is a Dominican former professional baseball right-handed starting pitcher. He played in Major League Baseball (MLB) for the Baltimore Orioles, Washington Nationals, and Arizona Diamondbacks, and in Nippon Professional Baseball (NPB) for the Chunichi Dragons. He is a tall pitcher, standing at 6' 7" and 225 lb.

== Professional career ==
=== Minor league career ===
Cabrera was signed by the Baltimore Orioles as an amateur free agent in 1999. He did not become a player in the Orioles minor league system until 2000, at the age of 19. For his first two seasons as a minor leaguer, Cabrera played in the rookie leagues; first with the Gulf Coast League Orioles, then with the Bluefield Orioles of the Appalachian League. In his first minor league season with GCL, Cabrera went 2–3 with a 5.49 ERA in 12 games (seven starts). With Bluefield, he posted a 5–2 record and a 3.28 ERA in 12 starts. When he was 22, Cabrera became a part of the Single-A Delmarva Shorebirds, where he finished 5–9 with a 4.24 ERA in 26 starts. By the end of his third season in the minors, Cabrera was racking up the numbers one would expect from a power pitcher. He recorded 105 strikeouts over 101 innings of work in the rookie leagues between 2001 and 2002, and added 120 strikeouts over 125.1 innings in Single-A Delmarva the following season. He was promoted to the Double-A Bowie Baysox before the 2004 season. While at Bowie, Cabrera began dominating; through five starts, he posted a 2.63 ERA and averaged over 11 strikeouts per nine innings.

=== Baltimore Orioles ===
On May 11, 2004, Cabrera was called up to make his major league debut against the Chicago White Sox. He did not disappoint, tossing six shutout innings while walking three and striking out three in Baltimore's 1–0 win on May 13. In June, he had a 2.83 ERA and held opponents to a mere .204 batting average. Though utterly dominating for the first few months, Cabrera's control slowly left him; by the end of the season, he was walking far too many batters to be effective, and finished the season with an even 5.00 ERA and a 12–8 record in 28 games (27 starts). After the season, he finished third in AL Rookie of the Year voting.

At the start of the 2005 season, Cabrera was listed as the Orioles #2 starter, thanks to a dominating Grapefruit League performance. His performance was extremely up-and-down, however. Though he had many utterly dominating performances, he had an equal number of disastrous outings. Cabrera finished the 2005 season with a 10–13 record and a 4.52 ERA in 29 starts. During 2005, Cabrera's name surfaced in trade rumors involving A. J. Burnett of the Florida Marlins. These trade rumors never reached fruition, however, and Burnett and Cabrera both remained with their respective teams for the duration of the season.

Cabrera once again demonstrated his potential in 2006 with some dominating performances against major-league caliber rosters while pitching in the WBC. Many baseball experts, including ESPN analysts Rob Neyer and Peter Gammons, predicted a breakout season for Cabrera in 2006. However, on July 14, 2006, Cabrera, after showing inconsistency at the major league level (leading the majors in both walks (75) and wild pitches (13), was optioned to the Triple-A Ottawa Lynx. To take his place in the starting rotation, left-hander Adam Loewen was recalled from Ottawa. Cabrera was recalled on August 7, and pitched a complete game shutout against the Toronto Blue Jays on August 19, allowing only five hits while striking out 10 batters. On September 28, Cabrera took a no-hitter into the ninth inning against the New York Yankees before surrendering a line drive single to Robinson Canó. He completed the game, only giving up that one hit.

Cabrera was the losing pitcher for the Orioles on August 22, 2007. That day, the Orioles suffered the worst beating in baseball since 1897, blowing a three-run lead and losing to the Texas Rangers 30–3. During his start on September 7, Cabrera was ejected in the fourth inning for throwing a beanball at the head of Boston Red Sox second baseman Dustin Pedroia after a third base balk. MLB commentators have cited this as being another instance of Cabrera being a man of massive potential with poor major league career execution. On September 13, he was suspended six games by Major League Baseball for the incident. In 2007, he had the lowest range factor of all major league pitchers, 0.75.

In 2008, Cabrera was 5–1 with a 3.48 ERA through 10 starts, but fell off after that. He finished the year leading the majors in hit batters (18) and had the majors' worst strikeout:walk ratio (1.06), and led the American League in wild pitches (15), and finished second in the AL with 90 walks. Overall, he finished the season 8–10 with a 5.25 ERA in 30 starts. On December 12, the Orioles declined to tender Cabrera a contract, making him a free agent.

=== Washington Nationals ===
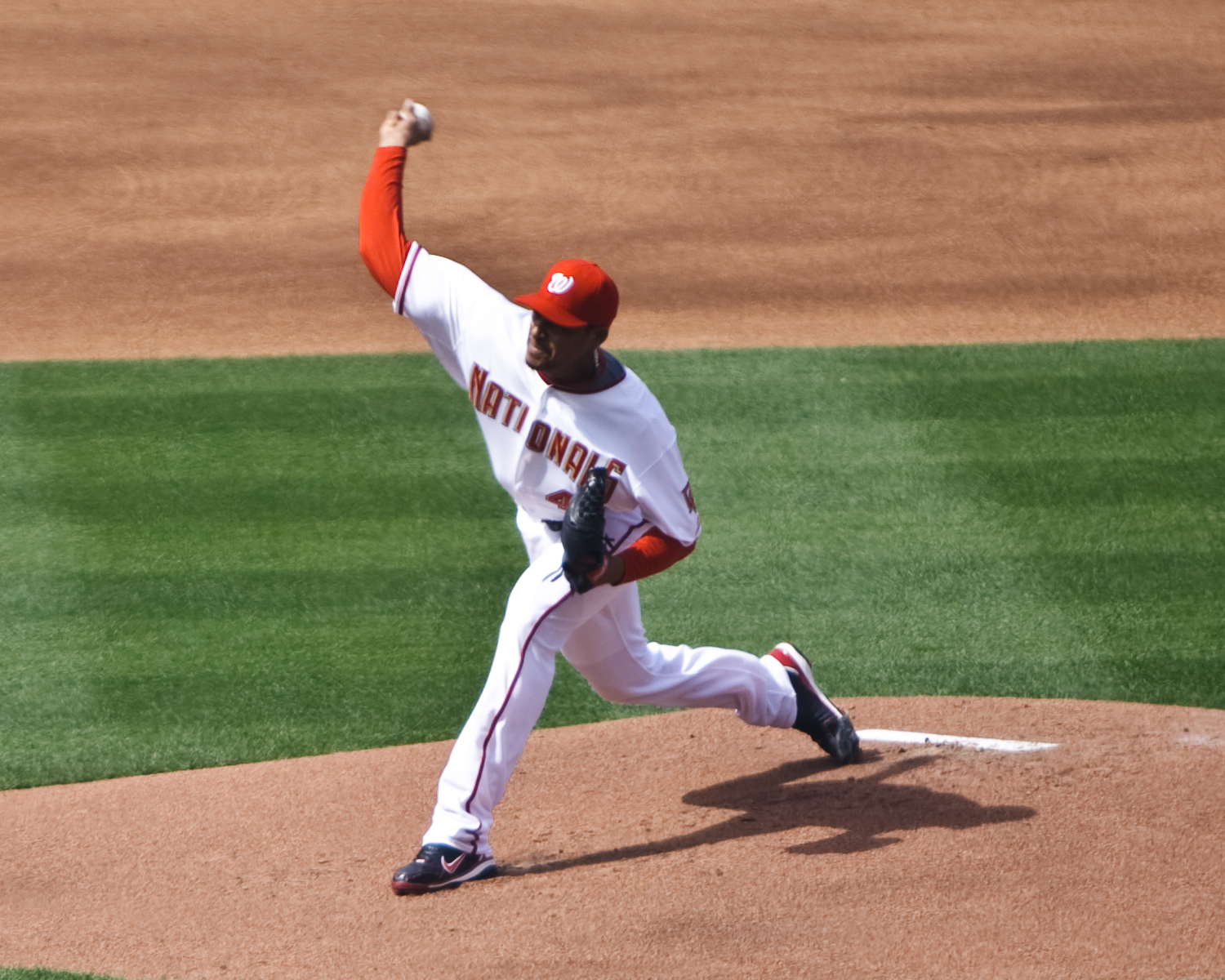
Cabrera with the Nationals on April 13, 2009.

On December 29, 2008, Cabrera signed a one-year deal with the Washington Nationals. On April 19, 2009, Cabrera reached base safely for the first time in his career with a four pitch walk issued by Hayden Penn. He struck out 18 times in a row beforehand. On May 26, Cabrera was designated for assignment, and once clearing waivers the Nationals announced that he would be released.

=== Arizona Diamondbacks ===
On August 3, 2009, the Arizona Diamondbacks signed Cabrera to a minor league contract. He elected free agency following the season on November 4.

=== Los Angeles Angels of Anaheim ===
On January 14, 2010, Cabrera signed a minor league contract with the Chicago White Sox with an invitation to spring training. He was released on March 17, midway through spring training.

On June 9, 2010, Cabrera signed a minor league contract with the Los Angeles Angels of Anaheim. He became a free agent following the season on November 6. Cabrera did not play in 2011 while recovering from Tommy John surgery.

=== Pittsburgh Pirates ===
On February 13, 2012, Cabrera signed a minor league contract with the Pittsburgh Pirates.

=== Arizona Diamondbacks (second stint) ===
On August 15, 2012, Cabrera was traded to the Arizona Diamondbacks. He became a free agent following the season on November 2.

=== Chunichi Dragons ===
On December 11, 2012, Cabrera signed with the Chunichi Dragons of Nippon Professional Baseball. He became a free agent following the 2014 season.

=== Cincinnati Reds ===
On February 18, 2015, Cabrera signed a minor league contract with the Cincinnati Reds. He made one start for the Triple-A Louisville Bats, allowing two runs (one earned) on two hits with one strikeout over three innings. Cabrera was released by the Reds organization on May 6.

=== Tigres de Quintana Roo ===
On May 27, 2015, Cabrera signed with the Tigres de Quintana Roo of the Mexican League. In 13 starts for Quintana Roo, he logged a 6-2 record and 3.63 ERA with 47 strikeouts over 72 innings of work. Cabrera was released by the Tigres on March 28, 2016.

== Pitching style ==
Cabrera throws three pitches: a fastball, a curveball, and a changeup. His fastball is his strongest pitch—he is able to throw it consistently in the upper 90s, with significant sinking and tailing action. He throws two different curveballs. One is a sharp-breaking, hard curve that behaves like a slurve and tops out in the mid-upper 80s. He also throws a looping, 12–6 curveball that tops out in the high 70s. Cabrera's changeup is improving, though in 2005 it was extremely inconsistent. He featured this pitch with more effectiveness while representing the Dominican Republic in the inaugural World Baseball Classic.

Cabrera's mix of velocity and pitch movement have enabled him to rack up impressive strikeout numbers, as evidenced by his excellent K rate in 2005 (8.8 K/9). However, he has had difficulties with control, as is often the case with a power pitcher of his size and level of experience. His career walk rate is an extremely high 5.1 BB/9; his career high for walks in a single game is 9, most recently in a bizarre outing where in addition to his walks, which loaded the bases in three of his five innings, fanned 10 batters and allowed only one run to cross the plate, on a wild pitch.

Though displaying tremendous potential for success, Cabrera is sometimes chastised for his perceived lack of mental toughness and overall inconsistency.
