= Chris Ray =

American baseball player (born 1982)

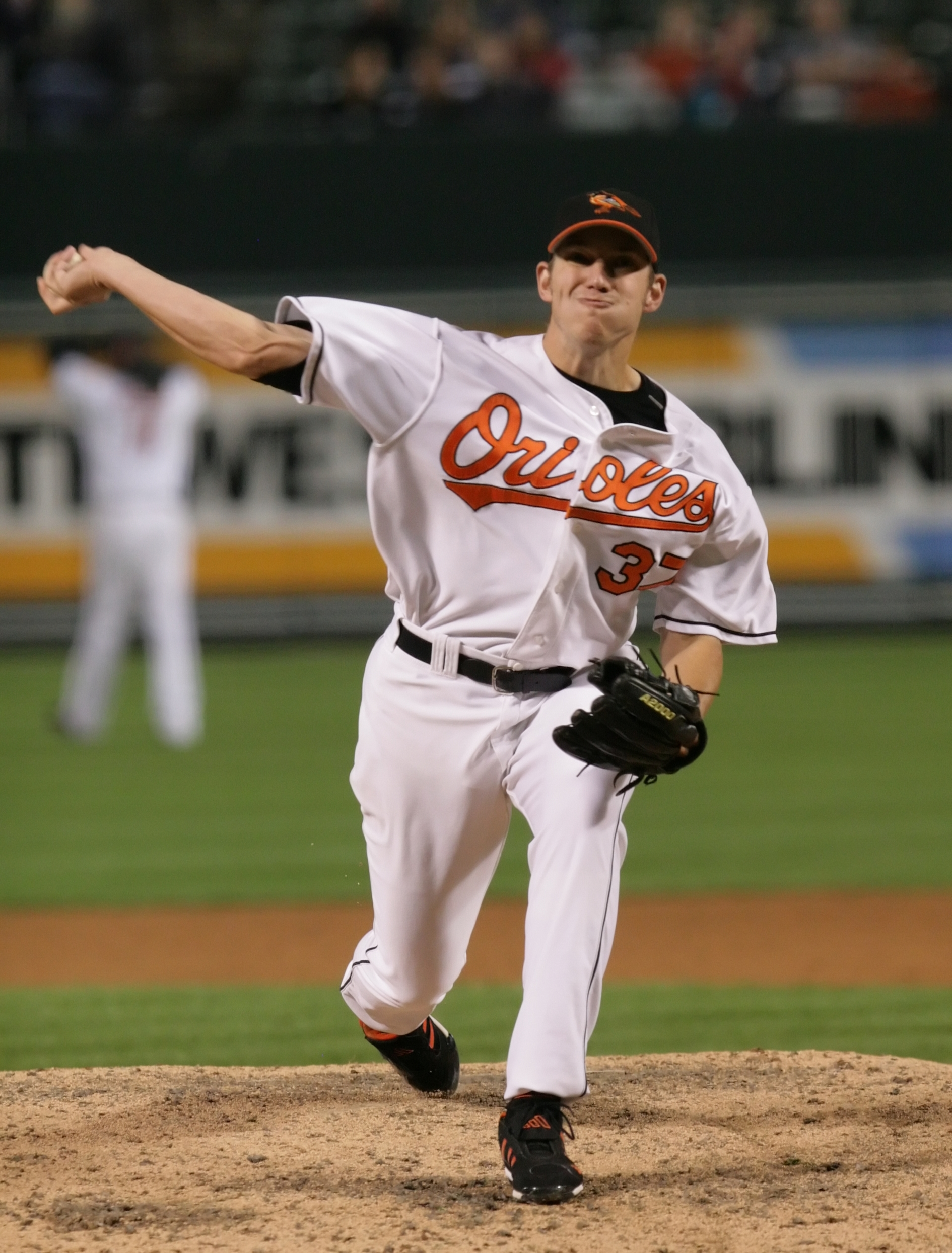
- Ray with the Baltimore Orioles
- Pitcher
- Born: January 12, 1982 (age 44); Tampa, Florida, U.S.
- Batted: Right Threw: Right

MLB debut
- June 14, 2005, for the Baltimore Orioles

Last MLB appearance
- July 29, 2011, for the Seattle Mariners

MLB statistics
- Win–loss record: 18–19
- Earned run average: 4.10
- Strikeouts: 230
- Stats at Baseball Reference

Teams
- Baltimore Orioles (2005–2007, 2009); Texas Rangers (2010); San Francisco Giants (2010); Seattle Mariners (2011)

Christopher Thomas Ray (born January 12, 1982) is an American former professional baseball pitcher. He played in Major League Baseball (MLB) for the Baltimore Orioles, Texas Rangers, San Francisco Giants, and Seattle Mariners.

== Early life and career ==
Ray graduated from Hillsborough High School in Tampa, Florida, and attended The College of William and Mary, where he started on their baseball team. In 2002, he played collegiate summer baseball with the Bourne Braves of the Cape Cod Baseball League and was named a league all-star. He was selected by the Orioles in the third round of the 2003 Major League Baseball draft.

== Professional career ==
=== Minor leagues ===
He spent the 2003 and 2004 seasons in the Orioles minor league system before being called up in June of 2005.

=== Baltimore Orioles ===
==== 2005 ====
In 2005, Ray allowed only two earned runs in just under 20 innings. However, during the month of August, Ray was optioned to the Orioles' Double-A affiliate, the Bowie Baysox. His stint at Bowie was brief, as he was called up again in late August. The second stint with the Orioles saw Ray allow 4 earned runs in 16 innings. Ray finished 2005 with a 2.66 ERA in 40 innings pitched over 41 games, compiling a record of 1-3 with 8 holds. Ray also compiled a 1.28 WHIP.

The Orioles coaching staff had been so impressed by Ray's 2005 season that they were considering him their closer of the future. But, since the Orioles have had little success with rushing prospects into big league roles, they planned to ease Ray into the closer role sometime in 2007. However, closer B.J. Ryan left the Orioles as a free agent to the Toronto Blue Jays, and the Orioles were unable to sign a closer on the free agent market to serve as a short term solution, causing Ray to be the Orioles' de facto closer.

==== 2006 ====
Ray became the full-time closer of Baltimore Orioles for the start of the 2006 season. Ray had a very successful first season as the closer for the O's. Ray compiled 33 saves with a 2.73 ERA and 51 strikeouts and allowed an opponent batting average of just .193. Given his success, the Orioles stuck with Ray as their closer for the 2007 regular season. However, his success would not carry over, resulting in a sub par year. During the 2007 season Ray's numbers dropped to 16 saves with a 4.43 ERA and 44 strikeouts.

==== 2007–2009 ====
Ray underwent Tommy John surgery on August 17, 2007. In August 2008, he made nine rehabilitation appearances in the minor leagues, but did not pitch for the Orioles during the season. In 2009, he made the Opening Day roster but posted an era of 7.27.

=== Texas Rangers ===
Ray was traded to the Texas Rangers on December 9, 2009 for Kevin Millwood. He had 35 appearances and an ERA of 3.40.

=== San Francisco Giants ===
Ray was traded to the San Francisco Giants, along with pitching prospect Michael Main, for Bengie Molina on June 30, 2010. Sportswriter Andrew Baggarly referred to Ray as the "fifth inning, runners on second and third with two outs" member of the bullpen. On December 2, the Giants non-tendered Ray, making him a free agent.

=== Seattle Mariners ===
Ray signed a minor league contract with the Seattle Mariners on January 25, 2011. The deal included an invitation to spring training. On August 1, Ray was placed on the 15-day disabled list with a strained right latissimus dorsi muscle. He was released on August 16.

=== Cleveland Indians ===
Ray attended spring training in 2012 with the Cleveland Indians as a non-roster invitee. Reassigned to minor league camp on March 30, Ray began the season pitching in the Triple-A Columbus Clippers' opening game on April 5. Ray was released by the Indians on July 7.

=== Oakland Athletics ===
On July 13, 2012, Ray signed a minor league contract with the Oakland Athletics and was assigned to the Triple-A Sacramento River Cats. He was released on July 26. In the 2012–2013 offseason, Ray retired from professional baseball.

== Personal life ==
Ray and his wife have two children. Ray said in March 2013 that he was retired from baseball.

In November 2012, Ray, his brother, and their families opened a craft brewery in Ashland, Virginia, Center Of The Universe Brewing. Ray had been an avid homebrewer and released a collaborative charity beer with Fremont Brewing Company in July 2011, benefiting Operation Homefront. Named Homefront IPA, it was sold at Safeco Field, Fremont's brewery, and various stores in the Seattle area. In 2013. Homefront IPA was collaboratively produced by nine breweries from all over the country, including Center of the Universe Brewing. In 2014 eleven breweries were involved.
