= Brandon Fahey =

American baseball player (born 1981)

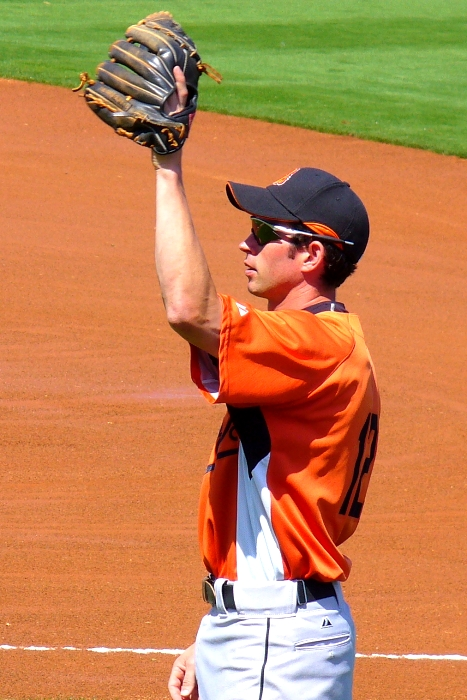
- Fahey with the Baltimore Orioles
- Utility player
- Born: January 18, 1981 (age 45); Dallas, Texas, U.S.
- Batted: Left Threw: Right

MLB debut
- April 30, 2006, for the Baltimore Orioles

Last MLB appearance
- September 28, 2008, for the Baltimore Orioles

MLB statistics
- Batting average: .224
- Home runs: 2
- Runs batted in: 36
- Stats at Baseball Reference

Teams
- Baltimore Orioles (2006–2008)

Brandon Wade Fahey (born January 18, 1981) is an American former professional baseball utility player. He played in Major League Baseball (MLB) for the Baltimore Orioles from 2006 to 2008.

He played high school baseball for Duncanville High School in Duncanville, Texas. While living at Duncanville, his father Bill Fahey played baseball for the San Francisco Giants of MLB.

== Career ==
=== College years ===
Fahey went to Grayson County College winning the Junior College National Championship before transferring to the University of Texas, where he played baseball for a year. He hit .303 in 45 games as the Longhorns won the National Championship in 2002.

=== Baltimore Orioles ===
Fahey was selected by the Baltimore Orioles in the 12th round (346th overall) of the 2002 Major League Baseball draft. He was previously selected by the San Diego Padres in the 17th round (532nd overall) of the 1999 MLB draft, and by the Orioles in the 32nd round (954th overall) of the 2000 MLB draft, but did not sign on both occasions. In 2006, he was called up from the Orioles' Triple-A affiliate, the Ottawa Lynx, when regular second baseman Brian Roberts went on the disabled list. On May 16, 2006, Fahey hit his first career home run off Boston Red Sox starting pitcher Curt Schilling.

On September 21, 2008, during the last game played at Yankee Stadium, Fahey entered the game as a pinch runner and remained in the game to play shortstop. He recorded the last ever error in the history of the original Yankee Stadium during the bottom of the seventh inning, allowing Xavier Nady to reach first base.

=== Toronto Blue Jays ===
On January 26, 2009, Fahey signed a minor league contract with the Toronto Blue Jays.

== See also ==
- List of second-generation Major League Baseball players
