= 2007 New York Yankees season =

Season for the Major League Baseball team the New York Yankees

2007 New York Yankees
- American League Wild Card winners
- League: American League
- Division: East
- Ballpark: Yankee Stadium
- City: New York
- Record: 94–68 (.580)
- Divisional place: 2nd
- Owners: George Steinbrenner
- General managers: Brian Cashman
- Managers: Joe Torre
- Television: YES Network; WWOR-TV (My 9)
- Radio: WCBS (AM); WQBU-FM (Spanish)

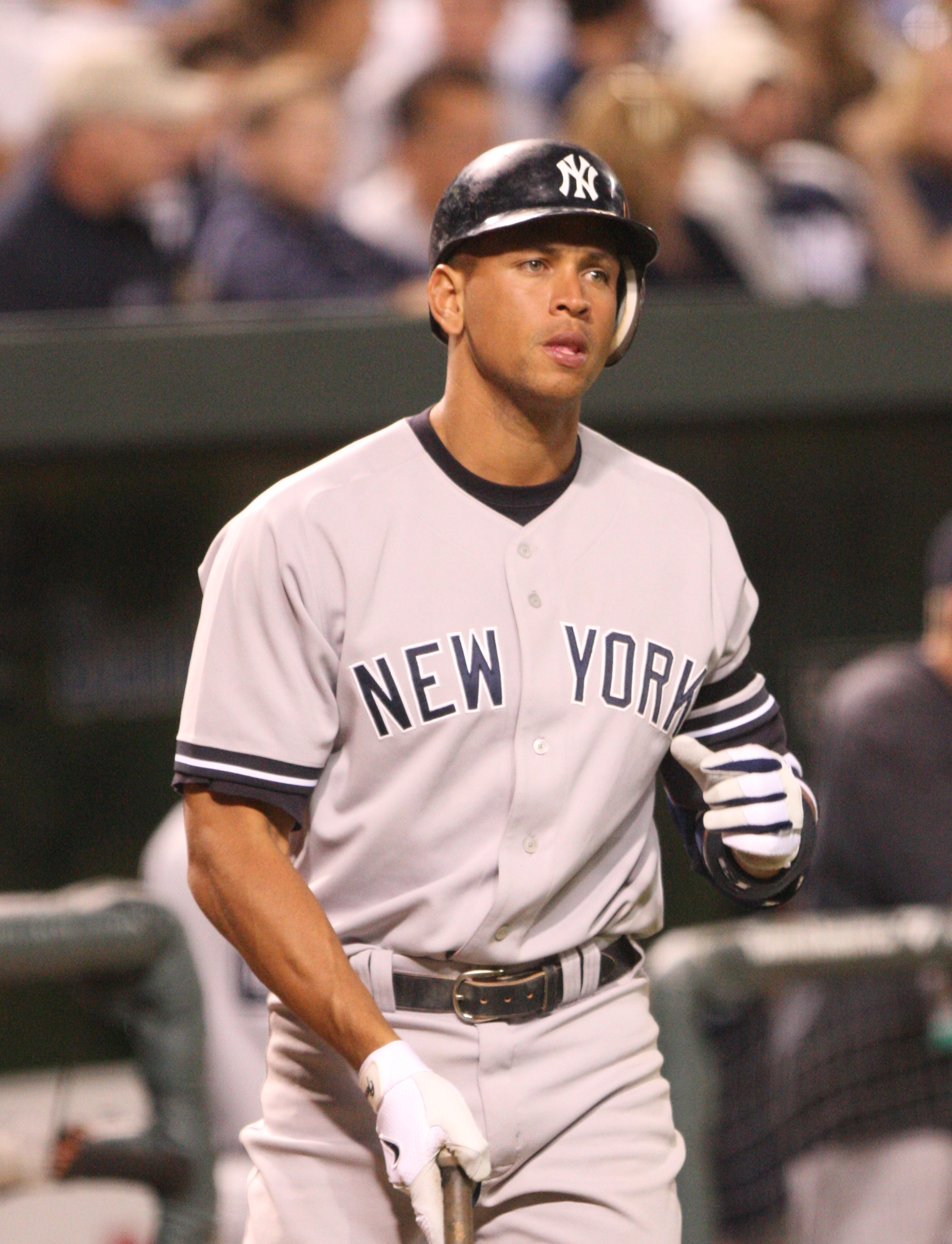
Yankees' third baseman Alex Rodriguez, 2007

The 2007 New York Yankees season was the 105th season for the New York Yankees franchise of Major League Baseball. Pursuing their tenth consecutive American League East championship in Joe Torre's final season as Yankees manager, they ultimately finished in second place behind the Boston Red Sox but still qualified for the postseason by beating out the Seattle Mariners and the Detroit Tigers for the American League wild card. The Yankees faced the Cleveland Indians in the American League Division Series, where they lost, three games to one.

== Offseason ==
The offseason started with news of the unexpected death of Cory Lidle, who was an occupant in his own plane that crashed into a Manhattan high rise shortly after the Yankees were eliminated in the 2006 ALDS. The Yankees made news by trading right fielder Gary Sheffield to the Detroit Tigers in exchange for pitching prospects. The Yankees also traded away pitcher Jaret Wright to the Baltimore Orioles in exchange for reliever Chris Britton. On December 21, 2006, Andy Pettitte signed as a free agent with the Yankees. However, no offseason move was bigger for the team than trading Randy Johnson back to the Arizona Diamondbacks, the team who he was with when he won the 2001 World Series against the Yankees, for pitcher Luis Vizcaíno and three minor league prospects. Joe Torre managed the team for the 12th consecutive season.

== Regular season ==
=== Season summary ===
==== April ====
Injuries sidelined starting pitchers Mike Mussina, Carl Pavano, and Chien-Ming Wang, leaving only original starters Andy Pettitte and Kei Igawa active. The team set a major league record with 10 different starters in the first 30 games, including a record 6 rookies. Even the rookie hurlers were not immune in the early going. Jeff Karstens was hit by a line drive off his first pitch on April 28, fracturing his right fibula. Phil Hughes pitched a hitless 6 1/3 innings against the Rangers on May 1 before leaving the game with a pulled hamstring. Closer Mariano Rivera blew 2 of his first 3 save opportunities and struggled in other appearances. Kei Igawa, acquired during the off-season for $46 million from Japan's Hanshin Tigers, allowed 26 earned runs in 6 appearances for an ERA of 7.63. He was then sent to the Tampa Yankees, the Single A affiliate of the Yankees.

Meanwhile, the offense led the American League in hits, home runs, and runs scored. Alex Rodríguez tied a record (set by Albert Pujols), by hitting 14 home runs in April. Nonetheless, the Yankees suffered a seven-game losing streak after sweeping the Cleveland Indians at Yankee Stadium and ended April with a record of 9–14, last place in the AL East and 6 1/2 games behind the Red Sox.

==== May ====
By early May, Mike Mussina and Chien-Ming Wang joined Andy Pettitte with newcomers Darrell Rasner and Matt DeSalvo filling in the remaining two positions in the rotation. Alex Rodriguez's remarkable April had come to an end, but the bats kept up their pace and, with the bullpen getting some needed rest, the Yankees began May 7–2. However, at the end of the month, the Yankees were tied for last place with the Devil Rays and were 22–29, 13 1/2 games behind the Red Sox in the AL East. On May 6, Roger Clemens announced his return to the Yankees after a three-year absence from the team.

==== June ====
The Yankees began June with a strong 8–2 start. They opened with a series victory over the Red Sox in Boston, including a game-winning home run by Alex Rodriguez off closer Jonathan Papelbon in the final game of the set with Boston. They were struck by injuries again that weekend, as Doug Mientkiewicz was injured in a collision at first with Mike Lowell and Roger Clemens's first start was delayed by a groin injury. Nonetheless, the Yankees took 3 of 4 from the White Sox heading into an interleague series with the Pirates. Roger Clemens made his season debut on June 9 and earned the victory. The Yankees swept the Pirates and took a 9-game winning streak, their longest since May 2005, into a subway series with the Mets. Roger Clemens pitched strongly in the series opener, but the Yankees were shut out 2–0. The Yankees would rebound and take the next game 11–8. Later that day, the Yankees received news that Kei Igawa would be ready to return to the Major Leagues. On July 1, they were 11 games behind the division-leading Red Sox and 8 games behind the Wild Card-leading Tigers.

==== July ====
The Yankees began the first week of July strongly. They lost the final game of a series with Oakland before taking 3 out of 4 from the Minnesota Twins and 2 of 3 from the Los Angeles Angels of Anaheim. Alex Rodriguez was injured during the series with Minnesota, suffering a strained left hamstring. He missed one game before returning to action that weekend against the Angels. After winning the weekend series with the Angels, the Yankees went into the break with a 42–43 record and a 10-game deficit in the division behind the Boston Red Sox. This is the first time since 1995 that the New York Yankees were under .500 before the All Star Break. After the break, the Yankees took three out of four games from the Toronto Blue Jays and the last place Tampa Bay Devil Rays, twice. In the month of July, the Yankees traded Scott Proctor for Wilson Betemit of the Los Angeles Dodgers. The Yankees also traded Jeff Kennard for Jose Molina.

==== August ====
The beginning of August saw the Yankees, along with all of Major League Baseball, eagerly awaiting home run number 500 from Alex Rodriguez. During the home run milestone chase George Steinbrenner's health once again came into question when the New York Post and the New York Daily News each reported that Steinbrenner, during a recent interview, appeared to be suffering from dementia.

[Steinbrenner] repeats, "Great to see ya", each time McEwen, 84, asks different questions about the Boss' family members. After gruffly responding to the Condé Nast reporter's question about the Yankees, he continues to repeat "Great to see ya", to each of McEwen's questions.

On August 4, 2007, during the first inning Alex Rodriguez hit his 500th career home run. Rodriguez became the youngest player ever to do so at 32 years, 8 days. On August 6, 2007, the Yankees cut relief pitcher Mike Myers and brought up Jim Brower. They had just completed a season sweep of the Cleveland Indians, winning all 6 games they played against them in 2007. This was a good start to the Yankees' upcoming tough schedule, where they played 17 games out of a 20-game span against playoff contenders. This included 8 games against the Detroit Tigers (4 at home, 4 at Detroit), 3 games against the Cleveland Indians, 3 games against the Los Angeles Angels of Anaheim, and 3 games against the Boston Red Sox.

August also saw rookie Phil Hughes rejoin the starting rotation, as well as the much anticipated debut of Joba Chamberlain, a future starter who gave the Yankees' bullpen some much needed help during the pennant race (an 0.38 ERA in 23.2 innings).

Hall of Fame Yankee shortstop Phil Rizzuto, who was also the long-time voice of the Yankees on television and radio, died on August 13. The Yankees wore his number 10 on their left sleeves for the remainder of the season.

The Yankees swept Boston at Yankee Stadium after dropping to eight games back in AL East standings. Coupled with losses by the Seattle Mariners, the Yankees' wins put them on top of the AL Wild Card race.

==== September ====
The Yankees' first game of September showcased rookie pitcher Ian Kennedy in his first career Major League start. Kennedy had replaced veteran Mike Mussina after Mussina had struggled in his previous three starts. Over seven innings pitched, Kennedy was charged with three runs, only one of which was earned, and the Yankees' offense was led by Alex Rodriguez's 45th home run of the season on the way to a 9–6 victory over the Tampa Bay Devil Rays. The game against the Boston Red Sox on September 14 was 4 hours and 43 minutes, 2 minutes short of a nine inning game record, which is held by the Yankees and Red Sox. While the Yankees lost the American League East title to the Boston Red Sox on September 27, the Yankees clinched the wild card berth and appeared in the postseason for a 13th straight year. They faced the AL Central champions, the Cleveland Indians, in the ALDS, losing the series three games to one.

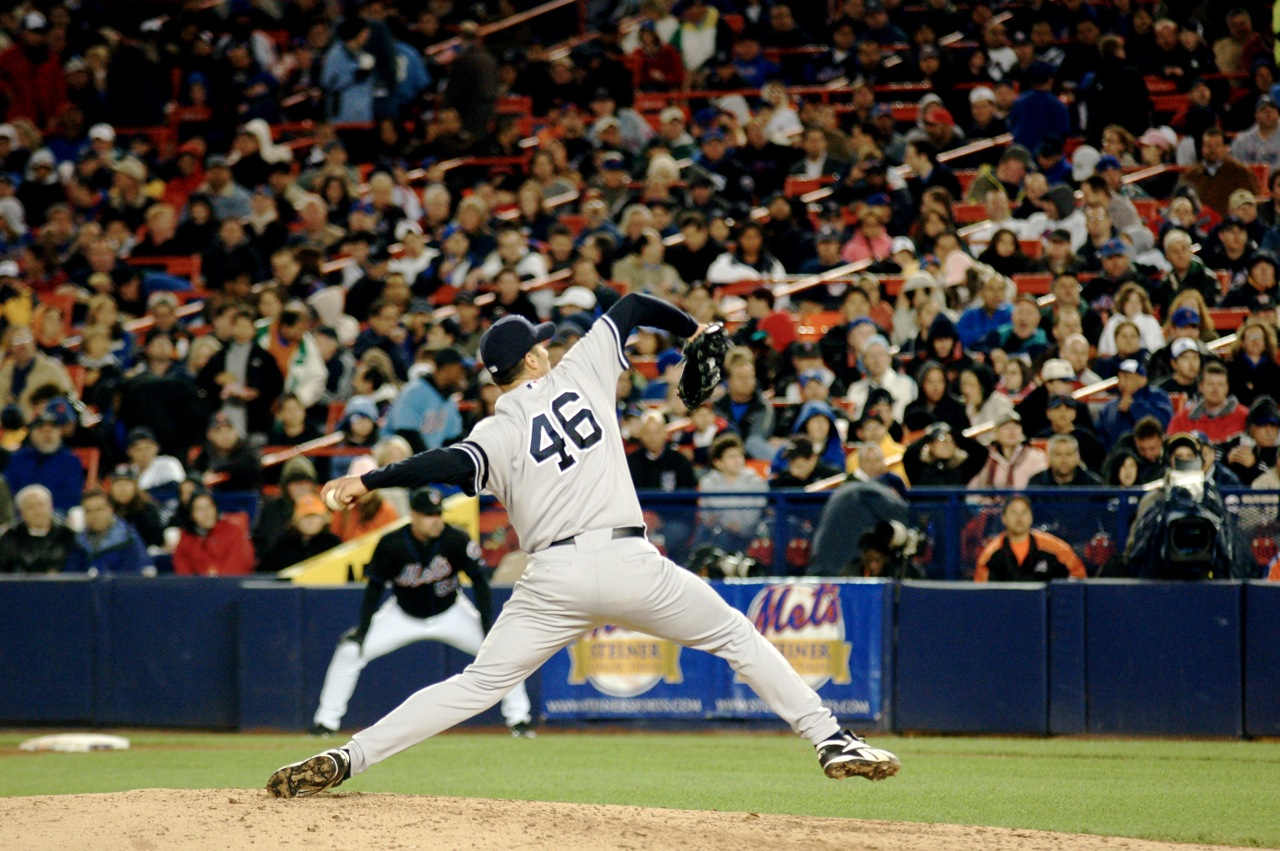
Andy Pettitte was one of the pitchers on the Yankees' 2007 roster.

=== Season standings ===
AL East
| Team | W | L | Pct. | GB | Home | Road |
|---|---|---|---|---|---|---|
| Boston Red Sox | 96 | 66 | .593 | — | 51‍–‍30 | 45‍–‍36 |
| New York Yankees | 94 | 68 | .580 | 2 | 52‍–‍29 | 42‍–‍39 |
| Toronto Blue Jays | 83 | 79 | .512 | 13 | 49‍–‍32 | 34‍–‍47 |
| Baltimore Orioles | 69 | 93 | .426 | 27 | 35‍–‍46 | 34‍–‍47 |
| Tampa Bay Devil Rays | 66 | 96 | .407 | 30 | 37‍–‍44 | 29‍–‍52 |

=== Record vs. opponents ===
2007 American League record Source: MLB Standings Grid – 2007
| Team | BAL | BOS | CWS | CLE | DET | KC | LAA | MIN | NYY | OAK | SEA | TB | TEX | TOR | NL |
|---|---|---|---|---|---|---|---|---|---|---|---|---|---|---|---|
| Baltimore | — | 6–12 | 5–3 | 3–4 | 1–5 | 7–0 | 3–7 | 0–7 | 9–9 | 4–4 | 2–7 | 11–7 | 4–6 | 8–10 | 6–12 |
| Boston | 12–6 | — | 7–1 | 5–2 | 3–4 | 3–3 | 6–4 | 4–3 | 8–10 | 4–4 | 4–5 | 13–5 | 6–4 | 9–9 | 12–6 |
| Chicago | 3–5 | 1–7 | — | 7–11 | 11–7 | 12–6 | 5–4 | 9–9 | 4–6 | 4–5 | 1–7 | 6–1 | 2–4 | 3–4 | 4–14 |
| Cleveland | 4–3 | 2–5 | 11–7 | — | 12–6 | 11–7 | 5–5 | 14–4 | 0–6 | 6–4 | 4–3 | 8–2 | 6–3 | 4–2 | 9–9 |
| Detroit | 5–1 | 4–3 | 7–11 | 6–12 | — | 11–7 | 3–5 | 12–6 | 4–4 | 4–6 | 6–4 | 3–4 | 5–4 | 4–3 | 14–4 |
| Kansas City | 0–7 | 3–3 | 6–12 | 7–11 | 7–11 | — | 5–2 | 9–9 | 1–9 | 6–4 | 3–6 | 4–3 | 5–4 | 3–4 | 10–8 |
| Los Angeles | 7–3 | 4–6 | 4–5 | 5–5 | 5–3 | 2–5 | — | 6–3 | 6–3 | 9–10 | 13–6 | 6–2 | 10–9 | 3–4 | 14–4 |
| Minnesota | 7–0 | 3–4 | 9–9 | 4–14 | 6–12 | 9–9 | 3–6 | — | 2–5 | 5–2 | 6–3 | 3–4 | 7–2 | 4–6 | 11–7 |
| New York | 9–9 | 10–8 | 6–4 | 6–0 | 4–4 | 9–1 | 3–6 | 5–2 | — | 2–4 | 5–5 | 10–8 | 5–1 | 10–8 | 10–8 |
| Oakland | 4–4 | 4–4 | 5–4 | 4–6 | 6–4 | 4–6 | 10–9 | 2–5 | 4–2 | — | 5–14 | 4–6 | 9–10 | 5–4 | 10–8 |
| Seattle | 7–2 | 5–4 | 7–1 | 3–4 | 4–6 | 6–3 | 6–13 | 3–6 | 5–5 | 14–5 | — | 4–3 | 11–8 | 4–5 | 9–9 |
| Tampa Bay | 7–11 | 5–13 | 1–6 | 2–8 | 4–3 | 3–4 | 2–6 | 4–3 | 8–10 | 6–4 | 3–4 | — | 5–4 | 9–9 | 7–11 |
| Texas | 6–4 | 4–6 | 4–2 | 3–6 | 4–5 | 4–5 | 9–10 | 2–7 | 1–5 | 10–9 | 8–11 | 4–5 | — | 5–5 | 11–7 |
| Toronto | 10–8 | 9–9 | 4–3 | 2–4 | 3–4 | 4–3 | 4–3 | 6–4 | 8–10 | 4–5 | 5–4 | 9–9 | 5–5 | — | 10–8 |

=== Roster ===
2007 New York Yankees
Roster
| Pitchers: 47 Colter Bean; 39 Chris Britton; 36 Jim Brower; 33 Brian Bruney; 62 Joba Chamberlain; 22 Roger Clemens; 19 Tyler Clippard; 61,14 Matt DeSalvo; 48 Kyle Farnsworth; 34 Sean Henn; 65 Phil Hughes; 29 Kei Igawa; 58,17 Jeff Karstens; 36 Ian Kennedy; 35 Mike Mussina; 36 Mike Myers; 60 Ross Ohlendorf; 45 Carl Pavano; 46 Andy Pettitte; 43 Scott Proctor; 31 Edwar Ramírez; 27 Darrell Rasner; 42 Mariano Rivera; 41 José Veras; 47 Ron Villone; 52 Luis Vizcaíno; 40 Chien-Ming Wang; 38 Chase Wright | Catchers: 26 José Molina; 26 Wil Nieves; 20 Jorge Posada; Infielders: 19 Chris Başak; 14 Wilson Betemit; 41 Miguel Cairo; 24 Robinson Canó; 25 Jason Giambi; 63 Alberto González; 2 Derek Jeter; 11 Doug Mientkiewicz; 31 Josh Phelps; 12 Andy Phillips; 13 Alex Rodriguez | Outfielders: 53 Bobby Abreu; 28 Melky Cabrera; 18 Johnny Damon; 17 Shelley Duncan; 55 Hideki Matsui; 64 Bronson Sardinha; 19 Kevin Thompson | Manager: 6 Joe Torre; Coaches: 50 Larry Bowa (third base); 49 Ron Guidry (pitching); 57 Joe Kerrigan (bullpen); 54 Kevin Long (hitting); 23 Don Mattingly (bench); 56 Tony Peña (first base) |

=== Game log ===
2007 game log
April

| # | Date | Opponent | Score | Win | Loss | Save | Attendance | Record |
|---|---|---|---|---|---|---|---|---|
| 1 | April 2 | Devil Rays | 9–5 | Vizcaíno (1–0) | Stokes (0–1) | | 55,035 | 1–0 |
| -- | April 4 | Devil Rays | Postponed (rain) Rescheduled for July 21 | | | | | 1–0 |
| 2 | April 5 | Devil Rays | 7–6 | Lugo (1–0) | Vizcaíno (1–1) | Reyes (1) | 52,096 | 1–1 |
| 3 | April 6 | Orioles | 6–4 | Loewen (1–0) | Mussina (0–1) | Ray (1) | 50,074 | 1–2 |
| 4 | April 7 | Orioles | 10–7 | Rivera (1–0) | Ray (0–1) | | 50,510 | 2–2 |
| 5 | April 8 | Orioles | 6–4 | Bédard (1–1) | Rasner (0–1) | Ray (2) | 47,679 | 2–3 |
| 6 | April 9 | @ Twins | 8–2 | Pavano (1–0) | Ponson (0–1) | | 26,047 | 3–3 |
| 7 | April 10 | @ Twins | 10–1 | Pettitte (1–0) | Bonser (0–1) | | 24,552 | 4–3 |
| 8 | April 11 | @ Twins | 5–1 | Ortiz (2–0) | Farnsworth (0–1) | | 30,131 | 4–4 |
| 9 | April 13 | @ Athletics | 5–4 (11) | Street (2–1) | Bruney (0–1) | | 35,077 | 4–5 |
| 10 | April 14 | @ Athletics | 4–3 (13) | Bruney (1–1) | DiNardo (0–1) | | 35,077 | 5–5 |
| 11 | April 15 | @ Athletics | 5–4 | Marshall (1–0) | Rivera (1–1) | | 35,077 | 5–6 |
| 12 | April 17 | Indians | 10–3 | Wright (1–0) | Westbrook (0–2) | | 38,438 | 6–6 |
| 13 | April 18 | Indians | 9–2 | Igawa (1–0) | Sowers (0–1) | | 41,379 | 7–6 |
| 14 | April 19 | Indians | 8–6 | Henn (1–0) | Borowski (0–1) | | 48,072 | 8–6 |
| 15 | April 20 | @ Red Sox | 7–6 | Snyder (1–0) | Rivera (1–2) | Okajima (1) | 36,786 | 8–7 |
| 16 | April 21 | @ Red Sox | 7–5 | Beckett (4–0) | Karstens (0–1) | Papelbon (5) | 36,342 | 8–8 |
| 17 | April 22 | @ Red Sox | 7–6 | Matsuzaka (2–2) | Proctor (0–1) | Papelbon (6) | 36,905 | 8–9 |
| 18 | April 23 | @ Devil Rays | 10–8 | Fossum (2–1) | Igawa (1–1) | | 20,409 | 8–10 |
| 19 | April 24 | @ Devil Rays | 6–4 | Salas (1–1) | Wang (0–1) | Reyes (7) | 22,328 | 8–11 |
| -- | April 25 | Blue Jays | Postponed (rain) Rescheduled for September 24 | | | | | 8–11 |
| 20 | April 26 | Blue Jays | 6–0 | Burnett (2–0) | Hughes (0–1) | | 45,118 | 8–12 |
| 21 | April 27 | Red Sox | 11–4 | Matsuzaka (3–2) | Pettitte (1–1) | | 55,005 | 8–13 |
| 22 | April 28 | Red Sox | 3–1 | Igawa (2–1) | Wakefield (2–3) | Rivera (1) | 55,026 | 9–13 |
| 23 | April 29 | Red Sox | 7–4 | Tavárez (1–2) | Wang (0–2) | Papelbon (8) | 54,856 | 9–14 |

May

| # | Date | Opponent | Score | Win | Loss | Save | Attendance | Record |
|---|---|---|---|---|---|---|---|---|
| 24 | May 1 | @ Rangers | 10–1 | Hughes (1–1) | Loe (1–2) | | 32,310 | 10–14 |
| -- | May 2 | @ Rangers | Postponed (rain) Rescheduled for May 3 | | | | | 10–14 |
| 25 | May 3 | @ Rangers | 4–3 | Vizcaíno (2–1) | Benoit (0–1) | Rivera (2) | ----- | 11–14 |
| 26 | May 3 | @ Rangers | 5–2 | Mussina (1–1) | Tejeda (3–2) | Rivera (3) | 40,671 | 12–14 |
| 27 | May 4 | Mariners | 15–11 | O'Flaherty (1–0) | Bean (0–1) | Putz (6) | 49,519 | 12–15 |
| 28 | May 5 | Mariners | 8–1 | Wang (1–2) | Weaver (0–5) | | 51,702 | 13–15 |
| 29 | May 6 | Mariners | 5–0 | Rasner (1–1) | Washburn (2–3) | | 52,553 | 14–15 |
| 30 | May 7 | Mariners | 3–2 | Sherrill (1–0) | Rivera (1–3) | Putz (7) | 47,424 | 14–16 |
| 31 | May 8 | Rangers | 8–2 | Pettitte (2–1) | Wood (2–1) | | 50,705 | 15–16 |
| 32 | May 9 | Rangers | 6–2 | Mussina (2–1) | Tejeda (3–3) | | 47,930 | 16–16 |
| 33 | May 10 | Rangers | 14–2 | McCarthy (2–4) | Wang (1–3) | | 52,147 | 16–17 |
| 34 | May 11 | @ Mariners | 3–0 | Washburn (3–3) | Rasner (1–2) | Putz (8) | 44,214 | 16–18 |
| 35 | May 12 | @ Mariners | 7–2 | DeSalvo (1–0) | M. Batista (3–3) | | 46,153 | 17–18 |
| 36 | May 13 | @ Mariners | 2–1 | Ramírez (3–2) | Pettitte (2–2) | Putz (9) | 46,181 | 17–19 |
| -- | May 15 | @ White Sox | Postponed (rain) Rescheduled for May 16 | | | | | 17–19 |
| 37 | May 16 | @ White Sox | 5–3 | Danks (2–4) | Mussina (2–2) | Thornton (1) | 30,953 | 17–20 |
| 38 | May 16 | @ White Sox | 8–1 | Wang (2–3) | Contreras (3–4) | | 34,609 | 18–20 |
| 39 | May 17 | @ White Sox | 4–1 | Garland (3–2) | DeSalvo (1–1) | Jenks (13) | 30,488 | 18–21 |
| 40 | May 18 | @ Mets | 3–2 | Pérez (5–3) | Pettitte (2–3) | B. Wagner (10) | 56,337 | 18–22 |
| 41 | May 19 | @ Mets | 10–7 | Glavine (5–1) | Rasner (1–3) | | 56,137 | 18–23 |
| 42 | May 20 | @ Mets | 6–2 | Clippard (1–0) | Maine (5–2) | | 56,438 | 19–23 |
| 43 | May 21 | Red Sox | 6–2 | Wang (3–3) | Wakefield (4–5) | | 55,078 | 20–23 |
| 44 | May 22 | Red Sox | 7–3 | Tavárez (2–4) | Mussina (2–3) | | 54,739 | 20–24 |
| 45 | May 23 | Red Sox | 8–3 | Pettitte (3–3) | Schilling (4–2) | | 55,000 | 21–24 |
| 46 | May 25 | Angels | 10–6 | Weaver (4–3) | Clippard (1–1) | | 50,363 | 21–25 |
| 47 | May 26 | Angels | 3–1 | Escobar (6–2) | Wang (3–4) | Rodríguez (15) | 52,536 | 21–26 |
| 48 | May 27 | Angels | 4–3 | Lackey (8–3) | Proctor (0–2) | Rodríguez (16) | 53,508 | 21–27 |
| 49 | May 28 | @ Blue Jays | 7–2 | McGowan (1–2) | DeSalvo (1–2) | | 28,791 | 21–28 |
| 50 | May 29 | @ Blue Jays | 3–2 | Accardo (1–0) | Pettitte (3–4) | | 30,116 | 21–29 |
| 51 | May 30 | @ Blue Jays | 10–5 | Clippard (2–1) | Litsch (1–2) | Rivera (4) | 29,187 | 22–29 |

June

| # | Date | Opponent | Score | Win | Loss | Save | Attendance | Record |
|---|---|---|---|---|---|---|---|---|
| 52 | June 1 | @ Red Sox | 9–5 | Wang (4–4) | Wakefield (5–6) | | 36,785 | 23–29 |
| 53 | June 2 | @ Red Sox | 11–6 | Okajima (1–0) | Proctor (0–3) | | 36,294 | 23–30 |
| 54 | June 3 | @ Red Sox | 6–5 | Bruney (2–1) | Papelbon (0–1) | Rivera (5) | 36,793 | 24–30 |
| 55 | June 4 | @ White Sox | 6–4 | Garland (4–3) | DeSalvo (1–3) | Jenks (16) | 32,703 | 24–31 |
| 56 | June 5 | @ White Sox | 7–3 | Clippard (3–1) | Buehrle (2–3) | Rivera (6) | 30,895 | 25–31 |
| 57 | June 6 | @ White Sox | 5–1 | Wang (5–4) | Vázquez (3–4) | | 30,829 | 26–31 |
| 58 | June 7 | @ White Sox | 10–3 | Proctor (1–3) | Contreras (4–6) | Rivera (7) | 32,688 | 27–31 |
| 59 | June 8 | Pirates | 5–4 (10) | Rivera (2–3) | Capps (3–3) | | 54,240 | 28–31 |
| 60 | June 9 | Pirates | 9–3 | Clemens (1–0) | Maholm (2–9) | | 54,296 | 29–31 |
| 61 | June 10 | Pirates | 13–6 | Henn (2–0) | Chacón (2–1) | | 54,292 | 30–31 |
| 62 | June 12 | D-backs | 4–1 | Wang (6–4) | Webb (6–4) | Rivera (8) | 51,577 | 31–31 |
| 63 | June 13 | D-backs | 7–2 | Mussina (3–3) | Hernández (5–4) | | 53,891 | 32–31 |
| 64 | June 14 | D-backs | 7–1 | Pettitte (4–4) | Davis (4–8) | | 53,712 | 33–31 |
| 65 | June 15 | Mets | 2–0 | Pérez (7–5) | Clemens (1–1) | Wagner (15) | 55,159 | 33–32 |
| 66 | June 16 | Mets | 11–8 | Vizcaíno (3–1) | Glavine (5–5) | | 55,064 | 34–32 |
| 67 | June 17 | Mets | 8–2 | Wang (7–4) | Hernández (3–3) | | 55,060 | 35–32 |
| 68 | June 19 | @ Rockies | 3–1 | Fogg (3–5) | Mussina (3–4) | Fuentes (19) | 48,077 | 35–33 |
| 69 | June 20 | @ Rockies | 6–1 | Francis (7–5) | Pettitte (4–5) | | 48,440 | 35–34 |
| 70 | June 21 | @ Rockies | 4–3 | López (4–0) | Clemens (1–2) | Fuentes (20) | 48,611 | 35–35 |
| 71 | June 22 | @ Giants | 7–3 | L. Vizcaíno (4–1) | Cain (2–8) | Rivera (9) | 43,425 | 36–35 |
| 72 | June 23 | @ Giants | 6–5 (13) | Chulk (2–2) | Proctor (1–4) | | 43,485 | 36–36 |
| 73 | June 24 | @ Giants | 7–2 | Lowry (7–6) | Mussina (3–5) | | 43,503 | 36–37 |
| 74 | June 26 | @ Orioles | 3–2 | Ray (4–5) | Proctor (1–5) | | 39,934 | 36–38 |
| 75 | June 27 | @ Orioles | 4–0 | Bédard (6–4) | Clemens (1–3) | | 35,776 | 36–39 |
| 76 | June 28 | @ Orioles | 8–7 * | Myers (1–0) | Parrish (2–1) | Rivera (10) | 40,737 | 37–39 |
| 77 | June 29 | Athletics | 2–1 | Mussina (4–5) | Kennedy (2–6) | Rivera (11) | 52,622 | 38–39 |
| 78 | June 30 | Athletics | 7–0 | Gaudin (7–3) | Igawa (2–2) | | 54,150 | 38–40 |
*Game suspended, completed July 27

July

| # | Date | Opponent | Score | Win | Loss | Save | Attendance | Record |
|---|---|---|---|---|---|---|---|---|
| 79 | July 1 | Athletics | 11–5 | Haren (10–2) | Pettitte (4–6) | | 54,266 | 38–41 |
| 80 | July 2 | Twins | 5–1 | Clemens (2–3) | Bonser (1–5) | | 53,036 | 39–41 |
| 81 | July 3 | Twins | 8–0 | Wang (8–4) | Silva (6–9) | | 53,862 | 40–41 |
| 82 | July 4 | Twins | 6–2 | Santana (10–6) | Mussina (4–6) | | 52,040 | 40–42 |
| 83 | July 5 | Twins | 7–6 | Farnsworth (1–1) | Neshek (3–1) | Rivera (12) | 52,471 | 41–42 |
| 84 | July 6 | Angels | 14–9 | Ramírez (1–0) | Bootcheck (2–2) | | 52,059 | 42–42 |
| 85 | July 7 | Angels | 2–1 (13) | Rodríguez (2–2) | Vizcaíno (4–2) | | 54,497 | 42–43 |
| 86 | July 8 | Angels | 12–0 | Wang (9–4) | Santana (5–10) | | 53,921 | 43–43 |
| 87 | July 12 | @ Devil Rays | 7–3 | Pettitte (5–6) | Shields (7–5) | | 21,907 | 44–43 |
| 88 | July 13 | @ Devil Rays | 6–4 | Kazmir (6–6) | Clemens (2–4) | Glover (2) | 29,803 | 44–44 |
| 89 | July 14 | @ Devil Rays | 6–4 | Wang (10–4) | Sonnanstine (1–4) | Rivera (13) | 36,048 | 45–44 |
| 90 | July 15 | @ Devil Rays | 7–6 | Vizcaíno (5–2) | Fossum (5–8) | Rivera (14) | 36,048 | 46–44 |
| 91 | July 16 | Blue Jays | 6–4 | Proctor (2–5) | Towers (4–6) | Rivera (15) | 52,993 | 47–44 |
| 92 | July 17 | Blue Jays | 3–2 (10) | Vizcaíno (6–2) | Janssen (2–2) | | 51,961 | 48–44 |
| 93 | July 18 | Blue Jays | 6–1 | Myers (2–0) | Marcum (5–4) | Rivera (16) | 52,147 | 49–44 |
| 94 | July 19 | Blue Jays | 3–2 | McGowan (6–5) | Wang (10–5) | Accardo (14) | 53,857 | 49–45 |
| 95 | July 20 | Devil Rays | 14–4 | Jackson (2–9) | Mussina (4–7) | | 53,957 | 49–46 |
| 96 | July 21 | Devil Rays | 7–3 | Vizcaíno (7–2) | Ryu (1–2) | | 54,412 | 50–46 |
| 97 | July 21 | Devil Rays | 17–5 | Vizcaíno (8–2) | Howell (1–4) | | 52,983 | 51–46 |
| 98 | July 22 | Devil Rays | 21–4 | Pettitte (6–6) | Shields (8–6) | | 54,751 | 52–46 |
| 99 | July 23 | @ Royals | 9–2 | Clemens (3–4) | Pérez (5–9) | | 30,746 | 53–46 |
| 100 | July 24 | @ Royals | 9–4 | Wang (11–5) | Elarton (2–4) | | 38,212 | 54–46 |
| 101 | July 25 | @ Royals | 7–1 | Mussina (5–7) | Meche (7–7) | | 28,460 | 55–46 |
| 102 | July 26 | @ Royals | 7–0 | de la Rosa (8–10) | Igawa (2–3) | | 37,036 | 55–47 |
| 103 | July 27 | @ Orioles | 4–2 | Guthrie (7–3) | Pettitte (6–7) | Bradford (1) | 47,952 | 55–48 |
| 104 | July 28 | @ Orioles | 7–5 | Burres (5–4) | Clemens (3–5) | Walker (3) | 48,402 | 55–49 |
| 105 | July 29 | @ Orioles | 10–6 | Wang (12–5) | Cabrera (7–11) | | 47,936 | 56–49 |
| 106 | July 31 | White Sox | 16–3 | Mussina (6–7) | Contreras (5–14) | | 53,958 | 57–49 |

August

| # | Date | Opponent | Score | Win | Loss | Save | Attendance | Record |
|---|---|---|---|---|---|---|---|---|
| 107 | August 1 | White Sox | 8–1 | Pettitte (7–7) | Danks (6–8) | | 53,342 | 58–49 |
| 108 | August 2 | White Sox | 13–9 | Logan (2–0) | Karstens (0–2) | | 54,869 | 58–50 |
| 109 | August 3 | Royals | 7–1 | Wang (13–5) | Pérez (6–10) | | 54,246 | 59–50 |
| 110 | August 4 | Royals | 16–8 | Myers (3–0) | Bale (0–1) | | 54,026 | 60–50 |
| 111 | August 5 | Royals | 8–5 | Mussina (7–7) | Meche (7–9) | Rivera (17) | 54,525 | 61–50 |
| 112 | August 6 | @ Blue Jays | 5–4 | Pettitte (8–7) | Downs (1–2) | Rivera (18) | 42,714 | 62–50 |
| 113 | August 7 | @ Blue Jays | 9–2 | Clemens (4–5) | Towers (5–9) | | 38,078 | 63–50 |
| 114 | August 8 | @ Blue Jays | 15–4 | Halladay (13–5) | Wang (13–6) | | 40,811 | 63–51 |
| 115 | August 10 | @ Indians | 6–1 | Hughes (2–1) | Carmona (13–7) | | 41,675 | 64–51 |
| 116 | August 11 | @ Indians | 11–2 | Mussina (8–7) | Byrd (10–5) | | 41,799 | 65–51 |
| 117 | August 12 | @ Indians | 5–3 | Pettitte (9–7) | Westbrook (3–7) | Rivera (19) | 41,612 | 66–51 |
| 118 | August 13 | Orioles | 7–6 | Rivera (3–3) | Bradford (1–5) | | 54,398 | 67–51 |
| 119 | August 14 | Orioles | 12–0 | Cabrera (9–12) | Karstens (0–3) | | 52,567 | 67–52 |
| 120 | August 15 | Orioles | 6–3 (10) | Bradford (2–5) | Rivera (3–4) | | 53,363 | 67–53 |
| 121 | August 16 | Tigers | 8–5 | Verlander (13–4) | Mussina (8–8) | | 53,914 | 67–54 |
| 122 | August 17 | Tigers | 6–1 | Pettitte (10–7) | Robertson (7–10) | | 54,290 | 68–54 |
| 123 | August 18 | Tigers | 5–2 | Clemens (5–5) | Durbin (7–6) | Rivera (20) | 54,702 | 69–54 |
| 124 | August 19 | Tigers | 9–3 | Wang (14–6) | Bonderman (10–6) | Ramírez (1) | 55,071 | 70–54 |
| 125 | August 20 | @ Angels | 7–6 (10) | Oliver (1–0) | Henn (2–1) | | 44,249 | 70–55 |
| 126 | August 21 | @ Angels | 18–9 | Escobar (14–6) | Mussina (8–9) | Gwyn (1) | 44,264 | 70–56 |
| 127 | August 22 | @ Angels | 8–2 | Pettitte (11–7) | Lackey (15–8) | | 44,326 | 71–56 |
| 128 | August 24 | @ Tigers | 9–6 (11) | Durbin (8–6) | Henn (2–2) | | 44,163 | 71–57 |
| 129 | August 25 | @ Tigers | 7–2 | Wang (15–6) | Bonderman (10–7) | | 44,250 | 72–57 |
| 130 | August 26 | @ Tigers | 5–4 | Seay (1–0) | Hughes (2–2) | Jones (33) | 43,268 | 72–58 |
| 131 | August 27 | @ Tigers | 16–0 | Verlander (14–5) | Mussina (8–10) | | 42,428 | 72–59 |
| 132 | August 28 | Red Sox | 5–3 | Pettitte (12–7) | Matsuzaka (13–11) | Rivera (21) | 55,037 | 73–59 |
| 133 | August 29 | Red Sox | 4–3 | Clemens (6–5) | Beckett (16–6) | Rivera (22) | 54,986 | 74–59 |
| 134 | August 30 | Red Sox | 5–0 | Wang (16–6) | Schilling (8–6) | | 55,067 | 75–59 |
| 135 | August 31 | Devil Rays | 9–1 | Sonnanstine (4–9) | Hughes (2–3) | | 53,275 | 75–60 |

September

| # | Date | Opponent | Score | Win | Loss | Save | Attendance | Record |
|---|---|---|---|---|---|---|---|---|
| 136 | September 1 | Devil Rays | 9–6 | Kennedy (1–0) | Jackson (4–13) | Rivera (23) | 53,637 | 76–60 |
| 137 | September 2 | Devil Rays | 8–2 | Hammel (2–4) | Pettitte (12–8) | | 53,957 | 76–61 |
| 138 | September 3 | Mariners | 7–1 | Hernández (11–7) | Clemens (6–6) | | 54,522 | 76–62 |
| 139 | September 4 | Mariners | 12–3 | Wang (17–6) | Ramírez (8–5) | | 52,487 | 77–62 |
| 140 | September 5 | Mariners | 10–2 | Chamberlain (1–0) | Washburn (9–13) | | 52,538 | 78–62 |
| 141 | September 7 | @ Royals | 3–2 | Farnsworth (2–1) | Musser (0–1) | Rivera (24) | 27,462 | 79–62 |
| 142 | September 8 | @ Royals | 11–5 | Pettitte (13–8) | Bannister (12–8) | | 35,518 | 80–62 |
| 143 | September 9 | @ Royals | 6–3 | Wang (18–6) | Duckworth (2–5) | Rivera (25) | 24,910 | 81–62 |
| 144 | September 11 | @ Blue Jays | 9–2 | Hughes (3–3) | Marcum (12–6) | | 30,472 | 82–62 |
| 145 | September 12 | @ Blue Jays | 4–1 | Mussina (9–10) | McGowan (10–9) | Rivera (26) | 27,082 | 83–62 |
| 146 | September 13 | @ Blue Jays | 2–1 | Downs (3–2) | Britton (0–1) | | 32,632 | 83–63 |
| 147 | September 14 | @ Red Sox | 8–7 | Bruney (3–1) | Papelbon (1–3) | Rivera (27) | 36,590 | 84–63 |
| 148 | September 15 | @ Red Sox | 10–1 | Beckett (19–6) | Wang (18–7) | | 36,215 | 84–64 |
| 149 | September 16 | @ Red Sox | 4–3 | Chamberlain (2–0) | Schilling (8–8) | Rivera (28) | 36,533 | 85–64 |
| 150 | September 17 | Orioles | 8–5 | Hughes (4–3) | Cabrera (9–17) | Rivera (29) | 52,548 | 86–64 |
| 151 | September 18 | Orioles | 12–0 | Mussina (10–10) | Leicester (2–2) | | 52,685 | 87–64 |
| 152 | September 19 | Orioles | 2–1 | Pettitte (14–8) | Burres (6–6) | Rivera (30) | 53,857 | 88–64 |
| 153 | September 21 | Blue Jays | 5–4 (14) | Kennedy (4–9) | Bruney (3–2) | Frasor (3) | 54,151 | 88–65 |
| 154 | September 22 | Blue Jays | 12–11 (10) | Karstens (1–3) | Towers (5–10) | | 54,887 | 89–65 |
| 155 | September 23 | Blue Jays | 7–5 | Mussina (11–10) | McGowan (11–10) | Chamberlain (1) | 54,983 | 90–65 |
| 156 | September 24 | Blue Jays | 4–1 | Litsch (7–9) | Pettitte (14–9) | Janssen (6) | 53,261 | 90–66 |
| 157 | September 25 | @ Devil Rays | 7–6 (10) | Glover (6–5) | Karstens (1–4) | | 24,503 | 90–67 |
| 158 | September 26 | @ Devil Rays | 12–4 | Wang (19–7) | Howell (1–6) | | 21,621 | 91–67 |
| 159 | September 27 | @ Devil Rays | 3–1 | Hughes (5–3) | Switzer (0–2) | Veras (1) | 28,962 | 92–67 |
| 160 | September 28 | @ Orioles | 10–9 (10) | Bradford (4–7) | Ramírez (1–1) | | 38,113 | 92–68 |
| 161 | September 29 | @ Orioles | 11–10 | Pettitte (15–9) | Cabrera (9–15) | Veras (2) | 47,616 | 93–68 |
| 162 | September 30 | @ Orioles | 10–4 | Wright (2–0) | Burres (6–8) | | 43,589 | 94–68 |

== Playoffs ==
=== ALDS vs. Cleveland Indians ===
2007 American League Division Series:

| Game | Score | Date | Starting Pitchers | Winning pitcher | Losing pitcher |
|---|---|---|---|---|---|
| 1 | New York 3 at Cleveland 12 | October 4 | Chien-Ming Wang vs. CC Sabathia | CC Sabathia (1–0) | Chien-Ming Wang (0–1) |
| 2 | New York 1 at Cleveland 2 | October 5 | Andy Pettitte vs. Fausto Carmona | Rafael Pérez (1–0) | Luis Vizcaíno (0–1) |
| 3 | Cleveland 4 at New York 8 | October 7 | Jake Westbrook vs. Roger Clemens | Phil Hughes (1–0) | Jake Westbrook (0–1) |
| 4 | Cleveland 6 at New York 4 | October 8 | Paul Byrd vs. Chien-Ming Wang | Paul Byrd (1–0) | Chien-Ming Wang (0–2) |

== End of an era ==
On October 14, 2007, George Steinbrenner relinquished control of the Yankees to his two sons, Hank and Hal Steinbrenner. The brothers took on control not only of the Yankees but also the YES Network and the construction of the new Yankee Stadium. "I'll pay more attention to the baseball part", Hank Steinbrenner said. "The stadium, that's more Hal. But basically everything will be decided jointly." Technically, the senior Steinbrenner was not completely gone. He had given himself a chairman-like position on the team. "George has taken on a role like the chairman of a major corporation", team president Randy Levine told the New York Post. "He's been saying for years he's wanted to get his sons involved in the family business. Both of them have stepped up and are taking on the day-to-day duties of what's required to run the Yankees."

After the Yankees were eliminated from the postseason, the fate of Joe Torre, the Yankees' manager since 1996, was in question. The team mulled what to do while speculation grew that Torre would not be brought back as manager. The team eventually offered him a contract that had a reduced salary with incentives, but Torre, who felt he was being treated unfairly even after his long tenure with the team, rejected the offer. He subsequently was hired by the Los Angeles Dodgers. The Yankees went on to hire Joe Girardi as Torre's replacement.

== Player stats ==
For complete stats click here (external link)

=== Batting ===
Note: G = Games played; AB = At bats; H = Hits; AVG = Batting average; HR = Home runs; RBI = Runs batted in

| Player | G | AB | H | AVG | HR | RBI |
|---|---|---|---|---|---|---|
| Bobby Abreu | 158 | 605 | 171 | .283 | 16 | 101 |
| Chris Başak | 5 | 1 | 0 | .000 | 0 | 0 |
| Wilson Betemit | 37 | 84 | 19 | .226 | 4 | 24 |
| Melky Cabrera | 150 | 545 | 149 | .273 | 8 | 73 |
| Miguel Cairo | 54 | 107 | 27 | .252 | 0 | 10 |
| Robinson Canó | 160 | 617 | 189 | .306 | 19 | 97 |
| Johnny Damon | 141 | 533 | 144 | .270 | 12 | 63 |
| Shelley Duncan | 34 | 74 | 19 | .257 | 7 | 17 |
| Jason Giambi | 83 | 254 | 60 | .236 | 14 | 39 |
| Alberto González | 12 | 14 | 1 | .071 | 0 | 1 |
| Derek Jeter | 156 | 639 | 206 | .322 | 12 | 73 |
| Hideki Matsui | 143 | 547 | 156 | .285 | 25 | 103 |
| Doug Mientkiewicz | 72 | 166 | 46 | .277 | 5 | 24 |
| José Molina | 29 | 66 | 21 | .318 | 1 | 9 |
| Wil Nieves | 26 | 61 | 10 | .164 | 0 | 8 |
| Josh Phelps | 36 | 80 | 21 | .263 | 2 | 12 |
| Andy Phillips | 61 | 185 | 54 | .292 | 2 | 25 |
| Jorge Posada | 144 | 506 | 171 | .338 | 20 | 90 |
| Alex Rodriguez | 158 | 583 | 183 | .314 | 54 | 156 |
| Bronson Sardinha | 10 | 9 | 3 | .333 | 0 | 2 |
| Kevin Thompson | 13 | 21 | 4 | .190 | 0 | 2 |
| Pitcher totals | 162 | 20 | 2 | .100 | 0 | 0 |
| Team totals | 162 | 5717 | 1656 | .290 | 201 | 929 |

=== Pitching ===
==== Starting and other pitchers ====
Note: G = Game pitched; IP = Innings pitched; W = Wins; L = Losses; ERA = Earned run average; SO = Strikeouts

| Player | G | IP | W | L | ERA | SO |
|---|---|---|---|---|---|---|
| Roger Clemens | 18 | 99.0 | 6 | 6 | 4.18 | 68 |
| *Tyler Clippard | 6 | 27.0 | 3 | 1 | 6.33 | 18 |
| Matt DeSalvo | 7 | 27.2 | 1 | 3 | 6.18 | 10 |
| Philip Hughes | 13 | 72.2 | 5 | 3 | 4.46 | 58 |
| Kei Igawa | 14 | 67.2 | 2 | 3 | 6.25 | 53 |
| Jeff Karstens | 7 | 14.2 | 1 | 4 | 11.05 | 5 |
| Ian Kennedy | 3 | 19.0 | 1 | 0 | 1.89 | 15 |
| Mike Mussina | 28 | 152.0 | 11 | 10 | 5.15 | 91 |
| *Carl Pavano | 2 | 11.1 | 1 | 0 | 4.76 | 4 |
| Andy Pettitte (1 HLD) | 36 | 215.1 | 15 | 9 | 4.05 | 141 |
| *Darrell Rasner | 6 | 24.2 | 1 | 3 | 4.01 | 11 |
| Chien-Ming Wang | 30 | 199.1 | 19 | 7 | 3.70 | 104 |
| *Chase Wright | 3 | 10.0 | 2 | 0 | 7.20 | 8 |

==== Relief pitchers ====
Note: G = Games pitched; IP = Innings pitched; SV = Saves; W = Wins; L = Losses; H = Holds; ERA = Earned run average; SO = Strikeouts

| Player | G | IP | W | L | H | SV | ERA | SO |
|---|---|---|---|---|---|---|---|---|
| *Colter Bean | 3 | 3.0 | 0 | 1 | 0 | 0 | 12.00 | 2 |
| Chris Britton | 11 | 12.2 | 0 | 1 | 0 | 0 | 3.55 | 5 |
| *Jim Brower | 3 | 3.1 | 0 | 0 | 1 | 0 | 13.50 | 1 |
| Brian Bruney | 58 | 50.0 | 3 | 2 | 6 | 0 | 4.68 | 39 |
| Joba Chamberlain | 19 | 24.0 | 2 | 0 | 8 | 1 | 0.38 | 34 |
| Kyle Farnsworth | 64 | 60.0 | 2 | 1 | 15 | 0 | 4.80 | 48 |
| Sean Henn | 29 | 36.2 | 2 | 2 | 2 | 0 | 7.12 | 28 |
| +Mike Myers | 55 | 40.2 | 3 | 0 | 4 | 0 | 2.66 | 21 |
| Ross Ohlendorf | 6 | 6.1 | 0 | 0 | 1 | 0 | 2.84 | 9 |
| +Scott Proctor | 52 | 54.1 | 2 | 5 | 11 | 0 | 3.81 | 37 |
| Edwar Ramírez | 21 | 21.0 | 1 | 1 | 3 | 1 | 8.14 | 31 |
| Mariano Rivera | 67 | 71.1 | 3 | 4 | 0 | 30 | 3.15 | 74 |
| José Veras | 9 | 9.1 | 0 | 0 | 1 | 2 | 5.79 | 7 |
| Ron Villone | 37 | 42.1 | 0 | 0 | 4 | 0 | 4.25 | 25 |
| Luis Vizcaíno | 77 | 75.1 | 8 | 2 | 13 | 0 | 4.30 | 62 |
| Team Pitching Totals | 162 | 1450.2 | 94 | 68 | 70 | 34 | 4.49 | 1009 |

*Ended season not on active roster
+ Ended season playing for different team

== Awards and honors ==
All-Star Game

- Alex Rodriguez, 3B, Starter
- Derek Jeter, SS, Starter
- Jorge Posada, C, Reserve

== Farm system ==
| Level | Team | League | Manager |
|---|---|---|---|
| AAA | Scranton/Wilkes-Barre Yankees | International League | Dave Miley |
| AA | Trenton Thunder | Eastern League | Tony Franklin |
| A | Tampa Yankees | Florida State League | Luis Sojo |
| A | Charleston RiverDogs | South Atlantic League | Torre Tyson |
| A-Short Season | Staten Island Yankees | New York–Penn League | Mike Gillespie |
| Rookie | GCL Yankees | Gulf Coast League | Jody Reed |

LEAGUE CHAMPIONS: GCL Yankees
