= Christopher Britton =

Christopher Britton may refer to:

- Chris Britton (baseball) (born 1982), Major League Baseball relief pitcher
- Christopher Britton (actor) (born 1961), Canadian actor and voice actor
- Chris Britton of The Troggs
