= Chris Başak =

American baseball player (born 1978)

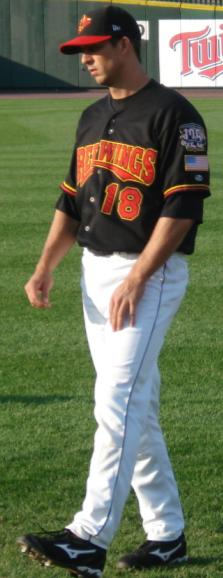
- Basak with the Rochester Red Wings
- Infielder
- Born: December 6, 1978 (age 47); North Platte, Nebraska, U.S.
- Batted: Right Threw: Right

MLB debut
- June 9, 2007, for the New York Yankees

Last MLB appearance
- July 31, 2007, for the New York Yankees

MLB statistics
- Batting average: .000
- At bats: 1
- Stats at Baseball Reference

Teams
- New York Yankees (2007)

Christopher Joseph Başak (born December 6, 1978) is an American former professional baseball infielder. He played in Major League Baseball (MLB) for the New York Yankees in 2007. During his career, he played in the Yankees, New York Mets, and Minnesota Twins organizations. Başak made five appearances for the Yankees, receiving one at-bat.

== Career ==
Başak grew up in Joliet, Illinois, and attended Minooka High School in Minooka, Illinois. He then attended the University of Illinois, where he played college baseball as a shortstop for the Illinois Fighting Illini.

The New York Mets selected Başak in the sixth round, with the 185th overall selection, of the 2000 Major League Baseball draft. He hit .265 in his minor league career up until 2006, and had 161 stolen bases in 814 games. He mostly played shortstop. He signed with the Yankees in the 2006-07 offseason, and in the following spring training he hit .311.

Capable of playing any infield position, Başak played left and right field for the Scranton/Wilkes-Barre Yankees, the Yankees' Triple-A affiliate, where he led the team in doubles and was second in stolen bases. He was called up to the Yankees on June 6, 2007. He saw his first action on June 9, pinch running for, and subsequently replacing, third baseman Alex Rodriguez. On June 24, he got his first at bat, hitting a line drive that was caught by Barry Bonds. After playing sparingly, he was optioned back to Scranton/Wilkes-Barre on July 1, and replaced by Edwar Ramirez.

On July 27, the Yankees called up Başak from Triple-A, as Kei Igawa was optioned down. Başak was optioned back to Scranton/Wilkes-Barre on August 1. On August 15, he was designated for assignment to make room on the 40-man roster for Andrew Brackman. On August 16, 2007, he was claimed off waivers by the Twins. He played for the Twins' Triple-A affiliate, the Rochester Red Wings, and Scranton/Wilkes-Barre during the 2008 season. He got claimed off waivers by New York during the season. He retired after the 2008 season.
