= Edwar Ramírez =

Dominican baseball player (born 1981)

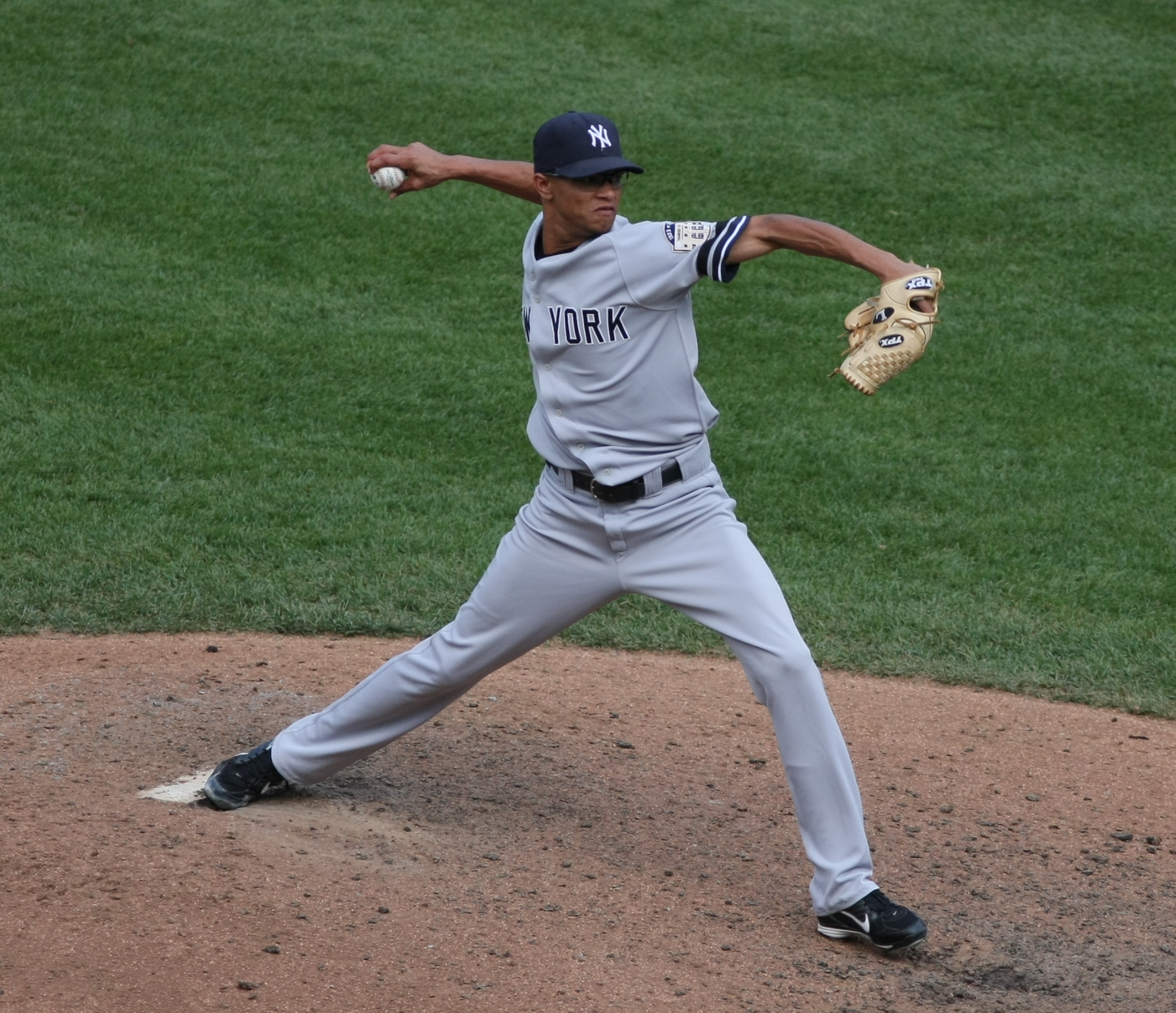
- Ramírez with the New York Yankees
- Pitcher
- Born: 28 March 1981 (age 45); El Cercado, Dominican Republic
- Batted: Right Threw: Right

MLB debut
- 3 July, 2007, for the New York Yankees

Last MLB appearance
- 12 May, 2010, for the Oakland Athletics

MLB statistics
- Win–loss record: 7–2
- Earned run average: 5.19
- Strikeouts: 126
- Stats at Baseball Reference

Teams
- New York Yankees (2007–2009); Oakland Athletics (2010)

Edwar Emilio Ramírez (born 28 March 1981) is a Dominican former professional baseball pitcher. Ramírez appeared in Major League Baseball (MLB) as a relief pitcher for the New York Yankees (2007–2009) and Oakland Athletics (2010). After finding himself out of baseball in 2004, Ramírez revitalized his career by developing an effective changeup.

Originally a member of the Los Angeles Angels of Anaheim organization, Ramírez pitched for the Angels only in minor league baseball. The Angels released Ramírez before the 2004 season. After spending the next year mastering a changeup, he spent parts of the following two seasons in independent league baseball. Ramírez signed with the Yankees in 2006, and made his MLB debut the next season. Ramírez enjoyed success and popularity among the fan base during the 2007 and 2008 seasons. He struggled in 2009, and pitched for the Athletics early in the 2010 season before returning to minor league baseball in the Athletics organization. He pitched in the Mexican League in 2011.

== Career ==
=== Los Angeles Angels of Anaheim: 2001–2005 ===
The Los Angeles Angels of Anaheim signed Ramírez as an international free agent in February 2001. He made his professional debut in minor league baseball with the Arizona Angels of the Rookie-level Arizona League in the 2002 season. He pitched in 13 games for Arizona, and also pitched in two games for the Provo Angels of the Rookie-level Pioneer League. The Angels promoted Ramírez to Class A in the 2003 season. He pitched for the Cedar Rapids Kernels in the Class A Midwest League. He reached the Rancho Cucamonga Quakes of the Class A-Advanced California League. When the Angels invited players of the Quakes to Angel Stadium in Anaheim, Ramírez refused to leave the bleachers and step on the field unless he was invited to play for the Angels.

Ramírez had difficulty with his vision; he could not see which pitch the catcher was calling for. He was fitted for prescription goggles, which he continued to wear throughout his career. Yankees backup catcher Jose Molina would later admit that he didn't remember Ramírez from their shared years in the Angels' organization.

The Angels released Ramírez in March 2004, without being promoted beyond the Class A level. Disappointed, Ramírez considered retiring from baseball. With the advice of his father, Ramírez decided that, since pitchers often relied on a slider or curveball as a complementary pitch to their fastball, he would develop a different pitch. Ramírez spent his time that year learning a changeup on baseball fields in Miami, Florida, and did not pitch professionally during the 2004 season. Working with Maximo Soto, a fellow minor league pitcher released by the Angels, Ramírez developed his changeup to provide him with a new weapon in his pitching arsenal.

=== Independent leagues: 2005–2006 ===
Ramírez played independent league baseball for the next two seasons. After receiving an invitation to try out for the Pensacola Pelicans of the American Association of Independent Professional Baseball, the Pelicans signed Ramirez for the 2005 season. In 43 games with Pensacola, Ramírez pitched to a 1.45 earned run average (ERA), struck out 93 batters and walked only 15. He finished the season with a record of 2–2 with 11 saves over 62 innings pitched. In September 2005, the Angels purchased Ramírez from the Pelicans. He pitched in one game for their Class AAA affiliate, the Salt Lake Stingers of the Pacific Coast League (PCL). The Angels released Ramírez in spring training in 2006. Ramírez was not provided with a reason for his release.

Ramirez signed with the Edinburg Coyotes of the independent United League Baseball for the 2006 season. He served as the Coyotes' closer. With Edinburg, he threw 25 1/3 innings of relief over 25 games, finishing with a 1–1 record and 16 saves. He also had 46 strikeouts, 10 walks and a 1.07 ERA. He appeared in the United League All-Star Game.

=== New York Yankees: 2007–2009 ===
Searching for a pitcher recently released by an MLB organization to fill a relief pitching role in Class A, Yankees professional scouting director Billy Eppler purchased Ramírez from Edinburg for an unreported amount of cash, estimated to be between $1,500 to $3,000. It was the first time a United League player was purchased by an MLB organization. Ramírez signed with the Yankees on 9 July 2006. Later that July, the Yankees purchased Carlos Mendoza from the Pelicans. Ramírez pitched for the Tampa Yankees, their Class A-Advanced affiliate of the Florida State League, for the remainder of the 2006 season. He pitched 32 2/3 innings, compiled a 4–1 win–loss record, 1.17 earned run average (ERA), and 47 strikeouts.

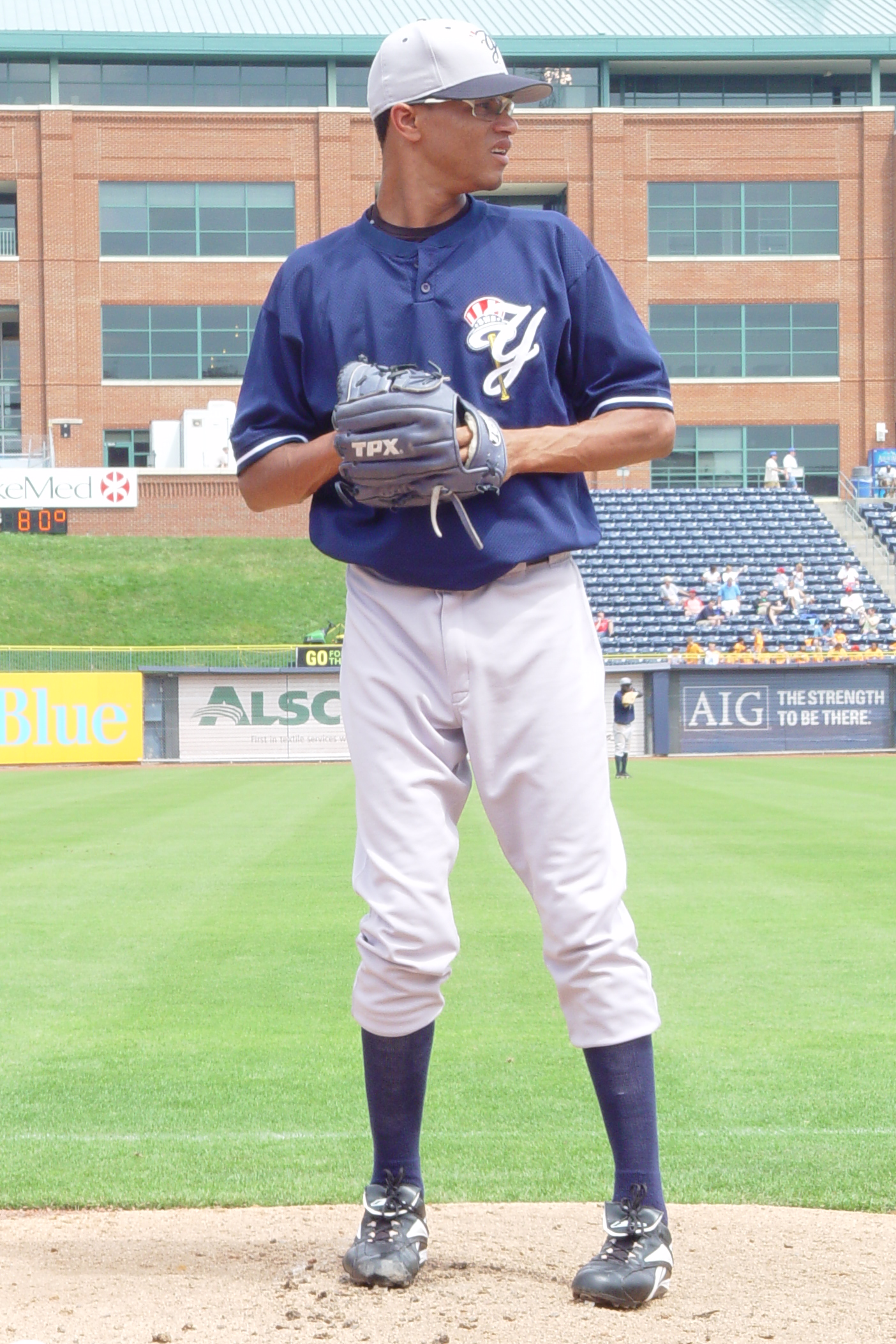
Ramírez with the Scranton/Wilkes-Barre Yankees

He began the 2007 season with the Yankees' Class AA affiliate, the Trenton Thunder of the Eastern League. In nine relief appearances, he had a record of 3–0 and one save, allowing only one run in 16 2/3 innings, for an ERA of 0.54. He compiled 33 strikeouts and eight walks. He was promoted to the Scranton/Wilkes-Barre Yankees of the Class AAA International League, where he pitched 26 2/3 innings of relief in 15 games, allowing only two runs over that span while striking out 47 strikeouts and walking nine.

Ramírez was called up to the Yankees, his first promotion to MLB, on 1 July 2007. He made his MLB debut on 3 July against the Minnesota Twins, pitching the ninth inning. He struck out all three batters he faced, including reigning American League Most Valuable Player Justin Morneau, in an 8–0 win for the Yankees. The last Yankee to strike out the side in his MLB debut was Stan Bahnsen during the 1966 season. The only other rookies to strike out the side in their debut inning are Tyler Robertson, Jordan De Jong, Todd Wellemeyer, Jeremy Fikac, Braden Looper, Angelo LiPetri, and Paul Giel.

Ramírez remained with the club for nearly three weeks. However, Yankees' manager Joe Torre had a reputation for preferring veteran relief pitchers and used Ramírez sparingly. On 6 July, against the Angels, he gave up one run on two hits in 1 1/3 innings; as the pitcher of record, he was awarded his first career win in the 14–9 Yankees victory.

In just his third relief appearance with the major league club, he faced the Tampa Bay Devil Rays on 20 July. Without an appearance since 6 July in Anaheim, he was pitching on two weeks of rest. Without control of his pitches, Ramírez walked four batters and allowed a grand slam to Dioner Navarro without recording an out. Only two of his 19 pitches were called strikes. After the game, Ramírez, shaken by his performance, cut short his comments to reporters, and was seen crying at his locker. The Yankees optioned Ramírez back to Scranton/Wilkes-Barre the following day. In his first appearance with Scranton/Wilkes Barre following his demotion, Ramírez continued pitching effectively, striking out two in 1 1/3 hitless innings, helping Joba Chamberlain hold onto his first career Class AAA victory.

"It's an amazing story, given the fact we got him out of an indy league. We thought maybe he can help us in Double-A [this season]. We sorely underestimated what he was capable of, the numbers he put up are hard to believe."

— Yankees Senior Vice President of Baseball Operations Mark Newman

Between Trenton and Scranton, Ramírez pitched 56 2/3 innings, in which he allowed 26 hits and 22 walks while striking out 102. He held opponents to a .135 batting average and allowed only five earned runs, good for a 0.79 ERA. For his performance, Ramírez was named the Minor League Baseball Reliever of the Year for the 2007 season.

After the conclusion of the minor league season, Ramírez was recalled by the Yankees on 15 August. He struck out three Baltimore Orioles in 2 1/3 scoreless innings in his return. The success of Ramírez and Joba Chamberlain in the bullpen convinced Yankees general manager Brian Cashman that he had enough relief pitching depth to trade Scott Proctor for Wilson Betemit. On 19 August 2007, Ramírez earned his first save in MLB, in a game against the Detroit Tigers, with two hitless innings, striking out the side in the eighth inning, and remaining in the game to pitch the bottom of the ninth.

Yankees closer Mariano Rivera took Ramírez and fellow reliever José Veras under his wing, mentoring the two in the Yankee bullpen during games. Rivera instructed Ramírez to use his fastball more and save his changeup for key situations. Ramírez started the 2008 season in Scranton/Wilkes-Barre. He was recalled on 18 April, but was optioned back a day later. He was called up again on 29 April. He did not give up a run at any level of baseball through 31 May, a total of thirteen consecutive appearances. On 30 July, in a game against the Orioles, Ramírez intentionally threw a pitch in the area of Kevin Millar's head during the top of the seventh inning; in response, Daniel Cabrera threw a fastball near Alex Rodriguez's head in the eighth inning. Ramírez was suspended three games, while Cabrera was suspended six games. On the season, his 10.25 strikeouts per inning ratio was seventh-best among American League relievers.

Off of the strength of his 2008 season, the Dominican Republic national baseball team offered Ramírez the opportunity to pitch for his country in the 2009 World Baseball Classic. However, Yankees' manager Joe Girardi indicated that Ramírez was in competition for a middle-relief job, and Ramírez focused on his chances of making the Yankees' roster, declining the invitation and remaining in camp with the Yankees. In February, Ramírez suffered shoulder bursitis, which was initially considered mild. Ramírez underwent an MRI on his right shoulder during spring training. He made the Yankees' Opening Day roster, but disappointed with poor results. Ramírez pitched to a 5.19 ERA in 15 games, allowing 15 walks in 17 1/3 innings. On 19 May 2009, Ramírez was optioned to Scranton/Wilkes-Barre to make room on the roster for pitcher Brian Bruney, who was activated off of the disabled list.

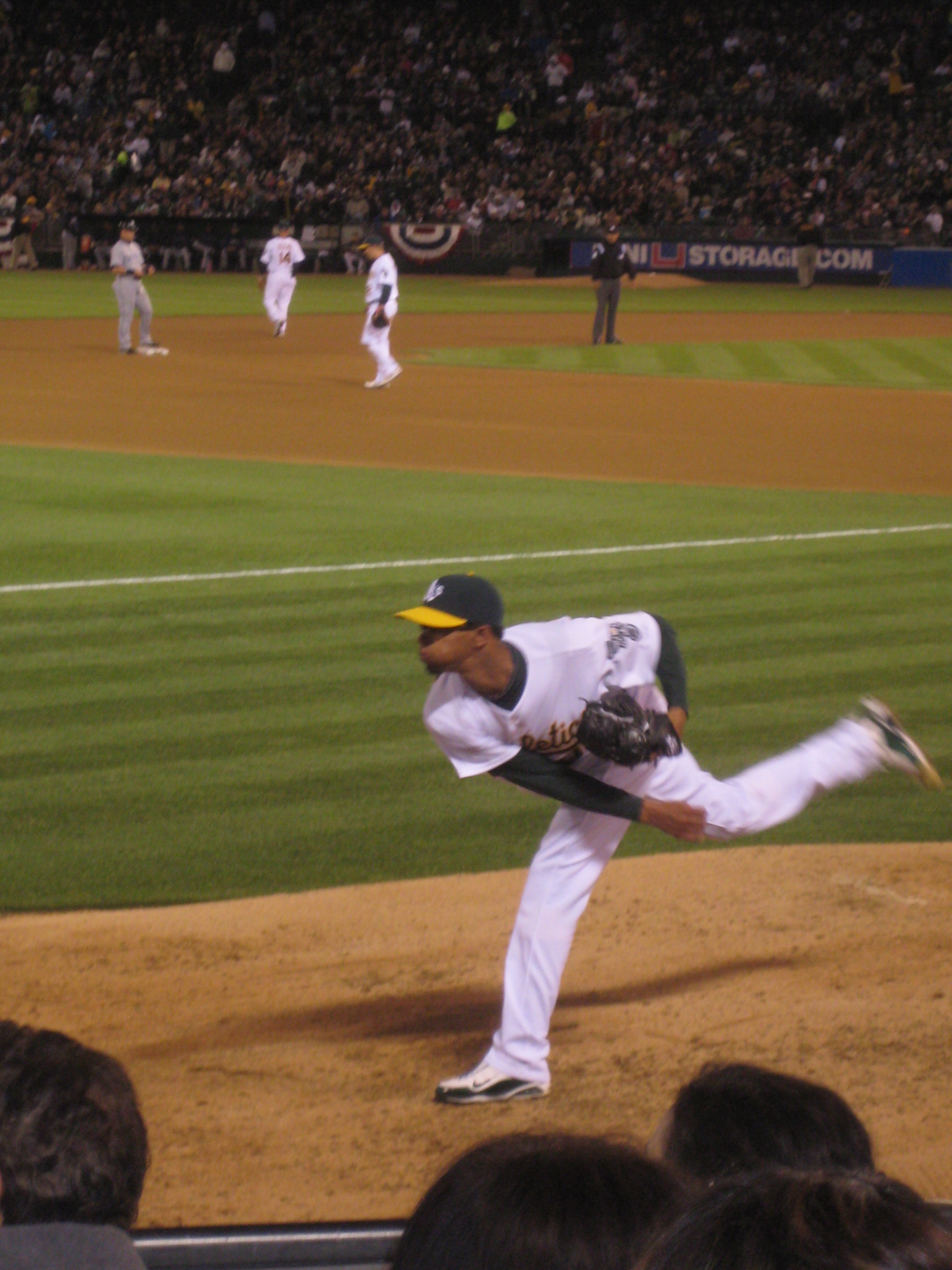
Ramírez warming up in the bullpen for the Athletics

Ramírez pitched for Scranton/Wilkes-Barre for the remainder of the International League season, finishing with a 1–5 record and 3.19 ERA in 29 games. Ramírez was promoted to the Yankees when MLB rosters expanded on 1 September. He was expected to absorb some of the workload in the bullpen, helping to spare the overworked Alfredo Aceves, Phil Hughes, Phil Coke, and Dámaso Marte. Towards the end of the season, he was only used in blowout games as a result of his ineffectiveness. Ramírez finished the season with a 5.73 ERA, allowing fourteen earned runs in 22 innings; though he did strike out exactly one batter per inning, he also issued too many walks as he struggled with consistency. Though Ramírez did not appear in the 2009 postseason with the Yankees, the organization did present him with a 2009 World Series ring.

During spring training in 2010, the Yankees signed pitcher Chan Ho Park to a one-year contract. To make room for Park on their roster, Ramírez was designated for assignment by the Yankees on 28 February 2010.

=== Texas Rangers: 2010 ===
On March 9, 2010, Ramirez was traded to the Texas Rangers in exchange for cash considerations.

=== Oakland Athletics: 2010 ===
After the Oakland Athletics suffered injuries during spring training to relief pitchers Andrew Bailey, Michael Wuertz, and Craig Breslow, the Athletics traded infielder Gregorio Petit to the Rangers in exchange for Ramírez on 24 March.

Ramírez began the 2010 season with the Athletics on their opening day roster. In his first six appearances, Ramírez recorded 4.50 ERA. He was optioned to Triple-A on 27 April. The Athletics recalled Ramírez on 7 May and he made his seventh appearance on 12 May against Texas, allowing one run on two hits and two walks in one inning. After the game, he was designated for assignment. He was outrighted to the Sacramento River Cats on 21 May. He spent the rest of the season in the minors.

=== Leones de Yucatán: 2011 ===
On May 20, 2011, Ramírez signed with the Leones de Yucatán of the Mexican League. Leones activated him on 21 May, and he made his first appearance for Yucatán the next day. He was released on June 20. In 11 games 8.2 innings he struggled horribly going 1–2 with a 10.38 ERA with 9 strikeouts and 1 save.

== Coaching career ==
Ramirez has since returned to the Yankees organization as a coach. He has served as pitching coach for the Yankees Dominican Summer League team since 2019.

== Scouting Report ==
At 6 feet 3 inches (1.91 m) and 150 pounds (68 kg), Torre once compared Ramírez's appearance to a thermometer. Ramírez primarily throws a fastball with slight lateral movement that averages 91 miles per hour (146 km/h). He also has two offspeed pitches: a standard changeup, and a low 80s circle changeup, his primary strikeout pitch, that has similar movement to a palmball, and is particularly effective against left-handed batters. The changeup, Ramírez said, gave the fastball the appearance of being as fast as 98 miles per hour (158 km/h). He developed a low 80s slider into his repertoire. His delivery was unusual, making it difficult to pick up the ball out of his hand.

== Personal life ==
Ramírez is from the Dominican Republic. He was born in El Cercado, and raised in Brecon. He is the only MLB player from El Cercado. Ramírez's father resides in the Dominican Republic.
