= Kei Igawa =

Japanese baseball player (born 1979)

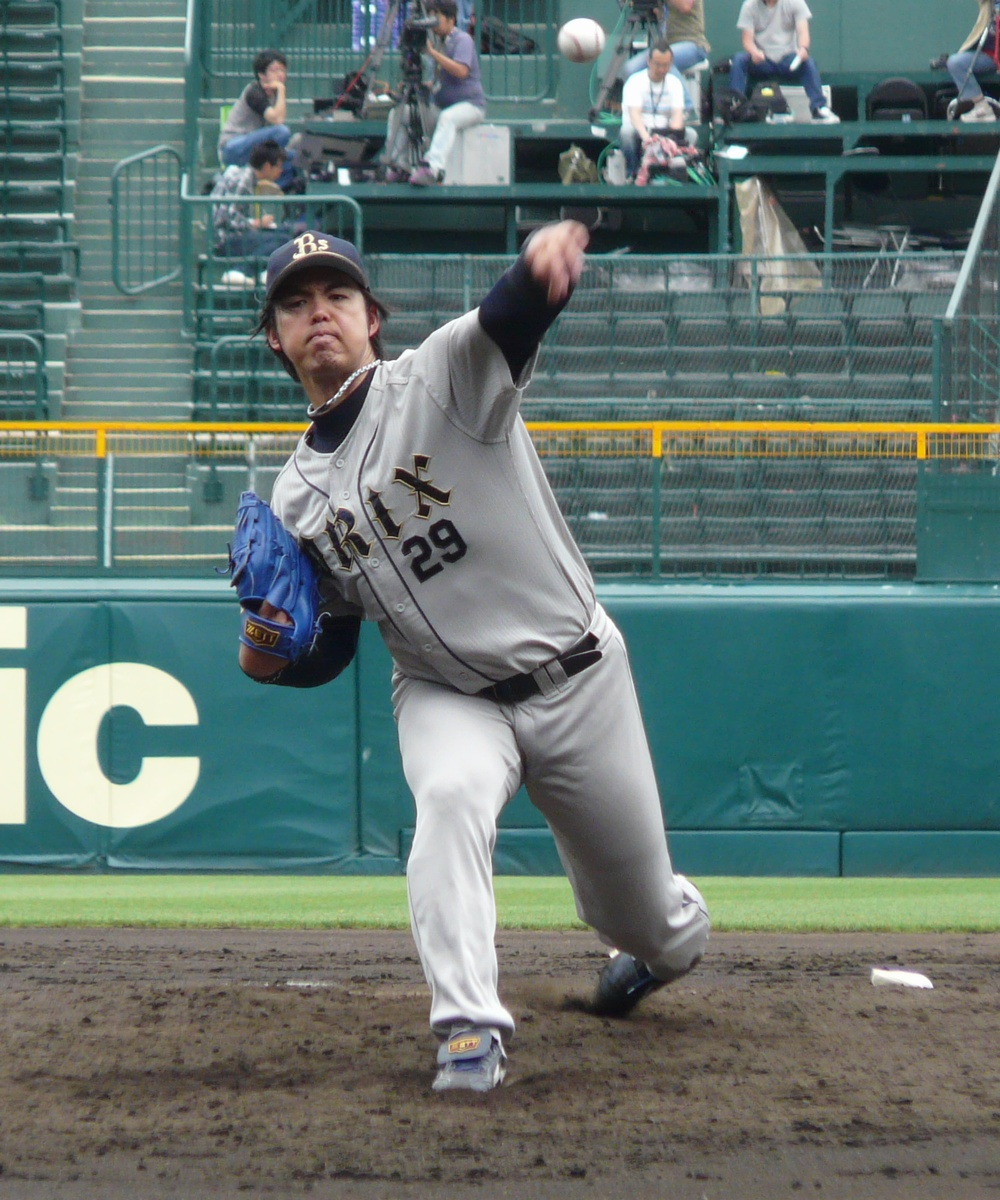
- Igawa pitching for the Orix Buffaloes at Hanshin Koshien Stadium
- Pitcher
- Born: July 13, 1979 (age 47); Ōarai, Ibaraki, Japan
- Batted: Left Threw: Left

Professional debut
- NPB: May 2, 1999, for the Hanshin Tigers
- MLB: April 7, 2007, for the New York Yankees

Last appearance
- MLB: June 27, 2008, for the New York Yankees
- NPB: 2014, for the Orix Buffaloes

NPB statistics
- Win–loss record: 93–72
- Earned run average: 3.21
- Strikeouts: 1279

MLB statistics
- Win–loss record: 2–4
- Earned run average: 6.66
- Strikeouts: 53
- Stats at Baseball Reference

Teams
- Hanshin Tigers (1998–2006); New York Yankees (2007–2008); Orix Buffaloes (2012–2014)

Career highlights and awards
- NPB: Central League MVP (2003); Eiji Sawamura Award (2003); Best Nine Award (2003); NPB wins leader (2003); NPB ERA leader (2003); 3× NPB strikeout leader (2002, 2004, 2006); no-hitter (October 4, 2004)

Kei Igawa (井川 慶, Igawa Kei; born July 13, 1979) is a Japanese former left-handed pitcher. He played for the Hanshin Tigers and Orix Buffaloes of Nippon Professional Baseball (NPB) and New York Yankees of Major League Baseball (MLB). He led all pitchers in the Central League for strikeouts in 2002, 2004 and 2006. He also played in the 2006 Major League Baseball Japan All-Star Series.

== Professional career ==
=== Hanshin Tigers (1998–2006) ===
He was the number two draft choice of the Hanshin Tigers in 1998. After a couple of years in the Hanshin minor league system, Igawa entered the starting rotation in 2001. In his first full season as a starter, Igawa went 9–13 for the last-placed Tigers, but finished with a Central League second-best 2.67 ERA, behind only Chunichi's Shigeki Noguchi.

In 2002, Hanshin improved to fourth, and Igawa's record was 14–9. He finished third in ERA (2.49), trailing Masumi Kuwata and Kenshin Kawakami. He also led the Central League with 206 strikeouts.

In 2003, the Tigers won the Central League pennant. Igawa made a great contribution with his brilliant performance. He pitched very well and finished with a 20–5 record, a 2.80 ERA, and was third with 179 strikeouts. He was named to the Best Nine, won the MVP in the Central League and also won the Eiji Sawamura Award, the Japanese equivalent of the MLB Cy Young Award.

Igawa saw a decline in performance in 2004 and 2005. In 2004, despite leading the league at 228 strikeouts, he went 14–11 with a 3.73 ERA. In 2005, Igawa went 13–9 with a 3.86 ERA, fifth among his team's starters in ERA. He was only tied for fifth in strikeouts (down significantly to 145) and 10th in ERA, and led the Central League in hits allowed (199).

=== New York Yankees (2007–2011) ===
==== 2007 ====
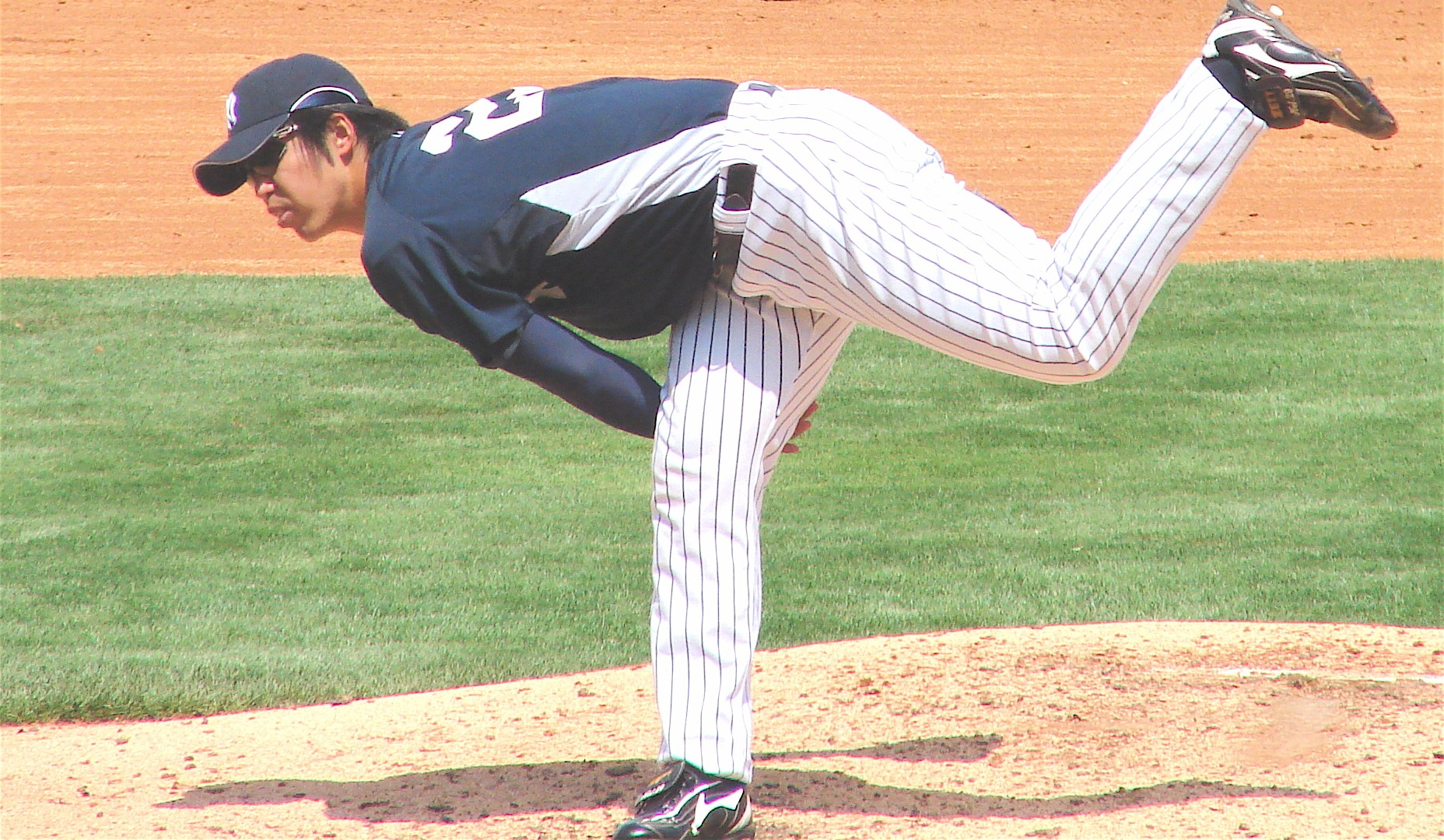
Igawa pitching for the New York Yankees

In 2006, Igawa announced his intention to play in North America. On November 16, 2006, Igawa was posted by the Hanshin Tigers. On November 29, 2006, it was announced that the New York Yankees were the highest bidders at $26,000,194, with the last three digits representing his strikeout total for the 2006 season. Yankees general manager Brian Cashman identified Igawa as a backend starter. He signed a five-year, $20 million contract on December 27, 2006. On January 8, 2007, Igawa was officially announced at a Yankee Stadium press conference. On April 7, 2007, he made his major league debut, allowing seven earned runs in five innings, but received a "no decision" because of Alex Rodriguez's walk-off grand slam. Igawa was soon moved to the bullpen after struggling to find his command. He later earned wins in relief appearances against the Cleveland Indians and Boston Red Sox.

Igawa came to prominence in a game on April 28, in which starting pitcher Jeff Karstens left in the first inning after suffering a broken leg on a liner back to the mound. Igawa came in from the bullpen and pitched six innings of scoreless relief, allowing only two hits and striking out six batters before enjoying a standing ovation on his way to the dugout. He was the winning pitcher in the Yankees' 3–1 victory over their rival Boston Red Sox.

However, the Yankees later saw flaws in his mechanics and, on May 7, optioned him to the Florida State League's Tampa Yankees to work with Nardi Contreras and Billy Connors. Igawa apparently made progress in mechanics and location at Tampa, and was subsequently called up to pitch for the Triple-A Scranton/Wilkes Barre Yankees. Igawa made his return start against the San Francisco Giants on June 22, 2007, allowing two earned runs in 4.2 innings.

On July 27, 2007, Igawa was demoted to Triple-A Scranton/Wilkes-Barre. He was claimed on waivers by the San Diego Padres in August 2007, but the Yankees pulled him back without making a trade. Igawa returned to the Yankees in September 2007 when rosters expanded.

==== 2008–2009 ====
After failing to make the team out of spring training, Igawa started the year with Scranton/Wilkes Barre. He was called up to replace Ian Kennedy. In Igawa's first MLB start of the 2008 season, he gave up eleven hits and six runs in three innings. He was promoted again in June for one appearance before being optioned back to Scranton/Wilkes-Barre the next day. On July 26, 2008, Igawa cleared waivers and was removed from the 40-man roster. He was named to the 2008 Triple-A All-Star Team.

In 2009, Igawa was invited to Spring training as a non-roster invitee, the only Yankee with a guaranteed contract in that position. On March 23, 2009, the Yankees reassigned Igawa to minor league camp. With the Scranton/Wilkes-Barre Yankees, Igawa posted a 10–8 record with a 4.15 ERA, with 105 strikeouts. The 10 wins, 105 strikeouts, and the 4.15 ERA were team bests for the 2009 year. On July 27, 2009, Igawa set a Scranton/Wilkes-Barre franchise record for most career wins, with a 2–1 victory over the Columbus Clippers.

During the 2008 and 2009 seasons, Yankee General manager Brian Cashman twice attempted to sell Igawa to a Japanese team, but Igawa refused to return to Japan both times.

==== 2010–2011 ====
In 2010, Igawa was invited to spring training as a non-roster invitee. However, on March 13, Igawa was once again cut and sent to AAA. In 2011, Igawa played most of the season for the Yankees' AA affiliate, the Trenton Thunder, but did pitch four games in AAA for the Scranton/Wilkes Barre Yankees where he went 1–0 with a 2.78 ERA.

Igawa had stated that he preferred to stay in the United States to play in MLB after his contract with the Yankees expired. He became a free agent after the 2011 season.

=== Orix Buffaloes (2012–2014) ===
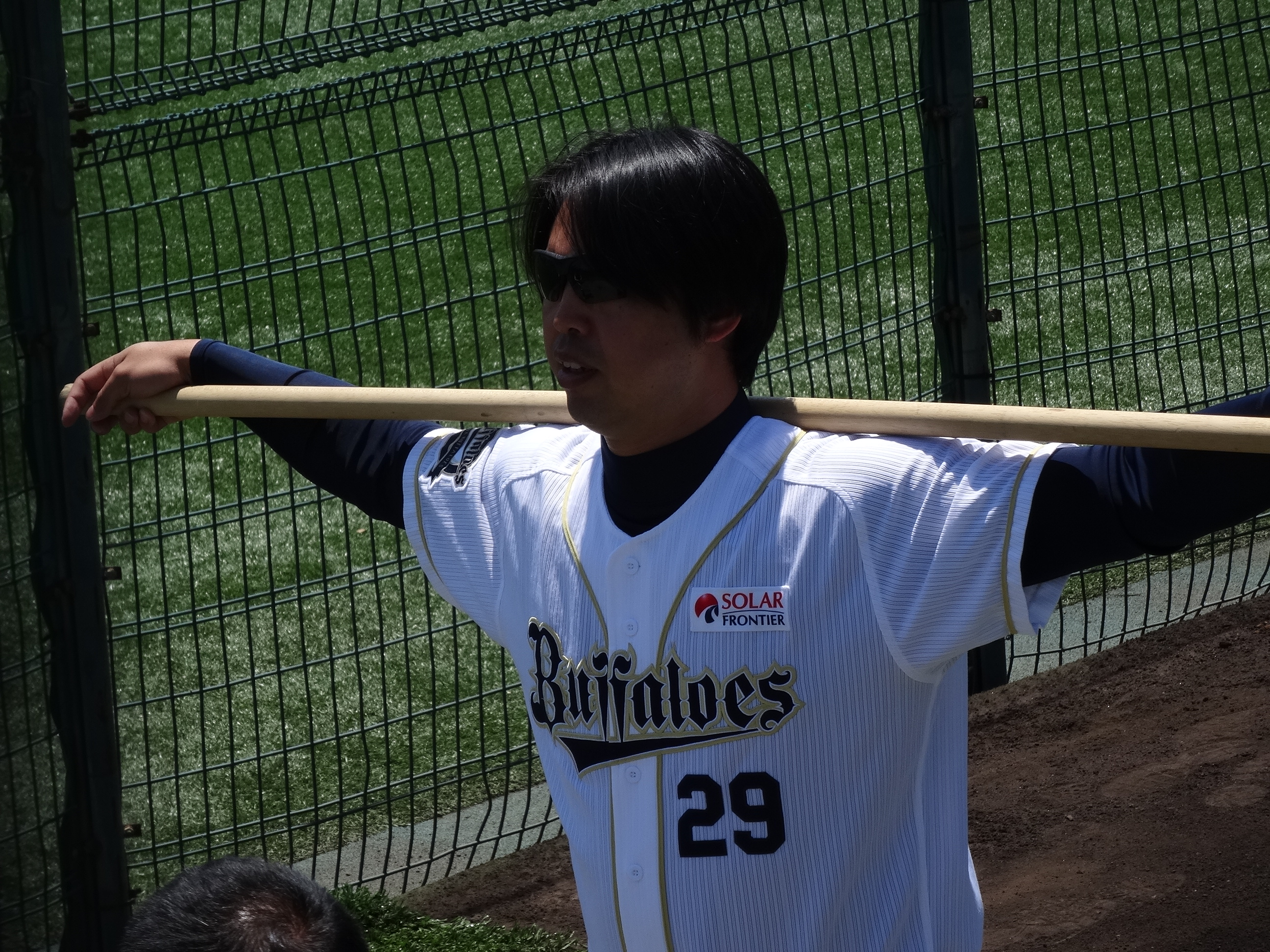
Igawa with the Orix Buffaloes

The Orix Buffaloes of NPB signed Igawa to a two-year contract worth ¥200M prior to the 2012 season. Injuries were a problem for Igawa in his return to Japan; he made only 29 starts from 2012 to 2014. He became a free agent following the 2014 season.

== Pitching style ==
Igawa's fastball was usually in the 87–90 mph range, but he was able to reach back and throw harder when in need of a strikeout (topping out at 93 mph). Igawa also threw a changeup, which hovered in the 78–81 mph range, and a slider, which he used primarily against left-handed batters. His changeup had a tendency to be belt-high and in the middle of the plate. This pitch drew a lot of swings and misses in Japan, but it did not have the same success in America. Igawa was known to possess above-average control in Japan, but had a very poor track record of control at the Major League level.

Igawa was also known for his unique follow-through, in which he threw his left leg into the air and returned his pitching arm to a high position. Since he did not do this with his off-speed pitches as often as he did with his fastballs, it had the potential to make it easier for batters to distinguish whether a pitch was off-speed or not.

His record during day games in Japan was 4–5, 7.09 ERA. Considering the fact that Igawa pitched significantly better in night games, he wore sunglasses during day games to make the game environment closer to that of a night game.

== Personal life ==
In February 2007, Igawa announced on his Japanese blog that he had married recently. His wife and children visit New York for a couple months per year. Igawa enjoys playing shogi. In January 2007, the Japanese Shogi Association appointed Igawa as the "shogi goodwill ambassador" to popularize shogi outside Japan, and presented the diploma of the first grade and the letter of the commission of authority to him. Igawa is a great soccer fan, but he joined the baseball club because there was no soccer club in his junior high school. Originally, he was a fan of the Kashima Antlers, which is based near his hometown of Ibaraki, but he became a Gamba Osaka fan after joining the Hanshin Tigers.

== Awards in Japan ==
- 3-time All-Star (2001–2003)
- 2002 Strikeouts champion of the year
- 2003 Eiji Sawamura Award, Best Nine, Wins and ERA champion of the Central League, Central League MVP
- 2004 Strikeouts champion of the year
- 2006 Strikeouts champion of the Central League
