= Matt DeSalvo =

American baseball player (born 1980)

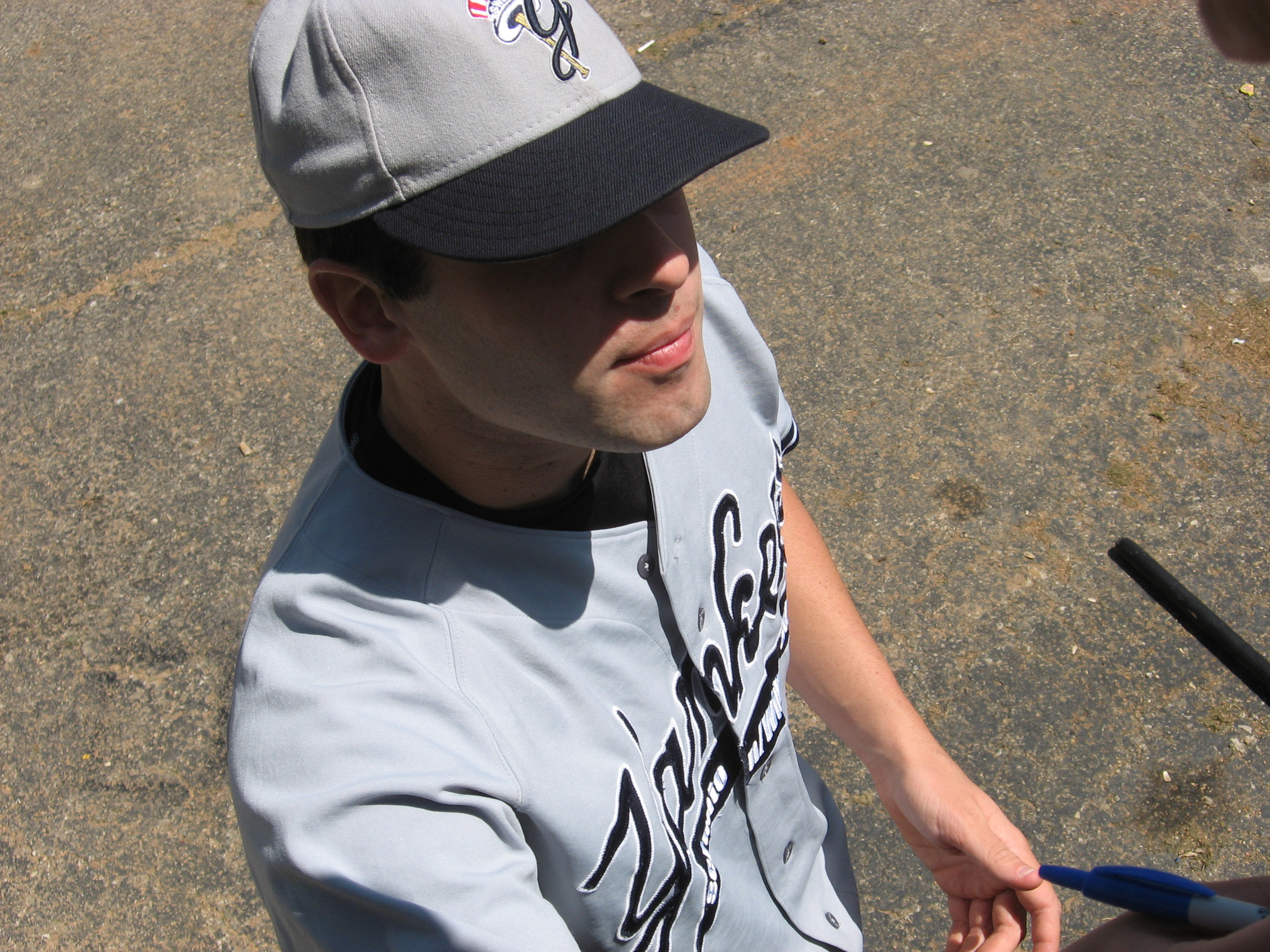
- DeSalvo with the Scranton/Wilkes-Barre Yankees in 2007
- Pitcher
- Born: September 11, 1980 (age 45); New Castle, Pennsylvania, U.S.
- Batted: Right Threw: Right

Professional debut
- MLB: May 7, 2007, for the New York Yankees
- CPBL: March 18, 2012, for the Lamigo Monkeys

Last appearance
- MLB: August 22, 2008, for the Atlanta Braves
- CPBL: September 13, 2012, for the Lamigo Monkeys

MLB statistics
- Win–loss record: 1–3
- Earned run average: 7.89
- Strikeouts: 12

CPBL statistics
- Win–loss record: 11–6
- Earned run average: 2.77
- Strikeouts: 137
- Stats at Baseball Reference

Teams
- New York Yankees (2007); Atlanta Braves (2008); Lamigo Monkeys (2012)

Career highlights and awards
- Taiwan Series champion (2012)

Matthew Thomas DeSalvo (born September 11, 1980) is an American former Major League Baseball pitcher. He made his major league debut with the New York Yankees on May 7, 2007, against the Seattle Mariners going 7 innings and only giving up 3 hits.

== Career ==
DeSalvo graduated from Union Area High School in New Castle, Pennsylvania, in 1998, and Marietta College in Marietta, Ohio, with a bachelor's degree in environmental science, in 2003. He holds the NCAA Division III record for career wins (53), strikeouts in a season (205), and strikeouts in a career (603.) His records for career wins and career strikeouts are NCAA All-Division records. DeSalvo was inducted into the National College Baseball Hall of Fame in July 2016, becoming the first Division III pitcher inducted.

DeSalvo was an All-League player for the Delaware Cows of the Great Lakes League, He also played for the Danbury Westerners of the New England Collegiate Baseball League.

=== New York Yankees ===
DeSalvo was signed as an undrafted free agent by the New York Yankees in 2003. In 2005, he posted a 9–5 record and a 3.02 earned run average (ERA) in 24 starts with the Trenton Thunder. In 2006, his control deserted him, as he averaged 15 and 7.9 walks per 9 innings in, respectively, 78 innings at Trenton and 38 2/3 innings at Triple-A Columbus Clippers. In the minor leagues from 2003 to 2006, he averaged 7 hits, 5 walks, and 8 strikeouts per 9 innings.

Matt DeSalvo played 4 major league games for the New York Yankees, winning one game. Shortly afterward he was sent back to the minors to be replaced by Roger Clemens. DeSalvo made his major league debut for the Yankees on May 7, 2007, against the Seattle Mariners. He pitched 7 innings giving up 3 hits and 1 run, but received a no decision in the Yankees' 3–2 loss. On May 13, 2007, DeSalvo got his first MLB win against the Mariners. He went 6 2/3 innings with 2 strikeouts, while only giving up 7 hits and 2 runs.

On January 26, 2007, DeSalvo was designated for assignment. He cleared waivers, and was sent outright to Triple-A Scranton/Wilkes-Barre on February 1. DeSalvo made his major league debut for the Yankees on May 7, 2007, against the Seattle Mariners. He pitched 7 innings giving up 3 hits and 1 run, but received a no decision in the Yankees' 3–2 loss. On May 13, 2007, DeSalvo got his first MLB win against the Mariners. He went 6 2/3 innings with 2 strikeouts, while only giving up 7 hits and 2 runs.

=== Atlanta Braves ===
On January 5, 2008, he signed a minor league deal with the Atlanta Braves. On August 15, he was called up from the Richmond Braves to replace Tom Glavine on the Braves roster, and was briefly used in the bullpen before being sent back down on August 23. DeSalvo was released on September 4 after refusing an outright assignment to the minors.

=== New York Mets ===
On January 29, 2009, he signed a minor league deal with the New York Mets. He was released by the Mets on April 4.

=== Tampa Bay Rays ===
On May 25, 2009, DeSalvo was signed to a minor league deal by the Tampa Bay Rays. On August 12, 2009, DeSalvo was released by the Tampa Bay Rays.

=== Florida Marlins ===
On August 15, 2009, DeSalvo signed a minor league contract with the Florida Marlins. On May 3, 2010, DeSalvo was released by the Florida Marlins.

=== York Revolution ===
On August 15, 2010, he signed and was activated by the York Revolution of the independent Atlantic League of Professional Baseball. He started that same day against the Lancaster Barnstormers. He pitched 5 innings, striking out 7 and giving up 6 earned runs. He was the winning pitcher thanks to an 18 run outburst by the York team. On February 10, 2011, he signed a contract with the York Revolution. Despite being injured for much of the second half, he finished the season third in the Atlantic League in strikeouts with 108 and fourth in ERA at 3.89. He returned to pitch an inning in the final regular season game. He then pitched in both the divisional series win against Lancaster and the championship series win vs. Long Island. He was on the mound when the final out was recorded.

=== Lamigo Monkeys ===
On December 13, 2011, DeSalvo signed with the Lamigo Monkeys of the Chinese Professional Baseball League.

=== York Revolution (second stint) ===
On August 23, 2014, DeSalvo signed with the York Revolution of the Atlantic League of Professional Baseball. In 1 start he threw 6 innings giving up 4 hits and 4 earned runs (6.00 ERA) with 3 walks and 3 strikeouts suffering the loss. He became a free agent following the season.

On August 7, 2015, DeSalvo re-signed with the Revolution. He was released the following day. In 1 start he threw 5 innings giving up 5 hits 4 earned runs (7.20 ERA) with 3 walks and 6 strikeouts and also getting a win.

=== Steel City Slammin' Sammies ===
In 2020, DeSalvo signed with the Steel City Slammin' Sammies of the Independent Washington League. In 5 starts 27 innings he struggled immensely going 2-0 with a 6.67 ERA with 20 strikeouts.

== Personal life ==
DeSalvo is an avid reader. He has a reading list with over 400 titles, and has read about 200 so far, including Albert Camus' Myth of Sisyphus and Christa Wolf's In Search of Christa. He now lives in Union Township with his wife, Emily DeSalvo
