= Chris Britton (baseball) =

American baseball player (born 1982)

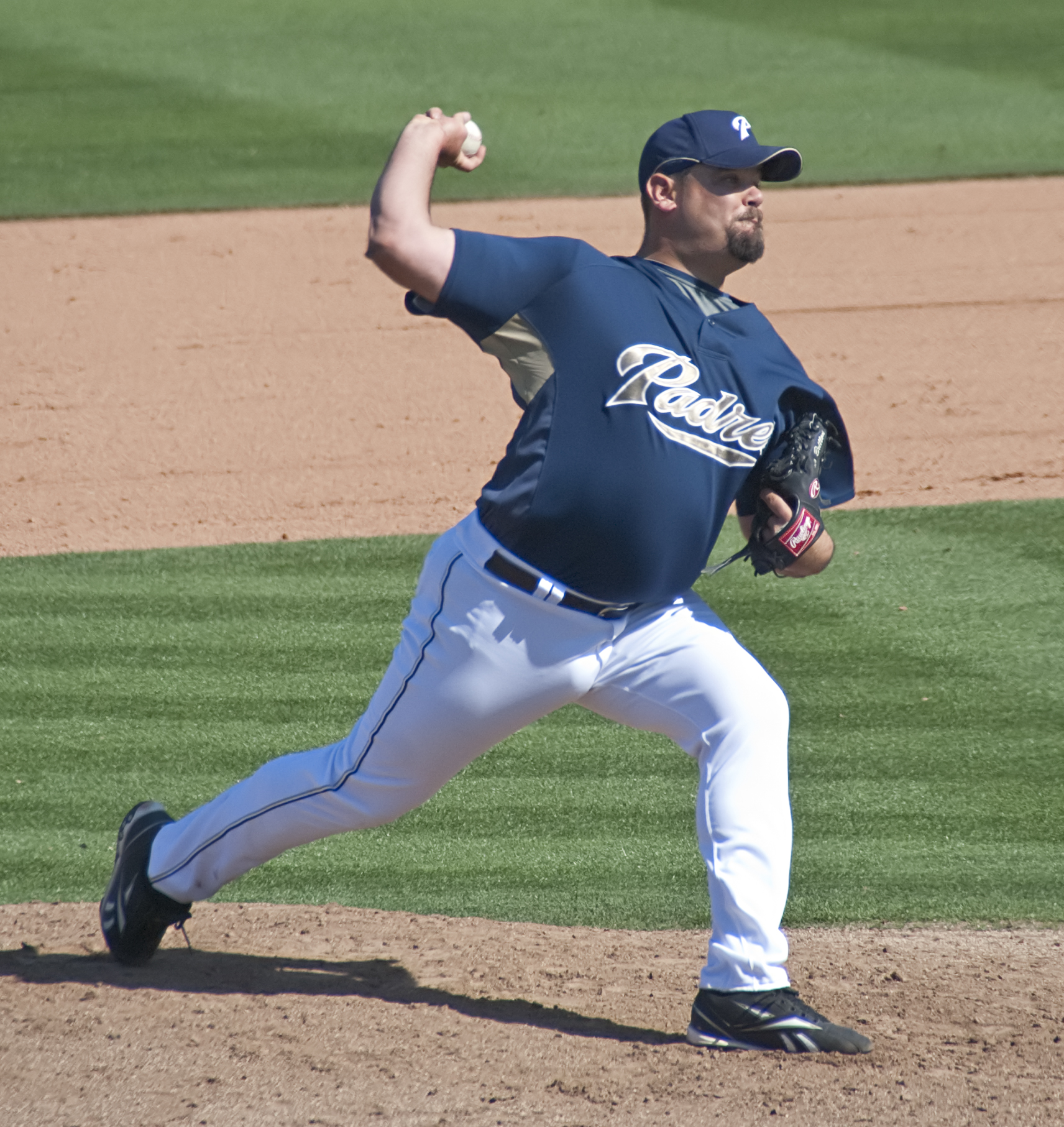
- Britton with the San Diego Padres in 2009 spring training.
- Relief pitcher
- Born: December 16, 1982 (age 43); Hollywood, Florida, U.S.
- Batted: Right Threw: Right

MLB debut
- April 12, 2006, for the Baltimore Orioles

Last MLB appearance
- September 26, 2008, for the New York Yankees

MLB statistics
- Win–loss record: 0–3
- Earned run average: 3.83
- Strikeouts: 58
- Stats at Baseball Reference

Teams
- Baltimore Orioles (2006); New York Yankees (2007–2008)

Christopher Daniel Britton (born December 16, 1982) is an American former right-handed Major League Baseball relief pitcher.

== High school ==
Britton attended Plantation High School in Florida. He was first-team All-Broward County and second team All-State.

== Baseball career ==
=== Baltimore Orioles ===
Britton was drafted by the Baltimore Orioles in the eighth round (233rd overall) of the 2001 MLB draft. He spent time as a starter and reliever but was pitching exclusively out of the bullpen by 2005. That year he was a Mid-Season All-Star with the Frederick Keys of the Carolina League and finished the season with a 1.60 ERA and 110 strikeouts in 78.2 innings. His performance earned him Relief Pitcher of the Year as part of the inaugural This Year in Minor League Baseball Awards.

Britton started the 2006 season in Double-A with the Bowie Baysox but was promoted directly to the major league club on April 12. As a rookie with the Orioles, Britton made 52 relief appearances, and was 0–2 with a 3.35 ERA while allowing 46 hits and recording 41 strikeouts and 17 walks in 53.2 innings pitched.

=== New York Yankees ===
On November 12, 2006, the Orioles traded Britton to the New York Yankees for right-handed pitcher Jaret Wright and $4 million. He started the season at Triple-A Scranton/Wilkes-Barre but was called up on April 15, 2007, after a string of injuries to starting pitching and a pair of extra inning games. He made his first appearance with the Yankees two days later, on April 17, pitching a scoreless ninth inning. Britton was called up again on June 2. He was recalled on August 29, 2007, with Sean Henn getting sent down to Triple-A.

In 2008, Britton was first recalled on May 1. He spent the season bouncing between Triple-A and the majors. On June 6, 2008, Britton was placed on the disabled list with a rib cage injury.

Following the 2008 season, Britton was non-tendered by the Yankees, making him a free agent.

=== San Diego Padres ===
On December 19, 2008, the Padres announced the signing of Britton to a minor league deal. He was released on May 26 after allowing 24 runs on 39 hits in just 20.2 innings between Double-A and Triple-A.

=== Independent baseball ===
Britton signed with the York Revolution of the Independent Atlantic League of Professional Baseball for the 2009 season. He signed with the Lincoln Saltdogs of the American Association for the 2010 season. He was released from the Saltdogs on June 28, 2010.

== Weight ==
At 275 pounds, Britton was one of the heaviest players in baseball. The only other major leaguers who were listed as heavy or heavier at the time were CC Sabathia, Jonathan Broxton, Bobby Jenks, Adam Dunn, and Dmitri Young.
