= Jeff Karstens =

American baseball player (born 1982)

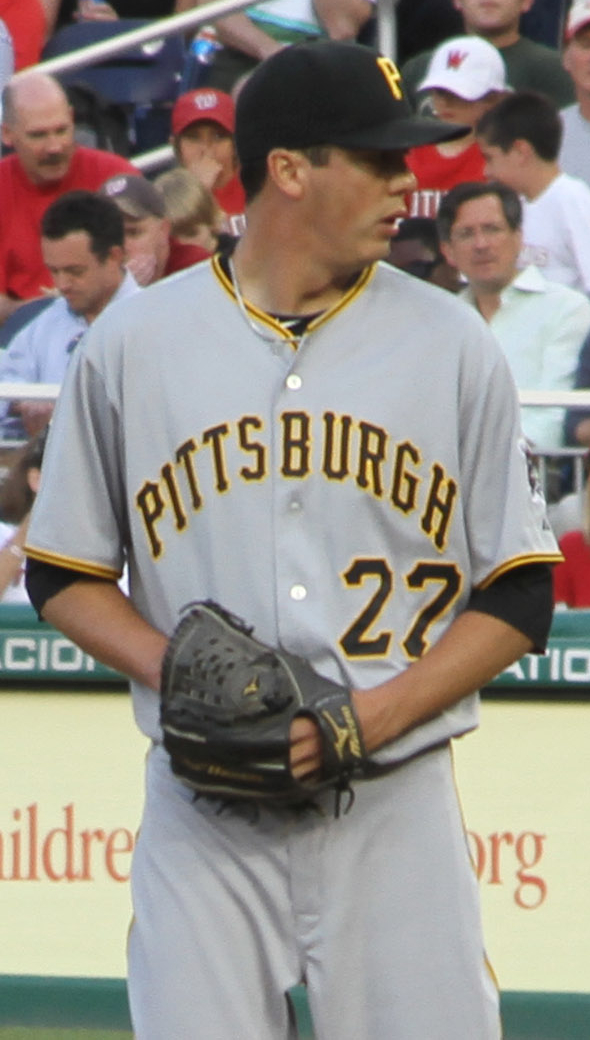
- Karstens with the Pittsburgh Pirates
- Pitcher
- Born: September 24, 1982 (age 44); San Diego, California, U.S.
- Batted: Right Threw: Right

MLB debut
- August 22, 2006, for the New York Yankees

Last MLB appearance
- October 1, 2012, for the Pittsburgh Pirates

MLB statistics
- Win–loss record: 26–40
- Earned run average: 4.44
- Strikeouts: 330
- Stats at Baseball Reference

Teams
- New York Yankees (2006–2007); Pittsburgh Pirates (2008–2012)

Jeff Karstens
Medal record

Men's baseball

Representing United States

Baseball World Cup
Gold medal – first place	2007 Tianmu	National team

Jeffrey Wayne Karstens (born September 24, 1982) is an American former right-handed starting pitcher in Major League Baseball (MLB). Karstens pitched for the New York Yankees in 2006 and 2007 and the Pittsburgh Pirates from 2008 to 2012.

== High school and college ==
Karstens attended Mount Miguel High School in Spring Valley, California and initially played as a catcher. In his senior season, he was the team's Most Valuable Player, a First-Team All-Conference Honors selection, and a Second-Team All-San Diego selection. He posted an 8–2 record with a 2.99 ERA. After high school, Karstens attended Grossmont College and Texas Tech University in Lubbock, Texas, where he played for the Red Raiders.

== Professional career ==
=== New York Yankees ===
Karstens was drafted in the 19th round of the 2003 Major League Baseball draft by the New York Yankees. He played the 2005 season with the Yankees' Double-A affiliate, the Trenton Thunder, posting a 12–11 record with a 4.15 ERA and 147 strikeouts. He led his team in wins with 12 (3rd most in the league), in Games started with 27 (2nd in the league), and in innings pitched with 169 (4th in the league).

Karstens started the 2006 season with the Yankees Triple-A affiliate, the Columbus Clippers. He struggled, posting an 0–5 record with a 9.85 ERA. This resulted in his demotion to Double-A Trenton. At Trenton, he went 6–0 with a 2.31 ERA. His success was rewarded with a trip back to Columbus, where he compiled a 5–0 record with a 1.85 ERA. He was named the International League Player of the Week for the week of July 30. Karstens was called up from Triple-A Columbus on August 19, 2006. Three days later, he made his Major League debut for the Yankees on August 22, against the Seattle Mariners. He went 5 2/3 innings, allowing three earned runs on six hits and two walks for a no-decision in a 6–5 loss. He struck out two and gave up two home runs. On August 27, 2006, he went 6.0 innings giving up 6 hits and 3 earned runs in an 11–8 win against the Los Angeles Angels of Anaheim. In that outing, Karstens walked 2, struck out 1, and earned his first career Major League victory.

In spring training prior to the 2007 season, Karstens pitched well enough to make a case for the rotation. Karstens was shut down due to elbow tendinitis and placed on the 15-day disabled list to start the season, allowing Darrell Rasner to take his spot in the rotation to start the season. After injuries to Yankees starters Mike Mussina and Carl Pavano, he was activated to join the Yankee 40-man roster. On April 28, 2007, in a game against the Boston Red Sox, Karstens was struck in the leg by a line drive off the bat of Boston shortstop Julio Lugo, the first batter of the game. He faced only one more batter before being taken out. It was later reported that Karstens fractured his fibula and was placed on the 15-day disabled list. He was later moved to the 60-day disabled list, and then activated on August 1.

On August 14, 2007, Karstens gave up 5 earned runs in only 3 innings, raising his season ERA to 11.20. The next day, he was optioned back to the Minor Leagues. He was reactivated on September 9. Following the end of the season, Karstens pitched for Team USA in the 2007 Baseball World Cup. He went 2-0 with a 0.69 ERA on the way to win Gold.

Karstens began the 2008 season on the 15-day disabled list, but was later activated and immediately optioned to the minors. He was named the International League Player of the Week for the week of June 23.

=== Pittsburgh Pirates ===
On July 26, 2008, Karstens was acquired by the Pirates with José Tábata, Ross Ohlendorf, and Daniel McCutchen from the New York Yankees for outfielder Xavier Nady and pitcher Dámaso Marte. On August 1, 2008, Jeff made his Pirates debut, defeating the Chicago Cubs. In Karsten's next start on August 6, he took a perfect game against the Arizona Diamondbacks through 7.2 innings before surrendering a double to Chris Young in the 8th inning. Karstens, and the Pirates, won 2–0 over Randy Johnson; Karstens gave up two hits and a walk.

In 2009, Karstens was fined an undisclosed amount by Major League Baseball for hitting Milwaukee's Ryan Braun squarely between his shoulder blades with a pitch in April. The Brewers took exception to this and later in the season Karstens was hit by a pitch in the left shoulder by a Milwaukee pitcher. Both benches then cleared. He finished his 2009 campaign of 39 games (13 of which he started) with a 4–6 record, a 5.42 ERA, gave up 12 home runs, hit 2 batsmen, walked 45, struck out 52, had a .279 average against, 1.48 walks and hits per inning pitched, in just 108 innings pitched. Karstens was designated for assignment following the 2009 season. On November 30, 2009, Karstens cleared waivers and was outrighted to the Triple-A Indianapolis Indians.

In 2010, Karstens attended Pirates spring training as a non-roster invitee. He pitched relief in 8 games for a 6.23 ERA and was reassigned to the minor league camp. He began the season in the Triple-A Indianapolis bullpen, but problems with starting Pirates starting pitching prompted a call-up on April 27. Karstens was the pitching matchup in the highly anticipated debut of young phenom Stephen Strasburg. He gave up 9 hits for 4 runs (4 earned) in 5 innings for his second loss of the season.

On July 18, 2011, Karstens was named as the National League Player of the Week for the period of July 11–17, 2011. Karstens pitched a complete-game shutout on July 15 in a 4–0 win over the Houston Astros and became the first Pirates starter to win five consecutive decisions since Ian Snell in June 2006.

Karstens had the best season of his career in 2011. Appearing in 30 games (26 starts), in which he went 9–9 with an ERA of 3.38, giving up 22 home runs, hitting 4 batsmen, walking 33, striking out 96, and having a WHIP of 1.207 through 162.1 innings.

On November 30, 2012, Karstens was designated for assignment and then was not tendered a contract, making him a free agent.

On January 15, 2013, the Pirates resigned Karstens to a 1-year deal. Karstens underwent surgery on his rotator cuff and labrum in his throwing shoulder on June 7, 2013, and was shut down for the rest of the 2013 season.

On May 4, 2015, Karstens announced via Twitter and Instagram his retirement from baseball. Since 2016, he has served as the pitching coach for Berkeley Preparatory School in Tampa, Florida.
