= Scott Proctor =

American baseball player (born 1977)

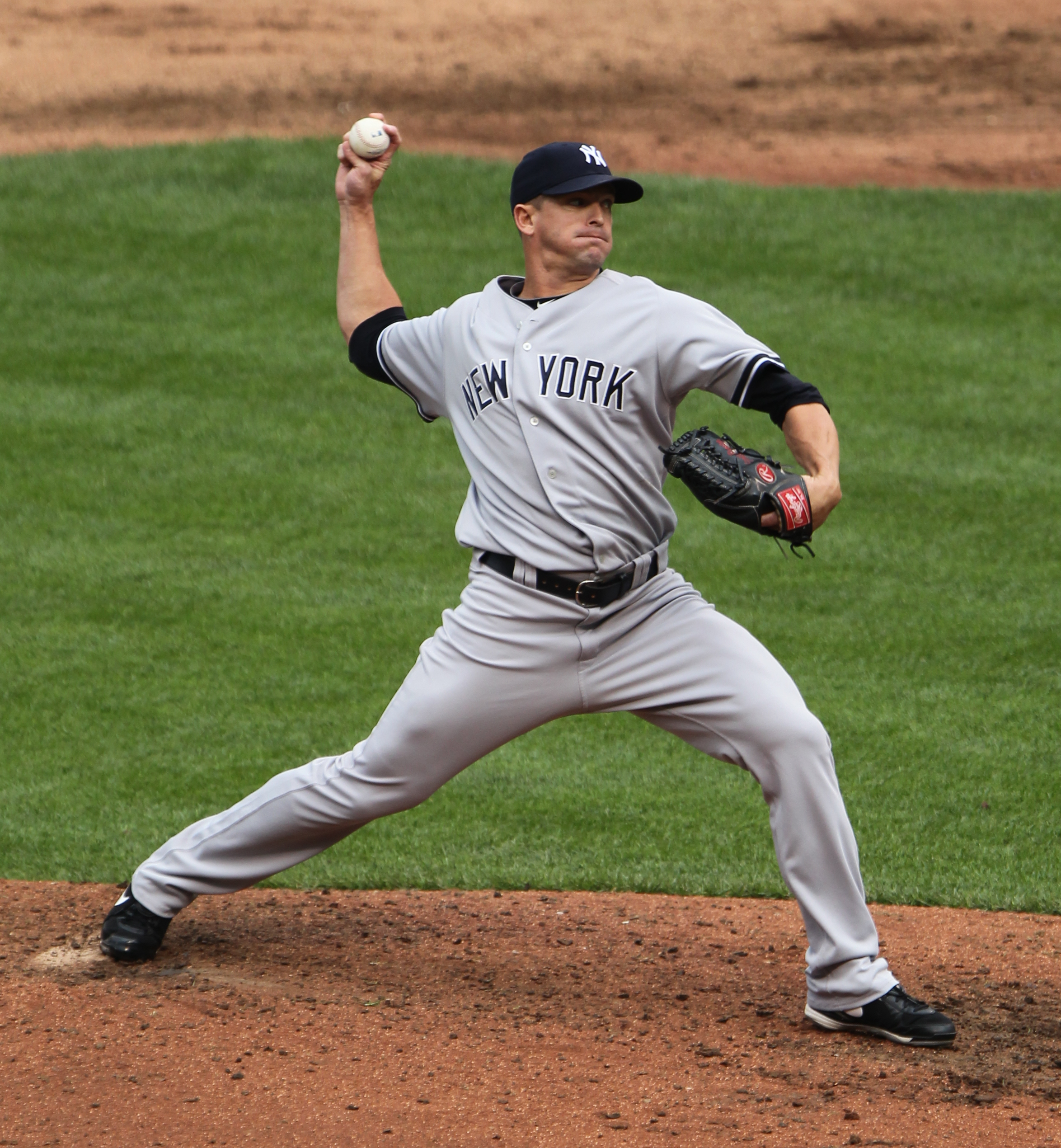
- Proctor pitching for the New York Yankees in 2011
- Pitcher
- Born: January 2, 1977 (age 49); Stuart, Florida, U.S.
- Batted: Right Threw: Right

Professional debut
- MLB: April 20, 2004, for the New York Yankees
- KBO: April 8, 2012, for the Doosan Bears

Last appearance
- MLB: September 28, 2011, for the New York Yankees
- KBO: October 5, 2012, for the Doosan Bears

MLB statistics
- Win–loss record: 18–16
- Earned run average: 4.78
- Strikeouts: 291

KBO statistics
- Win–loss record: 4–4
- Earned run average: 1.79
- Strikeouts: 46
- Stats at Baseball Reference

Teams
- New York Yankees (2004–2007); Los Angeles Dodgers (2007–2008); Atlanta Braves (2010–2011); New York Yankees (2011); Doosan Bears (2012)

Scott Christopher Proctor (born January 2, 1977) is an American former professional baseball pitcher. He played in Major League Baseball (MLB) between 2004 and 2011 for the New York Yankees, Los Angeles Dodgers, and Atlanta Braves. In 2012, he played for the Doosan Bears of the KBO League.

== Baseball career ==
=== Amateur career ===
Proctor was drafted in the 17th round of the 1995 Major League Baseball draft by the New York Mets out of Martin County High School, but decided to attend Florida State University, where he played for the Florida State Seminoles baseball team under head coach Mike Martin. He was 10–2 in 60 career games for Florida State. In 1996, he played collegiate summer baseball for the Orleans Cardinals of the Cape Cod Baseball League, returned to the league in 1997 and 1998 to play with the Hyannis Mets, and was named a league all-star in 1997.

=== Minor leagues ===
In 1998, Proctor was drafted in the fifth round by the Los Angeles Dodgers and assigned to the Yakima Bears to start his professional career. He played for the Vero Beach Dodgers (2000–2001), Jacksonville Suns (2001–2003) and Las Vegas 51s (2003).

=== New York Yankees ===
On July 31, 2003, Proctor was traded to the New York Yankees with Bubba Crosby for Robin Ventura. The Yankees assigned him to the Triple-A Columbus Clippers. Proctor made his Major League Baseball debut for the Yankees on April 20, 2004, against the Chicago White Sox, working 2 1/3 innings in relief and allowing 2 earned runs.

Throughout the course of his first season, he appeared in 26 games, pitched 25 innings, finished 12 games, and posted a 2–1 record and a 5.40 ERA with 21 strikeouts. He finished the 2005 season with a 6.04 ERA and a 1–0 record.

In 2006, Proctor emerged as a durable, reliable late-inning option for manager Joe Torre. Finally harnessing his breaking pitches, Proctor led the American League with 83 appearances, often pitching more than one inning or in consecutive games. Proctor notched his first career save in 2006. Along with Kyle Farnsworth and Brian Bruney, Proctor was a part of the Yankees' bridge between the starters and closer Mariano Rivera, and reprised that role for the first part of the 2007 season. Proctor pitched in five games in the 2006 MLB postseason for the Yankees: two against Los Angeles and three against Detroit. In six innings, he struck out two and gave up just one run.

In May 2007, Yankees first baseman Josh Phelps had slid hard into Seattle catcher Kenji Johjima. In return, Phelps was hit by Jarrod Washburn on the first pitch of his next at-bat. Both benches were warned. Proctor then threw inside to Yuniesky Betancourt and was ejected, along with Yankees manager Joe Torre. Proctor was fined and suspended for four games, while Torre was suspended for one. On June 1, 2007, Proctor hit Boston Red Sox first baseman Kevin Youkilis in the shoulder after two Yankee batters were hit. Youkilis was the fifth hit batsman in the game. A visibly enraged Youkilis had to be held back by Yankee catcher Jorge Posada. Proctor was soon ejected after both benches calmed, though Proctor remained upset over his ejection. After the game, he protested to the media that the pitch had gotten away from him and that he had no reason to hit Youkilis as he had a 2–2 count. Before the following game, during the YES Pre-Game Show, Joe Torre told reporters that after Proctor's ejection, Proctor stormed into Torre's office and insisted that he did not throw at Youkilis intentionally, an explanation Torre accepted. Proctor was ultimately not suspended.

On June 30, after a poor performance in a loss to the Oakland Athletics (and after taking the loss in each of the Yankees' last two games), Proctor lit fire to his equipment on the field, just feet from the Yankees dugout.

Proctor's heavy use as a Yankee reliever led to concerns that Torre was overusing him. Proctor appeared in 83 games in both 2006 and 2007, 3rd and 5th most amongst all MLB pitchers respectively. General manager Brian Cashman revealed in 2011 that he confronted Torre about Proctor's workload and asked the pitcher to be more honest about whether he could pitch on a given day: "I met with Proctor and said, 'You better stop telling the manager [that you can pitch] because the way he manages' — I'm not criticizing Joe, that's just the way he is — 'He wants an honest answer. Just tell him no.'"

=== Los Angeles Dodgers ===
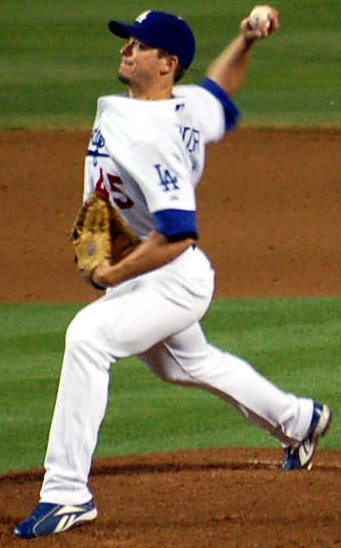
Proctor with the Los Angeles Dodgers in 2007

On July 31, 2007, Proctor was traded to the Los Angeles Dodgers in exchange for infielder Wilson Betemit. He was mostly used as a late inning setup man. He finished the 2007 season with an impressive 3–0 record and a 3.38 ERA in 31 relief appearances for the Dodgers.

Proctor struggled in 2008 and spent most of the season on the disabled list. However, he pitched much better in the month of September, helping the Los Angeles Dodgers win the National League West Division title. He finished the season with a 2–0 record, but a high ERA of 6.05 in just 41 games. He became a free agent at the end of the season.

=== Florida Marlins ===
In January 2009, Proctor signed a one-year contract with the Florida Marlins worth $750,000, with an additional $250,000 in incentives. During Spring training, he was placed on the disabled list with elbow pain. When the pain remained, and ligament fraying was found, he underwent Tommy John surgery on May 12, 2009, and missed the entire 2009 season. On October 9, 2009, Proctor was released by the Marlins.

=== Atlanta Braves ===
On November 4, 2009, Proctor's agent, Mark Rodgers, released that Proctor had signed a split contract with the Braves and received an invitation to Spring training. He spent 2010 pitching for the Double-A Mississippi Braves and Triple-A Gwinnett Braves. As of August 14, he had compiled a 7.82 ERA in 31 appearances between the 2 teams.

On March 27, 2011, after pitching with a 5.06 ERA in ten appearances in the 2011 Atlanta Braves Spring training camp, Proctor was released from the Braves' organization. Had he remained on the Braves' roster the following day, his $750,000 salary would have been paid in full. Instead, the Braves had to pay him a fraction of his salary.

Just over a week after being released from the Braves organization, Proctor re-signed to the Braves on April 3, 2011, with a minor league contract. He has been added to the roster of their Triple-A affiliate, the Gwinnett Braves. He had his contract purchased on May 14. Proctor was released from the Braves on August 10, 2011, after posting a 6.44 ERA in 31 appearances. His roster spot was filled by Arodys Vizcaíno. In two seasons with Atlanta, Proctor, with a record of 2–3, had a 6.43 ERA in 37 appearances, allowing 35 hits, 5 Home runs, 25 earned runs and 23 walks with 24 strikeouts in 35 innings.

=== Return to the Yankees ===
On August 13, he signed a minor league contract with the New York Yankees and was assigned to the Triple-A Scranton/Wilkes-Barre Yankees. He was called up on September 1 and made his debut for the Yankees on September 5, entering in relief against the Baltimore Orioles. Proctor picked up the loss in Game 162, surrendering a walkoff homerun to Evan Longoria that propelled the Rays to the postseason. He declared for free agency on October 11.

=== Doosan Bears ===
Proctor signed with the Doosan Bears of the Korea Baseball Organization for the 2012 season.

=== San Francisco Giants ===
Proctor signed a minor league contract with the San Francisco Giants on January 2, 2013.

=== Baltimore Orioles ===
Proctor was traded to the Orioles on March 29, 2013, for cash considerations. He announced his retirement in May.

== Personal life ==
In June 2009, Proctor revealed that he was a recovering alcoholic and had been attending Alcoholics Anonymous meetings. He credits Mariano Rivera with urging him to straighten his life out. Proctor attributed his struggles later in his career to his alcoholism, not his potential overusage.
