= Sean Henn =

American baseball player (born 1981)

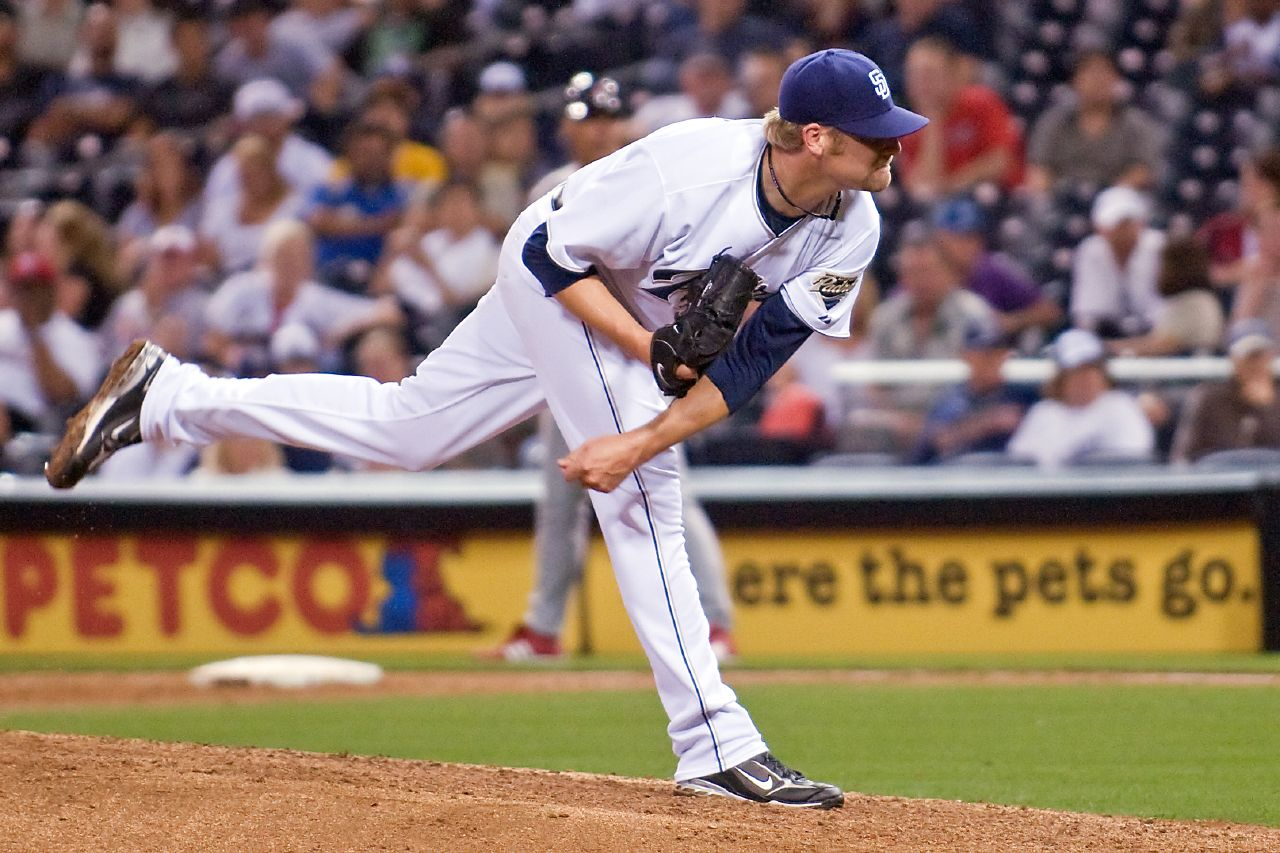
- Henn with the San Diego Padres
- Pitcher
- Born: April 23, 1981 (age 45); Fort Worth, Texas, U.S.
- Batted: Right Threw: Left

Professional debut
- MLB: May 4, 2005, for the New York Yankees
- KBO: June 10, 2012, for the Hanwha Eagles

Last appearance
- MLB: September 23, 2013, for the New York Mets
- KBO: July 19, 2012, for the Hanwha Eagles

MLB statistics
- Win–loss record: 2–10
- Earned run average: 7.42
- Strikeouts: 63

KBO statistics
- Win–loss record: 0–2
- Earned run average: 8.40
- Strikeouts: 19
- Stats at Baseball Reference

Teams
- New York Yankees (2005–2007); San Diego Padres (2008); Minnesota Twins (2009); Baltimore Orioles (2009); Hanwha Eagles (2012); New York Mets (2013)

Sean Michael Henn (born April 23, 1981) is an American former professional baseball pitcher. Henn attended McLennan Community College in Texas, and was drafted in the 26th round in 2000 by the New York Yankees. He played in Major League Baseball (MLB) for the Yankees, San Diego Padres, Minnesota Twins, Baltimore Orioles, and New York Mets. He also played in the KBO League for the Hanwha Eagles.

== Baseball career ==
=== New York Yankees ===
Starting the 2005 season in the minor leagues with the Yankees' Double-A affiliate, the Trenton Thunder, Henn was called up to the Yankees' Triple-A affiliate, the Columbus Clippers. On May 4, he started in the majors in place of Randy Johnson against the Tampa Bay Devil Rays. He was roughed up, allowing 6 runs (5 earned) in 2.1 innings with 2 walks and no strikeouts. Henn was sent down to the minors, but he was called up to replace an injured Kevin Brown. In his second major league career outing, Henn gave up 5 runs, 4 earned over 4.2 innings, including 7 walks and only 46 strikes over 98 pitches, earning him a second loss. In his third major league outing, which came against the New York Mets, Henn allowed six run on seven hits in four innings. Since the Yankees' schedule allowed them to play without a fifth starter, the Yankees sent him back to the Clippers. The roster opening left by Henn's demotion allowed the Yankees to call up Kevin Reese.

In 2006, he was 0-1 in 4 games. In 2007, he beat out Ron Villone in spring training for the final bullpen spot. He threw 4 scoreless innings to begin the regular season but was optioned by May. In June, Yankees manager Joe Torre considered him the team's long reliever. Henn was called up on July 22, 2007, to pitch against the Tampa Bay Devil Rays. Henn's strikeout in that game would be the last plate appearance by a Yankee pitcher at Yankee Stadium. He was charged with the loss in two pivotal, extra inning games with direct playoff implications against the Angels and Tigers in late August 2007.

In 2008, Henn started the season on the 15-day DL. While on a rehab assignment with Scranton, the Yankees designated him for assignment to make room on the 40-man roster.

=== San Diego Padres ===
On May 9, Henn was claimed off waivers by the San Diego Padres. On June 2, he was sent outright to Triple-A.

=== Minnesota Twins ===
In December 2008, he signed a minor league contract with the Minnesota Twins. The Twins called him up on May 19 to fill the roster position left open by Glen Perkins being placed on the disabled list. He was outrighted back to the minor leagues on July 2.

=== Baltimore Orioles ===
On September 8, 2009, Henn was traded to the Baltimore Orioles for a player to be named later or cash considerations.

=== Toronto Blue Jays ===
On October 29, 2009, Henn was claimed off waivers by the Toronto Blue Jays. He spent the 2010 season in the minors with the Las Vegas 51s and then re-signed with the Blue Jays after the season.

=== Seattle Mariners ===
Henn signed a minor league contract with the Seattle Mariners in November 2011. He also received an invitation to spring training.

=== Hanwha Eagles ===
On June 1, 2012, Henn signed with the Hanwha Eagles of the KBO League for the remainder of the 2012 season.

=== New York Mets ===
On April 12, 2013, Henn signed a minor league contract with the New York Mets organization. He began the year with the Triple-A Las Vegas 51s. Henn was called-up the Mets on September 7, after Scott Rice was placed on the disabled list. He was outrighted off the roster on October 17.
