= 2007 Los Angeles Angels season =

Major League Baseball season

2007 Los Angeles Angels
- American League West champions
- League: American League
- Division: West
- Ballpark: Angel Stadium
- City: Anaheim, California
- Record: 94–68 (.580)
- Divisional place: 1st
- Owner: Arte Moreno
- General manager: Bill Stoneman
- Manager: Mike Scioscia
- Television: FSN West; KCOP (My 13); Steve Physioc, Rex Hudler, Mark Gubicza
- Radio: KSPN (AM 710); Terry Smith, Rory Markas; KLAA (AM 830—Spanish)
- Stats: ESPN.com; Baseball Reference

The 2007 Los Angeles Angels season was the franchise's 47th season since inception. The regular season ended with a record of 94–68 and the Angels winning the American League West title for the sixth time. However, the Angels' playoff run quickly ended, as they were swept by the Boston Red Sox in the American League Division Series, just as they were in 2004.

== Offseason ==
During the offseason, the Angels of Anaheim released Adam Kennedy and Darin Erstad, two of the few players remaining from their 2002 World Series championship team, forcing the Angels to rely on their rookies and younger veterans for the early part of the season. In November, they signed former Texas Rangers center fielder Gary Matthews, Jr. to a 5-year contract worth $50 million. Outfielder Juan Rivera broke a leg playing winter baseball in the Venezuelan winter league, leading the Angels of Anaheim to sign free agent Shea Hillenbrand. The Angels of Anaheim solidified their bullpen for the 2007 season by re-signing set-up man Scot Shields and closer Francisco Rodríguez each to one-year contracts and acquiring Justin Speier and Darren Oliver via free agency.

Late in spring training, third baseman Chone Figgins fractured his finger, putting him out of action for the first month of the season. This unexpected injury led Maicer Izturis to claim the start at third base entering the season.

== Regular season ==
=== Season summary ===
==== April ====
The Angels' season began with a three-game sweep of the Rangers at home, a series which saw the Angels of Anaheim outscore the Rangers 17–7. The Angels of Anaheim continued their 7-game homestand with a four-game series split with the Athletics. With a solid record of 5–2 and first place in the division after the first week of the season, the Angels of Anaheim traveled onto the road to take on the Indians. However, the Indians' previous four-game series with the Mariners was postponed because of heavy snow in Cleveland, Ohio.

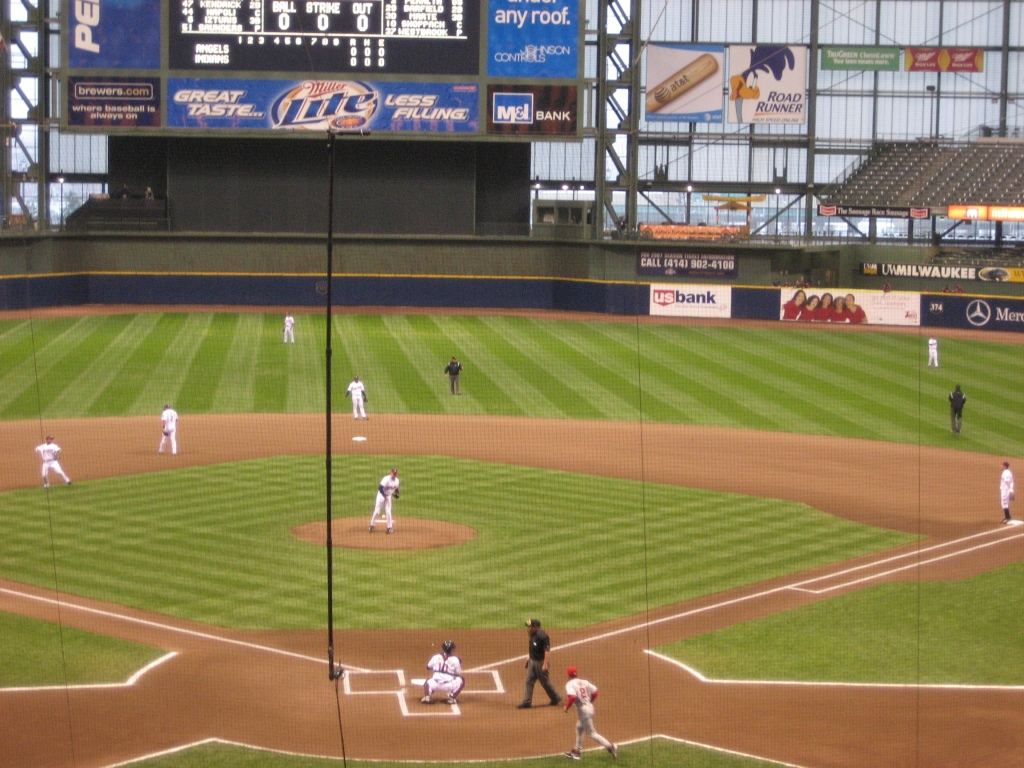
The Angels of Anaheim and Indians at Miller Park in Milwaukee, Wisconsin

The large amount of snow that had fallen upon Jacobs Field brought about the discussion of moving the series to a city with better field conditions. After a discussion about possibly moving the series to Anaheim, the Indians decided to move the three-game series to the roofed Miller Park in Milwaukee, Wisconsin, home of the Milwaukee Brewers.

The Indians took the three-game series 2 games to 1. The Angels of Anaheim continued their road trip by being swept by the Red Sox in a three-game series and the Athletics in a two-game series, dropping the Angels to a 6–9 record. During the game against the Athletics on April 18, second baseman Howie Kendrick was hit by a pitch, and placed on the 15-day disabled list. Kendrick would eventually return to the team in mid-May.

The Angels of Anaheim returned home and swept the Mariners in a three-game series, split a two-game series with the Detroit Tigers, and swept the Devil Rays in a two-game series that saw the Angels of Anaheim outscore the Devil Rays 20–4. After losing the first game on a new roadtrip to the White Sox, the Angels of Anaheim won their final three games of the month, including one to the Royals.

==== May ====
May began with the Angels of Anaheim extending their winning streak to four games with a victory over the Royals. However, the Royals salvaged a series split by winning the last two games of the four-game series. The Angels of Anaheim returned home to greet the White Sox, but the White Sox were rewarded with a series win, winning two of three games. The Angels of Anaheim dropped their third game in a row when they lost the series opener to the Indians. But good pitching and good defense guided the Angels of Anaheim to winning the final two games of the series by a combined score of 11–2, including an 8–0 victory behind Kelvim Escobar's shutout.

The Angels of Anaheim went to Texas to take three of four games against the Rangers. Then, they went into Seattle to take on the Mariners. The Mariners' offense lit up Kelvim Escobar and the Angels lost 11–3. But the Angels of Anaheim took the final two games of their series against the Mariners.

The Angels returned to Anaheim to begin a Freeway Series with the Dodgers. The three-game series saw the Angels of Anaheim sweep their crosstown rivals, outscoring the Dodgers 19–4. The series also set an Angels of Anaheim record in attendance. The three-game series averaged 44,341 fans, an Angel Stadium record for highest average attendance for a three-game series since the stadium was renovated in 1998. The Angels' short homestand ended and the Angels of Anaheim headed out on the road again to begin a three-game series with the defending World Series runners-up, the Tigers.

The Angels of Anaheim won the series opener to extend their winning streak to a season-high six games, in which they outscored their opponents 37–10. However, the Tigers won the final two games, and the series. The Angels of Anaheim then went to New York to begin a three-game series with the Yankees. The Angels, entering the season as the only American League team with a winning record against the Yankees in the Joe Torre-era at 55–52, added to their win total with a three-game series sweep, in which the Yankees were outscored 17–10. The Angels of Anaheim ended the month by taking two of three against the Mariners and losing the first game of a four-game series with the Orioles. The final game of the month, a 4–3 come-from-behind victory, saw Angels' John Lackey become the first Major League pitcher to win his 8th game of the season.

==== June ====
The Angels continued their trend of winning the first game of the month when they beat the Orioles with a 3–2 comeback win. John Lackey became the first Major League pitcher in 2007 to win his 9th game of the season. The Angels won the remaining two games of the series and began a three-game series with the Twins with an offensive explosion, scoring season-highs in runs (16), hits (23), runs in an inning (8 in the 8th), and home runs (4), as the Angels beat the Twins 16–3. The Angels split the final two games of the series before leaving to finish interleague play.

The Angels went on the road to face the 2006 World Series champion Cardinals. After falling behind 4–0 early in the game, the Angels offense exploded for 10 runs in a 10–6 victory. The Angels split the remaining two games of the series and continued their roadtrip against the Reds. Kelvim Escobar striking out a career-high 14 batters in the series opener, but the Angels lost, 5–3. The loss gave the Angels their first two-game losing streak since May 23–24. John Lackey became the first Major League pitcher to win his 10th game of the season and Francisco Rodríguez became the first closer in the American League to earn his 20th save of the season in the second game of the series, which the Angels won 6–3. In the final game of the series, the Angels scored 6 runs in the 7th inning to fuel the offense to a 9–7 victory.

The Angels came back home, but went to Dodger Stadium to complete their Freeway Series with the Dodgers. Ervin Santana pitched 7 strong innings, allowing only two runs; however, Santana was outdueled by Dodgers' pitcher Derek Lowe, who struck out a career-high 11 batters in 7 innings. The Dodgers took game one of the three-game series 2–1. Jered Weaver won his 5th consecutive decision in a costly effort; Weaver jammed his shoulder sliding into 2nd base, Garret Anderson injured his right hip and was placed on the 15-day disabled list after the game, and Casey Kotchman suffered a concussion when a pickoff throw hit him in the helmet. Weaver's sixth win of the season gave the Angels' starters 38 wins on the season, which led the league. Kelvim Escobar struck out 8 batters and only gave up three runs in seven innings. Gary Matthews, Jr. hit his first career inside-the-park home run and the Angels won the final game 10–4. The paid attendance for all three games of the series was 56,000, the overall capacity of Dodger Stadium. This marked the first time in Dodger Stadium history that this mark was set.

The Angels returned home to begin an interleague series with the Houston Astros. Chone Figgins had a career night in the series opener. Figgins went 6-for-6, becoming the second player in team history to go 6-for-6; outfielder Garret Anderson accomplished this feat in 1996. Figgins also became the first player in Major League history to go 6-for-6 with a walk-off hit in a 9-inning game. The Angels trailed 9–4 going into the bottom of the 7th inning, where they scored 5 runs, capped off by Figgins' 5th hit of the night, an infield single. In the 9th inning, Figgins drove in Reggie Willits with an RBI triple to win the game 10–9. The Astros continued their incredible offense and took the second game. Recent call-up Terry Evans hit his first Major League home run in his first home at-bat, but the Angels trailed until the 7th inning. Astros pitching walked 4 consecutive Angels batters, tying up the score, before Vladimir Guerrero hit a three-run home run. Guerrero's home run was the Angels' only hit in a 6-run 7th inning. The Angels held on to win the series' finale 8–4. The Angels' 6-run inning marked the third time in a span of one week that the Angels had scored 5 or more runs in the 7th inning.

The Angels trailed 4–0 late in their series opener against the Pirates, but came from behind once again to win 5–4 in 11 innings. In the second game, the Angels took an early lead and took the game 10–1. The Angels blew a late-inning lead when Xavier Nady hit an RBI-single off Francisco Rodríguez to tie the game 3–3. However, in the 10th inning Erick Aybar hit the Angels second walk-off ground-rule double in the series to win the game 4–3. The three-game series sweep was the Angels' first since they swept the Yankees in May. The Angels also won their 9th series in a row.

The Angels were prepared to play their first games against an American League team in three weeks, but were swept by the Royals, marking the first time in two months that the Angels were swept and the first series the Angels lost since May 4–6. The Angels traveled to Baltimore, Maryland to begin a three-game series with the Orioles. In the series opener, the Angels blew a 5-run lead, an Oriole rally highlighted by Aubrey Huff hitting for the cycle. But Howie Kendrick hit a two-run home run in the 9th inning and the Angels won 9–7. Baltimore took the second game, 6–3, and the Angels ended the month with an MLB-best 50–31 record.

==== July ====
The Angels improved to a 4–0 record in the first game of the new month with a 4–3 victory against the Orioles, taking the series. The Angels, hoping to end the first half with a successful week, continued their road trip in Texas. In the first game, Ervin Santana threw a career-high 11 strikeouts. But it was all for nothing, as the highlight of the game came when the Rangers' Brad Wilkerson hit his third home run of the game, becoming the first American League player (third throughout the league) to hit three home runs in one game. The Angels split the final two games of the series, and concluded their road trip, and the first half of the season, by taking on the New York Yankees.

Three Angels players represented the American League in the 2007 Major League Baseball All-Star Game; Vladimir Guerrero was the leading vote-getter amongst American League outfielders in fan balloting, while John Lackey and Francisco Rodríguez were selected by Jim Leyland, the American League manager for the event. Guerrero won the Home Run Derby, and Rodriguez earned the save in the American League's 5–4 victory.

==== August ====
Guerrero did not hit a home run in a regular-season game in July, in the midst of the longest home run drought of his career. He turned the page once August began, smashing four home runs in two games on the second and third of the month.

=== Season standings ===
AL West
Team	W	L	Pct.	GB	Home	Road
Los Angeles Angels	94	68	.580	—	54‍–‍27	40‍–‍41
Seattle Mariners	88	74	.543	6	49‍–‍33	39‍–‍41
Oakland Athletics	76	86	.469	18	40‍–‍41	36‍–‍45
Texas Rangers	75	87	.463	19	47‍–‍34	28‍–‍53

=== Record vs. opponents ===
2007 American League record Source: MLB Standings Grid – 2007
Team	BAL	BOS	CWS	CLE	DET	KC	LAA	MIN	NYY	OAK	SEA	TB	TEX	TOR	NL
Baltimore	—	6–12	5–3	3–4	1–5	7–0	3–7	0–7	9–9	4–4	2–7	11–7	4–6	8–10	6–12
Boston	12–6	—	7–1	5–2	3–4	3–3	6–4	4–3	8–10	4–4	4–5	13–5	6–4	9–9	12–6
Chicago	3–5	1–7	—	7–11	11–7	12–6	5–4	9–9	4–6	4–5	1–7	6–1	2–4	3–4	4–14
Cleveland	4–3	2–5	11–7	—	12–6	11–7	5–5	14–4	0–6	6–4	4–3	8–2	6–3	4–2	9–9
Detroit	5–1	4–3	7–11	6–12	—	11–7	3–5	12–6	4–4	4–6	6–4	3–4	5–4	4–3	14–4
Kansas City	0–7	3–3	6–12	7–11	7–11	—	5–2	9–9	1–9	6–4	3–6	4–3	5–4	3–4	10–8
Los Angeles	7–3	4–6	4–5	5–5	5–3	2–5	—	6–3	6–3	9–10	13–6	6–2	10–9	3–4	14–4
Minnesota	7–0	3–4	9–9	4–14	6–12	9–9	3–6	—	2–5	5–2	6–3	3–4	7–2	4–6	11–7
New York	9–9	10–8	6–4	6–0	4–4	9–1	3–6	5–2	—	2–4	5–5	10–8	5–1	10–8	10–8
Oakland	4–4	4–4	5–4	4–6	6–4	4–6	10–9	2–5	4–2	—	5–14	4–6	9–10	5–4	10–8
Seattle	7–2	5–4	7–1	3–4	4–6	6–3	6–13	3–6	5–5	14–5	—	4–3	11–8	4–5	9–9
Tampa Bay	7–11	5–13	1–6	2–8	4–3	3–4	2–6	4–3	8–10	6–4	3–4	—	5–4	9–9	7–11
Texas	6–4	4–6	4–2	3–6	4–5	4–5	9–10	2–7	1–5	10–9	8–11	4–5	—	5–5	11–7
Toronto	10–8	9–9	4–3	2–4	3–4	4–3	4–3	6–4	8–10	4–5	5–4	9–9	5–5	—	10–8

=== Roster ===
2007 Los Angeles Angels
Roster
Pitchers: 49 Chris Bootcheck; 52 Jason Bulger; 48 Héctor Carrasco; 40 Bartolo Colón; 45 Kelvim Escobar; 59 Marc Gwyn; 37 Greg Jones; 41 John Lackey; 58 Dustin Moseley; 38 Darren Oliver; 34 Chris Resop; 57 Francisco Rodríguez; 54 Ervin Santana; 51 Joe Saunders; 62 Scot Shields; 33 Justin Speier; 63 Rich Thompson; 36 Jered Weaver	Catchers: 48 Ryan Budde; 5 Jeff Mathis; 28 José Molina; 44 Mike Napoli; Infielders: 32 Erick Aybar; 43 Matt Brown; 18 Orlando Cabrera; 9 Chone Figgins; 12 Shea Hillenbrand; 6 Maicer Izturis; 47 Howie Kendrick; 35 Casey Kotchman; 22 Kendry Morales; 39 Robb Quinlan; 3 Brandon Wood	Outfielders: 16 Garret Anderson; 64 Terry Evans; 25 Nick Gorneault; 27 Vladimir Guerrero; 13 Nathan Haynes; 24,42 Gary Matthews, Jr.; 65 Tommy Murphy; 20 Juan Rivera; 77 Reggie Willits	Manager: 14 Mike Scioscia; Coaches: 23 Mike Butcher (pitching); 21 Dino Ebel (third base); 4 Alfredo Griffin (first base); 7 Mickey Hatcher (hitting); 88 Orlando Mercado (bullpen); 10 Ron Roenicke (bench)

=== Game log ===
2007 game log
April (15–11)

#	Date	Opponent	Score	Win	Loss	Save	Attendance	Record	Stadium	Attendance	Record	GB
1	April 2	Rangers	4–1	Lackey (1–0)	Millwood (0–1)	Rodríguez (1)	Angel Stadium	43,906	1–0	0		
2	April 3	Rangers	8–3	Escobar (1–0)	Padilla (0–1)		Angel Stadium	42,463	2–0	0		
3	April 4	Rangers	5–3	Santana (1–0)	McCarthy (0–1)	Rodríguez (2)	Angel Stadium	35,701	3–0	+1		
4	April 5	Athletics	4–3	Duchscherer (1–0)	Rodríguez (0–1)	Street (1)	Angel Stadium	39,234	3–1	+1/2		
5	April 6	Athletics	5–2	Moseley (1–0)	Kennedy (0–1)	Rodríguez (3)	Angel Stadium	43,534	4–1	+1		
6	April 7	Athletics	2–1	Lackey (2–0)	Haren (0–2)	Shields (1)	Angel Stadium	44,007	5–1	+1 1/2		
7	April 8	Athletics	2–1	Blanton (1–0)	Escobar (1–1)	Street (2)	Angel Stadium	37,783	5–2	+1		
8	April 10	@ Indians	7–6	Sabathia (2–0)	Santana (1–1)	Borowski (2)	Miller Park	19,031	5–3	+1		
9	April 11	@ Indians	4–1	Saunders (1–0)	Westbrook (0–1)	Rodríguez (4)	Miller Park	16,375	6–3	+1		
10	April 12	@ Indians	4–2	Fultz (2–0)	Shields (0–1)	Borowski (3)	Miller Park	17,090	6–4	+1/2		
11	April 13	@ Red Sox	10–1	Wakefield (1–1)	Lackey (2–1)		Fenway Park	35,946	6–5	+1/2		
12	April 14	@ Red Sox	8–0	Schilling (2–1)	Carrasco (0–1)		Fenway Park	36,300	6–6	-1/2		
	April 15	@ Red Sox	Postponed (rain) Rescheduled for August 17				Fenway Park		6–6	-1		
13	April 16	@ Red Sox	7–2	Beckett (3–0)	Santana (1–2)		Fenway Park	35,424	6–7	-1 1/2		
14	April 17	@ Athletics	4–1	Gaudin (1–0)	Weaver (0–1)	Street (3)	McAfee Coliseum	20,174	6–8	-1 1/2		
15	April 18	@ Athletics	3–0	Haren (1–2)	Lackey (2–2)	Street (4)	McAfee Coliseum	17,322	6–9	-2		
16	April 20	Mariners	8–4	Saunders (2–0)	Batista (1–2)	Rodríguez (5)	Angel Stadium	43,359	7–9	-2		
17	April 21	Mariners	7–6	Colón (1–0)	Ramírez (1–1)	Rodríguez (6)	Angel Stadium	41,752	8–9	-1		
18	April 22	Mariners	6–1	Santana (2–2)	Weaver, Jeff (0–3)		Angel Stadium	43,628	9–9	0		
19	April 23	Tigers	9–5	Grilli (2–1)	Weaver (0–2)		Angel Stadium	40,563	9–10	-1		
20	April 24	Tigers	9–8 (10)	Moseley (2–0)	Jones (0–1)		Angel Stadium	36,055	10–10	-1		
21	April 25	Devil Rays	9–1	Lackey (3–2)	Jackson (0–3)		Angel Stadium	36,850	11–10	0		
22	April 26	Devil Rays	11–3	Colón (2–0)	Seo (1–2)		Angel Stadium	35,597	12–10	+1		
23	April 27	@ White Sox	7–3	Contreras (2–2)	Santana (2–3)		U.S. Cellular Field	30,193	12–11	+1/2		
24	April 28	@ White Sox	3–0	Weaver (1–2)	Garland (0–2)	Rodríguez (7)	U.S. Cellular Field	38,208	13–11	+1		
25	April 29	@ White Sox	5–2	Escobar (1–0)	Buehrle (2–1)	Rodríguez (8)	U.S. Cellular Field	38,513	14–11	+1 1/2		
26	April 30	@ Royals	3–1	Lackey (4–2)	Pérez (2–3)	Rodríguez (9)	Kauffman Stadium	10,866	15–11	+2		

May (18–11)

#	Date	Opponent	Score	Win	Loss	Save	Attendance	Record	Stadium	Attendance	Record	GB
27	May 1	@ Royals	7–5	Colón (3–0)	Greinke (1–3)	Rodríguez (10)	Kauffman Stadium	11,225	16–11	+2		
28	May 2	@ Royals	3–1	de la Rosa (3–2)	Santana (2–4)	Soria (4)	Kauffman Stadium	9,697	16–12	+1		
29	May 3	@ Royals	5–2	Meche (3–1)	Weaver (1–3)	Soria (5)	Kauffman Stadium	12,683	16–13	+1		
30	May 4	White Sox	5–1	Escobar (3–1)	Contreras (2–3)	Shields (2)	Angel Stadium	44,126	17–13	+1		
31	May 5	White Sox	6–3	Garland (1–2)	Lackey (4–3)	Jenks (9)	Angel Stadium	42,574	17–14	+1		
32	May 6	White Sox	4–3 (10)	Thornton (2–1)	Rodríguez (0–2)	Jenks (10)	Angel Stadium	42,017	17–15	+1		
33	May 8	Indians	5–1	Lee (1–0)	Santana (2–5)		Angel Stadium	41,731	17–16	0		
34	May 9	Indians	3–2	Moseley (3–0)	Cabrera (1–2)	Rodríguez (11)	Angel Stadium	40,007	18–16	+1/2		
35	May 10	Indians	8–0	Escobar (4–1)	Sowers (0–3)		Angel Stadium	33,698	19–16	+1		
36	May 11	@ Rangers	6–3	Lackey (5–3)	Padilla (1–5)	Shields (3)	Ameriquest Field in Arlington	30,782	20–16	+1		
37	May 12	@ Rangers	6–3	Colón (4–0)	Loe (1–3)	Rodríguez (12)	Ameriquest Field in Arlington	36,474	21–16	+2		
38	May 13	@ Rangers	7–6	Gagné (1–0)	Shields (0–2)		Ameriquest Field in Arlington	24,847	21–17	+1		
39	May 14	@ Rangers	7–2	Weaver (2–3)	Millwood (2–4)		Ameriquest Field in Arlington	23,421	22–17	+2		
40	May 15	@ Mariners	11–3	White (1–0)	Escobar (4–2)		Safeco Field	21,769	22–18	+1		
41	May 16	@ Mariners	5–0	Lackey (6–3)	Baek (1–1)		Safeco Field	22,331	23–18	+2		
42	May 17	@ Mariners	7–3	Colón (5–0)	Washburn (3–4)		Safeco Field	20,488	24–18	+3		
43	May 18	Dodgers	9–1	Santana (3–5)	Penny (5–1)		Angel Stadium	44,342	25–18	+3		
44	May 19	Dodgers	6–2	Weaver (3–3)	Hendrickson (2–1)		Angel Stadium	44,380	26–18	+3		
45	May 20	Dodgers	4–1	Escobar (5–2)	Lowe (4–5)	Rodríguez (13)	Angel Stadium	44,301	27–18	+4		
46	May 22	@ Tigers	6–3	Lackey (7–3)	Maroth (3–1)	Rodríguez (14)	Comerica Park	28,678	28–18	+5 1/2		
47	May 23	@ Tigers	8–7	Durbin (4–1)	Colón (5–1)	Jones (15)	Comerica Park	28,105	28–19	+4 1/2		
48	May 24	@ Tigers	12–0	Bonderman (3–0)	Santana (3–6)		Comerica Park	36,048	28–20	+4		
49	May 25	@ Yankees	10–6	Weaver (4–3)	Clippard (1–1)		Yankee Stadium	50,363	29–20	+4		
50	May 26	@ Yankeess	3–1	Escobar (6–2)	Wang (3–4)	Rodríguez (15)	Yankee Stadium	52,536	30–20	+4 1/2		
51	May 27	@ Yankees	4–3	Lackey (8–3)	Proctor (0–2)	Rodríguez (16)	Yankee Stadium	53,508	31–20	+4 1/2		
52	May 28	Mariners	12–5	Batista (5–4)	Colón (5–2)		Angel Stadium	42,352	31–21	+3 1/2		
53	May 29	Mariners	4–1	Santana (4–6)	Feierabend (0–1)	Rodríguez (17)	Angel Stadium	38,174	32–21	+4 1/2		
54	May 30	Mariners	8–6	Moseley (4–0)	Hernández (3–3)	Rodríguez (18)	Angel Stadium	39,288	33–21	+5 1/2		
55	May 31	Orioles	6–2	Burres (3–2)	Escobar (6–3)		Oriole Park at Camden Yards	42,266	33–22	+4 1/2		

June (17–9)

#	Date	Opponent	Score	Win	Loss	Save	Attendance	Record	Stadium	Attendance	Record	GB
56	June 1	Orioles	3–2	Lackey (9–3)	Cabrera (4–6)	Rodríguez (19)	Angel Stadium	43,012	34–22	+5 1/2		
57	June 2	Orioles	7–4	Saunders (3–0)	Trachsel (4–4)		Angel Stadium	42,190	35–22	+5 1/2		
58	June 3	Orioles	4–3	Bootcheck (1–0)	Ray (3–4)		Angel Stadium	41,026	36–22	+5 1/2		
59	June 4	Twins	16–3	Weaver (5–3)	Bonser (4–2)		Angel Stadium	37,380	37–22	+5 1/2		
60	June 5	Twins	5–1	Escobar (7–3)	Baker (1–1)		Angel Stadium	42,001	38–22	+5 1/2		
61	June 6	Twins	8–5	Slowey (1–0)	Lackey (9–4)	Nathan (13)	Angel Stadium	36,453	38–23	+5 1/2		
62	June 8	@ Cardinals	10–6	Carrasco (1–1)	Johnson (1–1)		Busch Stadium	44,156	39–23	+5 1/2		
63	June 9	@ Cardinals	9–3	Santana (5–6)	Looper (6–5)		Busch Stadium	45,392	40–23	+5 1/2		
64	June 10	@ Cardinals	9–6	Wellemeyer (2–1)	Bootcheck (1–1)		Busch Stadium	43,612	40–24	+4 1/2		
65	June 12	@ Reds	5–3	Coutlangus (3–1)	Moseley (4–1)	Weathers (13)	Great American Ball Park	23,153	40–25	+3		
66	June 13	@ Reds	6–3	Lackey (10–4)	Lohse (3–8)	Rodríguez (20)	Great American Ball Park	29,655	41–25	+4		
67	June 14	@ Reds	9–7	Colón (6–2)	Majewski (0–1)	Rodríguez (21)	Great American Ball Park	32,860	42–25	+5		
68	June 15	@ Dodgers	2–1	Lowe (7–6)	Santana (5–7)	Saito (19)	Dodger Stadium	56,000	42–26	+4		
69	June 16	@ Dodgers	3–0	Weaver (6–3)	Schmidt (1–4)	Rodríguez (22)	Dodger Stadium	56,000	43–26	+5		
70	June 17	@ Dodgers	10–4	Escobar (8–3)	Wolf (8–5)		Dodger Stadium	56,000	44–26	+6		
71	June 18	Astros	10–9	Rodríguez (1–2)	Borkowski (1–1)		Angel Stadium	42,232	45–26	+6		
72	June 19	Astros	9–5	Jennings (1–1)	Colón (6–3)		Angel Stadium	42,156	45–27	+6		
73	June 20	Astros	8–4	Carrasco (2–1)	Borkowski (1–2)		Angel Stadium	40,761	46–27	+6		
74	June 22	Pirates	5–4 (11)	Shields (1–2)	Bayliss (4–3)		Angel Stadium	43,545	47–27	+7		
75	June 23	Pirates	10–1	Escobar (9–3)	Snell (6–5)		Angel Stadium	44,010	48–27	+8		
76	June 24	Pirates	4–3 (10)	Bootcheck (2–1)	Capps (3–4)		Angel Stadium	42,346	49–27	+8		
77	June 25	Royals	5–3	Thomson (1–0)	Lackey (10–5)	Dotel (7)	Angel Stadium	43,895	49–28	+7		
78	June 26	Royals	12–4	Meche (5–6)	Santana (5–8)		Angel Stadium	44,002	49–29	+6		
79	June 27	Royals	1–0	de la Rosa (5–9)	Weaver (6–4)	Dotel (8)	Angel Stadium	41,269	49–30	+5		
80	June 29	@ Orioles	9–7	Shields (2–2)	Ray (4–6)	Rodríguez (23)	Oriole Park at Camden Yards	36,689	50–30	+5		
81	June 30	@ Orioles	6–3	Burres (4–2)	Colón (6–4)	Shuey (1)	Oriole Park at Camden Yards	26,235	50–31	+4		

July (12–12)

#	Date	Opponent	Score	Win	Loss	Save	Attendance	Record	Stadium	Attendance	Record	GB
82	July 1	@ Orioles	4–3	Lackey (11–6)	Guthrie (4–2)	Rodríguez (24)	Oriole Park at Camden Yards	25,058	51–31	+4		
83	July 3	@ Rangers	8–3	Millwood (5–7)	Santana (5–9)		Ameriquest Field in Arlington	24,871	51–32	+4 1/2		
84	July 4	@ Rangers	4–2	Wright (2–2)	Weaver (6–5)	Gagné (11)	Ameriquest Field in Arlington	46,105	51–33	+3 1/2		
85	July 5	@ Rangers	5–2	Escobar (10–3)	Tejeda (5–8)		Ameriquest Field in Arlington	22,062	52–33	+4 1/2		
86	July 6	@ Yankees	14–9	Ramírez (1–0)	Bootcheck (2–2)		Yankee Stadium	52,059	52–34	+3 1/2		
87	July 7	@ Yankees	2–1 (13)	Rodríguez (2–2)	Vizcaíno (4–2)		Yankee Stadium	54,497	53–34	+3 1/2		
88	July 8	@ Yankees	12–0	Wang (9–4)	Santana (5–10)		Yankee Stadium	53,921	53–35	+2 1/2		
July 10: All-Star Game (AL wins, 5–4)				Beckett (BOS)	Young (SD)	Rodríguez (LAA)	AT&T Park	43,965	San Francisco			
89	July 13	Rangers	2–1	Rodríguez (3–2)	Benoit (3–3)		Angel Stadium	44,100	54–35	+3		
90	July 14	Rangers	9–5	Lackey (12–5)	Loe (5–7)		Angel Stadium	44,026	55–35	+3		
91	July 15	Rangers	5–4 (11)	Wilson (1–1)	Speier (0–1)	Gagné (13)	Angel Stadium	44,068	55–36	+3		
92	July 17	@ Devil Rays	8–3	Shields (8–5)	Santana (5–11)		Tropicana Field	9,430	55–37	+2 1/2		
93	July 18	@ Devil Rays	7–2	Kazmir (7–6)	Colón (6–5)		Tropicana Field	13,521	55–38	+1 1/2		
94	July 19	@ Devil Rays	3–0	Escobar (11–3)	Sonnanstine (1–5)	Rodríguez (25)	Tropicana Field	18,163	56–38	+2		
95	July 20	@ Twins	7–5	Silva (8–10)	Lackey (12–6)	Nathan (19)	HHH Metrodome	35,794	56–39	+1		
96	July 21	@ Twins	5–2	Neshek (5–1)	Shields (2–3)	Nathan (20)	HHH Metrodome	33,868	56–40	+1		
97	July 22	@ Twins	7–2	Saunders (4–0)	Garza (1–2)		HHH Metrodome	33,217	57–40	+2		
98	July 23	Athletics	12–6	Kennedy (3–8)	Colón (6–6)		Angel Stadium	43,847	57–41	+2		
99	July 24	Athletics	4–3	DiNardo (5–6)	Escobar (11–4)	Embree (11)	Angel Stadium	43,784	57–42	+2 1/2		
100	July 25	Athletics	7–6	Rodríguez (4–2)	Kennedy (3–9)		Angel Stadium	44,252	58–42	+3 1/2		
101	July 27	Tigers	11–6	Weaver (7–5)	Robertson (6–8)		Angel Stadium	44,042	59–42	+4		
102	July 28	Tigers	10–3	Shields (3–3)	Grilli (5–3)		Angel Stadium	43,122	60–42	+4		
103	July 29	Tigers	13–4	Bootcheck (3–2)	Bonderman (10–3)		Angel Stadium	44,019	61–42	+4		
104	July 30	@ Mariners	2–0	Batista (11–7)	Escobar (11–5)	Putz (31)	Safeco Field	31,232	61–43	+3		
105	July 31	@ Mariners	8–0	Lackey (13–6)	Weaver, Jeff (2–10)		Safeco Field	28,903	62–43	+4		

August (18–11)

#	Date	Opponent	Score	Win	Loss	Save	Attendance	Record	Stadium	Attendance	Record	GB
106	August 1	@ Mariners	8–7 (12)	O'Flaherty (7–0)	Speier (0–2)		Safeco Field	34,471	62–44	+3		
107	August 2	@ Athletics	6–4	Saunders (5–0)	Gaudin (8–7)	Rodríguez (26)	McAfee Coliseum	21,654	63–44	+3 1/2		
108	August 3	@ Athletics	8–4	Casilla (3–1)	Shields (3–4)		McAfee Coliseum	21,552	63–45	+2 1/2		
109	August 4	@ Athletics	2–1	Blanton (9–8)	Escobar (11–6)	Embree (13)	McAfee Coliseum	29,144	63–46	+2 1/2		
110	August 5	@ Athletics	4–3	Lackey (14–6)	Calero (1–5)	Rodríguez (27)	McAfee Coliseum	26,782	64–46	+3 1/2		
111	August 6	Red Sox	4–2	Speier (1–2)	Schilling (6–5)	Rodríguez (28)	Angel Stadium	44,142	65–46	+4		
112	August 7	Red Sox	10–4	Saunders (6–0)	Wakefield (13–10)		Angel Stadium	44,177	66–46	+4		
113	August 8	Red Sox	9–6	Okajima (3–0)	Speier (1–3)	Papelbon (26)	Angel Stadium	44,243	66–47	+3		
114	August 10	Twins	10–1	Escobar (12–6)	Baker (6–5)		Angel Stadium	43,810	67–47	+3 1/2		
115	August 11	Twins	4–3	Lackey (15–6)	Neshek (6–2)	Rodríguez (29)	Angel Stadium	44,064	68–47	+3 1/2		
116	August 12	Twins	6–2	Weaver (8–5)	Bonser (5–9)		Angel Stadium	43,911	69–47	+3 1/2		
117	August 14	@ Blue Jays	4–1	Halladay (14–5)	Saunders (6–1)		Rogers Centre	31,978	69–48	+3		
118	August 15	@ Blue Jays	2–1	Marcum (10–4)	Moseley (4–2)	Accardo (23)	Rogers Centre	30,353	69–49	+3		
119	August 16	@ Blue Jays	4–3	Escobar (13–6)	McGowan (8–7)	Rodríguez (30)	Rogers Centre	27,861	70–49	+3 1/2		
120	August 17	@ Red Sox	8–4	Buchholz (1–0)	Lackey (15–7)	Papelbon (29)	Fenway Park	36,686	70–50	+3		
121	August 17	@ Red Sox	7–5	Rodríguez (5–2)	Gagné (3–1)		Fenway Park	36,538	71–50	+3		
122	August 18	@ Red Sox	10–5	Schilling (7–5)	Weaver (8–6)		Fenway Park	36,652	71–51	+2		
123	August 19	@ Red Sox	3–1	Saunders (7–1)	Tavárez (6–9)	Rodríguez (31)	Fenway Park	36,346	72–51	+2		
124	August 20	Yankees	7–6 (10)	Oliver (1–0)	Henn (2–1)		Angel Stadium	44,249	73–51	+2		
125	August 21	Yankees	18–9	Escobar (14–6)	Mussina (8–9)	Gwyn (1)	Angel Stadium	44,264	74–51	+2		
126	August 22	Yankees	8–2	Pettitte (11–7)	Lackey (15–8)		Angel Stadium	44,326	74–52	+2		
127	August 23	Blue Jays	5–4	Litsch (5–6)	Santana (5–12)	Accardo (25)	Angel Stadium	41,009	74–53	+1		
128	August 24	Blue Jays	3–0	Weaver (9–6)	Halladay (14–6)	Rodríguez (32)	Angel Stadium	41,131	75–53	+1		
129	August 25	Blue Jays	9–2	Marcum (11–5)	Saunders (7–2)		Angel Stadium	41,631	75–54	+1		
130	August 26	Blue Jays	3–1	Escobar (15–6)	McGowan (8–8)	Rodríguez (33)	Angel Stadium	40,565	76–54	+2		
131	August 27	@ Mariners	6–0	Lackey (16–8)	Batista (13–10)		Safeco Field	45,998	77–54	+3		
132	August 28	@ Mariners	10–6	Speier (2–3)	Morrow (3–3)		Safeco Field	44,395	78–54	+4		
133	August 29	@ Mariners	8–2	Weaver (10–6)	Hernández (10–7)		Safeco Field	46,047	79–54	+5		
134	August 31	Rangers	7–6 (10)	Oliver (2–0)	Francisco (1–1)		Angel Stadium	41,012	80–54	+6 1/2		

September (14–14)

#	Date	Opponent	Score	Win	Loss	Save	Attendance	Record	Stadium	Attendance	Record	GB
135	September 1	Rangers	7–6	Vólquez (1–0)	Escobar (15–7)	Wilson (9)	Angel Stadium	38,342	80–55	+6 1/2		
136	September 2	Rangers	8–7	Littleton (3–1)	Shields (3–5)	Wilson (10)	Angel Stadium	40,635	80–56	+6 1/2		
137	September 3	Athletics	9–5	Santana (6–12)	Gaudin (10–10)		Angel Stadium	39,164	81–56	+6 1/2		
138	September 4	Athletics	4–3	Weaver (11–6)	DiNardo (8–8)	Rodríguez (34)	Angel Stadium	39,017	82–56	+7 1/2		
139	September 5	Athletics	6–2	Blanton (12–9)	Saunders (7–3)		Angel Stadium	34,000	82–57	+7 1/2		
140	September 6	Indians	10–3	Escobar (16–7)	Byrd (14–6)		Angel Stadium	41,720	83–57	+8		
141	September 7	Indians	3–2 (10)	Shields (4–5)	Betancourt (4–1)		Angel Stadium	40,020	84–57	+9		
142	September 8	Indians	6–1	Sabathia (17–7)	Santana (6–13)		Angel Stadium	43,544	84–58	+9		
143	September 9	Indians	6–2	Laffey (3–1)	Weaver (11–7)		Angel Stadium	40,037	84–59	+8		
144	September 11	@ Orioles	10–5	Saunders (8–3)	Santos (1–5)		Oriole Park at Camden Yards	15,371	85–59	+9 1/2		
145	September 12	@ Orioles	18–6	Escobar (17–7)	Cabrera (9–16)		Oriole Park at Camden Yards	15,136	86–59	+9 1/2		
146	September 13	@ Orioles	3–0	Leicester (2–1)	Lackey (16–9)	Walker (5)	Oriole Park at Camden Yards	16,359	86–60	+8 1/2		
147	September 14	@ White Sox	5–3	Contreras (9–16)	Colón (6–7)	Jenks (38)	U.S. Cellular Field	33,581	86–61	+7 1/2		
148	September 15	@ White Sox	2–1	Weaver (12–7)	Garland (9–12)	Rodríguez (35)	U.S. Cellular Field	36,485	87–61	+8 1/2		
149	September 16	@ White Sox	9–7	MacDougal (2–5)	Moseley (4–3)		U.S. Cellular Field	29,010	87–62	+8 1/2		
150	September 17	Devil Rays	10–7	Oliver (3–0)	Jackson (4–15)		Angel Stadium	37,530	88–62	+8 1/2		
151	September 18	Devil Rays	2–1	Lackey (17–9)	Hammel (2–5)	Rodríguez (36)	Angel Stadium	36,313	89–62	+8 1/2		
152	September 19	Devil Rays	2–1	Santana (7–13)	Howell (1–5)	Rodríguez (37)	Angel Stadium	33,699	90–62	+8 1/2		
153	September 20	Mariners	9–5	Weaver (13–7)	Feierabend (1–5)		Angel Stadium	40,016	91–62	+9 1/2		
154	September 21	Mariners	6–0	Washburn (10–15)	Saunders (8–4)		Angel Stadium	44,018	91–63	+8 1/2		
155	September 22	Mariners	3–2	Batista (15–11)	Colón (6–8)	Putz (39)	Angel Stadium	43,583	91–64	+7 1/2		
156	y-September 23	Mariners	7–4	Lackey (18–9)	Weaver, Jeff (7–13)	Rodríguez (38)	Angel Stadium	44,234	92–64	+8 1/2		
157	September 24	@ Rangers	8–7	White (2–0)	Santana (7–14)	Littleton (2)	Ameriquest Field in Arlington	22,881	92–65	+8		
158	September 25	@ Rangers	3–1	Wright (4–5)	Oliver (3–1)		Ameriquest Field in Arlington	30,708	92–66	+8		
159	September 26	@ Rangers	16–2	Rheinecker (4–3)	Saunders (8–4)		Ameriquest Field in Arlington	24,223	92–67	+7 1/2		
160	September 28	@ Athletics	2–0	Lackey (19–9)	Haren (15–9)	Rodríguez (39)	McAfee Coliseum	32,287	93–67	+7		
161	September 29	@ Athletics	3–2	Escobar (18–7)	DiNardo (8–10)	Rodríguez (40)	McAfee Coliseum	26,480	94–67	+7		
162	September 30	@ Athletics	3–2	Street (5–2)	Bootcheck (3–3)		McAfee Coliseum	28,062	94–68	+6		

== Playoffs ==
2007 Postseason game log
American League Division Series (0–3)

#	Date	Opponent	Stadium	Score	Win	Loss	Save	Attendance	Record	Box
1	October 3	@ Red Sox	4–0	Beckett (1–0)	Lackey (0–1)		Fenway Park	37,597	0–1	
2	October 5	@ Red Sox	6–3	Papelbon (1–0)	Speier (0–1)		Fenway Park	37,706	0–2	
3	October 7	Red Sox	9–1	Schilling (1–0)	Weaver (0–1)		Angel Stadium	45,262	0–3	

== Team statistical leaders ==
Hitting			Pitching		
Stat	Player	Total	Stat	Player	Total
Avg.	Chone Figgins; Vladimir Guerrero; Orlando Cabrera	.330.324.301	W	John Lackey; Kelvim Escobar; Jered Weaver	19; 18; 13
HR	Vladimir Guerrero; Gary Matthews, Jr. Garret Anderson	27; 18; 16	L	Ervin Santana; John Lackey; Bartolo Colón	14; 9; 8
RBI	Vladimir Guerrero; Orlando Cabrera; Garret Anderson	125; 86; 80	ERA	John Lackey; Kelvim Escobar; Jered Weaver	3.01; 3.40; 3.91
R	Orlando Cabrera; Vladimir Guerrero; Chone Figgins	101; 89; 81	SO	John Lackey; Kelvim Escobar; Ervin Santana	179; 160; 126
H	Orlando Cabrera; Vladimir Guerrero; Chone Figgins	192; 186; 146	SV	Francisco Rodríguez; Scot Shields; Marcus Gwyn	40; 2; 1
SB	Chone Figgins; Reggie Willits; Orlando Cabrera	41; 27; 20	IP	John Lackey; Kelvim Escobar; Jered Weaver	224; 195 2/3; 161

Stats as of September 30, 2007

== Player stats ==
=== Batting ===
Note: G = Games played; AB = At bats; R = Runs; H = Hits; 2B = Doubles; 3B = Triples; HR = Home runs; RBI = Runs batted in; SB = Stolen bases; BB = Walks; AVG = Batting average; SLG = Slugging average

Player	G	AB	R	H	2B	3B	HR	RBI	SB	BB	AVG	SLG
Orlando Cabrera	155	638	101	192	35	1	8	86	20	44	.301	.397
Vladimir Guerrero	150	574	89	186	45	1	27	125	2	71	.324	.547
Gary Matthews Jr.	140	516	79	130	26	3	18	72	18	55	.252	.419
Casey Kotchman	137	443	64	131	37	3	11	68	2	53	.296	.467
Chone Figgins	115	442	81	146	24	6	3	58	41	51	.330	.432
Reggie Willits	136	430	74	126	20	1	0	34	27	69	.293	.344
Garret Anderson	108	417	67	124	31	1	16	80	1	27	.297	.492
Howie Kendrick	88	338	55	109	24	2	5	39	5	9	.322	.450
Maicer Izturis	102	336	47	97	17	2	6	51	7	33	.289	.405
Mike Napoli	75	219	40	54	11	1	10	34	5	33	.247	.443
Shea Hillenbrand	53	197	19	50	5	0	3	22	0	5	.254	.325
Erick Aybar	79	194	18	46	5	1	1	19	4	10	.237	.289
Robb Quinlan	79	178	21	44	9	0	3	21	3	14	.247	.348
Jeff Mathis	59	171	24	36	12	0	4	23	0	15	.211	.351
José Molina	40	125	9	28	8	0	0	10	2	3	.224	.288
Kendrys Morales	43	119	12	35	10	0	4	15	0	6	.294	.479
Nathan Haynes	40	45	10	12	0	1	0	1	1	3	.267	.311
Juan Rivera	14	43	3	12	1	0	2	8	0	1	.279	442
Tommy Murphy	20	38	2	7	1	0	0	2	0	0	.184	.211
Brandon Wood	13	33	2	5	1	0	1	3	0	0	.152	.273
Ryan Budde	12	18	0	3	1	0	0	1	0	0	.167	.222
Terry Evans	8	11	3	1	0	0	1	2	0	2	.091	.364
Matthew Brown	4	5	0	0	0	0	0	0	1	2	.000	.000
Nick Gorneault	2	4	1	0	0	0	0	0	0	1	.000	.000
Pitcher totals	162	20	1	4	1	0	0	2	0	0	.200	.250
Team totals	162	5554	822	1578	324	23	123	776	139	507	.284	.417

=== Pitching ===
Note: W = Wins; L = Losses; ERA = Earned run average; G = Games pitched; GS = Games started; SV = Saves; IP = Innings pitched; H = Hits allowed; R = Runs allowed; ER = Earned runs allowed; BB = Walks allowed; SO = Strikeouts

Player	W	L	ERA	G	GS	SV	IP	H	R	ER	BB	SO
John Lackey	19	9	3.01	33	33	0	224.0	219	87	75	52	179
Kelvin Escobar	18	7	3.40	30	30	0	195.2	182	79	74	66	160
Jared Weaver	13	7	3.91	28	28	0	161.0	178	77	70	45	115
Ervin Santana	7	14	5.76	28	26	0	150.0	174	103	96	58	126
Joe Saunders	8	5	4.44	18	18	0	107.1	129	56	53	34	69
Bartolo Colón	6	8	6.34	19	18	0	99.1	132	74	70	29	76
Dustin Moseley	4	3	4.40	46	8	0	92.0	97	45	45	27	50
Chris Bootcheck	3	3	4.77	51	0	0	77.1	81	43	41	24	56
Scot Shields	4	5	3.86	71	0	2	77.0	62	36	33	33	77
Francisco Rodríguez	5	2	2.81	64	0	40	67.1	50	22	21	34	90
Darren Oliver	3	1	3.78	61	0	0	64.1	58	31	27	23	51
Justin Speier	2	3	2.88	51	0	0	50.0	36	17	16	12	47
Héctor Carrasco	2	1	6.57	29	1	0	38.1	44	34	28	23	33
Greg Jones	0	0	6.23	9	0	0	8.2	10	6	6	5	5
Rich Thompson	0	0	10.80	7	0	0	6.2	10	8	8	3	9
Jason Bulger	0	0	2.84	6	0	0	6.1	5	2	2	3	8
Marcus Gwyn	0	0	11.81	3	0	1	5.1	9	9	7	5	3
Chris Resop	0	0	4.15	4	0	0	4.1	4	2	2	1	2
Team totals	94	68	4.23	162	162	43	1435.0	1480	731	674	477	1156

=== Awards ===
- Vladimir Guerrero – 2007 AL All-Star/2007 Home Run Derby Champion
- John Lackey – 2007 AL All-Star
- Francisco Rodríguez – 2007 AL All-Star

== Farm system ==
Level	Team	League	Manager
AAA	Salt Lake Bees	Pacific Coast League	Brian Harper
AA	Arkansas Travelers	Texas League	Bobby Magallanes
A	Rancho Cucamonga Quakes	California League	Bobby Mitchell
A	Cedar Rapids Kernels	Midwest League	Ever Magallanes
Rookie	AZL Angels	Arizona League	Tyrone Boykin
Rookie	Orem Owlz	Pioneer League	Tom Kotchman

LEAGUE CHAMPIONS: Orem

Records
Preceded by 2006	Los Angeles Angels seasons 2007	Succeeded by 2008
