= 2007 Los Angeles Dodgers season =

2007 Los Angeles Dodgers
- League: National League
- Division: West
- Ballpark: Dodger Stadium
- City: Los Angeles
- Record: 82–80 (.506)
- Divisional place: 4th
- Owners: Frank McCourt
- President: Jamie McCourt
- General managers: Ned Colletti
- Managers: Grady Little
- Television: FSN Prime Ticket; KCAL-TV (9); Vin Scully, Charley Steiner, Steve Lyons
- Radio: KFWB; Vin Scully, Rick Monday, Charley Steiner; KWKW; Jaime Jarrín, Pepe Yñiguez, Fernando Valenzuela

The 2007 Los Angeles Dodgers season was the 118th for the franchise in Major League Baseball, and their 50th season in Los Angeles, California. It started off promisingly with the Dodgers holding the National League West lead for most of the first half of the season. However, the team faded down the stretch and finished the season in fourth place. Two of the teams big free agent signings, pitchers Jason Schmidt and Randy Wolf were injured and missed most of the season. A promising development was the play of several rookies including James Loney and Matt Kemp and the further development of second year catcher Russell Martin, who was named to his first All-Star Game.

== Offseason ==
- March 26, 2007: Acquired Brady Clark and cash from the Milwaukee Brewers for Elmer Dessens

== Regular season ==
=== Season standings ===
==== National League West ====
NL West
| Team | W | L | Pct. | GB | Home | Road |
|---|---|---|---|---|---|---|
| Arizona Diamondbacks | 90 | 72 | .556 | — | 50‍–‍31 | 40‍–‍41 |
| Colorado Rockies | 90 | 73 | .552 | ½ | 51‍–‍31 | 39‍–‍42 |
| San Diego Padres | 89 | 74 | .546 | 1½ | 47‍–‍34 | 42‍–‍40 |
| Los Angeles Dodgers | 82 | 80 | .506 | 8 | 43‍–‍38 | 39‍–‍42 |
| San Francisco Giants | 71 | 91 | .438 | 19 | 39‍–‍42 | 32‍–‍49 |

==== Record vs. opponents ====
2007 National League record Source: MLB Standings Grid – 2007
| Team | AZ | ATL | CHC | CIN | COL | FLA | HOU | LAD | MIL | NYM | PHI | PIT | SD | SF | STL | WAS | AL |
|---|---|---|---|---|---|---|---|---|---|---|---|---|---|---|---|---|---|
| Arizona | — | 4–2 | 4–2 | 2–4 | 8–10 | 6–1 | 5–2 | 8–10 | 2–5 | 3–4 | 5–1 | 5–4 | 10–8 | 10–8 | 4–3 | 6–1 | 8–7 |
| Atlanta | 2–4 | — | 5–4 | 1–6 | 4–2 | 10–8 | 3–3 | 4–3 | 5–2 | 9–9 | 9–9 | 5–1 | 5–2 | 4–3 | 3–4 | 11–7 | 4–11 |
| Chicago | 2–4 | 4–5 | — | 9–9 | 5–2 | 0–6 | 8–7 | 2–5 | 9–6 | 2–5 | 3–4 | 8–7 | 3–5 | 5–2 | 11–5 | 6–1 | 8–4 |
| Cincinnati | 4–2 | 6–1 | 9–9 | — | 2–4 | 4–3 | 4–11 | 2–4 | 8–7 | 2–5 | 2–4 | 9–7 | 2–4 | 4–3 | 6–9 | 1–6 | 7-11 |
| Colorado | 10–8 | 2–4 | 2–5 | 4–2 | — | 3–3 | 3–4 | 12–6 | 4–2 | 4–2 | 4–3 | 4–3 | 11–8 | 10–8 | 3–4 | 4–3 | 10–8 |
| Florida | 1–6 | 8–10 | 6–0 | 3–4 | 3–3 | — | 2–3 | 4–3 | 2–5 | 7–11 | 9–9 | 3–4 | 3–4 | 1–6 | 2–4 | 8–10 | 9–9 |
| Houston | 2–5 | 3–3 | 7–8 | 11–4 | 4–3 | 3-2 | — | 4–3 | 5–13 | 2–5 | 3–3 | 5–10 | 4–3 | 2–4 | 7–9 | 2–5 | 9–9 |
| Los Angeles | 10–8 | 3–4 | 5–2 | 4–2 | 6–12 | 3–4 | 3–4 | — | 3–3 | 5–5 | 4–2 | 5–2 | 8–10 | 10–8 | 3–3 | 5–1 | 5–10 |
| Milwaukee | 5–2 | 2–5 | 6–9 | 7–8 | 2–4 | 5–2 | 13–5 | 3–3 | — | 2–4 | 3–4 | 10–6 | 2–5 | 4–5 | 7–8 | 4–2 | 8–7 |
| New York | 4–3 | 9–9 | 5–2 | 5–2 | 2–4 | 11–7 | 5–2 | 5–5 | 4–2 | — | 6–12 | 4–2 | 2–4 | 4–2 | 5–2 | 9–9 | 8–7 |
| Philadelphia | 1-5 | 9–9 | 4–3 | 4–2 | 3–4 | 9–9 | 3–3 | 2–4 | 4–3 | 12–6 | — | 4–2 | 4–3 | 4–4 | 6–3 | 12–6 | 8–7 |
| Pittsburgh | 4–5 | 1–5 | 7–8 | 7–9 | 3–4 | 4–3 | 10–5 | 2–5 | 6–10 | 2–4 | 2–4 | — | 1–6 | 4–2 | 6–12 | 4–2 | 5–10 |
| San Diego | 8–10 | 2–5 | 5–3 | 4–2 | 8–11 | 4–3 | 3–4 | 10–8 | 5–2 | 4–2 | 3–4 | 6–1 | — | 14–4 | 3–4 | 4–2 | 6–9 |
| San Francisco | 8–10 | 3–4 | 2–5 | 3–4 | 8–10 | 6–1 | 4–2 | 8–10 | 5–4 | 2–4 | 4–4 | 2–4 | 4–14 | — | 4–1 | 3–4 | 5–10 |
| St. Louis | 3–4 | 4–3 | 5–11 | 9–6 | 4–3 | 4-2 | 9–7 | 3–3 | 8–7 | 2–5 | 3–6 | 12–6 | 4–3 | 1–4 | — | 1–5 | 6–9 |
| Washington | 1–6 | 7–11 | 1–6 | 6–1 | 3–4 | 10-8 | 5–2 | 1–5 | 2–4 | 9–9 | 6–12 | 2–4 | 2–4 | 4–3 | 5–1 | — | 9–9 |

=== Season summary ===
==== April ====
The Dodgers began their 2007 season on the road as they went to Milwaukee to begin a three-game series with the Brewers. But the Brewers pitching shut down the Dodgers offense for the first two games of the series. They got their own pitching settled down as they enjoyed a four-game winning streak, including a three-game sweep of the Giants in San Francisco. The Dodgers went to Dodger Stadium for the first time of the season and had a successful 4-2 homestand.

A two-game mini-series sweep in Arizona against the Diamondbacks followed by a split of a two-game series against the Rockies saw the Dodgers go 3-1 on the road-trip. Back in Los Angeles, the Dodgers won the first two games of a three-game series with the Pirates, improving their record to a league-leading 13-5 in the process before a four-game losing streak, including being swept by the Giants, dropped their record to 13-9. They ended their April with a 15-11 record, leading the NL West.

==== May ====
May began with the Dodgers concluding their three-game series with the Diamondbacks with a pair of 2-1 victories. After splitting the first two games of a three-game series with the Braves, the Dodgers blew a late lead in the third game of the series due to poor relief pitching. The Braves won the game 6-4 and took the series two games to one. The Dodgers continued their roadtrip with the Marlins, splitting the four game series. The Dodgers then began a 6-game homestand against the Reds and the Cardinals. They went on to have a 5-1 homestand, sweeping Reds and taking 2 out of 3 from the Cardinals. The Dodgers were then swept in a 3-game weekend series with the Angels played in Anaheim. The Dodgers returned home to face the Brewers whom they beat two in a row after dropping the first game of the series. The Dodgers then took two of the three games they played with the Cubs at Dodger Stadium. In Washington, they took two out of three games, shutting out the Nationals in the first two games.

==== June ====
The Dodgers beat the Pirates in the first game of a four-game series in Pittsburgh, the Pirates held the Dodgers to just one run in a 3-1 victory. The next day the Dodgers came from a 4-0 deficit to win 5-4. The Dodgers then went to San Diego to play the Padres and were swept there despite having a 5-1 lead in the 9th inning of the last game. The Dodgers also dropped out of first place during this time. Interleague play then begun with the Blue Jays coming to Los Angeles. The Dodgers were able to end a three-game losing streak in 10 innings, with a walk off home run but then lost the next two games from the Blue Jays. They then swept the 1st Place team of the NL East, the Mets in a three-game series at Dodger Stadium. The Freeway Series then returned, this time to Dodger Stadium where the Dodgers stole the first game from the Angels, but then lost the next two. The Dodgers then had a ten-game road trip to Toronto, Tampa Bay, and Arizona. They went 6-4 on the road trip. They returned home to play their division rivals, the Padres and lost the first two games. They ended June with an even 14-14 record.

==== July ====
The Dodgers went 3-4 before the All Star Break, dropping two out of four games from the Atlanta Braves and two out of three games from the Florida Marlins. After the All Star Break, the Dodgers completed a sweep of the Giants in San Francisco. This year in San Francisco, they are 6-0. The Dodgers got 2 out of 3 games from the Philadelphia Phillies and took 1 out of 3 from the New York Mets. Relief pitching became a great concern for the Dodgers after the All Star Break, with some relievers pitching an entire series, or more consecutive games.

=== Game log ===
2007 game log
April

| # | Date | Opponent | Score | Win | Loss | Save | Attendance | Record |
|---|---|---|---|---|---|---|---|---|
| 1 | April 2 | @ Brewers | 7–1 | Sheets (1–0) | Lowe (0–1) | | 45,341 | 0–1 |
| 2 | April 3 | @ Brewers | 4–3 | Shouse (1–0) | Wolf (0–1) | Cordero (1) | 22,603 | 0–2 |
| 3 | April 4 | @ Brewers | 5–4 | Schmidt (1–0) | Suppan (0–1) | Saito (1) | 23,649 | 1–2 |
| 4 | April 6 | @ Giants | 2–1 | Penny (1–0) | Lowry (0–1) | Saito (2) | 43,146 | 2–2 |
| 5 | April 7 | @ Giants | 4–1 | Lowe (1–1) | Ortiz (0–1) | Saito (3) | 42,098 | 3–2 |
| 6 | April 8 | @ Giants | 10–4 | Wolf (1–1) | Zito (0–2) | | 39,343 | 4–2 |
| 7 | April 9 | Rockies | 6–3 | Francis (1–0) | Schmidt (1–1) | | 56,000 | 4–3 |
| 8 | April 10 | Rockies | 2–1 | Beimel (1–0) | Kim (1–1) | Saito (4) | 40,560 | 5–3 |
| 9 | April 11 | Rockies | 3–0 | Penny (2–0) | Hirsh (1–1) | Saito (5) | 35,852 | 6–3 |
| 10 | April 13 | Padres | 9–1 | Lowe (2–1) | Wells (0–1) | | 49,090 | 7–3 |
| 11 | April 14 | Padres | 7–4 | Peavy (2–0) | Schmidt (1–2) | | 55,942 | 7–4 |
| 12 | April 15 | Padres | 9–3 | Wolf (2–1) | Young (1–1) | | 55,298 | 8–4 |
| 13 | April 16 | @ D-backs | 5–1 | Penny (3–0) | González (1–1) | | 27,427 | 9-4 |
| 14 | April 17 | @ D-backs | 6–4 | Billingsley (1–0) | Peña (0–1) | Saito (6) | 25,735 | 10–4 |
| 15 | April 18 | @ Rockies | 7–2 | Buchholz (1–0) | Lowe (2–2) | | 20,366 | 10–5 |
| 16 | April 19 | @ Rockies | 8–1 | Hendrickson (1–0) | Cook (0–1) | | 19,135 | 11–5 |
| 17 | April 20 | Pirates | 10–2 | Wolf (3–1) | Armas (0–2) | | 43,845 | 12–5 |
| 18 | April 21 | Pirates | 7–3 (10) | Broxton (1–0) | Bayliss (1–1) | | 48,995 | 13–5 |
| 19 | April 22 | Pirates | 7–5 | Gorzelanny (3–0) | Tomko (0–1) | Torres (6) | 46,741 | 13–6 |
| 20 | April 24 | Giants | 5–3 | Morris (3–0) | Lowe (2–3) | Benítez (5) | 44,001 | 13–7 |
| 21 | April 25 | Giants | 6–4 | Lowry (2–2) | Wolf (3–2) | Benítez (6) | 43,963 | 13–8 |
| 22 | April 26 | Giants | 5–4 | Correia (1–1) | Beimel (1–1) | Benítez (7) | 56,000 | 13–9 |
| 23 | April 27 | @ Padres | 6–5 | Seánez (1–0) | Hoffman (1–2) | Saito (7) | 44,035 | 14–9 |
| 24 | April 28 | @ Padres | 3–2 | Maddux (2–2) | Tomko (0–2) | Hoffman (5) | 42,385 | 14–10 |
| 25 | April 29 | @ Padres | 5–4 (17) | Billingsley (1–0) | Hampson (0–1) | | 44,028 | 15–10 |
| 26 | April 30 | D-backs | 9–1 | Webb (2–1) | Wolf (3–3) | | 53,126 | 15–11 |

May

| # | Date | Opponent | Score | Win | Loss | Save | Attendance | Record |
|---|---|---|---|---|---|---|---|---|
| 27 | May 1 | D-backs | 2–1 | Saito (1–0) | Lyon (2–1) | | 36,029 | 16–11 |
| 28 | May 2 | D-backs | 2–1 | Hendrickson (2–0) | Davis (2–3) | Saito (8) | 34,825 | 17–11 |
| 29 | May 4 | @ Braves | 4–0 | Smoltz (4–1) | Tomko (0–3) | | 38,263 | 17–12 |
| 30 | May 5 | @ Braves | 6–3 | Lowe (3–3) | Hudson (3–1) | Saito (9) | 42,786 | 18–12 |
| 31 | May 6 | @ Braves | 6–4 | Paronto (2–0) | Tsao (0–1) | González (1) | 33,350 | 18–13 |
| 32 | May 7 | @ Marlins | 6–1 | Penny (4–0) | Nolasco (1–1) | | 12,252 | 19-13 |
| 33 | May 8 | @ Marlins | 6–5 | Owens (2–0) | Broxton (1–1) | | 11,124 | 19-14 |
| 34 | May 9 | @ Marlins | 5–3 | Tomko (1–3) | Willis (5–2) | Saito (10) | 12,213 | 20–14 |
| 35 | May 10 | @ Marlins | 3–0 | Tankersley (2–0) | Lowe (3–4) | | 20,345 | 20–15 |
| 36 | May 11 | Reds | 2–0 | Wolf (4–3) | Arroyo (2–3) | Saito (11) | 49,588 | 21–15 |
| 37 | May 12 | Reds | 7–3 | Penny (5–0) | Lohse (1–4) | | 51,776 | 22–15 |
| 38 | May 13 | Reds | 10–5 | Broxton (2–1) | Saarloos (0–3) | | 41,399 | 23–15 |
| 39 | May 14 | Cardinals | 8–4 | Thompson (2–0) | Tomko (1–4) | Isringhausen (10) | 35,707 | 23–16 |
| 40 | May 15 | Cardinals | 9–7 | Lowe (4–4) | Wainwright (3–3) | Saito (12) | 38,954 | 24–16 |
| 41 | May 16 | Cardinals | 5–4 | Wolf (5–3) | Wells (1–8) | Saito (13) | 38,252 | 25–16 |
| 42 | May 18 | @ Angels | 9–1 | Santana (3–5) | Penny (5–1) | | 44,342 | 25–17 |
| 43 | May 19 | @ Angels | 6–2 | Weaver (3–3) | Hendrickson (2–1) | | 44,380 | 25–18 |
| 44 | May 20 | @ Angels | 4–1 | Escobar (5–2) | Lowe (4–5) | Rodríguez (13) | 44,301 | 25–19 |
| 45 | May 21 | Brewers | 9–5 | Suppan (6–4) | Tomko (1–5) | | 33,446 | 25–20 |
| 46 | May 22 | Brewers | 3–2 | Wolf (6–3) | Sheets (4–3) | Saito (14) | 33,552 | 26–20 |
| 47 | May 23 | Brewers | 5–1 | Penny (6–1) | Capuano (5–3) | | 35,609 | 27–20 |
| 48 | May 25 | Cubs | 9–8 | Seánez (2–0) | Ohman (0–2) | Saito (15) | 46,011 | 28–20 |
| 49 | May 26 | Cubs | 4–2 | Zambrano (5–4) | Hendrickson (2–2) | Dempster (11) | 48,243 | 28–21 |
| 50 | May 27 | Cubs | 2–1 (11) | Billingsley (3–0) | Guzmán (0–1) | | 51,198 | 29-21 |
| 51 | May 29 | @ Nationals | 10–0 | Penny (7–1) | Simontacchi (2–3) | | 18,483 | 30–21 |
| 52 | May 30 | @ Nationals | 5–0 | Lowe (5–5) | Bacsik (1–1) | | 22,360 | 31–21 |
| 53 | May 31 | @ Nationals | 11–4 | Bowie (2–2) | Hendrickson (2–3) | | 20,982 | 31–22 |

June

| # | Date | Opponent | Score | Win | Loss | Save | Attendance | Record |
|---|---|---|---|---|---|---|---|---|
| 54 | June 1 | @ Pirates | 5–4 | Wolf (7–3) | Duke (2–6) | Saito (16) | 20,164 | 32–22 |
| 55 | June 2 | @ Pirates | 3–1 | Snell (5–4) | Kuo (0–1) | Capps (1) | 31,931 | 32–23 |
| 56 | June 3 | @ Pirates | 5–4 | Billingsley (4–0) | Torres (0–2) | Beimel (1) | 23,458 | 33–23 |
| 57 | June 4 | @ Pirates | 6–5 | Lowe (6–5) | Maholm (2–8) | Broxton (1) | 15,836 | 34–23 |
| 58 | June 5 | @ Padres | 1–0 | Linebrink (2–1) | Seánez (2–1) | Hoffman (17) | 31,703 | 34–24 |
| 59 | June 6 | @ Padres | 5–2 | Maddux (5–3) | Wolf (7–4) | Hoffman (18) | 31,541 | 34–25 |
| 60 | June 7 | @ Padres | 6–5 | Hampson (2–1) | Broxton (2–2) | | 40,631 | 34–26 |
| 61 | June 8 | Blue Jays | 4–3 (10) | Seánez (3–1) | Accardo (1–2) | | 52,173 | 35–26 |
| 62 | June 9 | Blue Jays | 1–0 | Marcum (3–2) | Lowe (6–6) | Janssen (3) | 51,057 | 35–27 |
| 63 | June 10 | Blue Jays | 11–5 | Halladay (6–2) | Schmidt (1–3) | | 50,183 | 35–28 |
| 64 | June 11 | Mets | 5–3 | Wolf (8–4) | Hernández (3–2) | Saito (17) | 40,467 | 36–28 |
| 65 | June 12 | Mets | 4–1 | Kuo (1–1) | Maine (6–4) | Saito (18) | 42,438 | 37–28 |
| 66 | June 13 | Mets | 9–1 | Penny (8–1) | Sosa (6–2) | | 46,894 | 38–28 |
| 67 | June 15 | Angels | 2–1 | Lowe (7–6) | Santana (5–7) | Saito (19) | 56,000 | 39-28 |
| 68 | June 16 | Angels | 3–0 | Weaver (6–3) | Schmidt (1–4) | Rodríguez (22) | 56,000 | 39-29 |
| 69 | June 17 | Angels | 10–4 | Escobar (8–3) | Wolf (8–5) | | 56,000 | 39-30 |
| 70 | June 19 | @ Blue Jays | 10–1 | Penny (9-1) | McGowan (3–3) | | 22,763 | 40–30 |
| 71 | June 20 | @ Blue Jays | 12–1 | Halladay (8–2) | Kuo (1–2) | | 24,413 | 40–31 |
| 72 | June 21 | @ Blue Jays | 8–4 | Seánez (4–1) | Janssen (2–1) | | 25,265 | 41–31 |
| 73 | June 22 | @ Devil Rays | 6–3 | Lowe (8–6) | Sonnanstine (1–2) | Saito (20) | 14,961 | 42–31 |
| 74 | June 23 | @ Devil Rays | 4–3 | Fossum (5–6) | Wolf (8–6) | Reyes (17) | 24,068 | 42–32 |
| 75 | June 24 | @ Devil Rays | 9–4 | Jackson (1–8) | Kuo (1–3) | | 18,248 | 42–33 |
| 76 | June 25 | @ D-backs | 8–1 | Penny (10–1) | Owings (5–2) | | 24,966 | 43–33 |
| 77 | June 26 | @ D-backs | 6–5 (10) | Broxton (3–2) | Slaten (3–1) | Saito (21) | 28,734 | 44–33 |
| 78 | June 27 | @ D-backs | 2–0 | Webb (8–4) | Lowe (8–7) | Valverde (25) | 26,867 | 44–34 |
| 79 | June 28 | @ D-backs | 9–5 | Wolf (9-6) | Johnson (3–4) | Saito (22) | 26,526 | 45–34 |
| 80 | June 29 | Padres | 7–6 | Young (8–3) | Kuo (1–4) | Hoffman (22) | 52,050 | 45–35 |
| 81 | June 30 | Padres | 3–1 (12) | Ring (1–0) | Tomko (1–6) | Hoffman (23) | 53,769 | 45–36 |

July

| # | Date | Opponent | Score | Win | Loss | Save | Attendance | Record |
|---|---|---|---|---|---|---|---|---|
| 82 | July 1 | Padres | 5–0 | Billingsley (5–0) | Germano (5–2) | | 48,632 | 46–36 |
| 83 | July 2 | Braves | 8–2 | Beimel (2–1) | Smoltz (9-5) | | 40,571 | 47–36 |
| 84 | July 3 | Braves | 7–6 | Seánez (5–1) | Ledezma (0–1) | Saito (23) | 43,052 | 48–36 |
| 85 | July 4 | Braves | 5–2 | James (8–7) | Hendrickson (2–4) | Wickman (15) | 56,000 | 48–37 |
| 86 | July 5 | Braves | 8–6 | Moylan (3–1) | Stults (0–1) | Wickman (16) | 41,052 | 48–38 |
| 87 | July 6 | Marlins | 6–5 (10) | Pinto (1–3) | Tomko (1–7) | Gregg (18) | 51,050 | 48–39 |
| 88 | July 7 | Marlins | 7–2 | Mitre (3–4) | Lowe (8–8) | | 46,177 | 48–40 |
| 89 | July 8 | Marlins | 9–3 | Hendrickson (3–4) | Olsen (6–7) | | 44,021 | 49-40 |
| 90 | July 13 | @ Giants | 9–1 | Billingsley (6–0) | Cain (3–10) | | 43,230 | 50–40 |
| 91 | July 14 | @ Giants | 8–7 (12) | Hendrickson (4–4) | Misch (0–1) | Seánez (1) | 43,452 | 51–40 |
| 92 | July 15 | @ Giants | 5–3 | Tomko (2–7) | Lowry (9-7) | Saito (24) | 43,446 | 52–40 |
| 93 | July 16 | Phillies | 10–3 | Penny (11–1) | Moyer (7–8) | | 41,458 | 53–40 |
| 94 | July 17 | Phillies | 15–3 | Durbin (1–2) | Hendrickson (4–5) | | 45,074 | 53–41 |
| 95 | July 18 | Phillies | 5–4 | Seánez (6–1) | Kendrick (4–1) | Saito (25) | 47,114 | 54–41 |
| 96 | July 19 | Mets | 13–9 | Sele (3–0) | Lowe (8–9) | | 51,651 | 54–42 |
| 97 | July 20 | Mets | 4–1 | Pérez (9-6) | Hernández (3–2) | Wagner (21) | 52,103 | 54–43 |
| 98 | July 21 | Mets | 8–6 | Penny (12–1) | Sosa (7–5) | Broxton (2) | 49,124 | 55–43 |
| 99 | July 22 | Mets | 5–4 (10) | Feliciano (2–1) | Houlton (0–1) | Wagner (22) | 49,092 | 55–44 |
| 100 | July 23 | @ Astros | 10–2 | Billingsley (7–0) | Sampson (7–7) | | 38,245 | 56–44 |
| 101 | July 24 | @ Astros | 7–4 | Jennings(2–6) | Seánez (6–2) | Lidge (4) | 38,247 | 56–45 |
| 102 | July 25 | @ Astros | 2–1 | Qualls (6–3) | Houlton (0–2) | Lidge (5) | 31,498 | 56–46 |
| 103 | July 26 | @ Rockies | 5–4 | Penny (13–1) | López (5–4) | Saito (26) | 49,124 | 57–46 |
| -- | July 27 | @ Rockies | Postponed (rain) Rescheduled for September 18 | | | | | 57–46 |
| 104 | July 28 | @ Rockies | 6–2 | Francis (11–5) | Tomko (2–8) | | 46,039 | 57–47 |
| 105 | July 29 | @ Rockies | 9–6 | Jiménez (1–0) | Billingsley (7–1) | Corpas (6) | 38,167 | 57–48 |
| 106 | July 31 | Giants | 3–1 | Lowry (12–7) | Penny (13–2) | Hennessey (9) | 56,000 | 57–49 |

August

| # | Date | Opponent | Score | Win | Loss | Save | Attendance | Record |
|---|---|---|---|---|---|---|---|---|
| 107 | August 1 | Giants | 6–8 | Broxton (4–2) | Messenger (1–3) | Saito (27) | 56,000 | 58–49 |
| 108 | August 2 | Giants | 4–2 | Zito (8–10) | Tomko (2–9) | Kline (2) | 56,000 | 58–50 |
| 109 | August 3 | D-backs | 1–0 | Davis (8–10) | Billingsley (7–2) | Valverde (32) | 51,582 | 58–51 |
| 110 | August 4 | D-backs | 8–7 | Hernández (7–7) | Lowe (8–10) | Valverde (33) | 52,921 | 58–52 |
| 111 | August 5 | D-backs | 3–0 | Webb (11–8) | Penny (13–3) | | 48,803 | 58–53 |
| 112 | August 7 | @ Reds | 4–0 | Arroyo (5–12) | Hendrickson (4–6) | | 22,057 | 58–54 |
| 113 | August 8 | @ Reds | 1–0 | Harang (11–3) | Billingsley (7–3) | Weathers (22) | 20,462 | 58–55 |
| 114 | August 9 | @ Reds | 5–4 (11) | Proctor (3–5) | Santos (1–4) | Saito (28) | 25,965 | 59-55 |
| 115 | August 10 | @ Cardinals | 2–1 | Beimel (3–1) | Wainwright (10–9) | Saito (29) | 44,595 | 60–55 |
| 116 | August 11 | @ Cardinals | 6–1 | Looper (10–9) | Lowe (8–11) | | 44,260 | 60–56 |
| 117 | August 12 | @ Cardinals | 12–2 | Reyes (2–11) | Hendrickson (4–7) | | 45,379 | 60–57 |
| 118 | August 13 | Astros | 4–1 | Oswalt (13–6) | Billingsley (7–4) | Qualls (3) | 49,511 | 60–58 |
| 119 | August 14 | Astros | 7–4 | Albers (3–5) | Tomko (2–10) | Lidge (9) | 49,399 | 60–59 |
| 120 | August 15 | Astros | 6–3 | Penny (14–3) | Jennings (2–8) | Saito (30) | 49,098 | 61–59 |
| 121 | August 16 | Astros | 6–2 | Lowe (9-11) | Rodríguez (7–11) | Saito (31) | 48,128 | 62–59 |
| 122 | August 17 | Rockies | 6–4 | Stults (1–1) | Fogg (7–8) | Saito (32) | 48,072 | 63–59 |
| 123 | August 18 | Rockies | 7–4 (14) | Herges (2–0) | Hernández (3–3) | Corpas (11) | 52,508 | 63–60 |
| 124 | August 19 | Rockies | 4–3 | Proctor (4–5) | Julio (0–4) | Saito (33) | 48,732 | 64–60 |
| 125 | August 21 | @ Phillies | 5–4 | Kendrick (6–3) | Tomko (2–11) | Myers (12) | 35,326 | 64–61 |
| 126 | August 22 | @ Phillies | 15–3 | Lowe (10–11) | Durbin (5–3) | | 37,321 | 65–61 |
| 127 | August 23 | @ Phillies | 5–2 | Billingsley (8–4) | Romero (1–2) | Saito (34) | 37,875 | 66–61 |
| 128 | August 24 | @ Mets | 5–2 | Pérez (12–8) | Penny (14–4) | | 53,250 | 66–62 |
| 129 | August 25 | @ Mets | 4–3 | Hernández (9-4) | Stults (1–2) | Heilman (1) | 52,655 | 66–63 |
| 130 | August 26 | @ Mets | 6–2 | Wells (6–8) | Maine (13–8) | | 49,234 | 67–63 |
| 131 | August 27 | Nationals | 5–4 | Lowe (11–11) | Bacsik (5–8) | Saito (35) | 46,944 | 68–63 |
| 132 | August 28 | Nationals | 4–3 | Billingsley (9-4) | Schroder (1–1) | Saito (36) | 49,698 | 69-63 |
| 133 | August 29 | Nationals | 10–9 (12) | Proctor (5–5) | Rivera (4–5) | | 41,913 | 70–63 |
| 134 | August 31 | @ Padres | 6–4 | Brocail (5–1) | Seánez (6–3) | Hoffman (36) | 44,324 | 70–64 |

September

| # | Date | Opponent | Score | Win | Loss | Save | Attendance | Record |
|---|---|---|---|---|---|---|---|---|
| 135 | September 1 | @ Padres | 7–0 | Peavy (16–5) | Lowe (11–12) | | 42,605 | 70–65 |
| 136 | September 2 | @ Padres | 5–0 | Billingsley (10–4) | Germano (7–8) | | 40,776 | 71–65 |
| 137 | September 3 | @ Cubs | 11–3 | Loaiza (2–0) | Zambrano (14–12) | | 41,070 | 72–65 |
| 138 | September 4 | @ Cubs | 6–2 | Penny (15–4) | Trachsel (6–9) | | 37,834 | 73–65 |
| 139 | September 5 | @ Cubs | 8–2 | Lilly (14–7) | Stults (1–3) | | 39,559 | 73–66 |
| 140 | September 6 | @ Cubs | 7–4 | Beimel (4–1) | Dempster (2–5) | Saito (37) | 39,397 | 74–66 |
| 141 | September 7 | @ Giants | 5–4 | Hennessey (3–4) | Broxton (4–3) | | 40,016 | 74–67 |
| 142 | September 8 | @ Giants | 6–2 | Wells (7–8) | Zito (9-12) | | 42,228 | 75–67 |
| 143 | September 9 | @ Giants | 4–2 | Walker (1–0) | Beimel (4–2) | Hennessey (19) | 40,650 | 75–68 |
| 144 | September 11 | Padres | 9–4 | Peavy (17–6) | Loaiza (2–1) | | 51,620 | 75–69 |
| 145 | September 12 | Padres | 6–1 | Billingsley (11–4) | Germano (7–10) | | 43,699 | 76–69 |
| 146 | September 13 | Padres | 6–3 | Wells (8–8) | Maddux (12–10) | Saito (38) | 44,496 | 77–69 |
| 147 | September 14 | D-backs | 7–4 | Penny (16–4) | Davis (13–12) | Saito (39) | 54,014 | 78–69 |
| 148 | September 15 | D-backs | 6–2 | Lowe (12–12) | Hernández (10–10) | | 48,366 | 79-69 |
| 149 | September 16 | D-backs | 6–1 | González (8–2) | Loaiza (2–2) | | 51,460 | 79-70 |
| 150 | September 18 | @ Rockies | 3–1 | Francis (16–8) | Billingsley (11–5) | Corpas (15) | 23,282 | 79-71 |
| 151 | September 18 | @ Rockies | 9–8 | Speier (1–1) | Saito (1–1) | | 23,271 | 79-72 |
| 152 | September 19 | @ Rockies | 6–5 | Fuentes (2–5) | Broxton (4–4) | Corpas (16) | 26,184 | 79-73 |
| 153 | September 20 | @ Rockies | 9–4 | Jiménez (4–4) | Lowe (12–13) | | 23,147 | 79-74 |
| 154 | September 21 | @ D-backs | 12–3 | Hernández (11–10) | Loaiza (2–3) | | 37,753 | 79-75 |
| 155 | September 22 | @ D-backs | 6–2 | Webb (17–10) | Wells (8–9) | | 47,673 | 79-76 |
| 156 | September 23 | @ D-backs | 7–1 | Billingsley (12–5) | González (8–3) | | 43,372 | 80–76 |
| 157 | September 25 | Rockies | 9–7 | Speier (3–1) | Hendrickson (4–8) | Corpas (17) | 44,660 | 80–77 |
| 158 | September 26 | Rockies | 2–0 | Fogg (10–9) | Lowe (12–14) | Corpas (18) | 45,036 | 80–78 |
| 159 | September 27 | Rockies | 10–4 | Morales (3–2) | Loaiza (2–4) | | 51,999 | 80–79 |
| 160 | September 28 | Giants | 8–3 | Wells (9-9) | Correia (4–7) | | 47,696 | 81–79 |
| 161 | September 29 | Giants | 6–5 (10) | Saito (2–1) | Giese (0–2) | | 51,983 | 82–79 |
| 162 | September 30 | Giants | 11–2 | Zito (11–13) | Stults (1–4) | | 49,211 | 82–80 |

== Team leaders ==
=== Batting ===
| Stat | Player | Total |
|---|---|---|
| Avg. | Jeff Kent | .302 |
| HR | Jeff Kent | 20 |
| RBI | Russell Martin | 87 |
| R | Juan Pierre | 96 |
| SB | Juan Pierre | 64 |

=== Pitching ===
| Stat | Player | Total |
|---|---|---|
| W | Brad Penny | 16 |
| SV | Takashi Saito | 39 |
| IP | Brad Penny | 208 |
| ERA | Brad Penny | 3.03 |

=== Opening Day lineup ===
Opening Day starters
| Name | Position |
|---|---|
| Juan Pierre | Center fielder |
| Russell Martin | Catcher |
| Nomar Garciaparra | First baseman |
| Jeff Kent | Second baseman |
| Luis Gonzalez | Left fielder |
| Wilson Betemit | Third baseman |
| Andre Ethier | Right fielder |
| Ramón Martínez | Shortstop |
| Derek Lowe | Starting pitcher |

=== Notable transactions ===
- July 31, 2007: Acquired Scott Proctor from the New York Yankees for Wilson Betemit.
- August 9, 2007: Acquired Mark Sweeney from the San Francisco Giants for cash.
- August 10, 2007: Signed infielder Shea Hillenbrand.
- August 11, 2007: Acquired Chad Moeller from the Cincinnati Reds for cash.
- August 25, 2007: Signed pitcher David Wells.
- August 30, 2007: Claimed pitcher Esteban Loaiza off waivers from the Oakland Athletics.

=== Roster ===
2007 Los Angeles Dodgers
Roster
| Pitchers: 97 Joe Beimel; 58 Chad Billingsley; 43 Yhency Brazobán; 51 Jonathan Broxton; 30 Mark Hendrickson; 36 Roberto Hernández; 54 D.J. Houlton; 57 Eric Hull; 56 Hong-Chih Kuo; 25 Esteban Loaiza; 23 Derek Lowe; 63 Jonathan Meloan; 31 Brad Penny; 45 Scott Proctor; 44 Takashi Saito; 29 Jason Schmidt; 38 Rudy Seánez; 50 Eric Stults; 45 Brett Tomko; 41 Chin-hui Tsao; 33 David Wells; 52 Randy Wolf | Catchers: 14 Mike Lieberthal; 55 Russell Martin; 47 Chad Moeller; Infielders: 6 Tony Abreu; 21 Marlon Anderson; 10 Wilson Betemit; 15 Rafael Furcal; 5 Nomar Garciaparra; 28 Shea Hillenbrand; 60 Chin-Lung Hu; 12 Jeff Kent; 28,10 Andy LaRoche; 7 James Loney; 18 Ramón Martínez; 8 Olmedo Sáenz; 21 Mark Sweeney; 13 Wilson Valdéz | Outfielders: 3 Brady Clark; 16 Andre Ethier; 26 Luis Gonzalez; 27 Matt Kemp; 9 Juan Pierre; 49 Delwyn Young | Manager: 9 Grady Little; Coaches: 37 Rich Donnelly (third base); 25,35 Mariano Duncan (1st base); 40 Rick Honeycutt (pitching); 46 Dave Jauss (bench); 11 Manny Mota; 3 Bill Mueller (hitting); 33 Eddie Murray (hitting); 48 Dan Warthen (bullpen) |

== Starting Pitchers stats ==
Note: G = Games pitched; GS = Games started; IP = Innings pitched; W/L = Wins/Losses; ERA = Earned run average; BB = Walks allowed; SO = Strikeouts; CG = Complete games

| Name | G | GS | IP | W/L | ERA | BB | SO | CG |
|---|---|---|---|---|---|---|---|---|
| Brad Penny | 33 | 33 | 208.0 | 16-4 | 3.03 | 73 | 135 | 0 |
| Derek Lowe | 33 | 33 | 199.1 | 12-14 | 3.88 | 59 | 147 | 3 |
| Chad Billingsley | 43 | 20 | 147.0 | 12-5 | 3.31 | 64 | 141 | 1 |
| Randy Wolf | 18 | 18 | 102.2 | 9-6 | 4.73 | 39 | 94 | 0 |
| David Wells | 7 | 7 | 38.2 | 4-1 | 5.12 | 9 | 19 | 0 |
| Hong-Chih Kuo | 8 | 6 | 30.1 | 1-4 | 7.42 | 15 | 27 | 0 |
| Jason Schmidt | 6 | 6 | 25.2 | 1-4 | 6.31 | 14 | 22 | 0 |
| Esteban Loaiza | 5 | 5 | 22.2 | 1-4 | 8.34 | 16 | 15 | 0 |

== Relief Pitchers stats ==
Note: G = Games pitched; GS = Games started; IP = Innings pitched; W/L = Wins/Losses; ERA = Earned run average; BB = Walks allowed; SO = Strikeouts; SV = Saves

| Name | G | GS | IP | W/L | ERA | BB | SO | SV |
|---|---|---|---|---|---|---|---|---|
| Takashi Saito | 63 | 0 | 64.1 | 2-1 | 1.40 | 13 | 78 | 39 |
| Joe Beimel | 83 | 0 | 67.1 | 4-2 | 3.88 | 24 | 39 | 1 |
| Jonathan Broxton | 83 | 0 | 82.0 | 4-4 | 2.85 | 25 | 99 | 2 |
| Rudy Seánez | 73 | 0 | 76.0 | 6-3 | 3.79 | 27 | 73 | 1 |
| Scott Proctor | 31 | 0 | 32.0 | 3-0 | 3.38 | 15 | 27 | 0 |
| Mark Hendrickson | 39 | 15 | 122.2 | 4-8 | 5.21 | 29 | 92 | 0 |
| Brett Tomko | 33 | 15 | 104.0 | 2-11 | 5.80 | 42 | 79 | 0 |
| Eric Stults | 12 | 5 | 38.2 | 1-4 | 5.82 | 17 | 30 | 0 |
| D.J. Houlton | 18 | 0 | 28.0 | 0-2 | 4.18 | 7 | 21 | 0 |
| Chin-hui Tsao | 21 | 0 | 24.2 | 0-1 | 4.38 | 8 | 16 | 0 |
| Roberto Hernández | 22 | 0 | 20.1 | 0-2 | 6.64 | 9 | 13 | 0 |
| Jonathan Meloan | 5 | 0 | 7.1 | 0-0 | 11.05 | 8 | 7 | 0 |
| Eric Hull | 5 | 0 | 6.2 | 0-0 | 4.05 | 3 | 5 | 0 |
| Yhency Brazobán | 4 | 0 | 1.2 | 0-0 | 16.20 | 3 | 5 | 0 |

== Batting Stats ==
Note: Pos = Position; G = Games played; AB = At bats; Avg. = Batting average; R = Runs scored; H = Hits; HR = Home runs; RBI = Runs batted in; SB = Stolen bases

| Name | Pos | G | AB | Avg. | R | H | HR | RBI | SB |
|---|---|---|---|---|---|---|---|---|---|
| Russell Martin | C | 151 | 540 | .293 | 87 | 158 | 19 | 87 | 21 |
| Mike Lieberthal | C | 38 | 77 | .234 | 6 | 18 | 0 | 1 | 0 |
| Chad Moeller | C | 7 | 8 | .125 | 2 | 1 | 0 | 0 | 0 |
| James Loney | 1B | 96 | 344 | .331 | 41 | 114 | 15 | 67 | 0 |
| Jeff Kent | 2B | 136 | 494 | .302 | 78 | 149 | 20 | 79 | 1 |
| Rafael Furcal | SS | 138 | 581 | .270 | 87 | 157 | 6 | 47 | 25 |
| Nomar Garciaparra | 3B/1B | 121 | 431 | .283 | 39 | 122 | 7 | 59 | 3 |
| Tony Abreu | 3B/2B/SS | 59 | 166 | .271 | 19 | 45 | 2 | 17 | 0 |
| Wilson Betemit | 3B/2B/SS/RF | 84 | 156 | .231 | 22 | 36 | 10 | 26 | 0 |
| Ramón Martínez | 2B/3B/SS/1B | 67 | 129 | .194 | 10 | 25 | 0 | 27 | 1 |
| Olmedo Sáenz | 1B/3B | 92 | 110 | .191 | 9 | 21 | 4 | 18 | 0 |
| Andy LaRoche | 3B/LF | 35 | 93 | .226 | 16 | 21 | 1 | 10 | 2 |
| Wilson Valdéz | SS/2B/3B/LF/CF | 41 | 74 | .216 | 12 | 16 | 0 | 7 | 1 |
| Shea Hillenbrand | 3B/1B | 20 | 70 | .243 | 6 | 17 | 1 | 9 | 0 |
| Mark Sweeney | 1B | 30 | 33 | .273 | 2 | 9 | 0 | 3 | 0 |
| Chin-Lung Hu | SS | 12 | 29 | .241 | 5 | 7 | 2 | 5 | 0 |
| Marlon Anderson | 1B/2B | 23 | 26 | .231 | 3 | 6 | 0 | 2 | 1 |
| Luis Gonzalez | LF | 139 | 464 | .278 | 70 | 129 | 15 | 68 | 6 |
| Juan Pierre | CF | 162 | 668 | .293 | 96 | 196 | 0 | 41 | 64 |
| Andre Ethier | RF/LF | 153 | 447 | .284 | 50 | 127 | 13 | 64 | 0 |
| Matt Kemp | RF/CF | 98 | 292 | .342 | 47 | 100 | 10 | 42 | 10 |
| Brady Clark | RF/LF/CF | 47 | 58 | .224 | 7 | 13 | 0 | 5 | 1 |
| Delwyn Young | LF/2B | 19 | 34 | .382 | 4 | 13 | 2 | 3 | 1 |

== 2007 Awards ==
- 2007 Major League Baseball All-Star Game
  - Russell Martin starter
  - Brad Penny reserve
  - Takashi Saito reserve
- 2007 Sporting News All-Star Team
  - Russell Martin
- Gold Glove Award
  - Russell Martin
- Silver Slugger Award
  - Russell Martin

== Farm system ==
| Level | Team | League | Manager |
|---|---|---|---|
| AAA | Las Vegas 51s | Pacific Coast League | Lorenzo Bundy |
| AA | Jacksonville Suns | Southern League | John Shoemaker |
| High A | Inland Empire 66ers of San Bernardino | California League | Dave Collins |
| A | Great Lakes Loons | Midwest League | Lance Parrish |
| Rookie | Ogden Raptors | Pioneer League | Jeff Carter |
| Rookie | Gulf Coast Dodgers | Gulf Coast League | Juan Bustabad |
| Rookie | DSL Dodgers | Dominican Summer League | |

== Miscellaneous ==
- During the 2007 season, the Dodgers added an infielder named Chin-lung Hu. After Hu singled in a game against the San Diego Padres, Dodgers announcer Vin Scully remarked "And Hu's on first." See Who's on First?#Real-life parallels.

== Major League Baseball draft ==
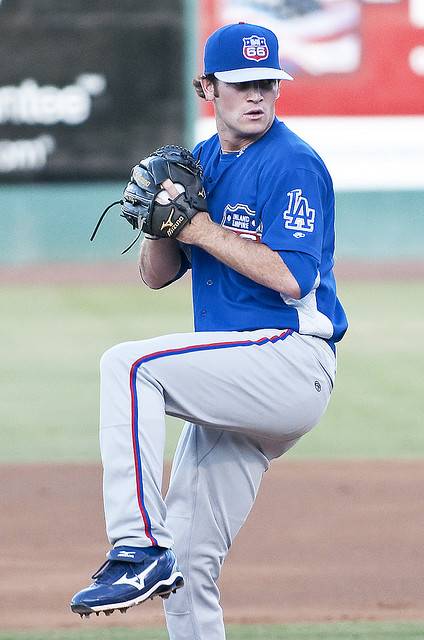
Chris Withrow

The Dodgers selected 40 players in this draft. Of those, five of them would eventually play Major League baseball. The Dodgers lost their own first round pick to the San Francisco Giants as a result of signing free agent pitcher Jason Schmidt but gained a first round pick as well as a supplemental first round pick because of the loss of free agent Julio Lugo.

The top draft pick was right-handed pitcher Chris Withrow from Midland High School in Midland, Texas. He made his Major League debut in 2013 with the Dodgers. He pitched in 46 games for them over parts of two seasons, with a 2.73 ERA before he was traded to the Atlanta Braves.

The supplemental pick was right-handed pitcher James Adkins from the University of Tennessee. He was a 1st team Freshman All-American at Tennessee in 2006 and was MVP of the Knoxville Regional at the College World Series. Adkins is Tennessee's all-time leader in strikeouts with 350 career strikeouts. He played for the Great Lakes Loons of the Midwest League in 2007, starting 11 games for the Loons and finishing with an 0-1 record and a 2.42 ERA in 26 innings of work during his first season of professional baseball. In 2008, he was 5-8 with a 5.34 ERA for Single-A Inland Empire 66ers of San Bernardino and 1-3 with a 4.74 ERA in 8 starts for the Double-A Jacksonville Suns. He started 26 games for the Chattanooga Lookouts in 2009, with a 6-10 record and 4.48 ERA. He was converted exclusively to a reliever in 2010, making 40 appearances for the Lookouts and 5 for the Triple-A Albuquerque Isotopes. He was released by the Dodgers on April 5, 2011. He signed with the Cincinnati Reds on May 4, but was released in August. After taking the 2012 season off, Adkins spent 2013 with the Grand Prairie AirHogs and Gary SouthShore RailCats, both part of the American Association of Independent Professional Baseball.

2007 draft picks

| Round | Name | Position | School | Signed | Career span | Highest level |
|---|---|---|---|---|---|---|
| 1 | Chris Withrow | RHP | Midland High School | Yes | 2007–2016 | MLB |
| 1s | James Adkins | LHP | University of Tennessee | Yes | 2007–2013 | AAA |
| 2 | Mike Watt | LHP | Capistrano Valley High School | Yes | 2007–2012 | AAA |
| 3 | Austin Gallagher | 3B | Manheim Township High School | Yes | 2007–2016 | A+ |
| 4 | Andrew Lambo | 1B | Newbury Park High School | Yes | 2007–2017 | MLB |
| 5 | Kyle Blair | RHP | Los Gatos High School | No; Indians-2011 | 2011–2014 | AA |
| 6 | Justin Miller | RHP | Johnson County Community College | Yes | 2007–2011 | AA |
| 7 | Danny Danielson | RHP | Russell County High School | Yes | 2007–2009 | Rookie |
| 8 | Alex Garabedian | C | College of Charleston | Yes | 2007–2012 | AA |
| 9 | Jaime Pedroza | SS | University of California, Riverside | Yes | 2007–2014 | AA |
| 10 | Erik Kanaby | OF | Lamar University | Yes | 2007–2009 | A |
| 11 | Paul Koss | RHP | University of Southern California | Yes | 2007–2012 | AA |
| 12 | Jessie Mier | C | Lewis–Clark State College | Yes | 2007–2012 | AA |
| 13 | Bobby Blevins | RHP | Le Moyne College | Yes | 2007–2017 | AAA |
| 14 | Devin Fuller | RHP | Gilbert High School | No; Rays-2009 | 2009–2010 | A- |
| 15 | Cal Stanke | RHP | University of Wisconsin–Oshkosh | Yes | 2007–2008 | A |
| 16 | Andrés Santiago | RHP | Colegio Carmen Sol | Yes | 2007–2022 | AAA |
| 17 | Chris Jacobs | 1B | Glenn High School | Yes | 2007–2019 | AA |
| 18 | Given Kutz | RHP | University of Portland | Yes | 2007–2008 | A+ |
| 19 | Joris Bert | OF | Frank Phillips College | Yes | 2007–2008 | Rookie |
| 20 | Sean Koecheler | RHP | Palm Beach Gardens High School | No | | |
| 21 | Terry Doyle | RHP | Boston College | No; White Sox-2008 | 2008–2016 | NPB |
| 22 | Matt Wallach | C | California State University, Fullerton | Yes | 2007–2013 | AAA |
| 23 | Nathan Carter | SS | De La Salle High School | No | | |
| 24 | Parker Dalton | SS | Texas A&M University | Yes | 2007–2009 | A |
| 25 | Tim Sexton | RHP | Miami Dade College | Yes | 2007–2016 | AAA |
| 26 | Taylor Cole | RHP | Bishop Gorman High School | No; Blue Jays-2011 | 2011–2019 | MLB |
| 27 | Rob Rasmussen | LHP | Poly High School | No; Marlins-2010 | 2010–2015 | MLB |
| 28 | Nathan Woods | OF | Xavier High School | No; Marlins-2011 | 2011 | A+ |
| 29 | Charles Keefer | 1B | North Central Texas College | No | | |
| 30 | Justin Coats | SS | Seminole State College | No | | |
| 31 | Rafael Thomas | OF | Lufkin High School | No | | |
| 32 | Matthew Gardner | RHP | Oklahoma State University | No | | |
| 33 | Jonathan Gonzalez | RHP | Cardinal Hayes High School | No | 2012–2013 | Ind |
| 34 | Garrett Poe | 1B | Silver City High School | No | | |
| 35 | Ryan Christenson | LHP | Arnett High School | No; Dodgers-2010 | 2010–2011 | A |
| 36 | Timothy Jones | RHP | Redan High School | No | | |
| 37 | Gabriel Casanova | 2B | Barry University | Yes | 2007–2008 | Rookie |
| 38 | Matt Szczur | C | Lower Cape May Regional High School | No; Cubs-2010 | 2010–2021 | MLB |
| 39 | John Hay | OF | College of the Canyons | No | | |
