= Nick Gorneault =

American baseball player (born 1979)

- Outfielder
- Born: April 19, 1979 (age 46); Springfield, Massachusetts, U.S.
- Batted: Right Threw: Right

MLB debut
- June 30, 2007, for the Los Angeles Angels of Anaheim

Last MLB appearance
- July 1, 2007, for the Los Angeles Angels of Anaheim

MLB statistics
- Batting average: .000
- Home runs: 0
- Runs: 1
- Stats at Baseball Reference

Teams
- Los Angeles Angels of Anaheim (2007)

Nicholas Anthony Gorneault (born April 19, 1979) is an American former Major League Baseball outfielder for the Los Angeles Angels of Anaheim organization. As of the 2015 season, he was an area scout for the Angels based in Springfield.

After being drafted by the Angels out of the University of Massachusetts Amherst, Gorneault spent several years in their minor league system before reaching the major leagues with the club in 2007. After a short stint in the Houston Astros organization, Gorneault signed a minor league contract with the Toronto Blue Jays.

== Early life ==
Gorneault was born to Gary and Darlene Gorneault on April 19, 1979, in Springfield, Massachusetts, and attended Cathedral High School in Springfield, where he starred in baseball and basketball. As a senior, he posted the strongest year of his high school career with 12 home runs, 41 runs batted in, and a .369 batting average. He was a member of the Western Massachusetts Championship basketball team, and was a first-team All-Western Massachusetts baseball star, receiving MVP honors for leading the team to a 1997 Western Massachusetts title.

Gorneault attended the University of Massachusetts Amherst, the same school attended by legendary California Angels' shortstop Gary DiSarcina, and went 2-6 in his first college start against Vermont. As a sophomore in 1999, Gorneault started in 17 of the team's 19 games, hit .333 in the Atlantic 10 Conference Tournament, including hitting the game-winning two-run double against Temple. In the Beanpot Tournament semifinals, Gorneault collected a career-high four hits and five runs batted in, including a walk-off two-run home run in the ninth inning to defeat Harvard.

In his junior year in 2000, Gorneault started 47 of the team's games, leading the team with 10 home runs, 42 runs batted in, and a .595 slugging percentage. In the season opener, Gorneault went 4-5 with three home runs against Florida. He also had the team's longest hitting streak of the season, recording a hit in 13 consecutive games, hitting .327 during the stretch.

== Professional career ==
Gorneault was drafted by the Los Angeles Angels of Anaheim in the 19th round of the 2001 Major League Baseball draft, and was signed to a minor league contract on June 7, 2001. In 2001, he played for the Provo Angels of the rookie Pioneer League. He hit .315, with 6 home runs and 30 runs batted in. However, in only 54 games, Gorneault led the team in strikeouts with 65. In 2002, Gorneault played 103 games for the Cedar Rapids Kernels of the Midwest League. He recorded a .289 batting average and a .465 slugging percentage, both which led the team. In 2003, he split his time with the Single-A Rancho Cucamonga Quakes and Double-A Arkansas Travelers. In total, he hit a career-high .326 in 126 games, with 16 home runs and 91 runs batted in. With the Quakes alone, he led the team with 72 runs batted in.

In 2004, Gorneault spent the bulk of the season with the Travelers. He led the team with 21 home runs, 81 runs batted in, 91 runs, and 128 strikeouts. His success earned him a spot with the Triple-A Salt Lake Stingers, now the Salt Lake Bees, at the end of the season. He hit .316 in only six games, with five runs batted in. In 2005, Gorneault finally had a full-time spot on the Triple-A roster. He led the Stingers in most offensive categories, including home runs, runs batted in, runs, hits, and slugging percentage.

In 2006, Gorneault struggled, hitting only .283 and leading the team in only one offensive category; he recorded a team-high 78 runs batted in. He hit 15 home runs in 107 games, second on the team. In 2007, Gorneault hit .261 with only 19 home runs and 59 runs batted in. Midseason, due to a minor injury to Reggie Willits, Gorneault finally got the call to the major leagues. He made his debut on June 30, 2007, going 0-2 with a walk, in a 6-3 loss to the Baltimore Orioles. After a second 0-2 performance the following day, he was sent back down to Salt Lake, where he would finish his season.

Following the season, on October 29, 2007, he was claimed off waivers by the Texas Rangers. Gorneault was not offered a new contract and was non-tendered on December 12, 2007.

On January 17, 2008, Gorneault signed a minor league contract with an invitation to spring training with the Houston Astros. He became a free agent at the end of the season and signed a minor league contract with the Toronto Blue Jays in February 2009.

On August 8, 2009, Gorneault recorded his 1,000th minor league hit in a game against the Altoona Curve at Merchantsauto.com Stadium in Manchester, New Hampshire. At the time, Gorneault was playing for the Blue Jays double-A affiliate, the New Hampshire Fisher Cats. The hit was recorded off of Curve pitcher Daniel Moskos.

On December 22, 2009, Gorneault signed a minor league contract with the Los Angeles Angels.
