= Terry Evans (baseball) =

American baseball player

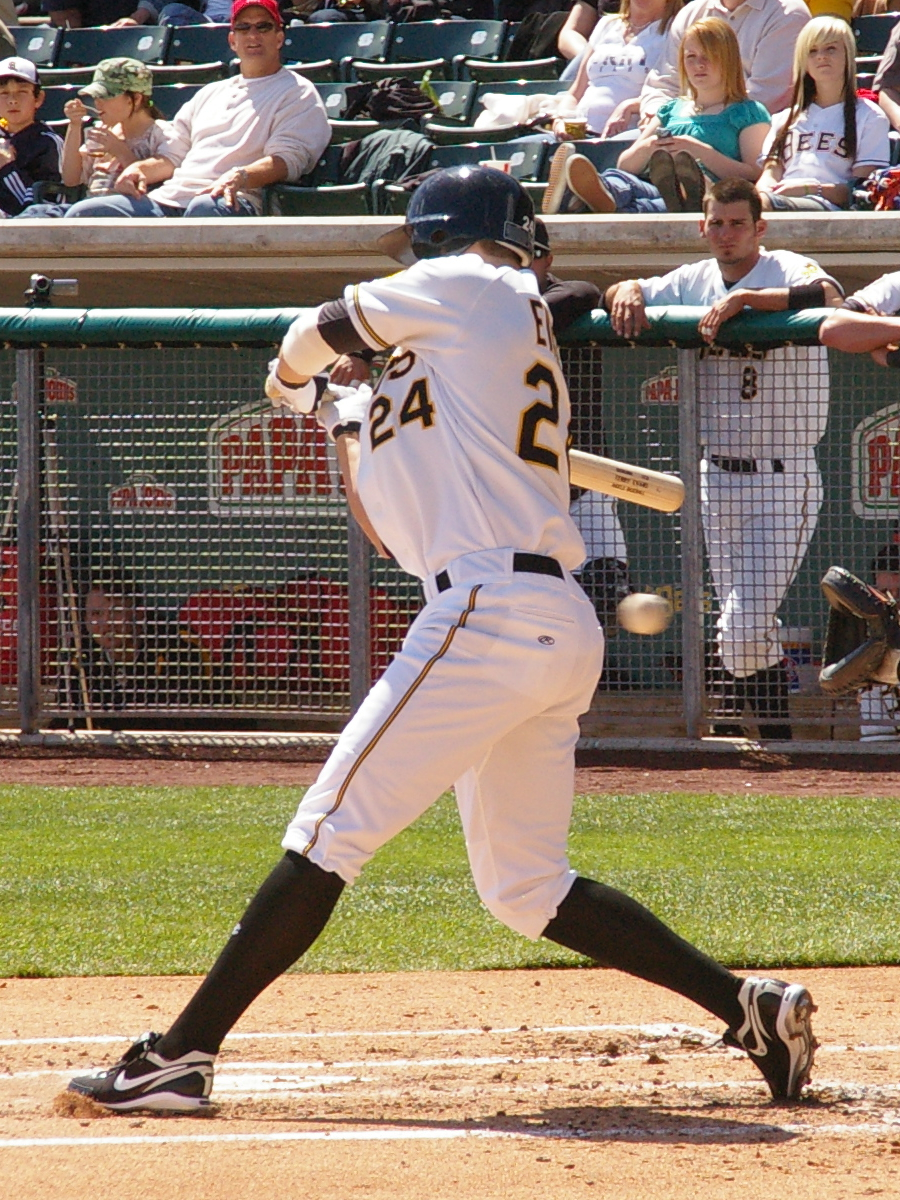
- Evans batting for the Salt Lake Bees, Triple-A affiliates of the Los Angeles Angels of Anaheim, on April 12, 2009
- Outfielder
- Born: January 19, 1982 (age 44); Dublin, Georgia
- Batted: Right Threw: Right

MLB debut
- June 17, 2007, for the Los Angeles Angels of Anaheim

Last appearance
- April 9, 2010, for the Los Angeles Angels of Anaheim

MLB statistics
- Batting average: .158
- Home runs: 1
- Runs batted in: 3
- Stats at Baseball Reference

Teams
- Los Angeles Angels of Anaheim (2007, 2009–2010)

Michael Terry Evans (born January 19, 1982) is an American former professional baseball outfielder.

Evans was traded from the St. Louis Cardinals to the Los Angeles Angels of Anaheim in return for pitcher Jeff Weaver on July 5, 2006.

He debuted on June 17, 2007, striking out in a pinch-hit appearance against the Los Angeles Dodgers. On June 20, he made his first career start in right field in his first home game. It was Father's Day, and his father was in attendance. He later hit his first home run in his first plate appearance at home on a 3–1 count.

He is married to the former Tanner Cochran of Dublin, Georgia. They have one child.

Although he began the 2010 season with the major league club, Evans was designated for assignment early on and sent outright to the minors on April 14.

After signing a minor league contract with the San Francisco Giants in 2010, he was released on June 1, 2011. He signed a minor league contract with the Philadelphia Phillies later that day and was assigned to the Double-A Reading Phillies.
