= Chris Bootcheck =

American baseball player (born 1978)

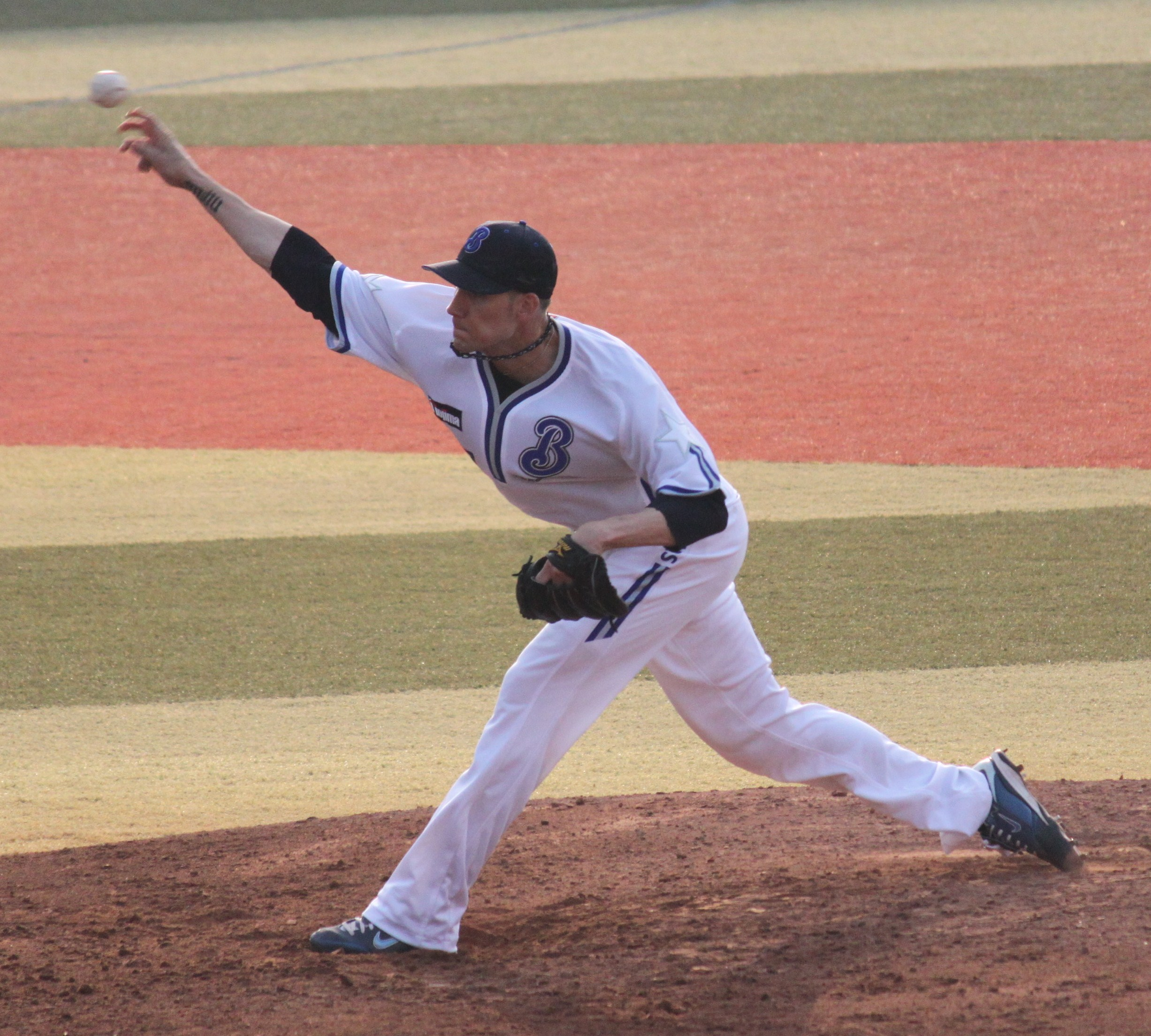
- Bootcheck with the Yokohama BayStars in 2010
- Pitcher
- Born: October 24, 1978 (age 47); La Porte, Indiana, U.S.
- Batted: Right Threw: Right

Professional debut
- MLB: September 9, 2003, for the Anaheim Angels
- NPB: May 5, 2010, for the Yokohama BayStars
- KBO: July 15, 2011, for the Lotte Giants

Last appearance
- NPB: July 16, 2010, for the Yokohama BayStars
- KBO: October 5, 2011, for the Lotte Giants
- MLB: June 14, 2013, for the New York Yankees

MLB statistics
- Win–loss record: 3–7
- Earned run average: 6.55
- Strikeouts: 106

NPB statistics
- Win–loss record: 1–0
- Earned run average: 4.62
- Strikeouts: 25

KBO statistics
- Win–loss record: 4–2
- Earned run average: 5.06
- Strikeouts: 39
- Stats at Baseball Reference

Teams
- Anaheim / Los Angeles Angels of Anaheim (2003, 2005–2008); Pittsburgh Pirates (2009); Yokohama BayStars (2010); Lotte Giants (2011); New York Yankees (2013)

Christopher Brandon Bootcheck (born October 24, 1978) is an American former professional baseball pitcher. He played in Major League Baseball (MLB) for the Anaheim / Los Angeles Angels of Anaheim, Pittsburgh Pirates, and New York Yankees, in Nippon Professional Baseball (NPB) for the Yokohama BayStars, and in the KBO League for the Lotte Giants.

== Playing career ==
=== College ===
Bootcheck played collegiately for the Auburn Tigers of the Southeastern Conference. He attended Michigan City (Rogers) High School for two years and La Porte High School for two years. He made his major league debut with the Anaheim Angels on September 9, 2003.

=== Anaheim/Los Angeles Angels ===
On May 2, 2006, Bootcheck was hurt while running from the bullpen to the mound during the Angels' brawl with the Oakland Athletics. He was placed on the disabled list with a hamstring injury and missed most of the season.

=== Pittsburgh Pirates ===
He became a free agent after the 2008 season and signed a minor league contract with the Pittsburgh Pirates.

=== Yokohama Bay Stars ===
In 2010, he played for the Yokohama Bay Stars of Nippon Professional Baseball.

=== Tampa Bay Rays ===
In 2011, he returned to Major League Baseball, signing a minor league contract with the Tampa Bay Rays. On July 2, he was granted his release by Tampa Bay. He later played for the Lotte Giants in South Korea.

=== Detroit Tigers ===
On December 11, 2011, he signed a minor league contract with the Detroit Tigers.

=== New York Yankees ===
Bootcheck signed a minor league contract with the New York Yankees for the 2013 season. The Yankees called him up to the major leagues on June 14. He was designated for assignment on June 18, 2013. Bootcheck opted to become a free agent, but re-signed with the Yankees shortly after. The new contract includes an August 15 opt-out date.

=== Philadelphia Phillies ===
Bootcheck signed a minor league deal with the Philadelphia Phillies in December 2013. He became a free agent after the 2014 season.
