= Jeff Weaver =

American baseball player (born 1976)

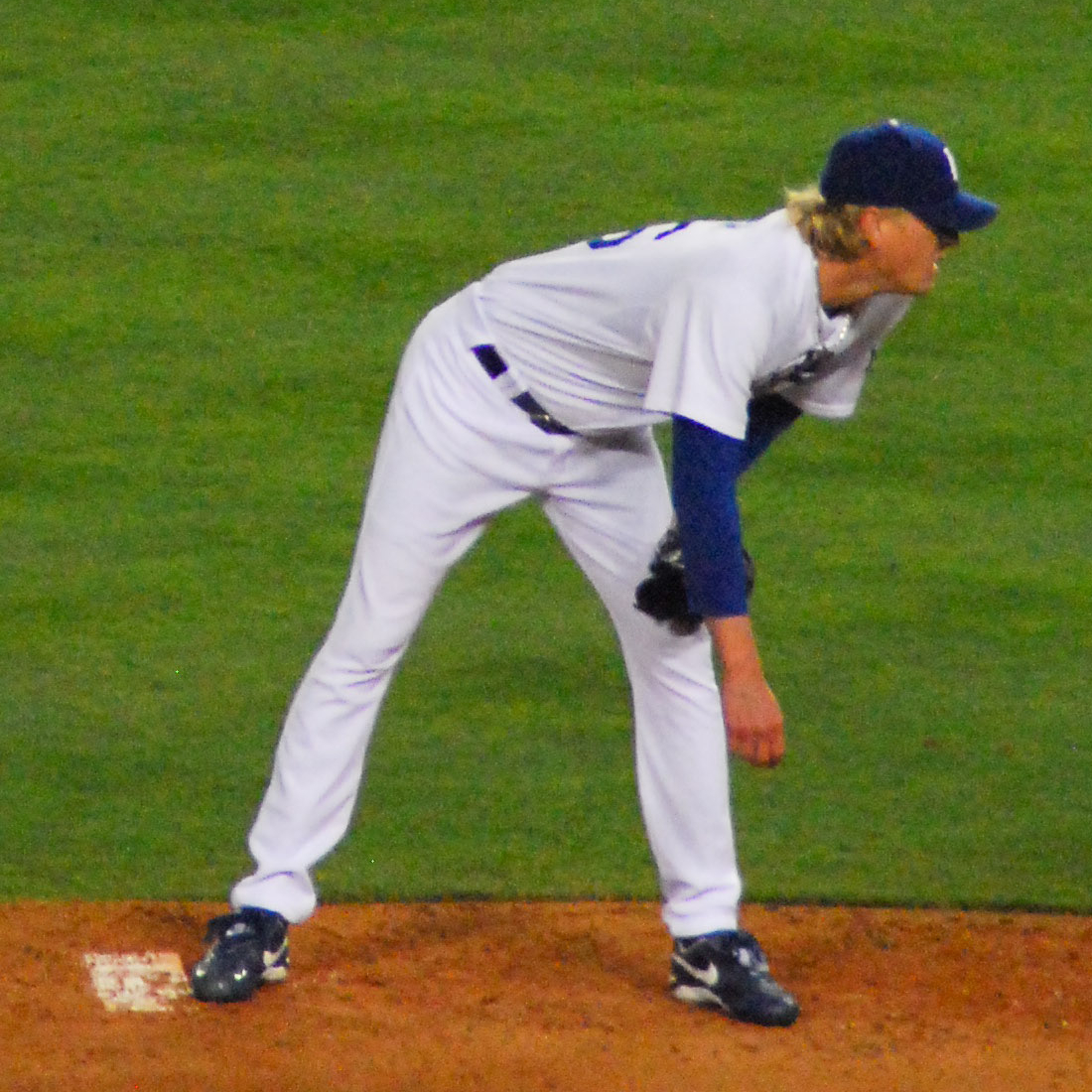
- Weaver with the Los Angeles Dodgers
- Pitcher
- Born: August 22, 1976 (age 49); Northridge, California, U.S.
- Batted: Right Threw: Right

MLB debut
- April 14, 1999, for the Detroit Tigers

Last MLB appearance
- September 29, 2010, for the Los Angeles Dodgers

MLB statistics
- Win–loss record: 104–119
- Earned run average: 4.71
- Strikeouts: 1,214
- Stats at Baseball Reference

Teams
- Detroit Tigers (1999–2002); New York Yankees (2002–2003); Los Angeles Dodgers (2004–2005); Los Angeles Angels of Anaheim (2006); St. Louis Cardinals (2006); Seattle Mariners (2007); Los Angeles Dodgers (2009–2010)

Career highlights and awards
- World Series champion (2006)
Medals
Men's baseball
Representing United States
Olympic Games
Bronze medal – third place	1996 Atlanta	Team

Jeffrey Charles Weaver (born August 22, 1976) is an American former right-handed Major League Baseball pitcher. During his career, he pitched for the Detroit Tigers, New York Yankees, Los Angeles Dodgers, Los Angeles Angels of Anaheim, St. Louis Cardinals, and Seattle Mariners. He is the older brother of fellow MLB pitcher Jered Weaver.

== Amateur career ==
Weaver, a graduate of Simi Valley High School in Simi Valley, California, attended California State University, Fresno to play college baseball for the Fresno State Bulldogs. In summer 1995, Weaver played for the Dubuque Mud Puppies of the Northwoods League, eventually becoming the first ever Northwoods League player to appear in Major League Baseball. In 1997, he played collegiate summer baseball with the Falmouth Commodores of the Cape Cod Baseball League where he was named a league all-star. He also played for the United States in the 1996 Summer Olympics, winning a bronze medal.

== Professional career ==
=== Detroit Tigers ===
The Detroit Tigers selected Weaver in the first round of the 1998 Major League Baseball draft. He made his major league debut a year later. He was the Tigers' Opening Day starter in 2001 and 2002. During the 2002 season, he was traded to the New York Yankees in a three team deal that also involved the Oakland Athletics and Yankees prospects John-Ford Griffin, Jason Arnold, and Ted Lilly.

=== New York Yankees ===
Weaver's time with the Yankees was very turbulent, bouncing in and out of the starting rotation. In Game 4 of the 2003 World Series, he allowed a 12th inning walk-off home run to Álex González.

=== Los Angeles Dodgers ===
Following the 2003 season, the Yankees traded Weaver to the Los Angeles Dodgers for Kevin Brown.

In 2005, he went 14-11, with a 4.22 ERA, a 1.17 WHIP, three complete games and a career-high 157 strikeouts in 224 innings. Following the 2005 season, Weaver filed for free agency. The Dodgers offered him salary arbitration, but the two parties were unable to reach an agreement.

=== Los Angeles Angels of Anaheim ===
On February 15, 2006, Weaver signed a one-year deal with the Angels for $8.5 million. After posting a 3-10 record with a 6.29 ERA in Anaheim, he was designated for assignment on June 30. In a bit of a coincidence, his younger brother, Jered, was recalled from the minor leagues and replaced Jeff in the starting rotation.

=== St. Louis Cardinals ===
On July 5, 2006, the St. Louis Cardinals acquired Weaver from the Angels in exchange for minor leaguer Terry Evans and cash considerations. He debuted with the team as a pinch hitter in a 14-inning game between the Cardinals and Dodgers on July 13, 2006, at Busch Stadium.

Jered and Jeff both appeared in the September 11, 2006, issue of Sports Illustrated that chronicled how Jeff Weaver's trade impacted Jeff and Jered both baseball-wise and in life away from the game. The younger Weaver was disappointed that his brother left without being around to see him make history by winning his first nine career decisions.

After yielding six runs in four innings in his first start, Weaver played a key role in the Cardinals' World Series win. He won important games for the Cardinals in the final weeks of the season, helping them win the National League Central Division, and he started and won Game 2 of the 2006 National League Division Series. Weaver started and was the losing pitcher for Game 1 of the National League Championship Series against the New York Mets on October 12, 2006. He pitched five scoreless innings before giving up a two-run home run to Mets center fielder Carlos Beltrán in the sixth inning; as the Cards lost 2-0.

In Game 5 of the National League Championship Series on October 17, 2006, Weaver pitched six innings, allowing two runs on six hits, winning his second game of the 2006 postseason.

After losing Game 2 of the 2006 World Series to the Detroit Tigers, Weaver came back on October 27 in Game 5 to pitch eight innings, giving up four hits and one earned run. He was credited with the win as the Cardinals clinched the series 4-1.

=== Seattle Mariners ===
On January 26, 2007, the Seattle Mariners signed Weaver as a free agent to a one-year deal worth $8–9 million. Weaver had a 14.32 ERA with only 22 innings pitched after six starts and was placed on the 15-day disabled list with "right shoulder tendinitis". It was speculated that this was a strategic move by the team to allow Weaver to take some time off and make a series of "rehab" starts with a minor league affiliate. The hope was that he would be able to work out his problems without adversely impacting the Major League ball club; it seemed to work as Weaver pitched more effectively after his return. On June 20 versus the Pittsburgh Pirates, Weaver posted a four-hit, 7–0 shutout, which was his first win with Seattle. Although he pitched well in July and August, Weaver finished with a 7–13 record and 6.20 ERA and became a free agent after the season.

=== Back in the minors ===
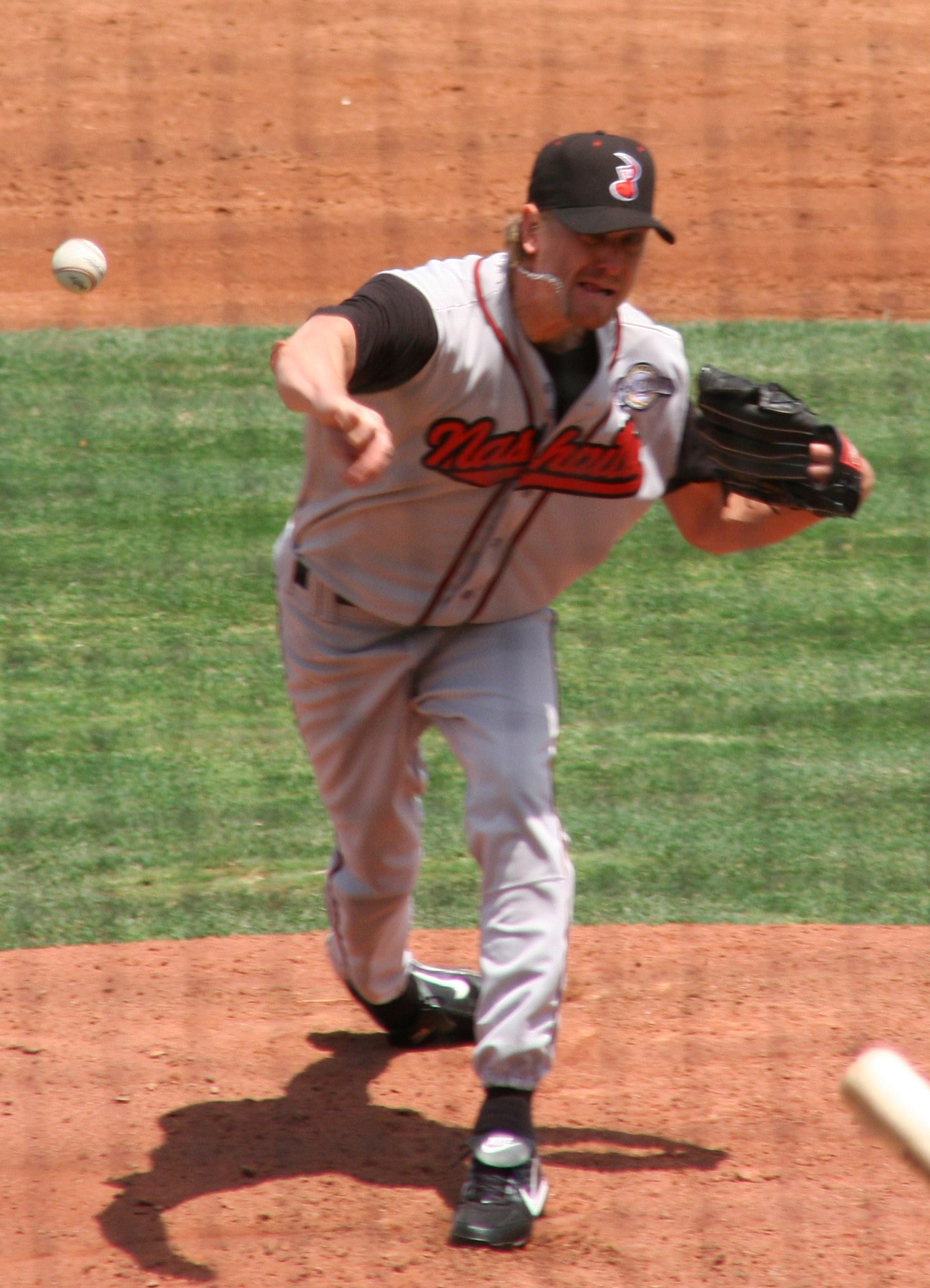
Weaver pitching for the Nashville Sounds, Triple-A affiliates of the Milwaukee Brewers, in 2008.

On April 15, 2008, Weaver signed a minor league deal with the Milwaukee Brewers. However, after pitching in just nine minor league games, Weaver requested and was granted a release from his contract. On July 5, Weaver signed a minor league contract with the Cleveland Indians, but did not appear in the majors with them, spending the rest of the season in AAA with the Buffalo Bisons.

=== Return to the Dodgers ===
Weaver signed a minor-league deal with the Los Angeles Dodgers in February 2009 and was assigned to the AAA Albuquerque Isotopes. After a few appearances with the Isotopes, Weaver was recalled to the Dodgers on April 30 and he pitched four scoreless innings of relief against the San Diego Padres, his first appearance in a Major League game since 2007. He made his first start of 2009 vs. the Arizona Diamondbacks on May 5 and allowed one run and struck out six in five innings.

On June 20, 2009, Jeff Weaver started for the Dodgers against the Los Angeles Angels. The opposing starter was his younger brother Jered Weaver. This was the first pitching matchup between brothers since 2002 when Andy and Alan Benes matched up and only the 15th such game since 1967. The Dodgers won 6-4, with Jeff getting the win and Jered taking the loss.

On October 7, 2009, Weaver was the winning pitcher in Game One of the 2009 National League Division Series between the Dodgers and his former team, the St. Louis Cardinals. It was the fourth post-season victory of his career. Weaver returned to the Dodgers for the 2010 season on another minor league contract. He once more made the opening day roster as a reliever.

On May 7, 2010, Weaver picked up his 100th career victory in a relief outing against the Colorado Rockies. He appeared in 43 games with the Dodgers in 2010, all in relief, and finished 5-1 with a 6.09 ERA. He became a free agent following the season.

== Post-baseball career ==
=== Oaks Christian School ===
On September 28, 2016, Weaver was hired as the pitching coach for the Oaks Christian School varsity baseball team to work alongside head coach Royce Clayton.

== See also ==
- List of Major League Baseball career hit batsmen leaders
