= Eric Hull =

American baseball player (born 1979)

- Pitcher
- Born: December 3, 1979 (age 46); Yakima, Washington, U.S.
- Batted: Right Threw: Right

MLB debut
- July 24, 2007, for the Los Angeles Dodgers

Last MLB appearance
- September 16, 2007, for the Los Angeles Dodgers

MLB statistics
- Win–loss record: 0–0
- Earned run average: 4.05
- Strikeouts: 5
- Stats at Baseball Reference

Teams
- Los Angeles Dodgers (2007)

Eric Eugene Hull (born December 3, 1979) is an American former Major League Baseball pitcher.

After attending Selah High School and Buena Tech, Hull attended the University of Portland. As a senior in 2002, he earned All-West Coast Conference second-team honors for the second straight season after leading the league with eight saves. He posted a 2–3 record in 2002 with a 3.64 ERA and 61 strikeouts in 59.1 innings.

== Professional career ==
Hull signed with the Los Angeles Dodgers as an undrafted free agent on June 18, 2002. After a brief stint in the Pioneer League, Hull pitched for the Vero Beach Dodgers in 2003 and 2004 before being promoted to the Jacksonville Suns during the 2004 season. In 2003, at Vero Beach he went 3–5 with a 2.68 ERA in 31 appearances (14 starts).

He was promoted to the Las Vegas 51s, the Dodgers' Triple-A team, during the 2005 season and pitched primarily in the 51s bullpen for the next two seasons.

He was briefly promoted to the Major League team in May 2007, but was returned to the 51s a few days later without appearing in a single game.

He made his MLB debut on July 24, 2007, against the Houston Astros, working two scoreless innings in relief.

On April 7, 2008, he was traded by the Dodgers to the Boston Red Sox for infielder Christian Lara. He was then optioned to the Triple-A Pawtucket Red Sox. The Red Sox designated him for assignment on August 30. He became a free agent at the end of the season and signed a minor league contract with the Seattle Mariners in December. After pitching in their minor league system in 2009, he again became a free agent after the season and was not signed by any other teams.
