= Ryan Budde =

American baseball player (born 1979)

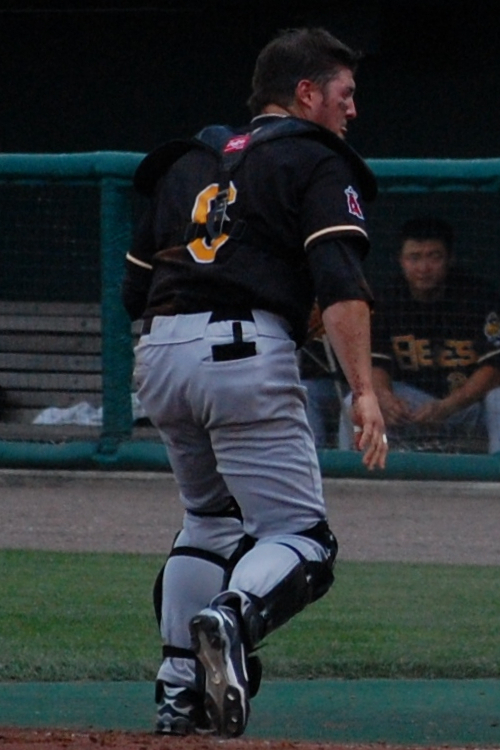
- Budde playing for the Salt Lake Bees, triple-A affiliates of the Los Angeles Angels of Anaheim, in 2010
- Catcher
- Born: August 15, 1979 (age 46); Midwest City, Oklahoma, U.S.
- Batted: Right Threw: Right

MLB debut
- July 31, 2007, for the Los Angeles Angels of Anaheim

Last MLB appearance
- May 12, 2010, for the Los Angeles Angels of Anaheim

MLB statistics (through 2011 season)
- Batting average: .212
- Home runs: 1
- Runs batted in: 4
- Stats at Baseball Reference

Teams
- Los Angeles Angels of Anaheim (2007–2010)

Ryan Dean Budde (born August 15, 1979) is an American former Major League Baseball (MLB) catcher who played for the Los Angeles Angels of Anaheim from 2007 to 2010.

== High school and college ==
Budde graduated from Midwest City High School in Oklahoma and entered the 1998 Major League Baseball draft. He was selected by the New York Mets in the 12th round (364th overall). Budde did not sign with the Mets and instead opted to attend college. Budde attended Oklahoma State University and there he played baseball. In 1999, he played collegiate summer baseball with the Orleans Cardinals of the Cape Cod Baseball League. He was selected by the Anaheim Angels in the 12th round (359th overall) of the 2001 Major League Baseball draft.

== Professional career ==
=== Anaheim Angels/Los Angeles Angels of Anaheim ===
Budde officially signed with the Anaheim Angels on July 10, 2001, but did not play in 2001 due to an injury. Budde began his professional career in 2002, playing for the High-A Rancho Cucamonga Quakes and the Double-A Arkansas Travelers. He played in a total of 90 games and batted .237 with 6 home runs. Budde played for the Quakes and the Travelers again in 2003. Budde played in a total of 110 games and batted .217 with 11 home runs.

In 2004, Budde mainly played for the Quakes, but also played 5 games for the Triple-A Salt Lake Stingers. In 99 games with the Quakes, he batted .251 with 13 home runs.

Budde spent the 2005 and 2006 seasons with Salt Lake, mainly serving as Jeff Mathis' backup in both seasons. He batted .230 with 6 home runs in 2005 and did not do much better in 2006 when he batted .233 with 8 home runs.

=== Philadelphia Phillies ===
On December 7, 2006, Budde was selected by the Philadelphia Phillies in the major league phase of the Rule 5 Draft. Budde was placed on the 15-day disabled list with a strained left oblique on March 30, 2007. In the Phillies organization, Budde played 3 games, all of which were rehab assignment games. On April 23, 2007, Budde was activated from the disabled list, but with Rod Barajas and Carlos Ruiz on the active roster, Budde was offered back to the Angels.

=== Los Angeles Angels of Anaheim ===
Upon receiving him back, the Angels assigned Budde to Triple-A to play with the Salt Lake Bees. He ended up playing in 47 games for the Bees in 2007 and batted .295 with 4 home runs.

On July 28, 2007, Budde's contract was purchased to give the Angels a second catcher after Mike Napoli was placed on the disabled list. Budde made his major league debut on July 31, 2007. Facing the Seattle Mariners that day, he came into the game as a pinch hitter. For the next month, Budde was the backup catcher to Jeff Mathis until Napoli came back on September 1 and Budde became the third catcher and after that he only played one more game in the season. On August 20, 2007, Budde recorded his first major league RBI, which was against the New York Yankees. He had come into the game as a defensive replacement and in the 10th inning, he ended the game when he hit the game winning double off Sean Henn. Budde finished the 2007 season with a .167 batting average with no home runs and 1 RBI in 12 games.

Since 2008 Budde has mostly played for Salt Lake, with a few appearances for the Angels in each of the 2008 through 2010 seasons.

=== Toronto Blue Jays ===
On December 21, 2010, the Toronto Blue Jays signed Budde to a minor league contract with an invitation to spring training. He became a free agent at the end of the 2011 season.

=== Arizona Diamondbacks ===
Budde signed a minor league contract with the Arizona Diamondbacks on November 15, 2011.
