= Marcus Gwyn =

American baseball player (born 1977)

- Relief pitcher
- Born: November 4, 1977 (age 47); Tulsa, Oklahoma
- Batted: Right Threw: Right

Professional debut
- MLB: July 29, 2007, for the Los Angeles Angels of Anaheim
- NPB: August 10, 2008, for the Tohoku Rakuten Golden Eagles

Last appearance
- MLB: September 26, 2007, for the Los Angeles Angels of Anaheim
- NPB: September 18, 2009, for the Tohoku Rakuten Golden Eagles

MLB statistics
- Win–loss record: 0–0
- Earned run average: 11.81
- Strikeouts: 3

NPB statistics
- Win–loss record: 4–5
- Earned run average: 3.65
- Strikeouts: 60
- Stats at Baseball Reference

Teams
- Los Angeles Angels of Anaheim (2007); Tohoku Rakuten Golden Eagles (2008–2009)

Marcus Edwin Gwyn (born November 4, 1977) is an American former professional baseball relief pitcher.

== Career ==
After being drafted by the Oakland Athletics in the 2000 Major League Baseball draft, Gwyn made his major league debut on July 29, 2007, for the Los Angeles Angels of Anaheim. On January 4, 2008, he signed a minor league deal with the Florida Marlins, but was released on July 25, 2008, after spending the entire year with Triple-A Albuquerque. On July 29, he signed a contract with the Tohoku Rakuten Golden Eagles of Nippon Professional Baseball.
