= 2007 Chicago White Sox season =

2007 Chicago White Sox
- League: American League
- Division: Central
- Ballpark: U.S. Cellular Field
- City: Chicago
- Record: 72–90 (.444)
- Divisional place: 4th
- Owners: Jerry Reinsdorf
- General managers: Kenny Williams
- Managers: Ozzie Guillén
- Television: CSN Chicago; WGN-TV and Superstation WGN; WCIU-TV (Ken Harrelson, Darrin Jackson)
- Radio: WSCR (Ed Farmer, Chris Singleton); WRTO (Spanish)

The Chicago White Sox' 2007 season started off with the White Sox trying to re-claim the American League Central title, an achievement they last achieved in 2005, when they went on to win the 2005 World Series. They failed to win consecutive AL Central championships when the Minnesota Twins won it in 2006. They finished the season 72–90, fourth place in the AL Central. Notable events include Mark Buehrle pitching a no-hitter on April 18, 2007.

On August 12, 2007, closer Bobby Jenks retired his 41st consecutive hitter, Yuniesky Betancourt, to tie the Major League record for most consecutive hitter retired in a row. He is tied with Jim Barr, who set it with the San Francisco Giants over two games on August 23, 1972, and August 29, 1972.

On September 16, 2007 Jim Thome hit his 500th career home run with a two-run shot in the bottom of the 9th inning to beat the Los Angeles Angels of Anaheim 9–7. Thome is the first player in club history to hit his 500th career home run while in a White Sox uniform.

With their 72–90 record, the White Sox finished with their first losing season since 1999.

== 2007 off-season ==
The 2006–2007 offseason stirred up controversy among Sox fans. First, on November 16, lefty reliever Neal Cotts was sent to the Chicago Cubs for reliever David Aardsma and prospect Carlos Vásquez. This was the first deal between the crosstown rivals since the Cubs traded pitcher Jon Garland for White Sox reliever Matt Karchner in the middle of the 1998 season.

A deal that involved trading Garland to the Houston Astros for outfielder Willy Taveras and pitchers Taylor Buchholz and Jason Hirsh was reported to have been agreed upon, but general manager Ken Williams backed out of the trade at the last minute, due to health concerns for Buchholz.

Williams traded first baseman Ross Gload to the Kansas City Royals for reliever Andrew Sisco.

On December 6, starting pitcher Freddy García was traded to the Philadelphia Phillies for pitching prospects Gavin Floyd and Gio González, who was initially traded to the Phillies by the White Sox in the Jim Thome deal a year prior.

Even more controversial was the December 23 deal that sent highly touted starter Brandon McCarthy, along with outfield prospect David Paisano, to the Texas Rangers for pitching prospects John Danks, Nick Masset, and Jacob Rasner. To some, it seemed as if Williams was sacrificing the present for the future in these deals.

The Sox also signed free agent catcher Toby Hall, signed free agent outfielder/first baseman Darin Erstad, and signed Javier Vázquez to a 3-year, $33 million contract extension.

== Regular season ==
=== Season standings ===
AL Central
Team	W	L	Pct.	GB	Home	Road
Cleveland Indians	96	66	.593	—	51‍–‍29	45‍–‍37
Detroit Tigers	88	74	.543	8	45‍–‍36	43‍–‍38
Minnesota Twins	79	83	.488	17	41‍–‍40	38‍–‍43
Chicago White Sox	72	90	.444	24	38‍–‍43	34‍–‍47
Kansas City Royals	69	93	.426	27	35‍–‍46	34‍–‍47

=== Record vs. opponents ===
2007 American League record Source: MLB Standings Grid – 2007
Team	BAL	BOS	CWS	CLE	DET	KC	LAA	MIN	NYY	OAK	SEA	TB	TEX	TOR	NL
Baltimore	—	6–12	5–3	3–4	1–5	7–0	3–7	0–7	9–9	4–4	2–7	11–7	4–6	8–10	6–12
Boston	12–6	—	7–1	5–2	3–4	3–3	6–4	4–3	8–10	4–4	4–5	13–5	6–4	9–9	12–6
Chicago	3–5	1–7	—	7–11	11–7	12–6	5–4	9–9	4–6	4–5	1–7	6–1	2–4	3–4	4–14
Cleveland	4–3	2–5	11–7	—	12–6	11–7	5–5	14–4	0–6	6–4	4–3	8–2	6–3	4–2	9–9
Detroit	5–1	4–3	7–11	6–12	—	11–7	3–5	12–6	4–4	4–6	6–4	3–4	5–4	4–3	14–4
Kansas City	0–7	3–3	6–12	7–11	7–11	—	5–2	9–9	1–9	6–4	3–6	4–3	5–4	3–4	10–8
Los Angeles	7–3	4–6	4–5	5–5	5–3	2–5	—	6–3	6–3	9–10	13–6	6–2	10–9	3–4	14–4
Minnesota	7–0	3–4	9–9	4–14	6–12	9–9	3–6	—	2–5	5–2	6–3	3–4	7–2	4–6	11–7
New York	9–9	10–8	6–4	6–0	4–4	9–1	3–6	5–2	—	2–4	5–5	10–8	5–1	10–8	10–8
Oakland	4–4	4–4	5–4	4–6	6–4	4–6	10–9	2–5	4–2	—	5–14	4–6	9–10	5–4	10–8
Seattle	7–2	5–4	7–1	3–4	4–6	6–3	6–13	3–6	5–5	14–5	—	4–3	11–8	4–5	9–9
Tampa Bay	7–11	5–13	1–6	2–8	4–3	3–4	2–6	4–3	8–10	6–4	3–4	—	5–4	9–9	7–11
Texas	6–4	4–6	4–2	3–6	4–5	4–5	9–10	2–7	1–5	10–9	8–11	4–5	—	5–5	11–7
Toronto	10–8	9–9	4–3	2–4	3–4	4–3	4–3	6–4	8–10	4–5	5–4	9–9	5–5	—	10–8

== Game log ==
2007 White Sox game log
April (12–11) – Home (5–7) – Road (7–4)

#	Date	Time	Opponent	Score	Win	Loss	Save	Attendance	Record	Box
1	April 2	Indians	5–12	Sabathia (1–0)	Contreras (0–1)		2:51	38,088	0–1	box
2	April 4	Indians	7–8	Fultz (1–0)	Thornton (0–1)	Borowski (1)	3:29	26,337	0–2	box
3	April 5	Indians	4–3	Jenks (1–0)	Hernández (0–1)		2:54	24,141	1–2	box
–	April 6	Twins	Postponed (cold weather), Rescheduled for July 6							
4	April 7	Twins	3–0	Vázquez (1–0)	Silva (0–1)	Jenks (1)	2:51	33,278	2–2	box
5	April 8	Twins	1–3	Santana (2–0)	Danks (0–1)	Nathan (3)	2:36	27,653	2–3	box
6	April 9	@ Athletics	4–1	Contreras (1–1)	Harden (1–1)		2:38	35,077	3–3	box
7	April 10	@ Athletics	1–2	Street (1–0)	Jenks (1–1)		2:37	15,153	3–4	box
8	April 11	@ Athletics	6–3	Aardsma (1–0)	Street (1–1)	Jenks (2)	2:32	19,130	4–4	box
9	April 13	@ Indians	6–4	Vázquez (2–0)	Carmona (0–1)	Jenks (3)	3:17	16,789	5–4	box
10	April 14	@ Indians	0–4	Byrd (1–0)	Danks (0–2)	Borowski (4)	2:50	18,082	5–5	box
11	April 15	@ Indians	1–2	Sabathia (3–0)	Contreras (1–2)	Borowski (5)	2:34	14,887	5–6	box
12	April 17	Rangers	1–8	Tejeda (2–1)	Garland (0–1)		2:28	23,139	5–7	box
13	April 18	Rangers	6–0	Buehrle (1–0)	Millwood (2–2)		2:03	25,390	6–7	box
14	April 19	Rangers	6–4	Thornton (1–1)	Feldman (1–1)	Jenks (4)	2:42	25,459	7–7	box
15	April 20	@ Tigers	5–4	Masset (1–0)	Grilli (0–1)	Jenks (5)	2:59	40,685	8–7	box
16	April 21	@ Tigers	7 – 5 (10)	Aardsma (2–0)	Rodney (1–2)	Jenks (6)	3:09	39,618	9–7	box
17	April 22	@ Tigers	5 – 6 (12)	Grilli (1–1)	Masset (1–1)		3:27	38,379	9–8	box
18	April 23	@ Royals	7–4	Buehrle (2–0)	Gobble (0–1)	Jenks (7)	2:58	12,265	10–8	box
19	April 24	@ Royals	9–7	Logan (1–0)	Soria (1–1)	Jenks (8)	3:27	14,907	11–8	box
20	April 25	Tigers	2–6	Durbin (1–1)	Danks (0–3)	Jones (8)	2:41	26,342	11–9	box
–	April 26	Tigers	Postponed (rain), rescheduled for July 24							
21	April 27	Angels	7–3	Contreras (2–2)	Santana (2–3)		2:54	30,193	12–9	box
22	April 28	Angels	0–3	Weaver (1–2)	Garland (0–2)	Rodríguez (7)	2:39	38,208	12–10	box
23	April 29	Angels	2–5	Escobar (1–0)	Buehrle (2–1)	Rodríguez (8)	2:30	38,513	12–11	box

May (12–14) – Home (7–4) – Road (5–10)

#	Date	Time	Opponent	Score	Win	Loss	Save	Attendance	Record	Box
24	May 1	@ Mariners	2–5	Washburn (2–2)	Vázquez (2–1)	Putz (5)	2:21	20,739	12–12	box
25	May 2	@ Mariners	2–3	Batista (3–2)	Danks (0–4)	Putz (6)	2:03	16,555	12–13	box
26	May 4	@ Angels	1–5	Escobar (3–1)	Contreras (2–3)	Shields (2)	2:23	44,126	12–14	box
27	May 5	@ Angels	6–3	Garland (1–2)	Lackey (4–1)	Jenks (9)	2:41	42,574	13–14	box
28	May 6	@ Angels	4 – 3 (10)	Thornton (2–1)	Rodríguez (0–2)	Jenks (10)	2:57	42,017	14–14	box
29	May 8	@ Twins	4 – 7 (10)	Rincón (2–0)	Sisco (0–1)		3:10	21,979	14–15	box
30	May 9	@ Twins	6–3	Danks (1–4)	Ortiz (3–3)	Jenks (11)	2:29	24,367	15–15	box
31	May 10	@ Twins	3–0	Contreras (3–3)	Silva (2–3)		2:14	23,663	16–15	box
32	May 11	Royals	2–1	Garland (2–2)	Pérez (2–4)	Jenks (12)	2:20	34,522	17–15	box
33	May 12	Royals	5 – 4 (10)	MacDougal (1–0)	Duckworth (0–3)		3:21	36,702	18–15	box
34	May 13	Royals	1–11	de la Rosa (4–3)	Vázquez (2–2)		3:01	34,468	18–16	box
–	May 15	Yankees	Postponed (rain) Rescheduled for May 16							
35	May 16	Yankees	5–3	Danks (2–4)	Mussina (2–2)	Thornton (1)	2:38	30,953	19–16	box
36	May 16	Yankees	1–8	Wang (2–3)	Contreras (3–4)		3:00	34,609	19–17	box
37	May 17	Yankees	4–1	Garland (3–2)	DeSalvo (1–1)	Jenks (13)	2:48	30,488	20–17	box
38	May 18	@ Cubs	3–6	Lilly (4–2)	MacDougal (1–1)	Dempster (9)	2:36	40,874	20–18	box
39	May 19	@ Cubs	6–11	Howry (1–3)	Aardsma (2–1)		2:43	41,101	20–19	box
40	May 20	@ Cubs	10–6	Masset (2–1)	Zambrano (4–4)		3:02	41,164	21–19	box
41	May 21	Athletics	8–5	Contreras (4–4)	Blanton (4–2)	Jenks (14)	3:07	35,327	22–19	box
42	May 22	Athletics	10–4	Danks (2–4)	Lewis (0–1)		2:31	34,122	23–19	box
43	May 23	Athletics	0–4	Gaudin (4–1)	Garland (3–3)		2:35	29,051	23–20	box
44	May 25	Devil Rays	5–4	Jenks (2–1)	Orvella (0–2)		2:50	34,538	24–20	box
–	May 26	Devil Rays	Postponed (rain), rescheduled for August 27							
45	May 27	Devil Rays	5–11	Kazmir (3–2)	Vázquez (2–3)		3:18	38,103	24–21	box
46	May 28	@ Twins	4–10	Santana (6–4)	Contreras (4–5)		2:59	27,090	24–22	box
47	May 29	@ Twins	2–9	Bonser (4–1)	Danks (3–5)		2:46	23,771	24–23	box
48	May 30	@ Twins	6–7	Nathan (2–1)	MacDougal (1–2)		2:48	29,042	24–24	box
49	May 31	@ Blue Jays	0–2	Halladay (5–2)	Buehrle (2–2)	Accardo (8)	1:50	22,436	24–25	box

June (10–18) – Home (3–10) – Road (7–8)

#	Date	Time	Opponent	Score	Win	Loss	Save	Attendance	Record	Box
50	June 1	@ Blue Jays	3–0	Vázquez (3–3)	Burnett (5–5)	Jenks (15)	2:33	20,051	25–25	box
51	June 2	@ Blue Jays	3–9	McGowan (2–2)	MacDougal (1–3)	Janssen (2)	2:41	25,691	25–26	box
52	June 3	@ Blue Jays	3–4	Tallet (2–1)	Masset (1–2)	Accardo (7)	3:06	30,886	25–27	box
53	June 4	Yankees	6–4	Garland (4–3)	DeSalvo (1–3)	Jenks (16)	2:57	32,703	26–27	box
54	June 5	Yankees	3–7	Clippard (3–1)	Buehrle (2–3)	Rivera (6)	3:08	30,895	26–28	box
55	June 6	Yankees	1–5	Wang (5–4)	Vázquez (3–4)		2:40	30,829	26–29	box
56	June 7	Yankees	3–10	Proctor (1–3)	Contreras (4–6)	Rivera (7)	3:21	32,688	26–30	box
57	June 8	Astros	2–5	Sampson (6–5)	Danks (3–6)	Wheeler (11)	2:45	33,212	26–31	box
58	June 9	Astros	2–3	Qualls (5–3)	Jenks (2–2)		3:01	36,616	26–32	box
59	June 10	Astros	6–3	Buehrle (3–3)	Rodríguez (3–6)	Jenks (17)	2:23	33,433	27–32	box
60	June 11	@ Phillies	0–3	Eaton (7–4)	Vázquez (3–5)	Alfonseca (5)	2:31	31,989	27–33	box
61	June 12	@ Phillies	3–7	Hamels (9–2)	Contreras (4–7)		2:32	34,529	27–34	box
62	June 13	@ Phillies	4–8	Madson (1–2)	Thornton (2–2)		2:59	42,677	27–35	box
63	June 15	@ Pirates	2–4	Maholm (3–9)	Garland (4–4)	Capps (4)	2:41	26,647	27–36	box
64	June 16	@ Pirates	6–1	Buehrle (4–3)	Van Benschoten (0–1)		2:24	36,610	28–36	box
65	June 17	@ Pirates	7–8	Chacòn (3–1)	Masset (2–3)	Capps (5)	2:48	26,830	28–37	box
66	June 18	Marlins	10–6	Contreras (5–7)	Johnson (0–1)	Jenks (18)	2:58	36,132	29–37	box
67	June 19	Marlins	5–7	Benítez (1–3)	Thornton (2–3)	Gregg (12)	2:55	35,327	29–38	box
68	June 20	Marlins	4–5	Tankersley (4–1)	Garland (4–5)	Gregg (13)	2:54	32,007	29–39	box
69	June 22	Cubs	1–5	Zambrano (8–6)	Buehrle (4–4)		2:33	39,046	29–40	box
70	June 23	Cubs	1–2	Wuertz (1–2)	Jenks (2–3)	Howry (1)	2:57	39,043	29–41	box
71	June 24	Cubs	0–3	Marshall (4–2)	Contreras (5–8)	Howry (2)	3:04	39,194	29–42	box
72	June 25	@ Devil Rays	5–4	Danks (4–6)	Fossum (5–7)	Jenks (19)	3:19	10,514	30–42	box
73	June 26	@ Devil Rays	6–1	Garland (5–5)	Shields (6–3)		2:27	11,954	31–42	box
74	June 27	@ Devil Rays	5–3	Buehrle (5–4)	Glover (3–3)	Jenks (20)	3:03	10,492	32–42	box
75	June 28	@ Devil Rays	5–1	Vázquez (4–5)	Kazmir (5–4)		2:52	13,496	33–42	box
76	June 29	@ Royals	1–8	Bannister (5–4)	Contreras (5–9)	Greinke (1)	2:33	20,525	33–43	box
77	June 30	@ Royals	3 – 1 (10)	Bukvich (1–0)	Dotel (0–1)	Jenks (21)	2:41	25,119	34–43	box

July (14–15) – Home (9–7) – Road (5–8)

#	Date	Time	Opponent	Score	Win	Loss	Save	Attendance	Record	Box
78	July 1	@ Royals	3–1	Garland (6–5)	Thomson (1–1)	Jenks (22)	3:13	23,004	35–43	box
79	July 2	Orioles	6–7	Bell (1–1)	Jenks (2–4)	Ray (14)	2:53	35,161	35–44	box
80	July 3	Orioles	5–1	Vázquez (5–5)	Cabrera (6–9)		2:22	37,281	36–44	box
81	July 4	Orioles	6–9	Bell (2–1)	Contreras (5–10)		3:23	33,640	36–45	box
82	July 5	Orioles	11–6	Danks (5–6)	Burres (4–3)		2:46	30,364	37–45	box
83	July 6	Twins	14–20	Baker (3–3)	Garland (6–6)		3:42	31,543	37–46	box
84	July 6	Twins	0–12	Garza (1–0)	Floyd (0–1)		3:02	32,426	37–47	box
85	July 7	Twins	3–1	Buehrle (6–4)	Bonser (5–6)	Jenks (23)	2:20	36,791	38–47	box
86	July 8	Twins	6–3	Vázquez (6–5)	Silva (6–10)		2:20	32,724	39–47	box
All-Star Break: AL defeats NL 5–4 at AT&T Park
87	July 12	@ Orioles	9–7	Garland (7–6)	Guthrie (4–3)	Jenks (24)	3:03	21,000	40–47	box
88	July 13	@ Orioles	0–2	Bédard (8–4)	Buehrle (6–5)	Ray (15)	2:12	28,162	40–48	box
89	July 14	@ Orioles	6 – 7 (10)	Ray (5–6)	Haeger (0–1)		3:45	29,208	40–49	box
90	July 15	@ Orioles	3–5	Olson (1–0)	Contreras (5–11)	Ray (16)	2:50	29,382	40–50	box
91	July 16	@ Indians	11–10	Danks (6–6)	Lee (5–6)	Jenks (25)	3:36	21,460	41–50	box
92	July 17	@ Indians	5 – 6 (11)	Betancourt (2–0)	Day (0–1)		3:58	21,321	41–51	box
93	July 18	@ Indians	5–1	Buehrle (7–5)	Westbrook (1–5)		2:55	29,822	42–51	box
94	July 19	@ Red Sox	4–2	Vázquez (7–5)	Matsuzaka (11–7)	Jenks (26)	3:34	36,913	43–51	box
95	July 20	@ Red Sox	3–10	Beckett (13–3)	Contreras (5–12)		2:53	36,737	43–52	box
96	July 21	@ Red Sox	2–11	Gabbard (4–0)	Danks (6–7)		3:05	36,283	43–53	box
97	July 22	@ Red Sox	5–8	Wakefield (11–9)	Garland (7–7)	Papelbon (22)	3:14	36,346	43–54	box
98	July 23	Tigers	6–9	Grilli (4–2)	Buehrle (7–6)	Jones (27)	3:20	30,122	43–55	box
99	July 24	Tigers	5–3	Vázquez (8–5)	Bonderman (10–2)	Jenks (27)	2:20	30,569	44–55	box
100	July 24	Tigers	8–7	Thornton (3–3)	Miner (1–2)	Jenks (28)	3:30	29,042	45–55	box
101	July 25	Tigers	9–13	Grilli (5–2)	Contreras (5–13)	Byrdak (1)	3:27	28,462	45–56	box
102	July 26	Tigers	4–3	Jenks (3–4)	Miner (1–3)		2:39	30,567	46–56	box
103	July 27	Blue Jays	4–3	Garland (8–7)	Towers (5–7)	Jenks (29)	2:42	34,590	47–56	box
104	July 28	Blue Jays	2–0	Buehrle (8–6)	Halladay (11–5)	Jenks (30)	2:07	37,744	48–56	box
105	July 29	Blue Jays	1–4	Marcum (7–4)	Vázquez (8–6)	Accardo (17)	2:21	36,571	48–57	box
106	July 31	@ Yankees	3–16	Mussina (6–7)	Contreras (5–14)		2:59	53,958	48–58	box

August (9–20) – Home (5–9) – Road (4–11)

#	Date	Time	Opponent	Score	Win	Loss	Save	Attendance	Record	Box
107	August 1	@ Yankees	1–8	Pettitte (7–7)	Danks (6–8)		3:02	53,342	48–59	box
108	August 2	@ Yankees	13–9	Logan (2–0)	Karstens (0–2)		3:59	54,869	49–59	box
109	August 3	@ Tigers	7–4	Buehrle (9–6)	Miller (5–4)		2:46	42,066	50–59	box
110	August 4	@ Tigers	7–5	Vázquez (9–6)	Bonderman (10–4)	Jenks (31)	3:01	42,907	51–59	box
111	August 5	@ Tigers	3–1	Floyd (1–1)	Tata (1–1)	Jenks (32)	2:40	39,778	52–59	box
112	August 7	Indians	1–2	Westbrook (3–6)	Danks (6–9)	Borowski (31)	2:46	32,315	52–60	box
113	August 8	Indians	6 – 4 (13)	Contreras (6–14)	Fultz (3–2)		4:17	33,147	53–60	box
114	August 9	Indians	5–7	Laffey (1–1)	Buehrle (9–7)	Borowski (32)	3:03	36,399	53–61	box
115	August 10	Mariners	5–3	Vázquez (10–6)	Washburn (8–9)	Jenks (33)	2:36	38,586	54–61	box
116	August 11	Mariners	6–7	Batista (12–8)	Floyd (1–2)	Putz (34)	3:01	38,210	54–62	box
117	August 12	Mariners	0–6	Weaver (4–10)	Danks (6–10)		2:13	36,629	54–63	box
118	August 14	@ Athletics	3–4	DiNardo (7–6)	Garland (8–8)	Embree (15)	2:44	24,082	54–64	box
119	August 15	@ Athletics	2–3	Blanton (10–8)	Buehrle (9–8)	Street (10)	2:14	25,295	54–65	box
120	August 16	@ Athletics	5 – 8 (10)	Lugo (4–0)	Thornton (3–4)		3:32	20,218	54–66	box
121	August 17	@ Mariners	4–5	Batista (13–8)	Contreras (6–15)	Putz (35)	2:50	46,170	54–67	box
122	August 18	@ Mariners	5–7	Weaver (5–10)	Danks (6–11)	Putz (36)	2:31	41,121	54–68	box
123	August 19	@ Mariners	5–11	Hernández (9–6)	Garland (8–9)		2:54	45,668	54–69	box
124	August 20	Royals	4–3	Thornton (4–4)	Riske (1–3)	Jenks (34)	3:06	35,391	55–69	box
125	August 21	Royals	5–2	Vázquez (11–6)	Núñez (2–1)	Jenks (35)	3:01	35,309	56–69	box
126	August 22	Royals	6–7	Bannister (10–7)	Contreras (6–16)		3:11	31,739	56–70	box
–	August 23	Red Sox	Postponed (rain), rescheduled for August 24							
127	August 24	Red Sox	3–11	Beckett (16–5)	Garland (8–10)		3:47	30,581	56–71	box
128	August 24	Red Sox	1–10	Schilling (8–5)	Danks (6–12)		2:44	37,639	56–72	box
129	August 25	Red Sox	2–14	Wakefield (16–10)	Buehrle (9–9)		3:10	38,874	56–73	box
130	August 26	Red Sox	1–11	Tavárez (7–9)	Vázquez (11–7)		2:59	36,745	56–74	box
131	August 27	Devil Rays	5–4	Contreras (7–16)	Wheeler (1–6)	Jenks (36)	2:26	37,030	57–74	box
132	August 28	@ Rangers	3–4	Littleton (1–1)	MacDougal (1–4)	Benoit (2)	2:54	20,261	57–75	box
133	August 29	@ Rangers	4 – 5 (11)	Littleton (2–1)	Logan (2–1)		3:50	23,704	57–76	box
134	August 30	@ Rangers	1–5	Millwood (9–11)	Danks (6–13)		2:45	23,432	57–77	box
135	August 31	@ Indians	5–8	Fultz (4–2)	MacDougal (1–5)	Betancourt (1)	3:01	38,325	57–78	box

September (15–12) – Home (9–6) – Road (6–6)

#	Date	Time	Opponent	Score	Win	Loss	Save	Attendance	Record	Box
136	September 1	@ Indians	0–7	Byrd (14–5)	Vázquez (11–8)		2:37	41,131	57–79	box
137	September 2	@ Indians	8–0	Contreras (8–16)	Westbrook (5–8)		3:19	37,718	58–79	box
138	September 4	@ Tigers	3–1	Garland (9–10)	Bonderman (11–8)	Jenks (37)	3:04	32,505	59–79	box
139	September 5	@ Tigers	1 – 2 (11)	Seay (2–0)	Phillips (0–1)		3:44	32,980	59–80	box
140	September 6	@ Tigers	2–3	Seay (3–0)	Jenks (3–5)		2:42	35,977	59–81	box
141	September 7	Twins	11 – 10 (13)	Phillips (1–1)	Rincón (3–3)		4:29	34,104	60–81	box
142	September 8	Twins	8–7	Myers (4–0)	Cali (0–1)	Thornton (2)	3:25	31,747	61–81	box
143	September 9	Twins	2–5	Santana (15–11)	Garland (9–11)	Nathan (30)	2:37	32,250	61–82	box
144	September 10	Indians	2–6	Carmona (16–8)	Floyd (1–3)		2:53	30,126	61–83	box
145	September 11	Indians	3–8	Byrd (15–6)	Broadway (0–1)		3:23	31,939	61–84	box
146	September 12	Indians	7–4	Vázquez (12–8)	Westbrook (5–9)		2:54	23,537	62–84	box
147	September 14	Angels	5–3	Contreras (9–16)	Colón (6–7)	Jenks (38)	2:51	33,581	63–84	box
148	September 15	Angels	1–2	Weaver (12–7)	Garland (9–12)	Rodríguez (35)	3:13	36,485	63–85	box
149	September 16	Angels	9–7	MacDougal (2–5)	Moseley (4–3)		3:06	29,010	64–85	box
150	September 17	@ Royals	11–3	Vázquez (13–8)	Davies (6–14)		2:50	14,421	65–85	box
151	September 18	@ Royals	2–3	Meche (9–12)	Floyd (1–4)	Soria (16)	2:38	15,015	65–86	box
152	September 19	@ Royals	7–0	Contreras (10–16)	Bannister (12–9)		2:16	11,857	66–86	box
153	September 20	@ Royals	0–3	Greinke (7–6)	Garland (9–13)	Soria (17)	1:55	10,264	66–87	box
154	September 21	@ Twins	6–4	Buehrle (10–9)	Santana (15–13)	Jenks (39)	2:29	27,928	67–87	box
155	September 22	@ Twins	8–3	Vázquez (14–8)	Baker (9–9)		2:57	31,737	68–87	box
156	September 23	@ Twins	1–7	Slowey (4–0)	Floyd (1–5)		2:43	29,382	68–88	box
157	September 25	Royals	5–9	Duckworth (3–5)	Wassermann (0–1)		3:20	31,607	68–89	box
158	September 26	Royals	3–0	Garland (10–13)	Greinke (7–7)		2:21	32,091	69–89	box
159	September 27	Royals	10–0	Broadway (1–1)	Buckner (1–2)		2:30	34,477	70–89	box
160	September 28	Tigers	5–2	Vázquez (15–8)	Rogers (3–4)	Jenks (40)	2:40	30,281	71–89	box
161	September 29	Tigers	3–2	Wassermann (1–1)	Rodney (2–6)		2:47	33,066	72–89	box
162	September 30	Tigers	3–13	Robertson (9–13)	Contreras (10–17)		3:04	33,154	72–90	box

== Opening Day lineup ==
Pablo Ozuna, LF

Darin Erstad, CF

Jim Thome, DH

Paul Konerko, 1B

Jermaine Dye, RF

Joe Crede, 3B

Tadahito Iguchi, 2B

A. J. Pierzynski, C

Juan Uribe, SS

José Contreras, P

=== Roster ===
2007 Chicago White Sox
Roster
Pitchers: 54 David Aardsma; 41 Lance Broadway; 56 Mark Buehrle; 63 Ryan Bukvich; 52 José Contreras; 50 John Danks; 60 Dewon Day; 34 Gavin Floyd; 20 Jon Garland; 40 Charlie Haeger; 45 Bobby Jenks; 57 Boone Logan; 47 Mike MacDougal; 46 Nick Masset; 36 Mike Myers; 43 Heath Phillips; 62 Bret Prinz; 51 Andrew Sisco; 37 Matt Thornton; 33 Javier Vázquez; 62 Ehren Wassermann	Catchers: 44 Toby Hall; 55 Donny Lucy; 55 Gustavo Molina; 12 A. J. Pierzynski; Infielders: 8,42 Alex Cintrón; 24 Joe Crede; 27 Josh Fields; 15 Tadahito Iguchi; 14 Paul Konerko; 38 Pablo Ozuna; 1 Danny Richar; 25,42 Jim Thome; 5 Juan Uribe	Outfielders: 32 Brian Anderson; 23,42 Jermaine Dye; 17 Darin Erstad; 26 Andy González; 10 Rob Mackowiak; 7 Jerry Owens; 22 Scott Podsednik; 31 Ryan Sweeney; 30 Luis Terrero	Manager: 13 Ozzie Guillén; Coaches: 3 Harold Baines (first base); 21 Don Cooper (pitching); 28 Joey Cora (bench); 53 Art Kusnyer (bullpen); 18 Razor Shines (third base); 29 Greg Walker (hitting)

== Player stats ==
=== Batting ===
Note: G = Games played; AB = At Bats; R = Runs scored; H = Hits; 2B = Doubles; 3B = Triples; HR = Home runs; RBI = Runs batted in; BB = Base on balls; SO = Strikeouts; AVG = Batting average; SB = Stolen bases

Player	G	AB	R	H	2B	3B	HR	RBI	BB	SO	AVG	SB
Brian Anderson, OF	13	17	3	2	1	0	0	0	2	7	.118	0
Mark Buehrle, P	30	5	0	0	0	0	0	0	0	4	.000	0
Alex Cintrón, 3B, SS, 2B	68	185	23	45	7	1	2	19	9	35	.243	2
José Contreras, P	32	1	0	0	0	0	0	0	0	1	.000	0
Joe Crede, 3B	47	167	13	36	5	0	4	22	11	24	.216	0
John Danks, P	26	2	0	0	0	0	0	0	0	2	.000	0
Jermaine Dye, RF	138	508	68	129	34	0	28	78	45	107	.254	2
Darin Erstad, OF, 1B	87	310	33	77	13	1	4	32	28	44	.248	7
Josh Fields, 3B, LF	100	373	54	91	17	1	23	67	35	125	.244	1
Jon Garland, P	32	0	0	0	0	0	0	0	0	0	.000	0
Andy González, UT	67	189	17	35	6	0	2	11	25	61	.185	1
Toby Hall, C	38	116	8	24	4	0	0	3	3	12	.207	0
Tadahito Iguchi, 2B	90	327	45	82	17	4	6	31	44	65	.251	8
Paul Konerko, 1B	151	549	71	142	34	0	31	90	78	102	.259	0
Donny Lucy, C	8	15	0	3	0	0	0	0	0	6	.200	0
Rob Mackowiak, OF, 1B	85	237	34	66	11	2	6	36	23	53	.278	3
Gustavo Molina, C	10	18	0	1	0	0	0	1	1	4	.056	0
Nick Masset, P	27	1	0	0	0	0	0	0	0	1	.000	0
Jerry Owens, CF	93	356	44	95	9	2	1	17	27	63	.267	32
Pablo Ozuna, 3B, OF, 2B	27	78	9	19	3	0	0	3	3	9	.244	3
A. J. Pierzynski, C	136	472	54	124	24	0	14	50	25	66	.263	1
Scott Podsednik, LF	62	214	30	52	13	4	2	11	13	36	.243	12
Danny Richar, 2B	56	187	30	43	9	3	6	15	16	33	.230	1
Ryan Sweeney, OF	15	45	5	9	3	0	1	5	4	5	.200	0
Luis Terrero, OF	61	117	18	27	2	0	5	12	12	35	.231	4
Jim Thome, DH	130	432	79	119	19	0	35	96	95	134	.275	0
Matt Thornton, P	68	1	0	0	0	0	0	0	0	1	.000	0
Juan Uribe, SS	150	513	55	120	18	2	20	68	34	112	.234	1
Javier Vázquez, P	32	6	0	0	0	0	0	0	0	2	.000	0
Team totals	162	5441	693	1341	249	20	190	667	532	1149	.246	78

=== Pitching ===
Note: W = Wins; L = Losses; ERA = Earned run average; G = Games pitched; GS = Games started; SV = Saves; IP = Innings pitched; H = Hits allowed; R = Runs allowed; ER = Earned runs allowed; HR = Home runs allowed; BB = Walks allowed; K = Strikeouts

Player	W	L	ERA	G	GS	SV	IP	H	R	ER	HR	BB	K
David Aardsma	2	1	6.40	25	0	0	32.1	39	24	23	4	20	36
Lance Broadway	1	1	0.87	4	1	0	10.1	5	2	1	0	5	14
Mark Buehrle	10	9	3.63	30	30	0	201.0	208	86	81	22	50	115
Ryan Bukvich	1	0	5.05	45	0	1	35.2	36	23	20	5	25	18
José Contreras	10	17	5.57	32	30	0	189.0	232	134	117	21	63	113
John Danks	6	13	5.50	26	26	0	139.0	160	92	85	28	58	109
Dewon Day	0	1	11.25	13	0	0	12.0	19	15	15	1	9	7
Gavin Floyd	1	5	5.27	16	10	0	70.0	85	45	41	17	19	49
Jon Garland	10	13	4.23	32	32	0	208.1	219	114	98	19	60	98
Charlie Haeger	0	1	7.15	8	0	0	11.1	17	11	9	3	10	1
Bobby Jenks	3	5	2.77	66	0	40	65.0	45	20	20	2	17	56
Boone Logan	2	1	4.97	68	0	0	50.2	59	30	28	7	23	35
Mike MacDougal	2	5	6.80	54	0	0	42.1	50	37	32	3	36	39
Nick Masset	2	3	7.09	27	1	0	39.1	52	33	31	2	31	21
Mike Myers	1	0	11.20	17	0	0	13.2	21	19	17	3	9	6
Heath Phillips	1	1	3.68	6	0	0	7.1	10	3	3	1	5	2
Bret Prinz	0	0	8.10	4	0	0	3.1	4	3	3	1	3	1
Andy Sisco	0	1	8.36	19	0	0	14.0	19	13	13	2	11	13
Matt Thornton	4	4	4.79	68	0	2	56.1	59	31	30	4	32	55
Javier Vázquez	15	8	3.74	32	32	0	216.2	197	95	90	29	52	213
Ehren Wassermann	1	1	2.74	33	0	0	23.0	20	9	7	0	11	14
Team totals	72	90	4.77	162	162	42	1440.2	1556	839	763	174	549	1015

== Farm system ==
Level	Team	League	Manager
AAA	Charlotte Knights	International League	Marc Bombard
AA	Birmingham Barons	Southern League	Rafael Santana
A	Winston-Salem Warthogs	Carolina League	Tim Blackwell
A	Kannapolis Intimidators	South Atlantic League	Chris Jones
Rookie	Bristol White Sox	Appalachian League	Omer Muñoz
Rookie	Great Falls White Sox	Pioneer League	Chris Cron
