= Pablo Ozuna =

Dominican baseball player (born 1974)

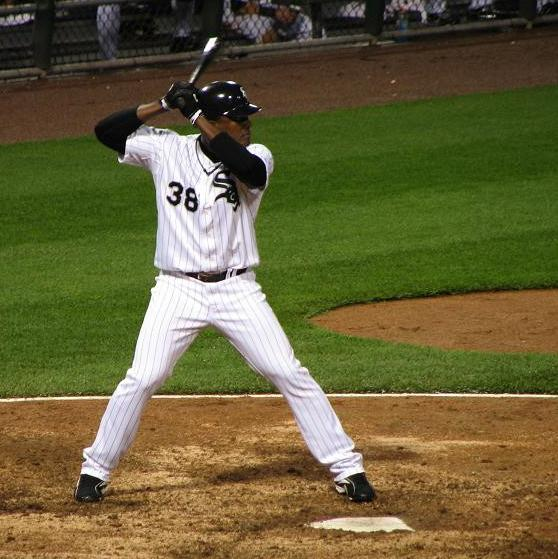
- Utility player
- Born: August 25, 1974 (age 51); Santo Domingo, Dominican Republic
- Batted: Right Threw: Right

MLB debut
- April 23, 2000, for the Florida Marlins

Last MLB appearance
- September 28, 2008, for the Los Angeles Dodgers

MLB statistics
- Batting average: .282
- Home runs: 3
- Runs batted in: 45
- Stats at Baseball Reference

Teams
- Florida Marlins (2000, 2002); Colorado Rockies (2003); Chicago White Sox (2005–2008); Los Angeles Dodgers (2008)

Career highlights and awards
- World Series champion (2005)

Pablo José Ozuna (born August 25, 1974) is a Dominican former professional baseball utility player. During his major league career, he played for the Florida Marlins (2000, 2002), the Colorado Rockies (2003), the Chicago White Sox (2005–2008), and the Los Angeles Dodgers (2008). He is the cousin of current Pittsburgh Pirates designated hitter Marcell Ozuna.

== Career ==
=== St. Louis Cardinals ===
Originally signed by the St. Louis Cardinals in 1996, Ozuna spent two years in the Cardinal farm system before being traded with Braden Looper and Armando Almanza to the Florida Marlins for Édgar Rentería on December 14, 1998.

=== Florida Marlins ===
Ozuna would spend four years with the Marlins organization before being traded again. This time, he was traded with Charles Johnson, Preston Wilson and Vic Darensbourg to the Colorado Rockies for Mike Hampton and Juan Pierre on November 16, 2002. In 48 games with Florida, Ozuna had 21 hits in 71 at bats for a .296 batting average.

=== Colorado Rockies ===
Ozuna spent one year with the Rockies, going 8-for-40 (.200) with 2 RBI in 17 games. He was released on December 14, 2003.

=== Detroit Tigers and Philadelphia Phillies ===
On January 9, 2004, Ozuna signed with the Detroit Tigers as a minor league free agent. On March 27, his contract was purchased by the Philadelphia Phillies. He spent the entire season with the Triple-A Scranton/Wilkes-Barre Red Barons, batting .307 with six home runs, 76 RBI and 31 stolen bases in 126 games.

=== Chicago White Sox ===
Ozuna signed with the Chicago White Sox on January 19, 2005. He appeared in a career high 70 games, and also had career highs with 203 at bats, 56 hits, and 11 RBI. Ozuna also had 14 stolen bases, including a steal of home on September 8.

On October 12, 2005, during Game 2 of the ALCS, A. J. Pierzynski advanced to first base on a controversial dropped third strike call. Ozuna pinch ran for him, stealing second base on the second pitch of the at bat to Joe Crede. Ozuna scored the game winning run on a double by Crede to end the controversial game. It was one of only two games Ozuna appeared in during the postseason as the White Sox won the World Series (the other being the night before).

Ozuna was brought back for 2006 and on May 3, 2006, he hit his first career home run, a solo shot, to tie the game with two outs in the ninth inning against Eddie Guardado of the Seattle Mariners. In the bottom of the 11th, Ozuna had another two-out hit, a bouncer up the middle that he stretched into a double. His heads up play allowed Juan Uribe to bat in the winning run with a soft fly ball to short left center. Later that season, on August 24, in a game against the Detroit Tigers, Ozuna fielded a play from left field that probably never happened and probably never will happen again. Detroit first baseman Sean Casey hit a line drive from pitcher Jon Garland drive to third baseman Joe Crede, who just missed gloving the ball. Crede tracked the ball, slowing it down as it rolled into left field. Casey had taken two steps before walking to the dugout, thinking Crede had made the grab. However, he soon noticed that the ball was still in play, and took off for first again. It was too late. Thinking on his feet, Ozuna scooped up the ball in left and fired across the way, beating Casey by a half step. It was a 5-7-3 putout. Ozuna finished the 2006 season batting .328 with two home runs and 17 RBI in 79 games.

On December 5, 2006, Ozuna signed a one-year, $800,000 contract with the White Sox to avoid arbitration. He later signed a one-year, $1.25 million contract extension with the team that included an option for the 2009 season on April 1, 2007. On May 27, 2007, Ozuna fractured his right fibula and tore the deltoid ligament in his ankle in a game against the Tampa Bay Devil Rays. Though he managed to walk off the field on his own power, he did not return for the remainder of the season. In 27 games, Ozuna hit .244 with 3 RBI.

Ozuna began the 2008 season batting .281 with 6 RBI in 32 games. Despite hitting .353 in June, he was designated for assignment on July 8, and was later released on July 16.

=== Los Angeles Dodgers ===
On July 20, 2008, Ozuna signed with the Los Angeles Dodgers for the remainder of the season. He made his debut with the team that day, where he was put in as a pinch-runner for Andy LaRoche after he singled in a run to make it a one-run game against the Arizona Diamondbacks in the top of the ninth with two out. Matt Kemp then doubled him home, tying the game. The Dodgers eventually won the game, and tied with Arizona for first place in the NL West.

On September 19, 2008, he hit his third career home run in a 7–1 loss to the San Francisco Giants.

=== Philadelphia Phillies ===
On January 15, 2009, Ozuna signed a minor league contract with an invitation to spring training with the Philadelphia Phillies, but began the season with the Phillies AAA minor league team, Lehigh Valley IronPigs, where he batted .294 with 15 RBI in 51 games. On June 11, he was suspended 50 games for violating the Major League Drug Prevention and Treatment Program. He was released on August 8, 2009.

=== Newark Bears ===
On July 9, 2010, Ozuna signed a contract with the Newark Bears of the independent Atlantic League of Professional Baseball. He played in 28 games for the Bears, hitting .294 with a home run and 13 RBI.
