= Juan Uribe =

Dominican baseball player (born 1979)

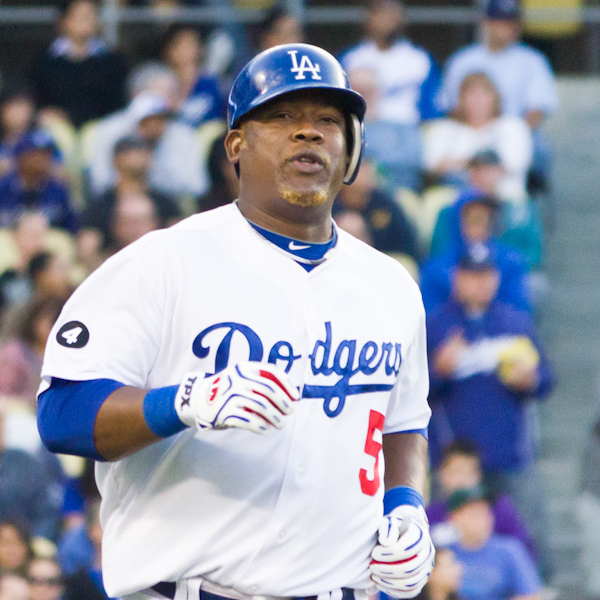
- Uribe with the Los Angeles Dodgers in 2011
- Infielder
- Born: March 22, 1979 (age 47); Palenque, Dominican Republic
- Batted: Right Threw: Right

MLB debut
- April 8, 2001, for the Colorado Rockies

Last MLB appearance
- July 30, 2016, for the Cleveland Indians

MLB statistics
- Batting average: .255
- Home runs: 199
- Runs batted in: 816
- Stats at Baseball Reference

Teams
- Colorado Rockies (2001–2003); Chicago White Sox (2004–2008); San Francisco Giants (2009–2010); Los Angeles Dodgers (2011–2015); Atlanta Braves (2015); New York Mets (2015); Cleveland Indians (2016)

Career highlights and awards
- 2× World Series champion (2005, 2010)

Juan Cespedes Uribe Tena (born March 22, 1979) is a Dominican former professional baseball infielder. He played in Major League Baseball (MLB) for the Colorado Rockies, Chicago White Sox, San Francisco Giants, Los Angeles Dodgers, Atlanta Braves, New York Mets and Cleveland Indians. He bats and throws right-handed.

Uribe began his professional career in 1997 when he was signed by the Colorado Rockies. After advancing through the minors, he made his MLB debut with the Rockies in 2001. He became their shortstop in 2001 and spent all of 2002 in that capacity. He missed part of 2003 with an injury and was traded to the Chicago White Sox following the season. After one season as a utility player, Uribe became the starting shortstop for the White Sox in 2005; he held that position for the next three years. While Uribe was with the White Sox, the team won the 2005 World Series against the Houston Astros. Uribe hit 21 home runs in 2006 but had a low on-base percentage. He hit 20 home runs in 2007 but had a low batting average with runners in scoring position (RISP). In 2008, Uribe lost his starting shortstop role to Orlando Cabrera and shifted to the starter at second, but then lost that job to rookie Alexei Ramírez. He eventually ended the season as the team's third baseman due to an injury to Joe Crede.

In 2009, Uribe signed with the Giants and was again used as utility player. He spent most of 2010 as the Giants' shortstop, hit a career-high 24 home runs, and had several key hits in the playoffs as the Giants won the 2010 World Series. Following that season, he signed a three-year contract with the Los Angeles Dodgers. The next two years were plagued by injuries and poor hitting, but he regained his starting role at third base and made strong contributions to the team in 2013 and 2014. Uribe was traded to the Braves in late May of the 2015 season and again to the Mets in July of the 2015 season. Before the start of spring training in 2016, he signed a one-year contract with the Cleveland Indians. He was injured by a ground ball on June 12, 2016, and was later diagnosed with a testicular contusion. The Indians designated him for assignment on August 1 and released him on August 5.

== Early life ==
Juan Cespedes Uribe Tena was born on March 22, 1979, in Palenque, Dominican Republic. Growing up, he became interested in baseball partly due to José Uribe. José was Juan's second cousin, although Juan calls him his "uncle" because of their age difference. When Major League Baseball (MLB) was not in season, José would come home to the Dominican Republic and tell Juan about his time in the majors playing shortstop for the San Francisco Giants. Juan proved to have baseball ability too. In 1997, Colorado Rockies scout Jorge Posada Sr. spotted Uribe while he was scouting pitcher Enemencio Pacheco.

== Professional career ==
=== Minor leagues ===
Posada offered him a $5,000 contract, but Uribe and his father tried to get a higher amount from agent Bob Michelin. Eventually, Uribe settled for $5,000.

Uribe started his professional career playing in the Dominican Summer League (DSL) for the DSL Rockies. In 1998 and 1999, he played for the rookie-level Arizona Rookie League and the Single-A Asheville Tourists in the South Atlantic League. While in Asheville, he batted .267 with 28 doubles, nine home runs and 46 RBI in 125 games, compiling a 15-game hitting streak at one point in the season. Uribe played for the Single-A advanced Salem Avalanche of the Carolina League in 2000, batting .256 with 13 home runs and 65 RBI in 134 games. Following the season, Baseball America named him the number two prospect in the Rockies' organization.

=== Colorado Rockies (2001–2003) ===
==== 2001: Rookie season ====
In 2001, he was called up by the Rockies. Uribe played 72 games for the Rockies in his rookie season of 2001. He batted .300, had eight home runs, and had 53 runs batted in (RBIs). He also had 11 triples, tying a club record held by Neifi Pérez and Juan Pierre. He made his major league debut on April 8, pinch-hitting and striking out against Jay Witasick in an 11–3 loss to the San Diego Padres. Three days later, he had his first major league hit against Matt Morris in a 3–1 loss to the St. Louis Cardinals. He was sent down to the Triple-A Colorado Springs Sky Sox of the Pacific Coast League a few times during the season. However, after July 25, he took over the shortstop position for the Rockies when they traded Pérez. On August 2, he hit his first major league home run against Dave Coggin in a 4–2 loss to the Philadelphia Phillies. He tied three other franchise records with two hits, two extra base hits, and six total bases in a single inning during an October 7 game against the San Diego Padres.

==== 2002 ====
Uribe played his first full season in the majors for the Rockies in 2002. He started 150 games at shortstop, posting a .240 average, six home runs, 49 RBI, and 25 doubles. He had a 17-game hitting streak during the months of April and May, a career-high. However, his offensive production slumped from May through August, and he also was poor defensively, leading the team with 27 errors. Uribe saw a little improvement offensively late in the season, though, as he tied a career-high for hits in a game with four on September 13 in a game against the Los Angeles Dodgers; he finished that game a home run short of the cycle.

==== 2003 ====
In 2003, Uribe did not play until June 3 because of an injury suffered when he was rounding the bases during a spring training game on March 1. In his first game back, he homered twice against Ricardo Rodríguez of the Cleveland Indians. He began to play in the outfield for the Rockies, starting at center field on June 15. However, he returned to the shortstop position when José Hernández was traded. In 87 games, he batted .253 with 80 hits, 19 doubles, 10 home runs, and 33 RBI.

=== Chicago White Sox (2004–2008) ===
==== 2004 ====
Uribe was traded to the Chicago White Sox on December 2, 2003, for second baseman Aaron Miles. Although Uribe did not have a starting role at the beginning of his tenure with the White Sox, he wound up appearing in 134 games for them in 2004, playing second base, shortstop, and third base. On June 19, he had seven RBIs (one short of the White Sox single-game record) in a 17–14 loss to the Montreal Expos. He set many career highs in batting categories, including batting average with the bases loaded (.556), RISP (.340), batting average (.283), home runs (23), RBIs (74), hits (142), and runs (82). He played much better at home, batting .315 with six home runs compared to .248 with seven home runs on the road. On December 16, Uribe agreed to a three-year, $9.75 million contract extension through 2007 with the White Sox. The deal also included a club option for 2008.

==== 2005: World Series ====
In 2005, Uribe spent the entire season playing shortstop after the White Sox did not re-sign José Valentín. In 146 games, a number that would have been higher had it not been for minor injuries, Uribe batted .252 with 121 hits, 23 doubles, 16 home runs, and 74 RBI. In Game 1 of the American League Division Series (ALDS), Uribe hit a home run and had three RBIs as the White Sox defeated the Boston Red Sox 14–2. Uribe made two memorable defensive plays for the final two outs of the 2005 World Series, first catching a ball while crashing into the third base stands and then ranging over the middle and firing an off-balance throw on a slow grounder to beat Houston Astros outfielder Orlando Palmeiro to give the White Sox their first title in 88 years.

==== 2006 ====
On July 2, 2006, Uribe had five RBIs in a 15–11 loss to the Chicago Cubs; two days later, he again had five RBIs in a 13–0 victory over the Baltimore Orioles. Uribe had one of his best power seasons in 2006, batting .235 with 21 home runs and 71 RBIs in 132 games. However, he had the lowest on-base percentage of his career, at .257. Injuries prevented him from appearing 10 games, and he also lost some starts at shortstop to Alex Cintrón because of his low on-base percentage. He led the White Sox in sacrifice hits and ranked fourth in the AL with a .977 fielding percentage. He also joined Derek Jeter, Miguel Tejada, Édgar Rentería, and Michael Young as the only shortstops to top 70 RBIs in 2004, 2005, and 2006.

==== 2007 ====
On September 29, 2007, Uribe had a walk-off RBI single against Fernando Rodney to give the White Sox a 3–2 win over the Detroit Tigers. In 150 games in 2007, Uribe batted .234 with 120 hits, 18 doubles, 20 home runs, and 68 RBI. He was second in the league in fielding percentage (.976), but he batted .198 with runners in scoring position. The White Sox declined Uribe's option for 2008, but on November 7, 2007, they signed him to a one-year, $4.5 million deal.

==== 2008 ====
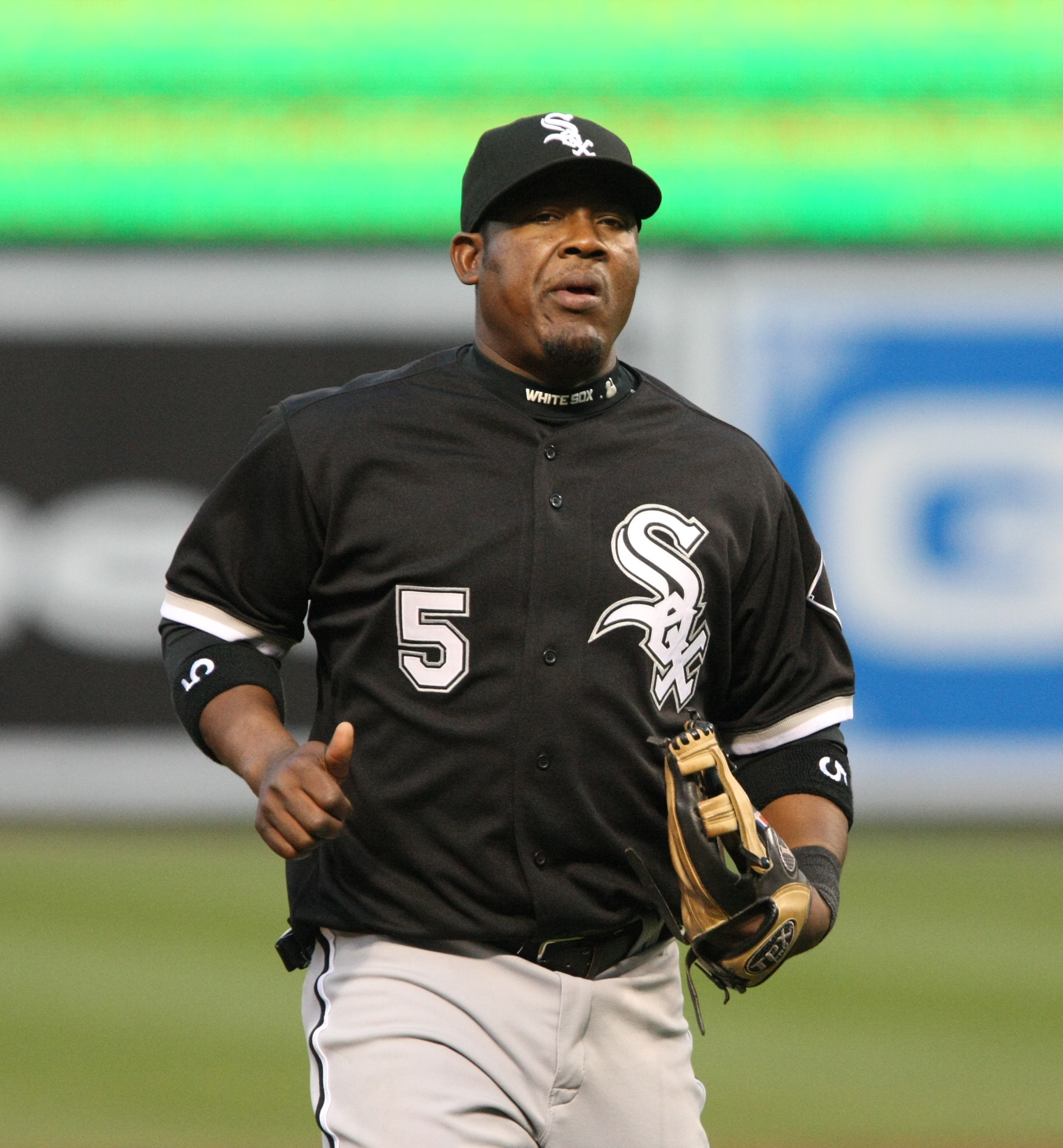
Uribe with the Chicago White Sox in 2008

The White Sox acquired Orlando Cabrera to play shortstop in 2008, forcing Uribe to compete with Alexei Ramírez, Danny Richar, and Pablo Ozuna for the position in spring training. Uribe won the second base job, but after an injury in May, Uribe lost his spot in the White Sox starting lineup to Ramírez. However, Uribe took over third base from Josh Fields (who had spent a week filling in for an injured Joe Crede) on August 1. In 110 games (324 at-bats), Uribe had 80 hits, 22 doubles, seven home runs, and 40 RBI. On October 30, Uribe filed for free agency.

While with the White Sox, Uribe was always regarded as a talented player. He was especially adept at fielding and hitting home runs. However, Ozzie Guillén had issues with Uribe's low on-base percentage and his conditioning.

=== San Francisco Giants (2009–2010) ===
==== 2009 ====
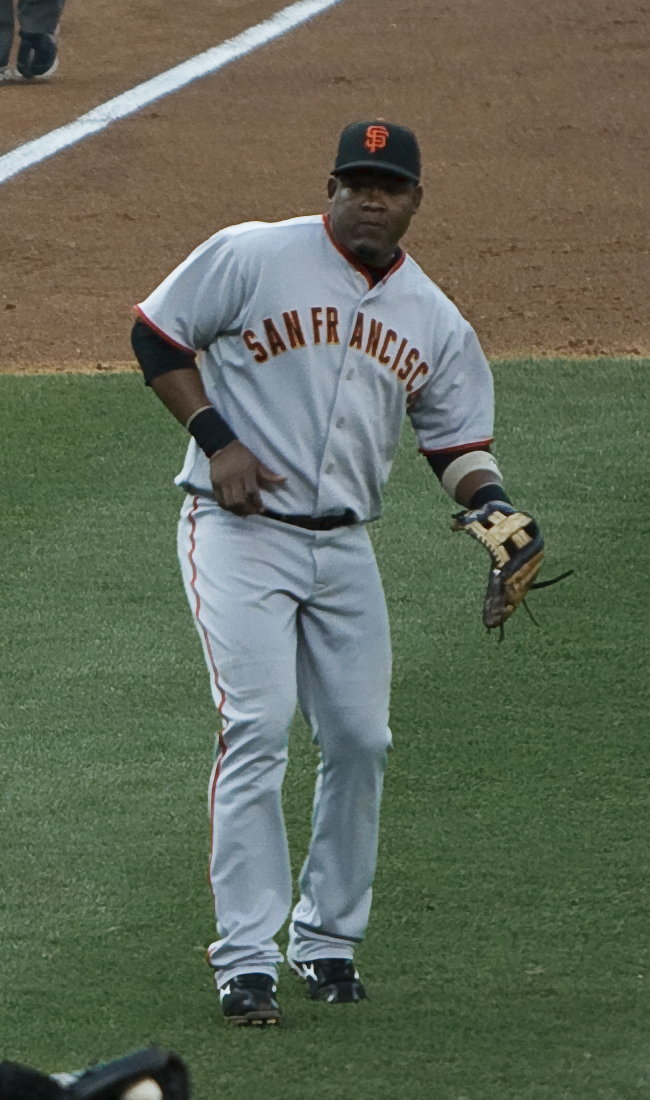
Uribe playing for the San Francisco Giants in 2009

On January 29, 2009, Uribe signed a minor league deal with the San Francisco Giants. It was announced on April 4 that Uribe had made the Giants final roster as a utility player. Uribe wound up making a lot of starts at second base, shortstop, and third base throughout the season. On July 10, Uribe bobbled a ground ball with one out in the eighth inning of Jonathan Sánchez's no-hitter against San Diego, allowing Chase Headley to reach first base. The effort had been perfect up to that point, and Sánchez went on to retire each of the remaining five batters, meaning this error lost the first perfect game since Randy Johnson 's in 2004. This was the first no-hit, no-walk, no–hit batsman game that was not also a perfect game since Terry Mulholland's no-hitter in 1990. In 122 games (398 at-bats), Uribe batted .289 (his highest average since 2001) with 115 hits, 26 doubles, 16 home runs, and 55 RBI.

==== 2010: World Series ====
On January 4, 2010, Uribe re-signed a one-year, $3.25 million contract with the Giants. He began 2010 as the Giants' second baseman because of an injury to Freddy Sanchez. At the beginning of May, he moved over to shortstop to replace the injured Édgar Rentería; for most of the remainder of the season, he was the Giants' starting shortstop. He hit a game-winning two-run home run on September 5 against Jonathan Broxton, turning a 4–3 deficit into a 5–4 victory over the Los Angeles Dodgers. On September 23, Uribe hit a grand slam against Ryan Dempster and a two-run home run in the second inning against the Cubs for a total of six RBIs, helping the Giants win 13–0.

He finished the season batting .256 with a career-high 24 home runs and a career-high 85 RBI. He had 129 hits on the year in 521 at-bats, bringing his career hit total above the 1,000 mark. He had 24 doubles and two triples. In Game 4 of the National League Championship Series against the Phillies on October 20, Uribe had a walk-off sacrifice fly against Roy Oswalt in a 6–5 victory. In Game 6, on October 23, he hit a go-ahead solo home run against Ryan Madson in the top of the eighth, which gave the Giants a 3–2 victory, sending them to the World Series. In Game 1 of the World Series on October 27, he hit a three-run home run against Darren O'Day which proved decisive in the Giants' 11–7 victory over the Texas Rangers. He produced an RBI that made it 2–0 against C. J. Wilson in the seventh inning of Game 2; he added another RBI in the eighth as the Giants won 9–0. The Giants won the series in five games, and Uribe earned his second World Series championship.

=== Los Angeles Dodgers (2011–2015) ===
==== 2011 ====
After the 2010 season, Uribe reached an agreement on a three-year, $21 million contract with the Los Angeles Dodgers. His first season with the Dodgers was one of his worst seasons as he made two trips to the disabled list and only managed to appear in 77 of 162 games, his fewest games since 2001. His production was the weakest of his career, as he hit a subpar .204 with four home runs and 28 RBI. He was placed on the disabled list on July 30, with what was described as abdominal pain. He was expected to return after 15 days, but the injury didn't get better and was recharacterized as a sports hernia, which needed season-ending surgery.

==== 2012 ====
In the 2012 season, Uribe mostly stayed healthy but his production remained similar to his 2011 totals. From May 14 to June 10, he was on the disabled list with a left wrist injury. After June, he lost his starting role and was relegated to pinch-hitting duties over the second half of the season. He played in just 66 games and hit only .191 (his lowest career total) with two home runs and 17 RBI.

==== 2013 ====
Uribe began 2013 as a utility player. However, he made frequent starts at third base, and by June, he had taken over the position. On July 5, Uribe had seven RBIs and was a single short of hitting for the cycle in a 10–2 victory over the Giants.

On September 9, 2013, Uribe went 4-for-4 and homered in each of his first three trips to the plate against the Arizona Diamondbacks. It was his first three-homer game in the Major Leagues. He played in 132 games for the Dodgers in 2013, almost as many as his first two seasons with them combined (143). He hit .278 with 12 home runs and 50 RBI. On October 7, during Game 4 of the NLDS, Uribe hit a two-run home run in the bottom of the eighth inning to put Los Angeles ahead of the Atlanta Braves 4–3. The Dodgers held on to defeat the Braves and took the series 3–1.

On December 14, 2013, Uribe agreed to a two-year, $15 million contract extension with the Dodgers.

==== 2014 ====
Uribe continued his resurgence in 2014, hitting .311 in 103 games. He also had nine home runs and 54 RBI. Uribe was well-liked by his teammates, and hailed as a key part of maintaining clubhouse chemistry. Don Mattingly let him manage the Dodgers for the final game of the regular season, a 10–5 Dodgers win.

==== 2015 ====
Uribe started slowly in 2015 and wound up falling behind both Justin Turner and Alex Guerrero on the depth chart. In 29 games, he hit .247 with one home run and 6 RBI.

=== Atlanta Braves (2015) ===
On May 27, 2015, Uribe was traded to the Atlanta Braves (with Chris Withrow) in exchange for Alberto Callaspo, Eric Stults, Ian Thomas and Juan Jaime. The trade was finalized during the Braves' three-game series at Dodger Stadium, and Uribe appeared in his new team's uniform in the third game, going 0-for-3 in the Atlanta win. When asked for an opinion on the trade, Uribe commented, "I would've felt bad if they traded me to a soccer, basketball or football team. But it's another baseball team, so I'm happy". Uribe's popularity as a Dodger extended past his trade, as a scheduled bobblehead night went ahead as planned after he had left the team for the Braves.

=== New York Mets (2015) ===
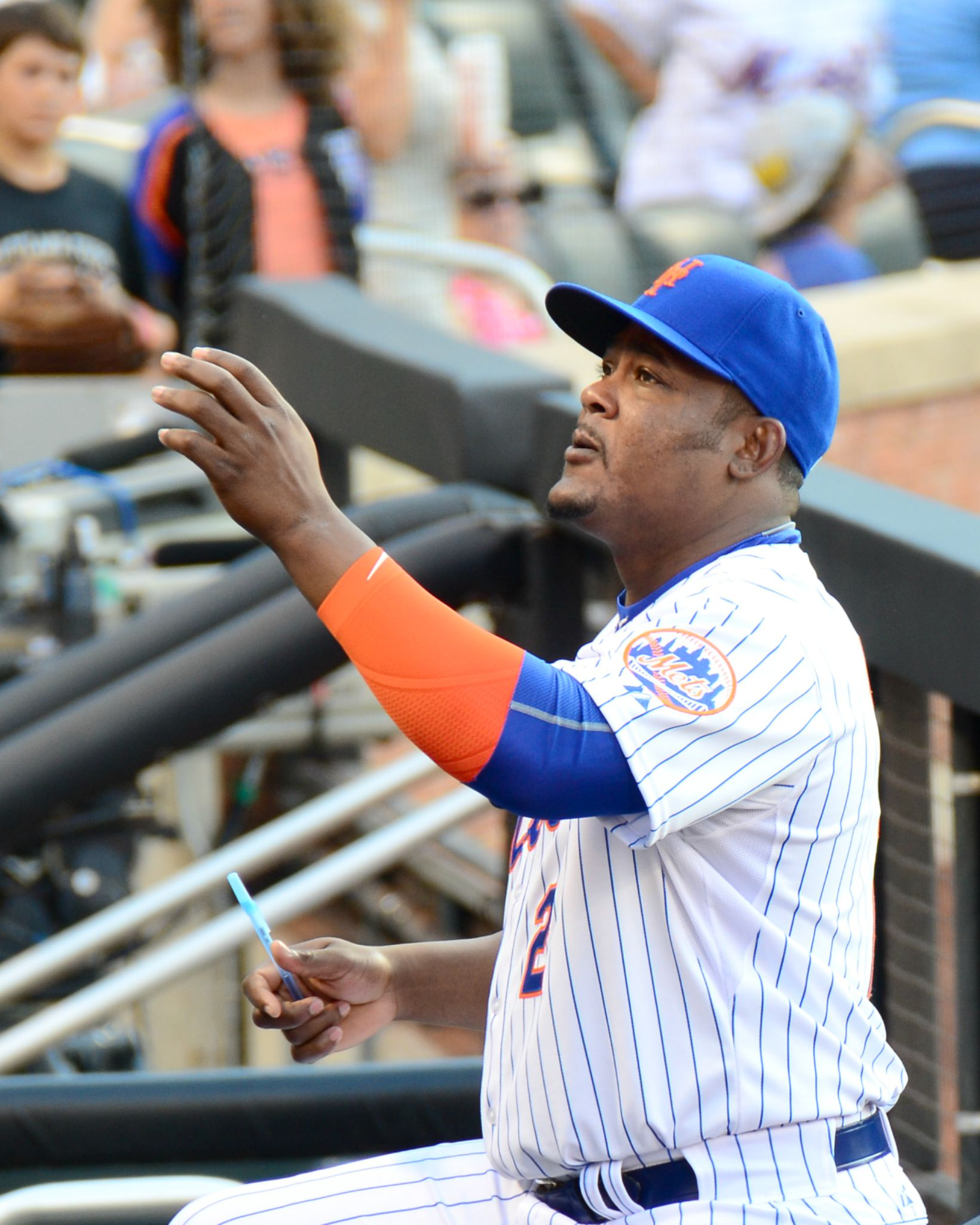
Uribe on July 25, 2015, one day after trade

On July 24, 2015, the Braves traded Uribe and Kelly Johnson to the New York Mets for John Gant and Rob Whalen. During his second game with New York, Uribe hit the walk-off single in the tenth inning to win the game for the Mets, 3–2 against the Los Angeles Dodgers. Uribe missed the National League Division Series and Championship Series due to a chest contusion in September, but was added to the Mets' World Series roster and came off the bench in the sixth inning of Game 3 to deliver a pinch-hit single, driving in a run. The Mets would lose the series in five games to the Kansas City Royals.

=== Cleveland Indians (2016) ===
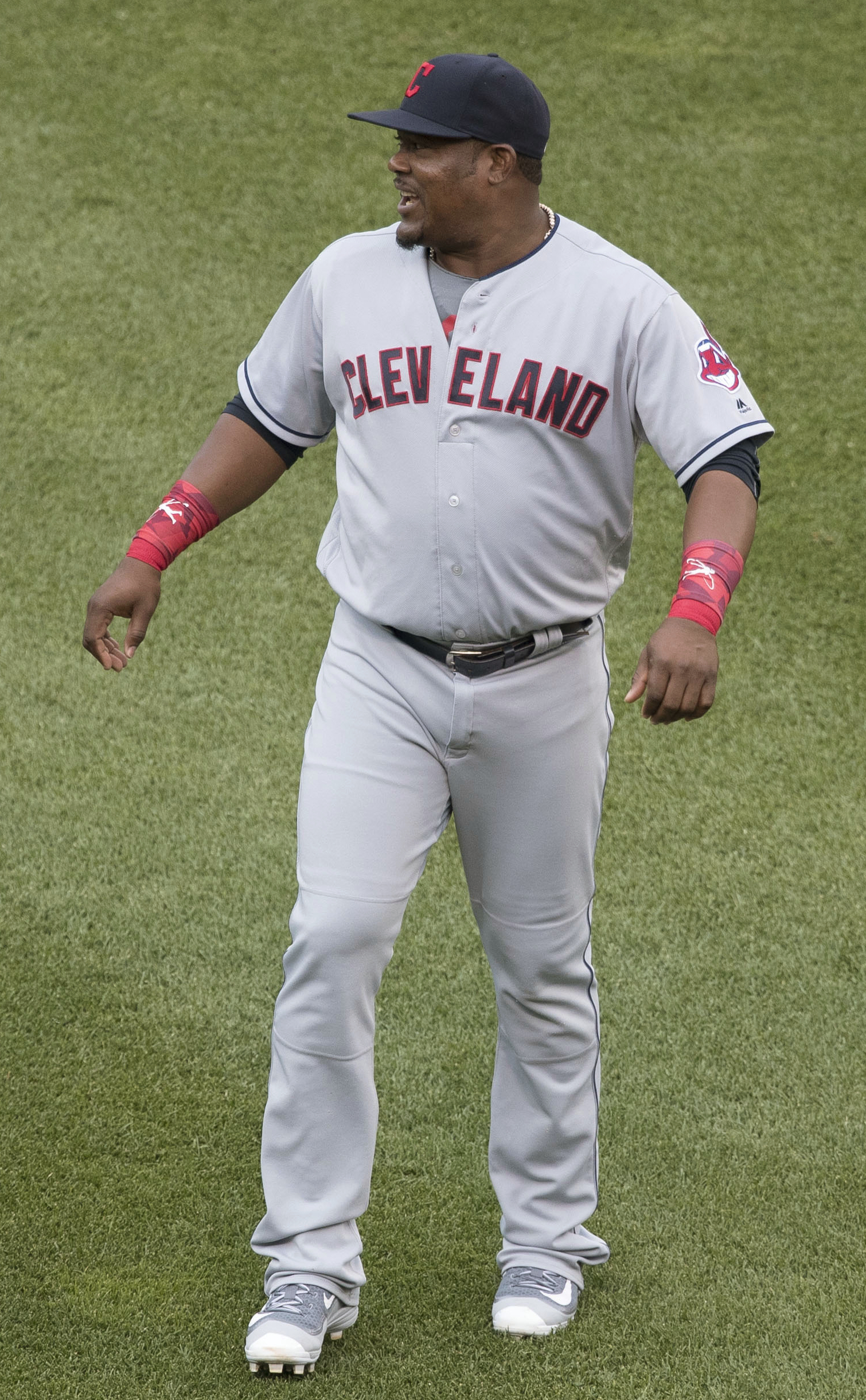
Uribe with the Cleveland Indians in 2016

Just before the start of spring training 2016, Uribe signed a one-year, $4 million deal with the Cleveland Indians. On June 12, 2016, in Anaheim, Uribe had to be carted off the field after being hit in the crotch by a ground ball which came off the bat of Mike Trout at 106 miles per hour (171 km/h). He was later diagnosed with a testicular contusion. He was designated for assignment on August 1, 2016, and released on August 5.

== Personal life ==
Uribe and his wife Ana have four children: Juan Luis, Juanny, Janny, and Johanny. He also has a brother named Elpidio. Although Uribe does speak English, he is not fluent, so he often used a translator throughout his career when conducting interviews. He plays winter baseball in the Dominican Republic every year. He has done work for many different charity organizations. In 2004, he read to children on the Golden Apple Foundation Bus. He also helped with the United States military children's coloring contest.

=== 2006 shooting allegations ===
In October 2006, Uribe was alleged to have been involved in a shooting in his native Dominican Republic. A farmer named Antonio Gonzalez Perez accused Uribe of wounding him with a pellet gun. Despite claims by the San Cristóbal Province District Attorney that there was no firm evidence that Uribe was involved in the incident, a judge decided to press forward with the case. Although a defense motion to bar him from leaving the country was rejected, it was ruled on January 5, 2007, that Uribe must appear before a court on the 15th and the 30th days of every month until the case was resolved. Uribe, who denied any involvement in the case, suggested that he might not play baseball until the legal proceedings were concluded. He was confident that he would win in court, and the White Sox expected him to be free for spring training. In February, his name was cleared of any involvement with the shooting, and the court ruled he no longer had to appear twice per month. Uribe called the incident "blackmail", saying it was an attempt by Perez to get money from him.
