= Jon Garland =

American baseball pitcher (born 1979)

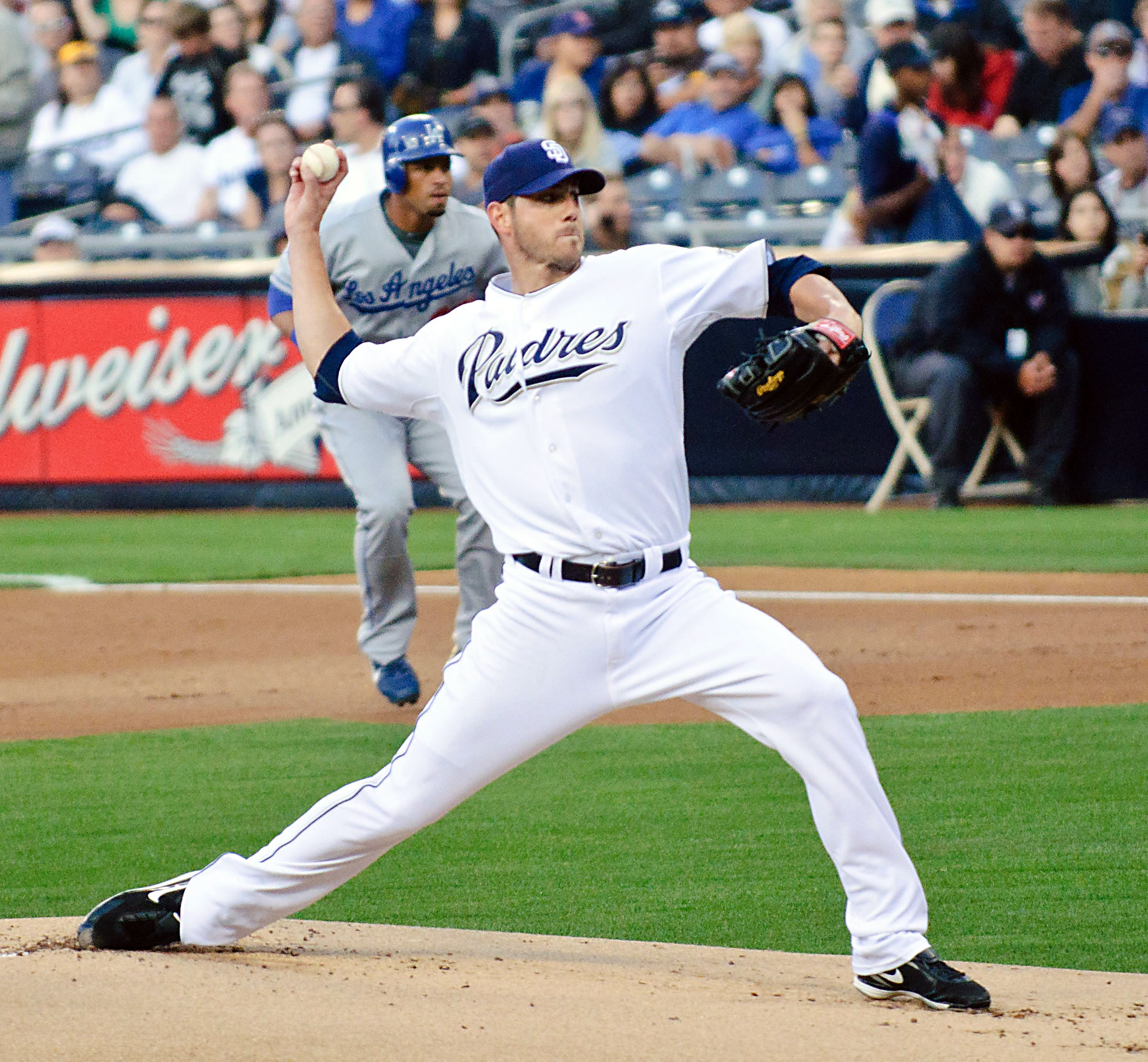
- Garland with the San Diego Padres in 2010
- Pitcher
- Born: September 27, 1979 (age 46); Santa Clarita, California, U.S.
- Batted: Right Threw: Right

MLB debut
- July 4, 2000, for the Chicago White Sox

Last MLB appearance
- June 5, 2013, for the Colorado Rockies

MLB statistics
- Win–loss record: 136–125
- Earned run average: 4.37
- Strikeouts: 1,156
- Stats at Baseball Reference

Teams
- Chicago White Sox (2000–2007); Los Angeles Angels of Anaheim (2008); Arizona Diamondbacks (2009); Los Angeles Dodgers (2009); San Diego Padres (2010); Los Angeles Dodgers (2011); Colorado Rockies (2013)

Career highlights and awards
- All-Star (2005); World Series champion (2005)

Jon Steven Garland (born September 27, 1979) is an American former professional baseball starting pitcher. After being drafted by the Chicago Cubs of Major League Baseball (MLB) in 1997, Garland played for the Chicago White Sox, Los Angeles Angels of Anaheim, Arizona Diamondbacks, Los Angeles Dodgers, San Diego Padres, and Colorado Rockies.

== Early life ==
Garland and his two sisters Kim and Kerrie Garland were raised in Granada Hills, Los Angeles, by their mother, Vikki, after she divorced their father when Garland was young.

Garland played baseball at John F. Kennedy High School in Granada Hills. As a senior, he was named a preseason All-American by Baseball America. He was also named to the 1997 All-America First Team by the American Baseball Coaches Association and Rawlings. Garland committed to play college baseball for the USC Trojans.

== Professional career ==
=== Chicago Cubs ===
==== Minor leagues ====
Garland was selected by the Chicago Cubs with the tenth pick of the 1997 Major League Baseball draft and signed for $1.325 million. He pitched in 10 games for the rookie-level Arizona League Cubs with a 3–2 record and a 2.70 ERA to finish the season. He began 1998 with the Single-A Rockford Cubbies.

=== Chicago White Sox ===
On July 29, 1998, Garland was traded to the Chicago White Sox just before the trade deadline in exchange for relief pitcher Matt Karchner who had previous success in the majors, but was having a down season with the White Sox (5.15 ERA). Unfortunately for the Cubs, Karchner did not fare any better with them that season (5.14 ERA) and was released in 2000 while Garland dominated the minor leagues on his way to securing a spot in the White Sox's rotation for seven seasons.

Garland started 1999 with High-A Winston-Salem and after 19 starts and a 3.33 ERA, Garland was promoted to Double-A Birmingham. In 2000, he was the White Sox's #2 prospect and went 9–2 with a 2.26 ERA for Triple-A Charlotte before earning a promotion to the major leagues. For his success in Triple-A, Garland was voted a Triple-A All-Star and International League All-Star and to Baseball America's 2nd team Minor League All-Star team and the International League Most Valuable Pitcher. He started 2001 with Charlotte again, but was back in the majors after only 5 starts.

==== Major leagues ====
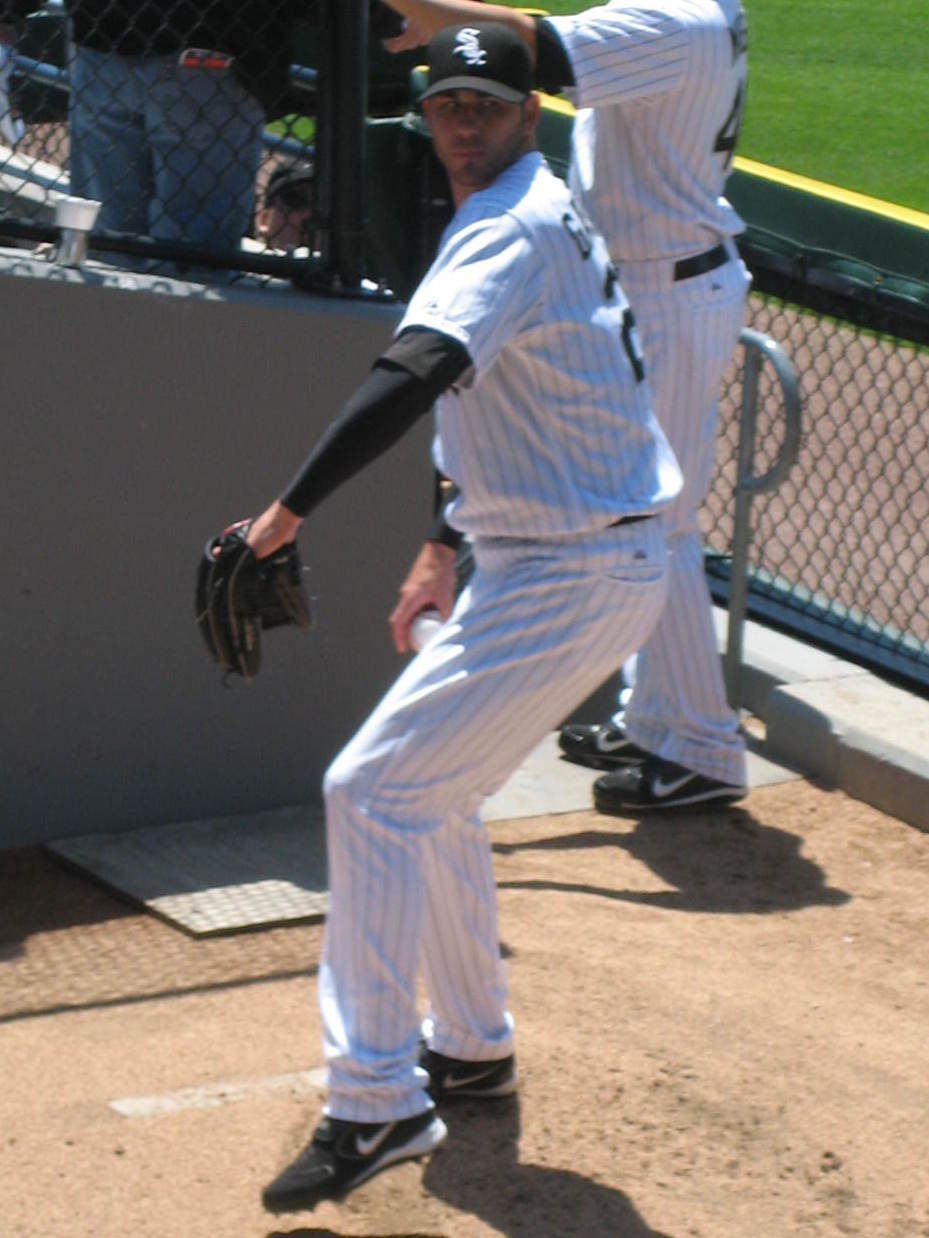
Garland with the White Sox in 2007

Garland made his major league debut as the youngest player in the American League at age 20 on July 4, 2000, against the Kansas City Royals, but gave up 7 earned runs before being chased from the game after 3 innings. In 15 games in 2000, all but 2 of them starts, he had a 4–8 record and a 6.46 ERA. In 2001, Garland started in the minors, but was called up and made his first appearance of the year on May 2. On May 12, 2001, he gave up Alex Rodriguez' 200th home run. Garland spent the rest of the year mixing his time between the bullpen and rotation.

In 2002, he became a full-time starter and posted average seasons the next three years. In 2002, he was 12–12 with a 4.58 ERA, in 2003, he was 12–13 with a 4.51 ERA, and in 2004, he was 12–11 with a 4.89 ERA. Garland's 2005 season was very strong; he went 18–10 with a 3.50 ERA, 115 strikeouts, and led the AL with 3 shutouts. He also made the All-Star Team, pitching 1 scoreless inning, and helped the White Sox win the American League Central Division and the 2005 World Series. In Garland's first career postseason start, he threw a complete game, 4-hitter, with 7 strikeouts against the Los Angeles Angels of Anaheim, in the ALCS. In his other postseason start, in the World Series, Garland pitched 7 innings and gave up only 2 earned runs.

Following the 2005 season, Garland signed a three-year $29 million contract, avoiding salary arbitration. 2006 was similar to his seasons before 2005. Despite having a 4.51 ERA, he went 18-7 and his 46 combined wins from 2004 to 2006 were tied for the sixth most in the majors over that period. He also hit his first major league home run on June 18, 2006, off Cincinnati Reds pitcher Esteban Yan. During the 2006 offseason, Garland was nearly traded to the Houston Astros for Taylor Buchholz, Willy Taveras, and Jason Hirsh. The trade fell apart after White Sox general manager Kenny Williams became concerned with the health of Buchholz.

=== Los Angeles Angels of Anaheim ===
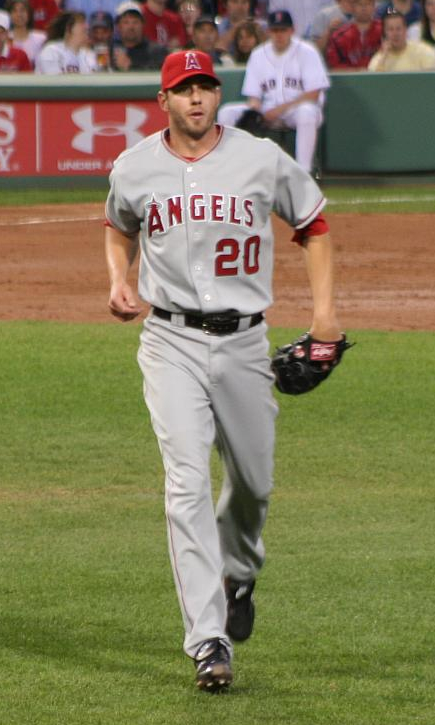
Garland playing for the Angels in 2008

After another average season in 2007, Garland was traded on November 19, 2007, to the Los Angeles Angels of Anaheim for shortstop Orlando Cabrera. The Angels, who had depth at shortstop, liked Garland's durability and he did not disappoint in 2008; he extended his streak of at least 32 games started to 7 consecutive seasons.

=== Arizona Diamondbacks ===
On January 29, 2009, Garland signed a one-year deal with the Arizona Diamondbacks with an option for 2010. He was 8–11 with a 4.29 ERA in 27 starts for the Diamondbacks.

=== Los Angeles Dodgers ===
Garland was traded to the Los Angeles Dodgers on August 31, 2009, for a player to be named later (Tony Abreu). He was already in Los Angeles as the Diamondbacks were playing the Dodgers that day. Television camera showed Garland being told of the trade during the sixth inning. He made his Dodgers debut on September 3, 2009, pitching against his old teammates. During this game, the Diamondbacks broadcasters found their key of the game from a 9th grader which was, "Keep your friends close, keep Jon Garland closer." He pitched in six games for the Dodgers, finishing 3–2 with a 2.72 ERA but was left off the post-season roster. After the season, the Dodgers declined the $10 million option on Garland for the 2010 season, making him a free agent.

=== San Diego Padres ===
On January 26, 2010, Garland agreed to a one-year deal with the San Diego Padres. Jon Garland recorded the 1000th strikeout of his career on May 30, 2010, which helped beat the Nationals 3–2 in extra innings. He finished the season 14–12 with a 3.47 ERA in 33 starts.

=== Los Angeles Dodgers (second stint) ===
On November 26, 2010, Garland signed a 1-year $5 million deal with an option for 2012 to return to the Dodgers as the fifth starter in their rotation. He started nine games with the Dodgers and had a 1–5 record and a 4.33 ERA when he was placed on the disabled list on June 2 with shoulder discomfort. On July 5, it was announced that he would have surgery on his shoulder and would not pitch again during the 2011 season.

On October 4, 2011, the Dodgers announced that they were declining Garland's 2012 option and paying him a buyout of $500,000.

=== Cleveland Indians ===
In January 2012, Garland agreed to a minor league contract with the Cleveland Indians, which included an invitation to spring training. However, Garland never took his physical and the Indians cancelled the deal on February 22.

=== Seattle Mariners ===
Garland signed a minor league contract with the Seattle Mariners on February 12, 2013. Despite pitching to a 2.25 ERA in spring training, Seattle decided not to guarantee him a spot in the starting rotation. On March 22, 2013, he used his opt out clause and became a free agent.

=== Colorado Rockies ===
After being granted his release, Garland signed a major league contract with the Colorado Rockies prior to the start of the 2013 baseball season Garland had substantial incentives in his contract with the Rockies that could raise its total value to $3.1 million. In addition to his base $500,000 deal, which would have fully vested if he had stayed on the 25-man roster for 45 days, Garland could also have earned up to $1.35 million for his innings pitched (the pay starts at 105 IP and increases up to 195 IP) and up to $1.25 million for starts made (with the incentives kicking in at 20 starts and continuing to 32 starts).

Garland was designated for assignment on June 8, 2013. He was 4-6 through 12 starts with a 5.82 ERA for the Rockies. He was released by the Rockies on June 10.

=== 2014 season ===
Garland stated through his agent he might sit out the whole 2014 season due to lack of interest from MLB teams.

Garland was eligible to be elected into the Hall of Fame in 2019, but received less than 5% of the vote and became ineligible for the 2020 ballot.

== Scouting report ==
Garland was mainly a sinkerballer all throughout his career. He threw a sinker at 89 MPH, a 4-seam fastball at 88 MPH, a curveball at 76–79 MPH & a changeup at 75 MPH. He'd been prone to give up a lot of hits but was a workhorse and a staple in many organizations' rotations. From 2002 to 2011, he averaged more than 190 innings for 3 organizations (White Sox, Angels & Padres). He owns a career 1.31 groundball-to flyball ratio.

== Personal life ==
Garland's longtime wife is USA softball second baseman Lovieanne Jung. The couple have two daughters. His agent is Craig Landis, who is the son of former White Sox outfielder Jim Landis.

Garland appeared in an episode of The Bernie Mac Show.

Garland's cousin is PGA Tour professional Brian Vranesh.

Garland attended Van Gogh Elementary and Robert Frost Middle School in Granada Hills, California.
