= Matt Thornton (baseball) =

American baseball pitcher (born 1976)

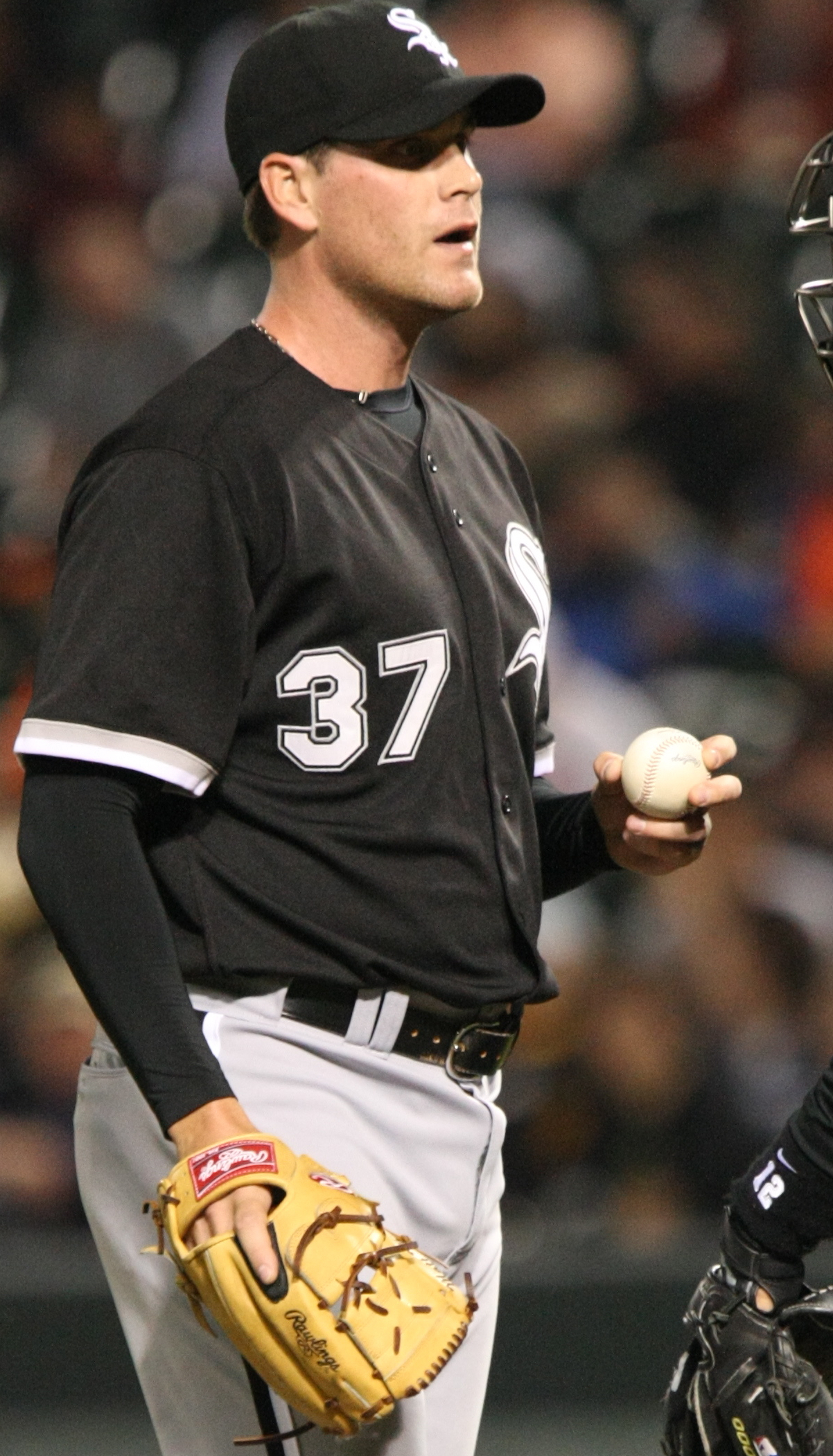
- Thornton with the Chicago White Sox in 2008
- Pitcher
- Born: September 15, 1976 (age 49); Three Rivers, Michigan, U.S.
- Batted: Left Threw: Left

MLB debut
- June 27, 2004, for the Seattle Mariners

Last MLB appearance
- August 2, 2016, for the San Diego Padres

MLB statistics
- Win–loss record: 36–46
- Earned run average: 3.41
- Strikeouts: 642
- Stats at Baseball Reference

Teams
- Seattle Mariners (2004–2005); Chicago White Sox (2006–2013); Boston Red Sox (2013); New York Yankees (2014); Washington Nationals (2014–2015); San Diego Padres (2016)

Career highlights and awards
- All-Star (2010)

Matthew J. Thornton (born September 15, 1976), is an American former professional baseball pitcher. Born in Three Rivers, Michigan he grew up and attended high school in Centreville. He played in Major League Baseball (MLB) for the Seattle Mariners, Chicago White Sox, Boston Red Sox, New York Yankees, Washington Nationals, and San Diego Padres. Thornton is second all-time in American League history in holds (182).

== College and minor league baseball ==
In the 1995 MLB draft, Thornton was drafted by the Detroit Tigers in the 27th round (742nd overall) but chose not to sign with them. Thornton attended Grand Valley State University, initially on a basketball scholarship. He had 102 strikeout for the Lakers and set a school record with 12.3 strikeouts per nine innings.

Thornton was drafted by the Seattle Mariners in the first round (22nd overall) of the 1998 MLB draft. He made his professional debut with the Single-A Everett AquaSox that summer, allowing 4 runs while getting only 4 outs. In 1999 and 2000, Thornton was a starting pitcher with the Single-A Wisconsin Timber Rattlers and showed improvement with his ball control and accuracy, striking out nearly one batter per inning. In 2001, He had a breakout year for the High-A San Bernardino Stampede, where he posted a 14–7 record in 27 starts, along with a stellar 2.52 ERA and 192 strikeouts in only 157 innings pitched.

Thornton was then promoted to the Double-A San Antonio Missions in 2002. Still a starting pitcher, he pitched well, making 12 starts and going 1–5 with a 3.63 ERA and 44 strikeouts in 62 innings pitched. However, he hurt his arm in June, requiring Tommy John surgery. He returned to the mound in May 2003, pitching briefly with the High-A Inland Empire 66ers, but was quickly promoted back up to San Antonio again. He started only four games, but posted an incredible 0.36 ERA, with a 3–1 record, gave up only eight hits in 25.1 innings of work and struck out 18 batters. His performance got him promoted that same year to the Triple-A Tacoma Rainiers. He had a shaky start to his career in Triple-A ball, starting two games and posting an 0–2 record and an 8.00 ERA.

Thornton stayed with Tacoma in 2004 and posted a 7–5 record in 16 games (15 starts), along with a 5.20 ERA and 74 strikeouts in 83 innings pitched.

== Major Leagues ==
=== Seattle Mariners ===
==== 2004 ====
Thornton made his MLB debut on June 27, 2004, with the Mariners in a game against the San Diego Padres, pitching brilliantly over four innings, only allowing three hits and striking out one batter. Throughout the season, the Mariners used Thornton mostly as a middle reliever, except for one game on July 10, when he started against the Chicago White Sox. He pitched five innings, allowing four runs, three hits, and seven walks in a loss. Thornton finished the 2004 season with a 1–2 record and 4.13 ERA in 19 games (one start), striking out 30 batters in 32 2/3 innings of work.

==== 2005 ====
In 2005, Thornton served his reliever duties, pitching in 55 games and going 0–4 with a 5.21 ERA. He struck out 57 batters in 57 innings pitched.

=== Chicago White Sox ===
==== 2006 ====
On March 20, 2006, Thornton was traded from the Seattle Mariners to the Chicago White Sox for outfielder Joe Borchard. Under the tutelage of pitching coach Don Cooper, Thornton emerged as a dominant bullpen force. In the 2006 season, Thornton appeared in 63 games, going 5–3 with two saves and a 3.33 ERA.

==== 2007 ====
Thornton's 2007 season was a little busier, as he made 68 relief appearances with a 4–4 record, two saves and a 4.79 ERA.

==== 2008 ====
Thornton made 74 appearances out of the bullpen in 2008, going 5–3 with one save and a 2.67 ERA.

==== 2009 ====
Thornton pitched in five games for the United States in the 2009 World Baseball Classic, allowing 4 runs in 4 2/3 innings. In the regular season, he made 70 appearances, going 6–3 with four saves and a 2.74 ERA.

==== 2010 ====
Thornton was selected by the coaches' vote to the American League All-Star team in 2010, the first All-Star selection of his career. In 2010, he made 61 appearances, going 5–4 with eight saves and a 2.67 ERA.

==== 2011 ====
Appearing in 62 games in 2011, Thornton went 2–5 with three saves and a 3.32 ERA.

==== 2012 ====
2012 was somewhat unlucky for Thornton, as his loss column led all relievers in baseball. He went 4–10 with three saves and a 3.46 ERA in 74 relief appearances.

==== 2013 ====
Thornton made 40 appearances for the White Sox to start the 2013 season, going 0–3 and a 3.86 ERA.

In 512 career relief appearances with the White Sox spanning 463.1 innings, Thornton compiled a 3.28 ERA. As of September 12, he led all eligible American League relievers with 12.3 strikeouts per nine innings.

From 2008 to 2013, Thornton pitched in more games than any other left-handed reliever. He also holds the record for most holds with a single team, with 164 for the White Sox.

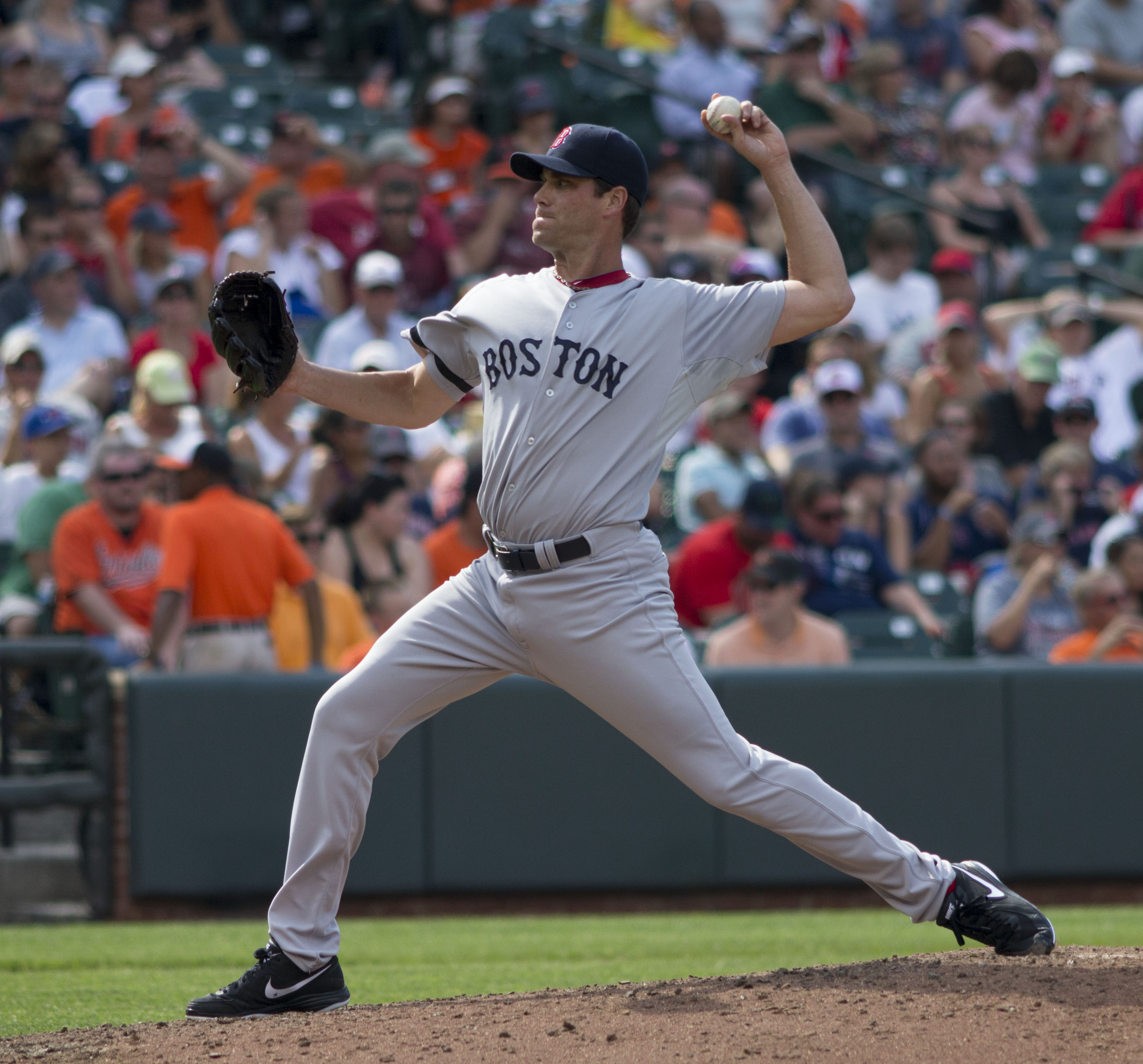
Thornton pitching for the Boston Red Sox in 2013

=== Boston Red Sox ===
On July 12, 2013, Thornton was traded to the Boston Red Sox for minor league outfielder Brandon Jacobs. The Red Sox also received cash considerations. For the rest of the 2013 season with the Red Sox, Thornton's playing time was limited due to an oblique strain, but he made 20 appearances out of the bullpen, going 0–1 with a 3.52 ERA. Overall in 2013, combined with both teams, Thornton made 60 total relief appearances going 0–4 and a 3.74 ERA. The Red Sox finished 97–65, making it to the postseason and eventually winning the World Series over the St. Louis Cardinals. Thornton, although he did not make any postseason appearances, still received his first career championship ring. He became a free agent following the season.

=== New York Yankees ===
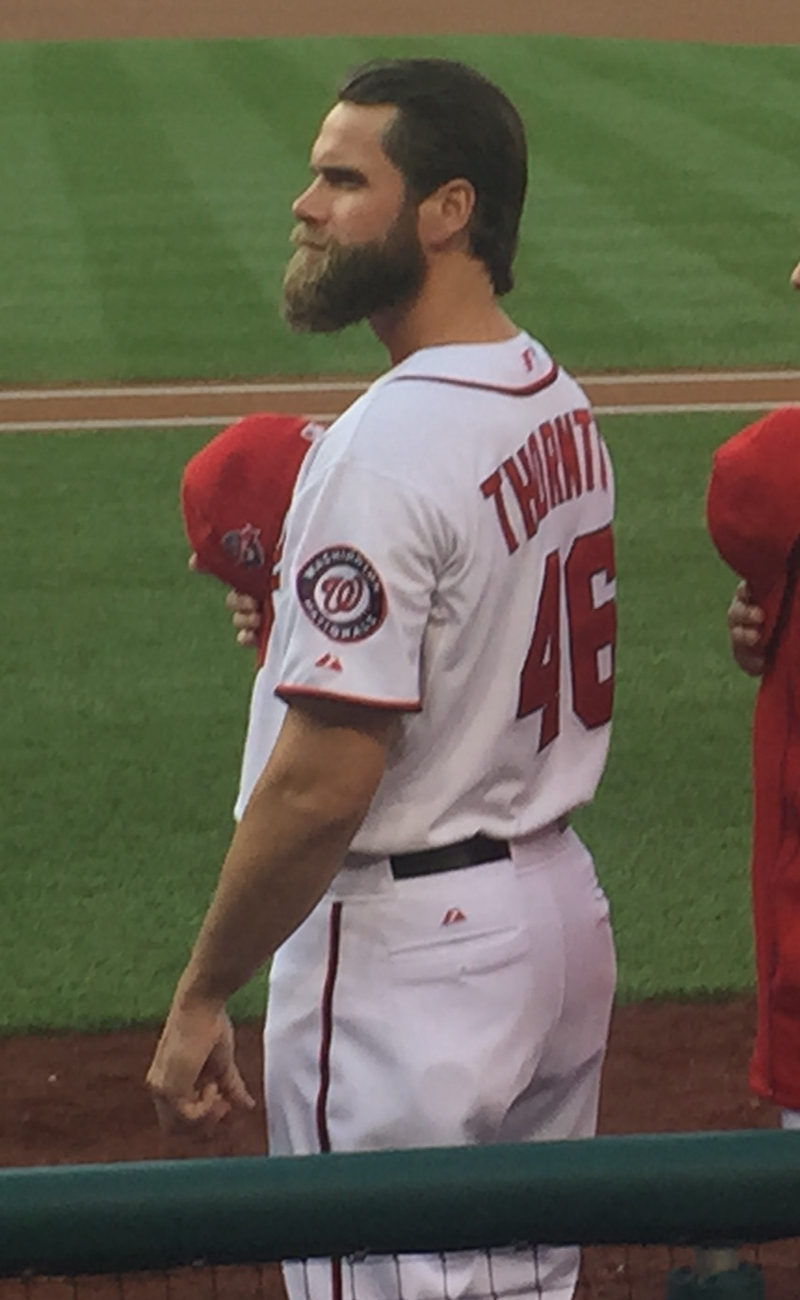
Thornton during his tenure with the Washington Nationals in 2015

On January 10, 2014, Thornton signed a two-year contract with the New York Yankees worth $7 million. In 46 games for the Yankees, Thornton was 0–3 with a 2.55 ERA. He was put on waivers late in the season in what General Manager Brian Cashman said was a move for "roster flexibility".

In 2014, Thornton reached second on the all-time list for holds in Major League Baseball, trailing only Arthur Rhodes.

=== Washington Nationals ===
On August 5, 2014, Thornton was claimed off waivers by the Washington Nationals. He pitched in 18 games for Washington down the stretch, going 1–0 and posting a perfect 0.00 ERA. Thornton appeared in three games in the 2014 National League Division Series against the San Francisco Giants, going 0–1 with a 3.86 ERA. Thornton made 60 appearances for Washington in 2015, compiling a 2–1 record and a 2.18 ERA with 23 strikeouts in 41 1/3 innings. Since 2005, Thornton had recorded the most innings of any left-handed reliever. He became a free agent following the 2015 season.

=== San Diego Padres ===
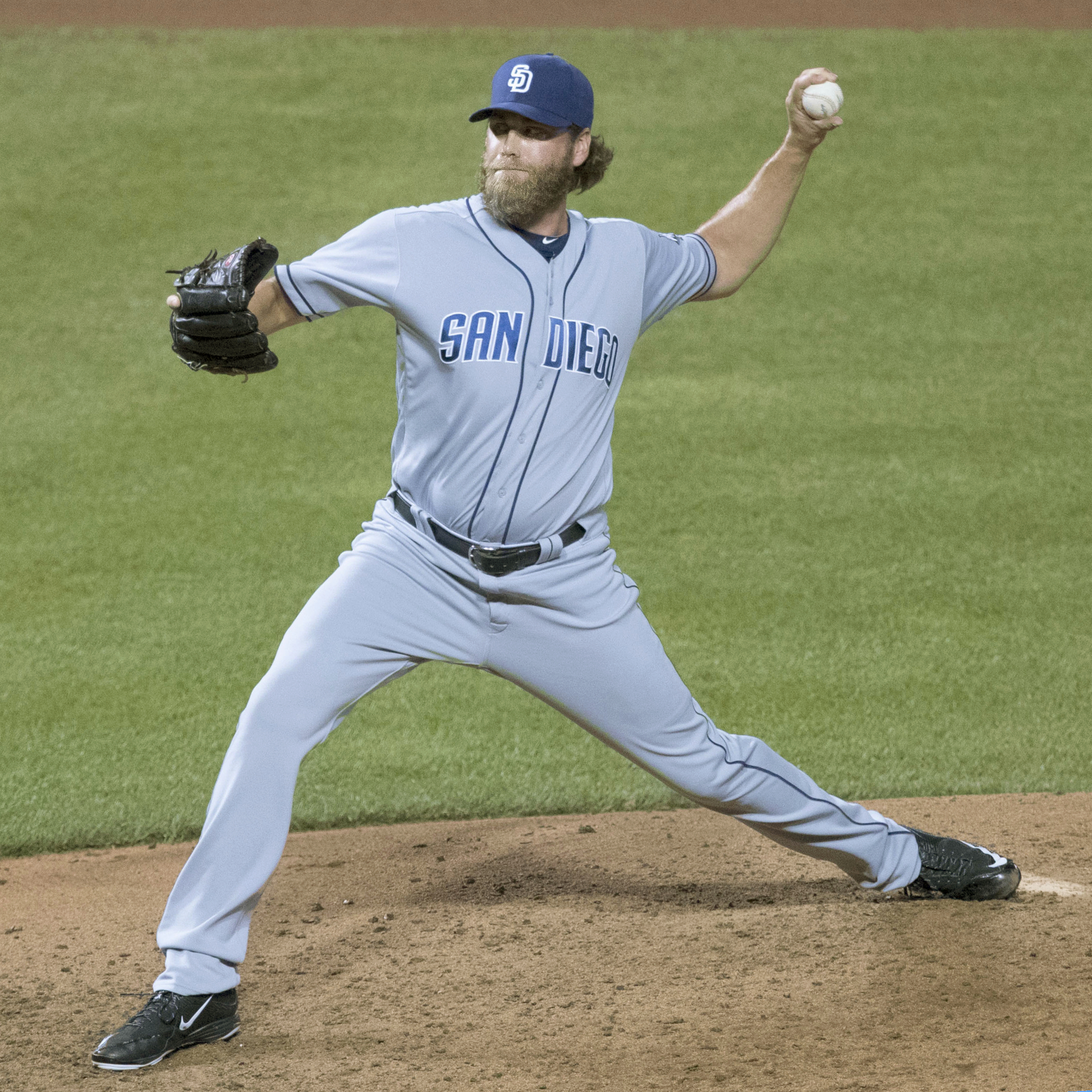
Thornton with the San Diego Padres in 2016.

On March 3, 2016, Thornton signed a minor league deal with the San Diego Padres with an invitation to Spring training. He had his contract selected to the major league roster on April 3. He was designated for assignment on August 6, 2016. He cleared waivers and was released on August 11.

=== Retirement ===
On November 8, 2016, Thornton announced his retirement from professional baseball.

== Pitching style ==
Since joining the White Sox bullpen, Thornton mostly scrapped his secondary pitches and now relies heavily on a mid- to upper-90s four-seam fastball. In 2010, Thornton threw his fastball on 90.1 percent of his pitches, and at least 80 percent of the time in five other seasons. He also occasionally throws a slider, which he uses most effectively against right-handed batters. While he struggled with control in Seattle, walking more than 16 percent of batters faced, he improved his command starting in Chicago, with a career 9 percent walk rate.
