= Dewon Day =

American baseball player (born 1980)

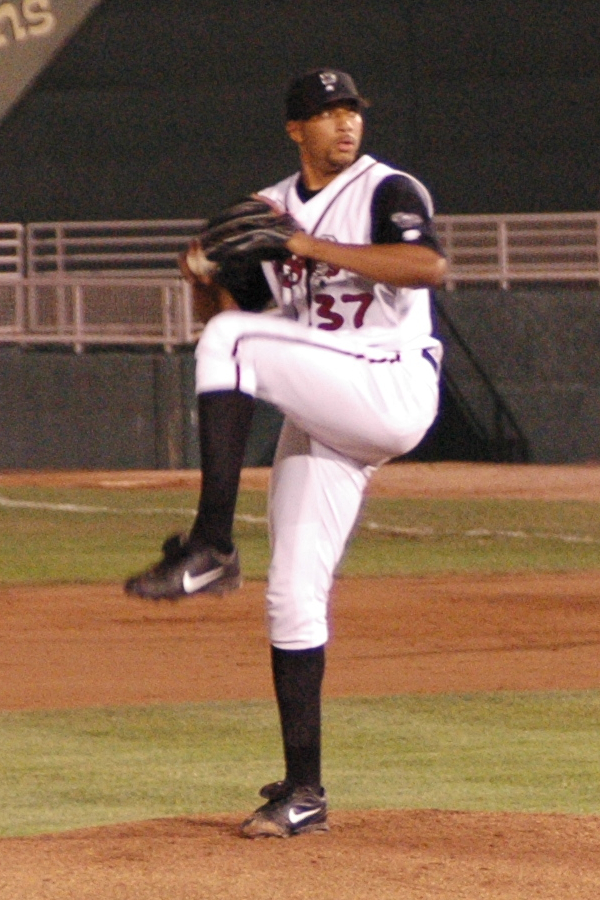
- Day pitching for the Lansing Lugnuts in 2005
- Relief pitcher
- Born: September 29, 1980 (age 45); Jackson, Mississippi, U.S.
- Batted: Right Threw: Right

MLB debut
- May 28, 2007, for the Chicago White Sox

Last MLB appearance
- July 23, 2007, for the Chicago White Sox

MLB statistics
- Win–loss record: 0-1
- Earned run average: 11.25
- Strikeouts: 7
- Stats at Baseball Reference

Teams
- Chicago White Sox (2007)

Amos Dewon Day (born September 29, 1980) is an American former Major League Baseball relief pitcher who was drafted by the Toronto Blue Jays. He was then taken by the White Sox via the Rule 5 draft in 2005. He had two brief stints with the Chicago White Sox in 2007, sandwiched around a trip to the disabled list. Day appeared in 13 games over a two-month span in which he often struggled, posting an ERA of 11.25 and recording more walks than strikeouts.

Day was claimed off waivers by the Red Sox after the 2008 season. He was later claimed off waivers again, this time by the Tampa Bay Rays. Day was released by the Rays organization. On July 3, 2009, Day was signed to a minor league contract by the Oakland Athletics on July 11. In 2010, he signed to play for the Newark Bears of the Atlantic League.

Day attended Southern University.

== Personal ==
Dewon is currently living in New Jersey working as a Sales Representative for Nike Golf.
