= Heath Phillips =

American baseball player (born 1982)

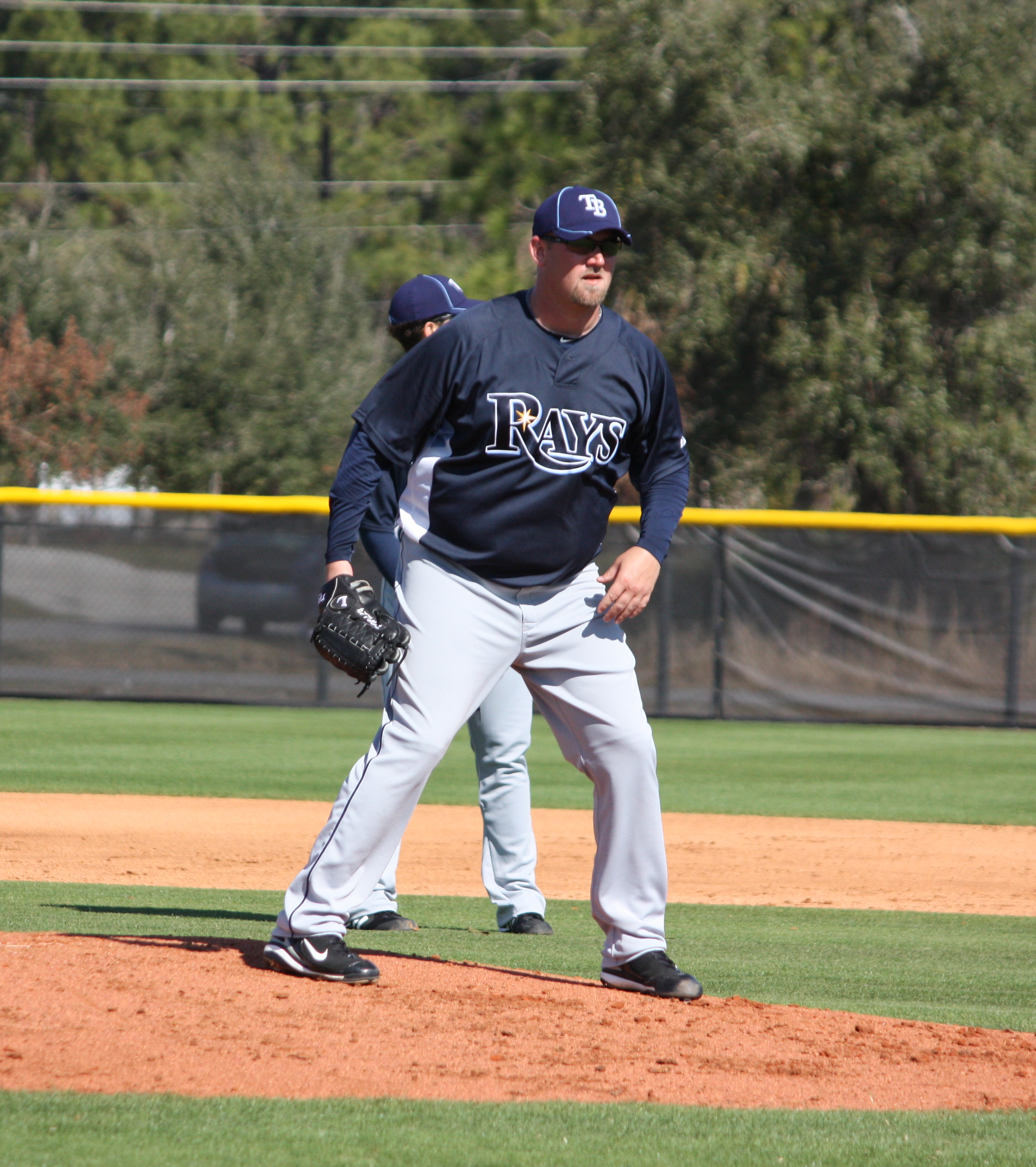
- Pitcher
- Born: March 24, 1982 (age 43); Evansville, Indiana
- Batted: Left Threw: Left

MLB debut
- September 5, 2007, for the Chicago White Sox

Last MLB appearance
- September 30, 2007, for the Chicago White Sox

MLB statistics
- Win–loss record: 1–1
- Earned run average: 3.68
- Strikeouts: 2
- Stats at Baseball Reference

Teams
- Chicago White Sox (2007)

Heath Michael Phillips (born March 24, 1982) is an American former professional baseball player and coach. He played in Major League Baseball as a left-handed pitcher for the Chicago White Sox in 2007. Heath is a coach in the prestigious Scorpions Baseball Travel Program and is the pitching coach for Shorter University in Georgia.

== Education ==
He graduated from Evansville Central High School in 2000. He attended Lake City Community College in Florida.

In college, he went 7–6 with a 3.09 ERA and 117 strikeouts in 2001. As a designated hitter, he batted .324 with 6 home runs and led the state in doubles (24) and RBI (68).

== Draft and minor leagues ==
He was selected by the Chicago White Sox in the 2000 Major League Baseball draft in the 10th round as the 292nd overall pick. He did not sign with the White Sox until May 12, 2001.

In 2006, Phillips played the whole season with the Triple-A Charlotte Knights. He was named the International League Most Valuable Pitcher after going 13–5 with a 2.96 ERA. Heath was a member of the Team USA Olympic Qualifier 2006 team that won gold in Cuba. His teammates included Billy Butler, Kurt Suzuki, Michael Bourn, Mark Reynolds and was managed by Davey Johnson.

In 2007, Phillips began the year at Charlotte again. He finished the season going 13–7 with a 4.30 ERA in 28 starts. He was rewarded with a September callup after the minor league season was over when rosters expanded.

== Major league career ==
In Phillips' first two major league games, which were relief appearances, he got a win and a loss. Phillips made his major league debut on September 5, 2007, against the Detroit Tigers. He got the loss against the Tigers when he came into the game in the bottom of the 11th inning. He had two outs when he gave up the game winning single to Timo Pérez. In his second career game, on September 7, Phillips got the win against the Minnesota Twins. He had once again pitched in the extra innings, this time coming into the game in the top of the 13th inning. He pitched just that inning as the White Sox won the game in the bottom of the 13th inning.

On January 5, 2008, he signed a minor league deal with the New York Yankees. He was released by the Yankees on July 19, 2008. On July 29, 2008, Phillips signed a minor league contract with the Tampa Bay Rays and became a free agent at the end of the season. On December 17, 2008, he signed a minor league contract with the Kansas City Royals.

Phillips finished his career by playing in the Atlantic League of Professional Baseball for the Long Island Ducks in 2011 and the Sugar Land Skeeters in 2012.
