= Donny Lucy =

American baseball player (born 1982)

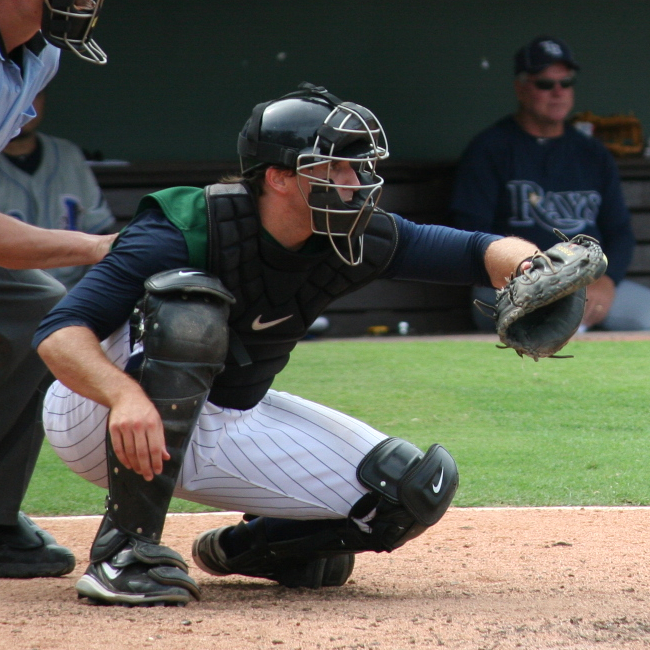
- Lucy with the Charlotte Knights in 2010
- Catcher
- Born: August 8, 1982 (age 43); Escondido, California, U.S.
- Batted: Right Threw: Right

MLB debut
- September 5, 2007, for the Chicago White Sox

Last MLB appearance
- September 28, 2011, for the Chicago White Sox

MLB statistics
- Batting average: .250
- Home runs: 1
- Runs batted in: 3
- Stats at Baseball Reference

Teams
- Chicago White Sox (2007, 2010–2011)

Donald Hassett Lucy (born August 8, 1982) is a former Major League Baseball catcher. During his career, he appeared on three brief stints with the Chicago White Sox.

== High School and College ==
Donny attended Fallbrook Union High School in San Diego, California. He was named the 2001 San Diego County Male Athlete of the Year. He was a catcher and an infielder in baseball and was a running back and a linebacker in football. After graduating from high school, he attended Stanford University. In 2002 and 2003, he played collegiate summer baseball with the Hyannis Mets of the Cape Cod Baseball League. In his junior year, he was All-Pac-10 when he hit .313 with 12 home runs and 47 RBIs in 56 games. After his junior year, he was selected by the Chicago White Sox in the 2nd round (59th overall) in the 2004 Major League Baseball draft.

== Professional career ==
He began his professional career for the White Sox with the White Sox Rookie League in 2004. He hit .239 in 50 games at the rookie level. In 2005, he played for the Single-A Kannapolis Intimidators. In 2006, he began playing for the High Single-A Winston-Salem Warthogs. After 97 games in which he hit .262, he was promoted to the Double-A Birmingham Barons on August 13. He played in 18 games at the Double-A level in which he batted .283.

Donny played at the Double-A and Triple-A level in 2007. He was promoted to the majors on September 1, when rosters expanded.

On September 5, 2007, Lucy made his major league debut when he started behind the plate. He got his first major league hit, which was a single, off Detroit Tigers pitcher Kenny Rogers.

Lucy made the White Sox opening day roster for the 2010 season after backup catcher Ramón Castro bruised his heel in a spring training game and was placed on the DL. Lucy hit his first home run, a solo shot, on April 15, 2010 off Toronto Blue Jays starting pitcher Dana Eveland. It was also his first run batted in. On May 3, 2010 Donny was optioned to the White Sox Triple-A team, Charlotte Knights, due to Ramon Castro being activated from the 15-day disabled list.

On November 5, 2010, Donny was granted free agency.

During the 2010-2011 offseason, Lucy signed a minor league contract with the White Sox.

On August 16, 2011, Donny was called back up to the White Sox.

On December 16, Donny Lucy announced his retirement from Major League Baseball being one of 6,500 people to ever hit a homerun in the major leagues.
