= Andrew Sisco =

American baseball player (born 1983)

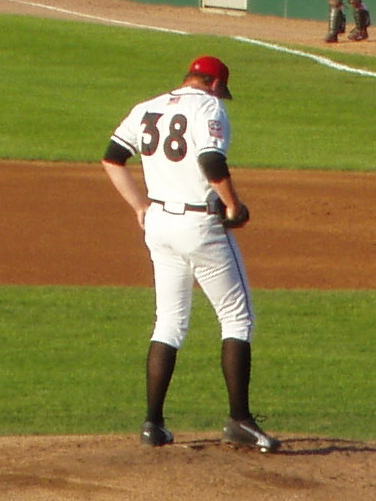
- Sisco with the Lansing Lugnuts in 2003
- Pitcher
- Born: January 13, 1983 (age 43); Steamboat Springs, Colorado, U.S.
- Batted: Left Threw: Left

Professional debut
- MLB: April 4, 2005, for the Kansas City Royals
- CPBL: March 31, 2013, for the EDA Rhinos
- KBO: March 29, 2015, for the KT Wiz

Last appearance
- MLB: May 27, 2007, for the Chicago White Sox
- KBO: May 24, 2015, for the KT Wiz
- CPBL: June 25, 2016, for the Brother Elephants

MLB statistics
- Win–loss record: 3–9
- Earned run average: 5.18
- Strikeouts: 141

CPBL statistics
- Win–loss record: 25–20
- Earned run average: 3.73
- Strikeouts: 385

KBO statistics
- Win–loss record: 0–6
- Earned run average: 6.23
- Strikeouts: 42
- Stats at Baseball Reference

Teams
- Kansas City Royals (2005–2006); Chicago White Sox (2007); EDA Rhinos (2013–2014); KT Wiz (2015); EDA Rhinos (2015–2016); Brother Elephants (2016)

Andrew Frank Sisco (born January 13, 1983) is an American former professional baseball pitcher. He has played in Major League Baseball for the Kansas City Royals and Chicago White Sox, in the Korean Professional Baseball League for the KT Wiz, and in the Chinese Professional Baseball League for the EDA Rhinos and the Brother Elephants. During the summer of 2023, he also served as the pitching coach for the amateur summer baseball team the DubSea Fish Sticks, located in White Center, Washington.

== Professional career ==
=== Kansas City Royals ===
Sisco was the Chicago Cubs second-round pick in the 2001 Major League Baseball draft. He was selected to the Northwest League all-star team and short season A All-Star team as well as being named the short season player of the year, in 2002 with the Boise Hawks, when he was 7–2 with a 2.43 ERA in 14 starts.

Sisco was the second pick in the 2004 Rule 5 draft, taken by the Kansas City Royals from the Cubs organization. The Royals converted him to a relief pitcher. He made his Major League debut on April 4, 2005 against the Detroit Tigers, allowing two runs in 2 innings. Under the terms of Rule 5, Sisco remained on the Royals major league roster for the entire 2005 season so that he would not have to be offered back to the Cubs for $50,000. Sisco posted a 3.11 ERA in his rookie season for the Royals, but after struggling during the 2006 season, the Royals sent Sisco to Triple-A Omaha. They recalled him to Kansas City on August 8. His ERA rose to 7.10 in 2006.

=== Chicago White Sox ===
On December 16, 2006, Sisco was traded to the Chicago White Sox for Ross Gload. He appeared in 19 games for the White Sox, with an 8.36 ERA in 2007 and also made 23 appearances (15 starts) for the AAA Charlotte Knights.

=== Oakland Athletics ===
Following Tommy John surgery, Sisco was signed by the Oakland Athletics to a $550,000 minor-league contract in March 2009. Due to his lengthy recovery from the injury, he did not play in a game for the Athletics.

=== San Francisco Giants ===
On March 6, 2010, Sisco signed a minor league contract with the San Francisco Giants. He appeared in 48 games with the AA Richmond Flying Squirrels, where he was 4–4 with a 4.32 ERA.

=== New York Yankees ===
Sisco signed a minor league contract with an invitation to 2011 spring training with the New York Yankees. However, he did not make the team out of spring training. On May 27, Sisco was released after he had a 2–0 record and a 1.88 ERA in 16 games with the Scranton/Wilkes-Barre Yankees of the International League. He finished the season with the Piratas de Campeche in the Mexican Baseball League, where he was 1–2 with an 8.27 ERA with 10 appearances.

=== Los Angeles Dodgers ===
The Los Angeles Dodgers signed Sisco to a minor league contract on February 9, 2012.

=== EDA Rhinos ===
In 2013, Sisco played the first half-season for the EDA Rhinos of Taiwan's Chinese Professional Baseball League, where he was primarily used as a starting pitcher. Despite only playing for the first half, Sisco led the league in ERA with 2.70 in 133 and 1/3 innings.

In 2014, Sisco returned to the Rhinos with a one-year contract. That year, Sisco set the CPBL record for most strikeouts through a players first eight starts, with 67.

=== KT Wiz ===
Sisco signed with the KT Wiz of the Korea Baseball Organization for the 2015 season. On May 27, 2015, Sisco was released after struggling to a 0-6 record with a 6.23 in 39 innings with the club.

=== EDA Rhinos (second stint) ===
Sisco re-signed with the EDA Rhinos of the Chinese Professional Baseball League following his release from Korea. In 17 starts, Sisco got 6 wins, 7 losses and a 4.52 ERA.

=== Chinatrust Brothers ===
On March 29, 2016, Sisco signed with the Chinatrust Brothers of the CPBL. After a short stint in the farm league, Sisco was promoted to the active roster.

== See also ==
- Rule 5 draft results
