= Danny Richar =

Dominican baseball player (born 1983)

- Second baseman
- Born: June 9, 1983 (age 43); La Romana, Dominican Republic
- Batted: Left Threw: Right

MLB debut
- July 28, 2007, for the Chicago White Sox

Last MLB appearance
- July 2, 2009, for the Cincinnati Reds

MLB statistics
- Batting average: .229
- Home runs: 6
- Runs batted in: 18
- Stats at Baseball Reference

Teams
- Chicago White Sox (2007); Cincinnati Reds (2008–2009)

Danny Adam Richar (born June 9, 1983) is a Dominican former professional baseball second baseman. He played in Major League Baseball for the Chicago White Sox and Cincinnati Reds, Richar had a .229 batting average, six home runs, and 18 runs batted in.

== Career ==
Richar originally signed as an undrafted free agent with the Arizona Diamondbacks on July 9, 2001. He played for the Single-A Lancaster JetHawks from 2003 (first professional season) to 2005 including 26 games for the Double-A El Paso Diablos in 2004. He had his most home runs as a minor leaguer with 20 in 2005.

On June 16, 2007, he was traded to the Chicago White Sox for outfield prospect Aaron Cunningham. He hit .346 with 5 home runs in 32 games for the White Sox Triple-A team, the Charlotte Knights, before being recalled by the big league club on July 28, 2007, after second baseman Tadahito Iguchi was traded to the Philadelphia Phillies.

On September 16, 2007, when the Chicago White Sox were playing the Los Angeles Angels, Richar hit a game-tying two-run homer in the eighth inning. His home run made it possible for up Hall of Famer. His home run preceded Hall Of Famer Jim Thome's 500th career home run.

On July 31, 2008, Richar along with pitcher Nick Masset were traded for outfielder Ken Griffey Jr. of the Cincinnati Reds.

On November 4, 2009, Richar filed for free agency. He signed a minor league contract with the Florida Marlins on December 21, and spent the 2010 season with their triple-A affiliate, the New Orleans Zephyrs, where he batted .315 in 128 games. He played in 2011 for the Camden Riversharks organization of the Atlantic League of Professional Baseball.

Richar signed with the Kansas City T-Bones of the American Association of Independent Professional Baseball and played for them during the 2014 season.

On May 2, 2016, Richar was traded to the Toros de Tijuana of the Mexican Baseball League. He became a free agent after the 2016 season.

On March 21, 2017, Richar signed with the New Jersey Jackals of the Can-Am League. He was released on May 6, 2017.

On February 13, 2018, Richar signed with the Road Warriors of the Atlantic League of Professional Baseball. He was released on May 1, 2018.
