= 2006 Oakland Athletics season =

2006 Oakland Athletics
- American League West champions
- League: American League
- Division: West
- Ballpark: McAfee Coliseum
- City: Oakland, California
- Record: 93–69 (.574)
- Divisional place: 1st
- Owners: Lewis Wolff
- General managers: Billy Beane
- Managers: Ken Macha
- Television: KICU-TV; FSN Bay Area (Ray Fosse, Glen Kuiper)
- Radio: KYCY; KNTS (Ray Fosse, Ken Korach, Vince Cotroneo)

The Oakland Athletics' 2006 season was their 39th in Oakland, California. It was also the 106th season in franchise history. The team finished first in the American League West with a record of 93–69.

The Athletics won their division (and reached the postseason) for the first time since 2003. The team was led, in large part, by eventual Hall-of-Famer Frank Thomas. Thomas, who was signed to a one-year contract in the offseason, hit a team-high 39 home runs over the course of the season. He ultimately finished fourth in American League MVP voting.

The Athletics managed to sweep the Minnesota Twins in the first round of the playoffs. In doing so, they advanced to the American League Championship Series for the first time since 1992. The sweep was Oakland's first playoff series victory since 1990. It stood as the only playoff series victory during the Billy Beane era until 2020. The Athletics would themselves be swept, 4 games to 0, by the Detroit Tigers in the ALCS.

The team saw a number of key departures at the end of the season. Free agent pitcher Barry Zito, the team's lone All-Star in 2006, signed with the rival San Francisco Giants following the team's ALCS loss. Additionally, Frank Thomas signed a two-year deal with the Toronto Blue Jays. The coaching staff experienced similar turnover, as manager Ken Macha and longtime third base coach Ron Washington departed. Macha was fired at seasons' end; Washington, by contrast, was hired to manage the division rival Texas Rangers. They would be replaced by Bob Geren and Rene Lachemann, respectively.

== Offseason ==
- November 29, 2005: Esteban Loaiza was signed as a free agent with the Oakland Athletics.
- December 9, 2005: Scott McClain was signed as a free agent with the Oakland Athletics.
- December 13, 2005: Milton Bradley was traded by the Los Angeles Dodgers with Antonio Perez to the Oakland Athletics for Andre Ethier.
- January 31, 2006: Frank Thomas signed as a free agent.

== Regular season ==
=== Season standings ===
AL West
Team	W	L	Pct.	GB	Home	Road
Oakland Athletics	93	69	.574	—	49‍–‍32	44‍–‍37
Los Angeles Angels of Anaheim	89	73	.549	4	45‍–‍36	44‍–‍37
Texas Rangers	80	82	.494	13	39‍–‍42	41‍–‍40
Seattle Mariners	78	84	.481	15	44‍–‍37	34‍–‍47

=== Record vs. opponents ===
2006 American League record Source: MLB Standings Grid – 2006
Team	BAL	BOS	CWS	CLE	DET	KC	LAA	MIN	NYY	OAK	SEA	TB	TEX	TOR	NL
Baltimore	—	3–15	2–5	4–2	3–3	5–1	4–6	3–6	7–12	2–4	4–6	13–6	3–6	8–11	9–9
Boston	15–3	—	4–2	3–4	3–3	4–5	3–3	1–5	8–11	3–7	4–6	10–9	5–4	7–12	16–2
Chicago	5–2	2–4	—	8–11	12–7	11–8	6–3	9–10	2–4	3–3	5–4	3–3	5–5	5–4	14–4
Cleveland	2–4	4–3	11–8	—	6–13	10–8	4–5	8–11	3–4	3–6	4–5	6–1	5–4	4–2	8–10
Detroit	3–3	3–3	7–12	13–6	—	14–4	3–5	11–8	2–5	5–4	6–3	5–3	5–5	3–3	15–3
Kansas City	1–5	5–4	8–11	8–10	4–14	—	3–7	7–12	2–7	4–5	3–5	1–5	3–3	3–4	10–8
Los Angeles	6–4	3–3	3–6	5–4	5–3	7–3	—	4–2	6–4	11–8	10–9	7–2	11–8	4–6	7–11
Minnesota	6–3	5–1	10–9	11–8	8–11	12–7	2–4	—	3–3	6–4	5–3	6–1	4–5	2–5	16–2
New York	12–7	11–8	4–2	4–3	5–2	7–2	4–6	3–3	—	3–6	3–3	13–5	8–2	10–8	10–8
Oakland	4–2	7–3	3–3	6–3	4–5	5–4	8–11	4–6	6–3	—	17–2	6–3	9–10	6–4	8–10
Seattle	6–4	6–4	4–5	5–4	3–6	5–3	9–10	3–5	3–3	2–17	—	6–3	8–11	4–5	14–4
Tampa Bay	6–13	9–10	3–3	1–6	3–5	5–1	2–7	1–6	5–13	3–6	3–6	—	3–6	6–12	11–7
Texas	6–3	4–5	5–5	4–5	5–5	3–3	8–11	5–4	2–8	10–9	11–8	6–3	—	4–2	7–11
Toronto	11–8	12–7	4–5	2–4	3–3	4–3	6–4	5–2	8–10	4–6	5–4	12–6	2–4	—	9–9

=== Game log ===
2006 game log
April

#	Date	Opponent	Score	Win	Loss	Save	Attendance	Record
1	April 3	Yankees	2-15	Johnson (1-0)	Zito (0-1)	–	35,077	0-1
2	April 4	Yankees	4-3	Street (1-0)	Proctor (0-1)	–	31,284	1-1
3	April 5	Yankees	9-4	Kennedy (1-0)	Wright (0-1)	–	30,165	2-1
4	April 6	@ Mariners	2-6	Meche (1-0)	Loaiza (0-1)	Putz (1)	22,701	2-2
5	April 7	@ Mariners	5-0	Blanton (1-0)	Hernández (0-1)	–	30,612	3-2
6	April 8	@ Mariners	3-0	Zito (1-1)	Moyer (0-1)	Street (1)	37,904	4-2
7	April 9	@ Mariners	6-4	Harden (1-0)	Piñeiro (1-1)	Street (2)	27,139	5-2
8	April 11	@ Twins	6-7	Radke (2-0)	Haren (0-1)	Nathan (1)	48,911	5-3
9	April 12	@ Twins	5-6	Silva (1-1)	Loaiza (0-2)	Nathan (2)	22,603	5-4
10	April 13	@ Twins	2-8	Lohse (1-1)	Blanton (1-1)	–	13,520	5-5
11	April 14	Rangers	3-6	Millwood (1-2)	Zito (1-2)	–	14,049	5-6
12	April 15	Rangers	5-4	Harden (2-0)	Padilla (2-1)	Street (3)	16,186	6-6
13	April 16	Rangers	3-5	Cordero (1-1)	Street (1-1)	–	21,256	6-7
14	April 18	Tigers	4-3	Duchscherer (1-0)	Verlander (1-2)	Street (4)	16,857	7-7
15	April 19	Tigers	4-11	Rogers (3-1)	Blanton (1-2)	–	18,309	7-8
16	April 20	Tigers	3-4	Rodney (1-0)	Duchscherer (1-1)	–	15,489	7-9
17	April 21	Angels	5-3	Harden (3-0)	Romero (1-2)	Calero (1)	19,874	8-9
18	April 22	Angels	4-5	Weaver (1-2)	Haren (0-2)	F. Rodríguez (6)	22,670	8-10
19	April 23	Angels	3-4	Escobar (3-1)	Loaiza (0-3)	F. Rodríguez (7)	27,104	8-11
20	April 24	@ Rangers	3-2	Blanton (2-2)	Wilson (1-1)	Duchscherer (1)	23,802	9-11
21	April 25	@ Rangers	5-6	Cordero (3-2)	Gaudin (0-1)	–	25,492	9-12
22	April 26	@ Rangers	6-4 (10)	Duchscherer (2-1)	Wilson (1-2)	Kennedy (1)	23,756	10-12
23	April 28	@ Royals	5-3	Haren (1-2)	Mays (0-3)	Saarloos (1)	12,203	11-12
---	April 29	@ Royals	Postponed (rain) Rescheduled for August 18					11-12
24	April 30	@ Royals	13-6	Blanton (3-2)	Hudson (0-3)	–	15,224	12-12

May

#	Date	Opponent	Score	Win	Loss	Save	Attendance	Record
25	May 1	@ Angels	1-0	Zito (2-2)	Carrasco (0-2)	Duchscherer (2)	41,721	13-12
26	May 2	@ Angels	10-3	Halsey (1-0)	Lackey (3-2)	–	35,943	14-12
27	May 3	Indians	3-14	Byrd (4-2)	Haren (1-3)	–	18,248	14-13
28	May 4	Indians	12-4	Saarloos (1-0)	Johnson (2-2)	Gaudin (1)	14,695	15-13
29	May 5	Devil Rays	1-3	Kazmir (4-2)	Blanton (3-3)	Walker (2)	12,552	15-14
30	May 6	Devil Rays	3-2	Kennedy (2-0)	Orvella (1-3)	–	25,080	16-14
31	May 7	Devil Rays	2-3	Hendrickson (2-2)	Halsey (1-1)	Walker (3)	22,837	16-15
32	May 9	@ Blue Jays	6-5	Haren (2-3)	Towers (0-7)	Street (5)	36,269	17-15
33	May 10	@ Blue Jays	7-9	Rosario (1-0)	Blanton (3-4)	Ryan (8)	19,269	17-16
34	May 11	@ Blue Jays	3-8	Lilly (4-2)	Saarloos (1-1)	–	23,974	17-17
35	May 12	@ Yankees	0-2	Wang (3-1)	Zito (2-3)	Rivera (7)	47,497	17-18
36	May 13	@ Yankees	3-4	Wright (1-2)	Halsey (1-2)	Farnsworth (1)	53,907	17-19
37	May 14	@ Yankees	6-1	Haren (3-3)	Johnson (5-4)	–	52,587	18-19
38	May 16	Mariners	12-6	Blanton (4-4)	Hernández (3-5)	–	16,397	19-19
39	May 17	Mariners	7-2	Zito (3-3)	Moyer (1-4)	–	19,208	20-19
40	May 18	Mariners	6-3	Saarloos (2-1)	Piñeiro (4-4)	Street (6)	18,136	21-19
41	May 19	Giants	1-0	Haren (4-3)	Lowry (1-1)	Street (7)	35,077	22-19
42	May 20	Giants	2-4 (10)	Benítez (3-0)	Calero (0-1)	–	35,077	22-20
43	May 21	Giants	0-6	Cain (2-5)	Blanton (4-5)	–	35,077	22-21
44	May 22	@ White Sox	4-5 (10)	Jenks (2-1)	Flores (0-1)	–	39,354	22-22
45	May 23	@ White Sox	3-9	Vázquez (5-3)	Saarloos (2-2)	–	38,860	22-23
46	May 24	@ White Sox	2-3	Buehrle (6-2)	Haren (4-4)	Jenks (13)	38,434	22-24
47	May 25	@ Rangers	7-8	Otsuka (1-1)	Street (1-2)	–	22,006	22-25
48	May 26	@ Rangers	3-5	Cordero (4-3)	Gaudin (0-2)	Otsuka (7)	27,791	22-26
49	May 27	@ Rangers	6-3	Zito (4-3)	Loe (3-5)	Street (8)	41,226	23-26
50	May 28	@ Rangers	3-4	Padilla (5-3)	Saarloos (2-3)	Otsuka (8)	38,905	23-27
51	May 29	Royals	4-6	Etherton (1-0)	Haren (4-5)	Burgos (6)	28,040	23-28
52	May 30	Royals	7-8 (10)	Dessens (3-5)	Roney (0-1)	Burgos (7)	12,516	23-29
53	May 31	Royals	7-0	Blanton (5-5)	Elarton (1-6)	–	25,181	24-29

June

#	Date	Opponent	Score	Win	Loss	Save	Attendance	Record
54	June 1	Twins	4-0	Zito (5-3)	Bonser (1-1)	–	12,025	25-29
55	June 2	Twins	1-2	Santana (5-4)	Saarloos (2-4)	Nathan (7)	16,138	25-30
56	June 3	Twins	2-1	Halsey (2-2)	Radke (4-7)	Street (9)	23,194	26-30
57	June 4	Twins	5-1	Halsey (3-2)	Silva (2-7)	–	25,247	27-30
58	June 6	@ Indians	7-6	Zito (6-3)	Betancourt (0-1)	Street (10)	17,340	28-30
59	June 7	@ Indians	2-11	Byrd (5-4)	Blanton (5-6)	–	20,311	28-31
60	June 8	@ Indians	4-1	Loaiza (1-3)	Johnson (3-6)	Street (11)	21,099	29-31
61	June 9	@ Yankees	6-5	Haren (5-5)	Johnson (7-5)	Street (12)	53,837	30-31
62	June 10	@ Yankees	5-2	Saarloos (3-4)	Mussina (8-2)	Street (13)	53,779	31-31
63	June 11	@ Yankees	6-5	Zito (7-3)	Kyle Farnsworth (2-4)	Street (14)	54,570	32-31
64	June 13	Mariners	2-0	Blanton (6-6)	Moyer (3-6)	Street (15)	15,216	33-31
65	June 14	Mariners	7-2	Haren (6-5)	Piñeiro (5-7)	–	20,550	34-31
66	June 15	Mariners	9-6	Loaiza (2-3)	Washburn (4-8)	Street (16)	16,563	35-31
67	June 16	Dodgers	7-3	Zito (8-3)	Tomko (5-6)	–	30,161	36-31
68	June 17	Dodgers	5-4 (17)	Karsay (1-0)	Seo (2-4)	–	35,077	37-31
69	June 18	Dodgers	5-2	Blanton (7-6)	Sele (3-2)	Street (17)	35,077	38-31
70	June 19	@ Rockies	0-7	Kim (4-4)	Haren (6-6)	–	21,964	38-32
71	June 20	@ Rockies	0-6	Jennings (6-6)	Loaiza (2-4)	–	21,753	38-33
72	June 21	@ Rockies	3-2 (11)	Calero (1-1)	King (1-3)	–	26,489	39-33
73	June 23	@ Giants	4-3	Calero (2-1)	Benítez (4-1)	Street (18)	42,948	40-33
74	June 24	@ Giants	7-8	Worrell (3-2)	Street (1-3)	–	42,866	40-34
75	June 25	@ Giants	10-4	Loaiza (3-4)	Cain (6-6)	–	42,414	41-34
76	June 27	@ Padres	0-3	Young (7-3)	Zito (8-4)	Hoffman (19)	34,102	41-35
77	June 28	@ Padres	1-8	Hensley (5-6)	Blanton (7-7)	–	39,874	41-36
78	June 29	@ Padres	6-5 (14)	Flores (1-1)	Cassidy (4-4)	Gaudin (2)	30,301	42-36
79	June 30	Diamondbacks	4-6	Vargas (7-4)	Halsey (3-3)	Julio (7)	16,756	42-37

July

#	Date	Opponent	Score	Win	Loss	Save	Attendance	Record
80	July 1	Diamondbacks	2-7	Batista (8-5)	Loaiza (3-5)	–	19,024	42-38
81	July 2	Diamondbacks	1-3	Webb (9-3)	Zito (8-5)	–	19,130	42-39
82	July 3	Tigers	5-3	Blanton (8-7)	Robertson (8-4)	Street (19)	35,077	43-39
83	July 4	Tigers	2-1 (10)	Gaudin (1-2)	Rodney (4-3)	–	21,096	44-39
84	July 5	Tigers	4-10	Rogers (11-3)	Saarloos (3-5)	Colón (1)	22,210	44-40
85	July 6	Angels	7-5	Street (2-3)	Shields (4-6)	–	14,673	45-40
86	July 7	Angels	0-3	Lackey (7-5)	Zito (8-6)	–	20,711	45-41
87	July 8	Angels	4-6	Weaver (6-0)	Blanton (8-8)	F. Rodríguez (20)	25,289	45-42
88	July 9	Angels	2-4	Santana (10-3)	Haren (6-7)	F. Rodríguez (21)	26,603	45-43
89	July 13	@ Red Sox	5-4 (11)	Street (3-3)	Tavárez (1-3)	Saarloos (2)	36,141	46-43
90	July 14	@ Red Sox	15-3	Zito (9-6)	Beckett (11-5)	–	36,319	47-43
91	July 15	@ Red Sox	0-7	Schilling (11-3)	Haren (6-8)	–	36,232	47-44
92	July 16	@ Red Sox	8-1	Blanton (9-8)	Snyder (1-1)	–	35,643	48-44
93	July 17	@ Orioles	3-5	Birkins (5-1)	Saarloos (3-6)	Ray (23)	19,652	48-45
94	July 18	@ Orioles	5-4	Loaiza (4-5)	E. Rodríguez (0-1)	Street (20)	20,827	49-45
95	July 19	@ Orioles	5-1	Zito (10-6)	Benson (9-9)	–	29,407	50-45
96	July 21	@ Tigers	4-7	Verlander (12-4)	Haren (6-9)	–	40,687	50-46
97	July 22	@ Tigers	9-5	Blanton (10-8)	Ledezma (1-1)	–	38,923	51-46
98	July 23	@ Tigers	4-8	Robertson (9-6)	Loaiza (4-6)	–	40,355	51-47
99	July 24	Red Sox	3-7	Beckett (13-5)	Zito (10-7)	–	33,370	51-48
100	July 25	Red Sox	5-13	Schilling (13-3)	Windsor (0-1)	–	34,077	51-49
101	July 26	Red Sox	5-1	Haren (7-9)	Snyder (2-2)	–	35,077	52-49
102	July 27	Blue Jays	5-2	Blanton (11-8)	Lilly (9-9)	Street (21)	19,251	53-49
103	July 28	Blue Jays	3-4	Downs (5-1)	Loaiza (4-7)	Ryan (25)	22,217	53-50
104	July 29	Blue Jays	7-4	Zito (11-7)	McGowan (1-1)	Street (22)	25,627	54-50
105	July 30	Blue Jays	6-5	Street (4-3)	Ryan (1-1)	–	29,709	55-50
106	July 31	@ Angels	3-1	Haren (8-9)	Santana (11-5)	–	43,558	56-50

August

#	Date	Opponent	Score	Win	Loss	Save	Attendance	Record
107	August 1	@ Angels	2-3	Saunders (2-0)	Blanton (11-9)	F. Rodríguez (26)	44,111	56-51
108	August 2	@ Angels	3-2	Calero	Shields (6-7)	Street (23)	44,149	57-51
109	August 4	@ Mariners	5-2	Zito (12-7)	Washburn (5-11)	–	44,277	58-51
110	August 5	@ Mariners	5-2	Haren (9-9)	Piñeiro (7-9)	Street (24)	40,115	59-51
111	August 6	@ Mariners	7-6	Blanton (12-9)	Meche (9-6)	Street (25)	37,437	60-51
112	August 7	Rangers	7-4	Loaiza (5-7)	Vólquez (0-1)	Calero (2)	21,208	61-51
113	August 8	Rangers	7-6	Saarloos (4-6)	Millwood (10-8)	Street (26)	21,650	62-51
114	August 9	Rangers	0-14	Padilla (12-7)	Zito (12-8)	–	30,127	62-52
115	August 11	Devil Rays	5-2	Haren (10-9)	Kazmir (10-8)	Street (27)	20,758	63-52
116	August 12	Devil Rays	6-3	Blanton (13-9)	Fossum (6-5)	Street (28)	26,523	64-52
117	August 13	Devil Rays	3-1	Loaiza (6-7)	Corcoran (4-4)	Street (29)	28,692	65-52
118	August 14	Mariners	5-4	Kennedy (3-0)	Soriano (1-2)	Duchscherer (3)	21,859	66-52
119	August 15	Mariners	11-2	Saarloos (5-6)	Piñeiro (7-11)	–	23,726	67-52
120	August 16	Mariners	4-0	Haren (11-9)	Meche (9-8)	–	34,077	68-52
121	August 18	@ Royals	1-7	Hudson (6-4)	Blanton (13-10)	–	n/a	68-53
122	August 18	@ Royals	3-5	Burgos (3-5)	Street (4-4)	Nelson (2)	23,952	68-54
123	August 19	@ Royals	7-2	Zito (13-8)	Redman (7-8)	–	30,810	69-54
124	August 20	@ Royals	6-4	Saarloos (6-6)	Hernández (3-8)	–	16,592	70-54
125	August 21	@ Blue Jays	12-10	Haren (12-9)	League (0-1)	Duchscherer (4)	28,280	71-54
126	August 22	@ Blue Jays	3-4	Burnett (6-5)	Halsey (3-4)	Ryan (28)	30,071	71-55
127	August 23	@ Blue Jays	6-0	Loaiza (7-7)	Chacín (6-3)	–	32,516	72-55
128	August 25	@ Rangers	9-3	Zito (14-8)	Vólquez (1-3)	–	31,178	73-55
129	August 26	@ Rangers	5-3	Blanton (14-10)	Eaton (3-4)	Duchscherer (5)	37,752	74-55
130	August 27	@ Rangers	0-3	Padilla (13-8)	Haren (12-10)	Otsuka (28)	25,708	74-56
131	August 28	Red Sox	9-0	Loaiza (8-7)	Gabbard (0-3)	–	30,159	75-56
132	August 29	Red Sox	2-1	Saarloos (7-6)	Beckett (14-9)	Duchscherer (6)	30,517	76-56
133	August 30	Red Sox	7-2	Zito (15-8)	Schilling (14-7)	–	31,073	77-56

September

#	Date	Opponent	Score	Win	Loss	Save	Attendance	Record
134	September 1	Orioles	5-4	Halsey (4-4)	Williams (2-4)	Duchscherer (7)	31,179	78-56
135	September 2	Orioles	5-6	Loewen (5-4)	Haren (12-11)	Ray (31)	24,383	78-57
136	September 3	Orioles	10-1	Loaiza (9-7)	Penn (0-1)	–	26,280	79-57
137	September 4	Rangers	1-8	Tejeda (4-3)	Zito (15-9)	–	23,949	79-58
138	September 5	Rangers	4-5	Eaton (5-4)	Saarloos (7-7)	Otsuka (31)	27,225	79-59
139	September 6	Rangers	9-6	Blanton (15-10)	Rupe (0-1)	Duchscherer (8)	17,838	80-59
140	September 8	@ Devil Rays	8-6	Haren (13-11)	Shields (6-7)	Street (30)	12,821	81-59
141	September 9	@ Devil Rays	6-9	Miceli (1-1)	Loaiza (9-8)	McClung (6)	22,016	81-60
142	September 10	@ Devil Rays	9-7	Kennedy (4-0)	Camp (7-3)	Street (31)	16,791	82-60
143	September 11	@ Twins	4-9	Silva (9-13)	Blanton (15-11)	Nathan (31)	15,728	82-61
144	September 12	@ Twins	5-7	Reyes (5-0)	Kennedy (4-1)	Nathan (32)	20,991	82-62
145	September 13	@ Twins	1-0	Haren (14-11)	Garza (1-5)	Street (32)	18,902	83-62
146	September 15	White Sox	4-2	Loaiza (10-8)	Garland (17-5)	Street (33)	26,809	84-62
147	September 16	White Sox	7-4	Zito (16-9)	Thornton (5-3)	Street (34)	32,169	85-62
148	September 17	White Sox	5-4	Blanton (16-11)	Contreras (13-8)	Duchscherer (9)	28,806	86-62
149	September 18	Indians	2-7	Westbrook (13-10)	Haren (14-12)	–	17,352	86-63
150	September 19	Indians	7-3	Gaudin (2-2)	Lee (12-11)	–	15,866	87-63
151	September 20	Indians	4-3	Loaiza (11-8)	Cabrera (3-3)	Street (35)	25,131	88-63
152	September 21	Indians	7-4	Gaudin (3-2)	Sabathia (11-11)	Street (36)	20,452	89-63
153	September 22	Angels	5-4 (12)	Halsey (5-4)	F. Rodríguez (2-3)	–	35,077	90-63
154	September 23	Angels	2-6	Lackey (12-11)	Blanton (16-12)	–	34,077	90-64
155	September 24	Angels	1-7	Santana (15-8)	Haren (14-13)	–	34,077	90-65
156	September 25	@ Mariners	9-10 (10)	Putz (4-1)	Calero (3-2)	–	20,982	90-66
157	September 26	@ Mariners	12-3	Harden (4-0)	Woods (6-4)	–	19,604	91-66
158	September 27	@ Mariners	7-6 (10)	Witasick (1-0)	Sherrill (2-4)	Street (37)	23,421	92-66
159	September 28	@ Angels	0-2	Lackey (13-11)	Zito (16-10)	F. Rodríguez (46)	41,944	92-67
160	September 29	@ Angels	0-6	Santana (16-8)	Loaiza (11-9)	–	43,948	92-68
161	September 30	@ Angels	6-7	Carrasco (7-3)	Flores (1-2)	F. Rodríguez (47)	43,944	92-69

October

#	Date	Opponent	Score	Win	Loss	Save	Attendance	Record
162	October 1	@ Angels	11-10	Gaudin (4-2)	Bootcheck (0-1)	Flores (1)	44,107	93-69

=== Roster ===
2006 Oakland Athletics
Roster
Pitchers: 55 Joe Blanton; 50 Kiko Calero; 46 Santiago Casilla; 58 Justin Duchscherer; 47 Ron Flores; 57 Chad Gaudin; 51 Brad Halsey; 40 Rich Harden; 24 Dan Haren; 32 Steve Karsay; 37 Joe Kennedy; 60 Shane Komine; 25 Esteban Loaiza; 52 Matt Roney; 31 Kirk Saarloos; 36,11 Scott Sauerbeck; 20 Huston Street; 61 Jason Windsor; 45 Jay Witasick; 75 Barry Zito	Catchers: 5 Jeremy Brown; 18 Jason Kendall; 17 Adam Melhuse; Infielders: 3 Eric Chavez; 7 Bobby Crosby; 14 Mark Ellis; 12 D'Angelo Jiménez; 29 Dan Johnson; 8 Mark Kiger; 4 Antonio Pérez; 2 Mike Rouse; 19 Marco Scutaro; 33 Nick Swisher	Outfielders: 44 Hiram Bocachica; 22 Milton Bradley; 12 Doug Clark; 23 Bobby Kielty; 21 Mark Kotsay; 16 Jay Payton; Other batters: 35 Frank Thomas	Manager: 39 Ken Macha; Coaches: -- Brad Fischer (bullpen); 53 Bob Geren (bench); 15 Rene Lachemann (first base); 48 Gerald Perry (hitting); 38 Ron Washington (third base); 41 Curt Young (pitching)

== Player stats ==
=== Batting ===
==== Starters by position ====
Note: Pos = Position; G = Games played; AB = At bats; H = Hits; Avg. = Batting average; HR = Home runs; RBI = Runs batted in

Pos	Player	G	AB	H	Avg.	HR	RBI
C	Jason Kendall	143	552	163	.295	1	50
1B	Dan Johnson	91	286	67	.234	9	37
2B	Mark Ellis	124	441	110	.249	11	52
SS	Bobby Crosby	96	358	82	.229	9	40
3B	Eric Chavez	137	445	117	.241	22	72
LF	Nick Swisher	157	556	141	.254	35	95
CF	Mark Kotsay	129	502	138	.275	7	59
RF	Milton Bradley	96	351	97	.276	14	52
DH	Frank Thomas	137	466	126	.270	39	114

==== Other batters ====
Note: G = Games played; AB = At bats; H = Hits; Avg. = Batting average; HR = Home runs; RBI = Runs batted in

Player	G	AB	H	Avg.	HR	RBI
Jay Payton	142	557	165	.296	10	59
Marco Scutaro	117	365	97	.266	5	41
Bobby Kielty	81	270	73	.270	8	36
Adam Melhuse	49	128	28	.219	4	18
Antonio Pérez	57	98	10	.102	1	8
Mike Rouse	8	24	7	.292	0	2
D'Angelo Jiménez	8	14	1	.071	0	0
Hiram Bocachica	8	13	3	.231	0	0
Jeremy Brown	5	10	3	.300	0	0
Doug Clark	6	6	1	.167	0	0

=== Pitching ===
==== Starting pitchers ====
Note: G = Games pitched; IP = Innings pitched; W = Wins; L = Losses; ERA = Earned run average; SO = Strikeouts

Player	G	IP	W	L	ERA	SO
Dan Haren	34	223.0	14	13	4.12	176
Barry Zito	34	221.0	16	10	3.83	151
Joe Blanton	32	194.1	16	12	4.82	107
Esteban Loaiza	26	154.2	11	9	4.89	97
Rich Harden	9	46.2	4	0	4.24	49
Shane Komine	2	9.0	0	0	5.00	1

==== Other pitchers ====
Note: G = Games pitched; IP = Innings pitched; W = Wins; L = Losses; ERA = Earned run average; SO = Strikeouts

Player	G	IP	W	L	ERA	SO
Kirk Saarloos	35	121.1	7	7	4.75	52
Brad Halsey	52	94.1	5	4	4.67	53
Jason Windsor	4	13.2	0	1	6.59	6

==== Relief pitchers ====
Note: G = Games pitched; W = Wins; L = Losses; SV = Saves; ERA = Earned run average; SO = Strikeouts

Player	G	W	L	SV	ERA	SO
Huston Street	69	4	4	37	3.31	67
Kiko Calero	70	3	2	2	3.41	67
Chad Gaudin	55	4	2	2	3.09	36
Justin Duchscherer	53	2	1	9	2.91	51
Joe Kennedy	39	4	1	1	2.31	29
Ron Flores	25	1	2	1	3.34	20
Scott Sauerbeck	22	0	0	0	3.65	6
Jay Witasick	20	1	0	0	6.75	23
Randy Keisler	11	0	0	0	4.50	5
Steve Karsay	9	1	0	0	5.79	5
Matt Roney	3	0	1	0	4.50	0
Santiago Casilla	2	0	0	0	11.57	2

== Farm system ==
Level	Team	League	Manager
AAA	Sacramento River Cats	Pacific Coast League	Tony DeFrancesco
AA	Midland RockHounds	Texas League	Von Hayes
A	Stockton Ports	California League	Todd Steverson
A	Kane County Cougars	Midwest League	Aaron Nieckula
A-Short Season	Vancouver Canadians	Northwest League	Dennis Rogers
Rookie	AZL Athletics	Arizona League	Ruben Escalera
