= 2006 Texas Rangers season =

2006 Texas Rangers
- League: American League
- Division: West
- Ballpark: Ameriquest Field in Arlington
- City: Arlington, Texas
- Record: 80–82 (.494)
- Divisional place: 3rd
- Owners: Tom Hicks
- General managers: Jon Daniels
- Managers: Buck Showalter
- Television: KDFI; KDFW; FSN Southwest (Tom Grieve, Josh Lewin)
- Radio: KRLD (Eric Nadel, Victor Rojas); KFLC (Eleno Ornelas, José Guzmán)

The 2006 Texas Rangers season was the 46th of the Texas Rangers franchise overall, their 35th in Arlington as the Rangers, and the 13th season at Ameriquest Field in Arlington. The Rangers finished the 2006 season, third in the American League West. They had two players feature in the 2006 All-Star Game: Michael Young who in his 3rd appearance was named the All Star Game's Most Valuable Player; and Gary Matthews Jr. making his first appearance.

== Offseason ==
- December 8, 2005: Termel Sledge was traded by the Washington Nationals with Armando Galarraga and Brad Wilkerson to the Texas Rangers for Alfonso Soriano.
- January 6, 2006: Termel Sledge was traded by the Texas Rangers with Adrian Gonzalez and Chris Young to the San Diego Padres for Billy Killian (minors), Adam Eaton and Akinori Otsuka.

== Regular season ==
=== Opening Day starters ===
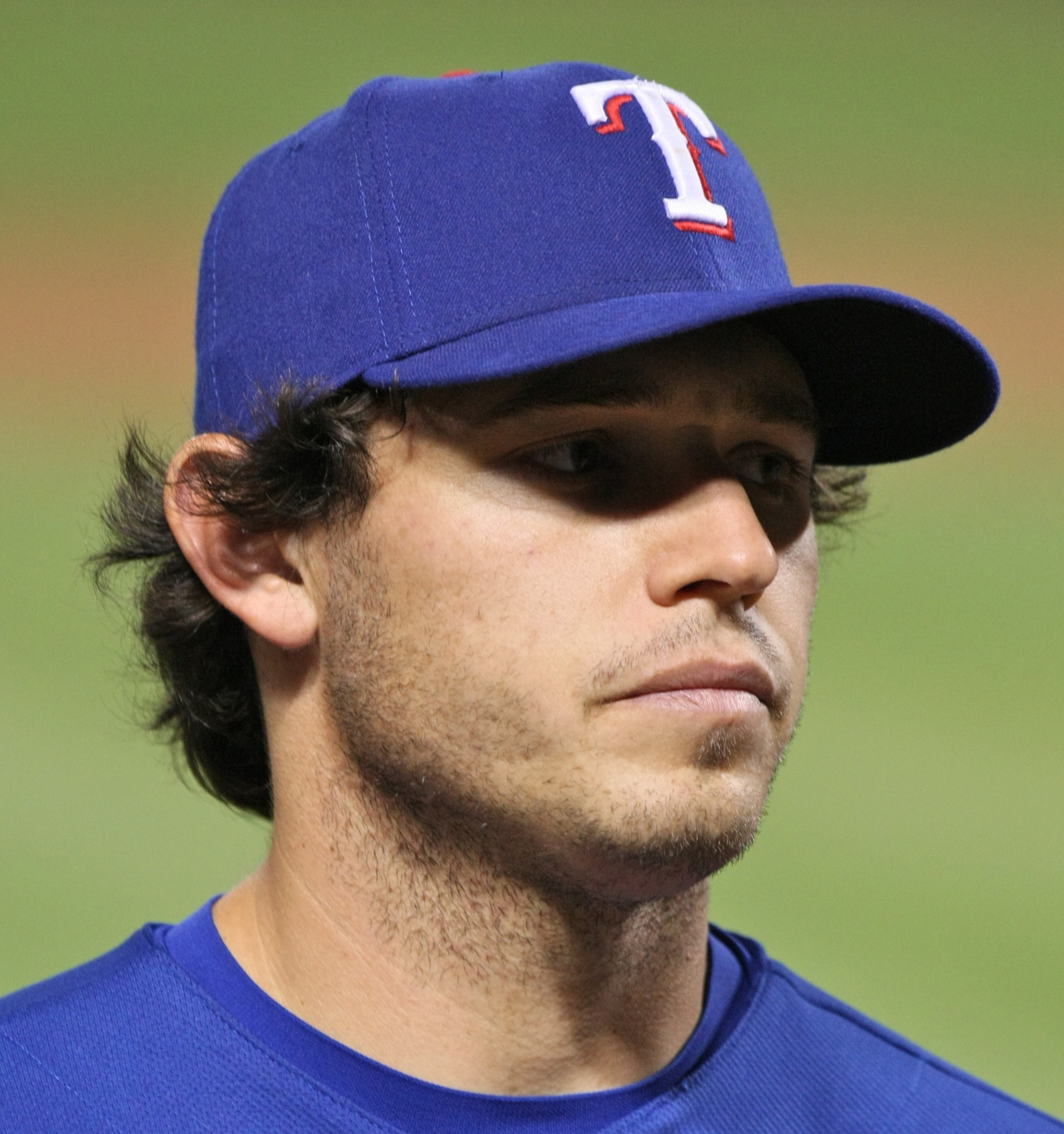
All Star Ian Kinsler

- Rod Barajas, C
- Mark Teixeira, 1B
- Ian Kinsler, 2B*
- Hank Blalock, 3B
- Michael Young, SS
- Brad Wilkerson, LF
- Laynce Nix, CF
- Kevin Mench, RF
- Phil Nevin, DH
- Kevin Millwood, RHP

*Rookie

=== Season standings ===
AL West
Team	W	L	Pct.	GB	Home	Road
Oakland Athletics	93	69	.574	—	49‍–‍32	44‍–‍37
Los Angeles Angels of Anaheim	89	73	.549	4	45‍–‍36	44‍–‍37
Texas Rangers	80	82	.494	13	39‍–‍42	41‍–‍40
Seattle Mariners	78	84	.481	15	44‍–‍37	34‍–‍47

=== Record vs. opponents ===
2006 American League record Source: MLB Standings Grid – 2006
Team	BAL	BOS	CWS	CLE	DET	KC	LAA	MIN	NYY	OAK	SEA	TB	TEX	TOR	NL
Baltimore	—	3–15	2–5	4–2	3–3	5–1	4–6	3–6	7–12	2–4	4–6	13–6	3–6	8–11	9–9
Boston	15–3	—	4–2	3–4	3–3	4–5	3–3	1–5	8–11	3–7	4–6	10–9	5–4	7–12	16–2
Chicago	5–2	2–4	—	8–11	12–7	11–8	6–3	9–10	2–4	3–3	5–4	3–3	5–5	5–4	14–4
Cleveland	2–4	4–3	11–8	—	6–13	10–8	4–5	8–11	3–4	3–6	4–5	6–1	5–4	4–2	8–10
Detroit	3–3	3–3	7–12	13–6	—	14–4	3–5	11–8	2–5	5–4	6–3	5–3	5–5	3–3	15–3
Kansas City	1–5	5–4	8–11	8–10	4–14	—	3–7	7–12	2–7	4–5	3–5	1–5	3–3	3–4	10–8
Los Angeles	6–4	3–3	3–6	5–4	5–3	7–3	—	4–2	6–4	11–8	10–9	7–2	11–8	4–6	7–11
Minnesota	6–3	5–1	10–9	11–8	8–11	12–7	2–4	—	3–3	6–4	5–3	6–1	4–5	2–5	16–2
New York	12–7	11–8	4–2	4–3	5–2	7–2	4–6	3–3	—	3–6	3–3	13–5	8–2	10–8	10–8
Oakland	4–2	7–3	3–3	6–3	4–5	5–4	8–11	4–6	6–3	—	17–2	6–3	9–10	6–4	8–10
Seattle	6–4	6–4	4–5	5–4	3–6	5–3	9–10	3–5	3–3	2–17	—	6–3	8–11	4–5	14–4
Tampa Bay	6–13	9–10	3–3	1–6	3–5	5–1	2–7	1–6	5–13	3–6	3–6	—	3–6	6–12	11–7
Texas	6–3	4–5	5–5	4–5	5–5	3–3	8–11	5–4	2–8	10–9	11–8	6–3	—	4–2	7–11
Toronto	11–8	12–7	4–5	2–4	3–3	4–3	6–4	5–2	8–10	4–6	5–4	12–6	2–4	—	9–9

=== Notable transactions ===
- July 28, 2006: Carlos Lee was traded by the Milwaukee Brewers with Nelson Cruz to the Texas Rangers for Laynce Nix, Kevin Mench, Francisco Cordero, and Julian Cordero (minors).
- August 4, 2006: Randall Simon was signed as a free agent with the Texas Rangers.
- September 1, 2006: Randall Simon was purchased by the Philadelphia Phillies from the Texas Rangers.

=== Roster ===
2006 Texas Rangers
Roster
Pitchers: 57 Antonio Alfonseca; 30 Rick Bauer; 53 Joaquín Benoit; 51 Fabio Castro; 31 Francisco Cordero; 37 Bryan Corey; 45 R. A. Dickey; 21 Adam Eaton; 39 Scott Feldman; 50 Frank Francisco; 41 John Koronka; 58 Wes Littleton; 43 Kameron Loe; 32 Ron Mahay; 57 Nick Masset; 33 Kevin Millwood; 40 Akinori Otsuka; 44 Vicente Padilla; 48 John Rheinecker; 59 Josh Rupe; 58 Brian Shouse; 55 Robinson Tejeda; 38 Edinson Vólquez; 47 John Wasdin; 31 Kip Wells; 36 C. J. Wilson	Catchers: 27 Rod Barajas; 15 Gerald Laird; 49 Miguel Ojeda; Infielders: 3 Joaquín Árias; 9 Hank Blalock; 4 D'Angelo Jiménez; 5 Ian Kinsler; 2 Drew Meyer; 25 Phil Nevin; 12 Matt Stairs; 23 Mark Teixeira; 2 Eric Young; 10 Michael Young	Outfielders: 20 Jason Botts; 24 Adrian Brown; 17 Nelson Cruz; 7 Mark DeRosa; 4 Freddy Guzmán; 25 Jerry Hairston Jr.; 16 Adam Hyzdu; 45 Carlos Lee; 14 Gary Matthews Jr.; 28 Kevin Mench; 17 Laynce Nix; 6 Brad Wilkerson	Manager: 11 Buck Showalter; Coaches: 56 Dom Chiti (bullpen); 52 Mark Connor (pitching); 8 Rudy Jaramillo (hitting); 46 Bobby Jones (first base); 1 Steve Smith (third base); 18 Don Wakamatsu (bench)

=== Game log ===
2006 game log
April

#	Date	Opponent	Score	Win	Loss	Save	Attendance	Record
1	April 3	Red Sox	7–3	Schilling	Millwood (0–1)		51,541	0–1
2	April 4	Red Sox	10–4	Padilla (1–0)	Wakefield		29,442	1–1
3	April 5	Red Sox	2–1	Beckett	Loe (0–1)	Papelbon	32,416	1–2
4	April 6	Tigers	10–6	Robertson	Dickey (0–1)		21,713	1–3
5	April 7	Tigers	5–2	Maroth	Koronka (0–1)	Rodney	21,155	1–4
6	April 8	Tigers	7–0	Verlander	Millwood (0–2)		35,066	1–5
7	April 9	Tigers	5–3	Padilla (2–0)	Rogers	Cordero (1)	31,032	2–5
8	April 10	@ Angels	5–2	Lackey	Loe (0–2)	Rodríguez	38,003	2–6
9	April 11	@ Angels	5–4	Romero	Cordero (0–1)		40,012	2–7
10	April 12	@ Angels	11–3	Koronka (1–1)	Escobar		42,911	3–7
11	April 14	@ Athletics	6–3	Millwood (1–2)	Zito		14,049	4–7
12	April 15	@ Athletics	5–4	Harden	Padilla (2–1)	Street	16,186	4–8
13	April 16	@ Athletics	5–3	Cordero (1–1)	Street		21,256	5–8
14	April 18	@ Mariners	7–4	Koronka (2–1)	Hernández	Cordero (2)	17,927	6–8
15	April 19	@ Mariners	9–6	Putz	Cordero (1–2)		17,613	6–9
16	April 20	@ Mariners	4–3	Bauer (1–0)	Guardado	Cordero (3)	17,917	7–9
17	April 21	Devil Rays	13–7	Wilson (1–0)	McClung		25,129	8–9
18	April 22	Devil Rays	6–5	Cordero (2–2)	Orvella		35,302	9–9
19	April 23	Devil Rays	8–3	Koronka (3–1)	Fossum		29,232	10–9
20	April 24	Athletics	3–2	Blanton	Wilson (1–1)	Duchscherer	23,802	10–10
21	April 25	Athletics	6–5	Cordero (3–2)	Gaudin		25,492	11–10
22	April 26	Athletics	6–4	Duchscherer	Wilson (1–2)	Kennedy	23,756	11–11
23	April 28	@ Indians	7–6	Davis	Bauer (1–1)	Wickman	22,106	11–12
24	April 29	@ Indians	7–5	Millwood (2–2)	Carmona	Otsuka (1)	37,496	12–12
25	April 30	@ Indians	8–4	Padilla (3–1)	Davis		22,989	13–12

May

#	Date	Opponent	Score	Win	Loss	Save	Attendance	Record
26	May 1	@ Devil Rays	3–0	Loe (1–2)	McClung	Otsuka (2)	7,295	14–12
27	May 2	@ Devil Rays	7–5	Tejeda (1–0)	Hendrickson	Otsuka (3)	7,147	15–12
28	May 3	Orioles	2–1	Bauer (2–1)	Halama		23,783	16–12
29	May 4	Orioles	8–2	Millwood (3–2)	Chen		21,962	17–12
30	May 5	Yankees	8–7	Mussina	Padilla (3–2)	Rivera	39,002	17–13
31	May 6	Yankees	6–1	Chacón	Loe (1–3)		48,634	17–14
32	May 7	Yankees	8–5	Wang	Tejeda (1–1)		46,013	17–15
33	May 8	Twins	6–4	Koronka (4–1)	Radke	Otsuka (4)	18,608	18–15
34	May 9	Twins	15–5	Silva	Millwood (3–3)	Liriano	19,309	18–16
35	May 10	Twins	4–3	Lohse	Padilla (3–3)	Nathan	23,037	18–17
36	May 12	@ Red Sox	6–0	Loe (2–3)	Clement		36,102	19–17
–	May 13	@ Red Sox	Postponed					19–17
–	May 14	@ Red Sox	Postponed					19–17
37	May 15	@ Yankees	4–2	Millwood (4–3)	Farnsworth	Otsuka (5)	41,115	20–17
38	May 16	@ Yankees	14–13	Rivera	Otsuka (0–1)		40,757	20–18
39	May 17	@ Yankees	4–3	Wang	Loe (2–4)	Rivera	52,547	20–19
40	May 18	@ Yankees	6–2	Padilla (4–3)	Wright		47,194	21–19
41	May 19	@ Astros	5–3	Qualls	Benoit (0–1)	Lidge	40,790	21–20
42	May 20	@ Astros	6–0	Millwood (5–3)	Pettitte		41,480	22–20
43	May 21	@ Astros	5–0	Buchholz	Koronka (4–2)		37,979	22–21
44	May 22	Angels	3–2	Loe (3–4)	Escobar	Otsuka (6)	22,032	23–21
45	May 23	Angels	7–6	Carrasco	Cordero (3–3)	Rodríguez	21,833	23–22
46	May 24	Angels	8–5	Weaver	Tejeda (1–2)		16,536	23–23
47	May 25	Athletics	8–7	Otsuka (1–1)	Street		22,006	24–23
48	May 26	Athletics	5–3	Cordero (4–3)	Gaudin	Otsuka (7)	27,791	25–23
49	May 27	Athletics	6–3	Zito	Loe (3–5)	Street	41,226	25–24
50	May 28	Athletics	4–3	Padilla (5–3)	Saarloos	Otsuka (8)	38,905	26–24
51	May 29	Mariners	2–0	Rheinecker (1–0)	Washburn	Bauer (1)	23,771	27–24
52	May 30	Mariners	6–4	Millwood (6–3)	Meche	Otsuka (9)	18,084	28–24
53	May 31	Mariners	14–5	Hernández	Koronka (4–3)		19,131	28–25

June

#	Date	Opponent	Score	Win	Loss	Save	Attendance	Record
54	June 2	@ White Sox	4–3	Cordero (5–3)	McCarthy	Otsuka (10)	32,802	29–25
55	June 3	@ White Sox	8–6	Vázquez	Padilla (5–4)	Jenks	38,697	29–26
56	June 4	@ White Sox	10–2	Rheinecker (2–0)	Buehrle		35,915	30–26
57	June 6	@ Royals	6–2	Millwood (7–3)	Elarton	Cordero (4)	11,715	31–26
58	June 7	@ Royals	4–2	Otsuka (2–1)	Burgos	Cordero (5)	11,246	32–26
59	June 8	@ Royals	16–12	Gobble	Mahay (0–1)		11,815	32–27
60	June 9	@ Red Sox	4–3	Papelbon	Cordero (5–4)		36,133	32–28
61	June 10	@ Red Sox	7–4	Corey (1–0)	Tavárez	Otsuka (11)	36,920	33–28
–	June 10	@ Red Sox	Postponed					33–28
62	June 11	@ Red Sox	5–4	Delcarmen	Otsuka (2–2)		36,232	33–29
63	June 11	@ Red Sox	13–6	Wasdin (1–0)	Pauley		35,602	34–29
64	June 12	@ White Sox	8–3	Contreras	Koronka (4–4)		29,182	34–30
65	June 13	@ White Sox	5–2	Garland	Loe (3–6)	Jenks	18,354	34–31
66	June 14	@ White Sox	8–0	Padilla (6–4)	Vázquez		28,776	35–31
67	June 15	@ White Sox	8–2	Buehrle	Rheinecker (2–1)		19,424	35–32
68	June 16	Diamondbacks	5–3	Millwood (8–3)	Webb	Otsuka (12)	28,167	36–32
69	June 17	Diamondbacks	8–4	Koronka (5–4)	Jarvis		41,165	37–32
70	June 18	Diamondbacks	10–7	Cordero (6–4)	Vizcaíno	Otsuka (13)	24,358	38–32
71	June 20	Padres	6–5	Thompson	Feldman (0–1)	Hoffman	24,064	38–33
72	June 21	Padres	3–2	Linebrink	Otsuka (2–3)	Hoffman	29,047	38–34
73	June 22	Padres	5–3	Rheinecker (3–1)	Hensley	Otsuka (14)	24,637	39–34
74	June 23	@ Rockies	8–6	Koronka (6–4)	Francis	Otsuka (15)	28,360	40–34
75	June 24	@ Rockies	11–6	Fogg	Tejeda (1–3)		31,439	40–35
76	June 25	@ Rockies	3–0	Kim	Padilla (6–5)	Fuentes	28,313	40–36
77	June 27	@ Giants	5–3	Morris	Millwood (8–4)	Accardo	36,053	40–37
78	June 28	@ Giants	5–1	Lowry	Rheinecker (3–2)		37,275	40–38
79	June 29	@ Giants	2–1	Sánchez	Feldman (0–2)	Accardo	38,212	40–39
80	June 30	Astros	3–1	Padilla (7–5)	Oswalt	Otsuka (16)	40,177	41–39

July

#	Date	Opponent	Score	Win	Loss	Save	Attendance	Record
81	July 1	Astros	7–0	Buchholz	Wasdin (1–1)		35,131	41–40
82	July 2	Astros	9–5	Rodríguez	Millwood (8–5)	Lidge	39,298	41–41
83	July 3	Blue Jays	6–1	Rheinecker (4–2)	Lilly		30,021	42–41
84	July 4	Blue Jays	3–2	Halladay	Koronka (6–5)	Ryan	42,255	42–42
85	July 5	Blue Jays	9–3	Padilla (8–5)	Janssen	Cordero (6)	25,803	43–42
86	July 7	Twins	9–4	Wasdin (2–1)	Silva		30,207	44–42
87	July 8	Twins	4–0	Liriano	Rheinecker (4–3)		36,035	44–43
88	July 9	Twins	5–2	Bauer (3–1)	Santana	Otsuka (17)	23,268	45–43
89	July 13	@ Orioles	15–1	Padilla (9–5)	Cabrera		22,780	46–43
90	July 14	@ Orioles	2–1	Millwood (9–5)	Benson	Otsuka (18)	28,201	47–43
91	July 15	@ Orioles	8–1	Bédard	Rheinecker (4–4)		35,804	47–44
92	July 16	@ Orioles	4–0	López	Wasdin (2–2)		25,169	47–45
93	July 17	@ Blue Jays	10–1	Lilly	Koronka (6–6)		16,872	47–46
94	July 18	@ Blue Jays	5–2	Padilla (10–5)	Schoeneweis	Otsuka (19)	20,017	48–46
95	July 19	@ Blue Jays	5–4	Millwood (10–5)	Janssen	Otsuka (20)	20,778	49–46
96	July 20	@ Red Sox	6–4	Schilling	Corey (1–1)	Timlin	36,489	49–47
97	July 21	@ White Sox	10–3	Mahay (1–1)	Buehrle	Bauer (2)	38,246	50–47
98	July 22	@ White Sox	3–1	Cordero (7–4)	Jenks	Otsuka (21)	39,250	51–47
99	July 23	@ White Sox	5–0	Garland	Padilla (10–6)		38,312	51–48
100	July 24	Yankees	6–2	Johnson	Millwood (10–6)		43,206	51–49
101	July 25	Yankees	7–4	Mussina	Eaton (0–1)	Rivera	42,171	51–50
102	July 26	Yankees	8–7	Chacón	Otsuka (2–4)	Rivera	43,527	51–51
103	July 28	Royals	11–3	Hudson	Padilla (10–7)		30,202	51–52
104	July 29	Royals	5–3	de la Rosa	Millwood (10–7)	Burgos	42,017	51–53
105	July 30	Royals	15–2	Koronka (7–6)	Redman		29,726	52–53
106	July 31	@ Twins	15–2	Silva	Rheinecker (4–5)		19,532	52–54

August

#	Date	Opponent	Score	Win	Loss	Save	Attendance	Record
107	August 1	@ Twins	9–0	Eaton (1–1)	Baker		25,969	53–54
108	August 2	@ Twins	10–2	Wells (1–0)	Bonser		26,492	54–54
109	August 3	@ Angels	7–6	Littleton (1–0)	Gregg	Otsuka (22)	43,569	55–54
110	August 4	@ Angels	7–3	Padilla (11–7)	Lackey		44,074	56–54
111	August 5	@ Angels	10–3	Santana	Koronka (7–7)		43,701	56–55
112	August 6	@ Angels	9–1	Saunders	Eaton (1–2)		43,804	56–56
113	August 7	@ Athletics	7–4	Loaiza	Vólquez (0–1)	Calero	21,208	56–57
114	August 8	@ Athletics	7–6	Saarloos	Millwood (10–8)	Street	21,650	56–58
115	August 9	@ Athletics	14–0	Padilla (12–7)	Zito		30,127	58–57
116	August 10	Mariners	8–2	Eaton (2–2)	Piñeiro		31,763	58–58
117	August 11	Mariners	14–7	Littleton (2–0)	Meche		28,207	59–58
118	August 12	Mariners	5–4	Vólquez (1–1)	Moyer	Otsuka (23)	35,784	60–58
119	August 13	Mariners	10–6	Millwood (11–8)	Hernández		29,717	61–58
120	August 15	Angels	9–7	Carrasco	Littleton (2–1)	Rodríguez	26,561	61–59
121	August 16	Angels	9–3	Eaton (3–2)	Saunders		31,723	62–59
122	August 17	@ Tigers	4–2	Rogers	Vólquez (1–2)	Jones	34,756	62–60
123	August 18	@ Tigers	2–1	Millwood (12–8)	Miner	Otsuka (24)	39,327	63–60
124	August 19	@ Tigers	3–1	Tejeda (2–3)	Robertson	Otsuka (25)	41,643	64–60
125	August 20	@ Tigers	7–6	Benoit (1–1)	Grilli	Otsuka (26)	39,071	65–60
126	August 21	@ Devil Rays	4–3	Shields	Eaton (3–2)	McClung	7,820	65–61
127	August 22	@ Devil Rays	5–3	Camp	Padilla (12–8)	McClung	8,028	65–62
128	August 23	@ Devil Rays	7–3	Camp	Millwood (12–9)		9,701	65–63
129	August 24	@ Devil Rays	4–3	Tejeda (3–3)	Corcoran	Otsuka (27)	9,454	66–63
130	August 25	Athletics	9–3	Zito	Vólquez (1–3)		31,178	66–64
131	August 26	Athletics	5–3	Blanton	Eaton (3–4)	Duchscherer	37,752	66–65
132	August 27	Athletics	3–0	Padilla (13–8)	Haren	Otsuka (28)	25,708	67–65
133	August 29	Orioles	9–4	Millwood (13–9)	López		23,684	68–65
134	August 30	Orioles	7–4	Hawkins	Mahay (1–2)		23,812	68–66
135	August 31	Orioles	7–5	Eaton (4–4)	Cabrera	Otsuka (29)	21,446	69–66

September/October

#	Date	Opponent	Score	Win	Loss	Save	Attendance	Record
136	September 1	Indians	7–2	Westbrook	Padilla (13–9)		23,776	69–67
137	September 2	Indians	6–5	Lee	Vólquez (1–4)	Mastny	40,222	69–68
138	September 3	Indians	5–2	Millwood (14–9)	Byrd	Otsuka (30)	19,667	70–68
139	September 4	@ Athletics	8–1	Tejeda (4–3)	Zito		23,949	71–68
140	September 5	@ Athletics	5–4	Eaton (5–4)	Saarloos	Otsuka (31)	27,225	72–68
141	September 6	@ Athletics	9–6	Blanton	Rupe (0–1)	Duchscherer	17,838	72–69
142	September 8	@ Mariners	7–2	Baek	Millwood (14–10)	Piñeiro	28,646	72–70
143	September 9	@ Mariners	3–2	Fruto	Rheinecker (4–6)		33,454	72–71
144	September 10	@ Mariners	4–2	Wilson (2–2)	Huber	Otsuka (32)	34,321	73–71
145	September 12	@ Tigers	3–2	Rodney	Mahay (1–3)		24,196	73–72
146	September 13	@ Tigers	11–3	Millwood (15–10)	Verlander		24,672	74–72
147	September 14	Angels	2–1	Carrasco	Vólquez (1–5)	Rodríguez	21,488	74–73
148	September 15	Angels	2–1	Donnelly	Francisco (0–1)		30,788	74–74
149	September 16	Angels	12–6	Eaton (6–4)	Lackey		40,196	75–74
150	September 17	Angels	8–1	Padilla (14–9)	Santana		24,303	76–74
151	September 18	Mariners	8–1	Millwood (16–10)	Hernández		18,214	77–74
152	September 19	Mariners	9–7	Huber	Wilson (2–3)	Putz	18,551	77–75
153	September 20	Mariners	6–3	Baek	Tejeda (4–4)	Putz	26,006	77–76
154	September 22	Indians	12–4	Eaton (7–4)	Byrd		26,284	78–76
155	September 23	Indians	6–3	Miller	Padilla (14–10)	Betancourt	38,351	78–77
156	September 24	Indians	11–6	Westbrook	Millwood (16–11)		36,617	78–78
157	September 25	@ Angels	8–3	Saunders	Vólquez (1–6)	Shields	39,781	78–79
158	September 26	@ Angels	5–2	Tejeda (5–4)	Escobar	Littleton (1)	37,339	79–79
159	September 27	@ Angels	6–5	Donnelly	Wilson (2–4)	Rodríguez	38,032	79–80
160	September 29	@ Mariners	6–5	Padilla (15–10)	Fruto	Wilson (1)	30,766	80–80
161	September 30	@ Mariners	3–1	Hernández	Millwood (16–12)	Putz	23,310	80–81
162	October 1	@ Mariners	3–2	Woods	Tejeda (5–5)	Putz	28,361	80–82

== Player stats ==
=== Batting ===
==== Starters by position ====
Note: Pos = Position; G = Games played; AB = At bats; H = Hits; Avg. = Batting average; HR = Home runs; RBI = Runs batted in

Pos	Player	G	AB	H	Avg.	HR	RBI
SS	Michael Young	162	691	217	.314	14	103
CF	Gary Matthews Jr.	147	620	194	.313	19	79
RF	Mark DeRosa	136	520	154	.296	13	74
2B	Ian Kinsler	120	423	121	.286	14	55
1B	Mark Teixeira	162	628	177	.282	33	110
3B	Hank Blalock	152	591	157	.266	16	89
C	Rod Barajas	97	344	88	.256	11	41
LF	Brad Wilkerson	95	320	71	.222	15	44
DH	Phil Nevin	46	176	38	.216	9	31

==== Other batters ====
Note: G = Games played; AB = At bats; H = Hits; Avg. = Batting average; HR = Home runs; RBI = Runs batted in

Player	G	AB	H	Avg.	HR	RBI
Kevin Mench	87	320	91	.284	12	50
Gerald Laird	78	243	72	.296	7	22
Carlos Lee	59	236	76	.322	9	35
Nelson Cruz	41	130	29	.223	6	22
Jerry Hairston Jr.	63	88	18	.205	0	6
Matt Stairs	26	81	17	.210	3	11
D'Angelo Jimenez	20	57	12	.211	1	8
Jason Botts	20	50	11	.220	1	6
Adrian Brown	25	36	7	.194	0	2
Laynce Nix	9	32	3	.094	0	4
Drew Meyer	5	14	3	.214	0	0
Miguel Ojeda	5	13	4	.308	0	4
Joaquín Arias	6	11	6	.545	0	1
Eric Young Sr.	4	10	2	.200	0	2
Freddy Guzmán	9	7	2	.286	0	0
Adam Hyzdu	2	4	1	.250	0	0

=== Pitching ===
==== Starting pitchers ====
Note: G = Games pitched; IP = Innings pitched; W = Wins; L = Losses; ERA = Earned run average; SO = Strikeouts

Player	G	IP	W	L	ERA	SO
Kevin Millwood	34	215.0	16	12	4.52	157
Vicente Padilla	33	200.0	15	10	4.50	156
John Koronka	23	125.0	7	7	5.69	61
Kameron Loe	15	78.1	3	6	5.86	34
Rob Tejeda	14	73.2	5	5	4.28	40
Adam Eaton	13	65.0	7	4	5.12	43
Edinson Vólquez	8	33.1	1	6	7.29	15
Kip Wells	2	8.0	1	0	5.63	4
R.A. Dickey	1	3.1	0	1	18.90	1

==== Other pitchers ====
Note: G = Games pitched; IP = Innings pitched; W = Wins; L = Losses; ERA = Earned run average; SO = Strikeouts

Player	G	IP	W	L	ERA	SO
John Rheinecker	21	70.2	4	6	5.86	28
John Wasdin	9	30.0	2	2	5.10	16

==== Relief pitchers ====
Note: G = Games pitched; W = Wins; L = Losses; SV = Saves; ERA = Earned run average; SO = Strikeouts

Player	G	W	L	SV	ERA	SO
Akinori Otsuka	63	2	4	32	2.11	47
Ron Mahay	62	1	3	0	3.95	56
Rick Bauer	58	3	1	2	3.55	35
Joaquin Benoit	56	1	1	0	4.86	85
Francisco Cordero	49	7	4	6	4.81	54
C.J. Wilson	44	2	4	1	4.06	43
Scott Feldman	36	0	2	0	3.92	30
Wes Littleton	33	2	1	1	1.73	17
Antonio Alfonseca	19	0	0	0	5.63	5
Josh Rupe	16	0	1	0	3.41	14
Bryan Corey	16	1	1	0	2.60	13
Nick Masset	8	0	0	0	4.15	4
Frank Francisco	8	0	1	0	4.91	6
Brian Shouse	6	0	0	0	4.15	3
Fabio Castro	4	0	0	0	4.32	5

=== Team statistics ===
Positions in brackets are in league with other MLB teams

==== Batting ====
Note: G = Games played; AB = At bats; H = Hits; R = Runs; Avg. = Batting average; HR = Home runs; RBI = Runs batted in

Team	G	AB	H	R	Avg.	HR	RBI
Rangers	162	5659 (3rd)	1571 (6th)	835 (6th)	.278 (6th)	183 (13th)	799 (7th)
Opponents	162	5601	1558	784	.278	162	750

==== Pitching ====
Note: G = Games pitched; IP = Innings pitched; W = Wins; L = Losses; ERA = Earned run average; SO = Strikeouts; SHO = Shutouts

Team	G	IP	W	L	ERA	SO	SHO
Rangers	162	1431.1 (22nd)	80 (15th)	82 (15th)	4.60 (18th)	972 (25th)	8 (18th)

== Awards and honors ==
- Mark Teixeira, 1B, Gold Glove

All-Star Game

== Farm system ==
Level	Team	League	Manager
AAA	Oklahoma RedHawks	Pacific Coast League	Tim Ireland and Mike Boulanger
AA	Frisco RoughRiders	Texas League	Darryl Kennedy
A	Bakersfield Blaze	California League	Carlos Subero
A	Clinton LumberKings	Midwest League	Andy Fox
A-Short Season	Spokane Indians	Northwest League	Mike Micucci
Rookie	AZL Rangers	Arizona League	Pedro López
