= 2006 Los Angeles Angels season =

Major League Baseball season

2006 Los Angeles Angels
- League: American League
- Division: West
- Ballpark: Angel Stadium
- City: Anaheim, California
- Record: 89–73 (.549)
- Divisional place: 2nd
- Owner: Arte Moreno
- General manager: Bill Stoneman
- Manager: Mike Scioscia
- Television: FSN West; KCOP (UPN 13) •Rex Hudler, Steve Physioc
- Radio: KSPN (AM 710) •Terry Smith, Rory Markas
- Stats: ESPN.com; Baseball Reference

The 2006 Los Angeles Angels season was the 46th season of the Los Angeles Angels franchise in the American League, the 41st in Anaheim, and their 41st season playing their home games at Angel Stadium. It began with the team trying to win their third consecutive American League West title. However, they came up short, finishing in second place with a record of 89–73, missing the postseason for the first time since 2003. But the biggest story of the year was longtime Angels mainstay Tim Salmon playing his final season. Towards the end of the season, not only were the fans excited with trying to get into the playoffs in the final month of the season, but they were excited about Salmon trying to hit his 300th home run. Eventually, he ended with 299, one short of the milestone.

== Regular season ==
=== Season standings ===
AL West
Team	W	L	Pct.	GB	Home	Road
Oakland Athletics	93	69	.574	—	49‍–‍32	44‍–‍37
Los Angeles Angels	89	73	.549	4	45‍–‍36	44‍–‍37
Texas Rangers	80	82	.494	13	39‍–‍42	41‍–‍40
Seattle Mariners	78	84	.481	15	44‍–‍37	34‍–‍47

=== Record vs. opponents ===
2006 American League record Source: MLB Standings Grid – 2006
Team	BAL	BOS	CWS	CLE	DET	KC	LAA	MIN	NYY	OAK	SEA	TB	TEX	TOR	NL
Baltimore	—	3–15	2–5	4–2	3–3	5–1	4–6	3–6	7–12	2–4	4–6	13–6	3–6	8–11	9–9
Boston	15–3	—	4–2	3–4	3–3	4–5	3–3	1–5	8–11	3–7	4–6	10–9	5–4	7–12	16–2
Chicago	5–2	2–4	—	8–11	12–7	11–8	6–3	9–10	2–4	3–3	5–4	3–3	5–5	5–4	14–4
Cleveland	2–4	4–3	11–8	—	6–13	10–8	4–5	8–11	3–4	3–6	4–5	6–1	5–4	4–2	8–10
Detroit	3–3	3–3	7–12	13–6	—	14–4	3–5	11–8	2–5	5–4	6–3	5–3	5–5	3–3	15–3
Kansas City	1–5	5–4	8–11	8–10	4–14	—	3–7	7–12	2–7	4–5	3–5	1–5	3–3	3–4	10–8
Los Angeles	6–4	3–3	3–6	5–4	5–3	7–3	—	4–2	6–4	11–8	10–9	7–2	11–8	4–6	7–11
Minnesota	6–3	5–1	10–9	11–8	8–11	12–7	2–4	—	3–3	6–4	5–3	6–1	4–5	2–5	16–2
New York	12–7	11–8	4–2	4–3	5–2	7–2	4–6	3–3	—	3–6	3–3	13–5	8–2	10–8	10–8
Oakland	4–2	7–3	3–3	6–3	4–5	5–4	8–11	4–6	6–3	—	17–2	6–3	9–10	6–4	8–10
Seattle	6–4	6–4	4–5	5–4	3–6	5–3	9–10	3–5	3–3	2–17	—	6–3	8–11	4–5	14–4
Tampa Bay	6–13	9–10	3–3	1–6	3–5	5–1	2–7	1–6	5–13	3–6	3–6	—	3–6	6–12	11–7
Texas	6–3	4–5	5–5	4–5	5–5	3–3	8–11	5–4	2–8	10–9	11–8	6–3	—	4–2	7–11
Toronto	11–8	12–7	4–5	2–4	3–3	4–3	6–4	5–2	8–10	4–6	5–4	12–6	2–4	—	9–9

=== Roster ===
2006 Los Angeles Angels
Roster
Pitchers: 49 Chris Bootcheck; 12 Jason Bulger; 43,48 Héctor Carrasco; 40 Bartolo Colón; 53 Brendan Donnelly; 45 Kelvim Escobar; 63 Kevin Gregg; 37 Greg Jones; 41 John Lackey; 58 Dustin Moseley; 57 Francisco Rodríguez; 33 J. C. Romero; 54 Ervin Santana; 68 Joe Saunders; 62 Scot Shields; 36 Jeff Weaver; 56 Jered Weaver; 59 Esteban Yan	Catchers: 5 Jeff Mathis; 28 José Molina; 44 Mike Napoli; Infielders: 13 Edgardo Alfonzo; 32 Erick Aybar; 18 Orlando Cabrera; 6 Maicer Izturis; 47 Howie Kendrick; 2 Adam Kennedy; 35 Casey Kotchman; 8 Dallas McPherson; 22 Kendrys Morales; 39 Robb Quinlan	Outfielders: 16 Garret Anderson; 17 Darin Erstad; 9 Chone Figgins; 27 Vladimir Guerrero; 65 Tommy Murphy; 19 Curtis Pride; 20 Juan Rivera; 15 Tim Salmon; 77 Reggie Willits	Manager: 14 Mike Scioscia; Coaches: 24 Bud Black (pitching); 21 Dino Ebel (third base); 4 Alfredo Griffin (first base); 7 Mickey Hatcher (hitting); 48 Orlando Mercado (bullpen); 10 Ron Roenicke (bench)

=== Game log ===
2006 game log
April (12–13)

#	Date	Opponent	Score	Win	Loss	Save	Attendance	Record	Stadium	Boxscore	GB
1	April 3	@ Mariners	5–4	Shields (1–0)	Sherrill (0–1)	Rodríguez (1)	45,515	1–0	Safeco Field		+1
2	April 4	@ Mariners	10–8	Piñeiro (1–0)	Lackey (0–1)		20,051	1–1	Safeco Field		0
3	April 5	@ Mariners	6–4	Washburn (1–0)	Jeff Weaver (0–1)	Sherrill (1)	21,394	1–2	Safeco Field		-1
4	April 7	Yankees	4–1	Escobar (1–0)	Chacón (0–1)	Rodríguez (2)	44,221	2–2	Angel Stadium		-1/2
5	April 8	Yankees	3–2	Santana (1–0)	Johnson (1–1)	Rodríguez (3)	44,044	3–2	Angel Stadium		-1/2
6	April 9	Yankees	10–1	Mussina (1–0)	Colón (0–1)		44,020	3–3	Angel Stadium		-1 1/2
7	April 10	Rangers	5–2	Lackey (1–1)	Loe (0–2)	Rodríguez (4)	38,003	4–3	Angel Stadium		-1
8	April 11	Rangers	5–4	Romero (1–0)	Cordero (0–1)		40,012	5–3	Angel Stadium		0
9	April 12	Rangers	11–3	Koronka (1–1)	Escobar (1–1)		42,911	5–4	Angel Stadium		0
10	April 14	@ Orioles	6–5	Byrdak (1–0)	Shields (1–1)		25,415	5–5	Oriole Park at Camden Yards		+1/2
11	April 15	@ Orioles	3–2	Bédard (3–0)	Colón (0–2)	Ray (4)	24,497	5–6	Oriole Park at Camden Yards		-1/2
12	April 16	@ Orioles	9–3	Lackey (2–1)	Benson (1–2)		19,904	6–6	Oriole Park at Camden Yards		+1/2
13	April 17	@ Orioles	4–2	Cabrera (1–1)	Jeff Weaver (0–2)	Ray (5)	15,691	6–7	Oriole Park at Camden Yards		0
14	April 18	@ Twins	8–2	Escobar (2–1)	Silva (1–2)	Shields (1)	15,787	7–7	HHH Metrodome		0
15	April 19	@ Twins	12–10 (10)	Nathan (1–0)	Romero (1–1)		21,507	7–8	HHH Metrodome		0
16	April 20	@ Twins	6–4	Gregg (1–0)	Crain (0–1)	Rodríguez (5)	12,990	8–8	HHH Metrodome		+1
17	April 21	@ Athletics	5–3	Harden (3–0)	Romero (1–2)	Calero (1)	19,874	8–9	McAfee Coliseum		0
18	April 22	@ Athletics	5–4	Jeff Weaver (1–2)	Haren (0–2)	Rodríguez (6)	22,670	9–9	McAfee Coliseum		0
19	April 23	@ Athletics	4–3	Escobar (3–1)	Loaiza (0–3)	Rodríguez (7)	27,104	10–9	McAfee Coliseum		0
20	April 24	Tigers	3–0	Santana (2–0)	Rogers (3–2)	Rodríguez (8)	39,776	11–9	Angel Stadium		+1
21	April 25	Tigers	5–2	Bonderman (2–2)	Carrasco (0–1)	Jones (3)	40,007	11–10	Angel Stadium		0
22	April 26	Tigers	4–0	Lackey (3–1)	Maroth (3–1)		37,532	12–10	Angel Stadium		+1
23	April 28	White Sox	8–5	García (4–1)	Jeff Weaver (1–3)		43,940	12–11	Angel Stadium		+1
24	April 29	White Sox	2–1	Contreras (4–0)	Escobar (3–2)	Jenks (7)	44,065	12–12	Angel Stadium		0
25	April 30	White Sox	6–5	Politte (1–1)	Shields (1–2)	Cotts (1)	44,135	12–13	Angel Stadium		-1

May (11–17)

#	Date	Opponent	Score	Win	Loss	Save	Attendance	Record	Stadium	Boxscore	GB
26	May 1	Athletics	1–0	Zito (2–2)	Carrasco (0–2)	Duchscherer (2)	41,721	12–14	Angel Stadium		-2
27	May 2	Athletics	10–3	Halsey (1–0)	Lackey (3–2)		35,943	12–15	Angel Stadium		-3
28	May 3	@ Tigers	2–1	Zumaya (1–0)	Jeff Weaver (1–4)	Rodney (5)	17,171	12–16	Comerica Park		-4
29	May 4	@ Tigers	7–2	Gregg (2–0)	Verlander (3–3)		24,879	13–16	Comerica Park		-4
30	May 5	@ Blue Jays	13–3	Chacín (5–1)	Santana (2–1)		22,227	13–17	Rogers Centre		-4
31	May 6	@ Blue Jays	3–0	Escobar (4–2)	Lilly (3–2)	Rodríguez (9)	29,761	14–17	Rogers Centre		-3
32	May 7	@ Blue Jays	3–1	Janssen (1–2)	Lackey (3–3)	Ryan (7)	24,351	14–18	Rogers Centre		-3
33	May 8	@ Blue Jays	5–1	Halladay (4–1)	Jeff Weaver (1–5)		18,611	14–19	Rogers Centre		-4
34	May 9	@ White Sox	9–1	García (5–1)	Gregg (2–1)		36,539	14–20	U.S. Cellular Field		-4
35	May 10	@ White Sox	12–5	Santana (3–1)	Haeger (0–1)	Rodríguez (10)	31,034	15–20	U.S. Cellular Field		-3
	May 11	@ White Sox	Postponed (rain); Rescheduled for August 7					15–20	U.S. Cellular Field		-3 1/2
36	May 12	Mariners	12–7	Escobar (5–2)	Piñeiro (4–3)	Carrasco (1)	43,912	16–20	Angel Stadium		-4
37	May 13	Mariners	5–4 (13)	Sherrill (1–1)	Gregg (2–2)	Woods (1)	43,821	16–21	Angel Stadium		-3 1/2
38	May 14	Mariners	9–4	Meche (3–2)	Jeff Weaver (1–6)	Fruto (1)	43,191	16–22	Angel Stadium		-4
39	May 16	Blue Jays	8–3	Santana (4–1)	Lilly (4–3)		43,066	17–22	Angel Stadium		-3 1/2
40	May 17	Blue Jays	3–0	Janssen (2–3)	Escobar (5–3)	Ryan (9)	39,767	17–23	Angel Stadium		-3 1/2
41	May 18	Blue Jays	8–4	Frasor (1–0)	Rodríguez (0–1)		37,850	17–24	Angel Stadium		-4 1/2
42	May 19	@ Dodgers	16–3	Sele (2–0)	Jeff Weaver (1–7)		55,655	17–25	Dodger Stadium		-5 1/2
43	May 20	@ Dodgers	8–4	Beimel (1–0)	Shields (1–3)		55,587	17–26	Dodger Stadium		-5 1/2
44	May 21	@ Dodgers	7–0	Lowe (2–3)	Santana (4–2)		55,662	17–27	Dodger Stadium		-5 1/2
45	May 22	@ Rangers	3–2	Loe (3–4)	Escobar (5–4)	Otsuka (6)	22,032	17–28	Ameriquest Field in Arlington		-6 1/2
46	May 23	@ Rangers	7–6	Carrasco (1–2)	Cordero (3–3)	Rodríguez (11)	21,859	18–28	Ameriquest Field in Arlington		-5 1/2
47	May 24	@ Rangers	8–5	Jeff Weaver (2–7)	Tejada (1–2)		16,512	19–28	Ameriquest Field in Arlington		-4 1/2
48	May 26	Orioles	5–2	Shields (2–3)	Williams (1–2)	Rodríguez (12)	42,675	20–28	Angel Stadium		-5
49	May 27	Orioles	10–1	Jered Weaver (1–0)	Bédard (5–4)		43,005	21–28	Angel Stadium		-4
50	May 28	Orioles	7–6	Birkins (1–0)	Escobar (5–5)	Ray (13)	40,856	21–29	Angel Stadium		-5
51	May 29	Twins	4–3	Shields (3–3)	Crain (0–3)		40,007	22–29	Angel Stadium		-5
52	May 30	Twins	6–3	Jeff Weaver (3–7)	Baker (2–5)	Rodríguez (13)	37,299	23–29	Angel Stadium		-5
53	May 31	Twins	7–1	Liriano (4–0)	Santana (4–3)		40,001	23–30	Angel Stadium		-5

June (12–14)

#	Date	Opponent	Score	Win	Loss	Save	Attendance	Record	Stadium	Boxscore	GB
54	June 2	@ Indians	10–3	Jered Weaver (2–0)	Johnson (3–5)		22,957	24–30	Jacobs Field		-5
55	June 3	@ Indians	14–2	Lee (4–5)	Escobar (5–6)		23,769	24–31	Jacobs Field		-5
56	June 4	@ Indians	14–2	Lackey (4–3)	Sabathia (5–2)		19,128	25–31	Jacobs Field		-6
57	June 5	@ Devil Rays	4–0	Shields (1–0)	Jeff Weaver (3–8)	Walker (10)	9,519	25–32	Tropicana Field		-5 1/2
58	June 6	@ Devil Rays	12–2	Santana (5–3)	Kazmir (7–4)		13,762	26–32	Tropicana Field		-5 1/2
59	June 7	@ Devil Rays	6–2	Jered Weaver (3–0)	McClung (2–8)		9,517	27–32	Tropicana Field		-5 1/2
60	June 9	Mariners	4–1	Washburn (4–7)	Escobar (5–7)	Putz (10)	44,114	27–33	Angel Stadium		-5
61	June 10	Mariners	12–6	Meche (6–4)	Lackey (4–4)		44,129	27–34	Angel Stadium		-6
62	June 11	Mariners	6–2	Hernández (6–6)	Jeff Weaver (3–9)		42,198	27–35	Angel Stadium		-6 1/2
63	June 12	Royals	4–3	Santana (6–3)	Keppel (0–2)	Rodríguez (14)	36,146	28–35	Angel Stadium		-5 1/2
64	June 13	Royals	4–1	Jered Weaver (4–0)	Duckworth (0–1)	Rodríguez (15)	38,820	29–35	Angel Stadium		-4 1/2
65	June 14	Royals	4–3	Redman (3–4)	Shields (3–4)	Burgos (9)	38,910	29–36	Angel Stadium		-5 1/2
66	June 15	Royals	3–2	Carrasco (2–2)	Dessens (3–6)		41,649	30–36	Angel Stadium		-5
67	June 16	Padres	5–4	Embree (2–0)	Rodríguez (0–2)	Hoffman (16)	44,005	30–37	Angel Stadium		-6
68	June 17	Padres	3–2	Santana (7–3)	Peavy (4–8)	Rodríguez (16)	43,909	31–37	Angel Stadium		-6
69	June 18	Padres	7–3	Park (5–3)	Colón (0–3)		44,159	31–38	Angel Stadium		-7
70	June 19	@ Giants	2–1	Cain (6–5)	Escobar (5–8)	Benítez (5)	39,594	31–39	AT&T Park		-7
71	June 20	@ Giants	3–2	Morris (5–7)	Lackey (4–5)	Benítez (6)	40,887	31–40	AT&T Park		-7
72	June 21	@ Giants	6–3	Shields (4–4)	Accardo (0–1)	Rodríguez (17)	40,900	32–40	AT&T Park		-7
73	June 23	@ Diamondbacks	8–2	Santana (8–3)	González (2–1)		23,682	33–40	Chase Field		-7
74	June 24	@ Diamondbacks	6–4	Donnelly (1–0)	Medders (1–2)	Rodríguez (18)	33,514	34–40	Chase Field		-6
75	June 25	@ Diamondbacks	9–7	Batista (7–5)	Escobar (5–9)	Julio (6)	24,788	34–41	Chase Field		-7
76	June 26	Rockies	5–4	Lackey (5–5)	Mesa (0–2)	Rodríguez (19)	43,781	35–41	Angel Stadium		-6 1/2
77	June 27	Rockies	12–4	Cook (6–7)	Jeff Weaver (3–10)		39,341	35–42	Angel Stadium		-6 1/2
78	June 28	Rockies	6–2	Ramírez (3–1)	Shields (4–5)		38,153	35–43	Angel Stadium		-6 1/2
79	June 30	Dodgers	6–1	Penny (9–2)	Colón (0–4)		44,233	35–44	Angel Stadium		-7

July (19–7)

#	Date	Opponent	Score	Win	Loss	Save	Attendance	Record	Stadium	Boxscore	GB
80	July 1	Dodgers	9–2	Escobar (6–9)	Hendrickson (4–9)		43,891	36–44	Angel Stadium		-6
81	July 2	Dodgers	4–0	Lackey (6–5)	Billingsley (0–2)		44,223	37–44	Angel Stadium		-5
82	July 3	@ Mariners	7–1	Jered Weaver (5–0)	Hernández (8–8)		30,641	38–44	Safeco Field		-5
83	July 4	@ Mariners	14–6	Santana (9–3)	Mateo (5–3)		30,857	39–44	Safeco Field		-5
84	July 5	@ Mariners	4–0	Colón (1–4)	Moyer (5–8)		25,008	40–44	Safeco Field		-4
85	July 6	@ Athletics	5–7	Street (2–3)	Shields (4–6)		14,673	40–45	McAfee Coliseum		-5
86	July 7	@ Athletics	3–0	Lackey (7–5)	Zito (8–6)		20,711	41–45	McAfee Coliseum		-4
87	July 8	@ Athletics	6–4	Jered Weaver (6–0)	Blanton (8–8)	Rodríguez (20)	25,289	42–45	McAfee Coliseum		-3
88	July 9	@ Athletics	4–2	Santana (10–3)	Haren (6–7)	Rodríguez (21)	26,603	43–45	McAfee Coliseum		-2
July 11: All-Star Game (AL wins, 3–2)				Ryan (TOR)	Hoffman (SD)	Rivera (NYY)	38,904		PNC Park	Pittsburgh, PA	
89	July 14	Devil Rays	4–0	Lackey (8–5)	Seo (2–7)		44,026	44–45	Angel Stadium		-2 1/2
90	July 15	Devil Rays	9–2	Santana (11–3)	Shields (4–3)		44,125	45–45	Angel Stadium		-1 1/2
91	July 16	Devil Rays	7–5	Shields (5–6)	Harville (0–2)	Rodríguez (22)	41,646	46–45	Angel Stadium		-1 1/2
92	July 17	Indians	10–5	Moseley (1–0)	Westbrook (7–5)		43,921	47–45	Angel Stadium		-1/2
93	July 18	Indians	7–5	Saunders (1–0)	Lee (9–7)	Rodríguez (23)	44,020	48–45	Angel Stadium		-1/2
94	July 19	Indians	6–4	Byrd (7–6)	Lackey (8–6)	Wickman (15)	43,744	48–46	Angel Stadium		-1 1/2
95	July 20	@ Royals	9–4	Dessens (5–7)	Gregg (2–3)		12,178	48–47	Kauffman Stadium		-2
96	July 21	@ Royals	8–3	Hernández (2–4)	Colón (1–5)		20,988	48–48	Kauffman Stadium		-2
97	July 22	@ Royals	4–3	Shields (6–6)	Wellemeyer (0–3)	Rodríguez (24)	26,873	49–48	Kauffman Stadium		-2
98	July 23	@ Royals	3–1	Jered Weaver (7–0)	Duckworth (1–4)	Rodríguez (25)	17,496	50–48	Kauffman Stadium		-1
99	July 24	@ Devil Rays	8–4	Lackey (9–6)	Seo (2–9)		11,020	51–48	Tropicana Field		0
100	July 25	@ Devil Rays	6–3	Switzer (2–1)	Santana (11–4)		11,253	51–49	Tropicana Field		0
101	July 26	@ Devil Rays	15–6	Gregg (3–3)	Fossum (4–4)		18,525	52–49	Tropicana Field		0
102	July 28	@ Red Sox	8–3	Escobar (7–9)	Lester (5–1)		36,109	53–49	Fenway Park		+1/2
103	July 29	@ Red Sox	7–6	Tavárez (2–3)	Carrasco (2–3)		35,621	53–50	Fenway Park		-1/2
104	July 30	@ Red Sox	10–4	Lackey (10–6)	Schilling (13–4)		36,048	54–50	Fenway Park		-1/2
105	July 31	Athletics	3–1	Haren (8–9)	Santana (11–5)		43,558	54–51	Angel Stadium		-1 1/2

August (16–13)

#	Date	Opponent	Score	Win	Loss	Save	Attendance	Record	Stadium	Boxscore	GB
106	August 1	Athletics	–	(–)	(–)			55–51	Angel Stadium		-1/2
107	August 2	Athletics	–	(–)	(–)			55–52	Angel Stadium		-1 1/2
108	August 3	Rangers	–	(–)	(–)			55–53	Angel Stadium		-2
109	August 4	Rangers	–	(–)	(–)			55–54	Angel Stadium		-3
110	August 5	Rangers	–	(–)	(–)			56–54	Angel Stadium		-3
111	August 6	Rangers	–	(–)	(–)			57–54	Angel Stadium		-3
112	August 7	@ White Sox	–	(–)	(–)			58–54	U.S. Cellular Field		-3
113	August 8	@ Indians	–	(–)	(–)			59–54	Jacobs Field		-3
114	August 9	@ Indians	–	(–)	(–)			59–55	Jacobs Field		-3
115	August 10	@ Indians	–	(–)	(–)			59–56	Jacobs Field		-3 1/2
116	August 11	@ Yankees	–	(–)	(–)			60–56	Yankee Stadium		-3 1/2
117	August 12	@ Yankees	–	(–)	(–)			60–57	Yankee Stadium		-4 1/2
118	August 13	@ Yankees	–	(–)	(–)			61–57	Yankee Stadium		-4 1/2
119	August 14	@ Yankees	–	(–)	(–)			61–58	Yankee Stadium		-5 1/2
120	August 15	@ Rangers	–	(–)	(–)			62–58	Ameriquest Field in Arlington		-5 1/2
121	August 16	@ Rangers	–	(–)	(–)			62–59	Ameriquest Field in Arlington		-6 1/2
122	August 17	Mariners	–	(–)	(–)			63–59	Angel Stadium		-6
123	August 18	Mariners	–	(–)	(–)			64–59	Angel Stadium		-4 1/2
124	August 19	Mariners	–	(–)	(–)			65–59	Angel Stadium		-4 1/2
125	August 20	Mariners	–	(–)	(–)			66–59	Angel Stadium		-4 1/2
126	August 22	Red Sox	–	(–)	(–)			67–59	Angel Stadium		-4
127	August 23	Red Sox	–	(–)	(–)			67–60	Angel Stadium		-5
128	August 24	Red Sox	–	(–)	(–)			67–61	Angel Stadium		-5 1/2
129	August 25	Yankees	–	(–)	(–)			68–61	Angel Stadium		-5 1/2
130	August 26	Yankees	–	(–)	(–)			69–61	Angel Stadium		-5 1/2
131	August 27	Yankees	–	(–)	(–)			69–62	Angel Stadium		-5 1/2
132	August 28	@ Mariners	–	(–)	(–)			69–63	Safeco Field		-6 1/2
133	August 29	@ Mariners	–	(–)	(–)			69–64	Safeco Field		-7 1/2
134	August 30	@ Mariners	–	(–)	(–)			70–64	Safeco Field		-7 1/2

September (19–8)

#	Date	Opponent	Score	Win	Loss	Save	Attendance	Record	Stadium	Boxscore	GB
135	September 1	@ Tigers	–	(–)	(–)			70–65	Comerica Park		-8 1/2
136	September 2	@ Tigers	–	(–)	(–)			71–65	Comerica Park		-7 1/2
137	September 3	@ Tigers	–	(–)	(–)			72–65	Comerica Park		-7 1/2
138	September 4	Orioles	–	(–)	(–)			73–65	Angel Stadium		-6 1/2
139	September 5	Orioles	–	(–)	(–)			74–65	Angel Stadium		-5 1/2
140	September 6	Orioles	–	(–)	(–)			75–65	Angel Stadium		-5 1/2
141	September 8	Blue Jays	–	(–)	(–)			76–65	Angel Stadium		-5 1/2
142	September 9	Blue Jays	–	(–)	(–)			76–66	Angel Stadium		-5 1/2
143	September 10	Blue Jays	–	(–)	(–)			77–66	Angel Stadium		-5 1/2
144	September 11	White Sox	–	(–)	(–)			77–67	Angel Stadium		-5 1/2
145	September 12	White Sox	–	(–)	(–)			78–67	Angel Stadium		-5 1/2
146	September 13	White Sox	–	(–)	(–)			78–68	Angel Stadium		-5 1/2
147	September 14	@ Rangers	–	(–)	(–)			79–68	Ameriquest Field in Arlington		-5
148	September 15	@ Rangers	–	(–)	(–)			80–68	Ameriquest Field in Arlington		-5
149	September 16	@ Rangers	–	(–)	(–)			80–69	Ameriquest Field in Arlington		-6
150	September 17	@ Rangers	–	(–)	(–)			80–70	Ameriquest Field in Arlington		-7
151	September 19	@ Royals	–	(–)	(–)			81–70	Kauffman Stadium		-6 1/2
152	September 20	@ Royals	–	(–)	(–)			82–70	Kauffman Stadium		-6 1/2
153	September 22	@ Athletics	–	(–)	(–)			82–71	McAfee Coliseum		-8
154	September 23	@ Athletics	–	(–)	(–)			83–71	McAfee Coliseum		-7
155	WC E-September 24	@ Athletics	–	(–)	(–)			84–71	McAfee Coliseum		-6
156	September 25	Rangers	–	(–)	(–)			85–71	Angel Stadium		-5
157	E-September 26	Rangers	–	(–)	(–)			85–72	Angel Stadium		-6
158	September 27	Rangers	–	(–)	(–)			86–72	Angel Stadium		-6
159	September 28	Athletics	–	(–)	(–)			87–72	Angel Stadium		-5
160	September 29	Athletics	–	(–)	(–)			88–72	Angel Stadium		-4
161	September 30	Athletics	–	(–)	(–)			89–72	Angel Stadium		-3

October (0–1)

#	Date	Opponent	Score	Win	Loss	Save	Attendance	Record	Stadium	Boxscore	GB
162	October 1	Athletics	–	(–)	(–)			89–73	Angel Stadium		-4

Legend
Angels win	Angels loss	All-Star Game	Game postponed

"GB" legend
1st (AL West)	Not in playoff berth	1st (AL Wild Card)	Tied for 1st (AL West)

== Player stats ==
=== Batting ===
==== Starters by position ====
Note: Pos = Position; G = Games played; AB = At bats; H = Hits; Avg. = Batting average; HR = Home runs; RBI = Runs batted in

Pos	Player	G	AB	H	Avg.	HR	RBI
C	Mike Napoli	99	268	61	.228	16	42
1B	Kendrys Morales	57	197	46	.234	5	22
2B	Adam Kennedy	139	451	123	.273	4	55
SS	Orlando Cabrera	153	607	171	.282	9	72
3B	Maicer Izturis	104	352	103	.293	5	44
LF	Garret Anderson	141	543	152	.280	17	85
CF	Chone Figgins	155	604	161	.267	9	62
RF	Vladimir Guerrero	156	607	200	.329	33	116
DH	Tim Salmon	76	211	56	.265	9	27

==== Other batters ====
Note: G = Games played; AB = At bats; H = Hits; Avg. = Batting average; HR = Home runs; RBI = Runs batted in

Player	G	AB	H	Avg.	HR	RBI
Juan Rivera	124	448	139	.310	23	85
Howie Kendrick	72	267	76	.285	4	30
Robb Quinlan	86	234	75	.321	9	32
José Molina	78	225	54	.240	4	22
Dallas McPherson	40	115	30	.261	7	13
Darin Erstad	40	95	21	.221	0	5
Casey Kotchman	29	79	12	.152	1	6
Tommy Murphy	48	70	16	.229	1	6
Jeff Mathis	23	55	8	.145	2	6
Edgardo Alfonzo	18	50	5	.100	0	1
Reggie Willits	28	45	12	.267	0	1
Erick Aybar	34	40	10	.250	0	2
Curtis Pride	22	27	6	.222	1	2

=== Pitching ===
==== Starting and other pitchers ====
Note: G = Games pitched; IP = Innings pitched; W = Wins; L = Losses; ERA = Earned run average; SO = Strikeouts

Player	G	IP	W	L	ERA	SO
John Lackey	33	217.2	13	11	3.56	190
Ervin Santana	33	204.0	16	8	4.28	141
Kelvim Escobar	30	189.1	11	14	3.61	147
Jered Weaver	19	123.0	11	2	2.56	105
Jeff Weaver	16	88.2	3	10	6.29	62
Joe Saunders	13	70.2	7	3	4.71	51
Bartolo Colón	10	56.1	1	5	5.11	31
Dustin Moseley	3	11.0	1	0	9.00	3

==== Relief pitchers ====
Note: G = Games pitched; W = Wins; L = Losses; SV = Saves; ERA = Earned run average; SO = Strikeouts

Player	G	W	L	SV	ERA	SO
Francisco Rodríguez	69	2	3	47	1.73	98
Scot Shields	74	7	7	2	2.87	84
J.C. Romero	65	1	2	0	6.70	31
Brendan Donnelly	62	6	0	0	3.94	53
Héctor Carrasco	56	7	3	1	3.41	72
Kevin Gregg	32	3	4	0	4.14	71
Esteban Yan	13	0	0	0	6.85	16
Chris Bootcheck	7	0	1	0	10.45	7
Greg Jones	5	0	0	0	6.00	1
Jason Bulger	2	0	0	0	16.20	1

== Farm system ==
Level	Team	League	Manager
AAA	Salt Lake Bees	Pacific Coast League	Brian Harper
AA	Arkansas Travelers	Texas League	Tyrone Boykin
A	Rancho Cucamonga Quakes	California League	Bobby Mitchell
A	Cedar Rapids Kernels	Midwest League	Bobby Magallanes
Rookie	AZL Angels	Arizona League	Ever Magallanes
Rookie	Orem Owlz	Pioneer League	Tom Kotchman

== See also ==
- Los Angeles Angels
- Angel Stadium
- 2006 MLB season

=== Other Anaheim-based teams in 2006 ===
- Mighty Ducks of Anaheim/Anaheim Ducks (Arrowhead Pond/Honda Center)
  - 2005–06 Mighty Ducks of Anaheim season
  - 2006–07 Anaheim Ducks season

Records
Preceded by 2005	Los Angeles Angels seasons 2006	Succeeded by 2007
