= Mike Rouse =

American baseball player (born 1980)

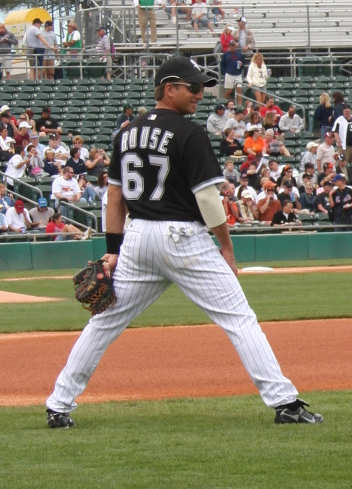
- Infielder
- Born: April 25, 1980 (age 45); San Jose, California
- Batted: Left Threw: Right

MLB debut
- June 6, 2006, for the Oakland Athletics

Last MLB appearance
- August 4, 2007, for the Cleveland Indians

MLB statistics
- Batting average: .165
- Home runs: 0
- Runs batted in: 6
- Stats at Baseball Reference

Teams
- Oakland Athletics (2006); Cleveland Indians (2007)

Michael Gregory Rouse (born April 25, 1980) is an American former infielder who played in Major League Baseball (MLB) in 2006 and 2007.

== Amateur career ==
Rouse grew up in San Jose and attended Gunderson High School and Valley Christian High School. He initially played baseball for San Jose State University before transferring to Cal State-Fullerton. In his final collegiate season for the Titans, he was named to the all Big West team after hitting .377 with 12 home runs and 62 RBI. In 2000, he played collegiate summer baseball with the Brewster Whitecaps of the Cape Cod Baseball League.

== Professional career ==
He was drafted in the 5th round of the 2001 Major League Baseball draft by the Toronto Blue Jays. Rouse was traded to the Oakland Athletics prior to the 2003 season.

His major league debut was memorable as he went 3-3 in legendary Yankee Stadium to help the Athletics gain a victory over New York on June 9, 2006. However, on September 5 of that year, Rouse was designated for assignment. On September 13, Rouse was claimed off of waivers by the Indians. He made the Indians club in 2007 as the team's utility infielder. However, despite providing a reliable glove in the infield, he batted just .115 at the plate, and on August 6, 2007, he was designated for assignment.

Rouse signed a minor league contract with the Chicago White Sox on January 12, 2008, but was traded during the season to the Philadelphia Phillies. He retired at the end of the season.
