= Ron Flores =

American baseball player (born 1979)

- Relief pitcher
- Born: August 9, 1979 (age 47); Whittier, California, U.S.
- Batted: Left Threw: Left

MLB debut
- June 17, 2005, for the Oakland Athletics

Last MLB appearance
- July 2, 2007, for the Oakland Athletics

MLB statistics
- Win–loss record: 1–4
- Earned run average: 3.05
- Strikeouts: 41
- Stats at Baseball Reference

Teams
- Oakland Athletics (2005–2007)

Ronald Joel Flores (born August 9, 1979) is an American former Major League Baseball (MLB) left-handed relief pitcher who played with the Oakland Athletics from 2005 to 2007.

== Amateur career ==
A native of Whittier, California, Flores graduated from El Rancho High School in Pico Rivera, California and is the younger brother of fellow major leaguer Randy Flores. He went on to attend the University of Southern California (USC), playing college baseball for the Trojans from 1998 to 2001. Flores was a member of USC's 1998 national championship baseball team, and earned a Bachelor of Science degree in economics from USC. After the 1998 season, he played collegiate summer baseball with the Chatham A's of the Cape Cod Baseball League.

== Professional career ==
The Oakland Athletics selected Flores in the 29th round (870th overall pick) of the 2000 Major League Baseball draft. In limited appearances with Oakland, Flores was mostly the second or third lefty in the bullpen. He pitched a career-high four shutout innings for his first big league win on June 29, 2006 against the San Diego Padres. His first major league save came after he pitched a scoreless 10th inning in the final game of the 2006 season.

On December 12, 2007, Flores signed a minor league contract with the St. Louis Cardinals, uniting him with older brother Randy. He became a free agent at the end of the season and signed a minor league contract with the Cincinnati Reds, only to be released by the organization on April 1, 2009. After being released by the Reds, Flores signed with the independent Long Island Ducks. He pitched in 53 games for them before retiring.
