= John Koronka =

American baseball player (born 1980)

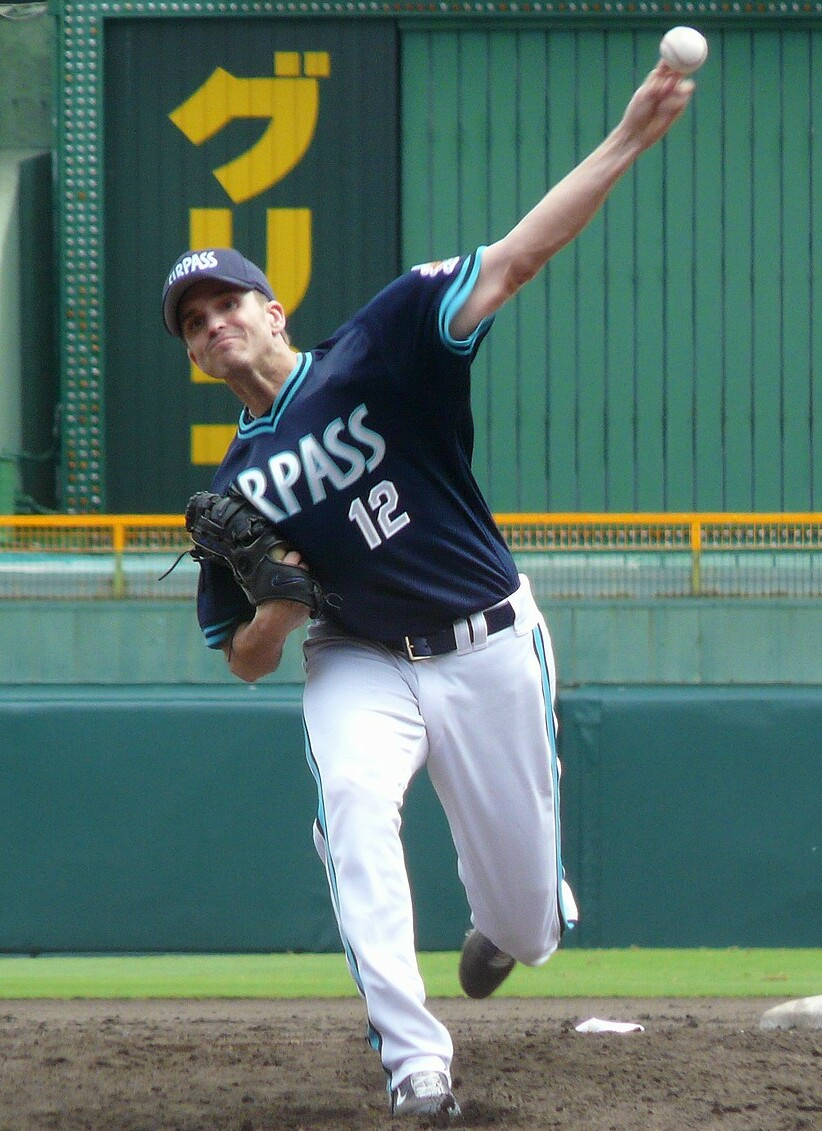
- Koronka with the Orix Buffaloes in 2008

Embry–Riddle Eagles
- Starting pitcher / Coach
- Born: July 3, 1980 (age 46); Clearwater, Florida, U.S.
- Batted: Left Threw: Left

Professional debut
- MLB: June 1, 2005, for the Chicago Cubs
- NPB: July 27, 2008, for the Orix Buffaloes

Last appearance
- NPB: August 19, 2008, for the Orix Buffaloes
- MLB: May 17, 2009, for the Florida Marlins

MLB statistics
- Win–loss record: 8–13
- Earned run average: 6.25
- Strikeouts: 77

NPB statistics
- Win–loss record: 0–1
- Earned run average: 6.75
- Strikeouts: 11
- Stats at Baseball Reference

Teams
- Chicago Cubs (2005); Texas Rangers (2006–2007); Orix Buffaloes (2008); Florida Marlins (2009)

John Vincent Koronka (born July 3, 1980) is an American former professional baseball pitcher, who played in Major League Baseball (MLB) for the Chicago Cubs, Texas Rangers, and Florida Marlins. He also played in Nippon Professional Baseball (NPB) for the Orix Buffaloes.

== Playing career ==
=== Cincinnati Reds ===
Koronka was selected by the Cincinnati Reds in the 12th round of the 1998 MLB draft. While playing in the Reds farm system with the Stockton Ports in 2002, he was named to the California League All-Star team. On December 16, 2002, he was selected by the Texas Rangers in the Rule 5 Draft but did not make the Rangers opening day roster and was returned to the Reds on March 21, 2003.

=== Chicago Cubs ===
Koronka was traded by the Reds to the Chicago Cubs on August 26, 2003, for Phil Norton. He made his major league debut for the Cubs on June 1, 2005 against the Los Angeles Dodgers and gave up 3 runs over 5 innings, walked 3, and struck out 5 for the win.

=== Texas Rangers ===
On March 31, 2006, Koronka was traded to the Texas Rangers for Freddie Bynum, whom the Rangers had just acquired from the Oakland Athletics. Koronka started 23 games for the Rangers in 2006, going 7–7 with a 5.69 ERA. He was expected to compete for a spot on the rotation in 2007, but failed to make the Rangers' big league roster. He was optioned to the Triple-A Oklahoma RedHawks prior to the start of the 2007 season.

Koronka made two starts in 2007 for the Rangers going 0–2 with a 7.84 ERA.

=== Cleveland Indians ===
He was designated for assignment on July 1, 2007, and subsequently claimed off outright waivers on July 9, 2007, by the Cleveland Indians. He was assigned to their Triple-A team, the Buffalo Bisons. With the Bisons, he made 9 starts and went 3–3 with a 3.54 ERA.

On September 1, 2007, he was designated for assignment and outrighted to the minor leagues on September 12. Koronka opted for minor league free agency on November 3, 2007.

=== Colorado Rockies/Orix Buffaloes ===
On December 21, 2007, the Colorado Rockies signed Koronka to a minor league contract with an invitation to spring training. He was 5–3 in 13 appearances (12 starts) for the Colorado Springs Sky Sox. On June 23, 2008, the Rockies released Koronka so he could sign with a Japanese team, the Orix Buffaloes. He started 3 games for the Buffaloes, finishing 0–1 with a 6.75 E.R.A..

=== Florida Marlins ===
On January 13, 2009, Koronka signed a minor league deal with the Florida Marlins. He started two games for the Marlins (0-2, 11.75 E.R.A.) and spent most of the season with the New Orleans Zephyrs. He was granted free agency on October 8, 2009.

=== Los Angeles Dodgers ===
On January 28, 2010, Koronka signed a minor league contract with the Los Angeles Dodgers with an invite to spring training. He began 2010 with the Chattanooga Lookouts in the Double-A Southern League. After seven starts with the Lookouts he was promoted to the AAA Albuquerque Isotopes. He made one start with the Isotopes, allowing eight runs in 1 1/3 innings. He was released on June 2.

=== Lancaster Barnstormers ===
On July 26, 2010, Koronka signed a contract with the Lancaster Barnstormers of the Atlantic League of Professional Baseball. He was released on August 3, 2010. In 2 games 2.1 innings of relief he went 0-0 with a horrible 19.29 ERA and 3 strikeouts.

=== Southern Maryland Blue Crabs ===
On August 7, 2010, Koronka signed with the Southern Maryland Blue Crabs of the Atlantic League of Professional Baseball. He became a free agent following the season. In 6 games (5 starts) throwing 15.1 innings he went 0-4 with a horrific 11.74 ERA and 14 strikeouts.

=== Lancaster Barnstormers (second stint) ===
On March 8, 2011, Koronka signed with the Lancaster Barnstormers of the Atlantic League of Professional Baseball. He appeared in 2 games (1 start) throwing 1 inning going 0-0 with a 0.00 ERA and 0 strikeouts. He was released on April 17.

== Post-playing career ==
Koronka worked for the Chicago Cubs as a regional scout in charge of Florida from 2011 to 2020.

In March 2021, Koronka was hired as an assistant coach for the Embry–Riddle Eagles baseball program.
