= D'Angelo Jiménez =

Dominican baseball player (born 1977)

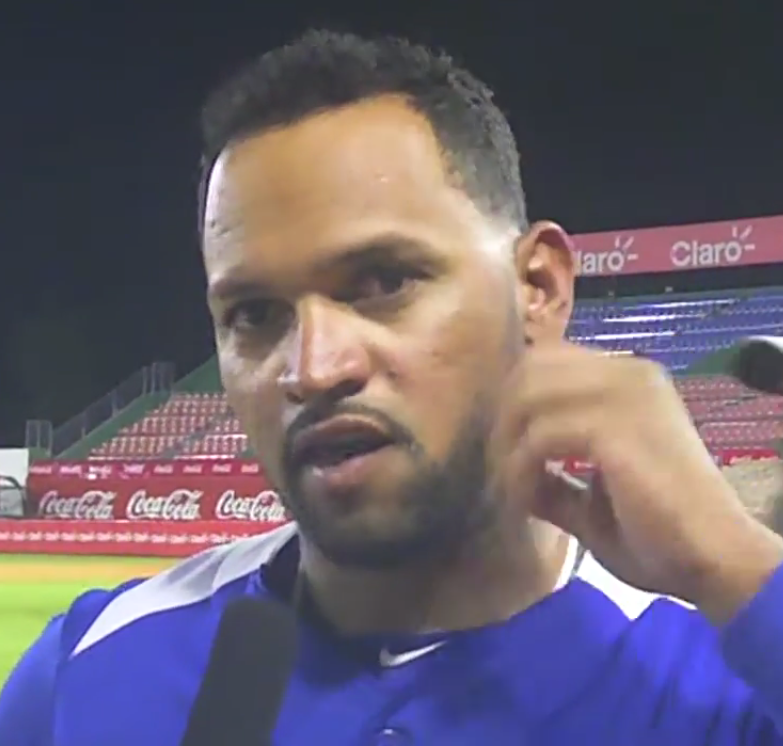
- Jiménez with Tigres del Licey in 2013
- Second baseman
- Born: December 21, 1977 (age 48); Santo Domingo, Dominican Republic
- Batted: Switch Threw: Right

MLB debut
- September 15, 1999, for the New York Yankees

Last MLB appearance
- September 29, 2007, for the Washington Nationals

MLB statistics
- Batting average: .263
- Home runs: 36
- Runs batted in: 228
- Stats at Baseball Reference

Teams
- New York Yankees (1999); San Diego Padres (2001–2002); Chicago White Sox (2002–2003); Cincinnati Reds (2003–2005); Texas Rangers (2006); Oakland Athletics (2006); Washington Nationals (2007)

D'Angelo Jiménez (born December 21, 1977) is a Dominican former professional baseball infielder who played primarily at second base. He played in Major League Baseball (MLB) for the New York Yankees, San Diego Padres, Chicago White Sox, Cincinnati Reds, Texas Rangers, Oakland Athletics, and Washington Nationals.

== Playing career ==
He made his major league debut with the New York Yankees in 1999. He had been considered one of the Yankees' top prospects, but in early 2000 Jiménez injured his back in a car crash that required him to miss the 2000 season.

In 2002, Jiménez appeared in a game as a pitcher for the San Diego Padres. He pitched 1 1/3 innings, allowing no hits and no runs. On October 23, 2006, Jiménez was released by the Oakland Athletics making him a free agent.

Jiménez started 2007 with the Triple-A Columbus Clippers. The Washington Nationals purchased his contract on April 4, 2007. He appeared primarily as a pinch-hitter and defensive replacement, but he was not a successful hitter. On July 19, 2007, Jimenez was called as a pinch hitter and drove in the game-winning single after being in a horrible slump batting .040.

He signed a minor league contract with the St. Louis Cardinals on December 19, 2007, and became a free agent at the end of the season. On April 17, 2009 Jimenez signed a minor league deal with the New York Yankees. Later in the year he played for the Newark Bears of the Atlantic League On June 19, 2010, he signed with the Minnesota Twins and was assigned to the Rochester Red Wings. Previously, he was playing baseball in Mexico. Jimenez played with the Lincoln Saltdogs of the American Association of Independent Professional Baseball during the 2012 season. He spent 2013 with the Camden Riversharks of the Atlantic League.

== Coaching career ==
On February 5, 2024, Jiménez was hired by the Chicago Cubs to serve as the bench coach for the team's Single–A affiliate, the Myrtle Beach Pelicans.
