= Akinori Otsuka =

Japanese baseball player (born 1972)

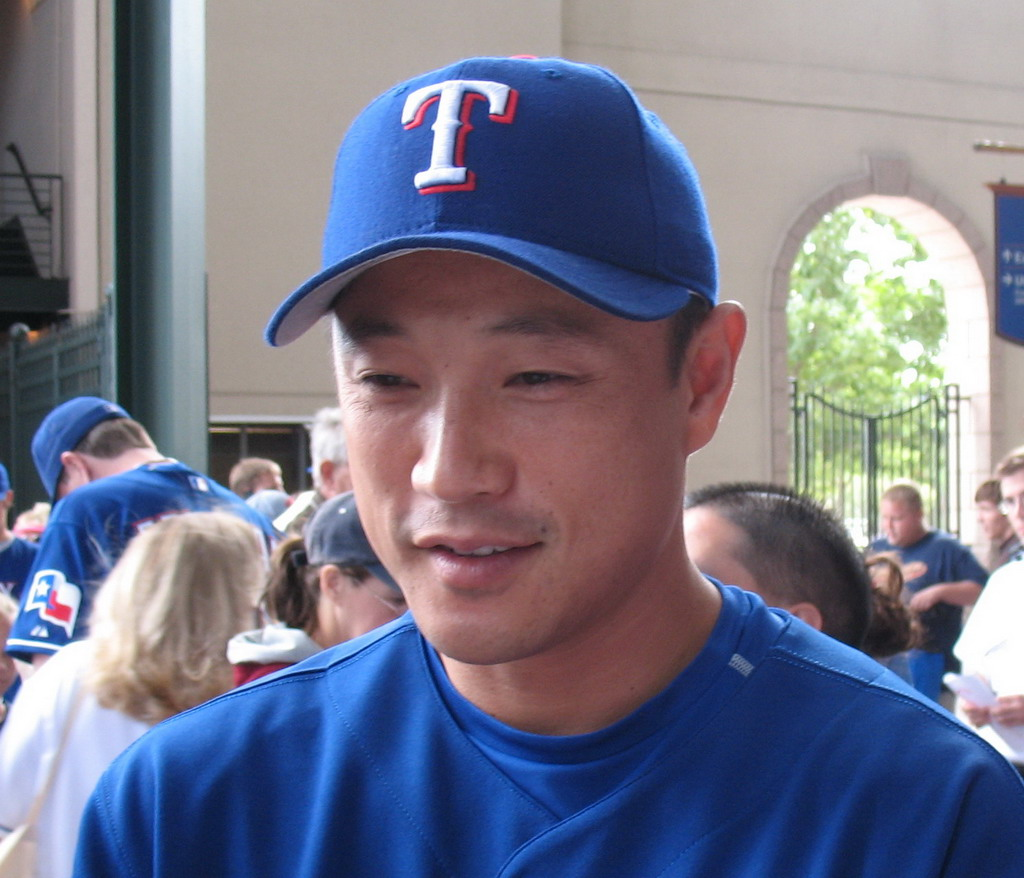
- Otsuka with the Texas Rangers

Chunichi Dragons – No. 76
- Pitcher / Coach
- Born: January 13, 1972 (age 54); Chiba, Japan
- Batted: Right Threw: Right

Professional debut
- NPB: May 13, 1997, for the Kintetsu Buffaloes
- MLB: April 6, 2004, for the San Diego Padres

Last appearance
- NPB: 2003, for the Chunichi Dragons
- MLB: July 1, 2007, for the Texas Rangers

NPB statistics
- Win–loss record: 14–23
- Earned run average: 2.39
- Strikeouts: 474
- Saves: 137

MLB statistics
- Win–loss record: 13–15
- Earned run average: 2.44
- Strikeouts: 217
- Saves: 39
- Stats at Baseball Reference

Teams
- As player: Kintetsu / Osaka Kintetsu Buffaloes (1997–2002); Chunichi Dragons (2003); San Diego Padres (2004–2005); Texas Rangers (2006–2007); As coach: Shinano Grandserows (2014); Chunichi Dragons (2015–2017); El Paso Chihuahuas (2017–2022); Chunichi Dragons (2022–Present)
Medals
Representing Japan
Men's baseball
World Baseball Classic
Gold medal – first place	2006 San Diego	Team

Akinori Otsuka (Japanese: 大塚 晶則, Hepburn: Ōtsuka Akinori; born January 13, 1972) is a Japanese former baseball pitcher who coaches for the Chunichi Dragons in Nippon Professional Baseball. He was the setup man for the San Diego Padres and the Texas Rangers. He was also the closer for Japan's 2006 World Baseball Classic–winning team.

Otsuka threw a low-90's 4-seam fastball (tops out at about 94 mph) that is very straight, along with a hard, late-breaking slider. He employed an unorthodox pitching delivery wherein he lifted his lead leg up very slowly, tapped his glove, then fired to home plate, making his pitches look faster coming out of his hand and thus harder to pick up.

== MLB career ==
=== San Diego Padres ===
Otsuka came to the United States after several years of pitching in the Japanese League when his former team, the Chunichi Dragons, used the posting system to solicit bids from MLB clubs for the right to negotiate with him. The Padres made the winning bid and signed him to a three-year contract on December 9, 2003.

Otsuka made his major league debut April 6, 2004 against the Los Angeles Dodgers, earning the loss after giving up a walk-off single to Robin Ventura. He struck out Paul Lo Duca for his first major league strikeout.

On January 6, 2006, Otsuka was traded to the Rangers, along with pitcher Adam Eaton and minor league catcher Billy Killian, in exchange for pitcher Chris Young, first baseman Adrián González, and outfielder Terrmel Sledge.

=== Texas Rangers ===
Otsuka took over the role as the closer for the Rangers during the 2006 season, replacing Francisco Cordero, and recorded 32 saves while posting a 2.11 ERA. However, on December 19, 2006, the Rangers announced that newly signed Éric Gagné would take over the closer role in 2007, with Otsuka moving back into a setup role. On January 13, 2007, T. R. Sullivan reported that, in an interview in Japan, Otsuka said "If there is the team which needs me as a closer, I am going to think about (the trade)". Due to Gagné starting the season on the DL, Otsuka began the 2007 season as the closer. With the trade of Gagne to the Boston Red Sox, Otsuka assumed the closer's role again. However, Otsuka went on the DL after experiencing tightness in his throwing shoulder. His stand-in was C. J. Wilson. Otsuka was not offered a new contract by the Rangers and became a free agent on December 12, 2007.

== Post MLB and Retirement ==
On January 10, 2008, Otsuka announced that he would undergo elbow surgery.

=== Shinano Grandserows ===
Otsuka was the player-manager of the Shinano Grandserows of the Japanese Baseball Challenge League from 2012 to 2014. The team held his retirement ceremony on September 15, 2014.

== Coaching career ==
=== Chunichi Dragons ===
Otsuka returned to the Chunichi Dragons on 3 October 2015 as one of the second team pitching coaches.

In 2016, with first team pitching coach Shinichi Kondoh on leave to have hernia surgery, Otsuka helped lead the first team pitchers in spring camp. He however returned to working with the second team following Kondoh's return. On 26 September, Otsuka was unveiled as the pitching coach for the U-23 Japanese national team for the 2016 WBSC U-23 World Cup.

=== San Diego Padres ===
Otsuka rejoined the Padres organization in 2017 when he was announced as the bullpen coach of the El Paso Chihuahuas, the AAA affiliate of the Padres.

== Personal life ==
Otsuka and his wife, Akemi, have one son, Toranosuke, and one daughter, Hikaru.
