= Kiko Calero =

Puerto Rican baseball player (born 1975)

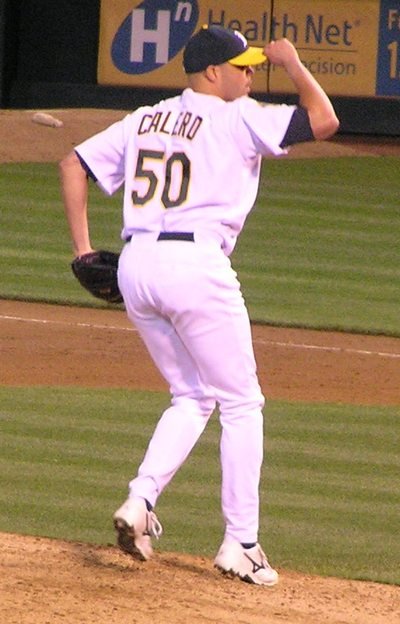
- Calero with the Oakland Athletics
- Relief pitcher
- Born: January 9, 1975 (age 50); Santurce, Puerto Rico
- Batted: Right Threw: Right

MLB debut
- April 2, 2003, for the St. Louis Cardinals

Last MLB appearance
- October 4, 2009, for the Florida Marlins

MLB statistics
- Win–loss record: 14–12
- Earned run average: 3.24
- Strikeouts: 324
- Stats at Baseball Reference

Teams
- St. Louis Cardinals (2003–2004); Oakland Athletics (2005–2008); Florida Marlins (2009)

Enrique Nomar "Kiko" Calero (born January 9, 1975) is a Puerto Rican former Major League Baseball relief pitcher.

== Professional career ==
Calero is a graduated from University Gardens High School in Puerto Rico and attended Miami-Dade College Kendall Campus. He was drafted by the Detroit Tigers in the 41st round (1142nd overall) of the 1994 Major League Baseball draft, but Calero did not sign with the Tigers. Instead he attended St. Thomas University (Florida) and was drafted again in the 1996 Major League Baseball draft, when he was picked in the 27th round (799th overall) by the Kansas City Royals.

=== Kansas City Royals ===
Mainly a starting pitcher in the Royals minor league organization, he spent 6 years at the Single-A and Double-A levels before finally reaching Triple-A Omaha in 2002. During his minor league career, Calero excelled for the Royals organization. In 1996, he finished fourth in the Single-A Northwest League in ERA. He was also named to the Texas League All Star team in 1997. Through 2000, Calero had 31 wins in a Wrangler uniform and worked as a reliever in 2001 after 105 starts. The Royals traded Calero to the Philadelphia Phillies for shortstop Brian Harris in 2002 but was returned to the Royals and granted free agency.

=== St. Louis Cardinals ===
Calero was subsequently signed as a free agent by the St. Louis Cardinals. He made his Major League debut on April 2, 2003, for the Cards against the Milwaukee Brewers, he worked two thirds of an inning, allowing two hits and one walk but no runs. He spent all of 2003 and most of 2004 in the majors. He played all but one game as a reliever. He was a member of the 2004 St. Louis Cardinals' team that went on to win the National League title and played in the 2004 World Series.

=== Oakland Athletics ===
After the 2004 season, Calero was traded from the Cardinals along with starting pitcher Dan Haren and top-hitting prospect Daric Barton to the Oakland Athletics for Mark Mulder.

=== Texas Rangers ===
On July 4, 2008, After being designated for assignment and released by the Athletics, Calero signed with the Texas Rangers. The Rangers signed Calero to a minor league contract and assigned him to Triple-A Oklahoma, where he spent the rest of the season.

=== Florida Marlins ===
Calero signed a minor league contract with an invitation to spring training with the Florida Marlins in January 2009. He made the team out of spring training, and was added to the major league roster on April 4. He became a free agent following the season.

=== New York Mets/Los Angeles Dodgers ===
On March 4, 2010, the New York Mets signed Calero to a minor-league deal with an invitation to spring training. On May 16, he was released by the Mets and he signed with the Los Angeles Dodgers on June 10 and was assigned to the AAA Albuquerque Isotopes. He appeared in 15 games for the Isotopes before they also released him.

== Overseas career ==
Calero has also played on several other teams. He played from 1996 to 2000 with the Indios de Mayagüez (Mayagüez Indians) in the Puerto Rican Professional Baseball League. During those years, he went on to win two national titles and three participations on the Serie del Caribe. In 1996, Calero was named Rookie of the Year, and he also was selected to participate on three all-star games, during his playing year with the Indios de Mayagüez. Kiko also played on the MLB team at the Major League Baseball Japan All-Star Series played in Japan in 2004. He was also a member of the 2006 Puerto Rico national baseball team at the World Baseball Classic.

== Personal life ==
Calero is married to Carola Rodriguez and they have two children.

== See also ==
- List of Major League Baseball players from Puerto Rico
