= Francisco Cordero =

Dominican baseball player (born 1975)

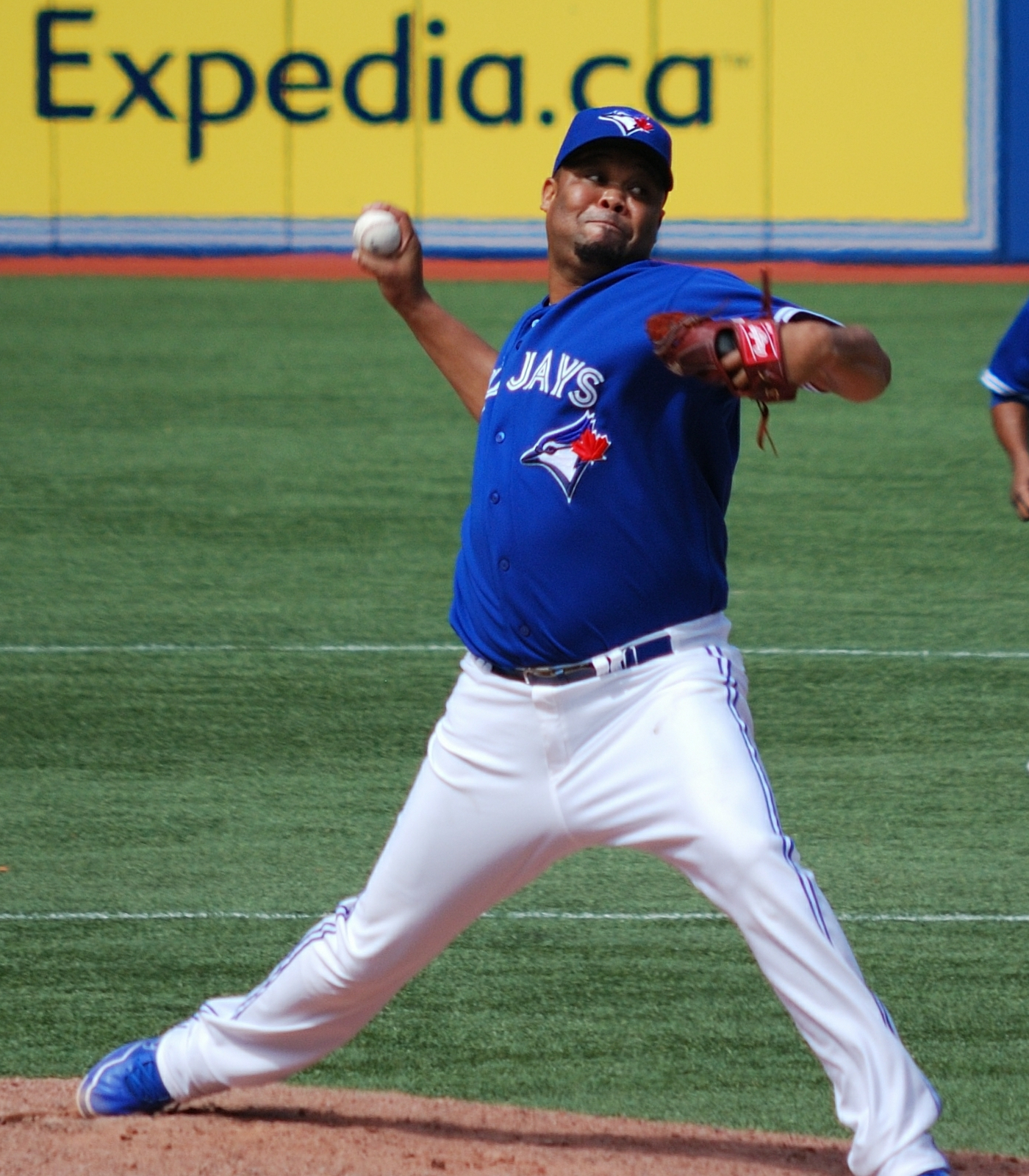
- Cordero with the Toronto Blue Jays
- Pitcher
- Born: May 11, 1975 (age 51); Santo Domingo, Dominican Republic
- Batted: Right Threw: Right

MLB debut
- August 2, 1999, for the Detroit Tigers

Last MLB appearance
- August 1, 2012, for the Houston Astros

MLB statistics
- Win–loss record: 47–53
- Earned run average: 3.38
- Strikeouts: 796
- Saves: 329
- Stats at Baseball Reference

Teams
- Detroit Tigers (1999); Texas Rangers (2000–2006); Milwaukee Brewers (2006–2007); Cincinnati Reds (2008–2011); Toronto Blue Jays (2012); Houston Astros (2012)

Career highlights and awards
- 3× All-Star (2004, 2007, 2009)

Francisco Javier Cordero (born May 11, 1975) is a Dominican former professional baseball pitcher. He played in Major League Baseball (MLB) for the Detroit Tigers, Texas Rangers, Milwaukee Brewers, Cincinnati Reds, Toronto Blue Jays, and Houston Astros from 1999 through 2012, often serving as the closer. On June 1, 2011, Cordero recorded his 300th career save with the Reds, becoming only the 22nd player to reach that mark. He completed his major league career with 329 saves and is a three-time MLB All-Star.

Cordero is frequently referred to by his nickname, CoCo, which is a combination of the last two letters of his first name and the first two letters of his last name. Cordero's arsenal featured a mid-90s fastball and wipe-out slider. He attended Colegio Luz Arroyo Hondo High School in the Dominican Republic.

== Playing career ==
=== Detroit Tigers ===
Cordero made his first appearance in the Tigers organization with the Jamestown Jammers of the New York–Penn League in 1995, appearing in 19 games, making 18 starts, and pitching to a 4–10 win–loss record with a 5.42 earned run average (ERA) in 108 innings pitched. Cordero then finished the 1995 season with the Fayetteville Generals of South Atlantic League, going 0–3 with a 6.30 ERA in four starts.

Cordero suffered through an injury plagued 1996 season, as he made only two starts with the Jammers, going 0–0 with a 0.82 ERA in 11 innings pitched, then with the Generals, he appeared in two games, making one start, going 0–0 with a 2.57 ERA in seven innings pitched. He played the entire 1997 season with the West Michigan Whitecaps of the Midwest League, where Cordero was converted into a closing pitcher. In 50 games, Cordero had an excellent season, going 6–1 with a 0.99 ERA in 54.1 innings pitched, earning 35 saves.

Cordero began the 1998 season with the Lakeland Tigers of the Florida State League, appearing in just one game, allowing a hit to the only batter he faced before moving up to the Jacksonville Suns of the Southern League. In Jacksonville, Cordero appeared in 17 games, going 1–1 with a 4.86 ERA while earning eight saves. He returned to Jacksonville for the 1999 season, as Cordero appeared in 47 games, going 4–1 with a 1.38 ERA while earning 27 saves with the Suns before earning a call-up to the Detroit Tigers.

Cordero made his MLB debut on August 2, 1999, pitching the ninth inning against the Chicago White Sox at Tiger Stadium. The first batter he faced was Chris Singleton, who grounded out. After Frank Thomas hit a single, Cordero managed to strikeout both Magglio Ordóñez and Brian Simmons to end the inning. The White Sox ended up winning the game 6–2. Cordero earned his first MLB victory on August 31, 1999, in a 14–6 win over the Texas Rangers. He finished the season with a 2–2 record and a 3.32 ERA in 20 games out of the bullpen. On September 27, 1999, Cordero transported the home plate of the old Tiger Stadium after the last game played there to Comerica Park along with pitchers Matt Anderson and Jeff Weaver.

On November 2, 1999, the Tigers traded Cordero, Frank Catalanotto, Bill Haselman, Gabe Kapler, Justin Thompson and Alan Webb to the Texas Rangers for Juan González, Danny Patterson and Gregg Zaun.

=== Texas Rangers ===
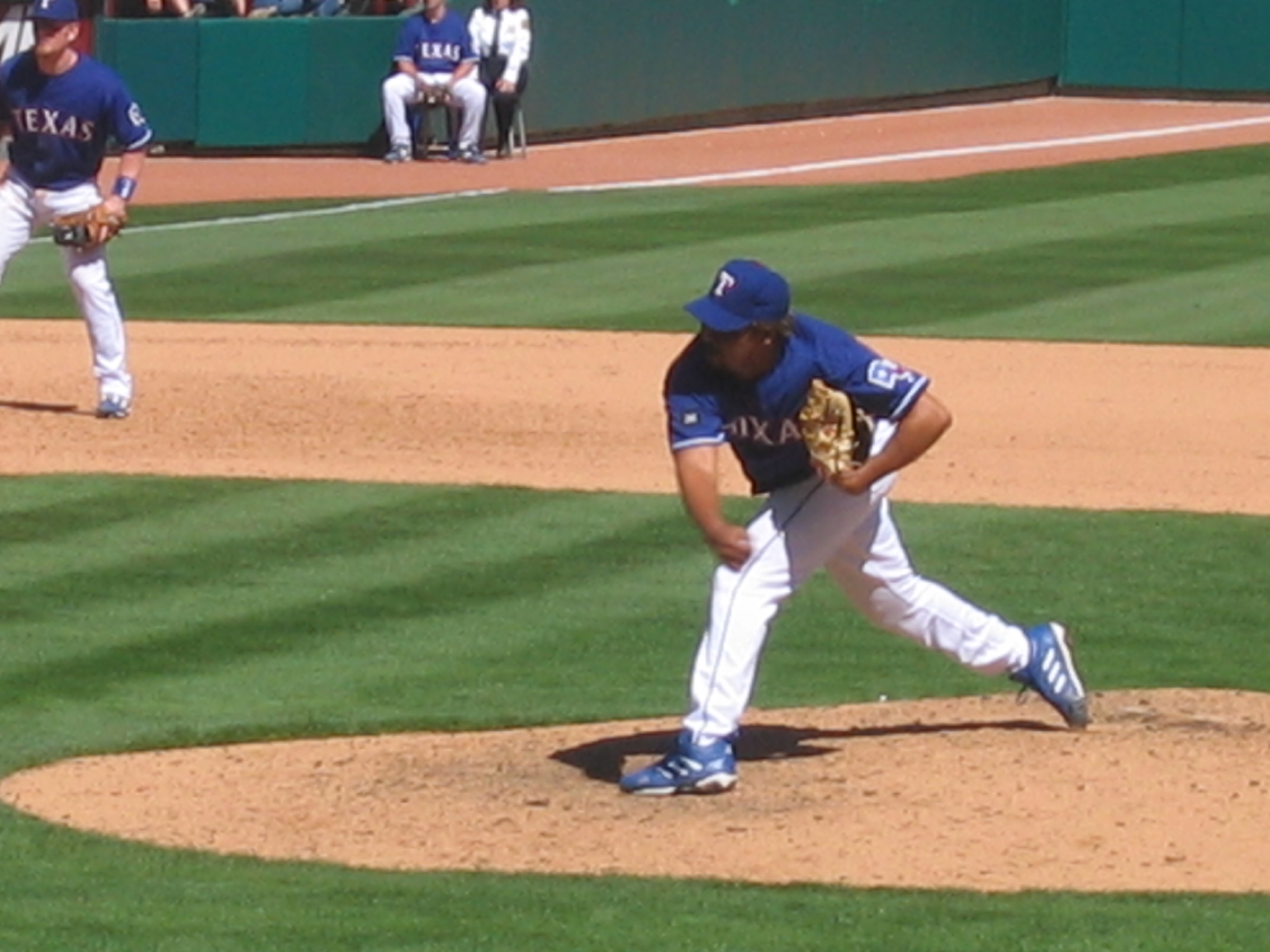
Cordero pitching for the Rangers in 2005

Cordero made his debut with the Texas Rangers on April 4, 2000, as he pitched 1 1/3 innings, allowing two runs, however, earned the victory as Texas defeated the Chicago White Sox 12–8 at The Ballpark in Arlington. He finished the season going 1–2 with a 5.35 ERA, pitching 77 1/3 innings with the Rangers.

Injuries slowed Cordero down in the 2001 season, as he appeared in only three games with Texas, going 0–0 with a 3.86 ERA. With the Oklahoma RedHawks of the Pacific Coast League, Cordero appeared in 12 games, going 0–0 with a 0.59 ERA and earning six saves in 15 1/3 innings pitched, striking out 20 hitters.

Cordero spent part of the 2002 season with Oklahoma, playing in 11 games, going 0–2 with a 5.84 ERA, while earning two saves. In Texas, Cordero earned his first career MLB save on June 19, 2002, striking out all three batters he faced in the tenth inning in a 7–4 win over the Chicago Cubs at Wrigley Field. He had a solid season with the Rangers, going 2–0 with a 1.79 ERA, while earning 10 saves. Cordero began the 2003 season as the set-up man for closer Ugueth Urbina, however, the Rangers traded Urbina to the Florida Marlins in July, and Cordero became the Rangers' closer. Cordero earned 12 saves during the last two months of the season. Overall, Cordero was 5–8 with a 2.94 ERA and 15 saves in 73 games pitched.

In 2004, Cordero was the Rangers closer for the entire season for the first time in his career, and he had an all-star season, going 3–4 with a 2.13 ERA and earning 49 saves, second only to Mariano Rivera of the New York Yankees in the American League, who had 53 saves. Cordero was named to the 2004 MLB All-Star Game at Minute Maid Park in Houston, Texas, but did not appear in the game. Cordero had another solid season in 2005, going 3–1 with a 3.39 ERA and 37 saves for the Rangers in 69 games pitched.

He began the 2006 season as the Rangers closer, however, Cordero struggled early in the season, as at the end of April, despite a 3–2 record, Cordero had an ERA of 11.45. He lost his job as the closer to Akinori Otsuka, and on July 28, 2006, Texas traded Cordero, Kevin Mench, Laynce Nix and Julian Cordero to the Milwaukee Brewers for Nelson Cruz and Carlos Lee. Cordero had a 7–4 record with a 4.81 ERA and six saves at the time of the trade.

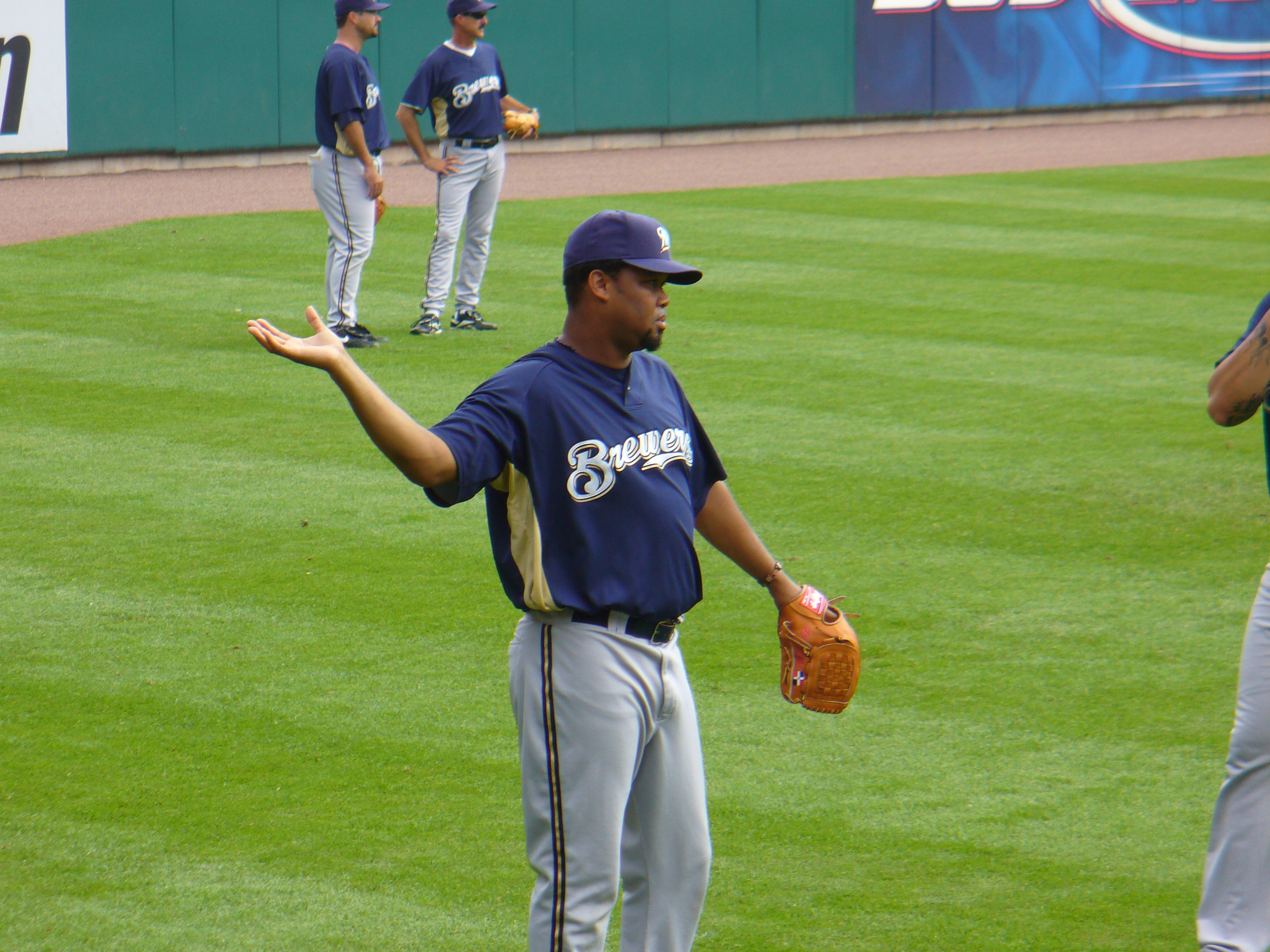
Cordero with the Brewers in 2007

=== Milwaukee Brewers ===
Cordero made his Brewers debut on July 28, 2006, pitching the ninth inning in a 4–3 loss to the Cincinnati Reds at Miller Park. Cordero took over the Brewers closers job from Derrick Turnbow, and earned his first save as a Brewer on July 30, 2006, in a 4–3 victory over Cincinnati. Cordero finished the season off strongly, going 3–1 with a 1.69 ERA in 28 games, earning 16 saves.

Cordero was named the winner of "DHL Presents the Major League Baseball Delivery Man of the Month Award" for April 2007. He was successful on his first 22 save attempts until June 9, 2007, Cordero blew his first save of the season against the Texas Rangers. Cordero played in the 2007 MLB All-Star Game at AT&T Park in San Francisco, where he allowed a home run to Carl Crawford of the Tampa Bay Devil Rays in his only inning of work. Cordero finished the season with a 0–4 record with a 2.98 ERA in 66 games, earning 44 saves, second in the National League to José Valverde of the Arizona Diamondbacks, who recorded 47 saves.

At the end of the season, Cordero became a free agent, and on November 28, 2007, Cordero signed a four-year, $46 million contract with the Cincinnati Reds, the largest contract ever given to a relief pitcher at the time.

=== Cincinnati Reds ===
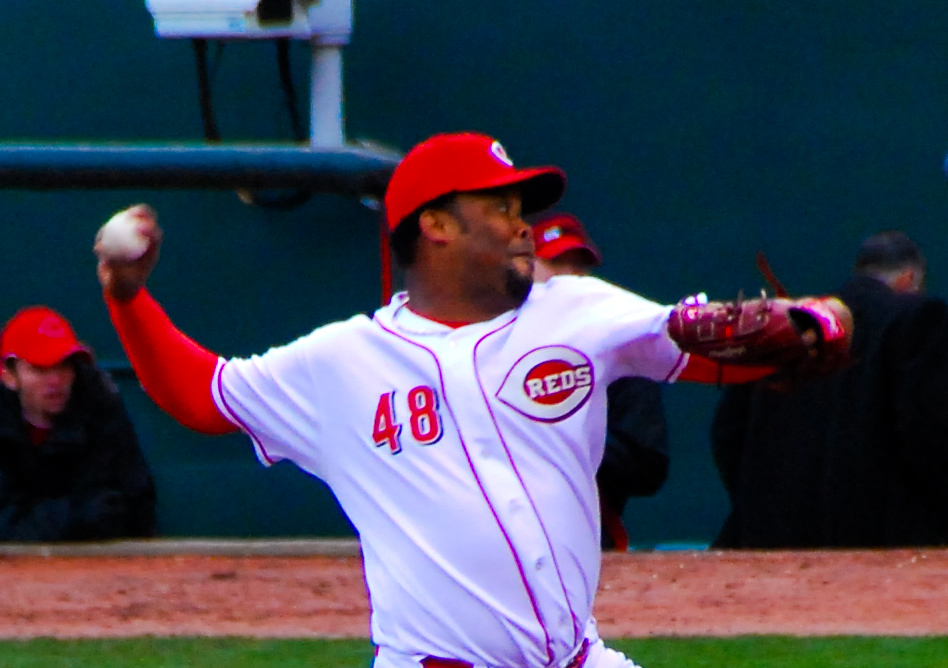
Cordero pitching for the Reds in 2009

Cordero made his Reds debut on March 31, 2008, pitching an inning in a 4–2 loss to the Arizona Diamondbacks at Great American Ballpark. Cordero earned his first save as a Red on April 3, 2008, pitching a scoreless ninth inning in a 3–2 win over Arizona. On April 5, 2008, Cordero earned his first victory with Cincinnati, getting the decision in a 4–3 win over the Philadelphia Phillies. He finished the 2008 season with a 5–4 record and a 3.33 ERA in 72 games pitched, earning 34 saves.

Cordero had another very solid season in 2009, going 2–6 with a 2.16 ERA in 69 games pitched with the Reds, registering 39 saves, and earned a spot at the 2009 MLB All-Star Game held at Busch Stadium in St. Louis, Missouri, where Cordero pitched a scoreless inning.

In 2010, Cordero played a key role as the Reds made the playoffs for the first time in 15 years, and it was the first time Cordero made the playoffs in his career. He had a 6–5 record with a 3.84 ERA in 75 games pitched, earning 40 saves. Cordero did not see any playing time in the post-season, as Cincinnati was swept by the Philadelphia Phillies in three games in the first round.

Cordero put together another very solid season in 2011, going 5–3 with a 2.45 ERA in 68 games with Cincinnati, while earning 37 saves. On June 1, 2011, Cordero earned the 300th save of his career in a 4–3 win over his former team, the Milwaukee Brewers. He became a free agent following the season.

=== Toronto Blue Jays ===
On February 1, 2012, Cordero signed a one-year, $4.5 million contract with the Toronto Blue Jays. Cordero was expected to begin the 2012 season as the Blue Jays set-up man to the newly acquired reliever Sergio Santos. Cordero was named the closer after a shoulder injury forced Santos onto the disabled list. In May, Cordero was moved back to the set up man (replaced by Casey Janssen) after poor performance in the closer role.

=== Houston Astros ===
On July 20, 2012, Cordero was traded to the Houston Astros, along with Ben Francisco, Asher Wojciechowski, David Rollins, Joe Musgrove, Carlos Pérez, and a player to be named later (Kevin Comer) for J. A. Happ, Brandon Lyon, and David Carpenter. Cordero was released by the Astros on September 10, after posting a 19.80 ERA and blowing his 3 save opportunities.

=== Boston Red Sox ===
On February 14, 2014, After not pitching during the 2013 season, Cordero signed a minor league contract with the Boston Red Sox. He was released on March 29.

== Coaching career ==
Cordero served as the pitching coach for the American League team in the 2024 All-Star Futures Game.
