= 2006 American League Division Series =

Teams
Team (Wins)		Manager	Season
Detroit Tigers (3)		Jim Leyland	95–67 (.586), GB: 1
New York Yankees (1)		Joe Torre	97–65 (.599), GA: 10
- Dates: October 3–7
- Television: Fox (Games 1, 4); ESPN (Games 2–3)
- TV announcers: Joe Buck and Tim McCarver (Game 1); Jon Miller, Joe Morgan, and Bonnie Bernstein (Game 2); Jon Miller, Joe Morgan, Ernie Harwell, and Bonnie Bernstein (Game 3); Josh Lewin, Steve Lyons, and Ken Rosenthal (Game 4)
- Radio: ESPN
- Radio announcers: Jon Sciambi and Buck Martinez
- Umpires: Tim McClelland, Laz Díaz, Alfonso Márquez, Paul Emmel, Larry Poncino, Larry Vanover

Teams
Team (Wins)		Manager	Season
Oakland Athletics (3)		Ken Macha	93–69 (.574), GA: 4
Minnesota Twins (0)		Ron Gardenhire	96–66 (.593), GA: 1
- Dates: October 3–6
- Television: ESPN
- TV announcers: Jon Miller, Joe Morgan, and Erin Andrews (Game 1); Dave O'Brien, Rick Sutcliffe, Eric Karros, and Duke Castiglione (Games 2–3)
- Radio: ESPN
- Radio announcers: Gary Thorne and Steve Stone
- Umpires: Randy Marsh, Kerwin Danley, Mike Everitt, Ed Rapuano, Tim Tschida, Tony Randazzo

The 2006 American League Division Series (ALDS) consisted of two best-of-five playoff series on the American League side in Major League Baseball’s (MLB) 2006 postseason, began on Tuesday, October 3, and ended on Saturday, October 7, with the champions of the three AL divisions—along with a "wild card" team—participating in two series.

Under MLB's playoff format, no two teams from the same division were matched up in the Division Series, regardless of whether their records would normally indicate such a matchup. Home field advantage went to the team with the better regular-season record with the exception of the wild card team, which defers home field advantage regardless of record. The matchups were:

- (1) New York Yankees (AL East champions) vs. (4) Detroit Tigers (Wild Card qualifier): Tigers won the series, 3–1.
- (2) Minnesota Twins (AL Central champions) vs. (3) Oakland Athletics (AL West champions): Athletics won the series, 3–0.

The higher seeded team in each series hosts Games 1, 2, and 5 (if necessary), and the lower seeded team hosts Games 3 and 4 (if necessary).

The Athletics and Tigers met in the AL Championship Series, Detroit swept Oakland to become American League champions. The Tigers then faced the National League champion St. Louis Cardinals in the 2006 World Series, and lost in five games.

== Playoff race ==
The AL playoff race of 2006 was unusually dramatic, with the last divisional championship and the wild card berth undecided until the final day of the season, and the most unlikely of all of the AL's playoff contenders taking the top spot in the AL Central and the second seed.

In the AL East, the New York Yankees (97–65) clinched the division when the Boston Red Sox were eliminated from the playoffs by the Minnesota Twins (96–66) on September 20. The Oakland Athletics (92–69) clinched the AL West on September 26, and in the AL Central, the Twins won the division by a single game over the Wild Card Detroit Tigers (95–67) after Detroit—who had led the division for the entire season—lost their last five games. Minnesota had set a torrid pace since June 7, after a horrible start. The Twins sewed up their playoff berth with an 8–1 win over the Kansas City Royals. They clinched the Central Division title, their fourth in five years, with a 5–1 victory and a 10–8 Detroit loss to the Royals on the last day of the season. The Twins' 96–66 mark was their best since their 98–64 record in 1970, a year in which they had won the AL West.

== Matchups ==
=== New York Yankees vs. Detroit Tigers ===
Detroit won the series, 3–1.

Game	Date	Score	Location	Time	Attendance
1	October 3	Detroit Tigers – 4, New York Yankees – 8	Yankee Stadium (I)	3:14	56,291
2	October 5†	Detroit Tigers – 4, New York Yankees – 3	Yankee Stadium (I)	3:15	56,252
3	October 6	New York Yankees – 0, Detroit Tigers – 6	Comerica Park	3:05	43,440
4	October 7	New York Yankees – 3, Detroit Tigers – 8	Comerica Park	2:54	43,126

†: Game was postponed due to rain on October 4

=== Minnesota Twins vs. Oakland Athletics ===
Oakland won the series, 3–0.

Game	Date	Score	Location	Time	Attendance
1	October 3	Oakland Athletics – 3, Minnesota Twins – 2	Hubert H. Humphrey Metrodome	2:19	55,542
2	October 4	Oakland Athletics – 5, Minnesota Twins – 2	Hubert H. Humphrey Metrodome	3:02	55,710
3	October 6	Minnesota Twins – 3, Oakland Athletics – 8	McAfee Coliseum	2:55	35,694

== New York vs. Detroit ==
=== Game 1 ===
October 3, 2006 8:20 pm (EDT) at Yankee Stadium (I) in Bronx, New York 70 °F (21 °C), cloudy
Team	1	2	3	4	5	6	7	8	9	R	H	E
Detroit	0	0	0	0	3	0	1	0	0	4	12	1
New York	0	0	5	0	0	2	0	1	X	8	14	0
WP: Chien-Ming Wang (1–0) LP: Nate Robertson (0–1); Home runs: DET: Craig Monroe (1), Curtis Granderson (1); NYY: Jason Giambi (1), Derek Jeter (1); Attendance: 56,291; Boxscore

The Yankees struck first with a five-run third inning off Nate Robertson, who allowed a leadoff single to Johnny Damon and subsequent double to Derek Jeter. Bobby Abreu doubled to score both men, Gary Sheffield singled in Abreu, and Jason Giambi capped the scoring with a two-run home run. In the fifth, the Tigers got on the board with a solo home run from Craig Monroe, then Brandon Inge singled with one out before back-to-back two-out RBI doubles by Plácido Polanco and Sean Casey made it 5–3 Yankees, but Chien-Ming Wang struck out Magglio Ordóñez to end the inning. The Yankees added to their lead in the sixth off Robertson when Damon singled with two outs, then Jeter doubled before both men scored on Abreu's single. Curtis Granderson's home run in the seventh off Mike Myers made it 7−4 Yankees, but they got that run back on Jeter's home run in the eighth off Jamie Walker. Mariano Rivera pitched a scoreless ninth while Jeter batted 5-for-5 in the game, becoming the sixth player to record five hits in one postseason game.

=== Game 2 ===
October 5, 2006 1:10 pm (EDT) at Yankee Stadium (I) in Bronx, New York 71 °F (22 °C), partly cloudy
Team	1	2	3	4	5	6	7	8	9	R	H	E
Detroit	0	1	0	0	1	1	1	0	0	4	8	0
New York	0	0	0	3	0	0	0	0	0	3	8	1
WP: Jamie Walker (1–0) LP: Mike Mussina (0–1) Sv: Todd Jones (1); Home runs: DET: Carlos Guillén (1); NYY: Johnny Damon (1); Attendance: 56,252; Boxscore

Game 2 was postponed for one day due to rain. In the second inning, Craig Monroe doubled with two outs before scoring on Marcus Thames's single to give the Tigers a 1–0 lead. In the fourth, Johnny Damon launched a three-run home run off Justin Verlander to give the Yankees a 3–1 lead. That would be last time the Yankees would lead a game in the series, and the last time they would score until Game 4. Jamie Walker (who earned the victory in relief) and Joel Zumaya shut the Yanks down for the rest of the game. The Tiger hitters clawed their way back off Mike Mussina. In the fifth, Thames hit a leadoff double, moved to third on a wild pitch, and scored on a sacrifice fly from Curtis Granderson to cut the lead to one. Next inning, Carlos Guillén homered to tie the game and in the seventh, Thames hit a leadoff single, moved to second on a passed ball, then to third on a sacrifice bunt before scoring on Granderson's triple to give the Tigers a 4–3 lead. In the ninth, Todd Jones earned the save by getting Johnny Damon to fly out to center with one man on to end the game and even the series.

=== Game 3 ===
October 6, 2006 8:09 pm (EDT) at Comerica Park in Detroit, Michigan 54 °F (12 °C), clear
Team	1	2	3	4	5	6	7	8	9	R	H	E
New York	0	0	0	0	0	0	0	0	0	0	5	0
Detroit	0	3	0	0	0	2	1	0	X	6	10	0
WP: Kenny Rogers (1–0) LP: Randy Johnson (0–1); Home runs: NYY: None; DET: Curtis Granderson (2); Attendance: 43,440; Boxscore

Feeding off a crowd witnessing its first playoff game in 19 years, Detroit pitcher Kenny Rogers pitched 7 2/3 innings of scoreless ball, earning a victory and standing ovation from the Comerica Park crowd in a 6–0 Tigers win. Rogers was throwing as hard as 92 mph in the eighth inning, topping his usual top speed by 3–4 mph. Joel Zumaya used his 103-mph arm to close out the inning, and Todd Jones closed the game for the second time, but did not earn a save, as the Tigers were not in a save situation.

Offensively, the Tigers got on the board off Randy Johnson in the second on three straight leadoff singles, the last of which by Sean Casey scoring Carlos Guillén. After Brandon Inge struck out, Curtis Granderson hit into a forceout at second to score Iván Rodríguez. It could have been a hit had Robinson Canó not made a great diving stop behind the bag to prevent the ball from going into the outfield. On a 1–2 pitch to Plácido Polanco, Granderson appeared to be picked off base when Johnson threw to first baseman Jason Giambi, but the Yankees muffed the play when Johnson and Giambi both made poor throws to each base. Polanco capitalized on their mistake when he singled up the middle, scoring Granderson to make it 3−0. In the sixth, Guillen singled with two outs before back-to-back RBI doubles by Rodriguez and Casey made it 5−0 Tigers. Granderson capped the scoring with a leadoff home run off Brian Bruney in the seventh.

=== Game 4 ===
October 7, 2006 4:30 pm (EDT) at Comerica Park in Detroit, Michigan 63 °F (17 °C), sunny
Team	1	2	3	4	5	6	7	8	9	R	H	E
New York	0	0	0	0	0	0	1	0	2	3	6	2
Detroit	0	3	1	0	3	1	0	0	X	8	13	0
WP: Jeremy Bonderman (1–0) LP: Jaret Wright (0–1); Home runs: NYY: Jorge Posada (1); DET: Magglio Ordóñez (1), Craig Monroe (2); Attendance: 43,126; Boxscore

Detroit finished off New York behind another dominating pitching performance, this time by Jeremy Bonderman in an 8–3 clinching win. In the second inning, Magglio Ordóñez hit a leadoff home run and after Iván Rodríguez walked with one out, Craig Monroe homered off Jaret Wright to give the Tigers a 3–0 lead. Next inning, Ordonez reached on an error, moved to third on a single and scored on Rodrigeuz's single. Wright was replaced by Cory Lidle, who ended the inning without further damage and pitched a perfect fourth, but in the fifth, allowed three consecutive leadoff singles, the last of which to Ordóñez scoring a run. After allowing an RBI double to Carlos Guillén, Lidle was relieved by Brian Bruney, who allowed a sacrifice fly to Rodriguez. Next inning, Scott Proctor allowed a two-out single to Plácido Polanco, who scored on Sean Casey's double to make it 8−0 Tigers. Bonderman, meanwhile, retired the first 15 Yankees in a row, needing just 38 pitches to do so against a team known for their discipline. Robinson Canó singled in the sixth for the Yankees' first hit, but Bonderman prevented any further damage. The Yankee hitters ended their 20-inning scoreless streak in the seventh when Derek Jeter hit a leadoff single, moved to third on Bobby Abreu's single and scored when Hideki Matsui just beat out a relay throw to first, preventing an inning-ending double play. Bonderman left the game in the ninth inning with one on and one out. Jamie Walker gave up a two-out, two-run homer to Jorge Posada in the ninth before getting Robinson Canó to ground out to end the game and send the Tigers to the ALCS.

For Detroit, this marked their first postseason series victory since winning the 1984 World Series. Conversely, dating back to their 2004 ALCS loss, New York lost a third consecutive postseason series for the first time in franchise history.

The game is notable as Cory Lidle's final appearance before dying in an airplane crash four days later, and was the final ALDS game televised by Fox due to the new TV contracts as of 2011. While Fox Sports would reclaim partial Division Series broadcasting rights in 2014 by broadcasting on FS1, Fox would not broadcast another Division Series game until 2022.

=== Composite box ===
2006 ALDS (3–1): Detroit Tigers over New York Yankees

Team	1	2	3	4	5	6	7	8	9	R	H	E
Detroit Tigers	0	7	1	0	7	4	3	0	0	22	43	1
New York Yankees	0	0	5	3	0	2	1	1	2	14	33	3
Total attendance: 199,109 Average attendance: 49,777

== Minnesota vs. Oakland ==
=== Game 1 ===
October 3, 2006 12:10 pm (CDT) at Hubert H. Humphrey Metrodome in Minneapolis, Minnesota 69 °F (21 °C), dome
Team	1	2	3	4	5	6	7	8	9	R	H	E
Oakland	0	2	0	0	0	0	0	0	1	3	7	0
Minnesota	0	0	0	0	0	0	1	0	1	2	5	2
WP: Barry Zito (1–0) LP: Johan Santana (0–1) Sv: Huston Street (1); Home runs: OAK: Frank Thomas 2 (2); MIN: Rondell White (1); Attendance: 55,542; Boxscore

The A's struck first in Game 1 on Frank Thomas's leadoff home run in the second off Twins' ace Johan Santana. Jay Payton singled with one out and scored on Marco Scutaro's two-out double. Barry Zito pitched 6 2/3 shutout innings before Rondell White's seventh inning home run put the Twins on the board. Thomas's second home run in the ninth off Jesse Crain made it 3–1 A's. The Twins again made it a one-run game in the bottom of the inning when Michael Cuddyer hit a leadoff triple off Huston Street and scored on Torii Hunter's one-out groundout, but White flew out to end the game and give the A's a 1–0 series lead.

=== Game 2 ===
October 4, 2006 12:10 pm (CDT) at Hubert H. Humphrey Metrodome in Minneapolis, Minnesota 69 °F (21 °C), dome
Team	1	2	3	4	5	6	7	8	9	R	H	E
Oakland	0	0	0	0	2	0	2	0	1	5	11	0
Minnesota	0	0	0	0	0	2	0	0	0	2	9	0
WP: Kiko Calero (1–0) LP: Pat Neshek (0–1) Sv: Huston Street (2); Home runs: OAK: Mark Kotsay (1); MIN: Michael Cuddyer (1), Justin Morneau (1); Attendance: 55,710; Boxscore

In Game 2, Nick Swisher doubled to lead off the fifth off Boof Bonser, then scored on Marco Scutaro's double. One out later, Jason Kendall's RBI single made it 2–0 Oakland. Back-to-back home runs by Michael Cuddyer and Justin Morneau leading off the bottom of the sixth off Esteban Loaiza tied the game. In the seventh, Mark Ellis singled with one out off Pat Neshek, then Mark Kotsay's inside-the-park home run off Dennys Reyes put Oakland back in front 4–2. They added another run in the ninth when Swisher hit a leadoff double off Juan Rincón, moved to third on a groundout and scored on a wild pitch by Joe Nathan. Huston Street pitched a scoreless bottom of the ninth despite allowing a single and walk to give the A's a 2–0 series lead.

=== Game 3 ===
October 6, 2006 1:10 pm (PDT) at McAfee Coliseum in Oakland, California 56 °F (13 °C), overcast
Team	1	2	3	4	5	6	7	8	9	R	H	E
Minnesota	0	0	0	1	0	1	0	1	0	3	12	3
Oakland	0	2	2	0	0	0	4	0	X	8	8	1
WP: Dan Haren (1–0) LP: Brad Radke (0–1); Home runs: MIN: Torii Hunter (1), Justin Morneau (2); OAK: Eric Chavez (1), Milton Bradley (1); Attendance: 35,694; Boxscore

The A's struck first in the bottom of the second on Eric Chavez's one-out home run off Brad Radke, who would retire following the series. Jay Payton then singled before scoring on Marco Scutaro's two-out double. Next inning, Mark Kotsay reached on an error before Milton Bradley's two-run home run made it 4–0 A's. Torii Hunter's home run in the fourth off Dan Haren put the Twins on the board. In the sixth, with Justin Morneau at third and Hunter at second, Rondell White's RBI single made it 4–2 A's, but Hunter was thrown out at home for the second out. In the seventh, Dennys Reyes walked two without outs before being relieved by Jesse Crain. An error loaded the bases before Nick Swisher walked to force in a run and Scutaro cleared the bases with a double, all four runs unearned. Morneau's home run in the eighth off Justin Duchscherer made it 8–3 A's, but Huston Street pitched a scoreless ninth as the A's won their first postseason series since the 1990 ALCS.

=== Composite box ===
2006 ALDS (3–0): Oakland Athletics over Minnesota Twins

Team	1	2	3	4	5	6	7	8	9	R	H	E
Oakland Athletics	0	4	2	0	2	0	6	0	2	16	26	1
Minnesota Twins	0	0	0	1	0	3	1	1	1	7	26	5
Total attendance: 146,946 Average attendance: 48,982
