= 2006 Detroit Tigers season =

Major League Baseball season

2006 Detroit Tigers
- American League champions American League Wild Card winners
- League: American League
- Division: Central
- Ballpark: Comerica Park
- City: Detroit, Michigan
- Record: 95–67 (.586)
- Divisional place: 2nd
- Owners: Mike Ilitch
- General managers: Dave Dombrowski
- Managers: Jim Leyland
- Television: FSN Detroit; WDWB (Mario Impemba, Rod Allen)
- Radio: The Detroit Tigers Radio Network (Jim Price, Dan Dickerson)

The 2006 Detroit Tigers won the American League Championship Series (ALCS) and therefore represented the American League in the World Series. They lost the series, falling to the St. Louis Cardinals 4 games to 1. The season was their 106th since entering the American League in 1901, and it was their seventh season since opening Comerica Park in 2000. The 2006 team was also the first team since 1993 to finish with a winning record and the first team since 1987 to reach the playoffs.

== Regular season ==
The Tigers were baseball's surprise success story of 2006. After years of poor performances, including 12 consecutive losing seasons and an AL-record 119 losses in 2003, the 2006 season had the Tigers surging to the top of the major league standings in May, and holding through October 1 when their losses earned them the wild card spot in the ALCS instead. The play of veterans like Kenny Rogers and Todd Jones, the emergence of previously unestablished players Curtis Granderson, Brandon Inge, Craig Monroe and Marcus Thames, and significant production from All-Stars Iván Rodríguez, Magglio Ordóñez and Carlos Guillén, all contributed to the team's success.

A great deal of credit was also given to manager Jim Leyland. On April 17, after an uninspiring 10–2 loss at home to the Cleveland Indians dropped the team's record to 7–6, the manager launched into a tirade about the team's lack of effort, telling the media, "We stunk. They [the players] were already on the plane to Oakland." It appeared to light a fire under the players, spurring them on to a stretch in which they won 28 of 35 games. Leyland consistently emphasized the importance of playing with intensity throughout all nine innings, a philosophy embraced not only in the words of the players but also demonstrated by the team's now regular late-inning clutch hits, rallies, and comebacks.

Statistically, the biggest factor in the team's success was its pitching, leading the major leagues in earned run average (ERA) and shutouts. Rookie Justin Verlander won the AL Rookie of the Year Award, and fellow starters Kenny Rogers, Jeremy Bonderman and Nate Robertson, as well as rookie reliever Joel Zumaya, all had noteworthy seasons. There was concern when starter Mike Maroth—who had lost 20 games in 2003, but had since rebounded—had to undergo surgery early in the season, but his replacement Zach Miner proved to be adequate.

The Tigers' newfound success attracted a new generation of fans, many of whom had never seen winning baseball in Detroit. Detroit hit 16 home runs in their first four games, the most ever by any team in their first four games of the season. Tigers fans traveled to road games in large numbers, most notably at the interleague series with the Chicago Cubs at Wrigley Field from June 16–18. The crowd could be heard chanting "Let's Go Tigers!" throughout all three games, all of which were Detroit victories.

The major doubt many fans and pundits continued to have was whether the Tigers could compete against other top-tier American League teams. Early in the season, the team lost a series to both the New York Yankees and Boston Red Sox, and lost five of six games to the 2005 World Series champion (and AL Central rival) Chicago White Sox. However, on July 20, at a game which featured a notable rendition of the national anthem by local opera singer Eugene Zweig, and a standing-room-only crowd that included actor Tom Hanks and director Ron Howard, the Tigers beat White Sox pitching ace José Contreras to take the series two games to one, the team's first series victory against a favored AL team in 2006. In their next two series, against the AL West division-leading Oakland Athletics, and the Minnesota Twins, who were 34–8 over their previous 42 games, the Tigers also won two out of three games.

On July 31, Tigers management traded minor-league pitcher Brian Rogers to the Pittsburgh Pirates in exchange for left-handed hitting and three-time All Star first baseman Sean Casey. The move added a left-handed batter to the lineup, especially necessary after Dmitri Young was released in September.

By August 7, the Tigers were an astonishing 40 games above .500 (76–36). Unfortunately, they lost their next five games, sixteen of their next 22, and as a result of a poorly performing offense, the last six weeks of the season resulted in a 19–31 record for the last 50 games of the season. The team suffered a major loss when one of their best all-around players, Plácido Polanco, separated his shoulder making a spectacular over-the-shoulder catch in Fenway Park against the Red Sox on August 15.

The Tigers clinched a playoff berth on September 24 with an 11–4 win over the Kansas City Royals. On October 1, despite a rare relief appearance from Kenny Rogers, the Tigers fell out of the top spot in the American League Central with a 10–8 extra-inning loss to the 100-loss Royals in their last regular season game.

Detroit lost their last five regular season games, all at home, against the Toronto Blue Jays and the Royals. The final loss gave the Twins the AL Central title, and made the Tigers the American League wild card entrant in the postseason. Their opening-round opponent would be the New York Yankees.

The Tigers ended the regular season with a 95–67 record, marking the team's first winning season since 1993 and their most wins since 1987. They were the only team outside the American League East to win the AL Wild Card between 2003 and 2011.

=== Highlights ===
There were many memorable moments during the regular season. Some of the highlights:

- On April 16, Chris Shelton became the fastest player to eight home runs in American League history, and the Tigers won a 1–0 game behind a sparkling three-hitter by Mike Maroth and one-hit relief by Joel Zumaya and Fernando Rodney.
- On April 20, the Tigers came into the ninth down 3–1, but clutch hits tied the game, and Brandon Inge's resolute 15-pitch walk (Jim Leyland called it a "1½ Marlboro" at-bat, in reference to his noted chain-smoking when in the dugout) forced in the winning run.
- On May 3, in the eighth inning of a tense pitching duel, Brandon Inge beat a throw to second to avoid a double play, then Alexis Gómez singled him in for a 2–1 comeback victory.
- On May 14, the Tigers swept the Indians in a three-game series with a 3–2 victory, the first time Detroit swept a series from the Indians in Cleveland since 1990.
- On May 20, Cincinnati's Ken Griffey Jr. hit a grand slam that put the Reds up, 6–5, but with two outs in the ninth inning, Curtis Granderson hit a home run that tied the game, and the Tigers won in extra innings.
- On June 1, hits by Ivan Rodríguez and Magglio Ordóñez (and gum-chewing by Nate Robertson) set up Carlos Guillén's game-winning ("walk-off") single, completing a five-run comeback and defeating the Yankees.
- On June 18, Kenny Rogers won his 200th game, becoming only the 26th left-hander in baseball history to do so; Detroit hit eight home runs to set a club record.
- On June 27, Roger Clemens hurled a three-hitter, but Nate Robertson outpitched him and the Tigers won, 4–0.
- On July 11, the 2006 All-Star Game featured three Tigers—Rodríguez, Kenny Rogers and Ordóñez—for the first time since 1987. Rodríguez was voted as a starter, while Rogers was named the starting pitcher. The battery combination of Rogers and Rodríguez was the first time a Tigers pitcher threw to a Tigers catcher to start the Mid-Summer Classic since Denny McLain threw to Bill Freehan in 1966.
- On July 14, in a tie game, with two out and two on in the top of the ninth, reliever Todd Jones faced dangerous slugger Mark Teahen, who had already hit two home runs in the game. Jones threw Teahen every pitch he could, and Teahen repeatedly fouled each pitch off. Finally Jim Leyland walked to the mound—where he told Jones his visit was a ruse, designed to fool Teahen into thinking Jones would be throwing anything but a fastball. Leyland walked off the field, Jones threw a fastball, and Teahen swung and missed for strike three. Then, in the bottom of the ninth, Carlos Guillén hit the Tigers' first walk-off home run of the season for the victory. After the game, Jones said of Leyland's visit to the mound: "I thought, 'Wow, you're really a good manager.'"
- On July 19, Craig Monroe hit a grand slam in a Tigers victory over the Chicago White Sox.
- On July 20 (see above), the Tigers essentially beat the White Sox on a Marcus Thames slide into second. The slide broke up a seemingly sure double play, which allowed the winning run to score later that inning.
- On July 24, the Tigers became the first team since the 1891 St. Louis Cardinals to score 5 runs or more in the first inning in three consecutive games.
- On July 28, the Tigers weathered 12 strikeouts by rookie Twins phenom Francisco Liriano, and won another tight game with a 10th-inning single by Craig Monroe.
- On August 1, Carlos Guillén hit for the cycle, becoming the first Tiger since Damion Easley did it in 2001, and the third since 1950, to do so.
- On August 5, Iván Rodríguez hit a walk-off home run with two outs in the ninth inning to complete a comeback against the Cleveland Indians.
- On August 27, a 7–1 victory over the Cleveland Indians secured the Tigers an 82nd victory—and their first winning season since 1993.
- On August 30, with two outs in the top of the ninth, Craig Monroe hit a dramatic three-run home run, erasing a one-run deficit, stunning the crowd at Yankee Stadium, and giving the Tigers a 5–3 come-from-behind victory over the Yankees.
- On September 12, Craig Monroe tied a club record with three outfield assists, including throwing two runners out at the plate, and Carlos Guillén hit two home runs, one from each side of the plate, the second being a walk-off in the bottom of the ninth that won the game, 3–2, over the Texas Rangers.
- On September 23, the Tigers scored ten runs in the first inning in a 15–4 victory over the Kansas City Royals. The game marked Plácido Polanco's return from the disabled list; he had three hits.
- On September 24, the Tigers scored nine runs in the second inning en route to an 11–4 victory. The win secured their first playoff appearance since 1987.

=== Season standings ===
AL Central
| Team | W | L | Pct. | GB | Home | Road |
|---|---|---|---|---|---|---|
| Minnesota Twins | 96 | 66 | .593 | — | 54‍–‍27 | 42‍–‍39 |
| Detroit Tigers | 95 | 67 | .586 | 1 | 46‍–‍35 | 49‍–‍32 |
| Chicago White Sox | 90 | 72 | .556 | 6 | 49‍–‍32 | 41‍–‍40 |
| Cleveland Indians | 78 | 84 | .481 | 18 | 44‍–‍37 | 34‍–‍47 |
| Kansas City Royals | 62 | 100 | .383 | 34 | 34‍–‍47 | 28‍–‍53 |

=== Record vs. opponents ===
2006 American League record Source: MLB Standings Grid – 2006
| Team | BAL | BOS | CWS | CLE | DET | KC | LAA | MIN | NYY | OAK | SEA | TB | TEX | TOR | NL |
|---|---|---|---|---|---|---|---|---|---|---|---|---|---|---|---|
| Baltimore | — | 3–15 | 2–5 | 4–2 | 3–3 | 5–1 | 4–6 | 3–6 | 7–12 | 2–4 | 4–6 | 13–6 | 3–6 | 8–11 | 9–9 |
| Boston | 15–3 | — | 4–2 | 3–4 | 3–3 | 4–5 | 3–3 | 1–5 | 8–11 | 3–7 | 4–6 | 10–9 | 5–4 | 7–12 | 16–2 |
| Chicago | 5–2 | 2–4 | — | 8–11 | 12–7 | 11–8 | 6–3 | 9–10 | 2–4 | 3–3 | 5–4 | 3–3 | 5–5 | 5–4 | 14–4 |
| Cleveland | 2–4 | 4–3 | 11–8 | — | 6–13 | 10–8 | 4–5 | 8–11 | 3–4 | 3–6 | 4–5 | 6–1 | 5–4 | 4–2 | 8–10 |
| Detroit | 3–3 | 3–3 | 7–12 | 13–6 | — | 14–4 | 3–5 | 11–8 | 2–5 | 5–4 | 6–3 | 5–3 | 5–5 | 3–3 | 15–3 |
| Kansas City | 1–5 | 5–4 | 8–11 | 8–10 | 4–14 | — | 3–7 | 7–12 | 2–7 | 4–5 | 3–5 | 1–5 | 3–3 | 3–4 | 10–8 |
| Los Angeles | 6–4 | 3–3 | 3–6 | 5–4 | 5–3 | 7–3 | — | 4–2 | 6–4 | 11–8 | 10–9 | 7–2 | 11–8 | 4–6 | 7–11 |
| Minnesota | 6–3 | 5–1 | 10–9 | 11–8 | 8–11 | 12–7 | 2–4 | — | 3–3 | 6–4 | 5–3 | 6–1 | 4–5 | 2–5 | 16–2 |
| New York | 12–7 | 11–8 | 4–2 | 4–3 | 5–2 | 7–2 | 4–6 | 3–3 | — | 3–6 | 3–3 | 13–5 | 8–2 | 10–8 | 10–8 |
| Oakland | 4–2 | 7–3 | 3–3 | 6–3 | 4–5 | 5–4 | 8–11 | 4–6 | 6–3 | — | 17–2 | 6–3 | 9–10 | 6–4 | 8–10 |
| Seattle | 6–4 | 6–4 | 4–5 | 5–4 | 3–6 | 5–3 | 9–10 | 3–5 | 3–3 | 2–17 | — | 6–3 | 8–11 | 4–5 | 14–4 |
| Tampa Bay | 6–13 | 9–10 | 3–3 | 1–6 | 3–5 | 5–1 | 2–7 | 1–6 | 5–13 | 3–6 | 3–6 | — | 3–6 | 6–12 | 11–7 |
| Texas | 6–3 | 4–5 | 5–5 | 4–5 | 5–5 | 3–3 | 8–11 | 5–4 | 2–8 | 10–9 | 11–8 | 6–3 | — | 4–2 | 7–11 |
| Toronto | 11–8 | 12–7 | 4–5 | 2–4 | 3–3 | 4–3 | 6–4 | 5–2 | 8–10 | 4–6 | 5–4 | 12–6 | 2–4 | — | 9–9 |

=== Roster ===
2006 Detroit Tigers
Roster
| Pitchers: 38 Jeremy Bonderman; 43 Román Colón; 52 Chad Durbin; 49 Jason Grilli; 59 Todd Jones; 41 Wilfredo Ledezma; 36 Colby Lewis; 46 Mike Maroth; 50 Andrew Miller; 31 Zach Miner; 29 Nate Robertson; 56 Fernando Rodney; 37 Kenny Rogers; 44 Bobby Seay; 48 Chris Spurling; 53 Jordan Tata; 35 Justin Verlander; 32 Jamie Walker; 54 Joel Zumaya | Catchers: 7 Iván Rodríguez; 13 Vance Wilson; Infielders: 21 Sean Casey; 9 Carlos Guillén; 36 Jack Hannahan; 19 Kevin Hooper; 20 Omar Infante; 15 Brandon Inge; 8 Neifi Pérez; 14 Plácido Polanco; 39 Ramón Santiago; 26 Chris Shelton; 25 Dmitri Young | Outfielders: 24 Brent Clevlen; 45 Alexis Gómez; 28 Curtis Granderson; 27 Craig Monroe; 30 Magglio Ordóñez; 33 Marcus Thames; Other batters: 58 Mike Rabelo; 25 Matt Stairs | Manager: 10 Jim Leyland; Coaches: 17 Rafael Belliard (infield); 55 Chuck Hernandez (pitching); 22 Gene Lamont (third base); 21 Lloyd McClendon (bullpen); 34 Don Slaught (hitting); 18 Andy Van Slyke (first base) |

2006 Game Log: 95–67 (Home: 46–35; Away: 49–32)
April: 16–9 (Home: 5–5; Away: 11–4)

| # | Date | Opponent | Score | Win | Loss | Save | Attendance | Record | Streak |
|---|---|---|---|---|---|---|---|---|---|
| 1 | April 3 | @ Royals | 3–1 | Rogers (1–0) | Elarton (0–1) | Rodney (1) | 41,054 | 1–0 | W1 |
| 2 | April 5 | @ Royals | 14–3 | Bonderman (1–0) | Mays (0–1) | | 11,265 | 2–0 | W2 |
| 3 | April 6 | @ Rangers | 10–6 | Robertson (1–0) | Dickey (0–1) | | 21,713 | 3–0 | W3 |
| 4 | April 7 | @ Rangers | 5–2 | Maroth (1–0) | Koronka (0–1) | Rodney (2) | 21,155 | 4–0 | W4 |
| 5 | April 8 | @ Rangers | 7–0 | Verlander (1–0) | Millwood (0–2) | | 35,066 | 5–0 | W5 |
| 6 | April 9 | @ Rangers | 5–3 | Padilla (2–0) | Rogers (1–1) | Cordero (1) | 31,032 | 5–1 | L1 |
| 7 | April 10 | White Sox | 5–3 | Garcia (1–1) | Bonderman (1–1) | Jenks (2) | 44,179 | 5–2 | L2 |
| 8 | April 12 | White Sox | 4–3 | Contreras (1–0) | Robertson (1–1) | Jenks (3) | 12,601 | 5–3 | L3 |
| 9 | April 13 | White Sox | 13–9 | Garland (1–1) | Verlander (1–1) | | 14,027 | 5–4 | L4 |
| 10 | April 14 | Indians | 5–1 | Rogers (2–1) | Westbrook (2–1) | | 27,358 | 6–4 | W1 |
| 11 | April 15 | Indians | 7–2 | Carmona (1–0) | Bonderman (1–2) | | 30,107 | 6–5 | L1 |
| 12 | April 16 | Indians | 1–0 | Maroth (2–0) | Lee (1–1) | Rodney (3) | 14,303 | 7–5 | W1 |
| 13 | April 17 | Indians | 10–2 | Byrd (2–1) | Robertson (1–2) | | 19,126 | 7–6 | L1 |
| 14 | April 18 | @ Athletics | 4–3 | Duchscherer (1–0) | Verlander (1–2) | Street (4) | 16,857 | 7–7 | L2 |
| 15 | April 19 | @ Athletics | 11–4 | Rogers (3–1) | Blanton (1–2) | | 18,309 | 8–7 | W1 |
| 16 | April 20 | @ Athletics | 4–3 | Rodney (1–0) | Duchscherer (1–1) | | 15,489 | 9–7 | W2 |
| 17 | April 21 | @ Mariners | 2–1 | Maroth (3–0) | Washburn (1–3) | Jones (1) | 35,237 | 10–7 | W3 |
| 18 | April 22 | @ Mariners | 2–0 | Robertson (2–2) | Meche (1–1) | Rodney (4) | 27,893 | 11–7 | W4 |
| 19 | April 23 | @ Mariners | 6–4 | Verlander (2–2) | Hernandez (0–3) | Jones (2) | 28,659 | 12–7 | W5 |
| 20 | April 24 | @ Angels | 3–0 | Santana (2–0) | Rogers (3–2) | Rodriguez (8) | 39,776 | 12–8 | L1 |
| 21 | April 25 | @ Angels | 5–2 | Bonderman (2–2) | Carrasco (0–1) | Jones (3) | 40,007 | 13–8 | W1 |
| 22 | April 26 | @ Angels | 4–0 | Lackey (3–1) | Maroth (3–1) | | 37,532 | 13–9 | L1 |
| 23 | April 28 | Twins | 9–0 | Robertson (3–2) | Radke (2–3) | | 23,263 | 14–9 | W1 |
| 24 | April 29 | Twins | 18–1 | Verlander (3–2) | Silva (1–4) | | 24,258 | 15–9 | W2 |
| 25 | April 30 | Twins | 6–0 | Rogers (4–2) | Lohse (1–2) | | 24,323 | 16–9 | W3 |

May: 19–9 (Home: 10–6; Away: 9–3)

| # | Date | Opponent | Score | Win | Loss | Save | Attendance | Record | Streak |
|---|---|---|---|---|---|---|---|---|---|
| 26 | May 1 | Kansas City | 3–2 | Bonderman (3–2) | Hernandez (1–1) | Jones (4) | 9,597 | 17–9 | W4 |
| 27 | May 2 | Kansas City | 4–1 | Maroth (4–1) | Redman (0–2) | Jones (5) | 12,415 | 18–9 | W5 |
| 28 | May 3 | LA Angels | 2–1 | Zumaya (1–0) | Weaver (1–4) | Rodney (5) | 17,171 | 19–9 | W6 |
| 29 | May 4 | LA Angels | 7–2 | Gregg (2–0) | Verlander (3–3) | | 24,879 | 19–10 | L1 |
| 30 | May 5 | at Minnesota | 9–6 | Rogers (5–2) | Lohse (1–3) | Jones (6) | 23,892 | 20–10 | W1 |
| 31 | May 6 | at Minnesota | 7–6 | Rincon (2–0) | Jones (0–1) | | 20,907 | 20–11 | L1 |
| 32 | May 7 | at Minnesota | 4–2 | Santana (3–3) | Maroth (4–2) | Nathan (4) | 20,548 | 20–12 | L2 |
| 33 | May 9 | at Baltimore | 7–6 | Hawkins (1–1) | Rodney (1–1) | Ray (8) | 16,566 | 20–13 | L3 |
| 34 | May 10 | at Baltimore | 6–3 | Verlander (4–3) | Lopez (1–5) | Jones (7) | 15,548 | 21–13 | W1 |
| 35 | May 12 | at Cleveland | 5–4 | Rogers (6–2) | Lee (2–4) | Jones (8) | 23,588 | 22–13 | W2 |
| 36 | May 13 | at Cleveland | 3–0 | Bonderman (4–2) | Sabathia (2–1) | Jones (9) | 24,051 | 23–13 | W3 |
| 37 | May 14 | at Cleveland | 3–2 | Maroth (5–2) | Johnson (2–3) | Rodney (6) | 21,875 | 24–13 | W4 |
| 38 | May 16 | Minnesota | 7–4 | Robertson (4–2) | Lohse (2–4) | Jones (10) | 18,115 | 25–13 | W5 |
| 39 | May 17 | Minnesota | 2–0 | Verlander (5–3) | Santana (4–4) | Jones (11) | 16,669 | 26–13 | W6 |
| 40 | May 18 | Minnesota | 5–3 | Rogers (7–2) | Radke (4–5) | Jones (12) | 26,732 | 27–13 | W7 |
| 41 | May 19 | Cincinnati | 9–4 | Claussen (3–4) | Bonderman (4–3) | | 26,933 | 27–14 | L1 |
| 42 | May 20 | Cincinnati | 7–6 | Rodney (2–1) | Weathers (1–2) | | 43,128 | 28–14 | W1 |
| 43 | May 21 | Cincinnati | 1–0 | Rodney (3–1) | Harang (5–3) | Jones (13) | 31,515 | 29–14 | W2 |
| 44 | May 22 | at Kansas City | 8–0 | Verlander (6–3) | Affeldt (2–4) | | 9,746 | 30–14 | W3 |
| 45 | May 23 | at Kansas City | 8–5 | Zumaya (2–0) | Dessens (2–4) | Jones (14) | 15,556 | 31–14 | W4 |
| 46 | May 24 | at Kansas City | 6–3 | Bonderman (5–3) | Gobble (0–1) | Jones (15) | 10,745 | 32–14 | W5 |
| 47 | May 25 | at Kansas City | 13–8 | Zumaya (3–0) | Dessens (2–5) | | 11,488 | 33–14 | W6 |
| 48 | May 26 | Cleveland | 8–3 | Robertson (5–2) | Westbrook (4–3) | | 31,241 | 34–14 | W7 |
| 49 | May 27 | Cleveland | 3–1 | Verlander (7–3) | Byrd (4–4) | Jones (16) | 37,102 | 35–14 | W8 |
| 50 | May 28 | Cleveland | 9–0 | Johnson (3–4) | Rogers (7–3) | | 37,908 | 35–15 | L1 |
| 51 | May 29 | NY Yankees | 4–0 | Johnson (7–4) | Bonderman (5–4) | | 39,759 | 35–16 | L2 |
| 52 | May 30 | NY Yankees | 11–6 | Rivera (3–3) | Jones (0–2) | | 24,765 | 35–17 | L3 |
| 53 | May 31 | NY Yankees | 6–1 | Mussina (7–1) | Robertson (5–3) | | 23,757 | 35–18 | L4 |

June: 20–7 (Home: 11–3; Away: 9–4)

| # | Date | Opponent | Score | Win | Loss | Save | Attendance | Record | Streak |
|---|---|---|---|---|---|---|---|---|---|
| 54 | June 1 | NY Yankees | 7–6 | Rodney (4–1) | Farnsworth (1–3) | | 27,231 | 36–18 | W1 |
| 55 | June 2 | Boston | 3–2 | Seanez (1–0) | Jones (0–3) | Papelbon (20) | 35,531 | 36–19 | L1 |
| 56 | June 3 | Boston | 6–2 | Bonderman (6–4) | Wakefield (4–7) | Rodney (7) | 40,872 | 37–19 | W1 |
| 57 | June 4 | Boston | 8–3 | Clement (5–4) | Miner (0–1) | | 35,764 | 37–20 | L1 |
| 58 | June 6 | at Chicago Sox | 4–3 | McCarthy (3–3) | Rodney (4–2) | Jenks (16) | 37,192 | 37–21 | L2 |
| 59 | June 7 | at Chicago Sox | 4–3 | Contreras (6–0) | Verlander (7–4) | Jenks (17) | 37,612 | 37–22 | L3 |
| 60 | June 8 | at Chicago Sox | 6–2 | Rogers (8–3) | Garland (4–3) | | 37,354 | 38–22 | W1 |
| 61 | June 9 | at Toronto | 10–5 | Frasor (2–1) | Jones (0–4) | | 21,425 | 38–23 | L1 |
| 62 | June 10 | at Toronto | 5–3 | Miner (1–1) | Lilly (5–7) | Jones (17) | 27,021 | 39–23 | W1 |
| 63 | June 11 | at Toronto | 10–5 | Robertson (6–3) | Taubenheim (0–3) | Zumaya (1) | 30,404 | 40–23 | W2 |
| 64 | June 12 | Tampa Bay | 4–3 | Jones (1–4) | Meadows (1–1) | | 16,302 | 41–23 | W3 |
| 65 | June 13 | Tampa Bay | 7–1 | Rogers (9–3) | McClung (2–9) | | 20,935 | 42–23 | W4 |
| 66 | June 14 | Tampa Bay | 5–1 | Meadows (2–1) | Jones (1–5) | | 25,265 | 42–24 | L1 |
| 67 | June 15 | Tampa Bay | 6–2 | Miner (2–1) | Fossum (2–3) | | 28,269 | 43–24 | W1 |
| 68 | June 16 | at Chicago Cubs | 5–3 | Robertson (7–3) | Rusch (2–7) | Jones (18) | 40,683 | 44–24 | W2 |
| 69 | June 17 | at Chicago Cubs | 9–3 | Verlander (8–4) | Marmol (1–1) | | 41,459 | 45–24 | W3 |
| 70 | June 18 | at Chicago Cubs | 12–3 | Rogers (10–3) | Prior (0–1) | | 39,938 | 46–24 | W4 |
| 71 | June 19 | at Milwaukee | 3–1 | Bonderman (7–4) | Wise (4–4) | Jones (19) | 29,623 | 47–24 | W5 |
| 72 | June 20 | at Milwaukee | 10–1 | Miner (3–1) | Helling (0–1) | | 33,119 | 48–24 | W6 |
| 73 | June 21 | at Milwaukee | 4–3 | Capuano (8–4) | Zumaya (3–1) | Turnbow (21) | 31,222 | 48–25 | L1 |
| 74 | June 23 | St. Louis | 10–6 | Verlander (9–4) | Carpenter (6–4) | | 42,238 | 49–25 | W1 |
| 75 | June 24 | St. Louis | 7–6 | Zumaya (4–1) | Johnson (0–1) | | 42,535 | 50–25 | W2 |
| 76 | June 25 | St. Louis | 4–1 | Ledezma (1–0) | Ponson (4–3) | Jones (20) | 40,644 | 51–25 | W3 |
| 77 | June 26 | Houston | 10–4 | Miner (4–1) | Rodriguez (8–5) | | 24,285 | 52–25 | W4 |
| 78 | June 27 | Houston | 4–0 | Robertson (8–3) | Clemens (0–2) | | 39,852 | 53–25 | W5 |
| 79 | June 28 | Houston | 5–0 | Verlander (10–4) | Pettitte (6–9) | | 29,249 | 54–25 | W6 |
| 80 | June 30 | at Pittsburgh | 7–6 | Colon (1–0) | Wells (0–3) | Jones (21) | 27,318 | 55–25 | W7 |

July: 15–10 (Home: 7–3; Away: 8–7)

| # | Date | Opponent | Score | Win | Loss | Save | Attendance | Record | Streak |
|---|---|---|---|---|---|---|---|---|---|
| 81 | July 1 | at Pittsburgh | 9–2 | Capps (3–1) | Grilli (0–1) | | 37,111 | 55–26 | L1 |
| 82 | July 2 | at Pittsburgh | 9–8 | Miner (5–1) | Snell (7–6) | Jones (22) | 28,136 | 56–26 | W1 |
| 83 | July 3 | at Oakland | 5–3 | Blanton (8–7) | Robertson (8–4) | Street (19) | 35,077 | 56–27 | L1 |
| 84 | July 4 | at Oakland | 2–1 | Gaudin (1–2) | Rodney (4–3) | | 21,096 | 56–28 | L2 |
| 85 | July 5 | at Oakland | 10–4 | Rogers (11–3) | Saarloos (3–5) | Colon (1) | 22,210 | 57–28 | W1 |
| 86 | July 7 | at Seattle | 6–1 | Bonderman (8–4) | Pineiro (6–8) | | 31,727 | 58–28 | W2 |
| 87 | July 8 | at Seattle | 2–1 | Miner (6–1) | Washburn (4–9) | Jones (23) | 32,404 | 59–28 | W3 |
| 88 | July 9 | at Seattle | 3–2 | Meche (8–4) | Robertson (8–5) | Putz (16) | 37,364 | 59–29 | L1 |
| 89 | July 13 | Kansas City | 6–4 | Bonderman (9–4) | Duckworth (1–2) | Jones (24) | 31,967 | 60–29 | W1 |
| 90 | July 14 | Kansas City | 10–9 | Jones (2–5) | Affeldt (4–6) | | 38,442 | 61–29 | W2 |
| 91 | July 15 | Kansas City | 6–0 | Verlander (11–4) | Gobble (3–3) | | 40,210 | 62–29 | W3 |
| 92 | July 16 | Kansas City | 9–6 | Elarton (4–9) | Miner (6–2) | MacDougal (1) | 37,893 | 62–30 | L1 |
| 93 | July 18 | Chicago Sox | 7–1 | Garland (9–3) | Robertson (8–6) | | 39,153 | 62–31 | L2 |
| 94 | July 19 | Chicago Sox | 5–2 | Bonderman (10–4) | Vazquez (9–5) | | 39,593 | 63–31 | W1 |
| 95 | July 20 | Chicago Sox | 2–1 | Zumaya (5–1) | Contreras (9–2) | Jones (25) | 41,075 | 64–31 | W2 |
| 96 | July 21 | Oakland | 7–4 | Verlander (12–4) | Haren (6–9) | | 40,687 | 65–31 | W3 |
| 97 | July 22 | Oakland | 9–5 | Blanton (10–8) | Ledezma (1–1) | | 38,923 | 65–32 | L1 |
| 98 | July 23 | Oakland | 8–4 | Robertson (9–6) | Loaiza (4–6) | | 40,355 | 66–32 | W1 |
| 99 | July 24 | at Cleveland | 9–7 | Bonderman (11–4) | Lee (9–8) | Jones (26) | 19,045 | 67–32 | W2 |
| 100 | July 25 | at Cleveland | 12–7 | Davis (3–1) | Rogers (11–4) | | 28,085 | 67–33 | L1 |
| 101 | July 26 | at Cleveland | 4–1 | Verlander (13–4) | Sabathia (7–7) | Jones (27) | 31,220 | 68–33 | W1 |
| 102 | July 28 | at Minnesota | 3–2 | Rodney (5–3) | Rincon (3–1) | Jones (28) | 45,478 | 69–33 | W2 |
| 103 | July 29 | at Minnesota | 8–6 | Robertson (10–6) | Radke (9–8) | Jones (29) | 45,496 | 70–33 | W3 |
| 104 | July 30 | at Minnesota | 6–4 | Neshek (1–0) | Bonderman (11–5) | Nathan (22) | 43,204 | 70–34 | L1 |
| 105 | July 31 | at Tampa Bay | 7–3 | Fossum (5–4) | Rogers (11–5) | | 15,065 | 70–35 | L2 |

August: 13–16 (Home: 7–7; Away: 6–9)

| # | Date | Opponent | Score | Win | Loss | Save | Attendance | Record | Streak |
|---|---|---|---|---|---|---|---|---|---|
| 106 | August 1 | at Tampa Bay | 10–4 | Verlander (14–4) | Howell (0–1) | | 13,808 | 71–35 | W1 |
| 107 | August 2 | at Tampa Bay | 8–3 | Grilli (1–1) | Switzer (2–2) | | 13,126 | 72–35 | W2 |
| 108 | August 3 | at Tampa Bay | 2–1 | McClung (3–10) | Robertson (10–7) | Meadows (7) | 12,665 | 72–36 | L1 |
| 109 | August 4 | Cleveland | 7–6 | Colon (2–0) | Cabrera (1–2) | Jones (30) | 41,502 | 73–36 | W1 |
| 110 | August 5 | Cleveland | 4–3 | Zumaya (6–1) | Carmona (1–7) | | 43,015 | 74–36 | W2 |
| 111 | August 6 | Cleveland | 1–0 | Ledezma (2–1) | Sabathia (8–8) | Jones (31) | 39,178 | 75–36 | W3 |
| 112 | August 7 | Minnesota | 9–3 | Miner (7–2) | Liriano (12–3) | | 34,870 | 76–36 | W4 |
| 113 | August 8 | Minnesota | 4–2 | Radke (11–8) | Robertson (10–8) | Nathan (24) | 35,624 | 76–37 | L1 |
| 114 | August 9 | Minnesota | 4–3 | Santana (13–5) | Zumaya (6–2) | Nathan (25) | 36,339 | 76–38 | L2 |
| 115 | August 11 | at Chicago Sox | 5–0 | Contreras (11–4) | Verlander (14–5) | | 39,378 | 76–39 | L3 |
| 116 | August 12 | at Chicago Sox | 4–3 | MacDougal (1–0) | Rogers (11–6) | Jenks (32) | 38,873 | 76–40 | L4 |
| 117 | August 13 | at Chicago Sox | 7–3 | Garcia (11–7) | Miner (7–3) | Jenks (33) | 38,931 | 76–41 | L5 |
| 118 | August 14 | at Boston | 7–4 | Robertson (11–8) | Beckett (13–7) | Jones (32) | 36,392 | 77–41 | W1 |
| 119 | August 15 | at Boston | 3–2 | Rodney (6–3) | Timlin (5–2) | Jones (33) | 36,179 | 78–41 | W2 |
| 120 | August 16 | at Boston | 6–4 | Wells (2–2) | Verlander (14–6) | Papelbon (32) | 36,304 | 78–42 | L1 |
| 121 | August 17 | Texas | 4–2 | Rogers (12–6) | Volquez (1–2) | Jones (34) | 34,756 | 79–42 | W1 |
| 122 | August 18 | Texas | 2–1 | Millwood (12–8) | Miner (7–4) | Otsuka (24) | 39,327 | 79–43 | L1 |
| 123 | August 19 | Texas | 3–1 | Tejeda (2–3) | Robertson (11–9) | Otsuka (25) | 41,643 | 79–44 | L2 |
| 124 | August 20 | Texas | 7–6 | Benoit (1–1) | Grilli (1–2) | Otsuka (26) | 39,071 | 79–45 | L3 |
| 125 | August 21 | Chicago Sox | 7–1 | Verlander (15–6) | Contreras (11–6) | | 39,278 | 80–45 | W1 |
| 126 | August 22 | Chicago Sox | 4–0 | Rogers (13–6) | Buehrle (10–11) | | 39,361 | 81–45 | W2 |
| 127 | August 23 | Chicago Sox | 7–5 | Garcia (12–8) | Miner (7–5) | Jenks (36) | 40,187 | 81–46 | L1 |
| 128 | August 24 | Chicago Sox | 10–0 | Garland (15–4) | Robertson (11–10) | | 41,565 | 81–47 | L2 |
| 129 | August 25 | at Cleveland | 4–2 | Sowers (6–3) | Bonderman (11–6) | Betancourt (1) | 33,416 | 81–48 | L3 |
| 130 | August 26 | at Cleveland | 8–5 | Westbrook (11–8) | Verlander (15–7) | Mastny (3) | 29,138 | 81–49 | L4 |
| 131 | August 27 | at Cleveland | 7–1 | Rogers (14–6) | Lee (10–10) | | 28,342 | 82–49 | W1 |
| 132 | August 29 | at NY Yankees | 2–0 | Wang (16–5) | Robertson (11–11) | Rivera (32) | 52,585 | 82–50 | L1 |
| 133 | August 30 | at NY Yankees | 5–3 | Grilli (2–2) | Proctor (5–4) | Jones (35) | 54,509 | 83–50 | W1 |
| 134 | August 31 | at NY Yankees | 6–4 | Johnson (15–10) | Bonderman (11–7) | Rivera (33) | 54,771 | 83–51 | L1 |

September/October: 12–16 (Home: 6–11; Away: 6–5)

| # | Date | Opponent | Score | Win | Loss | Save | Attendance | Record | Streak |
|---|---|---|---|---|---|---|---|---|---|
| 135 | September 1 | LA Angels | 9–0 | Rogers (15–6) | Santana (13–7) | | 37,509 | 84–51 | W1 |
| 136 | September 2 | LA Angels | 7–2 | Rodriguez (2–2) | Jones (2–6) | | 37,826 | 84–52 | L1 |
| 137 | September 3 | LA Angels | 2–1 | Escobar (10–12) | Ledezma (2–2) | Rodriguez (38) | 38,688 | 84–53 | L2 |
| 138 | September 4 | Seattle | 6–2 | Robertson (12–11) | Washburn (8–13) | | 32,948 | 85–53 | W1 |
| 139 | September 5 | Seattle | 4–3 | Pineiro (8–11) | Miller (0–1) | Putz (30) | 23,583 | 85–54 | L1 |
| 140 | September 6 | Seattle | 5–4 | Huber (1–0) | Zumaya (6–3) | Putz (31) | 23,066 | 85–55 | L2 |
| 141 | September 7 | at Minnesota | 7–2 | Verlander (16–7) | Baker (4–8) | | 21,229 | 86–55 | W1 |
| 142 | September 8 | at Minnesota | 9–5 | Neshek (4–1) | Ledezma (2–3) | | 29,042 | 86–56 | L1 |
| 143 | September 9 | at Minnesota | 2–1 | Bonser (5–5) | Robertson (12–12) | Nathan (30) | 39,160 | 86–57 | L2 |
| 144 | September 10 | at Minnesota | 12–1 | Santana (18–5) | Bonderman (11–8) | | 40,158 | 86–58 | L3 |
| 145 | September 12 | Texas | 3–2 | Rodney (7–3) | Mahay (1–3) | | 24,196 | 87–58 | W1 |
| 146 | September 13 | Texas | 11–3 | Millwood (15–10) | Verlander (16–8) | | 24,672 | 87–59 | L1 |
| 147 | September 15 | Baltimore | 17–2 | Bonderman (12–8) | Penn (0–3) | | 38,261 | 88–59 | W1 |
| 148 | September 16 | Baltimore | 2–0 | Robertson (13–12) | Benson (10–11) | Jones (36) | 39,030 | 89–59 | W2 |
| 149 | September 17 | Baltimore | 12–8 | Ray (3–4) | Grilli (2–3) | | 37,464 | 89–60 | L1 |
| 150 | September 18 | at Chicago Sox | 8–2 | Rogers (16–6) | Buehrle (12–13) | | 39,427 | 90–60 | W1 |
| 151 | September 19 | at Chicago Sox | 7–0 | Garcia (15–9) | Verlander (16–9) | | 38,850 | 90–61 | L1 |
| 152 | September 20 | at Chicago Sox | 6–2 | Bonderman (13–8) | Garland (17–6) | | 38,971 | 91–61 | W1 |
| 153 | September 21 | at Baltimore | 4–3 | Benson (11–11) | Rodney (7–4) | Ray (33) | 17,877 | 91–62 | L1 |
| 154 | September 22 | at Kansas City | 7–3 | Ledezma (3–3) | Hudson (7–6) | | 13,151 | 92–62 | W1 |
| 155 | September 23 | at Kansas City | 15–4 | Rogers (17–6) | Redman (10–10) | | 15,459 | 93–62 | W2 |
| 156 | September 24 | at Kansas City | 11–4 | Verlander (17–9) | Hernandez (6–10) | | 10,922 | 94–62 | W3 |
| 157 | September 26 | Toronto | 4–3 | Bonderman (14–8) | McGowan (1–2) | Jones (37) | 27,908 | 95–62 | W4 |
| 158 | September 27 | Toronto | 7–4 | Lilly (15–13) | Robertson (13–13) | Ryan (36) | 26,430 | 95–63 | L1 |
| 159 | September 28 | Toronto | 8–6 | Burnett (10–8) | Rogers (17–7) | Ryan (37) | 28,670 | 95–64 | L2 |
| 160 | September 29 | Kansas City | 9–7 | Greinke (1–0) | Walker (0–1) | Peralta (1) | 37,243 | 95–65 | L3 |
| 161 | September 30 | Kansas City | 9–6 | Wellemeyer (1–2) | Miner (7–6) | Gobble (2) | 40,071 | 95–66 | L4 |
| 162 | October 1 | Kansas City | 10–8 | Gobble (4–6) | Rogers (17–8) | | 40,155 | 95–67 | L5 |

== Player stats ==
=== Batting ===
Note: Pos = Position, G = Games played, AB = At bats, H = Hits, Avg. = Batting average, HR = Home runs, RBI = Runs batted in

| Player | Pos | G | AB | H | Avg. | HR | RBI |
|---|---|---|---|---|---|---|---|
| Carlos Guillén | SS | 153 | 543 | 174 | .320 | 19 | 85 |
| Iván Rodríguez | C | 136 | 547 | 164 | .300 | 13 | 69 |
| Magglio Ordóñez | RF | 155 | 593 | 177 | .298 | 24 | 104 |
| Plácido Polanco | 2B | 110 | 461 | 136 | .295 | 4 | 52 |
| Vance Wilson | C | 56 | 152 | 43 | .283 | 5 | 18 |
| Brent Clevlen | OF | 31 | 39 | 11 | .282 | 3 | 6 |
| Omar Infante | 2B | 78 | 224 | 62 | .277 | 4 | 25 |
| Chris Shelton | 1B | 115 | 373 | 102 | .273 | 16 | 47 |
| Alexis Gómez | LF | 62 | 103 | 28 | .272 | 1 | 6 |
| Curtis Granderson | CF | 159 | 596 | 155 | .260 | 19 | 68 |
| Marcus Thames | LF | 110 | 348 | 89 | .256 | 26 | 60 |
| Craig Monroe | LF | 147 | 541 | 138 | .255 | 28 | 92 |
| Brandon Inge | 3B | 159 | 542 | 137 | .253 | 27 | 83 |
| Dmitri Young | DH | 48 | 172 | 43 | .250 | 7 | 23 |
| Sean Casey | 1B | 53 | 184 | 45 | .245 | 5 | 30 |
| Matt Stairs | DH | 14 | 41 | 10 | .244 | 2 | 8 |
| Ramón Santiago | SS | 43 | 80 | 18 | .225 | 0 | 3 |
| Neifi Pérez | 2B | 21 | 65 | 13 | .200 | 0 | 5 |
| Jack Hannahan | 1B | 3 | 9 | 0 | .000 | 0 | 0 |
| Kevin Hooper | 2B | 8 | 3 | 0 | .000 | 0 | 0 |
| Mike Rabelo | DH | 1 | 1 | 0 | .000 | 0 | 0 |
| Pitcher totals | — | 162 | 25 | 3 | .120 | 0 | 1 |
| Team totals | — | 162 | 5642 | 1548 | .274 | 203 | 785 |

Note: Individual pitchers' batting statistics not included

=== Pitching ===
==== Starting and other pitchers ====
Note: G = Games pitched, IP = Innings pitched, W = Wins, L = Losses, ERA = Earned run average, SO = Strikeouts

| Player | G | IP | W | L | ERA | SO |
|---|---|---|---|---|---|---|
| Wil Ledezma (2 HLD) | 24 | 60.1 | 3 | 3 | 3.58 | 39 |
| Justin Verlander | 30 | 186.0 | 17 | 9 | 3.63 | 124 |
| Kenny Rogers | 34 | 204.0 | 17 | 8 | 3.84 | 99 |
| Nate Robertson | 32 | 208.2 | 13 | 13 | 3.84 | 137 |
| Jeremy Bonderman | 34 | 214.0 | 14 | 8 | 4.08 | 202 |
| Mike Maroth | 13 | 53.2 | 5 | 2 | 4.19 | 24 |
| Zach Miner (1 HLD) | 27 | 93.0 | 7 | 6 | 4.84 | 59 |

==== Relief pitchers ====
Note: G = Games pitched, IP = Innings Pitched; W = Wins, L = Losses, SV = Saves, HLD = Holds, ERA = Earned run average, SO = Strikeouts

| Player | G | IP | W | L | SV | HLD | ERA | SO |
|---|---|---|---|---|---|---|---|---|
| Chad Durbin | 3 | 6.0 | 0 | 0 | 0 | 0 | 1.50 | 3 |
| Joel Zumaya | 62 | 83.1 | 6 | 3 | 1 | 30 | 1.94 | 97 |
| Jamie Walker | 56 | 48.0 | 0 | 1 | 0 | 11 | 2.81 | 37 |
| Colby Lewis | 2 | 3.0 | 0 | 0 | 0 | 0 | 3.00 | 5 |
| Chris Spurling | 9 | 11.1 | 0 | 0 | 0 | 0 | 3.18 | 4 |
| Fernando Rodney | 63 | 71.2 | 7 | 4 | 7 | 18 | 3.52 | 65 |
| Todd Jones | 62 | 64.0 | 2 | 6 | 37 | 0 | 3.94 | 28 |
| Jason Grilli | 51 | 62.0 | 2 | 3 | 0 | 9 | 4.21 | 31 |
| Román Colón | 20 | 38.2 | 2 | 0 | 1 | 3 | 4.89 | 25 |
| Andrew Miller | 8 | 10.1 | 0 | 1 | 0 | 1 | 6.10 | 6 |
| Jordan Tata | 8 | 14.2 | 0 | 0 | 0 | 0 | 6.14 | 6 |
| Bobby Seay | 14 | 15.1 | 0 | 0 | 0 | 0 | 6.46 | 12 |
| Team Pitching Totals | 162 | 1448.0 | 95 | 67 | 46 | 75 | 3.84 | 1003 |

=== Postseason game log ===
2006 Postseason Game Log: 8–5 (Home: 5–1; Away: 3–4)
AL Division Series: 3–1 (Home: 2–0; Away: 1–1)

| # | Date | Opponent | Score | Win | Loss | Save | Attendance | Record |
|---|---|---|---|---|---|---|---|---|
| 1 | October 3 | @ Yankees | 4–8 | Chien-Ming Wang (1–0) | Nate Robertson (0–1) | — | 56,291 | 0–1 |
| 2 | October 5 | @ Yankees | 4–3 | Jamie Walker (1–0) | Mike Mussina (0–1) | Todd Jones (1) | 56,252 | 1–1 |
| 3 | October 6 | Yankees | 6–0 | Kenny Rogers (1–0) | Randy Johnson (0–1) | — | 43,440 | 2–1 |
| 4 | October 7 | Yankees | 8–3 | Jeremy Bonderman (1–0) | Jaret Wright (0–1) | — | 43,126 | 3–1 |

AL Championship Series: 4–0 (Home: 2–0; Away: 2–0)

| # | Date | Opponent | Score | Win | Loss | Save | Attendance | Record |
|---|---|---|---|---|---|---|---|---|
| 1 | October 10 | @ Athletics | 5–1 | Nate Robertson (1–1) | Barry Zito (1–1) | — | 35,655 | 1–0 |
| 2 | October 11 | @ Athletics | 8–5 | Justin Verlander (1–0) | Esteban Loaiza (0–1) | Todd Jones (2) | 36,168 | 2–0 |
| 3 | October 13 | Athletics | 3–0 | Kenny Rogers (2–0) | Rich Harden (0–1) | Todd Jones (3) | 41,669 | 3–0 |
| 4 | October 14 | Athletics | 6–3 | Wil Ledezma (1–0) | Huston Street (0–1) | — | 42,967 | 4–0 |

World Series: 1–4 (Home: 1–1; Away: 0–3)

| # | Date | Opponent | Score | Win | Loss | Save | Attendance | Record |
|---|---|---|---|---|---|---|---|---|
| 1 | October 21 | Cardinals | 2–7 | Anthony Reyes (1–0) | Justin Verlander (1–1) | — | 42,479 | 0–1 |
| 2 | October 22 | Cardinals | 3–1 | Kenny Rogers (3–0) | Jeff Weaver (2–2) | Todd Jones (4) | 42,533 | 1–1 |
| 3 | October 24 | @ Cardinals | 0–5 | Chris Carpenter (3–1) | Nate Robertson (1–2) | — | 46,513 | 1–2 |
| 4 | October 26 | @ Cardinals | 4–5 | Adam Wainwright (1–0) | Joel Zumaya (0–1) | — | 46,470 | 1–3 |
| 5 | October 27 | @ Cardinals | 2–4 | Jeff Weaver (3–2) | Justin Verlander (1–2) | Adam Wainwright (4) | 46,638 | 1–4 |

=== American League Division Series ===
The New York Yankees were heavy favorites over the Tigers to win the series because of their "modern-day Murderers' Row" lineup. All nine batters were current or former All-Stars. The Yankees won the first game, 8–4.

In Game 2, the Tigers took an early 1–0 lead before Johnny Damon hit a three-run homer for New York in the 4th inning. The Tigers came back with single runs in the 5th, 6th, and 7th, including a game-tying home run by Carlos Guillén and a go-ahead RBI triple by Curtis Granderson, to come from behind to win, 4–3.

In Game 3, which was the first postseason game played in Detroit since 1987 (and the first ever at Comerica Park), the Tigers shut out the Yankees, 6–0. Kenny Rogers pitched 7 2/3 scoreless innings and struck out eight in winning for the first time in his postseason career and defeated the Yankees for the first time since 1993.

In Game 4, the Tigers defeated the Yankees 8–3 to win the American League Division Series, 3 games to 1. Jeremy Bonderman threw a perfect game through five innings, and allowed just one run on five singles over his 8 1/3 innings in giving the Tigers a second straight dominating starting pitching performance. It gave the Tigers their first postseason series victory since 1984

The final out kicked off a celebration of players and fans throughout Comerica Park and Downtown Detroit. The celebration included Kenny Rogers pouring champagne over a Detroit Police officer's head. In the process of winning the final three games, the Tigers held the Yankees lineup scoreless for 20 2/3 consecutive innings (from the 4th inning of Game 2 until the 7th inning of Game 4) while scoring 17 runs in that span.

=== American League Championship Series ===
The Tigers faced the Oakland Athletics, winners of the American League Western Division, marking their first postseason matchup since 1972.

The A's had defeated the Twins in a three-game sweep in the ALDS.

The Tigers won Game 1, 5–1, as Nate Robertson scattered six hits and three walks over his five shutout innings. In the fourth inning, with men on second and third and nobody out, Robertson memorably struck out the side to preserve his own victory.

Detroit won Game 2, 8–5. Oakland had an early two-run lead before the Tigers' four-run fourth inning gave them the lead for good. Seldom-used outfielder Alexis Gómez got the surprise start as the designated hitter. Gómez hit a homer and drove in four runs, providing another example of Jim Leyland pushing all the right buttons this season.

Returning to Comerica Park for Game 3, the Tigers shut out the A's, 3–0 behind Rogers who allowed only two singles and ran his scoreless streak to 15 innings. The A's did not get a hit off relievers Fernando Rodney and Todd Jones. The two hits were the fewest allowed in a postseason game in franchise history.

In Game 4, with Detroit looking for the sweep, Oakland jumped out to an early 3–0 lead. The Tigers fought back with two runs in the fifth inning, on RBI doubles by Granderson and Monroe, before Magglio Ordóñez tied it with a solo home run in the sixth.

In the bottom of the ninth with the game still tied, two outs and Polanco and Monroe on first and second base respectively, Ordóñez hit his second home run of the night, a three-run walk-off home run off of A's closer Huston Street that sent the Tigers to their first World Series since 1984. The Pennant was the 10th in Tigers history, and the ALCS was won on a walk-off home run for only the third time ever.

Both prior instances were by the Yankees: in 1976 when Chris Chambliss homered to defeat Kansas City and in 2003 when Aaron Boone hit a 10th inning home run to beat the Boston Red Sox.

=== World Series ===
Regardless of the outcome for the 2006 World Series, one manager would join Sparky Anderson as the only skippers in history to manage teams from both the AL and NL to a title. Cardinals manager Tony La Russa, who considers Anderson his mentor, won the 1989 World Series with the Athletics, while Tigers manager Jim Leyland had won the 1997 World Series with the Marlins.

The Cardinals won the first game of the World Series in Detroit 7–2, behind excellent pitching from unheralded Cardinals starter Anthony Reyes.

In Game Two, Kenny Rogers continued his astounding postseason, allowing two hits and no runs through eight innings, as the Tigers triumphed 3–1.

But the Tigers lost the next three games. They were shut out 5–0 in game three by Cardinals starter Chris Carpenter; they lost a 5–4 heartbreaker in game four; and in game 5, the Tigers committed two costly errors, lost a 2–1 lead, and fell 4–2. In the first inning rookie pitcher Justin Verlander threw two wild pitches, tying the Series record (AP); this was in sharp contrast to the five total that he had thrown in all of his previous games. Verlander would go on to commit a throwing error in the fourth inning, allowing the tying run to score.

In the series, the Tigers committed eight errors, five by the pitching staff alone, the most in World Series history.

The Tigers would not return to the postseason until 2011 and they would not appear in the Fall Classic again until 2012.

=== Postseason player stats ===
==== Batting ====
Note: G = Games played, AB = At bats, H = Hits, Avg. = Batting average, HR = Home runs, RBI = Runs batted in

| Player | G | AB | H | Avg. | HR | RBI |
|---|---|---|---|---|---|---|
| Sean Casey | 10 | 37 | 16 | .432 | 2 | 9 |
| Carlos Guillén | 13 | 47 | 17 | .362 | 1 | 4 |
| Alexis Gómez | 6 | 12 | 4 | .333 | 1 | 4 |
| Omar Infante | 2 | 3 | 1 | .333 | 0 | 0 |
| Plácido Polanco | 13 | 51 | 16 | .314 | 0 | 4 |
| Brandon Inge | 13 | 44 | 12 | .273 | 1 | 4 |
| Craig Monroe | 13 | 50 | 12 | .240 | 5 | 9 |
| Marcus Thames | 8 | 21 | 5 | .238 | 0 | 1 |
| Curtis Granderson | 13 | 53 | 12 | .226 | 3 | 7 |
| Magglio Ordóñez | 13 | 51 | 10 | .196 | 3 | 8 |
| Iván Rodríguez | 13 | 48 | 8 | .167 | 1 | 5 |
| Ramón Santiago | 6 | 12 | 1 | .083 | 0 | 0 |
| Neifi Pérez | 3 | 4 | 0 | .000 | 0 | 0 |
| Jeremy Bonderman | 3 | 2 | 0 | .000 | 0 | 0 |
| Justin Verlander | 4 | 2 | 0 | .000 | 0 | 0 |

==== Pitching ====
===== Starting pitchers =====
Note: G = Games pitched, IP = Innings pitched, W = Wins, L = Losses, ERA = Earned run average, SO = Strikeouts

| Player | G | IP | W | L | ERA | SO |
|---|---|---|---|---|---|---|
| Kenny Rogers | 3 | 23 | 3 | 0 | 0.00 | 19 |
| Jeremy Bonderman | 3 | 20 1/3 | 1 | 0 | 3.10 | 11 |
| Nate Robertson | 3 | 15 2/3 | 1 | 2 | 5.17 | 8 |
| Justin Verlander | 4 | 21 2/3 | 1 | 2 | 5.82 | 23 |

===== Relief pitchers =====
Note: G = Games pitched, W = Wins, L = Losses, SV = Saves, HLD = Holds, ERA = Earned run average, SO = Strikeouts

| Player | G | W | L | SV | HLD | ERA | SO |
|---|---|---|---|---|---|---|---|
| Todd Jones | 7 | 0 | 0 | 4 | 0 | 0.00 | 4 |
| Jason Grilli | 5 | 0 | 0 | 0 | 1 | 0.00 | 1 |
| Zach Miner | 1 | 0 | 0 | 0 | 0 | 0.00 | 0 |
| Wilfredo Ledezma | 4 | 1 | 0 | 0 | 1 | 2.25 | 2 |
| Fernando Rodney | 7 | 0 | 0 | 0 | 2 | 2.35 | 9 |
| Joel Zumaya | 6 | 0 | 1 | 0 | 1 | 3.00 | 6 |
| Jamie Walker | 5 | 1 | 0 | 0 | 0 | 4.15 | 3 |

== Farm system ==
| Level | Team | League | Manager |
|---|---|---|---|
| AAA | Toledo Mud Hens | International League | Larry Parrish |
| AA | Erie SeaWolves | Eastern League | Duffy Dyer |
| A | Lakeland Tigers | Florida State League | Mike Rojas |
| A | West Michigan Whitecaps | Midwest League | Matt Walbeck |
| A-Short Season | Oneonta Tigers | New York–Penn League | Tom Brookens |
| Rookie | GCL Tigers | Gulf Coast League | Kevin Bradshaw |

LEAGUE CHAMPIONS: Toledo, West Michigan
