= 2006 American League Championship Series =

37th edition of Major League Baseball's American League Championship Series

| Team (Wins) | Managers | Season |
|---|---|---|
| Detroit Tigers (4) | Jim Leyland | 95–67 (.586), GB: 1 |
| Oakland Athletics (0) | Ken Macha | 93–69 (.574), GA: 4 |
- Dates: October 10–14
- MVP: Plácido Polanco (Detroit)
- Umpires: Jerry Crawford, Hunter Wendelstedt, Derryl Cousins, Chuck Meriwether, Gary Cederstrom, Mike Reilly

Broadcast
- Television: Fox (United States); MLB International (International)
- TV announcers: Thom Brennaman, Steve Lyons (Games 1–3)†, José Mota (Game 4), Lou Piniella, and Chris Myers (Fox) † Lyons was dismissed by Fox after Game 3, for comments which the network deemed insensitive to Piniella's Spanish background. Dave O'Brien and Rick Sutcliffe (MLB International)
- Radio: ESPN
- Radio announcers: Jon Miller and Joe Morgan
- ALDS: Detroit Tigers over New York Yankees (3–1); Oakland Athletics over Minnesota Twins (3–0)

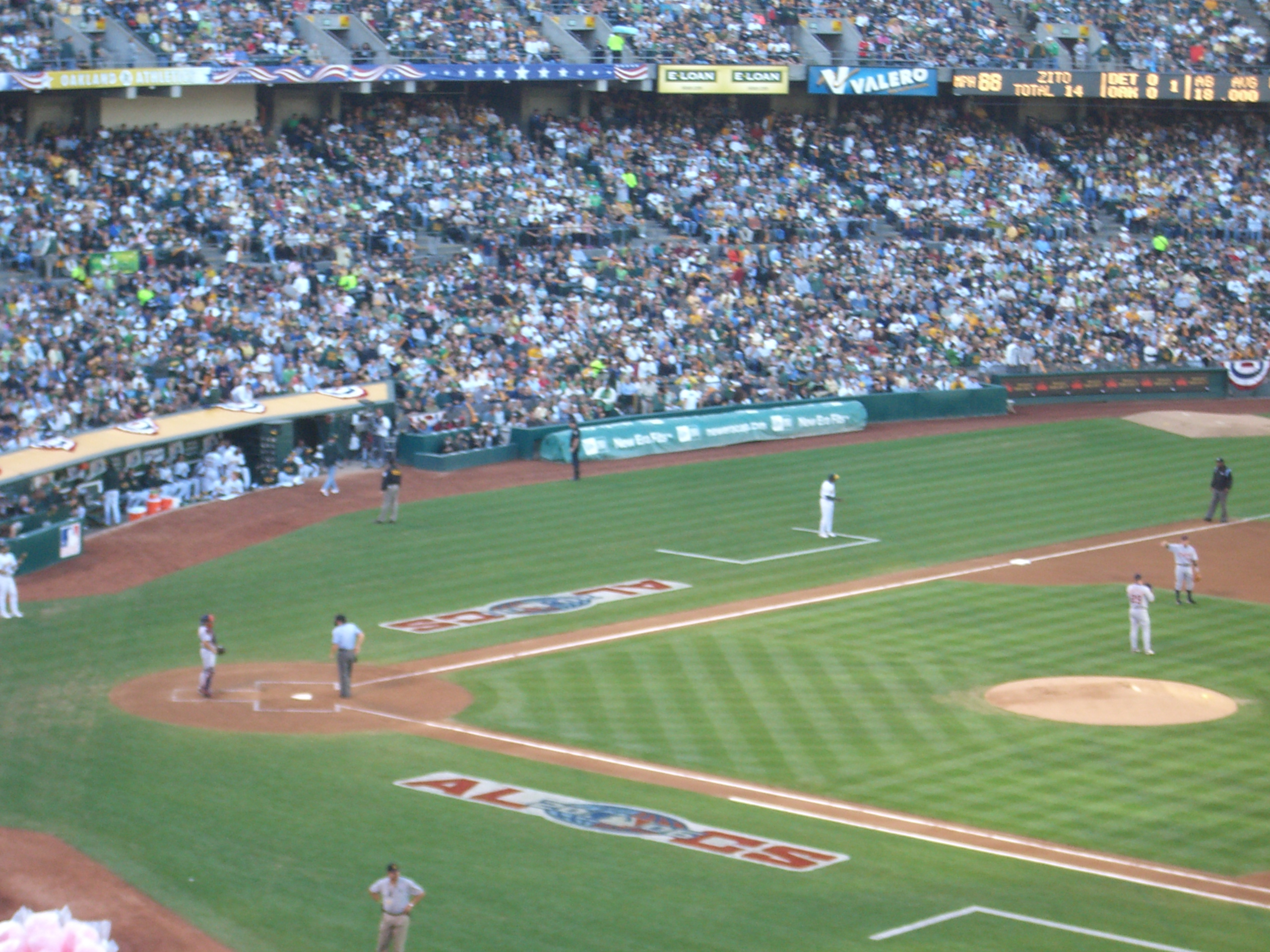
Game 1 in Oakland, California

The 2006 American League Championship Series (ALCS) was a best-of-seven playoff in Major League Baseball's 2006 postseason pitting the third-seeded Oakland Athletics and the fourth-seeded Detroit Tigers for the American League pennant. The Series began on October 10 and ended on October 14. The Athletics had home-field advantage (despite the Tigers having a better regular season record) as the wild card team defers home field advantage in the LCS regardless of regular season record.

The Tigers swept the Athletics to advance to the 2006 World Series, and became the fourth AL team to win at least 10 pennants, joining the New York Yankees (39), the Athletics (15), and the Boston Red Sox (11). Magglio Ordóñez's game-winning walk-off home run in the bottom of the 9th inning of Game 4 sealed the pennant for the Tigers. This ALCS marked the 5th different AL pennant winner in as many years (following 2005 with the White Sox, 2004 with the Red Sox, 2003 with the Yankees, and 2002 with the Angels).

The Tigers faced the National League champion St. Louis Cardinals in the World Series, but lost in five games.

The series was a rematch of the 1972 American League Championship Series (then a best-of-five series), in which Oakland defeated Detroit in 5 games. Detroit manager Jim Leyland, who led the Florida Marlins to the 1997 World Series title, became the seventh manager in history to win pennants in both leagues. It was the second consecutive ALCS without either the Yankees or Red Sox.

== Summary ==
=== Oakland Athletics vs. Detroit Tigers ===
Detroit won the series, 4–0.

| Game | Date | Score | Location | Time | Attendance |
|---|---|---|---|---|---|
| 1 | October 10 | Detroit Tigers – 5, Oakland Athletics – 1 | McAfee Coliseum | 3:20 | 35,655 |
| 2 | October 11 | Detroit Tigers – 8, Oakland Athletics – 5 | McAfee Coliseum | 3:06 | 36,168 |
| 3 | October 13 | Oakland Athletics – 0, Detroit Tigers – 3 | Comerica Park | 2:57 | 41,669 |
| 4 | October 14 | Oakland Athletics – 3, Detroit Tigers – 6 | Comerica Park | 3:23 | 42,967 |

== Game summaries ==
=== Game 1 ===
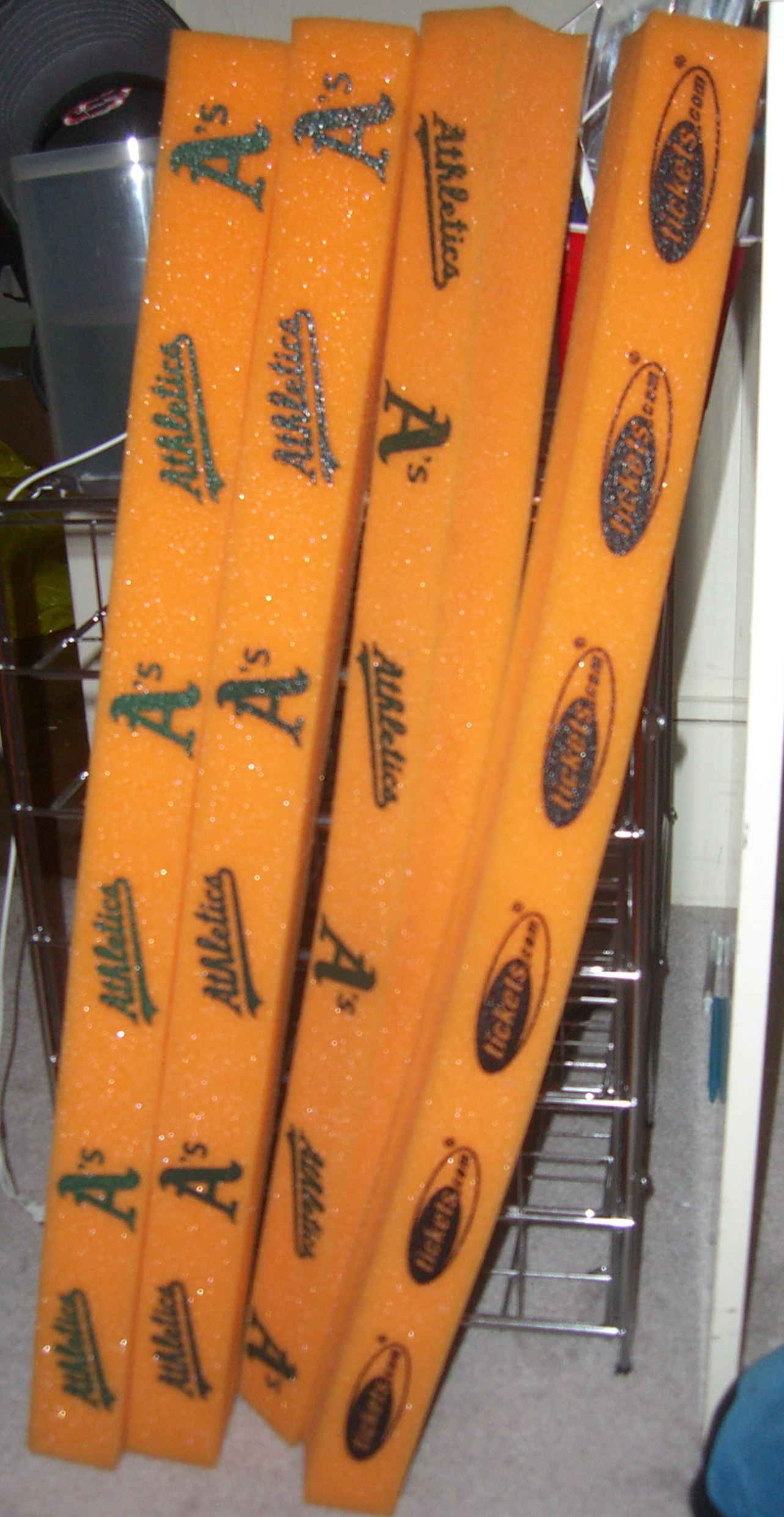
Rally sticks given to fans for Game 1 in Oakland.

October 10, 2006 5:20 pm (PDT) at McAfee Coliseum in Oakland, California 65 °F (18 °C), Mostly Clear
| Team | 1 | 2 | 3 | 4 | 5 | 6 | 7 | 8 | 9 | R | H | E |
|---|---|---|---|---|---|---|---|---|---|---|---|---|
| Detroit | 0 | 0 | 2 | 3 | 0 | 0 | 0 | 0 | 0 | 5 | 11 | 1 |
| Oakland | 0 | 0 | 0 | 0 | 0 | 0 | 0 | 1 | 0 | 1 | 8 | 1 |
WP: Nate Robertson (1–0) LP: Barry Zito (0–1); Home runs: DET: Brandon Inge (1), Iván Rodríguez (1); OAK: None; Attendance: 35,655; Boxscore

Oakland was 0-for-13 with runners in scoring position, while Detroit turned four double plays (both are LCS records). Tigers first baseman Sean Casey left the game in the bottom of the sixth inning due to an apparent leg injury. Brandon Inge homered with two outs in the third off Barry Zito, who allowed a double and two walks to load the bases before Magglio Ordóñez's single scored another run. Next inning, Iván Rodríguez hit a leadoff home run off Zito, who then walked Craig Monroe. Marcus Thames then hit into a forceout, advancing to second on D'Angelo Jiménez's error and scoring on Inge's double. Inge moved to third on Curtis Granderson's groundout, then scored on Plácido Polanco's single. Oakland avoided a shutout when Milton Bradley doubled to lead off the eighth off Joel Zumaya, moved to third on Frank Thomas's groundout, and scored on Jay Payton's groundout.

=== Game 2 ===
October 11, 2006 5:21 pm (PDT) at McAfee Coliseum in Oakland, California 66 °F (19 °C), Partly Cloudy
| Team | 1 | 2 | 3 | 4 | 5 | 6 | 7 | 8 | 9 | R | H | E |
|---|---|---|---|---|---|---|---|---|---|---|---|---|
| Detroit | 0 | 1 | 0 | 4 | 0 | 2 | 0 | 0 | 1 | 8 | 11 | 0 |
| Oakland | 1 | 0 | 2 | 0 | 0 | 1 | 1 | 0 | 0 | 5 | 11 | 1 |
WP: Justin Verlander (1–0) LP: Esteban Loaiza (0–1) Sv: Todd Jones (1); Home runs: DET: Alexis Gomez (1), Curtis Granderson (1); OAK: Milton Bradley 2 (2), Eric Chavez (1); Attendance: 36,168; Boxscore

Oakland struck first in Game 2 when Mark Kotsay doubled in the first with one out off Justin Verlander, moved to third on a wild pitch, and scored on Milton Bradley's single, but Detroit tied it when Carlos Guillén doubled to lead off the second off Esteban Loaiza, moved to third on a groundout, and scored on Craig Monroe's sacrifice fly. In the third, Kotsay doubled with two outs off Verlander before Bradley homered to put Oakland up 3–1. In the fourth, Detroit loaded the bases on two singles and a walk with one out off Loaiza before Monroe's single scored a run, Alexis Gomez's 2-run single gave Detroit the lead, and Brandon Inge's sacrifice fly put the Tigers up 5–3. In the sixth, Monroe doubled off Loaiza with two outs before Gomez homered to put Detroit up 7–3. Eric Chavez's leadoff home run off Verlander in the bottom of the inning cut the lead to 7–4. Next inning, Bradley homered with two outs off Wilfredo Ledezma to make it 7–5 Detroit, but the Tigers got that run back in the ninth on Granderson's leadoff home run off Huston Street. In the bottom of the inning, Oakland got three straight two-out singles off Todd Jones to load the bases, but Frank Thomas flew out to center to end the game.

=== Game 3 ===
October 13, 2006 4:31 pm (EDT) at Comerica Park in Detroit, Michigan 45 °F (7 °C), Overcast
| Team | 1 | 2 | 3 | 4 | 5 | 6 | 7 | 8 | 9 | R | H | E |
|---|---|---|---|---|---|---|---|---|---|---|---|---|
| Oakland | 0 | 0 | 0 | 0 | 0 | 0 | 0 | 0 | 0 | 0 | 2 | 0 |
| Detroit | 2 | 0 | 0 | 0 | 1 | 0 | 0 | 0 | X | 3 | 6 | 0 |
WP: Kenny Rogers (1–0) LP: Rich Harden (0–1) Sv: Todd Jones (2); Home runs: OAK: None; DET: Craig Monroe (1); Attendance: 41,669; Boxscore

Oakland infielder Mark Kiger, who was called up from the minors for the ALCS following an injury to Mark Ellis, entered the game in the eighth inning as a defensive replacement for second baseman D'Angelo Jiménez, thereby becoming the first player in modern baseball history to make his major-league debut in a postseason game. Kenny Rogers also continued to dominate, not allowing the Athletics to score once for his second victory in the postseason. Curtis Granderson walked to lead off the first off Rich Harden, moved to third on Craig Monroe's single, and scored on Plácido Polanco's single. Magglio Ordóñez's sacrifice fly made it 2–0 Tigers. Monroe's leadoff home run in the fifth off Harden made it 3–0. Todd Jones picked up his second save with a 1-2-3 ninth.

=== Game 4 ===
October 14, 2006 4:30 pm (EDT) at Comerica Park in Detroit, Michigan 52 °F (11 °C), Sunny
| Team | 1 | 2 | 3 | 4 | 5 | 6 | 7 | 8 | 9 | R | H | E |
|---|---|---|---|---|---|---|---|---|---|---|---|---|
| Oakland | 2 | 0 | 0 | 1 | 0 | 0 | 0 | 0 | 0 | 3 | 8 | 1 |
| Detroit | 0 | 0 | 0 | 0 | 2 | 1 | 0 | 0 | 3 | 6 | 11 | 0 |
WP: Wilfredo Ledezma (1–0) LP: Huston Street (0–1); Home runs: OAK: Jay Payton (1); DET: Magglio Ordóñez 2 (2); Attendance: 42,967; Boxscore

In Game 4, Mark Kotsay walked with one out in the first off Jeremy Bonderman, then scored on Milton Bradley's double. One out later, Bradley scored on Eric Chavez's double to put Oakland up 2–0. Jay Payton homered in the fourth to make it 3–0. In the fifth, however, Brandon Inge singled off Dan Haren, moving to second on an error. After moving to third on a groundout, Inge scored on a double by Curtis Granderson, who then scored on Craig Monroe's double. Magglio Ordóñez homered in the sixth to tie the game at three. In the bottom of the ninth, Huston Street got two outs, then allowed back-to-back singles to Polanco and Monroe before Ordóñez launched a three-run walk-off home run to win the game and advance the Tigers to the 2006 World Series. Ordóñez's blast was the first pennant-winning home run since Aaron Boone's in Game 7 of the 2003 ALCS and came on the 30th anniversary of Chris Chambliss' pennant-winning walk-off in Game 5 of the 1976 ALCS.

== Composite box ==
2006 ALCS (4–0): Detroit Tigers over Oakland Athletics

| Team | 1 | 2 | 3 | 4 | 5 | 6 | 7 | 8 | 9 | R | H | E |
|---|---|---|---|---|---|---|---|---|---|---|---|---|
| Detroit Tigers | 2 | 1 | 2 | 7 | 3 | 3 | 0 | 0 | 4 | 22 | 39 | 1 |
| Oakland Athletics | 3 | 0 | 2 | 1 | 0 | 1 | 1 | 1 | 0 | 9 | 29 | 3 |
Total attendance: 156,459 Average attendance: 39,115

== Aftermath ==
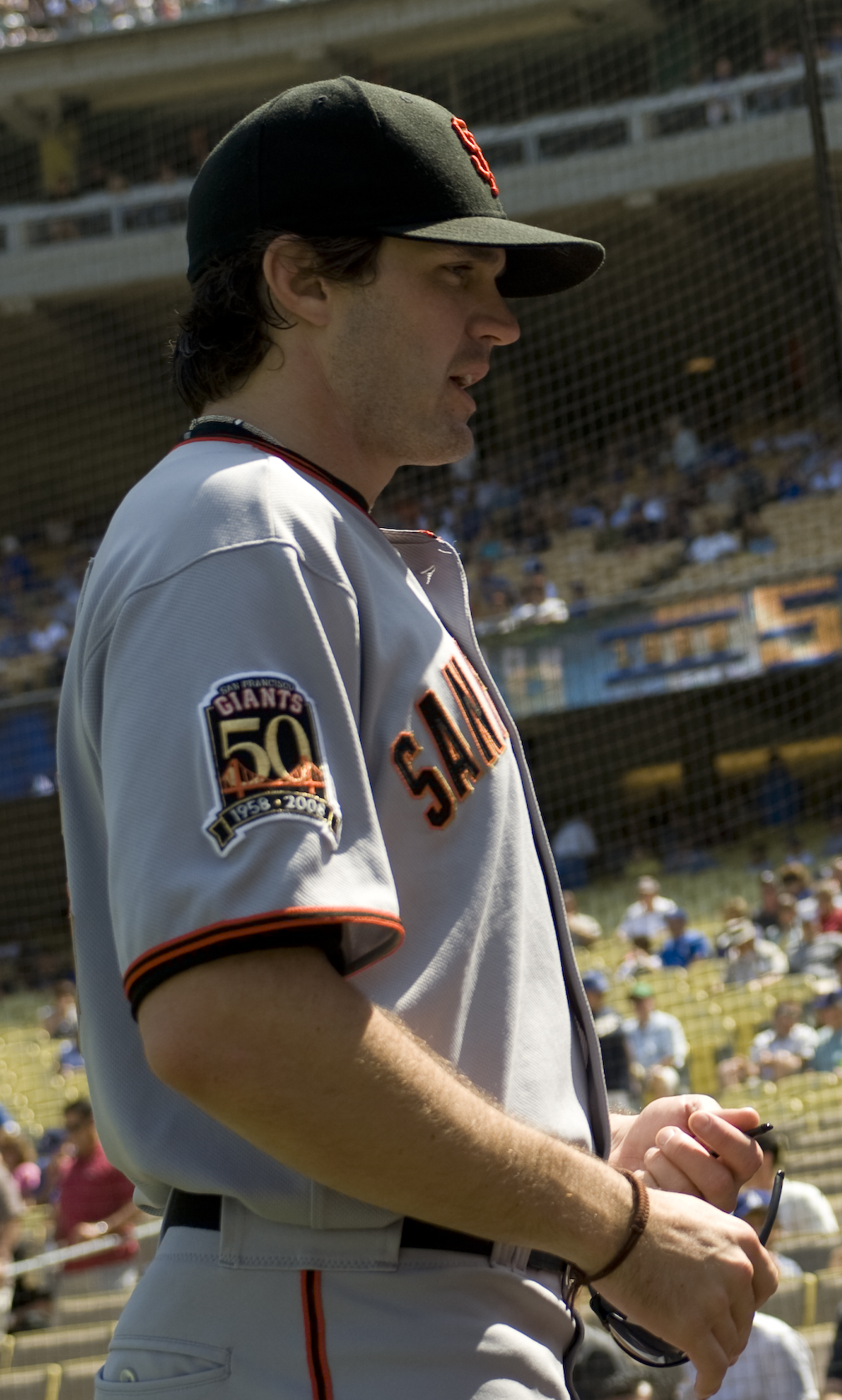
Barry Zito with the Giants in 2008

A few days after the conclusion of the series, Athletics general manager Billy Beane fired manager Ken Macha. Although the Athletics went 368–280 in his four seasons as manager, Macha frustrated management and players throughout his tenure. Macha's fractured relationships with players such as Nick Swisher and Rich Harden had been the source of Bay Area stories for several seasons. Even prior to the 2006 season, there was controversy with Macha as he opted out of the last year of his contract and almost took the Pittsburgh Pirates' manager job, but was later rehired by Oakland for the 2006 season. After his firing following the AL Championship Series, Macha would later serve as the Milwaukee Brewers' manager from 2009 and 2010.

After the season, ace pitcher Barry Zito signed a record seven year free agent contract with the San Francisco Giants, ending his seven-year run with the Athletics. Zito was the last man standing in Oakland's Big Three rotation of Zito, Mark Mulder, and Tim Hudson. From 2000 to 2003, the Big Three helped the Athletics win the division in 2000, 2002, and 2003. In those years, each man made multiple All-Star appearances and Zito won the 2002 Cy Young Award, which is the Athletics' last Cy Young award win to date.

The Tigers and Athletics would meet again in the postseason in the American League Division Series in 2012 and 2013, with the Tigers winning both series in five games. By 2012, Justin Verlander was the only player on either team that played in the 2006 American League Championship Series. Verlander's pitching performance in 2012 and 2013 gave him 30 straight scoreless innings against the Athletics in the playoffs, breaking the record for scoreless innings against one team in the postseason set by Christy Mathewson (28).

Magglio Ordóñez pennant clinching walk-off home run would be the last in MLB until 2014, when San Francisco Giants outfielder Travis Ishikawa hit a three-run home run off of Michael Wacha to send the Giants to the World Series.

As of 2025, the Athletics' and Tigers' World Series droughts have continued. Both franchises have not won a championship since the 1980s (1984 for Detroit and 1989 for Oakland).
