= Todd Jones =

American baseball player (born 1968)

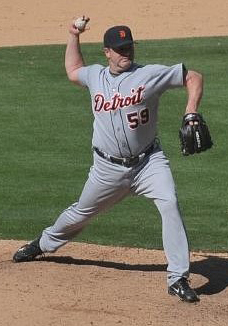
- Jones with the Detroit Tigers in 2008
- Pitcher
- Born: April 24, 1968 (age 58); Marietta, Georgia, U.S.
- Batted: Left Threw: Right

MLB debut
- July 7, 1993, for the Houston Astros

Last MLB appearance
- August 15, 2008, for the Detroit Tigers

MLB statistics
- Win–loss record: 58–63
- Earned run average: 3.97
- Strikeouts: 868
- Saves: 319
- Stats at Baseball Reference

Teams
- Houston Astros (1993–1996); Detroit Tigers (1997–2001); Minnesota Twins (2001); Colorado Rockies (2002–2003); Boston Red Sox (2003); Cincinnati Reds (2004); Philadelphia Phillies (2004); Florida Marlins (2005); Detroit Tigers (2006–2008)

Career highlights and awards
- All-Star (2000); AL Rolaids Relief Man Award (2000); AL saves leader (2000)

Todd Barton Jones (born April 24, 1968) is an American former professional baseball relief pitcher. He batted left-handed and threw right-handed. He was an effective middle reliever for several teams and also filled the role of closer, most notably with the Detroit Tigers for whom he earned 235 of his 319 career saves, most in Tigers history. On September 16, 2007, Jones became the 21st member of the 300-save club during his second stint with the Tigers.

== Baseball career ==
Jones graduated from Osborne High School in Marietta, Georgia, and attended Jacksonville State University in Alabama. He was drafted by the Houston Astros in the first round of the 1989 Major League Baseball draft and made his major league debut during the 1993 season.

Initially a setup reliever, Jones started being used as a closer for the Astros in the 1995 season. His best years came with the Detroit Tigers from 1997–2001, when he notched 142 saves. On April 22, 1999, Jones earned career save number 100. On September 27, 1999, Jones threw the last official pitch at Tiger Stadium, striking out Carlos Beltrán as the Tigers defeated the Kansas City Royals 8–2. Jones' tenure as a Detroit Tiger peaked in 2000, when he converted 42 saves in 46 attempts, made his first and only AL All-Star team, and won the AL Rolaids Relief Man Award. The 42 saves established a new Tigers team record, surpassing John Hiller's 38 saves in 1973. The record would stand until 2011, when it was broken by José Valverde.

Jones could not continue his success into the 2001 season. After blowing 6 of his first 17 save opportunities, Jones lost his closer role and the Tigers traded him to the Minnesota Twins on July 28, 2001. After the 2001 season, Jones became a free agent and signed with the Colorado Rockies. While playing for the Rockies in April 2003, Jones made remarks criticized as anti-gay comments during a discussion of the play Take Me Out. Jones publicly apologized, but did not retract his comments. He shifted to the Boston Red Sox midway through the season. He made his first career postseason appearance that year, pitching to three batters in Game 6 of the ALCS as the third Red Sox pitcher against the New York Yankees. In the sixth inning, he allowed a hit while garnering a strikeout and a walk before being taken out for Alan Embree. The Red Sox won the game 9-6 with six pitchers used, but they lost the ALCS the next night. Jones left the Red Sox after the season.

Following a 2004 season spent with the Cincinnati Reds and Philadelphia Phillies, Jones signed a one-year contract with the Florida Marlins. After an injury to incumbent closer Guillermo Mota, Jones took on the role for the first time since 2001. He finished the 2005 season with a 2.10 ERA and 40 saves, surpassing 200 career saves during this season.

On December 8, 2005, Jones signed a two-year contract to return to the Tigers. In 2006, he also participated in the inaugural World Baseball Classic. On May 21, 2006, he became the Detroit Tigers' all-time leader in saves, passing Mike Henneman. Jones saved 37 games for the 2006 Tigers, who made the postseason for the first time since 1987. He would appear in seven postseason games for the Tigers: two in the ALDS, three in the ALCS, and two in the World Series, pitching the ninth inning in each occasion. He converted four saves and allowed one total run (unearned) throughout the postseason. His last postseason appearance was Game 2 of the 2006 World Series, as he finished the only victory that the Tigers would garner against the St. Louis Cardinals. Jones retired with a postseason ERA of 0.00 in seven innings.

On September 16, 2007, Jones worked out of a bases-loaded ninth-inning jam against the Minnesota Twins to earn his 300th career save, becoming the 21st member of baseball's 300 save club. The Tigers re-signed Jones to a one-year contract for the 2008 season. On July 27, Jones lost his role as the Tigers' closer to Fernando Rodney. On September 25, 2008, the 40-year old Jones announced his retirement from Major League Baseball.

== Pitching style ==
Jones was a finesse pitcher and showed good durability. In every season from 1995 through 2007, he pitched in at least 51 games. His main pitch was a low-90s fastball that he could sink or cut, and he pitched to contact. He only had one season (2000) in which he recorded more strikeouts than innings pitched. He also incorporated an occasional low-70s curve ball. Though he didn't have overpowering stuff, he kept hitters off-balance and rarely got rattled. He was a ground-ball pitcher, allowing only 22% fly balls over his career versus 47.2% ground balls.

== Post-playing career ==
Jones joined the Tigers television broadcast team on FanDuel Sports Network Detroit as a studio analyst beginning in the 2023 season, and as of 2025 is one of the two primary in-game analysts.

== Personal life ==
Jones is a devout Christian, and is known for using Contemporary Christian music when entering from the bullpen. During the 2006 playoffs, he entered to "Last One Standing" by MercyMe.

Since 2002, Jones has been writing a weekly column, "The Closer", for The Sporting News and Jones was on the cover of the baseball preview issue with the caption "Don't Tell columnist Todd Jones but (Beware of The Tigers)".

Jones currently resides in Pell City, Alabama with his wife Michelle and his son Alex (born October 7, 1994) and daughter Abby (born May 22, 1997). He currently works as an adviser for the local high school and middle school boys baseball teams, and occasionally appears as a guest analyst for Detroit Tigers television broadcasts.

== Awards and accomplishments ==
- All-Star (2000)
- AL Relief Man of the Year (2000)
- Led American League in saves (42 in 2000), which also established a Detroit Tigers' single-season record. The record stood until 2011, when it was broken by José Valverde.
- Along with Juan Rincón, led MLB with 11 relief wins (2004)
- Leads Florida Marlins in consecutive save conversions (27, 2005)
- Ranked 14th in all-time saves (319) when he retired, and ranks 23rd as of 2025
- Ranks first all-time among Detroit Tigers relievers with 235 saves
- Made first World Series appearance in second stint with Tigers (2006)
- Appeared on the cover of The Sporting News (March/April 2007)

== See also ==
- Best pitching seasons by a Detroit Tiger
- List of Colorado Rockies team records
- List of Major League Baseball annual saves leaders
