= Alexis Gómez (baseball) =

Dominican baseball player (born 1978)

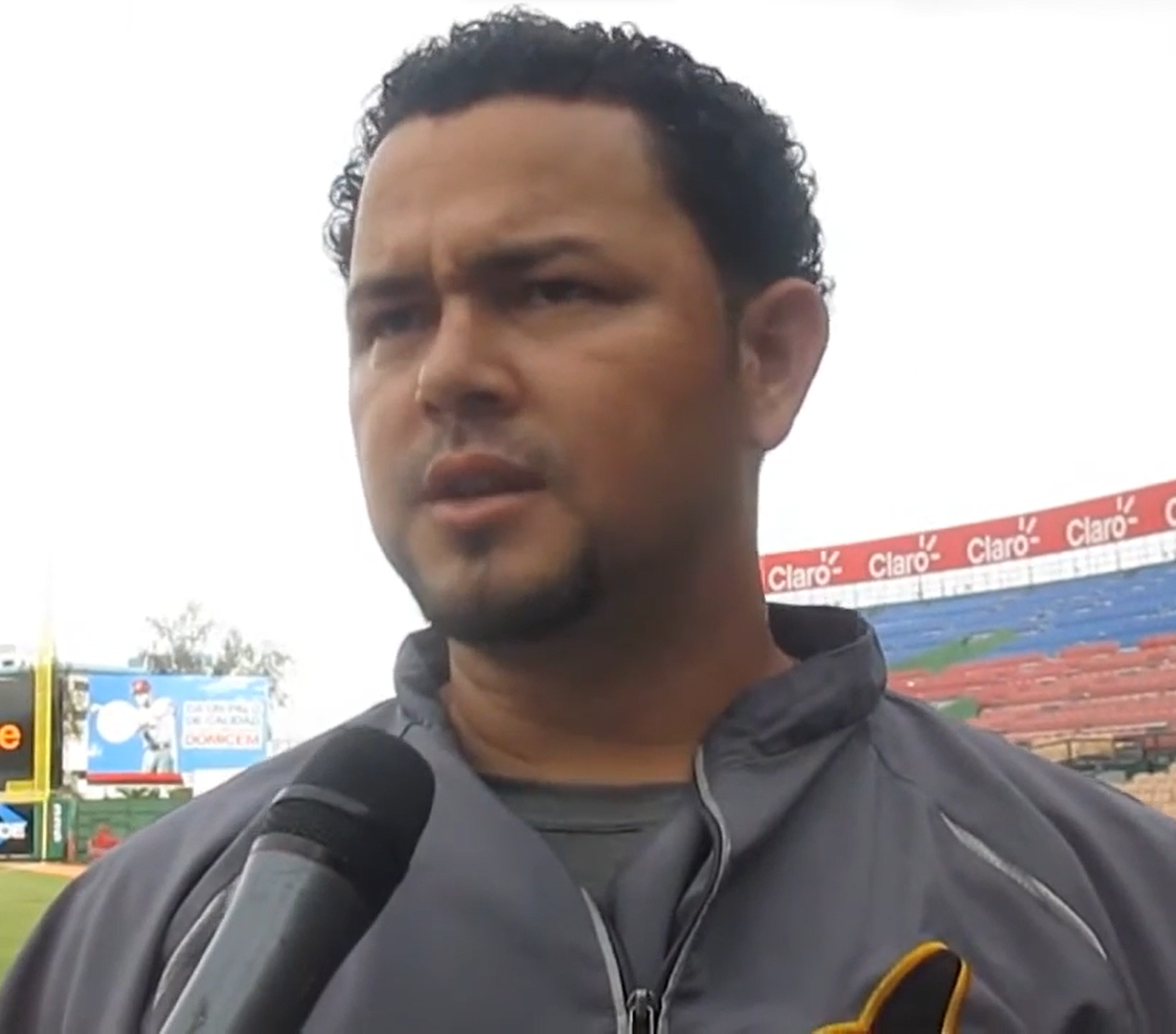
- Gómez with Águilas Cibaeñas in 2013
- Outfielder
- Born: August 8, 1978 (age 47); Loma de Cabrera, Dominican Republic
- Batted: Left Threw: Left

Professional debut
- MLB: June 16, 2002, for the Kansas City Royals
- NPB: March 28, 2014, for the Chunichi Dragons

Last appearance
- MLB: September 28, 2006, for the Detroit Tigers
- NPB: July 26, 2014, for the Chunichi Dragons

MLB statistics
- Batting average: .259
- Home runs: 1
- Runs batted in: 11

NPB statistics
- Batting average: .077
- Home runs: 0
- Runs batted in: 0
- Stats at Baseball Reference

Teams
- Kansas City Royals (2002, 2004); Detroit Tigers (2005–2006); Chunichi Dragons (2014)
Medals
Men's baseball
Representing Dominican Republic
Central American and Caribbean Games
Gold medal – first place	2010 Mayagüez	Team

Alexis de Jesús Gómez (born August 8, 1978) is a Dominican former professional baseball outfielder. He played in Major League Baseball (MLB) for the Kansas City Royals and Detroit Tigers, and in Nippon Professional Baseball (NPB) for the Chunichi Dragons.

== Minor leagues ==
Gómez was signed as a non-drafted free agent on February 21, 1997. He spent his first two professional seasons with the DSL Royals of the Dominican Summer League. Gómez hit .351 with 51 runs scored and 42 RBI in 64 games in his first professional season. In 1998, he batted .283 with one home run and 34 RBI while playing 67 games.

In 1999, Gómez played 56 games with the GCL Royals of the Gulf Coast League and batted .276 with 31 RBI and five home runs. That season he was ranked third in the league for the most at-bats, runs scored and games played, while ending in hits and home runs.

In 2000, Gómez played 121 games of High-A baseball with the Wilmington Blue Rocks of the Carolina League. He batted .254 and tied for second in the club with 63 runs. That season, he also recorded 29 multi-hit games, including six three-hit contests.

Gómez spent the first two months of the 2001 season again with Wilmington, batting .302 in 48 games for the Blue Rocks before earning a promotion to Wichita Wranglers of the Texas League for Double-A baseball. He played 83 games, and pounded out 96 hits while batting .281 and also scoring 55 runs. He led the Wranglers in stolen bases and triples with 16 and 6, respectively. From April 19 through May 10 of the 2001 season, Gómez put together an 18-game hitting streak for the Blue Rocks. During that stretch, he batted .485 (33 for 68) and drove in a run or scored a run in 16 of those 18 games. With the Wranglers, Gómez also had another 18-game hitting streak from July 30 through August 19 in which he batted a .368 average.

In 2002, Gómez made his major league debut with Kansas City on June 16, picking up a hit in four trips to the plate. He played five games with the team, and went 2-for-10 before being optioned back to the Wranglers on June 30. After being optioned back to the Wranglers, Gómez played the remainder of the season with the team, posting good numbers in the season. He hit .295 (10th in the league) in 114 games, knocking in 75 runs while also hitting 14 home runs. He stole 36 bases (fourth in the league) and also hit 21 doubles and eight triples.

Gómez was commended for his superb performance by being named to the Texas League All-Star team at the middle of the season and again at the conclusion of the season. He was also named the Player of the Week between April 15 and April 21, and was ranked the ninth best minor league prospect in the league by Baseball America following the 2002 season.

Gómez spent the entire 2003 season with the Omaha Royals of the Pacific Coast League in Triple-A baseball. He played 121 games, batting .270 for the season and leading the team with eight triples and 123 hits, with 8 and 123. In addition, he slammed eight homers and knocked in 58 RBI.

In 2004, Gómez played with Triple-A Omaha, where he batted a poor .251 for the season and only racked up 96 hits in 109 games. He had another stint with the Kansas City Royals at the end of the season backing up center fielder David DeJesus. In 13 games, Gómez went 8-for-29, also picking up his first major league RBI and runs scored.

The Royals then dropped Gómez from their roster, and he was subsequently picked up by the Detroit Tigers at the end of the season.

== Detroit Tigers ==
In 2005, Gómez was sent to the International League where he played Triple-A baseball for the Toledo Mud Hens. He performed exceptionally well, getting 130 hits in 114 games and maintaining a solid .307 batting average. He made another brief appearance in the majors with the Tigers by playing in nine games and going 3-for-16 (.188).

In 2006, Gómez played 62 games for Detroit. He started with the team in April and was briefly sent back down to Toledo in early May, where he went 24-for-102, batting .235 in 28 games of limited action. However, he again played with the Tigers on June 6 and stayed until on July 26, when he was designated for assignment.

On August 7, 2006, Gómez belted four home runs in a game for the Mud Hens. He then was a surprise addition to the Tigers lineup in Game 2 of the 2006 American League Championship Series, and he responded by going 2-for-4 with a two-run single and a two-run home run to help lead the Tigers to an 8–5 victory over the Oakland Athletics. He was reacquired by the Tigers in 2009.

== Back to the minors ==
In 2007, Gómez played in the Colorado Rockies organization. On January 4, 2008, he signed a minor league contract with the Florida Marlins with an invitation to spring training. He missed a huge chunk of the season while on the disabled list and became a free agent at the end of the season.

== 2009 ==
On January 6, 2009, Gómez signed a minor league contract with an invitation to spring training with the Tigers.

== 2010 ==
In 2010 Alexis Gomez signed with the Vaqueros Laguna club of the Mexican League, where he hit .352 with 16 home runs and 82 RBIs, while leading the league with 37 stolen bases. At the end of the season, Gómez he was traded to the Diablos Rojos del México. In November 2010, he was involved in a traffic accident, in which he lost control of the SUV he was driving hit and killed a pedestrian. Gómez was rushed to a hospital.

In 2015, Gómez was named co-hitting coach along with Buck Coats for Los Angeles Angels rookie minor league rookie team Orem Owlz.

In 2025, Gómez was named manager of the Dominican Republic national baseball team at the 2025 Copa América, under general manager Luis Polonia.
