= Magglio Ordóñez =

Venezuelan baseball player (born 1974)

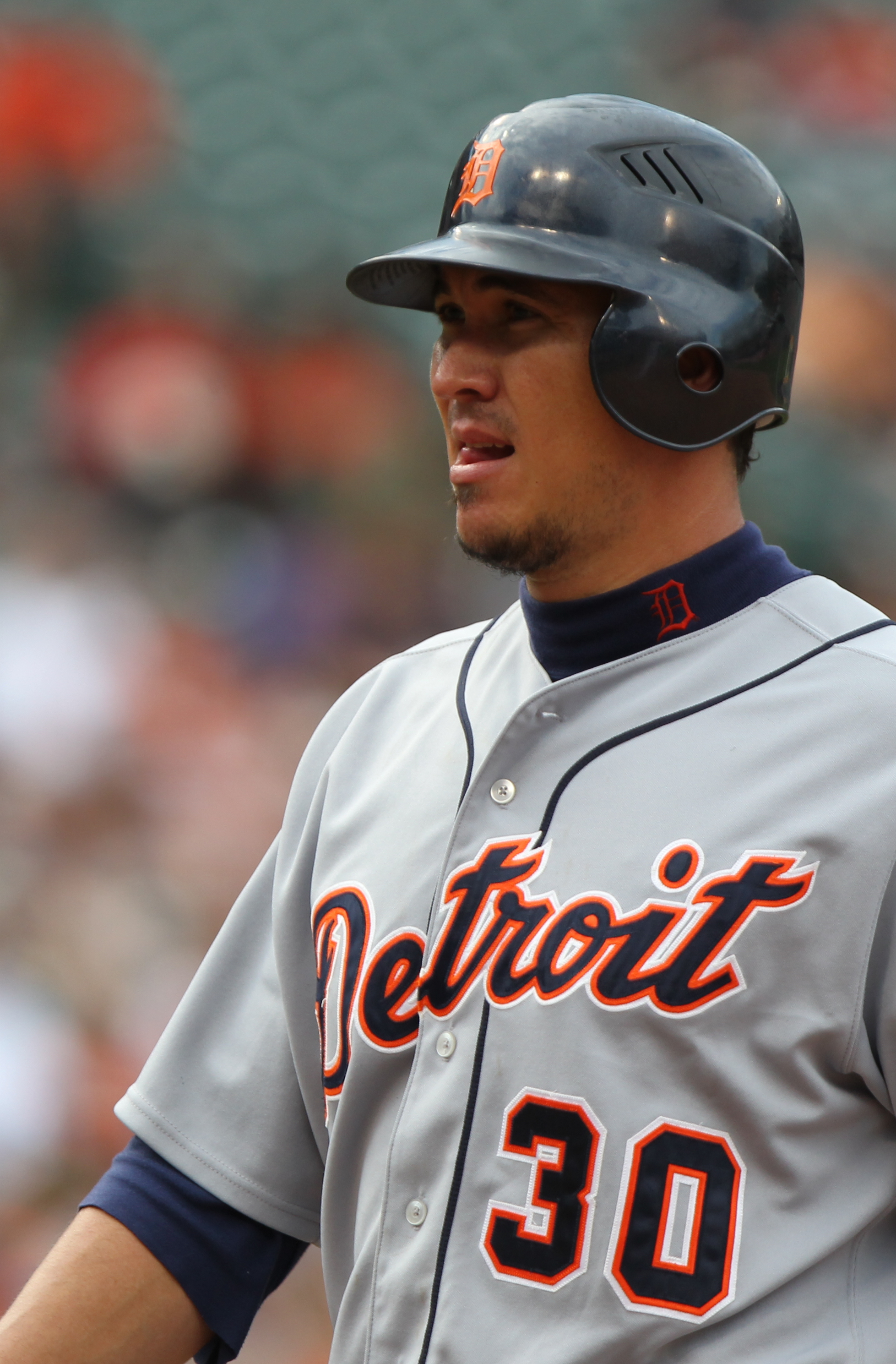
- Ordóñez with the Tigers in 2011
- Right fielder
- Born: January 28, 1974 (age 52); Caracas, Venezuela
- Batted: Right Threw: Right

MLB debut
- August 29, 1997, for the Chicago White Sox

Last MLB appearance
- September 27, 2011, for the Detroit Tigers

MLB statistics
- Batting average: .309
- Hits: 2,156
- Home runs: 294
- Runs batted in: 1,236
- Stats at Baseball Reference

Teams
- Chicago White Sox (1997–2004); Detroit Tigers (2005–2011)

Career highlights and awards
- 6× All-Star (1999–2001, 2003, 2006, 2007); 3× Silver Slugger Award (2000, 2002, 2007); AL batting champion (2007)

Magglio José Ordóñez Delgado (/ɔːrˈdoʊnjɛz/; born January 28, 1974) is a Venezuelan former professional baseball right fielder. He played for the Chicago White Sox (1997–2004) and Detroit Tigers (2005–2011). Ordóñez is 5 feet 11 inches (1.80 m) tall and weighs 215 lb (98 kg). Having posted a career .309 batting average over 15 seasons, Ordóñez retired from the major leagues as a Tiger on June 3, 2012, in a ceremony at Comerica Park prior to the afternoon game.

In 2013, he announced that he would be running for public office in his native country of Venezuela and was elected mayor of the Juan Antonio Sotillo Municipality on December 8, 2013.

== Professional career ==
In a 15-year major league career (through the end of the 2011 season), Ordóñez was a .309 hitter with 294 home runs and 1,236 RBIs in 1,848 games. Other career totals include 1,076 runs scored, 426 doubles, .369 on-base percentage and .502 slugging percentage. He was selected for the All-Star Game six times (1999–2001, 2003, and 2006–07) and won three Silver Slugger awards (2000, 2002, and 2007). In 2007, he won the American League batting title with an average of .363. He also established a career high with 139 runs batted in, and finished runner-up to Alex Rodriguez in the AL Most Valuable Player award voting.

=== Chicago White Sox (1997–2004) ===
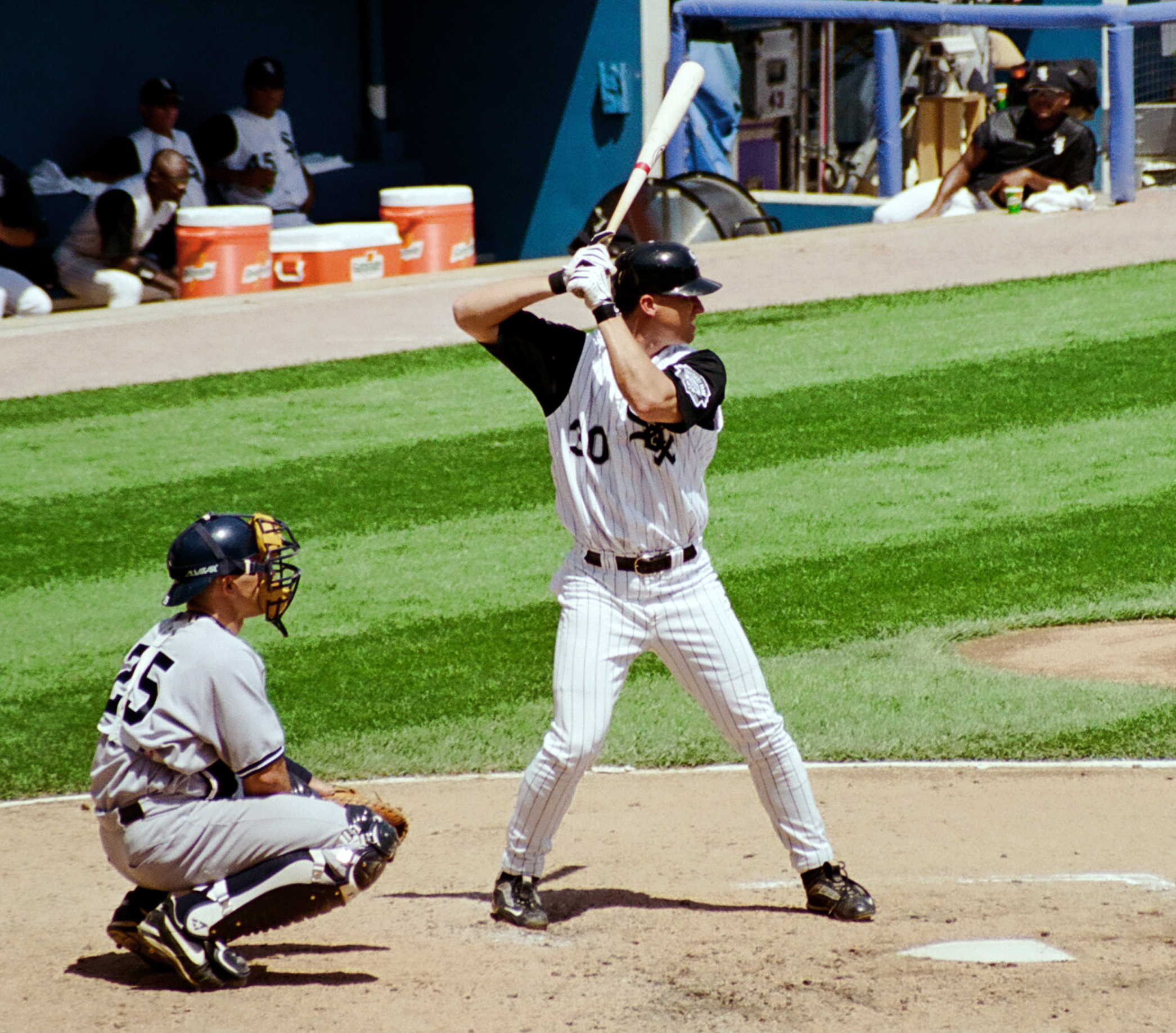
Ordóñez bats for the White Sox, 1999

Ordóñez spent the first eight years of his major league career playing with the Chicago White Sox. In the five seasons prior to 2004, Ordóñez hit at least .300 with 29 home runs and 99 RBI, and reached the 30-home run, 100-RBI plateau in four of those seasons. He also collected over 70 extra-base hits from 2001 to 2003, but a collision with second baseman Willie Harris on Omar Vizquel's popup to right field during a May 19, 2004, game against the Cleveland Indians, cost him two trips to the disabled list and two surgeries on his left knee. He finished with .292, 9 home runs, and 37 RBI in 52 games. During the 2001 season when Ordóñez was teammates with Jose Canseco, Canseco claims he injected Ordóñez with steroids.

During the 2003 off-season, Ordonez was almost traded to the Boston Red Sox. The Red Sox and Texas Rangers had been in discussions for weeks about Boston acquiring the reigning American League MVP, SS Alex Rodriguez for outfielder Manny Ramirez. The Red Sox then agreed in principle to trade its incumbent SS Nomar Garciaparra to the White Sox for Ordonez. When the Rodriguez-for-Ramirez trade fell through, the Red Sox decided to not trade Garciaparra and the Ordonez trade was called off as well.

=== Detroit Tigers (2005–2011) ===
Ordóñez signed with the Detroit Tigers as a free agent on February 7, 2005. His five-year, $85 million contract was the second largest the Tigers had ever paid a player. Because of Ordóñez's knee injury from the 2004 season, the contract included a clause stating that if he were to spend more than 25 days on the disabled list due to the same injury, the contract could be bought out for $3 million at the discretion of the Tigers' management.

After he signed with Detroit, Ordóñez had a public dispute with Ozzie Guillén, his former manager and teammate in Chicago. Their apparent mutual dislike for each other was a contributing factor to Ordóñez's departure from the White Sox. However, the rivalry appears to have cooled, as Guillén actually requested Ordóñez for the 2006 All-Star Game.

In 2005, Ordóñez's first season for Detroit, he strained an abdominal muscle during the first week of the season and spent the next three months on the disabled list, as the strain turned out to be a hernia. This caused him to rest after corrective surgery for two months following the injury, after which he began a rehabilitation assignment at the Tigers' AAA minor league team in Toledo. He returned to the Tigers' lineup in early July, and once again became a star by hitting consistently over .300 while batting clean-up.

In 2006, Ordóñez returned to All-Star form. He was selected to the 2006 All-Star Game as an injury replacement for Red Sox left fielder Manny Ramírez. At the All-Star break, Ordóñez was hitting .312 with 16 home runs and 62 RBI, and was a mainstay for a Tigers team that was a major-league best 59–29 at the break.

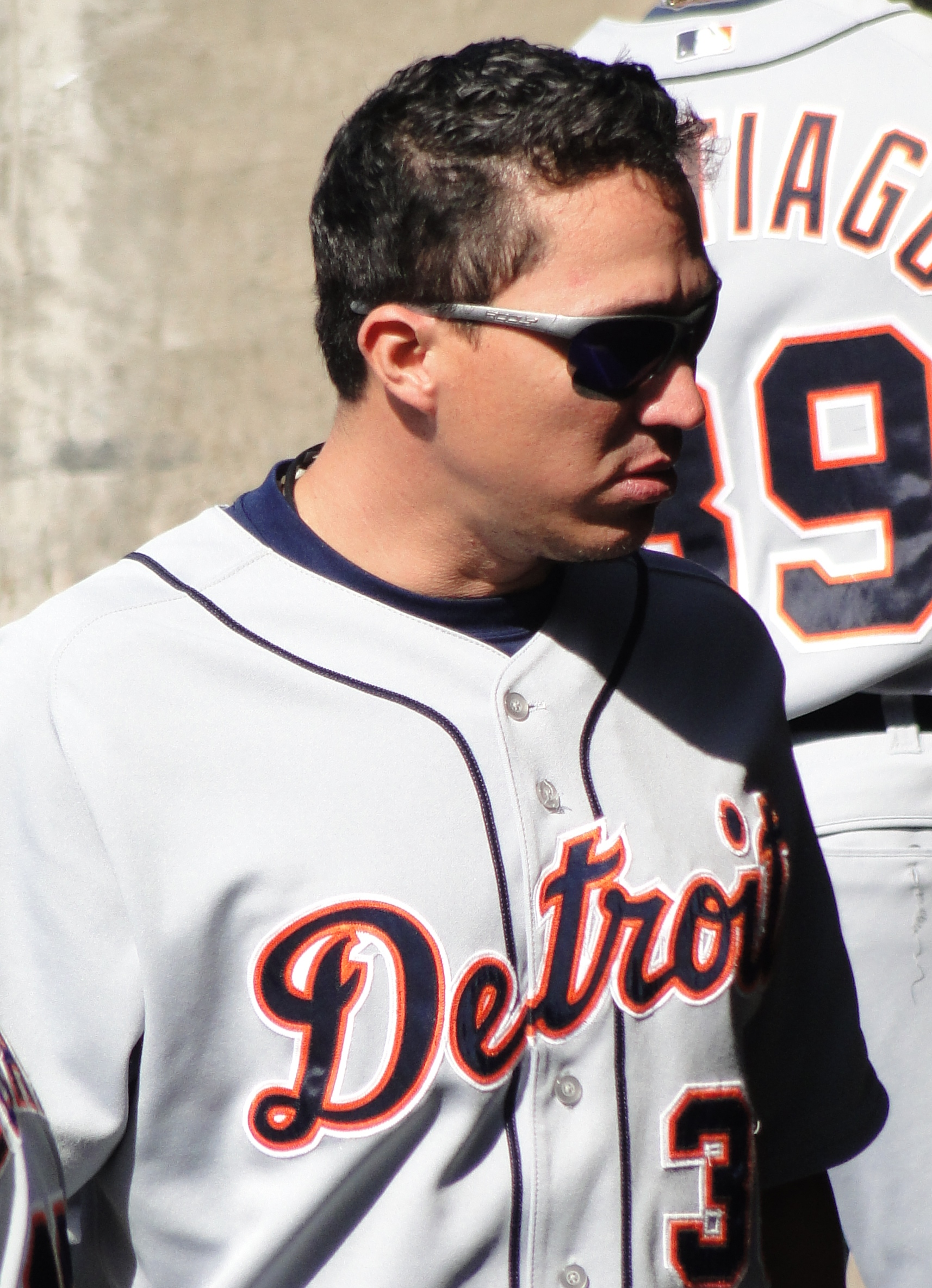
Ordóñez in May 2010

On October 14, 2006, Ordóñez completed the Tigers' sweep of the ALCS with a three-run homer against Huston Street of the Oakland Athletics, with two outs on a 1–0 count in the bottom of the 9th, the 8th time in MLB history that a post-season series has ended with a home run. The win sent the Tigers to their first World Series appearance since 1984. Coincidentally, it also happened 22 years to the day from when the Tigers won the World Series in that year.

Ordóñez had the best season of his career in 2007, finishing second in the American League MVP race behind Alex Rodriguez. His .363 batting average, 28 home runs and 139 RBIs could be considered one of the best seasons ever by a Detroit Tigers outfielder. Magglio's records and accomplishments in 2007 include:

- His .363 batting average was the highest in Major League Baseball. He finished the season as the AL batting champion, and was the first Tiger player to accomplish the feat since Norm Cash in 1961. The last Tiger to hit for a higher average was Charlie Gehringer in 1937 (.371).
- His 54 doubles was the most in Major League Baseball. It was the most by a Tiger since George Kell hit 56 in 1950.
- His 139 RBIs was the highest by a Tiger since Rocky Colavito had 140 in 1961. Colavito is the only Tiger batter with more RBIs than Ordóñez in the past 60 years.
- On August 12, 2007, Ordóñez hit two home runs in an eight-run second-inning of an 11–6 win over the Oakland Athletics, becoming the second batter in Tigers' history to achieve this feat; Al Kaline had done so on April 17, 1955, in a 16–0 win over the then-Kansas City Athletics.
- Ordóñez had an on-base percentage of .434; only two other Tiger batters in the past 60 years have posted a higher on-base percentage: Tony Phillips in 1993 (.443) and Norm Cash in 1961 (.487).
- Only one Tiger in the past 60 years has had a higher slugging percentage than Magglio's .595: Norm Cash in 1961 had a slugging percentage of .662.

On April 29, 2010, Ordóñez got his 2000th career hit against the Minnesota Twins' Carl Pavano. On July 24 Ordóñez hurt his ankle sliding into home. X-rays revealed a fracture that was expected to heal in six to eight weeks, but some weeks after the injury it was reported Magglio would miss the rest of the season. Following the season, the Tigers declined Ordóñez's $15 million option for 2011.

On December 16, 2010, the Tigers re-signed Ordóñez to a 1-year, $10 million contract.

On October 8, 2011, during a playoff game with the Texas Rangers, Ordóñez re-fractured the ankle that he had fractured in 2010, he was then ruled out for the rest of the 2011 postseason.

On November 1, 2011, Tigers general manager David Dombrowski announced that the Tigers would "most likely" not offer Ordóñez a contract for the 2012 season, which makes Ordóñez a free agent. On May 29, 2012, it was reported that Ordonez would announce his retirement within the week.

On June 3, 2012, Ordóñez officially retired from Major League Baseball in a ceremony at Comerica Park.

In 2013, Ordóñez became co-owner of the Venezuelan professional baseball team Caribes de Anzoátegui, a team he briefly played for before coming to the United States.

== Nicknames and family ==
In Detroit's Comerica Park some Tiger fans sported curly black wigs underneath their baseball caps until mid-2009, when Ordóñez cut his hair short. He is also sometimes referred to affectionately as "Maggs". In mid-2006, a group of bloggers began referring to Magglio as "The Big Tilde". This nickname has been referenced on Deadspin, MLB.com, and during a Fox Sports broadcast.

Ordóñez has three children with his wife Dagly, a son named Magglio Jr. and two daughters, Maggliana and Sophia.

Ordóñez' son, Magglio Ordóñez Jr. was drafted by the Detroit Tigers in the 2014 Major League Baseball draft.

== Political views ==
Ordóñez was a supporter of the late Venezuelan President Hugo Chávez, and in early 2009 appeared in a televised political ad which assured the Venezuelan people that "the best of the revolution and socialism is yet to come." He also joined Chávez on the campaign trail. As a result, during the 2009 World Baseball Classic, Ordóñez was booed by anti-Chávez Venezuelan fans, during his at bats, and while he was on the field.

In August 2013, Ordóñez announced that he would run for the office of mayor in the Juan Antonio Sotillo Municipality in Venezuela, on the ticket of the late Chavez's United Socialist Party of Venezuela. It was announced on December 9, 2013, that he had been elected Mayor. Ordóñez was mayor from 2013 to 2017.

== See also ==
- List of Major League Baseball batting champions
- List of Major League Baseball annual doubles leaders
- List of Major League Baseball career home run leaders
- List of Major League Baseball career runs batted in leaders
- List of Major League Baseball career doubles leaders
- List of Major League Baseball career hits leaders
- List of Major League Baseball players from Venezuela
- List of Major League Baseball career runs scored leaders

Awards and achievements
Preceded by Jason Giambi; Hideki Matsui	American League Player of the Month; July 2003; August 2007	Succeeded by Alex Rodriguez; David Ortiz
