= Craig Monroe =

American baseball player and analyst (born 1977)

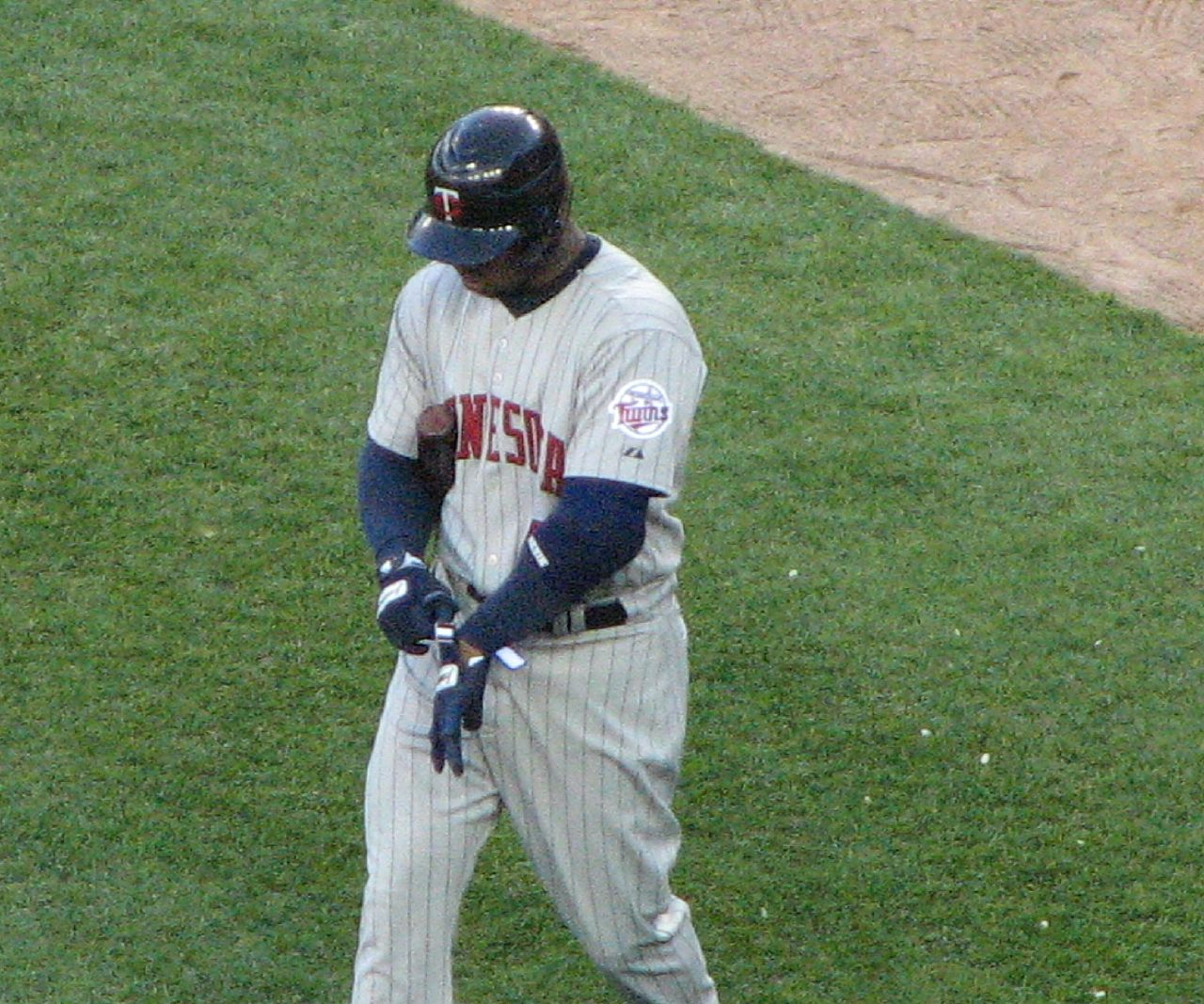
- Monroe with the Minnesota Twins in 2008
- Outfielder
- Born: February 27, 1977 (age 49); Texarkana, Texas, U.S.
- Batted: Right Threw: Right

MLB debut
- July 28, 2001, for the Texas Rangers

Last MLB appearance
- June 16, 2009, for the Pittsburgh Pirates

MLB statistics
- Batting average: .252
- Home runs: 115
- Runs batted in: 433
- Stats at Baseball Reference

Teams
- Texas Rangers (2001); Detroit Tigers (2002–2007); Chicago Cubs (2007); Minnesota Twins (2008); Pittsburgh Pirates (2009)

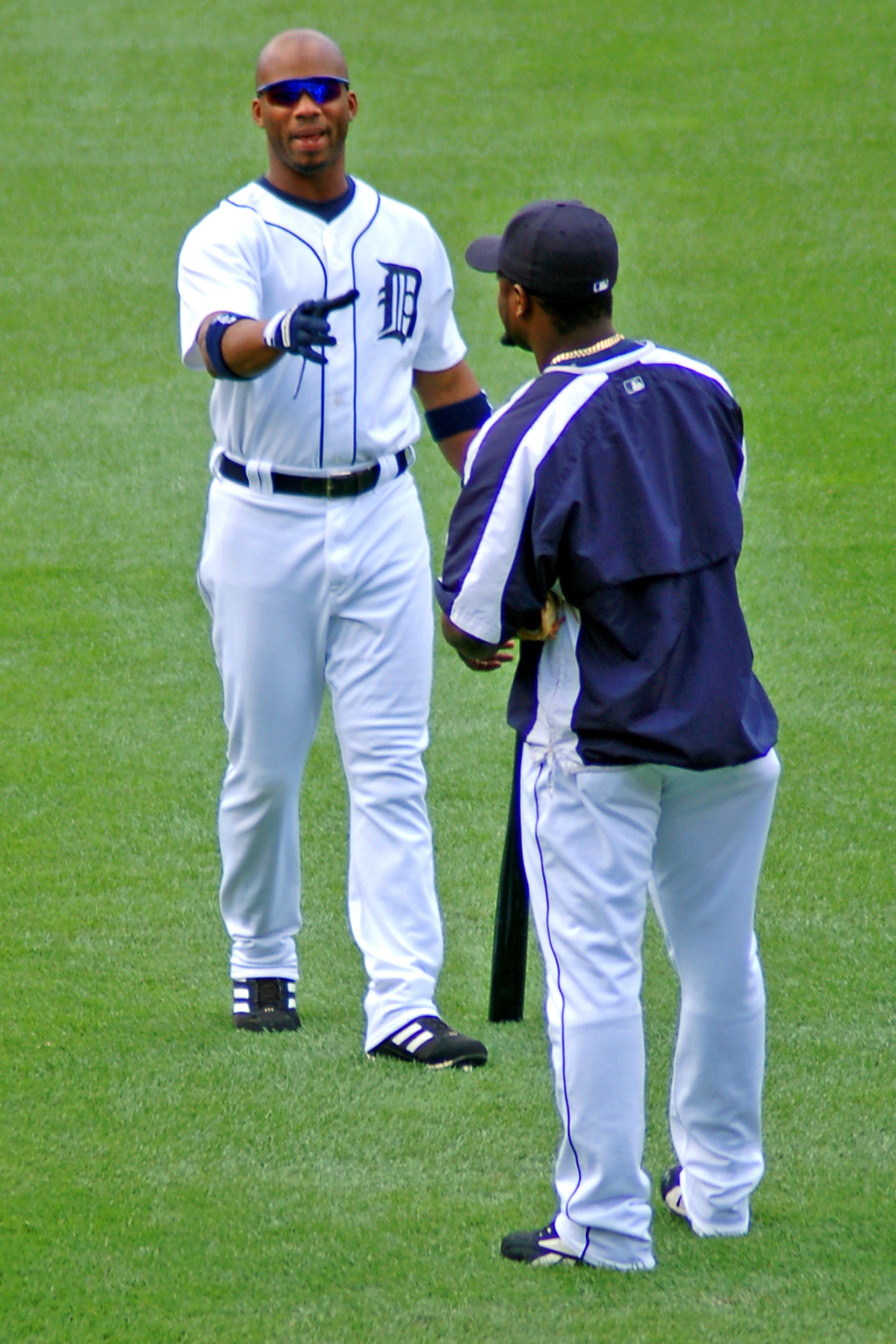
Monroe (left) talks to teammate Fernando Rodney in 2006.

Craig Keystone Monroe (nicknamed "C. Mo") (born February 27, 1977) is an American former Major League Baseball (MLB) outfielder and current sportscaster. He played for the Texas Rangers, Detroit Tigers, Chicago Cubs, Minnesota Twins and Pittsburgh Pirates.

== Professional career ==
Monroe was selected by the Texas Rangers in the eighth round (206th overall) of the 1995 Major League Baseball draft. He made his major league debut on July 28, 2001, against the Tampa Bay Devil Rays, going 0-for-3 as the Rangers lost 7–3. The next day, Monroe hit first major league home run off Devil Rays pitcher Joe Kennedy in a 2–0 victory for the Rangers. He appeared in 27 games for the Rangers in 2001, batting .212 with two home runs and 5 RBI.

On February 1, 2002, Monroe was claimed off waivers by the Detroit Tigers organization. He played in his first full major league season in 2003, batting .240 with 23 home runs and 70 RBI in 128 games.

On July 19, 2006, Monroe hit a grand slam home run off Javier Vázquez of the Chicago White Sox which was decisive in the Tigers 5–2 win. At the time, the teams were locked in a struggle for the American League Central division lead. Monroe called it "by far the biggest one I've ever hit." Monroe finished the 2006 season batting .255 with a team-leading 28 home runs and 92 RBI in 147 games. His 92 RBI and 35 doubles also ranked second on team. The Tigers turned around more than a decade of losing with 95 wins, and made the postseason. He also hit five home runs in the 2006 postseason, which culminated in a World Series appearance. His five postseason home runs tied a Tigers single-postseason franchise record, while his 28 home runs and 92 RBI both established career highs.

Monroe played in 99 games with the Tigers in 2007, batting .222 with 11 home runs and 55 RBI. On August 17, 2007, the Tigers designated Monroe for assignment. On August 23, he was traded to the Chicago Cubs for a player to be named later. Monroe played with the Cubs for the remainder of the 2007 season. The Tigers received Clay Rapada to complete the trade on August 30. On November 13, Monroe was traded to the Minnesota Twins for a player to be named later. On August 1, 2008, Monroe was designated for assignment by the Twins, and released on August 8.

Monroe signed a minor league deal with the Pittsburgh Pirates on January 13, 2009. Monroe was added to the Major League roster at the end of spring training. Monroe was designated for assignment on June 20 to make room on the roster for Steve Pearce. Monroe was released on July 1, after which he retired as an active player.

== Retirement activities ==
Monroe became a studio analyst for the Detroit Tigers on Bally Sports Detroit in 2012 and started serving as an occasional color analyst on game broadcasts. In 2022, Monroe could be heard on the Detroit Tigers Radio Network as a color commentator alongside play-by-play announcer Dan Dickerson on select road games. Monroe was promoted to the primary analyst for Tigers game broadcasts on Bally Sports Detroit in 2023.

== Personal life ==
Monroe's mother's name is Marilyn Monroe, the same as that of the actress. She was on hand to watch her son hit a go-ahead home run against the New York Yankees at Yankee Stadium on August 30, 2006. After the game, he told the media, "Marilyn Monroe is here in New York, and I'm thrilled." Monroe and his wife, Kasey, have three children.

On July 1, 2024, Bally Sports Detroit and Tigers radio indefinitely suspended Monroe after it was announced he is being investigated for sex crimes in Charlotte County, Florida against a now 35-year-old woman starting when she was 12.
