= 2006 Seattle Mariners season =

2006 Seattle Mariners
- League: American League
- Division: West
- Ballpark: Safeco Field
- City: Seattle, Washington
- Record: 78–84 (.481)
- Divisional place: 4th
- Owners: Nintendo of America (represented by Howard Lincoln)
- General manager: Bill Bavasi
- Manager: Mike Hargrove
- Television: KSTW 11; FSN Northwest (Dave Niehaus, Rick Rizzs, Ron Fairly, Dave Valle, Dave Henderson, Jay Buhner)
- Radio: KOMO 710 AM (Dave Niehaus, Rick Rizzs, Ron Fairly, Dave Valle, Dave Henderson, Jay Buhner)

The 2006 Seattle Mariners season was the 30th season in franchise history. The Mariners played their 7th full season (8th overall) at Safeco Field and their third consecutive season finishing at the bottom of the American League (AL) West, finishing with a 78–84 (.481) record.

Two players were featured in the All-Star Game: Ichiro Suzuki, making his sixth appearance in the All-Star Game, and José López, with his only appearance. Suzuki led the majors with 224 hits and 186 singles.

The Mariners' longest winning streak was five games, which they reached twice, between June 16–21 and June 24–29. Their longest losing streak was 11 games, from August 10–20.

== Offseason ==
- November 21, 2005: Catcher Kenji Johjima signed a three-year $16.5 million contract.
- December 7: Catcher Yorvit Torrealba traded by the Mariners to the Colorado Rockies for Marcos Carvajal.
- January 4, 2006: Carl Everett signed as a free agent.
- January 9: Cody Ransom signed as a free agent.
- March 30: Ransom's contract purchased by the Houston Astros.

== Regular season ==
=== Season standings ===
AL West
Team	W	L	Pct.	GB	Home	Road
Oakland Athletics	93	69	.574	—	49‍–‍32	44‍–‍37
Los Angeles Angels of Anaheim	89	73	.549	4	45‍–‍36	44‍–‍37
Texas Rangers	80	82	.494	13	39‍–‍42	41‍–‍40
Seattle Mariners	78	84	.481	15	44‍–‍37	34‍–‍47

=== Record vs. opponents ===
2006 American League record Source: MLB Standings Grid – 2006
Team	BAL	BOS	CWS	CLE	DET	KC	LAA	MIN	NYY	OAK	SEA	TB	TEX	TOR	NL
Baltimore	—	3–15	2–5	4–2	3–3	5–1	4–6	3–6	7–12	2–4	4–6	13–6	3–6	8–11	9–9
Boston	15–3	—	4–2	3–4	3–3	4–5	3–3	1–5	8–11	3–7	4–6	10–9	5–4	7–12	16–2
Chicago	5–2	2–4	—	8–11	12–7	11–8	6–3	9–10	2–4	3–3	5–4	3–3	5–5	5–4	14–4
Cleveland	2–4	4–3	11–8	—	6–13	10–8	4–5	8–11	3–4	3–6	4–5	6–1	5–4	4–2	8–10
Detroit	3–3	3–3	7–12	13–6	—	14–4	3–5	11–8	2–5	5–4	6–3	5–3	5–5	3–3	15–3
Kansas City	1–5	5–4	8–11	8–10	4–14	—	3–7	7–12	2–7	4–5	3–5	1–5	3–3	3–4	10–8
Los Angeles	6–4	3–3	3–6	5–4	5–3	7–3	—	4–2	6–4	11–8	10–9	7–2	11–8	4–6	7–11
Minnesota	6–3	5–1	10–9	11–8	8–11	12–7	2–4	—	3–3	6–4	5–3	6–1	4–5	2–5	16–2
New York	12–7	11–8	4–2	4–3	5–2	7–2	4–6	3–3	—	3–6	3–3	13–5	8–2	10–8	10–8
Oakland	4–2	7–3	3–3	6–3	4–5	5–4	8–11	4–6	6–3	—	17–2	6–3	9–10	6–4	8–10
Seattle	6–4	6–4	4–5	5–4	3–6	5–3	9–10	3–5	3–3	2–17	—	6–3	8–11	4–5	14–4
Tampa Bay	6–13	9–10	3–3	1–6	3–5	5–1	2–7	1–6	5–13	3–6	3–6	—	3–6	6–12	11–7
Texas	6–3	4–5	5–5	4–5	5–5	3–3	8–11	5–4	2–8	10–9	11–8	6–3	—	4–2	7–11
Toronto	11–8	12–7	4–5	2–4	3–3	4–3	6–4	5–2	8–10	4–6	5–4	12–6	2–4	—	9–9

=== Notable transactions ===
- July 26: Ben Broussard traded by the Cleveland Indians with cash to the Mariners for Shin-Soo Choo and a player to be named later. The Mariners sent Shawn Nottingham on August 24 to Cleveland to complete the trade.Carl Everett released.
- August 19: Jamie Moyer traded by the Mariners to the Philadelphia Phillies for minor leaguers Andrew Baldwin and Andy Barb.
- September 14: Bench coach Ron Hassey and administrative coach Dan Rohn removed from their positions. Hassey left the team after being told he would not have a job the following year, while Rohn was immediately let go.

=== Roster ===
2006 Seattle Mariners
Roster
Pitchers: 58 Cha Seung Baek; 66 Jorge Campillo; 64 Travis Chick; 31 Francisco Cruceta; 63 Ryan Feierabend; 53 Emiliano Fruto; 54 Sean Green; 18 Eddie Guardado; 58 Jeff Harris; 34 Félix Hernández; 60 Jon Huber; 62 César Jiménez; 35 Bobby Livingston; 57 Mark Lowe; 40 Julio Mateo; 55 Gil Meche; 50 Jamie Moyer; 37 Clint Nageotte; 59 Eric O'Flaherty; 38 Joel Piñeiro; 20 J. J. Putz; 52 George Sherrill; 39 Rafael Soriano; 56 Jarrod Washburn; 49 Jake Woods	Catchers: 2 Kenji Johjima; 26 Guillermo Quiróz; 30 René Rivera; Infielders: 29 Adrián Beltré; 3 Yuniesky Betancourt; 23 Ben Broussard; 22 Greg Dobbs; 4 José López; 61 Oswaldo Navarro; 33 Eduardo Pérez; 23 Roberto Petagine; 44 Richie Sexson	Outfielders: 16 Willie Bloomquist; 17 T. J. Bohn; 17 Joe Borchard; 17 Shin-Soo Choo; 8 Carl Everett; 28 Raúl Ibañez; 25 Adam Jones; 15 Matt Lawton; 12 Mike Morse; 7 Jeremy Reed; 32 Chris Snelling; 51 Ichiro Suzuki	Manager: 21 Mike Hargrove; Coaches: 43 Rafael Chaves (pitching); 13 Carlos García (third base); 47 Mike Goff (first base); 9 Ron Hassey (bench); 45 Jeff Pentland (hitting); 41 Jim Slaton (bullpen)

=== Major league debuts ===
==== Batters ====
- Kenji Johjima (April 3)
- Adam Jones (July 14)
- T. J. Bohn (August 22)
- Oswaldo Navarro (September 9)

==== Pitchers ====
- Bobby Livingston (April 25)
- Sean Green (May 2)
- Emiliano Fruto (May 14)
- Mark Lowe (July 7)
- Eric O'Flaherty (August 16)
- Jon Huber (August 30)
- César Jiménez (September 11)
- Travis Chick and Ryan Feierabend (September 13)

== Game log ==
2006 game log
April

#	Date	Opponent	Score	Win	Loss	Save	Attendance	Record
1	April 3	Angels	5–4	Shields (1–0)	Sherrill (0–1)	Rodríguez (1)	45,515	0–1
2	April 4	Angels	10–8	Piñeiro (1–0)	Lackey (0–1)		20,051	1–1
3	April 5	Angels	6–4	Washburn (1–0)	Weaver (0–1)	Sherrill (1)	21,394	2–1
4	April 6	Athletics	6–2	Meche (1–0)	Loaiza (0–1)	Putz (1)	22,701	3–1
5	April 7	Athletics	5–0	Blanton (1–0)	Hernández (0–1)		30,612	3–2
6	April 8	Athletics	3–0	Zito (1–1)	Moyer (0–1)	Street (1)	37,904	3–3
7	April 9	Athletics	6–4	Harden (1–0)	Piñeiro (1–1)	Street (2)	27,139	3–4
8	April 11	@ Indians	9–5	Lee (1–0)	Washburn (1–1)		17,559	3–5
9	April 12	@ Indians	11–9	Woods (1–0)	Byrd (1–1)	Guardado (1)	14,773	4–5
10	April 13	@ Indians	9–5	Mateo (1–0)	Sauerbeck (0–1)	Putz (2)	24,638	5–5
11	April 14	@ Red Sox	2–1	Schilling (3–0)	Moyer (0–2)	Papelbon (5)	36,431	5–6
12	April 15	@ Red Sox	3–0	Piñeiro (2–1)	Wakefield (1–2)	Guardado (2)	36,047	6–6
13	April 16	@ Red Sox	3–2	Beckett (3–0)	Washburn (1–2)	Papelbon (6)	36,181	6–7
14	April 17	@ Red Sox	7–6	Timlin (1–0)	Guardado (0–1)		36,188	6–8
15	April 18	Rangers	7–4	Koronka (2–1)	Hernández (0–2)	Cordero (2)	17,927	6–9
16	April 19	Rangers	9–6	Putz (1–0)	Cordero (1–2)		17,613	7–9
17	April 20	Rangers	4–3	Bauer (1–0)	Guardado (0–2)	Cordero (3)	17,917	7–10
18	April 21	Tigers	2–1	Maroth (3–0)	Washburn (1–3)	Jones (1)	35,237	7–11
19	April 22	Tigers	2–0	Robertson (2–2)	Meche (1–1)	Rodney (4)	27,893	7–12
20	April 23	Tigers	6–4	Verlander (2–2)	Hernández (0–3)	Jones (2)	28,659	7–13
21	April 24	White Sox	4–3	Mateo (2–0)	McCarthy (1–1)		20,390	8–13
22	April 25	White Sox	13–3	Vázquez (2–1)	Piñeiro (2–2)	Logan (1)	20,451	8–14
23	April 26	White Sox	5–1	Washburn (2–3)	Buehrle (3–1)		23,848	9–14
24	April 28	@ Orioles	5–2	Cabrera (2–2)	Meche (1–2)	Ray (7)	26,934	9–15
25	April 29	@ Orioles	8–6	Hernández (1–3)	Brower (0–1)	Guardado (3)	34,161	10–15
26	April 30	@ Orioles	4–3	Moyer (1–2)	López (1–3)	Guardado (4)	32,421	11–15

May

#	Date	Opponent	Score	Win	Loss	Save	Attendance	Record
27	May 1	@ Twins	8–2	Piñeiro (3–2)	Baker (1–3)		11,796	12–15
28	May 2	@ Twins	5–1	Santana (2–3)	Washburn (2–4)		14,513	12–16
29	May 3	@ White Sox	6–5	Jenks (1–0)	Woods (1–1)		27,569	12–17
30	May 4	@ White Sox	4–1	Contreras (5–0)	Hernández (1–4)	Jenks (9)	26,313	12–18
31	May 5	Indians	9–4	Westbrook (3–2)	Soriano (0–1)		32,998	12–19
32	May 6	Indians	4–1	Piñeiro (4–2)	Lee (2–3)	Putz (3)	28,672	13–19
33	May 7	Indians	2–0	Sabathia (2–0)	Washburn (2–5)	Wickman (6)	35,562	13–20
34	May 8	Devil Rays	6–3	Meche (2–2)	Orvella (1–4)	Putz (4)	16,102	14–20
35	May 9	Devil Rays	8–1	Hernández (2–4)	Waechter (0–2)	Soriano (1)	19,726	15–20
36	May 10	Devil Rays	1–0	Kazmir (5–2)	Moyer (1–3)	Walker (4)	21,801	15–21
37	May 12	@ Angels	12–7	Escobar (5–2)	Piñeiro (4–3)	Carrasco (1)	43,912	15–22
38	May 13	@ Angels	5–4	Sherrill (1–1)	Gregg (2–2)	Woods (1)	43,821	16–22
39	May 14	@ Angels	9–4	Meche (3–2)	Weaver (1–6)	Fruto (1)	43,191	17–22
40	May 16	@ Athletics	12–6	Blanton (4–4)	Hernández (2–5)		16,397	17–23
41	May 17	@ Athletics	7–2	Zito (3–3)	Moyer (1–4)		19,208	17–24
42	May 18	@ Athletics	6–3	Saarloos (2–1)	Piñeiro (4–4)	Street (6)	16,397	17–25
43	May 19	Padres	7–4	Soriano (1–1)	Cassidy (3–2)		35,338	18–25
44	May 20	Padres	6–3	Meche (4–2)	Hensley (2–3)	Putz (5)	33,946	19–25
45	May 21	Padres	10–8	Hernández (3–5)	Park (2–2)	Putz (6)	37,132	20–25
46	May 22	Orioles	8–6	Moyer (2–4)	Bédard (5–3)	Guardado (5)	18,819	21–25
47	May 23	Orioles	14–4	Halama (3–1)	Piñeiro (4–5)	Ray (11)	19,435	21–26
48	May 24	Orioles	7–4	Washburn (3–5)	Benson (6–4)	Putz (7)	21,991	22–26
49	May 25	Orioles	2–0	López (2–7)	Meche (4–3)	Ray (12)	23,806	22–27
50	May 26	@ Twins	3–1	Liriano (3–0)	Hernández (3–6)	Nathan (6)	28,082	22–28
51	May 27	@ Twins	9–5	Bonser (1–0)	Moyer (2–5)	Rincón (1)	25,305	22–29
52	May 28	@ Twins	4–3	Nathan (3–0)	Guardado (0–3)		24,388	22–30
53	May 29	@ Rangers	2–0	Rheinecker (1–0)	Washburn (3–6)	Bauer (1)	23,771	22–31
54	May 30	@ Rangers	6–4	Millwood (6–3)	Meche (4–4)	Otsuka (9)	18,084	22–32
55	May 31	@ Rangers	14–5	Hernández (4–6)	Koronka (4–3)		19,131	23–32

June

#	Date	Opponent	Score	Win	Loss	Save	Attendance	Record
56	June 2	Royals	4–0	Moyer (3–5)	Keppel (0–1)		28,382	24–32
57	June 3	Royals	12–1	Piñeiro (5–5)	Etherton (1–1)		29,659	25–32
58	June 4	Royals	9–4	Redman (1–4)	Washburn (3–7)	Dessens (1)	28,886	25–33
59	June 5	Royals	4–1	Meche (5–4)	Wood (3–1)	Putz (8)	18,409	26–33
60	June 6	Twins	4–2	Hernández (5–6)	Liriano (4–1)	Putz (9)	21,028	27–33
61	June 7	Twins	10–9	Mateo (3–0)	Crain (0–4)		24,785	28–33
62	June 8	Twins	7–3	Santana (6–4)	Piñeiro (5–6)		27,341	28–34
63	June 9	@ Angels	4–1	Washburn (4–7)	Escobar (5–7)	Putz (10)	44,114	29–34
64	June 10	@ Angels	12–6	Meche (6–4)	Lackey (4–4)		44,129	30–34
65	June 11	@ Angels	6–2	Hernández (6–6)	Weaver (3–9)		42,198	31–34
66	June 13	@ Athletics	2–0	Blanton (6–6)	Moyer (3–6)	Street (15)	15,216	31–35
67	June 14	@ Athletics	7–2	Haren (6–5)	Piñeiro (5–7)		20,550	31–36
68	June 15	@ Athletics	9–6	Loaiza (2–3)	Washburn (4–8)	Street (16)	16,563	31–37
69	June 16	Giants	5–4	Hernández (7–6)	Lowry (2–5)	Putz (11)	41,133	32–37
70	June 17	Giants	8–1	Meche (7–4)	Schmidt (6–3)		45,229	33–37
71	June 18	Giants	5–1	Moyer (4–6)	Wright (5–7)		45,216	34–37
72	June 20	@ Dodgers	9–4	Piñeiro (6–7)	Penny (7–2)	Soriano (2)	43,949	35–37
73	June 21	@ Dodgers	8–5	Mateo (4–0)	Báez (4–4)	Putz (12)	40,419	36–37
74	June 22	@ Dodgers	4–2	Lowe (6–3)	Hernández (7–7)		46,207	36–38
75	June 23	@ Padres	2–1	Linebrink (5–2)	Mateo (4–1)		40,049	36–39
75	June 24	@ Padres	9–5	Moyer (5–6)	Park (5–4)		33,349	37–39
77	June 25	@ Padres	9–4	Sherrill (2–1)	Embree (2–1)		32,707	38–39
78	June 27	@ D-backs	11–7	Woods (2–1)	Lyon (1–2)	Putz (13)	25,068	39–39
79	June 28	@ D-backs	11–3	Hernández (8–7)	González (0–2)		19,723	40–39
80	June 29	@ D-backs	3–2	Guardado (1–3)	Julio (1–3)	Putz (14)	20,649	41–39
81	June 30	Rockies	2–0	Fogg (6–5)	Moyer (5–7)		31,612	41–40

July

#	Date	Opponent	Score	Win	Loss	Save	Attendance	Record
82	July 1	Rockies	8–7	Mateo (5–1)	Cortés (3–1)	Putz (15)	33,638	42–40
83	July 2	Rockies	4–3	Fuentes (2–1)	Mateo (5–2)	King (1)	31,709	42–41
84	July 3	Angels	7–1	Weaver (5–0)	Hernández (8–8)		30,632	42–42
85	July 4	Angels	14–6	Santana (9–3)	Mateo (5–3)		30,853	42–43
86	July 5	Angels	4–0	Colón (1–4)	Moyer (5–8)		25,009	42–44
87	July 7	Tigers	6–1	Bonderman (8–4)	Piñeiro (6–8)		31,727	42–45
88	July 8	Tigers	2–1	Miner (6–1)	Washburn (4–9)	Jones (23)	32,404	42–46
89	July 9	Tigers	3–2	Meche (8–4)	Robertson (8–5)	Putz (16)	37,364	43–46
90	July 14	@ Blue Jays	5–3	Meche (9–4)	Janssen (6–8)	Putz (17)	23,443	44–46
91	July 15	@ Blue Jays	7–6	Downs (3–0)	Fruto (0–1)		36,069	44–47
92	July 16	@ Blue Jays	4–3	Downs (4–0)	Sherrill (2–2)		28,679	44–48
93	July 17	@ Yankees	4–2	Wang (10–4)	Washburn (4–10)	Rivera (22)	53,444	44–49
94	July 18	@ Yankees	5–4	Proctor (3–2)	Mateo (5–4)		52,992	44–50
95	July 19	@ Yankees	3–2	Lowe (1–0)	Johnson (10–8)	Putz (18)	54,121	45–50
96	July 21	Red Sox	9–4	Snyder (2–1)	Moyer (5–9)		46,325	45–51
97	July 22	Red Sox	5–2	Hernández (9–8)	Gabbard (0–1)	Putz (19)	46,118	46–51
98	July 23	Red Sox	9–8	Putz (2–0)	Timlin (5–1)		45,975	47–51
99	July 24	Blue Jays	7–3	Piñeiro (7–8)	Janssen (6–10)		29,787	48–51
100	July 25	Blue Jays	12–3	Halladay (13–2)	Meche (9–5)		30,793	48–52
101	July 26	Blue Jays	7–4	Moyer (6–9)	Burnett (2–4)	Putz (20)	33,629	49–52
102	July 28	@ Indians	1–0	Sowers (3–3)	Hernández (9–9)		25,045	49–53
103	July 29	@ Indians	3–1	Washburn (5–10)	Westbrook (7–7)	Putz (21)	27,876	50–53
104	July 30	@ Indians	7–3	Woods (3–1)	Carmona (1–4)	Putz (22)	23,146	51–53
105	July 31	@ Orioles	10–5	Mateo (6–4)	Loewen (1–3)		16,620	52–53

August

#	Date	Opponent	Score	Win	Loss	Save	Attendance	Record
106	August 1	@ Orioles	2–0	López (8–11)	Moyer (6–10)	Ray (27)	20,226	52–54
107	August 2	@ Orioles	2–1	Hernández (10–9)	Bédard (12–7)	Putz (23)	17,682	53–54
108	August 4	Athletics	5–2	Zito (12–7)	Washburn (5–11)		44,277	53–55
109	August 5	Athletics	5–2	Haren (9–9)	Piñeiro (7–9)	Street (24)	40,115	53–56
110	August 6	Athletics	7–6	Blanton (12–9)	Meche (9–6)	Street (25)	37,437	53–57
111	August 7	Devil Rays	5–4	Mateo (7–4)	Corcoran (4–3)	Putz (24)	30,735	54–57
112	August 8	Devil Rays	5–1	Mateo (8–4)	Camp (4–1)		32,951	55–57
113	August 9	Devil Rays	2–0	Washburn (6–11)	Shields (4–6)	Putz (25)	39,856	56–57
114	August 10	@ Rangers	8–2	Eaton (2–2)	Piñeiro (7–10)		31,763	56–58
115	August 11	@ Rangers	14–7	Littleton (2–0)	Meche (9–7)		28,207	56–59
116	August 12	@ Rangers	5–4	Vólquez (1–1)	Moyer (6–11)	Ostuka (23)	35,784	56–60
117	August 13	@ Rangers	10–6	Millwood (11–8)	Hernández (10–10)		29,717	56–61
118	August 14	@ Athletics	5–4	Kennedy (3–0)	Soriano (1–2)	Duchscherer (3)	21,859	56–62
119	August 15	@ Athletics	11–2	Saarloos (5–6)	Piñeiro (7–11)		23,726	56–63
120	August 16	@ Athletics	4–0	Haren (11–9)	Meche (9–8)		34,077	56–64
121	August 17	@ Angels	5–2	Escobar (9–10)	Moyer (6–12)	Rodríguez (32)	43,813	56–65
122	August 18	@ Angels	3–0	Weaver (9–0)	Hernández (10–11)	Rodríguez (33)	44,072	56–66
123	August 19	@ Angels	9–7	Carrasco (4–3)	Washburn (6–12)	Rodríguez (34)	44,106	56–67
124	August 20	@ Angels	3–2	Donnelly (3–0)	Putz (2–1)		43,876	56–68
125	August 22	Yankees	6–5	Mateo (9–4)	Villone (3–2)		42,454	57–68
126	August 23	Yankees	9–2	Wang (15–5)	Hernández (10–12)		41,380	57–59
127	August 24	Yankees	4–2	Washburn (7–12)	Johnson (14–10)	Putz (26)	44,634	58–69
128	August 25	Red Sox	6–0	Woods (4–1)	Schilling (14–6)		40,817	59–69
129	August 26	Red Sox	4–3	Putz (3–1)	Timlin (5–4)		44,779	60–69
130	August 27	Red Sox	6–3	Baek (1–0)	Snyder (3–3)	Putz (27)	44,288	61–69
131	August 28	Angels	2–0	Hernández (11–12)	Escobar (9–12)		28,748	62–69
132	August 29	Angels	6–4	Washburn (8–12)	Weaver (9–2)	J. J. Putz (28)	29,059	63–69
133	August 30	Angels	5–3	Lackey (11–9)	Woods (4–2)	Rodríguez (37)	31,269	63–70

September

#	Date	Opponent	Score	Win	Loss	Save	Attendance	Record
134	September 1	@ Devil Rays	2–1	McClung (5–12)	Sherrill (2–3)		11,196	63–71
135	September 2	@ Devil Rays	4–3	Baek (2–0)	Howell (0–2)	Putz (29)	14,503	64–71
136	September 3	@ Devil Rays	7–6	Meadows (3–5)	Hernández (11–12)	McClung (4)	14,501	64–72
137	September 4	@ Tigers	6–2	Robertson (12–11)	Washburn (8–13)		32,948	64–73
138	September 5	@ Tigers	4–3	Piñeiro (8–11)	Miller (0–1)	Putz (30)	23,583	65–73
139	September 6	@ Tigers	5–4	Huber (1–0)	Zumaya (6–3)	Putz (31)	23,066	66–73
140	September 8	Rangers	7–2	Baek (3–0)	Millwood (14–10)	Piñeiro (1)	28,646	67–73
141	September 9	Rangers	3–2	Fruto (1–1)	Rheinecker (4–6)		33,454	68–73
142	September 10	Rangers	4–2	Wilson (2–2)	Huber (1–1)	Otsuka (32)	34,321	68–74
143	September 11	Blue Jays	6–2	Lilly (13–12)	Woods (4–3)		24,462	68–75
144	September 12	Blue Jays	4–2	Meche (10–8)	Marcum (2–4)	Putz (32)	26,144	69–75
145	September 13	Blue Jays	10–0	Burnett (8–7)	Baek (3–1)		26,225	69–76
146	September 14	@ Royals	10–8	Pérez (2–3)	Washburn (8–14)		8,839	69–77
147	September 15	@ Royals	11–8	Woods (5–3)	Braun (0–1)		16,412	70–77
148	September 16	@ Royals	7–4	Redman (10–9)	Piñeiro (8–12)	Nelson (8)	12,116	70–78
149	September 17	@ Royals	10–5	Meche (11–8)	Gobble (3–6)		9,817	71–78
150	September 18	@ Rangers	8–1	Millwod (16–10)	Hernández (11–14)		18,214	71–79
151	September 19	@ Rangers	9–7	Huber (2–1)	Wilson (2–1)	Putz (33)	18,551	72–79
152	September 20	@ Rangers	6–3	Baek (4–1)	Tejeda (4–4)	Putz (34)	26,006	73–79
153	September 21	@ White Sox	9–0	Woods (6–3)	Vázquez (11–10)		33,976	74–79
154	September 22	@ White Sox	11–6	Fruto (2–1)	Contreras (13–9)		37,557	75–79
155	September 23	@ White Sox	11–7	Haeger (1–1)	Piñeiro (8–13)		37,400	75–80
156	September 24	@ White Sox	12–7	García (16–9)	Feierabend (0–1)		37,518	75–81
157	September 25	Athletics	10–9	Putz (4–1)	Calero (3–2)		20,982	76–81
158	September 26	Athletics	12–3	Harden (4–0)	Jake Woods (6–4)		19,604	76–82
159	September 27	Athletics	7–6	Witasick (4–0)	Sherrill (2–4)	Street (37)	23,421	76–83
160	September 29	Rangers	6–5	Padilla (15–10)	Fruto (2–2)	Wilson (2–2)	30,766	76–84
161	September 30	Rangers	3–1	Hernández (12–14)	Millwood (16–12)	Putz (35)	23,310	77–84

October

#	Date	Opponent	Score	Win	Loss	Save	Attendance	Record
162	October 1	Rangers	3–2	Woods (7–4)	Tejeda (5–5)	Putz (36)	28,361	78–84

== Player stats ==
=== Batting ===
==== Starters by position ====
Note: Pos = Position; G = Games played; AB = At bats; H = Hits; Avg. = Batting average; HR = Home runs; RBI = Runs batted in

Pos	Player	G	AB	H	Avg.	HR	RBI
RF	Ichiro Suzuki	161	695	224	.322	9	49
C	Kenji Johjima	144	506	147	.291	18	76
LF	Raúl Ibañez	159	626	181	.289	33	123
SS	Yuniesky Betancourt	157	558	161	.289	8	47
2B	José López	151	603	170	.282	10	79
3B	Adrián Beltré	156	620	166	.268	25	89
1B	Richie Sexson	158	591	156	.264	34	107
DH	Carl Everett	92	308	70	.227	11	33
CF	Jeremy Reed	67	212	46	.217	6	17

==== Other batters ====
Note: G = Games played; AB = At bats; H = Hits; Avg. = Batting average; HR = Home runs; RBI = Runs batted in

Player	G	AB	H	Avg.	HR	RBI
Willie Bloomquist	102	251	62	.247	1	15
Ben Broussard	56	164	39	.238	8	17
René Rivera	35	99	15	.152	2	4
Chris Snelling	36	96	24	.250	3	8
Eduardo Pérez	43	87	17	.195	1	11
Adam Jones	32	74	16	.216	1	8
Mike Morse	21	43	16	.372	0	11
Roberto Petagine	31	27	5	.185	1	2
Matt Lawton	11	27	7	.259	0	1
Greg Dobbs	23	27	10	.370	0	3
T.J. Bohn	18	14	2	.143	1	2
Shin-Soo Choo	4	11	1	.091	0	0
Joe Borchard	6	9	2	.222	0	0
Oswaldo Navarro	4	3	2	.667	0	0
Guillermo Quiróz	1	2	0	.000	0	0

=== Pitching ===
==== Starting pitchers ====
Note: G = Games pitched; IP = Innings pitched; W = Wins; L = Losses; ERA = Earned run average; SO = Strikeouts

Player	G	IP	W	L	ERA	SO
Félix Hernández	31	191.0	12	14	4.52	176
Jarrod Washburn	31	187.0	8	14	4.67	103
Gil Meche	32	186.2	11	8	4.48	156
Jamie Moyer	25	160.0	6	12	4.39	82
Cha Seung Baek	6	34.1	4	1	3.67	23

==== Other pitchers ====
Note: G = Games pitched; IP = Innings pitched; W = Wins; L = Losses; ERA = Earned run average; SO = Strikeouts

Player	G	IP	W	L	ERA	SO
Joel Piñeiro	40	165.2	8	13	6.36	87
Jake Woods	37	105.1	7	4	4.20	66
Ryan Feierabend	4	17.0	0	1	3.71	11
César Jiménez	4	7.1	0	0	14.73	3
Francisco Cruceta	4	6.2	0	0	10.80	2

==== Relief pitchers ====
Note: G = Games pitched; IP = Innings pitched; W = Wins; L = Losses; H = Holds; SV = Saves; ERA = Earned run average; SO = Strikeouts

Player	G	IP	W	L	H	SV	ERA	SO
Jon Huber	16	16.2	2	1	6	0	1.08	11
Mark Lowe	15	18.2	1	0	6	0	1.93	20
Rafael Soriano	53	60.0	1	2	18	2	2.25	65
J. J. Putz	72	78.1	4	1	59	5	2.30	104
Eric O'Flaherty	15	11.0	0	0	1	0	4.09	6
Julio Mateo	48	53.2	9	4	7	0	4.19	31
George Sherrill	72	40.0	2	4	17	1	4.28	42
Sean Green	24	32.0	0	0	3	0	4.50	15
Jeff Harris	3	3.1	0	0	0	0	5.40	1
Eddie Guardado	28	23.0	1	3	2	5	5.48	22
Emiliano Fruto	23	36.0	2	2	1	1	5.50	34
Travis Chick	3	5.0	0	0	0	0	12.60	2
Jorge Campillo	1	2.1	0	0	0	0	15.43	1
Bobby Livingston	3	5.0	0	0	0	0	18.00	3
Clint Nageotte	1	1.0	0	0	0	0	27.00	1

=== Team statistics ===
Positions in brackets are in league with other MLB teams

==== Batting ====
Note: G = Games played; AB = At bats; H = Hits; R = Runs; Avg. = Batting average; HR = Home runs; RBI = Runs batted in

Team	G	AB	H	R	Avg.	HR	RBI
Mariners	162	5,670 (2nd)	1,540 (10th)	756 (21st)	.272 (11th)	172 (18th)	703 (24th)
Opponents	162	5,611	1,500	792	.267	183	758

==== Pitching ====
Note: G = Games pitched; IP = Innings pitched; W = Wins; L = Losses; ERA = Earned run average; SO = Strikeouts; SHO = Shutouts

Team	G	IP	W	L	ERA	SO	SHO
Mariners	162	1,446.2 (12th)	78 (18th)	84 (11th)	4.60 (19th)	1,067 (14th)	6 (22nd)

== Farm system ==
Level	Team	League	Manager
AAA	Tacoma Rainiers	Pacific Coast League	Dave Brundage
AA	San Antonio Missions	Texas League	Daren Brown
A	Inland Empire 66ers	California League	Gary Thurman
A	Wisconsin Timber Rattlers	Midwest League	Scott Steinmann
A-Short Season	Everett AquaSox	Northwest League	Dave Myers
Rookie	AZL Mariners	Arizona League	Dana Williams

League champions: Inland Empire

== Major League Baseball draft ==
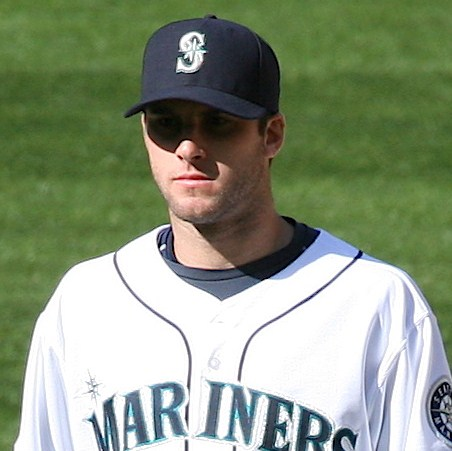
2006 Seattle Mariners draft picks
Brandon Morrow was the Mariners first round pick in 2006.
Information
**Owner**	Nintendo of America
**General Manager**	Bill Bavasi
**Manager**	Mike Hargrove
**First pick**	Brandon Morrow
**Draft positions**	5
**Number of selections**	50
**Players signed (Rule 4)**	26 (before deadline)
Links
**Results**	Baseball Reference
**Official Site**	The Official Site of the Seattle Mariners
**Years**	2005 • 2006 • 2007

Below is a complete list of Seattle Mariners draft picks from the June 2006 draft.

The Seattle Mariners took part in both the Major League Baseball Rule 4 draft but not the Rule 5 draft in 2006.

The 2006 Major League Baseball draft was held from June 6 to 7. The Mariners selected a total of 50 players in the draft. Of those 50 players, the Mariners signed 26 players. They did however sign multiple players after the draft deadline.

=== Key ===
Round (Pick)	Indicates the round and pick the player was drafted
Position	Indicates the secondary/collegiate position at which the player was drafted, rather than the professional position the player may have gone on to play
**Bold**	Indicates the player signed with the Mariners
Italics	Indicates the player did not sign with the Mariners

=== Table ===
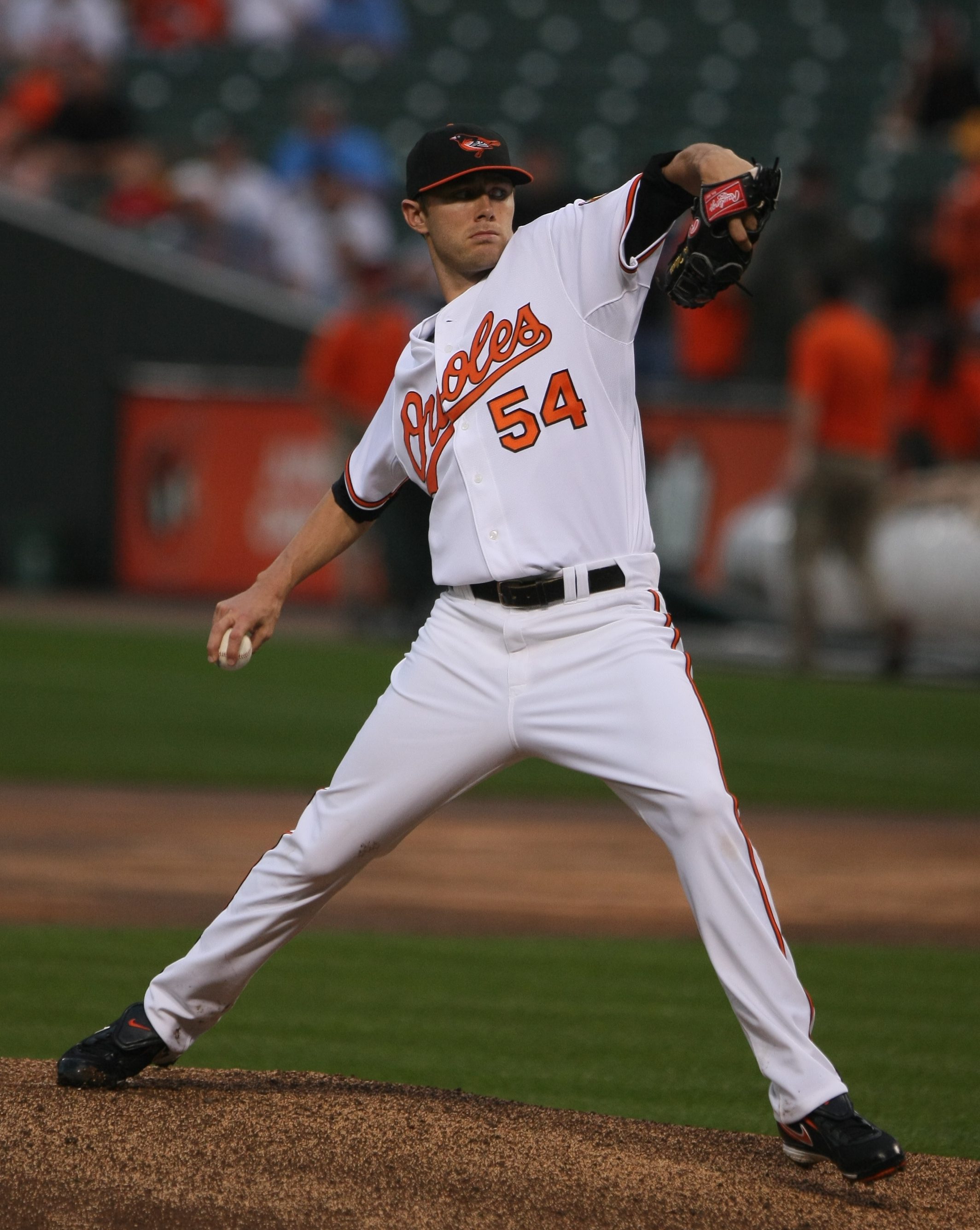
In the second round the Mariners selected Chris Tillman.

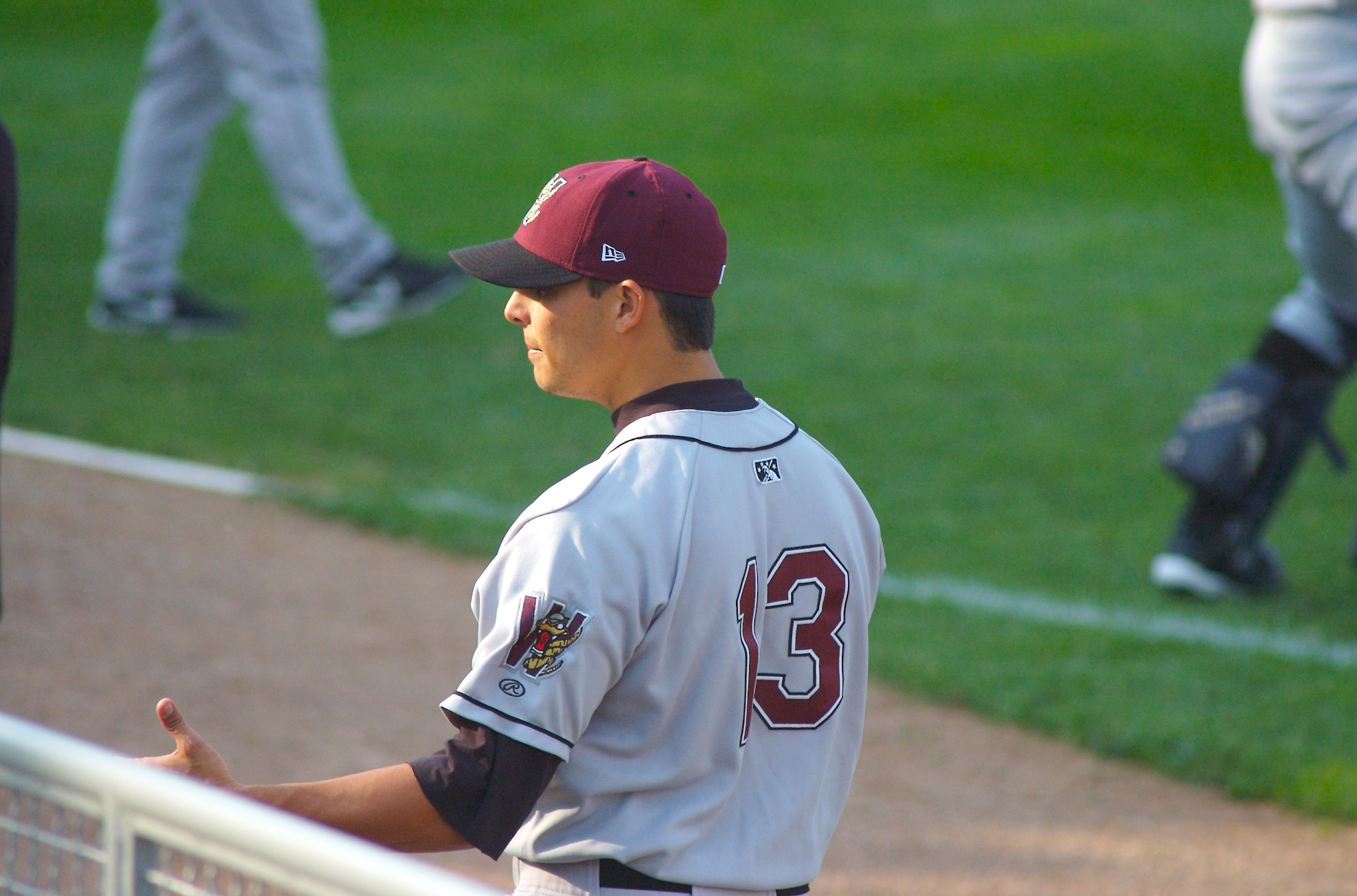
Ricky Orta was the Mariners fourth round selection.

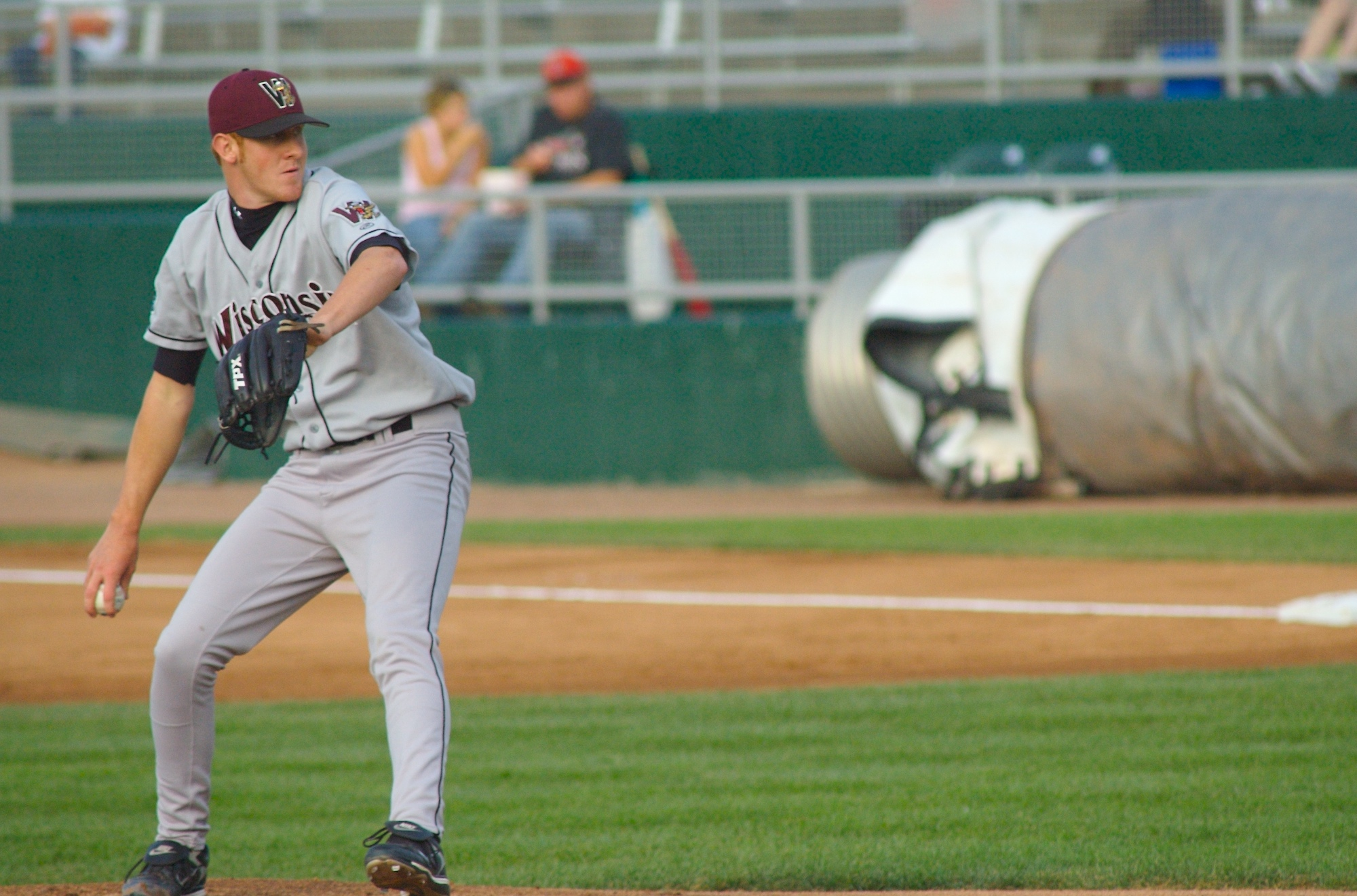
Nathan Adcock was pick number 141 in the fifth round.

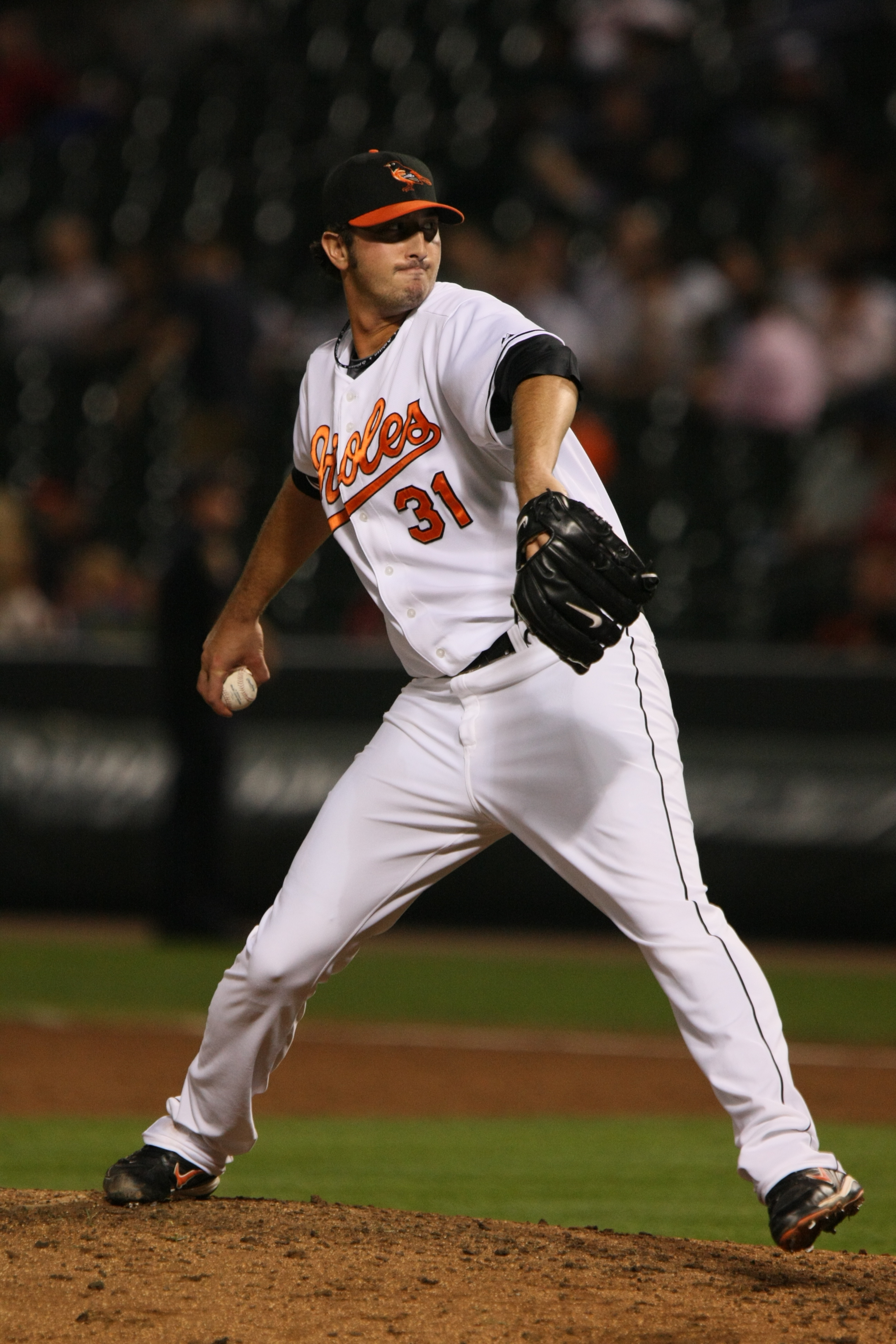
Kam Mickolio was selected in the 18th round by the Mariners.

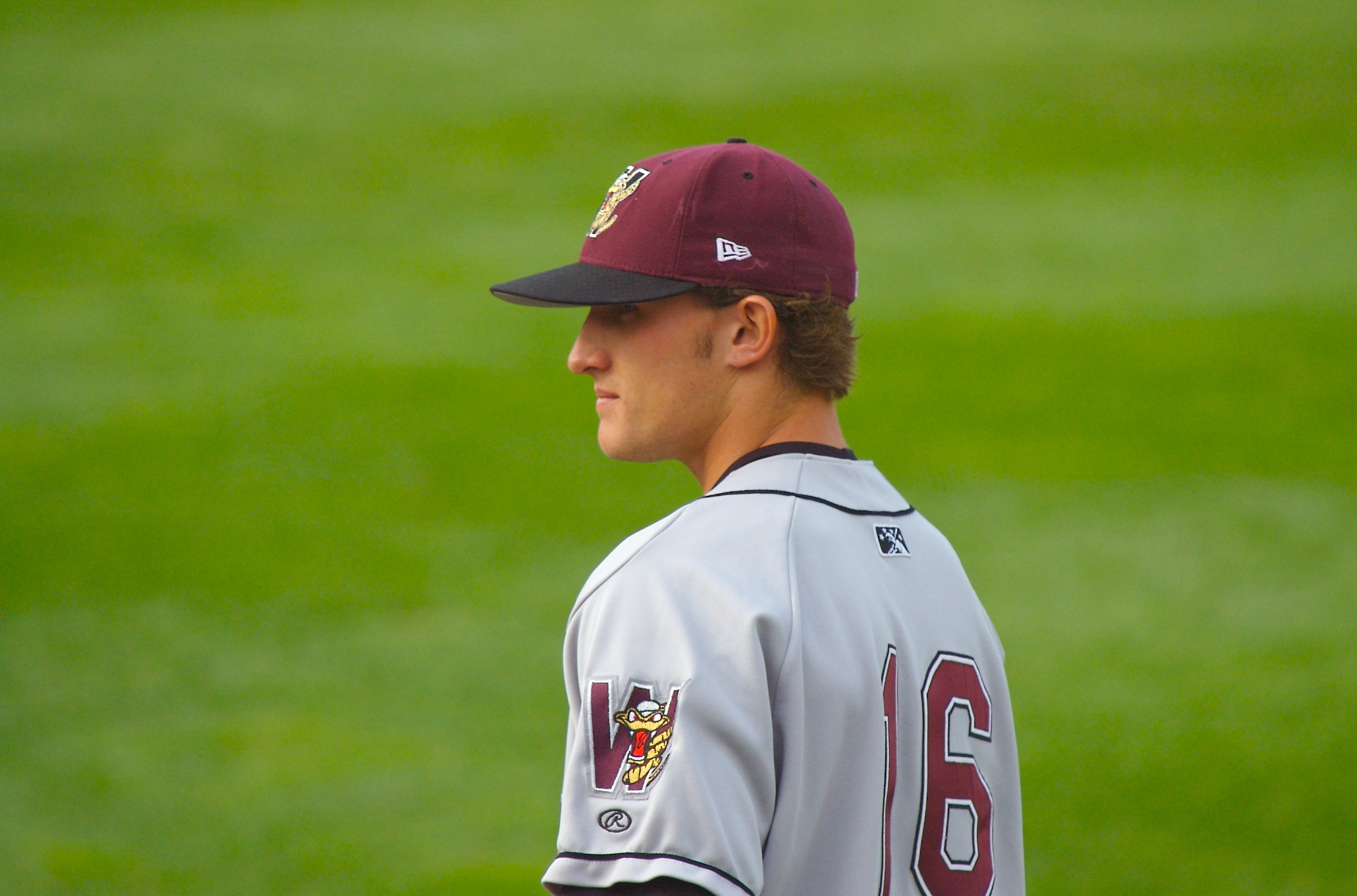
Kyle Parker was the Mariners 24th round draft pick out of the University of Washington.

Round (Pick)	Name	Position	School	Ref
1 (5)	**Brandon Morrow**	Right-handed pitcher	University of California, Berkeley	
2 (49)	**Chris Tillman**	Right-handed pitcher	Fountain Valley High School	
3 (81)	**Anthony Butler**	Left-handed pitcher	Oak Creek High School	
4 (111)	**Ricky Orta**	Right-handed pitcher	University of Miami	
5 (141)	**Nathan Adcock**	Right-handed pitcher	North Hardin High School	
6 (171)	**Adam Moore**	Catcher	University of Texas at Arlington	
7 (201)	**Doug Fister**	Right-handed pitcher	Fresno State	
8 (231)	Steven Richard	Right-handed pitcher	Clemson University	
9 (261)	**Justin Souza**	Right-handed pitcher	Sacramento City College	
10 (291)	**Christopher Minaker**	Shortstop	Stanford University	
11 (321)	**Aaron Solomon**	Right-handed pitcher	Cumberland University	
12 (351)	**Gavin Dickey**	Outfielder	University of Florida	
13 (381)	**Joseph Kantakevich**	Right-handed pitcher	College of William & Mary	
14 (411)	Jared Baehl	Third baseman	North Posey High School	
15 (441)	**Andrew Fiorenza**	Right-handed pitcher	Clemson University	
16 (471)	**Austin Bibens-Dirkx**	Right-handed pitcher	University of Portland	
17 (501)	Dan Runzler	Left-handed pitcher	University of California, Riverside	
18 (531)	**Kam Mickolio**	Right-handed pitcher	Utah Valley State College	
19 (561)	Cameron Nobles	Right-handed pitcher	Jackson High School	
20 (591)	**Johan Limonta**	First baseman	Miami Dade College	
21 (621)	**Brent Gaphardt**	Left-handed pitcher	University of Delaware	
22 (651)	**Fabian Williamson**	Left-handed pitcher	Kennedy High School	
23 (681)	**Marcos Villezcas**	Shortstop	Brigham Young University	
24 (711)	**Kyle Parker**	Right-handed pitcher	University of Washington	
25 (741)	**Tyson Gillies**	Outfielder	R. E. Mountain Secondary School	
26 (771)	**Gregory Moviel**	Left-handed pitcher	Vanderbilt University	
27 (801)	**Bryan Ball**	Right-handed pitcher	University of Florida	
28 (831)	**Everett Collis**	Right-handed pitcher	Cornell University	
29 (861)	**Gregory Nesbitt**	Left-handed pitcher	James Madison University	
30 (891)	**Matthew Vogel**	Shortstop	Lewis–Clark State College	
31 (921)	David McClain	Right-handed pitcher	San Jacinto College	
32 (951)	Joe Agreste	First baseman	Potomac State College	
33 (981)	**Robert Harmon**	Right-handed pitcher	University of Arkansas at Little Rock	
34 (1011)	**Stanley Posluszny**	Outfielder	West Virginia University	
35 (1041)	**Alex Meneses**	Shortstop	Barry University	
36 (1071)	Kyle Haas	Right-handed pitcher	Douglas College	
37 (1101)	Christopher Walden	Right-handed pitcher	Bellefontaine High School	
38 (1131)	Michael Drake	Outfielder	Cosumnes River College	
39 (1161)	**Philip Roy**	Right-handed pitcher	Miami Dade College	
40 (1191)	**Haley Winter**	Right-handed pitcher	University of California, Riverside	
41 (1221)	**Brandon Fromm**	First baseman	San Jose State University	
42 (1251)	Shane Cox	Right-handed pitcher	Alvin Community College	
43 (1280)	Clint Straka	Right-handed pitcher	Northern Oklahoma College	
44 (1309)	Bryan Earley	Right-handed pitcher	Elder High School	
45 (1338)	Jeremy Camacho	Shortstop	Eagle Rock High School	
46 (1367)	**Robbie Dominguez**	Right-handed pitcher	Cerritos College	
47 (1395)	Sean Ward	Outfielder	Evans High School	
48 (1423)	Jeremy Beeching	Left-handed pitcher	Volunteer State Community College	
49 (1451)	Nathan Tacker	Right-handed pitcher	Rice University	
50 (1479)	Tyler Sanford	Catcher	Saguaro High School	
