= Jon Huber =

American baseball player (born 1981)

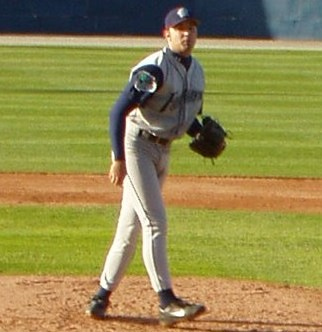
- Huber with the Fort Wayne Wizards in 2003
- Relief pitcher
- Born: July 7, 1981 (age 45); Sacramento, California, U.S.
- Batted: Right Threw: Right

MLB debut
- August 30, 2006, for the Seattle Mariners

Last MLB appearance
- September 25, 2007, for the Seattle Mariners

MLB statistics
- Win–loss record: 2–1
- Earned run average: 2.57
- Strikeouts: 19
- Stats at Baseball Reference

Teams
- Seattle Mariners (2006–2007)

Jonathon Lloyd "Jon" Huber (born July 7, 1981) is an American former professional baseball pitcher. Huber played two seasons in Major League Baseball (MLB), both with the Seattle Mariners, in 2006 and 2007. Over his major league career, Huber compiled a win-loss record of 2–1 with a 2.57 ERA, and 19 strikeouts in 25 games.

== Early life and amateur career ==
Huber was born on July 7, 1981, in Sacramento, California. He attended North Fort Myers High School in Fort Myers, Florida. He is one of four players from North Fort Myers High School to have Major League Baseball experience including Mike Greenwell, Jim Miller, and Deion Sanders.

== Professional career ==
=== San Diego Padres ===
Huber was drafted by the San Diego Padres in the 5th round (139th overall) of the 2000 Major League Baseball draft. He began his professional career in 2000 with the rookie-level Arizona League Padres. Huber went 1–4 with a 6.60 ERA, and 39 strikeouts in 14 games; 10 starts. In 2001 Huber played for the rookie-level Idaho Falls Padres of the Pioneer League. He went 5–9 with a 6.04 ERA, and 75 strikeouts in 15 games; all starts. Huber was promoted to the Single-A Fort Wayne Wizards of the Midwest League in 2002. He went 8–12 with a 5.12 ERA, and 86 strikeouts in 28 games; 26 starts. Huber was first on the team in losses, complete games (2), hits allowed (168), runs allowed (99), and walks allowed (59); second in games started, wins, strikeouts, and home runs allowed (7); and third in innings pitched (149). In 2003 Huber split the season between the Single-A Fort Wayne Wizards and the High-A Lake Elsinore Storm. With the Wizards, Huber went 1–1 with a 3.76 ERA, and 34 strikeouts in 7 games; all starts. In 12 games with the Storm, Huber went 3–5 with a 5.18 ERA, and 43 strikeouts in 57 1/3 innings pitched. In his final season in the Padres' organization, Huber played for the High-A Lake Elsinore Storm. He went 8–6 with a 3.70 ERA, and 100 strikeouts in 20 games; all starts. Huber lead the Storm in wins; was second in strikeouts, home runs allowed (9), and walks allowed (44); and was third in innings pitched (107), hits allowed (107), losses, games started, and runs allowed (44).

=== Seattle Mariners ===
Huber was acquired by the Seattle Mariners on July 30, 2004, in exchange for utility player Dave Hansen. He spent the rest of the 2004 season with the High-A Inland Empire 66ers in the Mariners' organization. Huber went 4–1 with a 6.12 ERA, and 38 strikeouts in 7 games; five starts. After the season, Huber played in the Arizona Fall League with the Peoria Javelinas. He went 0–1 with a 6.43 ERA, and 27 strikeouts in 8 games; all starts in the AFL. In 2005, Huber attended spring training with the Mariners, however, he did not make the final roster and was assigned to minor league camp on March 16. That season, Huber was assigned to play with the Double-A San Antonio Missions of the Texas League. He went 7–8 with a 4.74 ERA, and 112 strikeouts in 26 games; all starts. Huber was first on the Missions in shutouts (one), earned runs allowed (78); second in losses, games started, runs allowed (87), home runs allowed (11), walks allowed (49), and strikeouts; and third in innings pitched (148), and hits allowed (159). He made his major league debut in 2006 with the Seattle Mariners after replacing injured pitcher Julio Mateo. In his major league debut on August 30, 2006, against the Los Angeles Angels of Anaheim, he struck out Howie Kendrick, the only batter he faced in 1/3 innings pitched. Before being promoted to the majors, Huber was 3–1 with a 2.61 ERA and 12 saves in 13 chances with the Triple-A Tacoma Rainiers. He appeared in 16 games with the Mariners in 2006 and another nine in 2007, with a 2–1 record and 2.57 ERA.

=== Lancaster Barnstormers and Atlanta Braves ===
He became a free agent at the end of the 2008 season and signed a minor league contract with the Detroit Tigers in February 2009. The Tigers released him at the end of spring training and he signed with the Independent Lancaster Barnstormers of the Atlantic League. He appeared in 18 games with Lancaster before signing a minor league deal with the Atlanta Braves, who assigned him to the Triple-A Gwinnett Braves. He began the 2010 season with the Double-A Mississippi Braves, but he was released after just three appearances.

=== Los Angeles Dodgers ===
Huber subsequently signed with the Los Angeles Dodgers and was assigned to the Double-A Chattanooga Lookouts. He became the closer for the Lookouts, appearing in 36 games with a 2.23 ERA and 18 saves.

On November 24, 2010, Huber re-signed with the Dodgers organization on a new minor league contract. In 2011, he was assigned to the Triple-A Albuquerque Isotopes. Huber appeared in 8 games with a 10.24 ERA before he was released by the Dodgers on May 7, 2011.
