= Dave Hansen (baseball) =

American baseball player (born 1968)

- Third baseman / First baseman
- Born: November 24, 1968 (age 57); Long Beach, California, U.S.
- Batted: Left Threw: Right

Professional debut
- MLB: September 16, 1990, for the Los Angeles Dodgers
- NPB: April 3, 1998, for the Hanshin Tigers

Last appearance
- MLB: October 2, 2005, for the Seattle Mariners
- NPB: October 12, 1998, for the Hanshin Tigers

MLB statistics
- Batting average: .260
- Home runs: 35
- Runs batted in: 222

NPB statistics
- Batting average: .253
- Home runs: 11
- Runs batted in: 55
- Stats at Baseball Reference

Teams
- As player: Los Angeles Dodgers (1990–1996); Chicago Cubs (1997); Hanshin Tigers (1998); Los Angeles Dodgers (1999–2002); San Diego Padres (2003–2004); Seattle Mariners (2004–2005); As coach: Los Angeles Dodgers (2011–2012); Seattle Mariners (2013); Los Angeles Angels of Anaheim / Los Angeles Angels (2014–2017)

David Andrew Hansen (born November 24, 1968) is an American former Major League Baseball (MLB) player, specializing as a pinch hitter. He played in MLB for the Los Angeles Dodgers, Chicago Cubs, San Diego Padres and Seattle Mariners and in Nippon Professional Baseball (NPB) for the Hanshin Tigers. He also was a coach in MLB for the Dodgers, Mariners, Los Angeles Angels.

== Professional career ==
=== Los Angeles Dodgers ===
Hansen was drafted by the Los Angeles Dodgers in the 2nd round of the 1986 MLB draft out of John A. Rowland High School in California. He made his Major League debut for the Dodgers on September 16, 1990 against the Cincinnati Reds, striking out as a pinch hitter. His first career hit was in his first career start, in the last game of the season, October 3, against the San Diego Padres. He hit an RBI single in the bottom of the fifth inning off of Padres starter Eric Show. He remained with the Dodgers through the 1996 season, playing third base and first base but mostly appearing as a pinch hitter.

=== Chicago Cubs ===
Hansen signed with the Chicago Cubs as a free agent prior to the 1997 season. In 90 games with the Cubs, he hit .311.

On April 10, 1997, he broke up a no-hitter at Wrigley Field that was being thrown by the Florida Marlins' Alex Fernandez with a one-out pinch hit single in the ninth inning. The Chicago Tribune called Hansen's hit a "wicked one-out one-hopper."

=== Hanshin Tigers ===
Hansen played with the Hanshin Tigers in Japan in 1998.

=== Los Angeles Dodgers (2nd stint) ===
Hansen re-signed with the Dodgers as a free agent in 1999. In 2000, he set a Major League record with seven pinch-hit home runs.

=== San Diego Padres/Seattle Mariners ===
He signed with the San Diego Padres prior to the 2003 season. After one season with the Padres, where he hit .244 in 110 games, he was traded to the Seattle Mariners (along with Wiki Gonzalez, Kevin Jarvis and minor leaguer Vince Faison) for Jeff Cirillo, Brian Sweeney and cash. He appeared in 57 games with the Mariners, hitting .282 before they traded him back to the Padres on July 30, 2004 for Jon Huber. He was signed by the Cubs as a free agent for 2005 but was released at the end of spring training and returned to the Mariners.

Hansen retired at the end of the 2005 season. He told Baseball Digest magazine that he describes pinch-hitting not as a position, not as a role, but "a state of mind."

As of 2006, Hansen ranked sixth all-time in Major League Baseball career pinch hits with 138.

== Coaching career ==
Hansen was the hitting coach for the Mobile BayBears, the Arizona Diamondbacks Double-A affiliate in 2007. On September 26, 2007, Hansen was named the Diamondbacks minor league hitting coordinator.

On November 22, 2010 he was announced as a secondary hitting instructor by the Los Angeles Dodgers. On July 20, 2011, he was named interim hitting coach by the team. He had the interim tag removed when he was retained for the job in 2012. After the 2012 season, Hansen was dismissed from the position of hitting coach and offered another position within the baseball organization.

Hansen was hired as hitting coach for the Seattle Mariners on October 22, 2012.

For the 2014 season, Hansen was hired as an assistant hitting coach for the Los Angeles Angels of Anaheim, along with Don Baylor, the newly acquired principal hitting coach and former Angels slugger.

On November 3, 2015, the Angels promoted Hansen to hitting coach after parting ways with Baylor. Paul Sorrento served as his assistant hitting coach.

At the end of the 2017 season, Hansen was let go by the Angels, then hired by the San Francisco Giants as their minor league organization's hitting coordinator.

Preceded by Unknown	Mobile BayBears hitting coach 2007	Succeeded by Turner Ward
Preceded by Jeff Pentland	Los Angeles Dodgers hitting coach 2011–2012	Succeeded by Mark McGwire
Preceded by Chris Chambliss	Seattle Mariners hitting coach 2013	Succeeded by Howard Johnson
Preceded by Unknown	Los Angeles Angels of Anaheim Assistant Hitting Coach; 2014-2015	Succeeded by Paul Sorrento
Preceded by Don Baylor	Los Angeles Angels of Anaheim Hitting Coach; 2016–2017	Succeeded by Eric Hinske
