= Jeremy Reed =

American baseball player and coach (born 1981)

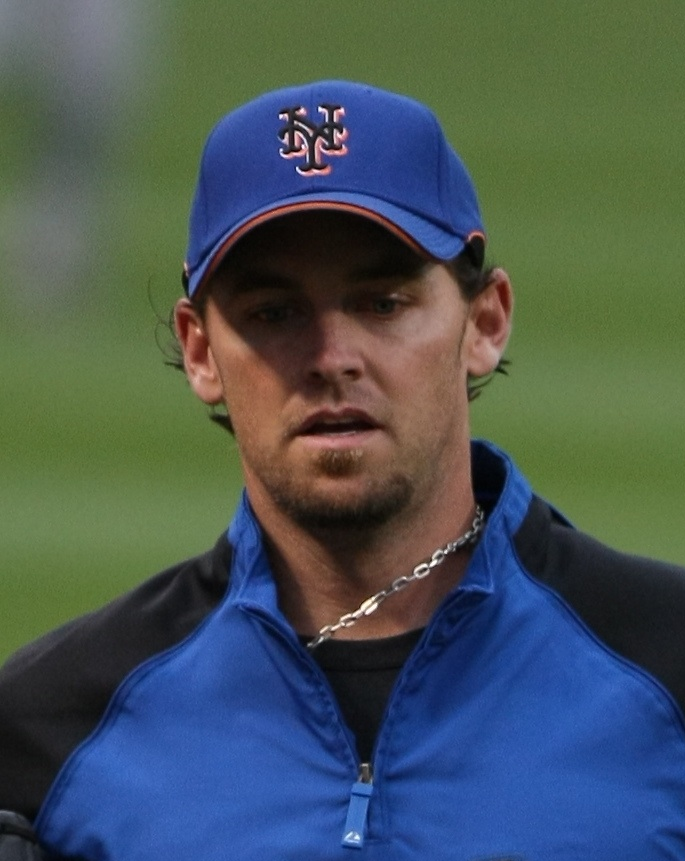
- Reed with the Mets in 2009
- Outfielder / Coach
- Born: June 15, 1981 (age 44); San Dimas, California, U.S.
- Batted: Left Threw: Left

MLB debut
- September 8, 2004, for the Seattle Mariners

Last MLB appearance
- April 10, 2011, for the Milwaukee Brewers

MLB statistics
- Batting average: .252
- Home runs: 12
- Runs batted in: 110
- Stats at Baseball Reference

Teams
- As player: Seattle Mariners (2004–2008); New York Mets (2009); Toronto Blue Jays (2010); Milwaukee Brewers (2011); As coach: Los Angeles Angels (2019–2022)

Jeremy Thomas Reed (born June 15, 1981) is an American former professional baseball outfielder and coach. He played in Major League Baseball (MLB) for the Seattle Mariners, New York Mets, Toronto Blue Jays and Milwaukee Brewers. He was the hitting coach for the Los Angeles Angels.

== Early life ==
Reed graduated from Bonita High School in La Verne, California in 1999, and went on to play college baseball at Long Beach State University. He also played for the USA Summer National Team in 2001 and 2002.

== Professional career ==
Reed was drafted by the Chicago White Sox as the 59th overall pick (2nd round) of the 2002 MLB draft.

In 2003, he was honored as the minor league player of the year, batting .333 for Single-A Winston-Salem in 66 games and .409 for Double-A Birmingham in 65 games.

In June 2004, Reed, along with Miguel Olivo and Mike Morse, was traded to the Seattle Mariners for Freddy García, Ben Davis, and cash.

He led all major league center fielders in range factor (3.05) in 2005.

In March 2006, Reed injured his wrist when he ran into the padding in the outfield attempting to make a catch. Later in July, Reed broke his right thumb trying to make a diving catch in the 11th inning, and he was placed on the 60-day DL. He missed the remainder of the season.

Ichiro Suzuki moved to center field in mid-August 2006, taking Reed's starting job. In March 2007, Reed was optioned to Triple-A. He spent most of the season with the Tacoma Rainiers, and returned to the major leagues as a September call-up.

In 2008, his number was changed to 8 because manager John McLaren took 7, his number during his playing days. In May, Reed was recalled from Triple-A Tacoma and joined the Mariners for their game against the Detroit Tigers.

In December 2008, he was traded to the New York Mets along with J. J. Putz and Sean Green in a three-team trade. Since many of the Mets major players on their 25-man roster were injured for most of 2009, he was given the ability to play a majority of the season in the majors in right field or at 1st base. He was non-tendered at the end of the 2009 season, making him a free agent.

On January 19, 2010, Reed signed a minor league deal with the Toronto Blue Jays with an invite to 2010 spring training. While he did not make the team out of spring training, Reed was called up to the major league roster on April 12. On July 2, Reed was outrighted to Triple-A Las Vegas by Toronto and became a free agent after refusing the assignment. On July 14, Reed was signed by the Chicago White Sox and assigned to the Triple-A Charlotte Knights.

Reed signed a minor league contract with a spring training invite for the Milwaukee Brewers on January 21, 2011. The Brewers purchased his contract at the end of spring training and added him to the major league roster. He was designated for assignment on April 11, to make room on the 25-man roster for Jonathan Lucroy. He was traded to the Minnesota Twins on June 2 for future considerations. He was assigned to the Triple-A Rochester Red Wings. On October 11, he elected free agency.

On January 10, 2013, he signed a minor league contract with a spring training invite with the Arizona Diamondbacks.

== Coaching career ==
Reed retired before 2013 spring training and was named minor league hitting coordinator for the Milwaukee Brewers for the 2014 season.

He served as the Los Angeles Angels minor league hitting coordinator from 2017 to 2018. In November 2018, he was promoted by the Angels to be their major league hitting coach. Reed was ejected for the first time in his major league career on April 12, 2022, for arguing a check swing call on Matt Duffy. He was let go by the Angels after the 2022 season.
