= Chris Carter (outfielder) =

American baseball player (born 1982)

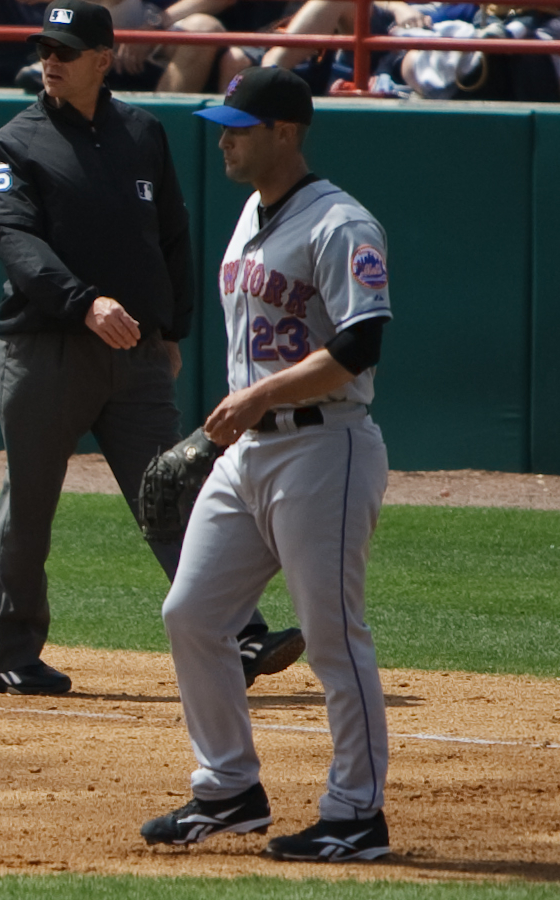
- Carter with the New York Mets
- Outfielder
- Born: September 16, 1982 (age 44); Fremont, California, U.S.
- Batted: Left Threw: Left

Professional debut
- MLB: June 5, 2008, for the Boston Red Sox
- NPB: April 28, 2012, for the Saitama Seibu Lions

Last appearance
- MLB: October 3, 2010, for the New York Mets
- NPB: August 11, 2013, for the Saitama Seibu Lions

MLB statistics
- Batting average: .263
- Home runs: 4
- Runs batted in: 28

NPB statistics
- Batting average: .263
- Home runs: 4
- Runs batted in: 30
- Stats at Baseball Reference

Teams
- Boston Red Sox (2008–2009); New York Mets (2010); Saitama Seibu Lions (2012–2013)
Medals
Men's baseball
Representing United States
World Junior Baseball Championship
Silver medal – second place	2000 Edmonton	Team

William Christopher Carter (born September 16, 1982), nicknamed "Animal", is an American former professional baseball outfielder. He played in Major League Baseball (MLB) for the Boston Red Sox and New York Mets between 2008 and 2010. He also played in Nippon Professional Baseball (NPB) for the Saitama Seibu Lions from 2012 to 2013.

== Career ==
=== High school ===
Carter attended De La Salle High School in Concord, California, and graduated in 2001. He hit for a batting average of .571 and led the league in home runs as a senior, and was named his team's MVP. He also was named a 2001 Preseason First Team All-American by Baseball America and Bay Valley Athletic League MVP in 2001.

He was twice selected as North Coast Section High School Sports Focus Scholar-Athlete of the Year (2000, '01) and earned honorable mention All-American honors from USA Today as a junior in 2000.

His father, Bill Carter, was his high school coach.

=== College ===
Carter attended Stanford University, where he majored in human biology and was Pre-Med, graduating in just three years. He was awarded Stanford's Most Valuable Freshman Award in 2002 and helped the Cardinal to the final eight in the 2002 College World Series and 2003 College World Series. He was mainly a designated hitter for the team, and played some outfield as well. In 2002 and 2003, he played collegiate summer baseball in the Cape Cod Baseball League for the Yarmouth-Dennis Red Sox.

=== Minor leagues ===
Carter was drafted as a first baseman and outfielder by the Arizona Diamondbacks in the 17th round (506th overall) of the 2004 Major League Baseball draft.

In 2004, Carter played for the Single-A Yakima Bears and South Bend Silver Hawks. In 2005, he played for the Single-A Lancaster JetHawks and Double-A Tennessee Smokies. In 2006 and 2007, Carter played for the Triple-A Tucson Sidewinders.

After expressing a desire to be traded, Carter was traded by the Diamondbacks on August 21, 2007, to the Washington Nationals for Emiliano Fruto. He was subsequently sent to the Red Sox as the player to be named later in the August 17 trade of Wily Mo Peña from the Red Sox to the Nationals. After the trade, Carter was assigned to Triple-A Pawtucket.

On November 20, 2007, Carter was placed on the Red Sox 40-man roster.

=== Boston Red Sox ===
Carter made his major league debut on June 5, 2008. He went 2-for-3 with two runs scored after entering the game when Coco Crisp was ejected in the second inning. With the Red Sox facing a possible Crisp suspension and injuries to both Jacoby Ellsbury and Manny Ramírez, Carter was sent back to Pawtucket on June 6 in favor of Brandon Moss.

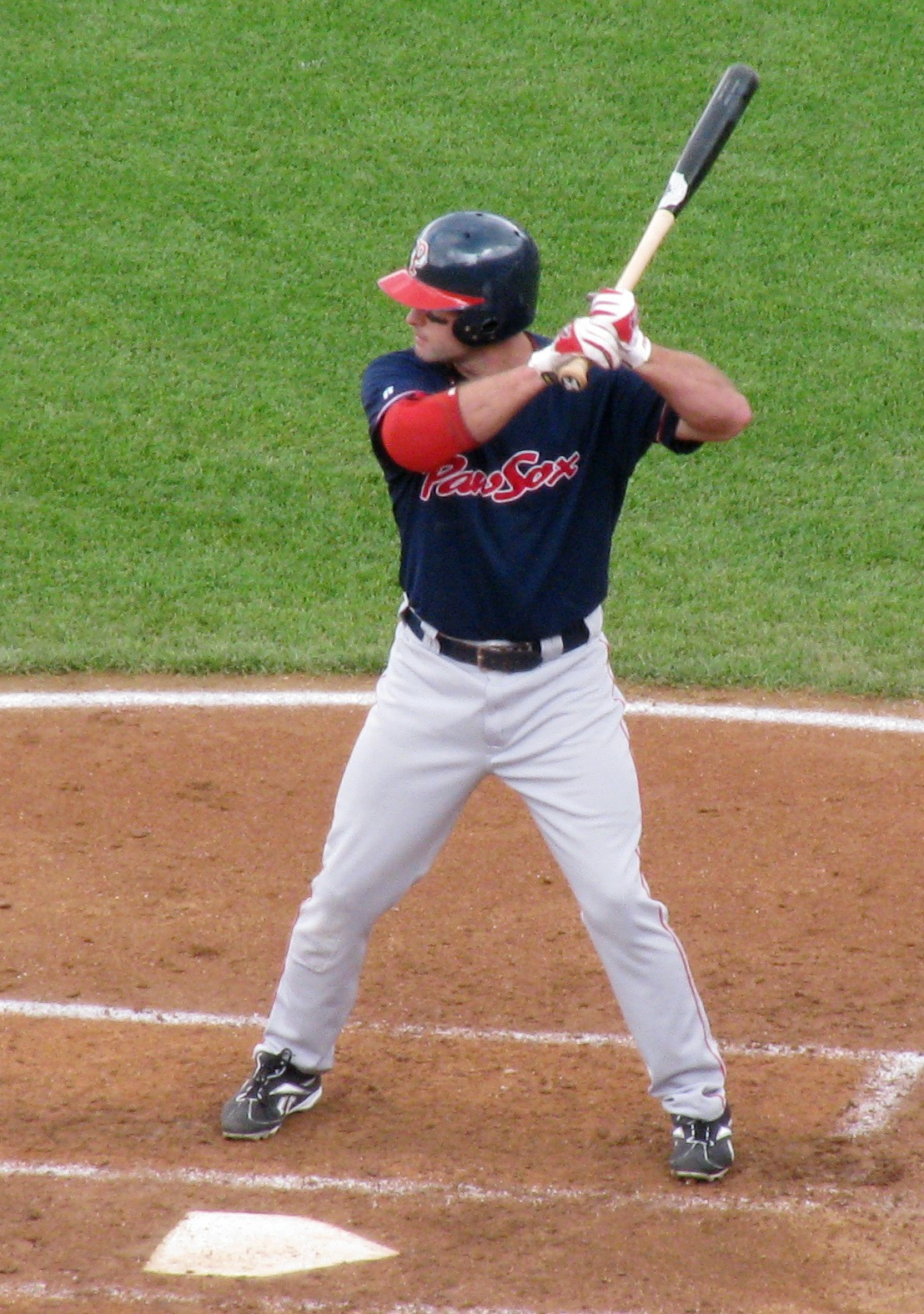
Carter batting for the Pawtucket Red Sox in 2009

In the 2009 season, Carter made the Red Sox Opening Day roster. He filled the final spot on the bench until Mark Kotsay returned from the disabled list.

=== New York Mets ===
Carter was traded to the New York Mets as a player to be named later in the deal for Billy Wagner, and was then added to the 40-man roster. During spring training, Carter was given the nickname "The Animal" by Mets manager Jerry Manuel for his relentless drive and work ethic.

On May 10, 2010, the Mets promoted Carter from the Buffalo Bisons to fill Frank Catalonotto's roster spot. On May 11, 2010, his first at-bat as a Met, in the bottom of the eighth inning, he hit a double that drove in the winning run against the Washington Nationals.

On June 11, 2010, Carter hit his first major league home run against Baltimore Orioles pitcher Jeremy Guthrie as the designated hitter. Two days later, Carter, again playing DH, hit his second home run against Orioles pitcher Kevin Millwood.

=== Tampa Bay Rays ===
Carter agreed a minor league contract with the Tampa Bay Rays on January 6, 2011. He opted out of his contract on June 16.

=== Atlanta Braves ===
Carter signed a minor league contract with the Atlanta Braves on June 18, 2011.

=== Saitama Seibu Lions ===
On March 3, 2012, Carter signed with the Saitama Seibu Lions of the Pacific League of Nippon Professional Baseball. Carter was waived by the Lions after the 2012 season.

In the first part of 2013 he played for the semi-professional Ishikawa Million Stars in the independent Baseball Challenge League. On June 16, 2013, it was announced that Carter would be returning to the Saitama Seibu Lions.

=== Acereros de Monclova ===
On April 24, 2014, Carter signed with the Acereros de Monclova of the Mexican League. In 27 appearances for Monclova, he batted .384/.410/.485 with two home runs and 14 RBI. Carter was released by the Acereros on June 13.

=== Vaqueros Laguna ===
On June 14, 2014, Carter signed with the Vaqueros Laguna of the Mexican League. In 13 appearances for the Vaqueros, he slashed .269/.321/.404 with one home run and eight RBI. Carter was released by Laguna on July 1.
