= Wily Mo Peña =

Dominican baseball player (born 1982)

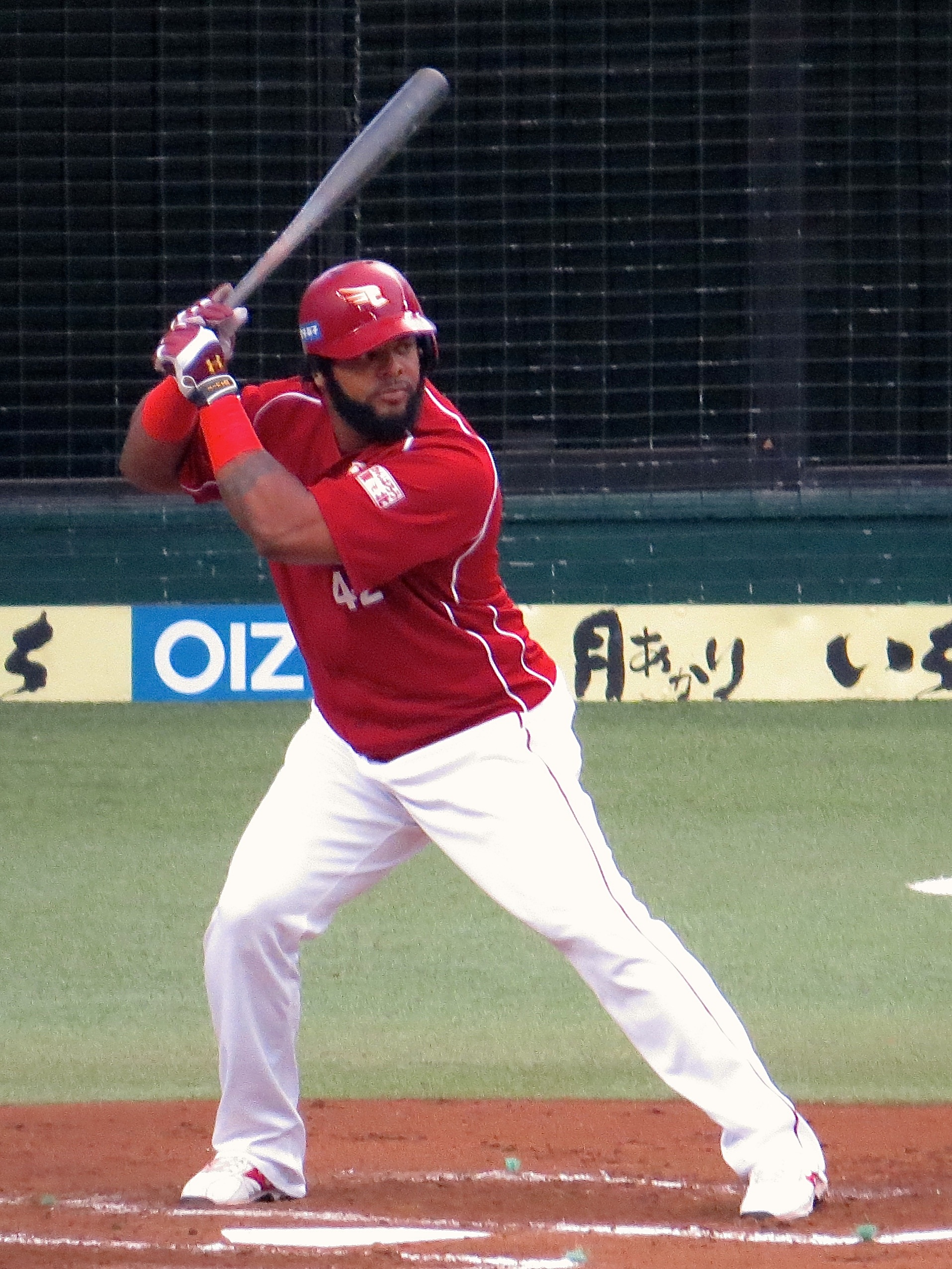
- Peña with the Tohoku Rakuten Golden Eagles in 2015
- Outfielder
- Born: January 23, 1982 (age 44); Laguna Salada, Dominican Republic
- Batted: Right Threw: Right

Professional debut
- MLB: September 10, 2002, for the Cincinnati Reds
- NPB: March 30, 2012, for the Fukuoka SoftBank Hawks

Last appearance
- MLB: September 25, 2011, for the Seattle Mariners
- NPB: October 4, 2017, for the Chiba Lotte Marines

MLB statistics
- Batting average: .250
- Home runs: 84
- Runs batted in: 240

NPB statistics
- Batting average: .261
- Home runs: 86
- Runs batted in: 260
- Stats at Baseball Reference

Teams
- Cincinnati Reds (2002–2005); Boston Red Sox (2006–2007); Washington Nationals (2007–2008); Arizona Diamondbacks (2011); Seattle Mariners (2011); Fukuoka SoftBank Hawks (2012–2013); Orix Buffaloes (2014); Tohoku Rakuten Golden Eagles (2015); Chiba Lotte Marines (2017)

Career highlights and awards
- 2× NPB All-Star (2012, 2014); Best Nine Award (2012)

Wily Modesto Peña Gutierrez (born January 23, 1982) is a Dominican former professional baseball outfielder. He played in Major League Baseball (MLB) for the Cincinnati Reds, Boston Red Sox, Washington Nationals, Arizona Diamondbacks and Seattle Mariners, and in NPB for the Fukuoka SoftBank Hawks and Orix Buffaloes. At 6 feet, 3 inches in height and nearly 300 pounds, the right-handed batting and throwing Peña is considered a pure power hitter best known for his long-distance home runs and high strikeout rate.

== Professional career ==
Originally signed by the New York Mets as an amateur free agent in 1998, Peña signed with the New York Yankees about a year later and was traded to the Cincinnati Reds for third baseman/designated hitter Drew Henson and outfielder Michael Coleman in 2001.

=== Cincinnati Reds ===
Pena debuted with the Reds as a September call-up in 2002, and got a single while pinch hitting in his first major league at-bat. Peña proved his label as a power hitter, hitting a home run in his second major league game, off Chicago Cubs pitcher Steve Smyth.

From 2003 through 2005, Peña was a fourth outfielder with the Reds, and saw substantial playing time in center field covering for the often injured Ken Griffey Jr., and backing up Austin Kearns in right field. Over his career in Cincinnati, Peña batted .248 with 51 home runs and 134 RBIs in 302 games.

=== Boston Red Sox ===
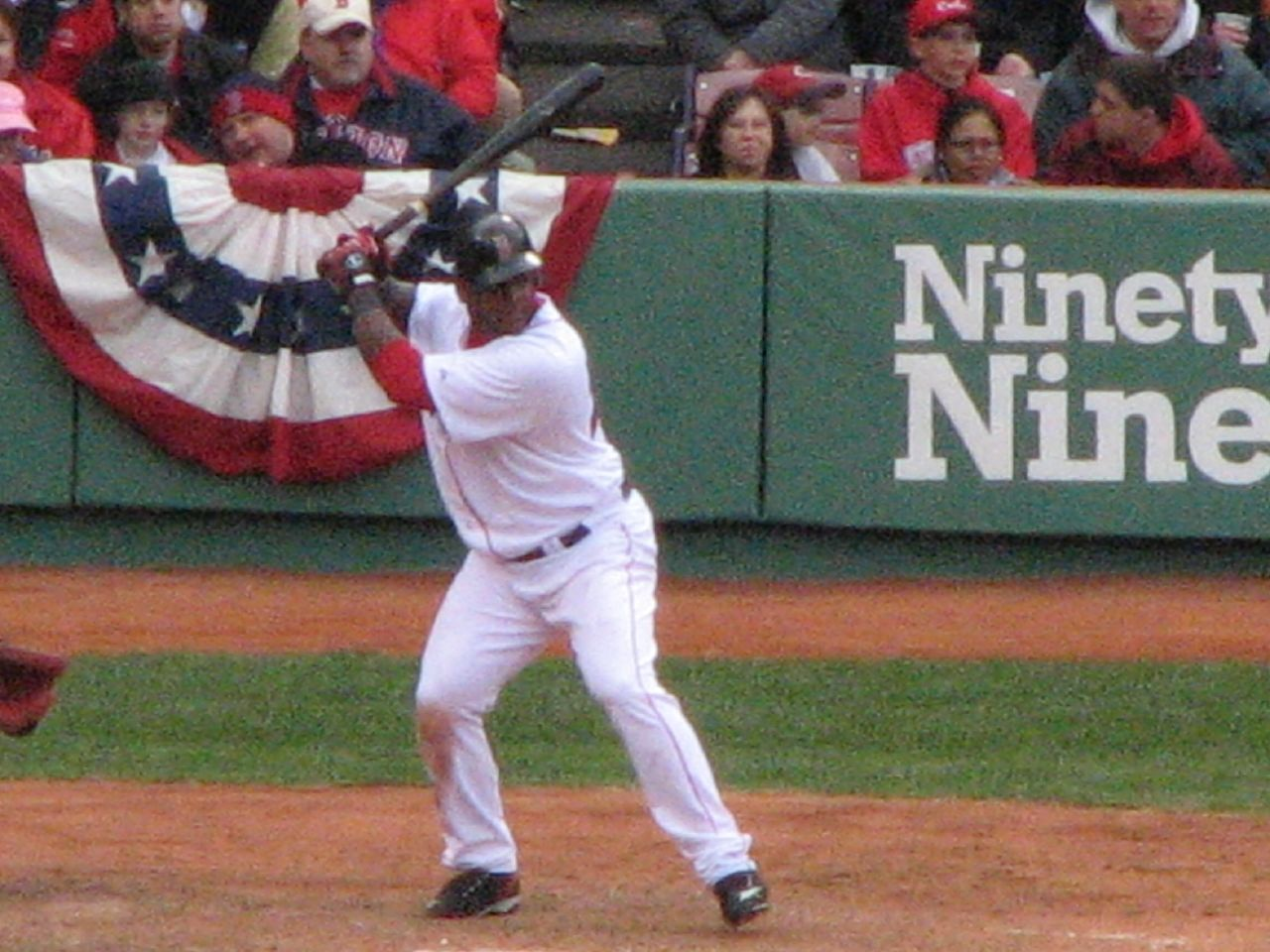
Peña during his time with the Red Sox.

The Reds traded Peña to the Boston Red Sox during spring training in 2006 for pitcher Bronson Arroyo. Over the course of the season, Peña again served as a fourth outfielder and one half of a platoon in right field. He batted a career-high .301 with a personal best on-base percentage of .349 in 299 plate appearances. Following an injury to Coco Crisp, Peña filled in at center field. On May 27, he was placed on the 15-day disabled list after surgery was required for an injured tendon in his left wrist. On July 18, Pena was activated from the disabled list. After platoon-mate Trot Nixon injured his biceps on July 30, Peña played more frequently in right field. The next day he fell a double short of hitting for the cycle in a 9–8 win over the Cleveland Indians. Pena hit .301 with 11 home runs in the 2006 season. The only action Peña saw in 2007 with the Red Sox was filling in for Crisp and J. D. Drew in center and right field. Peña hit a grand slam off closer Chris Ray of the Baltimore Orioles to help the Red Sox to a 5–2 victory on April 26. Throughout the season, Peña was rumored to be on the trading block, including a deal at the trade deadline that failed to go through.

=== Washington Nationals ===
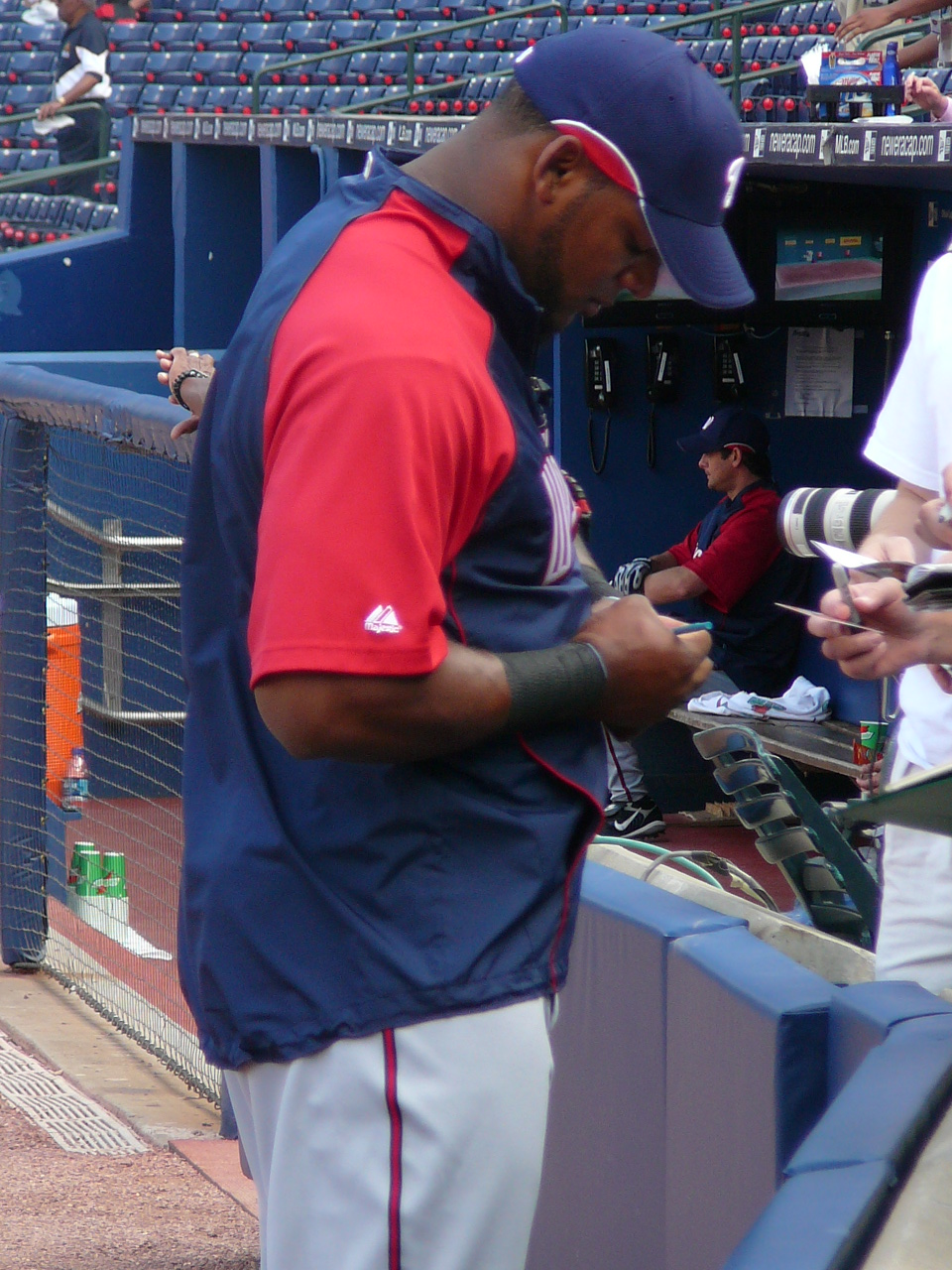
Peña signing autographs for fans at Turner Field in Atlanta as a member of the Nationals in 2008.

On August 17, Peña was traded to the Washington Nationals, with the Red Sox receiving 25-year-old first baseman Chris Carter and the Arizona Diamondbacks receiving Emiliano Fruto and cash considerations from Washington. Peña hit well for the Nationals, and finished 2007 with a cumulative 289 at-bats, 13 home runs and he batted .259 with a .319 on-base percentage and a .439 slugging percentage.

His $2.3 million signing bonus is now the third largest ever for an amateur free agent. In December 2007, he signed a one-year contract with the Nationals for $2 million with a mutual option for 2009 of $2 million.

On March 28, 2009, Peña was designated for assignment by the Nationals and placed on waivers. Peña went unclaimed and declined an assignment to the minor leagues so he was unconditionally released.

=== New York Mets ===
On April 20, 2009, Peña signed a minor league deal with the New York Mets and was assigned to Triple-A Buffalo. He was released on June 22, 2009.

=== Bridgeport Bluefish ===
On May 30, 2010, Pena began playing for the Bridgeport Bluefish, an independent team in the Atlantic League. In 38 games for Bridgeport, Peña hit .310 with 8 home runs and 38 runs batted in.

=== San Diego Padres ===
On July 19, 2010, Peña was signed to a minor league deal by the Padres and assigned to Triple-A Portland. During the offseason Wily played for the Tigres del Licey of the Dominican Winter League.

=== Arizona Diamondbacks ===
Peña signed a minor league contract with an invitation to spring training with the Arizona Diamondbacks prior to the 2011 season. As of mid-June, he was hitting .356 with 21 homers and 62 RBIs for the team's Triple-A affiliate in Reno. He was called up on June 21 and hit a home run that night in his first major league game in 3 years.

In a game against the Detroit Tigers on June 24, Pena launched a go-ahead homer that traveled an estimated 454 feet into the left-field seats at Comerica Park to give the Diamondbacks a 7–6 lead and the eventual victory.

Four days later, in a game at Chase Field with the Cleveland Indians tied at 4 in the bottom of the ninth inning and Ryan Roberts on third base, Peña powered a walk-off homer into the seats in left field giving the D-Backs a 6–4 win.

On July 15, Peña was designated for assignment. He was released on July 24.

=== Seattle Mariners ===
Pena signed a minor league contract with the Seattle Mariners on July 27, 2011. The Mariners purchased his contract on August 13. In his final major league action, he batted .209 with 2 home runs in 22 games. He elected free agency on October 30.

In 76 minor league games that year, Pena hit 25 home runs with 77 RBI, with a slash line of .358/.440/.712.

=== Fukuoka SoftBank Hawks ===
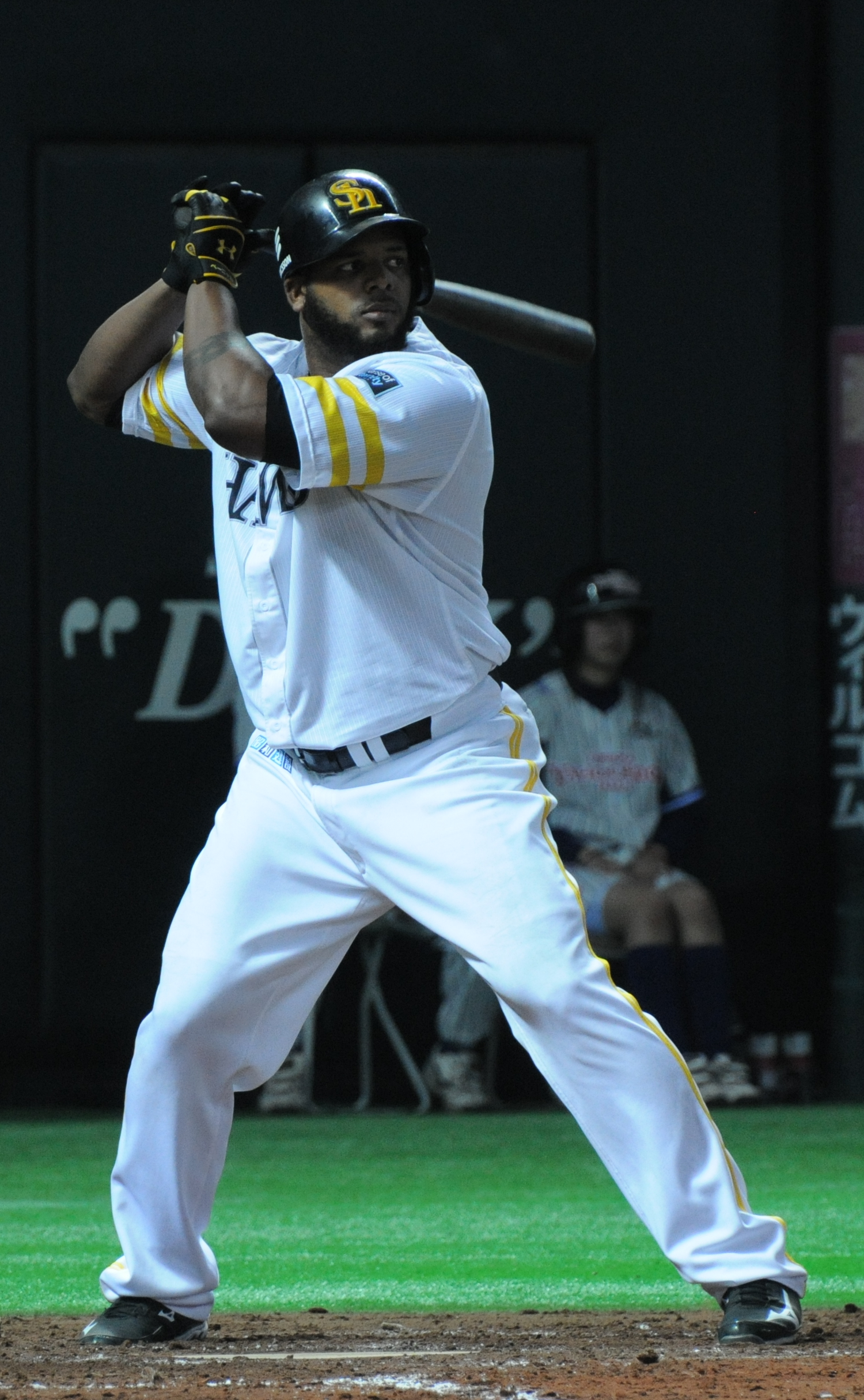
Peña with the Fukuoka SoftBank Hawks

On November 29, 2011, Pena signed a two-year contract with the Fukuoka SoftBank Hawks of the Nippon Professional Baseball (NPB). In 2012, he hit .280 with 21 home runs and 76 RBI in 130 games. In 2013, he hit .233 with 16 RBI and 1 home run in 55 games.

=== Orix Buffaloes ===
In 2014, he hit .255 with 32 homers and 90 RBIs in 140 games for the Orix Buffaloes of NPB.

=== Rakuten Golden Eagles ===
In 2015, Peña moved to the Tohoku Rakuten Golden Eagles of NPB where he hit .268 with 17 home runs.

=== Cleveland Indians ===
On February 6, 2017, Peña signed a minor league contract with the Cleveland Indians. The team released him at the end of spring training.

=== Chiba Lotte Marines ===
On June 6, 2017, Pena signed with the Chiba Lotte Marines of NPB. In 70 games in his final professional season, he batted .242 with 15 home runs in 70 games.

== Philanthropy ==
In 2007, Peña and his MoPeace Foundation teamed up with Joslin Diabetes Center's Latino Diabetes Initiative for the Beisbol y Salud Latino Diabetes and Health Festival to educate Latino men, women and children about type 2 diabetes. After his playing career, Peña volunteered his time to youth baseball in the Tampa, Florida area.
