= Sean Green (baseball) =

American baseball player (born 1979)

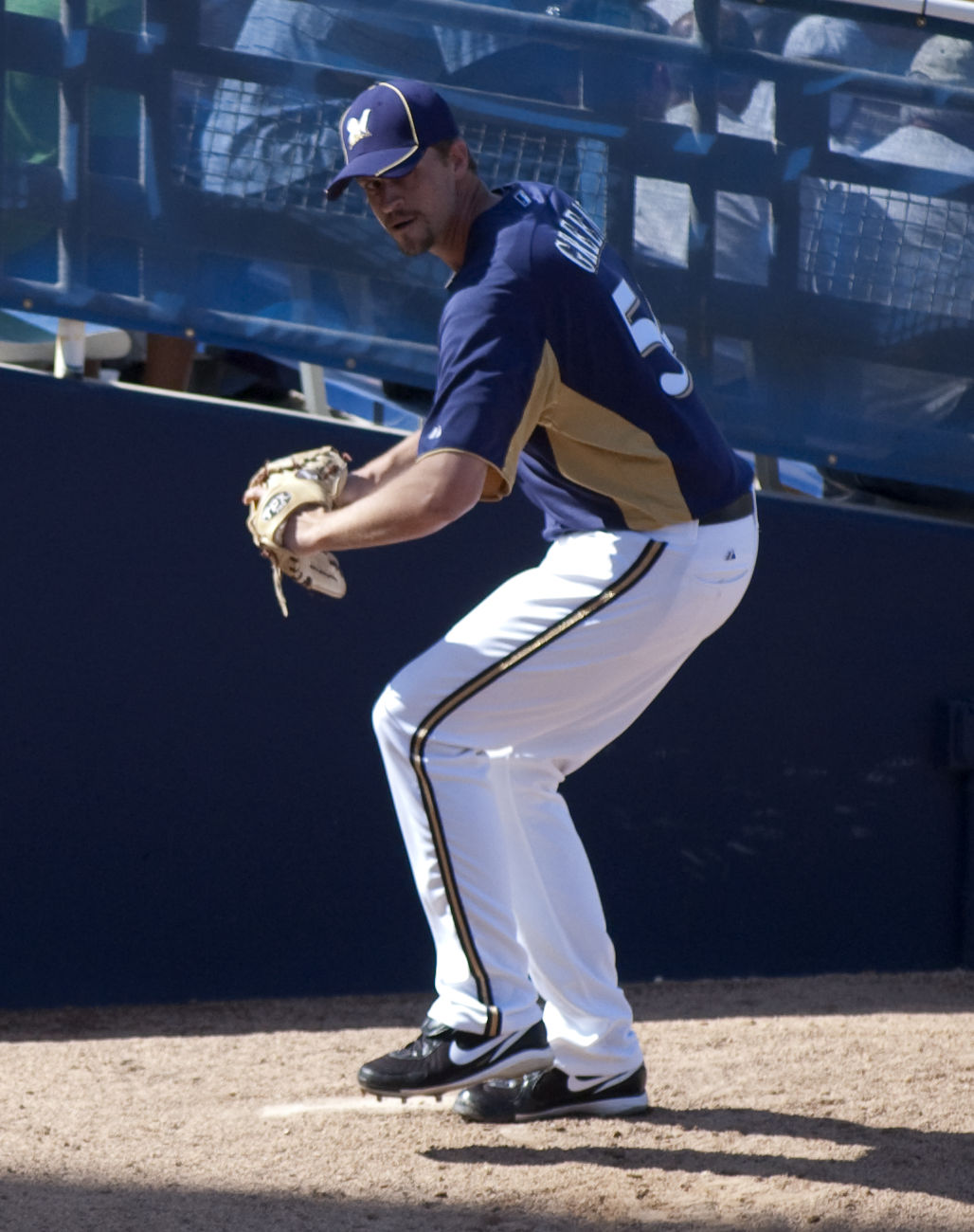
- Green pitching for Milwaukee in 2011.
- Pitcher
- Born: April 20, 1979 (age 47); Louisville, Kentucky, U.S.
- Batted: Right Threw: Right

MLB debut
- May 2, 2006, for the Seattle Mariners

Last MLB appearance
- May 4, 2011, for the Milwaukee Brewers

MLB statistics
- Win–loss record: 10–12
- Earned run average: 4.41
- Strikeouts: 203
- Stats at Baseball Reference

Teams
- Seattle Mariners (2006–2008); New York Mets (2009–2010); Milwaukee Brewers (2011)

Sean William Green (born April 20, 1979) is an American former professional baseball pitcher.

== Biography ==
Green grew up in east Louisville, Kentucky, in the Fincastle community.

Following his senior season at Louisville Male High School, Sean was selected by Toronto Blue Jays in 32nd round (959th overall) of the 1997 Major League Baseball draft, but elected to attend the University of Louisville instead. He played baseball for the Louisville Cardinals from 1998 to 2000. He was drafted in the 12th round of the 2000 Major League Baseball draft by the Colorado Rockies after his junior season at Louisville.

After spending his first professional season with the Portland Rockies of the Northwest League, the right-hander moved up the organizational ladder, pitching for the Asheville Tourists in the South Atlantic League in 2001, Salem in the Carolina League in 2002, and California League's Visalia Oaks before jumping to the Double-A Tulsa Drillers in 2004 where he was 4–3 with a 3.03 ERA.

In an off-season trade, the Seattle Mariners acquired Green from the Rockies for pitcher Aaron Taylor, and Green flourished in the Mariners farm system, logging a Texas League-high 14 saves and posting a 2.96 ERA for the San Antonio Missions in 2005 before being promoted to the Triple-A Tacoma Rainiers.

He completed the 2005 season in Tacoma and pitched in seven spring training games with the big league squad in Arizona before opening 2006 back in Tacoma. His spring training performance and 4–0 record and 1.38 ERA as the Rainiers' closer caught the eye of Mariners manager Mike Hargrove.

Green made it to the big leagues when the Seattle Mariners called him up on April 29, 2006, to replace reliever Julio Mateo. When Mateo was activated on May 20, it was thought that Green would return to Triple-A Tacoma, but the Mariners opted to instead send down pitcher Emiliano Fruto. He made his first Major League appearance on May 2 against the Minnesota Twins.

Green was a solid contributor out of the bullpen in 2007, logging 68 innings out of the bullpen with a 3.84 ERA in 64 games for the Mariners.

In 2008, Green dominated before the All-Star break, with a 2.72 ERA, but after the All-Star break, Green had an 8.65 ERA. He would finish the season with a 4.67 ERA in a career high 79 innings.

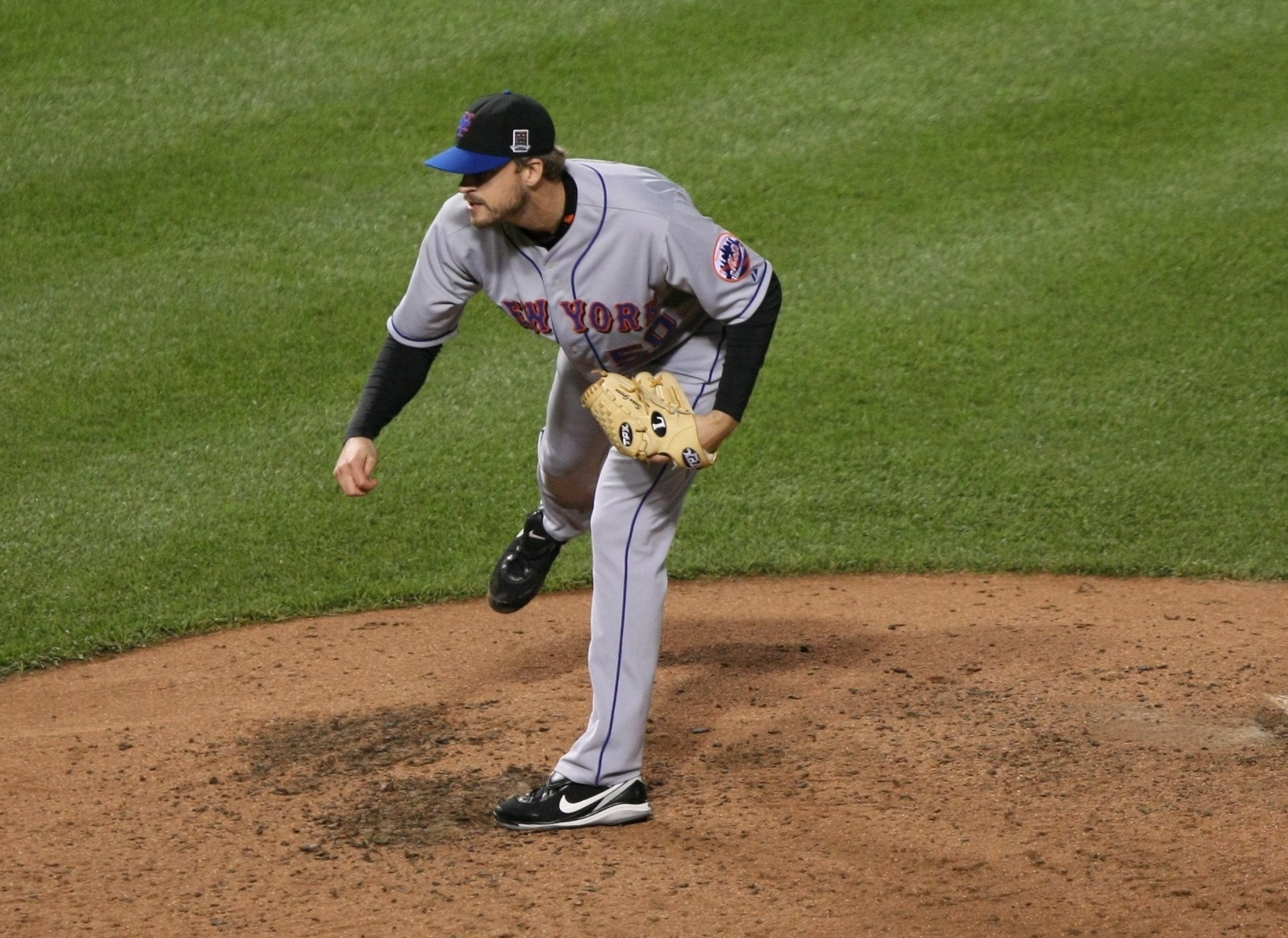
Green pitching for the New York Mets

=== New York Mets ===
On December 10, 2008, Green was sent to the New York Mets as a part of a 12-player, 3-team trade that sent reliever J.J. Putz to New York.

Despite hype for Green, he struggled in his first year and was eventually demoted to the Mets minor league, AAA affiliate. He would eventually make it back and provided the Mets with 79 relief appearances despite having an ERA of 4.52.

In early April 2010, Green was given the final bullpen spot but he was put on the DL with a broken rib. It was reported that Green has recovered from the injury but was still rehabilitating in the minors. Green returned to the Mets on September 6, 2010, as part of the Mets September callups. On December 3, 2010, the Mets non-tendered Green, making him a free agent.

=== Milwaukee Brewers ===
On December 22, 2010, Green signed a non-guaranteed one-year contract worth $875,000 with the Milwaukee Brewers. He was designated for assignment on May 17, 2011. He became a free agent following the season on November 2.

=== Texas Rangers ===
On January 10, 2012, Green signed a minor league contract with the Texas Rangers. He also received an invitation to spring training. Green allowed 21 runs in 27.1 innings at the AAA level for the Rangers, he was subsequently released on June 3.

=== Somerset Patriots ===
On July 3, 2012, Green signed with the Somerset Patriots of the Atlantic League of Professional Baseball. He retired on August 25. In 12 games (10 starts) he tossed 65 innings going 4–6 with a 4.15 ERA with 52 strikeouts also throwing 3 complete games and one shutout.
