= Emiliano Fruto =

Colombian baseball player (born 1984)

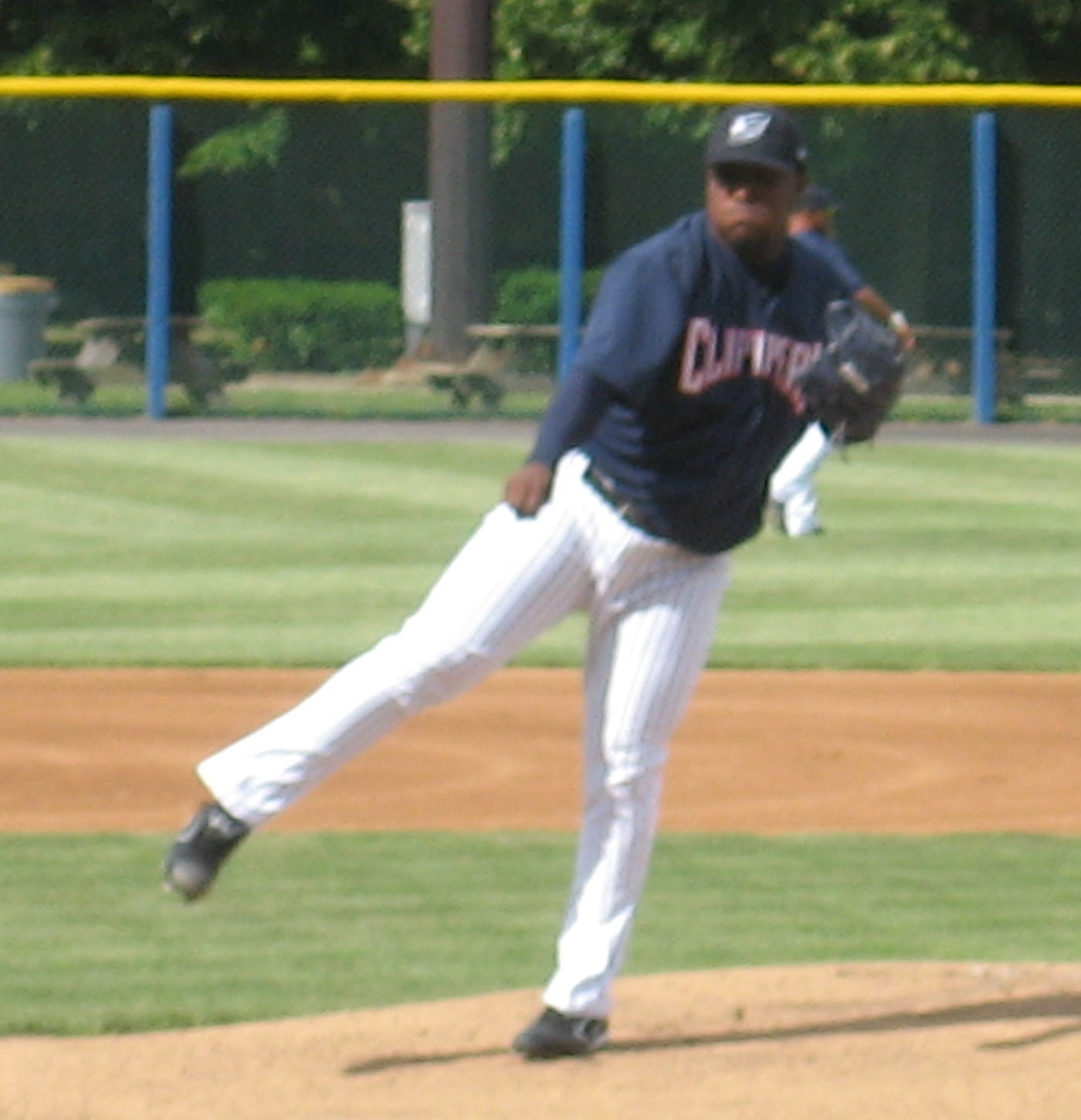
- Pitcher
- Born: June 6, 1984 (age 41); Bocagrande, Cartagena, Colombia
- Batted: Right Threw: Right

MLB debut
- May 14, 2006, for the Seattle Mariners

Last MLB appearance
- September 29, 2006, for the Seattle Mariners

MLB statistics
- Games pitched Win–loss record: 23; 2-2
- Earned run average Saves: 5.50; 1
- Strikeouts Walks: 34; 24
- Games finished Innings pitched: 6; 36
- Stats at Baseball Reference

Teams
- Seattle Mariners (2006)

Emiliano Ricardo Fruto [froo'-toh] (born June 6, 1984) is a Colombian former relief pitcher in Major League Baseball who played for the Seattle Mariners in its 2006 season. Listed at 6' 3" ft. [1.90 m.], 230 lb. [107 k.], Fruto batted and threw right handed. He was born in Bocagrande, Cartagena.

The Washington Nationals acquired Fruto along with outfielder Chris Snelling as part of a deal that sent longtime Expos and Nationals second baseman José Vidro to the Mariners. The transaction was announced on December 13, 2006, and completed after Vidro passed his physical examination.

In 2007, Fruto joined the starting rotation of the Triple-A Columbus Clippers, although he had been employed primarily as a reliever in past seasons. In his first start, against the Louisville Bats on April 10, he pitched six hitless innings, striking out five batters and walking one. At midseason, he was selected to the All-Star Futures Game.

On August 20, 2007, Fruto was sent to the Arizona Diamondbacks in exchange for Minor League first baseman, Chris Carter, who was subsequently traded to the Boston Red Sox to complete an earlier trade for Wily Mo Peña. Fruto became a free agent at the end of the 2008 season and signed a Minor League contract with an invitation to spring training with the Atlanta Braves in January 2009. He was later released.

Fruto spent 2009 and 2010 in the Golden Baseball League, while pitching for the Tucson Toros and Yuma Scorpions. A two-time All-Star in the league, he went a combined 5-8 with a 2.66 ERA in 76 appearances with 38 saves, striking out 126 over 88 innings.

He began the 2011 season with the Sioux City Explorers of the American Association. He left the team on June 9 to play for the Olmecas de Tabasco of the Mexican League, where he pitched in 20 games before returning to Sioux City in July. In a combined 41 appearances, Fruto went 2-3 with a 3.28 ERA with 22 saves, striking out 67 over 49.1 innings.

In between, Fruto played winter ball with the Cardenales de Lara club of the Venezuelan Professional Baseball League in the 2005–06 and 2006-07 seasons, and for the Algodoneros de Guasave of the Mexican Pacific League in the 2007-08 campaign.

After not playing professionally in 2012, Fruto returned in 2013 with the Bridgeport Bluefish of the Atlantic League.
