= Jake Woods =

American baseball player (born 1981)

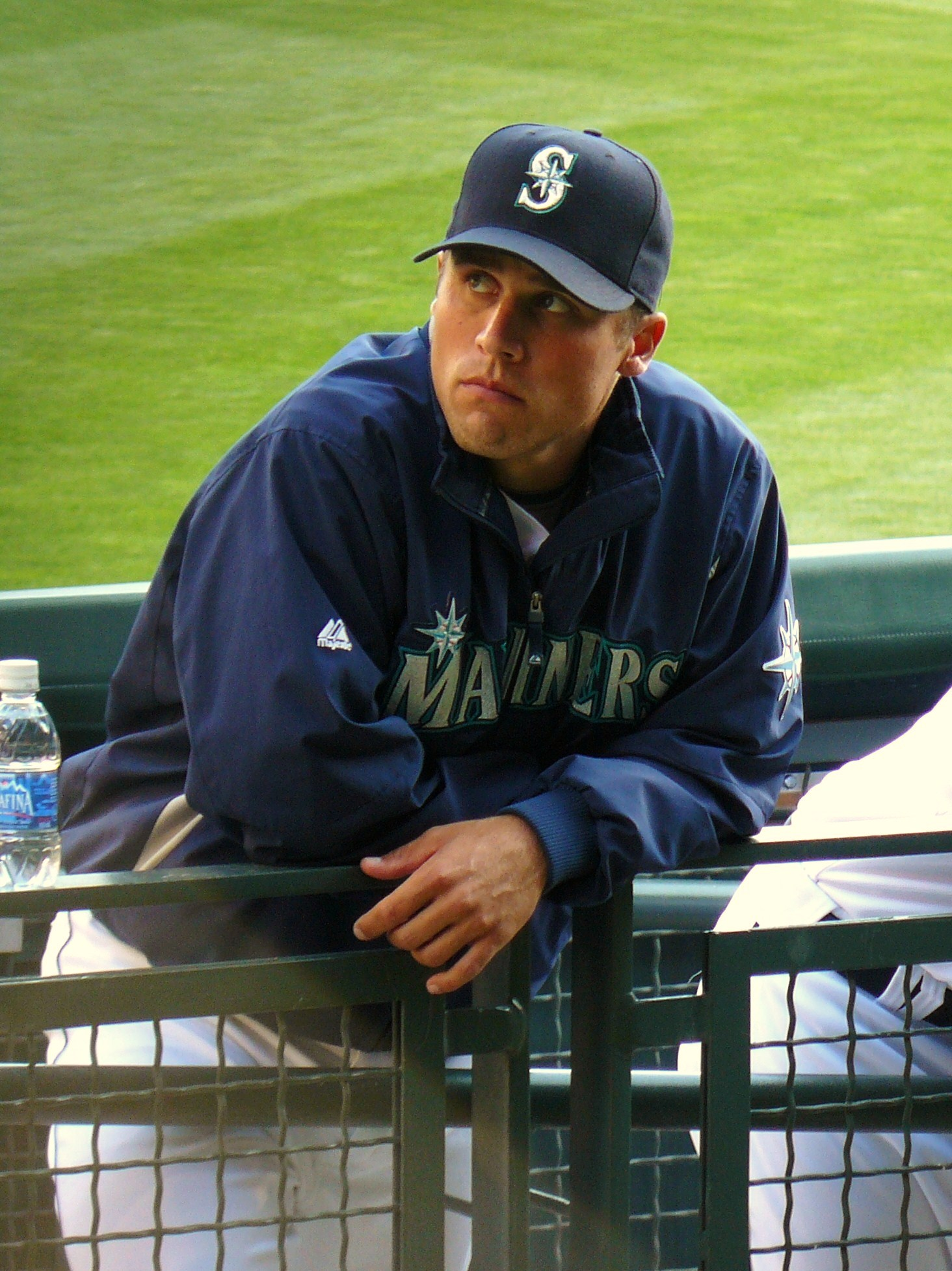
- Pitcher
- Born: September 3, 1981 (age 45); Fresno, California, U.S.
- Batted: Left Threw: Left

MLB debut
- April 8, 2005, for the Los Angeles Angels

Last MLB appearance
- September 18, 2008, for the Seattle Mariners

MLB statistics
- Win–loss record: 8–5
- Earned run average: 4.60
- Strikeouts: 99
- Stats at Baseball Reference

Teams
- Los Angeles Angels of Anaheim (2005); Seattle Mariners (2006–2008)

Jacob Thomas Woods (born September 3, 1981) is an American former professional baseball pitcher. He played in Major League Baseball (MLB) from 2005 to 2008. He threw and batted left-handed.

Woods attended Bakersfield College, a junior college, and set a program record with 121 strikeouts in 2001, surpassing former teammate Phil Dumatrait. The Los Angeles Angels of Anaheim selected Woods in the third round (89th overall) of the 2001 MLB draft. He signed for a $442,500 signing bonus. He led the Pioneer League in strikeouts that summer. He played for the Cedar Rapids Kernels in 2002, going 10–5 with a 3.05 earned run average (ERA) and 121 strikeouts in 27 games pitched. He was selected for the Texas League All-Star Game in 2004. Woods was a starting pitcher in the minors before converting to a reliever in the majors. He made his MLB debut in April 2005 for the Angels, with a 1–1 record with a 4.55 ERA in 28 2/3 innings. He was sent down to the minors in July.

The Seattle Mariners claimed Woods off waivers on December 20, 2005. He spent his only full season in MLB in 2006. Beginning the year as a long reliever, Woods moved into the starting rotation in August. He spent only two weeks in the majors in 2007. Woods spent most of 2008 with Triple-A Tacoma but was called up in August. He became a free agent after the season.

In January 2009, Woods signed a minor league contract with the Philadelphia Phillies. After pitching in Triple-A Lehigh Valley for just over a full season, Woods was released on April 18, 2010. The next month, he signed with Brother Elephants in Taiwan to finish his professional career.

Woods and his wife have a child. He resides in Kingsburg, California.
