= Travis Chick =

American baseball player

- Pitcher
- Born: June 10, 1984 (age 42); Irving, Texas, U.S.
- Batted: Right Threw: Right

MLB debut
- September 13, 2006, for the Seattle Mariners

Last MLB appearance
- September 25, 2006, for the Seattle Mariners

MLB statistics
- Win–loss record: 0–0
- Earned run average: 12.60
- Strikeouts: 2
- Stats at Baseball Reference

Teams
- Seattle Mariners (2006)

Travis Cole Chick (born June 10, 1984) is an American former professional baseball pitcher. He played in Major League Baseball (MLB) for the Seattle Mariners.

== Playing career ==
Chick was drafted by the Florida Marlins in the 14th round of the 2002 Major League Baseball draft. After two seasons in the low minors, he was traded to the San Diego Padres, who subsequently traded Chick and Justin Germano to the Cincinnati Reds for Joe Randa on July 23, 2005. On July 6, 2006, he was again traded, this time to the Seattle Mariners for pitcher Eddie Guardado and cash considerations.

The Mariners assigned Chick to the Double-A San Antonio Missions. He was called up to the Mariners in September and made his major league debut on September 13, 2006. He appeared in three games for the Mariners and returned to the minors for the next two seasons. He became a free agent at the end of the 2008 season and signed a minor league contract with the Los Angeles Dodgers.

For the 2010 season, Chick signed with the Camden Riversharks of the independent Atlantic League. The Riversharks placed Chick on the inactive list July 16, 2010. Chick finished his stint with Camden with a 5–4 record and a 4.40 ERA while seeing action as both a starter and reliever. On July 27, 2010, Chick was signed by the Pittsburgh Pirates and was sent to their Class AAA affiliate, the Indianapolis Indians. Chick was soon traded to the Texas Rangers on August 13, 2010, for a PTBNL or cash. Chick retired in 2010.

== Post-playing career ==
Chick earned a Bachelor of Business Administration from the University of Texas at Tyler and began working as a financial advisor in 2014. He has also coached baseball at Brook Hill School and Tyler Junior College.
