= Julio Mateo =

Dominican baseball player (born 1977)

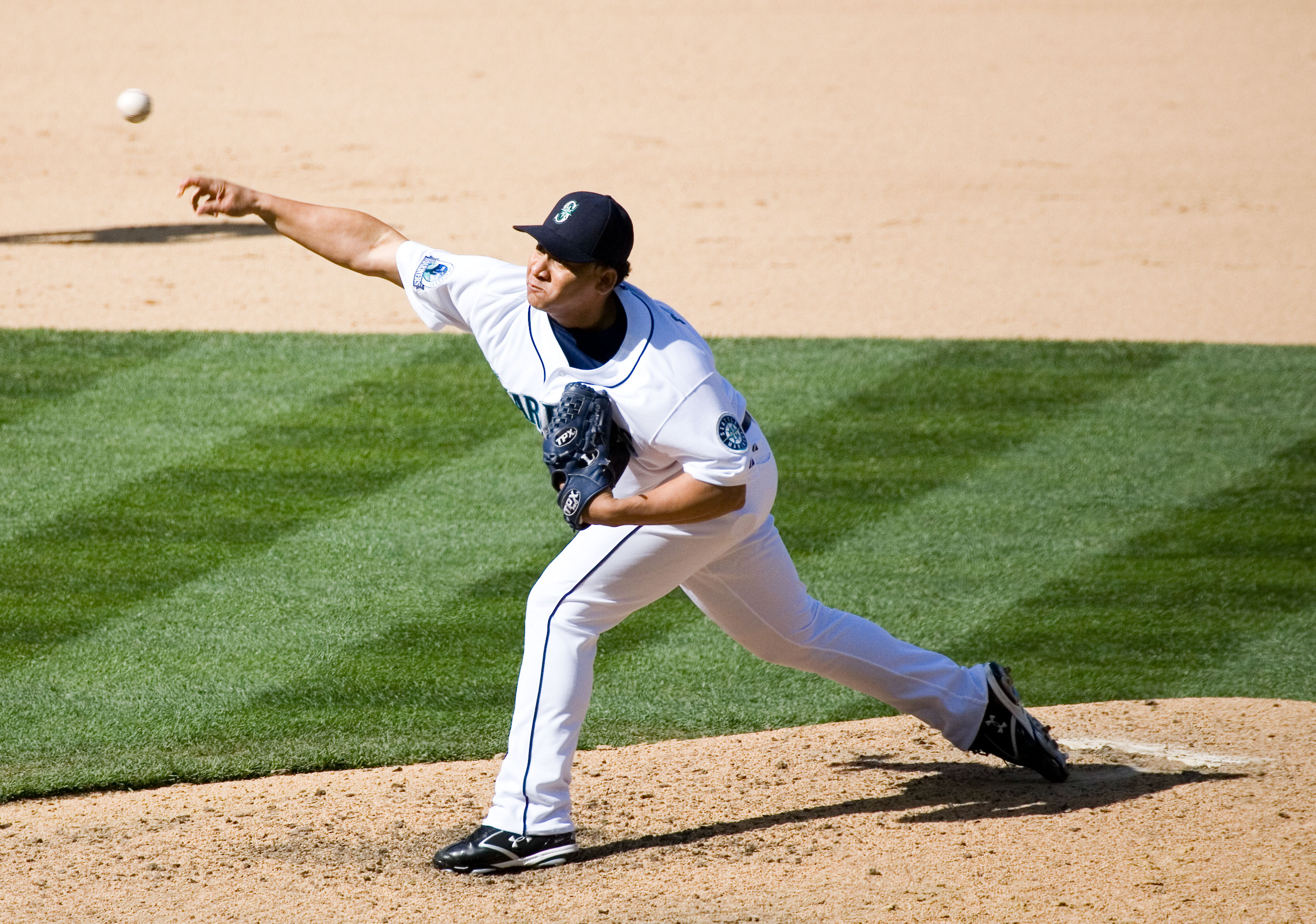
- Pitcher
- Born: August 2, 1977 (age 49); Baní, Dominican Republic
- Batted: Right Threw: Right

MLB debut
- May 7, 2002, for the Seattle Mariners

Last MLB appearance
- May 3, 2007, for the Seattle Mariners

MLB statistics
- Win–loss record: 18–12
- Earned run average: 3.68
- Strikeouts: 216
- Stats at Baseball Reference

Teams
- Seattle Mariners (2002–2007)

Julio Cesar Mateo (born August 2, 1977) is a Dominican professional baseball pitcher. The 6’0 tall 220 lb Mateo bats and throws right-handed. He was signed by the Seattle Mariners as a non-drafted free agent on May 15, 1996.

== Professional career ==
=== Seattle Mariners ===
Mateo went 4–2 with a 1.74 ERA in 15 games, including two starts, for Dominican Summer League Mariners in 1996. He tossed two complete games and earned one save.

In 1997 Mateo went 3–1 with a 3.30 ERA in 13 outings, including six starts, for Arizona League Mariners.

With the Short-Season Everett AquaSox in 1998, Mateo went 3–3 with a 4.70 ERA and four saves in 28 relief appearances. He also allowed one run over 1 1/3 innings in his lone outing for the Class-A Advanced Lancaster JetHawks.

Mateo went 1–3 with a 4.34 ERA and four saves in 20 outings for the Class-A Wisconsin Timber Rattlers in 1999.

Again with Class-A Wisconsin in 2000, Mateo went 4–8 with a 4.19 ERA and four saves in 36 outings, including one start.

He went 5–4 with a 2.86 ERA and a career-high 26 saves in 56 outings for the Class-A Advanced San Bernardino Stampede in 2001.

Mateo split the 2002 season between the Double-A San Antonio Missions, the Triple-A Tacoma Rainiers, and the Major League Mariners. He went 1–0 with an 0.52 ERA in 12 outings for San Antonio and 4–2 with a 4.06 ERA and six saves in 20 appearances for Tacoma. ... He made his Major League Baseball debut on May 7, 2002, for the Mariners against the Toronto Blue Jays. Mateo gave up 10 runs in 21 innings during his first taste of Major League action with Seattle.

In 2003 Mateo went 4–0 with a 3.15 ERA and a save in 50 relief outings for Mariners. He finished 17 games for Seattle in '03.

Mateo retained his bullpen spot with the Mariners in 2004. He went 1–2 with a 4.68 ERA and one save in 45 outings for M's.

In 2005 Mateo went 3–6 with a 3.06 ERA in 55 appearances, including one start, for the Mariners.

He went 9–4 with a 4.19 ERA in 48 relief appearances for Mariners in 2006. He recorded a career high in wins. On August 28, Mateo broke his fourth metacarpal (ring finger) on his left hand while lifting weights., and missed the remainder of the '06 season.

Mateo posted a 1–0 mark with a 3.75 ERA in nine appearances for the Mariners before his domestic violence charge. Soon after that he was optioned to Triple-A Tacoma.

=== Philadelphia Phillies ===
On July 31, 2007, Mateo was traded to the Philadelphia Phillies for minor league shortstop Jesus Merchan. He went 4–1 with a 1.43 ERA 15 saves in 35 relief outings for both the Double-A Reading Phillies and the Rainiers in the Mariners' organization. On December 7, he was given unconditional release by the Phillies.

=== San Francisco Giants ===
On January 10, 2008, Mateo signed a minor league contract with the San Francisco Giants. He went 3–4 with a 5.69 ERA in 25 outings, including six starts, for the Triple-A Fresno Grizzlies. He lost his first three starts before allowing two runs over 5 2/3 innings in victory over the Tucson Sidewinders on April 20. He converted three consecutive save opportunities from May 22–29. He became a free agent at the end of the '08 season.

=== Mexico City Red Devils ===
Mateo played the 2009 season with the Diablos Rojos del México of the Mexican League. He went 12–5 in 123 2/3 innings with a 5.24 ERA and 70 strikeouts in 22 games, 21 starts.

== Personal life ==
Mateo has one son, Julio Mateo Jr. He left spring training in 2006, after learning his older brother, Luis, had died in an automobile accident in the Dominican Republic.

=== Criminal charges ===
On May 5, 2007, Mateo turned himself in under the charges of abuse to his wife. He was arrested on a charge of third-degree assault. The police report said the incident involved him striking, choking and biting his wife. She needed five stitches on her lip, as a result of a bite police say was inflicted by Mateo. Mateo was optioned to Triple-A Tacoma immediately after the event and faced a 10-day non-pay suspension as well as a fine for not showing up to the ballpark for the game that night against the New York Yankees.

While pitching in San Francisco's farm system, Mateo was arrested on July 27, 2008, in Albuquerque, New Mexico. The arrest followed the discovery of counterfeit $100 bills in his hotel room. He also faced the accusation of passing a counterfeit $100 bill to pay a cab fare. A police report says that as officers patted Mateo down in a hotel hallway early Sunday, he made a statement in Spanish denying the charges.
