= 2006 Boston Red Sox season =

Major League Baseball season

2006 Boston Red Sox
- League: American League
- Division: East
- Ballpark: Fenway Park
- City: Boston
- Record: 86–76 (.531)
- Divisional place: 3rd
- Owners: John W. Henry (New England Sports Ventures)
- President: Larry Lucchino
- General manager: Theo Epstein
- Manager: Terry Francona
- Television: NESN (Don Orsillo, Jerry Remy)
- Radio: WEEI (Jerry Trupiano, Joe Castiglione); WROL
- Stats: ESPN.com; Baseball Reference

The 2006 Boston Red Sox season was the 106th season in the franchise's Major League Baseball history. The Red Sox finished third in the American League East with a record of 86 wins and 76 losses, 11 games behind the New York Yankees. The Red Sox failed to qualify for the playoffs for the first time since 2002. It was also the first time that the Red Sox finished lower than second in the American League East since 1997.

== Offseason ==
- November 24, 2005: Shortstop Hanley Ramírez was traded by the Boston Red Sox along with pitchers Jesús Delgado (minors), Harvey García and Aníbal Sánchez to the Florida Marlins, in exchange for P Josh Beckett, 3B Mike Lowell and P Guillermo Mota.
- December 8, 2005: Édgar Rentería was traded by the Boston Red Sox with cash to the Atlanta Braves for Andy Marte.
- February 1, 2006: Free agent catcher Ken Huckaby was signed by Boston.

== Regular season ==
=== Transactions ===
- January 27, 2006: The Red Sox sent Guillermo Mota, Andy Marte, Kelly Shoppach, a player to be named later (Randy Newson, July 21) and cash to the Indians, in exchange for Coco Crisp, David Riske, and Josh Bard.
- March 30, 2006: Charles Johnson and Chris Narveson were obtained by Boston from the Rockies for Byung-hyun Kim and cash consideration. Johnson was released the same day.
- May 1, 2006: Doug Mirabelli was acquired by the Red Sox from the Padres in exchange for Josh Bard, Cla Meredith and cash.
- June 21, 2006: Jason Johnson was purchased by the Red Sox from the Indians.
- August 4: Javy López was purchased by Boston from the Orioles.
- August 16, 2006: Carlos Peña signed as a free agent with the Red Sox.
- August 17, 2006: Eric Hinske was purchased by the Red Sox from the Blue Jays.
- August 28, 2006: Jason Johnson was released by the Red Sox.
- September 8, 2006: Javy López was released by the Red Sox.

=== Season summary ===
The Boston Red Sox finished eleven games behind the first place team in the American League East, the New York Yankees. While part of the blame for the Red Sox's demise could be the five-game sweep at the hands of the New York Yankees from August 18 – 21, the team had a poor record the entire month of August (going just 9-21) and September (13–14). Also, they suffered extensive injuries to Jason Varitek, Manny Ramirez, Jonathan Papelbon, Jon Lester, and Keith Foulke.

=== Season standings ===
AL East
Team	W	L	Pct.	GB	Home	Road
New York Yankees	97	65	.599	—	50‍–‍31	47‍–‍34
Toronto Blue Jays	87	75	.537	10	50‍–‍31	37‍–‍44
Boston Red Sox	86	76	.531	11	48‍–‍33	38‍–‍43
Baltimore Orioles	70	92	.432	27	40‍–‍41	30‍–‍51
Tampa Bay Devil Rays	61	101	.377	36	41‍–‍40	20‍–‍61

=== Record vs. opponents ===
2006 American League record Source: MLB Standings Grid – 2006
Team	BAL	BOS	CWS	CLE	DET	KC	LAA	MIN	NYY	OAK	SEA	TB	TEX	TOR	NL
Baltimore	—	3–15	2–5	4–2	3–3	5–1	4–6	3–6	7–12	2–4	4–6	13–6	3–6	8–11	9–9
Boston	15–3	—	4–2	3–4	3–3	4–5	3–3	1–5	8–11	3–7	4–6	10–9	5–4	7–12	16–2
Chicago	5–2	2–4	—	8–11	12–7	11–8	6–3	9–10	2–4	3–3	5–4	3–3	5–5	5–4	14–4
Cleveland	2–4	4–3	11–8	—	6–13	10–8	4–5	8–11	3–4	3–6	4–5	6–1	5–4	4–2	8–10
Detroit	3–3	3–3	7–12	13–6	—	14–4	3–5	11–8	2–5	5–4	6–3	5–3	5–5	3–3	15–3
Kansas City	1–5	5–4	8–11	8–10	4–14	—	3–7	7–12	2–7	4–5	3–5	1–5	3–3	3–4	10–8
Los Angeles	6–4	3–3	3–6	5–4	5–3	7–3	—	4–2	6–4	11–8	10–9	7–2	11–8	4–6	7–11
Minnesota	6–3	5–1	10–9	11–8	8–11	12–7	2–4	—	3–3	6–4	5–3	6–1	4–5	2–5	16–2
New York	12–7	11–8	4–2	4–3	5–2	7–2	4–6	3–3	—	3–6	3–3	13–5	8–2	10–8	10–8
Oakland	4–2	7–3	3–3	6–3	4–5	5–4	8–11	4–6	6–3	—	17–2	6–3	9–10	6–4	8–10
Seattle	6–4	6–4	4–5	5–4	3–6	5–3	9–10	3–5	3–3	2–17	—	6–3	8–11	4–5	14–4
Tampa Bay	6–13	9–10	3–3	1–6	3–5	5–1	2–7	1–6	5–13	3–6	3–6	—	3–6	6–12	11–7
Texas	6–3	4–5	5–5	4–5	5–5	3–3	8–11	5–4	2–8	10–9	11–8	6–3	—	4–2	7–11
Toronto	11–8	12–7	4–5	2–4	3–3	4–3	6–4	5–2	8–10	4–6	5–4	12–6	2–4	—	9–9

Red Sox vs. National League East
Team	ATL	FLA	NYM	PHI	WSH
Boston	3–0	2–1	3–0	5–1	3–0

=== Opening Day lineup ===
10	Coco Crisp	CF
3	Mark Loretta	2B
34	David Ortiz	DH
24	Manny Ramirez	LF
7	Trot Nixon	RF
33	Jason Varitek	C
25	Mike Lowell	3B
20	Kevin Youkilis	1B
11	Álex González	SS
38	Curt Schilling	P

=== Roster ===
2006 Boston Red Sox
Roster
Pitchers: 59 Abe Alvarez; 19 Josh Beckett; 54 Craig Breslow; 59 Mike Burns; 30 Matt Clement; 63 Bryan Corey; 57 Manny Delcarmen; 55 Lenny DiNardo; 29 Keith Foulke; 61 Kason Gabbard; 68 Devern Hansack; 56 Craig Hansen; 43 Mike Holtz; 39 Kevin Jarvis; 18 Jason Johnson; 62 Jon Lester; 48 Javier López; 58 Jonathan Papelbon; 60 David Pauley; 54 David Riske; 38 Curt Schilling; 37 Rudy Seánez; 52 Kyle Snyder; 51 Julián Tavárez; 50 Mike Timlin; 46 Jermaine Van Buren; 49 Tim Wakefield; 16 David Wells	Catchers: 77 Josh Bard; 40 Ken Huckaby; 23 Javy López; 36 Corky Miller; 28 Doug Mirabelli; 33 Jason Varitek; Infielders: 23,13 Alex Cora; 11 Álex González; 3 Mark Loretta; 25 Mike Lowell; 64 Dustin Pedroia; 37 Carlos Peña; 84 J. T. Snow; 20 Kevin Youkilis	Outfielders: 10 Coco Crisp; 2 Willie Harris; 12 Eric Hinske; 44 Gabe Kapler; 18 Dustan Mohr; 60 David Murphy; 7 Trot Nixon; 22 Wily Mo Peña; 24 Manny Ramírez; 39 Adam Stern; Designated hitter: 34 David Ortiz	Manager: 47 Terry Francona; Coaches: 32 Bill Haselman (first base); 35 DeMarlo Hale (third base); 15 Ron Jackson (hitting); 31 Brad Mills (bench); 41 Al Nipper (bullpen; interim pitching); 53 Ralph Treuel (interim bullpen); 17 Dave Wallace (pitching)

=== Game log ===
2006 game log
April (14–11)

#	Date	Opponent	Score	Win	Loss	Save	Attendance	Record
1	April 3	@ Rangers	7–3	Schilling (1–0)	Millwood (0–1)		51,541	1–0
2	April 4	@ Rangers	10–4	Padilla (1–0)	Wakefield (0–1)		29,442	1–1
3	April 5	@ Rangers	2–1	Beckett (1–0)	Loe (0–1)	Papelbon (1)	32,416	2–1
4	April 7	@ Orioles	14–8	Clement (1–0)	Cabrera (0–1)		37,063	3–1
5	April 8	@ Orioles	2–1	Schilling (2–0)	Chen (0–1)	Papelbon (2)	41,166	4–1
6	April 9	@ Orioles	4–1	Wakefield (1–1)	López (1–1)	Papelbon (3)	37,998	5–1
7	April 11	Blue Jays	6–1	Beckett (2–0)	Towers (0–2)	Papelbon (4)	35,491	6–1
8	April 12	Blue Jays	8–4	Chacín (2–0)	Wells (0–1)		36,378	6–2
9	April 13	Blue Jays	8–6	Lilly (1–0)	Clement (1–1)	Ryan (3)	36,524	6–3
10	April 14	Mariners	2–1	Schilling (3–0)	Moyer (0–2)	Papelbon (5)	36,431	7–3
11	April 15	Mariners	3–0	Piñeiro (2–1)	Wakefield (1–2)	Guardado (2)	36,047	7–4
12	April 16	Mariners	3–2	Beckett (3–0)	Washburn (1–2)	Papelbon (6)	36,181	8–4
13	April 17	Mariners	7–6	Timlin (1–0)	Guardado (0–1)		36,188	9–4
14	April 18	Devil Rays	7–4	Timlin (2–0)	Lugo (0–1)	Papelbon (7)	36,423	10–4
15	April 19	Devil Rays	9–1	Schilling (4–0)	Waechter (0–1)		36,454	11–4
16	April 20	Devil Rays	5–1	Kazmir (2–1)	Wakefield (1–3)	Miceli (4)	36,607	11–5
17	April 21	@ Blue Jays	7–6	Speier (1–0)	Foulke (0–1)		28,333	11–6
18	April 22	@ Blue Jays	8–1	Halladay (2–1)	DiNardo (0–1)	Walker (1)	34,387	11–7
19	April 23	@ Blue Jays	6–3	Clement (2–1)	Towers (0–4)	Papelbon (8)	28,737	12–7
20	April 25	@ Indians	8–6	Foulke (1–1)	Mota (0–1)	Papelbon (9)	18,438	13–7
21	April 26	@ Indians	7–1	Lee (2–1)	Wakefield (1–4)		21,575	13–8
22	April 27	@ Indians	15–3	Byrd (3–2)	Beckett (3–1)		26,952	13–9
23	April 28	@ Devil Rays	5–2	Fossum (1–1)	Clement (2–2)	Walker (1)	22,565	13–10
24	April 29	@ Devil Rays	9–6	Foulke (2–1)	Walker (0–1)	Papelbon (10)	27,415	14–10
25	April 30	@ Devil Rays	5–4	Kazmir (3–2)	Schilling (4–1)	Camp (3)	26,690	14–11

May (17–9)

#	Date	Opponent	Score	Win	Loss	Save	Attendance	Record
26	May 1	Yankees	7–3	Timlin (3–0)	Small (0–1)		36,339	15–11
–	May 2	Yankees	Postponed (rain)					15–11
27	May 3	Blue Jays	7–6	McGowan (1–0)	Papelbon (0–1)	Ryan (6)	35,881	15–12
28	May 4	Blue Jays	7–4	Clement (3–2)	Towers (0–6)	Papelbon (11)	36,396	16–12
29	May 5	Orioles	6–3	Schilling (5–1)	López (1–4)	Papelbon (12)	36,515	17–12
30	May 6	Orioles	9–3	Wakefield (2–4)	Bédard (4–2)		36,507	18–12
31	May 7	Orioles	10–3	DiNardo (1–1)	Benson (4–3)		36,022	19–12
32	May 9	@Yankees	14–3	Beckett (4–1)	Johnson (5–3)		54,688	20–12
33	May 10	@ Yankees	7–3	Mussina (6–1)	Schilling (5–2)		54,769	20–13
34	May 11	@ Yankees	5–3	Wakefield (3–4)	Villone (0–1)	Papelbon (13)	54,956	21–13
35	May 12	Rangers	6–0	Loe (2–3)	Clement (3–3)		36,102	21–14
–	May 13	Rangers	Postponed (rain)					21–14
–	May 14	Rangers	Postponed (rain)					21–14
36	May 15	@ Orioles	11–1	Beckett (5–1)	López (1–6)		25,607	22–14
37	May 16	@ Orioles	6–5	Schilling (6–2)	Williams (1–1)	Papelbon (14)	27,565	23–14
38	May 17	@ Orioles	4–3	Bédard (5–2)	Wakefield (3–5)	Ray (10)	32,089	23–15
39	May 19	@ Phillies	5–3	Clement (4–3)	Lieber (3–5)	Papelbon (15)	44,296	24–15
40	May 20	@ Phillies	8–4	Beckett (6–1)	Myers (2–2)		44,809	25–15
41	May 21	@ Phillies	10–5	Lidle (4–4)	DiNardo (1–2)		44,738	25–16
42	May 22	Yankees	9–5	Schilling (7–2)	Wang (4–2)		36,342	26–16
43	May 23	Yankees	7–5	Wright (2–3)	Wakefield (3–6)	Rivera (9)	36,290	26–17
44	May 24	Yankees	8–6	Johnson (6–4)	Clement (4–4)	Rivera (10)	36,375	26–18
45	May 25	Devil Rays	4–1	Beckett (7–1)	Waechter (0–3)	Papelbon (16)	36209	27–18
46	May 26	Devil Rays	8–4	Tavárez (1–0)	Kazmir (7–3)	Papelbon (17)	36,129	28–18
47	May 27	Devil Rays	6–4	Schilling (8–2)	McClung (2–6)	Papelbon (18)	36,409	29–18
48	May 28	Devil Rays	5–4	Wakefield (4–6)	Hendrickson (3–5)	Tavárez (1)	36,015	30–18
49	May 29	@ Blue Jays	7–6	Ryan (1–0)	Riske (0–1)		24,038	30–19
50	May 30	@ Blue Jays	8–5	Chacín (6–1)	Beckett (7–2)	Ryan (12)	27,324	30–20
51	May 31	@ Blue Jays	8–6	Van Buren (1–0)	Lilly (5–5)	Papelbon (19)	24,526	31–20

June (17–9)

#	Date	Opponent	Score	Win	Loss	Save	Attendance	Record
52	June 2	@ Tigers	3–2	Seánez (1–0)	Jones (0–3)	Papelbon (20)	35,531	32–20
53	June 3	@ Tigers	6–2	Bonderman (6–4)	Wakefield (4–7)	Rodney (7)	40,872	32–21
54	June 4	@ Tigers	8–3	Clement (5–4)	Miner (0–1)		35,764	33–21
55	June 5	@ Yankees	13–5	Mussina (8–1)	Beckett (7–3)		55,246	33–22
56	June 6	@ Yankees	2–1	Wang (6–2)	Pauley (0–1)	Rivera (12)	55,141	33–23
–	June 7	@ Yankees	Postponed (rain)					33–23
57	June 8	@ Yankees	9–3	Schilling (9–2)	Wright (3–4)		55,225	34–23
58	June 9	Rangers	4–3	Papelbon (1–1)	Cordero (5–4)		36,133	35–23
59	June 10	Rangers	7–4	Corey (1–0)	Tavárez (1–1)	Otsuka (11)	36,920	35–24
–	June 10	Rangers	Postponed (rain)					35–24
60	June 11	Rangers	5–4	Delcarmen (1–0)	Otsuka (2–2)		36,232	36–24
61	June 11	Rangers	13–6	Wasdin (1–0)	Pauley (0–2)		35,602	36–25
62	June 13	@ Twins	5–2	Reyes (1–0)	Tavárez (1–2)		23,531	36–26
63	June 14	@ Twins	8–1	Radke (5–7)	Clement (5–5)		26,492	36–27
64	June 15	@ Twins	5–3	Silva (3–8)	Wakefield (4–8)	Nathan (8)	21,191	36–28
65	June 16	@ Braves	4–1	Lester (1–0)	Hudson (6–5)	Papelbon (21)	51,038	37–28
66	June 17	@ Braves	5–3	Beckett (8–3)	Cormier (2–2)	Papelbon (22)	49,364	38–28
67	June 18	@ Braves	10–7	Seánez (2–0)	McBride (1–1)	Papelbon (23)	48,826	39–28
68	June 19	Nationals	6–3	Snyder (1–0)	Armas (6–4)	Timlin (1)	36,252	40–28
69	June 20	Nationals	11–3	Wakefield (5–8)	Hernández (5–8)		36,421	41–28
70	June 21	Nationals	9–3	Lester (2–0)	Hill (1–2)		36,464	42–28
71	June 23	Phillies	10–2	Beckett (9–3)	Madson (7–5)		35,948	43–28
72	June 24	Phillies	5–3	Papelbon (2–1)	Gordon (2–3)		35,564	44–28
–	June 25	Phillies	Postponed (rain)					44–28
73	June 26	Phillies	8–7	Hansen (1–0)	Condrey (1–2)		36,459	45–28
74	June 27	Mets	9–4	Lester (3–0)	Soler (2–2)		36,250	46–28
75	June 28	Mets	10–2	Beckett (10–3)	Martínez (7–4)		36,035	47–28
76	June 29	Mets	4–2	Schilling (10–2)	Heilman (0–3)	Papelbon (24)	36,028	48–28
77	June 30	@ Marlins	5–2	Willis (5–7)	Johnson (3–9)	Borowski (15)	32,194	48–29

July (15–12)

#	Date	Opponent	Score	Win	Loss	Save	Attendance	Record
78	July 1	@ Marlins	11–5	Wakefield (6–8)	Moehler (5–7)		38,014	49–29
79	July 2	@ Marlins	4–3	Timlin (4–0)	Messenger (1–4)	Papelbon (25)	22,840	50–29
80	July 3	@ Devil Rays	3–0	Kazmir (10–5)	Beckett (10–4)		26,149	50–30
81	July 4	@ Devil Rays	9–6	Switzer (1–0)	Schilling (10–3)	Camp (4)	21,186	50–31
82	July 5	@ Devil Rays	5–2	Corcoran (3–0)	Johnson (3–10)	Meadows (4)	15,001	50–32
83	July 6	@ Devil Rays	12–5	Wakefield (7–8)	Shields (4–2)		19,330	51–32
84	July 7	@ White Sox	7–2	Lester (4–0)	Buehrle (9–6)		39,355	52–32
85	July 8	@ White Sox	9–6	Beckett (11–4)	Riske (0–2)	Papelbon (26)	39,497	53–32
86	July 9	@ White Sox	6–5	Politte (2–2)	Seánez (2–1)		39,335	53–33
87	July 13	Athletics	5–4	Street (3–3)	Tavárez (1–3)	Saarloos (2)	36,141	53–34
88	July 14	Athletics	15–3	Zito (9–6)	Beckett (11–5)		36,319	53–35
89	July 15	Athletics	7–0	Schilling (11–3)	Haren (6–8)		36,232	54–35
90	July 16	Athletics	8–1	Blanton (9–8)	Snyder (1–1)		35,643	54–36
91	July 17	Royals	5–4	Timlin (5–0)	Peralta (1–2)	Papelbon (27)	36,436	55–36
92	July 18	Royals	1–0	Lester (5–0)	Duckworth (1–3)	Papelbon (28)	36,224	56–36
93	July 19	Royals	1–0	Beckett (12–5)	Redman (6–5)	Papelbon (29)	36,098	57–36
94	July 20	Rangers	6–4	Schilling (12–3)	Corey (1–1)	Timlin (2)	36,489	58–36
95	July 21	@ Mariners	9–4	Snyder (2–1)	Moyer (5–9)		46,325	59–36
96	July 22	@ Mariners	5–2	Hernández (9–8)	Gabbard (0–1)	Putz (19)	46,118	59–37
97	July 23	@ Mariners	9–8	Putz (2–0)	Timlin (5–1)		45,975	59–38
98	July 24	@ Athletics	7–3	Beckett (13–5)	Zito (10–7)		33,370	60–38
99	July 25	@ Athletics	13–5	Schilling (13–3)	Windsor (0–1)		34,077	61–38
100	July 26	@ Athletics	5–1	Haren (7–9)	Snyder (2–2)		35,077	61–39
101	July 28	Angels	8–3	Escobar (7–9)	Lester (5–1)		36,109	61–40
102	July 29	Angels	7–6	Tavárez (2–3)	Carrasco (2–3)		35,621	62–40
103	July 30	Angels	10–4	Lackey (10–6)	Schilling (13–4)		36,048	62–41
104	July 31	Indians	9–8	Snyder (3–2)	Carmona (1–5)		36,387	63–41

August (9–21)

#	Date	Opponent	Score	Win	Loss	Save	Attendance	Record
105	August 1	Indians	6–3	Sabathia (8–7)	Johnson (3–11)		36,328	63–42
106	August 2	Indians	6–5	Papelbon (3–1)	Carmona (1–6)		36,022	64–42
107	August 3	Indians	7–6	Westbrook (8–7)	Beckett (13–6)	Davis (1)	36,557	64–43
108	August 4	@ Devil Rays	3–2	Schilling (14–4)	McClung (3–11)	Papelbon (30)	27,871	65–43
109	August 5	@ Devil Rays	8–5	Fossum (6–4)	Wells (0–2)	Meadows (8)	30,603	65–44
110	August 6	@ Devil Rays	7–6	Camp (4–0)	Tavárez (2–4)		30,093	65–45
111	August 8	@ Royals	6–4	Hudson (5–3)	Lester (5–2)	Burgos (17)	26,687	65–46
112	August 9	@ Royals	5–4	Dohmann (1–1)	Papelbon (3–2)		21,928	65–47
113	August 10	@ Royals	5–4	Sisco (1–2)	Schilling (14–5)	Burgos (18)	21,214	65–48
114	August 11	Orioles	9–2	Wells (1–2)	Loewen (2–4)		36,191	66–48
115	August 12	Orioles	8–7	Papelbon (4–2)	Chen (0–7)		35,768	67–48
116	August 13	Orioles	11–9	Lester (6–2)	Cabrera (5–8)	Papelbon (31)	35,744	68–48
117	August 14	Tigers	7–4	Robertson (11–8)	Beckett (13–7)	Jones (32)	36,392	68–49
118	August 15	Tigers	3–2	Rodney (6–3)	Timlin (5–2)	Jones (33)	36,179	68–50
119	August 16	Tigers	6–4	Wells (2–2)	Verlander (14–6)	Papelbon (32)	36,304	69–50
120	August 18	Yankees	12–4	Wang (14–5)	Johnson (3–12)		36,325	69–51
121	August 18	Yankees	14–11	Myers (1–0)	Timlin (5–3)		36,071	69–52
122	August 19	Yankees	13–5	Johnson (14–9)	Beckett (13–8)		35,738	69–53
123	August 20	Yankees	8–5 (10)	Rivera (5–5)	Hansen (1–1)		36,155	69–54
124	August 21	Yankees	2–1	Lidle (2–2)	Wells (2–3)	Farnsworth (2)	35,829	69–55
125	August 22	@ Angels	4–3	Shields (7–7)	Gabbard (0–2)	Rodríguez (35)	44,041	69–56
126	August 23	@ Angels	5–4	Lester (7–2)	Escobar (9–11)	Papelbon (33)	44,093	70–56
127	August 24	@ Angels	2–1	Beckett (14–8)	Weaver (9–1)	Papelbon (34)	44,109	71–56
128	August 25	@ Mariners	6–0	Woods (4–1)	Schilling (14–6)		40,817	71–57
129	August 26	@ Mariners	4–3	Putz (3–1)	Timlin (5–4)		44,779	71–58
130	August 27	@ Mariners	6–3	Baek (1–0)	Snyder (3–3)	Putz (27)	44,288	71–59
131	August 28	@ Athletics	9–0	Loaiza (8–7)	Gabbard (0–3)		30,159	71–60
132	August 29	@ Athletics	2–1	Saarloos (7–6)	Beckett (14–9)	Duchscherer (6)	30,517	71–61
133	August 30	@ Athletics	7–2	Zito (15–8)	Schilling (14–7)		31,073	71–62
134	August 31	Blue Jays	6–4	Delcarmen (2–0)	Halladay (16–5)	Papelbon (35)	36,238	72–62

September (13–14)

#	Date	Opponent	Score	Win	Loss	Save	Attendance	Record
135	September 1	Blue Jays	2–1	Snyder (4–3)	Lilly (11–12)	Timlin (3)	36,235	73–62
136	September 2	Blue Jays	5–1	Burnett (7–6)	Jarvis (0–1)		35,973	73–63
137	September 3	Blue Jays	6–1	Chacín (7–3)	Beckett (14–10)		35,719	73–64
138	September 4	White Sox	3–2	Timlin (6–4)	McCarthy (3–6)		36,206	74–64
139	September 5	White Sox	1–0	Gabbard (1–3)	Vázquez (11–9)	Timlin (4)	35,912	75–64
140	September 6	White Sox	8–1	Contreras (12–7)	Snyder (4–4)		35,923	75–65
141	September 8	Royals	10–9	Burgos (4–5)	Timlin (6–5)	Nelson (6)	36,531	75–66
142	September 9	Royals	10–4	Nelson (1–1)	Breslow (0–1)		36,402	75–67
143	September 10	Royals	9–3	Tavárez (3–4)	Redman (9–9)		35,703	76–67
144	September 12	@ Orioles	6–5	Hansen (2–1)	Cabrera (7–10)	López (1)	24,551	77–67
145	September 13	@ Orioles	4–0	Bédard (14–9)	Wakefield (7–9)		22,240	77–68
146	September 14	@ Orioles	6–5	Foulke (3–1)	López (9–16)	Timlin (5)	27,741	78–68
–	September 15	@ Yankees	Postponed (rain)					78–68
147	September 16	@ Yankees	5–2	Beckett (15–10)	Wang (17–6)	Timlin (6)	55,091	79–68
148	September 16	@ Yankees	7–5	Proctor (6–4)	Breslow (0–2)	Farnsworth (5)	55,167	79–69
149	September 17	@ Yankees	6–3	Corey (2–1)	Villone (3–3)	Timlin (7)	55,002	80–69
150	September 17	@ Yankees	5–4	López (1–0)	Farnsworth (3–5)	Timlin (8)	55,221	81–69
151	September 19	Twins	7–3	Garza (2–5)	Wakefield (7–10)		36,242	81–70
152	September 20	Twins	8–2	Bonser (6–5)	Hansen (2–2)		36,484	81–71
153	September 21	Twins	6–0	Beckett (16–10)	Santana (18–6)		36,434	82–71
154	September 22	@ Blue Jays	7–1	Tavárez (4–4)	Lilly (14–13)		33,874	83–71
155	September 23	@ Blue Jays	5–3	Burnett (9–8)	Hansack (0–1)	Ryan (35)	42,267	83–72
156	September 24	@ Blue Jays	13–4	Chacín (9–3)	Snyder (4–5)		44,212	83–73
157	September 25	@ Blue Jays	5–0	Marcum (3–4)	Wakefield (7–11)		40,123	83–74
158	September 26	Devil Rays	5–1	Schilling (15–7)	Hammel (0–5)		36,134	84–74
159	September 27	Devil Rays	11–0	Corcoran (5–9)	Beckett (16–11)		36,028	84–75
160	September 29	Orioles	4–3	Tavárez (5–4)	Bédard (15–11)	Timlin (9)	36,269	85–75
161	September 30	Orioles	5–4	Ray (4–4)	Timlin (6–6)		36,596	85–76

October (1–0)

#	Date	Opponent	Score	Win	Loss	Save	Attendance	Record
162	October 1	Orioles	9–0	Hansack (4–4)	Penn (6–6)		35,826	86–76

== Player stats ==
=== Batting ===
Note: G = Games played; AB = At bats; R = Runs; H = Hits; 2B = Doubles; 3B = Triples; HR = Home runs; RBI = Runs batted in; BB = Bases on balls; SO = Strikeouts; Avg. = Batting average; SB = Stolen bases

Bold indicates leader in category.

Player	G	AB	R	H	2B	3B	HR	RBI	BB	SO	Avg.	SB
Mark Loretta	**155**	**635**	75	**181**	33	0	5	59	49	63	.285	4
Mike Lowell	153	573	79	163	**47**	1	20	80	47	61	.284	2
Kevin Youkilis	147	569	100	159	42	**2**	13	72	91	**120**	.279	5
David Ortiz	151	558	**115**	160	29	**2**	**54**	**137**	**119**	117	.287	1
Manny Ramirez	130	449	79	144	27	1	35	102	100	102	**.321**	0
Coco Crisp	105	413	58	109	22	**2**	8	36	31	67	.264	**22**
Álex González	111	388	48	99	24	**2**	9	50	22	67	.255	1
Trot Nixon	114	381	59	102	24	0	8	52	60	56	.268	0
Jason Varitek	103	365	46	87	19	**2**	12	55	46	87	.238	1
Wily Mo Peña	84	276	36	83	15	**2**	11	42	20	90	.301	0
Alex Cora	96	235	31	56	7	**2**	1	18	19	29	.238	6
Doug Mirabelli	59	161	12	31	6	0	6	25	11	54	.193	0
Gabe Kapler	72	130	21	33	7	0	2	12	14	15	.254	1
Dustin Pedroia	31	89	5	17	4	0	2	7	7	7	.191	0
Eric Hinske	31	80	8	23	8	0	1	5	8	30	.288	1
Javy López	18	63	6	12	5	0	0	4	2	16	.190	0
Willie Harris	47	45	17	7	2	0	0	1	4	11	.156	6
J. T. Snow	38	44	5	9	0	0	0	4	8	8	.205	0
Dustan Mohr	21	40	5	7	1	0	2	3	3	20	.175	0
Carlos Peña	18	33	3	9	2	0	1	3	4	10	.273	0
David Murphy	20	22	4	5	1	0	1	2	4	4	.227	0
Adam Stern	10	20	3	3	1	0	0	4	0	4	.150	1
Josh Bard	7	18	2	5	1	0	0	0	3	3	.278	0
Josh Beckett	2	7	2	3	0	0	1	3	0	2	.429	0
Ken Huckaby	8	5	0	1	0	0	0	1	0	0	.200	0
Corky Miller	1	4	0	0	0	0	0	0	0	1	.000	0
Jon Lester	2	4	0	0	0	0	0	0	0	3	.000	0
Tim Wakefield	1	4	0	0	0	0	0	0	0	3	.000	0
Matt Clement	1	3	1	1	0	0	0	0	0	2	.333	0
Curt Schilling	1	2	0	1	0	0	0	0	0	1	.500	0
Abe Alvarez	1	1	0	0	0	0	0	0	0	1	.000	0
Lenny DiNardo	1	1	0	0	0	0	0	0	0	1	.000	0
Jason Johnson	1	1	0	0	0	0	0	0	0	1	.000	0
**Team totals**	**162**	**5619**	**820**	**1510**	**327**	**16**	**192**	**777**	**672**	**1056**	**.269**	**51**

=== Pitching ===
Bold indicates leader in category.

==== Starting pitchers ====
Note: G = Games pitched; IP = Innings pitched; W = Wins; L = Losses; ERA = Earned run average; SO = Strikeouts

Player	G	IP	W	L	ERA	SO
Josh Beckett	33	**204.2**	**16**	**11**	5.01	158
Curt Schilling	31	204.0	15	7	**3.97**	**183**
Tim Wakefield	23	140.0	7	**11**	4.63	90
Jon Lester	15	81.1	7	2	4.76	60
Matt Clement	12	65.1	5	5	6.61	43
David Wells	8	47.0	2	3	4.98	24
Jason Johnson	6	29.1	0	4	7.36	18
David Pauley	3	16.0	0	2	7.88	10
Devern Hansack	2	10.0	1	1	2.70	8

==== Other pitchers ====
Note: G = Games pitched; IP = Innings pitched; W = Wins; L = Losses; ERA = Earned run average; SO = Strikeouts

Player	G	IP	W	L	ERA	SO
Kyle Snyder	16	58.1	4	5	6.02	55
Lenny DiNardo	13	39.0	1	2	7.85	17
Kason Gabbard	7	25.2	1	3	3.51	15
Kevin Jarvis	4	16.2	0	1	4.86	7

==== Relief pitchers ====
Note: G = Games pitched; IP = Innings pitched; W = Wins; L = Losses; SV = Saves; ERA = Earned run average; SO = Strikeouts

Player	G	IP	W	L	SV	ERA	SO
Jonathan Papelbon	59	68.1	6	4	**35**	0.92	75
Mike Timlin	**68**	64.0	6	6	9	4.36	30
Julián Tavárez	58	98.2	5	4	1	4.47	56
Manny Delcarmen	50	53.1	2	0	0	5.06	45
Keith Foulke	44	49.2	3	1	0	4.35	36
Rudy Seánez	41	46.2	2	1	0	4.82	48
Craig Hansen	38	38.0	2	2	0	6.63	30
Javier López	27	16.2	1	0	1	2.70	11
Bryan Corey	16	21.2	1	0	0	4.57	15
Craig Breslow	13	12.0	0	2	0	3.75	12
Jermaine Van Buren	10	13.0	1	0	0	11.77	8
David Riske	8	9.2	0	1	0	3.72	5
Mike Burns	7	7.2	0	0	0	4.70	7
Mike Holtz	3	1.2	0	0	0	16.20	2
Abe Alvarez	1	3.0	0	0	0	12.00	2
**Team Pitching Totals**	**162**	**1441.1**	**86**	**76**	**46**	**4.83**	**1070**

== Awards and honors ==
- Mark Loretta – Hutch Award
- David Ortiz – Silver Slugger Award (DH), AL Player of the Month (July)
- Jonathan Papelbon – AL Rookie of the Month (April)
- Manny Ramirez – Silver Slugger Award (OF)

All-Star Game

- Mark Loretta, starting 2B
- David Ortiz, starting 1B
- Jonathan Papelbon, reserve P
- Manny Ramírez, starting OF (did not attend)

== Farm system ==
The Class A Greenville Drive had previously been nicknamed the Bombers.

Level	Team	League	Manager
AAA	Pawtucket Red Sox	International League	Ron Johnson
AA	Portland Sea Dogs	Eastern League	Todd Claus
A-Advanced	Wilmington Blue Rocks	Carolina League	Chad Epperson
A	Greenville Drive	South Atlantic League	Luis Alicea
A-Short Season	Lowell Spinners	New York–Penn League	Bruce Crabbe
Rookie	GCL Red Sox	Gulf Coast League	Dave Tomlin
Rookie	DSL Red Sox	Dominican Summer League	Nelson Paulino

LEAGUE CHAMPIONS: Portland, GCL Red Sox
