= Baseball Wives =

- Genre: Reality
- Starring: Anna Benson; Brooke Villone; Chantel Kendall; Tanya Grace; Erika Monroe Williams; Jordana Lenz
- Country of origin: United States
- Original language: English
- No. of seasons: 1
- No. of episodes: 8

Production
- Executive producers: Alex Demyanenko; Jeff Olde; Jennifer O'Connell; Jill Holmes; Nick Emmerson; Ross Breitenbach; Tom Huffman
- Running time: 42 minutes
- Production company: Shed Media

Original release
- Network: VH1
- Release: November 30, 2011 – January 29, 2012

Baseball Wives is an American reality television series based around the wives and girlfriends of baseball players from various different teams. The series aired on VH1 and is set in Scottsdale, Arizona, which is primarily home to baseball's spring training of the Cactus League. It was confirmed by Baseball Wives cast member Jordana Lenz that the show had been canceled.

== Cast ==
=== Main ===
- Anna Benson, ex-wife of retired Pittsburgh Pirates pitcher Kris Benson
- Brooke Villone, wife of retired Washington Nationals relief pitcher Ron Villone
- Chantel Kendall, ex-wife of retired Kansas City Royals catcher Jason Kendall
- Tanya Grace, ex-wife of retired Chicago Cubs 1B Mark Grace
- Erika Monroe Williams, wife of retired Arizona Diamondbacks 3B Matt Williams
- Jordana Lenz, Dated Milwaukee Brewers outfielder Nyjer Morgan

=== Recurring ===
- Shayla Farnsworth, wife of Tampa Bay Rays relief pitcher Kyle Farnsworth
- Cheri Knoblauch, ex-wife of retired New York Yankees 2B Chuck Knoblauch
- Maggie McCracken, wife of retired Arizona Diamondbacks outfielder Quinton McCracken

== Episodes ==
No.	Title	Original release date	U.S. viewers
1	"Episode 1"	November 30, 2011	600,000
The fur flies in the explosive series premiere when an offhand remark made by Erika finds its way back to Chantel, who refuses to let the insult lie. Also, Jordana finds it hard to move on from her failed relationship with a player.
2	"Episode 2"	December 7, 2011	224,000
When Anna pushes Chantel to forgive Erika, Chantel bites back by inviting a figure from Anna's past to Scottsdale to settle the score. Also, a trip to a local firing range heats up when Tanya falls for the instructor's big guns.
3	"Episode 3"	December 14, 2011	313,000
Cheri Knoblauch plans to settle her old score with Anna and Jordana tests the waters again with a new guy.
4	"Episode 4"	January 1, 2012	N/A
During speed dating for Chantel, Jordana throws a tantrum when the tables are turned on her and Cheri's reaction puts everyone on edges. Later, Anna's retouching of the girls' pinup calendar ends in fireworks after she insults Cheri yet again.
5	"Episode 5"	January 8, 2012	623,000
When Jordana feels snubbed by Erika and the other ladies, she aligns herself with the only other Baseball Wife she feels will have her—Anna. Also, Cheri and Chantel plan a getaway with plans to leave a certain troublemaker in the group behind.
6	"Episode 6"	January 15, 2012	N/A
Jordana invites Anna to come with them on girls' trip to the Turks and Caicos islands, putting a further strain within the group. In addition, Cheri and Brooke have a major fallout which spills over into their trip, and Brooke takes the feud to a whole new level when she teams up with Anna for another uncouth insult.
7	"Episode 7"	January 22, 2012	N/A
The ladies' trip to Turks and Caicos sours quickly when Brooke is called out over damning online posts about her travel companions, and no one takes it harder than Jordana.
8	"Episode 8"	January 29, 2012	N/A
The ladies discover that Brooke may be out of the group, but not out of nasty things to say about them. An attempt to set her straight once and for all ends with more than mere egos shattered.
