= Anna Benson =

American model

- Born: Anna Adams; February 12, 1976 (age 50); Mableton, Georgia, U.S.
- Spouses: John Warren (1994–1999); Kris Benson (1999–2012)
- Modeling information
- Height: 5 ft 5 in (1.65 m)
- Hair color: Brunette

Anna Benson (née Adams; born February 12, 1976) is an American model, former stripper, and ex-wife of former Major League Baseball pitcher Kris Benson.

== Personal life ==
Anna Benson was born in Mableton, outside of Atlanta, Georgia on February 12, 1976. Benson dropped out of school following her sophomore year of high school and left home when she was sixteen. About that time, she says, "I was a dancer in the Atlanta strip clubs. [...] I had a baby and then a husband when I was seventeen"; they subsequently divorced.

In 1996, Anna Benson (then Anna Warren) was charged with murder when 18-year-old Michael Evans was executed in her Tennessee apartment. Police found Benson's apartment covered in satanic anti-police graffiti, but Benson and her boyfriend had already fled in a stolen vehicle. The national manhunt for the suspects was featured on America's Most Wanted. Witnesses said that Warren told her then boyfriend to "get rid of" Evans. The murder charges were eventually dropped, prompting the victim's father to state that "she got away with murder ... I don't know how she can live with herself knowing that she conspired to kill my son."

In 1998, she met her future husband, Kris Benson, while she was dancing at the Mardi Gras, a strip club in Atlanta; he was playing for the Nashville Sounds in the minor leagues. They had attended rival high schools in Georgia, but had never gotten to know one another prior to this meeting. She and Kris were married in October 1999—her second marriage, his first. As she described it, "when I came to Kris, I had nothing—two pairs of panties and one bra; suddenly, I found I was married to a millionaire". The Bensons were soon labeled "baseball's most incongruous couple," with Anna having "diverted attention" from a star pitcher who "often fades into the periphery." Anna filed for divorce on March 31, 2006, citing an "irretrievably broken" marriage. She later withdrew the petition, and subsequently had another child with Kris. Altogether, they had four children: her daughter Alyssa from a previous marriage, their daughter Haylee, and sons P.J. (from "Paul James") and Devin.

Benson's daughter claims that Benson threatened her with a gun in 2009.

Sometime around July 19, 2012, Kris served Anna with divorce papers. She was arrested on July 8, 2013, after allegedly threatening Kris at his home with a gun and metal baton while wearing a bulletproof vest. She was charged with assault and criminal trespassing. She pleaded guilty to aggravated assault and weapons charges on November 5, 2013, in Marietta, Georgia, and was sentenced to 15 years' probation.

In August 2016, Benson was arrested again after she allegedly trespassed at a home in Mableton and stole mail in April of that year. While in jail, she was scheduled to appear at a probation revocation hearing in Cobb Superior Court in Marietta but did not show up. A representative for the district attorney said the judge signed a consent decree, allowing Benson to apply to mental health court.

== Public life ==
On July 30, 2004, the Pirates traded Kris Benson to the New York Mets. In November 2004, Benson posed for the cover and a spread in FHM magazine and was named "baseball's hottest wife." In an interview with Howard Stern later that year, she vowed that if her husband ever cheated on her she would take revenge by sleeping with the entire Mets organization. Benson later explained the comment as "stupid humor to be understood by these idiots who take everything so literally." In July 2005, she began playing at the 2005 World Series of Poker in Las Vegas. She was ejected for excessive cursing.

The New York Times, having previously noted Anna Benson's "calculated outrageousness," wrote that "in her one year in New York, Anna Benson drove the Mets to distraction." Sports reporter Murray Chass wrote of the Mets–Orioles trade, "Kris Benson doesn't have a good enough arm for the Mets to overlook his wife's mouth. ... And by trading Anna Benson, the Mets may have achieved what Casey Stengel called addition by subtraction." Kris Benson himself later said that he felt New York traded him to Baltimore because of his wife, but Omar Minaya, general manager of the Mets, ultimately discounted speculation that her behavior had played a role, saying, "We just made a baseball trade." Mirroring Chass's linkage of the Bensons, Sports Illustrated opined that Anna Benson's "outlandish antics" had ultimately come to overshadow her husband's "few good years" in the major leagues.

Benson has worked with charitable organizations over the years such as the Pittsburgh Children's Hospital, Salvation Army and American Red Cross. The couple has a non-profit charity called Benson's Battalion that helped area police forces in the cities where her husband played.

== Radio and publication ==
Benson was interviewed on The Howard Stern Show, November 30, 2004, and then again on February 28, 2006. Benson has been featured in several publications, including FHM, Sports Illustrated, The New Yorker and on the cover of The Sporting News. In New York, she was featured in the New York Post Page 6 and Daily News. Benson also appeared on the radio during the Dan Patrick Show.

== Filmography ==
Television Appearances
Year	Television	Notes
2006	The O'Reilly Factor	Guest
2006	The Neil Cavuto Show	Guest
2005	The Fabulous Life of...: Celebrity Wives	Guest
2005	Best Damn Sports Show Period: Episode	Guest
2005	Donny Deutsch Show	Guest
2004	My Coolest Years: My First Time	Guest
2011	Baseball Wives – VH1 (Network)	Herself
2013	Dr. Phil	Guest

== Awards ==
- Ranked #29 on FHM-U.S.'s 100 Sexiest Women 2006
- Ranked #48 on FHM-U.S.'s 100 Sexiest Women 2005
