= Marc Newfield =

American baseball player (born 1972)

- Left fielder
- Born: October 19, 1972 (age 53); Sacramento, California, U.S.
- Batted: Right Threw: Right

MLB debut
- July 6, 1993, for the Seattle Mariners

Last MLB appearance
- September 15, 1998, for the Milwaukee Brewers

MLB statistics
- Batting average: .249
- Home runs: 22
- Runs batted in: 132
- Stats at Baseball Reference

Teams
- Seattle Mariners (1993–1995); San Diego Padres (1995–1996); Milwaukee Brewers (1996–1998)

Marc Alexander Newfield (born October 19, 1972) is an American former professional baseball player from 1993 to 1998 who played for the Seattle Mariners, San Diego Padres, and Milwaukee Brewers of Major League Baseball (MLB).

Newfield played baseball at Marina High School in Huntington Beach, California. As a first baseman, he was one of the top-ranked high school baseball players in 1990. The Mariners drafted Newfield with the sixth overall selection in the first round of the 1990 MLB draft. When he made his MLB debut in 1993, he was the youngest player in the majors. At that time, manager Lou Piniella wanted Newfield to become a full-time outfielder. On July 8, Newfield hit a low line drive to John Valentin of the Boston Red Sox, starting an unassisted triple play.

On July 31, 1995, the Mariners traded Newfield and fellow first round draft pick Ron Villone to the San Diego Padres for Andy Benes, with Greg Keagle later sent to Seattle. The following July 31, San Diego traded Newfield, Villone, and Bryce Florie to the Milwaukee Brewers for Greg Vaughn. Newfield hit over .300 after both midseason trades, batting .309 with one home run in 21 games for San Diego in 1995 and .307 with 7 home runs in 49 games for Milwaukee in 1996.

Newfield was arrested on September 28 in Dearborn, Michigan and charged with possession of marijuana. The next year, he called the arrest "the scariest moment of my life." He injured his hamstring in a 1997 spring training game, which contributed to a slump to start the season. He went on the injured list in May with an injury in his throwing shoulder, which ultimately required season-ending surgery in August. He was the Brewers opening day left fielder in 1998, but his shoulder injury had not fully recovered, limiting him to 93 games in his final MLB season. He played in the minors in 1999 for affiliates of the Oakland Athletics and Red Sox.

After retiring as a player, Newfield worked for a demolition company in Georgia. He has also had several knee surgeries stemming from an on-field collision in the minors in 1999.
