= Greg Keagle =

American baseball player (born 1971)

- Pitcher
- Born: June 28, 1971 (age 54); Corning, New York, U.S.
- Batted: Right Threw: Right

MLB debut
- April 1, 1996, for the Detroit Tigers

Last MLB appearance
- May 26, 1998, for the Detroit Tigers

MLB statistics
- Win–loss record: 6–16
- Earned run average: 6.76
- Strikeouts: 128
- Stats at Baseball Reference

Teams
- Detroit Tigers (1996–1998)

Gregory Charles Keagle (born June 28, 1971) is an American former right-handed pitcher in Major League Baseball (MLB) who played for the Detroit Tigers from 1996 to 1998. He attended Horseheads High School in Horseheads, New York before attending Florida International University and Monroe Community College.

== Career ==
=== The draft and minors ===
Keagle was selected in the sixth round, 170th overall, of the 1993 Major League Baseball draft by the San Diego Padres. He was used almost entirely as a starter in the minors, appearing in only one game in relief before his first call to the majors. His first professional season in the Northwest League with the Spokane Indians was promising (3-3 record, 3.25 ERA), but the first half of his 1994 season was absolutely outstanding. He was 11-1 with a 2.05 ERA in 14 games for the Rancho Cucamonga Quakes and was named to the California League All-Star team. However, that success did not continue after he was promoted to the Double-A Wichita Wranglers, where he was 3-9 with a 6.27 ERA.

He remained in the Padres organization until September 17, 1995, when he was named as the player to be named later in a deal announced July 31 in which the Padres sent Andy Benes to the Seattle Mariners for Ron Villone and Marc Newfield.

In December of that year, the Tigers took him from the Mariners in the Rule 5 Draft.

=== The majors ===
Keagle was on the Tigers' Opening Day roster in 1996, and he made his debut in their first game of the season, April 1. He pitched three innings in his first big league game, surrendering three hits, walking two and striking out two. He allowed one earned run. His first career strikeout victim was Chuck Knoblauch. He then struck out Rich Becker, who followed Knoblauch in the batting order.

Keagle did not have a very successful rookie season. In 26 games (six started), he posted a three and six record with an ERA of 7.39. He also walked 68 batters in 87+ innings of work.

He was used mostly as a starter in the final two seasons of his career, 1997 and 1998. He went three and eight combined in those final two years, posting a career best ERA of 5.59 in 1998. He did not average five innings a start in his final two seasons.

Perhaps the best game of his career came on September 12, 1997, against the Oakland Athletics. He threw seven fine innings of work, giving up only five hits, one run (a home run to Scott Spiezio) walking only one and striking out nine batters.

Overall, his career record was six and 16. He posted an ERA of 6.76, and in 171 2/3 innings of work, he walked 106 batters and struck out 128. He pitched in a total of 46 games in his career, starting exactly half of those. He hit a total of 18 batters in his career, or one every 9.53 innings of work.

He had only one career at bat, facing Denny Neagle of the Atlanta Braves on September 2, 1997, he struck out. He committed zero errors in his career, for a perfect 1.000 fielding percentage. He played his final big league game on May 26, 1998. He wore number 57 during his time in the majors.

=== Back to the minors ===
Although his major league career ended in 1998, his professional career lasted until 2005. He stayed in the Tigers' organization in 1999, split time between the Anaheim Angels organization and the Elmira Pioneers in 2000, where he threw the first no-hitter in Pioneers history (and just one of three in Northeast League history). In 2001 and 2002, Keagle was a pitcher/coach for the Pioneers. He played in the Florida Marlins organization in all of 2003.

He last played in 2005 with the Elmira Pioneers of the Can-Am League.

=== After pro baseball ===
Since retiring from professional baseball, Keagle has coached for the Rochester Institute of Technology (RIT) Tigers. In 2010, he and Rob Grow, another RIT coach, started a youth baseball organization called the Grow2Pro Baseball Group. Keagle has also done color commentary for Rochester Red Wings live television broadcasts in Rochester, New York.

== Personal life ==
Greg Keagle currently resides in Pittsford, New York with his wife Danielle and their three children, Olivia, Jack, and Luke.
