= Jermaine Van Buren =

American baseball player (born 1980)

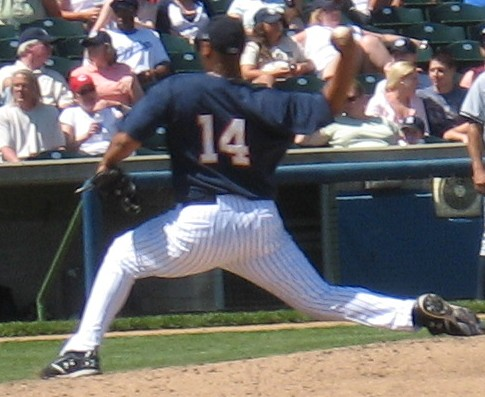
- Relief pitcher
- Born: July 2, 1980 (age 45); Laurel, Mississippi
- Batted: Right Threw: Right

MLB debut
- August 31, 2005, for the Chicago Cubs

Last MLB appearance
- August 19, 2006, for the Boston Red Sox

MLB statistics
- Win–loss record: 1-2
- Earned run average: 9.00
- Strikeouts: 11

CPBL statistics
- Win–loss record: 6–4
- Earned run average: 2.06
- Strikeouts: 97
- Stats at Baseball Reference

Teams
- Chicago Cubs (2005); Boston Red Sox (2006); La New Bears (2008–2009)

Jermaine Russell Van Buren (born July 2, 1980) is a former pitcher in Major League Baseball. He played for the Chicago Cubs in 2005 and the Boston Red Sox in 2006.

== Early career ==
Van Buren graduated from Hattiesburg High School, where he earned Mississippi Player of the Year honors in 1998 as a senior.

He was named to the 1998 ABCA/Rawlings High School All-America Third Team.

He was drafted in the 2nd round of the 1998 Major League Baseball draft by the Colorado Rockies.

== Professional career ==
Van Buren spent four years playing Single-A baseball for the Rockies before being released in 2003 and signing with the Fort Worth Cats of the independent Central Baseball League.

He would get a second shot at the major leagues when the Chicago Cubs signed him as a free agent in 2004. He would quickly go from being a low-ranked prospect to becoming part of the Cubs Triple-A team in Iowa.

In 2005, he finished second in the Pacific Coast League with 25 saves and posted up a 1.98 ERA with 65 strikeouts in 54 2/3 innings pitched before receive a late call-up to the majors. He appeared in six games for the Cubs, ending with a 0-2 record, a 3.00 ERA, nine walks, and six strikeouts in 6.0 innings. At the end of the season, he was dealt by Chicago to the Boston Red Sox in exchange for minor league outfielder Matt Ciaramella.

In 2006, Van Buren was called up when David Wells went on the disabled list and made his Red Sox debut against the Toronto Blue Jays on April 21. He was optioned to Triple-A Pawtucket a day later, and was recalled by Boston on May 24. Van Buren was optioned to Pawtucket June 19, but would return once again on July 28.

He was signed by the Washington Nationals to a minor league deal on November 7, 2006.

On December 3, 2006, he debuted with the Criollos de Caguas (Caguas Creoles) in the Puerto Rico Winter Professional baseball, as a closing pitcher.

On June 26, 2007, the Oakland Athletics acquired Van Buren from the Nationals for a player to be named later. In 2008, he joined CPBL's La New Bears in Taiwan.

== Personal ==
While playing for the Red Sox in 2006 he married the love of his life, Tiffany Suther. In the off-season, he teaches baseball at Amarillo Baseball Academy.
