= Javier López (baseball) =

Puerto Rican baseball player (born 1977)

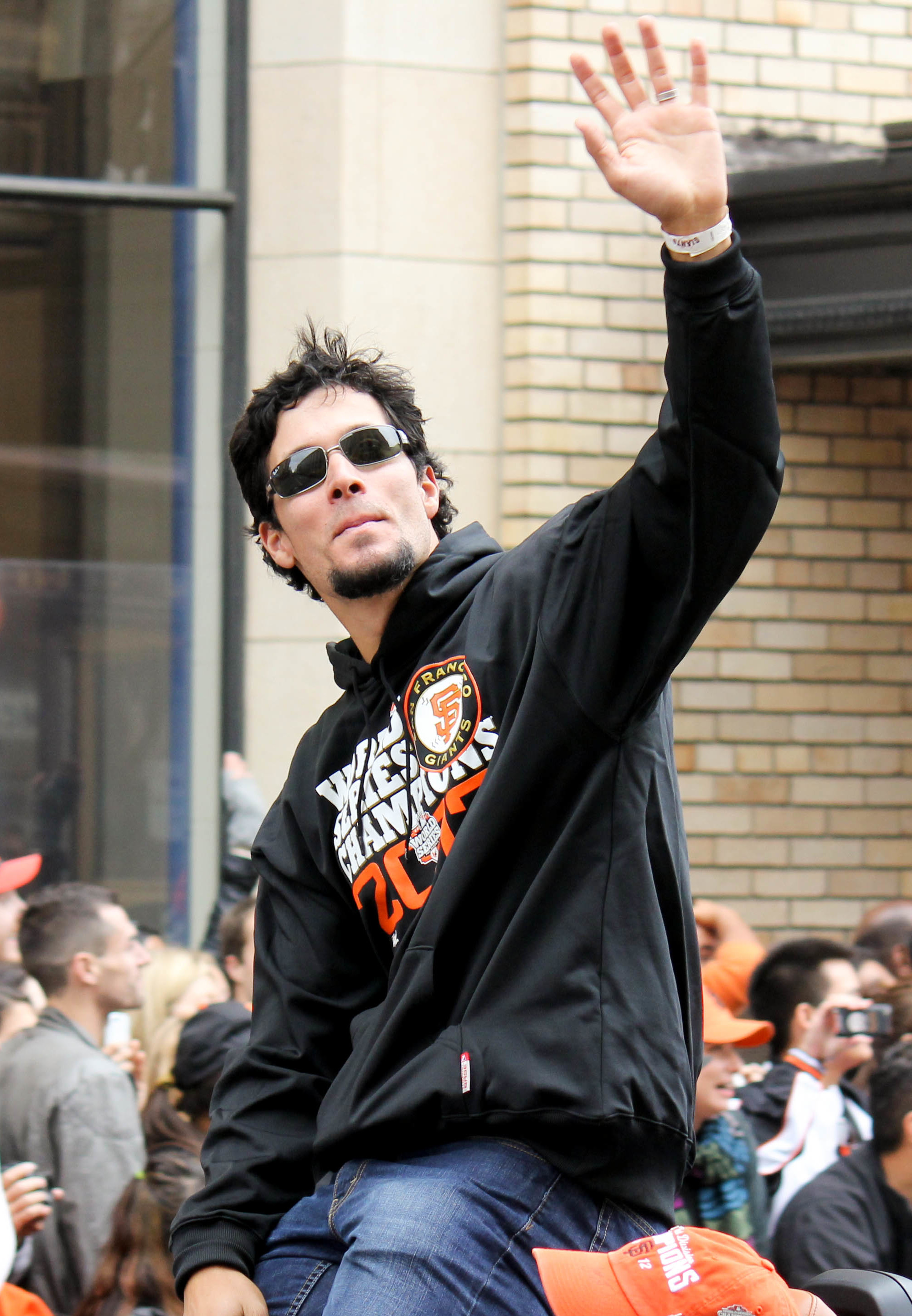
- López at the 2012 World Series victory parade
- Pitcher
- Born: July 11, 1977 (age 49); San Juan, Puerto Rico
- Batted: Left Threw: Left

MLB debut
- April 1, 2003, for the Colorado Rockies

Last MLB appearance
- September 29, 2016, for the San Francisco Giants

MLB statistics
- Win–loss record: 30–17
- Earned run average: 3.48
- Strikeouts: 358
- Stats at Baseball Reference

Teams
- Colorado Rockies (2003–2005); Arizona Diamondbacks (2005); Boston Red Sox (2006–2009); Pittsburgh Pirates (2010); San Francisco Giants (2010–2016)

Career highlights and awards
- 4× World Series champion (2007, 2010, 2012, 2014); San Francisco Giants Wall of Fame

Javier Alfonso López Palmer (born July 11, 1977) is a Puerto Rican former professional baseball pitcher. He pitched in Major League Baseball (MLB) for the Colorado Rockies (2003–05), Arizona Diamondbacks (2005), Boston Red Sox (2006–09), Pittsburgh Pirates (2010), and San Francisco Giants (2010–16). He was a left-handed specialist known for his sidearm delivery. He is currently a member of the Giants broadcast team, working alongside Dave Flemming as color commentator for their away games.

López attended the University of Virginia, earning a degree in psychology despite leaving early to begin his baseball career. In 1997, he played collegiate summer baseball with the Falmouth Commodores of the Cape Cod Baseball League. He was selected by the Arizona Diamondbacks in the fourth round of the 1998 Major League Baseball draft. He began his career as a starting pitcher but struggled, and was converted into a sidearm (or submarine) reliever while still in the Diamondbacks' organization. Before the 2003 season, he was selected by the Boston Red Sox in the Rule 5 draft, but was traded to the Colorado Rockies during spring training. He spent all of 2003 on Colorado's roster, nearly tying the franchise record for most consecutive batters retired and finishing third among major league rookies in games pitched. He struggled the next two seasons, getting claimed off waivers and later sent to the minors by Arizona in 2005. In 2006, he signed with the Chicago White Sox but failed to make the team and spent the first part of the season in the minors before getting traded to Boston during the year.

López served four stints with Boston in 2006. In 2007, he had three different stints but appeared in 61 games, posting a 3.10 earned run average (ERA). He posted a 15.43 ERA in the playoffs but won his first World Series ring as the Red Sox defeated Colorado in four games. In 2008, he spent the entire season on a major league roster for the first time since 2003. He posted a 9.26 ERA in his first 14 games of 2009 before getting sent to the minors for the rest of the season. In 2010, he signed with the Pittsburgh Pirates but was traded to the San Francisco Giants during the season. He had, at that time, his best ERA that year (2.34) and won another World Series as the Giants defeated the Texas Rangers to win their first World Series since 1954. In 2011, López was one of two major league relief pitchers to throw at least 50 innings without giving up a home run. He won his third World Series in 2012 as the Giants defeated the Detroit Tigers in four games. In 2013, López posted a then career-best 1.83 ERA. He won his fourth World Series in 2014 as the Giants defeated the Kansas City Royals in seven games. López announced his retirement on February 8, 2017.

== Early life ==
Javier Alfonso López Palmer was born on July 11, 1977, in San Juan, Puerto Rico. López grew up in Fairfax, Virginia. He and his wife, Renee, attended Robinson Secondary School in Fairfax, Virginia. Growing up, his dream was to be an FBI agent like his father.

== College career ==
López went to college at the University of Virginia (UVA) and played for the Virginia Cavaliers baseball team. Through June 2022, he was one of 38 former UVA players to have made it to the major leagues, along with Mark Reynolds and Ryan Zimmerman among others. While playing at UVA, he went 12–9 with a 6.30 earned run average (ERA). As a hitter, he had a batting average of .319, 15 home runs, and 71 runs batted in (RBI). However, while still at UVA, he discovered that pitching was most likely to get him to the major leagues. Despite leaving college after only three years to play professional baseball, López continued working on his degree in psychology, which he earned in 2002 to fulfill a promise to his father-in-law. He also said, "I had done three years at a great university. I figured I should finish."

== Professional career ==
=== Draft and minor leagues ===
After three seasons at UVA, López was drafted by the Arizona Diamondbacks in the fourth round of the 1998 Major League Baseball (MLB) Draft. He began his minor league career as a starting pitcher for the South Bend Silver Hawks of the A Midwest League. In 16 games (nine starts), he had a 2–4 record, a 6.55 ERA, 31 strikeouts, and 30 walks in 44 innings pitched. He remained at South Bend in 1999, posting a 4–6 record, a 6.00 ERA, and 70 strikeouts over 99 innings pitched in 20 starts. In 2000, López was promoted to the High Desert Mavericks of the A-Advanced California League. In 30 games (21 starts), he had a 4–8 record, a 5.22 ERA, 98 strikeouts, and two saves in 136 1/3 innings.

In 2001, deciding that he would not be able to reach the major leagues as a starter, López converted to a submariner and moved to the bullpen. He said, "I don't know if that was desperation as much as it was admitting failure." He began the season with Arizona's A-Advanced affiliate, which was now the Lancaster JetHawks. In 17 games, he had a 1–3 record, a 2.62 ERA, 18 strikeouts, and one save in 24 innings pitched. He was promoted to the El Paso Diablos of the AA Texas League that season, where he had a 1–0 record, a 7.42 ERA, 21 strikeouts, and 40 innings pitched in 22 games (one start, his last professionally). In 2002, he played in 61 games for El Paso as a reliever, allowing only a .204 opponent batting average. That year, he went 2–2 with a 2.72 ERA, 47 strikeouts, and six saves in 46 1/3 innings.

In December 2002, the Boston Red Sox selected López in the Rule 5 draft, intending for him to compete for a role as a left-handed specialist in the Red Sox' bullpen. However, on March 18 he was traded to the Colorado Rockies for a player to be named later (Ryan Cameron).

=== Colorado Rockies (2003–2005) ===
==== 2003 ====
López made the roster and made his MLB debut for the Rockies on Opening Day in 2003, pitching a scoreless inning in a 10–4 loss to the Houston Astros. He got his first major league strikeout in his next game on April 5, punching out Tony Womack in a 4–3 victory over the Diamondbacks. On April 10, he got his first win, pitching 2/3 scoreless innings in a 7–6 victory over the St. Louis Cardinals. He posted an 0.72 ERA, which led all NL relievers, in his first 30 games through June 8, posting an 18 2/3 innings scoreless streak at the end of that run. However, his ERA jumped up to 3.16 on June 12, when he allowed seven runs in 2/3 of an inning in a 15–3 loss to the Minnesota Twins. From July 31 through August 16, López almost tied a franchise record by retiring 18 straight hitters over the span of 17 days, but he fell short of the record of 21 set by Darren Holmes in 1996 when he intentionally walked Jason Phillips in a 13–4 loss to the New York Mets. On August 12, he recorded his first career save by pitching a scoreless 11th inning in a 6–3 victory over the Montreal Expos. He played in 72 games, the third-most among rookies in the major leagues, trailing only Óscar Villareal (86) and Brad Lidge (78). He had a 4–1 record, a 3.70 ERA, and 1 save.

==== 2004 ====
López started off poorly in 2004, going 0–2 with a 9.93 ERA in 46 games by mid-season. He was then sent down to the AAA Colorado Springs Sky Sox of the Pacific Coast League on July 18. While in AAA, he went 0–1 and had a 4.00 ERA in eight games. He was called back to the majors on August 10 to replace an injured Aaron Cook and played the rest of the season in Colorado. He pitched better the rest of the season, allowing only two runs for a 1.54 ERA in his final 18 games. In 64 games, López had a 1–2 record, a 7.52 ERA, 20 strikeouts, and no saves in 40 2/3 innings.

==== 2005 ====
López began 2005 with the Rockies, but after allowing five runs in his first three games (for a 22.50 ERA), he was optioned to Colorado Springs on April 11.

=== Arizona Diamondbacks (2005) ===
Before he could appear in any games with Colorado Springs, López was claimed off waivers by the Arizona Diamondbacks on April 14. Due to major league rules, Arizona was unable to call him up until April 24. He had another poor season, having a record of 1–1 and an 11.02 ERA, the highest in the majors among relievers who made at least 30 appearances. On July 5, López was designated for assignment to make room on the roster for Armando Almanza. He cleared waivers and was sent down to the Tucson Sidewinders of the Pacific Coast League for the rest of the season. He went 0–1 with a 2.22 ERA. On October 15, he was granted free agency.

=== Chicago White Sox ===
López signed a minor league deal for the Chicago White Sox in 2006. He competed with Boone Logan for the role of left-handed specialist, but Logan won the role, and López was sent to AAA to begin the season. Playing for the Charlotte Knights of the International League, he went 2–1 with 12 saves and an 0.55 ERA in 26 games.

=== Boston Red Sox (2006–2009) ===
==== 2006 ====
On June 15, 2006, López was traded to the Boston Red Sox for David Riske. He posted a 4.32 ERA in 14 appearances before getting sent to the Pawtucket Red Sox of the International League on July 17 because it was too "tough" for the Red Sox to carry a left-handed specialist at that point in the season, according to manager Terry Francona. He was called up for two short stints from July 28 through August 1 and from August 20 through 22, appearing in one game each time. On September 4, he was recalled for the remainder of the season. In 11 September outings, López allowed only one run. He finished the year going 1–0 with a 2.70 ERA in 27 games. With Pawtucket, he had no record and a 4.86 ERA in 13 games (16 2/3 innings).

==== 2007 ====
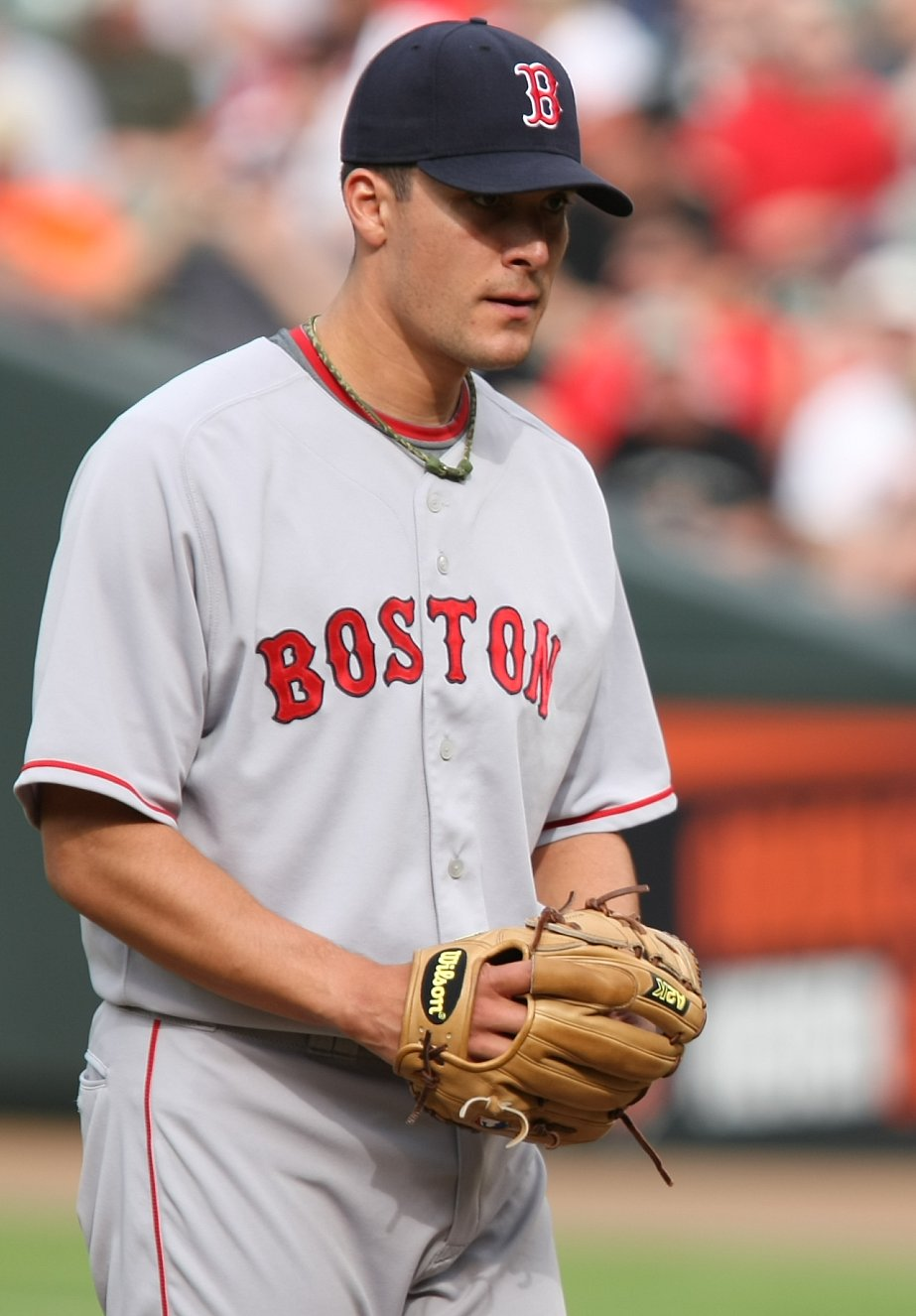
López during his Red Sox tenure

López made the Red Sox' Opening Day roster in 2007, but after four scoreless outings he was optioned to Pawtucket on April 9 to make room for Mike Timlin, who had started the season on the disabled list. He was recalled on May 11 when Devern Hansack was sent down. On this stint, he posted a 3.18 ERA in 40 appearances before getting sent down on August 5 to make room for Curt Schilling, who was returning from the disabled list. With the Red Sox about to face several tough left-handed hitters in late August, Jon Lester was sent down on August 23 to make room for López on the roster.

In 2007, López made 61 appearances, posting a 2–1 record with a 3.10 ERA in 40 2/3 innings. Despite his three stints in the minors, his 61 appearances ranked second on the club to Hideki Okajima's 66. He made 17 appearances for Pawtucket, going 2–1 with a 3.78 ERA. López was a member of the playoff roster for the Red Sox, posting a 15.43 ERA but winning his first World Series as the Red Sox swept the Rockies in four games.

==== 2008 ====
On January 18, 2008, López agreed to a one-year contract with the Red Sox for $840,000, avoiding the arbitration process. In 2008, López spent the full season on a major league roster for the first time since his rookie year. On June 6, he threw a career-high three innings, allowing no runs in an 8–0 loss to the Seattle Mariners. In 70 games, López had a 2–0 record, a 2.43 ERA, and 38 strikeouts in 59 1/3 innings pitched. He had the fifth-lowest ERA among major league left-handed relievers and appeared in the fifth-most games of AL left-handers. He had the second-lowest ERA among Red Sox pitchers in 2008.

López made the playoffs for the second year in a row as the Red Sox won the AL Wild Card. He made one appearance in the AL Division Series (ALDS) against the Los Angeles Angels of Anaheim, taking the loss in Game 3 after giving up a game-winning, twelfth-inning single to Erick Aybar. That was Boston's only loss of the series, as they defeated the Angels in four games. He made two appearances in the AL Championship Series (ALCS) against the Tampa Bay Rays, allowing no runs as the Red Sox were defeated in seven games.

==== 2009 ====
On April 30, 2009, López allowed five runs in 1/3 inning and played the remainder of the eighth inning in right field after Francona switched him with right fielder Jonathan Van Every. This game, a 13–0 loss to the Rays, was the first time a Red Sox pitcher had played another position in a major league game since Tom Burgmeier played left field on August 3, 1980. On May 10, López was designated for assignment to make room for pitcher Daniel Bard after he started the year 0–2 with a 9.26 ERA in 14 games. Shortly thereafter, he was outrighted to the minors. He spent the rest of the season in Pawtucket, going 1–1 with a 3.18 ERA in 38 games. On October 5, he was granted free agency. López ended his Red Sox tenure with a string of 152 straight games without a save, the longest stretch for a Red Sox pitcher since Rhéal Cormier had 160 in 1995 and from 1999 to 2000.

=== Pittsburgh Pirates (2010) ===
On December 18, 2009, López signed a one-year contract with the Pittsburgh Pirates where he replaced John Grabow, who was traded mid-2009, as the Pirates' left-handed specialist. After posting a 10.80 ERA in his first two games, he posted a 2.43 ERA over his next 48 through July 31.

=== San Francisco Giants (2010–2016) ===
==== 2010 ====
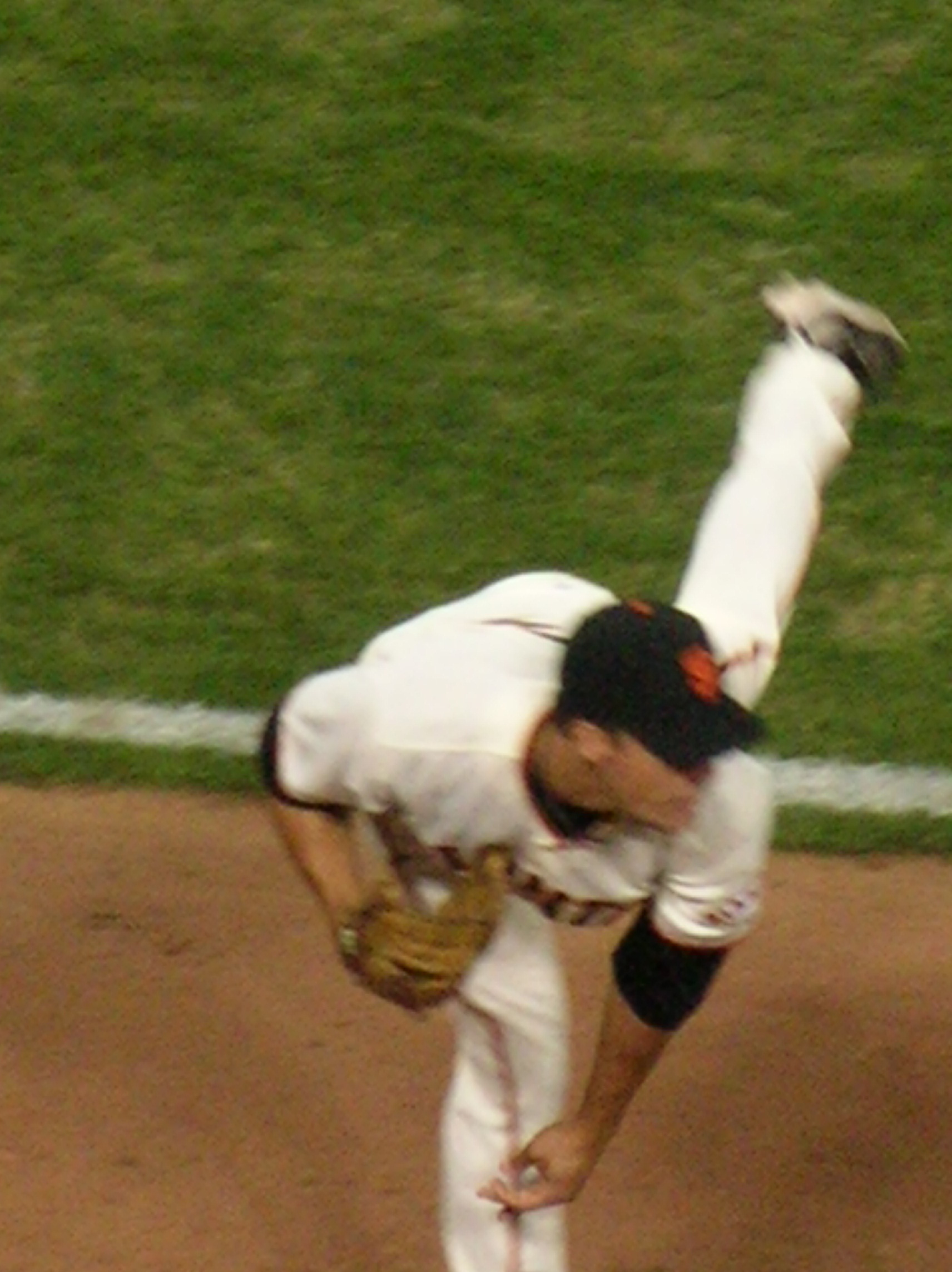
López with the Giants in 2010

On July 31, 2010, López was traded to the San Francisco Giants for Joe Martinez and John Bowker. He appeared in 27 games for the Giants, earning a 2–0 record with an ERA of 1.42. His combined record of 4–2 for the year with both Pittsburgh and San Francisco came in 77 appearances with an ERA of 2.34, both career records. Left-handed batters hit only .162 against López, lowest among all National League left-handers (minimum 85 at-bats). He ended the season five days short of qualifying for free agency.

López reached the playoffs as the Giants won the NL West for the first time since 2003. He made two appearances in the NLDS against the Atlanta Braves to face Jason Heyward, whom he struck out both times. The Giants won the series in four games. Against the Philadelphia Phillies in the NLCS, he made five appearances, all scoreless except for Game 4, in which he allowed a run. In the deciding Game 6, he pitched a scoreless seventh inning and was awarded with a win after Juan Uribe hit a game-winning home run against Ryan Madson in the eighth inning. López made two appearances against the Texas Rangers in the 2010 World Series, striking out the two batters he faced. In Game 2, he struck out Josh Hamilton to end the top of the eighth inning with a runner on second and preserve a 2–0 lead, although the Giants went on to win 9–0. He won his second World Series ring as the Giants defeated the Rangers in five games to win their first World Series since 1954.

==== 2011 ====
After joining the Giants in 2010, López became one of the premier lefty specialists in the game. On May 12, 2011, he recorded his first save since 2006 in a 3–2 victory over the Diamondbacks. Following the game, he crossed his arms, imitating Giants' closer Brian Wilson's post-save gesture. In 70 games in 2011, he had a 5–2 record, a 2.72 ERA, and 40 strikeouts in 50 innings pitched. He and Brad Ziegler were the only relief pitchers in the major leagues to toss at least 50 innings without allowing a home run. His .163 opponent batting average (OBA) against left-handers was the eighth-lowest in the NL.

==== 2012 ====
After the 2011 season, the Giants re-signed López to a two-year, $8.5 million contract. On July 6, 2012, López gave up his first home run since joining the Giants in 2010 when he allowed a 457-foot home run to Pedro Álvarez in a 6–5 victory over the Pirates. That brought his ERA to 4.00, but he posted a 1.00 ERA over his last 32 games. Following struggles by Santiago Casilla (who had replaced an injured Wilson as the Giants' closer), Giants' manager Bruce Bochy announced on August 7 that the Giants would be going to a "bullpen by committee" strategy, with López, Sergio Romo, and Jeremy Affeldt pitching the final two innings of close games, depending on which hitters they would be facing. Romo and López received most of the save opportunities; Affeldt only had one save after that point. López received six save opportunities after August 7 and converted each of them. In 70 games, López had a 3–0 record, a 2.50 ERA, and 28 strikeouts in 36 innings while converting seven out of nine save opportunities. He stranded 87.9% of inherited runners, the third-best mark in the NL. López made five appearances in the NLDS and the NLCS, allowing no runs as the Giants won both of those series. He did not pitch in the World Series but won his third career World Series ring as the Giants swept the Detroit Tigers.

==== 2013 ====
López recorded his only save of the 2013 season on September 19, pitching the final 2/3 of the ninth inning in a 2–1 victory over the Mets. He made 69 appearances in 2013, going 4–2 with a then career-best 1.83 ERA and striking out 37 in 39 1/3 innings. He held left-handed hitters to a .156 OBA. On November 20, 2013, López was re-signed by the Giants to a three-year, $13 million contract.

==== 2014 ====
López appeared in 65 games in 2014, recording a 3.11 ERA with 22 strikeouts and 19 walks. In the 2014 NLDS, NLCS, and World Series, he recorded 11 outs over nine appearances, allowing 4 hits and a walk. Lopez won his fourth World Series ring as the Giants defeated the Kansas City Royals in seven games.

==== 2015 ====
In 2015, López matched his career high with 77 appearances, setting new career-bests with a 1.60 ERA and 0.89 WHIP. He struck out 26 batters in 39 1/3 innings pitched. Of all MLB pitchers, he held left-handed batters to the lowest batting average, .112 (in 20 or more innings).

==== 2016 ====
López appeared in 68 games in 2016, recording a 4.05 ERA with 15 strikeouts and 15 walks in 26 2/3 innings pitched. Along with teammate Brandon Crawford, López won the Willie Mac Award, which honors the Giants' most inspirational player.

== Post-playing career ==
López announced his retirement on February 8, 2017. Soon afterwards, he re-joined the Giants as a special instructor during spring training. In February 2017 it was announced that Lopez, along with Jeremy Affeldt, would be serving as part-time color analysts on Giants telecasts throughout the 2017 season, due to regular analyst Mike Krukow reducing his schedule. On June 2, López joined, for the first time, the other KNBR Giant's radio broadcasters during the after-game 'wrap-up' show.

On December 5, 2025, the Giants hired López to serve as a front office advisor.

== Career overall ==
=== Statistics and achievements ===
Category	W	L	ERA	G	GS	CG	SHO	SV	IP	H	R	ER	HR	BB	IBB	SO	HBP	ERA+	FIP	WHIP	H/9	SO/9	Ref.
Total	30	17	3.48	839	0	0	0	14	533 1/3	484	227	206	26	235	38	358	27	121	3.86	1.348	8.2	6.0	

== Pitching style ==
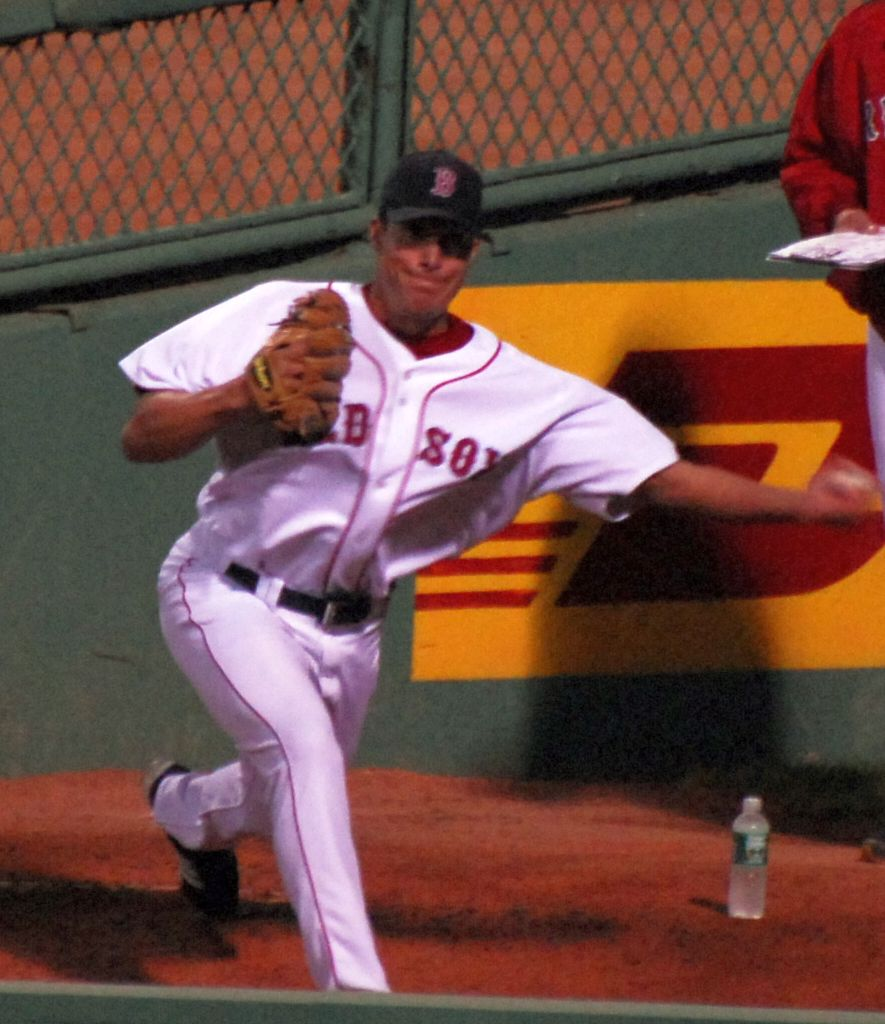
López's sidearm delivery

López's main pitch is a two-seam fastball in the mid 80s, and his secondary pitch is a slider in the high 70s. Against left-handed hitters he will sometimes mix in a curveball. López's distinctive sidearm delivery makes him appealing as a left-handed specialist; through his career, lefties hit only .202 against him, while righties hit .297.

After López struggled to begin his professional career, throwing over the top, he decided he needed to change his style. In the Diamondbacks' system in 2002, with the help of Mike Myers, he began throwing sidearm (or submarine), which Andy Baggarly called "a decision that changed his life."

== Personal life ==
López is married to Renée Richards, with whom he attended high school and college. The couple has two children: Kylan (March 19, 2010) and Christian (October 26, 2012). Because López was in the 2012 World Series when Christian was born, he had to fly back home for the birth between Games 2 and 3. He and his family reside in Georgia. López is a Christian. He says, "I do everything through faith, for sure."

== See also ==
- List of Major League Baseball players from Puerto Rico
- List of Puerto Ricans
