= Ron Villone =

American baseball player (born 1970)

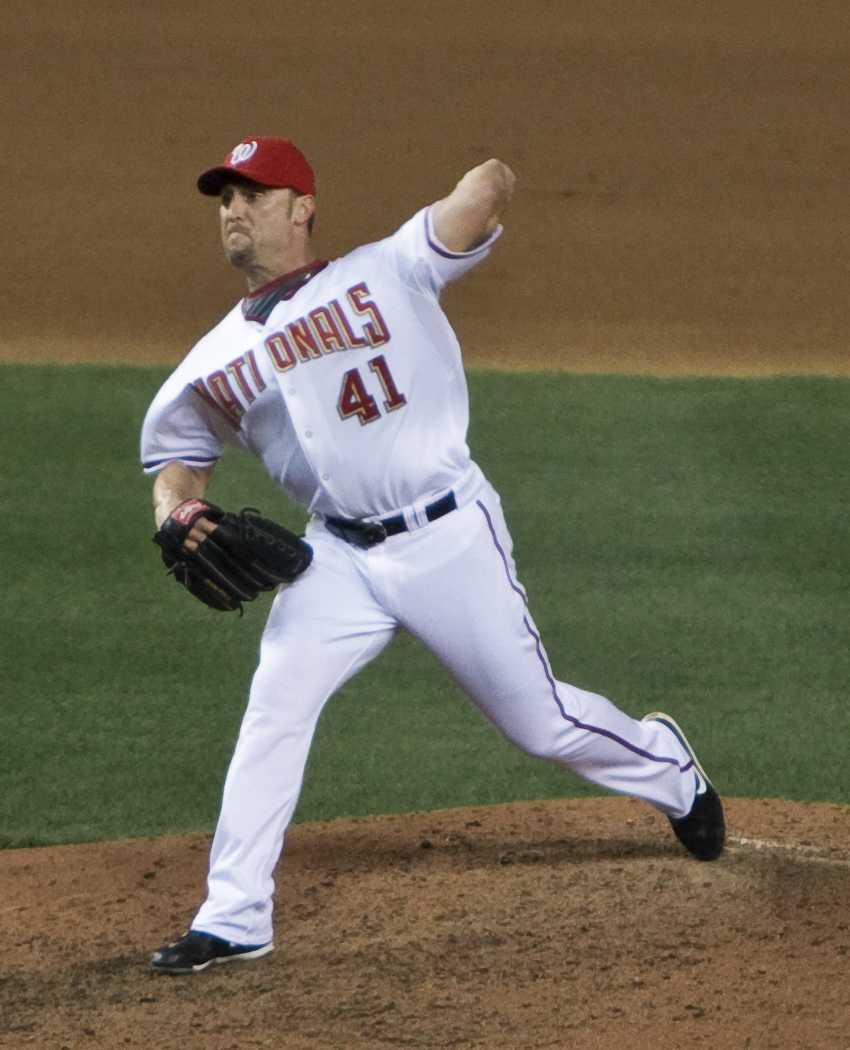
- Villone with the Washington Nationals in 2009
- Pitcher
- Born: January 16, 1970 (age 56); Englewood, New Jersey, U.S.
- Batted: Left Threw: Left

MLB debut
- April 28, 1995, for the Seattle Mariners

Last MLB appearance
- October 4, 2009, for the Washington Nationals

MLB statistics
- Win–loss record: 61–65
- Earned run average: 4.73
- Strikeouts: 925
- Stats at Baseball Reference

Teams
- Seattle Mariners (1995); San Diego Padres (1995–1996); Milwaukee Brewers (1996–1997); Cleveland Indians (1998); Cincinnati Reds (1999–2000); Colorado Rockies (2001); Houston Astros (2001); Pittsburgh Pirates (2002); Houston Astros (2003); Seattle Mariners (2004–2005); Florida Marlins (2005); New York Yankees (2006–2007); St. Louis Cardinals (2008); Washington Nationals (2009)

Ronald Thomas Villone, Jr. (born January 16, 1970) is an American former Major League Baseball (MLB) left-handed relief pitcher and current minor league coach. Villone played for 12 teams in his career, tied for 4th all time with pitchers Mike Morgan and Craig Kimbrel and outfielder Matt Stairs, and trailing only Rich Hill, Octavio Dotel and Edwin Jackson.

== College career ==
Born in Englewood, New Jersey, Villone grew up in Bergenfield, New Jersey. He attended the University of Massachusetts Amherst and was a two-sport star, playing baseball and football. Villone was a tight end when he played football, and he had success with it. In 1990, he was selected as a first team All-Yankee Conference tight end.

In 1991, Villone was the recipient of the Atlantic-10 Left Handed Pitcher of the Year award. In 1992, he was a third-team All American Selection after striking out 89 in just 59 1/3 innings. After the season, he played collegiate summer baseball with the Bourne Braves of the Cape Cod Baseball League, and pitched for Team USA at the Barcelona Olympics. Villone was drafted by the Seattle Mariners in the first round (14th overall) of the 1992 Major League Baseball draft.

== Professional career ==
=== Seattle Mariners ===
In 1993, the Mariners assigned him to the Riverside Pilots, their Advanced-A affiliate. He went 7–4 with a 4.21 ERA in 16 starts. He pitched 83 1/3 innings, allowing 74 hits, walking 62, and striking out 82. He earned a promotion to their AA affiliate, the Jacksonville Suns. At Jacksonville, he went 3–4 with a 4.38 earned run average in 11 starts. In 63 2/3 innings, Villone allowed a total of 49 hits, 41 walks, and 66 strikeouts. Meanwhile, his walks per nine decreased in Jacksonville, as well as his walks and hits allowed per innings pitched. However, his strikeouts per nine innings pitched increased to 9.33, averaging more than one strikeout per inning.

Villone stayed in Jacksonville for the 1994 season, going 6–7 with a 3.86 earned run average. In 41 games, (only five of them were starts); he pitched 79 1/3 innings, allowing just 56 hits, 19 walks, and 43 strikeouts. Although he was not the full-time closer, Villone compiled eight saves in the 1994 season.

Because of his stellar 1994 campaign, Seattle promoted him, effective at the start of the 1995 season, to their AAA affiliate, the Tacoma Rainiers. He had a magnificent start to the 1995 season, going 1–0 with a 0.61 earned run average. In 22 appearances as the full-time closer, Villone saved 13 games and struck out 43 batters.

Villone was recalled from AAA on April 28, 1995. He made his Major League debut on April 28, 1995, working a scoreless ninth inning against the Detroit Tigers. During that inning he stuck out Travis Fryman of the Tigers for his first career strikeouts.

He posted an 0–2 record with a 7.91 earned run average in 19 games for the Mariners. He walked 23 batters, but struck out 26. He was a victim of the long ball, allowing six home runs.

=== San Diego Padres ===
On July 31, 1995, Seattle dealt Villone and Marc Newfield to San Diego in exchange for Greg Keagle and Andy Benes. Villone spent the remainder of the season with the Padres, going 2–1 with a 4.21 earned run average. In 25 2/3 innings, Villone gave up 24 hits, 11 walks while striking out 37.

He started the 1996 season with San Diego’s then AAA Affiliate, the Las Vegas 51s. After having success there, Villone was called up by San Diego. He was just as good with the Padres, going 1–1 in 21 games with a 2.95 earned run average. He pitched 18 1/3 innings, recording 17 hits, 7 walks, and 19 strikeouts.

=== Milwaukee Brewers ===
On July 31, 1996, the Padres shipped Villone, Bryce Florie, and Marc Newfield to the Milwaukee Brewers for Gerald Parent and Greg Vaughn. Villone had success in Milwaukee, pitching 24 2/3 innings (23 games), allowing 14 hits, 18 walks, and 9 earned runs (3.28 earned run average).

Ron Villone stayed in the majors for the entire 1997 campaign. He pitched another season for the Brewers, going 1–0 with a 3.42 earned run average. His workload increased, as he pitched in 50 games (52 2/3 innings), giving up 54 hits, and 36 walks. For the second straight year, Villone averaged less than one strikeout per inning pitched. (In 1997, he fanned 40 in 52 2/3 innings)

=== Cleveland Indians ===
On December 8, 1997, Milwaukee traded Villone to Cleveland in a five-player deal that brought center fielder Marquis Grissom to Milwaukee. This was the third consecutive year that Villone was traded, though this time it occurred in the offseason.

Villone split 1998 with Buffalo (Cleveland’s AAA affiliate) and the major-league club. He had a better time in Buffalo, going 2–2 with a 2.01 earned run average in 23 appearances. In 22 1/3 innings, he gave up 20 hits, walked 11, and struck out 28 batters. In Cleveland, he walked 22 in 27 innings. He also gave up 30 hits, and had an earned run average of 6.00.

Before the 1999 season started, Villone and the Indians agreed to a one-year contract worth $462,500. On April 2, he was released by the Indians.

=== Cincinnati Reds ===
Three days later, the Cincinnati Reds signed him to a minor league deal. During the 1999 season, he went 9-7 with an ERA of 4.23. He pitched in 29 games (22 starts) pitching 142 2/3 innings.

In 2000, he was not as effective, yet he posted a .500 record (10–10). He walked more batters (78), struck out less (77), allowed more hits (154), and had a higher earned run average (5.43) than the 1999 season.

=== Colorado Rockies ===
On November 8, 2000, he was dealt to the Colorado Rockies for Jeff Taglienti and Justin Carter. As a spot starter and long reliever, he went 1–3 with a 6.36 earned run average. In 22 games (6 starts), he pitched 46 2/3 innings, allowing 56 hits and 29 walks, and striking out 48.

=== Houston Astros ===
On June 27, 2001, Villone was dealt to the Houston Astros for Jay Powell. He continued to struggle, going 5–7 with a 5.56 earned run average as a spot starter/long reliever on the Astros’ pitching staff. In 68 innings, he gave up 77 hits, but lowered his walk total to 24. and struck out 65 batters. Villone was granted free agency on November 5, 2001.

=== Pittsburgh Pirates ===
On February 16, 2002, the Pittsburgh Pirates signed him to a one-year contract. He was the team's Opening Day starter. On July 15, Villone broke the sesamoid bone in the big toe of his landing leg while covering first base. Though he continued to pitch through the injury, he later chose to have the bone removed.

With the Pirates, he went 4–6 with a 5.81 earned run average. Over 45 games (seven starts), he pitched 93 innings, allowed 95 hits, 34 walks, and had 55 strikeouts. Villone was granted free agency on October 29, 2002.

=== Arizona Diamondbacks ===
Five months later, he signed a minor league contract with the Arizona Diamondbacks. They assigned him to Tucson, their AAA affiliate. While at Tucson, Villone posted a 1–1 record with a 3.55 earned run average. However, they assigned him to pitch exclusively out of the bullpen. In 25 1/3 innings, he allowed 20 hits and 12 walks while recording 22 strikeouts. Despite this limited success, he was released on May 15, 2003.

=== Houston Astros (2nd time) ===
On May 19, 2003, he returned to the Astros on a one-year deal. He was assigned to AAA New Orleans. A 3–1 record and a 1.23 earned run average in 5 starts (29 1/3 innings) earned him a trip to the big leagues, where he went 6–6 with a 4.13 earned run average. All 19 outings with the Astros were starts, amassing 106 2/3 innings. He allowed a total of 91 hits and 48 walks, and had 91 strikeouts.

=== Seattle Mariners (2nd time) ===
On November 2, 2003, Villone chose to test the free agent market, once again. The Mariners signed him to a one-year contract. Villone had a decent season with them, going 8–6 with a 4.08 earned run average. Again, Villone was used in a long relief/spot starter role, something that he was accustomed to from his days with Houston, Colorado, and Pittsburgh. In 117 innings, Villone gave up 102 hits and 64 walks, while striking out 86.

His contract expired at the end of the season, and he declared free agency once again. The Mariners inked him to a two-year deal. In the 2005 season, Villone went 2–3 with a 2.45 earned run average. Used primarily as a lefty specialist, he pitched 40 1/3 innings, allowing 33 hits, 23 walks, and 41 strikeouts.

=== Florida Marlins ===
On July 31, 2005, the Mariners sent Villone to the Florida Marlins in exchange for Yorman Bazardo and Mike Flannery. As a Marlin, Villone pitched in 27 games (23 2/3 innings), mostly as a lefty specialist. He gave up 24 hits, 12 walks, and 29 strikeouts. Villone struggled in Florida, posting a 6.85 earned run average with the Marlins.

=== New York Yankees ===
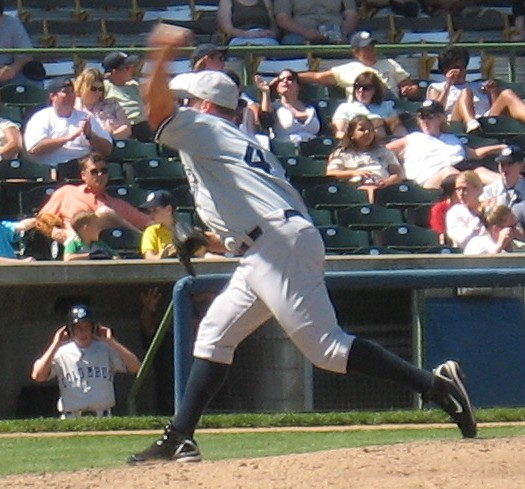
Villone pitching for the Scranton-Wilkes Barre Yankees

In December 2005, the Marlins traded Villone to the New York Yankees for left-hander Ben Julianel. The Yankees also paid the entirety of his $2 million salary. On February 13, 2007 he was signed to a minor league deal with the New York Yankees. During spring training in 2007, Villone was given a chance to earn a spot in the Yankee bullpen, but was beat out for the last spot by Sean Henn. However, he was called back up in mid-May.

During his tenure with the Yankees, Villone was named in the Mitchell Report. He was one of 53 players identified as possible clients of Kirk Radomski. Radomski claimed he sold Villone six kits of human growth hormone between 2004–2005.

=== St. Louis Cardinals ===
In February 2008, Villone was signed by the St. Louis Cardinals to a minor league contract and was invited to spring training. Coming out of camp, Villone made the Opening Day roster.

=== New York Mets ===
On February 27, 2009, Villone signed a minor league contract with the New York Mets and was invited to spring training. He did not make the team, and was granted his release on March 27.

=== Washington Nationals ===
He then signed a minor league deal with the Washington Nationals on April 10 and was assigned to Triple-A Syracuse. On May 7, Villone's contract was purchased from Syracuse. He led the team in appearances in 2009 with 63. On March 15, 2010, the Washington Nationals released him. He was re-signed on April 19. Villone was recovering from a leg injury at the time of his initial release.

During a July 23, 2010, game with the Durham Bulls, Villone took the mound in the eighth inning with a one-run lead but gave up a walk to what would become the tying run. He then threw to first base 12 times to hold the runner, without once throwing to home plate, annoying the crowd who booed Villone mercilessly. When Villone finally threw to home plate, the batter bunted the ball back to Villone, who failed to make the play. Villone walked the next batter and hit the following batter with a two-strike pitch to force in the tying run. He was immediately pulled from the game.

Less than a month later, on August 12, 2010, he was once again released after posting an ERA of 6.59 during his time in Triple A. On March 10, 2011, Villone re-signed with the Nationals.

=== Somerset Patriots ===
Cut from the Nationals before the regular season started, Villone then signed with the Somerset Patriots of the independent AA Atlantic League.

== Coaching career ==
=== Chicago Cubs ===
He became the pitching coach of the Chicago Cubs' Single-A affiliate, the Peoria Chiefs, in 2012. In December 2012, Villone was announced as the pitching coach for the Cubs' new Single-A affiliate, the Kane County Cougars, where he spent the 2013 season. In December 2013, he was promoted to pitching coach for the Daytona Cubs of the Class A-Advanced Florida State League. Villone spent four seasons as the minor-league pitching rehab coordinator before joining the Triple-A Iowa Cubs starting with the 2021 season.

=== Los Angeles Angels ===
In 2024, Villone was named pitching coach for the Tri-City Dust Devils the High-A affiliate of the Los Angeles Angels. In 2026, he was reassigned as the assistant pitching coach for the ACL Angels the rookie-level affiliate of the Los Angeles Angels.

== Personal life ==
Villone is now married to his wife Brooke and resides in Upper Saddle River, New Jersey. They have a daughter, Sofia Francesca (born June 9, 2010). His wife Brooke appears on the VH1 reality show "Baseball Wives", which premiered in 2011.

== See also ==
- List of Major League Baseball players named in the Mitchell Report
