= Devern Hansack =

American baseball player (born 1978)

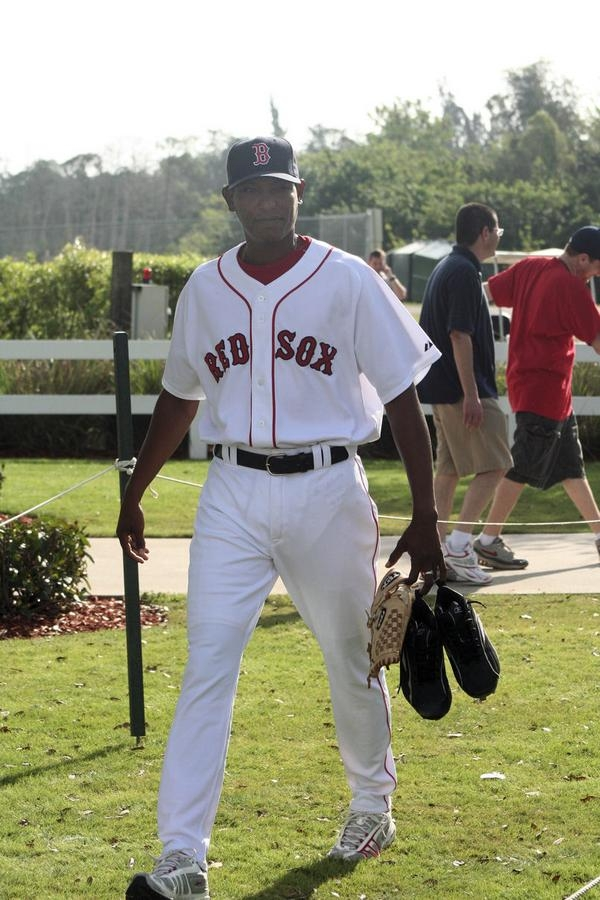
- Pitcher
- Born: February 5, 1978 (age 47); Pearl Lagoon, Nicaragua
- Batted: Right Threw: Right

MLB debut
- September 23, 2006, for the Boston Red Sox

Last MLB appearance
- September 28, 2008, for the Boston Red Sox

MLB statistics
- Win–loss record: 2–2
- Earned run average: 3.70
- Strikeouts: 18
- Stats at Baseball Reference

Teams
- Boston Red Sox (2006–2008)

Devern Brandon Hansack (born February 5, 1978) is a Nicaraguan former professional baseball pitcher. He played in Major League Baseball (MLB) for the Boston Red Sox. He bats and throws right-handed.

== Professional career ==
Hansack, born in Pearl Lagoon, Nicaragua, Hansack is an Afro-Nicaraguan. He originally signed with the Houston Astros as a non-drafted free agent on October 21, 1999. He spent 5 seasons with the organization before being released on March 29, 2004.

From 2004-2005, he played professionally in the Nicaraguan Professional Baseball League.

Hansack came back to Major League Baseball when he signed with the Red Sox on December 9, 2005. He played for the Red Sox Double-A team, the Portland Sea Dogs where he posted an 8–7 record with a 3.26 ERA in 31 games (18 starts). His performance earned him a September call up on September 19, 2006.

Hansack made his Major League debut against the Toronto Blue Jays on September 23, 2006, pitching 5 1/3 innings and allowing three runs while recording two strikeouts to earn the loss.

In his next appearance on October 1, 2006, against the Baltimore Orioles in the last game of the season, Hansack pitched a no-hitter for five innings before the remainder of the game was rained out. Because the game was rain-shortened, Hansack did not get the credit for an official no-hitter; however, he did get credit for both a complete game and a shutout. Hansack faced fifteen batters, walking only Fernando Tatís, who was then retired in a double play.

Hansack pitched well in 2007 spring training, compiling a 2.08 ERA in five appearances. He did not make the major league roster and was optioned to Triple-A Pawtucket for the start of the 2007 season. On May 3, 2007, Hansack was called up to the Red Sox to replace Mike Timlin, who was placed on the DL. He was optioned again to Pawtucket on May 11, 2007, when the Red Sox recalled Javier López. On May 18, he was called up to replace Josh Beckett, who had been placed on the 15-day DL.

On May 19, 2007, Hansack pitched the second game of a doubleheader at Fenway Park with the Atlanta Braves. He pitched four innings, allowing six hits and four runs, he struck out two and walked one. He left after the fourth inning due to a bruised finger. The Red Sox lost the game 14–0.

In 2008, he started the year in Triple-A Pawtucket where he had a 6–10 record with a 4.08 ERA. On August 19, 2008, he was placed on the DL after being hit in the forearm with a ball. He was called up to the majors on September 7.

On April 22, 2009, the Red Sox unconditionally released Hansack. Hansack was re-signed as a minor league free agent by the Red Sox on January 25, 2010. On May 20, the Red Sox released Hansack.

== Career highlights ==
- 2006 Eastern League Champion with the Portland Sea Dogs (AA - Boston)
- 2006 Eastern League Championship MVP
- 2006 Portland Sea Dogs Pitcher of the Year
