= Kris Benson =

American baseball player (born 1974)

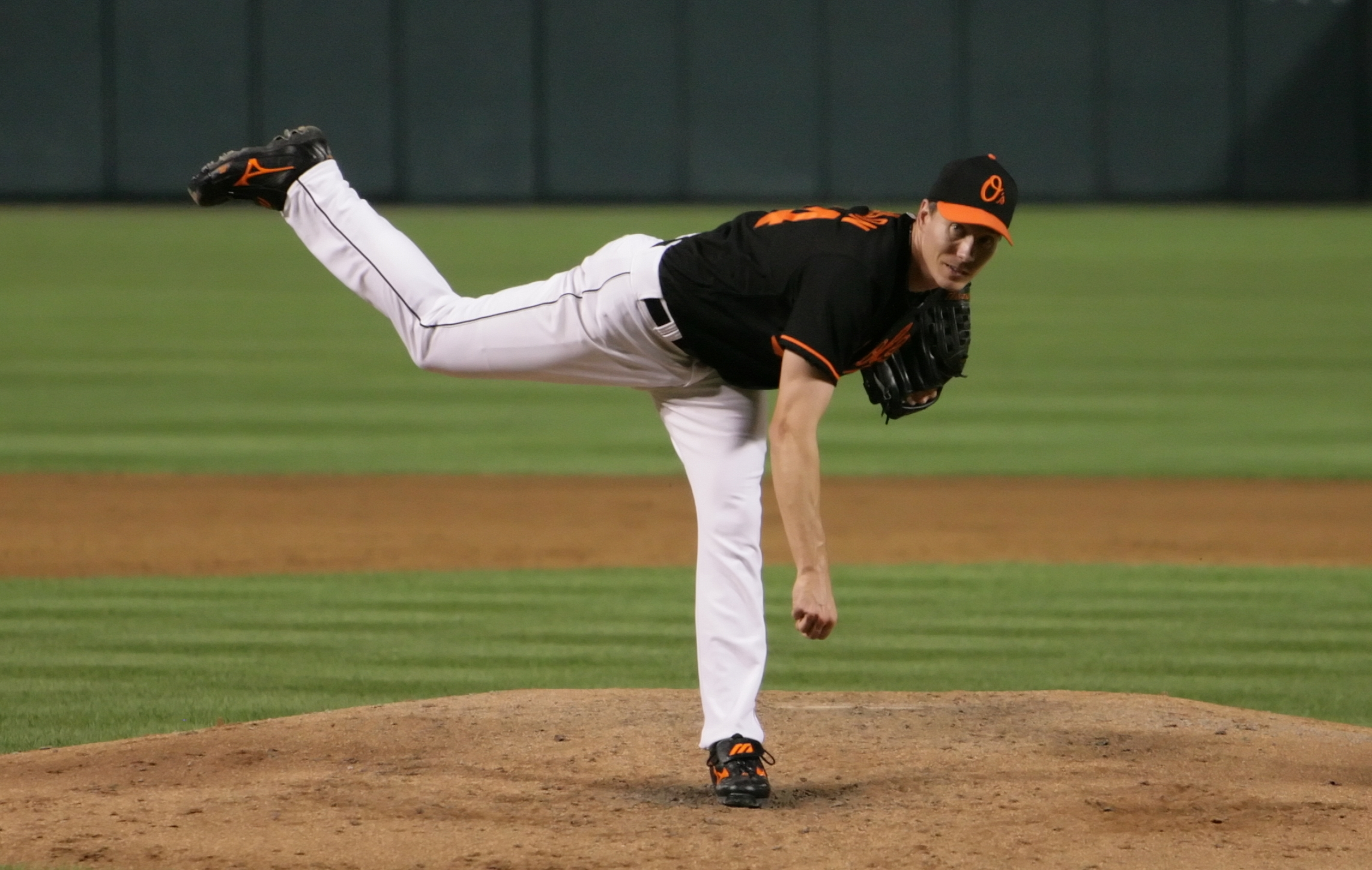
- Benson pitching for the Orioles in 2006
- Pitcher
- Born: November 7, 1974 (age 52); Superior, Wisconsin, U.S.
- Batted: Right Threw: Right

MLB debut
- April 9, 1999, for the Pittsburgh Pirates

Last MLB appearance
- April 28, 2010, for the Arizona Diamondbacks

MLB statistics
- Win–loss record: 70–75
- Earned run average: 4.42
- Strikeouts: 806
- Stats at Baseball Reference

Teams
- Pittsburgh Pirates (1999–2000, 2002–2004); New York Mets (2004–2005); Baltimore Orioles (2006); Texas Rangers (2009); Arizona Diamondbacks (2010)

Career highlights and awards
- Dick Howser Trophy (1996)
Medals
Men's baseball
Representing United States
Olympic Games
Bronze medal – third place	1996 Atlanta	Team

Kristin James Benson (born November 7, 1974) is an American former Major League Baseball starting pitcher who played for several teams between 1999 and 2010.

A highly touted prospect, Benson was drafted first overall by the Pittsburgh Pirates in 1996. He followed a strong rookie season in 1999 with an even stronger season in 2000, but those would prove to be the two best seasons of his career, as he underwent Tommy John surgery after the 2000 season. He posted three more good seasons from 2004 to 2006 with the Pirates, the New York Mets, and the Baltimore Orioles, but then underwent rotator cuff surgery, after which he was never again an effective Major League pitcher.

== High school ==
Benson was born in Superior, Wisconsin. His parents were baseball fans who chose names for each of their children that began with "K," a nod to the letter used as the scorecard designation for a strikeout. Benson attended Sprayberry High School in Marietta, Georgia with future MLB All-Star Marlon Byrd.

== College ==
Benson attended Clemson University from 1993 to 1996. His teammates included fellow future major-leaguers Billy Koch and Matthew LeCroy both of whom played with him in the 1996 Summer Olympics in Atlanta, Georgia, USA. (Koch reported teammates referred to Benson as "The Messiah".) In 1994, he played collegiate summer baseball for the Hyannis Mets of the Cape Cod Baseball League. Benson went undefeated during the regular season of his junior year (14–0 with a 1.40 ERA) with 178 strikeouts in 142 innings pitched.

Following this strong regular season, Benson led the Tigers to the NCAA postseason. Though he pitched only one game in the Atlantic regional playoffs, the Tigers' ace earned all-tournament recognition with an outing in which he allowed only one hit, struck out eight, and walked but one batter. The victorious Tigers, starring Benson, Koch, outfielder and Regional MVP Jerome Robinson, and all-tournament outfielder Gary Burnham, entered the 1996 College World Series on a three-year streak of number-one regional seeds. The presence of Benson, the expected number one selection in the 1996 MLB amateur draft (held that year on the same week as the CWS) helped draw additional attention to the spring series, transforming it into what one then-Clemson sports information official remembered as the "Media World Series." (Benson was, in fact, drafted by the Pirates during the team's trip to Omaha.) Despite his stellar regular season, Benson subsequently dropped two postseason decisions as the Tigers stumbled to a 2-2 CWS record. Nonetheless, the team's two victories ended an eight-game CWS losing streak for Clemson and included a win over top-ranked Alabama.

Subsequently, Benson was named College Baseball's Player of the Year, only the second (after fellow future major leaguer and Olympian Ben McDonald) to be so honored on the strength of his pitching alone. As a Tiger, he won the Baseball America Player of the Year, and ACC Player of the Year. The pitcher also became only the second baseball player and first Clemson athlete in any sport to be named the ACC Male Athlete of the Year. Other awards for his collegiate career include the Rotary Smith Award and ABCA Player of the Year, and recognition as unanimous consensus first-team All-American. He was also the recipient of the Dick Howser Trophy for his "performance, character, leadership, and courage". He has also been inducted into the Clemson Hall of Fame in 2005 and the South Carolina Amateur Hall of Fame. In 2003, he was named to the ACC's 50-Year Anniversary baseball team. A marketing student, Benson left Clemson prior to receiving his degree.

== Olympics ==
In the 1996 Olympics, Benson had 17 strikeouts in as many innings and a 2–1 record, but with a 5.82 ERA. Benson beat Nicaragua to open up the games and then Japan, but it was his single loss (11–2 to eventual silver medalist Japan) which proved costly. Benson lasted only four innings and surrendered five runs, and the bullpen gave up another six, en route to an 11–2 loss that kept the Americans from advancing to the gold medal game. (Ultimately, the U.S. settled for a bronze medal, though this represented an improvement over the squad's failure to medal in 1992.)

== Professional baseball ==
Benson was the first pick of the 1996 Major League Baseball draft. After being signed for what was a then-record signing bonus, he spent two years in the minor leagues with the Lynchburg Hillcats and Carolina Mudcats in 1997, and the Nashville Sounds in 1998. Benson made his first major league start on April 9, 1999. He became just the second number one overall pick to win his big league debut. His first strikeout was Sammy Sosa. Benson came in fourth place in the NL Rookie of the Year voting. He came up just shy of breaking the record for most strikeouts in team history by a rookie hurler. His best season came in 2000 with Pittsburgh when he posted career-highs in earned run average, strikeouts, innings pitched, and games pitched as well as his only double-digit strikeout games and his career-best three-hit complete game despite the fact that he is a groundball pitcher. That year, Benson broke the record for most strikeouts in Pirates history for a right-handed pitcher. After 2000, he needed Tommy John surgery and missed the entire 2001 season. He started the last game at Three Rivers Stadium and the first game ever at Great American Ball Park. Against the Mets, he broke the record for most sacrifice bunts in a game by a pitcher in MLB history with four.

On July 30, 2004, The Pirates traded him and Jeff Keppinger to The New York Mets for Jose Bautista, Ty Wigginton and Matt Peterson. During that period, Benson put together a string of 70 consecutive innings without surrendering a home run. He was awarded the Mets Best Pitcher during the month of September that year with a 0.76 ERA. He beat Randy Johnson twice in the inter league Subway Series, throwing 12 innings of shutout baseball against the New York Yankees.

On January 21, 2006, Benson was traded to the Baltimore Orioles for pitchers Jorge Julio and John Maine. Some speculated that the pitcher had been ushered out of town partly as an excuse for the Mets to part ways with his wife, outspoken model Anna Benson, who had "perturbed team officials with her risqué wardrobe and provocative comments." Kris Benson also felt that the Mets had traded him because of his wife, a position disputed by Mets management. The newly minted Oriole beat the Mets that season in interleague play. During the game, he hit his first professional home run off All-Star and Cy Young Award-winner Pedro Martínez.

Benson missed the entire 2007 season with a torn rotator cuff. Steve Trachsel replaced Benson in their starting rotation before being traded to the Chicago Cubs for minor league players. On November 1, 2007, the Orioles declined to pick up his $7.5 million option and instead paid a $500,000 buyout.

On February 13, 2008, the Philadelphia Phillies signed Benson to a minor league deal. On June 29, 2008, after two years away from competitive baseball, Benson made his Triple-A debut for the Lehigh Valley IronPigs, throwing 73 pitches. He played 11 games for the IronPigs, but was 1–4 with a 5.52 ERA. However, after two rough initial outings, he went 1–2 with a 3.80 ERA over his remaining 9 starts. He was released on August 30, 2008.

On February 21, 2009, Benson signed a minor league contract with an invitation to spring training with the Texas Rangers. Benson made the Opening Day 25-man roster as one of the Rangers' starting pitchers, but after a short stint on the disabled list, he was relegated to the bullpen in long relief. Benson had made over 200 consecutive starts before the move to the bullpen. After proving ineffective as a sporadic reliever upon his return, he was outrighted to the Rangers' Triple-A affiliate, the Oklahoma City RedHawks, on June 9, 2009.

On March 15, 2010, Benson signed a minor league contract with the Arizona Diamondbacks. On April 15, it was announced that Benson would be the fifth starter for Arizona. He had two effective starts when he first got called up, but injured his shoulder again during his third start against the Colorado Rockies. He also pitched for the Diamondbacks Triple-A affiliate in Reno, Nevada, the Reno Aces.

Before his injury Kris threw regularly in the 93-96 mph range, and, he said, “I think I maxed out at 98. After surgery, I topped out at 90.”

Benson retired on January 10, 2011. He finished his 10-year career with a 70–75 record in 200 starts (206 appearances) and 61 no-decisions.

== Personal life ==
Benson lived in Superior, WI until age 6, before he moved with his family to Milledgeville, GA. In 1988, Benson then moved to Kennesaw, GA. He has two younger sisters and one younger brother.

In 1998, while playing with the Nashville Sounds in the minor leagues, he met his future wife, Anna Benson while she was working as a dancer in a local strip club. The Bensons were married in October 1999 (her second marriage, his first), the same year he reached the major leagues. The pitcher and model became a well-known baseball couple during Benson's time in the major leagues. After Anna reported the couple had sex in the parking lot of Three Rivers Stadium, an experience they wished to replicate at every major league park, concern developed within the Pirates organization the "wild-eyed brunette was getting in the way of her husband's fastball...." Her husband dismissed the Pirates treatment of his wife as "a lot of jealousy and a lot of pettiness...."' Anna filed for divorce on March 31, 2006, citing an "irretrievably broken" marriage., although later withdrew the petition. They had three children together (daughter Haylee, and sons P.J. and Devin James) and were also parenting Anna Benson's daughter from her first marriage (Alyssa Warren). In July 2012, Kris filed for divorce, which was finalized later that year. On July 7, 2013, Anna was arrested for attacking Kris after breaking into his house. She was convicted on charges of aggravated assault and gun possession for the attack and sentenced to 15 years probation and three months of inpatient psychiatric therapy. In May 2022, Kris married Misty Martinez, former wife of his former teammate Hank Blalock.

Benson, who earned over $38 million during his playing career, has supported several charities since beginning his professional career. (In an interview on The Howard Stern Show Anna Benson explained that at least one of her husband's contracts had been structured with charitable contributions so that this income could not be taxed.) In 2001, after 9/11, the couple founded the non-profit organization Benson's Battalion, whose work then-Rep. Melissa Hart praised in a citation to the Congressional Record in 2004. The Battalion raised funds for emergency services in the wake of 9/11. They also made considerable contributions to the Red Cross and United Way for 9/11 relief. In 2005, Benson assisted in a new charity, while with the New York Mets, called Tuesday's Children. The charity helped children who lost a parent during the Twin Tower collapses. In recognition of various community service and charity efforts, Benson has been honored with the Pittsburgh Pirates team Roberto Clemente Award, the Thurman Munson Award, the Joan Payson Award, and the New Jersey Sports Writers Humanitarian of the Year Award.

The son of a school teacher and college dean, Benson had been described as studious and methodical in his approach to pitching, personally reserved, and, in comparison to his ex-wife, strait-laced and stoic.
